= Minantologia =

Compilation album by Mina
- Released: 20 June 1997
- Recorded: 1968–1973
- Genre: Pop
- Length: 95:52
- Language: Italian; English
- Label: EMI; PDU

Mina chronology
Napoli (1996)	Minantologia (1997)	Leggera (1997)

Minantologia is a compilation album by Italian singer Mina, released on 20 June 1997 by EMI and PDU. The album features songs from the compilations Del mio meglio (1971) and Del mio meglio n. 2 (1973).

A remastered version of the album was released in 2001.

== Critical reception ==
Claudio Milano of OndaRock called the album "a good collection", adding that it is not just a sequence of different tracks, but a perfect combination between studio songs, alternative takes and live recordings.

== Track listing ==
CD 1
No.	Title	Writer(s)	Length
1.	"Io vivrò senza te"	Mogol; Lucio Battisti	4:05
2.	"Se stasera sono qui"	Mogol; Luigi Tenco	3:32
3.	"Vedrai, vedrai"	Tenco	4:45
4.	"Yesterday"	John Lennon; Paul McCartney	3:15
5.	"La voce del silenzio"	Mogol; Paolo Limiti; Elio Isola	3:20
6.	"Io e te da soli"	Mogol; Battisti	4:18
7.	"Vorrei che fosse amore"	Antonio Amurri; Bruno Canfora	2:26
8.	"Un'ombra"	Limiti; Claudio Daiano; Roberto Soffici	3:21
9.	"Bugiardo e incosciente"	Limiti; Joan Manuel Serrat	6:16
10.	"Insieme"	Mogol; Battisti	4:06
11.	"Quand'ero piccola"	Franco Migliacci; Bruno Zambrini; Luis Bacalov	2:52
12.	"Non credere"	Mogol; Ascri; Soffici	4:06
Total length:			46:22

CD 2
No.	Title	Writer(s)	Length
1.	"Ballata d'autunno"	Limiti; Serrat	5:40
2.	"Parole parole" (with Alberto Lupo)	Leo Chiosso; Giancarlo Del Re; Gianni Ferrio	3:55
3.	"Uomo"	Luigi Albertelli; Enrico Riccardi	3:55
4.	"Fate piano"	Andrea Lo Vecchio; Shel Shapiro	3:50
5.	"Grande, grande, grande"	Tony Renis; Alberto Testa	3:57
6.	"Eccomi"	Dario Baldan Bembo; Mina; Limiti	3:30
7.	"Someday (You'll Want Me to Want You)"	Jimmie Hodges	6:57
8.	"Vorrei averti nonostante tutto"	Testa; Virca; Danilo Vaona	4:36
9.	"Fiume azzurro"	Albertelli; Riccardi	3:58
10.	"Amor mio"	Mogol; Battisti	4:46
11.	"La mente torna"	Mogol; Battisti	4:26
Total length:			49:30

== Charts ==
1997 chart performance for Minantologia
Chart (1997)	Peak position
European Albums (Music & Media)	72
Italian Albums (FIMI)	8
Italian Albums (Musica e dischi)	10

2008 chart performance for Minantologia
Chart (2008)	Peak position
Italian Albums (FIMI)	96
