= Del mio meglio (compilation series) =

Compilation album series by Mina

- Cover art for 2011 digital box set Del mio meglio Boxset, based on the artwork from the Ascoltami, guardami 2006 box set

Compilation album series by Mina
- Released: 1971–1987
- Recorded: 1968–1983
- Genre: Pop; rock; jazz
- Label: PDU; EMI

Del mio meglio is a series of compilation albums by the Italian singer Mina, released from 1971 to 1987. Each of them is an anthology of Mina's hits and significant songs taken from her official albums. Also, songs not previously released on albums appeared in such collections for the first time. Each compilation was reissued in different years on different media: vinyl, Stereo8 (not all), cassette and compact disc (later also remastered and released digitally). Various box sets were also released.

== Del mio meglio series ==
=== Del mio meglio n. 6 – Live (1981) ===
Del mio meglio n. 6 – Live

Compilation album by Mina
- Released: July 1981
- Recorded: 1968–1978
- Venue: La Bussola, Tuscany
- Genre: Pop; rock; jazz
- Length: 43:24
- Label: PDU

Mina chronology
Kyrie (1980)	Del mio meglio n. 6 – Live (1981)	Salomè (1981)

Del mio meglio n. 6 – Live was released in July 1981 by PDU. The sixth volume of the series consists only of songs taken from live albums, it does not contain unreleased songs. The songs are arranged in chronological order and are taken from recordings made during only three official concerts of the singer included in the albums:

- Mina alla Bussola dal vivo (1968), arranged by Augusto Martelli ("Cry" and "C'è più samba")
- Dalla Bussola (1972), arranged by Gianni Ferrio ("Fiume azzurro" and "Someday (You Want Me to Want You)")
- Live '78 (1978), arranged by Pino Presti ("Sognando" and others).

==== Track listing ====
1. "Cry" (Churchill Kohlman) – 3:30
2. "C'è più samba" (Bruno Lauzi, Chico Buarque de Hollanda) – 3:30
3. "Fiume azzurro" (Luigi Albertelli, Enrico Riccardi) – 3:42
4. "Someday (You Want Me to Want You)" (Jimmie Hodges) – 7:06
5. "Sognando" (Don Backy) – 4:10
6. "Non può morire un'idea" (Ivano Fossati) – 4:32
7. "Georgia on My Mind / Angela / Margherita" (Stuart Gorrell, Hoagy Carmichael / José Feliciano, Janna Merlyn Feliciano / Marco Luberti, Riccardo Cocciante) – 8:21
8. "Lacreme napulitane" (Libero Bovio, Francesco Buongiovanni) – 5:10
9. "We Are the Champions" (Freddie Mercury) – 4:14

=== Del mio meglio numero sette (1983) ===
Del mio meglio numero sette

Compilation album by Mina
- Released: April 1983
- Recorded: 1975–1979
- Studio: La Basilica, Milan
- Genre: Pop
- Length: 45:58
- Label: PDU

Mina chronology
Italiana (1982)	Del mio meglio numero sette (1983)	Mina 25 (1983)

Del mio meglio numero sette was released in April 1983. The compilation is notable for containing the song "Ancora, ancora, ancora", which was previously released only on the 1978 single "Città vuota (It's a Lonely Town)".

==== Track listing ====
1. "Michelle" (John Lennon, Paul McCartney) – 5:30
2. "Anche tu" (Cristiano Minellono, Beppe Cantarelli) – 4:56
3. "Emozioni" (Mogol, Lucio Battisti) – 4:35
4. "Sensazioni" (Massimiliano Pani, Valentino Alfano) – 4:47
5. "Da capo" (Marco Luberti, Riccardo Cocciante) – 3:16
6. "Fiori rosa, fiori di pesco" (Mogol, Lucio Battisti) – 3:04
7. "Ancora, ancora, ancora" (Cristiano Malgioglio, Gian Pietro Felisatti) – 4:19
8. "Don't Take Your Love Away" (Shel Shapiro, Isaac Hayes) – 9:05
9. "Dieci ragazzi" (Mogol, Lucio Battisti) – 2:36
10. "Devo tornare a casa mia" (Luigi Clausetti) – 3:50

=== Del mio meglio numero otto (1985) ===
Del mio meglio numero otto

Compilation album by Mina
- Released: May 1985
- Recorded: 1972–1982
- Studio: La Basilica, Milan
- Genre: Pop
- Length: 46:51
- Label: PDU

Mina chronology
Catene (1984)	Del mio meglio numero otto (1985)	Finalmente ho conosciuto il conte Dracula... (1985)

Del mio meglio numero otto was released in May 1985. It includes songs recorded by Mina from 1972 to 1982 (from the albums Cinquemilaquarantatre, Altro, Attila, Kyrie, Salomè and Italiana).

==== Track listing ====
1. "Se il mio canto sei tu" (Paola Blandi, Beppe Cantarelli) – 4:23
2. "Walk on By" (Hal David, Burt Bacharach) – 8:25
3. "Magica follia" (Andrea Lo Vecchio) – 3:54
4. "Io ti amavo quando (You've Got a Friend)" (Paolo Limiti, Carole King) – 4:19
5. "I giorni dei falò (Long Ago and Far Away)" (Giorgio Calabrese, James Taylor) – 2:20
6. "Voglio stare bene" (Simon Luca) – 3:22
7. "Tu sarai la mia voce (Put the Weight on My Shoulders)" (Vittorio De Scalzi, Gino Vannelli) – 4:55
8. "Buonanotte buonanotte" (Carla Vistarini, Fabio Massimo Cantini) – 5:07
9. "Che novità" (Firmo Rizzini, Rudy Meledandri) – 4:54
10. "Già visto" (Massimiliano Pani, Celso Valli) – 5:12

=== Del mio meglio n. 9 (1987) ===
Del mio meglio n. 9

Compilation album by Mina
- Released: May 1987
- Recorded: 1974–1983
- Genre: Pop
- Length: 45:22
- Label: PDU

Mina chronology
Sì, buana (1986)	Del mio meglio n. 9 (1987)	Rane supreme (1987)

The last compilation in the series, Del mio meglio n. 9, was released in May 1987. Mostly songs from the 80s are presented.

==== Track listing ====
1. "Devi dirmi di sì" (Massimiliano Pani, Valentino Alfano, Piero Cassano) – 4:15
2. "Ma ci pensi" (Nino Romano, Federico Monti Arduini) – 4:15
3. "Sono sola sempre" (Bruno Lauzi, Beppe Cantarelli) – 4:20
4. "Rock and Roll Star" (Andrea Lo Vecchio, Shel Shapiro) – 3:29
5. "Una canzone" (Nico Di Palo, Vittorio De Scalzi, Gianni Belleno, Ricky Belloni) – 4:06
6. "Cowboys" (Ivano Fossati) – 1:50
7. "Perfetto non so" (Andrea Lo Vecchio, Celso Valli) – 3:58
8. "Allora sì" (Franco Califano, Massimo Guantini) – 4:13
9. "Quando l'amore ti tocca" (Renato Di Bitonto, Carmelo Carucci) – 3:15
10. "I Only Have Eyes for You" (Al Dubin, Harry Warren) – 3:13
11. "Tres palabras" (Osvaldo Farrés) – 3:23
12. "Anche un uomo" (Alberto Testa, Mike Bongiorno, Ludovico Peregrini, Anselmo Genovese) – 4:48

== Related box sets ==
- 1985 – a box set containing the first seven volumes. Released by PDU on vinyl.
- 1986 – a box set containing the first eight volumes. Released by PDU on vinyl.
- 1988 – a box set containing all nine volumes. Released by PDU on vinyl.
- 1988 – a box set in the form of a cube with ninie volumes in CD format, the faces of the cube contain images of some original covers, an 18-page booklet is attached. Released by PDU and EMI on vinyl (4793172). In 2001, it was remastered and reissued on CD with a 16-page booklet.
- 1997 – Minantologia – a collection of tracks from the first two volumes (remastered and reissued in 2001). Released by PDU and EMI on CD and cassette.
- 2006 – Ascoltami, guardami – a box set including all 2001 remastered nine volumes, as well as a new, 10th volume containing live recordings. The box also contains the book Disegnata fotografata Mina. Released by EMI on CD.
  - 2011 – Del Mio Meglio Boxset – a digital download box set with the same 113-track content as Ascoltami, guardami, released on 25 February 2011 by Warner Music Italia.
- 2009 – Canzoni intramontabili – an extensive box set, including all nine volumes of Del mio meglio as well as other albums by Mina (35 in total). Released on CD by various labels.

== Critical reception ==
Christian Calabrese in his review for Ciao 2001 noted that despite criticism of the series, Mina continues to sell albums quite successfully. Music critic Claudio Milano from OndaRock magazine noted the albums Del mio meglio and Del mio meglio n. 3 as one of the best in Mina's discography.

== Chart history ==
Chart performance for Del mio meglio series
Title	Year	Chart	Peak position	Weeks on chart	Ref.
Del mio meglio	1971	Italian Albums (Musica e dischi)	1	45	
Del mio meglio n. 2	1973	Italian Albums (Musica e dischi)	4	25	
Del mio meglio n. 3	1975	Italian Albums (Musica e dischi)	4	30	
Minantologia	1997	Italian Albums (Musica e dischi)	10	8	
Minantologia	1997	European Albums (Music & Media)	72	6	
Minantologia	2008	Italian Albums (FIMI)	96	1	
