= Del mio meglio n. 2 =

Compilation album by Mina
- Released: April 1973
- Recorded: 1971–1972
- Studio: La Basilica, Milan; Bussola di Viareggio, Tuscany
- Genre: Pop
- Length: 50:06
- Language: Italian; English
- Label: PDU

Mina chronology
Altro (1972)	Del mio meglio n. 2 (1973)	Frutta e verdura (1973)

Del mio meglio n. 2 is a compilation album by Italian singer Mina, released in 1973 by PDU. The album contains songs previously released on studio albums, with the exception of "Uomo", "Eccomi" and "La mente torna", which were released only as singles.

== Track listing ==
Side A
No.	Title	Writer(s)	Original album	Length
1.	"Ballata d'autunno (Balada de otoño)"	Joan Manuel Serrat; Paolo Limiti	Altro (1972)	5:42
2.	"Parole parole" (with Alberto Lupo)	Leo Chiosso; Giancarlo Del Re; Gianni Ferrio	Cinquemilaquarantatre (1972)	3:54
3.	"Uomo"	Luigi Albertelli; Enrico Riccardi	—	3:58
4.	"Fate piano"	Andrea Lo Vecchio, Shel Shapiro	Altro (1972)	4:02
5.	"Grande, grande, grande"	Tony Renis; Alberto Testa	Mina (1971)	4:01
6.	"Eccomi"	Dario Baldan Bembo; Limiti	—	3:31
Total length:				25:06

Side B
No.	Title	Writer(s)	Original album	Length
1.	"Someday (You Want Me to Want You)" (Live)	Jimmie Hodges	Dalla Bussola (1972)	7:14
2.	"Vorrei averti nonostante tutto"	Testa; Virginio Capitini; Danilo Vaona	Cinquemilaquarantatre (1972)	4:36
3.	"Fiume azzurro"	Albertelli; Riccardi	Cinquemilaquarantatre (1972)	3:57
4.	"Amor mio"	Lucio Battisti; Mogol	Mina (1971)	4:49
5.	"La mente torna"	Battisti; Mogol	—	4:26
Total length:				25:00

== Personnel ==
- Mina – vocals
- Natale Massara – arrangement (A1, A3)
- Gianni Ferrio – arrangement (A2, B1)
- Pino Presti – arrangement (A4, A5, B2, B3)
- Dario Baldan Bembo – arrangement (A6)
- Gian Piero Reverberi – arrangement (B4, B5)
- Nuccio Rinaldis – sound engineering
- Antonio Manzi – sound engineering
- Luciano Tallarini – cover art
- Gianni Ronco – cover art

Credits are adapted from the album's liner notes.

== Charts ==
Chart performance for Del mio meglio n. 2
Chart (1973)	Peak position
Italian Albums (Musica e dischi)	4
