= Studio Collection =

Compilation album by Mina
- Released: 26 November 1998
- Recorded: 1970–1997
- Genre: Pop; rock
- Length: 147:02
- Language: Italian
- Label: PDU; EMI
- Producer: Massimiliano Pani
- Compiler: Paolo Piccioli

Mina chronology
Mina Celentano (1998)	Studio Collection (1998)	Mina Gold 2 (1999)

Studio Collection is a compilation album by Italian singer Mina, released on 26 November 1998 by PDU and EMI.

== Content ==
The compilation album contains, in chronological order, songs recorded between 1970 and 1997. Some of them have not been released on albums before:

- "Ninna nanna" was released in 1984 as the b-side of "Rose su rose", a single from the album Catene (1984).
- "Città vuota (It's a Lonely Town)", in the "disco" version, was released in 1978 as a single (on the b-side it was included "Ancora ancora ancora", a song released later in the compilation Del mio meglio n. 7).
- "Quando mi svegliai" was released in 1975 as the b-side on the single "L'importante è finire", a track included on the album La Mina (1975).
- "Lamento d'amore" was released in 1973 as a single, which also included the track "Rudy". The song was already included on the 1974 rare compilation Evergreens, released only on cassette.
- "Credi" was released in 1970 as the b-side of the single "Io e te da soli" (the latter track was included on Del mio meglio (1971)).
- "Viva lei" was released in 1970 as the B-side of the single "Insieme", a song contained in the album ...quando tu mi spiavi in cima a un batticuore... (1970).

== Track listing ==
CD1
No.	Title	Lyrics	Music	Length
1.	"Con te sarà diverso"	Fabrizio Berlincioni	Mauro Culotta	4:32
2.	"Volami nel cuore"	Alberto Testa	Manrico Mologni; Gualtiero Malgoni	3:39
3.	"Non c'è più audio"	Giovanni Donzelli; Vincenzo Leomporro	Donzelli; Leomporro	4:52
4.	"Amore" (with Riccardo Cocciante)	Maurizio Monti	Riccardo Cocciante	5:20
5.	"Rotola la vita" (with Audio2)	Donzelli; Leomporro	Donzelli; Leomporro	4:48
6.	"L'irriducibile"	Alberto De Martini	Massimiliano Pani	4:20
7.	"Neve"	Donzelli; Leomporro	Donzelli; Leomporro	5:22
8.	"Il corvo"	Marco Luberti	Luberti	3:40
9.	"Amornero"	Duchesca; Lucumone	Aldo Donati	4:20
10.	"Tre volte sì"	Giorgio Calabrese	Pani	5:20
11.	"L'ultimo gesto di un clown"	Paolo Limiti; Moreno Ferrara	Gianfranco Fasano	4:03
12.	"Proprio come sei"	Samuele Cerri	Pani	4:05
13.	"Via di qua" (with Fausto Leali)	Calabrese	Pani	4:51
14.	"Questione di feeling" (with Riccardo Cocciante)	Mogol	Cocciante	4:15
15.	"Comincia tu"	Pani	Pani; Piero Cassano	4:11
16.	"Ninna nanna"	Pani; Valentino Alfano	Pani; Alfano	2:15
17.	"Devi dirmi di sì"	Pani; Alfano	Pani; Cassano	4:14
Total length:				67:42

CD2
No.	Title	Lyrics	Music	Length
1.	"Magica follia"	Andrea Lo Vecchio	Lo Vecchio	3:59
2.	"Una canzone" (New Trolls)	Vittorio De Scalzi; Nico Di Palo	Gianni Belleno; Ricky Belloni	4:13
3.	"Buonanotte, buonanotte"	Carla Vistarini	Fabio Massimo Cantini	5:07
4.	"Anche un uomo"	Mike Bongiorno; Ludovico Peregrini; Alberto Testa	Anselmo Genovese	4:51
5.	"Ancora, ancora, ancora"	Cristiano Malgioglio	Gianpietro Felisatti	4:19
6.	"Città vuota (It's a Lonely Town)"	Giuseppe Cassia	Doc Pomus; Mort Shuman	5:00
7.	"Giorni"	Luigi Albertelli	Shel Shapiro	4:58
8.	"Colpa mia"	Simonluca	Roberto Soffici; Dante Pieretti; Simonluca	4:07
9.	"L'importante è finire"	Malgioglio	Alberto Anelli	3:19
10.	"Quando mi svegliai"	Daniele Pace	Corrado Conti; Mario Panzeri	3:06
11.	"Non gioco più"	Gianni Ferrio	Roberto Lerici; Ferrio	2:53
12.	"E poi..."	Lo Vecchio	Shapiro	4:49
13.	"Lamento d'amore"	Luigi Albertelli; Enrico Riccardi	Albertelli; Riccardi	3:22
14.	"Grande, grande, grande"	Testa	Tony Renis	3:57
15.	"Amor mio"	Mogol	Lucio Battisti	4:45
16.	"Credi"	Limiti	Mario Nobile	3:31
17.	"Viva lei"	Limiti	Vittorio Buffoli; Nobile	3:19
Total length:				66:04

== Charts ==
Chart performance for Studio Collection
Chart (1998–1999)	Peak position
European Albums (Music & Media)	96
Italian Albums (FIMI-Nielsen)	9
Italian Albums (Musica e dischi)	8
