= Evergreens (album) =

Compilation album by Mina
- Released: 1974
- Length: 49:16
- Label: PDU

Mina chronology
Amanti di valore (1973)	Evergreens (1974)	Mina® (1974)

Evergreens is a compilation album by Italian singer Mina, issued in 1974 and distributed only on audio cassette.

All the songs were previously published on other albums, except for "Lamento d'amore", released in 1973 on a 45 rpm.

== Track listing ==
No.	Title	Writer(s)	Length
1.	"Fiume azzurro"	Luigi Albertelli, Enrico Riccardi	3:57
2.	"Vorrei che fosse amore"	Antonio Amurri, Bruno Canfora	2:31
3.	"Se stasera sono qui"	Luigi Tenco, Mogol	3:59
4.	"Insieme"	Lucio Battisti, Mogol	4:07
5.	"Non credere"	Mogol, Ascri (Luigi Clausetti), Roberto Soffici	4:06
6.	"Una mezza dozzina di rose"	Mina, Paolo Limiti, Augusto Martelli	3:57
7.	"Lamento d'amore"	Luigi Albertelli, Enrico Riccardi	3:25
8.	"La canzone di Marinella"	Fabrizio De André, Elvio Monti	3:15
9.	"La mente torna"	Lucio Battisti, Mogol	4:26
10.	"Bésame Mucho"	Consuelo Velázquez	2:40
11.	"Bugiardo e incosciente (La tieta)"	Joan Manuel Serrat, Paolo Limiti	6:16
12.	"Quand'ero piccola"	Franco Migliacci, Bruno Zambrini, Luis Enrique Bacalov	2:53
13.	"E penso a te"	Lucio Battisti, Mogol	3:44
Total length:			49:16
