= Dalla Bussola =

Live album by Mina
- Released: November 1972
- Recorded: 16 September 1972
- Venue: Bussola di Viareggio, Tuscany
- Genre: Pop; jazz
- Length: 31:40
- Language: Italian; English
- Label: PDU

Mina chronology
Cinquemilaquarantatre (1972)	Dalla Bussola (1972)	Altro (1972)

Dalla Bussola is the second live album by Italian singer Mina released in November 1972 by PDU, and was originally distributed as a double album along with the studio recording Altro, entitled Mina 1+1. It is one of Mina's three live albums; like the others, this one was recorded at La Bussola nightclub in Tuscany, on 16 September 1972.

On 3 April 2012 EMI Music Italy released a limited edition of the album included medley of songs "Non credere", "E se domani", "Insieme", "Bugiardo e incosciente", "Parole parole" and "Io e te da soli".

== Track listing ==
Side A
No.	Title	Writer(s)	Length
1.	"The Groove Merchant" (Sigla)	Jerome Richardson	2:20
2.	"Fly Me to the Moon"	Bart Howard	2:47
3.	"E penso a te"	Lucio Battisti; Mogol	3:26
4.	"Fiume azzurro"	Luigi Albertelli; Enrico Riccardi	3:42
5.	"Io vivrò senza te"	Battisti; Mogol	4:57
Total length:			17:12

Side B
No.	Title	Writer(s)	Length
1.	"You've Made Me So Very Happy"	Berry Gordy; Brenda Holloway; Patrice Holloway; Frank Wilson	3:13
2.	"Laia ladaia (Reza)"	Edu Lobo; Ruy Guerra	3:08
3.	"Someday (You Want Me to Want You)"	Jimmie Hodges	6:57
4.	"The Groove Merchant" (Sigla)	Richardson	1:10
Total length:			14:28

40th Anniversary Edition (bonus track)
No.	Title	Writer(s)	Length
7.	"Non credere / E se domani / Insieme / Bugiardo e incosciente / Parole parole / Io e te da soli" (Medley)	Mogol; Roberto Soffici; Luigi Clausetti / Giorgio Calabrese; Carlo Alberto Rossi / Battisti; Mogol / Paolo Limiti; Joan Manuel Serrat / Leo Chiosso; Giancarlo Del Re; Gianni Ferrio / Battisti; Mogol	10:06

== Charts ==
Initial chart performance for 1+1 (Dalla Bussola and Altro)
Chart (1972)	Peak position
Italian Albums (Musica e dischi)	2

2002 chart performance for Mina Alla Bussola Live '72
Chart (1995)	Peak position
Italian Music DVD (FIMI)	2

2012 chart performance for Dalla Bussola
Chart (2012)	Peak position
Italian Albums (FIMI)	11
