= Cinquemilaquarantatre =

Studio album by Mina
- Released: 29 May 1972
- Recorded: May 1972
- Studios: La Basilica, Milan
- Genre: Pop
- Length: 41:26
- Languages: Italian; English
- Label: PDU

Mina chronology
Mina (1971)	Cinquemilaquarantatre (1972)	Dalla Bussola (1972)

Singles from Cinquemilaquarantatre
- 1. "Parole parole" Released: April 1972

Cinquemilaquarantatre is a studio album by Italian singer Mina, released on 29 May 1972 by PDU.

== Overview ==
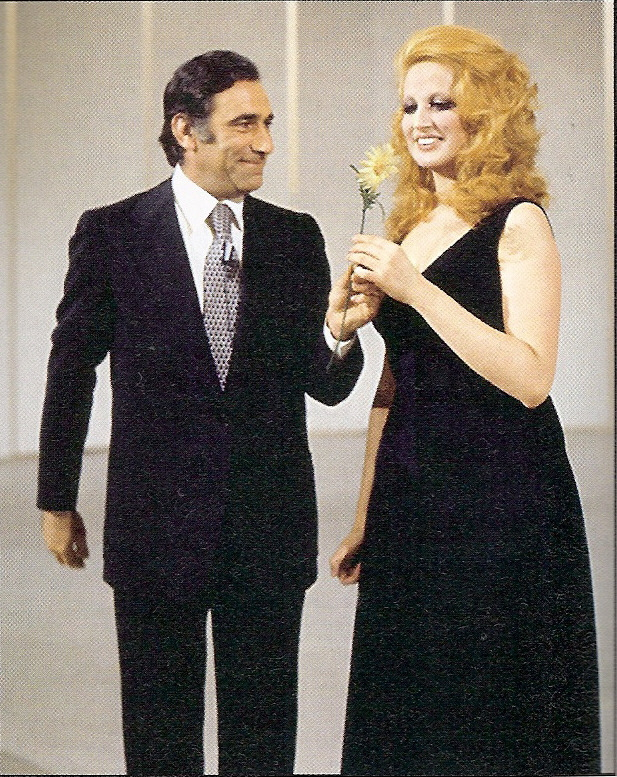
Alberto Lupo and Mina during Teatro 10 performing in 1972

For the first time, Mina performed the new song "Fiume azzurro" from the upcoming album on the TV show Teatro 10 in early 1972, however, it slightly differed in lyrics from the version that was included in the album. The same song was later released as a promotional single. On the same TV show, the singer also performed the song "Parole parole" in a duet with Alberto Lupo, and later her parody version with Adriano Celentano. Another song that Mina performed in Teatro 10 was "Balada para mi muerte" by Astor Piazzolla, but again the album included an altered version of the song in Italian called "Suoneranno le sei".

The album also features the song "Io ti amavo quando", which is an Italian-language cover of the song "You've Got a Friend" by Carol King. The author of the adapted lyrics was Paolo Limiti, and it has a significant discrepancy with the meaning of the original. Another cover was the song "Delta Lady" by Joe Cocker, but Mina recorded it this time in the original language. An Italian version of the Brazilian song "Menina" by Paulinho Nogueira called "E mia" was also included on the album.

Its title (in English, "Five Thousand and Forty Three") is a reference to the catalog number of the disc (PDU PLD 5043).

The album in its original vinyl release came in green, red, blue, purple, and brown versions of the cover made with three separate inserts that, when closed, would form the image of the cover. For the later digital reprint and online distribution, a simple green rendition was chosen. Cassette (PMA 543) and stereo versions (P8A 300843) used further colourings not used for the original vinyl. The Spanish edition (Odean J 064-93.937) has a completely different cover.

Mina's previous self-titled album was at number three on the chart when Cinquemilaquarantatre debuted at number six. In the second week of its stay, the album topped the chart and stayed there for ten consecutive weeks. In total, it spent 30 weeks on the chart.

== Track listing ==
Side A
No.	Title	Writer(s)	Length
1.	"Fiume azzurro"	Luigi Albertelli; Enrico Riccardi	3:57
2.	"Vorrei averti nonostante tutto"	Alberto Testa; Virginio Capitini; Danilo Vaona	4:36
3.	"Io ti amavo quando (You've Got a Friend)"	Carole King; Paolo Limiti	4:20
4.	"È proprio cosi, son io che canto (Hey, Mister That's Me Upon the Juke Box)"	James Taylor; Giorgio Calabrese	3:35
5.	"Suoneranno le sei (Balada para mi muerte)"	Ástor Piazzolla; Calabrese	3:55
Total length:			20:23

Side B
No.	Title	Writer(s)	Length
1.	"Le mani sui fianchi"	Romolo Forlai; Gian Franco Reverberi	2:55
2.	"La mia carrozza"	Mario Nobile; Guido Bolzoni	3:52
3.	"Cosa penso io di te"	Albertelli; Riccardi	4:13
4.	"Delta Lady"	Leon Russell	2:26
5.	"È mia (Menina)"	Paulinho Nogueira; Calabrese	3:47
6.	"Parole parole" (with Alberto Lupo)	Leo Chiosso; Giancarlo Del Re; Gianni Ferrio	3:54
Total length:			21:07

== Personnel ==
- Mina – vocals
- Pino Presti – arrangement, conducting (A1–A4, B1–B5), bass
- Ástor Piazzolla – arrangement, conducting (A5)
- Gianni Ferrio – arrangement, conducting (B6)
- Tullio De Piscopo – drums/percussion
- Victor Bacchetta – piano, Hammond organ
- Andrea Sacchi – acoustic/electric guitar
- Massimo Verardi – acoustic/electric guitar
- Nuccio Rinaldis – sound engineer
- Gianni Ronco – cover art
- Luciano Tallarini – cover art

== Charts ==
=== Weekly charts ===
Weekly chart performance for Cinquemilaquarantatre
Chart (1972)	Peak position
Italian Albums (Discografia Internazionale)	1
Italian Albums (Musica e dischi)	1

=== Monthly charts ===
Monthly chart performance for Cinquemilaquarantatre
Chart (1972)	Peak position
Italian Albums (Musica e dischi)	1
