= Nella bocca della tigre =

Studio album by Mondo Marcio
- Released: 15 April 2014
- Genre: Hip hop
- Length: 44:15
- Language: Italian
- Label: Universal
- Producer: Mondo Marcio

Mondo Marcio chronology
Cose dell'altro mondo (2012)	Nella bocca della tigre (2014)	La freschezza del Marcio (2016)

Singles from Nella bocca della tigre
- 1. "A denti stretti" Released: 25 March 2014; 2. "Un bacio? (Troppo poco)" Released: 13 June 2014; 3. "Solo parole" Released: 31 October 2014

Nella bocca della tigre is the sixth studio album by Italian rapper Mondo Marcio, released on 14 May 2014 by Universal Music. The album is a conceptual one, its feature is the presence in each track of a sample from a song by the singer Mina. The album title, translating to "Into the Tigress's Mouth", references Mina's nickname la Tigre di Cremona ("The Tigress of Cremona").

== Track listing ==
All music is composed by Gian Marco Marcello, except where noted.

No.	Title	Lyrics	Music	Length
1.	"Prologo"	Marcello; Joan Manuel Serrat		0:58
2.	"Il richiamo"	Marcello; Serrat		2:44
3.	"Meno fragile"	Marcello; Massimiliano Pani; Alberto De Martini		3:52
4.	"Fiore nero"	Marcello; Pani; Samuele Cerri		3:19
5.	"Un bacio? (Troppo poco)"	Marcello; Antonio Amurri; Bruno Canfora		4:00
6.	"Solo parole"	Marcello; Gianni Ferrio; Leo Chiosso; Giancarlo Del Re		3:09
7.	"A denti stretti"	Marcello; Alberto Salerno; Gian Pietro Felisatti		3:55
8.	"La fiera della vanità"	Marcello; Anselmo Genovese		3:49
9.	"Dove sarai tu"	Marcello; Franco Franchi; Gian Franco Reverberi		6:38
10.	"Nella bocca della tigre"	Marcello; Pani; Cerri	Marcello; Alessandro De Pieri; Claudio Pelusio	3:28
11.	"Eli-Mina-Zione"	Marcello; Manuel Agnelli		4:19
12.	"Se adesso te ne vai"	Marcello; Mogol; Alberto Testa; Nino Ferrer		4:04
Total length:				44:15

Notes

- The track "Prologo" samples the song "Bugiardo e incosciente".
- The track "Il richiamo" samples the song "Bugiardo e incosciente".
- The track "Meno fragile" samples the song "Fosse vero".
- The track "Fiore nero" samples the song "Serpenti".
- The track "Un bacio? (Troppo poco)" samples the song "Un bacio è troppo poco".
- The track "Solo parole" samples the song "Parole parole".
- The track "A denti stretti" samples the song "Più di così".
- The track "La fiera della vanità" samples the song "Senza umanità".
- The track "Dove sarai tu" samples the song "La notte".
- The track "Nella bocca della tigre" samples the song "Serpenti".
- The track "Eli-Mina-Zione" samples the song "Tre volte dentro me".
- The track "Se adesso te ne vai" samples the song "Un anno d'amore".

== Charts ==
Chart performance for Nella bocca della tigre
Chart (2014)	Peak position
Italian Albums (FIMI)	4
