= Una donna, una storia =

Single by Mina

from the album ...quando tu mi spiavi in cima a un batticuore...
- Language: Italian
- B-side: "Dominga"
- Released: 9 February 1971
- Recorded: 1970
- Studio: La Basilica, Milan
- Genre: Pop
- Length: 5:08
- Label: PDU
- Composer: Gianni Ferrio
- Lyricist: Antonio Amurri

Mina singles chronology
"Io e te da soli" (1970)	"Una donna, una storia" (1971)	"Amor mio" (1971)

"Una donna, una storia" (English: "One woman, one story") is a song by Italian singer Mina, recorded for her 1970 studio album ...quando tu mi spiavi in cima a un batticuore.... It was written by Gianni Ferrio and Antonio Amurri. Released in February 1971 as the second single from the album, the song reached number nine on the Italian chart, staying there for 12 weeks. "Dominga", which is an Italian cover version of the Portuguese song "Domingas" by Jorge Ben Jor, was used as the B-side of the single.

== Track listing ==
7" single
A1. "Una donna una storia" – 5:08
B1. "Dominga (Domingas)" (Paolo Limiti, Jorge Ben Jor) – 3:00

== Personnel ==
- Mina – vocals
- Gianni Ferrio – arrangement, conducting (A1)
- Augusto Martelli – arrangement, conducting (B1)
- Nuccio Rinaldis – sound engineer

== Charts ==
Chart performance for "Una donna, una storia"
Chart (1971)	Peak position
Italy (Discografia internazionale)	22
Italy (Musica e dischi)	9
