= Mina (1971 album) =

Studio album by Mina
- Released: November 1971
- Recorded: Autumn 1971
- Studio: La Basilica, Milan
- Genre: Pop; blue-eyed soul
- Length: 44:50
- Language: Italian; English
- Label: PDU

Mina chronology
Del mio meglio (1971)	Mina (1971)	Cinquemilaquarantatre (1972)

Singles from Mina
- 1. "Amor mio" Released: May 1971; 2. "Grande, grande, grande" Released: January 1972

Mina is a studio album by Italian singer Mina, released in 1971 by her own label, PDU.

== Overview ==
This album symbolically marked the transition period between Augusto Martelli and Pino Presti as arranger and conductor and is distinguished by the classical character and elegance of the pieces, capable of creating a particularly homogeneous and refined atmosphere.

This is the first album that doesn't feature the singer on the cover. In her place, a close-up of a monkey appears; among fans, it is even known as "L'album della scimmia" ("The monkey's album"). This original and eccentric decision is due to the lack of recent photographic material for the cover, given the singer's motherhood, who was due to give birth to her second daughter in November. It is also the second album under the title Mina, after the one released in 1964.

== Musical content ==
The album contains both cover versions and songs written especially for the singer. The album opens with "E penso a te," which is a reworking of a track originally recorded last year by Bruno Lauzi as the b-side of "Mary oh Mary." Next up is an Italian-language cover of "I'll Be Home" by Randy Newman called "Capirò". "Le farfalle nella notte" with lyrics by Luciano Beretta was first heard in Alberto Lattuada's 1970 film Come Have Coffee with Us. "Sentimentale" is a collaboration with Lucio Dalla, an aspiring singer-songwriter who performed at the Sanremo Festival the same year. "Alfie" is Mina's version of a song written by Burt Bacharach and Hal David five years earlier for the Lewis Gilbert film of the same name, originally performed by Cilla Black and later by Cher. Mina also recorded a cover version of the Beatles' "Something" for the album.

The main hits on the album were the songs "Amor mio" and "Grande grande grande". The song "Amor mio" was written by the duo Lucio Battisti and Mogol specifically for Mina. It was released as a single and achieved impressive success in the Italian chart, reaching second place. It is also considered one of Mina's signature song. The song "Grande, grande, grande", written by Alberto Testa and Tony Renis, was initially offered to Ornella Vanoni, Milva, Rosanna Fratello and Orietta Berti, but they all rejected it. Mina recorded it for the album and released it as the second single; the song become the leader of the Italian chart, as well as the second best-selling song of 1972. Both of them are also the most successful singles in Mina's career.

== Commercial performance ==
The album was a great commercial success in Italy. Debuting at number eighteen on the chart, it reached number two two weeks later, where it stayed for ten weeks before finally climbing to number one; it remained at number one for ten weeks in a row, and then for another nine weeks at number two. The album spent a total of forty weeks on the chart, one of the best performances for the singer. In total, the album sold 900,000 copies.

== Critical reception ==
Ezio Guaitamacchi called the album an excellent recording with tasteful original songs, consolidating Mina's breakthrough made in 1967. Mattia Marzi from Rockol also stated that this is a very elegant, well-arranged record filled with songs that pay tribute to Mazzini's talent and timeless vocals.

== Track listing ==
Side A
No.	Title	Writer(s)	Length
1.	"E penso a te"	Lucio Battisti; Mogol	3:40
2.	"Capirò (I'll Be Home)"	Randy Newman; Franca Evangelisti	2:55
3.	"Le farfalle nella notte"	Luciano Beretta; Rossella Conz; Pino Massara	4:09
4.	"Non ho parlato mai"	Paolo Limiti; Mario Robbiani	3:23
5.	"Sentimentale"	Lucio Dalla; Sergio Bardotti; Gianfranco Baldazzi	4:38
6.	"Alfie"	Burt Bacharach; Hal David	3:40
Total length:			22:25

Side B
No.	Title	Writer(s)	Length
1.	"Grande, grande, grande"	Tony Renis; Alberto Testa	3:57
2.	"Amor mio"	Lucio Battisti; Mogol	4:46
3.	"Al cuore non comandi mai (Plus fort que nous)"	Francis Lai; Herbert Pagani	3:53
4.	"Something"	George Harrison	3:05
5.	"Vacanze"	Umberto Bindi; Carlo Alberto Rossi	3:14
6.	"Mi fai sentire cosi strana"	Bruno Lauzi; Riccardo Del Turco	3:30
Total length:			22:25

== Personnel ==
- Mina – vocals
- Pino Presti – arrangement, conducting (A1, B1)
- Gian Piero Reverberi – arrangement, conducting (A2, B2, B6)
- Augusto Martelli – arrangement, conducting (A3, A5)
- Mario Robbiani – arrangement, conducting (A4, A6, B3–B5)
- Nuccio Rinaldis – sound engineer
- Abramo Pesatori – sound engineer
- Luciano Tallarini – cover art

Credits are adapted from the album's liner notes.

== Charts ==
=== Weekly charts ===
Weekly chart performance for Mina
Chart (1972)	Peak position
Italian Albums (Discografia internazionale)	1
Italian Albums (Musica e dischi)	1

=== Monthly charts ===
Monthly chart performance for Mina
Chart (1972)	Peak position
Italian Albums (Musica e dischi)	1
