= Uomo =

Single by Mina
- Language: Italian
- B-side: "La mente torna"
- Released: November 1971
- Recorded: 27 October 1971
- Studio: La Basilica, Milan
- Genre: Pop
- Length: 3:55
- Label: PDU
- Composer: Enrico Riccardi
- Lyricist: Luigi Albertelli

Mina singles chronology
"Amor mio" (1971)	"Uomo" (1971)	"Grande, grande, grande" (1972)

"Uomo" (English: Man) is a song by Italian singer Mina. It was written by Enrico Riccardi with lyrics by Luigi Albertelli.

The song was released as a single in November 1971, rising to number three on the chart. The B-side was the song "La mente torna", written by Mogol and Lucio Battisti. However, the songs were not included in any studio album, but were featured on the compilation Del mio meglio n. 2 in 1973.

There are also Spanish-translated and sung versions of both songs by Mina, originally included in the album intended only for the Latin market Amor mio (Mina canta en Español): "Yo qué puedo hacer" ("Uomo", adapted lyrics by Julio Cesar) and "La mente cambia" ("La mente torna", lyrics by A. Belgrano).

Both songs were performed by Mina during the spring season of the 1972 TV program Teatro 10.

== Track listing ==
7" single
A. "Uomo" – 3:55
B. "La mente torna" (Mogol; Lucio Battisti) – 4:26

== Personnel ==
- Mina – vocals
- Natale Massara – arrangement (A1)
- Gian Piero Reverberi – arrangement (B1)

== Charts ==
Chart performance for "Uomo"
Chart (1971)	Peak position
Italy (Discografia internazionale)	11
Italy (Musica e dischi)	3

Chart performance for "La mente torna"
Chart (1971)	Peak position
Italy (Musica e dischi)	16
