= Lamento d'amore =

Single by Mina
- Language: Italian
- B-side: "Rudy"
- Released: 9 April 1973
- Genre: Pop
- Length: 3:22
- Label: PDU
- Composer: Enrico Riccardi
- Lyricist: Luigi Albertelli

Mina singles chronology
| "Eccomi" (1972) | "Lamento d'amore" (1973) | "E poi..." (1973) |

"Lamento d'amore" (English: Lament of love) is a song by Italian singer Mina. It was written by Enrico Riccardi and Luigi Albertelli, arranged and conducted by Pino Presti. The song was released as a single in April 1973 along with the b-side "Rudy" from the 1972 album Altro, reaching number 6 on the Italian chart. "Lamento d'amore" has never been present among the tracks of any studio album, but is known for being included in the 1974 compilation Evergreens, released only on cassette. It also remained unreleased on CD until 1998, when it was included in the compilation Studio Collection.

== Track listing ==
7" single
A1. "Lamento d'amore" – 3:22
A2. "Rudy" (Guido Bolzoni) – 4:08

== Charts ==
Chart performance for "Lamento d'amore"
| Chart (1973) | Peak position |
|---|---|
| Italy (Musica e dischi) | 6 |
