= ...quando tu mi spiavi in cima a un batticuore... =

Studio album by Mina
- Released: November 1970
- Recorded: 1970
- Studio: La Basilica, Milan
- Genre: Pop
- Length: 45:06
- Language: Italian
- Label: PDU

Mina chronology
Mina canta o Brasil (1970)	...quando tu mi spiavi in cima a un batticuore... (1970)	Del mio meglio (1971)

Singles from ...quando tu mi spiavi in cima a un batticuore...
- 1. "Insieme" Released: May 1970; 2. "Una donna, una storia" Released: February 1971

...quando tu mi spiavi in cima a un batticuore... is a studio album by Italian singer Mina, released in November 1970 by PDU.

== Track listing ==
Side A
No.	Title	Lyrics	Music	Length
1.	"Nessuno al mondo"	Nino Rastelli	Jimmy Nebb	2:38
2.	"Dominga"	Paolo Limiti	Jorge Ben Jor	3:32
3.	"Io tra di voi"	Giorgio Calabrese	Charles Aznavour	4:33
4.	"L'uomo della sabbia"	Limiti	Augusto Martelli	3:52
5.	"Ero io, eri tu, era ieri"	Limiti	Martelli	4:33
6.	"Adagio"	Limiti; Giovanni Bonoldi	Vittorio Buffoli; Mario Nobile	3:32

Side B
No.	Title	Lyrics	Music	Length
1.	"Il mio nemico è ieri"	Limiti	Alessandro Gelmetti	3:05
2.	"Insieme"	Mogol	Lucio Battisti	4:07
3.	"Una donna, una storia"	Antonio Amurri	Gianni Ferrio	5:08
4.	"Che meraviglia"	Sergio Bardotti	Jorge Ben Jor; Toquinho	2:31
5.	"Mi guardano"	Leo Chiosso	Umberto Prous	3:42
6.	"Questa cosa chiamata amore"	Amurri	Ferrio	3:53
Total length:				45:06

Arranged by Augusto Martelli, except for "Insieme" (Detto Mariano), "Una donna, una storia" and "Questa cosa chiamata amore" (Gianni Ferrio).

== Charts ==
=== Weekly charts ===
Weekly chart performance for ...quando tu mi spiavi in cima a un batticuore...
Chart (1970–71)	Peak position
Italian Albums (Discografia internazionale)	1
Italian Albums (Musica e dischi)	1

=== Monthly charts ===
Monthly chart performance for ...quando tu mi spiavi in cima a un batticuore...
Chart (1971)	Peak position
Italian Albums (Musica e dischi)	1
