= Altro =

Altro may refer to:

- Altro (album), by Italian singer Mina
- Altro, Kentucky, a community in Breathitt County
- Melissa Altro, a Canadian actress and voice actress
