= Del mio meglio =

Compilation album by Mina
- Released: April 1971
- Recorded: 1968–1971
- Genre: Pop; rock
- Length: 47:11
- Label: PDU

Mina chronology
...quando tu mi spiavi in cima a un batticuore... (1970)	Del mio meglio (1971)	Mina (1971)

Del mio meglio (stylized as ...del mio meglio) is a compilation album by Italian singer Mina released in 1971 by PDU. The first in a series of compilation albums released under the "Del mio meglio" title.

The songs "Io vivrò (senza te)", "Se stasera sono qui", "Vedrai vedrai" and "Yesterday" were all recorded in 1970 during a concert at Radiotelevisione svizzera and were previously unreleased on album (as well as Mina's new hit "Io e te da soli").

== Track listing ==
Side A
No.	Title	Lyrics	Music	Original album	Length
1.	"Io vivrò senza te" (Live)	Mogol	Lucio Battisti	Previously unreleased	4:05
2.	"Se stasera sono qui" (Live)	Mogol	Luigi Tenco	Mina alla Bussola dal vivo (1968)	3:59
3.	"Vedrai vedrai" (Live)	Mogol	Tenco	Previously unreleased	4:45
4.	"Yesterday" (Live)	John Lennon; Paul McCartney	Lennon; McCartney	Previously unreleased	3:15
5.	"La voce del silenzio" (Live)	Mogol; Paolo Limiti	Elio Isola	Mina alla Bussola dal vivo (1968)	3:28
6.	"Io e te da soli"	Mogol	Battisti	Previously unreleased	4:32

Side B
No.	Title	Lyrics	Music	Original album	Length
1.	"Vorrei che fosse amore"	Antonio Amurri	Bruno Canfora	Canzonissima '68 (1968)	2:26
2.	"Un'ombra"	Limiti; Claudio Daiano	Roberto Soffici	...bugiardo più che mai... più incosciente che mai... (1969)	3:22
3.	"Bugiardo e incosciente"	Limiti	Joan Manuel Serrat	...bugiardo più che mai... più incosciente che mai... (1969)	6:16
4.	"Insieme"	Mogol	Battisti	...quando tu mi spiavi in cima a un batticuore... (1970)	4:05
5.	"Quand'ero piccola"	Franco Migliacci	Bruno Zambrini; Luis Bacalov	Canzonissima '68 (1968)	2:52
6.	"Non credere"	Mogol; Ascri	Roberto Soffici	...bugiardo più che mai... più incosciente che mai... (1969)	4:06
Total length:					47:11

== Personnel ==
- Mina – vocals (all tracks)
- Alberto Baldan Bembo – pipe organ (A1, A3, A4)
- Pino Presti – bass (A1, A3, A4)
- Ernesto Massimo Verardi – electric guitar (A1, A3, A4)
- Rolando Ceragioli – drums (A1, A3, A4)
- Mario Robbiani – arrangement, conducting (A1, A3, A4)
- Gian Piero Reverberi – arrangement (A6)
- Bruno Canfora – arrangement (B1)
- Detto Mariano – arrangement (B4)
- Luis Bacalov – arrangement (B5)
- Augusto Martelli – arrangement (A2, A5, B2, B3, B6)

== Charts ==
=== Weekly charts ===
Weekly chart performance for Del mio meglio
Chart (1971)	Peak position
Italian Albums (Discografia internazionale)	1
Italian Albums (Musica e dischi)	1

=== Monthly charts ===
Monthly chart performance for Del mio meglio
Chart (1971)	Peak position
Italian Albums (Musica e dischi)	1
