= Attila (album) =

Studio album by Mina
- Released: October 1979
- Recorded: 1979
- Studio: La Basilica, Milan
- Genre: Pop; rock; disco
- Length: 87:54
- Language: Italian; English
- Label: PDU

Mina chronology
Del mio meglio n. 5 (1979)	Attila (1979)	Kyrie (1980)

Singles from Attila
- 1. "Anche un uomo" Released: March 1979

Attila is a studio album by Italian singer Mina, released in October 1979 by PDU and distributed by EMI Italiana.

== Overview ==
The album, unlike other previously released double albums, was a novelty: it does not consist of two stand-alone albums, independent and unrelated to each other, like the "doubles" that preceded it since 1972, but is a unitary project consisting of eighteen songs divided into two discs.

"Anche un uomo" was the ending theme of the TV quiz show Lascia o raddoppia? written by Mike Bongiorno, Anselmo Genovese and TV personality Ludovico Peregrini.

"Don't Take Your Love Away" is a cover of a song written by Isaac Hayes. The song is also the longest track recorded by Mina, at nine minutes long. The track "Un po' di più" was originally sung by Patty Pravo and included on her album Sì... incoerenza in 1972. The songs "Rock and Roll Star" and "Anche tu" were also recorded by Mina in Spanish under the titles "Estrella del rock" e "También tù", respectively. At just sixteen years old, Mina's son Massimiliano Pani made his debut as a songwriter with two tracks, "Sensazioni" and "Il vento".

The album cover was created by Luciano Tallarini, on photographs of Mauro Ballets reworked with the airbrush by Gianni Ronco. The album cover won the prize for best cover of the year and is displayed at the Museum of Modern Art in New York.

Released in October 1979, Attila was an immediate success, rising to the second place of the Italian chart and entering the top ten most successful records of the year. It is one of the best-selling albums of the singer's career.

In 2024, in honor of the forty-fifth anniversary of the album's release, Warner Music released a limited edition of the album on colored vinyl. Included in the reissue was a previously unpublished additional illustration of Mina by Gianni Ronco.

== Critical reception ==
Claudio Milano from OndaRock noted that Attila was positioned as an ambitious project, but felt that the result was weak. He cited it as the starting point in what he felt was a decline in Mina's creative path. Milano called the songs "Don't Take Your Love Away" and "Shadow of My Old Road" the most worthy on the album. In 2015 Panorama magazine named Attila among the ten most fundamental albums by Mina.

== Track listing ==
=== Volume 1 ===
Side A
No.	Title	Lyrics	Music	Length
1.	"Tiger Bay"	Julie Scott	Beppe Cantarelli	6:50
2.	"Ma ci pensi"	Nino Romano	Federico Monti Arduini	4:15
3.	"Se il mio canto sei tu"	Paola Blandi	Cantarelli	4:23
4.	"Non tornerò"	Blandi	Cantarelli	6:31
Total length:				21:59

Side B
No.	Title	Lyrics	Music	Length
1.	"Che novità"	Firmo Rizzini	Danidy	4:54
2.	"Bonne nuit"	Andrea Lo Vecchio	Shel Shapiro	3:11
3.	"Sensazioni"	Valentino Alfano; Massimiliano Pani	Alfano; Pani	4:47
4.	"Un po' di più"	Sergio Bardotti	Shapiro	3:57
5.	"Il vento"	Alfano; Pani	Alfano; Pani	4:56
Total length:				21:45

=== Volume 2 ===
Side C
No.	Title	Lyrics	Music	Length
1.	"Don't Take Your Love Away"	Lee Hatim	Isaac Hayes	9:25
2.	"Rock and Roll Star"	Lo Vecchio	Shapiro	3:29
3.	"Fiore amaro"	Enrico Riccardi	Riccardi	4:03
4.	"Sei metà" (featuring Beppe Cantarelli)	Blandi	Cantarelli	5:18
Total length:				21:55

Side D
No.	Title	Lyrics	Music	Length
1.	"Anche tu"	Cristiano Minellono	Cantarelli	4:56
2.	"Street Angel"	Bobby Hart; Bobby Weinstein	Teddy Randazzo	4:45
3.	"Che volgarità"	Cristiano Malgioglio	Corrado Castellari	3:41
4.	"Anche un uomo"	Mike Bongiorno; Ludovico Peregrini; Alberto Testa	Anselmo Genovese	4:48
5.	"Shadow of My Old Road"	Rizzini	Danidy	4:05
Total length:				22:15

== Personnel ==
- Mina – vocals (all tracks)
- Beppe Cantarelli – arrangement (A1, A3, A4, B3, B5, C4, D1), vocals (C4)
- Giulio Libano – arrangement (A2)
- Rudy Brass – arrangement (B1, D5 )
- Shel Shapiro – arrangement (B2, B4, C1, C2)
- Mike Logan – arrangement (C3)
- Erich Bulling – arrangement (D2)
- Teddy Randazzo – arrangement (D2)
- Massimo Salerno – conducting (D2)
- Celso Valli – arrangement (D4)

== Charts ==
Chart performance for Attila
Chart (1979–80)	Peak position
Italian Albums (Billboard)	5
Italian Albums (Musica e dischi)	2

Annual chart rankings for Attila
Chart (1980)	Rank
Italian Albums (Musica e dischi)	10
