= ...bugiardo più che mai... più incosciente che mai... =

Studio album by Mina
- Released: November 1969
- Recorded: 1968–1969
- Studios: La Basilica, Milan
- Genre: Pop
- Length: 44:16
- Languages: Italian; Portuguese
- Label: PDU
- Producers: Augusto Martelli; Gianni Ferrio; Berto Pisano

Mina chronology
Incontro con Mina (1969)	...bugiardo più che mai... più incosciente che mai... (1969)	Mina canta o Brasil (1970)

Singles from ...bugiardo più che mai... più incosciente che mai...
- 1. "Non credere" Released: April 1969; 2. "Un'ombra" Released: October 1969; 3. "Bugiardo e incosciente" Released: February 1970; 4. "Un giorno come un altro" Released: 1970

...bugiardo più che mai... più incosciente che mai... is a studio album by Italian singer Mina, released in November 1969 by PDU.

== Overview ==
The album features only new songs, with the exception of "Un'ombra" and "I problemi del cuore", published in October as a single, and the song "Non credere", which was released as a single in April with the B-side "Dai dai domani", which was not included on the album. The singles "Bugiardo e incosciente" / "Una mezza dozzina di rose" and "Un giorno come un altro" / "Il poeta" were also released from the album, but the following year.

"Non c'è che lui" is a cover version of the song presented a few months before the release of the album by Sonia and Armando Saviniat the Sanremo Music Festival. Another cover version on the album, "Com açucar, com afeto", is sung in Portuguese. It was written by Chico Buarque and previously performed by Nara Leão.

The song "Emmanuelle" was the main theme song for the film A Man for Emmanuelle, and the song "Attimo per attimo" became the soundtrack for the film Dismissed on His Wedding Night.

The album spent 22 weeks at the top of the Italian album chart, which is one of the best figures ever, and also became the best-selling in Italy in 1970.

== Track listing ==
Side A
No.	Title	Lyrics	Music	Length
1.	"Un'ombra"	Paolo Limiti; Claudio Daiano	Roberto Soffici	3:22
2.	"Un giorno come un altro"	Nino Ferrer	Nino Ferrer	2:45
3.	"Una mezza dozzina di rose"	Mina; Limiti	Augusto Martelli	3:57
4.	"Emmanuelle"	Antonio Amurri	Gianni Ferrio	3:09
5.	"Com açucar, com afeto"	Chico Buarque de Hollanda	De Hollanda	4:15
6.	"Non c'è che lui"	Carlo Alberto Rossi	Marisa Terzi	3:40
Total length:				21:04

Side B
No.	Title	Lyrics	Music	Length
1.	"Bugiardo e incosciente"	Limiti	Joan Manuel Serrat	6:16
2.	"I problemi del cuore"	Claudio Daiano	Pino Massara	3:44
3.	"Ma è soltanto amore"	Giorgio Calabrese	Gian Franco Reverberi	2:52
4.	"Non credere"	Mogol; Luigi Clausetti	Roberto Soffici	4:06
5.	"Il poeta"	Bruno Lauzi	Lauzi	2:58
6.	"Attimo per attimo"	Amurri	Berto Pisano	3:26
Total length:				23:12

== Charts ==
=== Weekly charts ===
Weekly chart performance for ...bugiardo più che mai... più incosciente che mai...
Chart (1970–71)	Peak position
Italian Albums (Discografia internazionale)	1
Italian Albums (Musica e dischi)	1

=== Monthly charts ===
Monthly chart performance for ...bugiardo più che mai... più incosciente che mai...
Chart (1970)	Peak position
Italian Albums (Musica e dischi)	1

=== Year-end charts ===
Year-end chart performance for ...bugiardo più che mai... più incosciente che mai...
Chart (1970)	Position
Italian Albums (Musica e dischi)	1
