= Kyrie (album) =

Studio album by Mina
- Released: 27 November 1980
- Recorded: 1980
- Studio: La Basilica, Milan
- Genre: Pop; rock; disco
- Length: 75:08
- Language: Italian; English
- Label: PDU

Mina chronology
Attila (1979)	Kyrie (1980)	Del mio meglio n. 6 - Live (1981)

Singles from Kyrie
- 1. "Buonanotte, buonanotte" Released: May 1980

Kyrie is a double studio album by Italian singer Mina released on 27 November 1980 by PDU and distributed by EMI Italiana. Later the album was released in separate parts with subtitles "Vol. 1" and "Vol. 2". On this album Mina experiments with various genres, especially rock. The cover of the album features Mina's son Massimiliano Pani dressed as a hockey player.

The album reached the top ten in the weekly chart, taking 9th place, which was at that time the lowest position in the chart of all the singer's studio albums. The total sales of the album are 350,000 copies.

In 2018, Rolling Stone magazine placed it 10th on a list of Mina's most underrated albums.

== Musical content ==
The opening track "Musica" expresses a feeling of renewal. The use of the synthesizer and Mina’s voice creates an almost futuristic sound, a rarefied atmospheric sound. This atmospheric sound contrasts with the roughness of "You Keep Me Hangin' On". On this track Mina sings with a richer and gravely and coarse tone, creating a roughness to this cover of a classic song. "Quatt’ore ‘e tiempo" are more classic and traditional compositions. The lyrics tell of a sequence of images that chases almost dancing in the rhythm of the melody. Neapolitan drama away from the usual melodic Neapolitan, the song is a free implementation of the famous "Pietà signor" composed by Alessandro Stradella. "Chi sarà" is the composition by Simon Luca. The melody is charming and the simplicity of both the music and lyrics make for a great song. The layering of Mina’s voice adds an interesting layer to the production of the song. "Voglio stare bene" is a song that has similarities to the melody structure as "Bohemian Rhapsody" by Queen. The song begins dramatically and there are constant changes in the tempo, creating different hues. The Shel Shapiro penned "I Know" has a powerful chorus and with the sheer power of Mina’s voice makes for a great marriage of vocals and music. On "Tra Napoli e un bicchiere" the voices of Mina and Simon Luca play in unison to the endless intricate tones and scales to excellence. The first volume ends with "Capisco" written by Massimiliano Pani. A disco-laced track with fast-paced lyrics and a thumping beat incorporating synthesisers.

The second volume starts off with "Fermerò qualcuno". The tone is dramatic and Mina sings with a sense of loneliness that is infused in every line of the text, with a lavish and engaging musical arrangement. "L'amore è bestia, l'amore è poeta" has a reggae flavour to it, a new musical exploration for Mina. A true musical gem on this album is a cover of the Beatles "She's Leaving Home". The arrangement is more sumptuous and less saccharine than the arrangement. Paul McCartney and John Lennon liked that arrangement that they sent a telegram of congratulations to Mario Robbiani. "Qualcosa in più" is another defining moment of the album. The song structure and crescendo is musically innovative and sublime. "Colori" has Mina explore the blues. The lyrics are beautiful and the arrangement transcendent. On the track "Bambola gonfiabile" the theme of exaggeration is essential. The song speaks of a "Bambola gonfiabile" (Inflatable doll) the music and lyrics are hard rock, sung so aggressively. "Radio" is a song which lyrics are centred on jealousy. Touching tones and atmospheres at times poignant, given away by a base d 'fabulous arches and the magical sound of the flugelhorn. "Buonanotte, buonanotte" is the ends volume two. The song has a lyrical sweetness in the verses and the sumptuousness arrangement of Massimiliano Pani.

== Track listing ==
=== Volume 1 ===
Side A
No.	Title	Lyrics	Music	Length
1.	"Musica"	Maurizio Anesa	Anesa; William Marino	5:52
2.	"You Keep Me Hangin' On"	Lamont Dozier; Eddie Holland	Brian Holland	5:55
3.	"Quatt'ore 'e tiempo"	Ettore Lombardi	Nino Romano	2:30
4.	"Chi sarà"	Simonluca	Simonluca	4:07
Total length:				18:24

Side B
No.	Title	Lyrics	Music	Length
1.	"Voglio stare bene"	Simonluca	Simonluca	3:22
2.	"I Know"	Shel Shapiro	Shapiro	5:38
3.	"Tra Napoli e un bicchiere"	Simonluca	Andrea Lo Vecchio; Simonluca	3:10
4.	"Capisco"	Massimiliano Pani	Pani	6:10
Total length:				18:20

=== Volume 2 ===
Side C
No.	Title	Lyrics	Music	Length
1.	"Fermerò qualcuno"	Marco Luberti	Beppe Cantarelli	4:12
2.	"L'amore è bestia, l'amore è poeta"	Franco Migliacci	Jimmy Fontana; Fabio Massimo Cantini; Lilli Greco	4:00
3.	"She's Leaving Home"	John Lennon; Paul McCartney	Lennon; McCartney	5:30
4.	"Qualcosa in più"	Simonluca	Simonluca	5:30
Total length:				19:12

Side D
No.	Title	Lyrics	Music	Length
1.	"Colori"	Lo Vecchio	Simonluca	5:15
2.	"Bambola gonfiabile"	Simonluca	Simonluca	3:40
3.	"Radio"	Bruno Lauzi	Cantarelli	5:10
4.	"Buonanotte, buonanotte"	Carla Vistarini	Cantini	5:07
Total length:				19:12

== Personnel ==
- Mina – vocals (all tracks), background vocals (A2, B3, C2, D2)
- Maurizio Anesa – arrangement (A1), bass guitar (A1, A2, D4)
- William Marino – arrangement (A1), guitar, guitar synthesizer, synthesizer (A1, A2, B4, D4)
- Massimiliano Pani – arrangement (A2, B4, C2, D4)
- Oscar Rocchi – arrangement (A3), keyboards (A3, B3, D2, D4), piano (A4, B1, C2, C4, D4), synthesizer (C2)
- Simonluca – arrangement (A4, B1, B3, C4, D2), background vocals (A2, B3, C2, C4, D1, D2), synthesizer (A1, B2, B3, C4, D1, D2), vocals (B3)
- Shel Shapiro – arrangement (B2), piano (B2)
- Beppe Cantarelli – arrangement (C1, D3), flugelhorn (D3), guitar (C1)
- Mario Robbiani – arrangement (C3)
- Pino Ferro – background vocals (A2, B3, C4, D1, D2)
- Silvio Pozzoli – background vocals (A2, D2)
- Rossana Casale – background vocals (B3, C4, D1)
- Luca Esposito – background vocals (B4)
- Wanda Radicchi – background vocals (B4)
- J. Scott – background vocals (B4)
- M. Teneggi – background vocals (B4)
- Paolo Donnarumma – bass guitar (A2, B1, B2, B4, C2, C4, D1, D2)
- Gigi Cappellotto – bass guitar (A3, A4, B3)
- Dino D'Autorio – bass guitar (C1, D3)
- Walter Scebran – drums (A1–A4, B1, B3, B4, C2, C4, D2, D4)
- Luqman Ali – drums (B2)
- Flaviano Cuffari – drums (C1, D3)
- Sergio Fanni – flugelhorn (C1)
- Sergio Farina – guitar (A2-A4, B1, B3, B4, C2, C4, D1, D2)
- Claudio Bazzari – guitar (B2)
- Gilberto Ziglioli – guitar (D1)
- Massimo Parretti – keyboards (A4, B1, C4, D1)
- Vittorio Bacchetta – keyboards (C1, D3), piano (C1)
- Maurizio Preti – percussion (B4)
- George Aghedo – percussion (D3)
- Abramo Pesatori – recording, mixing
- Giuseppe "Baffo" Banfi – recording, mixing
- Aldo Banfi – synthesizer (C1, D3)

Credits are adapted from the album's liner notes.

== Charts ==
Chart performance for Kyrie
Chart (1981–1982)	Peak position
Italian Albums (Billboard)	10
Italian Albums (Musica e dischi)	9
