= Un'ombra =

Single by Mina

from the album ...bugiardo più che mai... più incosciente che mai...
- Language: Italian
- B-side: "I problemi del cuore"
- Released: October 1969
- Genre: Pop
- Length: 3:22
- Label: PDU
- Composer: Roberto Soffici
- Lyricist: Paolo Limiti

Mina singles chronology
"Ebb Tide" (1969)	"Un'ombra" (1969)	"Tu non credi più" (1969)

"Un'ombra" (English: Shadow) is a song by Italian singer Mina recorded in 1969 for her studio album ...bugiardo più che mai... più incosciente che mai.... It was written by musician Roberto Soffici and lyricist Paolo Limiti. Released as a single, the song reached number nine on the Italian chart, spending 15 weeks there. The B-side of the single, "I problemi del cuore", was recorded by Mina in Spanish under the title "Los problemas del corazón".

== Track listing ==
7" single
A. "Un'ombra" – 3:22
B. "I problemi del cuore" (Pino Massara) – 3:44

== Charts ==
Chart performance for "Un'ombra"
Chart (1970)	Peak position
Italy (Discografia internazionale)	9
Italy (Musica e dischi)	9
