= Salomè (album) =

- Volume 1 cover

Studio album by Mina
- Released: November 1981
- Recorded: 2 November 1981
- Studio: La Basilica, Milan
- Genre: Pop; rock
- Length: 75:51
- Language: Italian; Spanish; English
- Label: PDU

Mina chronology
Del mio meglio n. 6 – Live (1981)	Salomè (1981)	Italiana (1982)

Alternative cover
- Volume 2 cover

Singles from Salomè
- 1. "Una canzone" Released: 1981

Salomè is a double studio album by Italian singer Mina, released in November 1981 by PDU and distributed by EMI Italiana.

== Overview ==
Salomè is Mina's last album recorded at La Basilica Studio.

By tradition, the album was released in the fall (in November), again as a double album, but later published in a split form with the notes "Vol. 1" and "Vol. 2" and different covers. This time the album was released, in addition to Italy and Spain, in Turkey and Japan (under the name Una canzone and with a different cover), but the records did not contain all the songs from the original longplay. The release of the album in the spring was preceded by the release of the single "Una canzone" with the song "Quando l'amore ti tocca" as a b-side; it became the twenty-first on the singles chart. The album rose to the second place in the weekly album chart.

The track "Esperame en el cielo" was used by Pedro Almodóvar in the film Matador (1986). The track titled "No" is an Italian cover of a song by Armando Manzanero. Mina has also recorded the tracks "Una canzone" and "Quando l'amore ti tocca" in French under the titles "Une chanson" and "Quand l'amour", respectively.

== Track listing ==
=== Volume 1 ===
Side A
No.	Title	Writer(s)	Length
1.	"Tu sarai la mia voce (Put the Weight on My Shoulders)"	Gino Vannelli; Vittorio De Scalzi	4:59
2.	"Miele su miele"	Paolo Conte	5:53
3.	"Tres palabras"	Osvaldo Farrés	3:26
4.	"Sono sola sempre"	Bruno Lauzi; Beppe Cantarelli	4:22
Total length:			18:40

Side B
No.	Title	Writer(s)	Length
1.	"Walk On By"	Hal David; Burt Bacharach	8:28
2.	"No (No)"	Armando Manzanero; Andrea Lo Vecchio	3:21
3.	"Contigo en la distancia" (featuring Angel Garcia)	César Portillo de la Luz	3:13
4.	"Così"	Edoardo De Angelis; Aldo Donati	3:33
Total length:			18:35

=== Volume 2 ===
Side C
No.	Title	Writer(s)	Length
1.	"E va bene, ti voglio"	Vito Pallavicini; Piero Cassano	5:27
2.	"Una canzone" (featuring New Trolls)	Vittorio De Scalzi; Nico Di Palo; Gianni Belleno; Ricky Belloni	4:13
3.	"Verde luna"	Vicente Gomez	2:43
4.	"Liza"	Bruno Lauzi; Nico Di Palo; Vittorio De Scalzi; Gianni Belleno; Ricky Belloni	3:33
5.	"Boy"	Maurizio Piccoli	5:13
Total length:			21:09

Side D
No.	Title	Writer(s)	Length
1.	"Uh uh" (featuring New Trolls)	Vittorio De Scalzi; Gianni Belleno; Ricky Belloni; Nico Di Palo	3:51
2.	"E tu, chi sei?"	Vito Pallavicini; Michele Vasseur; Gianni Guarnieri	4:30
3.	"Esperame en el cielo"	Paquito López Vidal	3:25
4.	"Quando l'amore ti tocca"	Dibi; Nini Carucci	3:19
5.	"Squarciagola"	Valentino Alfano; Massimiliano Pani	6:04
Total length:			21:09

== Charts ==
Chart performance for Salomè
Chart (1981–1982)	Peak position
Italian Albums (Billboard)	5
Italian Albums (Musica e dischi)	2
