= Ernesto Massimo Verardi =

Italian musician (born 1936)

- Born: 1 March 1936; Milan, Kingdom of Italy
- Origin: Milan, Italy
- Genres: Pop, jazz
- Occupations: Guitarist, composer
- Instrument: Guitar
- Years active: 1957–2005
- Label: PDU

Ernesto Massimo Verardi (born 1 March 1936) is an Italian guitarist and composer.

== Biography ==
Also known as Massimo Verardi or Ernesto Verardi, he began his career in the late 1950s, collaborating in the decades that followed in studio and tour, with numerous, renowned performers and arrangers/conductors.

He is credited in productions that have seen him play with Mina, as well as in many recordings, in several live concerts as lead guitarist; with Mia Martini, with whom in addition to 4 album, he played, at the singer's express request, in the TV show "Recital de Mia Martini", broadcast in France. Verardi also composed, with lyrics by Luigi Albertelli, the song Un altro giorno con me which gave the title to the homonym album. Studio collaborations continued with Ornella Vanoni, Shirley Bassey (after the recording in Italy of This Is My Life he participated, once again as lead guitarist, in a mini-tour, culminating with the New Year's Eve '68 concert at La Bussola Versilia by Sergio Bernardini; also, still on electric, acoustic or 12-string guitar, albums with Fabrizio De André, Milva, Mango, Gianni Bella, Pino Donaggio, Massimo Bubola, Iva Zanicchi, Pierangelo Bertoli, Nino D'Angelo, Tito Schipa Jr., Pino D'Angiò, Marcella Bella, Nikka Costa, Corrado Castellari.

Noteworthy are the collaborations with arrangers Bill Conti, Pino Presti, Gian Piero Reverberi and Augusto Martelli, in whose orchestra he played, starting in 1967, a primary role along with Johnny Sax, Pino Presti, drummer Rolando Ceragioli followed later by Tullio De Piscopo, first in recordings for Mina (until 1970) and then in those that featured Martelli himself as bandleader.

== Selected recordings in which Verardi played guitar ==
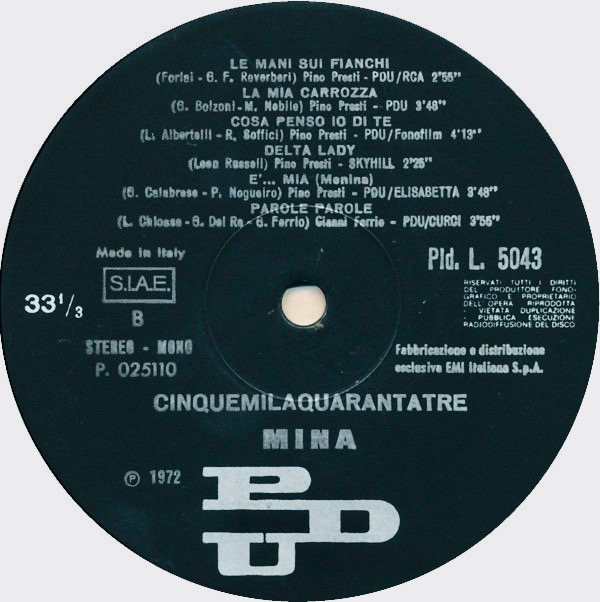
Cinquemilaquarantatre, Mina's 1972 album with Verardi on electric and acoustic guitar.

With Mina

- Dedicato a mio padre - album (1967)
- Mina alla Bussola dal vivo - album (1968)
- I discorsi - album (1969)
- Del mio meglio - album (1971)
- Mina - album (1971)
- Cinquemilaquarantatre - album (1972)
- Frutta e verdura - album (1973)
- Italiana - album (1982)
- Mina 25 - album (1983)
- "Non credere/Dai dai domani" - single (1969)
- "Un'ombra/I problemi del cuore" - single (1969)
- "L'uomo della Sabbia" - single (1970)
- "E penso a te" - single(1971)
- "Grande, grande, grande" - single (1972)

With Shirley Bassey (albums)

- This Is My Life (La vita) (1968)

With Tito Schipa Jr. (albums)

- Orfeo 9 (1973)

With Mia Martini (albums)

- È proprio come vivere (1974)
- Un altro giorno con me (1975)
- Sensi e controsensi (1975)
- Per amarti (1977)

With Ornella Vanoni (albums)

- A un certo punto (1974)

With Augusto Martelli (albums)

- Augusto Martelli & the Real Mc Coy (1974)

With Fabrizio De André (albums)

- Volume 8 (1975)

With Pino Donaggio (albums

- Certe volte... (1976

With Massimo Bubola (album)

- Nastro giallo (1976)

With Pierangelo Bertoli (albums)

- Eppure soffia (1976) -
- Certi momenti (1980)

With Donatella Rettore (albums)

- Donatella Rettore (1977)

With Gianni Bella (albums)

- Io canto e tu (1977)

With Marcella Bella (albums)

- Femmina (1977)

With Franco Simone (albums)

- Franco Simone (1979)

With Mango (albums)

- Arlecchino (1979) -
- È pericoloso sporgersi (1982)

With Pino D'Angiò (albums)

- Balla! (1981)

With Nikka Costa (albums)

- Nikka Costa (1981)

With Milva (albums)

- Milva: Das Konzert (1982)
