= Una canzone =

Single by Mina

from the album Salomè
- Language: Italian
- B-side: "Quando l'amore ti tocca"
- Released: June 1981
- Recorded: 1981
- Studio: La Basilica, Milan
- Genre: Pop
- Length: 4:05
- Label: PDU
- Composers: Gianni Belleno; Arturo Belloni
- Lyricists: Nico Di Palo; Vittorio De Scalzi
- Producer: New Trolls

Mina singles chronology
"Buonanotte, buonanotte" (1980)	"Una canzone" (1981)	"Morirò per te" (1982)

"Una canzone" (English: "The song") is a song recorded by Italian singer Mina in collaboration with the band New Trolls. The song was written by the band members, the arrangement was made by Gianfranco Lombardi. The song was released as the lead single from the 1981 album Salomè, but the release was commercially unsuccessful, reaching only number 21 on the chart, which became Mina's lowest chart position of all time. The B-side was the song "Quando l'amore ti tocca", written by Ninni Carucci and Renato Di Bitonto.

Both songs translated into French by Pierre Delanoë, respectively titled "C'est une chanson" and "Quand l'amour vous touche", were released in France as a single with the intention of including them in the new album completely in French, but the last project was almost immediately abandoned.

== Track listing ==
7" single (Italy)
A1. "Una canzone" – 4:05
B1. "Quando l'amore ti tocca" – 3:15

7" single (France)
A1. "C'est une chanson (Una canzone)" – 4:05
B1. "Quand l'amour vous touche (Quando l'amore ti tocca)" – 3:15

== Personnel ==
A1

- Mina – vocals, backing vocals
- Gianfranco Lombardi – arrangement, electric piano
- Nico Di Palo – bass guitar, backing vocals
- Gianni Belleno – drums, backing vocals
- Vittorio De Scalzi – electric piano, backing vocals
- Ricky Belloni – guitar, backing vocals

B1

- Mina – vocals
- Carmelo Carucci – arrangement, electric piano
- Giuseppe Banfi – electric piano
- Paolo Donnarumma – bass guitar
- Andrea Sacchi – guitar
- Walter Scebran – drums, percussion

Credits are adapted from the album's liner notes.

== Charts ==
Chart performance for "Una canzone"
Chart (1981)	Peak position
Italy (Musica e dischi)	21
