= Morirò per te =

Single by Mina

from the album Italiana
- B-side: "Oggi è nero"
- Released: September 1982
- Recorded: 19 July–31 August 1982
- Studio: Studi PDU, Lugano
- Genre: Italo disco
- Length: 4:20
- Label: PDU
- Songwriters: Giancarlo Bigazzi; Maurizio Piccoli

Mina singles chronology
| "Una canzone" (1981) | "Morirò per te" (1982) | "Devi dirmi di sì" (1983) |

"Morirò per te" (English: "I'll die for you") is a song by Italian singer Mina from her 1982 studio album Italiana. It was written by Giancarlo Bigazzi and Maurizio Piccoli, and although the song has an Italian title, it is completely performed in English, with the exception of the title phrase. Released as a single, the song was not a great success, becoming number fifteen on the Italian chart and staying there for only nine weeks.

== Track listing ==
7" single
A. "Morirò per te" – 4:20
B. "Oggi è nero" (Massimiliano Pani, Valentino Alfano) – 5:10

== Charts ==
Chart performance for "Morirò per te"
| Chart (1982) | Peak position |
|---|---|
| Italy (Musica e dischi) | 15 |
