= Quando quando quando =

Song by Tony Renis and Emilio Pericoli
- Language: Italian (original)
- English title: When, When, When?
- Published: 1962
- Composer: Tony Renis
- Lyricist: Mogol-Testa (Italian original)

"Quando quando quando" (or "Quando, Quando, Quando", pronounced [ˈkwando ˈkwando ˈkwando]; "When, When, When") is an Italian pop song from 1962, in the bossa nova style, with music written by Tony Renis and lyrics by Alberto Testa. The song, originally recorded in two different versions by Tony Renis and Emilio Pericoli, competed in the Sanremo Music Festival in 1962, where it placed fourth, and later became a commercial success in Italy, topping the Musica e dischi singles chart. American entertainer Pat Boone, who recorded the song in 1962, sang the English lyrics written by Ervin Drake.

== English-language versions ==
The song has been used and remixed by many artists and in many different arrangements, including English pop singer Engelbert Humperdinck in 1968. In 2005, Michael Bublé performed the song as a duet with Nelly Furtado. There is an instrumental Latin version by Edgardo Cintron and The Tiempos Noventa Orchestra. The song was a 1962 Billboard Top 100 entry by Pat Boone.

Quando is the only Italian word normally retained in most English-language renditions of the song.

Pat Boone sang the starting piece in Italian but then carried on the rest of it in English, repeating every now and again some Italian words. The Italian words sung by Boone are:

Dimmi quando tu verrai,
dimmi quando... quando... quando...
l'anno, il giorno e l'ora in cui
forse tu mi bacerai...

Fergie and will.i.am covered the song for the soundtrack to the 2009 musical film Nine, based on the stage musical based on Federico Fellini's 8½.

== Notable cover versions ==
- Tito Rodríguez, Puerto Rican singer, recorded a version in 1962 with Craft Recordings, a division of Concord Music Group, Inc.
- Bobby Curtola, Canadian singer, charted with it in 1967 (#72)
- Engelbert Humperdinck, English singer, in 1968, which he also performed on the Hollywood Palace television program on October 25, 1969. This version was remixed into a dance version in 1999, which charted at number 40.
- A brief instrumental cover of the song was used as the opening theme for the British comedy series The Comic Strip Presents.
- In the 1980 John Belushi–Dan Aykroyd film The Blues Brothers, during the effort to reform the band, Jake and Elwood find five of their members playing the song in a deserted lounge.
