= Anche un uomo =

Single by Mina

from the album Attila
- Language: Italian
- B-side: "Se il mio canto sei tu"
- Released: March 1979
- Recorded: 9–14 March 1979
- Studio: La Basilica, Milan
- Genre: Pop
- Length: 4:50
- Label: PDU
- Composer: Anselmo Genovese
- Lyricists: Mike Bongiorno; Ludovico Peregrini; Alberto Testa

Mina singles chronology
"Città vuota (It's a Lonely Town)" (1978)	"Anche un uomo" (1979)	"Buonanotte, buonanotte" (1980)

"Anche un uomo" (English: Even a man) is a song by Italian singer Mina, recorded for her studio album Attila. It was written by Anselmo Genovese, Mike Bongiorno, Ludovico Peregrini and Alberto Testa. "Anche un uomo" was released as a lead single in March 1979 and peaked at number 9 in its seventh week on the Italian chart. It was also used as a theme song of the game show Lascia o raddoppia? The song "Se il mio canto sei tu", which was written by Paola Blandi and Beppe Cantarelli, was used as a B-side.

== Track listing ==
7" single
A. "Anche un uomo" – 4:50
B. "Se il mio canto sei tu" (Paola Blandi, Beppe Cantarelli) – 4:20

== Charts ==
Initial chart performance for "Anche un uomo"
Chart (1979)	Peak position
Italy (Billboard)	10
Italy (Musica e dischi)	9

2011 chart performance for "Anche un uomo"
Chart (2011)	Peak position
Italy (FIMI)	95
