= Insieme (song) =

Single by Mina

from the album ...quando tu mi spiavi in cima a un batticuore...
- Language: Italian
- B-side: "Viva lei"
- Released: May 1970
- Genre: Pop
- Length: 4:06
- Label: PDU
- Composer: Lucio Battisti
- Lyricist: Mogol

Mina singles chronology
"Bugiardo e incosciente" (1970)	"Insieme" (1970)	"No Arms Can Ever Hold You" (1970)

Music video
- "Insieme" on YouTube

"Insieme" (English: Together) is a song by Italian singer Mina, released by PDU in May 1970 as a lead single from her studio album ...quando tu mi spiavi in cima a un batticuore.... The song became one of Mina's most successful.

== Overview ==
The lyrics to this song were written by Mogol, at the same time he wrote the song "Fiori rosa fiori di pesco". The last one was given to Lucio Battisti, and this one was given to Mina on the occasion of her thirtieth birthday. Battisti also wrote the music for "Insieme".

The single debuted at the twenty-fourth position on the Italian singles chart and peaked at number two after twelve weeks, then stayed in the top three for another nine weeks. In total, he stayed on the chart for thirty weeks.

Mina also recorded a Spanish version called "Juntos", with adapted lyrics was Julio César. This version was released as a single in Latin America, much later the songs were released in Italy in the compilations Colección latina (2001) and Yo soy Mina (2011).

The B-side was "Viva lei", written by Paolo Limiti and Mario Nobile and first released in 1998 on the album Studio Collection.

== Charts ==
=== Weekly charts ===
Weekly chart performance for "Insieme"
Chart (1970)	Peak position
Italy (Discografia internazionale)	1
Italy (Musica e dischi)	2

=== Year-end charts ===
Year-end chart performance for "Insieme"
Chart (1970)	Position
Italy (Musica e dischi)	1
