= Eccomi (song) =

Single by Mina
- B-side: "Domenica sera"
- Released: November 1972
- Genre: Pop
- Length: 3:30
- Label: PDU
- Composer: Dario Baldan Bembo
- Lyricist: Paolo Limiti

Mina singles chronology
"Parole parole" (1972)	"Eccomi" (1972)	"Lamento d'amore" (1973)

"Eccomi" (English: Here I Am) is a song recorded by Italian singer Mina. It was written by Dario Baldan Bembo and Paolo Limiti.

The song was released as a single in November 1972 by PDU. The song debuted at number sixteen on the Italian Singles chart and peaked at number five in its ninth week. In total, she stayed there for twenty-one weeks. The song was not included in any studio album by Mina, and first appeared on the compilation Del mio meglio n. 2 (1973).

This song should not be confused with the 1967 song of the same name, written by Giorgio Calabrese and Carlo Alberto Rossi and also not included in any album and remained unreleased until 1999.

The B-side was the song "Domenica sera", written by Corrado Castellari and Stefano Scandolara. In 1973, it will be included in the album Frutta e verdura. In addition, Mina recorded the song in German ("Die Liebe am Sonntag"; adapted lyrics by Bert Olden), Spanish ("Domingo a la noche"; by Doris Band) and English ("Don't Ask Me To Love You"; by Norman Newell). The German version was released in Germany as a single, the Spanish version was released only in Latin America as part of the compilation Mina canta en español (1975)., and the English version as part of the English-language compilation Mina (1978).

== Charts ==
Chart performance for "Eccomi"
Chart (1973)	Peak position
Italy (Musica e dischi)	5
