= Italiana (album) =

- Volume 1 cover

Studio album by Mina
- Released: November 1982
- Recorded: 1982
- Studio: Studi PDU, Lugano
- Genre: Pop; rock; Eurodisco
- Length: 81:00
- Language: Italian; English; Spanish
- Label: PDU

Mina chronology
Salomè (1981)	Italiana (1982)	Del mio meglio n. 7 (1983)

Alternative cover
- Volume 2 cover

Singles from Italiana
- 1. "Morirò per te" Released: September 1982

Italiana is a double studio album by Italian singer Mina, released in November 1982 by PDU and distributed by EMI Italiana.

== Overview ==
Like Mina's contemporary preceding material, the album was first released as a double LP. Thereafter the record was available as two separate albums with the titles of "Vol. 1" "vol. 2", while maintaining the same track list of the two original discs and the same cover.

"Sweet Transvestite" is a cover of a song from the soundtrack of The Rocky Horror Picture Show.

"Marrakesh" is an Italian rendition of the 1975 song "Qualquer coisa" by Brazilian musician Caetano Veloso.

The songs "Il cigno dell'amore" and "Senza fiato" were covered by Turkish singer Ajda Pekkan (respectively as "Son Yolcu" and "Düşünme Hiç" in Turkish) for her album Süperstar '83 (1983).

== Track listing ==
=== Volume 1 ===
Side A
No.	Title	Lyrics	Music	Length
1.	"Magica follia"	Andrea Lo Vecchio	Lo Vecchio	3:54
2.	"Il cigno dell'amore"	Anselmo Genovese	Genovese	4:21
3.	"Perfetto non so"	Lo Vecchio	Celso Valli	3:58
4.	"Per averti qui"	Massimiliano Pani; Valentino Alfano	Pani; Alfano	4:33
5.	"Ti dimentichi di Maria"	Pani	Valli	3:32

Side B
No.	Title	Lyrics	Music	Length
1.	"Già visto"	Pani	Valli	5:12
2.	"Morirò per te"	Giancarlo Bigazzi	Maurizio Piccoli	4:20
3.	"O qué será (À flor da pele)"	Luis Gómez-Escolar	Chico Buarque	5:24
4.	"Sapori di civiltà"	Pani; Alfano	Pani; Alfano	4:54

=== Volume 2 ===
Side C
No.	Title	Lyrics	Music	Length
1.	"Mi piace tanto la gente"	Carla Vistarini	Nat Kipner, Luigi Lopez	5:32
2.	"Sweet Transvestite"	Richard O'Brien	O'Brien	4:27
3.	"Senza fiato"	Osvaldo Miccichè; Genovese	Genovese	4:02
4.	"La vita vuota"	Lucio Tunesi	Cesare Rotondo	3:41
5.	"Marrakesh (Qualquer coisa)"	Cristiano Malgioglio	Caetano Veloso	3:07

Side D
No.	Title	Lyrics	Music	Length
1.	"It's Your Move"	Kipner	Lopez	5:11
2.	"Musica d'Argentina"	Lo Vecchio	Valli	4:36
3.	"Caro qualcuno"	Sergio Bardotti	Umberto Bindi	5:06
4.	"Oggi è nero"	Pani; Alfano	Pani; Alfano	5:10

== Personnel ==
- Mina – vocals
- Celso Valli – arrangement (A1–A3, A5, B1–B3, C3–C5, D2), keyboards (A1, A2, A5, B3, C3, D2)
- Massimiliano Pani – arrangement (A4, B4, C2, D4) guitar
- Victor Bach – arrangement (C1, D1), keyboards (C1, D1)
- Mario Robbiani – arrangement (D3), keyboards (D3)
- Naimy Hackett – background vocals (A1, A5, B1, B2, C1–C3, D1)
- Silvio Pozzoli – background vocals (A1, A5, B1, B2, C1–C3, D1)
- Marco Ferradini – background vocals (A1, A5, B1, B2, C2, C3)
- Aida Castignola – background vocals (C1, D1)
- Lella Esposito – background vocals (C1, D1)
- Gianni Farè – background vocals (C1, D1)
- Gigi Ferro – background vocals (C1, D1)
- Linda Wesley – background vocals (C1, D1)
- Gigi Cappellotto – bass (A1–A3, A5, B1, B3, C3–C5, D2, D3)
- Dino D'Autorio – bass (A4, B4, C2, D4)
- Franco Testa – bass (B2)
- Cosimo Fabiano – bass (C1, D1)
- Flaviano Cuffari – drums (A1–A3, A5, B1–B4, C1, C3–C5, D1, D2, D4)
- Bruno Bergonzi – drums (A4, C2), electronic drum, programming
- Rolando Ceragioli – drums (D3)
- Paolo Gianolio – guitar (A4, C1, C2, D1)
- Sergio Farina – guitar (A4, C1, C2, D1)
- Gigi Tonet – keyboards (A3, A5)
- Aldo Banfi – keyboards (A1–A5, B1–B4, C1–C5, D1, D2, D4)
- Pino Nicolosi – keyboards (A4, C2)
- Maurizio Preti – percussion (B1, B3, C3, C5)
- Nuccio Rinaldis – recording, mixing
- Sandro Caroli – recording (D3)
- Claudio Pascoli – saxophone (C2, D2)
- Rudy Migliardi – trombone (A4, C2, D1, D2)
- Pier Luigi Mucciolo – trumpet (D2)

Credits are adapted from the album's liner notes.

== Charts ==
Chart performance for Italiana
Chart (1982–1983)	Peak position
Italian Albums (Billboard)	11
Italian Albums (Musica e dischi)	6
