= Buonanotte, buonanotte =

Single by Mina

from the album Kyrie
- Language: Italian
- B-side: "Capisco"
- Released: June 1980
- Recorded: 27 May 1980
- Studio: La Basilica, Milan
- Genre: Pop
- Length: 5:07
- Label: PDU
- Composer: Fabio Massimo Cantini
- Lyricist: Carla Vistarini

Mina singles chronology
| "Anche un uomo" (1979) | "Buonanotte, buonanotte" (1980) | "Una canzone" (1981) |

"Buonanotte, buonanotte" (English: Goodnight, goodnight) is a song by Italian singer Mina from her studio album Kyrie. It was written by Fabio Massimo Cantini and Carla Vistarini, and arranged by Mina's seventeen-year-old son, Massimiliano Pani, for whom it was his recording debut. Released as a single from the album, it managed to reach number 9 on the chart, and stayed there for 16 weeks in total. The song "Capisco", used as a B-side, was also written and arranged by Pani.

== Track listing ==
7" single
A. "Buonanotte, buonanotte" – 5:07
B. "Capisco" (Massimiliano Pani) – 6:10

== Personnel ==
- Mina – vocals
- Massimiliano Pani – arrangement
- Maurizio Anesa – bass guitar
- Walter Scebran – drums
- Oscar Rocchi – keyboards
- William Marino – synthesizer

Credits are adapted from the album's liner notes.

== Charts ==
Chart performance for "Buonanotte, buonanotte"
| Chart (1980) | Peak position |
|---|---|
| Italy (Billboard) | 14 |
| Italy (Musica e dischi) | 9 |
