= Altro, Kentucky =

Unincorporated community in Kentucky, United States

Altro
- Unincorporated community
- Location within the state of Kentucky Altro (the United States)
- Coordinates: 37°22′51″N 83°22′56″W
- Country: United States
- State: Kentucky
- County: Breathitt
- Elevation: 791 ft (241 m)
- Time zone: UTC-6 (Eastern Standard Time)
  - Summer (DST): UTC-5 (EST)
- ZIP codes: 41306
- GNIS feature ID: 510251

Altro is an unincorporated community and coal town in Breathitt County, Kentucky, United States. Their post office closed in 1994. Altro is on the North Fork of the Kentucky River.
