= Altro (album) =

Studio album by Mina
- Released: 16 October 1972
- Recorded: 1972
- Studio: La Basilica, Milan
- Genre: Pop
- Length: 36:19
- Language: Italian
- Label: PDU

Mina chronology
Dalla Bussola (1972)	Altro (1972)	Del mio meglio n. 2 (1973)

Altro is a studio album by Italian singer Mina, released on 16 November 1972 by PDU and originally distributed by EMI Italiana with live album Dalla Bussola in a two-LP package entitled Mina 1+1; it was the first in her series of double albums.

== Track listing ==
Side A
No.	Title	Writer(s)	Length
1.	"Non ti riconosco più"	Dario Baldan Bembo; Michele Anzoino	4:10
2.	"I giorni dei falò (Long Ago and Far Away)"	James Taylor; Giorgio Calabrese	2:20
3.	"Ballata d'autunno (Balada de otoño)"	Joan Manuel Serrat; Paolo Limiti	5:40
4.	"L'amore, forse... (Ao amigo Tom)"	Marcos Valle; Osmar Milito; Calabrese	2:43
5.	"Volendo si può"	Giorgio Conte; Vito Pallavicini	3:20
Total length:			18:13

Side B
No.	Title	Writer(s)	Length
1.	"Fate piano"	Andrea Lo Vecchio; Shel Shapiro	3:50
2.	"Rudy"	Guido Bolzoni	3:32
3.	"L'abitudine (Daddy's Dream)"	Harold Stott Onward; Bruno Lauzi	3:19
4.	"Amore mio"	Bruno Canfora; Gina Basso	3:40
5.	"Ossessione '70"	Fausto Cigliano	3:45
Total length:			18:06

== Personnel ==
- Mina – vocals
- Alberto Baldan – arrangement (A1)
- Pino Presti – arrangement (A2, A5, B1)
- Natale Massara – arrangement (A3, B4, B5)
- Giulio Libano – arrangement (A4)
- Massimo Salerno – arrangement (B2, B3)
- Nuccio Rinaldis – sound engineer
- Gianni Ronco – illustrations

Credits are adapted from the album's liner notes.

== Charts ==
Chart performance for 1+1 (Altro and Dalla Bussola)
Chart (1972)	Peak position
Italian Albums (Musica e dischi)	2
