= Fiume azzurro =

- Cover art for promotional single

Song by Mina

from the album Cinquemilaquarantatre
- Language: Italian
- Released: 29 May 1972
- Recorded: May 1972
- Studio: La Basilica, Milan
- Genre: Pop
- Length: 3:57
- Composer: Enrico Riccardi
- Lyricist: Luigi Albertelli

"Fiume azzurro" (English: "Blue river") is a song recorded by Italian singer Mina for her studio album Cinquemilaquarantatre in 1972. It was written by Luigi Albertelli and Enrico Riccardi, arranged and produced by Pino Presti.

== Overview ==
The song was first performed in one of the episodes of Teatro 10 (the lyrics were slightly different from the album version), then it was repeated in another episodes. The song was also released as a promotional jukebox single, more precisely as a split, where the second side featured a song "Logan Dwight" by Logan Dwight. Mina also chose the song to be performed at the night club La Bussola on 16 September 1972, when the live album Dalla Bussola was recorded. Later a promotional video for Tassoni lemonade for the TV show Carosello was also shot using the composition.

== Critical reception ==
Claudio Milano from OndaRock highlighted the live performance from Della Bussola, noting how Mina masterfully copes with the complex structure of the song and turns it into a live classic.

== Track listing ==
7" promotional single
A1. "Fiume azzurro" – 3:58
A2. "Logan Dwight" (Donatella Luttazzi, Gianni Mereu) – 4:30

== Charts ==
Chart performance for "Fiume azzurro"
Chart (1972)	Peak position
Italy (Musica e dischi)	22

== Cover versions ==
- In 2000 Spanish singer Mónica Naranjo recorded a Spanish—language cover of a song called "Sobreviviré" for her third album Minage, which was a tribute to Mina. The author of the adapted lyrics was Jose Manuel Navarro, and the producer of the recording was Phil Manzanera. Released as a single, it debuted at number one on the Spanish chart.
