= Amor mio (song) =

Single by Mina

from the album Mina
- Language: Italian
- B-side: "Capirò"
- Released: May 1971
- Genre: Pop; blue-eyed soul
- Length: 4:46
- Label: PDU
- Composer: Lucio Battisti
- Lyricist: Mogol

Mina singles chronology
| "Una donna, una storia" (1971) | "Amor mio" (1971) | "Uomo" (1971) |

Music video
- "Amor mio" on YouTube

"Amor mio" (English: My love) is a song recorded by Italian singer Mina in 1971 for her self-titled studio album. It was written by Lucio Battisti and Mogol, and arranged by Gian Piero Reverberi.

The song was a great success in Italy, spending eighteen weeks in the top five of the singles chart. It is also considered one of Mina's signature songs. Mina recorded a Spanish version also called "Amor mío" for the Latin American music market.

The b-side of the single was a cover version of the song "I'll Be Home," in Italian called "Capirò," and composed by Randy Newman. The author of the adapted lyrics was Franca Evangelisti. The song was also included in the album Mina.

== Charts ==
Chart performance for "Amor mio"
| Chart (1971) | Peak position |
|---|---|
| Italy (Discografia Internazionale) | 2 |
| Italy (Musica e dischi) | 2 |

== Cover version ==
- In 1972, Italian singer Johnny Dorelli recorded an English version of the song called "I'm a Believer".
