= Non credere =

Single by Mina

from the album ...bugiardo più che mai... più incosciente che mai...
- Language: Italian
- B-side: "Dai dai domani"
- Released: April 1969
- Genre: Pop
- Length: 4:03
- Label: PDU
- Composer: Roberto Soffici
- Lyricists: Mogol; Luigi Clausetti
- Producer: Augusto Martelli

Mina singles chronology
"Un'ora fa" (1969)	"Non credere" (1969)	"Si..." (1969)

Music video
- "Non credere" on YouTube

"Non credere" (English: Don't believe) is a song recorded by Italian singer Mina in 1969. The song was written by Mogol, Luigi Clausetti, and Roberto Soffici.

As a single, the song was released in April 1969, by PDU. An Italian cover version of "A praça" called "Da di domani", originally performed by Nara Leão, was chosen as a B-side. Both tracks were originally included on the rare compilation Mina d'estate (1969), released only on MC and stereo 8. Later "Non credere" was included on the album ...bugiardo più che mai... più incosciente che mai... from November of the same year.

The single became number three on the Italian singles chart, as well as number twenty-seven on the Spanish chart. Among other things, the single was released in Argentina, Greece, Japan, the Netherlands and West Germany. In 1969, Mina released the song in French ("Ne la crois pas", lyrics by Eddy Marnay), in 1970 in German ("Glaube ihr nicht", by Gerhard Hagen), and in 1972 in Spanish ("No lo creas", by Julio Cèsar).

== Charts ==
=== Weekly charts ===
Weekly chart performance for "Non credere"
Chart (1969)	Peak position
Italy (Musica e dischi)	3
Spain (GEFIIF)	27

=== Year-end charts ===
Year-end chart performance for "Non credere"
Chart (1969)	Position
Italy (Musica e dischi)	1

== Cover versions ==
- In 2014, Irish singer Róisín Murphy recorded a cover version for her EP Mi Senti.
