= Bugiardo e incosciente =

Single by Mina

from the album ...bugiardo più che mai... più incosciente che mai...
- Language: Italian
- B-side: "Una mezza dozzina di rose"
- Released: 9 February 1970
- Genre: Pop
- Length: 6:16
- Label: PDU
- Composer: Joan Manuel Serrat
- Lyricist: Paolo Limiti

Mina singles chronology
"Tu non credi più" (1969)	"Bugiardo e incosciente" (1970)	"Insieme" (1970)

"Bugiardo e incosciente" (transl. "Deceitful and Reckless") is an Italian-language cover of the Spanish song "La tieta", recorded in 1967 by singer-songwriter Joan Manuel Serrat. Lyricist Paolo Limiti wrote Italian version for singer Mina, although it has little in common with the original. It was included in her 1969 album ...bugiardo più che mai... più incosciente che mai.... The song became the third single from the album in February 1970 and reached number nine on the Italian chart.

== Critical reception ==
Claudio Milano from OndaRock gave a positive review of the song, calling it a "masterpiece" with "beautiful lyrics". He noted that Mina here refuses any strictly technical research in order to achieve exceptionally sensual results, declaring "dramatic virtuosity" because the singer follows every nuance in a single word. He also stated the maturity of the performer.

== Track listing ==
7" single
A. "Bugiardo e incosciente" – 6:16
B. "Una mezza dozzina di rose" (Mina, Paolo Limiti, Augusto Martelli) – 3:57

== Charts ==
Chart performance for "Bugiardo e incosciente"
Chart (1970)	Peak position
Italy (Discografia internazionale)	8
Italy (Musica e dischi)	9
