= Grande, grande, grande =

1972 single by Mina

Single by Mina

from the album Mina
- Language: Italian
- B-side: "Non ho parlato mai"
- Released: January 1972
- Recorded: 1971
- Genre: Pop
- Length: 3:57
- Label: PDU
- Songwriters: Alberto Testa; Tony Renis

Mina singles chronology
"Uomo" (1971)	"Grande, grande, grande" (1972)	"Parole parole" (1972)

"Grande, grande, grande" (English: "Great, Great, Great") is a 1972 Italian song written and composed by Alberto Testa and Tony Renis. It was a number-one hit for Mina in Italy, and for Shirley Bassey in the United Kingdom, United States, and Australia, where it was released under the title "Never Never Never". The 1973 Shirley Bassey single achieved sales of over 50,000 copies in Australia, making it eligible for a Gold Disc certification.

== Mina version ==
"Grande, grande, grande" was a number-one hit on the Italian singles chart for Mina in 1972, serving as the lead track from her number-one self-titled studio album. Released in early 1972, the single entered the top ten during the week of 26 February 1972.

... it was thanks to the work of a young bass guitar player, Pino Presti, who offered a more modern musical arrangement, that finally made Mina agree to performing it.

— Hit Parade Italia

Following a steady ascent to number two—behind John Lennon's "Imagine"—on 11 March, the song temporarily dropped two places to number four due to competing hits by Delirium, Nicola Di Bari, and Nada. By 1 April, the song returned to its peak position at number two, where it remained throughout April before reaching number one on 29 April.

"Grande, grande, grande", which featured an arrangement by Pino Presti, topped the charts for the first three weeks of May. It was displaced from the top spot during the week of 27 May by "I giardini di marzo", a track by her frequent collaborator Lucio Battisti, alongside her own concurrent hit "Parole parole", dropping the song to number three. "Grande, grande, grande" remained within the top ten until the week of 8 July, frequently alternating chart positions with "Parole parole". By the end of the year, only "Il Padrino" by Santo & Johnny had spent more time on the charts, leaving "Grande, grande, grande" as the second biggest-selling hit of 1972 on the Italian singles chart.

Mina also recorded the song in both English and Spanish. A French-language cover version, featuring lyrics penned by Charles Aznavour, was recorded in 1974 by Mireille Mathieu.

== Personnel ==
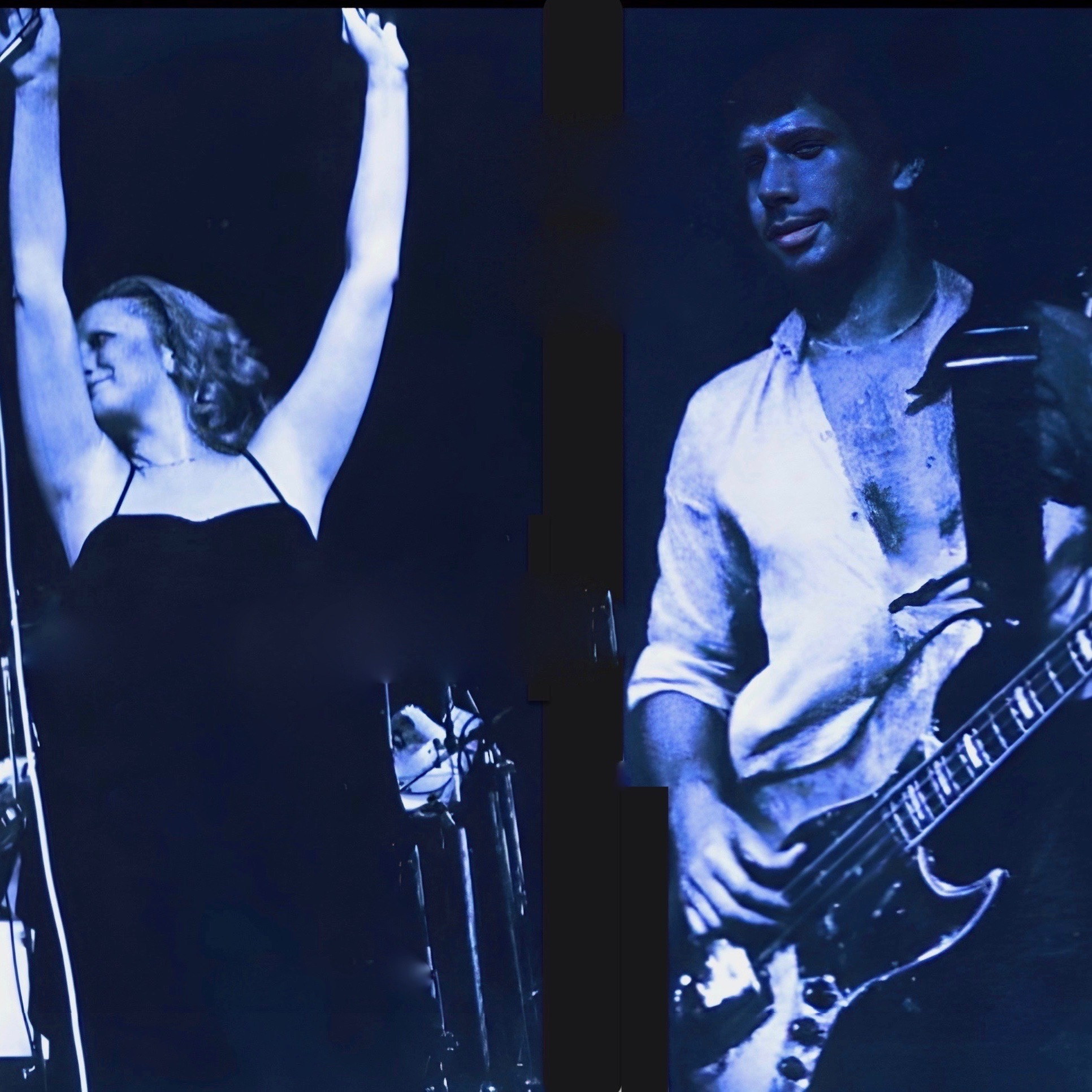
Mina and Pino Presti

- Mina – vocals
- Pino Presti – arrangement, orchestra conductor, bass
- Dario Baldan Bembo – organ
- Andrea Sacchi – electric and acoustic guitar
- Massimo Verardi – electric guitar
- Bruno De Filippi – harmonica
- Gianni Cazzola – drums
- Mario Lamberti – congas
- Gianni Bedori – flute
- Al Korvin, Oscar Valdambrini, Fermo Lini, Giuliano Bernicchi – trumpets
- Sergio Almangano, Arturo Prestipino Giarritta – first violins
- Nuccio Rinaldis – sound engineer

== Charts ==
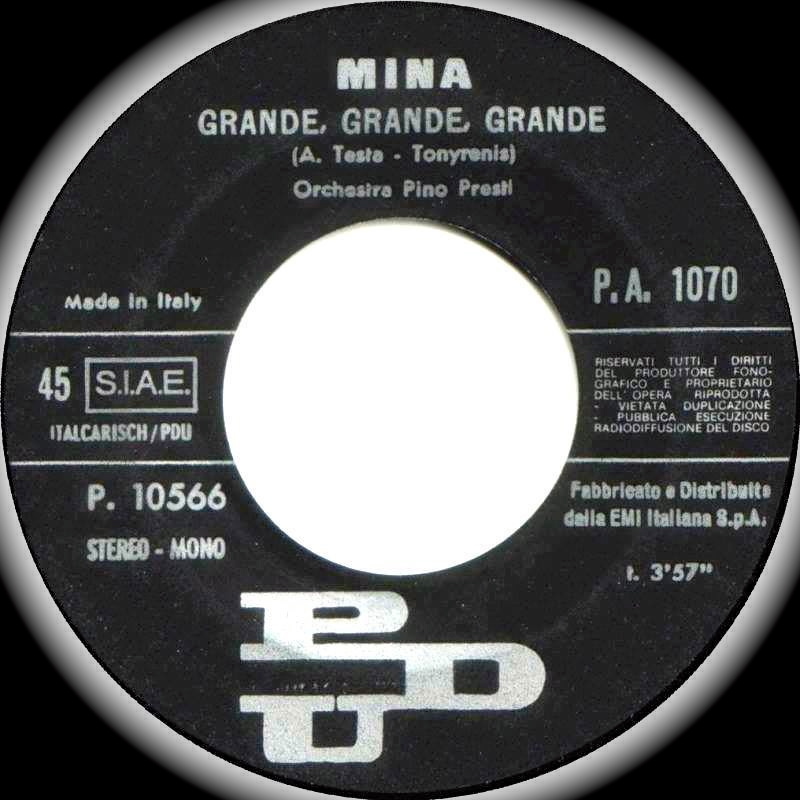
Original label (1972)

=== Weekly charts ===
Weekly chart performance for "Grande, grande, grande"
Chart (1972)	Peak position
Italy (Discografia internazionale)	1
Italy (Musica e dischi)	1

=== Year-end charts ===
Year-end chart performance for "Grande, grande, grande"
Chart (1972)	Position
Italy (Cash Box)	2
Italy (Musica e dischi)	1

== Certifications and sales ==
Certifications for "Grande, grande, grande"
Region	Certification	Certified units/sales
Italy (FIMI) Sales from 2009	Gold	50,000^{‡}
^{‡} Sales+streaming figures based on certification alone.

== Shirley Bassey version ==
"Never Never Never"
- Cover art for Dutch release

Single by Shirley Bassey

from the album Never Never Never
- B-side: "Day By Day"
- Released: February 1973
- Genre: Pop
- Length: 3:35
- Label: United Artists
- Songwriters: Alberto Testa; Norman Newell; Tony Renis
- Producer: Noel Rogers

Shirley Bassey singles chronology
"Jezahel" (1973)	"Never Never Never" (1973)	"Make the World a Little Younge" (1973)

Official audio
- "Never, Never, Never (Grande, Grande, Grande)" on YouTube

Shirley Bassey achieved a number-eight hit on the UK Singles Chart with "Never Never Never", an English-language version featuring lyrics penned by Norman Newell. The single reached number one in Australia, number two in South Africa, and number three in Singapore. It also became her only single to appear on three distinct charts in the United States, peaking at number 48 on the Billboard Hot 100, number eight on the Adult Contemporary chart, and number 67 on the R&B chart.

=== Charts ===
Chart performance for "Never Never Never"
Chart (1973)	Peak position
Australia (Kent Music Report)	1
Belgium (Ultratop 50 Flanders)	29
Ireland (IRMA)	12
Netherlands (Dutch Top 40)	15
Netherlands (Single Top 100)	13
Singapore (Rediffusion)	3
South Africa (Springbok Radio)	2
UK Singles (Official Charts)	8
US Adult Contemporary (Billboard)	8
US Billboard Hot 100	48
US Hot R&B/Hip-Hop Songs (Billboard)	67
West Germany (GfK)	48

== Other cover versions ==
- Orietta Berti
- Mary Byrne for the album ...with Love
- Vikki Carr
- Chiara Civello, as "Never Never Never" for her 2014 album Canzoni
- Celine Dion with Luciano Pavarotti, as "I Hate You Then I Love You" for her 1997 album Let's Talk About Love
- Sergio Franchi, as "Never Never Never" on his 1976 album 20 Magnificent Songs
- John Holt, as "Never Never Never"
- Julio Iglesias with Nana Mouskouri, as well as solo versions in Spanish, English, Italian, Portuguese, and French
- Mireille Mathieu, as "Folle, follement heureuse"
- David McAlmont for his album Set One: You Go to My Head
- Erlend Øye
- Pimpinela
- Zizi Possi for the album Passione
- Conny Vandenbos, as "Waarom waarom waarom" on her 1974 album Een vrouw van deze tijd
- Wolter Kroes, as "Niemand Anders" on his 2000 album Niemand Anders
- Dana Winner with Frank Galan
