= Parole parole =

Single by Mina and Alberto Lupo

from the album Cinquemilaquarantatre
- B-side: "Adagio"
- Released: April 1972
- Genre: Pop
- Length: 3:55
- Label: PDU
- Composer: Gianni Ferrio
- Lyricists: Leo Chiosso; Giancarlo Del Re

Mina and Alberto Lupo singles chronology
"Grande grande grande" (1972)	"Parole parole" (1972)	"Eccomi" (1972)

Music video
- "Parole parole" on YouTube

"Parole parole" (Italian: [paˈrɔːle paˈrɔːle]; transl. "Words words") is a duet song originally performed by Italian singer Mina and actor Alberto Lupo. It was released in April 1972 by PDU, and later was included on Minas's twenty-first studio album Cinquemilaquarantatre (1972). The song was written by Gianni Ferrio, Leo Chiosso and Giancarlo Del Re.

In 1973, Dalida and Alain Delon recorded the song in French as "Paroles, paroles", which became an international hit and a standard in France.

== Original version ==
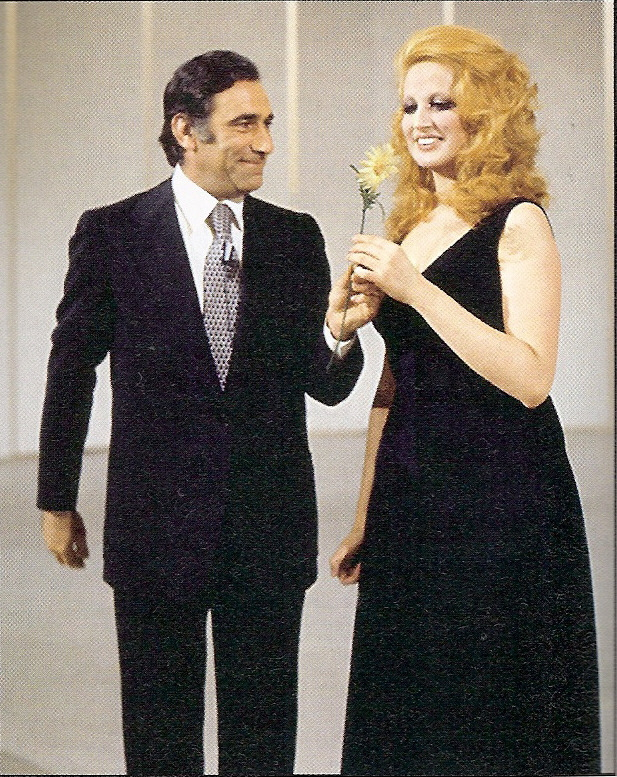
Mina and Alberto Lupo in 1972

The lyrics were written by Leo Chiosso and Giancarlo Del Re, the authors of the Italian Teatro 10 series of TV variety nights. The music and the score were by Gianni Ferrio, the conductor of the Teatro 10 orchestra. In spring 1972, the song was the closing number of all eight of the Teatro 10 Saturday nights. The song is an easy listening dialogue of Mina's singing with Alberto Lupo's spoken declamation. The song's theme are hollow words. It intertwines the female singer's lamentation of the end of love and the lies she has to hear, while the male actor compliments her and begs her to listen. She reacts and scoffs at the compliments that he gives her, calling them simply empty words – parole. The single was released in April 1972 under PDU, Mina's independent record label to become a top hit in Italian charts. The song was also published as one of the standout tracks of Mina's Cinquemilaquarantatre album and included in the I'm Not Scared movie soundtrack.

== Charts ==
=== Weekly charts ===
Weekly chart performance for "Parole parole"
Chart (1972)	Peak position
Italy (Discografia Internazionale)	1
Italy (Musica e dischi)	1

=== Year-end charts ===
Year-end chart performance for "Parole parole"
Chart (1972)	Position
Italy (Musica e dischi)	17

== Certifications ==
Region	Certification	Certified units/sales
Italy (FIMI)	Gold	35,000^{‡}
^{‡} Sales+streaming figures based on certification alone.

== Cover versions ==
After Mina released "Parole parole" in 1972, the same year several Spanish and Portuguese covers appeared which did not achieve success. A parody version of the song was performed by Mina and Lupo alongside Adriano Celentano on the penultimate Teatro 10 show on 6 May 1972. The Italian version received three little-noticed covers, the first in 1991. In 2006, Mina collaborated with footballer Javier Zanetti in a Spanish cover of the song, included in the album Todavía. The cover went on to be certified Gold by FIMI in 2021.

In 1973, "Paroles, paroles", with the lyrics translated into French by Michaële, was recorded by Dalida with Alain Delon. The track became a hit in France, Japan, Mexico and Canada, and sparked numerous covers in various languages, mostly due to Dalida's international career. Since then, the song has been covered dozens of times, almost all releases crediting "Paroles, paroles" by Dalida.

Below is a list of versions based on the original Italian release.

- Two Portuguese versions were recorded in 1972, one translated as "Palavras, palavras", sung by Brazilians Maysa and Raul Cortez, and one under the original title "Parole, parole", performed by Portuguese Tonicha and João Perry. Portuguese singer Ágata, with Vitor Espadinha, recorded a cover version in 2009 ("Promessas, promessas").
- In 1973, Turkish singer Ajda Pekkan released a Turkish-language version with actor Cuneyt Turel titled "Palavra, Palavra".
- In 1973, Spanish actress and singer Carmen Sevilla released a Spanish-language version with Francisco "Paco" Rabal titled "Palabras, palabras". This version was in turn covered by Argentine singer Silvana Di Lorenzo as well as Lupita D'Alessio and Jorge Vargas during their marriage. A different version with the same title was included by Ecuadorian singer Hilda Murillo in her 1973 album Palabras, palabras.
- A Hungarian version from the 1970s, titled like the original, was performed by Viktória Vincze and popular actor Sándor Lukács.
- A Slovene version by Slovenian singer Elda Viler with actor Boris Cavazza, titled "Besede, besede", was included on her 1982 album Elda in 1982. This song was re-recorded in 2014 by the band Pliš (with lead singer Aleksandra Ilijevski) with actor Jurij Zrnec.
- In Croatia, the song was fully recorded with the original Italian lyrics by singer Ksenija Erker and actor Relja Bašić, appearing on Ksenija Erker's 1991 LP Ciao Italia. In 2006, the song was translated to Croatian and covered by soul group Rivers with male vocals of Massimo Savić.
- In 1998, Italian group Flabby covered it in English as "Miss You All the Time" on their album Modern Tunes for Everybody.
- Cypriot Anna Vissi and Greek Thanasis Alevras covered the Italian-language version for the main title of Annita Pania's 2015 TV show Parole.
