= Tony Renis =

Italian singer

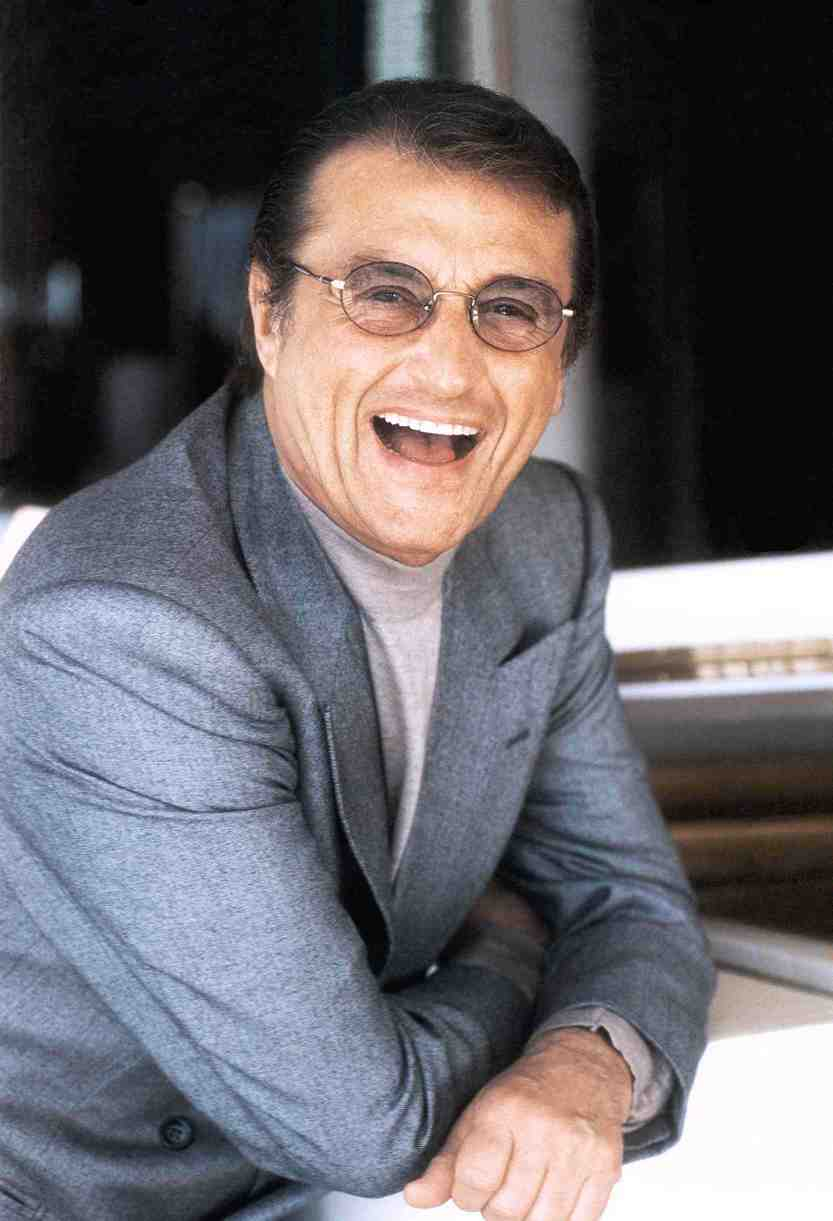
- Tony Renis in the 1990s

Background information
- Born: Elio Cesari; 13 May 1938 (age 88); Milan, Kingdom of Italy
- Genres: Adult contemporary; pop; vocal
- Occupations: Musician; songwriter; record producer
- Instrument: Vocals
- Years active: 1958–2004
- Labels: Combo Record; La voce del padrone; RCA Italiana; Numero Uno; Ariston; EMI Italiana; Warner Bros.; et al.

Elio Cesari (born 13 May 1938), known by his stage name Tony Renis, is an Italian singer, composer, music producer, and film actor.

== Life and career ==
Renis was born in Milan. In the mid-1950s he met with Adriano Celentano, and the two started performing an impression of Dean Martin and Jerry Lewis. In 1958, he was signed by the label "Combo Records", and released a few cover versions of Italian and American rock 'n' roll songs as lead vocalist of the band Combos. In 1961, Renis debuted at the Sanremo Music Festival with the song "Pozzanghere".

In 1962, Renis returned to the Sanremo Music Festival where he gained international recognition with the song "Quando, quando, quando", written with Alberto Testa. One year later, he won the Festival with the song "Uno per tutte", and, in 1967, he finished second with the song "Quando dico che ti amo".

In 1972, Renis and Testa composed the song "Grande grande grande". It was successfully interpreted by Mina, and later by Shirley Bassey as "Never Never Never". Over the years "Grande grande grande" have been covered by Marina Dale, Vikki Carr, Celine Dion with Luciano Pavarotti, Julio Iglesias, Patrizio Buanne with Renee Olstead, among others.

In 1974, he won the Nastro d'Argento for the Best Score for his work on the soundtrack of the film Brothers Blue.

In the 1980s, Tony Renis temporarily retired from performing and mainly worked as music producer. In 1981 he launched the career of child prodigy Nikka Costa.

In 1999, Renis received a Golden Globe Award and was nominated for an Oscar for the song "The Prayer", performed by Celine Dion and Andrea Bocelli, from the Quest for Camelot film soundtrack.

In 2005, he won a David di Donatello for the song "Merry Christmas in Love" from the film Christmas in Love. The song was also nominated for Best Original Song at the 63rd Golden Globe Awards.

In 2016 Renis received the America Award of the Italy-USA Foundation.

== Discography ==
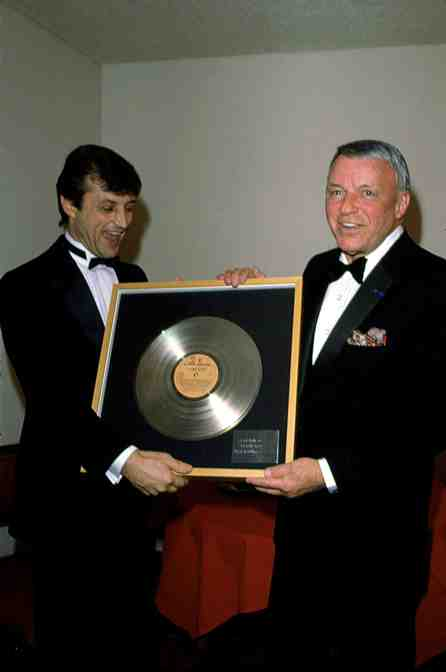
Tony Renis and Frank Sinatra celebrating a Gold record in 1985.

=== Albums (Italy) ===
- 1969: Tony Renis (RCA Italiana, PSL 10435)
- 1974: Graffiti (EMI Italiana, 3C 048-51500
- 1976: Tony Renis (RCA Italiana, TCL 1–1078)
- 1976: Un grande grande grande Tony Renis (RCA Lineatre, NL 31078)
- 1989: Le più belle di Tony Renis (EMI Italiana, 7931031)

=== Singles (Italy) ===
- 1958: Come prima/Ti dirò (Combo Record, 5057; with Combos)
- 1958: Prendi quella stella/Tipitipitipso (Combo Record, 5058; with Combos)
- 1958: Magic Moments/Oggi o mai più (Combo Record, 5091; with Combos)
- 1958: Clopin clopant/Tutto è diverso (Combo Record, 5092; with Combos)
- 1958: Prendi quella stella/Ti dirò (Combo Record, 5093; with Combos)
- 1959: Nessuno al mondo/Addio Maria (La voce del padrone, 7MQ 1224)
- 1959: Morir d'amor/Ti prego, amore (La voce del padrone, 7MQ 1229)
- 1960: Tenerezza/Cuore in blue jeans (La voce del padrone, 7MQ 1379)
- 1961: Pozzanghere/Lei (La voce del padrone, 7MQ 1525)
- 1961: Piccolo indiano/15 anni (La voce del padrone, 7MQ 1657)
- 1962: Quando quando quando/Blu (La voce del padrone, 7MQ 1689)
- 1962: Tango per favore/Amor amor amor (La voce del padrone, 7MQ 1708)
- 1963: Perché perché/Gli innamorati sono angeli (La voce del padrone, 7MQ 1776)
- 1963: Uno per tutte/Le ciliegie (La voce del padrone, 7MQ 1777)
- 1964: Bikini e tamurè/Un ragazzino (La voce del padrone, 7MQ 1819)
- 1964: Le ciliegie/Gli innamorati sono angeli (La voce del padrone, 7MQ 1823)
- 1964: Ti guardero nel cuore/Otto e mezzo (La voce del padrone, 7MQ 1846)
- 1964: Sorrisi di sera/Ti chiedo scusa (La voce del padrone, MQ 1867)
- 1964: Non sei mariu' stasera/Baciamoci signorina (La voce del padrone, MQ 1882)
- 1964: Amo Milano/Nostalgia di Milano (Oh mamma mia) (La voce del padrone, MQ 1893)
- 1965: Il garofano rosso/Nessun'altra che te (RCA Italiana, PM 3318)
- 1967: Quando dico che ti amo/Mi perderai (RCA Italiana, PM 3389)
- 1967: Non mi dire mai good bye/Prima di domani (RCA Italiana, PM 3403)
- 1968: Il posto mio/Che notte sei (RCA Italiana, PM 3439)
- 1968: Frin frin frin/Cosa non-farei (RCA Italiana, PM 3456)
- 1969: L'aereo parte/Un ragazzo che ti ama (Numero Uno, ZN 50015)
- 1970: Canzone blu/Dove sei stata Susy (Numero Uno, ZN 50019)
- 1970: Venere/Amami per favore (Numero Uno, ZN 50034)
- 1972: Un uomo tra la folla/Grande grande grande (Numero Uno, ZN 50145)

=== EPs (Italy) ===
- 1959: Ti prego, amore/Elena sono solo/Io cerco te/Romanzo d'amore (La voce del padrone, 7E MQ 124)
- 1962: Quando quando quando/Tango per favore/Blu/Amor amor amor (La voce del padrone, 7E MQ 239)
- 1963: Uno per tutte/Le ciliegie/Perché perché/Gli innamorati sono angeli (La voce del padrone, 7E MQ 254)

=== Albums (International market) ===
- 1964: Tony Renis (EMI, CLP 1754; published in Great Britain)
- 1969: Chin-chin quechiquitin (RCA Victor, MIL/S 4051; published in Mexico)

=== Singles (International Market) ===
- 1963: Uno per tutte/Perché perché (His Master's Voice, 63072; published in Spain)
- 1967: Quando dico che ti amo/Mi perderai (RCA Victor, MA 4073; published in Lebanon)
- 1967: Quando dico che ti amo/Mi perderai (RCA Victor, 3-10202; published in Spain)
- 1970: Cancion azul/Las noches de oro (RCA Victor, 3-10504; published in Spain)
- 1971: Venise va mourir/Anonimo veneziano (CBS, 7606; published in France)
- 1972: Grande grande grande/Un hombre entre la gente (Hispavox, HS 843; published in Spain)

=== EPs (International market) ===
- 1962: Quando quando quando/Blu/Anch'io/Amor amor amor (A voz do dono, 7LEG 6019; published in Portugal)
- 1963: Uno per tutte/Perche perche/Quando, quando, quando/Dancing (Tango per favore) (His Master's Voice, 7EG 8799; published in Great Britain)
- 1963: Uno per tutte/Le ciliegie/Perché perché/Gli innamorati sono angeli (His Master's Voice, 7 EGS 271;published in Sweden)
- 1963: Uno per tutte/Perché perché/Tango per favore/La tua mano (Cheque Disque, EMF 336; published in France)
- 1964: Otto e mezzo/Un muchachito/Sorrisi di sera/Ti guarderò nel cuore (A voz do dono, 7LEM 3130; published in Portugal)

== Sports work ==
He composed the AC Milan Anthem - Milan Milan in 1988

== Filmography ==
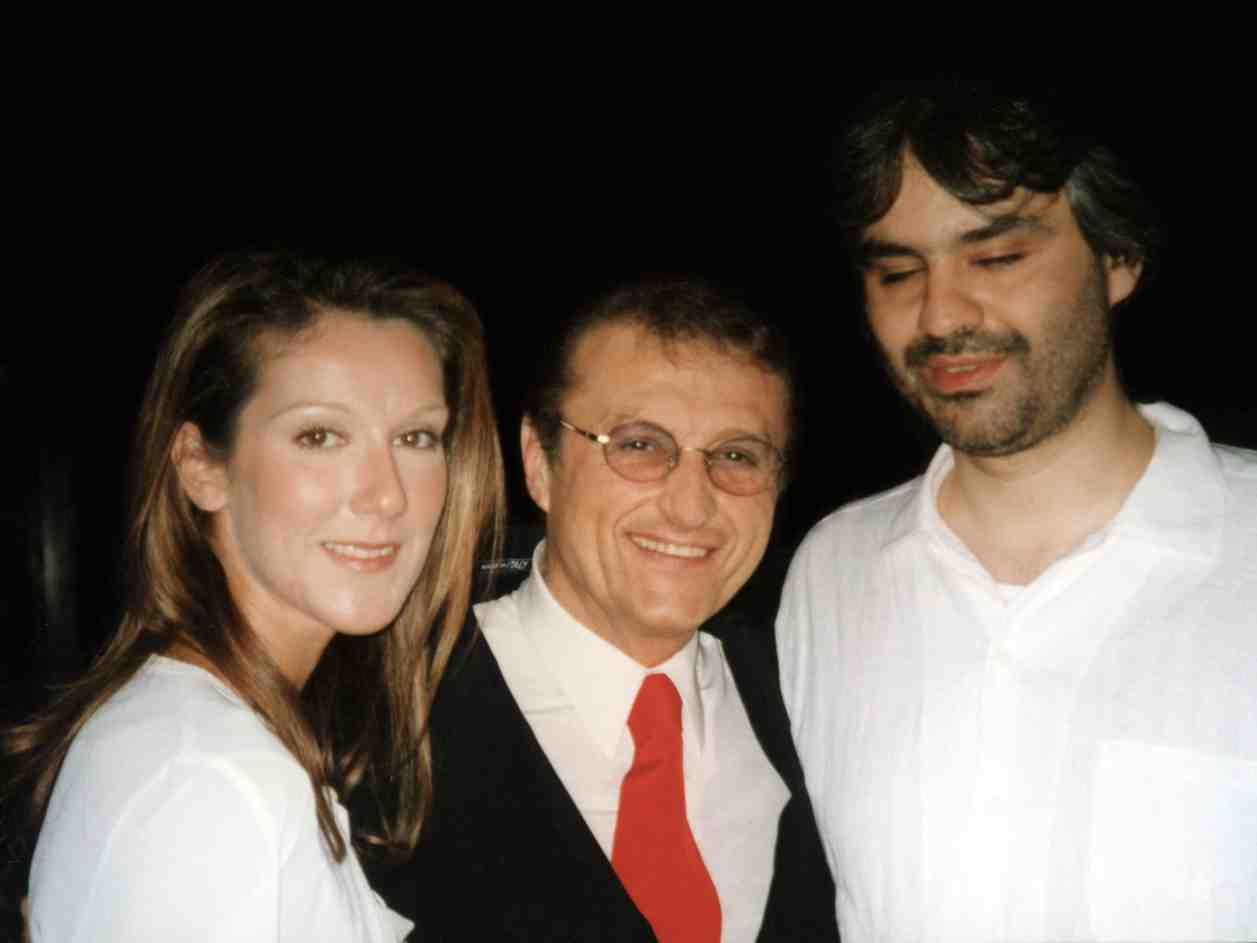
Tony Renis with Celine Dion and Andrea Bocelli in 2002.

- Io bacio... tu baci, directed by Piero Vivarelli (1961)
- Appuntamento in riviera, directed by Mario Mattoli (1962)
- Obiettivo ragazze, directed by Mario Mattoli (1963)
- Ischia operazione amore, directed by Vittorio Sala (1966)
- Quando dico che ti amo, directed by Giorgio Bianchi (1967)
- La ragazza del bersagliere, directed by Alessandro Blasetti (1967)
- Non mi dire mai goodbye, directed by Frank G. Carrol (1967)
- Per amore... per magia..., directed by Duccio Tessari (1967)
- Totò Ye Ye, directed by Daniele D'Anza (1967, Television film)
- The Black Corsair, directed by Sergio Sollima (1976)
