= Leo Chiosso =

Italian lyricist (1920–2006)

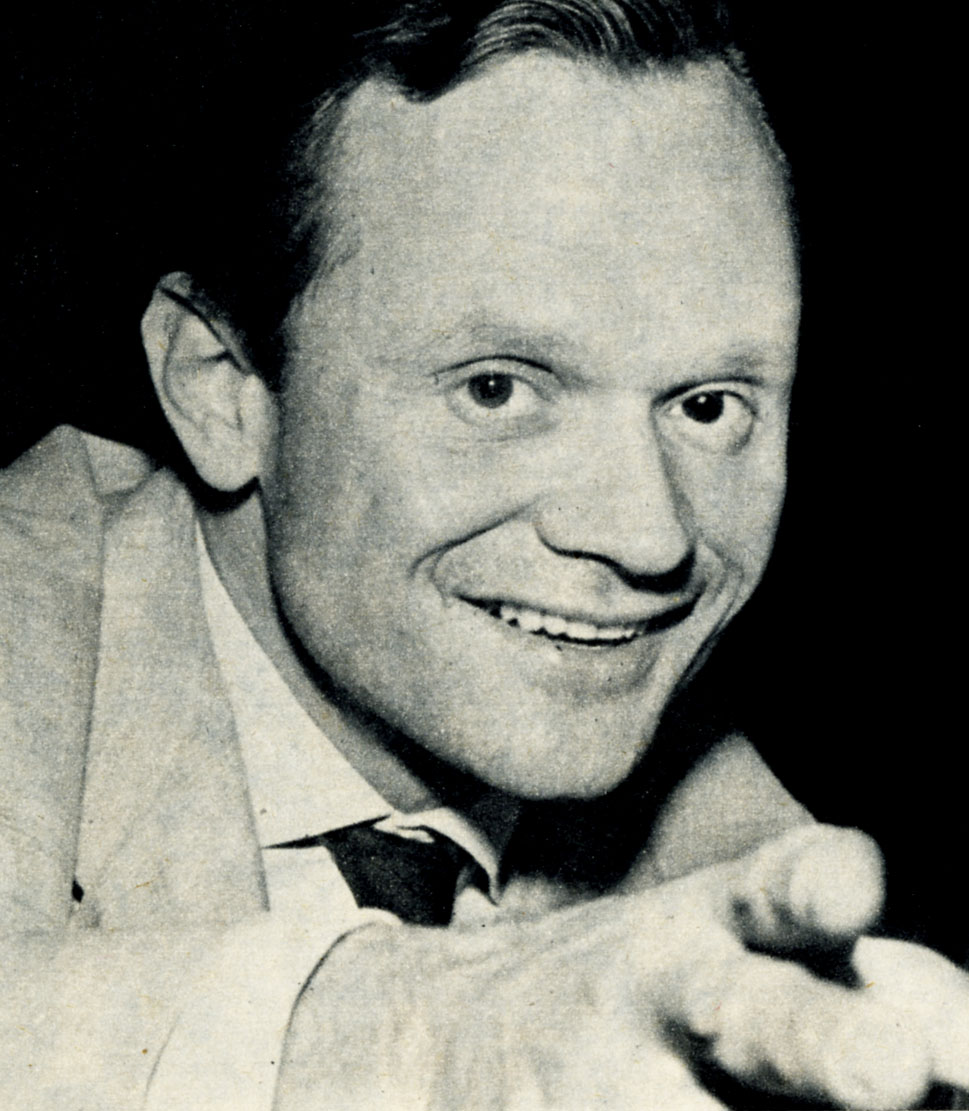
- Chiosso in 1962
- Born: Leo Matteo Chiosso; 8 August 1920; Chieri, Piedmont, Kingdom of Italy
- Died: 26 November 2006 (aged 86); Chieri, Piedmont, Italy
- Occupation: Lyricist

Leo Matteo Chiosso (Italian pronunciation: [ˈlɛːo ˈkjɔsso]; 8 August 1920 – 26 November 2006) was an Italian lyricist mostly known for his work with Fred Buscaglione. They formed a songwriting duo who produced about forty songs and created Buscaglione's public persona, a humorous tough guy with a penchant for whisky and women.

== Career ==
Chiosso and Buscaglione met in 1938 in the night-club scene of Turin, hometown to both of them. At that time, Chiosso was a university student, while Buscaglione made a living as a jazz singer and musician in the clubs.

During World War II, Chiosso was deported to Poland, while Buscaglione ended up in a US internment camp in Sardinia. Chiosso received news of his friend's fate thanks to the radio; Buscaglione had joined the allied radio station orchestra in Cagliari, and Chiosso knew he was still alive when he heard him playing.

Chiosso and Buscaglione reunited in Turin after the end of the war, and started writing songs together. Chiosso's lyrics were inspired by the American crime fiction of which he was an avid reader, as well as by current news. They were humorous stories about gangsters and their babes, New York City and Chicago, tough men who were ruthless with enemies but easily fell victims to a woman's charms. The duo's songs matched Buscaglione's carefully constructed image of an amiable braggart.

The first Buscaglione-Chiosso hit was "Che bambola" of 1956, which brought Buscaglione to nationwide celebrity. It was followed by many other hits, including "Che notte", "Criminalmente bella", "Il dritto di Chicago", "Eri piccola così", '"Lontano da te", "Love in Portofino", "Porfirio Villarosa", "Sgancia e pedala", "Teresa non sparare", and "Whisky facile".

Their last work together was the movie Noi duri of 1960, featuring Buscaglione and the Italian actor Totò. Chiosso wrote both the story and the script for the movie, as well as the lyrics for two songs of the soundtrack, "Noi duri" and "Ninna nanna del duro". The making of the movie was still in progress when Buscaglione died in a car crash.

Chiosso's career continued, writing lyrics for famous songs such as "Parole, parole", "Torpedo blu", and "Montecarlo". He was also a prolific television author, with his credits including the popular music show Canzonissima. He also wrote stories and scripts for cinema.
