= Enrico Riccardi =

Italian composer and record producer (1934–2019)

- Born: 27 March 1934; Tortona, Piedmont, Kingdom of Italy
- Died: 17 March 2019 (aged 84); Aglientu, Sardinia, Italy
- Occupations: Composer; singer-songwriter; record producer
- Years active: 1960s–1980s

Enrico Riccardi (27 March 1934 – 17 March 2019) was an Italian composer, singer-songwriter and record producer.

== Life and career ==
Born in the Piedmontese city of Tortona in 1934, Riccardi started his career as a singer-songwriter in the early 1960s, using the stage name Rico Riccardi. He later was a member of Gianni Morandi's backing band. He had his breakout with "Zingara", a song he composed with Luigi Albertelli which won the nineteenth edition of the Sanremo Music Festival, with a double performance by Bobby Solo and Iva Zanicchi. In 1970, he started a long collaboration with Drupi, for whom he penned the major hits "Vado via", "Piccola e fragile", "Sereno è..." and "Sambariò". He also had a long professional association with Mina, for whom he wrote "Fiume azzurro", "Ma che bontà", "Uomo" and "Uappa", among others. Artists with whom he collaborated as a songwriter also include Petula Clark, Patty Pravo, Caterina Valente, Loredana Bertè, Caterina Caselli, Johnny Dorelli, Dik Dik, Marisa Sannia, and Donatello.

In 1976, Riccardi co-founded the record label Real Music with Drupi and Albertelli. His main successes as a producer were Milva's "La filanda" and Mal's "Parlami d'amore Mariù". In 1980, he recorded his only album as a singer-songwriter, "Parapapà". In the 1980s, he focused on television, composing background music and theme songs for series and variety shows. He also composed incidental music for several stage plays by Giorgio Strehler.

Riccardi died in Aglientu, in the Gallura region of Sardinia, in March 2019. He had permanently moved there three decades earlier.
