= Alberto Testa (lyricist) =

Italian lyricist

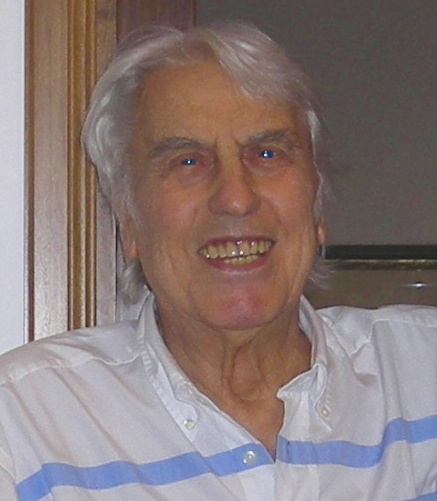
Alberto Testa in July 2009.

Alberto Testa (11 April 1927 – 19 October 2009) was a Brazilian-born Italian composer, lyricist, singer, and writer for television.

Born at Santos, São Paulo, Brazil, he was known primarily for his work as a lyricist. His words were set by such songwriters as Tony Renis (such as "Quando, quando, quando" and "Grande grande grande") and Memo Remigi. Shirley Bassey and Mina are among the singers who performed his songs.

He also wrote songs for such artists as Luciano Pavarotti, Andrea Bocelli, and Celine Dion (such as "The Prayer" and "I Hate You Then I Love You"). "The Prayer", performed in 1998 by Celine Dion and Andrea Bocelli — which Testa co-wrote with David Foster, Tony Renis, and Carole Bayer Sager — won the Golden Globe Award for Best Original Song at the 56th Golden Globe Awards.

He died in Rome on 19 October 2009.
