= Luigi Albertelli =

Italian lyricist (1934–2021)

- Born: 21 June 1934; Tortona, Piedmont, Kingdom of Italy
- Died: 19 February 2021 (aged 86); Tortona, Piedmont, Italy
- Occupations: Songwriter; television author
- Years active: 1960s–1980s

Luigi Albertelli (21 June 1934 – 19 February 2021) was an Italian songwriter and television author.

== Biography ==
Born in Tortona, in the Province of Alessandria, Albertelli debuted as a lyricist in the second half of the 1960s and got his first success in 1969 with the song "Zingara", a collaboration with Enrico Riccardi which won the nineteenth edition of the Sanremo Music Festival and was a number 1 hit.

Characterized by an elegant and refined style, his collaborations include Mina, Milva, Drupi, Mia Martini, Caterina Caselli, Dik Dik, Fiordaliso. In 1987 his song "La notte dei pensieri", written for Michele Zarrillo, won the Newcomers competition at the 37th Sanremo Music Festival.

He wrote the Italian theme songs of various anime, such as Goldrake and Captain Harlock.
