= Discografia internazionale =

- Categories: Music
- Frequency: Weekly
- Founder: Germano Ruscitto
- First issue: October 1966
- Final issue: December 1972
- Company: Billboard Publications
- Country: Italy
- Based in: Milan
- Language: Italian

Discografia internazionale (or DI) was a weekly Italian popular music magazine published from 1966. The magazine's headquarters was in Piazzale Loreto in Milan. It was run by Germano Ruscitto, formerly the press officer for Bluebell Records, in association with Billboard Publications, Inc. With its focus on international recording, the magazine was intended as a rival to the long-established Italian publication Musica e Dischi.

DI's singles chart represented Italy in Billboard's weekly "Hits of the World" international charts section. Together with Billboard and the United Kingdom's Record Retailer, Discografia Internazionale sponsored the annual International Music Industry Conference (IMIC), held in Montreux, Switzerland.

The magazine's final issue was published in December 1972.
