= Paolo Limiti =

Italian composer

Paolo Mario Limiti (8 May 1940 – 27 June 2017) was an Italian lyricist, journalist, radio and television writer and presenter.

Born in Milan, Limiti begin his career as a journalist, then in 1960 he started a long collaboration with Mike Bongiorno as author of his radio and television programs.

Active from the mid-1960s as a lyricist, his first hit was Dionne Warwick's "Silent Voices", and he then wrote songs for Mina, Claudia Mori, Mia Martini, Ornella Vanoni, Peppino di Capri, Iva Zanicchi, and Albano Carrisi, among others.

He was a successful television presenter, who mainly hosted nostalgic shows about vintage music and about the history of entertainment. He received the America Award of the Italy-USA Foundation in 2014.
