= San Paolo Converso =

Church in Milan, Italy

Coordinates: 45°27′26″N 9°11′17″E

Church of Saint Paul (Chiesa di San Paolo Converso)
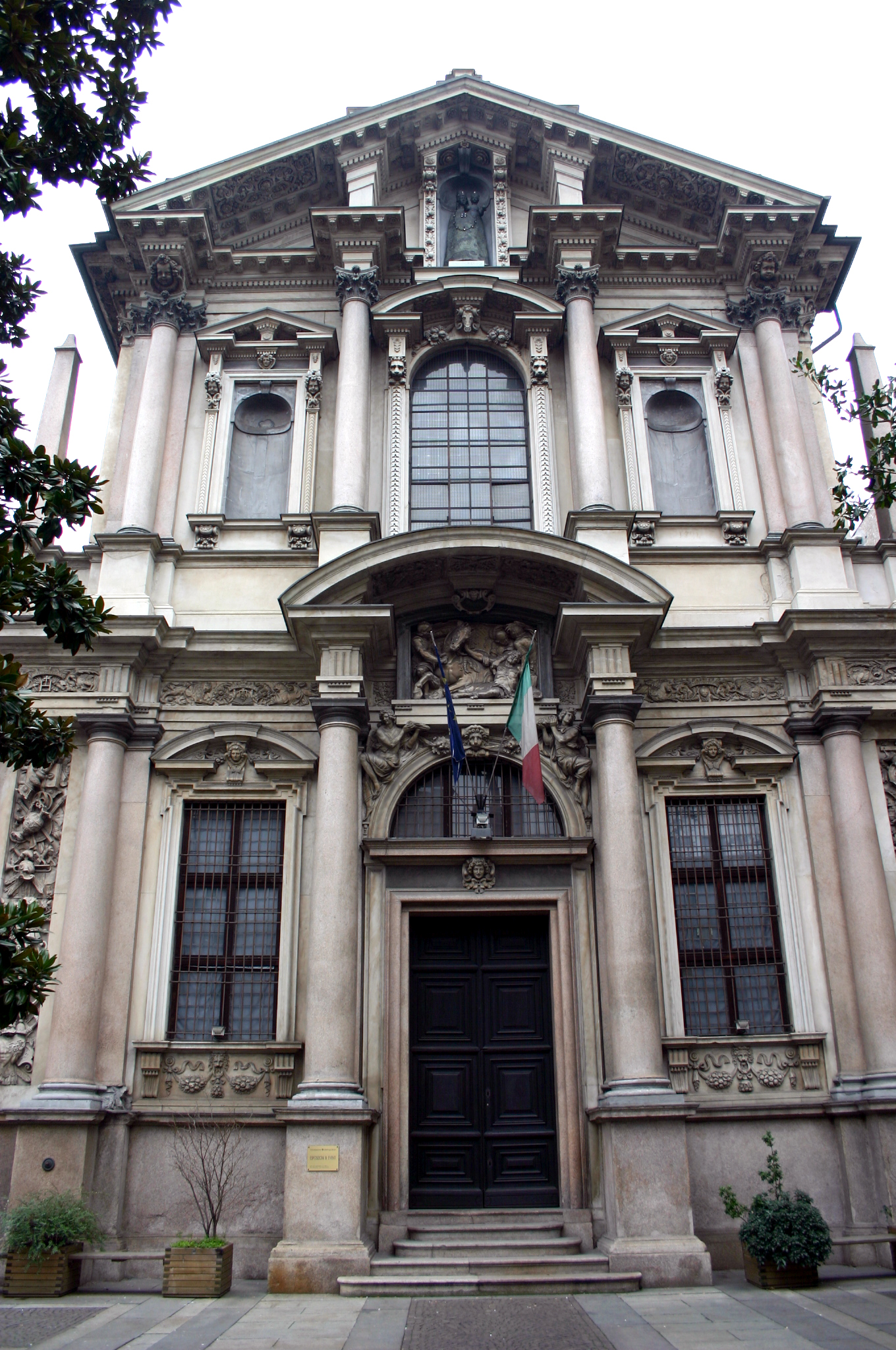
- Façade of the church.

Religion
- Affiliation: Roman Catholic
- Province: Milan
- Status: Inactive

Location
- Location: Milan, Italy
- Interactive map of Church of Saint Paul (Chiesa di San Paolo Converso)

Architecture
- Architects: Giovan Battista Crespi; Galeazzo Alessi
- Type: Church
- Style: Baroque
- Groundbreaking: 1549
- Completed: 1631

San Paolo Converso is a former Roman Catholic church in Milan, region of Lombardy, Italy, now utilized as a contemporary art space.

== History ==
The church was constructed from 1549-1580 for the convent of the Order of the Angeliche, founded by Countess Ludovica Torelli. It has a nave with barrel vault with a wall dividing the church reserved to the nuns from that for the common faithful, as in conventual churches like in San Maurizio al Monastero Maggiore.

The interior houses canvasses from the Cremonese masters Giulio, Antonio and Vincenzo Campi. The Angelicals were intended to be the female counterpart of the Barnabites and often worked with them during missions. When, in 1552 Pope Paul IV imposed the rule of cloister, Torelli separated from the religious community. With the rule of enclosure, the church was separated into two parts. The work by the Cremonese artists was likely funded by Giulia Sfondrati, of a noble and powerful Cremonese family. The Baroque façade was designed in 1613 by Giovanni Battista Crespi.

The hall of the nuns had once a Pentecost by Simone Peterzano, now in the nearby church of Sant'Eufemia. In 1808, following the suppression of the convents in the Napoleonic era, the monastery was closed, and the church subsequently de-consecrated. It was then used as a warehouse. In 1932 the space was renovated into a concert hall.

Featuring excellent acoustics, it has been used as an engraving recording room since the early 1960s for the La voce del padrone record label, which handed them over to Vittorio Buffoli and Giacomo Mazzini, Mina's father, who had just founded PDU. The renovated recording studio, operating since 1970, known as "La Basilica", will be based in the church until 1982.

The church is now privately owned. The section behind the altar previously reserved for the nuns housed an architectural office from 2014 to 2019. The non-profit Fondazione Converso manages the building as a contemporary art space, organizing exhibitions, events and performances.
