= Mina singles discography =

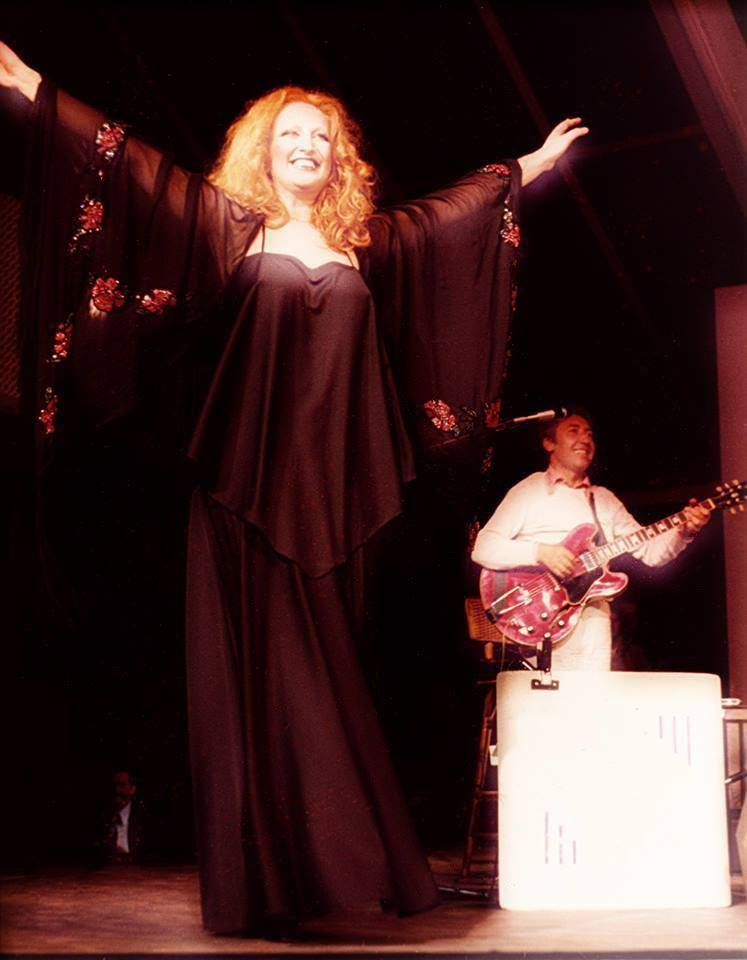
- Mina's last public performance during summer 1978
- Singles: 162
- Promotional singles: 63

Italian singer Mina has released 162 official singles and 63 promotional singles.

== Overview ==
Mina released her first single "Malatia" in 1958. Her first major success was the single "Tintarella di luna" in 1959, which became number three on the Italian chart with total sales of 200,000 copies. A number of successful singles followed. In 1960, Mina received her first number-one single "Il cielo in una stanza", which also hit the US Billboard Hot 100. In 1962, Mina with the single "Heißer Sand" hit the first positions in the charts of Austria, Germany and the Netherlands. At home in the 1960s, the singer also continued to release singles that hit the top ten. Among them are the singles: "Moliendo cafè", "È l'uomo per me" and "Un anno d'amore". In the 1970s, Mina got into the top ten with almost every new single. Such hits as "Grande, grande, grande", "Parole parole" and "E poi..." became number one. In the late 70s, Mina stopped public activities, but continued to release music. The emphasis was mainly on albums, singles still continued to be released, but did not have the same chart success. The most successful was the 1986 single "Questione di feeling", recorded with Riccardo Cocciante, it became number two on the chart. During the 1990s, Mina released only promotional singles. In 2000, Mina returned to the charts with the single "Tutti gli eroi del mondo", which debuted at number one. Subsequent singles "Succhiando l'uva", "Don't Call Me Baby (Can't Take My Eyes Off You)" and "Alibi" became number two on the chart. In April 2023, Mina released the single "Un briciolo di allegria" featuring Blanco. It debuted at number one on the Italian singles chart and stayed there for five consecutive weeks. The single also received platinum certification in Italy.

== Singles ==
=== 1950s ===
Year	Single	Peak chart positions		Sales	Album
Year	Single	ITA	BEL (WA)	Sales	Album
1958	"Malatia" b/w "Non partir"	—	—		Non-album singles
1958	"When" b/w "Be bop a lula"	—	—		Non-album singles
1959	"La febbre dell'hula hoop" b/w "Ho scritto col fuoco"	—	—		Non-album singles
1959	"Proteggimi" b/w "L'ultima preghiera"	—	—		Non-album singles
1959	"My True Love" b/w "Passion Flower"	—	—		Non-album singles
1959	"Tua" b/w "Nessuno"	—	—		Non-album singles
1959	"Io sono il vento" b/w "Tu senza di me"	—	—		Non-album singles
1959	"Amorevole" b/w "La verità"	—	—		Non-album singles
1959	"The Diary" b/w "Julia"	—	—		Non-album singles
1959	"Oui oui oui" b/w "Buon dì"	—	—		Non-album singles
1959	"Dance, Darling, Dance" b/w "Venus"	—	—		Non-album singles
1959	"Splish Splash" b/w "Give Me a Boy"	20	—		Non-album singles
1959	"T'ho vista piangere" b/w "Piangere un po'"	—	—		Non-album singles
1959	"Tintarella di luna" b/w "Mai"	3	47	ITA: 200,000	Tintarella di luna
1959	"Te vulevo scurdà" b/w "Lassame"	—	—		Non-album singles
1959	"Johnny Kiss" b/w "Aiutatemi"	—	—		Non-album singles
1959	"Whisky" b/w "La luna e il cow boy"	—	—		Tintarella di luna
1959	"Vorrei sapere perchè" b/w "My Crazy Baby"	—	—		Tintarella di luna
1959	"Folle banderuola" b/w "Un disco e tu"	18	—		Tintarella di luna
"—" denotes a recording that did not chart or was not released in that territory.

=== 1960s ===
Year	Single	Peak chart positions									Sales	Certifications	Album
Year	Single	ITA	AUT	ARG	BEL (FL)	GER	NED	SPA	USA	WW Dig.	Sales	Certifications	Album
1960	"È vero" b/w "Perdoniamoci"	4	—	—	—	—	—	—	—	—	ITA: 70,000		Tintarella di luna
1960	"Non sei felice" b/w "Invoco te"	—	—	—	—	—	—	—	—	—			Tintarella di luna
1960	"Pesci rossi" b/w "Un piccolo raggio di luna"	—	—	—	—	—	—	—	—	—			Il cielo in una stanza
1960	"Tessi tessi" b/w "Coriandoli"	7	—	—	—	—	—	—	—	—	ITA: 50,000		Non-album single
1960	"Briciole di baci" b/w "No non ha fine"	17	—	—	—	—	—	—	—	—			Il cielo in una stanza
1960	"Serafino campanaro" b/w "Making Love"	—	—	—	—	—	—	—	—	—			Il cielo in una stanza
1960	"Una zebra a pois" b/w "Mi vuoi lasciar"	18	—	—	—	—	—	—	—	—			Il cielo in una stanza
1960	"Il cielo in una stanza" b/w "La notte"	1	—	—	—	—	—	—	90	—	ITA: 500,000; World: 2,000,000	FIMI: Gold	Il cielo in una stanza
1960	"La nonna Magdalena" b/w "Gloria"	—	—	—	—	—	—	—	—	—			Il cielo in una stanza
1960	"Tutto" b/w "Sentimentale"	—	—	—	—	—	—	—	—	—			Non-album singles
1960	"Piano" b/w "Ho paura"	—	—	—	—	—	—	—	—	—			Non-album singles
1960	"Confidenziale" b/w "S'è fatto tardi"	—	—	—	—	—	—	—	—	—			Non-album singles
1960	"'Na sera 'e maggio" b/w "Celeste"	—	—	—	—	—	—	—	—	—			Non-album singles
1960	"Due note" b/w "Uno spicchio di luna" / b/w "Non voglio cioccolata"	3	—	—	—	—	—	—	—	—	ITA: 10,000		Due note
1960	"'O ffuoco" b/w "Nuie"	—	—	—	—	—	—	—	—	—			Non-album single
1961	"Io amo tu ami" b/w "Come sinfonia"	11	—	—	—	—	—	—	—	—			Due note
1961	"Le mille bolle blu" b/w "Che freddo"	5	—	—	—	—	—	6	—	—			Due note
1961	"La fine del mondo" b/w "Bum ahi (che colpo di luna)"	14	—	—	—	—	—	—	—	—			Due note
1961	"Prendi una matita" b/w "Soltanto ieri"	—	—	—	—	—	—	—	—	—			Due note
1961	"Sciummo" b/w "Tu sei mio"	—	—	—	—	—	—	—	—	—			Moliendo café
1961	"Cubetti di ghiaccio" b/w "Anata to watashi (Tu ed io)"	—	—	—	—	—	—	—	—	—			Moliendo café
1961	"Moliendo cafè" b/w "Chi sarà"	1	—	—	—	—	—	1	—	—			Moliendo café
1961	"Sabato notte" b/w "Quando c'incontriamo"	—	—	—	—	—	—	—	—	—			Renato
1961	"Summertime" b/w "Tu sei mio"	—	—	—	—	—	—	—	—	—			Moliendo café
1961	"Giochi d'ombre" b/w "Un tale"	—	—	—	—	—	—	—	—	—			Non-album single
1962	"Champagne twist" b/w "Il palloncino"	—	—	—	—	—	—	—	—	—			Moliendo café
1962	"Heißer Sand" b/w "Ein treuer Mann"	—	1	—	—	1	1	—	—	—	GER: 700,000; WW: 1,000,000		Non-album singles
1962	"Le tue mani" b/w "Il tempo"	—	—	—	—	—	—	—	—	—			Non-album singles
1962	"Renato" b/w "Eclisse twist"	4	—	—	—	—	—	—	—	—	ITA: 190,000		Renato
1962	"Chihuahua" b/w "Vola vola da me"	8	—	—	—	—	—	—	—	—			Renato
1962	"Improvvisamente" b/w "Il soldato Giò"	—	—	—	—	—	—	—	—	—			Renato
1962	"Stringimi forte i polsi" b/w "Da chi"	11	—	—	—	—	—	—	—	—			Non-album singles
1962	"Fiesta Brasiliana" b/w "Tabu"	—	8	—	19	13	—	—	—	—			Non-album singles
1962	"Il disco rotto" b/w "Si lo so"	—	—	—	—	—	—	—	—	—			Non-album singles
1963	"Just Let Me Cry" b/w "Pretend That I'm Her"	12	—	—	—	—	—	—	—	—			Non-album singles
1963	"Qué no, qué no!" b/w "Dindi"	—	—	—	—	—	—	—	—	—			Non-album singles
1963	"Capitano" b/w "Wenn du an Wunder glaubst"	—	—	—	—	17	—	—	—	—			Non-album singles
1963	"Stessa spiaggia, stesso mare" b/w "Ollallà Gigi"	4	—	—	—	—	—	—	—	—			Stessa spiaggia, stesso mare
1963	"La ragazza dell'ombrellone accanto" b/w "Mi guardano"	—	—	—	—	—	—	—	—	—			Stessa spiaggia, stesso mare
1963	"Meine Tür steht immer offen" b/w "Mister Twist"	—	—	—	—	33	—	—	—	—			Non-album singles
1963	"Vulcano" b/w "Stranger Boy"	—	—	—	—	—	—	—	—	—			Non-album singles
1963	"Bis zum nächsten Mal" b/w "Am Rio Grande"	—	—	—	—	35	—	—	—	—			Non-album singles
1963	"Città vuota" b/w "È inutile" / "Valentino vale"	3	—	—	—	—	—	—	—	8	ITA: 50,000		Studio Uno
1964	"Ja, die Liebe lebe hoch" b/w "Mein guter Stern"	—	—	—	—	28	—	—	—	—			Non-album single
1964	"A volte" b/w "Non piangerò"	—	—	—	—	—	—	—	—	—			Stessa spiaggia, stesso mare
1964	"È l'uomo per me" b/w "So che non è così"	1	—	—	—	—	—	—	—	—			Non-album single
1964	"Fremdes Land" b/w "Tausendundeine Nacht"	—	—	—	—	39	—	—	—	—			Non-album single
1964	"Un buco nella sabbia" b/w "Se mi compri un gelato"	7	—	—	—	—	—	—	—	—	JPN: 400,000		Studio Uno
1964	"Rapsodie" b/w "Amore di tabacco"	—	—	—	—	—	—	—	—	—			Non-album single
1964	"Ciudad solitaria" / "El crossfire" b/w "Se que noes así" / "Mi hombre será"	—	—	—	—	—	—	1	—	—			Non-album single
1964	"Io sono quel che sono" b/w "Tu farai"	3	—	—	—	—	—	—	—	—			Studio Uno
1964	"Yo soy la que soy" / "Un hoyo en la arena" b/w "Nadia me ama" / "Sabor a mi"	—	—	—	—	—	—	12	—	—			Non-album single
1964	"Un anno d'amore" b/w "E se domani" / b/w "Era vivere"	1	—	—	—	—	—	—	—	—		FIMI: Gold	Studio Uno
1965	"Se piangi se ridi" b/w "Più di te"	—	—	—	—	—	—	—	—	—			Studio Uno
1965	"Il cielo in una stanza" b/w "Stranger Boy"	—	—	—	—	—	—	—	—	—			Non-album singles
1965	"Young at Love" b/w "Slowly"	—	—	—	—	—	—	—	—	—			Non-album singles
1965	"Soli" b/w "Un bacio è troppo poco"	9	—	3	—	—	—	12	—	—			Non-album singles
1965	"Brava" b/w "E se domani" / b/w "Più di te"	—	—	—	—	—	—	—	—	—			Un'ora con loro
1965	"L'ultima occasione" b/w "E..."	7	—	—	—	—	—	—	—	—			Un'ora con loro
1965	"Ora o mai più" b/w "Addio"	2	—	—	—	—	—	—	—	—			Un'ora con loro
1966	"Una casa in cima al mondo" b/w "Se tu non fossi qui"	8	—	7	—	—	—	—	—	—			Studio Uno 66
1966	"Se telefonando" b/w "No"	11	—	—	—	—	—	—	—	—		FIMI: Platinum	Studio Uno 66
1966	"Breve amore" b/w "Ta-ra-ta-ta"	5	—	—	—	—	—	—	—	—			Studio Uno 66
1966	"Sono come tu mi vuoi" b/w "Se non ci fossi tu"	4	—	—	—	—	—	—	—	—			Non-album single
1966	"Mi sei scoppiato dentro il cuore" b/w "Tu non credi più"	17	—	—	—	—	—	—	—	—		FIMI: Platinum	Studio Uno 66
1967	"L'immensità" b/w "Canta ragazzina"	14	—	—	—	—	—	—	—	—			Sabato sera – Studio Uno '67
1967	"Conversazione" b/w "Sabati e domeniche"	—	—	—	—	—	—	—	—	—			Sabato sera – Studio Uno '67
1967	"La banda" b/w "Se c'è una cosa che mi fa impazzire"	2	—	—	—	—	—	—	—	—	ITA: 400,000		Sabato sera – Studio Uno '67
1967	"Tu non mi lascerai" b/w "Cartoline"	—	—	—	—	—	—	—	—	—			Sabato sera – Studio Uno '67
1967	"Trenodia" b/w "I discorsi"	—	—	—	—	—	—	—	—	—			Non-album single
1967	"I discorsi" b/w "La canzone di marinella"	—	—	—	—	—	—	—	—	—			Dedicato a mio padre
1968	"Canzone per te" b/w "Che vale per me"	—	—	—	—	—	—	—	—	—			I discorsi
1968	"Nel fondo del mio cuore" b/w "Se tornasse, caso mai"	—	—	—	—	—	—	—	—	—			4 anni di successi
1968	"Fantasia" b/w "Regolarmente"	19	—	—	—	—	—	—	—	—			Canzonissima '68
1968	"Allegria" b/w "Un colpo al cuore"	13	—	—	—	—	—	—	—	—			Mina alla Bussola dal vivo
1968	"Due note" b/w "Stringimi forte i polsi" / "Sabato notte"	—	—	—	—	—	—	—	—	—			Non-album single
1968	"Quand'ero piccola" b/w "Io innamorata"	—	—	—	—	—	—	—	—	—			Canzonissima '68
1968	"Vorrei che fosse amore" b/w "Caro"	9	—	—	—	—	—	—	—	—			Canzonissima '68
1968	"Nè come nè perchè" b/w "Niente di niente"	—	—	—	—	—	—	—	—	—			Canzonissima '68
1968	"Zum zum zum" b/w "Sacumdì sacumdà"	20	—	—	—	—	—	—	—	—			Canzonissima '68
1968	"Lunedì 26 ottobre" b/w "Non illuderti"	—	—	—	—	—	—	—	—	—			Mina 2
1969	"Un'ora fa" b/w "Ma che freddo fa"	—	—	—	—	—	—	—	—	—			Non-album single
1969	"Non credere" b/w "Dai dai domani"	3	—	—	—	—	—	27	—	—			...bugiardo più che mai... più incosciente che mai...
1969	"Si..." b/w "Moi je te regarde"	—	—	—	—	—	—	—	—	—			Non-album singles
1969	"Il cielo in una stanza" b/w "Ma se ghe penso"	—	—	—	—	—	—	—	—	—			Non-album singles
1969	"Ne la crois pas" b/w "Le coeur en larmes"	—	—	—	—	—	—	—	—	—			Non-album singles
1969	"Uno" c/w "Lontanissimo"	—	—	—	—	—	—	—	—	—			Non-album singles
1969	"Quando vedrò" b/w "Tu non mi lascerai"	—	—	—	—	—	—	—	—	—			Non-album singles
1969	"Ebb Tide" b/w "El reloj"	—	—	—	—	—	—	—	—	—			Non-album singles
1969	"Un'ombra" b/w "I problemi del cuore"	9	—	—	—	—	—	—	—	—			...bugiardo più che mai... più incosciente che mai...
1969	"Tu non credi più" b/w "Nel fondo del mio cuore"	—	—	—	—	—	—	—	—	—			Non-album single
"—" denotes a recording that did not chart or was not released in that territory.

=== 1970s ===
Year	Single	Peak chart positions		Certifications	Album
Year	Single	ITA	ARG	Certifications	Album
1970	"Bugiardo e incosciente" b/w "Una mezza dozzina di rose"	9	—		...bugiardo più che mai... più incosciente che mai...
1970	"Insieme" b/w "Viva lei"	2	—		...quando tu mi spiavi in cima a un batticuore...
1970	"No Arms Can Ever Hold You" b/w "Non Credere"	—	—		Mina for You
1970	"Glaube ihr nicht" b/w "Dai dai domani"	—	—		Non-album single
1970	"Un giorno come un altro" b/w "Il poeta"	—	—		...bugiardo più che mai... più incosciente che mai...
1970	"Non c'è che lui" b/w "La voce del silenzio"	—	—		...bugiardo più che mai... più incosciente che mai...
1970	"Ma se ghe penso" b/w "Munasterio 'e Santa Chiara"	—	—		Non-album singles
1970	"Io e te da soli" b/w "Credi"	2	—		Non-album singles
1971	"Una donna, una storia" b/w "Dominga"	9	—		...quando tu mi spiavi in cima a un batticuore...
1971	"Amor mio" b/w "Capirò (I'll Be Home)"	2	—		Mina
1971	"Uomo" b/w "La mente torna"	3	—		Non-album single
1972	"Grande, grande, grande" b/w "Non ho parlato mai"	1	—	FIMI: Gold	Mina
1972	"Parole parole" b/w "Adagio"	1	3	FIMI: Gold	Cinquemilaquarantatre
1972	"Eccomi" b/w "Domenica sera"	5	—		Del mio meglio n. 2
1973	"Lamento d'amore" b/w "Rudy"	6	—		Evergreens
1973	"E poi..." b/w "Non tornare più"	1	—		Frutta e verdura
1974	"Und dann..." b/w "Liebe am Sonntag"	—	—		Non-album singles
1974	"Non gioco più" b/w "La scala buia"	2	—		Non-album singles
1974	"Et puis ça sert à quoi" b/w "Les oiseaux reviennent"	—	—		Non-album singles
1975	"L'importante è finire" b/w "Quando mi svegliai"	2	—		La Mina
1976	"Nuda" b/w "Colpa mia"	6	—		Singolare
1977	"Giorni" c/w "Ormai"	9	—		Mina con bignè
1978	"Città vuota (It's a Lonely Town)" b/w "Ancora, ancora, ancora"	5	—	FIMI: Gold	Live '78
1978	"Città vuota" b/w "Un anno d'amore"	—	—		Non-album single
1979	"Anche un uomo" b/w "Se il mio canto sei tu"	9	—		Attila
"—" denotes a recording that did not chart or was not released in that territory.

=== 1980s ===
Year	Single	Peak chart positions	Album
Year	Single	ITA	Album
1980	"Buonanotte, buonanotte" b/w "Capisco"	9	Kyrie
1981	"Una canzone" b/w "Quando l'amore ti tocca"	21	Salomè
1982	"Morirò per te" b/w "Oggi è nero"	15	Italiana
1983	"Devi dirmi di sì" b/w "La controsamba"	7	Mina 25
1984	"Rose su rose" b/w "Ninna nanna"	16	Catene
1984	"Comincia tu" b/w "La nave" / "Brigitte Bardot"	35	Catene
1985	"Questione di feeling" (with Riccardo Cocciante) b/w "Questione di feeling" (Instrumental version)	2	Finalmente ho conosciuto il conte Dracula...
1986	"Via di qua" (with Fausto Leali) b/w "Cosa manca"	8	Sì, buana
"—" denotes a recording that did not chart or was not released in that territory.

=== 2000s ===
Year	Single	Peak chart positions	Certifications	Album
Year	Single	ITA	Certifications	Album
2000	"Tutti gli zeri del mondo" (with Renato Zero)	1		Tutti gli Zeri del mondo
2001	"Oggi sono io"	—	FIMI: Gold	Mina in Studio
2002	"Succhiando l'uva" c/w "I'll See You in My Dreams"	2		Veleno
2002	"Certe cose si fanno" c/w "Oggi sono io"	11		Veleno
2003	"Don't Call Me Baby (Can't Take My Eyes Off You)"	2		Non-album single
2003	"Reginella" c/w "Malatia"	—		Napoli primo, secondo e terzo estratto
2007	"Alibi"	2		Bau
2007	"Corazón Felino"	—		Todavía
2009	"Il frutto che vuoi"	—		Facile
"—" denotes a recording that did not chart or was not released in that territory.

=== 2010s ===
Year	Single	Peak chart positions	Album
Year	Single	ITA	Album
2010	"You Get Me" (with Seal)	33	Caramella
2011	"Questa canzone"	23	Piccolino
2014	"La palla è rotonda"	—	Selfie
2017	"All Night"	—	Non-album single
2018	"Another Day of Sun"	—	Maeba
2018	"Volevo scriverti da tanto"	76	Maeba
2018	"Il tempo di morire"	—	Paradiso (Lucio Battisti Songbook)
2019	"Vento nel vento"	—	Paradiso (Lucio Battisti Songbook)
2019	"Angeli e demoni" (with Mondo Marcio)	—	UOMO!
2019	"Tex-Mex" (with Ivano Fossati)	—	Mina Fossati
"—" denotes a recording that did not chart or was not released in that territory.

=== 2020s ===
Year	Single	Peak chart positions		Certifications	Album
Year	Single	ITA	SMR	Certifications	Album
2020	"Nel cielo dei bars"	—	—		Orione (Italian Songbook)
2020	"Un tempo piccolo"	—	—		Cassiopea (Italian Songbook)
2021	"Niente è andato perso" (as MinaCelentano)	—	—		MinaCelentano – The Complete Recordings
2022	"And I Love Her"	—	—		The Beatles Songbook
2022	"With a Little Help from My Friends"	—	—		The Beatles Songbook
2023	"Un briciolo di allegria" (with Blanco)	1	1	FIMI: 5× Platinum	Ti amo come un pazzo
2023	"Ancora, ancora, ancora" (Remix) (with Mark Ronson)	60	—		Non-album single
2023	"Povero amore" b/w "Buttare l'amore"	—	—		Ti amo come un pazzo
2024	"’O cuntrario ’e l’ammore" b/w "Sono andati?"	—	—		Napoli secondo estratto
2024	"Buttalo via"	—	—		Gassa d'amante
2025	"Settembre"	—	—		Mina Fossati (Deluxe edition)
2026	"A costo di morire"	—	—		Dilettevoli inedite eccedenze
2026	"Vento di passione"	—	—		Dilettevoli inedite eccedenze
"—" denotes a recording that did not chart or was not released in that territory.

== Promotional singles ==
Year	Single	Peak chart positions	Certifications	Album
Year	Single	ITA	Certifications	Album
1979	"Tiger Bay" c/w "Un bambino" by Freddie Aguilar	—		Attila
1982	"Mi piace tanto la gente" b/w "Sweet Transvestite"	—		Italiana
1987	"Ma chi è quello lì"	—		Rane supreme
1987	"Serpenti"	—		Rane supreme
1988	"Lui, lui, lui"	—		Ridi pagliaccio
1990	"Ma chi è, cosa fa?"	—		Ti conosco mascherina
1991	"Legata ad uno scoglio"	—		Caterpillar
1992	"Neve"	—		Sorelle Lumière
1993	"The Fool on the Hill"	—		Mina canta i Beatles
1993	"Om mani peme hum"	—		Lochness
1994	"Il leone e la gallina"	—		Mazzini canta Battisti
1994	"Rotola la vita"	—		Canarino mannaro
1994	"Amore" (with Riccardo Cocciante)	—		Canarino mannaro
1994	"Tornerai qui da me"	—		Canarino mannaro
1995	"Non c'è più audio"	—		Pappa di latte
1995	"Naufragati"	—		Pappa di latte
1995	"Metti uno zero"	—		Pappa di latte
1996	"Volami nel cuore"	—	FIMI: Gold	Cremona
1996	"Meglio così"	—		Cremona
1996	"Quanno chiove"	—		Napoli
1997	"Johnny"	—		Leggera
1997	"Resta lì"	—		Leggera
1997	"Con te sarà diverso"	—		Leggera
1997	"La canzone di Marinella" (with Fabrizio De André)	—		Mi innamoravo di tutto
1998	"Acqua e sale" (with Adriano Celentano)	88	FIMI: 2× Platinum	Mina Celentano
1998	"Brivido felino" (with Adriano Celentano)	—		Mina Celentano
1998	"Che t’aggia di'" (with Adriano Celentano)	—		Mina Celentano
1998	"Specchi riflessi" (with Adriano Celentano)	—		Mina Celentano
1998	"Sempre sempre sempre" (with Adriano Celentano)	—		Mina Celentano
1999	"Grande amore"	—		Olio
1999	"Io voglio solo te"	—		Olio
1999	"Stay with Me (Stay)"	—		Olio
1999	"Neri"	—		Mina Nº 0
2002	"Ecco il domani"	—		Veleno
2003	"Cu 'e mmane"	—		Napoli secondo estratto
2005	"Vai e vai e vai"	—		Bula Bula
2005	"Portati via"	—		Bula Bula
2005	"Dove sarai"	—		Bula Bula
2005	"Fever"	—		Bula Bula
2005	"Strangers in the Night"	—		L'allieva
2005	"My Way"	—		L'allieva
2006	"Fragile"	—		Ti amo…
2007	"Mogol Battisti"	10		Bau
2016	"Amami amami" (as MinaCelentano)	21	FIMI: Gold	Le migliori
2017	"A un passo da te" (as MinaCelentano)	—	FIMI: Platinum	Le migliori
2017	"Ma che ci faccio qui" (as MinaCelentano)	—		Le migliori
2017	"Se mi ami davvero" (as MinaCelentano)	—		Le migliori
2018	"Il tuo arredamento"	—		Maeba
2018	"Troppe note"	—		Maeba
"—" denotes a recording that did not chart or was not released in that territory.

== Other charted songs ==
Year	Single	Peak chart positions	Certifications	Album
Year	Single	ITA	Certifications	Album
1965	"Un bacio è troppo poco"	9		Non-album song
1965	"E se domani"	4		Mina
1965	"E..."	15		Un'ora con loro
1971	"La mente torna"	16		Non-album song
1972	"Fiume azzurro"	22		Cinquemilaquarantatre
1975	"Quando mi svegliai"	20		La Mina
1978	"Ancora ancora ancora"	4	FIMI: Platinum	Live '78
2008	"Poche parole" (with Giorgia)	22		Stonata / Caramella
2008	"Amiche mai" (with Ornella Vanoni)	36		Più di me
2009	"Nessun dorma"	44		Sulla tua bocca lo dirò
2009	"Adesso è facile"	31		Facile
2010	"Amoreunicoamore"	99		Caramella
2010	"Mele Kalikimaka"	14		Piccola strenna
2011	"Parole parole" (with Niccolò Fabi)	54		Non-album song
2012	"Rattarira"	95		Piccolino (Deluxe edition)
2014	"Oui c'est la vie"	91		Selfie
2014	"Troppa luce"	70		Selfie
2014	"La palla è rotonda"	77		Selfie

== See also ==
- Mina albums discography
- List of songs recorded by Mina
