= List of songs recorded by Mina =

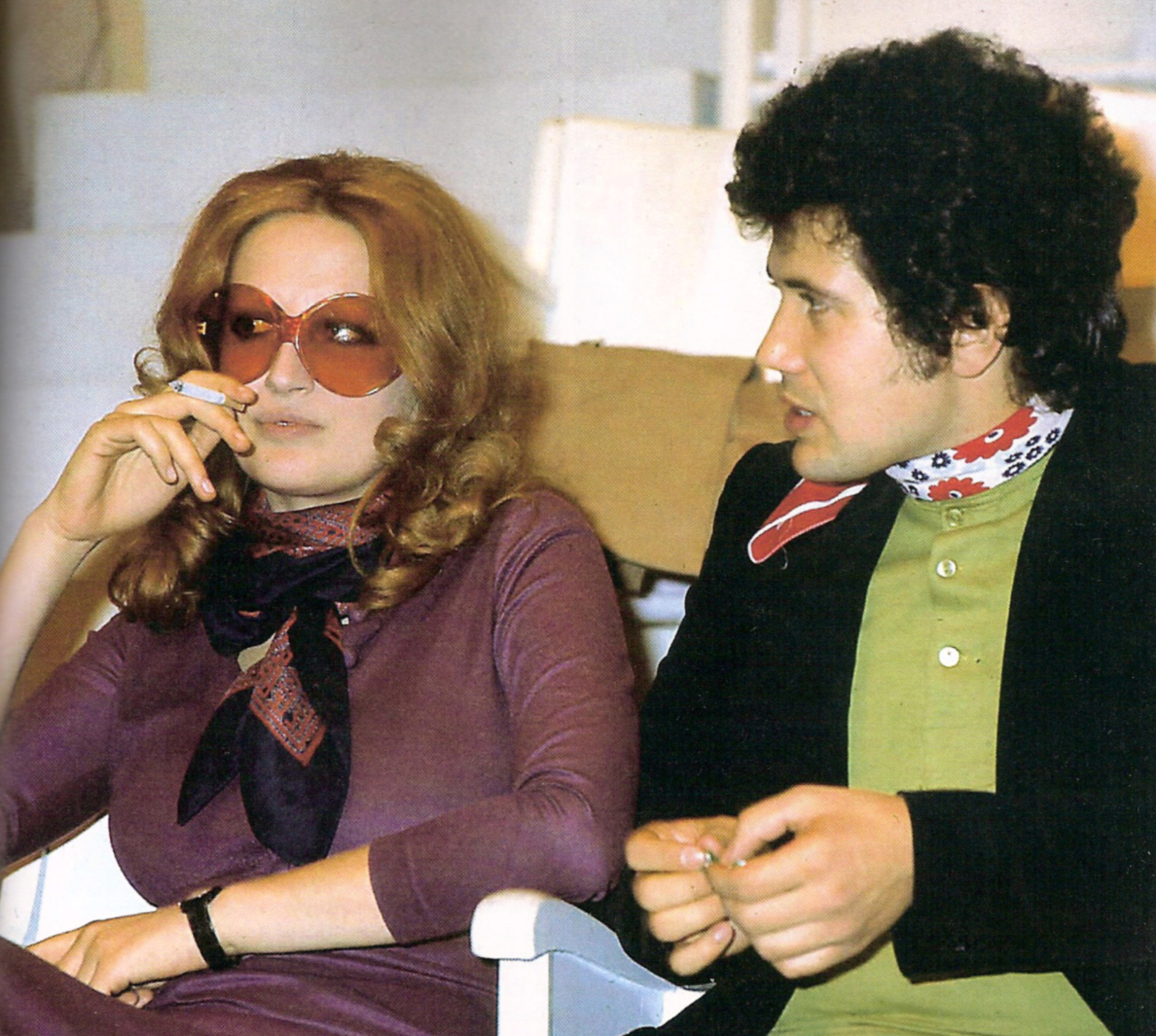
Mina and composer Lucio Battisti, who wrote for her one of her main hits "Amor mio", as well as a number of other songs in collaboration with Mogol

Below is an alphabetical list of songs recorded by Italian singer Mina in the period from 1958 to the present. During her long career, the singer has recorded over two thousand songs in Italian, Spanish, Portuguese, French, German, Neapolitan, Turkish and Japanese.

== !–9 ==
- 'A minestrina (2018)
- 'na sera 'e maggio (1960)
- 'na voce 'na chitarra (e 'o poco 'e luna) (1994)
- 'o cielo c'e manna 'sti ccose (2003)
- 'o cuntrario 'e l'ammore (2003)
- 'o ffuoco (1960)
- 'o sole mio (1968)
- ¿Cómo estás? (Come stai?) (2007)
- ¿Y que? (E poi...) (1975)
- 20 parole (2005)
- 29 settembre (1975)
- 7 e 40 (1975)

== A ==
- A banda (1970)
- A chi (Hurt) (1983)
- A cœur ouvert (Sognando)
- A Hard Day's Night (1965)
- A Night in Tunisia (1995)
- A praça (1970)
- A Rose in the Wind (2002)
- A un passo da te (2017)
- A volte (pretend that i'm her) (1964)
- Abban-dono (2023)
- Accarezzame (2022)
- Accendi questa luce (2010)
- Acqua azzurra, acqua chiara (1984)
- Acqua e sale (1998)
- Acquolina (1991)
- Adagio (1970)
- Adesso è facile (2009)
- Addio (1966)
- Adoro (1993)
- Aggio perduto 'o suonno (1996)
- Agua y sal (Acqua e sale) (2007)
- Ahi, mi' amor (Romance de Curro «El Palmo») (1983)
- Ainda Bem (2011)
- Aiutatemi (1959)
- Al cuore non comandi mai (Plus fort que nous) (1971)
- Al di là del fiume (2018)
- Alfie (1971)
- Alibi (2006)
- All the Way (2005)
- Alla fermata (2014)
- Allegria (1968)
- Allora sì (1983)
- Almeno tu nell'universo (1995)
- Amami amami (2017)
- Amami e basta (2024)
- Amado mio (1961)
- Amante amore (1977)
- Amanti (1991)
- Amanti di valore (1973)
- Amara terra mia (2001)
- Amaro è 'o bene (1996)
- Amici miei (1965)
- Amico (1999)
- Amor mio (1971)
- Amor mío (Amor mio) (1972)
- Amore (1994)
- Amore (Spanish version) (1998)
- Amore, amore, amore, amore (1968)
- Amore baciami (1983)
- Amore della domenica (2019)
- Amore disperato (2010)
- Amore di tabacco (1964)
- Amore mio (1972)
- Amore twist (1966)
- Amore, amore, amore mio (1992)
- Amoreunicoamore (2010)
- Amorevole (1959)
- Amornero (1990)
- Anata to watashi (tu ed io) (1961)
- Anche tu (1979)
- Anche un uomo (1979)
- Ancora (1986)
- Ancora, ancora, ancora (1978)
- Ancora dolcemente (1976)
- Ancora tu (1978)
- Ancora un po' (1992)
- And I Love Her (2022)
- And My Heart Cried (1969)
- Angel Eyes (1964)
- Angela (1978)
- Angeli negri (Angelitos negros) (1989)
- Angustia (1966)
- Anima nera (1992)
- Another Day of Sun (2018)
- Anytime, Anywhere (2012)
- April in Paris (2005)
- Are You Lonesome Tonight? (1989)
- Argini (2018)
- Armoniche convergenze (2011)
- Arrivederci (1968)
- As Time Goes By (1989)
- Aspettando l'alba (2014)
- Attimo per attimo (1969)
- Ave Maria (2000)
- Azzurro (1986)

== B ==
- Baby, It's Cold Outside (2013)
- Bachelite (1989)
- Bahia (1965)
- Balada para mi muerte (1972)
- Balla chi balla (Bala com bala) (1977)
- Ballando ballando (1984)
- Ballata d'autunno (Balada de Otoño) (1972)
- Bambola gonfiabile (1980)
- Banana Boat (1984)
- Banana Split for My Baby (2012)
- Bang Bang (1967)
- Barbera e champagne
- Be-bop-a-lula (1958)
- Bella senz'anima (1986)
- Bellezze in bicicletta (1983)
- Bell'animalone (2005)
- Bésame Mucho (1967)
- Bess, You Is My Woman Now (2009)
- Bewitched (1965)
- Bignè (1988)
- Billie Jean (1990)
- Bird Dog (1974)
- Black Betty (1989)
- Black Magic Woman (1992)
- Blowin' in the Wind (2000)
- Blue Moon (2005)
- Body and Soul (1993)
- Boh! (1996)
- Bonne nuit (1979)
- Boy (1981)
- Brava (1965)
- Breve amore (You Never Told Me) (1966)
- Briciole di baci (1960)
- Brigitte Bardot (1984)
- Brivido felino (1998)
- Brucio di te (2011)
- Bugiardo e incosciente (1969)
- Bum ahi! che colpo di luna (1961)
- Buona sera (1984)
- Buonanotte, buonanotte (1980)
- Buonasera dottore (1986)
- Buon dì (Alone) (1959)
- But Not for Me (1961)
- Buttalo via (2024)
- Buttare l'amore (2023)

== C ==
- C'aggio a ffà (1985)
- C'est comme un arc en ciel (Racconto) (1976)
- C'est une chanson (Una canzone) (1981)
- C'è più samba (Tem mais samba) (1968)
- C'è un uomo in mezzo al mare (1976)
- Cablo (1976)
- California (1991)
- Caminemos (1966)
- Can't Help the Way I Am (Un colpo al cuore) (1969)
- Can't Take My Eyes Off You (1970)
- Canción para ti (Canzone per te) (1968)
- Canção latina (1970)
- Canta ragazzina (1967)
- Canterò per te (1989)
- Canto (Anche se sono stonato) (1991)
- Canto de Ossanha (1970)
- Canto largo (1999)
- Canzona appassiunata (2003)
- Canzone per te (1968)
- Canzone maledetta (2011)
- Canzoni stonate (1988)
- Capirò (I'll Be Home) (1971)
- Capisco (1980)
- Cappuccetto rosso (1964)
- Caravel (1974)
- Careless Whisper (1987)
- Carlo detto il mandrillo (1973)
- Carmela (2003)
- Carne viva (2009)
- Carnevale di Venezia (1968)
- Caro (1968)
- Caro mio ben (2009)
- Caro qualcuno (1982)
- Cartoline (1967)
- Caruso (1990)
- Celeste (1960)
- Cenerentola (1964)
- Cercami (1999)
- Certe cose si fanno (2002)
- Certo su di me (1987)
- Champagne twist (1962)
- Chattanooga Choo-Choo (1983)
- Che bambola! (1983)
- Che fatica (2002)
- Che freddo (1961)
- Che lui mi dia (Basta um dia) (1977)
- Che m'è 'mparato a fà (1983)
- Che m'importa del mondo (1994)
- Che male fa (1986)
- Che meraviglia (1970)
- Che nome avrà (1989)
- Che novità (1979)
- Che t'aggia di' (1998)
- Che vale per me (1968)
- Che volgarità (1979)
- Chega de Saudade (1963)
- Chi dice non dà (Canto de Ossanha) (1968)
- Chi mai sei tu (L'unica donna) (1965)
- Chi sarà (¿Quién será?) (1961)
- Chi sarà (1962)
- Chi sarà (1980)
- Chiedimi tutto (1995)
- Chihuahua (1962)
- Chitarra suona più piano (1989)
- Chopin cha cha (1962)
- Ci vuole un po' di R'n'R (2018)
- Ciao ciao (Downtown) (1966)
- Cielito lindo (2009)
- Cigarette (1975)
- Cigarettes and Coffee (1992)
- Città vuota (It's a Lonely Town) (1965)
- Ciuri ciuri (1968)
- Clark Kent (1997)
- Colori (1980)
- Colpa mia (1976)
- Com açucar, com afeto (1969)
- Come gocce (1999)
- Come hai fatto (2001)
- Come la luna (2023)
- Come mi vuoi (1992)
- Come porti i capelli bella bionda (1972)
- Come se io fossi lì (2010)
- Come sinfonia (1961)
- Come stai? (1992)
- Come te lo devo dire (2006)
- Come te non c'è nessuno (1966)
- Come Together (1994)
- Come un diamante nascosto nella neve (2017)
- Come un uomo (Comme un homme) (1975)
- Come volano le nuvole (2019)
- Comincia tu (1984)
- Comme un homme (1975)
- Compagna di viaggio (2011)
- Con il nastro rosa (1993)
- Con o senza te (2009)
- Con te sarà diverso (1997)
- Confidenziale (1960)
- Confidenziale (1960)
- Contigo en la distancia (1981)
- Continuando (1994)
- Conversazione (1967)
- Copacabana (At the Copa) (1995)
- Corazón felino (Brivido felino) (2007)
- Corcovado (1968)
- Core 'ngrato (1996)
- Coriandoli (1960)
- Cosa manca (1986)
- Cosa penso io di te (1972)
- Così (1981)
- Così così (2010)
- Cowboys (1983)
- Crazy (1994)
- Credi (1970)
- Cry (1968)
- Cry Me a River (1992)
- Cu 'e mmane (2003)
- Cubetti di ghiaccio (1961)
- Cuestión de feeling (Questione di feeling) (2007)
- Cuore, amore, cuore (1988)

== D ==
- Da capo (1977)
- Da chi (1962)
- Da vueltas la vida (Rotola la vita) (1998)
- Dai dai domani (1969)
- Dalai (1988)
- Dance, Darling, Dance (1959)
- Das Kind ist in dem Teller (1988)
- Datemi della musica (2006)
- De acuerdo (Va bene, va bene così) (1998)
- De qué servirá (Che vale per me) (1968)
- Debo volver ya con los mios (Devo tornare a casa mia) (1975)
- Deborah (1968)
- Delta Lady (1972)
- Despacio (Adagio) (1972)
- Deux peut-être trois (Due o forse tre) (1976)
- Devi dirmi di sì (1983)
- Doce doce (1968)
- Devo dirti addio (Pra dizer adeus) (1976)
- Devo tornare a casa mia (1973)
- Di già (1975)
- Di vista (1995)
- Dichiarazione d'amore (1973)
- Dicitencelle vuje (1961)
- Die Liebe am Sonntag (Domenica sera) (1974)
- Dieci ragazzi (Dieci ragazze) (1975)
- Dindi (1963)
- Dint' 'o viento (1999)
- Dio, come ti amo! (2001)
- Gassa d'amante (2024)
- Distancias (Distanze) (1975)
- Distanze (1974)
- Dolce fuoco dell'amore (1998)
- Dolly (1998)
- Domande (1986)
- Domenica sera (1972)
- Dominga (1970)
- Domingo a la noche (1975)
- Don Salvato' (2023)
- Don't (1974)
- Don't Ask Me to Love You (Domenica sera) (1978)
- Don't Take Your Love Away (1979)
- Donna donna donna (1995)
- Doodlin' (1991)
- Dopo il cielo (1985)
- Dos o acaso tres (Due o forse tre) (1975)
- Dottore (1996)
- Dove sarai (2005)
- Dön bana (Un anno d'amore) (1966)
- Dr. Roberto (2011)
- Due note (1960)
- Due o forse tre (1974)
- Dulcis christe (2000)
- D'amore non scrivo più (2002)

== E ==
- È cosi che funziona (2024)
- E così sia (2011)
- È inutile (1963)
- È inutile (1963)
- È l'amore (2017)
- E l'era tardi (1977)
- È l'uomo per me (He Walks Like a Man) (1965)
- E la chiamano estate (1984)
- È la solita storia… (2009)
- E lucevan le stelle (2009)
- E mi manchi (1999)
- È mia (Menina) (1972)
- È Natale (1988)
- E penso a te (1971)
- E poi... (1973)
- E poi verrà l'autunno (1968)
- È proprio così, son io che canto (Hey Mister, That's Me Up on the Jukebox) (1972)
- E sapere (E savè) (1977)
- E se domani (1964)
- E sono ancora qui (1968)
- E tu come stai? (1986)
- E tu, chi sei? (1981)
- E va bene, ti voglio (1981)
- È vero (1960)
- E… (1965)
- Ebb Tide (1966)
- Eccitanti conflitti confusi (2009)
- Ecco il domani (2002)
- Ecco tutto qui (1977)
- Eccomi (1972)
- Eclisse twist (1962)
- Ein treuer Mann (1962)
- El ayer (Ieri, ieri)
- El Porompompero (1976)
- El reloj (1969)
- Eloise (1985)
- Emmanuelle (1969)
- Emozioni (1972)
- Encadenados (1995)
- Ensemble (Distanze) (1976)
- Eppur mi son scordato di te (1972)
- Estrella del rock (Rock and Roll Star) (1982)
- Era de maggio (2003)
- Era vivere (1965)
- Eravamo in tre (1963)
- Ero io, eri tu, era ieri (1970)
- Eso es el amor (1984)
- Esperame en el cielo (1981)
- Estate (1984)
- Et puis ca sert à quoi (E poi...) (1974)
- Eva (2017)
- Every Breath You Take (1995)
- Everything Happens to Me (1964)

== F ==
- Fa' qualcosa (1973)
- Fai la tua vita (2006)
- Fantasia (Fantasy) (1968)
- Farfalle (2019)
- Fascinating Rhythm (1961)
- Fate piano (1972)
- Fermerò qualcuno (1980)
- Fermi (1991)
- Fermoposta (1999)
- Fever (2005)
- Fiesta Brasiliana (1962)
- Figlio unico (Trem das Onze) (1992)
- Fine (2014)
- Finisce qui (1968)
- Fino a domani (2023)
- Fiore amaro (1979)
- Fiori rosa, fiori di pesco (1975)
- Fire and Rain (2012)
- Fiume azzurro (1972)
- Flamenco (1991)
- Flamingo (1974)
- Fly Away (2011)
- Fly Me to the Moon (In Other Words) (1972)
- Folle banderuola (1959)
- Fortissimo (1990)
- Fosse vero (1994)
- Fra mille anni (2005)
- Fragile (2005)
- Franz (1990)
- Frida (1968)
- Fuliggine (1992)
- Full Moon and Empty Arms (1966)
- Fuori città (2011)

== G ==
- Galeotto fu il canotto (1999)
- Ganimede (1990)
- Gente (People) (1967)
- Georgia on My Mind (1978)
- Già visto (1982)
- Gimme a Little Sign (1968)
- Giochi d'ombre (1961)
- Giorni (1977)
- Giuro di dirti la verità (1983)
- Give Me a Boy (1959)
- Glaube ihr nicht (1970)
- Gloria (1960)
- Gone with the Wind (2000)
- Good Evening Friends (1976)
- Goodbye (2005)
- Grande amor (Grande amore) (2007)
- Grande amore (1999)
- Grande, grande, grande (1971)
- Grande, grande, grande (Spanish version) (1972)
- Grease (1986)
- Grigio (1997)
- Guapparia (2003)

== H ==
- Ha tanti cieli la luna (1999)
- Hai vinto tu (2002)
- Have Yourself a Merry Little Christmas (2012)
- He Will Call Again (1970)
- Heartbreak Hotel (2018)
- Heißer Sand (1962)
- Hey Jude (1984)
- Hymne à l'amour (1967)
- Ho paura (1960)
- Ho scritto col fuoco (1959)
- Ho un sassolino nella scarpa (1983)
- How Deep Is Your Love (1985)
- How Lovely Is Christmas (2013)
- Hoy (Noi) (1998)

== I ==
- I discorsi (1969)
- I discorsi (English version) (2011)
- I giardini di marzo (1975)
- I giorni dei falò (Long Ago and Far Away) (1972)
- I Got Rhythm (1961)
- I Have a Love (2009)
- I Know (1980)
- I Left My Heart in San Francisco (1988)
- I Loves You, Porgy (2009)
- I migliori anni della nostra vita (1999)
- I Only Have Eyes for You (1974)
- I problemi del cuore (1969)
- I ricordi della sera (È scesa malinconica la sera) (1992)
- I Should Care (1967)
- I Should Have Known Better (1965)
- I sogni di un semplice (1973)
- I Still Love You (Fate piano) (1974)
- I Want to Be Free (1990)
- I Want to Be Loved (But Only by You) (1969)
- I Won't Cry Anymore (1969)
- I' te vurria vasa'!… (2003)
- I'll Be Home for Christmas (2013)
- I'll Be Seeing You (2012)
- I'll Fly for You (1992)
- I'll Never Be Free (1969)
- I'll See You in My Dreams (2002)
- I'm a Fool to Care (1991)
- I'm a Fool to Want You (1966)
- I'm Glad There Is You (1966)
- I'm in the Mood for Love (1974)
- I've Got You Under My Skin (2012)
- Ideale (2009)
- Ieri, ieri (1973)
- If I Fell (1995)
- If You Leave Me Now (1985)
- Il cielo (1999)
- Il cielo in una stanza (1960)
- Il cigno dell'amore (1982)
- Il corvo (1991)
- Il cuore si sbaglia (2024)
- Il disco rotto (1962)
- Il frutto che vuoi (2009)
- Il genio del bene (1991)
- Il giocattolo (2014)
- Il leone e la gallina (1994)
- Il meccanismo (1999)
- Il mio amore disperato (2018)
- Il mio nemico è ieri (1970)
- Il mondo è grigio il mondo è blu (Le monde est gris le monde est bleu) (1968)
- Il nostro caro angelo (1975)
- Il palloncino (1962)
- Il pazzo (2002)
- Il pelo nell'uovo (2014)
- Il plaid (1989)
- Il poeta (1969)
- Il poeta che non pensa mai (1973)
- Il portiere di notte (1988)
- Il posto mio (1994)
- Il povero e il re (2010)
- Il Riccardo (1972)
- Il segnale (Kiss the Sky) (2022)
- Il soldato Giò (1962)
- Il sogno di Giacomo (2010)
- Il tempo (1962)
- Il tempo di morire (1972)
- Il testamento del capitano (1976)
- Il tuo arredamento (2018)
- Il vento (1979)
- Ill Wind (2002)
- Immagina un concerto (1975)
- Impagliatori d'aquile (1994)
- Improvvisamente (1962)
- In autostrada (1985)
- In onda (1994)
- In percentuale (2002)
- In the Mood (1968)
- In vista della sera (1990)
- Indifferentemente (1996)
- Inevitabile (2006)
- Inibizioni al vento (1973)
- Innocenti evasioni (1975)
- Insensatez (1964)
- Insieme (1970)
- Into the Groove (1988)
- Inutile sperare (2010)
- Invitation (1966)
- Invoco te (1960)
- Io amo tu ami (1961)
- Io camminerò (1976)
- Io che amo solo te (1968)
- Io che non vivo (1965)
- Io e te (2010)
- Io e te da soli (1970)
- Io ho te (1998)
- Io innamorata (1968)
- Io innamorata (English version)
- Io non sono lei (2014)
- Io non volevo (1998)
- Io per lui (To Give the Reason I Live) (1968)
- Io sarò con te (1996)
- Io sono il vento (1959)
- Io sono quel che sono (1965)
- Io ti amavo quando (You've Got a Friend) (1972)
- Io tra di voi (Et moi dans mon coin) (1970)
- Io vivrò senza te (1971)
- Io voglio solo te (1999)
- Io vorrei… non vorrei… ma se vuoi… (1989)
- Io, domani (1986)
- It Came Upon a Midnight Clear (2013)
- It's Impossible (Somos novios) (1988)
- It's Only Make Believe (1974)
- It's Your Move (1982)

== J ==
- Je so' pazzo (1994)
- Je sto vicino a te (1996)
- Jezebel (1968)
- Jingle Bell Rock (2013)
- Joana Francesa (1993)
- Johnny (1997)
- Johnny B. Goode (1989)
- Johnny Guitar (1967)
- Johnny Kiss (1959)
- Johnny scarpe gialle (2006)
- Julia (1959)
- Juntos (Insieme) (1972)
- Just a Gigolo (2012)
- Just let me cry (1963)
- Just the Way You Are (1985)

== K ==
- Killing Me Softly with His Song (1985)

== L ==
- L'abitudine (Daddy's Dream) (1972)
- L'altra metà di me (1986)
- L'amore è bestia, l'amore è poeta (1980)
- L'amore è un'altra cosa (1974)
- L'amore ha i tuoi occhi (1965)
- L'amore vero (2024)
- L'amore viene e se ne va (2006)
- L'amore, forse… (Ao amigo Tom) (1972)
- L'amour est mort (Io e te da soli) (1972)
- L'aquila (1975)
- L'immensità (1967)
- L'importante è finire (1975)
- L'indifferenza (1991)
- L'infinito di stelle (2019)
- L'irriducibile (1993)
- L'orto (2023)
- L'ultima occasione (1965)
- L'uomo dell'autunno (2011)
- L'uomo perfetto (2019)
- L'ultima preghiera (1959)
- L'ultima volta (1976)
- L'ultimo gesto di un clown (1988)
- L'uomo della sabbia (1970)
- L'uva fogarina (Teresina Imbriaguna) (1972)
- La bacchetta magica (1996)
- La ballata del Cerutti (1972)
- La banda (A banda) (1967)
- La barca (1964)
- La bella Gigogin (1968)
- La canzone del sole (1994)
- La canzone di Marinella (1967)
- La casa del nord (1984)
- La casa del serpente (1991)
- La chiromancienne (Caravel) (1975)
- La clessidra (2010)
- La compagnia (1988)
- La controsamba (1983)
- La danza (1968)
- La donna riccia (2001)
- La febbre dell'hula hoop (1959)
- La fin des vacances (2005)
- La fine del mondo (1960)
- La follia (1992)
- La fretta nel vestito (2005)
- La gabbia (2023)
- La guerra fredda (2019)
- La lontananza (2001)
- La luna e il cowboy (1959)
- La mente cambia (La mente torna) (1972)
- La mente torna (1971)
- La mia carrozza (1972)
- La mia vecchiaia (1973)
- La monferrina (1968)
- La montagna (1989)
- La musica è finita (1968)
- La nave (1984)
- La nonna Magdalena (1960)
- La notte (1960)
- La notte (La nuit) (1993)
- La palla è rotonda (2014)
- La partita di pallone (1966)
- La pelle nera (1989)
- La pioggia di marzo (Águas de Março) (1973)
- La ragazza dell'ombrellone accanto (1963)
- La ragazza di Ipanema (1968)
- La scala buia (1975)
- La seconda da sinistra (2002)
- La sera che partì mio padre (1977)
- La sola ballerina che tu avrai (2014)
- La solita storia d'amore (1973)
- La tua voce dentro l'anima (1977)
- La verità (1959)
- La verità (1984)
- La vida gota a gota (La vita goccia a goccia) (1975)
- La vie (Credi) (1972)
- La vigilia di natale (1973)
- La vita goccia a goccia (1973)
- La vita vuota (1982)
- La voce del silenzio (1968)
- Lacreme e voce (1999)
- Lacreme napulitane (1978)
- Lacrime e voce (1999)
- Ladro (2019)
- Laia ladaia (1972)
- Lamento d'amore (1973)
- Lariulà (1965)
- Lascia (2023)
- Lassame (1959)
- Last Christmas (2018)
- Laura (2005)
- Lazy River (1967)
- Le cinque della sera (1960)
- Le cœur en larmes (Un colpo al cuore) (1969)
- Le colline sono in fiore (1965)
- Le farfalle nella notte (1971)
- Le mani sui fianchi (1972)
- Le mille bolle blu (1961)
- Le tue mani (1962)
- Legata ad uno scoglio (1991)
- Legittime curiosità (1987)
- Les cornichons (1989)
- Les mauvais jours (Ancora dolcemente) (2011)
- Les oiseaux reviennent (Non tornare più) (1974)
- Let It Be (1993)
- Let It Snow! (2013)
- Liebe am sonntag (1974)
- Liza (1981)
- Llévate ahora (Portati via) (2007)
- Lo farei (1990)
- Lo faresti (1989)
- Lo se (Fosse vero) (1998)
- Lo shampoo (1991)
- Los problemas del corazón (I problemi del cuore) (1972)
- Lontanissimo (Somewhere) (1966)
- Love Me (1993)
- Love Me (Uappa) (1978)
- Love Me Tender (1991)
- Love Me, Please Love Me (1991)
- Lullaby of Birdland (1968)
- Lui, lui, lui (1988)
- Lumière (Nuur) (1976)
- Luna diamante (2019)
- Luna lunera (1987)
- Lunarità (1991)
- Lunedì 26 ottobre (1968)

== M ==
- Ma che bontà (1977)
- Ma che ci faccio qui (2017)
- Ma che freddo fa (1969)
- Ma chi è, cosa fa? (Partido alto) (1990)
- Ma chi è quello lì (1987)
- Ma c'è tempo (2009)
- Ma ci pensi (1979)
- Ma comme faje (2010)
- Ma è soltanto amore (1969)
- Ma l'amore no (1968)
- Ma le gambe (1968)
- Ma se ghe penso (1967)
- Ma tu ci pensi (1996)
- Ma tu mi ami ancora? (2009)
- Magia (1983)
- Magica follia (1982)
- Magnificat (2000)
- Mai (1959)
- Mai cosi (1966)
- Mai prima (1974)
- Mai visti due (2014)
- Makin' love (1960)
- Malafemmena (1990)
- Malatia (1958)
- Mandalo giù — l'elisir tirati su (1967)
- Manon (Preludio al terzo atto di «Manon Lescaut») (2009)
- Mappamondo (1987)
- Matrioska (2011)
- Meraviglioso, è tutto qui (2019)
- Margherita (1978)
- Maria mari'!… (2003)
- Marrakesh (Qualquer coisa) (1982)
- Maruzzella (1996)
- Me siento libre (La scala buia) (1975)
- Meglio così (1996)
- Meglio sarebbe (1972)
- Mele Kalikimaka (2010)
- Mellow Yellow (1968)
- Merry Christmas in Love (2022)
- Memorare (2000)
- Mente (2002)
- Messaggio d'amore (1998)
- Metti uno zero (1995)
- Mi chiamano Mimì (2009)
- Mi fai sentire cosi strana (1971)
- Mi guardano (1963)
- Mi guardano (1970)
- Mi manchi tu (1987)
- Mi mandi rose (Todo prosa) (1985)
- Mi parlavi adagio (2009)
- Mi piace tanto la gente (1982)
- Mi piacerebbe andare al mare (2010)
- Mi ritorni in mente (1972)
- Mi sei scoppiato dentro il cuore (1966)
- Mi sono innamorata di te (1968)
- Mi vendo (1999)
- Mi vuoi lasciar (1960)
- Michelle (1976)
- Miele su miele (1981)
- Mille motivi (1993)
- Mio di chi (1985)
- Misty (1983)
- Mogol Battisti (2006)
- Moi je te regarde (Io innamorata) (1969)
- Moliendo cafè (1961)
- Momento magico (1984)
- Mood Indigo (1976)
- Moody's Mood (1988)
- Moonlight Serenade (1976)
- More Than Strangers (Vorrei che fosse amore) (1969)
- More Than Words (1995)
- Morirò per te (1982)
- Motherless Child (1972)
- Mr. Blue (1974)
- Munasterio 'e Santa Chiara (1961)
- Musica (1980)
- Musica d'Argentina (1982)
- Musica per lui (1996)
- My Cherie Amour (1987)
- My Crazy Baby (1959)
- My Love (1976)
- My Melancholy Baby (1966)
- My Sharona (1985)
- My True Love (1959)
- My Way (2005)

== N ==
- Nada te turbe (2000)
- Napule è (2003)
- Napule ca se ne va (1961)
- Nature Boy (1983)
- Naufragati (1995)
- Nè come nè perchè (1968)
- Ne la crois pas (Non credere) (1969)
- Nei miei occhi (1985)
- Nel blu, dipinto di blu (Volare) (2001)
- Nel cielo dei bars (2020)
- Nel fondo del mio cuore (1967)
- Nem vem que nao tem (1970)
- Neri (1999)
- Nessun altro mai (2006)
- Nessun dolore (1987)
- Nessun dorma (2009)
- Nessuno (1959)
- Nessuno al mondo (No Arms Can Ever Hold You) (1970)
- Neve (1992)
- Never Never Never (1977)
- Nient'altro che felici (1990)
- Niente di niente (Break Your Promise) (1968)
- Niente è andato perso (2021)
- Niente meglio di noi due
- Nieve (Neve) (2007)
- Night Wind Sent (2002)
- Ninguém me ama (1964)
- Ninna nanna (1984)
- Ninna nanna amore stanco (1973)
- Ninna pà (1993)
- No (1966)
- No (1981)
- No Arms Can Ever Hold You (1968)
- No juego más (Non gioco più) (1975)
- No lo creas (Non credere) (1972)
- No sé si eres tú (Sei o non sei) (2007)
- No, non ha fine (1960)
- Noi (1994)
- Noi due (1967)
- Noi due nel mondo e nell'anima (1988)
- Noi soli insieme (1997)
- Non arrenderti mai, uomo (Keep Your Hand on That Plow) (1972)
- Non avere te (1992)
- Non c'è che lui (1969)
- Non c'è più audio (1995)
- Non ci sono emozioni (1990)
- Non credere (1969)
- Non è Francesca (1975)
- Non è niente (1994)
- Non gioco più (1975)
- Non ho difese (1983)
- Non ho parlato mai (1971)
- Non ho più bisogno di te (2023)
- Non illuderti (1964)
- Non mi ami (2017)
- Non partir (1959)
- Non passa (1999)
- Non piangerò (just let me cry) (1964)
- Non può morire un'idea (1978)
- Non sei felice (1960)
- Non si butta via niente (2009)
- Non si può morire in eterno (1997)
- Non smetto di aspettarti (2024)
- Non so (1974)
- Non so dir (ti voglio bene) (1993)
- Non ti lascerò (2024)
- Non ti riconosco più (1972)
- Non ti scordar di me (1968)
- Non ti voglio più (2009)
- Non tornare più (1973)
- Non tornerò (1979)
- Non voglio cioccolata (1960)
- Nostalgias (1993)
- Notte di luna calante (2001)
- Notte di san Valentino (1990)
- Notturno delle tre (2002)
- Nuages (1993)
- Nuda (1976)
- Nuie (1960)
- Nun è peccato (1996)
- Nuur (1974)
- Nuur (Spanish version) (2011)

== O ==
- O qué será (1982)
- Oblivion (Una sombra más) (2009)
- Oggi è nero (1982)
- Oggi sono io (2002)
- Ogni tanto è bello stare soli (1986)
- Oh! Darling (1989)
- Oh Happy Day (1965)
- Oh, Lady Be Good (1961)
- Old Fashion Christmas (2013)
- Ollallà Gigi (1963)
- Om mani peme hum (1993)
- Omni die (2000)
- Once I Loved (O amor em paz) (2005)
- One for My Baby (and One More for the Road) (2005)
- Only the Lonely (2005)
- Only This Song (2011)
- Only You (1983)
- Ora o mai più (1965)
- Ormai (1977)
- Oro (1994)
- Oroscopo (1977)
- Ossessione '70 (1972)
- Oui c'est la vie (2014)
- Oui, oui, oui, oui (1959)
- Oye Cómo Va (1992)
- Over the Rainbow (2012)

== P ==
- Parlami d'amore Mariù (1993)
- Parole parole (1972)
- Parole parole (2007)
- Pasqualino marajà (2001)
- Passion Flower (1959)
- Passione (1996)
- Pel di carota (1966)
- Pennsylvania 6-5000 (1976)
- Penombra (1974)
- Penso positivo (1995)
- Per avere te (1987)
- Per averti qui (1982)
- Per di più (1984)
- Per dirti t'amo (2024)
- Per poco che sia (2006)
- Per ricominciare (Can't Take My Eyes Off You) (1968)
- Per te che mi hai chiesto una canzone (1995)
- Per una volta tanto (1990)
- Perchè no (1994)
- Perdimi (2014)
- Perdoniamoci (1960)
- Perfetto non so (1982)
- Personalità (1960)
- Pesci rossi (1960)
- Piangere un po' (1959)
- Piano (1960)
- Pianto della Madonna (2000)
- Più del tartufo sulle uova (2009)
- Più di cosi (1984)
- Più di te (1965)
- Poche parole (2010)
- Pomeriggio sonnolento (1986)
- Porque tu me acostumbraste (1995)
- Portami con te (1967)
- Portati via (2005)
- Poster (1985)
- Pour en finir comment faire (L'importante è finire) (1975)
- Povero amore (2023)
- Prendi una matita (1961)
- Pretend that i'm her (1963)
- Prisencolinensinainciusol (2017)
- Profumi, balocchi e maritozzi (1999)
- Proprio come sei (1987)
- Proteggimi (1959)
- Puro teatro (1998)

== Q ==
- Qualcosa in più (1980)
- Quand'ero piccola (1968)
- Quand'ero piccola (English version) (2011)
- Quand l'amour vous touche (Quando l'amore ti tocca) (1981)
- Quando c'incontriamo (1961)
- Quando corpus morietur (2000)
- Quando dico che ti amo (1967)
- Quando finisce una canzone (1992)
- Quando l'amore ti tocca (1981)
- Quando la smetterò (2017)
- Quando mi dici così (1968)
- Quando mi svegliai (1975)
- Quando vedrò (1967)
- Quanno chiove (1996)
- Quanno nascette Ninno (2000)
- Quasi come musica (A Song for You) (1975)
- Quatt'ore 'e tiempo (Aria di chiesa di Alessandro Stradella) (1980)
- Que maravilha (1970)
- Que no que no (1963)
- Que nos separemos (Io e te da soli) (1972)
- Quel motivetto che mi piace tanto (1965)
- Quella briciola di più (2005)
- Quelli che hanno un cuore (Anyone Who Had a Heart) (1968)
- Questa canzone (2011)
- Questa cosa chiamata amore (1970)
- Questa vita loca (Vida loca) (2009)
- Questione di feeling (1985)
- Questa donna insopportabile (2014)
- Questo piccolo grande amore (1986)
- Questo si, questo no (1973)
- Qui presso a te (2000)

== R ==
- Racconto (C'est comme l'arc en ciel) (1975)
- Radio (1980)
- Rapsodie (1964)
- Raso (1993)
- Rattarira (2011)
- Reginella (2002)
- Reggio Emilia (1972)
- Regolarmente (1968)
- Renato (1962)
- Resta cu'mme (2001)
- Resta lì (1997)
- Ricominciamo (1996)
- Ride Like the Wind (2000)
- Ridi pagliaccio (1988)
- Rien que vous (Solo lui)
- Rimani qui (1988)
- Rino (1977)
- Ritratto in bianco e nero (Retrato em branco e preto) (1986)
- Robinson (1992)
- Rock and Roll Star (1979)
- Roma, nun fa la stupida stasera (1968)
- Rose su rose (1984)
- Rossetto sul colletto (Lipstick on Your Collar) (1960)
- Rosso (1994)
- Rotola la vita (1994)
- Rudy (1972)
- Runaway (E poi...) (1974)

== S ==
- S'è fatto tardi (1960)
- Sabati e domeniche (1967)
- Sabato notte (1962)
- Sabor a mí (1964)
- Sacumdì, sacumdà (Nem vem que não tem) (1968)
- Santa Claus Got Stuck in My Chimney (2013)
- Sapori di civiltà (1982)
- Sarà per te (1989)
- Saxophone (1977)
- Scettico blues (1976)
- Sciummo (1961)
- Scrivimi (1987)
- Se (2005)
- Se avessi tempo (1993)
- Se c'è una cosa che mi fa impazzire (1967)
- Se finisse tutto così (1995)
- Se il mio canto sei tu (1979)
- Se mi ami davvero (2017)
- Se mi compri un gelato (1964)
- Se non ci fossi tu (1966)
- Se piangi, se ridi (1965)
- Se poi (1992)
- Se stasera sono qui (1968)
- Se telefonando (1966)
- Se tornasse caso mai (If He Walked Into My Life) (1967)
- Sei tu, sei tu (1968)
- Se tu non fossi qui (1966)
- Secondo me (1986)
- Sei metà (1979)
- Sei o non sei (2005)
- Semplicemente tua (1986)
- Sempre sempre sempre (1998)
- Señora melancolía (1977)
- Sensazioni (1979)
- Sentado à Beira do Caminho (1970)
- Sentimental Journey (1967)
- Sentimentale (1960)
- Sentimentale (1971)
- Senza farmi male (2024)
- Senza fiato (1982)
- Senza umanità (1985)
- September Song (2012)
- Serafino campanaro (1960)
- Serpenti (1987)
- Sette uomini d'oro (1967)
- Settembre (2019)
- Sfiorisci bel fiore (1977)
- Shadow Of My Old Road (1979)
- She Loves You (1965)
- She's Leaving Home (1980)
- Si... (Vorrei che fosse amore) (1969)
- Si che non sei tu (1993)
- Si lo so (1962)
- Si, l'amore (1993)
- Sì, viaggiare (1978)
- Signora più che mai (1975)
- Silent Night (Stille Nacht, heilige Nacht) (2010)
- Silenzioso slow (Abbassa la tua radio per favor) (1969)
- Sin Piedad (2007)
- Sincerely (1995)
- Slowly (1962)
- So (1967)
- So che mi vuoi (It's for You) (1965)
- So che non è così (1964)
- Sognando (1976)
- Sogno (Sonhos) (1984)
- Soli (1965)
- Solo se sai rispondere (2010)
- Solo lui (1974)
- Solo un attimo (2002)
- Soltanto ieri (1961)
- Someday (You'll Want Me to Want You) (1972)
- Someday in My Life (1997)
- Someone to Watch Over Me (1961)
- Something (1971)
- Somos (1967)
- Somos novios (1998)
- Sono andati? (2009)
- Sono come tu mi vuoi (1966)
- Sono le tre (2017)
- Sono qui per te (1966)
- Sono sola sempre (1981)
- Sono stanco (1990)
- Sophisticated Lady (1983)
- Sorry Seems to Be the Hardest Word (1987)
- Sotto il sole dell'Avana (1986)
- Sotto l'ombrellino (1968)
- Spaghetti, insalatina e una tazzina di caffè a Detroit (1968)
- Spara (1985)
- Specchi riflessi (1998)
- Splish Splash (1959)
- Squarciagola (1981)
- Stai così (1997)
- Stardust (1991)
- Stars Fell on Alabama (1964)
- Stasera con te (1966)
- Stasera io qui (1978)
- Stay with Me (Stay) (1999)
- Stayin' Alive (1978)
- Stella by Starlight (1964)
- St. Louis Blues (1967)
- Stessa spiaggia, stesso mare (1963)
- Stile libero (1993)
- Strada 'nfosa (2001)
- Stranger Boy (1963)
- Strangers in the Night (1984)
- Street Angel (1979)
- Stringimi forte i polsi (1962)
- Succede (1996)
- Succhiando l'uva (2002)
- Sulamente pè parlà (1995)
- Sull'Orient Express (2006)
- Summertime (1962)
- Suona ancora (1997)
- Suoneranno le sei (Balada para mi muerte) (1972)
- Sweet Transvestite (1982)

== T ==
- T'ho vista piangere (1959)
- T.I.R. (1989)
- Ta-ra-ta-ta (1966)
- Tabu (1962)
- Take Me (L'importante è finire) (1978)
- También tú (Anche tu) (1982)
- Te voglio bene assaje (1968)
- Te vulevo scurdà (1959)
- Tem mais samba (1970)
- Tentiamo ancora (1973)
- Teorema (1993)
- Terre lontane (1976)
- Tessi tessi (1960)
- Tex-Mex (2019)
- That Old Feeling (1967)
- That's When Your Heartaches Begin (1974)
- The Beat Goes On (1968)
- The Captain of Her Heart (1995)
- The Diary (1959)
- The End (2006)
- The Fool on the Hill (1993)
- The Long and Winding Road (1993)
- The Man I Love (1961)
- The Man That Got Away (1967)
- The Nearness of You (1964)
- The Secret of Christmas (2013)
- The Shadow of Your Smile (1968)
- The Way I Love You (Amore mio) (1978)
- The Wind Cries Mary (2000)
- The World We Love In (Il cielo in una stanza) (1960)
- These Foolish Things (Remind Me of You) (2005)
- They Can't Take That Away from Me (1995)
- This Masquerade (1988)
- Ti accetto come sei (1975)
- Ti accompagnerò (1993)
- Ti dimentichi di maria (1982)
- Ti lascio amore (2017)
- Ti meriti l'inferno (2018)
- Tiger Bay (1979)
- Timida (1995)
- Tintarella di luna (1959)
- Tira a campà (1977)
- To Be Loved (1974)
- Too Close for Comfort (2023)
- Todas as mulheres do mundo (1970)
- Todo pasará, verás (Tutto passerà vedrai) (1975)
- Tonight (1967)
- Torna a Surriento (1961)
- Tornerai qui da me (1994)
- Torno venerdi (1995)
- Tra Napoli e un bicchiere (1980)
- Tradirò (1977)
- Traditore (1991)
- Trani a go-go (1972)
- Trasparenze (1974)
- Tre volte dentro me (1997)
- Tre volte sì (1989)
- Trenodia (1967)
- Tres palabras (1981)
- Triste (1976)
- Tristeza (1968)
- Troppa luce (2014)
- Troppe note (2018)
- Tu ca nun chiagne! (2003)
- Tu con me (1987)
- Tu dimmi che città (1994)
- Tu farai (1965)
- Tu musica divina (1973)
- Tu no (1975)
- Tu non credi più (1966)
- Tu non mi lascerai (1967)
- Tu sarai la mia voce (Put the Weight on My Shoulders) (1981)
- Tu sei mio (1961)
- Tu senza di me (1959)
- Tu sì 'na cosa grande (2001)
- Tu vuoi lei (1987)
- Tua (1959)
- Tutto (1960)
- Tutto passerà vedrai (1974)
- Tutto quello che un uomo (2023)

== U ==
- Uappa (1975)
- Uh uh (1981)
- Un anno d'amore (C'est irreparable) (1965)
- Un año de amor (Un anno d'amore [C'est irréparable]) (2007)
- Un bacio è troppo poco (1965)
- Un briciolo di allegria (2023)
- Un buco nella sabbia (1965)
- Un colpo al cuore (1968)
- Un cucchiaino di zucchero nel thè (1986)
- Un disco e tu (1959)
- Un giorno come un altro (1969)
- Un nuovo amico (1992)
- Un piccolo raggio di luna (1960)
- Un pò d'uva (1973)
- Un pò di più (1979)
- Un soffio (2018)
- Un tale (1961)
- Un tipo indipendente (1988)
- Un uomo che mi ama (2006)
- Un'aquila nel cuore (1983)
- Un'estate fa (Une belle histoire) (1990)
- Un'ombra (1969)
- Un'ora (1988)
- Un'ora fa (1969)
- Una canzone (1981)
- Una casa in cima al mondo (1966)
- Una donna, una storia (1970)
- Una lunga storia d'amore (1989)
- Una mezza dozzina di rose (1969)
- Una musica va (1974)
- Una ragazza in due (Down Came the Rain) (1977)
- Una zebra a pois (1960)
- Un tempo piccolo (2020)
- Und Dann... (E poi...) (1974)
- Uno (Tango celebre) (1966)
- Uno spicchio di luna
- Uomo (1971)
- Uomo ferito (1992)
- Upa neguinho (1970)
- Uscita 29 (1989)
- Uvas maduras (Succhiando l'uva) (2007)

== V ==
- Va bene, va bene così (1994)
- Vacanze (1971)
- Vai e vai e vai (2005)
- Valentino vale (1963)
- Valsinha (2007)
- Vedrai vedrai (1971)
- Veni Creator Spiritus (2000)
- Vento nel vento (2018)
- Venus (1959)
- Venus (1986)
- Verde luna (1981)
- Via di qua (1986)
- Vincenzina e la fabbrica (1977)
- Vita vita (1977)
- Viva lei (1970)
- Voce 'e notte (1961)
- Voglio stare bene (1980)
- Voi ch'amate lo criatore (2000)
- Vola, vola, vola (1968)
- Vola vola da me (1962)
- Volami nel cuore (1996)
- Volendo si può (1972)
- Volevo scriverti da tanto (2018)
- Voli di risposte (1992)
- Volpi nei pollai (2009)
- Vorrei averti nonostante tutto (1972)
- Vorrei che fosse amore (1968)
- Vorrei saper perchè (1959)
- Vuela por mi vida (Volami nel cuore) (2007)
- Vulcano (1963)

== W ==
- Walk On By (1981)
- Walking the Town (2010)
- Wave (Vou te contar) (1994)
- We Are the Champions (1978)
- What'd I Say (1965)
- When (1958)
- When I'm Sixty-Four (1993)
- When You Let Me Go (Cosa resterà degli anni '80) (1995)
- When Your Lover Has Gone (1989)
- Where Would I Be Without Your Love? (Ancora dolcemente) (1978)
- Whisky (1959)
- White Christmas (2013)
- Why? (Why Do You Treat Me Like You Do) (Vorrei averti nonostante tutto) (1978)
- Wind of Change (2002)
- With a Little Help from My Friends (2022)

== Y ==
- Yeeeeh (Ain't Gonna Eat My Heart Out Anymore) (1990)
- Yesterday (1971)
- Yo pienso en ti (E penso a te) (1972)
- Yo qué puedo hacer (Uomo) (1972)
- You Are My Destiny (1960)
- You Are My Love (1985)
- You Go to My Head (1964)
- You Get Me (2010)
- You Keep Me Hangin' On (1980)
- You Make Me Feel Brand New (1987)
- You're Tired of Me (Mi vuoi lasciar) (1960)
- You'll Never Never Know (1988)
- You're Mine You (1969)
- You're So Vain (1985)
- You've Made Me So Very Happy (1972)
- Young at Love (1965)

== Z ==
- Zio Tom (1990)
- Zum pa pa (2023)
- Zum zum zum (1968)
