= Due note =

Studio album by Mina
- Released: September 18, 1961
- Length: 35:12
- Label: Italdisc

Mina chronology
Il cielo in una stanza (1960)	Due note (1961)	Moliendo café (1962)

Due note is an album by Italian singer Mina, issued in 1961.

The song "Piano" is the original version of "Softly, as I Leave You", translated in English by Hal Shaper in 1961. The English version of the song has been covered by many international artists, such as Frank Sinatra, Doris Day, Elvis Presley, Shirley Bassey, Shirley Horn and Michael Bublé.

Leon René's song, "Gloria", has been covered by Mina a second time, in its original version, in her 1987's album Rane supreme.

== Track listing ==
=== Side A ===
No.	Title	Writer(s)	Length
1.	"Due note"	Antonio Amurri, Bruno Canfora, Faele (Raffaele Sposito)	2:55
2.	"Confidenziale"	Vito Pallavicini, Pino Massara	2:45
3.	"'Na sera 'e maggio"	Giuseppe Cioffi, Gigi Pisano	3:18
4.	"Come sinfonia"	Pino Donaggio	2:37
5.	"Piano"	Giorgio Calabrese, Tony De Vita	2:52
6.	"Le mille bolle blu"	Vito Pallavicini, Carlo Alberto Rossi	3:54
Total length:			18:21

=== Side B ===
No.	Title	Writer(s)	Length
1.	"La fine del mondo"	Fiorenzo Fiorentini, Enrico Polito	2:46
2.	"Gloria (Gloria)"	Leon René, Misselvia (Elvia Figliuolo)	2:54
3.	"Le cinque della sera"	Vito Pallavicini, Carlo Alberto Rossi, Enzo Bonagura	3:26
4.	"Non voglio cioccolata (Ich will keine Schokolade)"	Jack Morrow, Mario Panzeri	1:51
5.	"Io amo tu ami"	Gino Redi, Enzo Bonagura	3:27
6.	"Prendi una matita"	Mogol, Pino Massara	2:27
Total length:			16:51
