= Ora o mai più =

Ora o mai più (Italian for 'Now or never') may refer to:

== Music ==
- "Ora o mai più" (song), 1965 song by Mina
- "Ora o mai più", 2015 song by Don Joe featuring Emma
- "Ora o mai più (Le cose cambiano)", Dolcenera's entry to the Sanremo Music Festival 2016
- "Ora o mai più", 2021 song by Cicco Sanchez and Casadilego

== Film and television ==
- Ora o mai più (film), 2003 film by Lucio Pellegrini
- Ora o mai più, 2018 Italian talent show broadcast on Rai 1
