= Concha Valdés Miranda =

Cuban songwriter and musician (1928–2017)

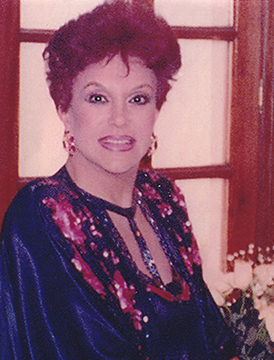

Background information
- Born: July 16, 1928; Havana, Republic of Cuba
- Died: August 19, 2017 (aged 89) Miami, Florida, United States
- Occupations: Singer, pianist, composer

Concha Valdés Miranda (July 16, 1928 – August 19, 2017) was a Cuban songwriter and performer of Cuban music.

Miranda was born in Havana, Cuba. Her greatest success may have been "El que más te ha querido". It was nominated for the Grammy and the first place in the United States. In addition, she is the author of numerous songs that were popular in the voices of performers such as Toña la Negra, Celia Cruz, Lucía Méndez, Olga Guillot, Tito Rodríguez, Felipe Pirela, Joel Gabino, Los Panchos, Gilberto Santa Rosa, Santos Colón, Floria Márquez, Ismael Miranda, Tito Nieves, Tito Puente, Sergio Vargas, Johnny Ventura, Cheo Feliciano and Dyango, among others.

Many of her compositions have been used as themes in Spanish and Mexican movies. She is among the first artists to become part of the composers of Latin Songwriters Hall of Fame. She died in Miami, aged 89.

== Songs ==
- El que más te ha querido
- El viaje
- La mitad
- Como es possible
- Házmelo otra vez
- Tápame contigo
- Orgasmo
- Un poco de ti
- Haz lo que tu quieras
- Lo puro
- Mi principio y mi final
- Ven a vivir conmigo
- Tú te lo pierdes
- Aburrida
- En el medio de la vida
- Como antes
- Las cosas buenas de la vida
- Un poco de ti
- Hoy es viernes
- Dos milagros
- Eso que dices de mí
- Voy a quitarme el luto
- Déjame ser
- Voy a ver si me acuerdo
- En el libro de mi vida
- Sangre de bolero
- Mi mujer
- Estás jugando conmigo
- Nuestro amor
- Cuánto te quiero
- Algo me dice que no
- Cariño mio
- Lo nuestro
- Yo no lo sabía
- Señor Usted
- Estoy buscando un hombre
- Doctor

== Discography ==
- Concha Valdes Miranda interpreta sus canciones, (LD) KUBANEY MT 323
- Concha Valdes Miranda: Erotismo y osadía, (LD) RODVEN 2012.

== Movies ==
- Tápame contigo (1970) Tápame contigo
- Sauna (1990) Sauna
- Jamón Jamón (1992) Jamón, Jamón
