= Cristian Trombetta =

Argentine footballer

Personal information
- Full name: Cristian Trombetta
- Date of birth: October 15, 1986 (age 40)
- Place of birth: Rancul, Argentina
- Height: 1.93 m (6 ft 4 in)
- Position: Left back

Team information
- Current team: Anconitana

Senior career*
Years	Team	Apps	(Gls)
2006–2009	Nueva Chicago	59	(2)
2009–2010	Leixões	6	(0)
2010–2011	Tigre	18	(0)
2011–2012	Arsenal de Sarandí	8	(1)
2012–2013	Chiapas	1	(0)
2013–2014	Olimpo	5	(0)
2014–2015	Tristán Suárez	11	(0)
2015	CD Olmedo		
2015	San Lorenzo	17	(8)
2016	Sportivo Luqueño	13	(1)
2016–2017	Quilmes	8	(0)
2017–2018	Independiente Rivadavia	5	(0)
2018–	Anconitana		
- * Club domestic league appearances and goals as of 1 February 2018

Cristian Trombetta (born October 15, 1986, in Rancul, La Pampa) is an Argentine footballer currently playing for US Anconitana in Italy.

== Career ==
Trombetta began his playing career with Nueva Chicago in the Argentine 2nd division. The club was promoted to the Primera División in 2006, but relegated the following season after losing an end of season playoff. The club began the new 2nd division season with an 18-point deduction due to violence following their relegation and was consequently relegated to the regionalised 3rd division. After one season playing in the 3rd tier of Argentine football Trombetta joined Leixões S.C. of Portugal.

Trombetta returned to Argentina in 2010 to play for Tigre in the top tier. He subsequently signed for Arsenal de Sarandí in 2011.

== Honours ==
Arsenal

- Argentine Primera División (1): 2012 Clausura
