= Sconcerto =

Studio album by Mina
- Released: 19 April 2001
- Recorded: 2001
- Studio: Studi GSU, Lugano
- Length: 49:25
- Label: PDU
- Producer: Gianni Ferrio

Mina chronology
Colección latina (2001)	Sconcerto (2001)	Veleno (2002)

Sconcerto is an album by Italian singer Mina, issued in 2001.

The album is an homage to the songs of Grammy Award-winning Italian singer, songwriter, and composer Domenico Modugno.

As the (double-meaning) title of the album suggests, the songs are mostly sung with the backing of an orchestra or jazz combo and do not include the famous monologues heard at the beginning of several Modugno hits.

== Track listing ==
No.	Title	Writer(s)	Length
1.	"Tu sì 'na cosa grande"	Domenico Modugno; Roberto Gigli	4:54
2.	"Pasqualino marajà"	Modugno; Franco Migliacci	4:13
3.	"Resta cu'mme"	Modugno; Dino Verde	5:04
4.	"Amara terra mia"	Modugno; Enrica Bonaccorti	4:19
5.	"Notte di luna calante"	Modugno	5:26
6.	"La donna riccia"	Modugno	3:09
7.	"Dio, come ti amo"	Modugno	5:39
8.	"Strada 'nfosa"	Modugno	4:41
9.	"Come hai fatto"	Modugno	4:42
10.	"La lontananza"	Modugno; Bonaccorti	6:19
11.	"Nel blu, dipinto di blu (Volare)"	Modugno; Migliacci	1:50
Total length:			49:25

== Charts ==
Chart performance for Sconcerto
Chart (2001–2023)	Peak position
European Albums (Music & Media)	34
Italian Albums (FIMI)	2
Italian Vinyl Albums (FIMI)	19

== Certifications and sales ==
Region	Certification	Certified units/sales
Italy	—	200,000
