= Renato (album) =

Studio album by Mina
- Released: December 1962
- Recorded: 1961–1962
- Genre: Pop
- Length: 31:04
- Language: Italian
- Label: Italdisc

Mina chronology
| Moliendo café (1962) | Renato (1962) | Stessa spiaggia, stesso mare (1963) |

Singles from Renato
- 1. "Sabato notte" Released: November 1961; 2. "Renato" Released: 12 April 1962; 3. "Chihuahua" Released: 16 April 1962; 4. "Improvvisamente" Released: 27 September 1962

Renato is the fifth studio album by Italian singer Mina released in December 1962 through Italdisc.

== Overview ==
The record is a collection of songs released by Mina mainly in 1962 (with the exception of "Sabato notte" and "Un tale"—they are from 1961). The only new song on the album is "Chopin cha cha". Notably, the album did not include the single "Il disco rotto", released in October 1962, although its B-side "Si lo so" was included on 1963 album Stessa spiaggia, stesso mare.

"Sabato notte" was the theme song for the TV show Studio Uno, while "Stringimi forte i polsi" was the theme song for the TV show Canzonissima. "Eclisse twist" was the main theme song for Michelangelo Antonioni's film L'eclisse. Mina also recorded a French version of this song under the title of "Eclipse twist".

Mina covered the song "Renato" in French and in the original Spanish version, "Renata". She also recorded the original version of "Da chi" ("Y de ahí") and a Spanish version of "Chihuahua". All the songs were published, during the 1990s, in different unofficial compilations (Notre etoile, Mina latina due, Mina canta in spagnolo).

== Track listing ==
Side A
| No. | Title | Writer(s) | Length |
|---|---|---|---|
| 1. | "Renato (Renata)" | Alberto Cortez; Alberto Testa | 2:12 |
| 2. | "Improvvisamente" | Antonio Amurri; Gianni Ferrio | 3:02 |
| 3. | "Da chi (Y de ahí)" | Miguel Gustavo; Rafaelmo; Giorgio Calabrese | 1:53 |
| 4. | "Le tue mani" | Pino Spotti; Machel Montano | 3:40 |
| 5. | "Chihuahua" | Giorgio Calabrese; Antonio Bertocchi; Mansueto De Ponti | 2:12 |
| 6. | "Il soldato Giò" | Vincenzo Di Paola; Sandro Taccani; Biri (Ornella Ferrari) | 2:06 |

Side B
| No. | Title | Writer(s) | Length |
|---|---|---|---|
| 1. | "Vola vola da me" | Vittorio Buffoli; Testa | 2:18 |
| 2. | "Eclisse twist" | Giovanni Fusco; Ammonio (Michelangelo Antonioni) | 2:50 |
| 3. | "Stringimi forte i polsi" | Leo Chiosso; Dario Fo; Gigi Cichellero; Fiorenzo Carpi | 2:34 |
| 4. | "Sabato notte" | Bruno Canfora; Dino Verde | 2:38 |
| 5. | "Chopin cha cha" | Jorge Calandrelli | 2:13 |
| 6. | "Un tale" | Canfora; Tritono | 3:26 |
| Total length: | | | 15:59 |
