= Due note (song) =

Single by Mina

from the album Due note
- Language: Italian
- B-side: "Uno spicchio di luna" / "Non voglio cioccolata"
- Released: November 1960
- Genre: Pop
- Length: 3:34
- Label: Italdisc
- Songwriters: Antonio Amurri; Bruno Canfora; Raffaele Sposito

Mina singles chronology
"'Na sera 'e maggio" (1960)	"Due note" (1960)	"'O ffuoco" (1960)

"Due note" (English: Two notes) is a song recorded by Italian singer Mina. It was written by Bruno Canfora, Antonio Amurri, Raffaele Sposito, and the arrangement for the song was prepared by Tony De Vita. The song became the final theme of the 1960 television broadcast of Canzonissima, and the following year it was included in the album of the same name.

The song was released as a single in November 1960, its peculiarity is that on the reverse side a song performed by another artist was used — "Uno spicchio di luna" performed by Mario D'Alba. The single will soon be re-released, and the song "Non voglio cioccolata" will be used as the B-side, already performed by Mina. The song was a success on the Italian charts, reaching number three, and by December 1960 sales exceeded 10,000 copies.

== Track listing ==
7" single
A. "Due note" – 3:34
B. "Uno spicchio di luna" (Ida Frugoni, Pesce, Mario Quargnenti) – 3:18

7" single
A. "Due note" – 3:34
B. "Non voglio cioccolata" (Mario Panzeri, Jack Morrow) – 1:50

== Charts ==
Chart performance for "Due note"
Chart (1960)	Peak position
Italy (Musica e dischi)	3
