= Alberto Cortez =

Argentine singer-songwriter (1940–2019)

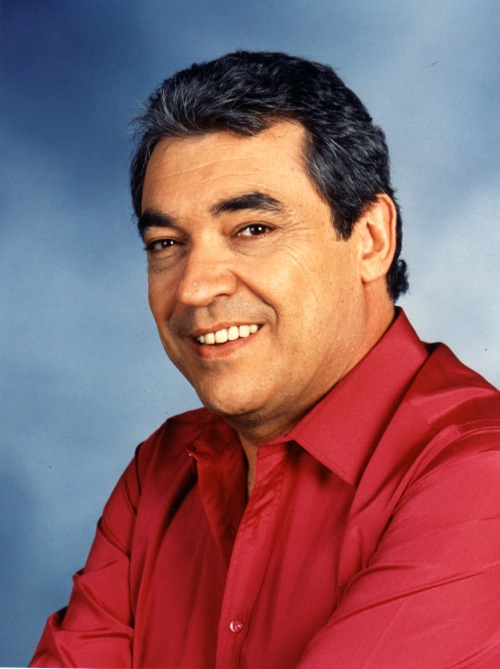
- Cortez in 1980

Background information
- Born: José Alberto García Gallo; March 11, 1940; Rancul, La Pampa, Argentina
- Origin: San Rafael, Mendoza, Argentina
- Died: 4 April 2019 (aged 79) Móstoles, Madrid, Spain
- Occupation: Singer-songwriter
- Years active: 1960s–2019
- Spouse: Renée Govaerts (m. 1964)
- Website: albertocortez.com

Alberto Cortez (born José Alberto García Gallo; 11 March 1940 – 4 April 2019) was an Argentine singer and songwriter.

== Early life and education ==
Cortez was born on 11 March 1940 in Rancul, in La Pampa Province, Argentina. He began elementary school at the Alberto Williams Conservatory at the age of six. He began composing songs at twelve, including "Un cigarrillo, la lluvia y tú". Later he entered Manuel Ignacio Molina Junior High School in San Rafael, Mendoza. There he continued his studies of music at the Chopin Conservatory of San Rafael.

== Career ==
At seventeen, Cortez became the singer of the Arizona orchestra, where he was known as Chiquito García. At eighteen, he went to study in the Social Sciences and Law School of Buenos Aires and sang in bars to help himself with his studies. Later Cortez began to sing in the orchestra of Mario Cardi and was contracted to sing in the San Francisco jazz orchestra. He traveled all over the country with them and began to use his pseudonym "Alberto Cortez" while singing with the orchestra of Armando Pointier. Cortez dropped out of school and dedicated himself fully to music.

Aged twenty, Cortez travelled to Antwerp, Belgium where he recorded his first album. His record "Sucu Sucu" reached number one. Cortez met there his future wife, Renée Govaerts, to whom he dedicated his song "Renata". After a difficult start he consolidated himself as one of the most renowned composer-singers of Latin America with hits like "Mi árbol y yo", "Mariana", "Como el primer día", "A partir de mañana" and "Callejero".

== Personal life and death ==
Cortez married Belgian singer Renée Govaerts in 1964. The two lived in Madrid, Spain.

He died as a result of a gastric hemorrhage on 4 April 2019 in the city of Móstoles, in the Community of Madrid, at 79 years of age.

== See also ==
- List of singer-songwriters
- List of composers
