= Canta Napoli =

Compilation album by Mina
- Released: January 1966
- Label: Italdisc

Mina chronology
Mina & Gaber: un'ora con loro (1965)	Canta Napoli (1966)	Studio Uno 66 (1966)

Canta Napoli is a compilation album by Italian singer Mina, issued by Italdisc in 1966.

Actually the album was entitled Canta Napoli - 20 Successi 20 and was composed of 20 tracks, 8 of which were sung by Mina (but it was the first time they were collected in an album, except "'Na sera 'e maggio" and "Sciummo"). The other songs were:

- "'O russo e 'a rossa" (performed by Gianni Ales)
- "Chella 'llà" (performed by Gino Ravallese)
- "Core 'ngrato" (performed by Angelo Prioli)
- "Tu vuò fà l'americano" (performed by Gianni Ales)
- "Scalinatella" (performed by Quartetto Radar)
- "Serenatella sciuè sciuè (performed by Gino Ravallese)
- "Maria Marì" (performed by Duo Festival)
- "Lazzarella" (performed by Gino Ravallese)
- "Santa Lucia luntana" (performed by Quartetto Radar)
- "Torna" (performed by Angelo Prioli)
- "Guaglione all'estero" (performed by A. Labardi)
- "Dicitencello vuje" (performed by Angelo Prioli)

== Track listing ==
No.	Title	Writer(s)	Length
1.	"'Na sera 'e maggio"	Giuseppe Cioffi, Gigi Pisano	3:18
2.	"Te vulevo scurdà"	Giuseppe Fucilli, Riccardo Pazzaglia	2:02
3.	"'O ffuoco"	Ettore Lombardi, Salvatore Palomba	2:09
4.	"Lassame/Let Me Go"	Ettore Cenci	2:23
5.	"Sciummo"	Lucillo (Enzo Bonagura), Carlo Concina	2:45
6.	"Malatia"	Armando Romeo	2:54
7.	"Nuie"	Rodolfo Mattozzi, Salvatore Palomba	2:24
8.	"Celeste"	Eduardo Alfieri, Salvatore Palomba	3:59
Total length:			21:54
