= Mina interpretata da Mina =

Compilation album by Mina
- Released: July 1965
- Length: 51:53
- Label: Italdisc

Mina chronology
Studio Uno (1965)	Mina interpretata da Mina (1965)	Mina & Gaber: un'ora con loro (1965)

Mina interpretata da Mina is a compilation album by Italian singer Mina, issued in 1965. The songs of this album were all taken from the albums published by Italdisc between 1960 and 1963. Italian wiki says “contiene tutti i brani già pubblicati … dalla Italdisc tra il 1960 e 1963.” Wikipedia

The songs of this album were all taken from the albums published by Italdisc between 1960 and 1963.

== Track listing ==
=== Side A ===
No.	Title	Writer(s)	Length
1.	"'Na sera 'e maggio"	Giuseppe Cioffi, Gigi Pisano	3:18
2.	"Rapsodie (Rhapsodie)"	Werner Scharfenberger, Alberto Testa	2:21
3.	"Confidenziale"	Vito Pallavicini, Pino Massara	2:45
4.	"Stranger Boy"	Roxy Rob (Leo Chiosso), Umberto Prous	3:04
5.	"Mi guardano"	Roxy Rob (Leo Chiosso), Umberto Prous	2:44
6.	"Vola vola da me"	Vittorio Buffoli, Alberto Testa	2:18
7.	"Giochi d'ombre"	Vittorio Caprioli, Fiorenzo Carpi	2:51
8.	"Piano"	Giorgio Calabrese, Tony De Vita	2:52
9.	"Il palloncino"	Roxy Rob (Leo Chiosso), Umberto Prous	2:07
10.	"Qué no, qué no!"	Tullio Romano, Pierino Codevilla	1:47
Total length:			26:07

=== Side B ===
No.	Title	Writer(s)	Length
1.	"Sciummo"	Lucillo (Enzo Bonagura), Carlo Concina	2:45
2.	"Si, lo so (Heißer Sand)"	Werner Scharfenberger, Alberto Testa, Mogol	3:02
3.	"Il soldato Giò"	Vincenzo Di Paola, Sandro Taccani, Biri (Ornella Ferrari)	2:06
4.	"Il tempo"	Alberto Testa, Tony De Vita	2:37
5.	"Dindi (Dindi)"	Antônio Carlos Jobim, Aloysio de Oliveira	2:53
6.	"Non sei felice"	Pinchi (Giuseppe Perotti), Riccardo Vantellini	2:30
7.	"Ollàlà Gigi"	Vittorio Buffoli, Vito Pallavicini	2:17
8.	"Chopin cha cha"	Jorge Calandrelli	2:13
9.	"Un tale"	Bruno Canfora, Tritono	3:26
10.	"Amore di tabacco"	Vittorio Buffoli, Vito Pallavicini	1:57
Total length:			25:46
