= Moliendo café (Mina album) =

Studio album by Mina
- Released: April 1962
- Genre: Pop; samba
- Length: 33:25
- Language: Italian
- Label: Italdisc

Mina chronology
Due note (1961)	Moliendo café (1962)	Renato (1962)

Singles from Moliendo café
- 1. "Sciummo" Released: September 1961; 2. "Cubetti di ghiaccio" Released: September 1961; 3. "Moliendo café" Released: September 1961; 4. "Summertime" Released: 27 November 1961; 5. "Champagne twist" Released: 5 February 1962

Moliendo café is the fourth studio album by Italian singer Mina, released in April 1962 through Italdisc.

== Overview ==
"Moliendo café" is the cover of a song written by Hugo Blanco in 1958. The song was released as one of the singles from the album, becoming the number one for Mina on the Italian chart. "Chi sarà" is the Italian version of the Spanish mambo song "¿Quién será?", composed by Pablo Beltrán Ruiz in 1953. The track "Giochi d'ombre" was the main theme song of the film Leoni al sole, directed by Vittorio Caprioli in 1961.

== Track listing ==
Side A
No.	Title	Writer(s)	Length
1.	"Moliendo café"	Hugo Blanco	2:59
2.	"Soltanto ieri"	Leo Chiosso; Lelio Luttazzi	3:25
3.	"Quando c'incontriamo"	Vittorio Buffoli; Giancarlo Testoni	3:00
4.	"Giochi d'ombre"	Vittorio Caprioli; Fiorenzo Carpi	2:51
5.	"Il palloncino"	Chiosso; Umberto Prous	2:07
6.	"Il tempo"	Alberto Testa; Tony De Vita	2:37
Total length:			16:59

Side B
No.	Title	Writer(s)	Length
1.	"Champagne twist"	Bruno Canfora; Dino Verde	2:32
2.	"Summertime"	George Gershwin; Ira Gershwin; DuBose Heyward	3:58
3.	"Chi sarà (¿Quién será?)"	Pablo Beltrán Ruiz; Enzo Luigi Poletto	2:16
4.	"Tu sei mio"	Chiosso; Prous	2:16
5.	"Sciummo"	Enzo Bonagura; Carlo Concina	2:45
6.	"Cubetti di ghiaccio"	Chiosso; Gigi Cichellero	2:39
Total length:			16:26
