= Floria Márquez =

Venezuelan singer and actress (1950–2025)

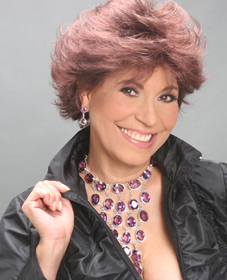
- Born: February 11, 1950; Caracas, Venezuela
- Died: October 25, 2025 (aged 75); Caracas, Venezuela
- Occupation: Singer

Floria Márquez (February 11, 1950 – October 25, 2025) was a Venezuelan singer and actress. She grew up in a musical family, her mother was a classical-trained pianist, and one of her brothers is singer Rudy Marquez.

== Life and career ==
Márquez began to sing professionally at adult age, performing the Latin music genre called Bolero (the Latin music equivalent to the American "Ballad").

She performed in Colombia, Bahamas, Aruba, Mexico, Argentina, and the United States, where she performed several times at the Fontainebleau Hilton Hotel in Miami Beach. She also appeared on stage with Latin stars such as Armando Manzanero, Los Panchos, Lucho Gatica, Oscar D'León, Cheo Feliciano, among many others.

Along with her musical career, Márquez performed as an actress in two plays "Ella Sí Canta Boleros", and the Café-Concert "La Cosa Es Amar" show that was very successful at Venezuela's theaters with more than 200 shows performed.

Márquez also performed over 34 concerts, with several symphony orchestras in Venezuela, a privilege granted to few popular artists in her country. She performed an average of 70 shows each year.

She was married to Venezuelan musical producer and arranger Pedrito López, had two daughters and three grandchildren. Márquez died from stroke while performing on October 25, 2025, at the age of 75.

== Discography ==
- Una Noche Con Floria Márquez
- Algo Más Que Boleros
- Palabras De Mujer
- La Cosa Es Amar
- 10 Años De Amor
- Exitos De Floria Márquez
- Sin Fecha De Vencimiento
