= List of number-one hits of 1962 (Germany) =

This is a list of the German Media Control Top100 Singles Chart number-ones of 1962.

Issue date	Song	Artist
6 January	"Tanze mit mir in den Morgen"	Gerhard Wendland
13 January	"Tanze mit mir in den Morgen"	Gerhard Wendland
20 January	"Tanze mit mir in den Morgen"	Gerhard Wendland
27 January	"Mexico"	Bob Moore
3 February	"Mexico"	Bob Moore
10 February	"Mexico"	Bob Moore
17 February	"Mexico"	Bob Moore
24 February	"Mexico"	Bob Moore
3 March	"Mexico"	Bob Moore
10 March	"Mexico"	Bob Moore
17 March	"Mexico"	Bob Moore
24 March	"Mexico"	Bob Moore
31 March	"Zwei kleine Italiener"	Conny Froboess
7 April	"Zwei kleine Italiener"	Conny Froboess
14 April	"Zwei kleine Italiener"	Conny Froboess
21 April	"Zwei kleine Italiener"	Conny Froboess
28 April	"Zwei kleine Italiener"	Conny Froboess
5 May	"Zwei kleine Italiener"	Conny Froboess
12 May	"Heißer Sand"	Mina
19 May	"Heißer Sand"	Mina
26 May	"Heißer Sand"	Mina
2 June	"Heißer Sand"	Mina
9 June	"Heißer Sand"	Mina
16 June	"Heißer Sand"	Mina
23 June	"Heißer Sand"	Mina
30 June	"Heißer Sand"	Mina
7 July	"Heißer Sand"	Mina
14 July	"Ich schau den weißen Wolken nach"	Nana Mouskouri
21 July	"Ich schau den weißen Wolken nach"	Nana Mouskouri
28 July	"Ich schau den weißen Wolken nach"	Nana Mouskouri
4 August	"Ich schau den weißen Wolken nach"	Nana Mouskouri
11 August	"Ich schau den weißen Wolken nach"	Nana Mouskouri
18 August	"Ich schau den weißen Wolken nach"	Nana Mouskouri
25 August	"Ich schau den weißen Wolken nach"	Nana Mouskouri
1 September	"Paradiso"	Connie Francis
8 September	"Paradiso"	Connie Francis
15 September	"Sweety"	Peter Kraus
22 September	"Speedy Gonzales"	Pat Boone / Rex Gildo
29 September	"Speedy Gonzales"	Pat Boone / Rex Gildo
6 October	"Speedy Gonzales"	Pat Boone / Rex Gildo
13 October	"Speedy Gonzales"	Pat Boone / Rex Gildo
20 October	"Speedy Gonzales"	Pat Boone / Rex Gildo
27 October	"Speedy Gonzales"	Pat Boone / Rex Gildo
3 November	"Speedy Gonzales"	Pat Boone / Rex Gildo
10 November	"Speedy Gonzales"	Pat Boone / Rex Gildo
17 November	"Speedy Gonzales"	Pat Boone / Rex Gildo
24 November	"Monsieur"	Petula Clark
1 December	"Monsieur"	Petula Clark
8 December	"Monsieur"	Petula Clark
15 December	"Monsieur"	Petula Clark
22 December	"Monsieur"	Petula Clark
29 December	"Junge, komm bald wieder"	Freddy Quinn

== See also ==
- List of number-one hits (Germany)
