= Gloria (Leon René song) =

1946 pop song

Most well known as a Doo Wop standard, "Gloria" is a song written by Leon René in the 1940s.

The original version of "Gloria" as written by Leon René was first recorded in 1946 as a pop tune, by bandleader Norman "Buddy" Baker with vocal by Bob Hayward, on René's Exclusive label. It was next recorded by Johnny Moore's Three Blazers, with the vocal by Charles Brown, also on Exclusive, and released in April 1947.

The first version to reach the national charts (#17) was by The Mills Brothers (info taken from the Mills Brothers Wikipedia page). It was recorded on September 22, 1948, and was given the Decca catalog number of 24509 (info taken from the booklet of the Mills Brothers Anthology 2-CD set from Decca/MCA, released 1995). It has a bit of a cool-jazz feel: https://www.youtube.com/watch?v=tDM_uQ6P880

== "Exclusive" debuts ==
René began his own record label, Exclusive Records, in 1945, and the song was first recorded and released on the label as catalog No. 218 in 1946 by the Buddy Baker Sextet, featuring Duke Ellington's former vocalist Bob Hayward. The following year it was recorded by Ray Anthony, and also by Johnny Moore's Three Blazers (catalog No. 703), another group on René's label, which featured vocalist Charles Brown. In 1948 it received a notable resurgence in popularity as a single by The Mills Brothers.

== The Cadillacs' version ==
In 1954, The Cadillacs recorded a revamped version of the song which became their debut record. That initial record listed no writer credit, but later releases of The Cadillacs' recording—and several subsequent covers of the song by other artists—give sole writing credit to Esther Navarro; other mentions of the altered composition list Navarro as having revised René's song. In fact, Navarro was actually the band's manager. Though she received writing credit for many Cadillacs songs, Cadillacs lead singer Earl Carroll claims she never wrote (or re-wrote) the songs.

With over 30 groups performing it, "Gloria" is one of the most covered songs in doo-wop music history. A version of the song was recorded in 1975 by jazz fusion group The Manhattan Transfer for their self-titled debut album, which led a revival of the doo-wop and jazz styles in popular music. Other notable performances include The Modernaires, The Passions, Vito & The Salutations, Earl Lewis and the Channels, Reminisce, Kenny Vance and The Planotones, The Legends of Doo Wop, The Savoys, and Larry Chance and the Earls.

In Billy Joel's 1993 song "The River of Dreams," Joel sings The Cadillacs version of the song just before the fade-out.
