= Veleno (Mina album) =

Studio album by Mina
- Released: 25 October 2002
- Recorded: 2002
- Studio: Studi GSU, Lugano, Switzerland; CambioMusica, Brescia, Italy
- Genre: Pop; rock; R&B
- Length: 49:04
- Language: Italian
- Label: PDU
- Producer: Massimiliano Pani

Mina chronology
| Sconcerto (2001) | Veleno (2002) | In duo (2003) |

Singles from Veleno
- 1. "Succhiando l'uva" Released: 27 September 2002; 2. "Certe cose si fanno" Released: 11 December 2002

Veleno is a studio album by Italian singer Mina, released on 25 October 2002 by PDU.

== Overview ==
With this album, Mina returns to performing original material (the two previous albums were cover albums). The album features eleven new songs, as well as a cover version of "Notturno delle tre" by Ivano Fossati, whose voice can also be heard on the recording.

In the Italian chart, the album debuted on the second position, losing to L'eccezione by Carmen Consoli, in total, the album stayed on the chart for 14 weeks, in the annual rating the album took the 32nd position. It was also able to get into the European Top 100 Albums at the 47th position. In Italy, the album became double platinum.

== Critical reception ==
The album received generally positive reviews. Gino Castaldo from La Repubblica called the album "a polished record with very diverse arrangements compared to what was in the past" and found Mina's desire to "return to the search for quality songs to enhance the culture of Italian song." Pippo Piarulli from Giornale di Brescia wrote that "on the one hand, the album is aimed at strengthening Mina's image as the only great performer of an Italian melodic song, and on the other hand, it strives for cooperation of a more refined artistic level than in the past, as well as in order to offer itself to a more attentive audience to the author's song".

== Track listing ==
| No. | Title | Writer(s) | Length |
|---|---|---|---|
| 1. | "Succhiando l'uva" | Zucchero Fornaciari; Matteo Saggese; Mino Vergnaghi | 4:09 |
| 2. | "Certe cose si fanno" | Gianfranco Fasano; Bruno Lauzi | 3:58 |
| 3. | "D'amore non scrivo più" | Mauro Santoro | 3:59 |
| 4. | "Il pazzo" | Giancarlo Bigazzi | 4:07 |
| 5. | "La seconda da sinistra" | Daniele Silvestri | 4:32 |
| 6. | "Che fatica" | Maurizio Fabrizio; Renato Zero | 4:35 |
| 7. | "Notturno delle tre" | Ivano Fossati | 4:23 |
| 8. | "Hai vinto tu" | Massimo Fedele | 2:35 |
| 9. | "In percentuale" | Samuele Bersani | 4:24 |
| 10. | "Solo un attimo" | Giulia Fasolino | 4:25 |
| 11. | "Mente" | Samuele Cerri; Gianni Ferrio | 4:15 |
| 12. | "Ecco il domani" | Andrea Paglianti | 3:31 |
| Total length: | | | 49:04 |

== Personnel ==
- Mina – vocals
- Alex Britti – acoustic guitar (2), electric guitar (2), guitar (6)
- Gogo Ghidelli – acoustic guitar (9, 10, 12), electric guitar (9, 10, 12)
- Toti Panzanelli – acoustic guitar (9, 12), electric guitar (9, 10, 12)
- Massimiliano Pani – arrangement, backing vocals (8), keyboards (1–4, 6, 8), programming (1–4, 6, 8), production
- Nicolò Fragile – arrangement, keyboards (1–4, 6, 8), programming (1–4, 6, 8), Hammond organ (1)
- Gianni Ferrio – arrangement (3, 5, 6, 7, 11)
- Alfredo Golino – arrangement (9, 10, 12), drums (1, 3, 4, 6–12)
- Bruno Zucchetti – arrangement (9, 10, 12), backing vocals (12), keyboards (9, 10), piano (9, 10, 12), programming (9, 10, 12)
- Giulia Fasolino – arrangement (9, 10, 12), backing vocals (9, 10, 12)
- Cesare Chiodo – bass (10, 12)
- Anthony Flint – concertmaster (3, 5–7, 11)
- Massimo Moriconi – double bass (6, 11)
- Franco Ambrosetti – flugelhorn (2, 3), trumpet (2)
- Gerges Alvarez – French horn (11), horn (7)
- Giorgio Cocilovo – guitar (1, 3, 4, 8)
- Sandro Gibellini – guitar (7)
- Ignazio Morviducci – mixing (1–8, 11), recording (1–8, 11)
- Carmine Di – mixing (3, 5, 6, 11), recording (3, 5, 6, 11)
- Marc Blanes – mixing (9, 10, 12), recording (9, 10, 12)
- Federico Cicoria – oboe (11)
- Antonio Faraò – piano (1, 11), programming (7)
- Giancarlo Bigazzi – vocals (4)

Credits are adapted from the album's liner notes.

== Charts ==
=== Weekly charts ===
Weekly chart performance for Veleno
| Chart (2002) | Peak position |
|---|---|
| European Albums (Music & Media) | 47 |
| Italian Albums (FIMI) | 2 |

=== Year-end charts ===
Year-end chart performance for Veleno
| Chart (2002) | Position |
|---|---|
| Italian Albums (FIMI) | 32 |

== Certifications and sales ==
| Region | Certification | Certified units/sales |
|---|---|---|
| Italy (FIMI) | 2× Platinum | 200,000^{*} |
^{*} Sales figures based on certification alone.
