= Allegria (song) =

Single by Mina
- Language: Italian
- Released: 12 June 1968
- Genre: Pop
- Length: 2:10
- Label: PDU
- Composers: Gianfrancesco Guarnieri; Giorgio Calabrese
- Lyricist: Edu Lobo

Mina singles chronology
"Fantasia" (1968)	"Allegria" (1968)	"Quand'ero piccola" (1968)

"Allegria" (English: "Joy") is a 1968 song by Italian singer Mina. The song is an Italian version of the Brazilian singer Edu Lobo's song "Upa, Neguinho", written in 1964 and recorded by Elis Regina in 1966. The adapted lyrics were written by Gianfrancesco Guarnieri and Giorgio Calabrese. Mina recorded a Portuguese version in 1970 for the album Mina canta o Brasil.

The song was released as a single on 12 June 1968, with "Un colpo al cuore" on the B-side. It was the flip side that became more successful in the Italian charts, reaching number 13. Mina performed both songs on television for promotion, however the studio version of "Allegria" was never released on albums, while "Un colpo al cuore" was included on the album Canzonissima '68. "Un colpo al cuore" was recorded by Mina in French as "Le cœur en larmes" (adapted by Eddy Marnay) and in English as "Can't Help the Way I Am" for the album Mina for You (1969).

"Allegria" was also chosen as the theme song for the annual car rally Autoradioraduno d'estate 1968, of which Mina was the official spokesperson.

== Track listing ==
7" single
A. "Allegria" – 2:10
B. "Un colpo al cuore" – 3:16

== Charts ==
Chart performance for "Un colpo al cuore"
Chart (1968)	Peak position
Italy (Musica e dischi)	13
