= Fiesta Brasiliana =

Single by Mina
- Language: German
- B-side: "Tabu"
- Released: 1962
- Genre: Bolero
- Length: 2:25
- Label: Polydor
- Composer: Werner Scharfenberger
- Lyricist: Kurt Feltz
- Producer: Gerhard Mendelson

Mina singles chronology
"Stringimi forte i polsi" (1962)	"Fiesta Brasiliana" (1962)	"Il disco rotto" (1962)

"Fiesta Brasiliana" (English: "Brazilian Fiesta"), also known as "Fiesta Brasiliana (Das Lied der Lüge)", is a song in German recorded by Italian singer Mina. It was composed by maestro Werner Scharfenberger with lyrics by Kurt Feltz. The song was released as a single in German-speaking countries coupled with "Tabu". In Austria, the song peaked at number 8, in West Germany it was number 13, failing to repeat the success of the predecessor chart topper "Heißer Sand". However, the German magazine Bravo recognized "Fiesta Brasiliana" as the ninth most popular song of 1962 ("Heißer Sand" by Mina was at the top of the list).

== Track listing ==
7" single
A. "Fiesta Brasiliana (Das Lied der Lüge)" – 2:25
B. "Tabu, Es Scheint Gefährlich Zu Sein, Was Ich Tu'" (Werner Scharfenberger, Kurt Feltz) – 2:28

== Charts ==
Chart performance for "Fiesta Brasiliana"
Chart (1962)	Peak position
Austrian Singles Chart	8
Belgium (Ultratop 50 Flanders)	19
West Germany (Billboard)	4
West Germany (GfK)	13
