= Ciuri, ciuri =

Traditional Sicilian folk song

"Ciuri, ciuri"
Performed by the vocal ensemble Eurocantica (sample)

"Ciuri, ciuri" (pronounced [ˈçuːɾɪ ˈçuːɾɪ]; Sicilian for "Flowers, Flowers"), sometimes less properly rendered as "Sciuri, sciuri", is a traditional Sicilian folk song. The lyrics were written by an unknown author with the music composed by Francesco Paolo Frontini in 1883.

== Reinterpretations ==
The song has over time been reinterpreted by many artists, such as Fiorello, Mina, Roy Paci, as well as the well-known Calabrian singer-songwriter Otello Profazio.

In 1964 Gabriella Ferri and Luisa De Santis recorded a version titled "Sciuri sciuri".

During the second weekend of the 2018 edition of the famous electronic music festival Tomorrowland (July 2018), the Sicilian DJ Angemi made a remix of the traditional song, which was uploaded to the official YouTube channel of the festival. The song, in collaboration with Mariana Bo, was released through Smash the House on October 12, 2018.

During the final of the 2020 Sanremo Music Festival, Diletta Leotta reinterpreted it in the style of "Lose Yourself" by the American rapper Eminem.
