= The Passions (American band) =

American doo-wop group from Brooklyn

The Passions are an American doo-wop group from Bensonhurst, Brooklyn.

In 1958, the quintet recorded demos and sought more career-focused members. They found Jimmy Gallagher, former lead singer of the Runarounds, in Bensonhurst. After approaching him at his home and harmonizing together, they formed a quartet with Jimmy on lead, Tony on first tenor, Albee on second tenor, and Vinnie on baritone.

In 1959, during the recording of "Hushabye" by the Mystics, their friend Tony Armato introduced his group to their manager, Jim Gribble. Gribble signed the Sinceres, renaming them the Passions. He provided them with a demo of "Just to Be with You" by studio singers known as the Cousins, who were Paul Simon and Carole King.

In 1960, the Passions recorded "Gloria" with Lou Rotondo replacing Vinny. Lou Rotondo and Albie Galione, along with Albie Contrera of the Mystics, provided backing vocals for Clay Cole's "Here, There, Everywhere" single. The group's next release, "Made for Lovers", was lost by Audicon Records. The Passions recorded additional songs for Audicon, which were leased to Jubilee and Octavia. Their hit song "Just to Be with You" was released in August 1959 on Audicon label, reaching the top 20 in many eastern cities and charting nationally at number 69. The follow-up singles, "I Only Want You" and "This Is My Love", were also well-received and competed for radio play and sales nationwide.

Managed by Jim Gribble, who also managed other doo-wop groups such as the Mystics and The Jarmels, the group collaborated with producer and songwriter Stan Vincent.

In the late 1990s, the Passions reunited with the Mystics and the Classics for the Brooklyn Reunion Show. Lead singer Jimmy Gallagher left the Passions in 1960 to join the Navy but later performed with The Legends of Doo Wop in 1998.

== Original members ==
- Jimmy Gallagher (Lead)
- Albie Gallone (Second Tenor)
- Vinnie Acierno (Baritone)
- Tony Armato (First Tenor)
- Lou Rotondo (Baritone / Lead - replaced Vinnie Acierno in 1960)

== Discography ==
- 1958 - "Tango Of Love" / "Nervous About Love" (Dore 505)
- 1959 - "Just To Be With You" / "Oh Melancholy Me" (Audicon 102)
- 1960 - "I Only Want You" / "This Is My Love" (Audicon 105)
- 1960 - "Gloria" / "Jungle Drums" (Audicon 106)
- 1960 - "Beautiful Dreamer" / "One Look At You Is All It Look" (Audicon 108)
- 1960 - "Made For Lovers" / "You Don't Love Me Anymore" (Audicon 112)
- 1961 - "I Gotta Know" / "Aphrodite" (Octavia 8005)
- 1962 - "Lonely Road" / "One Look At You Is All It Look" (Jubilee 5406)
- 1963 - "The Bully" / "Empty Seat" (ABC 10436)
- 1963 - "Sixteen Candles" / "The Third Floor" (instrumental) (Diamond 146)
