= Moliendo Café =

1961 song

"Moliendo café"
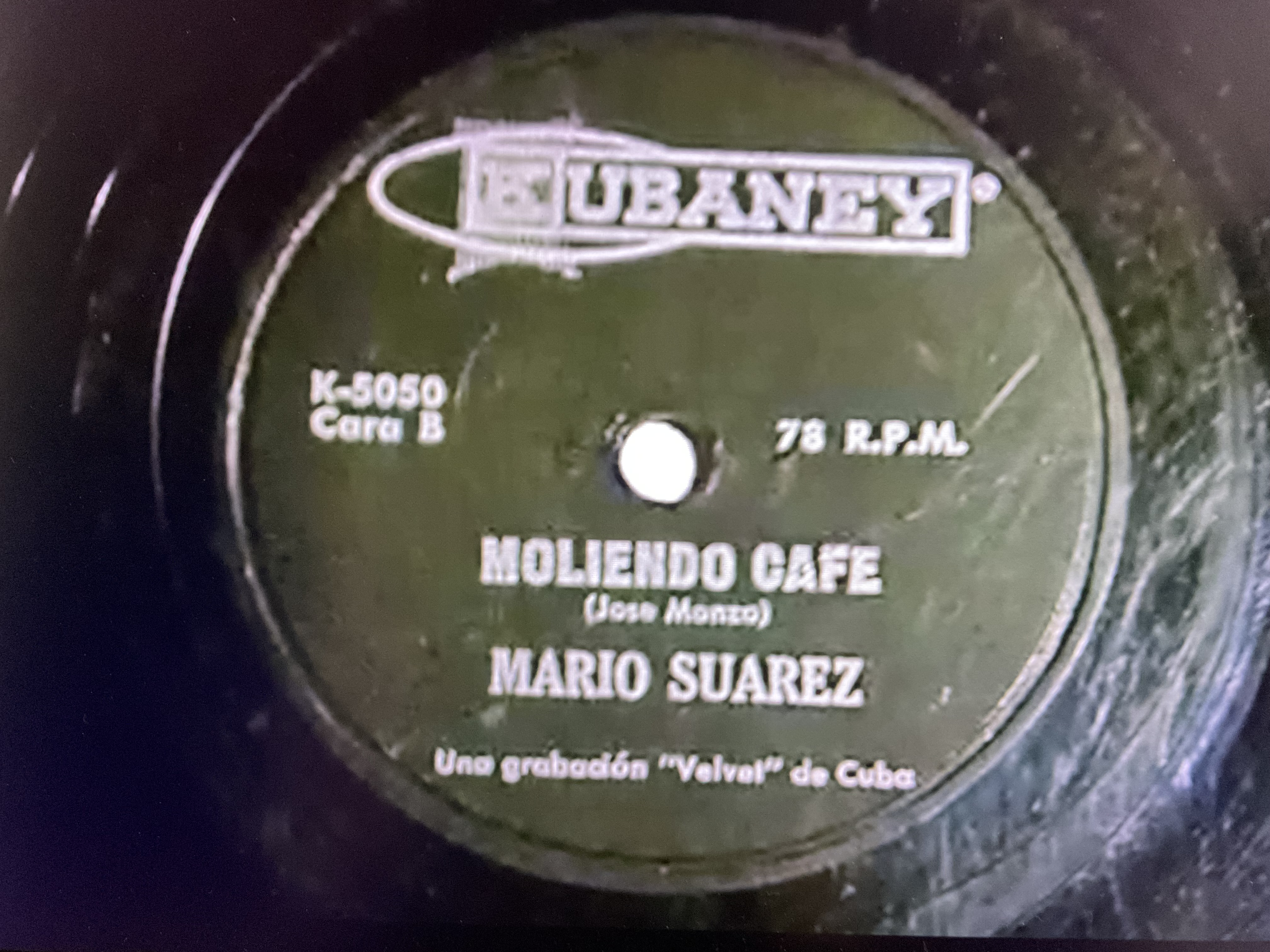

Single by Mario Suárez
- Language: Spanish
- A-side: "Nunca sabré"
- B-side: "Moliendo café"
- Released: 1958
- Recorded: 1958 K-5050
- Studio: Velvet
- Genre: Original genre: Joropo
- Label: Kubaney
- Composer: José Manzo Perroni

"Moliendo Café"

Single by Hugo Blanco

from the album Moliendo Café
- Language: Spanish
- English title: Grinding Coffee
- B-side: "Orquídea"
- Released: 1961
- Recorded: 1961
- Genre: Latin
- Label: Polydor Records
- Songwriters: José Manzo Perroni; Hugo Blanco (disputed)

"Moliendo Café" ("Grinding Coffee") is a Venezuelan song that has become popular around the world. The song was written in 1958, but the authorship is disputed between Hugo Blanco and his uncle José Manzo Perroni. Blanco's recording in 1961 became No. 1 in Argentina, and it has since been recorded by many singers. The song has also become a common football chant around the world as "Dale Cavese".

== Composition and recordings ==
According to Hugo Blanco, he composed the song in 1958, and since he was not of age (he was 17 years old), he asked his uncle José Manzo Perroni to register the work for him at the Sociedad de Autores y Compositores de Venezuela (SACVEN). A few years later, Perroni sued Blanco for appropriating the work, claiming that it was he who composed the song, and that his nephew had stolen the melody.

The lyrics of the song tells of someone who, while grinding coffee at night, feels frustrated at having to work instead of having a love life.

The first singer to record "Moliendo Café" was Mario Suárez in 1958, genre: Joropo; Hugo Blanco did not record it himself until 1961. Blanco's version hit No. 1 in Argentina and Japan that year.

== Mina version ==
"Moliendo café"

Single by Mina

from the album Moliendo café
- B-side: "Chi sarà"
- Released: September 1961
- Length: 2:57
- Label: Italdisc
- Composer: José Manzo Perroni
- Lyricist: Hugo Blanco

Mina singles chronology
"Cubetti di ghiaccio" (1961)	"Moliendo café" (1961)	"Sabato notte" (1961)

In the same year, the song was recorded in the original language by Italian singer Mina. The song was a big success in Italy, spending six consecutive weeks at number one on the chart.

=== Reception ===
Aldo Dalla Vecchia, Mina's biographer, notes in his book "Mina for Beginners" that already at that time in the singer's career, any cover versions, Italian or foreign, inevitably became "Mina's songs" in the collective memory, and "Molendo Café" was no exception.

=== Track listing ===
7" single
A. "Moliendo café" – 2:57
B. "Chi sarà (¿Quién será?)" (Enzo Luigi Poletto, Pablo Beltrán Ruiz) – 2:16

=== Charts ===
Chart performance for "Moliendo café" by Mina
Chart (1961)	Peak position
Italy (Musica e dischi)	1
Spain (GEFIIF)	1

== Other cover versions ==
Cuban singer Xiomara Alfaro's Spanish-language version peaked at No. 1 in Peru. Lucho Gatica's version of the song peaked at No. 3 in Spain.

Julio Iglesias covered the song in the 1976 for his album America, which led to renewed interest. Mario Suárez covered the song in his 2002 album Moliendo Café.

In 2001, Fanfare Ciocărlia (a twelve-piece Romani Balkan brass band from the northeastern Romanian village of Zece Prăjini) included the piece, conducted by maestro Adrian Sical, in the album "Iag bari" (Piranha – CD-PIR1577), released in Germany.

At present, the song has more than 950 versions in many languages. In Japan, the song's title is "Coffee Rumba" (コーヒー・ルンバ, Kōhī Runba), written by Seiji Nakazawa and recorded by Sachiko Nishida in 1961. "Coffee Rumba" has been covered by several Japanese artists such as The Peanuts, Yōko Oginome, and Yōsui Inoue. In Indonesia, the song is titled "Kopi Dangdut" and was a hit in that country in 1991. Ricardo Montaner performed a cover of the song on his 2001 album Sueño Repetido.

== Football chants ==
"Moliendo Café" has become a popular chant for soccer fans around the world, and the chant is widely known as "Dale Cavese" in Europe. The chant was first adopted by fans of Boca Juniors a few years after Julio Iglesias had recorded the song, and it became popular in La Bombonera for a few decades, where the fans know the chant as "Dale Boca" ("Come on Boca"). The chant was picked up by fans of the Italian team Cavese 1919 after coming across a CD of Boca Juniors chants. The fans first used it in a match against Ancona in September 2006, and a clip of their chant "Dale Cavese" was uploaded to YouTube in 2007. The video went viral and its popularity then spread to other clubs around the world, with many fans adapting the chants for their own teams.

== In other media ==
The song, played by the Romani Balkan brass band Fanfare Ciocarlia, is the theme of the DCU adult animated series Creature Commandos.

This song, played by the Cuban musician Pérez Prado and his orchestra is used in the bench scene and the boxing scene in the soviet animated series "Well, Just You Wait" in episode 13, titled "Olympics", which aired on May 17, 1980.
