= Un'ora con loro =

Compilation album by Mina and Giorgio Gaber
- Released: October 1965
- Genre: Pop
- Length: 30:38
- Label: Ri-Fi

Mina chronology
Mina interpretata da Mina (1965)	Un'ora con loro (1965)	Mina canta Napoli (1966)

Giorgio Gaber chronology
Questo & Quello (1964)	Un'ora con loro (1965)	Tutti i successi di Giorgio Gaber (1967)

Un'ora con loro is a compilation album by Italian singers Mina and Giorgio Gaber, released in October 1965 by Ri-Fi.

== Overview ==
The album contains six songs each by Mina and Giorgio Gaber. Mina's songs are taken from the studio album Studio Uno, released in March 1965, only the songs "Ora o mai più" and "Brava" were not released on albums; Gaber's songs were taken from previously released singles, the only exclusive track was the previously unpublished song "Dopo la prima sera".

== Track listing ==
Side A – Mina
No.	Title	Writer(s)	Length
1.	"Ora o mai più"	Antonio Amurri; Gianni Ferrio	2:28
2.	"L'ultima occasione"	Jimmy Fontana; Tony Del Monaco	2:48
3.	"Era vivere"	Alberto Testa; Augusto Martelli; Bruno Martelli	2:26
4.	"E... (E adesso sono tua)"	Testa; B. Martelli	3:01
5.	"Brava"	Bruno Canfora	1:50
6.	"Più di te (I Won't Tell)"	Bob Gaudio; Bob Crewe; Giovanni Alfredo De Simone	2:49
Total length:			15:21

Side B – Giorgio Gaber
No.	Title	Writer(s)	Length
1.	"Come ti amavo ieri"	Gaber	2:21
2.	"Pieni di sonno"	Gaber	3:04
3.	"Amore difficile amore"	Gaber	2:15
4.	"Tu no (Dream On Little Dreamer)"	Jan Crutchfield; Fred Burch; Gaber	2:36
5.	"Dopo la prima sera"	Gaber	2:23
6.	"Un amore vuol dire"	Gaber	2:38
Total length:			15:17

== Charts ==
Initial chart performance for Un'ora con loro
Chart (1965)	Peak position
Italian Albums (Musica e dischi)	10

2018 chart performance for Un'ora con loro
Chart (2018)	Peak position
Italian Vinyl Albums (FIMI)	8
