= Hugo Blanco (musician) =

Venezuelan musician (1940–2015)

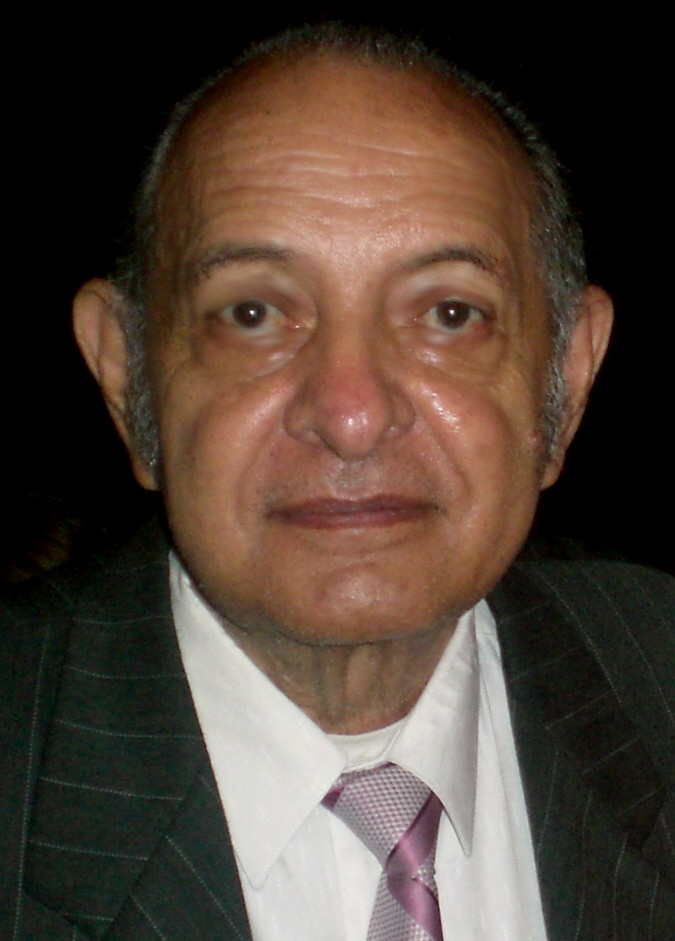
- Born: September 25, 1940; Caracas, Venezuela
- Died: June 14, 2015 (aged 74); Caracas, Venezuela

Hugo Blanco (September 25, 1940 – June 14, 2015) was a popular Venezuelan musician. He is best known as the author of "Moliendo Café" and other songs like "El Burrito Sabanero", "Leche Condensada", "Luces de Caracas", "Sierra Nevada" and "Mañanita Zuliana". "Moliendo Café", written in 1958 when Hugo Blanco was only 18 years old, has become one of the most recognized Venezuelan songs in the world.

== Biography ==
Blanco was born in Caracas, Venezuela. He purchased his first musical instrument known as a cuatro at the age of 15 and learned to play it listening to the radio. Blanco created a new Venezuelan music style ‒ a fusion of Cuban music and joropo ‒ called "the orquídea" in honor of the Venezuelan national flower.

In the 1960s, Blanco composed many popular gaitas with Simón Díaz called Gaitas de las Locas. He also founded what is widely considered to be the first Venezuelan ska group, Las Cuatro Monedas.

In the 1970s, he founded the Venezuelan group Los Hijos De Ña Carmen.

Hugo Blanco's song "La Vecina" was featured in an episode of the popular TV series Miami Vice.

"Moliendo Café" has become a popular chant for football fans around the world. The chant is widely known as "Dale Cavese" and has the same tune as the song.

== Discography ==
- Tropicana, Fiesta Record Company, New York, FLP 1451/Polydor (Germany) 1964
- El Nuevo Ritmo Moliendo Cafe
- El Nuevo Ritmo Orquídea
- Hugo Blanco
- 1° Premio del Festival Universitario de Música: "La India Tibaire"
- Percusión
- Balada del Bombardino
- Selección Navideña
- Me Gusta
- Más Ritmo!!
- Bailables con Hugo Blanco
- Bailables con Hugo Blanco N°2
- Bailables con Hugo Blanco N°3 "La Chispita"
- Bailables con Hugo Blanco N°4
- Bailables con Hugo Blanco N°5
- Bailables con Hugo Blanco N°6
- Superbailables con Hugo Blanco N°7
- Bailables con Hugo Blanco N°8
- Bailables con Hugo Blanco N°9: "Agua Fresca"
- Bailables con Hugo Blanco N°10
- Bailables con Hugo Blanco N°11
- Bailables con Hugo Blanco N°12
- Bailables con Hugo Blanco N°13
- Sierra Nevada
- Arpa Brava
- La Música de Hugo Blanco
- En Trinidad
- La Rondallita
- Lo Mejor de Hugo Blanco y su Arpa Viajera
- La Parranda de Hugo Blanco
- De Fiesta...
- Tania con Hugo Blanco
- El Poder de Hugo Blanco
- El Sabor de Hugo Blanco
- Los Hijos de Ña Carmen
- Arpa Navideña
- Festival Tropical
- El Rapidito

=== With Simón Díaz ===
- Lila + Hugo + Simón
- Ya Llegó........Simón
- De Parranda con...
- Criollo y Sabroso
- Gaitas y Parrandas con....
- Gaita 70
- Gaita 71
- En Salsa
- La Gaita de las Cuñas
- Las Gaitas de Simón
- Culpable?
- Cuñas, Locas, Borrachitos
- Las Gaitas de Simón 5
- Las Gaitas de Simón 6

=== With Joselo Díaz ===
- Las Gaitas de Joselo
- Yo, soy el Rey!
- Las Gaitas de Joselo "La Gaita del Brujo"
- Las Gaitas de Joselo "La Gaita del Barbero"
- Las Gaitas de Joselo "La Gaita de Joselito"
- Las Gaitas de Joselo "La Gaita del Presidente"
- Las Gaitas de Joselo "La Gaita de los Portugueses"
- Las Gaitas de Joselo con Danielita
- Las Gaitas de Joselo "La Gaita de los Artistas"
- Las Gaitas de Joselo "La Gaita Gallega"

=== Compilations ===
- La Rondallita / El Burrito de Belen
- La Historia
- Nueva Rondallita
- La Historia
- Sus Grandes Éxitos
- Bailables de Oro
- Colección de Éxitos
- Colección de Éxitos Vol.2
- Colección de Éxitos Vol.3
- Colección de Éxitos Vol.4
- Colección de Éxitos Vol.5
- Colección de Éxitos Vol.6
- Colección de Éxitos Vol.7
- Colección de Éxitos Vol.8
- Colección de Éxitos Vol.9
- Colección de Éxitos Vol.10
- Colección de Éxitos Vol.11
- Colección de Éxitos Vol.12
- Colección de Éxitos Vol.13
- Colección de Éxitos Vol.14
- Colección de Éxitos Vol.15
- Lo Mejor de las Mariposas
- Caracha Negro with Simón Díaz
