= Renato (song) =

Single by Mina

from the album Renato
- Language: Italian
- B-side: "Eclisse twist"
- Released: 12 April 1962
- Genre: Rock and roll
- Length: 2:10
- Label: Italdisc
- Composer: Alberto Cortez
- Lyricists: Alberto Testa; Renato De Carli

Mina singles chronology
"Le tue mani" (1962)	"Renato" (1962)	"Chihuahua" (1962)

"Renato" is a song recorded in 1962 by Italian singer Mina. A version of the 1961 Spanish song "Renata" by Alberto Cortez, its lyrics were adapted to Italian by Alberto Testa. The song was released as a single in April 1962, eventually reaching number four on the Italian chart and becoming one of the biggest hits of the summer. Sales of the single exceeded 190 thousand copies.

The B-side was the song "Eclisse twist", written by Michelangelo Antonioni and Giovanni Fusco for the film L'Eclisse.

== Critical reception ==
Fernando Fratarcangeli, in the accompanying article for the reissue of the album, noted that it was "Renato" that became the flagship of the album, partly due to the fact that the text traces the turning point of the role of a woman: she provokes, seduces, jokes and even scolds a man.

== Track listing ==
7" single
A. "Renato" – 2:10
B. "Eclisse twist" (Michelangelo Antonioni, Giovanni Fusco) – 2:50

== Charts ==
Chart performance for "Renato"
Chart (1962)	Peak position
Italy (Musica e dischi)	4

== Cover versions ==
A Japanese cover of the Mina version, titled "Tsukikage no Renāto" (月影のレナート; "Renato in the Moonlight"), was recorded by Mieko Hirota in 1963.
