= Le mille bolle blu =

Single by Mina

from the album Due note
- B-side: "Che freddo"
- Released: January 1961
- Label: Italdisc
- Songwriters: Vito Pallavicini; Carlo Alberto Rossi

Mina singles chronology
"Io amo tu ami" (1961)	"Le mille bolle blu" (1961)	"La fine del mondo" (1961)

Audio
- "Le mille bolle blu" on YouTube

"Le mille bolle blu" ("A Thousand Blue Bubbles") is a 1961 Italian song composed by Vito Pallavicini and Carlo Alberto Rossi. Together with "Io amo, tu ami", the song was the Mina's entry at the eleventh edition of the Sanremo Music Festival, where it was presented in a double performance with Jenny Luna. It replaced "Come sinfonia", which originally was meant to be performed by Mina together with its composer Pino Donaggio. In spite of being the favorite, it only placed at the fifth place. Despite its initial tepid response, it eventually became one of Mina's signature songs, and during the years has been used in films, television themes, and commercials.

Artists who covered the song include Dalida, Lodovica Comello, Violeta Rivas, Germana Caroli, and the Flippers.

The B-side was another song from the Sanremo Festival, "Che freddo", which had been originally performed by Edoardo Vianello and Luciano Rondinella.

== Track listing ==
No.	Title	Writer(s)	Length
1.	"Le mille bolle blu"	Vito Pallavicini; Carlo Alberto Rossi	3:35
2.	"Che freddo"	Carlo Rossi; Edoardo Vianello	2:40

== Charts ==
Chart performance for "Le mille bolle blu"
Chart (1961)	Peak position
Italy (Musica e dischi)	5
Spain (GEFIIF)	6
