= Rancul =

Coordinates: 35°03′S 64°42′W

- Town
- Interactive map of Rancul
- Country: Argentina
- Province: La Pampa
- Time zone: UTC−3 (ART)

Rancul is a town in La Pampa Province in Argentina.

== Places of interest ==
- Posada de Campo Mamull Mapu: Hotel located in the area, 4.6 Star rating, 641 reviews
- RestoBar El Tentador Museo:Fast food restaurant, 4.6 Star Rating, 55 reviews
