= Faele =

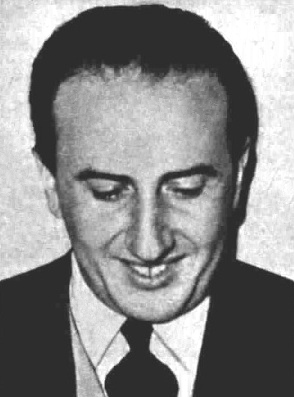
- Born: Raffaele Sposito; 7 January 1922; Palermo, Italy
- Died: 12 April 1981 (aged 59); Zagarolo, Italy
- Occupation: Playwright

Raffaele Sposito (7 January 1922 – 12 April 1981), best known as Faele, was an Italian playwright, radio and television writer, screenwriter and occasional lyricist.

== Life and career ==
Born in Palermo, at young age Sposito moved to Rome with his family. Because of the war he returned in his hometown, where he created for a local radio station a variety show, Il Calabrone.

After the war he returned to Rome, where he began collaborating with several satirical magazines and radio programs. In the early 1950s, he started his career as a playwright specializing in musical comedies and revues. He was a usual collaborator of Antonio Amurri and Dino Verde. His last work was the radio program Il baraccone.

He died because of a hemorrhage caused by peptic in his home in Zagarolo. He was the brother of the actor Carlo.
