= Mario Suárez (singer) =

Venezuelan folk singer (1926–2018)

Mario Suárez (January 29, 1926 in Maracaibo, Zulia – November 14, 2018) was a Venezuelan folk singer.

== Biography ==
He was twice elected the president of the Asociación Venezolana de Artistas de la Escena. His albums include Moliendo Café and La música más pura y bella de Venezuela.
