= Soli (Mina song) =

Single by Mina
- Language: Italian
- B-side: "Un bacio è troppo poco"
- Released: April 1965
- Genre: Pop
- Length: 3:00
- Label: Ri-Fi
- Composer: Bruno Canfora
- Lyricists: Franco Castellano; Giuseppe Moccia

Mina singles chronology
"Young at Love" (1965)	"Soli" (1965)	"Brava" (1965)

"Soli" is a song recorded by Italian singer Mina. The song was written by Franco Castellano, Giuseppe Moccia and Bruno Canfora as the final theme of the TV program Studio Uno. Released as a single, the song entered the top 10 of the Italian chart. The song "Un bacio è troppo poco" was used as the B-side. None of the songs were included on any of Mina's studio albums.

In 1965, Mina recorded "Soli" in Turkish as "Neden yildizlar" with adapted lyrics by Sezen Cumhur Önal.

== Track listing ==
7" single
A. "Soli" – 3:00
B. "Un bacio è troppo poco" (Antonio Amurri, Bruno Canfora) – 3:14

== Charts ==
Chart performance for "Soli"
Chart (1965)	Peak position
Argentina (CAPIF)	3
Italy (Musica e dischi)	9
Spain (GEFIIF)	12

Chart performance for "Un bacio è troppo poco"
Chart (1965)	Peak position
Italy (Musica e dischi)	9
