= Succhiando l'uva =

Single by Mina

from the album Veleno
- Language: Italian
- Released: 27 September 2002
- Genre: Pop
- Length: 4:09
- Label: PDU; Sony
- Composers: Matteo Saggese; Mino Vergnaghi
- Lyricist: Zucchero Fornaciari
- Producer: Massimiliano Pani

Mina singles chronology
"Oggi sono io" (2001)	"Succhiando l'uva" (2002)	"Certe cose si fanno" (2002)

"Succhiando l'uva" (English: "Sucking grapes") is a song recorded by Italian singer Mina. It was written by Matteo Saggese, Mino Vergnaghi and Zucchero Fornaciari. The song was released as the lead single from the 2002 album Veleno, debuting at number two on the Italian chart and also becoming the fifteenth on the radio chart.

A Spanish version of the song called "Uvas maduras" was recorded by Mina in 2007 for the album Todavia.

== Critical reception ==
Franco Zanetti of Rockol noted that here Mina is more than usually happy, relaxed, melodically wide and serenely smooth. Claudio Milano of OndaRock stated that although the track sounds like an unreleased song from a Zucchero Fornaciari cover band, it is a pleasant light piece, burdened with some vocal excesses. "And yet one thing must be admitted... how much self-irony!" he added.

== Track listing ==
CD single

1. "Succhiando l'uva" – 4:09
2. "I'll See You in My Dreams" (Gus Kahn, Isham Jones) – 1:21

== Personnel ==
- Mina – vocals
- Massimiliano Pani – arrangement, keyboards, programming, production
- Nicolò Fragile – arrangement, keyboards, Hammond organ (1), piano (2)
- Alfredo Golino – drums (1)
- Giorgio Cocilovo – guitar (1)
- Mauro Balletti – cover art
- Gianni Ronco – illustration
- Ignazio Morviducci – recording, mixing

Credits are adapted from the single's liner notes.

== Charts ==
Chart performance for "Succhiando l'uva"
Chart (2002)	Peak position
Italy (FIMI)	2
Italy Airplay (Music & Media)	15
