= Ora o mai più (song) =

Single by Mina

from the album Un'ora con loro
- Language: Italian
- B-side: "Addio"
- Released: October 1965
- Genre: Pop
- Length: 2:22
- Label: Ri-Fi
- Composer: Gianni Ferrio
- Lyricist: Antonio Amurri

Mina singles chronology
"L'ultima occasione" (1965)	"Ora o mai più" (1965)	"Una casa in cima al mondo" (1966)

"Ora o mai più" (English: "Now or Never") is a song recorded by Italian singer Mina in 1965. Its authors were Gianni Ferrio and Antonio Amurri. The song also became the final theme of the television program La prova del nove, in two episodes of which Mina took part in the same year. The song was released as a single in October 1965, with "Addio" on the B-side. The single reached number twelve on the Italian chart, spending a total of twelve weeks there. In addition, Mina recorded Spanish versions of both songs, titled "Ahora o jamas" and "Adios", respectively.

== Track listing ==
7" single
A. "Ora o mai più" – 2:22
B. "Addio" (Antonio Amurri, Piero Piccioni) – 2:29

== Charts ==
Chart performance for "Ora o mai più"
Chart (1966)	Peak position
Italy (Musica e dischi)	2
