= Heißer Sand =

Single by Mina
- Language: German
- B-side: "Ein treuer Mann"
- Released: April 1962
- Recorded: 5 February 1962
- Studio: Studio III, Konzerthaus, Vienna
- Genre: Pop
- Length: 2:55
- Label: Polydor
- Composer: Werner Scharfenberger
- Lyricist: Kurt Feltz

Mina singles chronology
"Champagne twist" (1962)	"Heißer Sand" (1962)	"Le tue mani" (1962)

"Heißer Sand" (English: Hot sand) is a song recorded by Italian singer Mina in 1962 specifically for the German-speaking music market. The song was written by German composer Werner Scharfenberger and lyricist Kurt Feltz.

The song was released as a single in April 1962 in Germany, by Polydor Records, and on 12 May 1962, it took the first place in the German Singles Chart, which it held for 9 weeks. In the first six weeks, 150,000 copies were sold in Germany, and 700,000 in total; more than a million copies were sold worldwide.

In addition to the German version, Mina recorded Spanish ("Un desierto"), French ("Notre étoile") and Italian ("Sì, lo so") versions. Italian version appeared on the album Stessa spiaggia, stesso mare (1963).

== Charts ==
Chart performance for "Heißer Sand"
Chart (1962)	Peak position
Austrian Singles Chart	1
Netherlands (Single Top 100)	1
West Germany (GfK)	1

== Cover versions ==
- Anneke Grönloh released a Dutch version called "Brandend Zand" in July 1962 (lyrics by Johnny Hoes). Her version also reached number one in the Dutch charts and hold this position for two weeks.
- In 1963, Lesley Gore recorded an English version ("I would") for her debut album, I'll Cry If I Want To, with lyrics by Edna Lewis.
- For the UK market, Ron Goodwin recorded the song with his orchestra under the title "Hot Sand" as an instrumental piece.
- Connie Francis recorded German version for her album Melodien, die die Welt erobern (1966). The original music track was also used here because Polydor was the German distributor of Connie Francis' American label MGM Records.

== See also ==
- List of number-one hits of 1962 (Germany)
