= Come sinfonia =

Single by Pino Donaggio
- B-side: "Il cane di stoffa"
- Released: 1961
- Genre: Pop
- Label: Columbia
- Songwriter(s): Pino Donaggio

Pino Donaggio singles chronology
"Non ti posso lasciare" (1960)	"Come sinfonia" (1961)	"Tu sai" (1961)

Audio
- "Come sinfonia" on YouTube

"Come sinfonia" (literally "Like symphony") is a 1961 Italian song composed by Pino Donaggio. The song premiered at the 11th edition of the Sanremo Music Festival, with a double performance by Donaggio and Teddy Reno, and placed at the sixth place. In spite of its placement, it was then referred to by several critics as the song of the year and as an instant classic.

The song got a large commercial success, peaking at the first place on the Italian hit parade, and it was later covered by numerous artists, including Mina, Connie Francis, Dalida, Fausto Papetti, Claudio Villa, Natalino Otto, Nilla Pizzi, Giuseppe Di Stefano, Luciano Tajoli, Giorgio Consolini, Jenny Luna, Lara Saint Paul.

The B-side song "Il cane di stoffa" also became a well-known song in the Donaggio's repertoire. Donaggio re-recorded it in a duet with Ricky Gianco for the 1991 Gianco's album È rock & roll.

== Track listing ==
- 7" single – SCMQ 1441

No.	Title	Writer(s)	Length
1.	"Come sinfonia"	Pino Donaggio	3:19
2.	"Il cane di stoffa"	Francesco Specchia, Donaggio	2:25

== Charts ==
Chart	Peak position
Italy (Musica e dischi)	1
