= Shirley Bunnie Foy =

American jazz musician (1936–2016)

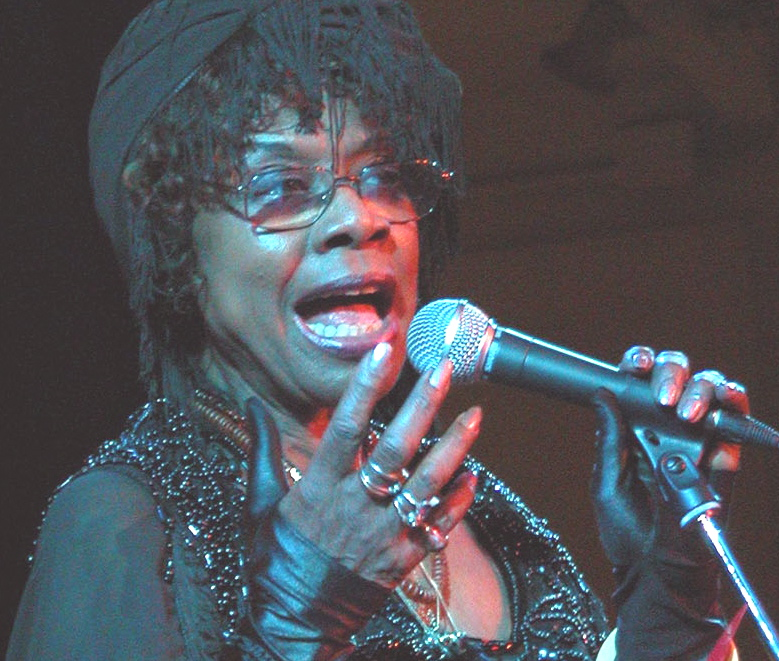
Shirley Bunnie Foy in Cannes, 2008

Shirley Bunnie Foy (October 13, 1936 – November 24, 2016), also known as Bunny Foy, was an American jazz singer, songwriter, and percussionist.

== Biography ==
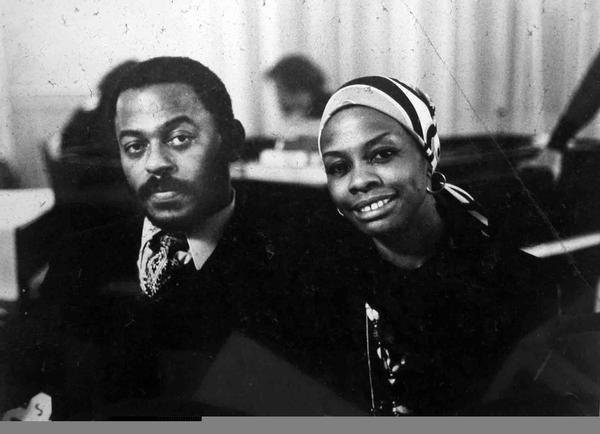
Shirley Bunnie Foy with Archie Shepp in 1975

Shirley Bunnie Foy was born in Harlem, New York. She was raised in a family of musicians and during her childhood she discovered gospel music, spirituals, and blues. At the age of 17, she started her career touring the Atlantic coast and Canada with a rhythm and blues group called The Dell-Tones. The ensemble was formed by Della Griffin, Gloria Lynne, Sonny Til, and Slide Hampton.

Foy settled in Paris in 1959, and after an engagement at La Calvados, a jazz club near the Champs-Élysées, she toured with pianist Pierre Franzino (her future husband), in France, Belgium, Germany, Switzerland, and North Africa. In 1960 she participated in the first Jazz Festival of Antibes/Juan-les-Pins. In 1965, she performed in New York with Archie Shepp. During the following years, she collaborated with trumpeter Charlie Shavers, bassist Arvell Shaw, drummer Jo Jones, and saxophonist Curtis Porter.

During her career, she worked in the U.S. with Johnny Griffin, drummer Art Blakey, pianist Randy Weston, organist Lou Bennett, vibraphonist Milt Jackson and in Italy with guitarists Franco Cerri and Bruno De Filippi, bassist/arranger Pino Presti, bassist Stefano Cerri, pianists Enrico Intra and Renato Sellani, drummers Gil Cuppini, Tullio De Piscopo and Gianni Cazzola, American clarinetist/arranger Tony Scott, and Jamaican pianist Sonny Taylor, among others.

After the 1990s, Foy lived in Nice, France, and continued her jazz career with musicians such as saxophonist Sébastien Chaumont, pianists Ronnie Rae and Jean-Sébastien Simonoviez, trumpeter François Chassagnite, drummers Laurent Sarrien and Yoann Serra, and bassists Bibi Rovère, Fabrice Bistoni, and Dodo Goya.

Her last album, Shirley Bunnie Foy (60th Anniversary), was dedicated to the singer on the occasion of the 60th anniversary of her career. The album was produced by Pino Presti and Mad of Jazz and Claudio Citarella. It consists of 17 songs performed by Foy from 1954–2009 and features Tony Scott, Archie Shepp, Franco Cerri, Pierre Franzino, and Lou Bennett.

Foy died from a heart attack in Nice on November 24, 2016.

== Discography ==
=== As leader ===
- May-O (BASF, 1974)
- Shirley Bunnie Foy (60th Anniversary) (MAP Golden Jazz, 2013)

=== As guest ===
- George Braith – Musart (Prestige 1967)
- Enrico Intra – Messa d'oggi, (Ri-Fi/Golden Jazz, 1975)
- Archie Shepp – A Sea of Faces, (Black Saint, 1975)
- Franco Cerri/Tony Scott – Franco, Tony e Pompeo, (Mallobia, 1976)
- Franco Cerri – Un Suo Modo de Dire, (Dire, 1977)
- Franco Cerri – Noi Duero, (Mallobia, 1978)
- Dodo Goya – 1956/2006 Anniversary of The Jazz Festival at the Sanremo Casino, (Splasc(h), 2006)
- Jean-Sébastien Simonoviez – Transition Cosmic Power, (Black & Blue, 2007)
