= Glauco Masetti =

Italian jazz reedist

Glauco Masetti (April 19, 1922, Milan - May 27, 2001, Milan) was an Italian jazz reedist.

== Biography ==
Masetti was classically trained on violin, attending the Milan and Turin conservatories, and was an autodidact on reed instruments. In the late 1940s, he worked with Gil Cuppini for the first time, an association that would continue into the 1960s. He also worked with Gorni Kramer between the 40s and the 50s. He worked often as a session musician in the first half of the 1950s with Gianni Basso and Oscar Valdambrini among others. He led his own ensemble from 1955, and he played with Eraldo Volonté from 1956 to 1958 and with Chet Baker in 1959. In addition to working with Cuppini for most of the 1960s, he also played with Giorgio Gaslini during that decade.
