= Summit (album) =

Studio album by Astor Piazzolla, Gerry Mulligan
- Released: 1974
- Recorded: September 24–26 and October 1–4, 1974
- Studio: Mondial, Milan, Italy.
- Genre: Nuevo tango, jazz
- Length: 37:42
- Label: Erre T.V./Festival, Atlantic/WEA, Music Hall, ANS, Tropical Music a.o.
- Producer: Mario Fattori, Fabio Belotti, Aldo Pagani

Alternative cover
- 1990 U.S. release on ANS Records named Summit (Reunión Cumbre)

Professional ratings
Review scores
Source	Rating
AllMusic	3/5 stars

Summit is an album by Argentinean bandoneonist Astor Piazzolla and jazz saxophonist Gerry Mulligan. The original LP was recorded and released in Italy in 1974.

== Background ==
The album was born from the meeting, which took place in Italy in 1974, between the Argentinean bandoneon player Astor Piazzolla and the North American saxophonist Gerry Mulligan, considered among the most prominent members of the world music scene.

The album was recorded in Milan and includes eight compositions, seven written by Piazzolla and one by Mulligan. The fusion of the nuevo tango of Astor Piazzolla with the jazz influences of Gerry Mulligan, backed by an orchestra of Italian and Argentinian musicians, has been described as "a memorable disc of rare beauty" and "a one-off event, wholly successful". Again, as with Astor Piazzolla's Libertango, the rhythm section consists of Pino Presti on electric bass and Tullio De Piscopo on drums.

== Recording ==
The album was recorded on 24–26 September and 1–4 October 1974 at Mondial Sound Studio in Milan, Italy, by sound engineer Tonino Paolillo.

== Release history ==
The release history of Summit appears somewhat loose. The LP was originally released in 1974 on the Italian label Erre T.V. Besides a release on the short-lived label of the German chemical company BASF the album was re-released the following year by the German WEA on the Atlantic Records label as Tango Nuevo. In Latin America the album was released as Reunión cumbre on the Argentinian label Trova and (without further title) in Brazil on Pick Jazz. Although several times reissued on CD since the late 1980s the album was not digitally remastered yet.

== Track listing ==
All songs written, arranged and conducted by Astor Piazzolla, except track 6, "Aire de Buenos Aires" was written by Gerry Mulligan.

1. "20 Years Ago" - 6:26
2. "Close Your Eyes and Listen" - 4:32
3. "Years of Solitude" - 4:07
4. "Deus Xango" - 3:45
5. "20 Years After" - 4:10
6. "Aire de Buenos Aires" - 4:37
7. "Reminiscence" - 6:30
8. "Summit" - 3:35

== Personnel ==
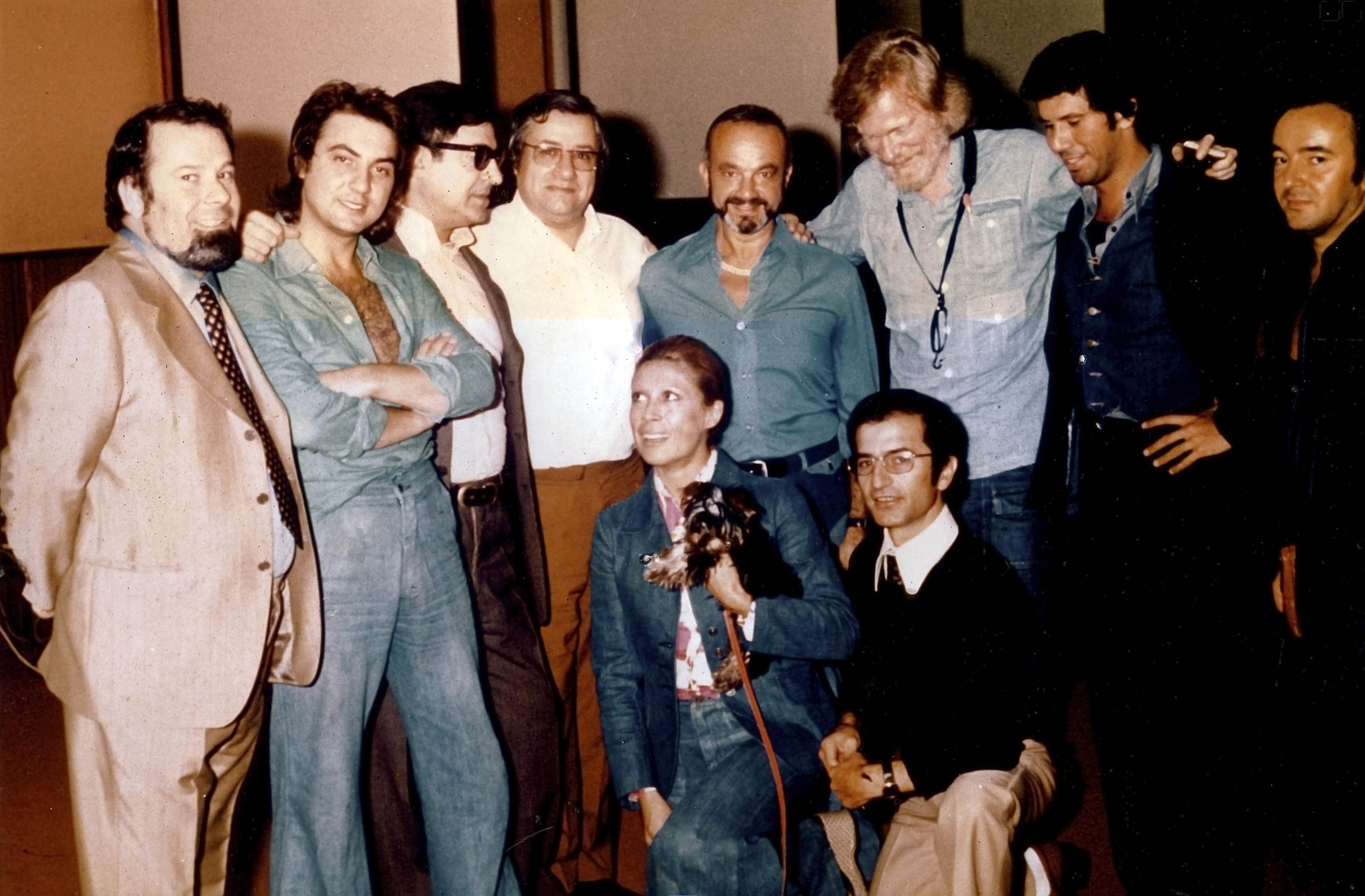
from L: Aldo Pagani, Tullio De Piscopo, Filippo Daccó, Angel "Pocho" Gatti, Astor Piazzolla, Gerry Mulligan, Pino Presti, Alberto Baldan Bembo; down: Amelita Baltar, Tonino Paolillo

Musicians

- Astor Piazzolla - bandoneon
- Gerry Mulligan - baritone saxophone
- Angel 'Pocho' Gatti - piano, Fender Rhodes 73 electric piano, organ
- Tullio De Piscopo - drums, percussion
- Pino Presti - electric bass
- Alberto Baldan, Gianni Zilioli - marimba
- Filippo Daccò, Bruno De Filippi - electric guitar
- String section with
  - Umberto Benedetti Michelangeli - 1st violin
  - Renato Riccio - 1st viola
  - Enio Miori - 1st cello

Production

- Producers - Aldo Pagani, Mario Fattori, Fabio Belotti
- Executive Producer - Aldo Pagani
- Sound engineer - Tonino Paolillo
- Original cover design - Roberto Carra, Marco Cambieri
- Original cover photos - Alberto Rizzo
