= Shirley Bunnie Foy (60th Anniversary) =

Studio album by Shirley Bunnie Foy
- Released: June 9, 2013
- Recorded: from 1954 to 2009
- Genre: Jazz
- Length: 58:55
- Label: Map Golden Jazz
- Producer: Pino Presti & Mad Of Jazz, Claudio Citarella

Shirley Bunnie Foy chronology
A La Costa Sud (2009)	Shirley Bunnie Foy (60th Anniversary) (2013)

Shirley Bunnie Foy (60th Anniversary) is an album of American singer Shirley Bunnie Foy issued by MAP Golden Jazz label, June 2013.

== Description ==
The album is, a tribute dedicated to jazz vocalist Shirley Bunnie Foy on occasion of her 60-year career anniversary, consists of 17 tracks recorded by the singer from 1954 to 2009 and features such noted artists as The Dell-Tones, Tony Scott, Archie Shepp, Franco Cerri, Pino Presti, Lou Bennett, Pierre Franzino, among others.

== Track listing ==
No.	Title	Writer(s)	Length
1.	"Believe It"	The Dell-Tones	2:07
2.	"Watch What Happens"	Legrand – Gimbel	2:25
3.	"Sweet Pree"	Tony Scott	3:03
4.	"Just Tell It Like It Is"	Shirley Bunnie Foy	4:19
5.	"Wipe Away the Evil"	Horace Silver	2:33
6.	"Misery"	Tony Scott	4:57
7.	"It Don't Mean A Thing"	Miles / Ellington	2:54
8.	"Ain't Necessarily So / Summertime (medley)"	George Gershwin	4:21
9.	"Lester Leaps"	Lester Young	4:24
10.	"Tomorrow Night"	Chiosso / Kramer	6:07
11.	"Love Vibrations"	Horace Silver	3:41
12.	"A Sea Of Faces"	Archie Shepp	5:15
13.	"Harlem Town"	S.B. Foy / G. Fabris	0:56
14.	"L-O-V-E"	Bert Kaempfert	1:02
15.	"Summertime"	George Gershwin	6:26
16.	"When Sunny Gets Blue"	Jack Segal / Marvin Fisher	3:38
17.	"Ue Lé Lé"	Shirley Bunnie Foy	1:21
Total length:			58:55

== Credits ==
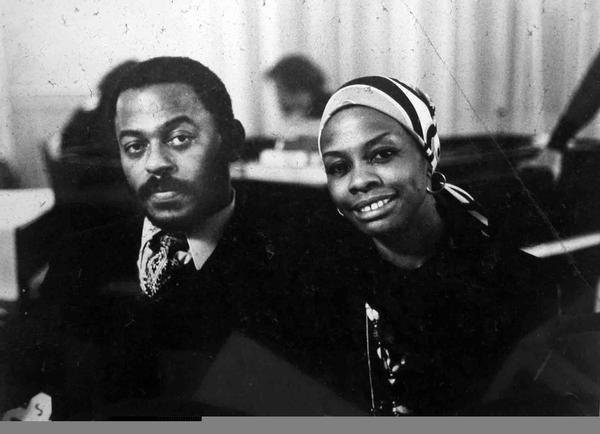
SHirley Bunnie Foy performed with Archie Shepp in "A Sea of Faces"

=== Musicians ===
- Shirley Bunnie Foy: Vocals, Percussion

==== Guests ====
- The Dell-Tones (track 1)
- Lou Bennett (tracks 2, 5, 11)
- Tony Scott (tracks 3, 4, 9, 10)
- Sonny Taylor (tracks 6, 16, 17)
- Anthony Ange Franzino (tracks 6, 17)
- Pierre Franzino (Track 7)
- Franco Cerri (tracks 9, 10)
- Stefano Cerri (tracks 9, 10)
- Sante Palumbo (tracks 8, 9)
- Archie Shepp (track 12)
- Pino Presti (track 13)
- Nicolas Viccaro (track 13)
- Josh Fabris (track 13)
- Jean-Sébastien Simonoviez (track 15)

==== More credits ====
- Producer: Pino Presti & Mad Of Jazz, Claudio Citarella
- Sound engineer: Thierry Scheffer
- Remastering: Pino Presti and Thierry Scheffer (April/May 2013)
- Artwork: Daniele Muratori
