= Matteo Brancaleoni =

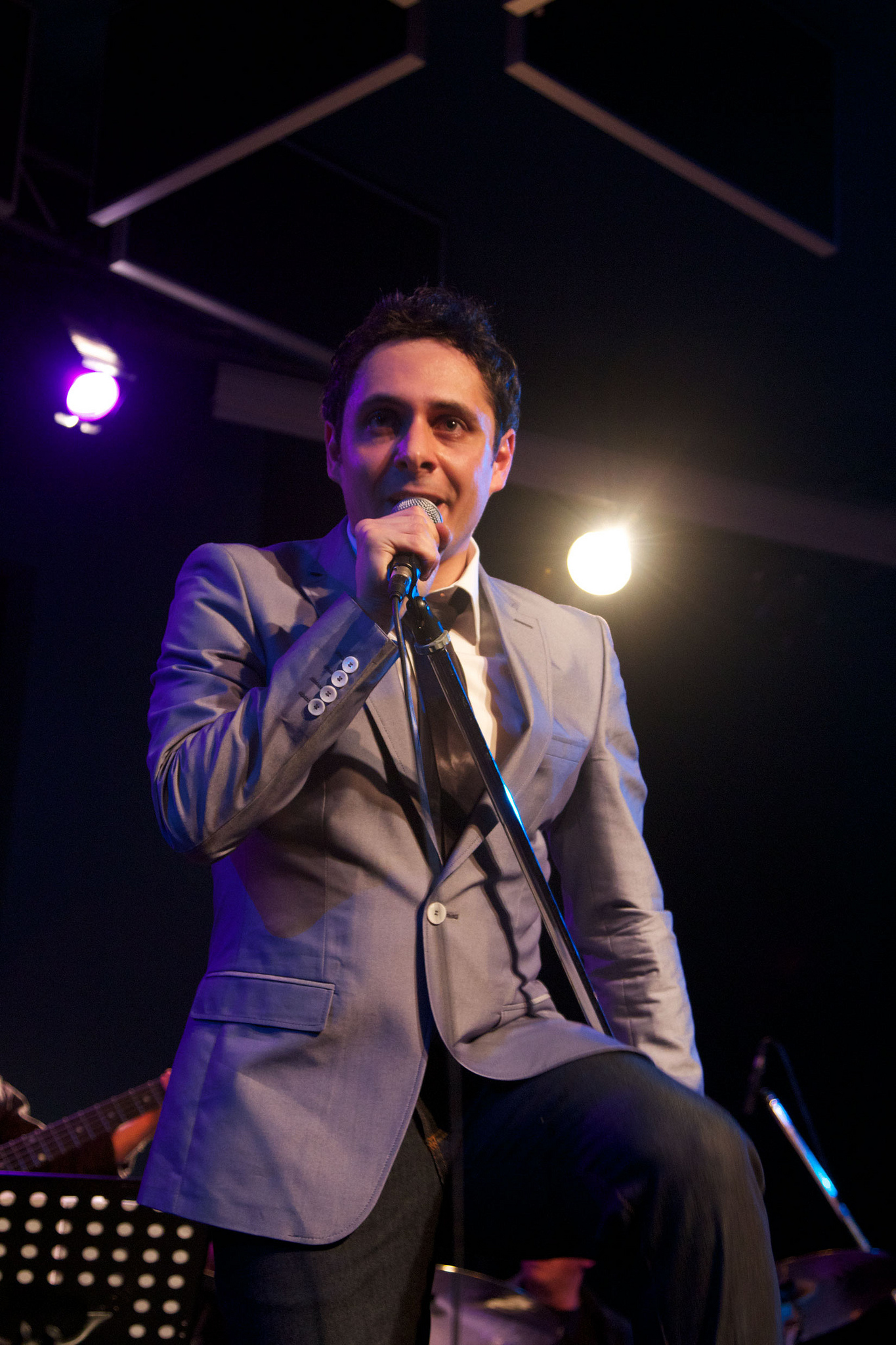
- Matteo Brancaleoni live in 2011

Background information
- Born: Matteo Brancaleoni; 31 May 1981 (age 45); Milan, Italy
- Genres: Big band, traditional pop, jazz
- Occupations: Singer, songwriter, actor, journalist
- Instrument: Vocals
- Years active: 2004–present
- Label: Irma Records/D'Herin Records
- Website: matteobrancaleoni.com

Matteo Brancaleoni (born 31 May 1981 in Milan, Italy) is an Italian contemporary pop/jazz singer, actor and journalist.

== Biography ==
Appreciated by Michael Bublé with whom he duetted live in Rome in 2007 during Bublè’s concert, Matteo Brancaleoni is an Italian jazz singer and interpreter of the Great American Songbook. He was voted among the ten best jazz singers by Italian readers of Jazzit magazine. He has collaborated Franco Cerri, Renato Sellani, Gianni Basso, and Fabrizio Bosso. The magazine Jazz Hot compared him to his idol, Frank Sinatra. In 2008 he wasa named Best New Talent at the Elba Jazz Festival. His debut album Just Smile and his second album Live in Studio were well received by audiences and critics nationally and internationally. Live in studio was for two weeks the best selling jazz album on iTunes and for six months his live performances were listed in the live recommended section by the Apple Store.

New Life was conceived from an encounter with Roman writer and arranger Nerio Poggi (aka Papik), a writing partner with Mario Biondi in his last two albums. A journalist, member of IJJA (International Jazz Journalist Association), the International Federation of Journalists, he wrote for Jazz Magazine and Millionaire.

== Discography ==
Studio albums

- Just Smile (Philology) – (2006)
- Live in studio (MBrec) – (2009)
- New Life (Irma Records/LaDouche) – (2012)

Independent albums

- Merry Merry Christmas (D'Herin Records) – (2008)

Live albums

- Live! with Gianpaolo Petrini Big Band (D'Herin Records) – (2012)

Compilation

- 2006 Un Sanremese a Londra – (CSK Multimedia)
- 2007 Il Meglio di Zazzarazzaz (various artists) – (CSK Multimedia)
- 2007 Jazz Magazine (n.49) – (Emme K Editore, New Sounds2000)
- 2024 Canzoni Italiane Allegre – (Irma Records)

Singles

- 2024 Signorina – (Irma Records)

Guest appearances

- 2007 Time After Time, Still In My Heart, (Michela Lombardi, Renato Sellani) – (Philology)
- 2007 For All We Know, Moonlight Becomes You, (Michela Lombardi, Renato Sellani) – (Philology)
- 2009 Pure Imagination, Enter Eyes, (Andrea Celeste, Andrea Pozza) – (Zerodieci/Incipit Records)

DVDs

- The Gianpaolo Petrini Big Band – Live from Collegno (Electromantic music) – (2010)
- Live! with Gianpaolo Petrini Big Band (D'Herin Records) – (2012)

== See also ==
- List of crooners
- List of Italian actors
- List of Italian journalists
- List of jazz fusion musicians
- List of smooth jazz performers
- Music of Milan
