= Lara Saint Paul =

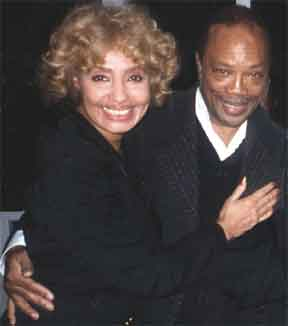
- Lara Saint Paul with Quincy Jones in Los Angeles

Background information
- Also known as: Tanya
- Born: Silvana Savorelli; 30 April 1945; Asmara, British Military Administration in Eritrea
- Origin: Italian, Eritrean
- Died: 8 May 2018 (aged 73) Casalecchio di Reno
- Genres: Pop, rhythm and blues, jazz
- Occupations: Singer, recording artist, television host, record producer, television producer, author
- Instrument: Vocals
- Years active: 1962–2018
- Labels: Red Record, C.D.I., Polydor, LASAPA
- Website: Official website

Silvana Savorelli (30 April 1945 – 8 May 2018), professionally known as Lara Saint Paul and also known as Tanya, was an Italian Eritrean singer, entertainer, impresario, media presenter and record producer.

== Sanremo Music Festival ==
Saint Paul's first public performance was in 1962 at the Festival della canzone italiana, also known as the Sanremo Music Festival, in Italy. She went by the name of 'Tanya' and performed the ballad "I colori della felicità". Adopting the stage name Lara Saint Paul, she performed in the 1966 Festival delle Rose with the song Il pieno and was a finalist in the 1967 Festival della Canzone Napoletana for her performance of Te faie desidera'. Her first big success arrived when she returned to the Sanremo Music Festival in 1968 as one of the two performers of the song Mi va di cantare. The other performer was Louis Armstrong, and they performed alongside Lionel Hampton.

She also participated in Sanremo in 1972 with Se non-fosse tra queste mie braccia lo inventerei and in 1973 with Una casa grande. She was a finalist three times in the Sanremo Music Festival. In 1988, Lara Saint Paul was a producer and conductor for the Sanremo Music Festival at the Casinò di Sanremo.

== Music ==
Lara Saint Paul has worked with many notable talents in the music industry. Her songs Non preoccuparti and Adesso ricomincerei were produced and arranged by American producer Quincy Jones and recorded by an orchestra of Italian musicians, including Pino Presti on electric bass, Angel Pocho Gatti and Victor Bacchetta at the piano, and Tullio De Piscopo on drums, in 1973. In the same year she released an Italian cover version of Killing Me Softly with His Song, originally composed by Charles Fox and Norman Gimbel, titled Mi fa morir cantando. Lara Saint Paul has worked and performed with notables such as Ray Charles, Lionel Hampton, Louis Armstrong, Roberta Flack, Frank Sinatra and Stevie Wonder. Her popular 1977 album Saffo Music, recorded in Los Angeles and produced by Leon Ware, featured The Pointer Sisters on backing vocals, guitar by Ray Parker Jr., bass by Chuck Rainey and was mixed by Bill Conti. One of her 1970s tracks, So, is featured on several current popular lounge music compilations.

The largest markets for her music outside of Italy and Europe are Argentina, Brazil and Japan, and she also performed and released successful albums in the Eastern Bloc, such as her Bulgarian releases of Recital at the Festival of the Golden Orpheus in 1972, Saffo Music, and Bravo in 1981. The majority of her work was released in Italy on the record label Company Discografica Italiana (CDI) and later LASAPA, both of which she owned with her husband, Italian producer and showman Pier Quinto Cariaggi.

== Aerobic dance ==
In 1982, she brought the aerobics craze to Italy, working closely with actress and fitness guru Jane Fonda. The video, book and music album, titled Aerobic Dance and Aerobica Aerobica, and a music single titled A A AA Aerobica, were parts of an exercise program with songs performed by Lara Saint Paul. The program was a huge hit and went on to achieve cult status in Italy. Aerobic Dance won a Gold Record in Italy for sales. A clothing line and The Aerobic Center fitness clubs licensed with the name Lara Saint Paul were also created that featured the aerobics program.

== Television and later years ==
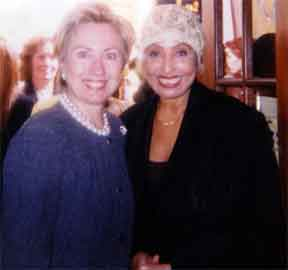
Lara Saint Paul with Hillary Clinton

As Lara Cariaggi, in 1995 she co-produced and wrote the television documentary Pavarotti: The Best is Yet to Come with her husband Cariaggi. It was an extensive biography about the life of their friend, opera singer Luciano Pavarotti, and Lara was the interviewer for the documentary.

In later years, she was on Italian television for retrospectives featuring the life of Frank Sinatra. Sinatra and his wife Barbara were personal friends of Lara Saint Paul, and Sinatra's return to Italy in 1986 after 24 years abroad had been orchestrated by Lara Saint Paul's husband, Pier Quinto Cariaggi, who had also organized Sinatra's 1987 Italian tour. On the Rete 4 network in 2005, Lara was the guest star on Iva Zanicchi's show Io tra di voi and sang some Sinatra duets with singer Bobby Solo for a musical tribute to Sinatra. In 2007, on RAI TG1, Lara starred on the Uno Mattina studio broadcast. In 2008, Lara performed on the Italian television program I Migliori Anni, broadcast by Rai Uno in collaboration with Endemol Italia and hosted by Serena Grandi.

Lara performed live in June 2008 for La Notte della Solidarietà with a concert at the PalaSharp in Milan. The event benefited WOPSEC, the World Organization of Pediatric Surgery for Emerging Countries.

== Viva Hollywood and the Merit of Achievement Award ==
The Italian awards show Viva Hollywood for RAI, a production of Lara Saint Paul's husband Pier Quinto Cariaggi and his company Galenter Management Ltd., was co-presented and co-produced by Lara Saint Paul. It started in 1988 and every year brought Hollywood stars to Italy to present them with a Merit of Achievement Award for their work. It was a success for the Italian RAI network and had very high annual ratings. Bette Davis received the first award in 1988. The nominees stayed at the five star Villa d'Este hotel in Cernobbio and were awarded a bronze statuette for lifetime achievement at the televised awards show. Some of the guests, such as Kirk Douglas, had a personal meeting with Pope John Paul II at the Vatican arranged for them by Lara Saint Paul and Cariaggi.

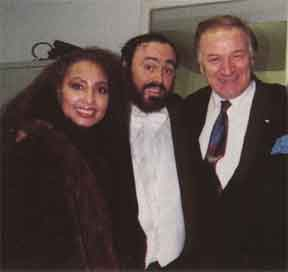
Lara Saint Paul, opera singer Luciano Pavarotti and Lara's husband, producer Pier Quinto Cariaggi. Lara Saint Paul and Cariaggi produced and wrote a documentary on Pavarotti titled The Best is Yet to Come.

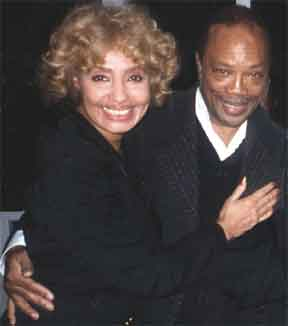
Lara Saint Paul and Quincy Jones in Los Angeles California. Quincy Jones produced and arranged the songs Non preoccuparti-Adesso ricomincerei for Lara Saint Paul.

== Death ==
Lara Saint Paul died of cancer, aged 73, on 8 May 2018 in Casalecchio di Reno.

== See also ==
- Italian Eritreans
