= Severino Gazzelloni =

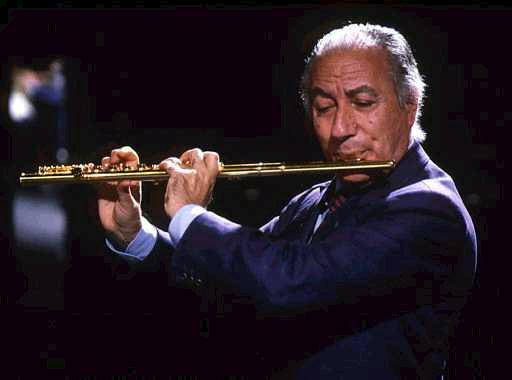
- Gazzelloni in 1986

Background information
- Born: Severino Gazzellone; 5 January 1919; Roccasecca, Italy
- Died: 21 November 1992 (aged 73) Cassino, Italy
- Genres: Classical, jazz
- Occupation: Player
- Instrument: Flute
- Years active: 1942–1992

Severino Gazzellone (5 January 1919 – 21 November 1992), known as Severino Gazzelloni, was an Italian flutist.

== Biography ==
He was born in Roccasecca and died in Cassino. Gazzelloni was the principal flautist with the RAI National Symphony Orchestra in Turin for 30 years and dedicatee of many works. Composers including Luciano Berio (Sequenza I for solo flute, 1958), Pierre Boulez, and Bruno Maderna wrote pieces for him.

Gazzelloni was also a flute teacher. Some of his notable pupils include jazz player Eric Dolphy, classical flautist Abbie de Quant, flautists Ann Cherry and Carol Wincenc, composer Norma Beecroft, and audio engineer Marina Bosi. Dolphy honoured Gazzelloni by naming a composition for him which he included in his 1964 Out to Lunch! album.

In summer 1976 he toured through Italy, performing with classical pianist Bruno Canino and a jazz combo that included Enrico Intra (piano), Giancarlo Barigozzi (tenor saxophone), Pino Presti (electric bass), Tullio De Piscopo (drums), and Sergio Farina (electric guitar).

== Filmography ==
- 1980: "FF.SS." – Cioè: "...che mi hai portato a fare sopra a Posillipo se non mi vuoi più bene?"

== Bibliography ==
- Alessandra Vaccarone, Riflessi d'un flauto d'oro. Severino Gazzelloni e la letteratura flautistica contemporanea (1952-1980), Rome, Riverberi Sonori, 2002.
