= Eraldo Volonté =

- Born: 5 February 1918; Milan, Italy
- Died: 23 October 2003 (aged 85); Milan, Italy
- Occupation(s): Jazz saxophonist, bandleader
- Instrument(s): Tenor saxophone, violin
- Years active: 1930s–2003

Eraldo Volonté (February 5, 1918 – October 23, 2003) was an Italian jazz saxophonist and bandleader.

Volonté initially played as a violinist before picking up tenor sax in the mid-1930s. He worked as a sideman in a variety of groups, under Enzo Ceraglioni, Kramer Gorni, Bruno Martelli, and Aldo Rossi among others. In 1948 he began working with Gil Cuppini, an association that would last into the 1970s. In the 1950s he played in Glauco Masetti's sextet and with Piero Umiliani; in the 1960s, he would continue to work with Umiliani as well as with Giorgio Gaslini toward the end of the decade. Later associations included work with Giorgio Azzolini and Giorgio Buratti.
