= Lou Bennett =

Lou Bennett may refer to:

- Lou Bennett (American musician), American jazz organist
- Lou Bennett (Australian musician), Indigenous Australian musician, actress and academic
