= Libertango =

Single by Astor Piazzolla

from the album Libertango
- Released: 1974
- Recorded: Milan, Italy
- Genre: Tango nuevo
- Length: 2:49
- Label: Carosello
- Songwriter: Astor Piazzolla

Libertango is a composition by tango composer and bandoneon player Astor Piazzolla, recorded and published in 1974 in Milan. The title is a portmanteau merging "Libertad" (Spanish for "liberty") and "tango", symbolizing Piazzolla's break from classical tango to tango nuevo.

== Performances ==
Astor Piazzolla recorded and published Libertango in 1974 in Milan, symbolizing his break from classical tango to tango nuevo (see below for recording details). While touring, he and his band performed an extended version in 1977 for Radio Télévision Suisse Mosaique.

Cellist Yo-Yo Ma played Libertango on his 1997 album Soul of the Tango: The Music of Astor Piazzolla.

It was featured by guitarist Al Di Meola in his 2000 album The Grande Passion.

In 2002 Libertango appeared on Australian/British classical crossover string quartet Bond's second album, Shine.

It featured on the 2004 live album Live: Manchester and Dublin of the guitar duo Rodrigo Y Gabriela.

In 2013 Libertango appeared on award-winning album Surreal by guitar-virtuoso Roman Miroshnichenko.

In 2017, it appeared on the collaborative live album by the Japanese jazz pianist Hiromi and the Colombian harpist Edmar Castaneda, recorded in Montreal.

== Derivatives ==
Although Libertango was born as an instrumental piece, in 1990 Uruguayan poet Horacio Ferrer added lyrics in Spanish language based on the theme of freedom.

According to the performance database at All Music Guide, the composition has appeared on over 500 separate releases. Grace Jones's song I've Seen That Face Before (Libertango) uses the same music, as does Jazz Mandolin Project's song "Jungle Tango", Guy Marchand's song "Moi je suis tango" and Kati Kovács's song Hívlak.

In 1997 Irish folk musician Sharon Shannon recorded a cover of Grace Jones' I've Seen That Face Before (Libertango) for her third album, Each Little Thing. Featuring session vocals by Kirsty MacColl it also appeared in 2001 on The One and Only, a compilation album released after her death. Shannon re-released the recording as the title track of her 2005 compilation.

Cuban-American singer/composer Luisa Maria Güell added lyrics in the theme of the "Libertango" title and recorded it for her 2007 album Una. A more recent version in Spanish of Libertango lyrics belongs to the Argentinian singer, lyricist and composer Lilí Gardés, who describes the loneliness of city life. This version was approved by Edizione Cursi/Pagani SRL, and it was part of the show Zombitango.

== Media ==
In the Prince of Tennis anime series, Atobe Keigo and Sanada Genichirou attended a performance of this song. They used it later to set the beat for their Doubles match.

Libertango was the backing music in the Tarot advert for Volvo's S60 compact executive saloon.

The music was used in the Roman Polanski movie Frantic (1988), and was one of two pieces from Piazzolla that made up the entire soundtrack of Jacques Rivette's film Le Pont du Nord (1981).

The music was also used in the theme song from the CBS sitcom Georgie & Mandy's First Marriage (2024)

== 1974 performance ==
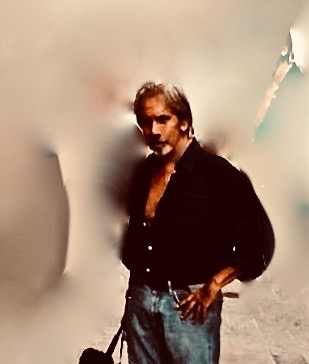
Pino Presti created and played the bassline in the original version of Libertango.

- Astor Piazzolla – bandoneón, arranger, conductor
- Felice Da Viá – piano, Hammond organ C3
- Gianni Zilioli – Hammond organ C3, marimba
- Pino Presti – bass guitar
- Tullio De Piscopo – drums, percussions
- Filippo Daccò – acoustic and electric guitar
- Andrea Poggi – timpani, percussions
- String section with
  - Umberto Benedetti Michelangeli – 1st violin
  - Elsa Parravicini – 1st viola
  - Paolo Salvi – 1st cello
- Marlaena Kessick – G flute
- Hugo Heredia, Gianni Bedori – C flute

Recorded in May 1974 at Mondial Sound Studio, Milan (Italy). Sound engineer: Tonino Paolillo.
