= Irma Records =

Italian record label

- Founded: 1989
- Genre: Various
- Country of origin: Italy, Japan
- Location: Bologna, Tokyo
- Official website: www.irmagroup.com

Irma Records is an Italian record label founded in Bologna in 1989. It releases alternative acoustic lounge and dance music. It currently has offices in both Bologna, Italy and Tokyo, Japan.

== Artists ==
- Sakai Asuka
- Alfredo Sirica
- Angelica
- Simon Baker
- Banda Brasileira
- Baron Bane
- Belladonna (Maurizio Belladonna)
- Big Mojo
- Black & Brown
- Black Mighty Orchestra
- Matteo Brancaleoni
- Ely Bruna
- Capiozzo, Mecco & Santimone
- Captain Mantell
- Don Carlos
- CL (Colin Lindo a.k.a. Alpha Omega & Nubian Mindz)
- Crazy P
- Deodato
- DJ Black Mighty Wax
- DJ Rodriguez
- Elmio
- eRika
- Feather and Down
- Franca Barone 5et
- Freak Motel
- Freetempo
- From P60
- Maestro Garofalo
- Gazzara
- Greenlab
- Honeymunch
- Ida Landsberg
- I-Dep
- Italian Secret Service
- Jacare'
- Jeannie
- Jeni Fujita (of The Fugees)
- Jestofunk
- Jhameel
- Bengi Jumping
- Kaleido
- Kalweit & the Spokes
- Ithamara Koorax
- Danny Losito
- Les Jeux Sont Funk
- Low Fidelity Jet-Set Orchestra
- Ltj Experience
- Lumiere
- Maddalena
- Maler
- Agnesse Manganaro
- Amana Melone
- Modulo 5
- Diego Montinaro
- Sarah Jane Morris
- M-Swift
- Musetta
- Ninfa
- Nu Braz
- Ohm Guru
- Ortiz
- O’Spada
- Papik
- Robert Passera
- Sophie Lillienne
- The Piano Room
- Pinktronix
- Polyphonics
- Provköket
- Rigo
- Riovolt
- Steve Rogers Band
- Max Sedgley
- The Shiffers
- Silvia's Magic Hands
- The Snipplers
- Sobo & Zeb
- Soul Quality Quartet
- Spirit Catcher
- Stalker Studio
- Stockholm Cyclo
- Sugarpie & The Candymen
- Summer Twins
- Supabeatz
- Supersonix Cinematica
- Aaron Tesser
- 2 Men 4 Soul
- John Type
- United Peace Voices
- Woomin
- yuma
- Zerosospiro
- Zone
