= Nunzio Rotondo =

Italian composer (1924–2009)

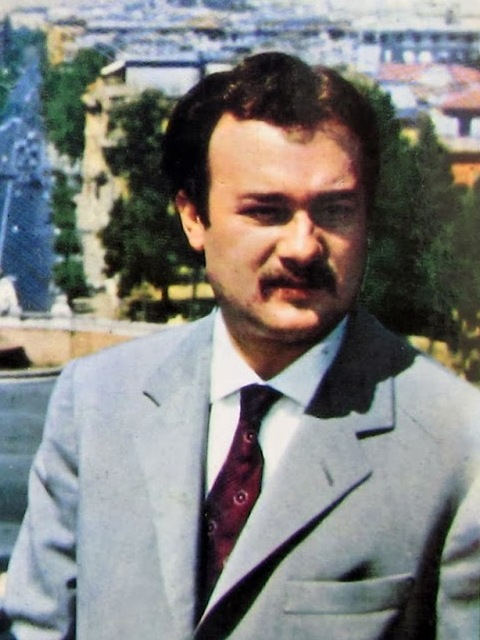
Rotondo in 1958

Nunzio Rotondo (11 December 1924 – 15 September 2009) was an Italian jazz trumpeter and bandleader, born in Palestrina.

Rotondo began on piano in his youth before taking up trumpet, and had already played with Louis Armstrong on that instrument by the end of the 1940s. Early in the 1950s he played with Flavio Ambrosetti, Bill Coleman, Roy Eldridge, Duke Ellington, Zoot Sims, and Toots Thielemans, and also led his own ensembles which included, among others, Gil Cuppini, Roberto Nicolosi, and Romano Mussolini. In the 1960s, Rotondo did little live performing, but played frequently on radio broadcasts with Gato Barbieri, Franco D'Andrea, Pierre Favre, and Mal Waldron. He continued working with D'Andrea through the early 1970s. He was less active in the 1980s and 1990s.
