= 1st Round =

1st Round (album)

Studio album by Pino Presti
- Released: May 1976
- Recorded: at Regson Studio in Milan
- Genres: Funk; disco; soul
- Length: 35:36
- Label: Atlantic
- Producer: Pino Presti

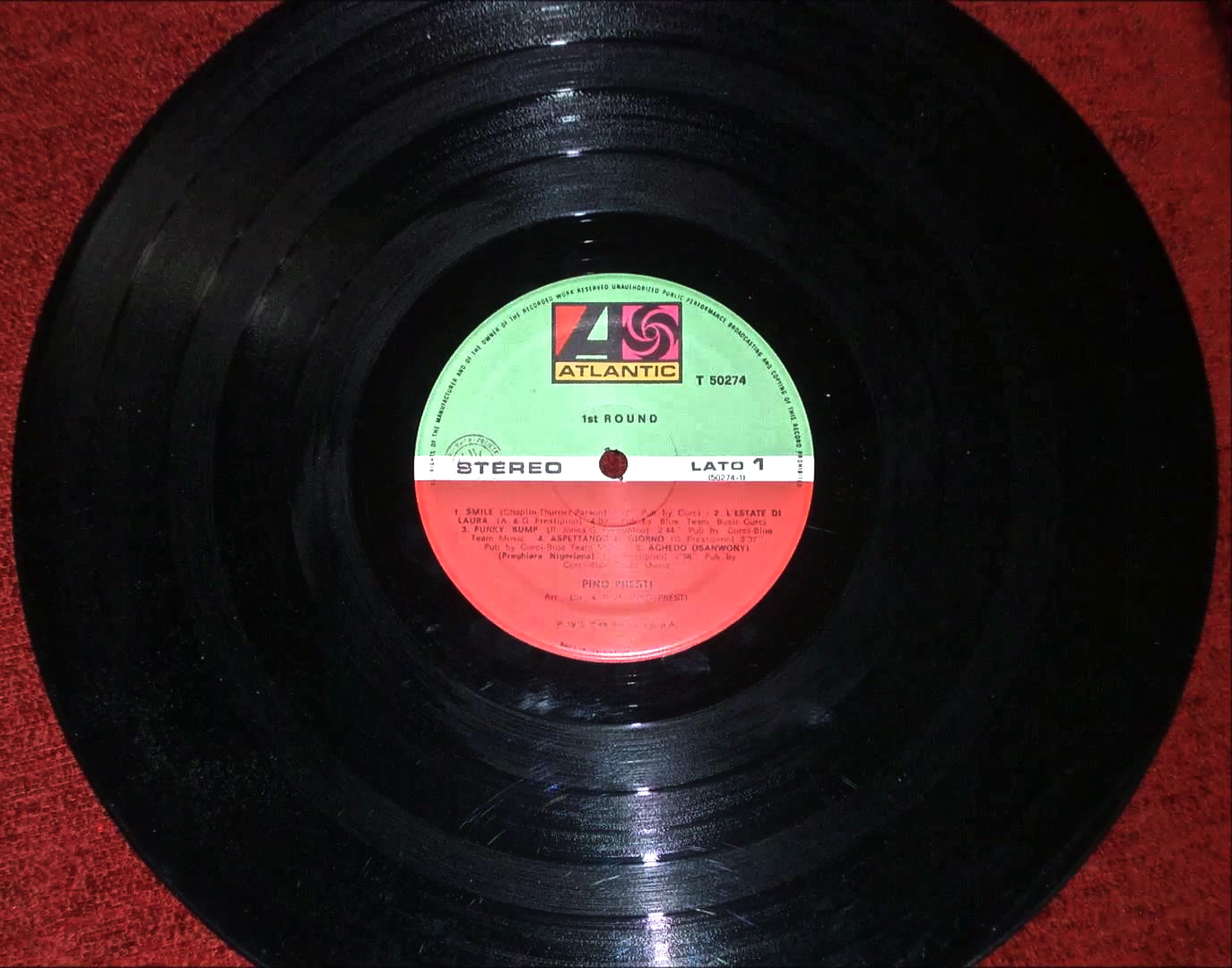
1st Round (label)

1st Round is an album by Italian musician and producer Pino Presti, released in 1976 under Atlantic Records. It's considered one of the most innovative albums of the 70's in the Italian music scene. All songs are composed by Pino Presti, except for "Smile" (Charlie Chaplin), "Sunny" (Bobby Hebb) and "Firefly" (Kenny Nolan).

In November 2024, a remastered digital version of the album, produced by Pino Presti, was distributed on digital platforms by Planet Records.

== Track listing ==
No.	Title	Length
1.	"Smile"	3:12
2.	"L'estate di Laura"	4:00
3.	"Funky Bump"	2:44
4.	"Aspettando Il Giorno"	3:37
5.	"Aghedo Osanwony"	3:20
6.	"Angie"	3:46
7.	"E Se Non Arrivasse"	2:43
8.	"C.so Buenos Aires"	2:42
9.	"Firefly"	2:40
10.	"Sunny"	4:43
11.	"C'era Una Volta"	1:50
Total length:		35:36

== Credits ==
=== Musicians ===
- Pino Presti: arranger, conductor, electric bass, Fender Rhodes, percussions, vocal in "Angie"
- Andrea Sacchi: acoustic & electric guitar
- Massimo Luca: acoustic & electric guitar
- Ernesto Massimo Verardi: acoustic guitar, twelve string guitar
- Claudio Bazzari: acoustic & electric guitar
- Alberto Radius: synth guitar
- Ellade Bandini: drums
- George Aghedo: conga, percussions, rap vocals in "Aghedo Asanwony"
- Renè Mantegna: conga, percussions
- Alberto Baldan Bembo: Moog, marimba
- Alberto Mompellio: Hammond organ, Eminent, piano
- Giorgio Baiocco: tenor saxophone, flute
- Bruno De Filippi: harmonica in "Sunny"
- Riccardo Zappa: acoustic guitar in "C'era Una Volta"
- La Bionda: vocals in "Firefly"
- Attilio Donadio: alto saxophone solo in "Smile"
- Fermo Lini: trumpet
- Giuliano Bernicchi: trumpet
- Gianni Caranti: trombone
- Sergio Almangano: 1st violin
- Arturo Prestipino Giarritta: 1st violin
- Ronnie Jones: lead vocals & lyricist in "Funky Bump"

==== More credits ====
- Recorded at Regson Studio (Milan)
- Sound engineer: Gianluigi Pezzera / Paolo Bocchi
- Artwork: Mario Convertino
- Photograph: Karin Hemp
