= Pino Presti =

Italian musician and arranger (1943–2026)

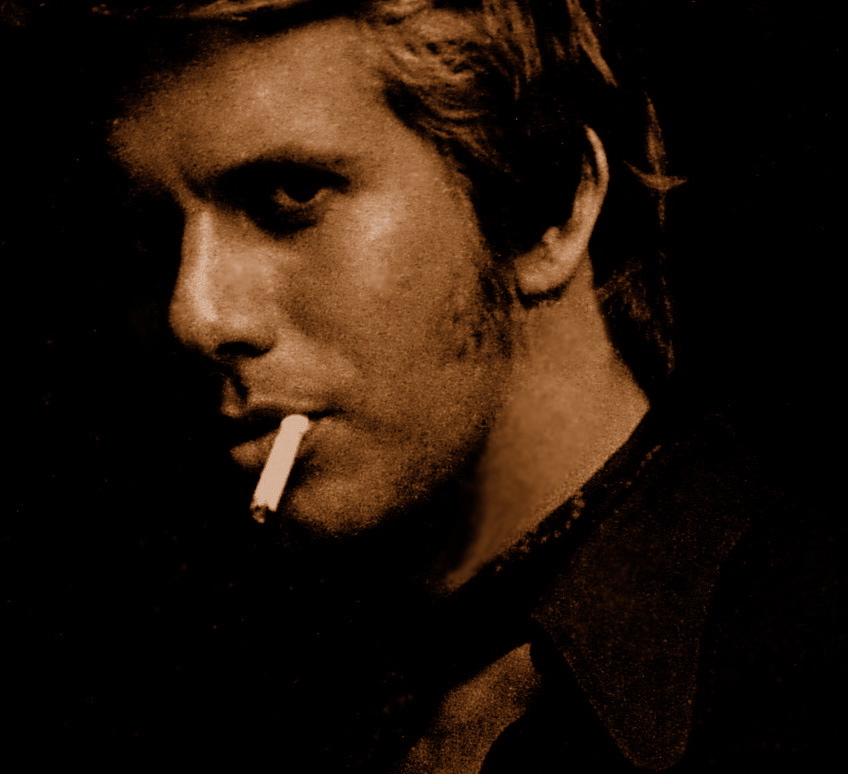
- Pino Presti

Background information
- Born: Giuseppe Prestipino Giarritta; 23 August 1943; Milan, Italy
- Died: 2026
- Genres: Pop, jazz, funk, Latin music, dance
- Occupations: conductor, arranger, Bassist, composer, record producer
- Instruments: Bass guitar, Fender Rhodes, percussion
- Years active: 1961–2026
- Labels: Atlantic, Durium, Saar, Polydor, Baby Records, Emergency, Belldisc, Edizioni Curci, Dischi Ricordi
- Website: pinopresti.it

Giuseppe Prestipino Giarritta (23 August 1943 – 2026), professionally known by his pseudonym Pino Presti, was an Italian conductor, arranger, bassist, composer and record producer from Milan. He was also a 5th-dan black belt in Shotokan Karate.

Presti was very young when he first entered the music business. He started as a bass guitar player, and then gradually began as an arranger, composer, orchestra conductor and producer. Among his collaborations in different genres of music like jazz, pop, funk, soul, and Latin music are Mina (the most famous Italian pop singer), Gerry Mulligan, Ástor Piazzolla (with whom he has performed on 24 recordings as a sideman, including the well-known composition Libertango), Quincy Jones, Wilson Pickett, Shirley Bassey, Franco Cerri, Maynard Ferguson, Stéphane Grappelli, Severino Gazzelloni, Aldemaro Romero, and Tullio De Piscopo among others.

== Early life ==
Son of an accomplished violinist, Arturo Prestipino Giarritta, Presti began studying piano and music theory at the age of six. When he was 17, he started his career performing as a vocalist and bass guitarist in clubs as well as working in recording studios as an instrumentalist.

Although he had a contract with Durium of Milan as a singer, he decided to concentrate only on performing music. He recorded hundreds of songs with major Italian artists such as Mina, Giorgio Gaber, Ornella Vanoni, Gino Paoli, Bruno Lauzi, Fabrizio De André, Sergio Endrigo, Mia Martini, Franco Battiato, Adriano Celentano, Milva, Pino Donaggio, Gigliola Cinquetti, Caterina Caselli, Bobby Solo, Fausto Leali, Michele, Ivan Graziani, Loredana Bertè and many others.

== Music career ==
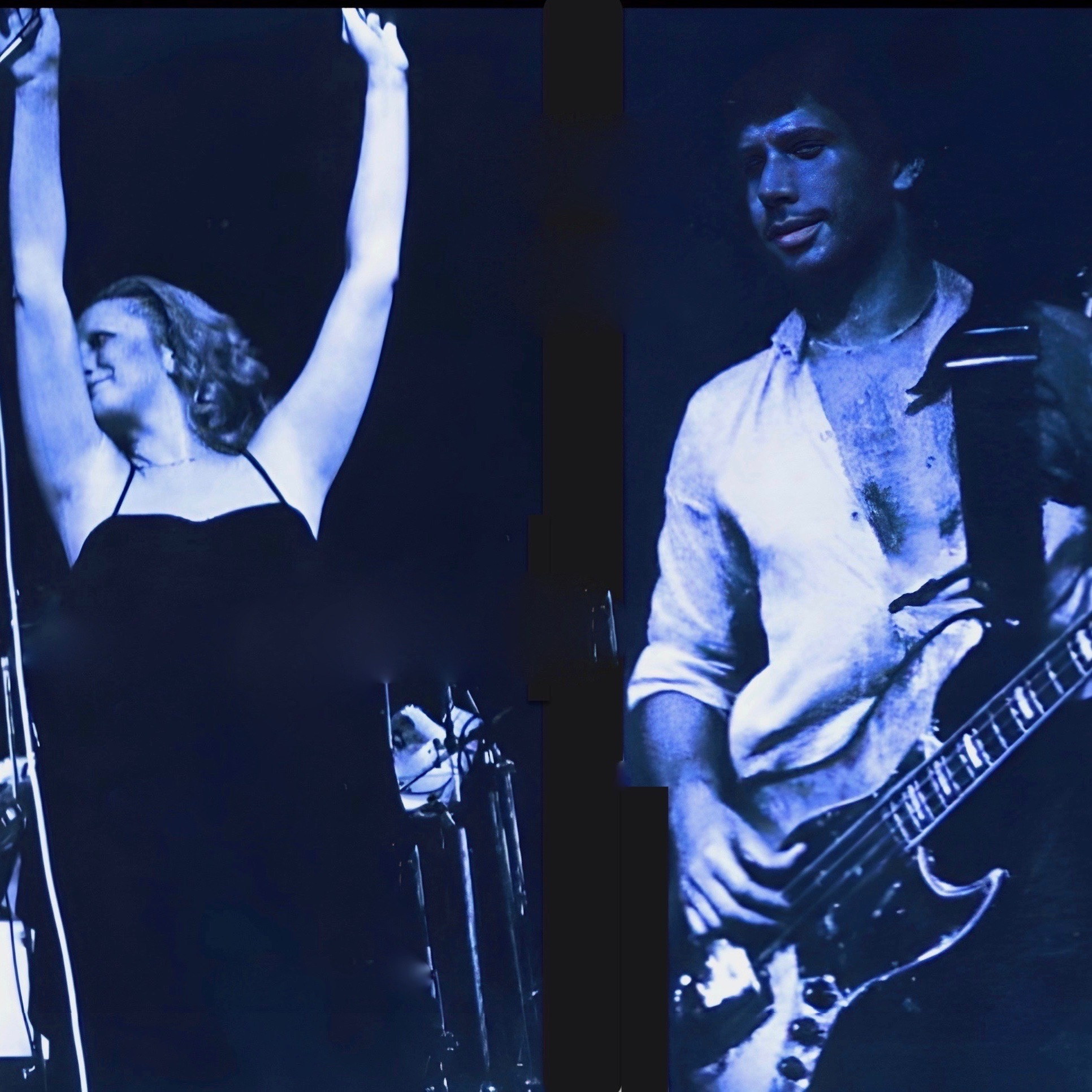
Presti participating in Mina's last public performances during summer 1978.

After backing Mina as a bass guitarist in the studio and on tour for many years, Pino Presti arranged and conducted many of her songs. He also backed her as a singer, as in "Flamingo" and other tracks. From 1971 up until her last public appearances at Bussoladomani in 1978, Presti arranged and conducted 86 of Mina's tracks, including the hits "Grande grande grande", "E penso a te", "L'importante è finire", "E poi", "Città vuota", "La pioggia di marzo", "Fiume azzurro", "Domenica sera" and others, and albums such as Mina, Cinquemilaquarantatre, Frutta e verdura, Amanti di valore, Baby Gate, La Mina, Singolare, Mina con bignè, Mina Live '78.

Presti composed four songs for Mina: "Tentiamo ancora", for the album Frutta e verdura (1973), "L'amore è un'altra cosa", for Mina® (1974), "Amante amore", for Mina con bignè (1977), and "Bignè", for Ridi pagliaccio (1988).

On Mina's come-back at the Bussoladomani theatre in Viareggio on 24 June 1978, Nantas Salvataggio wrote an enthusiastic review of the event in the Il Giorno newspaper: « Mina was accompanied by an orchestra as that of a grand Las Vegas show.

The Italian press, as well as others, described the concert as a "triumph" and underlined the contribution of the backing orchestra (14 members and the chorus), directed by Presti.

Between the 1970s and 1980s, he collaborated on recordings and or concerts with prominent personalities of the international music scene such as Wilson Pickett, Shirley Bassey, Quincy Jones, Gerry Mulligan, Ástor Piazzolla, Maynard Ferguson, Severino Gazzelloni, Franco Cerri, Shirley Bunnie Foy, Stéphane Grappelli, Aldemaro Romero, Tullio De Piscopo, Gianni Bedori, Eartha Kitt, Brian Auger, Lara Saint Paul, Bruno De Filippi, George Aghedo, Augusto Martelli, Enrico Intra, Ellade Bandini, Angel Pocho Gatti, Caterina Valente, Bill Conti, Hugo Heredia, and Maurice Vander.

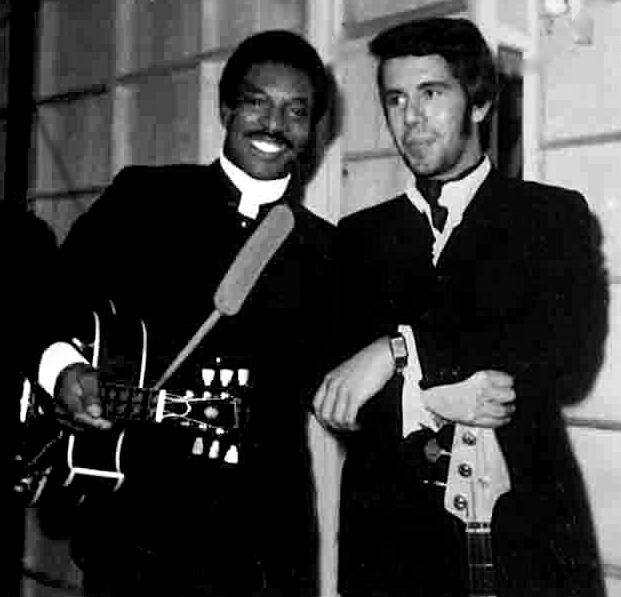
Pino Presti with Wilson Pickett

During the flight to Italy Wilson Pickett's bassist had been blocked at London airport and during the troublesome search for a substitute once he arrived in Sanremo, Pickett listened to me while I was playing with Brenton Wood; he blocked everyone and decided that I would be the bass player for him during the performance of the song "Un' Avventura", in competition at the Sanremo Music Festival. After the Festival, Wilson Pickett and the whole band also wanted me for the following European tour. – Pino Presti, during the Rai Tv show "Auditorio A"

He is listed under his real name, Giuseppe Prestipino, on the record Libertango with Ástor Piazzolla and in Summit by Ástor Piazzolla and Gerry Mulligan. He is listed under the name Giuseppe "Pino" Prestipino Giarritta on the records La Onda Máxima and Onda Nueva Instrumental by the Venezuelan pianist, composer, arranger Aldemaro Romero.

In April 1975 during the European tour with Mulligan and Piazzolla, he also played at the Olympia Theatre in Paris and at the World Music Festival in Palma, Majorca. The combo was composed by Gerry Mulligan (saxophone baritone), Ástor Piazzolla (bandoneón), Tom Fay (piano), Pino Presti (electric bass), Tullio De Piscopo (drums), Waldo de los Rios (organ), Sergio Farina (electric guitar). One set was for Gerry Mulligan, the second was dedicated to Ástor Piazzolla and the last one was the reunion of Astor and Gerry and the songs of this last set were those that had been issued on the LP Summit-Reunion Cumbre.

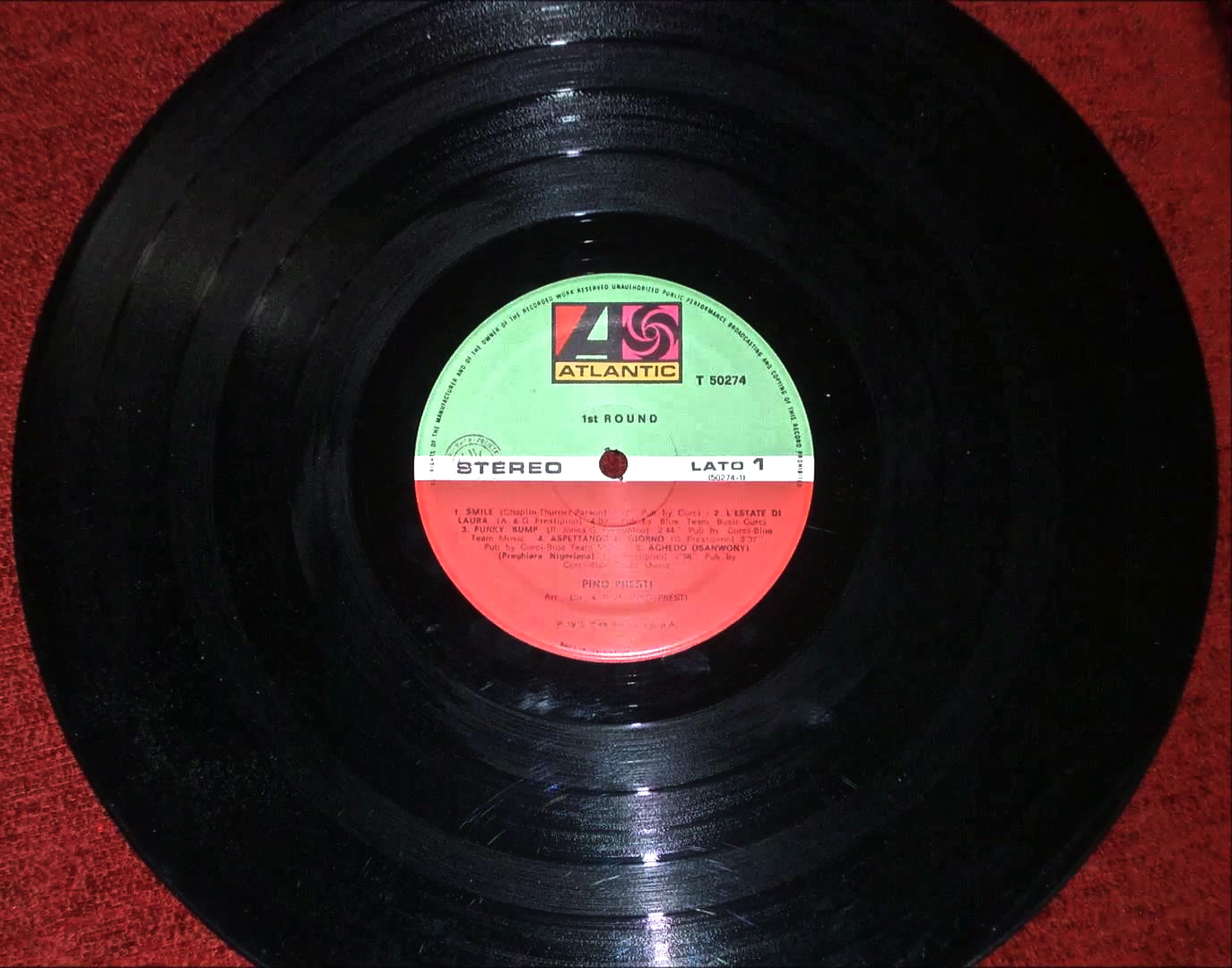
1st Round

In 1976 he created and produced for Atlantic Records the first dance-funk album in Italy: 1st round with hit songs such as Smile, Funky Bump, L'estate di Laura, Sunny.

In 1977 he signed a contract with RAI2 as arranger, conductor and composer of original music for the noted TV show, Auditorio A, directed by Stefano De Stefani. On that occasion, he was the conductor of a big band composed of 56 musicians with star names like: Gino Paoli, Sergio Endrigo, Milva, Pino Daniele, Maynard Ferguson, Angelo Branduardi, Rino Gaetano, Fausto Leali, Giorgio Baiocco, Banco del Mutuo Soccorso. Other top shows were: C'era due volte, directed by Enzo Trapani (1980) and Il cappello sulle ventitré, directed by Fernanda Turvani (1983).

Besides composing music for television series from the 1980s, Presti created and produced albums under various pseudonyms for renowned labels such as Polydor, Baby Records, Barclay, Edizioni Curci, Durium, Dischi Ricordi, Joker, as well as independent ones: Emergency Records, Soul Xpression, Level One, Self.

== 2000s onwards ==
Presti lived in France from 2004, and in 2009 created and produced the album, A La Costa Sud with 28 vocalists and/or instrumentalists who are from various continents and nations but who regularly perform in theatres and clubs in the French Riviera.

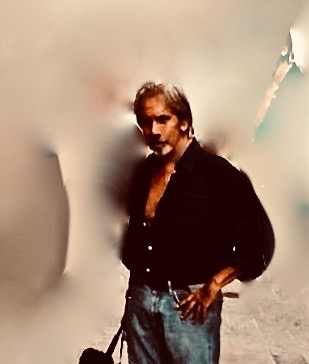
Pino Presti, August 2021

In 2011, he composed a five-hour soundtrack comprising music of different genres for Grand Heritage Hotel Group (and for its related media). These genres range from classic jazz, to nu jazz, bossanova, world music, and ambient music.

In 2013 Presti co-produced the tribute album Shirley Bunnie Foy, consisting of seventeen tracks performed by jazz vocalist Shirley Bunnie Foy in her 60 years career. The album includes such noted artists as The Dell-Tones, Tony Scott, Archie Shepp, Franco Cerri, Lou Bennett, among others.

In 2014 Presti composed, co-produced and released, under the pseudonym Mad of Jazz, the album Deep Colors, with the collaboration of keyboardists, synth programmers and composers Claudio and Andrea Calzolari.

In 2016 he composed the music for the 2016 advertising campaign of Scavolini, an Italian kitchen and bathroom products designer and manufacturer.

In 2019 he composed the music for the book (+Audio cd) "Eco nel vento", by Italian poet Tania Cantone. ISBN 978-88-94866-19-3

In May 2023, the vinyl album Pino Presti & Garden Planet - Sharade was released, also digitally uploaded on the main Streaming platforms.

In November 2024, a remastered version of the album 1st Round, was released and published on digital platforms by Planet Records.

On 6 February 2025 the compilation Soul Touches, produced by Pino Presti and distributed by Planet Distribution, is released and promoted in major digital stores.

On 25 March 2025, coinciding with the birthday of Mina, the project Mina Arranger Pino Presti: Finali Strumentali was released on major digital platforms.

On 15 November 2025 "Pino Presti, Geoff Bastow – Money (That's What I Want)" Remastered 2025 – Planet Distribution (2025) was published in digital format.

On 13 January 2026 the single "Pino Presti Astor Piazzolla - Libertango 1974" was released in digital format – Planet Distribution (2026). Open SpotifyApple MusicYouTube

== Martial arts ==
Presti trained in Shotokan karate and Goshindo under master Hiroshi Shirai from 1967 to 1985. He also trained on several occasions under other Japanese masters such as Taiji Kase, Hidetaka Nishiyama, Keinosuke Enoeda, Takeshi Naito, Hideo Ochi. He held a 5th degree black belt obtained in Rome, in 1987.

== Death ==
Presti died in 2026.

== Television shows ==
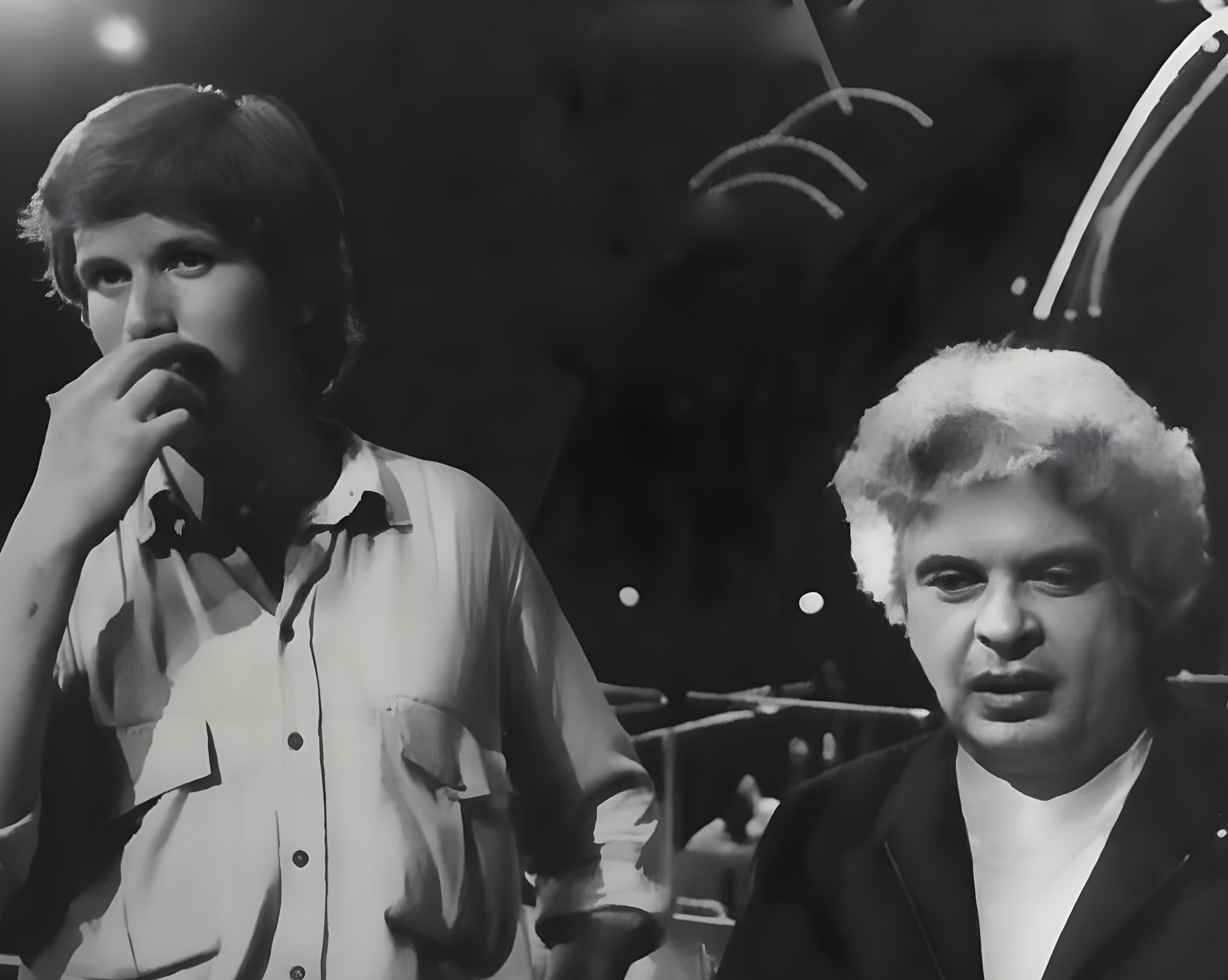
With Maynard Ferguson on Italian TV show "Auditorio A" (Rai-2, 1977)

- 1964 : Questo & Quello (Rai Uno) – Bassist, Singer (Hosted by Giorgio Gaber)
- 1965/1966 : Le Nostre Serate (Rai Due) – Bassist, Singer (Hosted by Giorgio Gaber)
- 1969 : Sanremo Festival (Rai Uno) – Bassist with Wilson Pickett
- 1977 : Auditorio A (Rai Due) – Composer, arranger, Conductor (Guest appearance by Maynard Ferguson).
- 1980 : C'era due volte (Rai Due) – Composer, arranger, Conductor (Guest appearances by Peter Tosh).
- 1983 : l Cappello sulle ventitré (Rai Due) – Composer, arranger, Conductor (Hosted by Gino Paoli)

== Discography (selected) ==
=== Albums ===
- 1st Round – Atlantic Records (1976)
- On The Lifeline – LCS (1985)
- Maja Andina – Saar Records (1990)
- A La Costa Sud – Edizioni Curci (2009)
- Café Ipanema 2011 – Rambling Records (2011)
- Shirley Bunnie Foy – MAP Golden Jazz (2013)
- Deep Colors – MAP/ Paper Moon (2014)
- Pino Presti & Garden Planet - Sharade – Private Recordings / Best Record Italy (2023) Juno
- 1st Round - Digital Remastered 2024 – Planet Records
- Soulful Touches - Planet Distribution (2025)

=== Singles ===
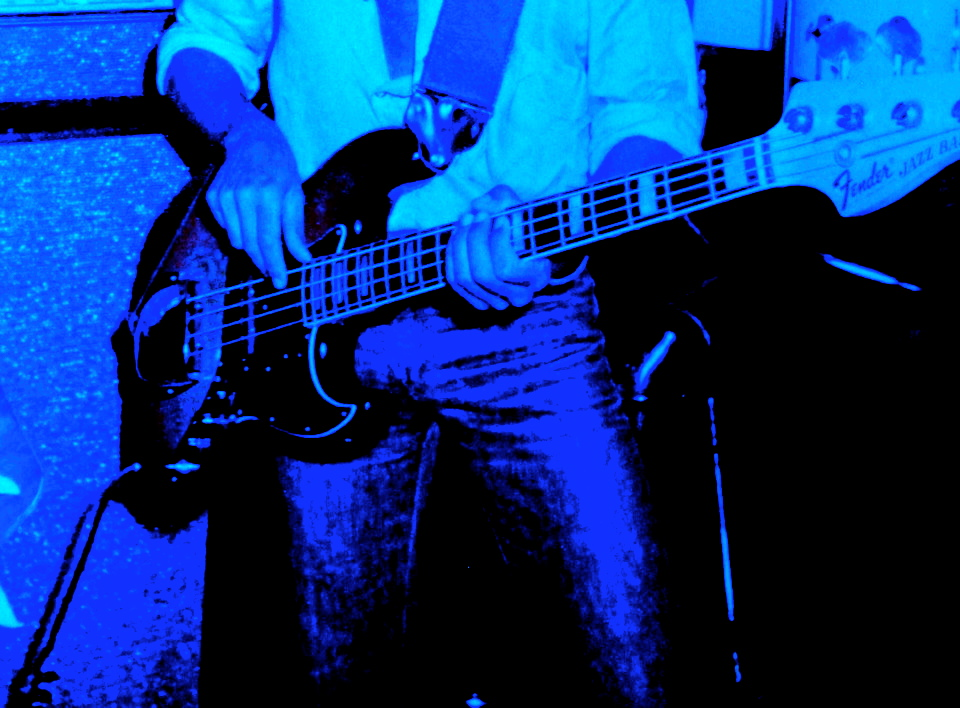
Pino Presti live with his 1971 FJB

- "Rimani ancora/Oh! Jenny" – Durium (1964)
- "In un posto fuori dal mondo/Messaggio d'amore" – Belldisc (1969)
- "Karin/No sabe" – Dischi Ricordi (1970)
- "Smile/L'estate di Laura" – Atlantic Records (1975)
- "Funky Bump/C.so Buenos Ayres" – Atlantic Records (1976)
- "Shitân Disco Shitân" – Barclay (1977)
- "Sundown" – Durium (1978)
- "You Know The Way part I/You Know The Way part II" – Baby Records (1979)
- "You Know The Way" – Vinyl 12" 33 ⅓ RPM – Emergency Records (1980)
- "Money (That What I Want)" – Vinyl 12" 33 ⅓ RPM – Baby Records (1980)
- "To Miami/Mama's Away" – Cetra Records (1980)
- "Dancing Nights/And I Love Her" – Polydor Records (1983)
- "Ya No Puedo Vivir (The Bush Remixes)" – Vinyl 12" 33 ⅓ RPM – Blow Up Disco (1991)
- "Once Again Now" – Vinyl 12" 33 ⅓ RPM – Soul Xpression (1992)
- "Divine" – Vinyl 12" 33 ⅓ RPM – Level One (2001)
- "Feel Like a Woman" – CD Single – Self (2005)
- "Jazz Carnival" – CD Single – Map (2015)
- "Funky Bump" (Unreleased Original Extended Version)/"Funky Bump" (Original 7" Version) – Best Record Italy (2015)
- "Disco Shitân" (Long version) – Best Record Italy (2015)
- "You Know The Way" (Disco Version by Tee Scott) – Best Record Italy (2016)
- "To Africa / Soul Makossa" (EP) – Best Record Italy (2017)
- "Pino Presti Featuring Roxy Robinson: You know Why" (EP) – Best Record Italy (2018)
- "Lookin’For" (Digital version) – Edizioni Curci (2018)
- "Stefano Ritteri feat. Pino Presti: Come Back To Me" (EP) – Spaziale Recordings (2020)
- "Mina Arranger Pino Presti: Finali Strumentali" (EP) – Planet Distribution (2025)
- "Pino Presti, Geoff Bastow – Money (That's What I Want)" Remastered 2025 – Planet Distribution (2025)
- "Pino Presti, Astor Piazzolla - Libertango 1974" – Planet Distribution (2026)
- "Be Still My Beating Heart (Jazz cover)" – Planet Distribution (2026)

== As performer, arranger, conductor on other artists' albums ==
- Mina – Artist: Mina – PDU (1971)
- Cinquemilaquarantatre – Artist: Mina – PDU (1972)
- Altro – Artist: Mina – PDU (1972)
- Del mio meglio n. 2 – Artist: Mina – PDU (1973)
- Frutta e verdura – Artist: Mina- PDU (1973)
- Amanti di valore – Artist: Mina – PDU (1973)
- Mina – Artist: Mina – PDU (1974)
- Baby Gate – Artist: Mina – PDU (1974)
- Aulehla & Zappa – Artist: Aulehla & Zappa – PDU (1974)
- Del mio meglio n. 3 – Artist: Mina – PDU (1975)
- La Mina – Artist: Mina – PDU (1975)
- Singolare – Artist: Mina – PDU (1976)
- Del mio meglio n. 4 – Artist: Mina – PDU (1977)
- Mina con Bignè – Artist: Mina – PDU (1977)
- Minantologia – Artist: Mina – PDU (1977)
- You Know Why – Artist: Roxy Robinson – OUT (1977)
- Di tanto in tanto – Artist: Mina – PDU (1978)
- Mina Live '78 – Artist: Mina – PDU (1978)
- In Due – Artist: Wess and Dori Ghezzi – Durium (1979)
- Filipponio – Artist: Filipponio – Cetra Records (1980)
- Del mio meglio n. 6 Live – Artist: Mina – PDU (1981)
- Il Flauto d'oro – Artist: Severino Gazzelloni – PDU (1983)
- All'arrembaggio – Artist: Filipponio – Spice7 (1984)
- Del mio meglio n. 8 – Artist: Mina – PDU (1985)
- Del mio meglio n. 9 – Artist: Mina – PDU (1987)
- Oggi ti amo di più – Artist: Mina – PDU (1988)
- Ridi pagliaccio – Artist: Mina – PDU (1988)
- Mazzini canta Battisti – Artist: Mina – PDU (1994)
- Mina Studio Collection – Artist: Mina – PDU (1998)
- Mina Love Collection – Artist: Mina – PDU (2000)
- Colección Latina – Artist: Mina – PDU (2001)
- The Platinum Collection – Artist: Mina – PDU (2004)
- Platinum Collection 2 – Artist: Mina – PDU (2006)
- The Best of Platinum Collection – Artist: Mina – EMI Records (2007)
- Je suis Mina – Artist: Mina – EMI Records (2011)
- Yo soy Mina – Artist: Mina – EMI Records (2011)
- I am Mina – Artist: Mina – EMI Records (2011)
- The Collection 3.0 – Artist: Mina – Warner Music (2015)
- Tutte le migliori – Artist: Mina – Clan/PDU (2017)
- Paradiso (Lucio Battisti Songbook) – Artist: Mina – PDU (2018)
- Mina Live alla Bussola 1968-1978 – Artist: Mina – Warner Music (2024)

== As performer ==
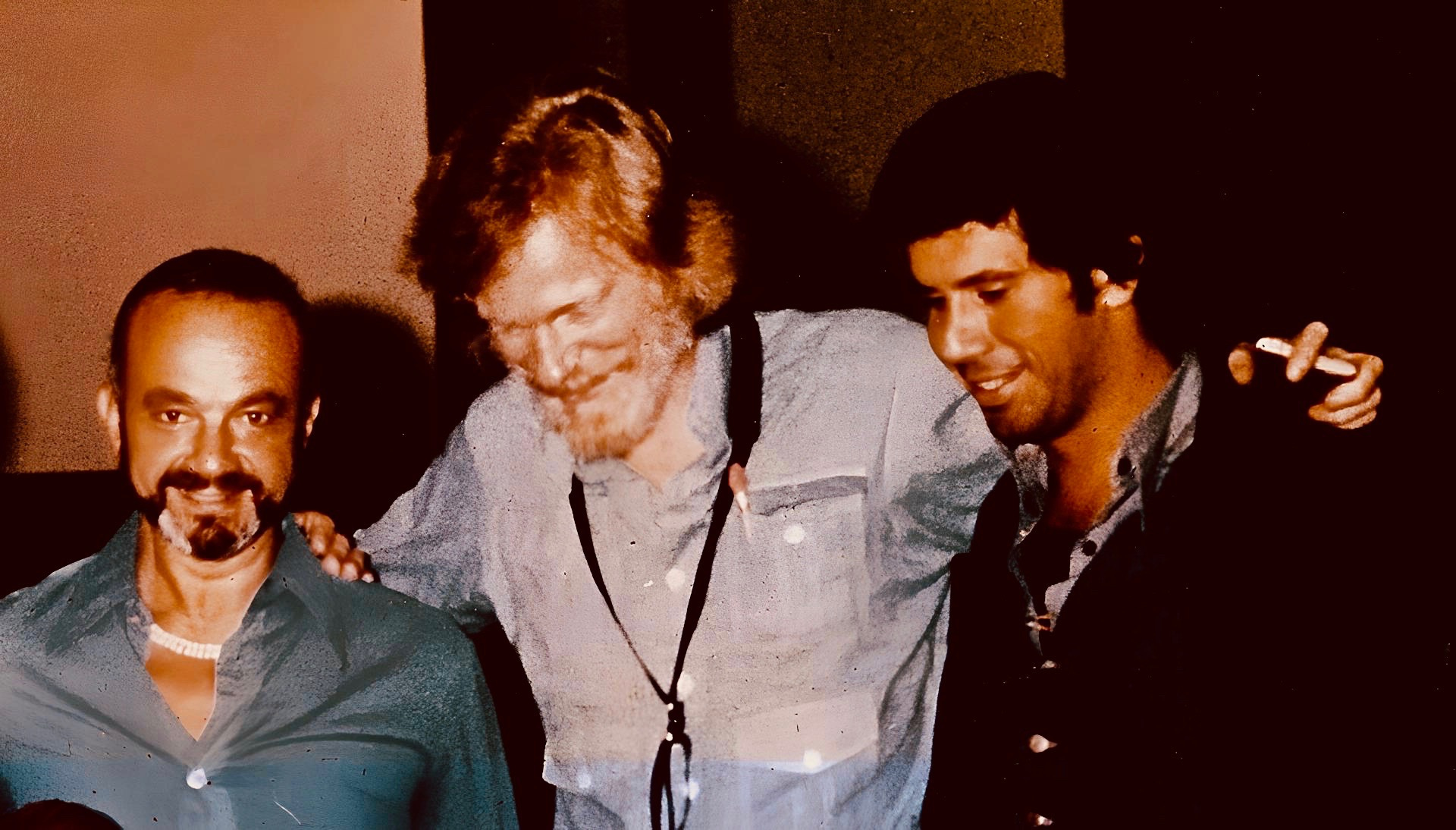
Pino Presti with Gerry Mulligan and Ástor Piazzolla at the Summit recording, 1974

- 12 Bacchette per una chitarra – Artist: Franco Cerri – gta (1966)
- Stereo Beat – Artist: Angel Pocho Gatti – CAR .JB. CRJLP 00011 (1967)
- Dedicato a mio padre – Artist: Mina – PDU (1967)
- This Is My Life – Artist: Shirley Bassey – United Artists (1968)
- Mina alla Bussola dal vivo – Artist: Mina – PDU (1968)
- Love and more Love – Artist: Puccio Roelens – Vedette Records (1969)
- L'orchestra di Augusto Martelli dal vivo – Artist: Augusto Martelli – PDU (1969)
- Quando tu mi spiavi in cima a un batticuore – Artist: Mina – PDU (1970)
- Del mio meglio – Artist: Mina – PDU (1971)
- La Onda Máxima – Artist: Aldemaro Romero – Antor (1972)
- Black Sound From White People – Artist: Augusto Martelli – Fontana Records (1972)
- Fratelli La Bionda s.r.l. – Artist: La Bionda – Dischi Ricordi (1972)
- Metti una sera Cerri – Artist: Franco Cerri – Jazz Italiano-Music (1973)
- Dal mio lontano – Artist: Renato Pareti – Ducale (1973)
- The Real McCoy – Artist: Augusto Martelli – Aguamanda (1974)
- Libertango – Artist: Ástor Piazzolla – Carosello (1974)
- Summit – Artist: Gerry Mulligan, Ástor Piazzolla – erre-t-v (1974)
- Gerry Mulligan meets Enrico Intra – Artist: Gerry Mulligan, Enrico Intra – Produttori Associati (1975)
- Lumière / Suite Troileana – Artist: Ástor Piazzolla – Carosello (1976)
- Onda Nueva Instrumental – Artist: Aldemaro Romero – Velvet Música (1976)
- Silence and Other Sounds – Artist: Roxy Robinson – ONE (1977)
- Dissonanza-Consonanza – Artist: Enrico Intra – Musica Jazz (1999)
- Circle – Artist: Pérez Prado (re-edit) – Schema (2013)
- Escandalo – Artist: Pérez Prado – (re-edit) – Schema (2014)
- Love Child – Artist: Pérez Prado / Don Alfio – (re-edit) – Schema (2014)

== As performer, arranger, conductor on other artists' singles ==
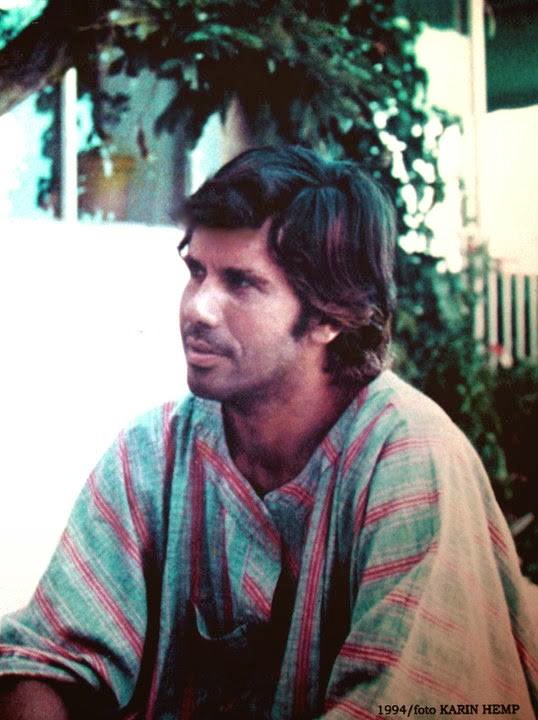
Pino Presti, Positano 1994 Photograph by Karin Hemp

- "Grande grande grande" – Artist: Mina – PDU (1971)
- "Domenica sera" – Artist: Mina – PDU (1973)
- "E poi..." – Artist: Mina – PDU (1973)
- "Lamento d'amore" – Artist: Mina – PDU (1973)
- "La scala buia" – Artist: Mina – PDU (1974)
- "L'importante è finire" – Artist: Mina – PDU (1975)
- "Nuda" – Artist: Mina – PDU (1976)
- "Città vuota (It's a Lonely Town)" – Artist: Mina – PDU (1978)
- "Dentro" – Artist: Beba Lončar – CBS Records (1978)
- "Momento" – Artist: Wess & Dori Ghezzi – Durium (1979)
- "Pazzo non-amore mio/L'Unica" – Artist: Filipponio – Cetra Records (1979)
- "Regina del futuro/Noia" – Artist: Marisa Sacchetto – F1 Team (1981)
- "Quale appuntamento" – Artist: Eleonora Giorgi – Dischi Ricordi (1981)

== As performer ==
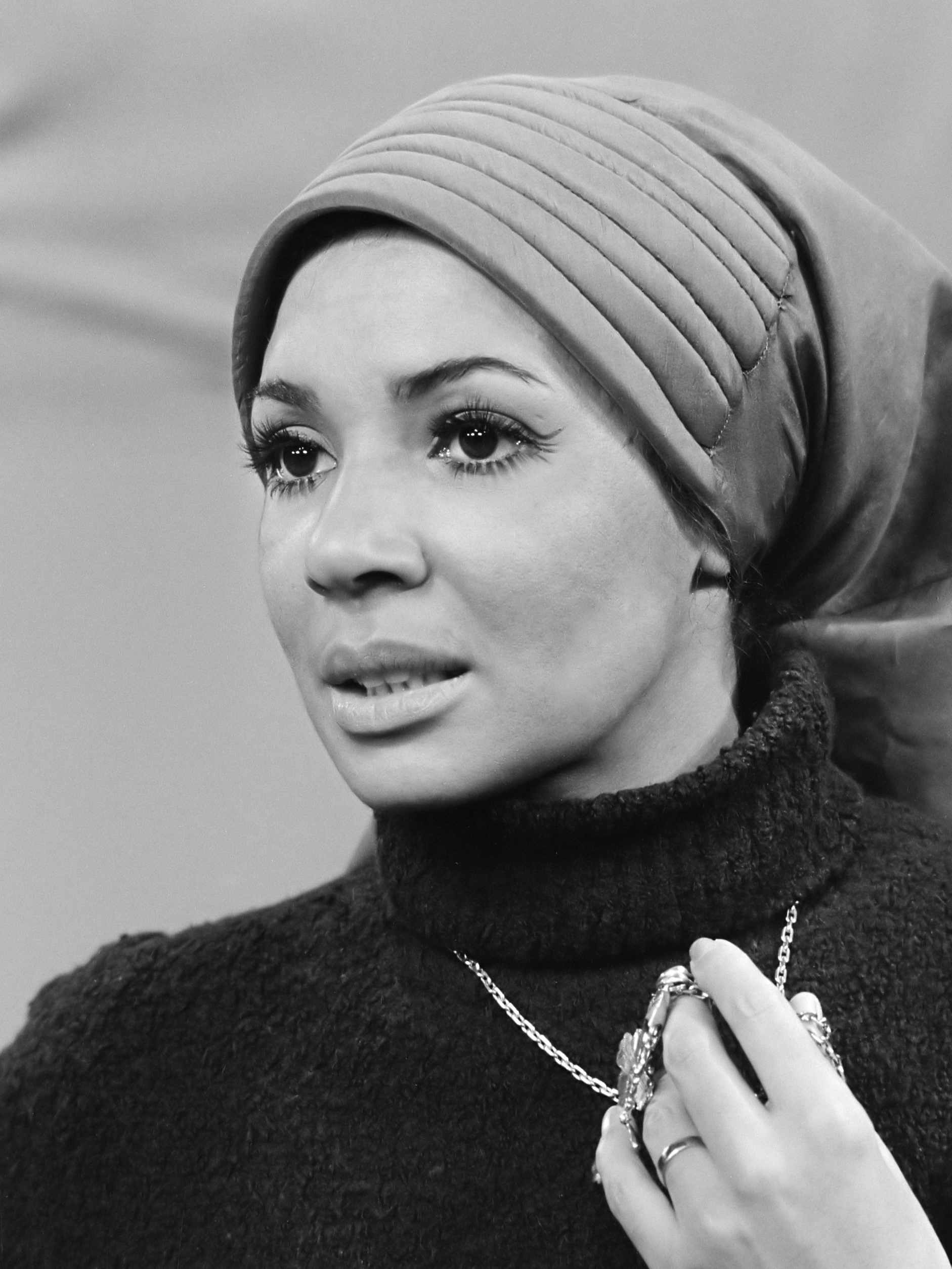
From 1968 to 1970 Presti performed with Shirley Bassey on eight singles and on the album This Is My Life

=== Only collaborations for international projects ===
- "Cara Fatina/Lettera a Pinocchio" – Artist: Tony Renis, arranger-conductor Quincy Jones – Philips Records (1964)
- "Che vale per me/Eccomi" – Artist: Eartha Kitt – RCA (1968)
- "La vita/Without A Word" – Artist: Shirley Bassey – United Artists (1968)
- "Domani domani/Pronto sono io" – Artist: Shirley Bassey – United Artists (1968)
- "Yes/To Give" – Artist: Shirley Bassey – United Artists (1968)
- "E' giorno/If You Go Away" – Artist: Shirley Bassey – United Artists (1968)
- "Chi si vuole bene come noi/Epirops" – Artist: Shirley Bassey – United Artists (1968)
- "Com'è piccolo il mondo/Manchi solo tu" – Artist: Shirley Bassey – United Artists (1968)
- "Concerto d'autunno/You Are My Way Of Life" – Artist: Shirley Bassey – United Artists (1969)
- "Ora che sei qui/Something" – Artist: Shirley Bassey – United Artists (1970)
- "Na Na Hey Hey Kiss Him Goodbye" – Artist: Patrick Samson – Carosello Records (1970)
- "Non preoccuparti/Adesso ricomincerei" – Artist: Lara Saint Paul, arranger-conductor Quincy Jones – Polydor (1973)
- "Cara Fatina" (re-edit) -Tony Renis / Quincy Jones – His Master's Voice (1983)

== Music video ==
In December 2023, is published on YouTube the music video "Pino Presti - Incontri di valore" (1:30 length) containing, in addition to some compositions performed by Presti himself, several of his collaborations made over the years with notable artists such as Mina, Astor Piazzolla, Gerry Mulligan Shirley Bassey, Franco Cerri, Aldemaro Romero, Enrico Intra, Augusto Martelli, Roxy Robinson + the bonus track "Nessuno mi può giudicare" sung by Caterina Caselli. The video, although not made for commercial purposes, attracted the interest of the online music daily Rockol, which included it with a feature article among its news of the week.

== See also ==
- List of music arrangers
- List of jazz musicians
- List of jazz bassists

== Bibliography ==
- Mina, storia di un Mito raccontato, by Nino Romano, Rusconi pub., ISBN 978-8818120448, 1986
- Autori Vari (a cura di Gino Castaldo), Dizionario della canzone italiana, Curcio pub., 1990
- Mina, Mito e Mistero, by Nino Romano, Sperling & Kupfer pub., ISBN 88-200-2298-2, 1996
- Mina, i mille volti di una voce, by Romy Padoano, Arnoldo Mondadori pub., ISBN 978-8804447726, 1998
- Divina Mina, by Dora Giannetti, Zelig pub., ISBN 88-86471-72-6, 1998
- The Jazz Discography, by Tom Lord, The Thomas Lord pub., 2009 (Musician list)
- The Gerry Mulligan Collection, by Craig Hanley, Barnes & Noble pub.
- Knight Library's Jazz Collection, by Douglas Room, UO Libraries pub., 2009
- 1000 concerti che ci hanno cambiato la vita, by Ezio Guaitamacchi, Rizzoli pub., ISBN 978-8817042222, 2010
- Franco Califano. Non escludo il ritorno, by Salvatore Coccoluto, Imprimatur pub. - Interview with Pino Presti ISBN 978-88-6830-181-1, 2014
- Astor Piazzolla, by María Susana Azzi, Editorial El Ateneo pub., ISBN 978-950-02-0953-3, 2018
- La Storia dalla Disco Music, by Andrea Angeli Bufalini / Giovanni Savastano, Hoepli pub., ISBN 978-8820382681, 2019
- Mina, Una Voce Universale, by Luca Cerchiari, Mondadori, ISBN 978-8804724599, 2020
- Night fever: Les 100 hits qui ont fait le disco, by Belkacem Meziane, Le Mot et le reste pub., ISBN 9782361392215, 2020
- Astor Piazzolla - Una vita per la musica, by Maria Susana Azzi, Sillabe pub., ISBN 9788833402260, 2021
- Tecnica e linguaggio del bassista - Il basso elettrico e i bassisti, by Paolo Costa, Lorenzo Poli, Attilio Zanchi; Dantone Music pub., ISBN 978-8863888331, 2021
