= Enrico Intra =

Italian jazz musician (born 1935)

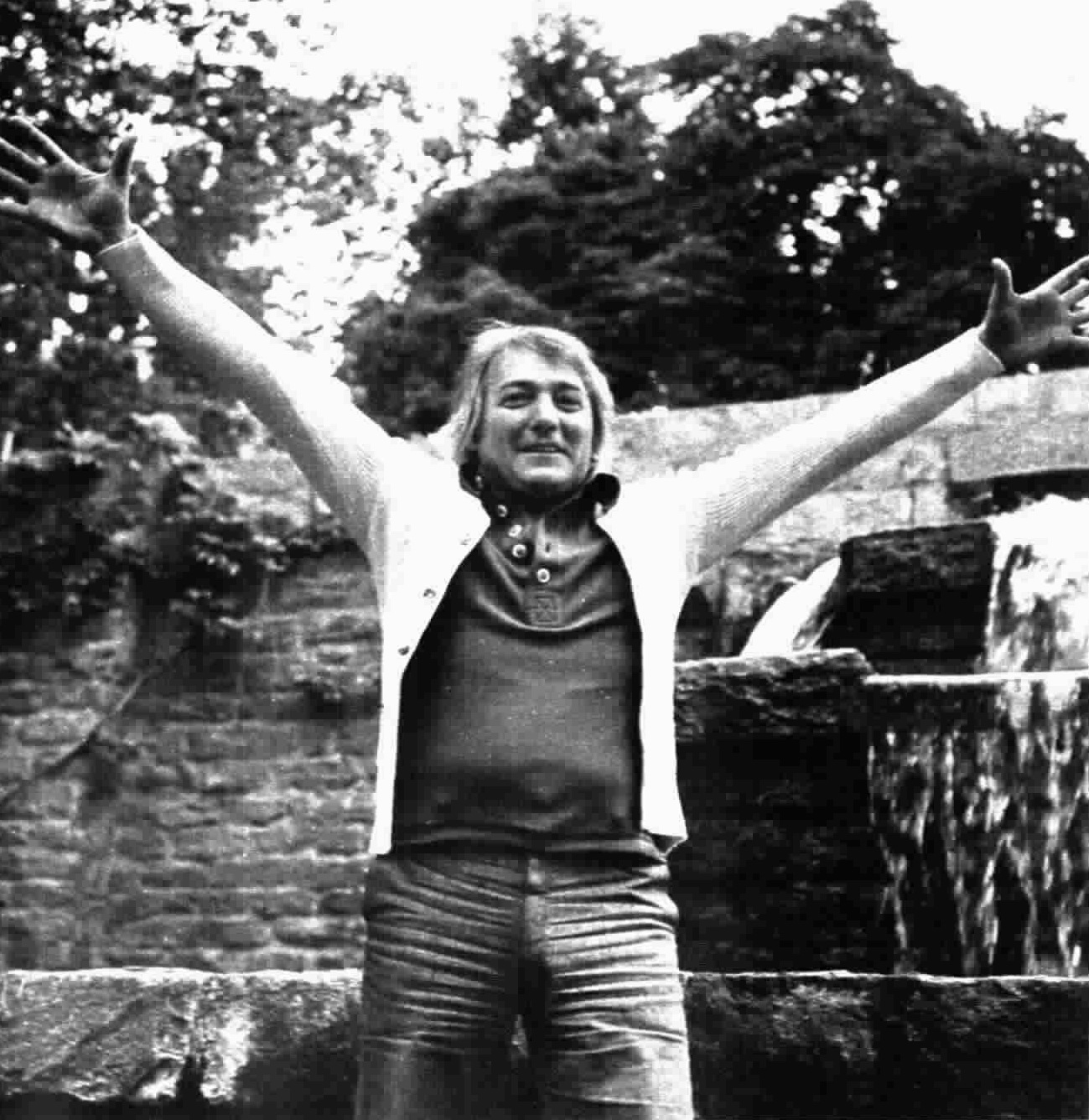
- Intra in 1975

Background information
- Born: 3 July 1935 (age 90); Milan, Italy
- Genres: Jazz, pop
- Occupations: Pianist, composer, conductor
- Instrument: Piano

Enrico Intra (born 3 July 1935) is an Italian jazz pianist, composer, conductor.

During his long career, Intra has collaborated with such notable musicians as Gerry Mulligan, Franco Cerri, Lee Konitz, Milton Jackson, Severino Gazzelloni, Pino Presti, Tullio De Piscopo, David Liebman and others.

== Works ==
- La Messa d'Oggi Ri-Fi RFL ST 14043, 1971
- Archetipo (Suite for Sextet with Violoncello and Oboe)
- Contro la seduzione
- Dissonanza-Consonanza
- The Blues
- Nosferatu
- Bach-Cage-Intra
- Nuova Civiltà
- Nicole

== Discography ==
- To the Victims of Vietnam, Ri-Fi, 1974
- Gerry Mulligan meets Enrico Intra, with Pino Presti and Tullio De Piscopo, Produttori Associati, 1976
- The Blues, CD, Album, Dire, 1991
- Wach im Dunklen Garten. Instrumentalmusik nach Gregorianischen Gesängen Kreuz, CD, 1999
- Bernstein/Gershwin/Rodgers, with the Civica Jazz Band and Franco Cerri, Soul Note, CD, 2000
- Live!, Distr. IRD, CD, 2005
- Le case di Berio, Audio CD, Album, Rai Trade, Alfa Music, 2005
- Like Monk, Alfa Music, Audio CD, 2006
- Franco Cerri & Enrico Intra Jazz Italiano Live 2007, MAG 2007
- David Liebman/Enrico Intra Liebman meets Intra Contenuto Alfa Music, CD, 2008
- Franco Ambrosetti/Enrico Intra Live In Milan, Duo, Trio, Quartet, CD, Album, Albore Jazz, 2009
- Gregoriani & Spirituals, Alfa Music, Audio CD, 2018
