= Franco Cerri =

Italian guitarist (1926–2021)

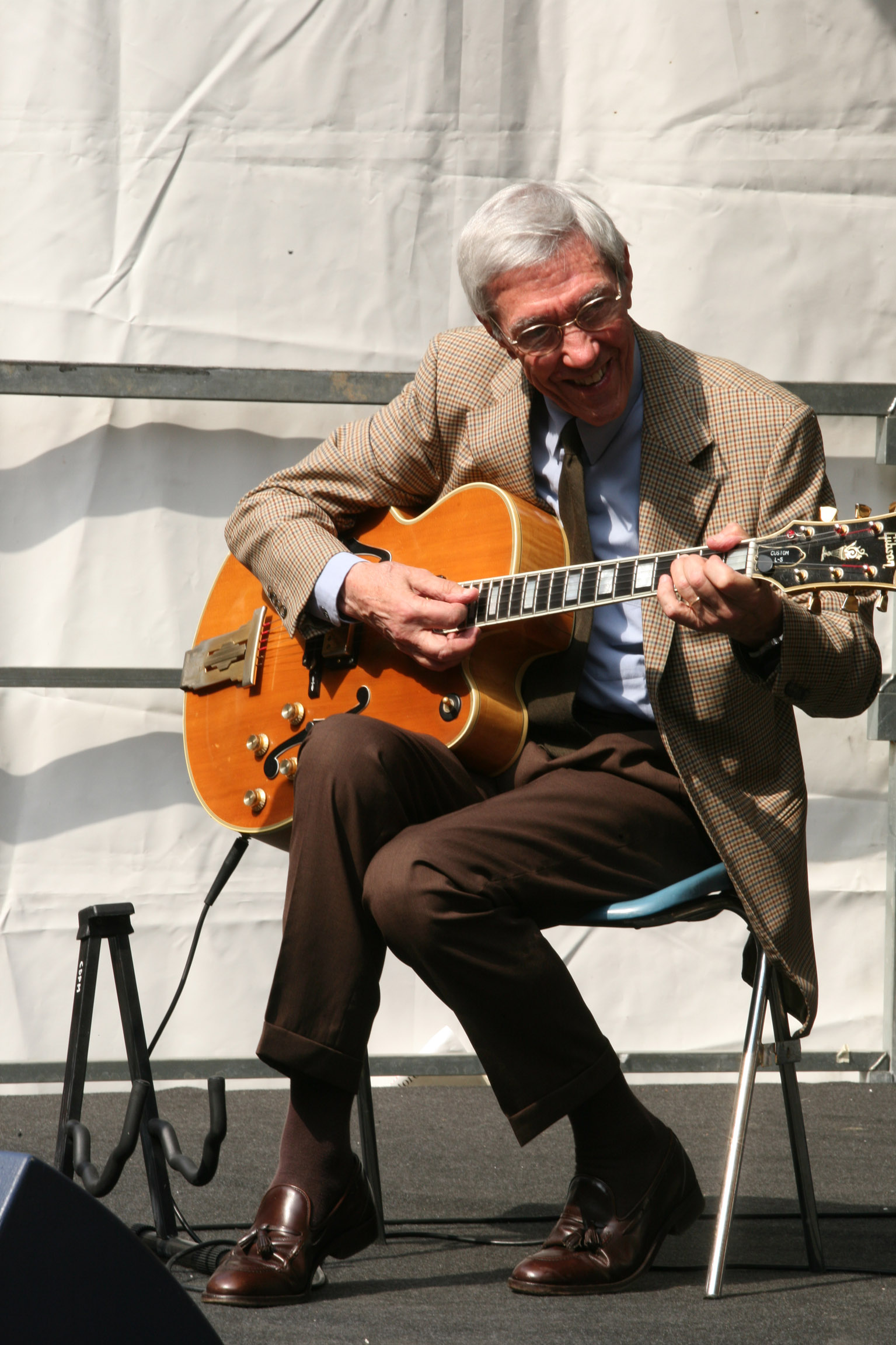
- Cerri in Milan, Italy, in 2008

Background information
- Born: 29 January 1926; Milan, Italy
- Died: 18 October 2021 (aged 95) Milan
- Genres: Jazz
- Occupation: Musician
- Instrument(s): Guitar, double bass
- Years active: 1945–20??

Franco Cerri (29 January 1926 – 18 October 2021) was an Italian guitarist and double bassist.

== Biography ==
Cerri was born in Milan and learned to play guitar when he was 17. In 1945 he became a member of the group led by Gorni Kramer and joined the orchestra of the television show Buone vacanze. He played double bass in addition to guitar starting in the 1950s, such as with Chet Baker and Buddy Collette. He has also played with Dizzy Gillespie, Johnny Griffin, Stéphane Grappelli, Lars Gullin, Billie Holiday, Lee Konitz, Gerry Mulligan, Lou Bennett, Bud Shank, Tony Scott, Django Reinhardt, Phil Woods, and the Modern Jazz Quartet. He cited as influences Django Reinhardt, Barney Kessell, and René Thomas.

Cerri has led quartets and quintets with Tullio De Piscopo, Pino Presti, Gianluigi Trovesi, Flavio Ambrosetti, and Jean-Luc Ponty.

In 1980, he formed a duo with pianist Enrico Intra, with whom he founded the "Civica Scuola di Jazz" in Milan.

On 1 January 2006, he was knighted by President Carlo Azeglio Ciampi.

Cerri died on 18 October 2021, at the age of 95.

== Discography ==
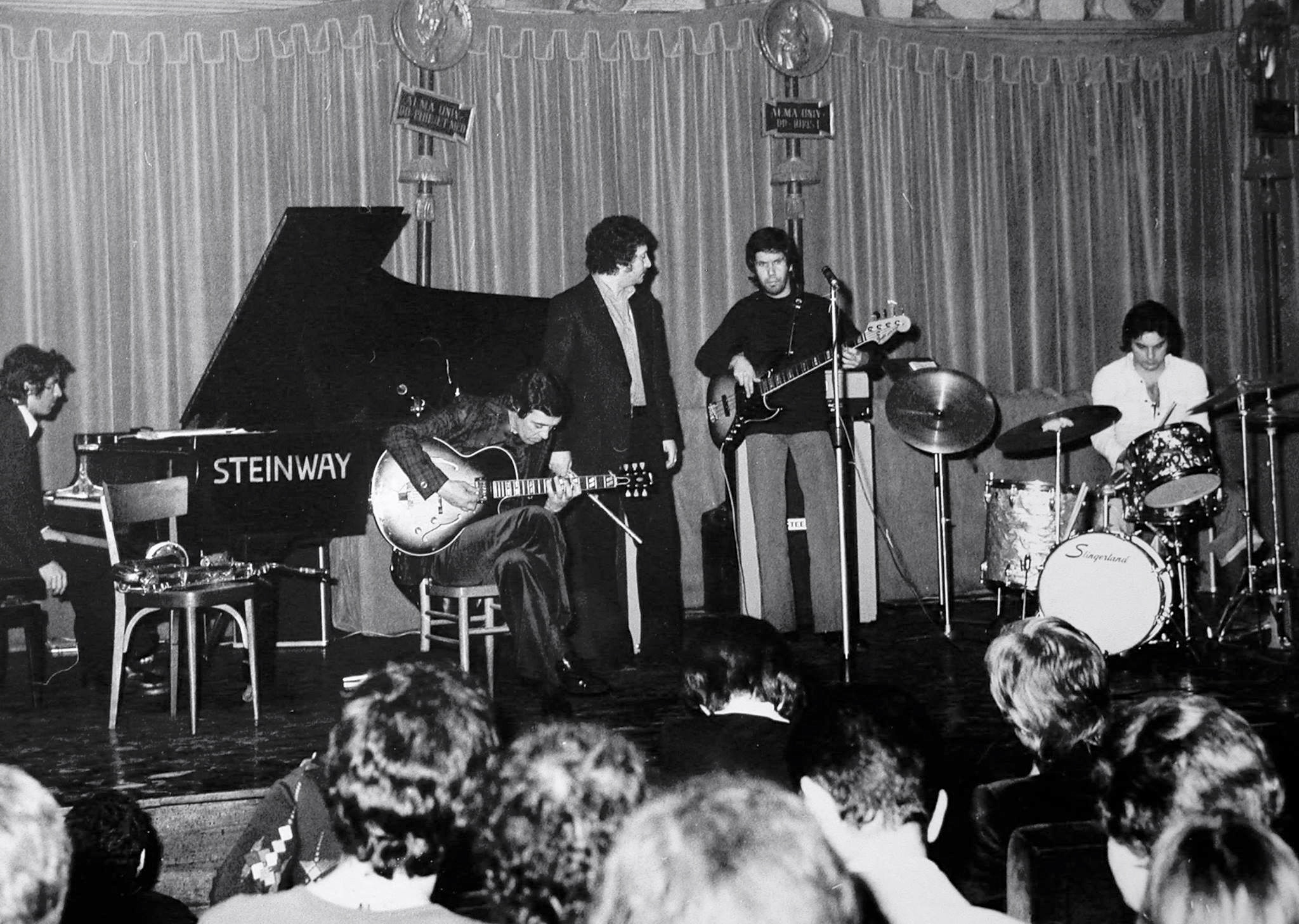
The Franco Cerri quintet 1973: Nando De Luca, Franco Cerri, Giorgio Baiocco, Pino Presti, Tullio De Piscopo

=== As leader ===
- Franco Cerri and His European Jazz Stars (Columbia, 1960)
- International Jazz Meeting (Columbia, 1961)
- Bossa Nova (Columbia, 1963)
- Franco Cerri (Columbia, 1964)
- La Sera a Casa Con Te (CGD, 1965)
- 12 Bacchette Per 1 Chitarra (GTA, 1966)
- 6 (Dire, 1971)
- Metti Una Sera Cerri (1973)
- A Limmen (Malobbia, 1975)
- From Cathetus to Cicero (Malobbia, 1975)
- Querce Platani e Cerri (PDU, 1975)
- Franco Tony and Pompeo (Malobbia, 1976)
- Nuages (Ricordi, 1976)
- Uno Suo Modo Di Dire (Dire, 1977)
- Franco Cerri Jazz (Dire, 1977)
- Noi Duero (Malobbia, 1978)
- Demoiselle (Dire, 1979)
- Omaggio a Bill Evans (Dire, 1981)
- Effetto Alfa (Paragon, 1983)
- Today! (Dire, 1984)
- From: Milan to: Frankfurt/Main Re: Jazz Twins (Dire, 1985)
- Pregiata Ditta Dal 1980 (Ariston, 1990)
- Cerri & Cerri (Dire, 1994)
- En Souvenir De Milan (CDpM LION, 1995)
- In Punta Di Cerri (MAP, 2000)
- Jazz Italiano Live 2007 (Casa Del Jazz, 2007)
- Cerrimedioatutto (MAP, 2011)
- Passavo Di Qui (Musica Jazz, 2012)
- Barber Shop (Abeat, 2014)
- Antonio Onorato & Franco Cerri (Abeat, 2016)
- Take the A Train with Gianni Basso (VideoRadio, 2008)
- E Venia Da' Campi Che Di Cerri Sentia (Red, 2008)

=== As sideman ===
With Chet Baker

- In Milan (Jazzland, 1960)
- Chet Baker with Fifty Italian Strings (Jazzland, 1960)
- Stella by Starlight (West Wind, 1989)

With Bruno Lauzi

- Palla Al Centro (Numero Uno 1983)
- Back to Jazz (Dire, 1989)
- Lauzi Cantava Il Jazz (Musica Jazz, 2016)

With others

- Nicola Arigliano, Go Man! (NuN, 2001)
- Basso-Valdambrini, New Sound from Italy (Jolly Hi-Fi, 1960)
- Matteo Brancaleoni, Just Smile (Philology, 2007)
- Buddy Collette, Polyhedric Buddy Collette (Dejavu, 2008)
- Milt Jackson, Sings with the Enrico Intra Group (seriE.WOC, 2013)
- Renato Rascel, Ninna Nanna Del Cavallino/E Arrivata La Bufera (Odeon, 1958)
- Caterina Valente, A Briglia Sciolta (Ariston, 1990)
- Claude Williamson, Modern Jazz in Nude (Columbia, 1968)
