= Oscar Valdambrini =

Italian trumpeter

Oscar Valdambrini (May 11, 1924, Turin, Italy – December 26, 1997, Rome) was an Italian jazz trumpeter, and flugelhornist. According to The New Grove, he "had a central role in the emergence of a modern jazz movement in Italy".

Valdambrini's professional career began in the late 1940s, when he played with Rex Stewart and, in 1955, co-led a small ensemble with Gianni Basso. Valdambrini's association with Basso would continue through the early 1960s. He also arranged and played as a sideman for Armando Trovajoli toward the end of the 1950s. In the 1960s, he played with Gil Cuppini, Duke Ellington, and Giorgio Gaslini, and in the early 1970s worked with Maynard Ferguson.

He performed again with Basso from 1972 to 1974, and played in the 1970s with Franco Ambrosetti, Conte Candoli, Dusko Goykovich, Freddie Hubbard, Mel Lewis, Frank Rosolino, Ernie Wilkins, and Kai Winding. He suffered from increasingly poor health from the middle of the 1980s, and receded from active performance.
