= Hoàng Quyên =

Vietnamese singer

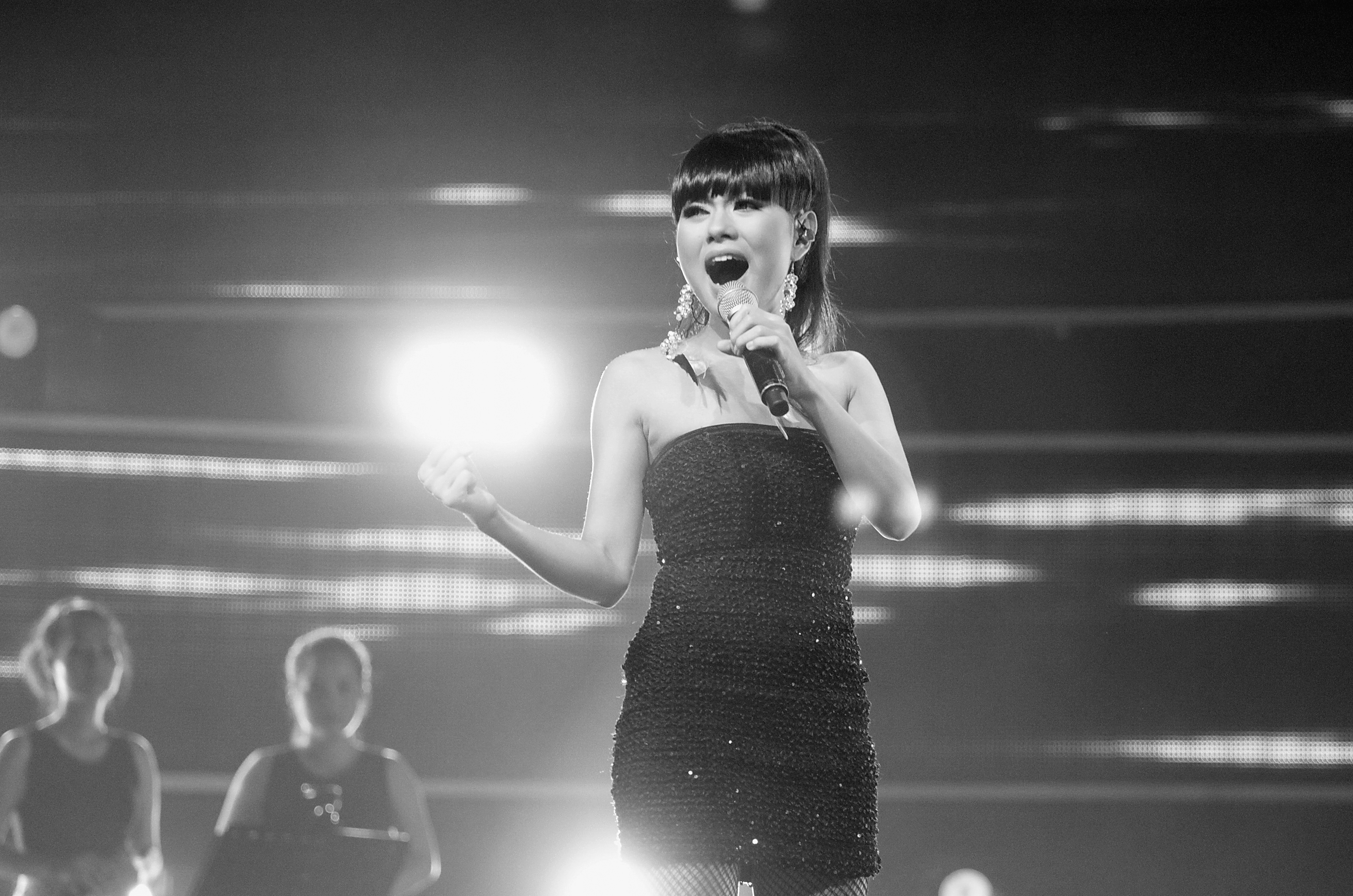
Hoàng Quyên in 2012

Hoàng Lệ Quyên (born 19 October 1992) is a Vietnamese singer who became known from Vietnam Idol season 4.
