= Jean-Sébastien Simonoviez =

Jean-Sebastien Simonoviez
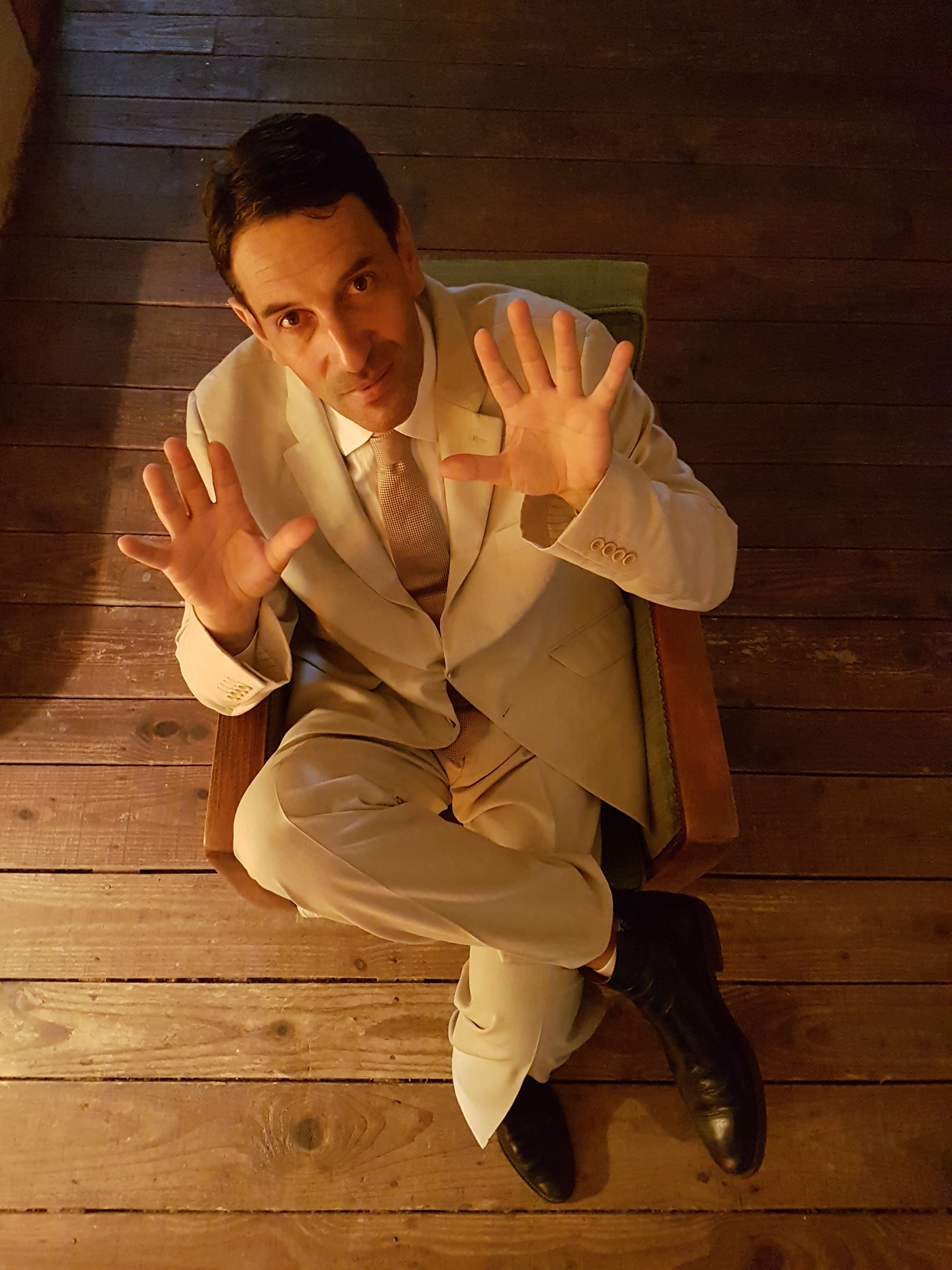

Background information
- Born: 1966 (age 59–60); Caen, France
- Genres: Jazz
- Instruments: Piano, trumpet, drums

Jean-Sebastien Simonoviez (born 1966) is a French multi-instrumentalist, composer, author and arranger.

== Biography ==
Jean-Sébastien Simonoviez was born from a music-loving father and an amateur pianist mother's family.

From the age of 5, he begins to study classical piano with an “old school” teacher. At 7 years old, he joins a music school in which he is suggested to choose a second instrument (the trumpet). Until the age of 14, he absorbed the fundamental techniques of music (reading, writing, theory). From 16 years old, he starts playing with other musicians.

In 1989, he records André Jaume's disc "Standards" with Olivier Clerc and François Méchali for the label CELP. He toured across France with a guitarist who introduced him to harmony according to Jef Gilson, whom he would later meet in person

During the 1990s, he takes part in numerous projects (concerts and recordings, with European musicians such as JP Llabador, Denis Fournier, Fred Monino, Jean-René Dalerci, Joël Allouche, Doudou Gouirand, Philippe Gareil, Maurizio Giammarco, Paolo Fresu... and Americans (Sangoma Everett, Jim Pepper)). He also records with his group Soma « Tacha » (Nil records) dist ZZ. The trio will be on tour for some time with Philippe Petrucciani.

In 1991, when his daughter Clara was born, he records Transe Lucide with Jean Jacques Avenel and Tony Moreno. Parallel to that, he teaches at the Professional Training Musical Institute of Salon-de-Provence“. In the room where he gives piano lessons a drum kit is permanently set up, he then learns how to play the drums as a self-taught man. He soon plays in groups as a drummer, namely with pianist Perrine Mansuy. On some occasions, he plays with other musicians such as Alain Jean-Marie, Michel Grailler, Siegfried Kessler or the English saxophonist Peter King.

From the late 90s, he regularly goes to New York, and shares his time between the United States of America and France.

Back in France, Gérard de Haro invited him to record his first solo piano album Vents et Marées (Harmonia Mundi, 2003). The disc received a warm welcome from the specialized press. In parallel he joins Gérard Faroux's group in which he'll have the opportunity to meet Misja Fitzgerald Michel, Micky and Ravi Coltrane, Gilles Naturel...

He then creates the group Transition with François Gallix, Gaël Horellou, Yoann Serra and Clara Simonoviez. After a series of concerts, the quintet becomes a septet, integrating arrangements for 2 saxophones, 3 voices, bass, drums, piano. In 2007, Gérard de Haro invited him to record and arrange for his La Buissone Label the project Crossing life and strings (La Buissonne / Harmonia Mundi) with Jean-Jacques Avenel, Riccardo Del Fra, Barre Phillips, Steve Swallow and the String Quartets Opus 33. In 2008, he's on tour with the Gaël Horellou quartet, with whom he records Pour la terre live at the Sunside with François Gallix and Ari Hoenig. In 2010 he takes part in Maurey Richards’ project and records The best is yet to come with Philippe Dardelle and Mourad Benhamou.

In 2010, he creates, and co-organizes until 2013, the Fontiers-Cabardès jazz festival.

In 2011, he takes part as pianist and arranger in the project To Frank by Clara Simonoviez with François Gallix, Gaël Horellou and Lolo Bellonzi.

The next year, in 2012, the album Transition Cosmic Power comes out at Black and Blue. In this album, he endorses the roles of author, composer, arranger, singer and pianist.

The album Transe Lucide comes out in February 2013, featuring Jean-Jacques Avenel and Anthony Moreno. Jean-Sébastien Simonoviez is also founder of the label « Hative Records ».

In 2014 another album « Multifaces » is recorded under the same label. Since 2015 he spends a fair amount of time in Asia and participates in a number of concerts with Vietnamese musicians, notably saxophonist Trần Mạnh Tuấn. .

He also meets Indonesian pianist Nita Aartsen with whom he collaborates as trumpeter and composer.

During this time, the record Transe Lucide is reissued by Indonesian label Demajors. In 2022, Vietnamese singer Hong Nhung invited him to become musical director of a project centered on the music of composer Trinh Cong Son for a vinyl recording. Once the arrangements were written by JS, Bống là ai? was recorded in 2023 at La Buissonne Studios with Nguyen Le, Quyen Thien Dac, Clara Simonoviez, Dominique Di Piazza, and Joël Allouche. The album was performed several times at the Hanoi Opera House.

In 2024, during a stay in Bangkok, he brought together musicians from several countries: Quyền Thiện Đắc (Vietnam), Jakob Dinesen (Denmark), Indra Gupta (Indonesia), and Pong Nakornchai (Thailand). They recorded Borderless 5tet as a vinyl album. The album was released under Hative Records.

Later in 2024, saxophonist Quyền Thiện Đắc invited him to join the project "Áo Giấy Spirit Money" as musical director, co-composer, arranger, and pianist. In this project, Quyền Thiện Đắc composed and played soprano saxophone, Nguyen Le played on three tracks and mixed the album, Clara Simonoviez handled vocals, Thomas Bramerie played double bass, and Joël Allouche drums. The Polish string quartet Altra Volta kwartet smyczkowy performed the violin parts. The project was released under Hative Records in 2025.

In 2025, Quyền Thiện Đắc asked Jean-Sébastien to arrange and write for strings and saxophone on pieces drawn from the red music repertoire (Nhạc Đỏ). The arrangements were performed by Quyền Thiện Đắc (soprano and tenor saxophones), the Altra Volta kwartet smyczkowy, Thomas Bramerie on double bass, and the orchestra conducted by Jean-Sébastien Simonoviez. The project was titled "Mãi mãi là tình yêu Unlimited love".

Later that year, Vietnamese singer Hoang Quyen asked Jean-Sébastien to arrange and conduct her new project "Dòng Sông (The River)". The arrangements were written on melodies and lyrics by Hoang Quyen, with choir (Clara Simonoviez), piano and trumpet (Jean-Sébastien Simonoviez), double bass (François Gallix), drums (Josselin Hazard), and string quartet (October String Quartet). Recording took place at La Buissonne Studios in October 2025; the album was produced as vinyl, and the official release took place in Hanoi on March 11, 2026.

== Discography ==
- Dòng Sông (The River), Hoang Quyen (2026)
- Mãi mãi là tình yêu Unlimited love, Quyền Thiện Đắc (2026)
- Áo Giấy Spirit Money, Quyền Thiện Đắc / Jean-Sebastien Simonoviez (2025)
- Borderless 5tet, Jean-Sébastien Simonoviez (2024)
- Bống là ai?, Hồng Nhung (2022)
- Voices for Peace, Doudou Gouirand, Jean-Sébastien Simonoviez, Joel Allouche (2021)
- Nisipadawa, Jean-Sébastien Simonoviez (2021)
- Bleu puis Vert orchestral, Jean-Sébastien Simonoviez / Nita Aartsen (2021)
- Spirit of the Waterfall, Jean-Sébastien Simonoviez / Jakob Dinesen (2019)
- Ballades au Vietnam, Jean-Sébastien Simonoviez (2018)
- Do Clara Simonoviez (2015)
- Multifaces Jean-Sébastien Simonoviez (2014)
- Transe Lucide Jean-Sébastien Simonoviez (2013)
- Transition Cosmic Power Jean-Sébastien Simonoviez (2012)
- To Frank Clara Simonoviez quintet (2011)
- The best is yet to come Maurey Richards (2010)
- Pour la Terre Gaël Horellou quartet (2009)
- Crossing life and strings Jean-Sébastien Simonoviez (2008)
- Transition Cosmic Power Jean-Sébastien Simonoviez (2006)
- A different way Jean-Sébastien Simonoviez (2005)
- ...Energize ! Simonoviez / d'Oelsnitz (2004)
- Vents et marées Jean-Sébastien Simonoviez (2003)
- Voarshadumia Voarshadumia Quintet (2002)
- The Flood Jean-Sébastien Simonoviez (2002)
- What's new ? Martine Kamoun (2001)
- Existence Jean-Sébastien Simonoviez (1997)
- Autour de la lune Perrine Mansuy (1997)
- Oh when the pandit Philippe Gareil (1995)
- Tacha Trio Soma (1989)
- Belleville Denis Fournier (1989)
- 5th edition Jean Pierre Llabador (1989)
- Standards André Jaume Quartet (1987)
- Áo-Giấy Spirit Money (2025)
