= Gil Cuppini =

Italian jazz drummer and bandleader

Gilberto "Gil" Cuppini (June 6, 1924, Milan - June 16, 1996, Sarzana) was an Italian jazz drummer and bandleader.

Cuppini began playing drums around the end of World War II, and by 1949 was playing in Hazy Osterwald's band; he was a sideman for Armando Trovajoli and Gorni Kramer at the inaugural Paris Jazz Fair. He played with Nunzio Rotondo for most of the 1950s, in addition to working with Gianni Basso and Oscar Valdambrini in a six-piece ensemble. He visited the United States and Belgium in 1958, playing in the latter with Teddy Wilson and Arvell Shaw.

He led his own Concert Jazz Band in the mid-1960s, which performed at La Scala, and worked extensively with Joe Venuti in the 1970s, as well as with pianist Franco D'Andrea and double bassist Giorgio Azzolini.
