= Gianni Basso =

Italian jazz saxophonist (1931–2009)

Gianni Basso (24 May 1931 – 17 August 2009) was an Italian jazz tenor saxophonist, who was influenced by Stan Getz.

He was born in Asti, Italy. He started his career shortly after World War II, at first as a clarinetist, then switching to the saxophone in the Belgian Raoul Faisant's Big Band. Basso worked with a number of touring American jazz musicians, including Chet Baker, Buddy Collette, Slide Hampton, Maynard Ferguson, Phil Woods and Gerry Mulligan.

== Quote ==
Tranquilli, non muoio, vado solo a suonare da un'altra parte. (Stay calm, I'm not going to die, I'm just going to play somewhere else)

— G. Basso

== See also ==
- Oscar Valdambrini
