= Tullio De Piscopo =

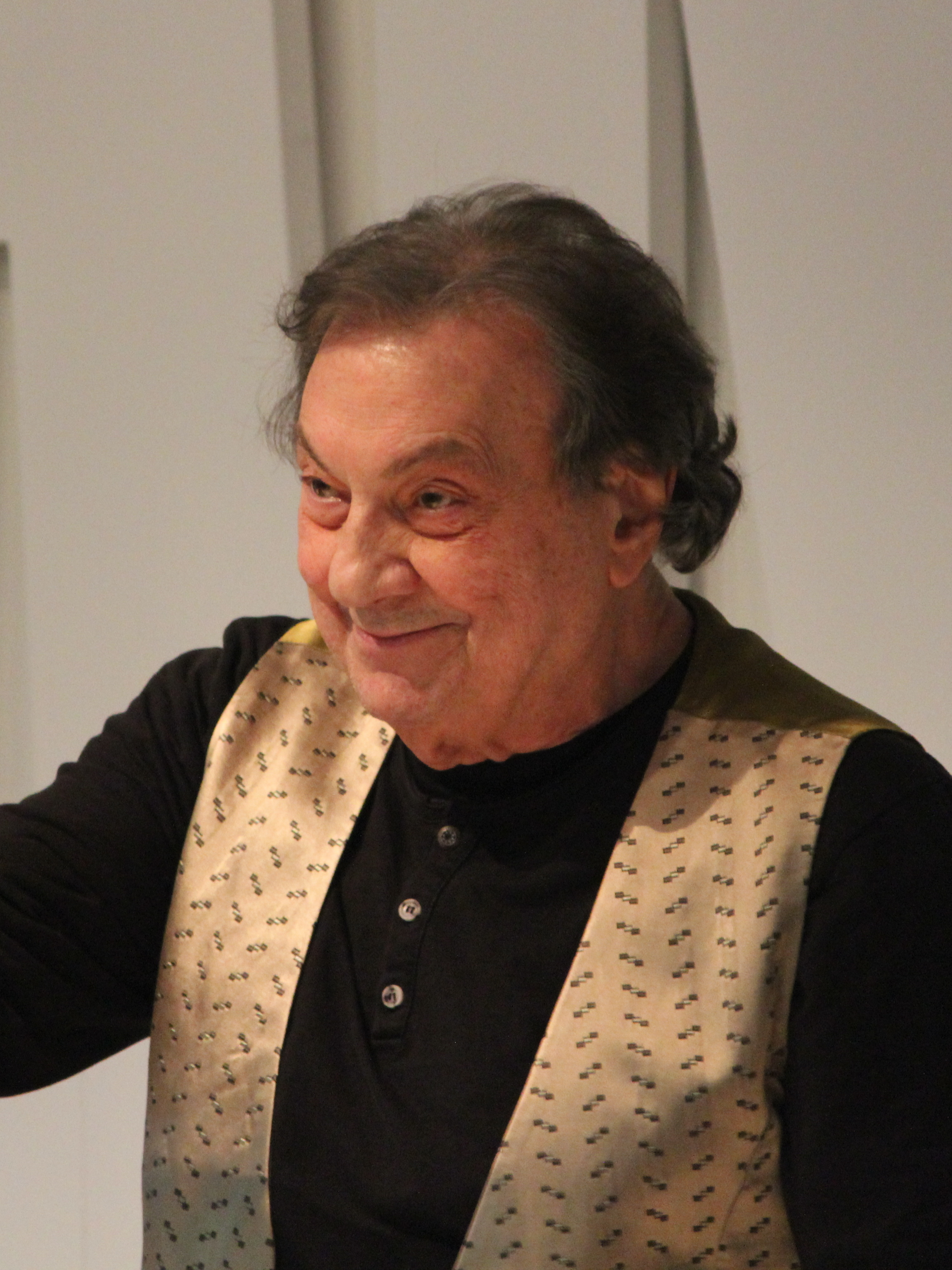
- De Piscopo at 2026 Sanremo Music Festival

Background information
- Born: February 24, 1946 (age 80); Naples, Italy
- Origin: Italian
- Occupations: drummer percussionist singer-songwriter
- Instrument: Drums

Tullio De Piscopo (born 24 February 1946) is an Italian drummer, percussionist and singer-songwriter.

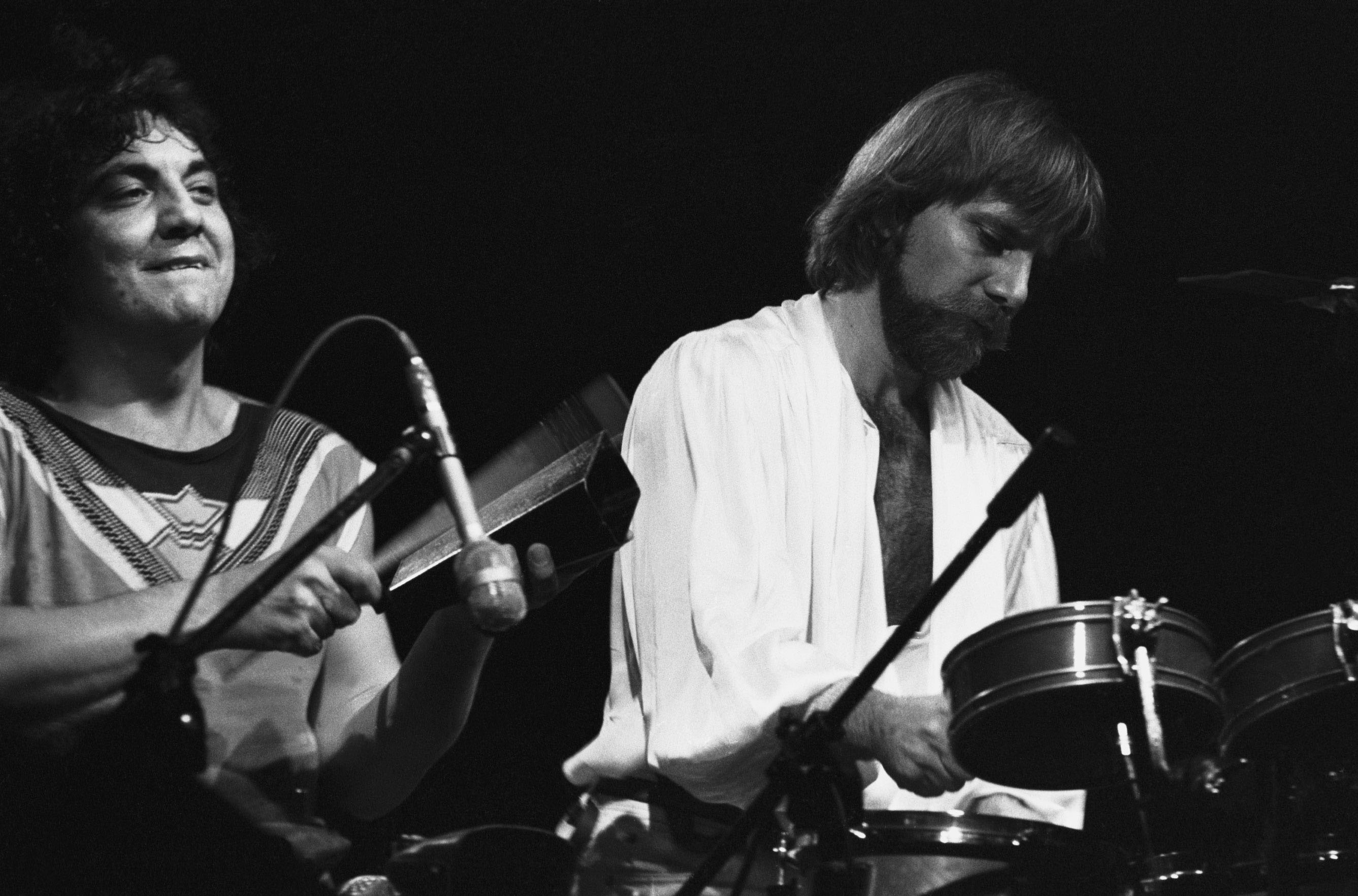
De Piscopo with Tony Esposito

De Piscopo was born in Naples. His father was an orchestra percussionist. In 1969 he moved to Turin and two years later he moved to Milan, where he joined the Franco Cerri quintet. He later began a successful career as session drummer, playing with many international artists, including Gerry Mulligan, Chet Baker, Stéphane Grappelli, Massimo Urbani, Gil Evans, Slide Hampton, Don Costa, Tony Scott, Ástor Piazzolla, Aldemaro Romero, Gato Barbieri, Eumir Deodato, Mina, Lucio Dalla, Franco Battiato, Fabrizio De André, Pino Daniele, Manu Chao and others.

Between the 1970s and 1980s, De Piscopo played on several occasions with bassist-arranger Pino Presti, with whom he established one of the top rhythm sessions in the Italian music scene. In 1974 and 1975, he was a member of New Trolls Atomic System. In 1979 De Piscopo played the drums in the album L'era del cinghiale bianco by the singer-songwriter Franco Battiato. The album reached the number one spot in Italy immediately after its publishing. In 2021, Tullio De Piscopo formed a jazz trio formed by him (drummer/percussionist), Aldo Zunino (bass player), Dado Moroni (pianist) .

De Piscopo released his first solo album, Suonando la batteria moderna, in 1974. One of his most successful songs is "Andamento lento", which won Festivalbar in 1988. His 1984 single "Stop Bajon (Primavera)" reached the No. 1 spot in Italy, No. 12 in Germany in December 1984, and No. 58 in the UK Singles Chart in March 1987.

His 1985 song "Radio Africa" (written by Lino Nicolosi and Dora Carofiglio) was a collaboration with Guinean singer Mory Kanté. He is also the owner of the record label Bagaria.

He also wrote scores for several films. Current DragonForce drummer Gee Anzalone was taught by Piscopo at the NAMM Academy in Milan and refers to him as an influence.

== Discography ==
- Suonando la batteria moderna (1974)
- Volume 2 (1975)
- Concerto per un film: L'arma (1978)
- Live (1981)
- Metamorphosis (1981)
- Acqua e viento (1983)
- Passaggio da Oriente (1985)
- Drum Symphony (1986)
- Bello carico (1988)
- Album (1989)
- De Piscopo (1991)
- Cosmopolitana (1993)
- Zzacotturtaic (1995)
- Pasión mediterranea (1997)
- Jazz Friends (2000)
- Live in Zurich at Mood's Club (2004)
- Bona Jurnata (2007)
