= Catene (album) =

Studio album by Mina
- Released: November 1984
- Recorded: 1984
- Studio: Studi PDU, Lugano
- Genre: Pop; rock; disco; jazz
- Length: 84:01
- Language: Italian; English; Spanish; Portuguese
- Label: PDU

Mina chronology
Mina 25 (1983)	Catene (1984)	Del mio meglio n. 8 (1985)

Singles from Catene
- 1. "Rose su rose" Released: February 1984; 2. "Comincia tu" Released: October 1984

Catene is a double studio album by Italian singer Mina, released in November 1984 by PDU and distributed by EMI Italiana.

== Overview ==
This album continues the joint soundtrack cycle with RAI for Paolo Frajese's program Trent'anni della nostra storia (Thirty Years of Our History), dedicated to the history of the broadcaster. This time Mina covered songs originally released between 1950 (Louis Prima's "Buona sera") and 1969 (Lucio Battisti's "Acqua azzurra, acqua chiara").

Two singles were released in support of the album. The first, "Rose su rose", was released in early 1984 and became the opening theme for that year's Sanremo Music Festival. The song reached number sixteen on the singles chart. The B-side was the song "Ninna Nanna", written by Massimiliano Pani and Valentino Alfano, and was not released on any album until 1998. The second single, "Comincia tu", was released in October of the same year and became the thirty-fifth in the singles chart. Either "La nave" or the disco mix of "Brigitte Bardot" were used as a B-side.

The album debuted at number twenty-one on the Italian chart and peaked at number two in its fourth week. In total, the album spent sixteen weeks on the chart. The album, in addition to Italy, was released in Germany and Switzerland. The two parts of the album were distributed both separately and in one edition. In 2001, it was remastered and released only as a double album.

== Track listing ==
=== Volume 1 ===
Side A
No.	Title	Writer(s)	Length
1.	"Brigitte Bardot"	Miguel Gustavo	4:05
2.	"Strangers in the Night"	Eddie Snyder; Charles Singleton; Bert Kaempfert	3:44
3.	"La verità"	Sergio Bardotti; Armando Trovajoli; Carlo Pes	4:17
4.	"Hey Jude"	John Lennon; Paul McCartney	6:16
5.	"Estate"	Bruno Martino; Bruno Brighetti	3:36

Side B
No.	Title	Writer(s)	Length
1.	"Banana Boat"	Harry Belafonte; Lord Burgess; William Attaway	3:49
2.	"E la chiamano estate"	Bruno Martino; Franco Califano; Laura Zanin	3:32
3.	"Gimme a Little Sign"	Jerry Winn; Alfred Smith; Joseph Hooven	3:23
4.	"Eso es el amor"	Pepe Iglesias "El Zorro"	3:40
5.	"Buona sera"	Carl Sigman; Peter De Rose	3:32
6.	"Acqua azzurra, acqua chiara"	Lucio Battisti; Mogol	4:10

=== Volume 2 ===
Side C
No.	Title	Writer(s)	Length
1.	"Comincia tu"	Massimiliano Pani; Piero Cassano	4:15
2.	"Più di così"	Alberto Salerno; Giampietro Felisatti	4:17
3.	"Ballando ballando"	Giorgio Calabrese; Celso Valli	3:58
4.	"Rose su rose"	Pani; Cassano	4:00
5.	"Momento magico"	Anselmo Genovese	4:22

Side D
No.	Title	Writer(s)	Length
1.	"Sogno (Sonhos)"	Peninha; Cristiano Malgioglio	4:55
2.	"La nave"	Guido Guglielminetti	4:56
3.	"Per di più"	Calabrese; Valli	5:01
4.	"La casa del nord"	Pani; Valentino Alfano	4:17

== Personnel ==
- Mina – vocals, background vocals (A1, D2)
- Victor Bach – arrangement (A1–B6), background vocals (A1), strings (A2, A5, B2)
- Celso Valli – arrangement (C1, C3–C5), keyboards (C3, D3), piano (C1, C4)
- Massimiliano Pani – arrangement (C2, D1, D4), background vocals (D2)
- Paolo Gianolio – arrangement (D2), background vocals (D2), bass guitar (A1, C1–C3, D2, D3), guitar (A1–A4, B1–B6, C1–C5, D1–D4), keyboards (C2, D2)
- D. Cremonesi – background vocals (A1)
- Mauro Balletti – background vocals (A1)
- Giulia Fasolino – background vocals (A2–A4, B1–B4, B6)
- J. Hilleven – background vocals (A2–A4, B1–B4, B6)
- Lella Esposito – background vocals (A2–A4, B1–B4, B6, C3)
- Moreno Ferrara – background vocals (A2–A4, B1–B4, B6)
- Sam Trevino – background vocals (A2–A4, B1–B4, B6)
- Naimy Hackett – background vocals (A2–A4, B–B4, B6)
- Silvio Pozzoli – background vocals (A2–A4, B1–B4, B6, C3)
- Adriano Pratesi – background vocals (A4, B3)
- Marco Ferradini – background vocals (C3)
- Stefano Anselmo – background vocals (A1)
- Massimo Moriconi – bass guitar (A2–A5, B1–B6, D1, D4)
- Gigi Cappellotto – bass guitar (C4, C5)
- Ellade Bandini – drums (A2–A5, B1–B6)
- Flaviano Cuffari – drums (C1, C3–C5, D2, D3)
- Walter Scebran – drums (D1, D4)
- Sergio Farina – guitar (A5)
- Simonne Sporck – harp (A5)
- Roberto Zanaboni – keyboards (D1, D4)
- George Aghedo – percussion (C2)
- Aldo Banfi – synthesizer (C1, C3–C5, D2, D3)
- Piero Cairo – synthesizer (C3)
- Nuccio Rinaldis – recording

Credits are adapted from the album's liner notes.

== Charts ==
Chart performance for Catene
Chart (1984)	Peak position
Italian Albums (Billboard)	4
Italian Albums (Musica e dischi)	2
