= Comincia tu =

Single by Mina

from the album Catene
- Language: Italian
- B-side: "La nave" / "Brigitte Bardot"
- Released: 19 October 1984
- Recorded: 1984
- Studio: Studi PDU, Lugano
- Genre: Pop
- Length: 4:11
- Label: PDU
- Songwriters: Massimiliano Pani; Piero Cassano

Mina singles chronology
"Rose su rose" (1984)	"Comincia tu" (1984)	"Questione di feeling" (1985)

Alternative cover
- Artwork for the re-release

"Comincia tu" (English: "You start") is a song written by Massimiliano Pani and Piero Cassano for Italian singer Mina. The song was released as a single from the album Catene with "La nave" on the back in October 1984. The single was later re-released with a disco mix of "Comincia tu" and the song "Brigitte Bardot" as the b-side. Nevertheless, the single performed modestly on the charts.

The song "Comincia tu" was the main theme of the second cycle of the television program Trent'anni della nostra storia, broadcast from mid-February to mid-April 1985, which tells the second decade of Italian history from 1956 to 1965, through the most significant and salient facts of the period.

== Track listing ==
7" single
A. "Comincia tu" – 4:11
B. "La nave" (Guido Guglielminetti) – 4:53

12" single
A. "Comincia tu" (Disco Mix) – 4:11
B. "Brigitte Bardot" (Miguel Gustavo) – 4:02

== Personnel ==
"Comincia tu"

- Mina – vocals
- Celso Valli – arrangement, piano
- Paolo Gianolio – bass guitar, guitar
- Flaviano Cuffari – drums
- Aldo Banfi – synthesizer
- Nuccio Rinaldis – recording

"La nave"

- Mina – vocals, backing vocals
- Paolo Gianolio – arrangement, backing vocals, bass guitar, guitar, keyboards
- Massimiliano Pani – backing vocals
- Flaviano Cuffari – drums
- Aldo Banfi – synthesizer
- Nuccio Rinaldis – recording

"Brigitte Bardot"

- Mina – vocals, backing vocals
- Victor Bach – arrangement, backing vocals
- Paolo Gianolio – bass guitar
- D. Cremonesi – backing vocals
- Mauro Balletti – backing vocals
- Stefano Anselmo – backing vocals
- Nuccio Rinaldis – recording

Credits are adapted from the album's liner notes.

== Charts ==
Chart performance for "Comincia tu"
Chart (1984)	Peak position
Italy (Musica e dischi)	35
