= Caju Cemetery =

Cemetery in the state of Rio de Janeiro, Brazil

San Francisco Xavier Cemetery Caju Cemetery
- Cemitério de São Francisco Xavier; Cemitério Caju
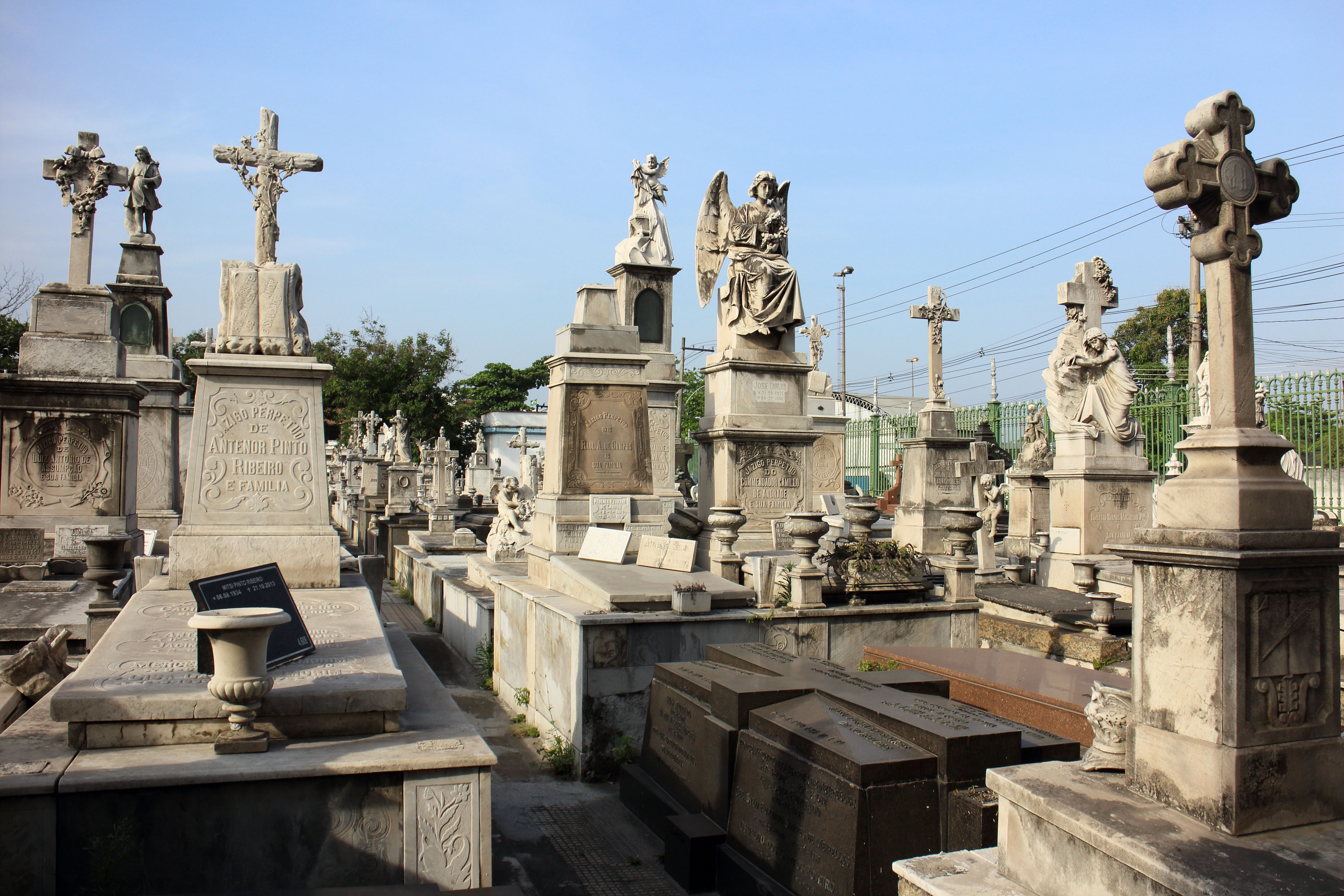
- view of the cemetery
- Interactive map of San Francisco Xavier Cemetery; Caju Cemetery

Details
- Established: 18 October 1851
- Location: Caju, in Rio de Janeiro
- Country: Brazil
- Coordinates: 22.883°S 43.222°W
- Type: public. multifaith
- Style: eclectic
- Owned by: Prefeitura da Cidade do Rio de Janeiro
- Size: 441.000 m^{2}
- Website: Official website
- Find a Grave: San Francisco Xavier Cemetery; Caju Cemetery

The São Francisco Xavier Cemetery is the largest of the many necropolises that make up the group popularly known as the Caju Cemetery, located in the Caju neighborhood of Rio de Janeiro's North Zone. It is the largest cemetery in the state of Rio de Janeiro, covering 441,000 m^{2}, and one of the largest in Brazil. The other cemeteries that make up the group of necropolises are the Cemetery of the Third Order of Carmel, the Cemetery of the Venerable Third Order of St. Francis of Penance and the Jewish Communal Cemetery of Caju. It was officially founded on 18 October 1851, in the same place where a slave cemetery had existed since 1839, and has been administered by the Concessionária Reviver since 2015, after more than 150 years of administration by the Santa Casa de Misericórdia [Holy House of Mercy].

== History ==
The cemetery was originally located near São Cristóvão beach, but was replaced due to several instances of land reclamation. It was the former Campo da Misericórdia (Field of Mercy), used since 1839 when, on July 2, the body of Victoria, a creole, daughter of Thereza, slave of Manoel Rodrigues dos Santos was interred. It was used for the burial of slaves until 1851, when, by decree No. 842 of October 16 of the same year, this cemetery and the public cemetery of Saint John the Baptist were founded.

For the transformation into a public cemetery, several neighboring properties were acquired and, thus, the surface area was greatly increased. On November 8, 1851, the Holy House Provider José Clemente Pereira reported that the São Francisco Xavier Cemetery was in a state to be able to provide services within the 15 days of Regulation No. 796. Indeed, on December 5, the burial took place of a "free African woman No. 187, from Manguinhos, belonging to the House of Correction, deceased at the Misericordia Hospital, of gastroenterocolitis" [translation from original Portuguese]. The last body buried in the [former] Campo Santo da Misericórdia, in 1851, was from a "free African man, sent from the House of Correction, No.50, burial No. 2,218" [translation from original Portuguese, as above].

It has taken several land reclamations and flattening the land over the years to make the whole area flat and dry as it is swampy due to the proximity of Guanabara Bay. For the land reclamations, a hill that existed in the northern part of the necropolis was thinned.

== Features ==
The cemetery is bordered by a high masonry wall, and in the central part of this wall is a monumental iron railing, on a granite base, with iron gates at either end. In the middle of this railing, is the building used as a vestibule of the necropolis, consisting of two pavilions with granite façades flanking the imposing portico. This construction was originally planned by the engineer José Maria Jacinto Rebelo; It was, however, executed with modifications that gave it greater grandeur by the architect Francisco Joaquim Béthencourt da Silva. The main entrance to the cemetery is in R. Monsenhor Manuel Gomes, a North-South thoroughfare through São Cristóvão.

The cemetery originally provided temporary graves for a period of seven years and, according to the wishes of the families, also sold perpetual graves, which is why there have been rich and imposing chapels built throughout its history.

Within the cemetery grounds, at its southeast end, there is also the Quadra dos Acatólicos [Non-Catholic area], reserved for the burial of Jews and Protestants. It was used prior to the construction of the neighboring Jewish Communal Cemetery of Rio de Janeiro. Filled with ancient and historical graves, it has been the subject of several studies, books and theses.

Another area of 1,885 square meters, surrounded by railings, with French ceramic tiled floors, is the Cemitério de São Pedro [Saint Peter's Cemetery], reserved for Catholics of the order of the same name. It was acquired in 1866 by the Venerável Irmandade do Príncipe Apóstolos São Pedro [Venerable Brotherhood of the Prince of Apostles St. Peter], as a product of the bequest of Father José Luís de Oliveira.

Originally, most of the burials belonged to residents of the northern region of the city and, because it is next to São Cristóvão neighborhood, many personalities of the empire were buried there throughout the middle of the nineteenth century. But, curiously, the first person of recognized nobility buried there was a French citizen, Viscount Villiers de l'Isle d'Adam, deceased at the Morro do Livramento Nursing Home on 10 July 1852 at the age of 65.

Among the most notable chapels and graves are those of the architect Antonio Jannuzzi; the Baron of Mangaratiba; the visconde do Rio Branco; Santa Casa's benefactor, Luísa Rosa Avondano Pereira; the magistrate and politician José Clemente Pereira, an active participant in the Masonic Order; Benjamin_de_Oliveira Brazil's first black clown, who died on 3 May 1954 and the journalist and songwriter Miguel Gustavo.

One of the most curious tombs is the so-called "Mausoléu dos Mártires Integralistas" (actually an ossuary), which houses the remains of the militants killed during the Integralist Uprising ('Putsch') of 11 May 1938

The doctor and memoirist Pedro Nava who is buried in the cemetery, wrote in his book Balão Cativo [Captive Balloon], one of the most beautiful and sentimental descriptions of the Caju cemetery and its graves. The impression of his first visit there as a boy was that "Transpondo seu pórtico de pedra eu tive a percepção invasora (e para sempre entranhada e durável) de um impacto silencioso e formidando" ["Crossing his stone portico (he had) the invasive (and forever ingrained and durable) perception of a silent and formidable impact"].

== Bibliography ==
- Nava, Pedro. Balão Cativo/ memórias 2. Rio de Janeiro: Livraria José Olympio Editora, 2ª edição, 1974
- Santos, Antonio Alves Ferreira dos. A Archidiocese de S.Sebastião do Rio de Janeiro: subsídios para a historia ecclesiastica do Rio de Janeiro, capital do Brasil. Rio de Janeiro: Typographia Leuzinger, 1914
