= Manuel Alves Branco, 2nd Viscount of Caravelas =

Prime Minister of Brazil from 1847 to 1848

His Excellency The Viscount of Caravelas
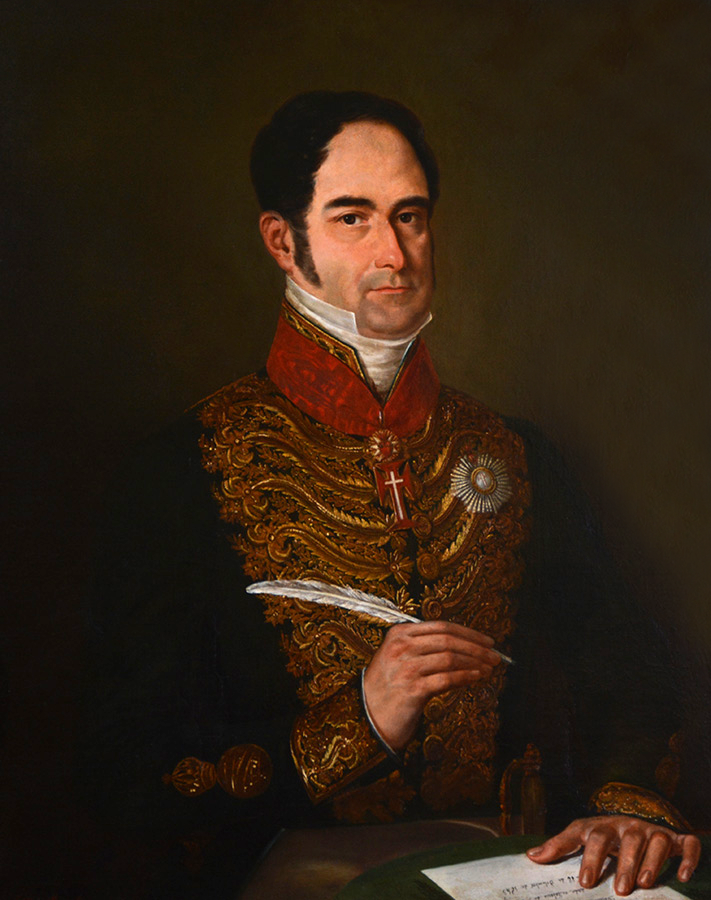
- Portrait by José Correia de Lima, unknown date

Prime Minister of Brazil
- In office 22 May 1847 – 8 March 1848
- Monarch: Pedro II
- Preceded by: Office created
- Succeeded by: Viscount of Macaé
Further offices held
Minister of Justice
In office 2 February 1844 – 23 May 1844
Preceded by	Honório Hermeto Carneiro
Succeeded by	Antonio Limpo de Abreu
In office 16 January 1835 – 14 October 1835
Preceded by	Aureliano Coutinho
Succeeded by	Manuel Antônio Galvão
Minister of Foreign Affairs
In office 16 January 1835 – 5 February 1836
Preceded by	Aureliano Coutinho (interim)
Succeeded by	José Inácio Borges (interim)
Minister of Finance
In office 22 May 1847 – 8 March 1848
Preceded by	Antônio Francisco Cavalcanti de Albuquerque
Succeeded by	Viscount of Abaeté
In office 2 February 1844 – 2 May 1846
Preceded by	Joaquim Francisco Viana
Succeeded by	Antônio Francisco Cavalcanti de Albuquerque
In office 1 September 1839 – 18 May 1840
Preceded by	Cândido Batista de Oliveira
Succeeded by	José Antônio da Silva Maia
In office 16 May 1837 – 19 September 1837
Preceded by	Manuel do Nascimento Castro e Silva
Succeeded by	Miguel Calmon du Pin e Almeida
Parliament offices
1853–1855	Senator for Bahia
1850–1852	Senator for Bahia
1848–1849	Senator for Bahia
1845–1847	Senator for Bahia
1843–1844	Senator for Bahia
1838–1841	Senator for Bahia
1837–1837	Senator for Bahia
1830–1833	General Deputy for Bahia

Personal details
- Born: 7 June 1797 Salvador, Bahia, State of Brazil
- Died: 13 July 1855 (aged 58) Niterói, Rio de Janeiro, Empire of Brazil
- Party: Liberal
- Education: University of Coimbra
- Occupation: Politician
- Awards: Order of the Cross
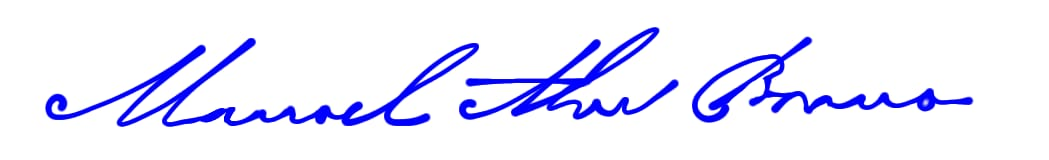
- Signature

Manuel Alves Branco, 2nd Viscount of Caravelas (Brazilian Portuguese: [mɐnuˈɛw ˈawviz ˈbɾɐ̃ku]; 7 June 1797 – 13 July 1855) was a Brazilian politician, economist, and magistrate during the Empire of Brazil (1822–1889). He held the positions of general deputy, minister of justice, minister of finance, senator and was also the first de jure Prime Minister of Brazil.

Born in Salvador in 1797, Alves Branco left Brazil to study at the University of Coimbra in 1815, where he received a degree in Law and Natural Sciences in 1823. After returning to Brazil in 1824, he served as judge in Salvador, Santo Amaro and finally Rio de Janeiro. He began his political career in 1830 after being elected general deputy for Bahia to the General Assembly's 2nd legislature (1830–1833), joining the Liberal Party.

During his political career, Alves Branco was responsible for the introduction of several important measures. He was the main drafter of Brazil's first Criminal Procedure Code and, together with José Bonifácio, was also behind the country's first legal initiative towards women's suffrage. As minister of finance, he introduced a new customs tariff in 1844 with the primary aim of increasing Brazil's revenue and reducing the fiscal deficit in the country's trade balance. The tariff, which became known as the Alves Branco Tariff, led to a relative surge in industrialization in Brazil. He died in Niterói in 1855.

== Biography ==
=== Early life ===
The son of João Alves Branco and Ana Joaquina de S. Silvestre, Manuel Alves Branco was born on 7 June 1797 in Salvador, Bahia, where he had his first studies, learning French, Latin, logic and rhetoric. Due to his early performance, his family sent him to study at the University of Coimbra in 1815, where he graduated in Law and Natural Sciences in 1823, having also attended the Mathematics course for three years. Alves Branco returned to Brazil in 1824, going to Rio de Janeiro, from where he was sent to Salvador to serve as a criminal judge that same year. Three years later, he was appointed to serve as juiz de fora in Santo Amaro.

=== Political career ===
==== General deputy (1830–1833) ====
After serving as a magistrate in Bahia, Manuel Alves Branco was appointed as juiz de fora in the Court, where he began his political career after being elected deputy for Bahia to the General Assembly's 2nd legislature in 1830, joining the Liberal Party. Together with deputy José Bonifácio, Alves Branco presented a bill on 28 July 1831 to reformulate the country's electoral system. The bill, inspired on a French one that had been discussed earlier that year, included the right of women to vote in primary elections, provided they were the householder, that is, widowed or separate from their husbands, (Note: Article 3 of the bill provided that "Mothers of families who are widows, or separated from their husbands, who meet the necessary conditions to exercise the right to vote in the primary Assemblies, may cast their vote through one of their children, sons-in-law, grandchildren, or any relative if the former are missing", Marques 2019, p. 31) but it was not voted nor discussed, due to the political crisis that took hold of the country following the beginning of the regency in 1831. Nonetheless, it was the first initiative for women's suffrage in Brazil.

As deputy, Alves Branco was tasked by the Chamber of Deputies with creating Brazil's first Criminal Procedure Code in July 1831. The creation of such code, as mandated by the Imperial Constitution, had begun in the First Reign, when Lúcio Soares Teixeira de Gouveia, then minister of justice, presented his draft in May 1829. Together with Antônio José da Veiga and José Antônio da Silva Maia, Alves Branco was elected to the commission that would present a new code based on Gouveia's project, being its main drafter. The new criminal procedure code, only lightly discussed in the assembly, was approved on 29 November 1832. Together, the Criminal Procedure Code and the Criminal Code, the latter approved in 1830, revoked Book V of the Philippine Ordinances, which had been in force in Brazil since the colonial period.

The new Criminal Procedure Code rationalized criminal justice in Brazil by introducing new formulas and institutions. It abolished the old colonial justice offices, such as the juízes de fora, and centered the new judicial structure around new offices such as the justices of the peace, which were elected. The code, which also expanded civil and political rights, as well as legal guarantees, was deemed an extremely liberal document, being later reformed in 1841 and 1871.

=== Alves Branco Tariff ===
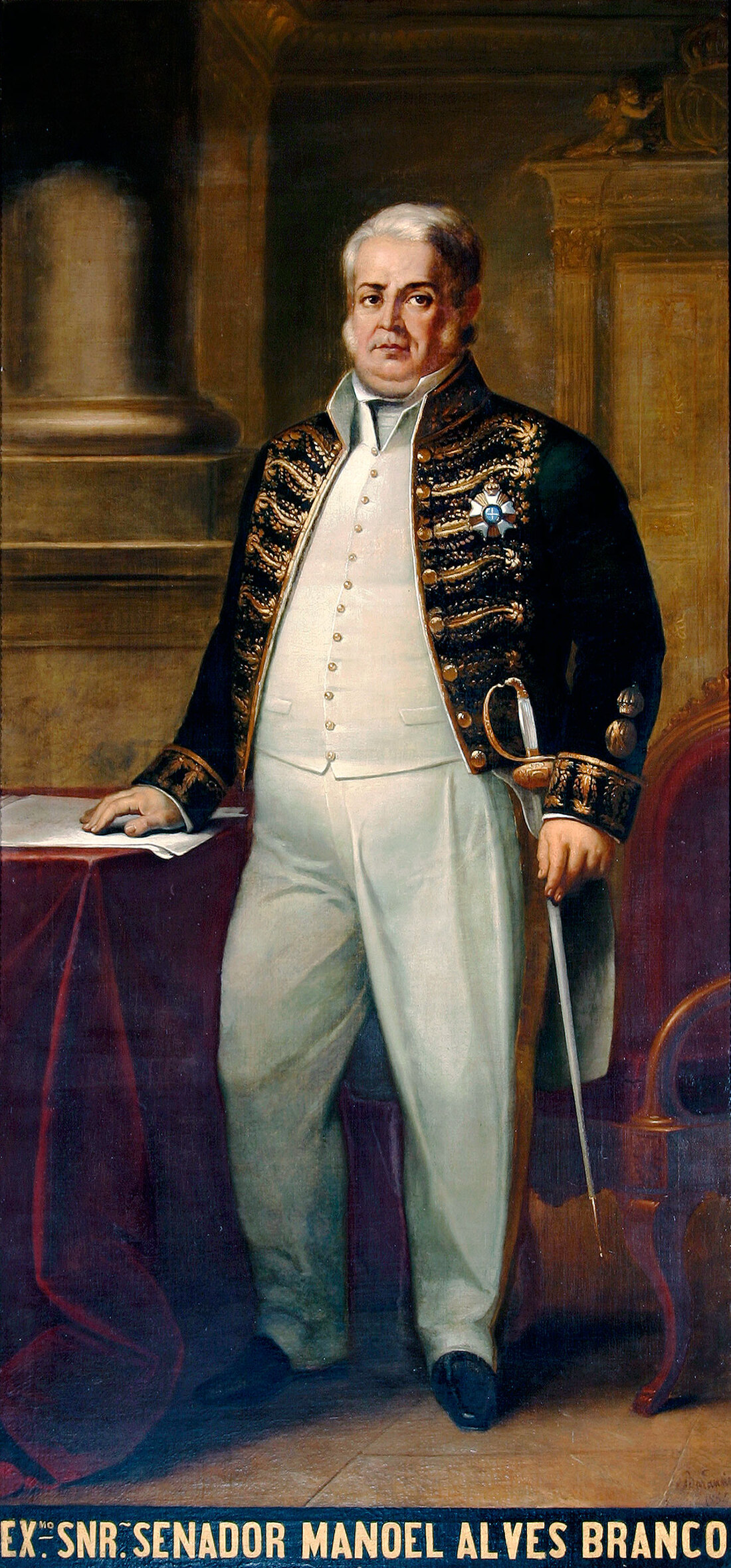
Portrait by Claude Joseph Barandier, 1854

In 1810, in the context of the French invasion of Portugal during the Napoleonic Wars, prince regent John of Braganza signed the treaties of Alliance and Friendship and Commerce and Navigation with the United Kingdom as compensation for the British support and protection in the transfer of the Portuguese court to Brazil. With the arrival of the Portuguese royal family in Brazil, prince regent John had signed a decree on 28 January 1808 that opened Brazil's ports to foreign trade. While initially not discriminating the origin of products in relation to the application of tariffs, a new decree was issued on 11 June 1808 that established a preferential tax of 16% to Portuguese goods, which led the United Kingdom to protest. Thus, the British government, taking advantage of its influence over Portugal, signed the Strangford Treaty with the Portuguese on 19 February 1810, which granted a series of privileges to British subjects residing in Brazil and also to British goods imported into the country.

As part of the treaty, British products would be subject to a 15% customs tariff, while Portuguese ones would pay 16% and the rest of the world 24%. The preferential tariff to British goods was met with strong opposition in Brazil including local merchants and the elite. In need of international recognition following its war of independence, and despite internal opposition, Brazil renewed the treaty for 15 years in 1827 as compensation for British support in the country's recognition by Portugal, which came with the 1825 Treaty of Rio de Janeiro.

As the end of the treaty approached, the debate between defenders of the agricultural sector and industrialists resurfaced, as the latter saw the opportunity to use the customs duties as a mechanism to promote industrialization. The end of the treaty, initially expected to 1842 and later postponed to 1844, coincided with Brazil's internal process of strengthening of the central power following the end of the regency period with the declaration of majority of Pedro II. With the end of the regency period, plagued by rebellions and political instability, Brazil could turn its attention to its foreign policy and seek to break free from British influence.

In this context, the so-called Alves Branco Tariff was introduced with Decree No. 376 of 12 August 1844, which established a 30% tariff on a total of 2,243 imported goods, while the remaining ones would be subject to tariffs ranging from 2 to 60%. In his statement of reasons regarding the tariff, Alves Branco explained that:

Since the first objective of the tariff is to fill the deficit, in which the country has been working for years, it was my duty to ensure that the new rate of duties, which comprised the largest sum of values, was such that it would probably fill it; and because the income [generated] by the 20 percent which were generally paid for foreign goods brought to the country amounted to 12 to 13 thousand contos, it was obvious that, [in order] to achieve that aim, it would be necessary to increase it by another 10 percent; and this is the reason why foreign imports are [now] generally taxed at 30 percent.

In André Villela's evaluation, the introduction of the tariff was "the first clearest manifestation of an official desire to grant some protection to domestic manufacturing activity [in Brazil], at that time still restricted to sugar mills, food processing, brickworks, small foundries and the homemade cloth industry". The subsequent academic debate about the tariff centered on its "true intention": on one side were those who considered its introduction only as a way of alleviating the precarious situation of revenue for the public treasury and on the other those who saw it as intended to protect the country's industry.

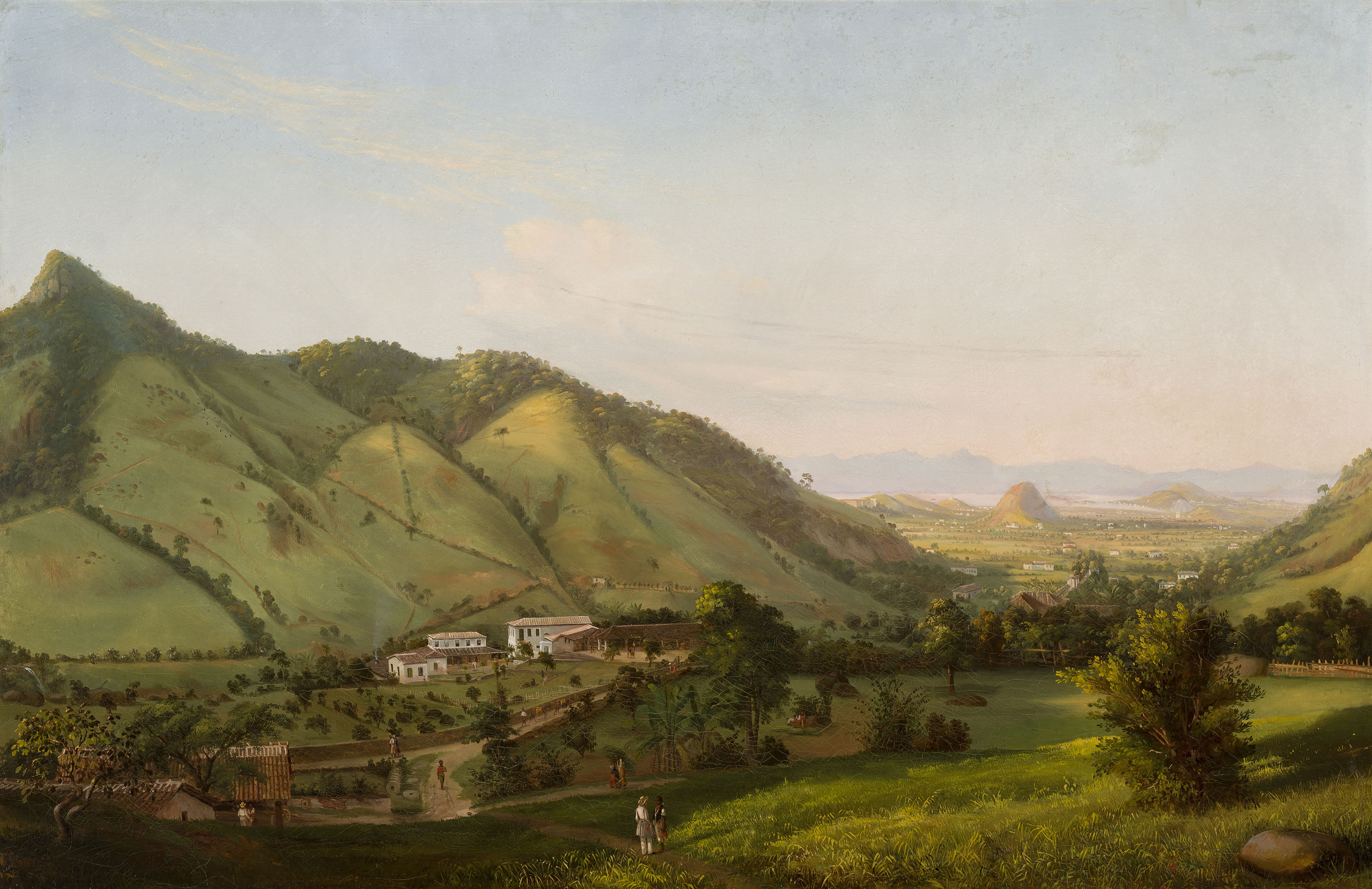
The Meuron Factory in Andaraí, Rio de Janeiro, c. 1840s

André Villela stated that the motives behind the introduction of the Alves Branco Tariff were, above all, the result of pragmatism, since, given the "chronic deficit situation of the imperial treasury" at the time and the country's incipient industry, it was "inevitable that [...] the primary function of the tariff policy had been to maximize tax revenue". Pedro Cezar Dutra Fonseca argued that, despite being "doubtful that the tariff resulted in a protectionist effect, since the 30% tax rate applied to most goods was considered low by Alves Branco himself", it is undeniable that the debate regarding the tax policy was fueled by nationalism, with Alves Branco stating that the General Assembly wanted "not only to fill the state's deficit, but also protect national capital already employed within the country in some manufacturing industry, and encourage others to seek the same fate".

While the tariff's main goal was to solve the fiscal deficit, Villela concluded that "'fiscal' and 'protectionist' objectives are not mutually exclusive" and that, considering the heavier tariffs imposed on imported goods that had a local equivalent, namely textiles and ironworks, the policymakers at the time also valued protectionism. The adoption of the tariff thus led to industrial growth in these areas, which expanded in Minas Gerais, Bahia and Rio de Janeiro, the latter of which saw the construction of steamships with the Baron of Mauá's shipyard. According to Luiz Carlos Soares, the adoption of the Alves Branco Tariff was one of the factors that stimulated Brazilian industry in the 1840s, when "a surge of industrial growth began in the city of Rio de Janeiro and in other locations across the country, [...] in addition to the expansion of markets brought about by the coffee boom and the sudden population growth in the middle of the century".

=== Prime Minister of Brazil ===
The office of prime minister of Brazil, officially called "president of the council of ministers", was created by Decree No. 523 of 20 July 1847. The creation of the office changed one of the prerogatives of the moderating power, exercised by the emperor of Brazil: that of freely appointing and removing the ministers of state. After the decree, it was up to the prime minister, once appointed by the emperor, to nominate the ministers with the monarch's consent. Thus, Manuel Alves Branco became the first de jure prime minister of Brazil on 22 May 1847.

=== Death ===
Manuel Alves Branco died in Niterói on 13 July 1855.
