= Sagramor de Scuvero =

Brazilian journalist, and radio announcer (1913–1967)

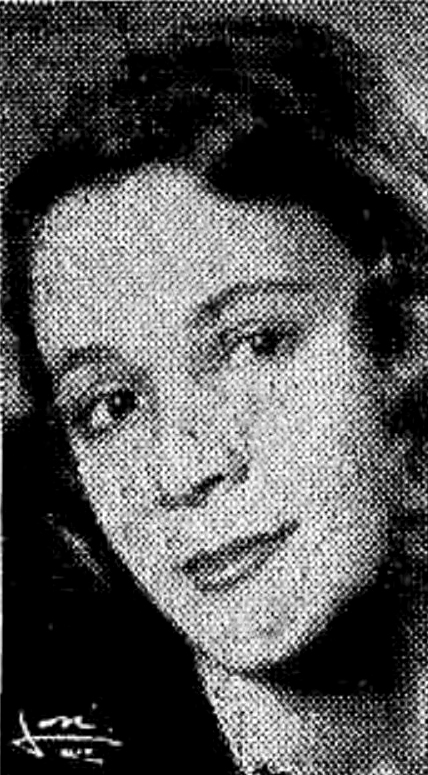
- Born: Sagramor de Scuvero Brandão; 30 September 1921; São Paulo
- Died: 9 October 1995 (aged 74); Rio de Janeiro
- Occupations: Actress, radio personality, councillor
- Spouse: Miguel Gustavo
- Children: Ana Maria, Maria Lúcia

Sagramor de Scuvero Brandão (30 September 1921 – 9 October 1995) was a Brazilian actress and radio announcer. She was also a councillor in Rio de Janeiro from 1948 to 1956.

== Biography ==
Born in 1921 in São Paulo, she started as a radio personality, in São Paulo, in local emissions.

She married composer Miguel Gustavo and the couple had two daughters. Post-marriage, they moved to Rio de Janeiro and she continued working at radio. She worked at Rádio Globo, at Rádio Bandeirantes and at Rádio Mayrink Veiga. From 1948 to 1956 she was councillor in Rio de Janeiro, being the first women to be elected to the municipal council.

She died of cancer in 1995 in Rio de Janeiro.

== Radio programs at Rádio Globo ==
- 1945: Programa Feminino
- 1945: Marcha Nupcial
- 1946–1952: O Mundo Não Vale O Seu Lar

== Books ==
- Na casa do sonho - Editora Anchieta - 1941
- Eu quero ficar homem - Editora do Brasil
