= José Paranhos, Viscount of Rio Branco =

Brazilian politician and diplomat (1819–1880)

His Excellency The Viscount of Rio Branco
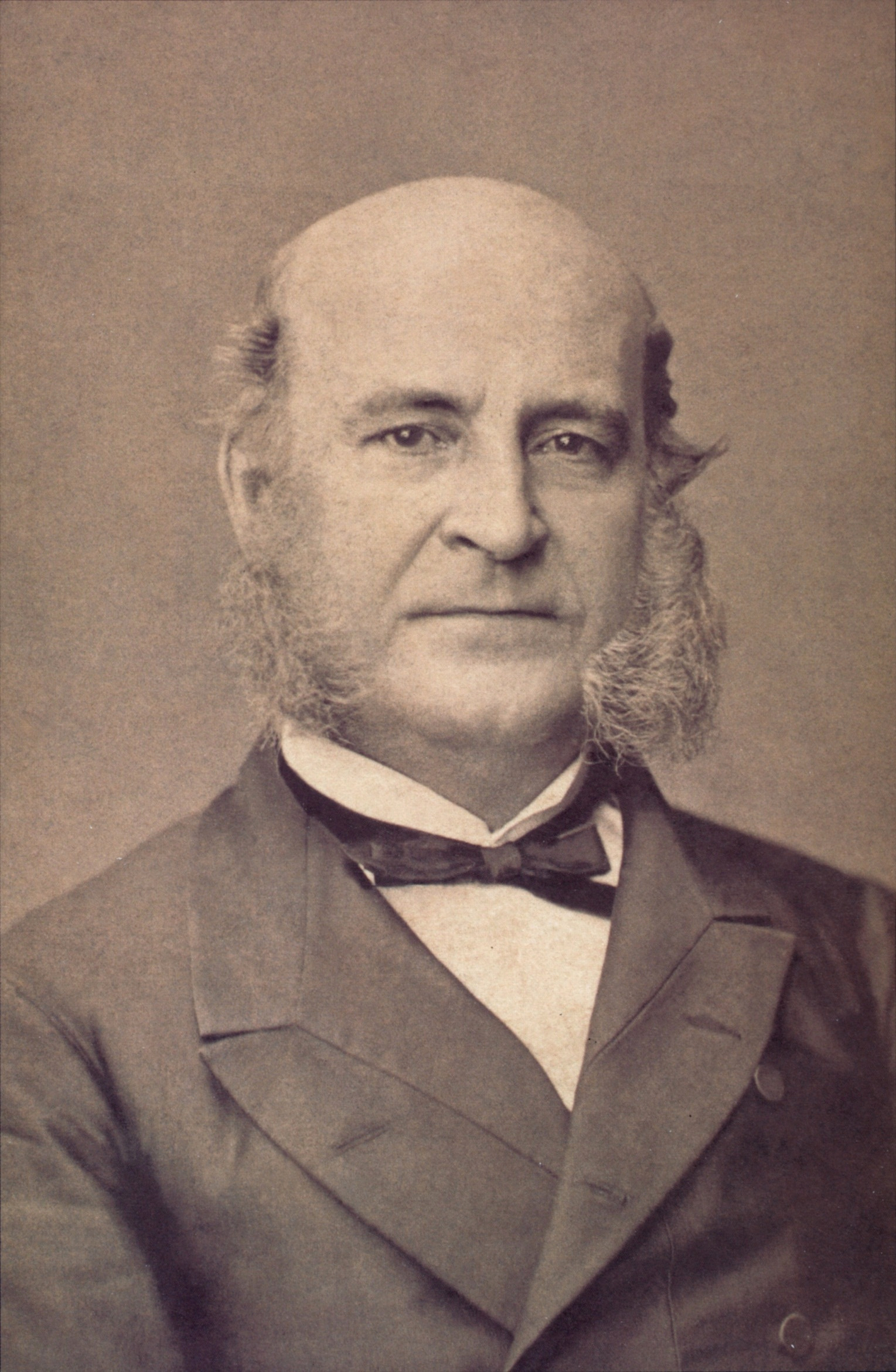
- 1879 portrait

Prime Minister of Brazil
- In office 7 March 1871 – 25 June 1875
- Monarch: Pedro II
- Preceded by: Viscount of São Vicente
- Succeeded by: Duke of Caxias

Personal details
- Born: José Maria da Silva Paranhos; 16 March 1819 Salvador, Bahia, Kingdom of Brazil
- Died: 1 November 1880 (aged 61) Rio de Janeiro, Empire of Brazil
- Party: Liberal (1847–1849); Conservative (1853–1880)
- Spouse: Teresa de Figueiredo Faria
- Children: 9, including the Baron of Rio Branco
- Occupation: Politician

- Coat of Arms of the Viscount of Rio Branco

José Maria da Silva Paranhos, Viscount of Rio Branco (16 March 1819 – 1 November 1880), was a Brazilian politician, monarchist, diplomat, teacher and journalist. Rio Branco was born in Salvador, in what was then the Captaincy of Bahia, to a wealthy family, but most of the fortune was lost after his parents' deaths early in his childhood. In 1871, Rio Branco became the president of the Council of Ministers. He would be the Council's longest-serving president, and his cabinet the second longest, in Brazilian history. His government was marked by economic prosperity and several reforms. The most important of these initiatives was the Law of Free Birth, which granted freeborn status to children born to slave women. Rio Branco led the government that enacted this law, and its passage increased his popularity. His government was plagued by a long crisis with the Catholic Church that resulted from the expulsion of Freemasons from its lay brotherhoods. After more than four years heading the Cabinet, Rio Branco resigned in 1875. Following a long vacation in Europe, his health swiftly declined and he was diagnosed with oral cancer. Rio Branco died in 1880 and was widely mourned throughout the country. He is regarded by most historians as one of Brazil's greatest statesmen.

Rio Branco attended Brazil's Naval School and became a midshipman in 1841. Later that year he was enrolled in the Army's Military Academy, eventually becoming an instructor there. Rather than continue to serve in the military, he became a politician in the Liberal Party. In 1845, he was elected a member of the provincial house of representatives of Rio de Janeiro province, site of the national capital of the same name. Rio Branco rose to power within the province under the tutelage of Aureliano Coutinho, Viscount of Sepetiba—a veteran politician who held tremendous influence over the young and inexperienced Emperor Pedro II. He temporarily abandoned politics after Aureliano Coutinho's fall from grace and the subsequent dissolution of the Liberal Party.

Rio Branco's work in the press, highlighting threats posed by the armed conflicts in the Platine republics (Argentina and Uruguay), attracted the attention of Honório Hermeto Carneiro Leão, Marquis of Paraná, who invited him to act as secretary on a diplomatic mission to Montevideo. They were successful in forging alliances, which contributed to the eventual fall in 1852 of Juan Manuel de Rosas, an Argentine dictator who had declared war on Brazil. In 1853 Rio Branco joined the Marquis of Paraná's Conservative Party as well as the cabinet over which the latter presided. He rose rapidly through the Conservative ranks during the early 1860s when many colleagues joined members of the defunct Liberal Party to form a new party. Rio Branco was sent to Uruguay in late 1864, tasked with bringing a diplomatic end to the Uruguayan War. Although successful, he was abruptly dismissed from his post. In 1869, he was recalled and dispatched to Paraguay, this time to negotiate an end to its war with Brazil. His successful efforts in concluding a peace with Paraguay were recognized, and Pedro II ennobled him, making him Viscount of Rio Branco.

== Early years ==
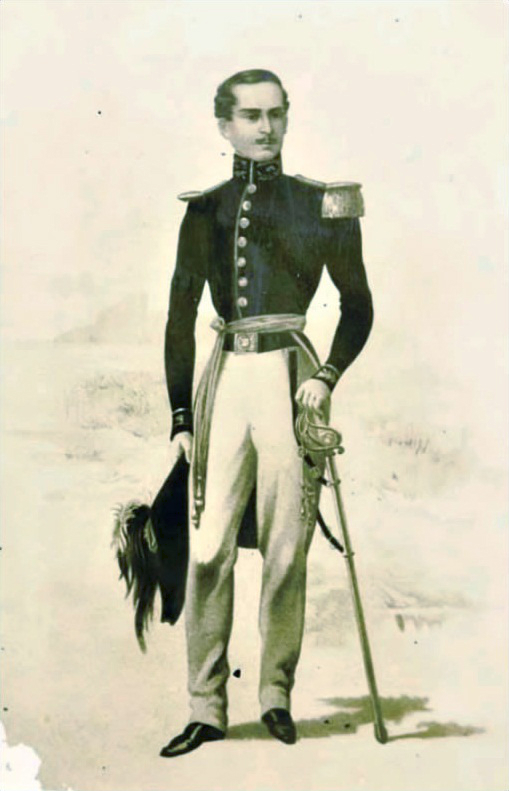
A young José Paranhos, dressed in an Army cadet uniform around 1841

Paranhos was born on 16 March 1819 in Salvador, Bahia, at a time when Brazil was a kingdom united with Portugal. His parents were Agostinho da Silva Paranhos and Josefa Emerenciana de Barreiros. Agostinho Paranhos, along with his two brothers, migrated to Brazil during the first decade of the 19th century. He became a wealthy merchant and married Josefa, the Brazilian-born daughter of one of Bahia's long-established families. Her family had roots in Porto, where Agostinho's own family had originated. Agostinho remained loyal to Portugal at the time of Brazil's Independence in 1822, which resulted in his ostracism and the collapse of his business.

José Paranhos had a simple childhood without luxury. Though his parents were no longer rich, he did not experience poverty. In later life, José fondly remembered Bahia as the "native land" of his childhood. His father died when he was still a child and his mother followed a few years later. He and his younger brothers were left in a precarious position, since the remainder of Agostinho Paranhos's fortune had been appropriated by a relative. The brothers were rescued by an uncle on their mother's side, Eusébio Gomes Barreiros, who held the rank of a colonel in the Engineer Corps. Colonel Barreiros raised his sister's children as his own and financed their education. An educated man, Barreiros had a strong influence on Paranhos's upbringing, and in later years, his nephew always spoke respectfully about his uncle.

In 1835, aged 14, Paranhos was sent to the Imperial capital, Rio de Janeiro, to continue his studies. At the beginning of the following year he was admitted into the Naval Academy. To help support his education, Paranhos tutored his classmates. In 1841, when he was 22, he graduated with the rank of midshipman, enrolling in the Army's Military Academy. He pursued a course in engineering and developed a penchant for mathematics. Prior to graduation from the Army Academy, he was promoted to second lieutenant in the Navy and became a substitute teacher in the Naval Academy. In 1842, he married Teresa de Figueiredo Faria, whose family had also come from Porto in Portugal.

After Paranhos graduated from the Military Academy in 1843 as a second lieutenant in the engineer corps, he decided to return to civilian life and focus on his career as a teacher. He became a regular instructor at the Naval Academy during 1844, conducting artillery classes. In 1845, he was transferred from the Naval Academy to the faculty of the Military Academy teaching artillery, fortification, and later, mechanics. In addition to teaching, Paranhos also became a journalist, and by 1844 was working for newspapers which supported the Liberal Party. He remained a professor in the Military Academy and began teaching political economy, statistics and administrative law in 1863. In 1874, Paranhos became the dean of the newly created Engineering School (today the Polytechnic School of the Federal University of Rio de Janeiro), a civilian branch of the Military Academy's engineering program.

== Early political career ==
=== Courtier Faction ===
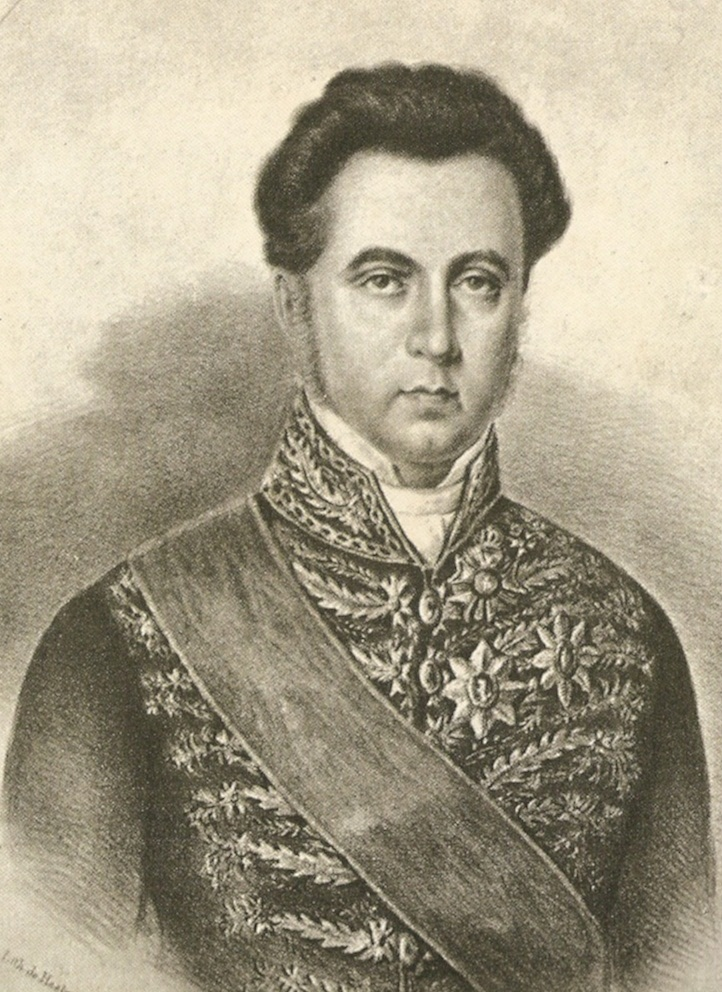
Aureliano Coutinho, Viscount of Sepetiba, leader of the Courtier Faction

Paranhos' writings for liberal newspapers attracted the attention of other Liberal Party members. He became a friend and protégé of Aureliano de Sousa e Oliveira Coutinho, later the Viscount of Sepetiba. At the time, Aureliano Coutinho was the most powerful figure in Brazilian national politics. He was the leader of the "Courtier Faction", a group—sometimes considered a wing of the Liberal Party—which had established influence over the young and inexperienced Pedro II. Members of the faction included high-ranking palace servants and notable politicians.

In 1844, the Emperor appointed Aureliano Coutinho President (governor) of Rio de Janeiro province, the richest and most important province in Brazil. With Aureliano Coutinho's patronage and strong political power base, Paranhos was elected in 1845, at age 26, to the Provincial Legislative Assembly—the provincial house of representatives. The following year, Aureliano Coutinho appointed him to be the provincial secretary, then vice-president, and later acting president. In 1847, Paranhos was elected as a general deputy, representing Rio de Janeiro in the national Chamber of Deputies.

The Courtier Faction lost favor in 1847 after it had dominated Brazilian politics for many years. As the Emperor physically matured and became more politically astute, he purged everyone linked to the group. Aureliano Coutinho, as the leader, was completely excluded from political life: "the result of an implicit, if unspoken ban imposed by Pedro II". The monarch made it clear that he would no longer tolerate being influenced by political factions. From February 1844 through May 1848, each of the four cabinets were entirely composed of Liberal Party members. Internal divisions within the Liberal Party impeded the projects designed to modernize Brazil, including education reform, construction of railroads and telegraph lines.

After the resignation of the last Liberal Cabinet, Pedro II invited the rival Conservative Party to form a new cabinet. With his party no longer in control, Paranhos lost much of his influence. The Liberal Party was not willing to accept its loss of power. The most radical faction of the Liberals in the province of Pernambuco, known as the Partido da Praia ("Party of the Beach"), openly advocated a rebellion. Nominally Liberal, the praieiros were associated with the Courtier Faction. The proposed rebellion would be an attempt of this branch of the Courtier Faction to regain control of the government. The praieiros had little support, and public opinion was also against them. The group was unable to convince the vast majority of the population that a revolt would bring them any benefits. On 2 February 1849, the limited uprising of the praieiros was completely defeated after attacking Recife, the capital of Pernambuco. Even though Paranhos had condemned it, the Praiera rebellion, combined with the downfalls of his patron and the Liberal Party, made a continued political career impossible. He turned his focus once again to his work in journalism.

=== Platine War ===
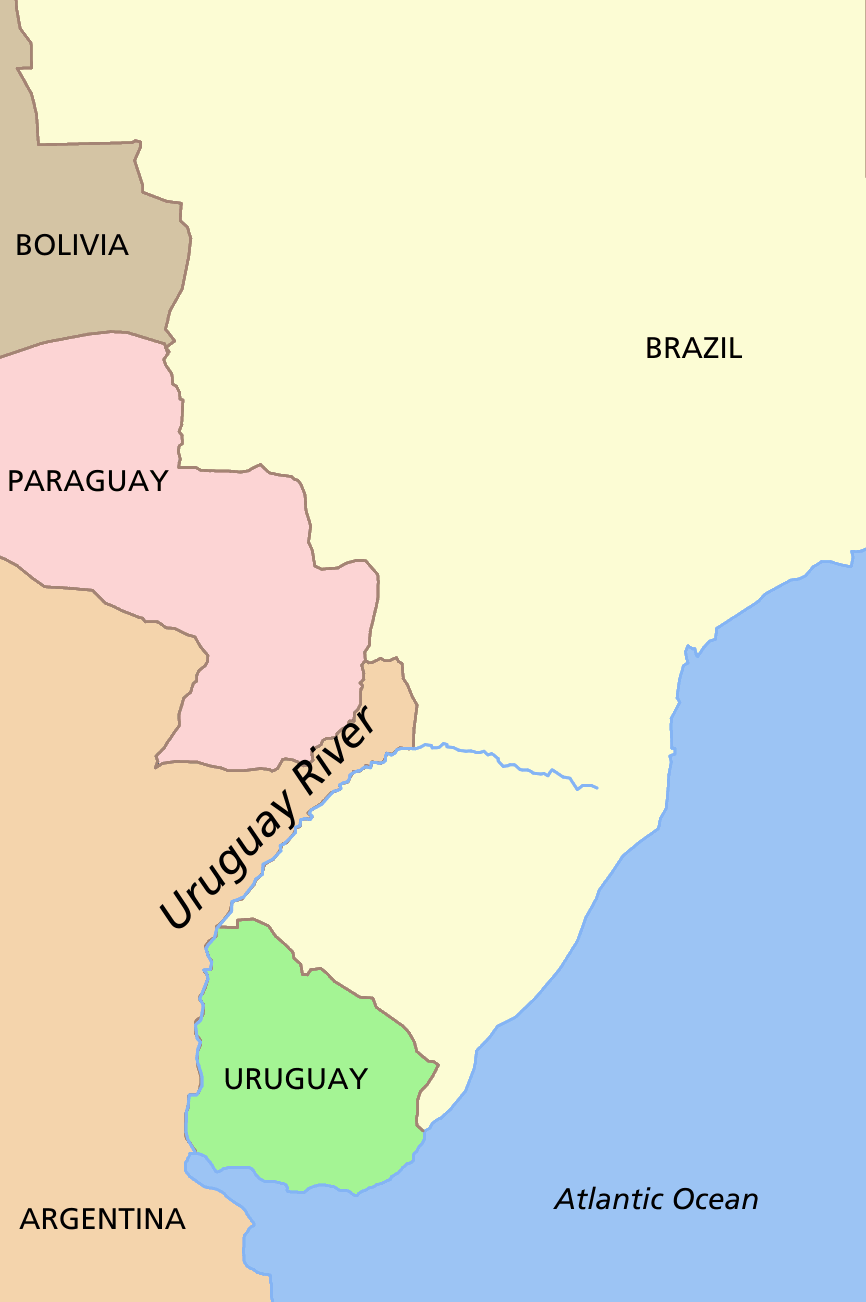
Map of the region where the Platine War occurred

After leaving politics, Paranhos quit writing for liberal newspapers and became the editor of the politically neutral Jornal do Comércio ("Commerce News"). He wrote a series of weekly articles from 1850 until the end of 1851 which were entitled "Letters to an absent friend". The column dealt with subjects that included politics, Brazilian society and day-to-day life in the Brazilian capital. Paranhos's articles soon began to focus on Brazil's foreign policy, especially Argentina and Uruguay's civil war.

Don Juan Manuel de Rosas, the dictator of Argentina, had assisted the separatist rebels in the Brazilian province of Rio Grande do Sul during the 1830s, and continued to attempt its annexation. In addition to the threat to Brazil's territorial integrity, Rosas had ambitions to conquer Paraguay, Uruguay and Bolivia. Brazil's Conservative Cabinet decided to form military alliances with the countries threatened by the dictator. On 4 September 1851, Brazil's army, commanded by Luís Alves de Lima e Silva (then Count of Caxias), crossed the border into Uruguay.

Paranhos began to write articles in support of Brazil's proactive foreign policy, which brought him close to the ruling Conservative party. The Minister of Foreign Affairs, Paulino Soares de Sousa (later the Viscount of Uruguai), appointed the Conservative Party's main leader, Honório Hermeto Carneiro Leão (later the Marquis of Paraná), as a special plenipotentiary diplomat for the Platine region. Unexpectedly, Carneiro Leão decided to take Paranhos as his secretary, passing over the more experienced members of Brazil's diplomatic corps. On 23 October 1851, both departed for Montevideo, the Uruguayan capital.

Carneiro Leão had a keen eye for spotting potential, and Paranhos—who had revealed himself a very capable man during his tenure as a Liberal politician in Rio de Janeiro province—had talents which could be put to use. As Carneiro Leão told Paranhos when justifying his choice of the young and inexperienced journalist: "I consulted no one about appointing you. What influenced my mind was your merit, which I prize: I hope, sir, that you will prove I got it right." Paranhos was a handsome and charming man, tall at 1.95 meters (6 ft 4.8 in), with blue eyes and golden hair. Historian Jeffrey D. Needell remarked that in Paranhos, Carneiro Leão had "a man with marked literary skill, with a military background and unusually fine technical knowledge, with political instincts and proven political courage, and with a clear need for a new patron, with Aureliano [Coutinho]'s recent eclipse". That, along with cool-headedness, outstanding oratory skills, inexhaustible energy, and a gifted and cultured mind, made him seem the ideal person for the post.

The two men arrived in Montevideo for negotiations on 2 November. On the 21st of the same month, Carneiro Leão signed a treaty of alliance with Uruguay and the rebel Argentine provinces of Entre Ríos and Corrientes. A Brazilian division, along with Uruguayan and Argentine rebel troops, invaded Argentina. On 3 February 1852, the allies defeated an army led by Rosas, who fled to the United Kingdom. To Needell, Paranhos "quickly adapted his own skills to the necessities of the mission. He demonstrated not only the intelligence and verbal ability expected, but a surprisingly rapid grasp of the issues and the actors, handling the complications with élan, showing a flair for decision, a capacity for work, an eye for details, and an instinct for imposing himself that won Honório [Hermeto]'s decided approval and, after some hesitation (allegedly because Paranhos was a novice, to Paulino Soares's way of thinking), the support of Paulino [Soares]." An ally of Brazil against Rosas who went on to become President of Argentina in 1862, Bartolomé Mitre would recall decades later that Paranhos had been the "soul" of the successful diplomatic mission headed by Carneiro Leão.

== Into the Conservative Party ==
=== Conciliation ===
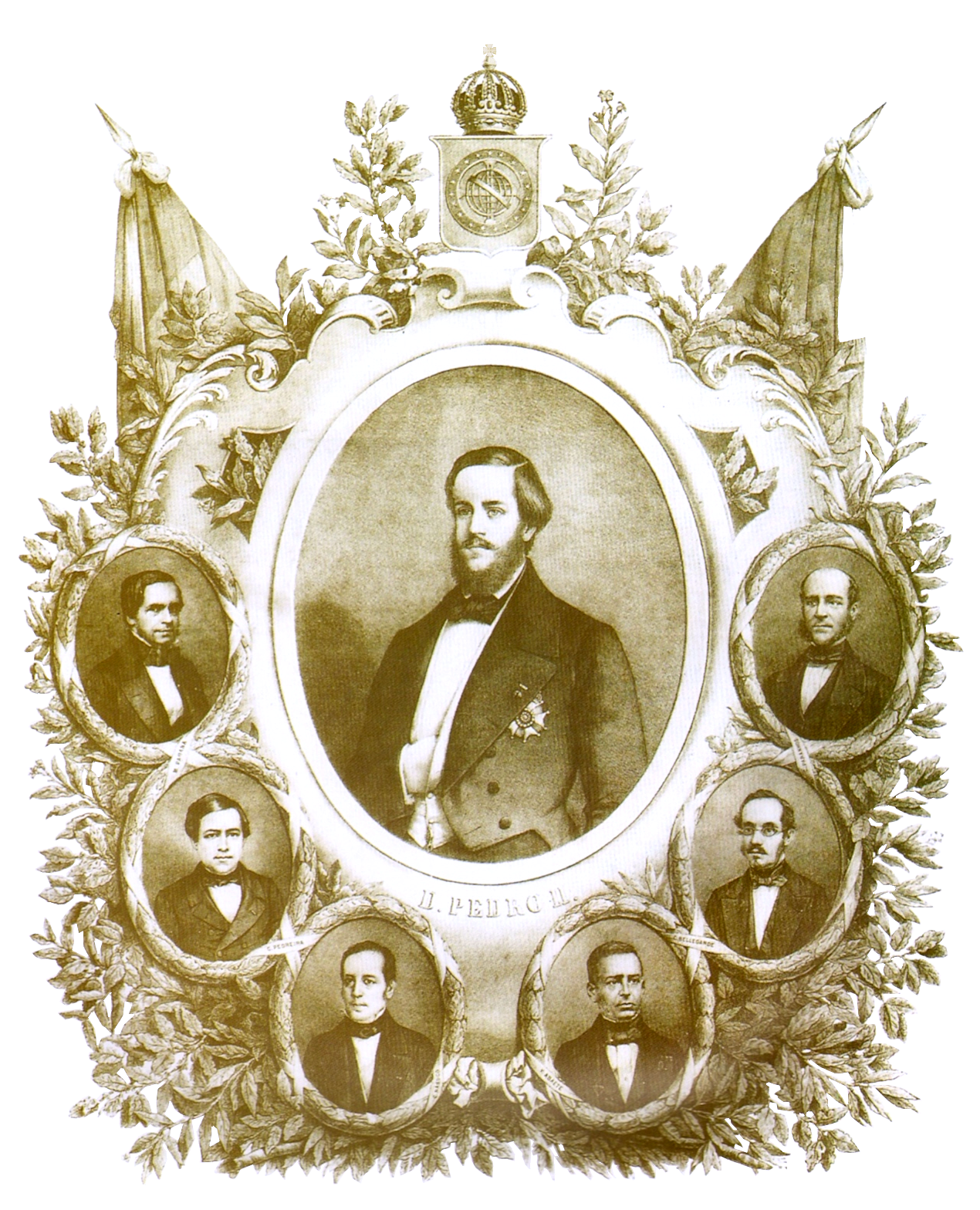
The Conciliation Cabinet. Emperor Dom Pedro II in the center; Carneiro Leão at the far left; and Paranhos (bald since the middle of the 1840s) on the far right

Paranhos was left behind when Carneiro Leão returned to Brazil, having been named Brazil's diplomatic minister to Uruguay. Paranhos' time in Uruguay allowed him to acquire an understanding of the dynamics characterizing Hispanic American nations of the period. Intermittent crises leading to and resulting from coups, government by dictators, political factionalism and civil wars were commonplace among these countries. A penchant for, and skill in, diplomacy became evident during his stay—as a pleased Viscount of Uruguai, still Minister of Foreign Affairs, noted in February 1853: "In a general manner, I approve of what our diplomatic representatives do; however, it almost always seems to me that, were I in their places, I would have done better. But with Dr. Paranhos that thought does not occur to me. Every time I read his communiqués, I tell myself: 'This is precisely what I would have done or said.'"

On 6 September 1853, Carneiro Leão was appointed President of the Council of Ministers and charged with organizing a new cabinet. Emperor Pedro II wished to advance an ambitious plan, which became known as "the Conciliation". The goal of the Conciliation was to put an end to the periodic eruption of armed conflicts between political factions, such as had occurred in the Praieira rebellion. It had become usual for parties which had lost power in elections to seize back control using force. The Conciliation aimed to strengthen the role of parliament in settling the country's political disputes. Both parties would be required to agree to rise above partisan politics and instead devote themselves to the common good of the nation.

The new President invited several Liberals to join the Conservative ranks and went so far as to name some as ministers. One of these was Paranhos, who took the Foreign Affairs portfolio. He was still in Montevideo when he learned that Carneiro Leão had succeeded in having him elected a general deputy in 1853. The new cabinet, albeit highly successful, was plagued from the beginning by strong opposition from Conservative Party members who repudiated the new recruits from the Liberal side, believing that these did not truly share the party's ideals and were mainly interested in gaining public offices. Despite the mistrust, Carneiro Leão demonstrated great resilience in fending off threats and overcoming obstacles and setbacks.

After the sudden and unexpected death of Carneiro Leão in September 1856, his cabinet only managed to survive him by a few months. The Emperor, although critical of the way the Conciliation had been implemented, had learned to appreciate its merits and was eager that it continue. Pedro II's support gave the Conciliation another chance, and allowed Paranhos to return to government once more as Foreign Minister on 12 December 1858. The most pressing issue facing Paranhos was the Paraguayan government's persistent refusal to allow Brazilian ships access to Mato Grosso province. At that time, the best and fastest way to reach that distant Brazilian province was to travel via the Atlantic and from there up the rivers which flow between the nations south of Brazil. One of the reasons for Brazil's war against Argentina in 1851 was to assure the free passage of its ships. The crisis between Brazil and Paraguay had dragged on since Paranhos's tenure as Foreign Minister in Carneiro Leão's cabinet. On 12 February 1858, Paranhos signed a treaty with Paraguay which allowed Brazilian ships unrestricted navigation of Paraguayan rivers. This prevented the outbreak of war—or at least deferred the conflict until 1864.

=== Rise of the Progressive League ===
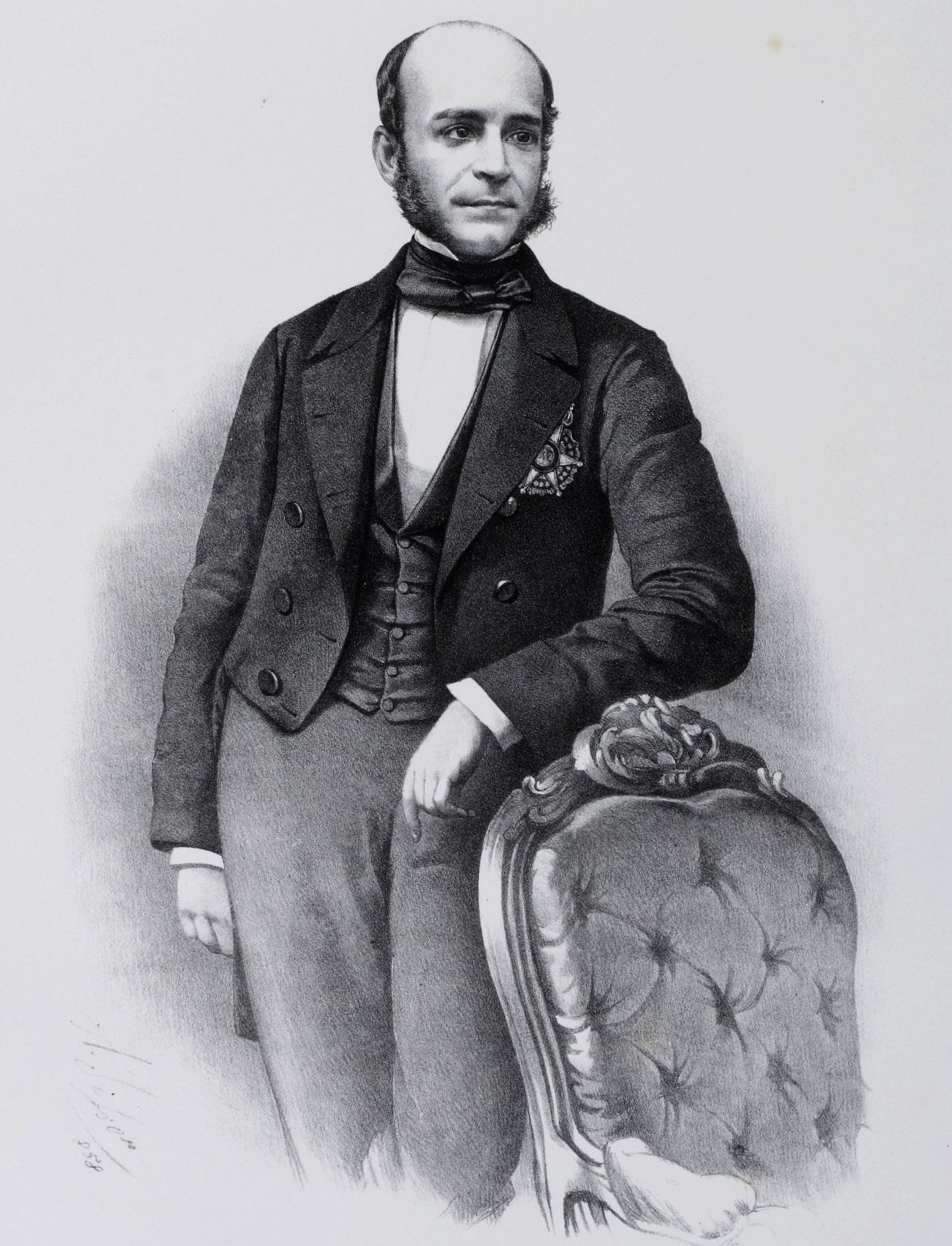
José Paranhos around the age of 39, c. 1858

The ultraconservatives who opposed the Conciliation policy were led by the Viscount of Itaboraí, Eusébio de Queirós and the Viscount of Uruguai. These elder statesmen were of the same generation as the late Carneiro Leão and had taken the leadership of the Conservative Party after his death. Although conservative in name, they had repeatedly proven more progressive in many areas than their rivals, the Liberals. The Viscount of Uruguai had been Paranhos's protector since the 1851 diplomatic mission and greatly influenced his protégé, who stood by the ultraconservatives. Paranhos managed to persuade Luís Alves de Lima e Silva (who had been commander-in-chief during the Platine War, his colleague as War Minister in the Conciliation Cabinet, and later the Duke of Caxias) to stay on the side of the Conservative Party's old guard.

During the years following 1857, none of the cabinets survived long. They quickly collapsed due to the lack of a majority in the Chamber of Deputies. The Conservative Party had split down the middle: on one side were the ultraconservatives, and on the other, the moderate conservatives. In the wake of Carneiro Leão's cabinet, a new generation of politicians had emerged, eager to acquire more power inside the Conservative Party. Paranhos belonged to this younger age group. These men saw their path to the top ranks as being blocked by the Conservative elders, who would not easily relinquish control.

Remaining members of the Liberal Party, which had languished since the Praieira rebellion in 1849, took advantage of the Conservative Party's apparently impending dissolution to return to national politics with renewed strength. They delivered a powerful blow to the government when they managed to win several seats in the Chamber of Deputies in 1860. The Emperor asked the Marquis (later Duke) of Caxias to head a new cabinet on 2 March 1861. Caxias chose Paranhos as his Minister of Finance (and interim Minister of Foreign Affairs), and he soon became the Marquis's right hand. His influence became so great that the ministry became known as the "Caxias-Paranhos Cabinet".

The new government was faced with a major challenge: the Chamber of Deputies was divided into three groups: the ultraconservatives, the Moderates and the Liberals. Paranhos and Caxias named men who were either ultraconservatives or Moderates to the remaining portfolios, in an attempt to weaken the reinvigorated Liberal opposition and consolidate a workable governing majority. Despite successfully recruiting enough supporters from outside the party to form a government, the Cabinet was hobbled from the outset by its lack of internal unity. It was doomed when Paranhos's friend and former colleague in the Conciliation Cabinet, José Tomás Nabuco de Araújo, delivered a speech advocating a merger of Moderate Conservatives and Liberals into a truly new political party.

So enthusiastically well-received was this speech, that both groups voted together as a single, cohesive faction, leaving the government without a majority. The Cabinet requested that the Emperor dissolve the Chamber and call for new elections, but he refused. With no remaining alternative, the ministers resigned, and on 24 May 1862 Pedro II named a member of the Moderate-Liberal coalition to form a new cabinet. The new political party, of which the majority of members were former Conservatives, was called the "Progressive League". The new cabinet marked the end of 14 years of Conservative dominance in national politics. The defeat was not a total loss for Paranhos, since he was named lifetime Senator for Mato Grosso province by the Emperor in November 1862, after having garnered the most votes in the provincial election. He took office as Senator on 5 March 1863. (Note: In Imperial Brazil, the Emperor could select a new Senator from a list of the three candidates who had received the highest number of popular votes. (Dias 1969, p. 579))

== Diplomat ==
=== Mission to Paraguay ===
In January 1858 Paranhos was sent to Asunción to procure Paraguayan compliance with an 1856 treaty which was supposed to give Brazil the right to navigate the Paraguay River in order to access her province of Mato Grosso. The government of Paraguay had been obstructing the passage. His diplomatic style was described thus in Professor Whigham's The Paraguayan War:

The councillor cut an impressive figure. He was well over six-foot tall with piercing sky-blue eyes. His resplendent diplomat's uniform, which he used on all occasions, shone brightly with gold brocade and included a high collar with white gloves, even in the tropical heat. Such fashion was calculated to give him a larger-than-life presence, symbolic of the enormous empire he represented. Paraguayans were sensitive to subtleties in appearance and they understood such an image... In appearance he suggested a modern European statesman, a man who combined shrewdness and easy familiarity with power...

The empire was willing, Paranhos stated bluntly, to go to war to enforce the 1856 treaty. Francisco Solano López [representing the Paraguayan government] chose to take the councillor's threat at face value. On 12 February 1858 the two men signed a convention that ended the restrictions ...

=== Uruguayan War ===
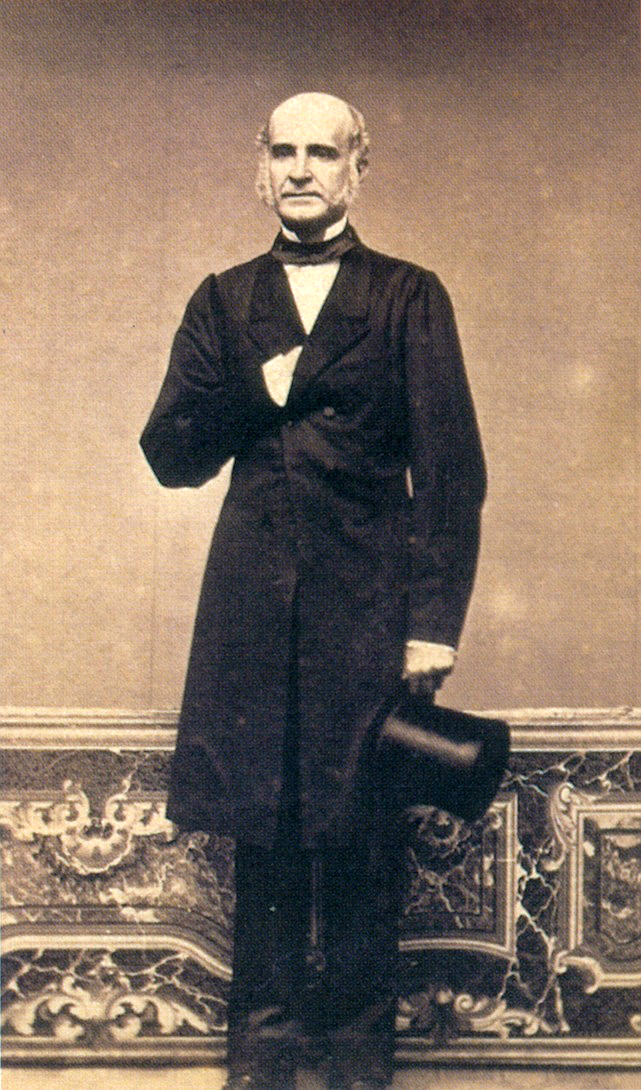
Paranhos around the age of 45, c. 1864

Another civil war had begun in Uruguay which pitted its political parties against one another. The internal conflict led to the murder of Brazilians and the looting of their Uruguayan properties. Brazil's Progressive Cabinet decided to intervene and dispatched an army, which invaded Uruguay in December 1864, beginning the brief Uruguayan War.

The dictator of Paraguay, Francisco Solano López, took advantage of the Uruguayan situation during late 1864 to establish his nation as a regional power. On 11 November of that year, he ordered a Brazilian civilian steamship seized, triggering the Paraguayan War. Then in December, the Paraguayan army invaded the Brazilian province of Mato Grosso (currently the state of Mato Grosso do Sul). Four months later, Paraguayan troops invaded Argentine territory as a prelude to an attack upon the Brazilian province of Rio Grande do Sul.

What had seemed a simple military intervention of short duration led to a full-scale war in South America's southeast. The Progressive Cabinet named Paranhos plenipotentiary minister. His mission was to end the conflict with Uruguay so that Brazil could focus on the far more serious threat posed by Paraguay. He arrived in the Argentine capital, Buenos Aires, on 2 December 1864. Paranhos signed a peace treaty with the Uruguayan government on 20 February 1865, ending the war. Paranhos not only managed to bring about peace, but he concurrently forged an alliance between Brazil, Argentina and the Uruguayan rebels (who formed Uruguay's postwar government) against Paraguay. The pact would later be officially signed as the Treaty of the Triple Alliance.

The Commander-in-Chief of the Brazilian forces, Admiral Joaquim Marques Lisboa (then Baron and later Marquis of Tamandaré), himself a Progressive, complained to the Brazilian Cabinet of the outcome engineered by Paranhos. By the time the peace treaty was concluded, the Uruguayan capital was under siege by Brazilian troops and under blockade by the Brazilian fleet. The admiral and the Cabinet were eager for an end to the conflict which would have resulted in a conquest of the enemy capital and a consequent boost in the popularity of the Brazilian government. Paranhos, however, had preempted such an outcome. As retaliation for the bloodless conclusion, he was fired from his post. Returning to Brazil, he defended himself in the Senate: "Say [...] whatever you want about the diplomatic act of 20 February; you will not be able to take away from me this grateful conviction: that through that solution I saved the life of 2,000 fellow compatriots, [and] avoided the destruction of an important capital". Nonetheless, he received accolades in Uruguay, Brazil and even Argentina for his accomplishment in engineering both an end to the war and the formation of the alliance.

=== Paraguayan War ===
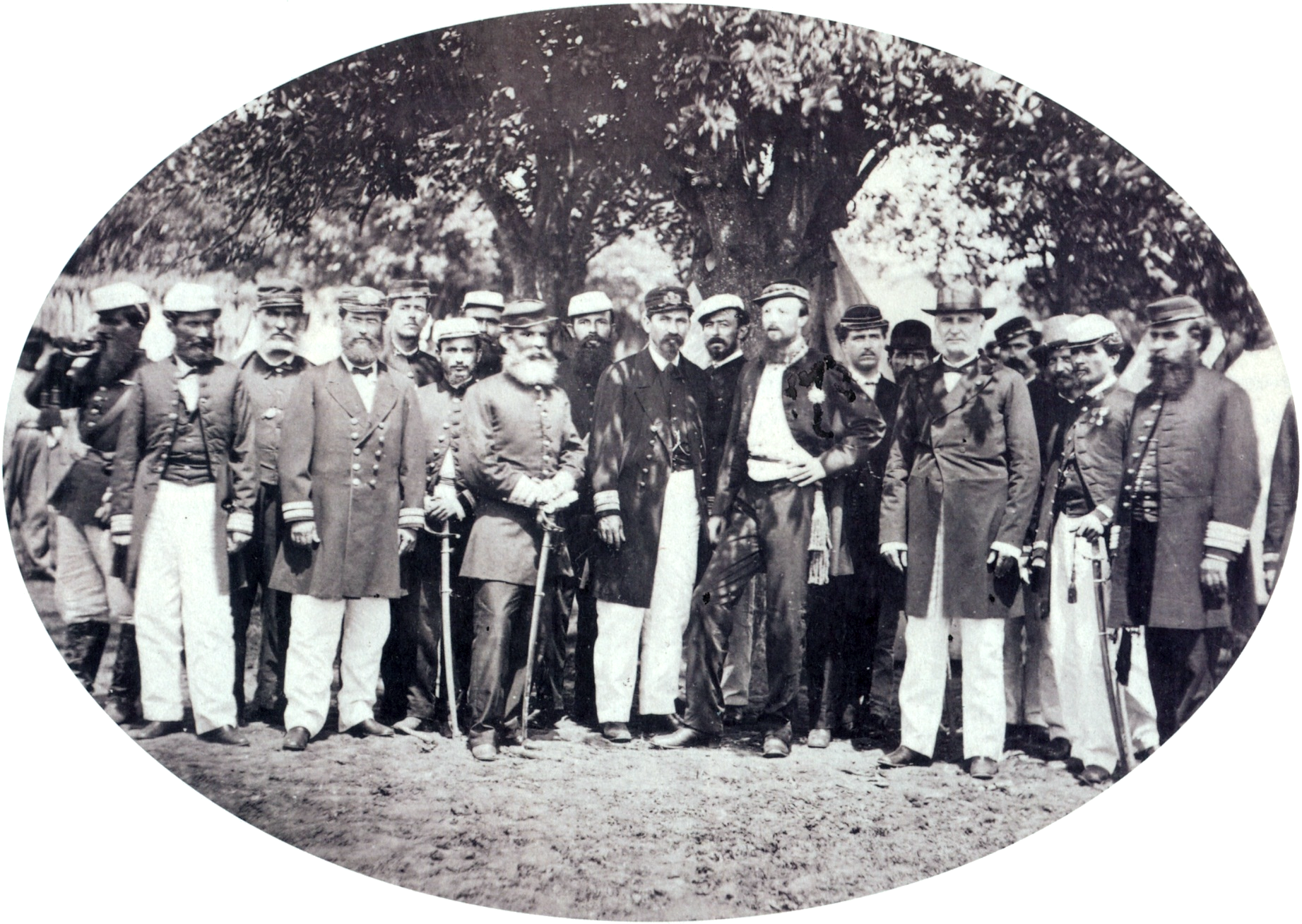
The Count of Eu (with his hand on his waist) with José Paranhos (to his left, in light trousers) and Alfredo d'Escragnolle Taunay (between them) among Brazilian officers, 1870

From its inception, the Progressive League was plagued by internal conflict between Progressives (former Moderate Conservatives) and Historicals (former Liberals). All of the cabinets formed by the League after 1862 were short-lived. The Paraguayan invasion in 1864 led to a conflict far longer than expected, increasing tensions within the party. By 1868, a rift had opened between the Marquis of Caxias (then Commander-in-Chief of Brazilian forces in the war) and the Progressive Cabinet. With its credibility for prosecuting the war now vanished, the Cabinet resigned and the Emperor called the Conservatives back into power on 16 July 1868. Once again Paranhos—who was extraordinary member of the Council of State since 18 August 1866—became Minister of Foreign Affairs.

The rise of the Conservative Party impelled the Progressives and Historicals to unify—something they had not been able to achieve while in power. The Progressive-Historical coalition was rechristened as the Liberal Party (the third bloc bearing this name in Brazil's history (Note: The first Liberal Party appeared in 1826. It was a very loose coalition between the Coimbra bloc (the core of what would later become the Conservative Party), Nativists and Radicals. It disappeared in 1831 with the abdication of Pedro I. (Sisson 1999, p. 288) The second Liberal Party appeared around 1837 when the Coimbra bloc became the governing party. It was an alliance between Nativists, Radicals and former Restorationists (politicians who proposed the return of Pedro I as regent during his son's minority) and lasted until 1849 when the Praieira revolt was crushed. (Needell 2006, p. 81) For further information see History of the Empire of Brazil.)). Its most radical wing would declare itself republican in 1870—an ominous signal to the monarchy.

Paraguay's capital, Asunción, was occupied on 1 January 1869, and there was a widespread belief that the war was nearing an end. On 1 February 1869, Paranhos departed for Asunción as plenipotentiary minister with the goal of concluding a peace treaty. Paranhos brought along his eldest son (one of nine), José Maria da Silva Paranhos Júnior (later Baron of Rio Branco (Note: "The Brazilian nobility was only lifelong .... The title extinguished itself with the death of the bearer. The son of the noble would only become a noble through his own merits, as was the case of the son of the Viscount of Rio Branco, José da Silva Paranhos, created Baron after the death of his father." —Heitor Lyra (Lyra 1977, Vol 2, p. 39))), as his secretary. Their relationship would later break down due to an affair between the son and a Belgian actress which produced several children. Although the couple eventually resided together, they never married, and no formal acknowledgement was ever made of her existence or that of his children. Paranhos strongly disapproved of his son's personal life, which was considered scandalous by 19th century Brazilian society. Long after his father's death and after Brazil had become a republic, the junior Paranhos would go on to a distinguished career as Minister of Foreign Affairs. He has come to be regarded as one of the nation's greatest heroes due to his pivotal role in securing the country's international boundaries, and has been officially designated as the Patrono (a type of "patron saint") of Brazilian Diplomacy.

The diplomatic mission arrived in Asunción on 20 February 1869. Asunción was then a small town of unpaved streets and many buildings constructed of little more than straw. With Paraguayan dictator Francisco Solano López on the run, the country lacked a government. Paranhos had to create a provisional government which could sign a peace accord and recognize the border claimed by Brazil between the two nations. Even with Paraguay devastated, the power vacuum resulting from López's overthrow was quickly filled by emerging domestic factions which Paranhos had to accommodate. According to historian Francisco Doratioto, Paranhos, "the then-greatest Brazilian specialist on Platine (Note: A generic term to describe the area between Argentina, Paraguay, Uruguay and Brazil. The name comes from Río de la Plata ("River Plate"), a river and estuary located between Argentina and Uruguay.) affairs", had a "decisive" role in creating a democratic Paraguayan government. (Note: The members of the provisional government were elected by Paraguayans. From 1811 (when Paraguay became independent) until 1869, the nation had only authoritarian governments headed by three consecutive dictators: José Gaspar Rodríguez de Francia (1813–40), Carlos Antonio López (1840–62) and Francisco Solano López (1862–69). (Doratioto 2002, p. 427)) Paraguay thus survived as an independent nation. Later, on 20 June 1870, preliminary peace protocols were signed. The final peace treaty accepting Brazilian claims was signed in January 1872.

While in Paraguay, Paranhos had to deal with another serious issue. Gaston d'Orléans, Count of Eu—grandson of King Louis Philippe I of France and husband of Emperor Pedro II's daughter and heir Dona Isabel—had succeeded Caxias as Commander-in-Chief of Brazilian forces. After a brilliant beginning which included victories over the remnants of López's army, the Count fell into depression. Paranhos became the unacknowledged, de facto commander-in-chief. López was found and killed on 1 March 1870, bringing the war to an end. On 20 June 1870 the Emperor granted Paranhos the title of Viscount of Rio Branco ("White River", the name of a river that Paraguay claimed as its border with Brazil) with the added Grandeza ("Greatness") distinction. After returning to Brazil, Rio Branco became an ordinary member of the Council of State on 20 October 1870.

== President of the Council of Ministers ==
=== Longest-serving prime minister ===
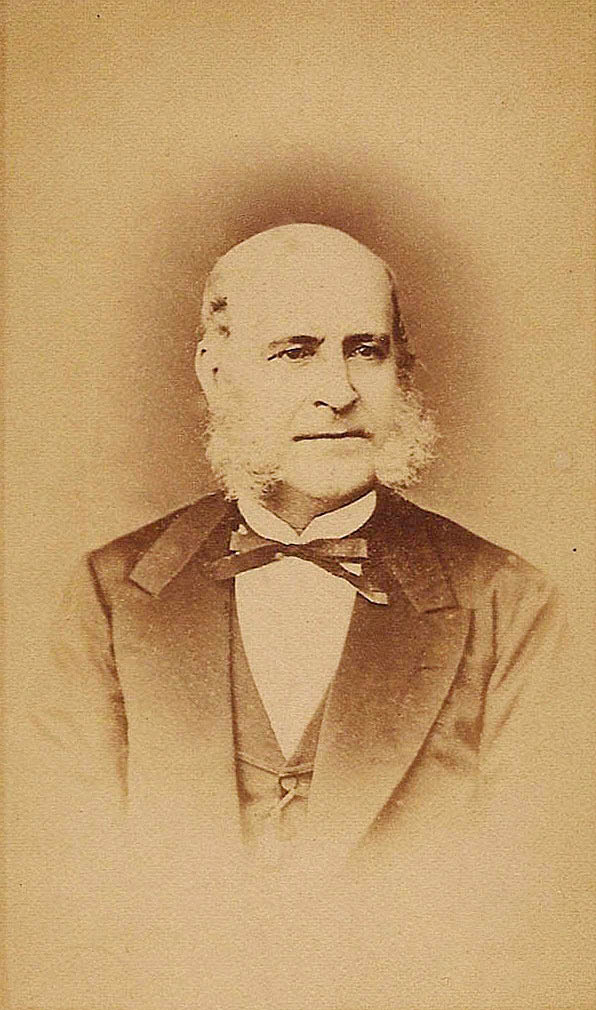
José Paranhos, the Viscount of Rio Branco in his daily outfit c. 1871

While still in Paraguay, Rio Branco was recalled, having been told in advance that the Emperor intended to offer him the office of President of the Council of Ministers (Prime Minister). Pedro II was maneuvering to pass a controversial bill which would immediately declare children born to slave women as free. The Empire which Rio Branco was asked to govern had undergone great changes since he had begun his career in politics. Decades of internal peace, political stability and economic prosperity had brought about a situation where everything "seemed set fair for the future"—although time would prove otherwise. The end of the war against Paraguay ushered in what is considered the "Golden Age" and apogee of the Brazilian Empire. Brazil's international reputation for political steadiness, progressiveness and investment potential greatly improved and, with the exception of the United States, was unequalled by any other American nation. The economy began undergoing rapid growth, and immigration flourished. Railroad, shipping and other modernization projects were adopted. With an end to slavery on the horizon "and other reforms projected, the prospects for 'moral and material advances' seemed vast."

Pedro II planned a trip to Europe which would result in his absence for almost a year. In his place, his daughter and heir Isabel became Regent. Since she was young and inexperienced, Rio Branco could not rely on Imperial intervention to help push through passage of the Emperor's anti-slavery legislation. By this time, the Conservative elders were no more, (Note: The first Viscount of Uruguai died on 15 July 1866, (Vainfas 2002, p. 567) Eusébio de Queirós on 7 May 1868, (Vainfas 2002, p. 246) and the Viscount of Itaboraí followed them on 8 January 1872. (Vainfas 2002, p. 408)) and he had risen to lead the Conservative Party. (Note: The other two leaders were the Duke of Caxias and the Baron of Cotejipe. Both were, as had been Rio Branco, ministers in the Conciliation Cabinet. With the death of Rio Branco and Caxias in 1880, Cotejipe became sole leader of the Conservative Party until his own death in early 1889. (Lyra 1977, Vol 3, p. 74)) Rio Branco formed his Cabinet on 7 March 1871 and it would last until 25 June 1875—the second longest in the Empire's history. Rio Branco became the longest-serving prime minister. (Note: The Conservative Cabinet formed on 29 September 1848 lasted until 6 September 1853 (albeit with different presidents), when the Marquis of Paraná was named as head the Conciliation Cabinet. (Nabuco 1975, p. 711)(Barman 1999, p. 249)) With a single exception, all ministers he appointed were young and inexperienced. Only one achieved prominence: João Alfredo Correia de Oliveira, who as President of the Council of Ministers would, on 13 May 1888, secure passage of the law that extinguished the last vestiges of slavery in Brazil.

=== Law of Free Birth ===
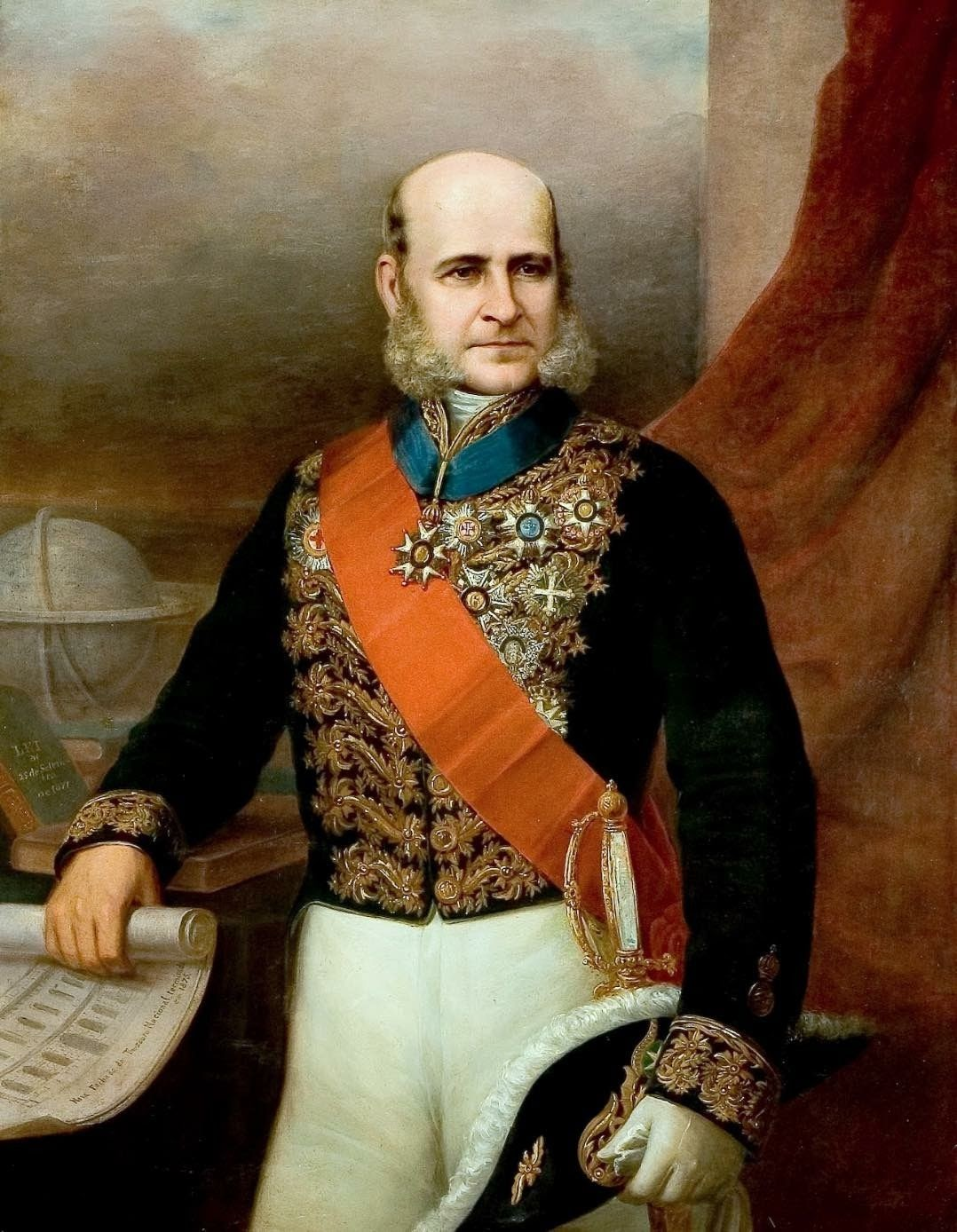
The Viscount of Rio Branco in court dress, 1875.

The bill to set free all children born of slave women (and thus limit the tenure of slavery to the lifetimes of those slaves then alive) was introduced in the Chamber of Deputies on 12 May 1871. It faced "a determined opposition, which commanded support from about one-third of the deputies and which sought to organize public opinion against the measure." According to historian José Murilo de Carvalho, Rio Branco "had to use all his extraordinary energy and leadership skills to convince the deputies", as there was opposition from influential members of both the Conservatives and Liberals. He delivered 21 speeches, in both the Chamber of Deputies and the Senate, advocating approval of the legislation. The abolition of slavery was strongly opposed by the ruling circles. Even Rio Branco had earlier opposed the proposal, fearing its impact on national stability, though after 1867 he became convinced the measure was necessary.

The legislation was only forced through the Chamber of Deputies by repeated use of cloture to move the process forward. Only in late August was the bill finalized and forwarded to the Senate for consideration. The Senate finally passed the measure on 27 September 1871. Isabel signed the legislation on the following day, and it became known as the "Law of Free Birth". According to historian Lidia Besouchet, at that moment "no one had more popularity than Rio Branco" anywhere in Brazil. Articles praising him and telling the story of his life and career appeared in newspapers in the United States, Argentina, the United Kingdom, France, Italy, Portugal, Spain, and other foreign nations. To Besouchet, its passage was the apogee of Rio Branco's career.

Despite the accolades, the law's passage had seriously damaged the long-term prospects of the Empire. It "split the Conservatives down the middle, one party faction backed the reforms of the Rio Branco Cabinet, while the second—known as the escravocratas [slavocrats]—were unrelenting in their opposition". The latter were ultraconservatives, led by Paulino José Soares de Sousa Jr., the 2nd Viscount of Uruguai. (Note: This was the son of the 1st Viscount of Uruguai and nephew of the Viscount of Itaboraí. He considered himself the legitimate successor of the Conservative triumvirate. (Nabuco 1975, p. 741)) The legislation, and Pedro II's support for it, resulted in these ultraconservatives no longer being unconditionally loyal to the monarchy.

The Conservative Party had previously experienced serious division during the 1850s, when the Emperor's complete support for the Conciliation policy gave rise to the Progressives. The difference then was that ultraconservatives who opposed Conciliation (led by Eusébio, Uruguai and Itaboraí) perceived the Emperor as being indispensable to the functioning of the political system: an ultimate and impartial arbiter when deadlock threatened. This new generation of ultraconservatives, unlike their predecessors, had no experience of the Regency and early years of Pedro II's reign, when external and internal dangers threatened the nation's existence. They had only known a stable administration and prosperity. The young politicians saw no reason to uphold and defend the Imperial office as a unifying force beneficial to the nation. Unbeknownst to Rio Branco and Pedro II, both had prepared the path to the Empire's later downfall.

Reaching beyond the slavery issue, the Cabinet advanced several measures to address calls for political and administrative reform. However, all of these—including the Law of Free Birth—were only partially effective due to various loopholes. Although declared freeborn, children born to slave mothers were kept, even after the law's enactment, under the control of slaveowners until age twenty-one. It is true that "unable to reproduce itself, slavery would eventually disappear", but the status quo was preserved for at least two decades. In effect, as historian Roderick J. Barman summarized it, the "law changed everything and it changed nothing". Other reforms also had shortcomings. The police reform legislation of 1871 theoretically limited the police's powers to imprison arbitrarily and protected civil liberties, although they generally ignored these constraints.

=== Religious Issue ===
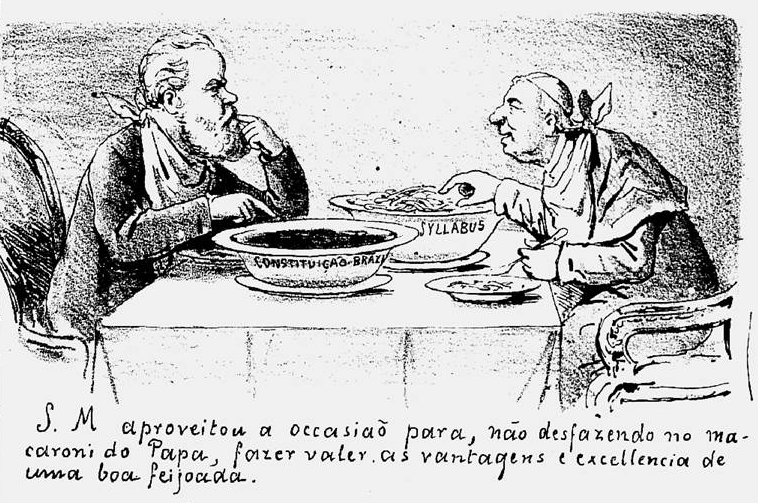
A caricature satirizing the Religious Question. The caption says: "Not neglecting the Pope's macaroni, His Majesty took the opportunity to enforce the advantages and the excellence of a good feijoada".

Meanwhile, the government had to deal with a serious and protracted crisis involving the Catholic Church. Catholicism was the state religion in Brazil, and there was a great degree of state control which had been inherited from Portuguese rule, this included the appointment of clergy. This situation led to a state of affairs where the Catholic clergy were seen as being understaffed, undisciplined and poorly educated, leading to a loss of moral authority and popular respect for the Church. There had been a series of measures aiming to weaken the authority of the Papacy over the Brazilian church including the suspension of the acceptance of novices into monasteries in 1856 and the introduction of a right of appeal to the crown over most church affairs in 1857, neither of which were accepted by Rome.

The Imperial government wanted to reform the church and appointed a series of well educated, reforming bishops. Although these bishops agreed with the government on the need to reform, they did not share Pedro II's views on the subservience of the Church to government and tended to be influenced by Ultramontanism which emphasised loyalty to the Papacy over loyalty to the civil powers.

One of the new generation of bishops was the bishop of Olinda, Dom Vital de Oliveira. In 1872, he expelled Freemasons from lay brotherhoods. All forms of Freemasonry had long been forbidden to all Catholics under pain of excommunication.

Rio Branco was grand master of the Grande Oriente do Brasil, the largest Brazilian Masonic body. It is not known exactly when or how Rio Branco became a Freemason, but he had been a member since at least 1840. Brazilian Masonry was not seen as being as hostile to the church as Latin Freemasonry on the Continent of Europe. In the view of one historian, neither "the president of the Council nor his associates could be accused of atheism or hostility to religion".

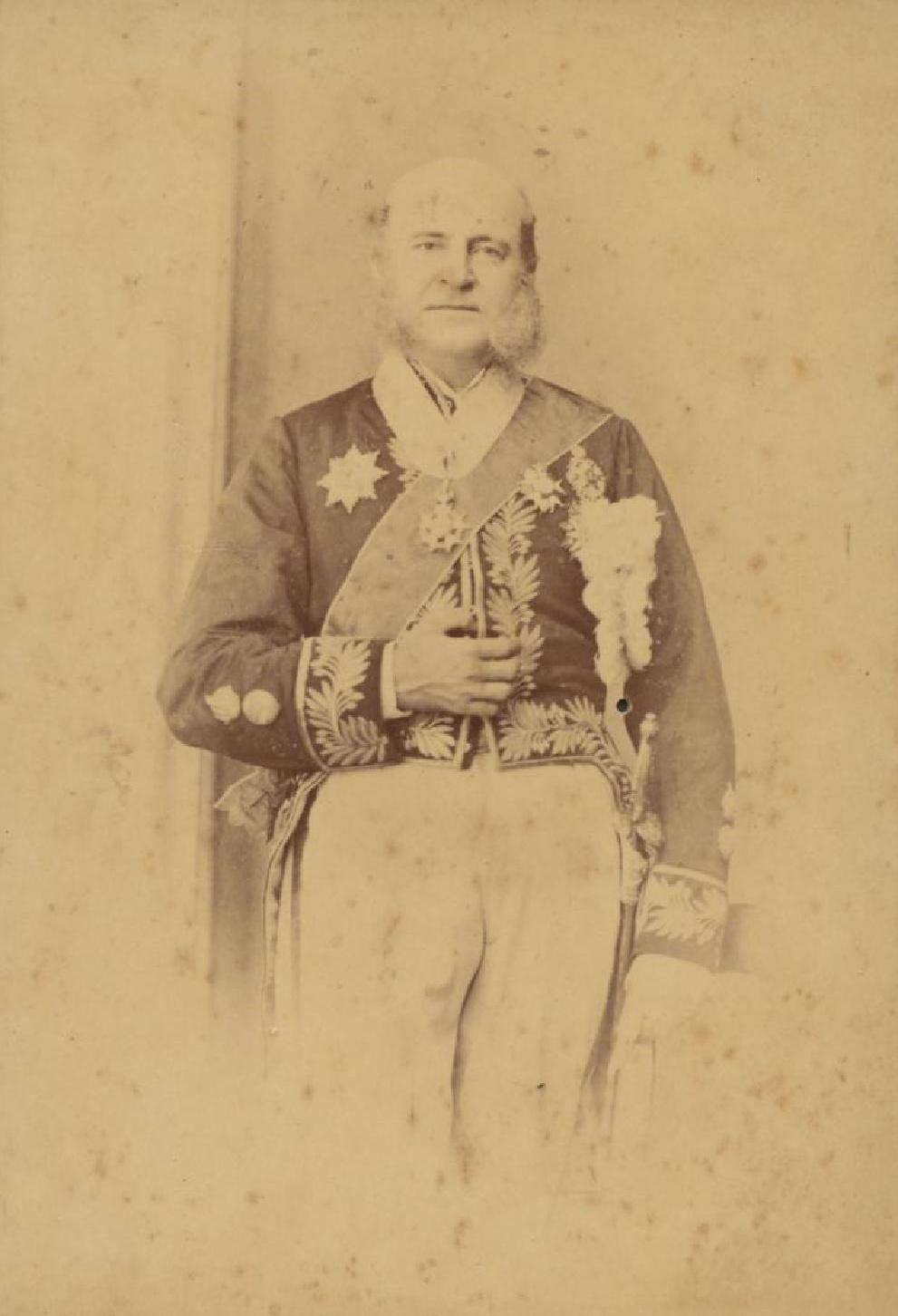
José Paranhos, the Viscount of Rio Branco in court dress c. 1875

The government came down on the side of the Freemasons and against the church, ordering Dom Vital to rescind the interdict, which he refused. This refusal led to the bishops being tried before the Supreme Court of Justice of the Empire where in 1874 they were convicted and sentenced to four years of hard labor which was commuted to imprisonment without hard labor. Rio Branco explained in a letter written in August 1873 that he believed the government "could not compromise in the affair" since "it involved principles essential to the social order and to national sovereignty". These actions aligned with his own views, but his convictions were bolstered by the Emperor's identical conclusions. Pedro II regarded Rio Branco as his favorite politician and a second-in-command on whom he could rely. The Emperor played a decisive role by unequivocally backing the government's actions in moving against the bishops. The lack of independence shown by Rio Branco in relation to Pedro II was strongly criticized by historian Roderick J. Barman, who believed that the Prime Minister only enforced policies that did not displease the Emperor or which had his full support. The trial and imprisonment of the two bishops was very unpopular,.

The imposition of the metric system resulted in demonstrations in the northeast during 1874. Metric weights and measures were destroyed by peasants, and land and tax records were burned. The movement was called Quebra Quilos ("Smash the Kilos") and did not have any lasting impact—although it illustrated popular dissatisfaction and was an embarrassment to the government."

The Quebra Quilo riots were suspected of being condoned by priests, and together with the arrest of the bishops, drew attention to the Imperial government having become embroiled in a no-win dispute. The crisis would only be smoothed over by the replacement of the Cabinet in September 1875 and the Emperor's reluctant grant of a full amnesty to the bishops. Historian Heitor Lyra blamed Rio Branco and his Cabinet, both bishops and, primarily, Pedro II for the ordeal. All parties involved revealed a lack of tact, and their intransigence only caused harm—mostly to the monarchy itself. The main consequence of the crisis was that the clergy no longer saw any benefit in upholding Pedro II. Although they abandoned the Emperor, most eagerly awaited the accession of his eldest daughter and heir Isabel because of her Ultramontane views.

== Later years and death ==
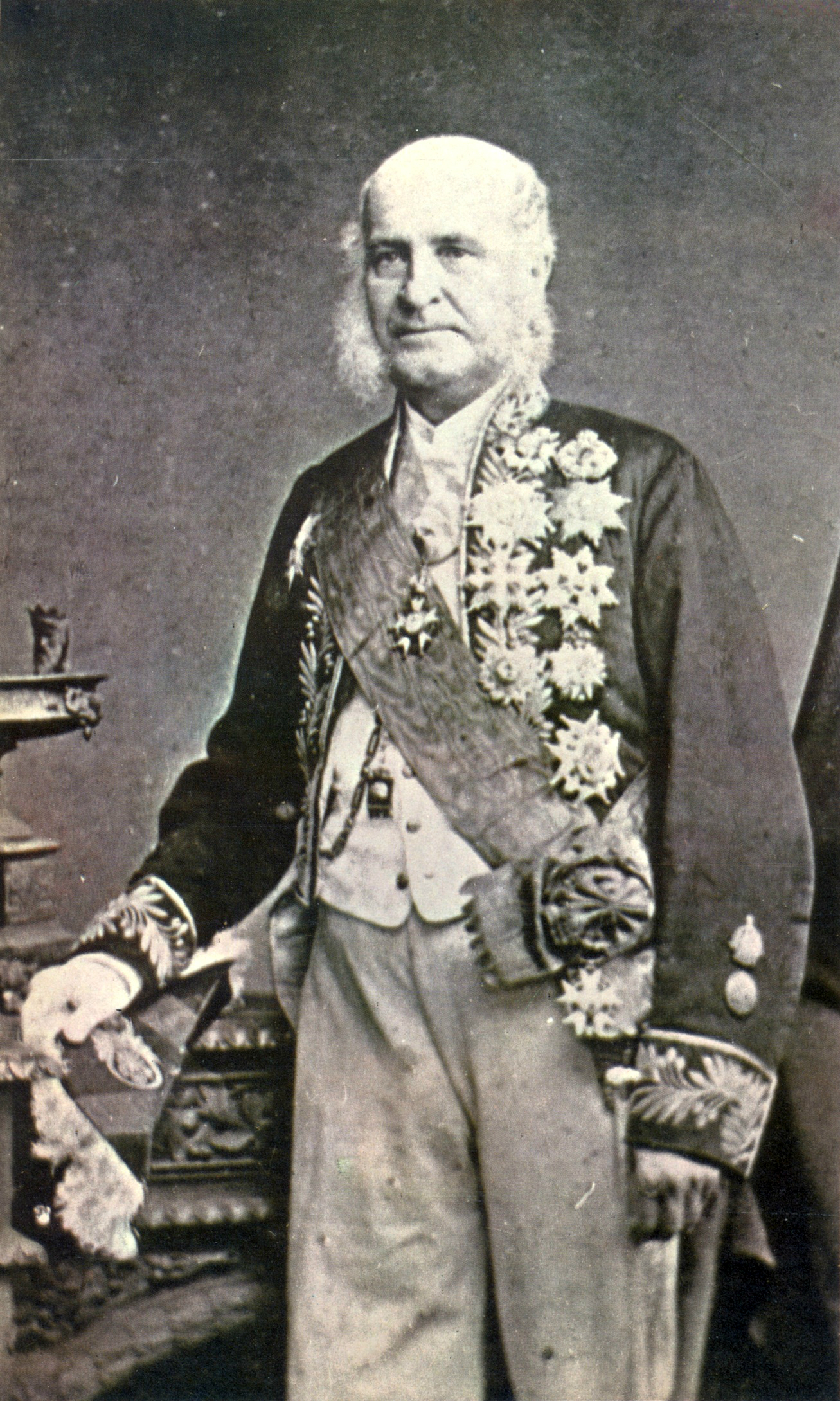
Last photograph of José Paranhos, Viscount of Rio Branco, 1880

The Rio Branco Cabinet, increasingly divided, resigned in June 1875 after having served for four years. The Cabinet's viability had been impaired by the ongoing crisis with the Catholic Church and an international financial crash that caused the failure of several Brazilian banks. The Emperor attempted, without success, to convince Paranhos to continue as head of the government. Paranhos replied in a letter: "Your Majesty knows that I wish to deliver my post to whoever is better to occupy it. If I have not become sick in public thus far, there is no doubt that I am tired." Pedro II had no intention on naming the 2nd Viscount of Uruguai as Rio Branco's replacement, to prevent the ultraconservative faction from coming to power. Instead, he called on the Duke of Caxias to head a new cabinet.

The Caxias Cabinet lasted for almost three years, until the Liberals took the reins in January 1878. With the Conservative Party now the opposition, Rio Branco decided to undertake a one-year tour of Europe, during which he visited most of its countries. He met Queen Victoria of the United Kingdom, King Umberto I of Italy, Pope Leo XIII and other leaders during this trip. Rio Branco also visited his eldest son, who was then living in Liverpool as a consul representing Brazil. He did not meet his son's children, though it is not known whether he refused to meet them or whether his son did not present them. Upon his return to Brazil, Rio Branco was met with huge celebrations in each Brazilian port he visited: in Recife, in his native Salvador, and finally in Rio de Janeiro where he arrived on 30 July 1879.

However, Brazil's champion in the fight for the abolition of slavery was dying. While in Europe, the first symptoms of mouth cancer appeared. Rio Branco was a heavy smoker, and he would daily smoke up to thirty Cuban cigars specially imported for him from Havana. Until July 1880, he was still making appearances in Parliament to deliver speeches, but after that date he no longer attended. Rio Branco still kept a close watch on political developments, however, and continued to appear at meetings of the Council of State. He had already retired from teaching in 1877.

Until 30 October, he was still capable of speaking unhindered. His doctors performed several surgeries to no avail, and the cancer spread to his throat. One night, he suffered an agonizing attack of meningitis. In a fever-induced delirium, Rio Branco said: "Do not disturb Slavery's march [toward its doom]." His last warning went unheeded, for rather than simply allowing slavery to slowly die out, the last remnants of slavery would be aggressively extinguished in 1888 by Princess Isabel and his former minister João Alfredo (by then President of the Council). At 7:05 am on 1 November 1880, Rio Branco died. His last words were: "I will confirm before God everything I have affirmed to men."

== Legacy ==
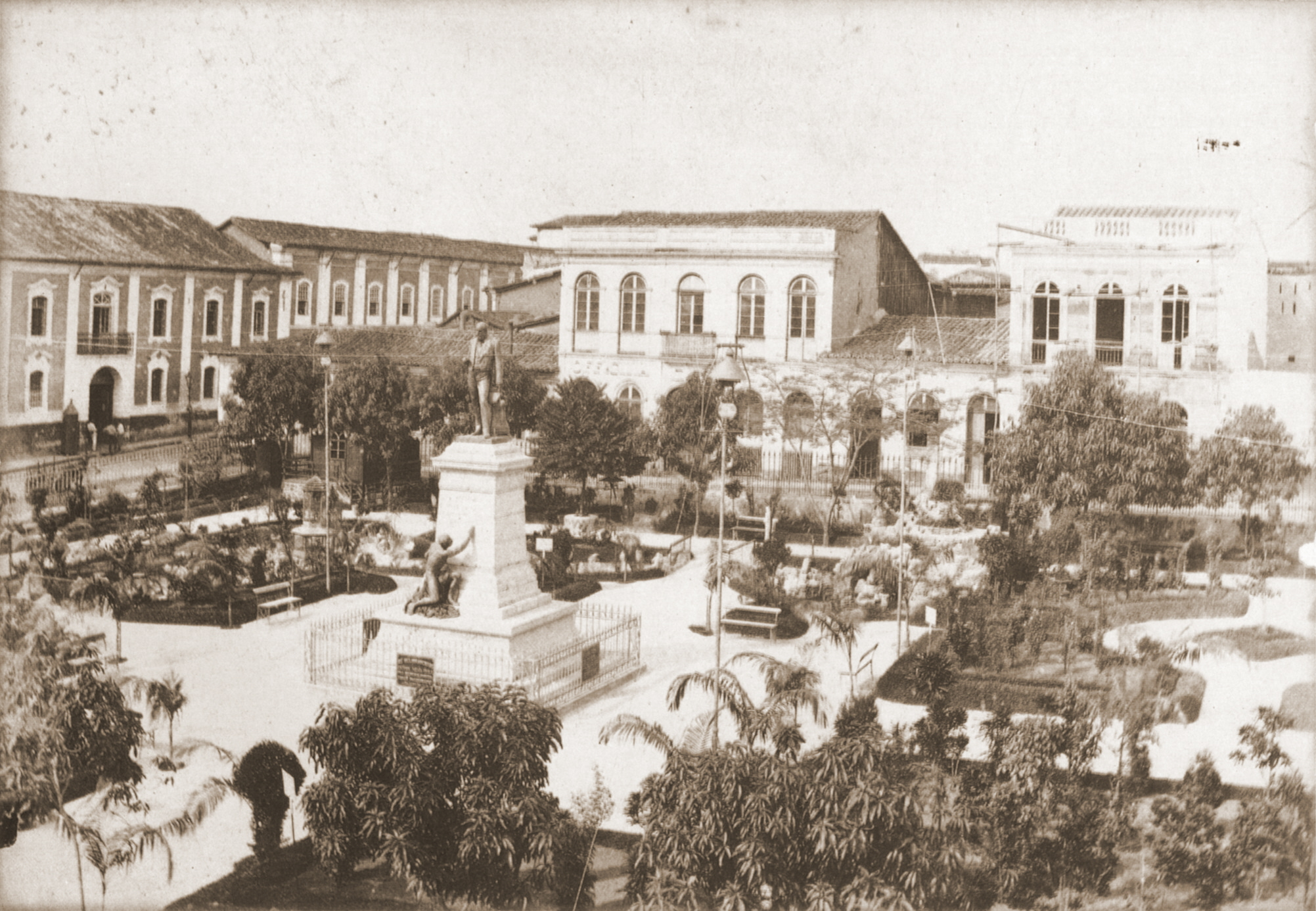
Visconde do Rio Branco Square, c. 1880. This square is located in Belém, capital of the Brazilian state of Pará. A monument in honor of Paranhos can be seen at the middle.

Rio Branco's death was met with consternation throughout the nation. Pedro II considered it, in his words, a "great loss to Brazil". The day after his death, more than 20,000 gathered in the streets of Rio de Janeiro to witness the grandiose funeral procession. He was honored with eulogies and gun salutes.

The abrupt abolition of slavery which Rio Branco had warned against eventually occurred eight years later. This resulted in the alienation of the second Viscount of Uruguai's ultraconservative faction and powerful political interests. These formed a subversive alliance with republicans and discontented military officers which led to the overthrow of the Empire on 15 November 1889.

Writing at the end of the 19th century, the Brazilian abolitionist leader Joaquim Nabuco said that Rio Branco was—of all the politicians who held the office during Pedro II's reign—the most fitted to the post of President of the Council of Ministers. Nabuco considered him one of the greatest statesmen of the Empire. However, he also argued that as a leader, a lawmaker, and a creator of doctrines, there were many other politicians far better than Rio Branco. But unlike all the others, who were brilliantly accomplished in one or a few skills, but lacking in many others, Rio Branco was good—though unexceptional—in all. In other words, he was a competent generalist. Nabuco's view was that due to Rio Branco's lack of first-rate abilities, he would not have been the best leader in troubled times—such as the anarchy which existed during Pedro II's minority, or at the end of a period of chaos when strong action was needed to rebuild. Rio Branco was, however, the perfect choice in a time of peace and stability where his multiple skills could shine. His ability exactly fit the situation in Brazil when he became President of the Council of Ministers in 1871.

According to historian Heitor Lyra, Rio Branco was the greatest politician of his time, with the only other at his level being the Marquis of Paraná. Historian José Murilo de Carvalho said that he was "without a doubt the most complete statesman of that time". Ronaldo Vainfas wrote that Rio Branco was "the typical modernizing conservative, who implemented reforms preached by the liberals, thus emptying the political platform of the opposition."

Historian Lidia Besouchet believed that he was "one of the [monarchy's] main supports" and with his death—along with the deaths of other veteran politicians—the Empire began to collapse (a view shared by other historians). Historian Hélio Vianna considered him "one of the most notable statesmen of the Empire". Historian Roderick J. Barman had a far less laudatory view toward him, saying that although he had "success as a minister and a diplomat", and as prime minister and during Pedro II's absence, Rio Branco "had more than proved his capacities" in that he "did not possess, as had [the Marquis of] Paraná, the character and political standing to act independently of the Emperor. He was very much Pedro II's agent."

== Titles and honors ==
Arms of the Viscount of Rio Branco. Its motto was "Deus et Labor".

=== Titles of nobility ===
- Viscount of Rio Branco on 20 June 1870.

=== Other titles ===
- Member of the Brazilian Council of State.
- Member of the Brazilian Historic and Geographic Institute.
- Honorary member of the British Anti-Slavery Society.

=== Honors ===
- Dignitary of the Brazilian Order of the Southern Cross.
- Commander of the Brazilian Order of the Rose.
- Grand Cross of the Portuguese Order of Christ.
- Grand Cross of the Portuguese Order of the Immaculate Conception of Vila Viçosa.
- Grand Cross of the French Légion d'honneur.
- Grand Cross of the Russian Order of the White Eagle.
- Grand Cross (1st class) of the Russian Order of St. Anna.
- Grand Cross (1st class) of the Austrian Order of Leopold.
- Grand Cross of the Italian Order of Saints Maurice and Lazarus.
- Grand Cross of the Spanish Order of Charles III.

== Footnotes ==
Political offices
| Preceded by Pedro de Alcântara Bellegarde | Minister of Navy; 15 December 1853 – 14 June 1855 | Succeeded by João Maurício Wanderley, Baron of Cotejipe |
| Preceded by Antônio Paulino Limpo de Abreu, Viscount of Abaeté | Minister of Foreign Affairs; 14 June 1855 – 4 May 1857 | Succeeded by Caetano Maria Lopes Gama, Viscount of Maranguape |
| Preceded by João Maurício Wanderley, Baron of Cotejipe | Minister of Navy; 8 October 1856 – 4 May 1857 | Succeeded by José Antônio Saraiva |
| Preceded by Caetano Maria Lopes Gama, Viscount of Maranguape | Minister of Foreign Affairs; 12 December 1858 – 10 August 1859 | Succeeded by João Lins Vieira Cansanção de Sinimbu, Viscount of Sinimbu |
| Preceded by José Antônio Saraiva | Minister of War (interim); 12 December 1858 – 12 February 1859 | Succeeded by Manuel Felizardo de Sousa e Melo |
| Preceded by João Lins Vieira Cansanção de Sinimbu, Viscount of Sinimbu | Minister of Foreign Affairs (interim); 2 March 1861 – 21 April 1861 | Succeeded by Antônio Coelho de Sá e Albuquerque |
| Preceded by Ângelo Moniz da Silva Ferraz, Baron of Uruguaiana | Minister of Finance; 2 March 1861 – 24 May 1862 | Succeeded by José Pedro Dias de Carvalho |
| Preceded by João Silveira de Sousa | Minister of Foreign Affairs; 16 July 1868 – 29 September 1870 | Succeeded by José Antônio Pimenta Bueno, Marquis of São Vicente |
| Preceded by José Antônio Pimenta Bueno, Marquis of São Vicente | President of the Council of Ministers; 7 March 1871 – 25 June 1875 | Succeeded by Luís Alves de Lima e Silva, Duke of Caxias |
| Preceded by Francisco de Sales Torres Homem, Viscount of Inhomirim | Minister of Finance; 7 March 1871 – 25 June 1875 | Succeeded by João Maurício Wanderley, Baron of Cotejipe |
