= Rose su rose =

Single by Mina

from the album Catene
- Language: Italian
- B-side: "Ninna nanna"
- Released: February 1984
- Recorded: 1984
- Studio: Studi PDU, Lugano
- Genre: Pop rock
- Length: 3:56
- Label: PDU
- Songwriters: Massimiliano Pani; Piero Cassano

Mina singles chronology
| "Devi dirmi di sì" (1983) | "Rose su rose" (1984) | "Comincia tu" (1984) |

"Rose su rose" (English: "Roses on roses") is a song by Italian singer Mina. It was written by Massimiliano Pani, Mina's son, Piero Cassano, and arranged by Celso Valli. The song was released as a single in February 1984 and reached number 16 on the Italian chart, staying there for seven weeks. In the same year, it was included in the studio album Catene. "Ninna nanna", used as the b-side, remained unreleased until the publication of Mina Studio Collection in 1998.

"Rose su rose" was also chosen as the theme song for 34th Italian Song Festival. Gianni Ravera, the artistic director, told about this at a press conference dedicated to the organization of the festival in early 1984. This choice was sharply criticized by the press of that time, since Mina had been absent from the stage for six years, and more than twenty years ago she swore that she no longer wanted to have anything to do with Sanremo.

== Track listing ==
7" single
A. "Rose su rose" – 3:56
B. "Ninna nanna" (Massimiliano Pani, Valentino Alfano) – 2:15

== Personnel ==
- Mina – vocals
- Celso Valli – arrangement
- Gigi Cappellotto – bass guitar
- Flaviano Cuffari – drums
- Paolo Gianolio – guitar
- Aldo Banfi – synthesizer
- Nuccio Rinaldis – recording

Credits are adapted from the album's liner notes.

== Charts ==
Chart performance for "Rose su rose"
| Chart (1984) | Peak position |
|---|---|
| Italy (Musica e dischi) | 16 |
