= Devi dirmi di sì =

Single by Mina

from the album Mina 25
- Language: Italian
- B-side: "La controsamba"
- Released: November 1983
- Recorded: 26 July–26 August 1983
- Studio: Studi PDU, Lugano
- Genre: Pop
- Length: 4:15
- Label: PDU
- Composers: Massimiliano Pani; Piero Cassano
- Lyricists: Pani; Valentino Alfano

Mina singles chronology
"Morirò per te" (1982)	"Devi dirmi di sì" (1983)	"Rose su rose" (1984)

"Devi dirmi di sì" (English: "You have to say yes to me") is a song by Italian singer Mina, recorded for her 1983 studio album Mina 25. It was written by Massimiliano Pani, Piero Cassano, Valentino Alfano, and arranged by Pani. The song was used as the opening theme for Enzo Dell'Aquila's program Trent'anni della nostra storia, dedicated to the history of RAI broadcasting company. Also released as a single along with "La controsamba", the song reached number seven on the Italian chart, stayed there for 16 weeks.

== Track listing ==
7" single
A. "Devi dirmi di sì" – 4:15
B. "La controsamba" (Giorgio Calabrese, Celso Valli) – 5:04

== Charts ==
Chart performance for "Devi dirmi di sì"
Chart (1983)	Peak position
Italy (Billboard)	12
Italy (Musica e dischi)	7
