= Pra Frente Brasil (song) =

Single
- Released: 1970
- Genre: Samba; jingle
- Composer: Miguel Gustavo
- Lyricist: Miguel Gustavo (Portuguese lyrics)

Pra Frente Brasil is a song composed by Miguel Gustavo to inspire the Brazilian team in the 1970 FIFA World Cup. It was sung by the country and became the anthem of this edition, for Brazilians.

It was created for a contest organized by the sponsors of the transmissions of the World Cup matches.

According to the composer and trombonist Raul de Souza, in an interview with Jornal do Brasil in 2002, the melody is his own, with Miguel Gustavo only writing the lyrics.

== Bibliography ==
- Ricardo Cravo Albin (2003). O livro de ouro da MPB: a história de nossa música popular de sua origem até hoje. [S.l.]: Ediouro. ISBN 9788500013454
- Nara Damante (2007). Grandes nomes da mídia brasileira. [S.l.]: Nobel. ISBN 9788521313250
- Ana Maria Bahiana (2006). Almanaque anos 70. [S.l.: s.n.] ISBN 9788500017889
