= Mina 25 =

Studio album by Mina
- Released: October 1983
- Recorded: 1983
- Studio: Studi PDU, Lugano
- Genre: Europop; jazz
- Length: 77:00
- Language: Italian; English; Neapolitan; Spanish
- Label: PDU

Mina chronology
Del mio meglio n. 7 (1983)	Mina 25 (1983)	Catene (1984)

Singles from Mina 25
- 1. "Devi dirmi di sì" Released: November 1983

Mina 25 (or simply 25) is double studio album by Italian singer Mina, released in October 1983 by PDU and distributed by EMI Italiana.

== Overview ==
The celebration of the anniversary of Mina's career coincided with the thirtieth anniversary of the RAI broadcasting company, which offered the singer a collaboration. Mina's songs from this album, as well as her comments, were used as the soundtrack to Paolo Frajese's Trent'anni della nostra storia (Thirty Years of Our History). The first issue of the program covered the history of the channel from 1945 to 1955, so the singer recorded songs from this period. This was the first such work, and three more albums will be released in the following years: Catene (1984), Finalmente ho conosciuto il conte Dracula... (1985) and Sì, buana (1986).

The song Verde luna had already been included on the album Salomè and was re-recorded for this album.

To support the album, the single "Devi dirmi di sì" was released with the song "La controsamba" on the b-side. The song was a success with listeners and reached the 7th place in the singles chart. The album itself debuted at the twenty-second position on the weekly albums chart, and in the fourth week of its stay reached the peak eighth position. In total, the album spent a total of 14 weeks there.

== Critical reception ==
Christian Calabrese from Musica e dischi gave a positive assessment of the album, calling the songs very beautiful, mostly because of the authors with whom Mina has been collaborating for a long time and who know her style.

== Track listing ==
=== Volume 1 ===
Side A
No.	Title	Writer(s)	Length
1.	"Only You"	Buck Ram; Ande Rand	3:15
2.	"Nature Boy"	Eden Ahbez	3:34
3.	"Che bambola!"	Leo Chiosso; Fred Buscaglione	2:44
4.	"Sophisticated Lady"	Duke Ellington	3:50
5.	"Ho un sassolino nella scarpa"	Marcello Valci	2:58
6.	"Chattanooga Choo-Choo"	Harry Warren; Mack Gordon	3:10
Total length:			19:31

Side B
No.	Title	Writer(s)	Length
1.	"A chi (Hurt)"	Mogol; Jimmie Crane; Art Jacobs	3:02
2.	"Che m'è 'mparato a fà"	Dino Verde; Armando Trovajoli	3:38
3.	"Amore baciami"	Giancarlo Testoni; Carlo Alberto Rossi	4:09
4.	"Misty"	Erroll Garner; Johnny Burke	4:16
5.	"Bellezze in bicicletta"	Giovanni D'Anzi; Marcello Marchesi	2:30
6.	"Verde luna"	Vicente Gomez	2:35
Total length:			20:10

=== Volume 2 ===
Side C
No.	Title	Writer(s)	Length
1.	"Devi dirmi di sì"	Massimiliano Pani; Valentino Alfano; Piero Cassano	4:16
2.	"Allora sì"	Franco Califano; Massimo Guantini	4:14
3.	"Non ho difese"	Giorgio Calabrese; Celso Valli	4:08
4.	"Cowboys"	Ivano Fossati	1:51
5.	"Magia"	Andrea Lo Vecchio; Gino Mescoli	4:20
Total length:			18:49

Side D
No.	Title	Writer(s)	Length
1.	"La controsamba"	Calabrese; Valli	5:08
2.	"Giuro di dirti la verità"	Cristiano Malgioglio; Corrado Castellari	4:27
3.	"Un'aquila nel cuore"	Anselmo Genovese	3:35
4.	"Ahi, mi' amor (Romance de curro "El Palmo")"	Paolo Limiti; Joan Manuel Serrat	6:15
Total length:			19:25

== Personnel ==
- Mina – vocals
- Victor Bach – arrangement (A1–B6), strings, wind instruments, keyboard
- Massimiliano Pani – arrangement (C1), background vocals
- Celso Valli – arrangement (C2, C3, C5–D3), keyboard
- Mario Robbiani – arrangement (C4, D4), strings, keyboard
- Piero Cassano – background vocals
- Lella Esposito – background vocals
- Giulia Fasolino – background vocals
- Gianni Ferrio – background vocals
- Naimy Hackett – background vocals
- Germano Melotti – background vocals
- Silvio Pozzoli – background vocals
- Wanda Radicchi – background vocals
- Gigi Cappellotto – bass
- Paolo Gianolio – bass
- Massimo Moriconi – bass
- Hugo Heredia – clarinet
- Paolo Tomelleri – clarinet
- Ellade Bandini – drums, percussion
- Bruno Bergonzi – drums
- Rolando Ceragioli – drums
- Flaviano Cuffari – drums
- Walter Scebran – drums, percussion
- Sergio Farina – guitar
- Angel "Pato" Garcia – guitar
- Paolo Gianolio – guitar
- Ernesto Massimo Verardi – guitar
- Bruno De Filippi – harmonica
- Simonne Sporck – harp
- Maurizio Preti – percussion
- Aldo Banfi – synthesizer

== Charts ==
Chart performance for Mina 25
Chart (1983–1984)	Peak position
Italian Albums (Billboard)	16
Italian Albums (Musica e dischi)	8
