= Aureliano Coutinho, Viscount of Sepetiba =

Brazilian politician

The Viscount of Sepetiba
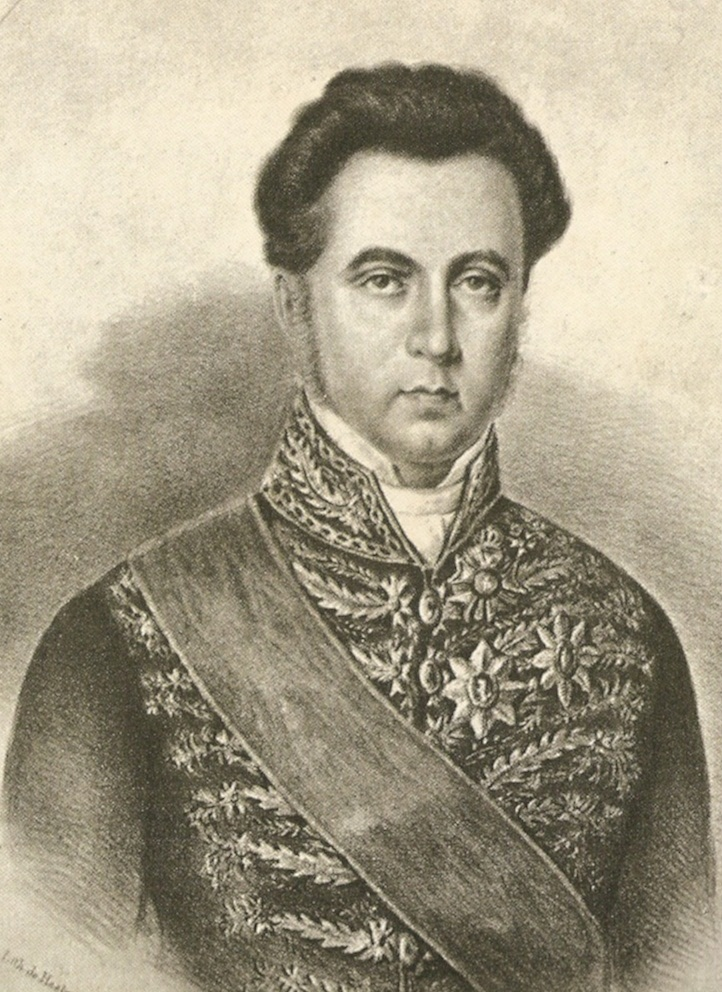
- Aureliano de Sousa e Oliveira Coutinho, Viscount of Sepetiba

Minister of Justice
- In office 4 June 1833 – 16 January 1835
- Monarch: Pedro II
- Preceded by: Cândido José de Araújo Viana
- Succeeded by: Manuel Alves Branco

Personal details
- Born: 21 July 1800 Niterói, Rio de Janeiro, Colonial Brazil
- Died: 25 September 1855 (aged 55) Niterói, Rio de Janeiro, Empire of Brazil
- Party: 1st Liberal Party (1830–1831); Moderate Party (1831–1837); 2nd Liberal Party (Courtier Faction) (1837 – c. 1847); 2nd Liberal Party (c. 1847 – 1855)
- Occupation: Politician
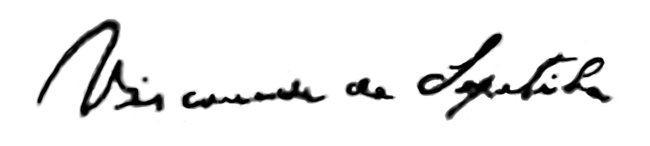
- Signature

Aureliano de Sousa e Oliveira Coutinho, Viscount of Sepetiba (21 July 1800 – 25 September 1855) was a Brazilian politician, judge and monarchist during the period of the Empire of Brazil (1822–1889). He was the leader of the "Courtier Faction", a political faction composed of high-ranking palace servants and notable politicians who exercised a strong influence over Emperor Pedro II in his early years.
