= Miguel Gustavo =

Brazilian journalist and songwriter

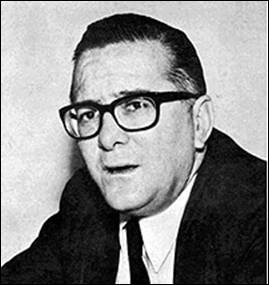
- Born: Miguel Gustavo Werneck de Sousa Martins; 24 March 1922; Rio de Janeiro
- Died: 22 January 1972 (aged 49); Rio de Janeiro
- Occupations: Journalist, songwriter
- Spouse: Sagramor de Scuvero Brandão
- Children: Ana Maria, Maria Lúcia

Miguel Gustavo (24 March 1922 – 22 January 1972) was a Brazilian journalist, and songwriter. He made important contributions the Brazilian journalism, literature, and music.

== Biography ==
Born in Rio de Janeiro in 1922, he started as a disc jockey for Radio Vera Cruz in 1941 and stood out as a jingle composer, in addition to having also made hits as a composer of sambas and marches.

Later came the cycle of sambas de breque with Moreira da Silva. He continued in 1950 composing jingles, including Casas da Banha, which caused controversy for using an excerpt from the melody "Jesus, the joy of men" by J. S. Bach.

In 1962 he composed, with Jorge Veiga, the piece Brigitte Bardot. For the 1970 World Cup in Mexico he composed the anthem Pra Frente Brasil and the melody became a symbol of the Selection.

In the same year, he composed the song Assaia, inspired by Miriam Batucada.

Miguel Gustavo died in 1972 and was buried in the Caju Cemetery, in the city of Rio de Janeiro.

== Popular tracks ==
- 1952: Baião das Mulheres, Miguel Gustavo and João S. Guimarães
- 1953: Baião do Chofer, Miguel Gustavo
- 1956: A Dança Do Didu, Miguel Gustavo
- 1956: Boate Tra La Lá, Miguel Gustavo
- 1957: A Dança do Bidú, Miguel Gustavo
- 1957: A Fúria Louca de Jean Pouchard, Miguel Gustavo
- 1957: A Menina Canta, Miguel Gustavo
- 1957: Bem Vindo Seja, Miguel Gustavo
- 1958: Brabuletas de Brasília, Miguel Gustavo, Altamiro Carrilho and Carrapicho
- 1959: Baião Triste, Altamiro Carrilho and Miguel Gustavo
- 1962: Bacardy Chá-chá-chá, Miguel Gustavo
- 1970: Bloco Da Lua, Luiz Reis and Miguel Gustavo
- 1970: Brasil Eu Adoro Você, Miguel Gustavo
