= Brigitte Bardot (song) =

- 7" vinyl Italian single cover

Single by Jorge Veiga
- Written: 1962
- Genre: Samba
- Label: GEMA
- Songwriter: Miguel Gustavo

"Brigitte Bardot" is a samba song composed in 1962 by Brazilian composer and journalist Miguel Gustavo (real name Miguel Gustavo Werneck de Sousa Martins).

== History ==
The song is a popular march and was inspired by the French actress Brigitte Bardot. In 1978 it was brought to the fore by the Belgian trio Two Man Sound in the famous Disco Samba medley.

== Lyrics ==
Original Brigitte Bardot Bardot,
Brigitte beijou beijou,
Lá dentro do cinema todo mundo se afobou.

Free translation Brigitte Bardot Bardot,
Brigitte she kissed she kissed,
Inside the cinema, everyone was frantic.

== Others versions ==
1961 - Roberto Seto (presented live in French TV on October 2, 1961. Which means that the song was not composed in 1962)

- 1978 — Two Man Sound
