= Sanremo Music Festival 1969 =

Italian song contest (19th edition)

Dates and venue
- First night: 30 January 1969
- Second night: 31 January 1969
- Final night: 1 February 1969
- Venue: Sanremo Casino; Sanremo, Italy

Organisation
- Organiser: Società ATA

Production
- Broadcaster: Radiotelevisione italiana (RAI)
- Director: Lino Procacci
- Artistic director: Vincenzo Micocci
- Presenters: Nuccio Costa and Gabriella Farinon

Vote
- Number of entries: 24
- Winner: "Zingara"; Bobby Solo and Iva Zanicchi

The Sanremo Music Festival 1969 (Italian: Festival di Sanremo 1969), officially the 19th Italian Song Festival (19º Festival della canzone italiana), was the 19th annual Sanremo Music Festival, held at the Sanremo Casino in Sanremo, Italy, between 30 January and 1 February 1969. It was organised by Società ATA, concessionary of the Sanremo Casino and was broadcast by Radiotelevisione italiana (RAI). The shows were presented by Nuccio Costa and Gabriella Farinon.

Each song was performed twice by both Italian and foreign artists. The winning song was "Zingara" written by Luigi Albertelli and Enrico Riccardi, performed by both Bobby Solo and Iva Zanicchi. Zanicchi was then selected from the two artists to represent Italy at the Eurovision Song Contest 1969, and went on to compete with the song "Due grosse lacrime bianche".

In January 2019, to celebrate the edition's 50th anniversary, RAI made all three shows available to view on the Rai Teche website and their streaming service RaiPlay.

== Format ==
The festival was organised by Società ATA, the concessionary of the Sanremo Casino. In March 1968, the Sanremo municipal council approved the transfer of sixty percent of ATA's shares to their former president Ezio Radaelli, reinstating him as president of the company. The council later granted ATA a five-year extension of the casino's management, also allowing them to continue organising the festival as they had done since the 1958 edition. ATA initially announced that Gianni Ravera would continue to serve as the festival's artistic director, but he declined the offer due to disagreements with Radaelli over ideas regarding the event's organisation. Radaelli then appointed Vincenzo Micocci as the artistic director.

In July, ATA held a press conference announcing a list of regulations for the festival's 1969 edition. They confirmed the event would be held across three nights between 30 January and 1 February 1969 and consist of twenty-four songs, with no major changes made to the voting system.

In September, the Italian Ministry of the Interior denied ratifying the Sanremo municipal council's decision to grant ATA a five-year extension on the concession of the Sanremo Casino. The ministry permitted the municipality to give the company a temporary extension on its concession past the 9 October expiry date, in order to prevent interference with the festival's organisation. An auction for the casino's management was scheduled for February 1969 after the festival's conclusion, but was later suspended.

=== Voting system ===
The vote in each show was conducted by twenty-one juries formed by newspapers across Italy, each with twenty-five members stationed in their respective newspaper offices. Juries were required to be diverse, split equally between men and women and with a majority of members under the age of 25. During the first two nights, jury members gave one vote to seven different songs, while in the final they gave one vote to three songs.

== Competing entries ==
ATA received 247 song submissions for the competition. A seven member selection committee tasked with narrowing down the list of submissions to twenty-four was chosen by publishing and record companies from a list of twenty-one candidates proposed by ATA's president, Ezio Radaelli. The committee included the journalists Adriano Bolzoni, Filippo D'Errico, Daniele Ionio, Mario Olivieri, Gigi Speroni, Marcello Zeri and the composer Carlo Rustichelli. The twenty-four selected songs were announced on 30 December.

The artists union Unione cantanti italiana (UCI) requested the number of foreign artists participating in the competition not exceed ten, which ATA agreed upon during a meeting with the union on 10 January.

Michele was initially announced among the list of competing artists, set to perform the song "Tu sei bella come sei", but voluntarily withdrew and was replaced by The Showmen. Anna Identici was also announced as a competing artist, with the song "Il treno", but was unable to attend the event after attempting suicide and being admitted to a hospital's intensive care unit. Rosanna Fratello was later announced as her replacement.

Competing entries
Song	Artist 1	Artist 2	Songwriter(s)	Conductor(s)
"Alla fine della strada"	Junior Magli	The Casuals	Lorenzo Pilat; Daniele Pace; Mario Panzeri	Guido Lamorgese
"Baci baci baci"	Wilma Goich	The Sweet Inspirations	Franco Bracardi; Sergio Bardotti	Natale Massara; Ezio Leoni
"Bada bambina"	Little Tony	Mario Zelinotti	Bruno Zambrini; Franco Migliacci	Willy Brezza; Mario Capuano
"Cosa hai messo nel caffè?"	Riccardo Del Turco	Antoine	Riccardo Del Turco; Giancarlo Bigazzi	Gianfranco Monaldi; Guido Lamorgese
"Il gioco dell'amore"	Caterina Caselli	Johnny Dorelli	Ivo Callegari; Franco Migliacci	Gianfranco Monaldi; Detto Mariano
"Il sole è tramontato"	Checco	Elio Gandolfi	Rosa Nisi Marsella; Giuseppe Moschini; Riccardo Pradella	Iller Pattacini; Mario Magenta
"Il treno"	Rosanna Fratello	Brenton Wood	Elio Isola; Vito Pallavicini	Massimo Salerno; Hal Winn
"Io che ho te"	New Trolls	Leonardo	Vittorio De Scalzi; Nico Di Palo; Giorgio D'Adamo	Massimo Salerno
"La pioggia"	Gigliola Cinquetti	France Gall	Mario Panzeri; Corrado Conti; Daniele Pace; Gianni Argenio	Gianfranco Monaldi; Renato Angiolini
"Le belle donne"	Robertino	Rocky Roberts	Michele Virano; Vito Pallavicini; Giorgio Conte	Mario Magenta; Willy Brezza
"Lontano dagli occhi"	Sergio Endrigo	Mary Hopkin	Sergio Endrigo	Giancarlo Chiaramello; Gian Piero Reverberi
"Ma che freddo fa"	Nada	The Rokes	Claudio Mattone; Franco Migliacci	Ruggero Cini; Piero Pintucci
"Meglio una sera (piangere da solo)"	Mino Reitano	Claudio Villa	Franco Reitano; Mino Reitano; Nisa; Alberto Salerno	Massimo Salerno; Giancarlo Chiaramello
"Non c'è che lei"	Sonia	Armando Savini	Carlo Alberto Rossi; Marisa Terzi	Gian Piero Reverberi; Piero Soffici
"Piccola piccola"	Carmen Villani	Alessandra Casaccia	Giorgio Bertero; Marino Marini; Aldo Valleroni; Vincenzo Buonassisi	Giancarlo Chiaramello; Massimo Salerno
"Quando l'amore diventa poesia"	Orietta Berti	Massimo Ranieri	Piero Soffici; Mogol	Piero Soffici; Gianfranco Monaldi
"Se tu ragazzo mio"	Gabriella Ferri	Stevie Wonder	Gabriella Ferri; Piero Pintucci; Vittorio Ferri	Piero Pintucci; Gene Kee
"Tu sei bella come sei"	The Showmen	Mal and the Primitives	Marcello Marrocchi; Giuseppe Cassia; Sergio Bardotti	Vito Tommaso; Piero Pintucci
"Un sorriso"	Don Backy	Milva	Don Backy; Detto Mariano	Detto Mariano
"Un'avventura"	Lucio Battisti	Wilson Pickett	Lucio Battisti; Mogol	Gian Piero Reverberi
"Un'ora fa"	Fausto Leali	Tony Del Monaco	Gianfranco Intra; Luciano Beretta; Ermanno Parazzini	Gianfranco Intra; Natale Massara
"Una famiglia"	Memo Remigi	Isabella Iannetti	Memo Remigi; Alberto Testa	Angelo Giacomazzi; Franco Cassano
"Zingara"	Bobby Solo	Iva Zanicchi	Enrico Riccardi; Luigi Albertelli	Detto Mariano; Ezio Leoni
"Zucchero"	Rita Pavone	Dik Dik	Roberto Soffici; Roberto Guscelli; Mogol; Ascri	John Fiddy; Natale Massara

== Shows ==
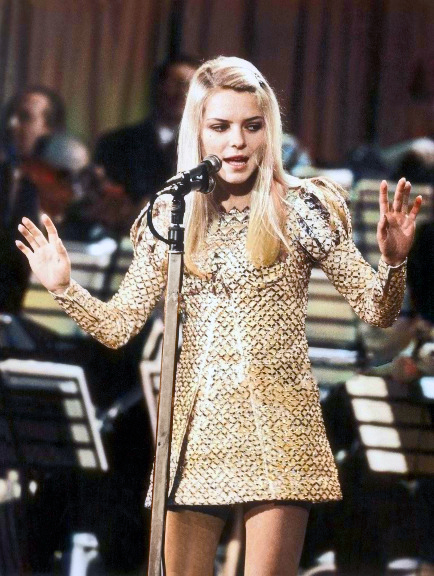
French singer France Gall performing at the festival

The festival consisted of three live shows held between 30 January and 1 February 1969. The first two nights consisted of twelve songs performed twice, in which seven qualified from each show, creating a final of fourteen songs performed twice. A 32-piece orchestra were able to accompany each performance. All shows were presented by Nuccio Costa and Gabriella Farinon. The television director was Lino Procacci.

For the first two nights, songs were presented in groups of three in an order decided by random draw. The draw also decided the order artists would perform in, with the exception of foreign artists, who always performed their song after an Italian artist had already done so. For the final, the show was split into two halves, with each half containing every song performed once in an order determined by random draw. Foreign artists performed exclusively in the second half of the show, with the decision of which half Italian artists would perform in made by the respective record label of each artist.

For the first time, a theme song was used for the event: "La canzone portafortuna" written by Tony Renis, Albero Testa, Orfelius and Medi Mandour, which was initially to be performed in two versions by Renis and Lara Saint Paul at the start and end of each show. However, after complaints from competing artists and a formal protest from UCI, the planned performances were scrapped, and both versions of the song instead served as background music to a short video played at the start of each show.

=== First night ===
The first night took place on 30 January 1969 at 21:15 CET. Twelve songs were performed and seven were selected for the final.

Qualifier

First night – 30 January 1969
R/O	Song	Artist 1	Artist 2	Points	Place
1	"Un'avventura"	Lucio Battisti	Wilson Pickett	323	4
2	"Cosa hai messo nel caffè?"	Riccardo Del Turco	Antoine	307	6
3	"Tu sei bella come sei"	The Showmen	Mal and the Primitives	302	7
4	"Meglio una sera (piangere da solo)"	Mino Reitano	Claudio Villa	—N/a	
5	"Zucchero"	Dik Dik	Rita Pavone	401	2
6	"Il sole è tramontato"	Checco	Elio Gandolfi	—N/a	
7	"Un sorriso"	Don Backy	Milva	413	1
8	"Ma che freddo fa"	Nada	The Rokes	323	4
9	"Alla fine della strada"	Junior Magli	The Casuals	—N/a	
10	"Io che ho te"	New Trolls	Leonardo	—N/a	
11	"Le belle donne"	Robertino	Rocky Roberts	—N/a	
12	"La pioggia"	Gigliola Cinquetti	France Gall	391	3

=== Second night ===
The second night took place on 31 January 1969 at 21:15 CET. Twelve songs were performed and seven were selected for the final.

Qualifier

Second night – 31 January 1969
R/O	Song	Artist 1	Artist 2	Points	Place
1	"Baci baci baci"	Wilma Goich	The Sweet Inspirations	—N/a	
2	"Una famiglia"	Memo Remigi	Isabella Iannetti	—N/a	
3	"Se tu ragazzo mio"	Gabriella Ferri	Stevie Wonder (Note: Performed under the title "Se tu ragazza mia")	—N/a	
4	"Un'ora fa"	Fausto Leali	Tony Del Monaco	411	4
5	"Non c'è che lei"	Sonia (Note: Performed under the title "Non c'è che lui")	Armando Savini	—N/a	
6	"Zingara"	Bobby Solo	Iva Zanicchi	448	1
7	"Piccola piccola"	Carmen Villani	Alessandra Casaccia	311	6
8	"Il treno"	Rosanna Fratello	Brenton Wood	—N/a	
9	"Lontano dagli occhi"	Sergio Endrigo	Mary Hopkin	442	2
10	"Il gioco dell'amore"	Caterina Caselli	Johnny Dorelli	422	3
11	"Quando l'amore diventa poesia"	Orietta Berti	Massimo Ranieri	256	7
12	"Bada bambina"	Little Tony	Mario Zelinotti	327	5

=== Final night ===
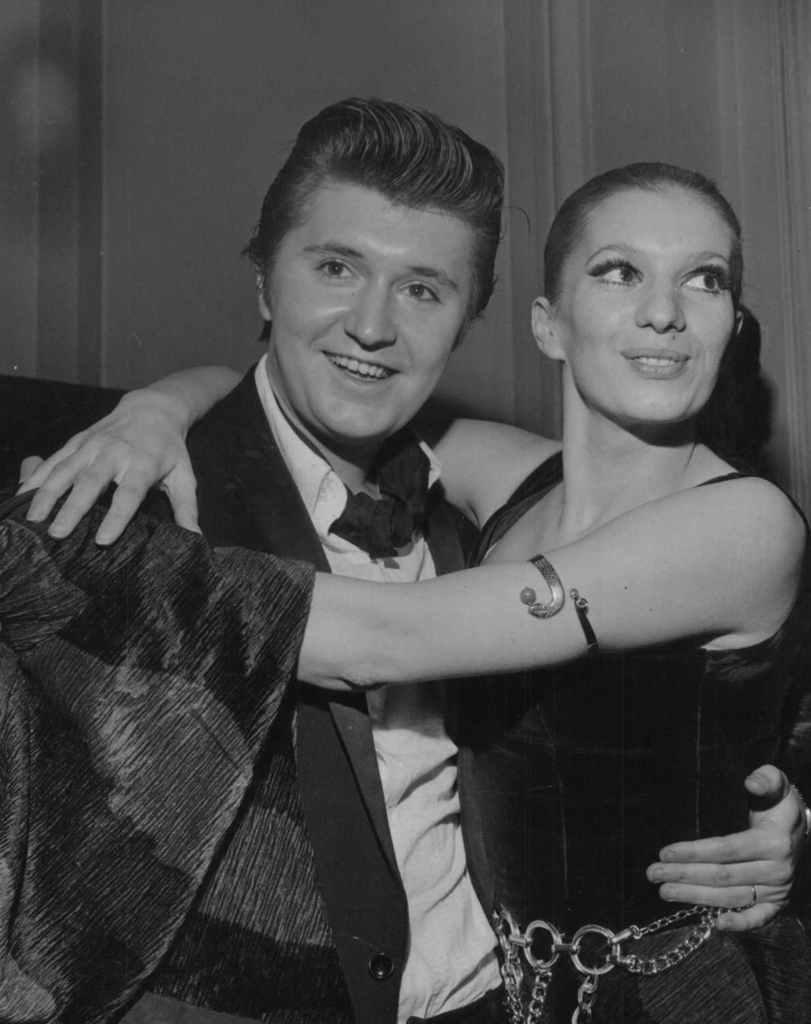
Bobby Solo and Iva Zanicchi after their victory

The final night took place on 1 February 1969 at 21:00 CET. The fourteen songs admitted to the final were performed again and a winner was chosen.

The winning song was "Zingara" written by Luigi Albertelli and Enrico Riccardi, performed by Bobby Solo and Iva Zanicchi, serving as both artists' second victory at the contest. In second place was the song "Lontano dagli occhi" written and performed by Sergio Endrigo, and additionally performed by Welsh singer Mary Hopkin, with "Un sorriso" written by Don Backy and Detto Mariano, performed by both Backy and Milva placing third. All six performances of the top three songs were repeated at the end of the show.

Winner

Final night – 1 February 1969
R/O	Song	Artist 1	Artist 2	Points	Place
1	"Bada bambina"	Little Tony	Mario Zelinotti	54	12
2	"Zingara"	Bobby Solo	Iva Zanicchi	237	1
3	"Un sorriso"	Don Backy	Milva	178	3
4	"Quando l'amore diventa poesia"	Orietta Berti	Massimo Ranieri	63	10
5	"Ma che freddo fa"	Nada	The Rokes	141	5
6	"La pioggia"	Gigliola Cinquetti	France Gall	116	6
7	"Il gioco dell'amore"	Caterina Caselli	Johnny Dorelli	86	8
8	"Zucchero"	Rita Pavone	Dik Dik	53	13
9	"Un'ora fa"	Fausto Leali	Tony Del Monaco	154	4
10	"Un'avventura"	Lucio Battisti	Wilson Pickett	69	9
11	"Cosa hai messo nel caffè?"	Riccardo Del Turco	Antoine	29	14
12	"Lontano dagli occhi"	Sergio Endrigo	Mary Hopkin	228	2
13	"Piccola piccola"	Carmen Villani	Alessandra Casaccia	59	11
14	"Tu sei bella come sei"	The Showmen	Mal and the Primitives	93	7

== Broadcasts ==
=== Local broadcast ===
The final was broadcast on Programma Nazionale (television) and Secondo Programma (radio) beginning at 21:00 CET. The first two nights were broadcast on Secondo Programma (television) and Secondo Programma (radio) at 21:15 CET. In Italy, the final was broadcast on television to an estimated 22.4 million viewers, with the first and second nights broadcast to an estimated 19.5 and 19.4 million viewers respectively.

=== International broadcast ===
The first half of the final was broadcast via the Eurovision and Intervision networks in other countries. Known details on the broadcasts in each country, including the specific broadcasting stations and commentators are shown in the tables below.

International broadcasters of the Sanremo Music Festival 1969
Country	Broadcaster	Channel(s)	Commentator(s)	Ref(s)
Brazil	Rádio Jornal do Brasil (Note: Delayed broadcast on 12 February at 9:00 (BRT))			
Hungary	MR	Kossuth Rádió		
Japan	NHK	NHK (Note: Delayed broadcast on 27 April)	Yutaka Ishida	
Portugal	RTP	RTP (Note: Delayed broadcast the following day)		
Romania	TVR	Programul 1 (Note: Delayed broadcast on 16 February 1969 in a shortened format at 23:00 (EET))		
Spain	TVE	TVE 1, TVE Canarias (Note: Deferred broadcast on TVE Canarias the following day at 22:25 (WET))	Federico Gallo	
Spain	RNE	Radio Nacional		
Spain	RNE	Radio Peninsular de Barcelona		
Spain	Cadena SER (Note: Simulcast on Radio Barcelona, Radio Castellón, Radio Murcia, Radio Orense, and Radio Sevilla.)			
Yugoslavia	JRT	Televizija Beograd		
Yugoslavia	JRT	Televizija Ljubljana		

== Incidents and controversies ==
=== Protests ===
Numerous protests of the festival were threatened in its lead-up for reasons such as the low song quality, mismanagement of the Sanremo Casino, stagnation of the city's tour operators and the high price of admission. As a precautionary measure, the afternoon rehearsals of all three shows were recorded and were to replace the live broadcasts in case the event experienced any disruptions. At the time, the city underwent an increased police and military presence.

An alternate festival organised by Dario Fo and Franca Rame with support from the Italian Communist Party, serving as a protest of the original event, took place on 30 January at Sanremo's Villa Ormond. Additionally, three university students went on a hunger strike during the week, using the festival's publicity to bring attention to underdeveloped neighbourhoods ignored by the city's government.
