= Ronnie Aldrich =

British musician (1916–1993)

- Aldrich in 1969.

Background information
- Born: 15 February 1916; Erith, Kent, England
- Died: 30 September 1993 (aged 77) Clatterbridge, Cheshire
- Occupations: Pianist; arranger; conductor; composer
- Instrument: Piano
- Labels: Decca, London, Amberjack, Seaward
- Formerly of: The London Festival Orchestra, BBC, The Ladybirds, Benny Hill, The Squadronaires

Ronald Frank Aldrich (15 February 1916 – 30 September 1993) was a British easy listening and jazz pianist, arranger, conductor and composer.

== Early life ==
He was born Ronald Frank Aldrich on 15 February 1916 in Erith, Kent, England, the only son of a store manager. He started playing the piano at three years old and was educated at the Harvey Grammar School in Folkestone and learned violin at the Guildhall School of Music and Drama. He travelled to India in the late 1930s ahead of World War Two to play jazz and first gained fame in the 1940s as the leader of a Royal Air Force band, later called The Squadronaires who had a 20-year-long career before they disbanded in 1964.

== Education and career ==
Aldrich was educated at The Harvey Grammar School, Folkestone, and taught violin at the Guildhall School of Music and Drama. Before the Second World War, he went to India to play jazz and first gained fame in the 1940s with the Squadronaires, which he led from 1951, when the band was then billed as Ronnie Aldrich and The Squadronaires, up until their disbanding in 1964.

Aldrich was noteworthy for his arrangements for stereo LPs featuring two piano parts, often mixed so that one piano part was only audible in the left channel, while the other was only audible in the right channel (the Decca Phase 4 Stereo series). Aldrich played both piano parts at separate times using overdubbing. He recorded for the Decca Record Company Ltd in the 1960s and 1970s, moving to Seaward Ltd (his own company) licensed to EMI in the 1980s. He also regularly broadcast on BBC Radio 2 with his own orchestra as well as with the BBC Radio Orchestra and the BBC Scottish Radio Orchestra, based at BBC Glasgow. Aldrich also recorded special tracks that were released by Reader's Digest. All the Decca recordings have been released on CD format by Vocalion. Many of his sessions for radio stations have been released by Apple iTunes in m4a format.

He was appointed musical director at Thames Television, and thus was widely known as the musical director for the television programme The Benny Hill Show. He was married twice and had a daughter from his first marriage. At the time of his death, he was married to Edith Mary Aldrich (1919–2006), his wife for more than 30 years. In later years he moved to the Isle of Man where he lived with his wife in Strathallan Castle, formerly the Clifton Hotel, in Port St. Mary, but he continued to work in London, where he remained a member of the local Branch of the Musicians Union. He died of prostate cancer at age 77 on 30 September 1993 in Clatterbridge, Cheshire. He found his final rest at St. Luke's Churchyard, Baldwin Braddan, Middle, Isle of Man.

== Discography ==
Ronnie Aldrich and the Squadcats

- All Time Hits of Jazz, Ace of Clubs (ACL 1020) 1960 Remastered and re-released 13/10/09 as "All Time Jazz Hits", on double CD with "Top of the World".

Decca Discography "Ronnie Aldrich And His Two Pianos"

- Melody and Percussion for Two Pianos, Decca Phase 4 PFS34007 (SP-44007) 1961
- Ronnie Aldrich and His Two Pianos, Decca Phase 4 PFS4019 (SP-44018) 1962
- The Magnificent Pianos of Ronnie Aldrich, London Phase 4 SP-44029 1963
- The Romantic Pianos of Ronnie Aldrich, London Phase 4 SP-44042 1964
- Christmas with Ronnie Aldrich, London Phase 4 SP-44051 1964
- The Magic Mood of Ronnie Aldrich, Decca Phase 4 PFS4064 (SP-44062) 1965
- That Aldrich Feeling, Decca Phase 4 PFS4076 (SP-44070) 1965
- All-Time Piano Hits, London Phase 4 SP-44081 1966
- Where The Sun Is, Decca Phase 4 PFS4106 1966
- Two Pianos in Hollywood, Decca Phase 4 PFS4108 (SP-44092) 1967 (*)
- Two Pianos Today!, Decca Phase 4 PFS4132 (SP-44100) 1967
- For Young Lovers, Decca Phase 4 PFS4141 (SP 44108) 1968
- This Way "In", Decca Phase 4 PFS4152 (SP-44116) 1968
- It's Happening Now, Decca Phase 4 PFS 4159 (SP-44127) 1969
- Destination Love, Decca Phase 4 PFS4179 (SP 44135) 1969
- Togetherness, Decca Phase 4 DDS 2, 1970
  - Here Come the Hits!, London Phase 4 SP-44143 1970 (**)
  - Close to You, London H-17156 1970 (**)
- Love Story, Decca Phase 4 PFS4222 (SP-44162) 1971
- Great Themes To Remember, Decca Phase 4 1971
- Invitation To Love, Decca Phase 4 PFS4242 (SP-44176) 1972
- Come to Where the Love Is, Decca Phase 4 PFS4264 (SP 44190) 1972
- The Phase 4 World of Burt Bacharach, Decca Phase 4 SPA193, 1972
- Soft And Wicked, Decca Phase 4 PFS4268 (SP-44195 H-17195) 1973
- Top of the World, London Phase 4 SP-44203, 1973
- The Way We Were, Decca Phase 4 PFS4300 (SP 44209) 1974
- In the Gentle Hours, Decca Phase 4 PFS 4329 (SP-44221), 1975
- Love, Decca Phase 4 PFS4361 (SP 44253) 1975
- Reflections, Decca Phase 4 PFS4377 (SP-44264) 1976
- Webb Country, Decca Phase 4 PFS4397 (SP-44278) 1977
- With Love & Understanding, Decca Phase 4 PFS4406 (SP-44286) 1977 (Evergreen USA)
- Melodies from the Classics, Decca Phase 4 PFS 4424(SP-44300) 1978
- Emotions, Decca Phase 4 PFS4436 (SP-44310) 1978

(PFS is the Decca (UK) original catalogue number; SP is the London label (USA) version) / (*) Also issued as "Romantic Screen Themes" in Japan (London SLC4484) / (**) Togetherness (UK double-disc set) was issued as two separate albums in the USA

Decca (Polygram) Discography (One Piano)

- Tomorrow's Yesterdays, Decca PFS4436 1979
- For The One You Love, Decca SKL5319 1980

Amberjack Discography (One Piano)

- One Fine Day, Amberjack 902, 1981
- Imagine, Amberjack 1981
- Beautiful Music, Amberjack 1982
- Silver Bells/Winter Wonderland, Amberjack

Seaward Music recordings licensed to EMI (One Piano)

- Night Birds, EMI MFP 1982
- Sea Dreams, EMI MFP 1984
- For All Seasons, EMI MFP 6016 1987
- Ronnie Aldrich, his Piano and Orchestra, EMI CC220 1988 (compilation album)

Seaward also issued a vinyl LP, The Wonderful World of Man, which contained recordings of the sounds of the Isle of Man, where Ronnie Aldrich lived from the 1960s onwards. This record was sold in the island to tourists.

Decca Discography "The New Big Band"

- Today - In The Old Fashioned Way, Decca Phase 4 1977

== Titles recorded by album ==
Melody and Percussion for Two Pianos (1961) (No. 20 on the Billboard Top LPs)

- Unforgettable - Gordon
- Secret Love - Webster/Fain
- To Each His Own - Livingstone/Evans
- Ruby - Roemheld/Parish
- April in Portugal - Ferrao/Kennedy
- My One and Only Love - Mellin/Wood
- Autumn Leaves - Kosma/Mercer
- Misty - Garner/Burke
- Golden Earrings - Young
- Young at Heart - Richards/Leigh
- April Love - Webster/Fain
- The Gypsy - Reid

Ronnie Aldrich and His Two Pianos (1962) (No. 36 on the Billboard Top LPs)

- Liebestraum - Liszt
- Reverie - Debussy
- Story of a Starry Night - Hoffman/Curtis/Livingstone
- Till the End of Time - Kaye/Mossman
- Story of Three Loves - Paganini, arr. Rachmaninoff
- Full Moon and Empty Arms - Kaye/Mossman
- Stranger in Paradise - Wright/Forrest
- Clair de Lune - Debussy, arr. Aldrich
- Baubles, Bangles and Beads - Wright/Forrest
- Theme from "Goodbye Again" - Auric/Langdom
- Tonight We Love - Worth, Austin/Martin
- I'm Always Chasing Rainbows - Carroll /McCarthy

The Magnificent Pianos of Ronnie Aldrich (1963)

- "Ebb Tide" - Maxwell/Sigman
- The Very Thought of You - Noble
- I'll Be Seeing You - Fain
- Love Letters - Young
- Long Ago and Far Away - Jerome Kern
- How Deep is the Ocean - Berlin
- Smoke Gets in Your Eyes - Jerome Kern
- Stella by Starlight - Young
- Among My Souvenirs - Nicholls
- Darn That Dream - Van Heusen
- Evening Star - R. Aldrich
- Where or When - Rodgers

The Romantic Pianos of Ronnie Aldrich (1964)

- Deep Purple - DeRose
- More Than You Know - Youmans
- I'll never smile again - Lowe
- Embraceable you - Gershwin
- Don't blame me - McHugh/
- I have dreamed - Rodgers/Hammerstein
- September song - Weill/Anderson
- I'm in the mood for love - McHugh/Fields
- If I loved you - Rodgers/Hammerstein
- Lonely lover - R. Aldrich
- Moonlight in Vermont - Blackburn/Suessdorf
- Spring will be a little late this year - Loesser

Christmas with Ronnie Aldrich (1964)

- White Christmas - Berlin
- Let it snow - Cahn/Styne
- Winter wonderland - Bernard/Smith
- Silver bells - Evans/Livingstone
- Sleigh ride - Leroy Anderson
- Have yourself a merry little Christmas - Martin/Blane
- Toyland - Victor Herbert
- I'll be home for Christmas - Gannon/Kent/Ram
- By the fireside - Robert Schumann
- Count tour blessings - Berlin
- Christmas waltz - Cahn/Styne
- The Christmas song - Torme/Wells

The Magic Mood of Ronnie Aldrich (1965)

- Charade - Henry Mancini
- Felicidade - Antonio Carlos Jobim
- I've grown accustomed to her face - Loewe/Lerner
- Ship of dreams - R. Aldrich
- I left my heart in San Francisco - Cross/Cory
- "Softly, as I Leave You" - DeVita, Calabrese/Shaper
- How soon - Mancini/Stillman
- I wish you love - Trenet/Beach
- "The Girl from Ipanema" - Jobim
- The sound of music - Rodgers/Hammerstein
- Gardens in Ibiza - Aldrich
- People - Styne/Merrill

That Aldrich Feeling (1965)

- My favorite things - Richard Rodgers-Oscar Hammerstein II
- Moonglow and theme from "Picnic" - Will Hudson-Eddie DeLange
- Melodie d'amour - Leo Johns - Henri Salvador
- Mona Lisa - Jay Livingston - Ray Evans
- Magic moments - Burt Bacharach/Hal David
- When I fall in love - Victor Young/ Edward Heyman (erroneously named as "Herman")
- Memories are made of this - Terry Gilkyson - Richard Dehr
- Spanish Harlem - Jerry Leiber - Phil Spector
- The sweetest sounds - Richard Rodgers
- Come closer to me (Acércate más - Real title) - Osvaldo Farrés
- If the rains got to fall - David Heneker
- If ever I would leave you - Alan Jay Lerner - Frederick Loewe

All-Time Piano Hits (1966)

- Miserlou - Roubanis
- Bewitched - Rodgers
- Nola - Arndt
- Stardust - Hoagy Carmichael
- Near you - Craig
- Dancing in the dark - Schwartz
- Autumn leaves - Kosma
- Voodoo moon - Noro Morales
- As time goes by - Hupfeld
- Inka dinka doo - Ryan/Durante
- Canadian sunset - Haywood/Gimbel
- Exodus - Gold

Where The Sun Is (1966)

- La playa - van Wetter
- Je te rechaufferai - Aznavour
- Strangers when we meet - Duning/Quine
- Nuages - Reinhardt/Larue
- Merveilleuse Angelique - Magne
- Till - Sigman/Danvers
- La bohème - Plante/Aznavour
- "Cast Your Fate to the Wind" - Guaraldi/Werber
- Anema e core - D'Esposito/Manlio/Goell
- Sabor a mi - Carillo/Mitchell
- Are You Lonesome Tonight? - Turk/Handman
- Michelle - Lennon/McCartney

Two Pianos in Hollywood (1967)

- The shadow of your smile - Mandel/Webster
- Lara's theme - Webster/Jarre
- Strangers in the night - Kaempfert/Singleton
- Chim chim cheree - Richard & Robert Sherman
- Limelight - Charles Chaplin
- The Bible - Mayuzumi
- Who's afraid of Virginia Woolf? - North/Webster
- Moulin Rouge - Auric/Larue
- More - Oliviero/Ortolani
- The apartment - Williams
- A patch of blue - Goldsmith/Wayne
- Lawrence of Arabia - Jarre

Two Pianos Today! (1967)

- You only live twice - Barry/Bricusse
- A whiter shade of pale - Reed/Brooker
- Georgy girl - Springfield/Dale
- Somethin' stupid - Parks
- A man and a woman - Lai/Barouh
- My cup runneth over - Jones/Schmidt
- Don't sleep in the subway - Hatch/Trent
- Release me - Miller/Stevenson
- Barefoot in the park - Hefti/Mercer
- Alfie - David/Bacharach
- Music to watch girls by - Ramin
- This is my song - Charles Chaplin

For Young Lovers (1968)

- Ode to Billie Joe - Gentry
- What the world needs now - Bacharach/David
- Love is blue - Popp/Cour
- Sunny - Hebb
- I think I'm going out of my head - Randazzo/Weinstein
- The impossible dream - Darion/Leigh
- Baby, now that I've found you - Macaulay/Macleod
- Valley of the dolls - A. Previn/D. Previn
- It must be him - Gilbert Becaud/David
- Up, up and away - Webb
- To sir with love - London/Black
- Born free - Barry/Black

This Way "In" (1968)

- This guy's in love with you - Bacharach/David
- MacArthur Park - Webb
- Blowin' in the wind - Bob Dylan
- Do it again - Wilson/Love
- Honey - Russell
- Time - Aldrich/Hendrix
- Mrs. Robinson - Simon
- By the time I get to Phoenix - Webb
- Mas que nada - Jorge Ben
- Theme from "The fox" - Lalo Schifrin
- A man without love - Panzeri/Pace
- Something here in my heart - Macleod Macaulay

It's Happening Now (1969)

- Hey Jude - Lennon/McCartney
- Ride my see-saw - Lodge
- Concierto de Aranjuez - Joaquín Rodrigo
- Light my fire - Morrison/Manzarek
- Scarborough fair - Trad., arr. Aldrich
- Both sides now - Mitchell
- Theme from "Elvira Madigan" - Mozart, arr. Aldrich
- Soulful strut - Record/Sanders
- The nature of love - R. Aldrich
- I've gotta be me - Marks
- Little green apples - Russell
- For once in my life - Miller/Murden

Destination Love (1969)

- My cherie amour - Cosby/Wonder
- Aquarius - Rado/Ragni
- Midnight cowboy - Barry
- Classical gas - Williams
- Quentin's theme - Cobert
- Wichita lineman - Webb
- Baby I love you - Barry
- The windmills of your mind - Legrand/Bregman
- Theme from In the dark - Aldrich
- Love Me Tonight - Lorenzo Pilat/Mario Panzeri/Barry Mason
- Love theme from "Romeo and Juliet" - Nino Rota
- Good Morning Starshine - James Rado/Gerome Ragni/Galt MacDermot

Togetherness (1970)

- "Airport" Love Theme - Newman +
- Raindrops keep falling on my head - Bacharach/David +
- Arizona - Young +
- Bridge over troubled water - Simon +
- Sugar, sugar - Barry/Kim +
- Daydream - Vincent/Van Holmen +
- Venus - Van Leeuwen +
- Because - Lennon/McCartney +
- United we stand - Hiller/Simons +
- Girl on the Via Veneto - R. Aldrich +
- Let it be - Lennon/McCartney +
- My heart reminds me (Autumn concerto) - Bargoni/Siegel +
- Something - Harrison ++
- Don't play that song - Ertegün ++
- The long and winding road - Lennon/McCartney ++
- Papier-mâché - Bacharach/David ++
- Make it with you - Gates ++
- Snowbird - MacLellan ++
- Cecilia - Simon ++
- Close to you - Bacharach/David ++
- Rider on the rain - Francis Lai ++
- My baby loves lovin' - Cook ++
- The sound of silence - Paul Simon ++
- Sun-dance - R. Aldrich ++

Released as two separate albums in US: Here Come The Hits! (+) and Close to You (++)

Love Story (1971) (No. 169 on the Billboard Top LPs)

- It's impossible - Armando Manzanero
- I never promised you a rose garden - South
- My sweet Lord - Harrison
- Mr. Bojangles - Walker
- Woodstock - Mitchell
- I think I love you - Romeo
- Amazing grace - Trad. arr Aldrich
- What is life - Harrison
- Theme from "Love story" - Lai/Sigman
- Candida - Wine/Levine
- El cóndor pasa - Robles
- Togetherness - R. Aldrich

The Phase 4 World of Burt Bacharach (1971)

- Wives and lovers – Bacharach/David
- Alfie* – Bacharach/David
- Odds and ends – Bacharach/David
- Where there's a heartache – Bacharach/David
- This guy's in love with you* – Bacharach/David
- (They long to be) Close to you* – Bacharach/David
- "What the World Needs Now Is Love"* – Bacharach/David
- Raindrops keep fallin' on my head* – Bacharach/David
- The April fools – Bacharach/David
- Papier-mâché* – Bacharach/David
- The look of love – Bacharach/David
- (* previously released)

Great Themes to Remember (1972)

- Symphony No. 40 - Mozart
- Meditation - Massenet
- Serenade - Schubert
- None but the lonely heart - Tchaikovsky
- Vocalise - Rachmaninoff
- Bacarolle - Offenbach/Guiraud/Barbier/Carre
- Nocturne - Borodin
- Serenade - Mozart
- Nocturne - Chopin
- Air on the G string - Bach
- Theme from piano concerto No. 21 - Mozart

Invitation to Love (1972)

- Cherish - Kirkman
- Gypsys, tramps and thieves - Stone
- Theme from "Summer of 42" - Legrand
- I'd like to teach the world to sing - Backer/Davis
- Baby, I'm-a want you - Gates
- Theme from "The Onedin Line" - Kachaturian, arr Aldrich
- Theme from "The go-between" - Legrand
- I could be happy with you - Wilson
- Imagine - John Lennon
- Invitation to love - Taylor/Wolfson
- Diamonds are forever - Barry/Black

Come to Where The Love Is (1972)

- Love theme from "The Godfather" - Nino Rota
- Alone again (Naturally) - R. O'Sullivan
- Song sung blue - Neil Diamond
- The impossible dream - M. Leigh/J. Darion
- Popcorn - Kingsley
- Where is the love - Salter/MacDonald
- Theme from "Lost horizon" - Bacharach/David
- The candy man - Bricusse/Newley
- Without you - Evans/Ham
- Come to where the love is - Taylor/Marc
- Breaking Up Is Hard to Do - Sedaka/Greenfield
- Jenny's theme from "Young Winston" - A. Ralston

Soft and Wicked (1973)

- Last tango in Paris - Gato Barbieri
- You're so vain - Simon
- Aubrey - Gates
- Tie a yellow ribbon round the old oak tree - Levine/Brown
- Clair - O'Sullivan
- Call me (come back home) Gree/Mitchell/Jackson
- Good time Charlie - O'Keefe
- Oh babe, what would you say - Smith
- Killing me softly with his song - Fox/Gimbel
- Last song - Evoy
- Love theme from "The Valachi Papers" - Ortolani
- It Never Rains in Southern California - Albert Hammond/Lee Hazlewood

Top of The World (1973)

- Top of the world - R. Carpenter/J. Bettis
- Summer (The first time) - B. Goldsboro
- Vado via - E. Riccardi/L. Albertelli
- If I asked my heart - B. Taylor/R. Marc
- Ashes to ashes - D. Lambert/B. Potter
- I got a name - C. Fox/M. Gimbel
- Jesse - J. Ian
- Say, has anybody seen my sweet gypsy rose - I. Levine/L. Brown
- Children of Rome - S. Myers
- Touch me in the morning - M. Masser/R. Miller

The Way We Were (1974)

- Love's theme - B. White
- The way we were - M. Hamlisch/A. Bergman
- Leave me alone (Ruby red dress) - D. & M. Laurie
- I'll have to say I love you in a song - J. Croce
- Have you heard - M. Pinder
- Last time I saw him - M. Masser/P. Sawyer
- What are you doing the rest of your life? - M. Legrand/A. Bergman
- Wave - Antonio Carlos Jobim
- Happiness is me and you - O'Sullivan
- Dark lady - J. Durrill

In The Gentle Hours (1975)

- In the gentle hours - Aldrich
- You make me feel brand new - Bell/Creed
- She - Charles Aznavour/Kretzmer
- The entertainer - Joplin
- And I love you so - McLean
- Everybody's talkin' - Neil
- The first time ever I saw your face - MacColl
- Meditation - Antonio Carlos Jobim
- The old-fashioned way - Garvarentz/Aznavour
- Yesterday - Lennon/McCartney
- You are the sunshine of my life - Stevie Wonder
- Didn't we - Webb

Love (1975)

- Love - R. Aldrich
- Quiet nights of quiet stars - Antonio Carlos Jobim
- The nearness of you - H. Carmichael
- I didn't know what time it was - R. Rodgers/L. Hart
- Once upon a summertime - M. Legrand
- All the things you are - J. Kern/O. Hammerstein
- Days of wine and roses - H. Mancini/J. Mercer
- I will wait for you - M. Legrand/N. Gimbel
- Tenderly - W. Gross/J. Lawrence
- The sound of love - B. Taylor/R. Marc
- Watch what happens - M. Legrand/N. Gimbel
- The party's over - J. Styne/B. Comden

Reflections (1976)

- Summer's end - R. Aldrich
- Never gonna fall in love again - E. Carmen
- Times of your life - R. Nichols/B. Lane
- Spanish eyes - E. Snyder/B. Kaempfert
- Save your kisses for me - T. Hiller/L. Sheriden
- How insensitive - A. Jobim/V. DeMoraes
- Adagio - Trad, arr Aldrich
- On days like these - D. Black/Q. Jones
- Scarlet ribbons - E. Danzig/J. Segal
- Love is a many splendored thing - F. Webster/S. Fain
- All by myself - E. Carmen

Today in the Old Fashioned Way (1977)

- I'd like to teach the world to s(w)ing
- The way we were
- Sing
- The old fashioned way
- Wonderful baby
- Oh Babe, what would you say
- You are the sunshine of my life
- (They long to be) close to you
- There's a kind of hush
- Song sung blue
- Clair
- Tie a yellow ribbon round the old oak tree

Webb Country (1977)

- MacArthur Park - Jim Webb
- Lovers such as I - Jim Webb
- By the time I get to Phoenix - Jim Webb
- Paper chase - Jim Webb
- Wichita lineman - Jim Webb
- Galveston - Jim Webb
- Didn't we - Jim Webb
- Walk in the sunshine - Jim Webb
- The moon is a harsh mistress - Jim Webb
- Up, up and away - Jim Webb

With Love and Understanding (1977)

- A little love and understanding - Becaud/Amade
- Evergreen - Williams/Streisand
- Forever and ever - Vlavianos/Costandinos
- Feelings - Albert
- Dancing queen - S. Anderson/Ulvaeus
- When a child is born - Zacar/Jay *
- When forever has gone - Vlavianos/Mason
- Nadia's theme - DeVorzan/Botkin
- Theme from "King Kong" - Barry
- Summer of my life - May
- Aria - Bembo/Bardotti
- Gabriella - R. Aldrich

Released as "Evergreen" in US. (*)not included in American release.

Melodies from The Classics (1978)

- Pavane - Faure
- Rondò alla turca - Mozart
- Cavatina - Raff
- Moment musical - Schubert
- Gymnopedie - Satie
- Andaluzia (Spanish dance Nº 5) - Granados
- Badinerie (from suite Nº 2) - Bach
- Adagio (from sonata Pathetique) - Beethoven
- La mattinata de Leoncavallo
- Romance (from violin concerto Nº 2) - Wieniawski
- Anitra's dance (from Peer Gynt) - Grieg
- Reverie - Debussy

Emotions (1978)

- Emotions - B. Gibb/R. Gibb
- Exotica - R. Aldrich
- The name of the game - B. Anderson/B. Ulvaeus
- How deep is your love - B. Gibb/M. Gibb
- Star wars suite: a) Main theme b) Cantina band c) Princess theme - J. Williams
- Take a chance on me - Anderson/Ulvaeus
- Cavatina - S. Myers/H Shaper
- Just for you - A. Price
- Don't cry for me Argentina from "Evita" - A. Lloyd-Webber/T. Rice
- You Light up my life - J. Brooks
- Suite from Close encounters of the third kind - J. Williams

Tomorrow's Yesterdays (1979)

- A Certain Smile - Webster/Fain
- I'm stone in love with you - Bell/Creed/Bell
- Tomorrow's Yesterdays - R. Aldrich
- When I need you - Hammond/Sayer
- Desafinado - Jobim/Cavanaugh/Hendricks/Mendonca
- Nights in white satin - Hayward
- The fool on the hill - Lennon/McCartney
- I say a little prayer - Bacharach/David
- I'm not in love - Goddman/Stewart
- Love me tender - Presley/Matson
- If you leave me now - Cetera
- Lucy in the sky with diamonds - Lennon/McCartney

For The One You Love (1980)

- You needed me - Goodrum
- The main event/Fight - Jabara/Roberts
- She believes in me - Gibb
- Just when I needed you most - Vanwarmer
- Can't smile without you - Arnold/Martin/Morrow
- I know I'll never love this way again - Kerr/Jennings
- Gypsomania - R. Aldrich
- Reunited - Feskaris/Perren
- Just the way you are - Joel
- You take my breath away - Lawrence/Hart
- You're the only one - Sager/Roberts
- After the love has gone - Foster/Graydon/Champlin

One Fine Day (1981)

- Woman in love
- One fine day
- Shadow waltz
- Fame
- On Broadway
- Stand by me
- Reminiscing
- Autumn tears
- Magic
- Romeo's tune

Silver Bells / Winter Wonderland (1981)

- Winter wonderland
- Silent night
- The holly and the ivy
- O come all ye faithful
- Sleigh ride
- Let it snow
- White Christmas
- Silver bells
- The Christmas song
- Jingle bells

Imagine (1981)

- It's my turn
- So far away
- Crying
- Blue skies
- Imagine
- Should I´ve ever let her go
- Blessed are the believers
- Super trouper
- Intermezzo
- Put your hand on my shoulder
- I made it through the rain
- I'm happy just to dance with you
- California girls
- She's out of my life
- Morning train
- What kind of fool
- I remember
- Sexy eyes
- Daytime friends
- Cupid

Night Birds (1982)

- Beguin the begine - Porter
- Arthur's theme - Bacharach
- Memory from ¨Cats¨ - Lloyd Webber
- Santa Catalina - R. Aldrich
- Hill street blues - Post
- Chariots of fire - Vangelis
- Night birds - Sharpe
- Have you ever been in love? - Danter/Hill/Sinfield
- A little peace - Siegel/Meinunger/Greedus
- Albareda - R. Aldrich
- Stay - Manilow
- For Lisa - Beethoven arr. Aldrich

Sea Dreams (1984)

- La mer - Trenet
- Hello - Richie
- Sailing by - Binge
- Bermuda triangle - Manilow
- The sound of the sea - R. Aldrich
- The last farewell - Whitaker
- Calypso - Denver
- Stranger on the Shore - Bilk
- Sailing - Sutherland
- Trade winds - R. Aldrich
- All the girls I´ve loved before - Hammond/David
- How deep is the ocean? - Berlin

For All Seasons (1987)

- April in Paris - Duke/Harburg
- Spring song - Mendelssohn arr. Aldrich
- It might as well be spring - Rodgers/Hammerstein II
- Summertime - Gershwin/Heyward
- The solway in summer - R. Aldrich
- Summer wind - Mayer
- Early autumn - Herman/Burns/Mercer
- September song - Weill/Anderson
- Forever autumn - Osbourne/Vigrass/Wayne
- When winter comes - R. Aldrich
- Winter world of love - Reed/Mason
- June in January - Rainger/Robin

== Other sources ==
- Ronnie Aldrich (Obituary), The Times (London, England), 15 October 1993, p. 21
- Ronnie Aldrich (Obituary), The Daily Telegraph (London, England), 9 October 1993, p. 21
