= Love Me Tonight (Tom Jones song) =

1969 song

Single by Tom Jones
- B-side: "Hide and Seek"
- Released: May 1969
- Genre: Pop
- Length: 3:15
- Label: Parrot
- Songwriters: Daniele Pace, Lorenzo Pilat, Mario Panzeri, Barry Mason
- Producer: Peter Sullivan

Tom Jones singles chronology
"A Minute of Your Time" (1968)	"Love Me Tonight" (1969)	"Without Love (There Is Nothing)" (1969)

"Love Me Tonight" is a song performed by Tom Jones. It peaked at #2 on the adult contemporary chart, #9 on the UK Singles Chart, and #13 on the Billboard Hot 100 the week of July 19, 1969.

The song was arranged by Johnnie Spence and produced by Peter Sullivan.

The song ranked #94 on Billboard magazine's Top 100 singles of 1969.

== Original song ==
"Alla fine della strada"

Single by Junior Magli
- B-side: "Il mio amico angelo"
- Released: January 1969
- Length: 2:48
- Label: Jolly
- Songwriters: Lorenzo Pilat, Mario Panzeri, Daniele Pace

Junior Magli singles chronology
"La nostra favola" (1968)	"Alla fine della strada" (1969)	"Apri la porta" (1969)

"Love Me Tonight" is a reworked English-language version of the Italian song "Alla fine della strada" ("To the End of the Road"), which was written by Lorenzo Pilat, with lyrics by Mario Panzeri and Daniele Pace, and performed by Junior Magli and the Casuals at the Sanremo Music Festival 1969. British author and songwriter Barry Mason wrote the English lyrics, which bear no relation to the original Italian.

== Other versions ==
- Ronnie Aldrich and His Two Pianos featuring the London Festival Orchestra released a version of the song on their 1969 album Destination Love.
- The Casuals released a version of the song on their 1969 album Hour World.
- Ray Conniff and The Singers released a version of the song on their 1969 album Jean.
- Martin Denny released a version of the song on his 1969 album Exotic Moog.
- Ted Heath and His Music released a version of the song on their 1969 album The Big Ones.
- James Last released a version of the song on his 1969 album Non Stop Dancing 9.
- Johnny Mathis released a version of the song on his 1969 album Love Theme from "Romeo And Juliet" (A Time for Us).
- Mantovani released a version of the song on his 1969 album The World of Mantovani.
- The Alan Caddy Orchestra & Singers released a version of the song on their 1970 album The Tom Jones Story.
- Arthur Fiedler and the Boston Pops Orchestra released a version of the song on their 1971 album Arthur Fiedler Superstar.
- Pink Lady released a version of the song on their 1979 album Kiss in the Dark.
