= La pioggia =

- Cover art of the version by Gigliola Cinquetti

Single by Gigliola Cinquetti and France Gall
- Language: Italian
- B-side: "Zero in amore" (Cinquetti); "Matrimonio d'amore" (Gall)
- Released: 1969
- Label: Compagnia Generale del Disco
- Songwriters: Gianni Argenio; Corrado Conti; Daniele Pace; Mario Panzeri

Gigliola Cinquetti singles chronology
"Quelli erano i giorni" (1968)	"La pioggia" (1969)	"Il treno dell'amore" (1969)

France Gall singles chronology
"Mon p'tit soldat" (1968)	"La pioggia" (1969)	"Baci, baci, baci" (1969)

"La pioggia" (transl. "The Rain") is a song written by Italian songwriters Gianni Argenio, Corrado Conti, Daniele Pace and Mario Panzeri. It was originally performed by singers Gigliola Cinquetti and France Gall at the Sanremo Music Festival 1969, where it reached sixth place. Multiple versions of the song were released as singles, including a French-language adaptation by Jean-Michel Rivat and Frank Thomas, titled "L'Orage" (transl. "The Thunderstorm"). Cinquetti's release of the original version peaked at number two on the Italian singles chart, and was later included on the 1969 album Il treno dell'amore.

== Release history ==
"La pioggia" was presented at the 1969 edition of the Sanremo Music Festival, one of Italy's most influential musical showcases. In accordance with the festival's tradition of the time, the song was performed in two separate renditions: one by Italian singer Gigliola Cinquetti, and another by French singer – and fellow Eurovision Song Contest winner – France Gall. The song achieved a sixth-place finish in the final, a result that nonetheless translated into strong commercial resonance beyond the festival stage. Cinquetti's version reached second place on the Italian hit parade and remained on the chart for eleven consecutive weeks, marking one of her most successful releases of the decade. Gall's version also entered the Italian charts, peaking at number twenty.

Besides their recordings of the Italian-language version, Cinquetti and Gall each released French and Spanish-language adaptations of the song: "L'Orage", with lyrics by Jean-Michel Rivat and Frank Thomas, and "La lluvia", with lyrics by Alfonso Alpin. Gall's rendition of "L'Orage" appeared on the extended play Homme tout petit (1969), and was later included on the compilation albums France Gall (1969) and Ses grands succès (1973). Cinquetti further expanded the song's international reach with the German version "Regen", written by Lilibert, and the Greek version "Ki' an vréchei" (Κι' αν βρέχει), written by Giorgos Papastefanou.

== Charts ==
=== Weekly charts ===
Versions by Gigliola Cinquetti
Chart (1969)	Peak position
Belgium (Ultratop 50 Wallonia)	7
Italy (Singles Top 50)	2

Versions by France Gall
Chart (1969)	Peak position
Belgium (Ultratop 50 Flanders)	17
Belgium (Ultratop 50 Wallonia)	3
Italy (Singles Top 50)	20

== Notable covers ==
- In 1976, a Japanese-language cover, titled "Ame" (雨), was released by Chieko Baisho.
- In 2025, a bilingual Italian and French remix was released by Italian DJ Get Far.
