= Lettera a Pinocchio =

Single by Johnny Dorelli
- B-side: "Ginge Rock"
- Released: 1959
- Genre: Pop, easy listening
- Label: Compagnia Generale del Disco
- Songwriter: Mario Panzeri

Johnny Dorelli singles chronology
"Petite fleur" (1959)	"Lettera a Pinocchio" (1959)	"Amore senza sole" (1960)

Audio
- "Lettera a Pinocchio" on YouTube

"Lettera a Pinocchio" is a 1959 Italian song composed by Mario Panzeri. The song premiered at the first edition of the children song festival Zecchino d'Oro. In spite of not winning the competition, the song got a large commercial success thanks to the version recorded by Johnny Dorelli, at the time very popular thanks to the two Sanremo Music Festival he had just won in couple with Domenico Modugno, with the songs "Volare" and "Piove (Ciao, ciao bambina)".

The song was later covered by numerous artists, including Rita Pavone, Gigliola Cinquetti, Duo Fasano, Gino Latilla, Marino Marini, Rosanna Fratello, Mino Reitano, Quartetto Cetra, Jenny Luna, Robertino, Andrea Balestri. In 1964 Tony Renis recorded the song with arrangement and production by Quincy Jones. Bing Crosby recorded an English-language version of the song known as "A Letter to Pinocchio" or "My Heart Still Hears the Music" which was included in his album Holiday in Europe.

== Track listing ==
- 7" single – CGD – N 9154
1. "Lettera a Pinocchio" (Mario Panzeri)
2. "Ginge Rock" (Joe Beal, Jim Boothe, Mario Panzeri)

== Charts ==
Chart	Peak position
Italy	1
