= To the Door of the Sun =

1975 single by Al Martino

"To the Door of the Sun (Alle porte del sole)"

Single by Al Martino

from the album To the Door of the Sun
- Language: English
- B-side: "Mary Go Lightly"
- Released: 1975
- Genre: Easy listening
- Length: 3:20
- Label: Capitol
- Composers: Mario Panzeri; Lorenzo Pilat; Corrado Conti
- Lyricist: Norman Newell

Al Martino singles chronology
"Speak Softly Love" (1972)	"To the Door of the Sun (Alle porte del sole)" (1975)	"Volare" (1975)

"Alle porte del sole"

Single by Gigliola Cinquetti

from the album Alle porte del sole
- Language: Italian
- B-side: "Mister Chipp"
- Released: 1973
- Genre: Easy listening
- Composers: Mario Panzeri; Lorenzo Pilat; Corrado Conti
- Lyricist: Daniele Pace

Gigliola Cinquetti singles chronology
"Dio, come ti amo" (1966)	"Alle porte del sole" (1973)	"Sì" (1973)

"To the Door of the Sun (Alle porte del sole)" is a 1975 hit single by Al Martino and the title track of his LP. It is the English version of an Italian-language song by Gigliola Cinquetti, "Alle porte del sole" (pronounced [alle ˈpɔrte del ˈsoːle]), which was written by Daniele Pace, Mario Panzeri, Lorenzo Pilat and Corrado Conti, and released in 1973; the song won Canzonissima 1973.

Cinquetti had later recorded an English rendition of it, different from Martino's, which was released as a single by CBS Records in August 1974 with her original Italian version on the B-side; it reached number one in Argentina and number six in South Africa. Cinquetti also recorded French-, Spanish- and German- language versions of the song, respectively titled "Dernière histoire, premier amour", "A las puertas del cielo" and "Auf der Straße der Sonne".

In 1974, Katri Helena covered the song in Finnish under the title "Vasten auringon siltaa", with lyrics by Chrisse Johansson. A cover of this version was in turn recorded by Erin Anttila and released as a single in 2012, peaking at number 15 in the Finnish charts.

== Chart history ==
In early 1975, "To the Door of the Sun" reached number 17 on the U.S. Billboard Hot 100. It spent four months on the chart, equaling the chart run length of Martino's greatest hit, "I Love You Because" (#3, 1963).

"To the Door of the Sun" was a bigger Adult Contemporary hit, reaching number seven on the AC charts of both the United States and Canada. The song also charted in Australia. It became Martino's biggest hit of the 1970s.

=== Al Martino version ===
==== Weekly charts ====
Chart (1974–75)	Peak position
Australia (Kent Music Report)	13
Canadian RPM Top Singles	44
Canadian RPM Adult Contemporary	7
US Billboard Hot 100	17
US Billboard Adult Contemporary	7
US Cash Box Top 100	21

==== Year-end charts ====
Chart (1975)	Rank
Australia (Kent Music Report)	72
US (Joel Whitburn's Pop Annual)	149

=== Gigliola Cinquetti version ===
Chart (1974–75)	Peak position
Argentina (CAPIF)	1
Belgium (Ultratop 50 Wallonia)	49
South Africa (Springbok)	6
