= Ezio Leoni =

Italian composer (1927–2015)

Ezio Leoni (17 July 1927 in Milan – 22 February 2015 in Capriate San Gervasio) was one of the pioneering forces behind the Italian music scene of the "golden years" of Italy's musica leggera (popular music). A composer, arranger, orchestra conductor, producer and A&R executive, "Maestro" Leoni's contributions span from helping lay the foundation for Italian pop music in the 1950s and 1960s to opening the Southern European markets for some of the most influential American artists of the time. As a composer, he wrote the music of iconic Italian songs such as "24.000 baci", "Si è spento il sole", and "Il tuo bacio è come un rock", while as arranger/conductor, producer, and A&R executive he collaborated with Italian music personalities such as Adriano Celentano, Tony Dallara, Fausto Leali, Luigi Tenco, Franco Simone, Iva Zanicchi and Fausto Papetti, among many others.

Later in his life, Leoni focused his efforts on protecting and upholding the rights of Italian composers and publishers, holding positions of leadership within SIAE (Società Italiana Autori Editori), the Italian copyright agency for music, and UNCLA (Unione Nazionale Compositori Librettisti Autori) eventually becoming its Honorary President in 2011. Maestro Leoni's artists won the Sanremo Festival five times (Sanremo is often referred to as the Italian version of the United States' Grammy Awards, with the exception being that, unlike the Grammys, Sanremo only recognizes one official winner each year). He won three times with Iva Zanicchi ("Non pensare a me" – 1967; "Zingara" – 1969; "Ciao, cara, come stai?" – 1974), as well as with the group Homo Sapiens ("Bella da morire" – 1977) and singer Mino Vergnaghi ("Amare" – 1979). By the 1980s, Adriano Celentano was recognized as the singer with the highest number of number 1 singles on the Italian charts, while Fausto Papetti was recognized as the Italian artist with the highest number of albums ever sold, evidencing Maestro Ezio Leoni's level of impact on Italian pop music (as Leoni was instrumental in laying the foundation for the commercial success of both performers).

Leoni's collaboration with artists beyond the Italian borders started as early as the late 1950s with Chet Baker, when, working under the pseudonym of "Len Mercer", he led the orchestration and production of two albums between 1957 and 1959 (often referred to as The Milano Sessions), which started establishing Baker on the Italian and European music scene. In the 1960s, while A&R Executive at Ri-Fi, he was instrumental in securing the distributing rights for the Italian and other European territories for two of America's major labels, Motown Records and Atlantic Records, working directly with Berry Gordy (founder, Motown) and Ahmet Ertegun (co-founder, Atlantic), with whom he developed a close friendship. This agreement enabled the exposure to the Italian market for the two record labels' stable of artists, which at the time included Ben E. King, Otis Redding, James Brown, The Jackson 5, Marvin Gaye, Diana Ross, Stevie Wonder, Aretha Franklin, Led Zeppelin and Wilson Pickett, who, in 1968, joined Fausto Leali at Sanremo for the hit song Deborah.

Leoni also led other notable international artists to fame in the Italian market, many of whom, at the peak of their careers, performed original songs written and/or produced by Maestro Ezio Leoni and often also recorded versions of their original hit songs translated in the Italian language (a common practice at the time) under Leoni’s supervision. Examples of such artists include Ben E. King, Petula Clark, Tom Jones, Pat Boone, Françoise Hardy, Charles Aznavour as well as Elvis Presley’s backup singers The Sweet Inspirations.

Ezio Leoni's artists and songs are also featured in a number of motion picture soundtracks, including classics such as Federico Fellini's "La Dolce Vita" (which featured a stage performance by Adriano Celentano), "Profumo di Donna/Scent of a Woman", as well as more recent popular films such as Guy Richie's "Man from U.N.C.L.E.", which features the song "Che Vuole Questa Musica Stasera" in one of the film’s most iconic scenes for over two minutes uninterrupted by any dialogue or other form of sound. The song is performed by Peppino Gagliardi with Ezio Leoni and his orchestra.

Also recognized as a successful talent scout, Leoni was the first to offer the first recording contract to artists that eventually became some of Italy's most popular performers of all time, including Adriano Celentano, Tony Dallara and Fausto Leali, among many others. In the late 1960s, Campi Editore, one of Italy's major publishers appointed Leoni as General Manager of the recently founded DET Recording, a record label dedicated to promoting young talents, which would eventually bring to success notable new artists such as Peppino Gagliardi, as well as enable actors such as Catherine Spaak and Christian De Sica to venture out in the music industry with original songs. Leoni managed his DET commitments in Rome while also keeping his post as A&R Executive for Ri-Fi in Milan, a role he would keep until his retirement in the 1980s. Even after his retirement, Leoni continued to record on a project basis with established artists such as Fausto Papetti, while also keeping an eye out for new talent. In 1987, during a recording session he was introduced to Andrea Bocelli a young, visually impaired singer who was looking for his first break in music. Leoni, recognizing the young man's potential, established a relationship with him, and, working alongside Bocelli and the singer's future wife Enrica Cenzatti, presented the young singer's demo tape (newly recorded with the singer's original material) to a number of Italy's record labels, all of which turned him down not seeing a market for a pop singer with the voice of an opera tenor. Years after Leoni's full retirement from recording, and after years of rejections, Bocelli would finally catch his first break in the mid-1990s and become one of the world's most recognized and successful artists in the world.

In the 1990s, Maestro Ezio Leoni became increasingly involved on the policy aspect of protecting the rights of authors and publishers in Italy, and was elected to serve in different leadership roles within SIAE, Italy's copyright agency for music, and UNCLA. In 2011, he was nominated UNCLA's Honorary President, as recognition for the contributions made in the pioneering of the Italian music industry during the 20th century, and the rich legacy he left behind. Such honor had been previously awarded to Gorni Kramer, Ennio Morricone and Mogol, all of whom stand alongside Maestro Ezio Leoni as pillars of Italy's post-war music sound.
