= Holiday in Europe =

Studio album by Bing Crosby
- Released: 1962
- Recorded: May 8–9, 1961
- Studios: Radio Recorders, Hollywood
- Genre: Vocal pop
- Length: 31:14
- Label: Decca

Bing Crosby chronology
I Wish You a Merry Christmas (1962)	Holiday in Europe (1962)	Reprise Musical Repertory Theatre (set of 4 albums, including 3 albums featuring Crosby) (1963)

Professional ratings
Review scores
Source	Rating
New Record Mirror	4/5 stars

Holiday in Europe is the thirty-first solo studio album by American singer and actor Bing Crosby. It was recorded for Crosby’s own company, Project Records at Radio Recorders in Hollywood and issued by Decca Records (DL-4281) in 1962. The album consists of twelve European songs. The orchestral arrangements were by Bob Thompson and the orchestra was conducted by Malcolm Lockyer at Decca's West Hampstead, London studios in October 1960. Crosby had recorded four of the songs with Lockyer on October 15, 1960, in London but a decision was taken not to use these vocal tracks. Crosby subsequently over-dubbed his vocals on all of the orchestral tracks in May 1961. Malcolm Lockyer does not receive a credit on the album cover.

The album was issued on CD by MCA Victor, Inc., Japan (MVCM-294) in 1993. The album was also reissued as "Holiday In Europe (And Beyond!)" released in February 2019 by Sepia Records. The album included the original songs and along with other 14 songs.

== Reception ==
Variety magazine reviewed the album saying “In an indie master deal with Project Records, Bing Crosby comes under the Decca banner once again. The package peg is a global song roundup which has Crosby working his way through such entries as “Under Paris Skies,” “Morgen,” “Never on Sunday” and “Domenica”. It's flavorsome and pleasing.”

Crosby Post liked the album too. "Many of you must, like me, have wondered 'can Bing do it'? An album full of ballads, just six a side and with full orchestra backing? After the multi-tracked El Señor Bing and the Singalongs we were bound to have worries - but we need not have had for this is Bing's best album yet released of new material. It's Bing 1962, right bang up-to-date."

== Track listing ==
Side one
No.	Title	Writer(s)	Length
1.	"April in Portugal"	Raul Ferrão, José Galhardo, Jimmy Kennedy	3:06
2.	"C'est si bon"	Henri Betti, André Hornez, Jerry Seelen	2:49
3.	"Never on Sunday"	Manos Hadjidakis	2:47
4.	"More and More Amor"	C. A. Rossi, Alberto Testa, Dick Manning	2:38
5.	"Moment in Madrid"	Bill Katz, Ruth Roberts, Bob Thiele, Bob Thompson	2:05
6.	"Morgen"	Peter Moesser, Noel Sherman	2:19

Side two
No.	Title	Writer(s)	Length
1.	"Two Shadows on the Sand"	Madeline Karter, Maurice Vidalin, Gilbert Bécaud	2:56
2.	"Under Paris Skies"	Hubert Giraud, Jean Dréjac	2:27
3.	"Domenica"	Pietro Garinei, Gorni Kramer, Sandro Giovannini, Bing Crosby	2:35
4.	"Pigalle"	Charles Newman, Georges Koger, Georges Ulmer	2:26
5.	"My Heart Still Hears the Music (A Letter to Pinocchio)"	Madeline Karter, Mario Panzeri	2:33
6.	"Melancolie"	Richard Blake, Pierre Dudan, Alain Romans	2:33
