= Caro Theodorakis... Iva =

Studio album by Iva Zanicchi
- Released: July 1970
- Genre: Pop
- Length: 37:29
- Language: Italian
- Label: Ri-Fi
- Producer: Ezio Leoni

Iva Zanicchi chronology
Iva senza tempo (1970)	Caro Theodorakis... Iva (1970)	Caro Aznavour (1971)

Singles from Caro Theodorakis... Iva
- 1. "Un fiume amaro" Released: July 1970

Caro Theodorakis... Iva is the fifth studio album by Italian singer Iva Zanicchi, released in July 1970 by Ri-Fi.

== Overview ==
The album is dedicated to the Greek composer Mikis Theodorakis. The album mainly features Theodorakis songs already known in Greece and released in the late 1950s-the second half of the 1960s; the Italian translations of his songs are made mainly by Sandro Tuminelli. The album was arranged by Enrico Intra and produced by Ezio Leoni.

The album turned out to be one of the most successful in Zanicchi's career, it spent thirty-six weeks on the Italian albums chart, where it peaked at number four. The single released from the album, "Un fiume amaro", was also a success, reaching number two on the chart.

== Track listing ==
Side A
No.	Title	Writer(s)	Length
1.	"Un fiume amaro"	Dimitris Hristodoùlou; Mikis Theodorakis; Sandro Tuminelli	5:25
2.	"Il mio aprile"	Audrey Stainton Nohra; Theodorakis	3:02
3.	"Il tuo sorriso nella notte"	Mogol; Theodorakis	4:35
4.	"Per te"	Nohra; Theodorakis	3:05
5.	"Il sogno è fumo"	Theodorakis; Tuminelli	3:20

Side B
No.	Title	Writer(s)	Length
1.	"Sul nostro giorno amaro"	Theodorakis; Tuminelli	3:14
2.	"Il ragazzo che sorride"	Theodorakis; Vito Pallavicini	3:18
3.	"Cantico dei cantici"	Theodorakis; Tuminelli	7:54
4.	"Aspetta voce mia"	Hristodoùlou; Theodorakis; Tuminelli	3:36

== Charts ==
Chart performance for Caro Theodorakis... Iva
Chart (1970–1971)	Peak position
Italian Albums (Discografia Internazionale)	4
Italian Albums (Musica e dischi)	4
