= The Funny Face of the Godfather =

- Directed by: Franco Prosperi
- Written by: Mario Amendola; Bruno Corbucci
- Produced by: Dino De Laurentiis
- Starring: Alighiero Noschese; Minnie Minoprio
- Cinematography: Gábor Pogány
- Edited by: Alberto Gallitti
- Music by: Bruno Canfora
- Release date: 1973
- Running time: 100 minutes
- Country: Italy
- Language: Italian

The Funny Face of the Godfather (Italian: L'altra faccia del padrino) is a 1973 Italian parody film directed by Franco Prosperi. It is a spoof of Francis Ford Coppola's 1972 film The Godfather.

== Plot ==
The film partially follows the plotline of the 1972 film The Godfather but with numerous visual gags and sketch comedies along the way. One major difference is that the protagonist is a young man who acts disguised as the godfather.

Lenny Montana is the only actor to appear in both films.

== Cast ==
- Alighiero Noschese as Don Vito Monreale / Nick Buglione
- Minnie Minoprio as Bonnie
- Raymond Bussières as Don Gennaro Magliulo
- Lino Banfi as Rocky Canosa
- Fausto Tozzi as Tony Malonzo
- Stefano Satta Flores as Jimmy Salvozzo
- Elena Fiore as Godfather's Wife
- Haydée Politoff as Angelica Magliulo
- Lenny Montana as Saro
- Guido Leontini as Tom Iager
- Mario Pilar as Tartaglioni
- Romano Puppo as Godfather's Henchman
- Dada Gallotti

== See also ==
- List of Italian films of 1973
