= The Casuals =

British pop group of the 1960s/1970s

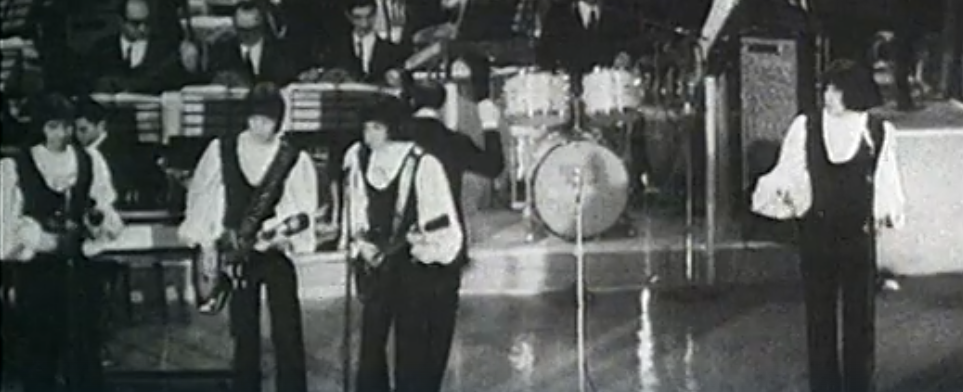
- The Casuals, 1969 Sanremo Music Festival

Background information
- Origin: Lincoln, England
- Genre: Pop music
- Years active: 1961–1976
- Labels: Fontana, Decca; Parlophone, Dawn
- Past members: John Tebb; Howard Newcomb; Don Fortune; Zenon Kowalski; Mick Bray; Ian Good; Alan "Plug" Taylor; Bob O'Brien; Chris Evans; Lloyd Courtney

The Casuals were a British pop group from Lincoln, Lincolnshire, England. They are best known for their 1968 No. 2 UK hit song, "Jesamine".

== Career ==
Originally formed in 1960 by John Tebb (piano and vocals) and Howard Newcomb (guitar), they added Don Fortune (drums) and Zenon Kowalski (bass), and became The Casuals in 1961. After turning professional, they moved to Italy and recorded a number of covers of well-known UK material. Fortune and Kowalski left, and were followed by a series of replacements, culminating in Mick Bray (drums) and Ian Good (bass), from other well-known Lincoln groups, The Avengers and The Sultans.

In 1965, they won the TV talent show Opportunity Knocks three times, leading to a recording contract with Fontana Records who issued their debut single "If You Walk Out", which was unsuccessful. In 1966, Alan "Plug" Taylor (bass) joined, and the band moved to Italy, where they signed with CBS in Milan to record Italian-language covers of British hit singles. These included a No. 1 Italian single covering the Bee Gees' "Massachusetts". Good left in mid 1967, and was not replaced, but when Bray left later that year, Bob O'Brien joined on drums (ex-Glasgow group The Riot Squad).

In 1968, whilst still in Italy, The Casuals switched to Decca Records, who released the single "Jesamine" in May, which – following extensive airplay on BBC Radio One – eventually charted, so the band came back from Italy to promote the record, which reached No. 2 on the UK Singles Chart late in 1968. "Jesamine" was a cover version of The Bystanders' "When Jesamine Goes" issued in February 1968, and was co-written by Marty Wilde and Ronnie Scott (the Bystanders' manager, not the famous jazz musician), under the pseudonym Frere Manston and Jack Gellar. The follow-up single, "Toy" (written by actor / musician Tim Andrews under his real name Chris Andrews) also made the Top 40, peaking at No. 30. They were also successful in Germany, where "Jesamine" hit No. 9, and "Toy" went to No. 27, but their first and only album, Hour World, was issued too late to capitalise on these successful singles. Chris Evans stood in for Newcombe when he was ill, and when Taylor and O'Brien left in 1970, Evans became a permanent member, along with Lloyd Courtney. None of the following four singles managed to chart, and the group was dropped by Decca in 1971.

They signed to Parlophone in 1972 and released "Tara Tiger Girl", but the single went nowhere, nor did a single "American Jam" for which the band was renamed 'American Jam Band', although, as both singles had the same B-side, the link was obvious. They left Parlophone for Dawn Records in 1974 and worked with producer Robin Blanchflower. But after their final single, "Good Times", flopped, they disbanded in 1976.

== Legacy ==
Paul Weller repeatedly referred to "Jesamine" as being one of his all-time favourite singles, including it on an 8 February 1998 BBC Radio One edition of All Back to Mine, where Weller played and discussed some of his record collection, and on a 2003 compilation of his favourite songs, Under the Influence.

== Key members ==
- Howard Newcombe – guitar, trumpet, vocals – (born 25 November 1945, Lincoln, Lincolnshire, England)
- Alan Taylor – bass – (born 2 February 1947, Halifax, West Yorkshire, England – died 27 November 2011, Bologna, Italy)
- Johnny Tebb – keyboards – (born John Roy Tebb, 1 October 1945, Lincoln, Lincolnshire, England - died 28 May 2018, south of France)
- Bob O'Brien – drums – (born Robert O'Brien, 26 September 1944, Bridge of Allan, Stirlingshire, Scotland)
- Mick Bray - drums - (born Michael Pompa, 21 May 1949, Lincoln)

== Discography ==
=== Singles ===
- "If You Walk Out" / "Please Don't Hide" – Fontana 1965
- "Adios Amour" / "Don't Dream of Yesterday" – Decca 1968
- "Jesamine" / "I've Got Something Too" – Decca 1968 – No. 2 UK, No.1 NZ
- "Toy" / "Touched" – Decca 1968 – No. 30 UK, No.6 NZ
- "Fools Paradise" / " Seven Times Seven" – Decca 1969
- "Sunflower Eyes" / "Never My Love" – Decca 1969
- "Caroline" / "Naughty Boy" – Decca 1969
- "My Name Is Love" / "I Can't Say" – Decca 1970
- "Tara Tiger Girl" / "Nature's Girl" – Parlophone 1972
- "Good Times" / "Witch" – Dawn 1974

As 'American Jam Band'

- "American Jam" / "Nature's Girl" – Parlophone 1972
- "Jam Jam" / "Back On The Road" - Young Blood International 1974

=== Albums ===
- Hour World - LP (June 1969) Decca (LK-R5001(mono), SLK-R5001 (stereo)

Track listing : Side one : "Jesamine", "Toyland", "Never My Love", "Fools Paradise", "Picnic", "Now You Can Be", "Daddy's Song" Side two : "Hello It's Me", "Love Me Tonight", "Someday Man", "Touched", "See", "Sunflower Eyes", "Hey-Hey-Hey", "Weather Vane"

- The Very Best of The Casuals – CD (1998) Commercial Marketing

=== Compilations ===
The Casuals version of "Jesamine" appears on a number of compilation albums including:-

- Sixties Power Ballads
- Under the Influence

== See also ==
- List of artists under the Decca Records label
