= Memo Remigi =

Italian singer-songwriter, composer, and television personality

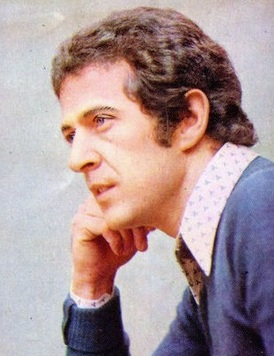
- Remigi in 1972
- Born: Emidio Remigi; 27 May 1938 (age 88); Erba, Lombardy, Kingdom of Italy
- Occupations: Singer; songwriter; television personality

Emidio "Memo" Remigi (born 27 May 1938) is an Italian singer, songwriter, and television personality.

== Life and career ==
Born in Erba, Lombardy, during his studies Remigi played piano in various groups. He debuted as a singer in 1963, winning the Liège Song Festival with the song "Oui, je sais". Having returned to Italy, Remigi obtained an immediate success with the song "Innamorati a Milano", which entered the Un disco per l'estate competition in 1965, then he alternated the activities of singer and of composer, composing songs for, among others, Ornella Vanoni and Iva Zanicchi. He also hosted several RAI television programs. He considers himself Roman Catholic.
