= Lorenzo Pilat =

Italian singer-songwriter (born 1938)

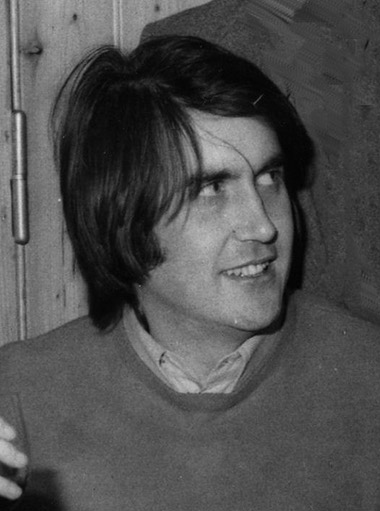
- Pilat in the 1970s

Background information
- Born: 24 June 1938 (age 88); Trieste, Kingdom of Italy
- Occupation: Singer-songwriter
- Years active: 1960s–1970s

Lorenzo Pilat (born 24 June 1938), also known as Pilade, is an Italian singer-songwriter and composer, mainly active between the second half of the 1960s and the 1970s.

== Life and career ==
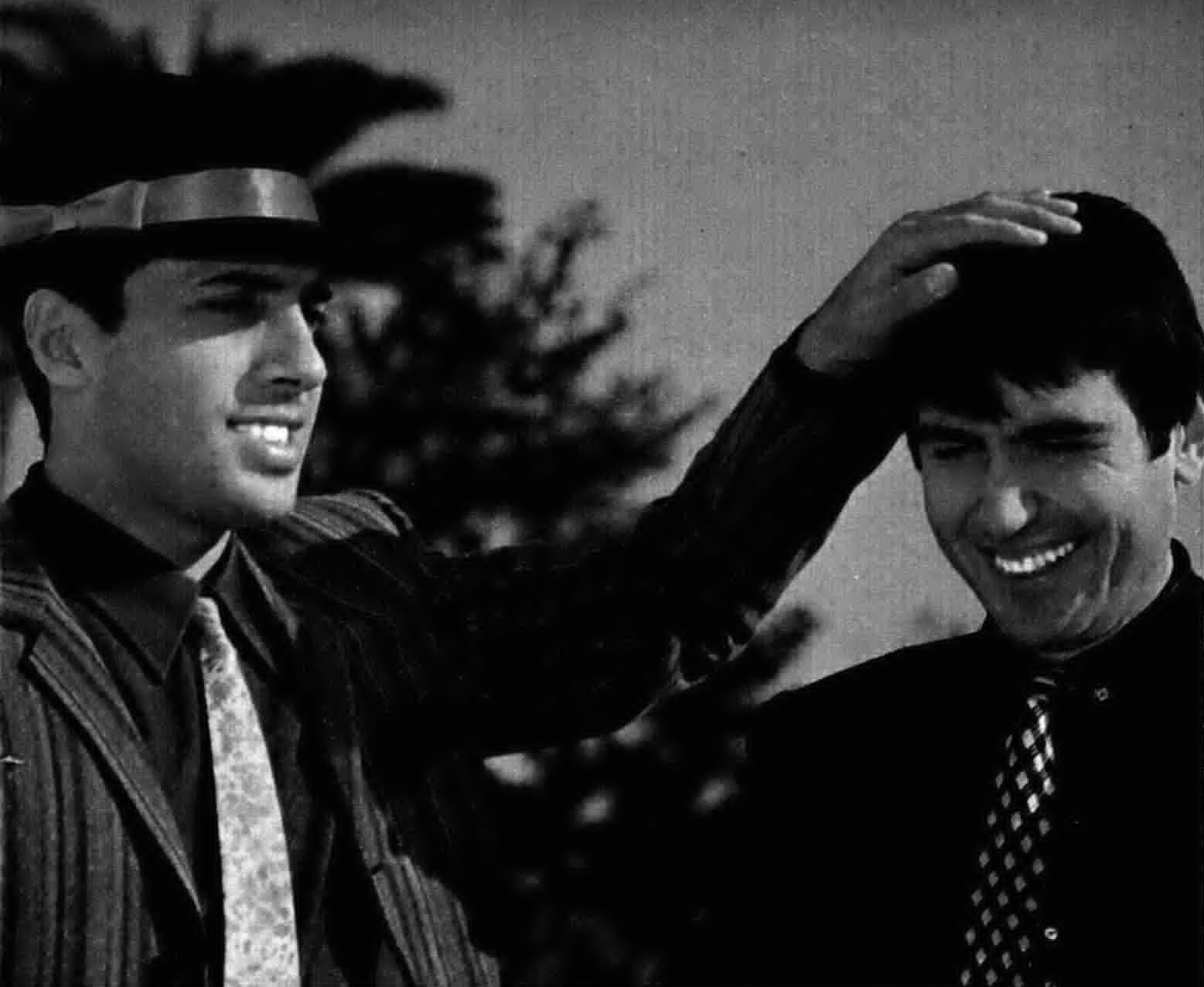
Pilat (right) with Adriano Celentano in 1968

Born in Trieste, Pilat started his career performing in clubs of his hometown. In 1963 he entered the Clan Celentano label, making his record debut with "Ciao ragazzi ciao". In the following years he entered the Festivalbar and took part in the Sanremo Music Festival three times, in 1966 as part of the supergroup "Trio del Clan" together with Gino Santercole and Ico Cerutti with "Il ragazzo della via Gluck", in 1968 with "Il re d'Inghilterra" and in 1975 with "Madonna d'amore". His main hits were "Shenandoah" (a cover of traditional song "The Legend of Shenandoah") and "La legge del menga". In the 1970s Pilat focused his activities on composing song for other artists, often collaborating with Daniele Pace and Mario Panzeri; among the best known songs he penned, were Tom Jones' "Love Me Tonight", Adriano Celentano's "L'attore", Gigliola Cinquetti's "Sì" and "Alle porte del sole", Gianni Nazzaro's "Quanto è bella lei" and Orietta Berti's "Non illuderti mai" and "Fin che la barca va". As a singer, starting from the 1970s he specialized in revisiting traditional Triestine songs.

== Discography ==
Album

- 1973: Trieste matta (CBS, 65477)
- 1975: La mula (CBS)
- 1978: Io, Trieste (Poor Cow, LTS 040)
- 1981: Trieste mia (CGD)
- 2000: Ghost (Poor Cow)
- 2000: Pilade (DV More Record)
- 2000: Riccio di mare (Ed. Digital sound)
- 2002: La cavala zelante - Canzoni triestine n. 1 (Poor Cow)
- 2002: Torno a Trieste - Canzoni triestine n. 2 (Poor Cow)
- 2002: Trieste piena de mar - Canzoni triestine n. 3 (Poor Cow)
- 2002: Viva la bora - Canzoni triestine n. 4 (Poor Cow)
- 2005: Cuore da bambino (Poor Cow)
- 2006: Come te pol dimenticarte de Trieste - Canzoni triestine n. 5 (Poor Cow)
- 2006: Sussurrando melodie d'amore (Poor Cow)
- 2006: C'era una volta il Clan (Green/Duck Record)
- 2007: Canto le mie canzoni...! (Poor Cow)
- 2007: I famosi del Clan (Poor Cow)
- 2011: Voio far el sindaco (Poor Cow)
