= Gigliola Cinquetti =

Italian singer and TV presenter (born 1947)

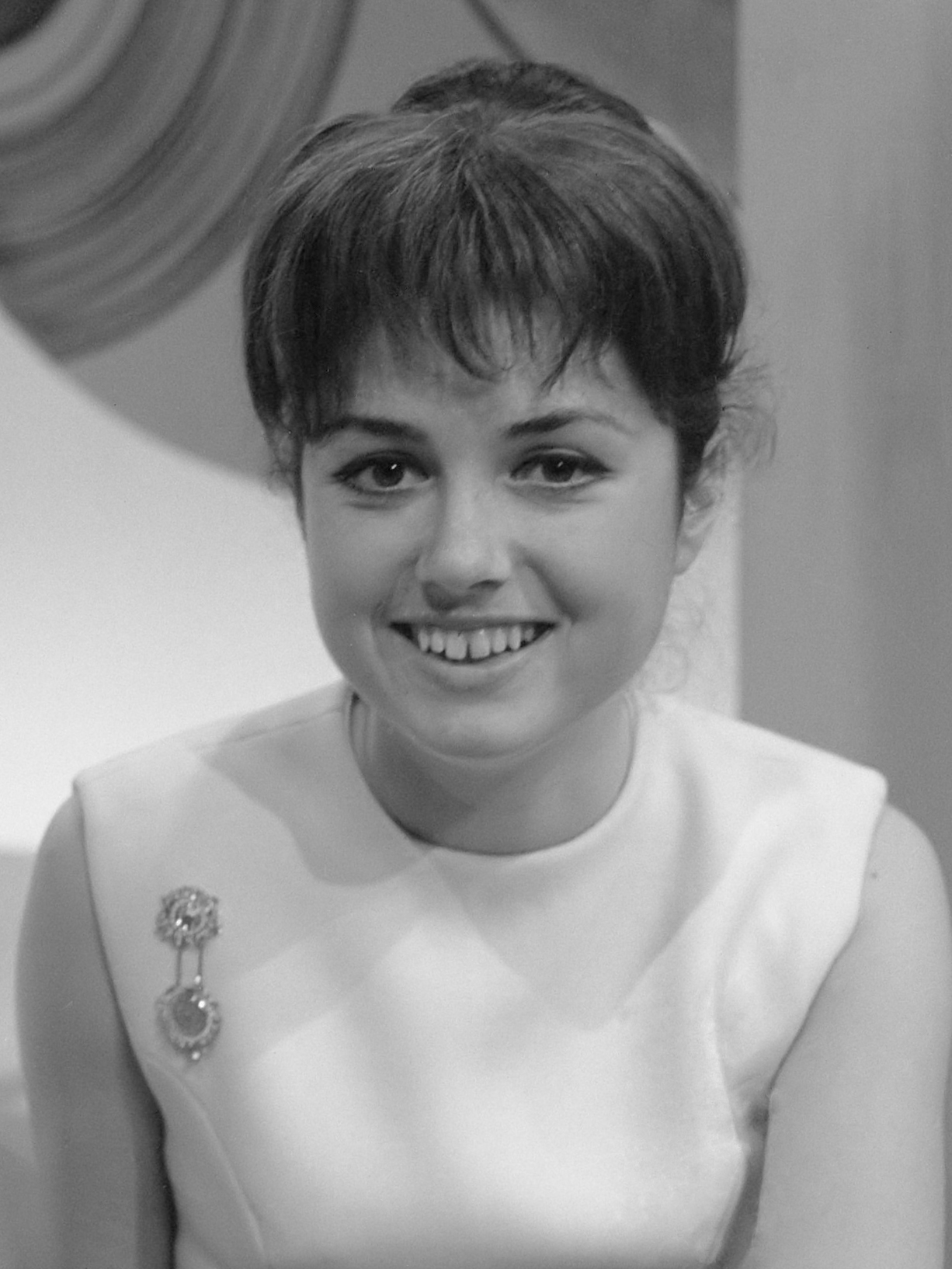
- Cinquetti in 1966

Background information
- Born: Gigliola Cinquetti; 20 December 1947 (age 78); Verona, Italy
- Occupations: Singer; songwriter; television personality
- Years active: 1963–present
- Spouse: Luciano Teodori (m. 1979)

Gigliola Cinquetti (Italian pronunciation: [dʒiʎˈʎɔːla tʃiŋˈkwetti]; born Giliola Cinquetti, 20 December 1947) is an Italian singer, songwriter and television presenter.

== Early and personal life ==
Gigliola Cinquetti was born to wealthy parents Luigi and Sara in Verona, Italy. She has a sister named Rosabianca. From the ages of 9 to 13, she studied and took piano lessons, taking exams in music theory. She loves painting and art, and graduated from the Salerno art school, also obtaining the qualification to teach.

Cinquetti married Luciano Teodori in 1979, and they have two children together – Giovanni and Costantino.

== Career ==
Cinquetti, pictured during the Eurovision Song Contest 1964 at the Tivoli Concert Hall

At the age of 16, she debuted at and won the Sanremo Music Festival 1964 singing "Non ho l'età" ("I'm not old enough"), with music composed by Mario Panzeri and lyrics by Nicola Salerno. Her win enabled her to represent Italy in the Eurovision Song Contest 1964 in Copenhagen, Denmark, with the same song, where she claimed her country's first ever victory in the event. Cinquetti became the youngest winner of the contest that far, aged 16 years and 92 days, beaten only by 13-year-old Sandra Kim in 1986.

The song became an international success, even spending 17 weeks in the UK singles chart and ending the year as the 88th best-selling single in the U.K. in 1964, something highly unusual for Italian-language material. It sold over three million copies, and was awarded a platinum disc in August 1964. In 1966, she recorded "Dio, come ti amo" ("God, How I Love You"), which became another international hit.

One of her other songs, "Alle porte del sole" (released in 1973), was re-recorded in both English (as "To the Door of the Sun") and Italian by Al Martino, two years after its initial release; "To the Door of the Sun" reached No. 17 on Billboard's Hot 100 in the United States. Cinquetti's own English version of the song was released as a single by CBS Records in August 1974, with her original 1973 Italian version on the B-side.

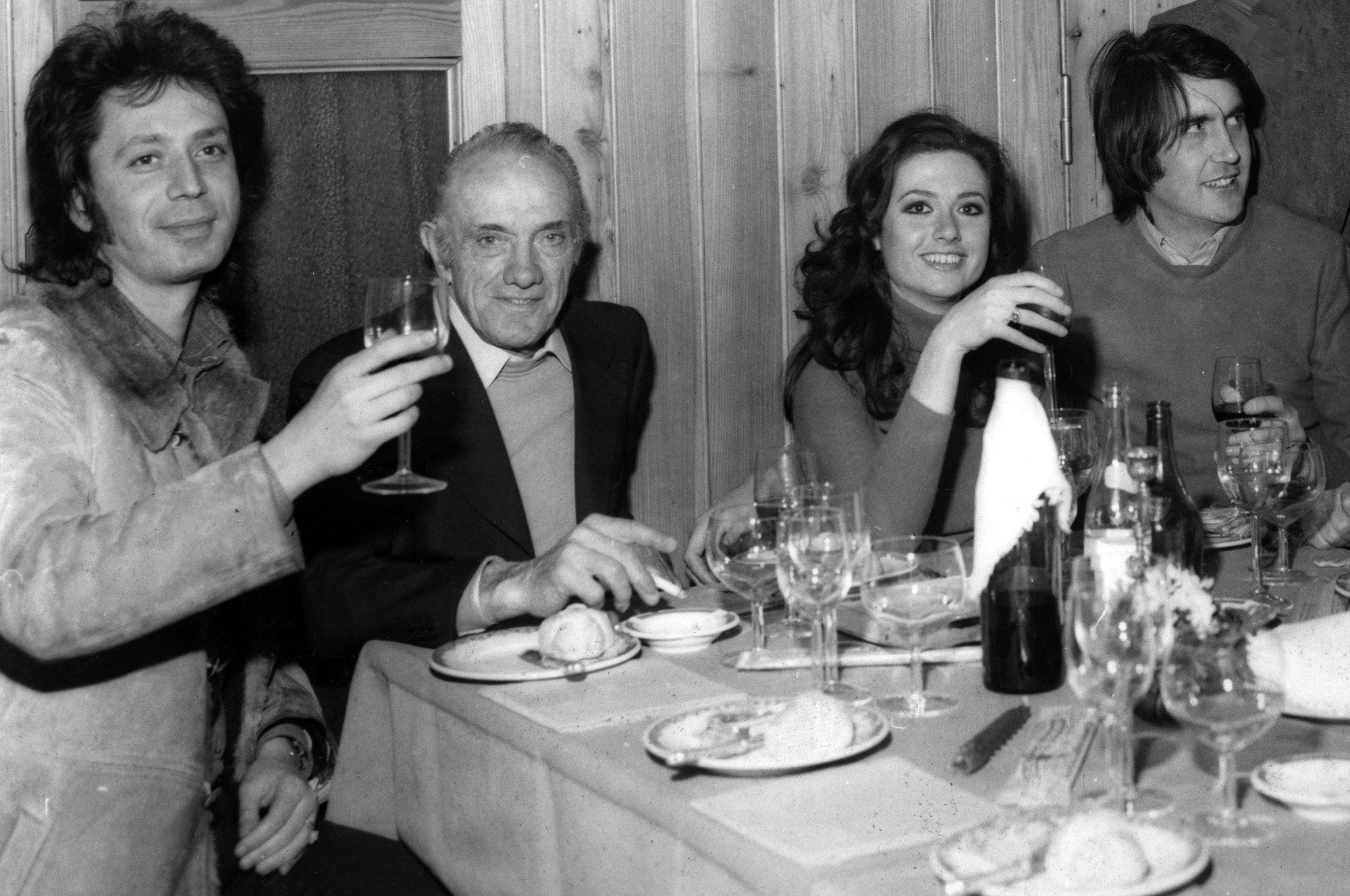
Cinquetti with (L–R) Daniele Pace, Mario Panzeri and Lorenzo Pilat, 1970s

Cinquetti returned to the Eurovision Song Contest 1974, held in Brighton, UK, where she again represented Italy. Performing the song "Sì" ("Yes"), the music and lyrics of which were written by Mario Panzeri, Daniele Pace, Lorenzo Pilat and Carrado Conti, she came second with 18 points after "Waterloo", sung by Sweden's ABBA, who won with 24 points. The live telecast of her song was banned in her home country by the Italian national broadcaster RAI, as the event partially coincided with the campaigning for the 1974 Italian divorce referendum which was to be held a month later in May. RAI censored the song because of concerns that the name and lyrics of the song (which constantly repeated the word 'Sì') could be accused of being a subliminal message and a form of propaganda to influence the Italian voting public to vote 'Yes' in the referendum. The song remained censored on most Italian state TV and radio stations for over a month. Cinquetti later recorded versions of the song in English ("Go (Before You Break My Heart)"), French ("Lui"), German ("Ja") and Spanish ("Sí"). The English-language version reached number 8 in the UK singles chart in June 1974.

In the 1990s, Cinquetti became a professional journalist and TV presenter and among others she hosted the current affairs programme Italia Rai on RAI International. She later co-hosted the Eurovision Song Contest 1991 with Toto Cutugno, who had brought the event to Italy with his victory in Zagreb the previous year – the country's first win in the contest since her own twenty-six years earlier.

In 2008, Cinquetti received an award as a tribute to her career in Italy and around the world. She published an autobiography in 2014.

Cinquetti returned to the Eurovision stage to perform "Non ho l'età" as an interval act during the final of the 2022 contest in Turin.

== Sanremo participations ==
Gigliola Cinquetti competed at the Sanremo Music Festival on twelve occasions, namely:

- 1964: "Non ho l'età (per amarti)" – with Patricia Carli – 1st
- 1965: "Ho bisogno di vederti" – with Connie Francis – Finalist
- 1966: "Dio, come ti amo" – with Domenico Modugno – 1st
- 1968: "Sera" – with Giuliana Valci – 8th
- 1969: "La pioggia" – with France Gall – 6th
- 1970: "Romantico blues" – with Bobby Solo – 6th
- 1971: "Rose nel buio" – with Ray Conniff – 9th
- 1972: "Gira l'amore (Caro bebè)" – 9th
- 1973: "Mistero" – Eliminated
- 1985: "Chiamalo amore" – 3rd
- 1989: "Ciao" – 18th
- 1995: "Giovane vecchio cuore" – 14th

== Discography ==
=== Studio albums ===
- Gigliola Cinquetti (1964)
- La rosa nera (1967)
- Gigliola per i più piccini (1967)
- L'orage (1969)
- Il treno dell'amore (1969)
- Cantando con gli amici (1971)
- ... E io le canto così (1972)
- Fidèlement votre... (1972)
- Su e giù per le montagne (1972)
- Stasera ballo liscio (1973)
- Bonjour Paris (1974)
- Auf der Strasse der Sonne (1974)
- Go (Before You Break My Heart) (1974)
- Gigliola e la banda (1975)
- Pensieri di donna (1978)
- Il portoballo (1982)
- Tuttintorno (1991)
- Giovane vecchio cuore (1995)
- I successi (1999)
- 20.12 (2016)

=== Charting singles ===
Year	Single	Peak chart positions												
Year	Single	IT	BE (FLA)	BE (WA)	FRA	GER	IRE	JAP	NL	NOR	QUE	SA	SPA	UK
1964	"Non ho l'età"	1	1	1	1	3	4	—	2	3	—	4	—	17
1964	"No tengo edad para amarte" (Spain-only release) (Note: "No tengo edad para amarte" is the Spanish-language version of "Non ho l'età".)	—	—	—	—	—	—	—	—	—	—	—	1	—
1964	"Il primo bacio che darò"	11	16	27	—	—	—	—	—	—	—	—	—	—
1964	"El primer beso" (Spain-only release) (Note: "El primer beso" is the Spanish-language version of "Il primo bacio che darò".)	—	—	—	—	—	—	—	—	—	—	—	4	—
1964	"Oh warum" (Germany-only release)	—	—	—	—	31	—	—	—	—	—	—	—	—
1965	"Ho bisogno di vederti"	7	—	—	—	—	—	—	—	—	—	—	—	—
1966	"Dio come ti amo"	5	—	—	—	—	—	—	—	—	—	—	5	—
1967	"La rosa nera"	5	—	—	—	—	—	—	—	—	—	—	—	—
1968	"Sera"	9	—	—	—	—	—	—	—	—	—	—	—	—
1968	"Giuseppe in Pennsylvania"	17	—	—	—	—	—	—	—	—	—	—	—	—
1968	"Quelli erano giorni"	6	—	—	—	—	—	—	—	—	—	—	—	—
1969	"La pioggia"	2	—	7	5	—	—	6	—	—	—	—	—	—
1969	"L'orage" (Note: "L'orage" is the French-language version of "La pioggia".)	—	—	7	4	—	—	—	—	—	—	—	—	—
1969	"Il treno dell'amore"	25	—	—	—	—	—	—	—	—	—	—	—	—
1969	"Hello Nadine"	—	—	—	—	—	—	—	—	—	—	—	—	—
1969	"La pioggia" (Japanese version; Japan-only release)	—	—	—	—	—	—	61	—	—	—	—	—	—
1969	"La lluvia" (Spain-only release) (Note: "La lluvia" is the Spanish-language version of "La pioggia")	—	—	—	—	—	—	—	—	—	—	—	24	—
1969	"Come una foglia" (Japan-only release)	—	—	—	—	—	—	94	—	—	—	—	—	—
1970	"Romantico blues"	14	—	—	—	—	—	—	—	—	—	—	—	—
1970	"Volano le rondini"	—	—	—	—	—	—	14	—	—	—	—	—	—
1971	"La domenica andando alla messa"	25	—	—	—	—	—	—	—	—	—	—	—	—
1971	"Le bateau-mouche" (Canada and France-only release)	—	—	48	78	—	—	—	—	—	—	—	—	—
1971	"Rose nel buio"	9	—	—	—	—	—	32	—	—	—	—	—	—
1971	"Amarti e poi morire"	18	—	—	—	—	—	—	—	—	—	—	—	—
1971	"Qui comando io"	13	—	—	—	—	—	—	—	—	—	—	—	—
1972	"Gira l'amore"	10	—	—	—	—	—	90	—	—	—	—	—	—
1972	"Un coin de terre, un olivier" (France-only release)	—	—	—	37	—	—	—	—	—	—	—	—	—
1973	"El domingo yendo a misa" (Spain-only release) (Note: "El domingo yendo a misa" is the Spanish-language version of "La domenica andando alla messa".)	—	—	—	—	—	—	—	—	—	—	—	19	—
1973	"Tango delle capinere"	15	—	—	—	—	—	—	—	—	—	—	—	—
1973	"La spagnola"	20	—	—	—	—	—	—	—	—	—	—	—	—
1974	"Alle porte del sole"	1	—	49	—	—	—	—	—	—	—	—	—	—
1974	"Dernière histoire, premier amour" (France and Belgium-only release) (Note: "Dernière histoire, premier amour" is the French-language version of "Alle porte del sole".)	—	—	49	—	—	—	—	—	—	—	—	—	—
1974	"Si"	17	30	6	—	13	—	—	—	—	—	—	—	—
1974	"Lui" (France and Belgium-only release) (Note: "Lui" is the French-language version of "Si".)	—	—	6	—	—	—	—	—	—	—	—	—	—
1974	"A las puerto del cielo" (Spain-only release) (Note: "A las puerto del cielo" is the Spanish-language version of "Alle porte del sole")	—	—	—	—	—	—	—	—	—	—	—	15	—
1974	"Go (Before You Break My Heart)" (Note: "Go (Before You Break My Heart)" is the English-language version of "Sì".)	—	—	—	—	—	6	—	—	—	—	—	—	8
1974	"Ja" (Germany-only release) (Note: "Ja" is the German-language version of "Si".)	—	—	—	—	45	—	—	—	—	—	—	—	—
1974	"The Door of the Sun" (Note: "The Door of the Sun" is the English-language version of "Alle porte del sole".)	—	—	—	—	—	—	—	—	—	—	6	—	—
1976	"La primavera" (France and Portugal-only release)	—	—	17	60	—	—	—	—	—	—	—	—	—
1976	"Comment fait-elle, dis-moi?" b/w "La Joconde" (Canada-only release)	—	—	—	—	—	—	—	—	—	10; 8	—	—	—
1985	"Chiamalo amore"	14	—	—	—	—	—	—	—	—	—	—	—	—
1986	"Una donna distante"	48	—	—	—	—	—	—	—	—	—	—	—	—
"—" denotes releases that did not chart or were not released in that territory.

== Filmography ==
=== Films ===
Year	Title	Role	Notes
1964	Canzoni, bulli e pupe	Herself	Cameo appearance
1965	008: Operazione ritmo	Gigliola	
1965	Questi pazzi, pazzi italiani	Gigliola	
1966	Blockhead	Angelina	
1966	Dio, come ti amo!	Gigliola de Francesco	
1968	Il professor Matusa e i suoi hippies	Herself	Cameo appearance
2001	The Knights of the Quest	Superior Mother	

=== Television ===
Year	Title	Role	Notes
1965	Ciao Italia	Singer	Television film
1966	Io, Gigliola	Herself/performer	Special
1968	Le mie prigioni	Zanze	Miniseries (4 episodes)
1968	Addio giovinezza!	Dorina	Television film
1972	Il bivio	Lalla	Miniseries (2 episodes)
1977	L'amico della notte	Herself/presenter	Musical program
1981–1982	Linea verde	Herself/co-host	Tourism program (season 1)
1981, 1986	Castrocaro Music Festival	Herself/presenter	Annual music festival
1987	Unomattina	Herself/reporter	Talk show (season 2)
1988–1989	Via Telauda 66	Herself/regular guest	Variety show
1991	Eurovision Song Contest	Herself/presenter	Annual music festival
1991–1992	Festa di compleanno	Herself/presenter	Variety show
1995	Napoli prima e dopo	Herself/presenter	Special
1999–2002	Commesse	Clara Massimi	Main role (12 episodes)
2011	Attenti a quei due – La sfida	Herself/judge	Variety show (season 2)
2012	Tale e quale show	Herself/contestant	Talent show (season 2)
2022	Eurovision Song Contest	Herself/singer (performing her winning song from 1964)	Annual music festival
2025	Ora o mai più	Herself/coach	Talent show (season 3)

== See also ==
- Bésame Mucho
- Sanremo Music Festival
- Eurovision Song Contest
- Italy in the Eurovision Song Contest
- Eurovision Song Contest 1974
- Sì (song)
- List of Eurovision Song Contest presenters

== Notes ==
Awards and achievements
Preceded by (Denmark) Grethe and Jørgen Ingmann with "Dansevise"	Winner of the Eurovision Song Contest; 1964	Succeeded by (Luxembourg) France Gall with "Poupée de cire, poupée de son"
Preceded by Emilio Pericoli with "Uno per tutte	Italy in the Eurovision Song Contest; 1964	Succeeded by Bobby Solo with "Se piangi, se ridi"
Preceded by Massimo Ranieri with "Chi sarà con te"	Italy in the Eurovision Song Contest; 1974	Succeeded by Wess and Dori Ghezzi with "Era"
Preceded by (Socialist Federal Republic of Yugoslavia) Helga Vlahović and Oliver Mlakar	Eurovision Song Contest presenter (with Toto Cutugno); 1991	Succeeded by (Sweden) Lydia Capolicchio and Harald Treutiger
