= Minnie Minoprio =

British-Italian actress, singer and showgirl (born in 1942)

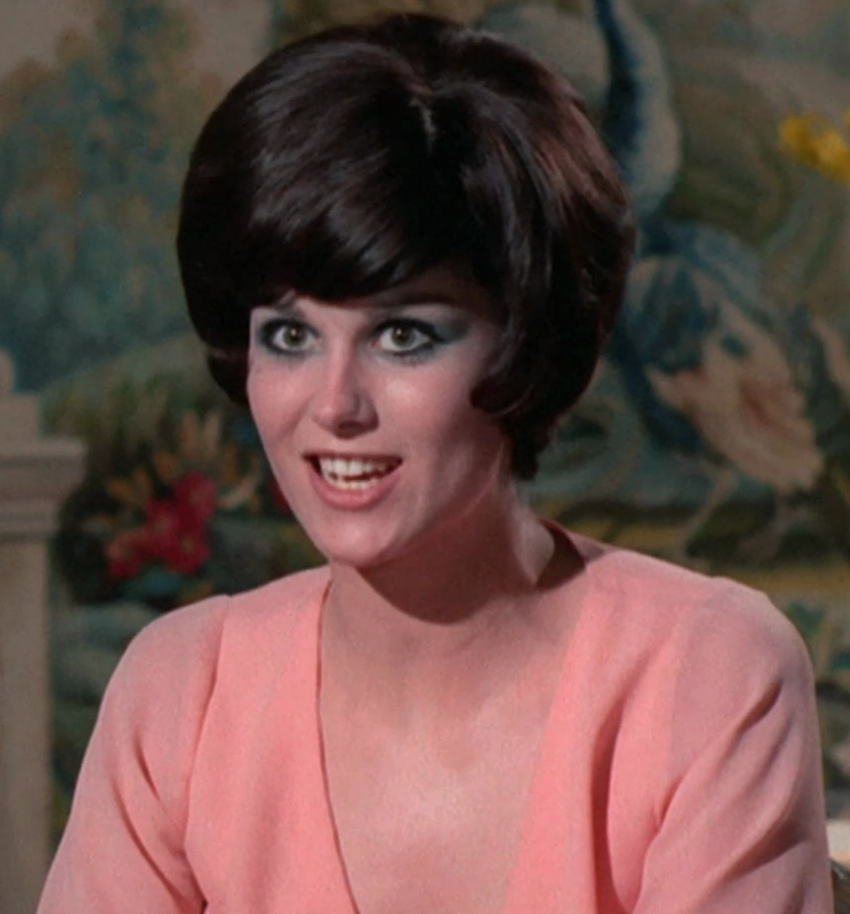
- Minoprio in the movie Zingara (1969)
- Born: 4 July 1942 (age 82); Ware, Hertfordshire, UK
- Occupations: Singer; actress

Minnie Minoprio (born 4 July 1942) is a British actress, singer and showgirl, mainly active in Italy.

== Life and career ==
Born Virginia Anne Minoprio in Ware, Hertfordshire, Minoprio after graduating from the Arts Educational School, where she studied acting and singing, debuted at 15 in a stage version of "Cinderella". Two years later moved in Italy where she starred in the revue Io e Margherita, alongside Walter Chiari.

At the same time she began a career as a jazz singer, recording a music album of dixieland and collaborating with other musicians; just with a duet with another singer, Fred Bongusto, she obtained in 1971 her major discographic success, the song "Quando mi dici così", which ranked 20 in the Italian hit parade. Her variegated career also includes radio, television, cinema and two novels, Il passaggio (1992) and Benvenuti a bordo (2007).

== Discography ==
- 1969 - New! Dixieland Sound (Contape)
- 1973 - Forse Sarà La Musica Del Mare (Fonit Cetra, LPX-30)
- 1974 - Ti voglio dare... poco per volta (Spark, SRLP261)
- 1983 - Minnie (Hollywood, HO 82702)
- 1987 - Anni '40... le canzoni più belle (CGD, 20569)
- 1993 - Good Friends (Rossodisera Records)
- 2003 - Jazz (Hollywood)
- 2005 - My twilight songs (Hollywood)
- 2007 - S(w)inging the blues - Minnie Minoprio quartet & guests (Hollywood)
- 2007 - Jason Marsalis & Minnie Minoprio (Hollywood)
- 2009 - Why stop now! (Great songs from the 20th century) (NAR International, distr. Edel)

== Partial filmography ==
- Zingara (1969) - Silvia Donati
- Mio padre Monsignore (1971) - Lover of Don Alvaro
- Roma Bene (1971) - Minnie
- The Funny Face of the Godfather (1973) - Bonnie
- Una storia ambigua (1986) - Contessa Anna Guerrieri
- Forever Blues (2005) - Singer
