= Jesamine =

Single by The Casuals
- B-side: "I've Got Something Too"
- Released: May 1968
- Genre: Pop; bubblegum
- Length: 3:30
- Label: Decca
- Songwriters: Frere Manston, Jack Gellar

"Jesamine" is a song written by Marty Wilde and Ronnie Scott, published under the pseudonyms Frere Manston and Jack Gellar. Initially recorded by Welsh band the Bystanders as "When Jezamine Goes", the version by English band the Casuals became a hit when it was released as a single in May 1968 . It reached number two on the UK Singles Chart in October 1968.

== Background ==
Marty Wilde and Ronnie Scott wrote "Jesamine" in January 1968. Scott initially conceived "when Rosemary goes" as the first line of the chorus; Wilde suggested the name be changed to Jesamine, the name of a cafe in Huyton, Merseyside, where his mother-in-law lived. The songwriters used the pseudonyms of Frere Manston and Jack Gellar. Wilde, who had been a teen idol, was keen to "know what reaction there was to the song" before disclosing his identity.

The song was originally recorded by the Bystanders, a band managed by Scott, and released under the title "When Jezamine Goes" on Pye Records. The song, however, failed to make any impact on the chart. The song was then recorded by the Casuals based largely on the Bystanders' arrangement, and released as "Jesamine". This version was successful in many countries; in the UK it reached number two, kept off the number one spot by Mary Hopkin's "Those Were The Days". A recording by Wilde appears on his album Diversions (1969).

== Reception ==
Paul Weller has described "Jesamine" as one of his favourite records. It was one of the songs in his record collection that he discussed on the 8 February 1998 BBC Radio One edition of All Back to Mine, describing it as "a beautiful record", that he loved the melody, and found it "sad", "nostalgic" but "really inspiring". He included it in the 2003 compilation of songs that influenced him, Under the Influence.

Robin Carmody of Freaky Trigger praised the song's "charming, sun-kissed flight" and grouped it among other early British bubblegum pop songs, like the Love Affair's "Everlasting Love" (1967) and the Tremeloes' "Suddenly You Love Me" (1968) for their emerging sense of optimism, "not in a cloying or false way, but appealingly (and unreachably) pre-ironic."

In 1969, "Jesamine" received the Ivor Novello Award for Most Romantic Song of the Year.

== Charts ==
Chart (1968–69)	Peak position
Australia (Go-Set)	21
Belgium (Ultratop 50 Flanders)	5
Belgium (Ultratop 50 Wallonia)	28
France	62
Ireland (IRMA)	3
Netherlands (Single Top 100)	8
New Zealand (Listener Chart)	1
Norway (VG-lista)	6
UK Singles (Official Charts)	2
West Germany (GfK)	9
