= Zingara (film) =

- Directed by: Mariano Laurenti
- Written by: Roberto Gianviti; Dino Verde
- Starring: Bobby Solo; Loretta Goggi; Pippo Franco; Mario Pisu; Pino Ferrara; Minnie Minoprio; Alicia Brandet; Claudio Gora
- Cinematography: Tino Santoni
- Music by: Willy Brezza
- Distributed by: Variety Distribution
- Release date: 1969
- Language: Italian

Zingara (Italian for Gypsy woman) is a 1969 Italian musical comedy film directed by Mariano Laurenti. It is named after the Bobby Solo's hit song "Zingara".

== Cast ==
- Bobby Solo: Franco Sarresi
- Loretta Goggi: Marisa
- Pippo Franco: Orazio
- Minnie Minoprio: Silvia
- Gigi Reder: Director of the restaurant
- Claudio Gora: Camillo Ricci
- Pino Ferrara: Augusto Ricci
- Mario Pisu: Marisa and Silvia's father
- Linda Sini: Marisa and Silvia's mother
- Umberto D'Orsi: Comm. Pergiovanni
- Nanda Primavera: Pergiovanni's wife
- Dada Gallotti: Pergiovanni's lover
- Alicia Brandet: Elizabeth McDonald
- Fabio Testi: "The Chinese"
- Ignazio Leone
