= Forever Blues =

- Directed by: Franco Nero
- Starring: Franco Nero
- Cinematography: Giovanni Cavallini
- Music by: Lino Patruno
- Release date: 2005
- Language: Italian

Forever Blues is a 2005 Italian drama film written, directed and starred by Franco Nero, at his debut as director. It is loosely based on the drama with the same name by Enrico Bernard. At the time of its release the film was openly praised by Italian first lady Franca Ciampi, wife of President of the Italian Republic Carlo Azeglio Ciampi, that defined the film as "educational, emotional, bright and poetic".

== Cast ==
- Daniele Piamonti: Marco
- Franco Nero: Luca
- Valentina Mezzacappa: Marco's lover
- Robert Madison: Marco adult
- Minnie Minoprio: the singer

== Reception ==
=== Critical response ===
Forever Blues garnered a mixed to negative reception from critics. Giancarlo Zappoli, writing for Mymovies.it, gave the film a 2 out of 5 stars review. Bruno Trigo, writing for Cinema4Stelle, gave the film a 1.5 out of 4 stars review.

=== Award ===
Franco Nero received a "Special Jury Award" for Forever Blues at the 2006 Globo d'oro.
