= Zingara (song) =

Single by Bobby Solo

from the album Il Meglio Di Bobby Solo
- B-side: "Piccola ragazza triste"
- Released: February 1969
- Genre: Pop
- Label: Ricordi
- Songwriters: Enrico Riccardi and Luigi Albertelli

Bobby Solo singles chronology
"Amore mi manchi" (1969)	"Zingara" (1969)	"Domenica d'agosto" (1969)

"Zingara" (Italian for Gypsy woman) is a song composed by Enrico Riccardi and Luigi Albertelli. The song won the nineteenth edition of the Sanremo Music Festival, with a double performance by Bobby Solo and Iva Zanicchi. The Solo's version peaked at first place for two weeks on the Italian hit parade.

The song also named a musicarello film with the same name, directed by Mariano Laurenti and starred by the same Bobby Solo and by Loretta Goggi.

== Connie Francis Version ==
Connie Francis, a former contestant in the Sanremo Music Festival herself, recorded the song with English lyrics and released it as a single in 1969 under MGM. It was her 3rd non-charting single of the decade, and after its lackluster performance in the markets, she decided not to renew her contract with MGM, when the records company was taken over by Polydor.

== Charts ==
=== Bobby Solo ===
Chart (1969)	Peak position
Argentina (CAPIF)	4
Brazil (IBOPE)	1
Italy (Musica e dischi)	1
Switzerland (Schweizer Hitparade)	7

== Track listing ==
=== Bobby Solo Version ===
7" single – SRL 10-527

1. "Zingara" (Enrico Riccardi, Luigi Albertelli)
2. "Piccola ragazza triste" (Cesare Gigli, Gianni Sanjust, Capuano, Bobby Solo)

=== Iva Zanicchi Version ===
7" single – REN NP 16327

1. "Zingara" (Enrico Riccardi, Luigi Albertelli)
2. "Io Sogno" (Salvatore Vinciguerra)
