= Nuccio Costa =

Italian television presenter

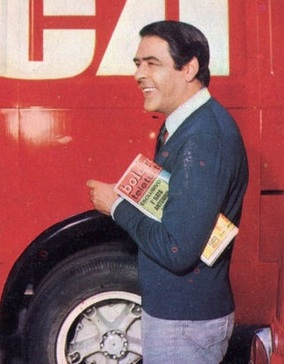
- Born: 4 October 1925; Catania
- Died: 27 February 1991 (aged 65); Catania
- Occupation: television presenter

Nuccio Costa (4 October 1925 – 27 February 1991) was an Italian television presenter.

== Life and career ==
Born in Catania, Costa began his artistic career at the end of the Second World War, when he hosted over two hundred stage shows for the Allied troops in Italy. He later became the artistic director of the Teatro Stabile di Catania and made several RAI radio shows in couple with Turi Ferro.

Costa hosted several successful TV programmes, including two editions of the Sanremo Music Festival and several editions of Cantagiro.

In 1977, he created the beauty contest "La donna del Mediterraneo".
