= Iva Zanicchi =

Italian singer & politician (born 1940)

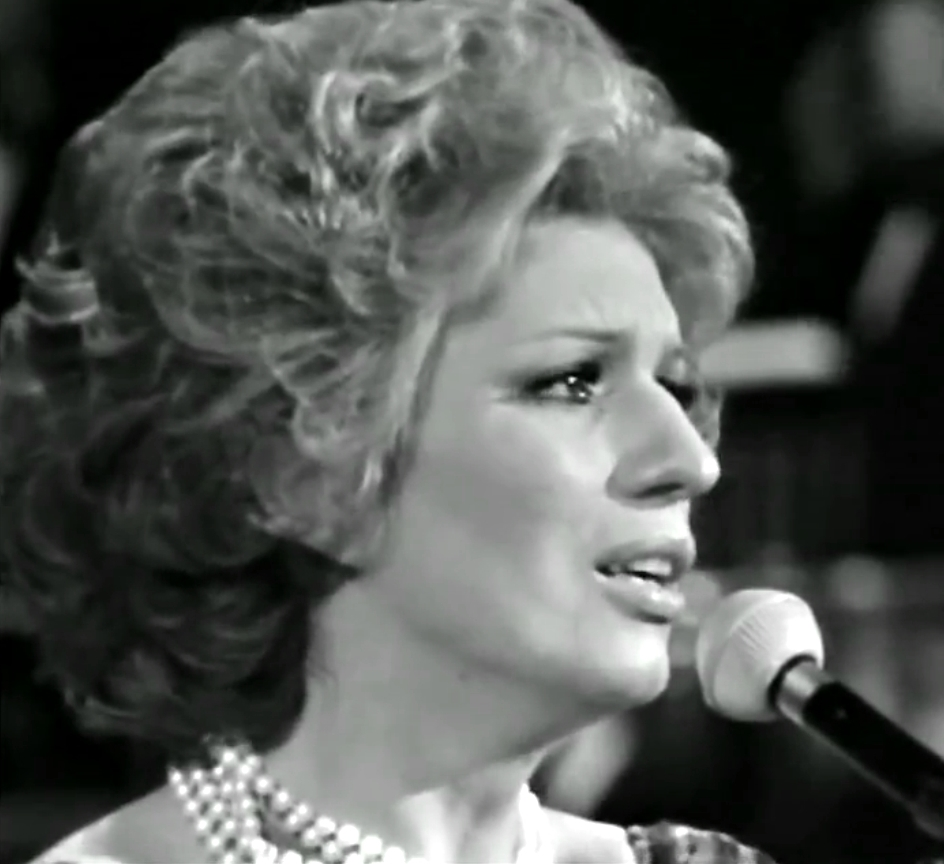
- Zanicchi in 1972

Background information
- Also known as: "The Eagle from Ligonchio"; "the Italian Dionne Warwick"
- Born: 18 January 1940 (age 86); Ligonchio, Emilia-Romagna, Kingdom of Italy
- Genres: Pop; blue-eyed soul
- Occupations: Singer; actress; television host; politician
- Years active: 1963–present
- Labels: Ri-Fi; Ricordi; Traccia; Sif; SGM; Five; Carosello; Sugar; Scepter
- Spouse: Antonio Ansoldi (m. 1967; div. 1985)
- Partner: Fausto Pinna (1987–2024; his death)
- Website: www.ivazanicchi.net
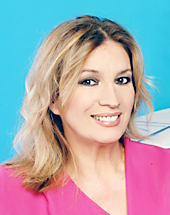
- Official portrait, 2008–2014

Member of European Parliament for Italy
- In office 2008–2014

Personal details
- Party: Forza Italia (1999–2009); The People of Freedom (2009–2013); Forza Italia (2013–2014)
- Other political affiliations: European People's Party (2004–2014)

Iva Zanicchi (Italian pronunciation: [ˈiːva ddzaˈnikki]; born 18 January 1940) is an Italian pop singer and politician. She has a mezzo-soprano voice and is nick-named by the press as the "Eagle from Ligonchio" (l'Aquila di Ligonchio).

== Biography ==
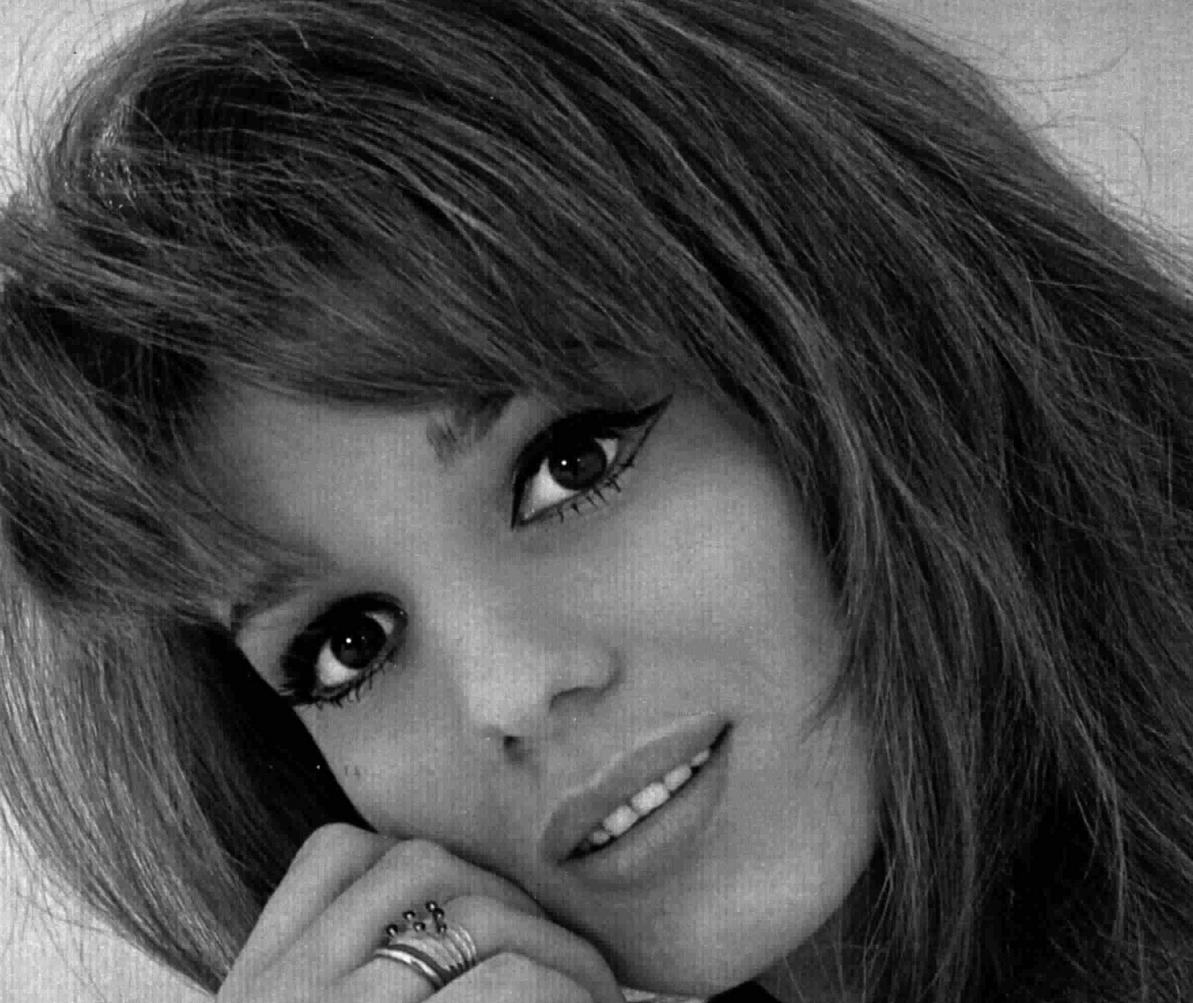
Zanicchi in 1965

Iva Zanicchi was born in Ligonchio, in the province of Reggio Emilia, to Zefiro Zanicchi (1909–2004) and Elsa Raffaelli (1914–2010). Her career began in 1962 at the Castrocaro Music Festival, where she earned third place. She won the Sanremo Music Festival in 1967 with "Non pensare a me", in 1969 with "Zingara" and again in 1974 with "Ciao cara, come stai?". Zanicchi remains the only woman singer to have won that festival's prize three times. In 1969, she represented Italy in the Eurovision Song Contest in Madrid with "Due grosse lacrime bianche", finishing 13th. She represented Italy in the V Festival Internacional da Canção in Rio with "Tu non-sei più innamorato di me" in 1970. A concert at the Paris Olympia and a tour (United States, Canada, South America and the Soviet Union) followed. Zanicchi later also toured Australia and Japan. Has worked with Mikis Theodorakis, Charles Aznavour and Luigi Tenco, and has made numerous recordings. Has performed at Madison Square Gardens, New York (1974) and the Teatro Regio (Parma). In total, Zanicchi released 14 albums during the 1970s, including a Christmas-themed, Neapolitan and Spanish language recordings.

From 1987 to 2000 Zanicchi hosted the television game show OK, il prezzo è giusto!, the Italian version of The Price Is Right, as the only female host in the history of the game show worldwide (since then, other countries have had versions of the show hosted by a woman).

In 2004 she was one of Forza Italia's candidates at the European Parliament elections, polling nearly 35,000 but not enough to be elected. However, as the highest-polling among the candidates failing to be elected, Zanicchi took up her seat in Strasburg in May 2008, representing Forza Italia, when EuroMP Mario Mantovani left to become a PdL senator. She was confirmed in her post at the European elections of June 2009.

== Personal life ==
Iva Zanicchi has one daughter. She considers herself Roman Catholic.

== Curiosities ==
In 2009, a band called I VazzaNikki was started, the name being a clear reference and tribute to Iva Zanicchi. The idea of the group came during a conversation between the Italian comedians Valerio Lundini, who is one of the singers and the keyboard player of the band, and Greg, who suggested the name. The objective was to play rock'n'roll and rockabilly music, inspired by the American 1950s. The band characterizes for ironic and nonsense songs, and even performed in the TV broadcast Una pezza di Lundini, hosted by Lundini on Rai Uno.

== Discography ==
=== Albums ===
- 1965: Iva Zanicchi
- 1967: Fra noi
- 1968: Unchained Melody
- 1970: Iva senza tempo
- 1970: Caro Theodorakis... Iva
- 1971: Caro Aznavour... Iva
- 1971: Caro Tenco... Iva
- 1971: Shalom
- 1972: Fantasia
- 1972: Dall'amore in poi
- 1973: Le giornate dell'amore
- 1974: Io ti propongo
- 1974; ¿Chao Iva cómo estás? (Spanish)
- 1975: Io sarò la tua idea
- 1976: Confessioni
- 1976: The Golden Orpheus '76 (live in Bulgaria)
- 1976: Cara Napoli
- 1978: Con la voglia di te
- 1978: Playboy
- 1980: D'Iva
- 1980: D'Iva (Spanish Version)
- 1981: Iva Zanicchi
- 1981: Nostalgias (Spanish)
- 1982: Yo, por amarte (Spanish)
- 1984: Quando arriverà
- 1984: Iva 85
- 1987: Care colleghe
- 1988: Nefertari
- 1991: Come mi vorrei
- 2003: Fossi un tango
- 2009: Colori d'amore
- 2013: In cerca di te
- 2022: Gargana

=== Singles (Italy) ===
- 1963: Zero in amore / Come un tramonto
- 1963: Tu dirai/Sei ore
- 1964: Come ti vorrei/La nostra spiaggia
- 1964: Credi/Resta sola come sei
- 1964: Come ti vorrei / Chi potrà amarti
- 1965: I tuoi anni più belli / Un altro giorno verrà
- 1965: Accarezzami amore / Mi cercherai
- 1965: Caro mio / Non tornar mai
- 1966: La notte dell'addio / Caldo è l'amore
- 1966: Fra noi / Goldsnake
- 1966: Ma pecché / Tu saje a verità
- 1966: Monete d’oro / Ci amiamo troppo
- 1967: Non pensare a me / Vita
- 1967: Quel momento / Dove è lui
- 1967: Le montagne (ci amiamo troppo) / Vivere non-vivere
- 1967: Dolcemente / Come stai bene e tu?
- 1968: Per vivere / Non accetterò
- 1968: Amore amor / Sleeping
- 1968: La felicità / Anche così
- 1968: La felicità / Ci vuole così poco
- 1968: Senza catene / Diverso dagli altri
- 1969: Zingara / Io sogno
- 1969: Due grosse lacrime bianche / Tienimi con te
- 1969: Un bacio sulla fronte / Accanto a te
- 1969: Che vuoi che sia / Perché mai
- 1969: Vivrò / Estasi d'amore
- 1970: L'arca di Noé / Aria di settembre
- 1970: Un uomo senza tempo / Un attimo
- 1970: Un fiume amaro / Il sogno é fumo
- 1970: Un fiume amaro / Tienimi con te
- 1970: Una storia di mezzanotte / Il bimbo e la gazzella
- 1971: La riva bianca e la riva nera / Tu non-sei più innamorato di me
- 1971: Coraggio e paura / Sciogli i cavalli al vento
- 1972: Ma che amore / Il mio bambino
- 1972: Nonostante lei / Non scordarti di me
- 1972: Alla mia gente / Dall'amore in poi
- 1972: La mia sera / Il sole splende ancora
- 1972: Mi ha stregato il viso tuo / A te
- 1973: I mulini della mente / Basterà
- 1973: Le giornate dell'amore / Chi mi manca é lui
- 1973: Fred Bongusto:White Christmas/ Natale dura un giorno
- 1974: L'indifferenza / Sarà domani
- 1974: Ciao cara come stai? / Vendetta
- 1974: Testarda io / Sei tornato a casa tua
- 1975: Testarda io / E la notte é qui
- 1975: Io sarò la tua idea / Jesus
- 1976: Mamma tutto / Dormi, amore dormi
- 1976: I discorsi tuoi / Confessioni
- 1977: Arrivederci padre / Che uomo sei
- 1977: Munasterio 'e Santa Chiara / 'O destino
- 1977: Mal d'amore / Selvaggio
- 1978: Con la voglia di te / Sei contento
- 1979: Per te / Pronto 113
- 1979: La valigia / Ditemi
- 1979: A parte il fatto / Capirai
- 1981: Ardente / E tu mai
- 1983: Aria di luna / Amico
- 1984: Chi (mi darà) / Comandante
- 1984: Quando arriverà / Sera di vento
- 1985: Da domani senza te / Aria di luna
- 1987: Volo / Uomini e no
- 2001: Ho bisogno di te
- 2009: Ti voglio senza amore
- 2020: Sangue Nero
- 2021: Amore mio malgrado
- 2021: Lacrime e buio
- 2022: Voglio amarti

== Sanremo Music Festival ==
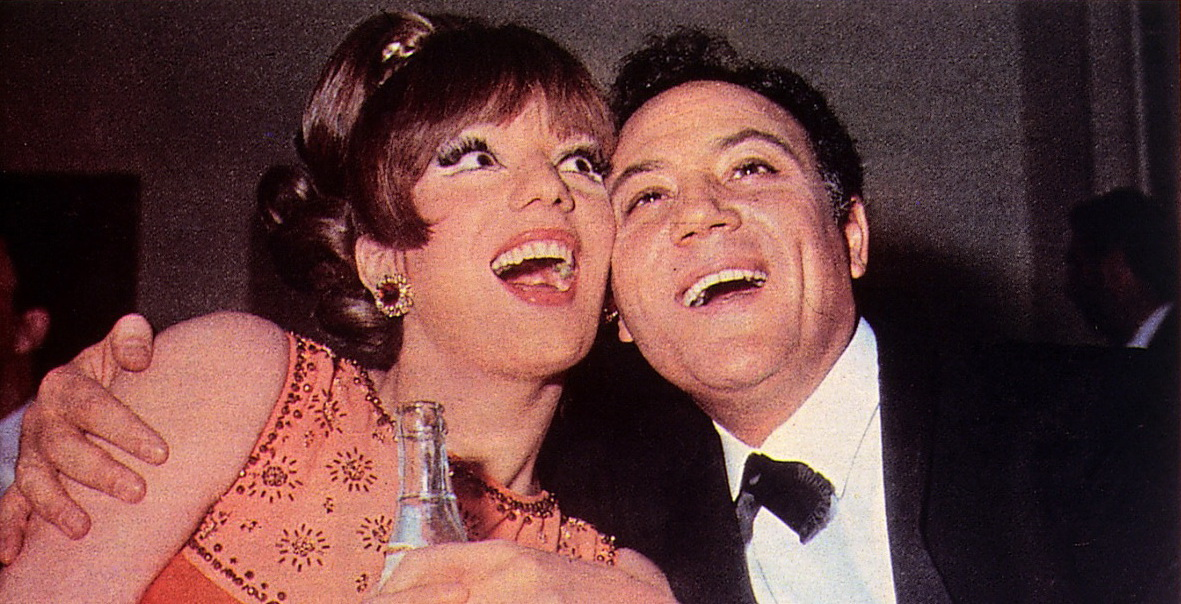
Zanicchi and Claudio Villa at Sanremo 1967

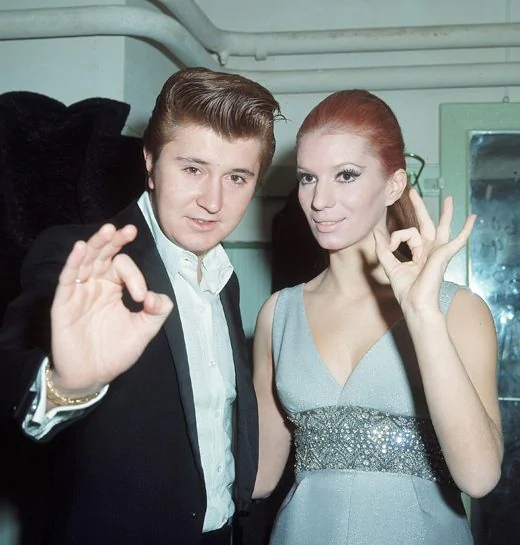
Zanicchi and Bobby Solo at Sanremo 1969

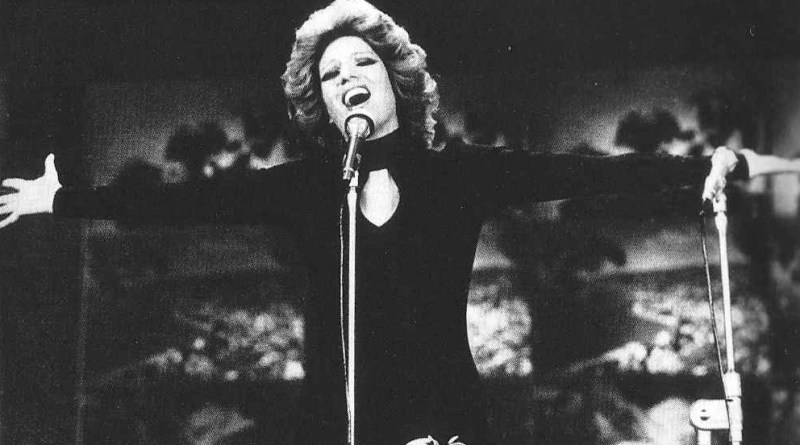
Zanicchi performing at Sanremo 1974

- 1965: "I tuoi anni più belli" (Mogol-Gaspari-Polito), coupled with Gene Pitney
- 1966: "La notte dell'addio" (Diverio-Testa), coupled with Vic Dana
- 1967: "Non pensare a me" (Testa-Sciorilli), coupled with Claudio Villa – winning song
- 1968: "Per vivere" (Nisa-Bindi), coupled with Udo Jürgens
- 1969: "Zingara" (Albertelli-Riccardi), coupled with Bobby Solo – winning song
- 1970: "L'arca di Noè" (Endrigo), coupled with Sergio Endrigo
- 1974: "Ciao cara come stai?" (Dinaro-Daiano-Janne-Malgioglio) – winning song
- 1984: "Chi (mi darà)" (Balsamo-Malgioglio-Balsamo)
- 2003: "Fossi un tango" (Lana-Donati)
- 2009: "Ti voglio senza amore"
- 2022: "Voglio amarti"

Zanicchi was handed a lifetime achievement award at the Sanremo Music Festival 2025.

== Bibliography ==
- 2001: Polenta di castagne
- 2005: I prati di Sara

== Filmography ==
Films
Year	Title	Role	Notes
1961	Le italiane e l'amore	Singer	Cameo appearance
1967	Una ragazza tutta d'oro	Iva Zanelli	Leading role
1967	28 minuti per 3 milioni di dollari	Club singer	Cameo appearance
1991	L'Odissea	Giunone	Leading role
1998	Kaputt Mundi	Gina Carucci	Supporting role
2019	W gli sposi	Maria	Leading role

Television
Year	Title	Role	Notes
2005–2010	Caterina e le sue figlie	Liliana	Italian TV Series; 13 episodes
2018	L'ispettore Coliandro	Ersilia Caran	Italian TV Series; episode: "Vai col liscio"

== Game show host ==
She hosted the Italian version of The Price Is Right, called "OK, il prezzo è giusto". She took over for Gigi Sabani in the 1986–87 season and was succeeded by Maria Teresa Ruta in 2000. When she took a brief absence from the show in 1999, Emanuela Folliero hosted in her place.
