= Bobby Solo =

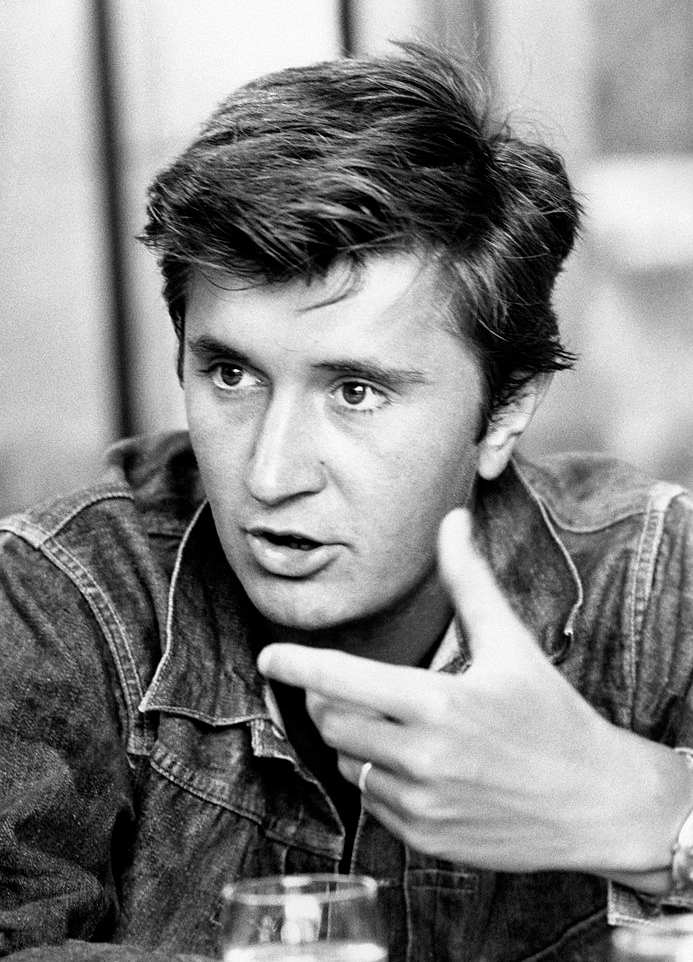
- Bobby Solo in 1970

Background information
- Born: Roberto Satti; 18 March 1945 (age 81); Rome, Kingdom of Italy
- Genres: Traditional pop
- Occupations: Singer-songwriter; musician
- Years active: (1960s–present)

Roberto Satti (born 18 March 1945), known professionally as Bobby Solo, is an Italian singer-songwriter and musician.

== Singing career ==
In 1964, Solo participated in the Sanremo Music Festival with the song "Una lacrima sul viso" ("A Tear on your Face", written by "Lunero"), but affected by laryngitis, he sang with playback, which disqualified him as that was contrary to the festival regulations. The song, however, became a global hit. It was the first record to sell over one million copies in Italy, and global sales exceeded three million. It was awarded a gold disc.

In the following year Solo won in the festival with the song "Se piangi, se ridi". He participated with the same song in the Eurovision Song Contest and finished in fifth place.

Again in 1969 Solo participated in the Sanremo Music Festival, with the song "Zingara", together with Iva Zanicchi. His last participation in the festival was in 2003 (together with Little Tony), singing "Non si cresce mai".

== Film career ==
Solo sang and played singing performers in several Italian, French and American films, including:

- Tears on Your Face (1964)
- Viale della canzone (1965)
- The Most Beautiful Couple in the World (1968)
- Zingara (1969)
- "FF.SS." – Cioè: "...che mi hai portato a fare sopra a Posillipo se non mi vuoi più bene?" (1983)

== Personal life ==
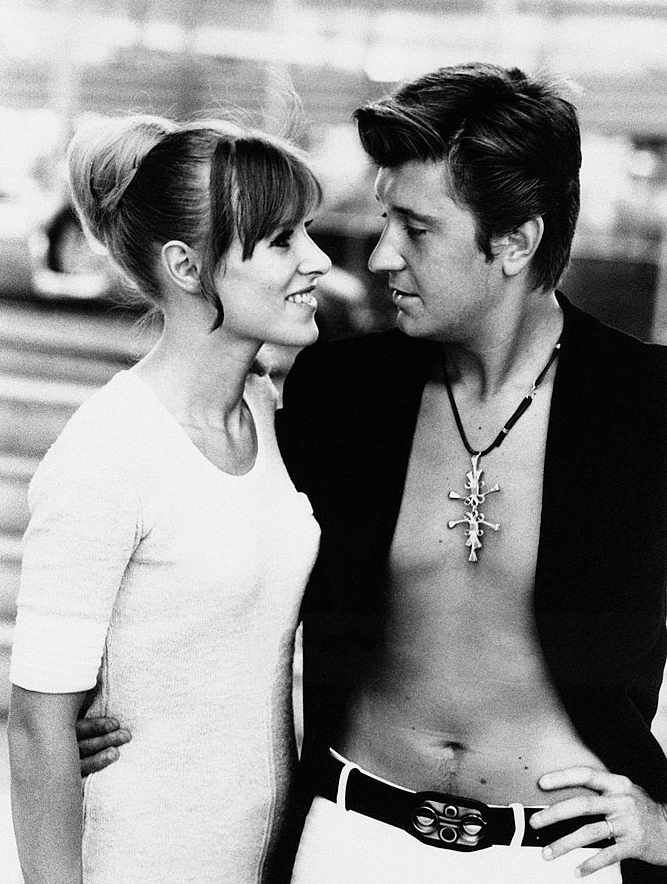
Bobby Solo with Sophie Teckel in 1970

Solo was born in Rome to an Istrian mother and Friulan father. In December 1967 he married Sophie Teckel, a French ballet dancer. They had three children, son Alain (b. 1968) and daughters Chantal (b. 1971) and Muriel (b. 1975). The couple divorced in 1991, after which Solo married Tracy Quade, a Korean-American hostess, and moved to the United States. Solo had a fourth child between the marriages.
