= Daniele Pace =

Italian composer, lyricist and singer-songwriter (1935–1985)

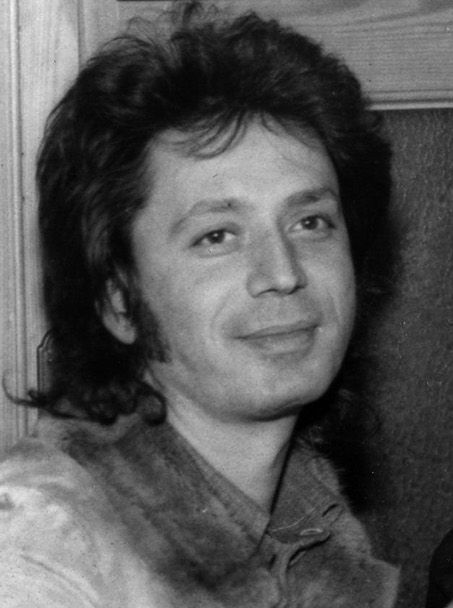
- Pace in the 1970s

Background information
- Born: 20 April 1935; Milan, Lombardy, Kingdom of Italy
- Died: 24 October 1985 (aged 50) Milan, Lombardy, Italy
- Occupations: Singer; songwriter
- Formerly of: Squallor

Daniele Pace (pronounced [daˈnjɛːle ˈpaːtʃe]; 20 April 1935 – 24 October 1985) was an Italian composer, lyricist and singer-songwriter.

== Life and career ==
Born in Milan, Pace started his career as lead vocalist of the group I Marcellini. After a brief solo career as a singer-songwriter, in the early 1960s he was enrolled by CGD as a composer and lyricist, often teaming with Mario Panzeri. The duo had several hits, and some of their songs were covered in other languages and became international successes. In 1971 he co-founded the comedy music group Squallor, and in 1979 he recorded a solo album, Vitamina C.

Pace's collaborations include Gigliola Cinquetti, France Gall, Caterina Caselli, Ricchi e Poveri, Loredana Bertè, Roberto Carlos, Orietta Berti, Mario Lavezzi, I Camaleonti, Eduardo De Crescenzo, Connie Francis and Massimo Ranieri. He died of a heart attack, aged 50.
