= Mario Panzeri =

Italian songwriter (1911–1991)

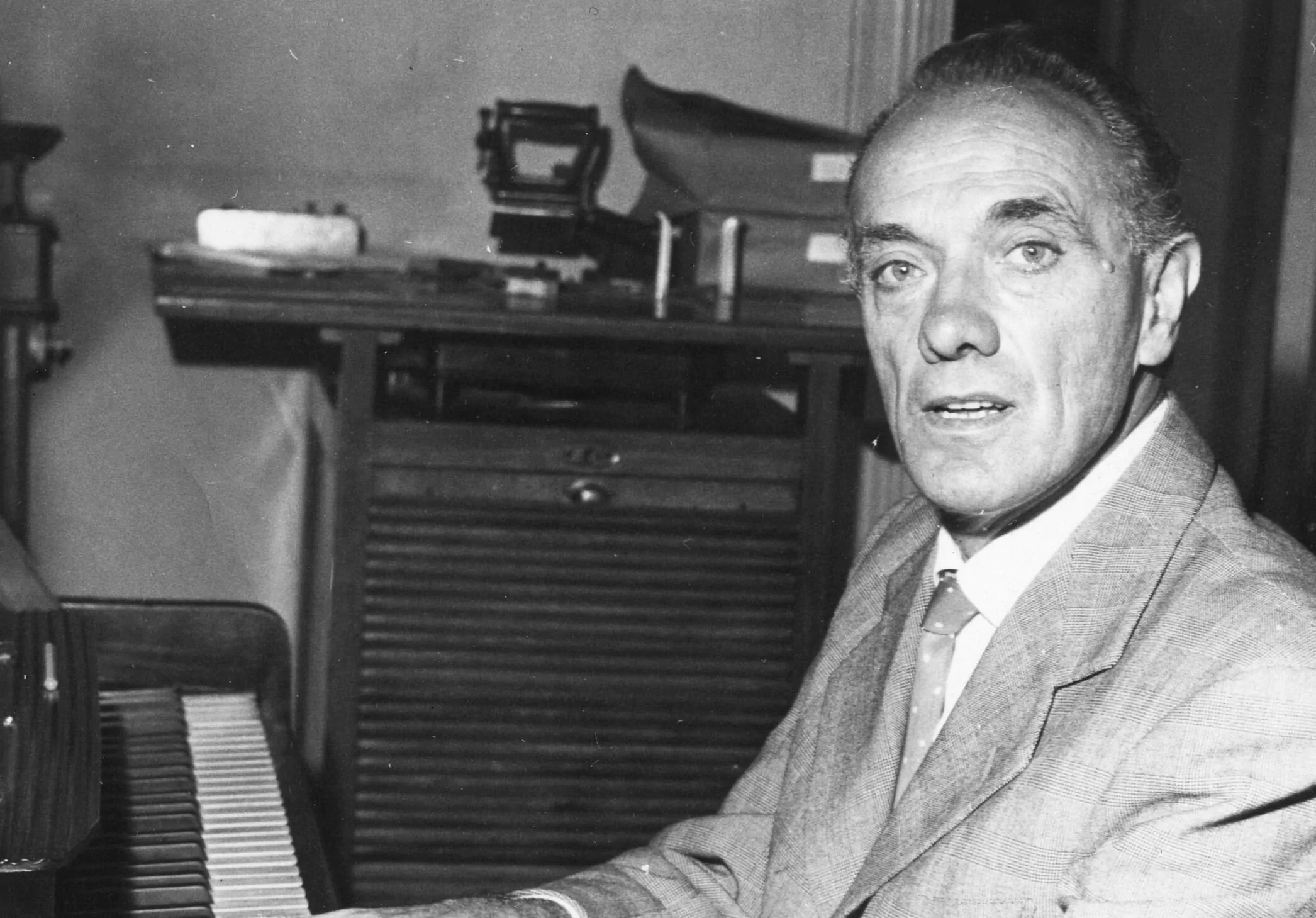
- Panzeri in the 1960s
- Born: 11 October 1911; Milan, Kingdom of Italy
- Died: 19 May 1991 (aged 79); Milan, Italy
- Occupation: Songwriter

Mario Panzeri (11 October 1911 – 19 May 1991) was an Italian lyricist and composer. He is well known for his composed songs that include "Maramao perché sei morto?" "Pippo non lo sa", "Lettera a Pinocchio", and "Grazie dei fiori", which won the first edition of the Sanremo Music Festival in 1951.

Panzeri was the composer of Sanremo Music Festival 1964 and Eurovision Song Contest 1964 winning song "Non ho l'età".

== Life and career ==
Born in Milan, Panzeri started his career as a revue actor and singer. He began composing songs in the second half of the 1930s, having large success with two songs, "Maramao perché sei morto?" and "Pippo non lo sa", which also raised some controversies as they were accused of mocking some important Fascist personalities (Costanzo Ciano and Achille Starace, respectively). In 1951 a song he composed, "Grazie dei fiori", won the first edition of the Sanremo Music Festival. In 1959 his song "Lettera a Pinocchio" was presented at the first edition of the Zecchino d'Oro and later became a hit thanks to the version by Johnny Dorelli.

In the 1960s Panzeri started a successful collaboration with Daniele Pace and his songs contributed to launch the careers of notable singers such as Gigliola Cinquetti, for whom he composed "Non ho l'età", which would go on to win the Sanremo Music Festival 1964 and the Eurovision Song Contest 1964, as well as "Alle porte del sole", "Sì" and other songs; Caterina Caselli, for whom he wrote the hit "Nessuno mi può giudicare"; and Orietta Berti, for whom he composed most of her 1960s–1970s repertoire.
