= Sanremo Music Festival 1966 =

Italian song contest (16th edition)

Dates and venue
- First night: 27 January 1966
- Second night: 28 January 1966
- Final night: 29 January 1966
- Venue: Sanremo Casino; Sanremo, Italy

Organisation
- Organiser: Società ATA

Production
- Broadcaster: Radiotelevisione italiana (RAI)
- Director: Romolo Siena
- Artistic director: Gianni Ravera
- Presenters: Mike Bongiorno and Paola Penni, Carla Maria Puccini

Vote
- Number of entries: 26
- Winner: "Dio, come ti amo" Domenico Modugno and Gigliola Cinquetti

The Sanremo Music Festival 1966 (Italian: Festival di Sanremo 1966), officially the 16th Italian Song Festival (16º Festival della canzone italiana), was the 16th annual Sanremo Music Festival, held at the Sanremo Casino in Sanremo between 27 and 29 January 1966. It was organised by Società ATA, concessionary of the Sanremo Casino and was broadcast by Radiotelevisione italiana (RAI). The shows were presented by Mike Bongiorno, assisted by Paola Penni and Carla Maria Puccini. Gianni Ravera served as artistic director.

Each song was performed twice, by both Italian and foreign artists. The winning song was "Dio, come ti amo" written and composed by Domenico Modugno, performed by both Modugno and Gigliola Cinquetti. Modugno went on to perform the song at the Eurovision Song Contest 1966 representing Italy, where he placed last with 0 points.

== Format ==
The festival was organised by Società ATA, the concessionary of the Sanremo Casino, and held between 27 and 29 January 1966. Gianni Ravera was the artistic director.

In a change from the previous two editions, competing songs were allowed to be performed by two Italian artists or two foreign artists, instead of strictly once by an Italian artist and once by a foreign artist.

=== Voting system ===
The vote in each show was conducted by a regional jury located in fifteen different Italian cities with fifteen members each. In the first two nights, each jury member could vote for six songs, while in the final they only voted for one. As in the 1964 and 1965 editions, only the winner was to be revealed and all other finalists declared tied runners-up.

The method of selecting finalists through a general ranking of all competing entries, used in the 1964 and 1965 editions, was reverted to the system used in 1963 and prior editions, with a set amount of songs qualifying for the final in the first and second night, and announced at the end of the night. A new addition this year was an extra qualifier from each night chosen from the entries not selected for the final by the regional jury, decided by a group of fifteen journalists in the venue chosen by random draw.

== Competing entries ==
ATA received 216 song submissions for the competition. In December 1965, an advisory commission chaired by composer Carlo Savina and composed of journalists Velia Veniero, Angelo Cavallo, Sandro Delli Ponti, Filippo D'Errico, and Rodolfo D'Intino as well as composer Pino Calvi, narrowed down the list of submissions to thirty-five. ATA then chose twenty-six entries from the list to compete in the event, increased from the original aim of twenty-four.

Among the competing artists were Luciana Turina and Plinio Maggi, who were given the right to participate after winning the 1965 edition of the Castrocaro Music Festival for newcomer artists.

For the first time in the festival's history, bands were featured among the competing artists, including the English bands The Yardbirds and The Renegades, and the Italian bands I Ribelli and Equipe 84.

Competing entries
Song	Artist 1	Artist 2	Songwriter(s)
"A la buena de Dios"	I Ribelli	The New Christy Minstrels	Walter Malgoni; Bruno Pallesi
"Adesso sì"	Sergio Endrigo	Chad & Jeremy	Sergio Endrigo
"Così come viene"	Remo Germani	Les Surfs	Ezio Leoni; Vito Pallavicini
"Dio, come ti amo"	Gigliola Cinquetti	Domenico Modugno	Domenico Modugno
"Dipendesse da me"	Luciana Turina	Gino	Iller Pattacini; Vito Pallavicini
"Il ragazzo della via Gluck"	Adriano Celentano	Trio del Clan	Adriano Celentano; Luciano Beretta; Miki Del Prete
"In un fiore"	Wilma Goich	Les Surfs	Carlo Donida; Mogol
"Io non posso crederti"	Franco Tozzi	Bobby Vinton	Gianni Marchetti; Gianni Sanjust
"Io ti amo"	Anna Marchetti	Plinio Maggi	Gianni Fallabrino; Plinio Maggi
"Io ti darò di più"	Orietta Berti	Ornella Vanoni	Memo Remigi; Alberto Testa
"La carta vincente"	Gino Paoli	Ricardo	Gino Paoli
"La notte dell'addio"	Iva Zanicchi	Vic Dana	Giuseppe Diverio; Alberto Testa
"Lei mi aspetta"	Nicola Di Bari	Gene Pitney	Alberto Baldan Bembo; Vito Pallavicini
"Mai mai mai Valentina"	Giorgio Gaber	Pat Boone	Gene Colonnello; Alberto Testa
"Nessuno di voi"	Milva	Richard Anthony	Gorni Kramer; Vito Pallavicini
"Nessuno mi può giudicare"	Caterina Caselli	Gene Pitney	Daniele Pace; Mario Panzeri; Luciano Beretta; Miki Del Prete
"Pafff... bum"	Lucio Dalla	The Yardbirds	Gian Franco Reverberi; Sergio Bardotti
"Parlami di te"	Edoardo Vianello	Françoise Hardy	Edoardo Vianello; Vito Pallavicini
"Per questo voglio te"	Giuseppe Di Stefano	P. J. Proby	Mansueto De Ponti; Mogol
"Quando vado sulla riva"	Luciano Tomei	Luis Alberto del Paraná and Los Paraguayos	Mario Pagano; Franco Maresca
"Questa volta"	Bobby Solo	The Yardbirds	Roberto Satti; Mogol
"Se questo ballo non finisse mai"	John Foster	Paola Bertoni	Gino Mescoli; Vito Pallavicini
"Se tu non fossi qui"	Peppino Gagliardi	Pat Boone	Carlo Alberto Rossi; Marisa Terzi
"Un giorno tu mi cercherai"	Equipe 84	The Renegades	Franco Campanino; Pantros
"Una casa in cima al mondo"	Pino Donaggio	Claudio Villa	Pino Donaggio; Vito Pallavicini
"Una rosa da Vienna"	Anna Identici	The New Christy Minstrels	Gianluigi Guarnieri; Bruno Lauzi

== Shows ==
The festival consisted of three live shows held between 27 and 29 January 1966. The first two nights consisted of thirteen songs performed twice, with seven qualifying from each show to create a final consisting of fourteen songs performed twice. The shows were presented by Mike Bongiorno, who was assisted by Paola Penni and Carla Maria Puccini. The television production was directed by Romolo Siena.

The running orders for all three shows were determined by random draw. The songs were presented in groups of three for the first two nights, while the final was split into two halves, each containing every song performed once. Foreign artists could only perform after an Italian artist performed their song in each show. For songs performed by two Italian artists, a further draw took place to decide what order the artists would perform in.

=== First night ===
The first night took place on 27 January 1966 at 21:15 CET. Thirteen songs were performed and seven were selected for the final.

The vote for the seventh qualifier, as decided by the press jury, ended in a tie between "Così come viene" performed by Remo Germani and Les Surfs, and "Per questo voglio te" performed by Giuseppe Di Stefano and P. J. Proby. Because "Così come viene" was preferred by the regional jury from the two entries, it qualified for the final.

Regional jury qualifier
Press jury qualifier

First night – 27 January 1966
R/O	Song	Artist 1	Artist 2	Result
1	"Se questo ballo non finisse mai"	John Foster	Paola Bertoni	—N/a
2	"Per questo voglio te"	Giuseppe Di Stefano	P. J. Proby	—N/a
3	"Adesso sì"	Sergio Endrigo	Chad & Jeremy	Qualified
4	"Così come viene"	Remo Germani	Les Surfs	Qualified
5	"Dio, come ti amo"	Gigliola Cinquetti	Domenico Modugno	Qualified
6	"Questa volta"	Bobby Solo	The Yardbirds	—N/a
7	"A la buena de Dios"	I Ribelli	The New Christy Minstrels	Qualified
8	"Io non posso crederti"	Franco Tozzi	Bobby Vinton	—N/a
9	"Io ti darò di più"	Ornella Vanoni	Orietta Berti	Qualified
10	"Nessuno mi può giudicare"	Caterina Caselli	Gene Pitney	Qualified
11	"Mai mai mai Valentina"	Giorgio Gaber	Pat Boone	Qualified
12	"Quando vado sulla riva"	Luciano Tomei	Luis Alberto del Paraná and Los Paraguayos	—N/a
13	"Un giorno tu mi cercherai"	Equipe 84	The Renegades	—N/a

=== Second night ===
The second night took place on 28 January 1966 at 21:15 CET. Thirteen songs were performed and seven were selected for the final.

The vote for the seventh qualifier decided by the press jury again ended in a tie, between the three songs: "Se tu non fossi qui" performed by Peppino Gagliardi and Pat Boone, "Io ti amo" performed by Anna Marchetti and Plinio Maggi, and "Pafff... bum" performed by Lucio Dalla and The Yardbirds. "Se tu non fossi qui" was preferred by the regional jury and thus qualified for the final.

Regional jury qualifier
Press jury qualifier

Second night – 28 January 1966
R/O	Song	Artist 1	Artist 2	Result
1	"Il ragazzo della via Gluck"	Adriano Celentano	Trio del Clan	—N/a
2	"Una rosa da Vienna"	Anna Identici	The New Christy Minstrels	Qualified
3	"Nessuno di voi"	Milva	Richard Anthony	Qualified
4	"Dipendesse da me"	Luciana Turina	Gino	—N/a
5	"Se tu non fossi qui"	Peppino Gagliardi	Pat Boone	Qualified
6	"In un fiore"	Wilma Goich	Les Surfs	Qualified
7	"La carta vincente"	Gino Paoli	Ricardo	—N/a
8	"Io ti amo"	Anna Marchetti	Plinio Maggi	—N/a
9	"Una casa in cima al mondo"	Pino Donaggio	Claudio Villa	Qualified
10	"Lei mi aspetta"	Nicola Di Bari	Gene Pitney	—N/a
11	"La notte dell'addio"	Iva Zanicchi	Vic Dana	Qualified
12	"Parlami di te"	Edoardo Vianello	Françoise Hardy	Qualified
13	"Pafff... bum"	Lucio Dalla	The Yardbirds	—N/a

=== Final night ===
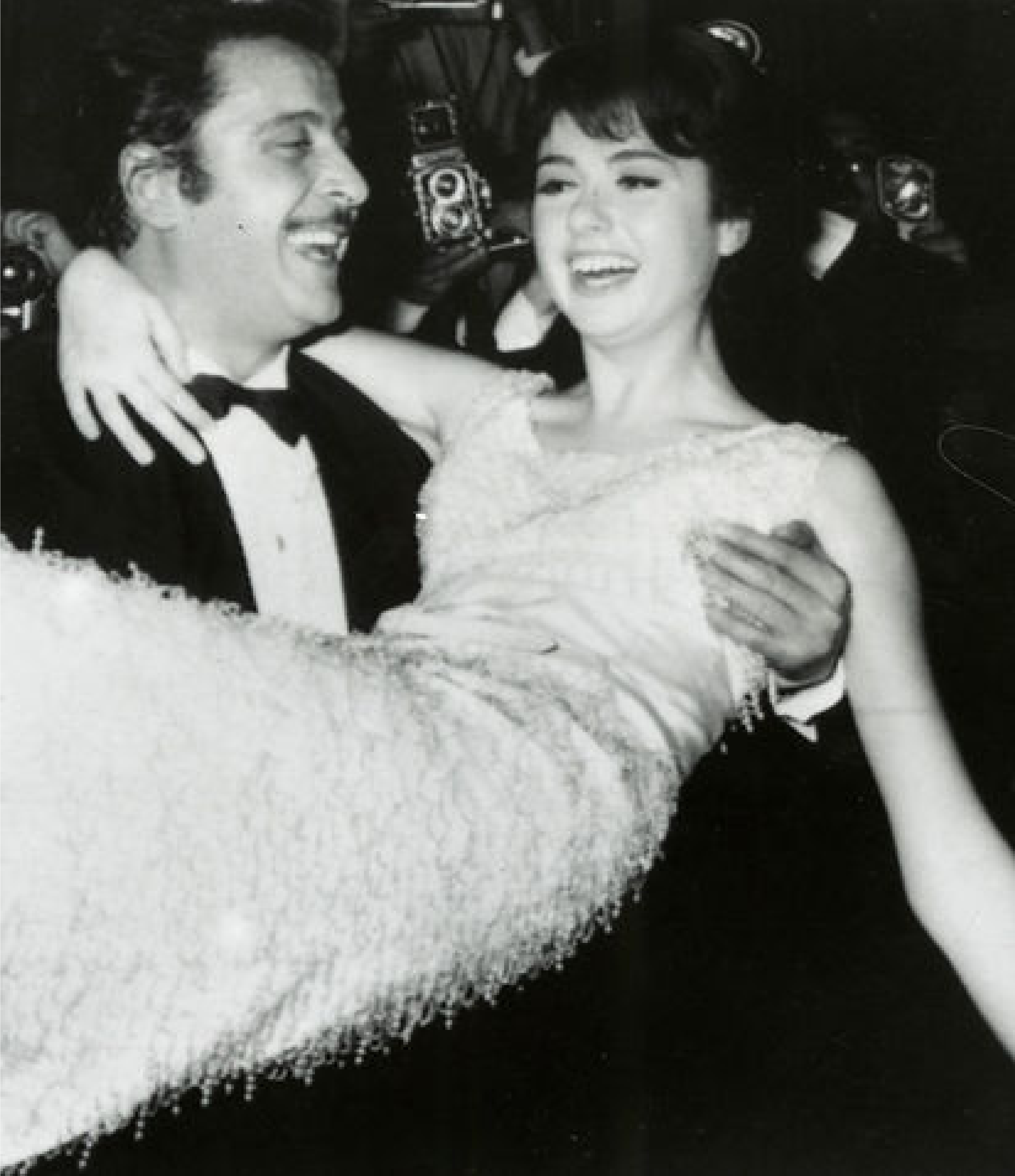
Domenico Modugno and Gigliola Cinquetti celebrating their victory

The final night took place on 29 January 1966 at 21:00 CET. The fourteen songs admitted to the final were performed again and a winner was chosen.

The winning song was "Dio, come ti amo", performed by Domenico Modugno and Gigliola Cinquetti, written and composed by Modugno himself. This was Modugno's fourth victory at the festival both as songwriter and performer, following his wins in the 1958, 1959 and 1962 editions, making him the first artist to achieve this record, as well as Cinquetti's second victory as a performer, following her win in 1964. During the show, only the winner was announced, with the full results only released unofficially by press afterwards.

Winner

Final night – 29 January 1966
R/O	Song	Artist 1	Artist 2	Points	Place
1	"Se tu non fossi qui"	Peppino Gagliardi	Pat Boone	9	8
2	"Parlami di te"	Edoardo Vianello	Françoise Hardy	9	8
3	"Una casa in cima al mondo"	Pino Donaggio	Claudio Villa	16	4
4	"Così come viene"	Remo Germani	Les Surfs	6	12
5	"Nessuno di voi"	Milva	Richard Anthony	9	8
6	"In un fiore"	Wilma Goich	Les Surfs	19	3
7	"Io ti darò di più"	Orietta Berti	Ornella Vanoni	11	6
8	"Adesso sì"	Sergio Endrigo	Chad & Jeremy	9	8
9	"A la buena de Dios"	I Ribelli	The New Christy Minstrels	1	14
10	"La notte dell'addio"	Iva Zanicchi	Vic Dana	5	13
11	"Nessuno mi può giudicare"	Caterina Caselli	Gene Pitney	31	2
12	"Mai mai mai Valentina"	Giorgio Gaber	Pat Boone	11	6
13	"Una rosa da Vienna"	Anna Identici	The New Christy Minstrels	14	5
14	"Dio, come ti amo"	Gigliola Cinquetti	Domenico Modugno	77	1

== Broadcasts ==
=== Local broadcast ===
The first and second nights were broadcast on Secondo Programma (radio) and on Secondo Programma (television) at 21:15 CET, while the final night was broadcast on Programma Nazionale (television) and on Secondo Programma (radio) at 21:00 CET. In Italy, the final was broadcast on television to an estimated 21.3 million viewers, with the first and second nights broadcast to an estimated 17.3 and 16.2 million viewers respectively.

=== International broadcast ===
The first half of the final night was broadcast via the Eurovision and Intervision networks in other countries. Known details on the broadcasts in each country, including the specific broadcasting stations and commentators are shown in the tables below.

International broadcasters of the Sanremo Music Festival 1966
Country	Broadcaster	Channel(s)	Commentator(s)	Ref(s)
Brazil	Rádio Jornal do Brasil (Note: Delayed broadcast on 13 February at 12:40 (BRT))			
Colombia	Radio Sutatenza (Note: Delayed four-part broadcast from 28 February to 3 March at 21:30 (CST))			
Costa Rica	Radiolandia (Note: Delayed broadcast on 13 March at 19:00 (CST))			
Czechoslovakia	ČST	ČST		
France	ORTF	Deuxième Chaîne (Note: Delayed broadcast on 13 February at 17:15 (CET))		
Hungary	MTV	MTV		
Poland	TP	TV Polska		
Portugal	RTP	RTP		
Romania	TVR	TVR (Note: Delayed broadcast on 27 February 1966 at 22:25 (EET))		
Soviet Union	CT USSR	Programme Two (Note: Delayed broadcast on 2 February at 22:30 (MSD))		
Switzerland	SRG SSR	TSR	Georges Hardy	
Yugoslavia	JRT	Televizija Beograd		
Yugoslavia	JRT	Televizija Ljubljana (Note: Deferred broadcast in a shortened format on the following day at 17:00 (CET))		
Yugoslavia	JRT	Radio Novi Sad (Note: Delayed broadcast on 20 March at 20:20 (CET))		

== Incidents and controversies ==
=== Dispute over Bobby Solo's participation ===
After the song "Questa volta" written by Mogol and Bobby Solo was accepted into the competition, the festival's broadcaster, Radiotelevisione italiana (RAI), made a request to ATA to prevent Solo from performing the song. Their request was announced alongside a six-month suspension period on his television appearances on the network due to his repeated acts of indiscipline. ATA accepted the request, forcing his record label Dischi Ricordi to announce his replacement with the vocal group I Musicals. However, after Solo apologized to RAI through a written letter, they went back on their decision and allowed the label to reinstate his participation.

=== Protests ===
Throughout the week of the festival, Italian press disparagingly referred to several of the competing artists as "capelloni" (long-haired). To protest, during their performance of "A la buena de Dios", the band I Ribelli wore long-haired wigs on stage and took them off halfway through.

At the end of the second night, it was revealed that the song "Il ragazzo della via Gluck" performed by Adriano Celentano and Trio del Clan had failed to qualify for the final, in addition to most of the competing bands in the competition. This caused outrage with supporters of Celentano and members of his record label Clan Celentano, who arranged a protest in the final night during I Ribelli's performance of "A la buena de Dios", since they were the only band admitted to the final. The band removing their wigs mid-performance became a signal for protesters to enter the Sanremo Casino, loudly cheering for I Ribelli and chanting the band's name for several minutes. The connection to Eurovision was briefly cut during the protest. Around a dozen protesters were detained by police, including one of the songwriters of "Il ragazzo della via Gluck", Miki Del Prete.

=== Fainting incidents ===
During the second night, while introducing the last performance of the show, "Pafff... bum" performed by The Yardbirds, one of the festival's presenters, Carla Maria Puccini, suddenly fainted while on stage. She had been malnourished and passed out from heat, as the Sanremo Casino lacked air conditioning. Later that evening, Peppino Gagliardi also fainted while waiting for the results backstage. In the final, one of the members of Les Surfs fainted, causing a delay in their arrival on stage for their performance of "In un fiore".
