= Sanremo Music Festival 1965 =

Italian song contest (15th edition)

Dates and venue
- First night: 28 January 1965
- Second night: 29 January 1965
- Final night: 30 January 1965
- Venue: Sanremo Casino; Sanremo, Italy

Organisation
- Organiser: Società ATA

Production
- Broadcaster: Radiotelevisione italiana (RAI)
- Director: Romolo Siena
- Artistic director: Gianni Ravera
- Presenters: Mike Bongiorno and Grazia Maria Spina

Vote
- Number of entries: 24
- Winner: "Se piangi, se ridi" Bobby Solo and The New Christy Minstrels

The Sanremo Music Festival 1965 (Italian: Festival di Sanremo 1965), officially the 15th Italian Song Festival (15º Festival della canzone italiana), was the 15th annual Sanremo Music Festival, held at the Sanremo Casino in Sanremo between 28 and 30 January 1965. It was organised by Società ATA, concessionary of the Sanremo Casino and was broadcast by Radiotelevisione italiana (RAI). The shows were presented by Mike Bongiorno, assisted by Grazia Maria Spina. Gianni Ravera served as artistic director.

Each song was performed twice, once by an artist from Italy and once by an artist from abroad. The winning song was "Se piangi, se ridi" written by Mogol, Gianni Marchetti and Bobby Solo, and performed by both Solo and The New Christy Minstrels. Solo went on to perform the song for Italy at the Eurovision Song Contest 1965, held on home soil in Naples, achieving fifth place.

In January 2025, to celebrate the edition's 60th anniversary, RAI made the final available to view on their streaming service RaiPlay.

== Format ==
The festival was organised by Società ATA, the concessionary of the Sanremo Casino and held between 28 and 30 January 1965. Gianni Ravera reprised his role as artistic director.

The format stayed largely the same as the format from the 1964 edition. Each song was performed twice, once by an Italian artist and once by a foreign artist. Italian artists were limited to performing only one song, while foreign artists were allowed to perform two.

=== Voting system ===
For the first two nights, the vote was conducted by twenty different juries with fifteen members each, proportionally represented between gender, age and social class. For the final, the vote was conducted by juries in sixteen different Italian cities, with four more juries set up in two schools, a university and a recruit training centre. The cities were chosen by random draw and differed in each show. Jury members gave one vote to five different songs. As in the 1964 edition, the votes from the first two nights were combined into one ranking, with the top twelve songs qualifying for the final and announced at the end of the second night. For the final, only the winner was announced, all other finalists declared tied runners-up and the full results kept secret.

== Competing entries ==
ATA received 242 song submissions from music publishers for the competition. An advisory commission chaired by composer Carlo Savina, composed of the seven journalists Giorgio Berti, Angelo Cavallo, Sandro Delli Ponti, Filippo D'Errico, Rodolfo D'Intino, Vittorio Franchini and Velia Veniero, narrowed down the list of submissions to thirty-five in November 1964. ATA then selected twenty-four for the competition in December.

Before the list of twenty-four songs was finalised, the record label RCA Records decided to withdraw their participation in protest of ATA not accepting all five of the songs they wanted chosen for the event, planned to be performed by their artists Paul Anka, Alain Barrière, Dalida, Neil Sedaka and Gino Paoli.

Among the competing Italian artists were Vittorio Inzaina and Franco Tozzi, who were given the right to participate after winning the 1964 edition of the Castrocaro Music Festival for newcomer artists.

Both the American singer Dionne Warwick and the English singer Julie Rogers were initially included on the list of competing artists released by ATA on 11 January, set to perform the songs "Di fronte all'amore" and "Aspetta domani" respectively, but their record label announced their withdrawal from the competition shortly after. Rogers was replaced by Kiki Dee, while Dusty Springfield took up "Di fronte all'amore" as her second song in Warwick's absence.

Competing entries
| Song | Italian artist | Foreign artist | Songwriter(s) |
|---|---|---|---|
| "Abbracciami forte" | Ornella Vanoni | Udo Jürgens | Carlo Donida; Mogol |
| "Amici miei" | Nicola Di Bari | Gene Pitney | Gene Colonnello; Vito Pallavicini |
| "Aspetta domani" | Fred Bongusto | Kiki Dee | Fred Bongusto |
| "Cominciamo ad amarci" | John Foster | Joe Damiano | Gino Mescoli; Vito Pallavicini |
| "Devi essere tu" | Ricky Gianco | Jody Miller | Ricky Gianco; Vincenzo D'Acquisto |
| "Di fronte all'amore" | Gianni Mascolo | Dusty Springfield | Umberto Bindi; Silvana Simoni |
| "E poi verrà l'autunno" | Don Miko | Timi Yuro | Aristide Bascerano; Antonio Amurri |
| "Ho bisogno di vederti" | Gigliola Cinquetti | Connie Francis | Roberto Ciampi; Ramsete |
| "I tuoi anni più belli" | Iva Zanicchi | Gene Pitney | Enrico Polito; Mogol; Mimma Gaspari |
| "Il tuo amore" | Bruno Lauzi | Kenny Rankin | Bruno Lauzi |
| "Invece no" | Betty Curtis | Petula Clark | Ezio Leoni; Vito Pallavicini |
| "Io che non vivo (senza te)" | Pino Donaggio | Jody Miller | Pino Donaggio; Vito Pallavicini |
| "Io non volevo" | Giordano Colombo | Hoagy Lands | Gian Piero Reverberi; Saro Leva |
| "L'amore è partito" | Beppe Cardile | Anita Harris | Beppe Cardile |
| "L'amore ha i tuoi occhi" | Bruno Filippini | Yukari Itō | Gorni Kramer; Vito Pallavicini |
| "Le colline sono in fiore" | Wilma Goich | The New Christy Minstrels | Renato Angiolini; Calibi |
| "Mia cara" | Robertino | Danyel Gérard | Pino Massara; Mogol |
| "Non a caso il destino (ci ha fatto incontrare)" | Franco Tozzi | Johnny Tillotson | Carlo Alberto Rossi; Antartide |
| "Prima o poi" | Remo Germani and Le Amiche | Audrey | Giorgio Ferrari; Antonio Amurri |
| "Se piangi, se ridi" | Bobby Solo | The New Christy Minstrels | Gianni Marchetti; Roberto Satti; Mogol |
| "Si vedrà" | Vittorio Inzaina | Les Surfs | Calogero Lentini; Alberico Gentile |
| "Ti credo" | Peppino Gagliardi | Timi Yuro | Peppino Gagliardi; Gaetano Amendola |
| "Tu che ne sai" | Fabrizio Ferretti | Dusty Springfield | Franco Pisano; Antonio Amurri |
| "Vieni con noi" | Milva | Bernd Spier | Mario Pagano; Franco Maresca |

== Shows ==
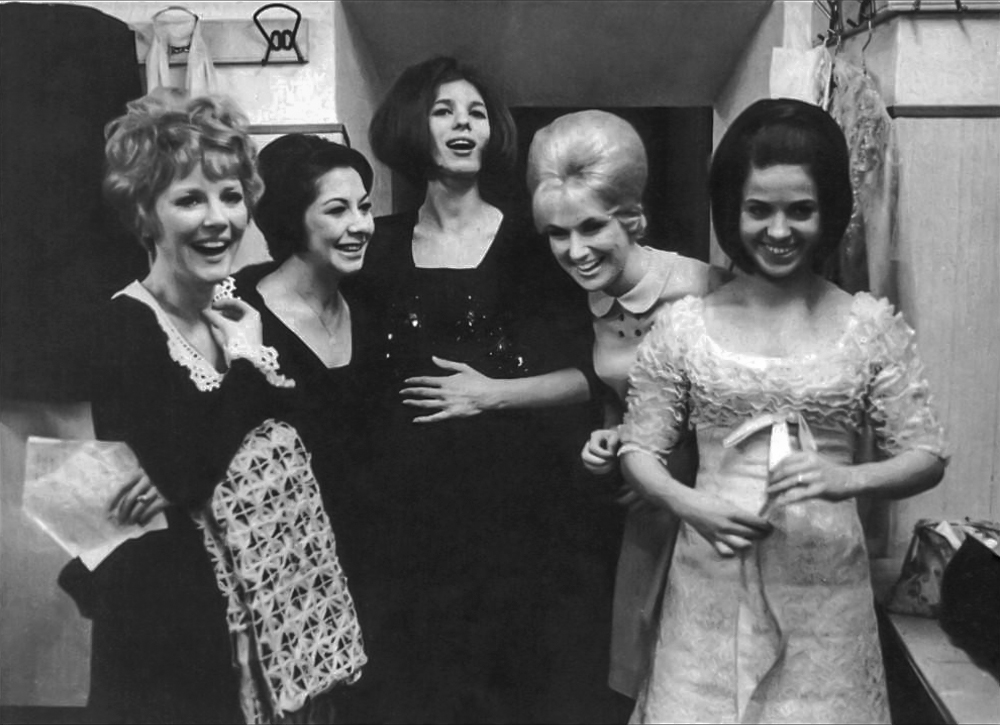
Petula Clark, Timi Yuro, Iva Zanicchi, Dusty Springfield and Audrey in a dressing room during the festival

The festival consisted of three live shows held between 28 and 30 January 1965. Each night consisted of twelve songs performed twice, once by an Italian artist and once by an artist of foreign origin. The shows were presented by Mike Bongiorno, who was assisted by Grazia Maria Spina. The television production was directed by Romolo Siena.

During the first two nights, the songs were presented in groups of three, with foreign artists always performing their songs after an Italian artist had already done so. The running orders were determined by random draw, decided on the day they took place. For the final, all of the Italian artists performed in the first half of the show, followed by the foreign artists in the second half.

=== First night ===
The first night took place on 28 January 1965 at 21:10 CET. The first twelve songs were performed.

Qualifier

First night – 28 January 1965
| R/O | Song | Italian artist | Foreign artist | Result |
|---|---|---|---|---|
| 1 | "E poi verrà l'autunno" | Don Miko | Timi Yuro | —N/a |
| 2 | "Di fronte all'amore" | Gianni Mascolo | Dusty Springfield | —N/a |
| 3 | "Invece no" | Betty Curtis | Petula Clark | Qualified |
| 4 | "I tuoi anni più belli" | Iva Zanicchi | Gene Pitney | —N/a |
| 5 | "L'amore è partito" | Beppe Cardile | Anita Harris | —N/a |
| 6 | "L'amore ha i tuoi occhi" | Bruno Filippini | Yukari Ito | Qualified |
| 7 | "Prima o poi" | Remo Germani and Le Amiche | Audrey | Qualified |
| 8 | "Le colline sono in fiore" | Wilma Goich | The New Christy Minstrels | Qualified |
| 9 | "Non a caso il destino (ci ha fatto incontrare)" | Franco Tozzi | Johnny Tillotson | —N/a |
| 10 | "Io che non vivo (senza te)" | Pino Donaggio | Jody Miller | Qualified |
| 11 | "Si vedrà" | Vittorio Inzaina | Les Surfs | Qualified |
| 12 | "Vieni con noi" | Milva | Bernd Spier | Qualified |

=== Second night ===
The second night took place on 29 January 1965 at 21:10 CET. The last twelve songs were performed and the twelve finalists were decided.

Qualifier

Second night – 29 January 1965
| R/O | Song | Italian artist | Foreign artist | Result |
|---|---|---|---|---|
| 1 | "Se piangi, se ridi" | Bobby Solo | The New Christy Minstrels | Qualified |
| 2 | "Cominciamo ad amarci" | John Foster | Joe Damiano | —N/a |
| 3 | "Devi essere tu" | Ricky Gianco | Jody Miller | —N/a |
| 4 | "Ti credo" | Peppino Gagliardi | Timi Yuro | —N/a |
| 5 | "Il tuo amore" | Bruno Lauzi | Kenny Rankin | —N/a |
| 6 | "Abbracciami forte" | Ornella Vanoni | Udo Jürgens | Qualified |
| 7 | "Ho bisogno di vederti" | Gigliola Cinquetti | Connie Francis | Qualified |
| 8 | "Mia cara" | Robertino | Danyel Gérard | —N/a |
| 9 | "Io non volevo" | Giordano Colombo | Hoagy Lands | —N/a |
| 10 | "Tu che ne sai" | Fabrizio Ferretti | Dusty Springfield | —N/a |
| 11 | "Amici miei" | Nicola Di Bari | Gene Pitney | Qualified |
| 12 | "Aspetta domani" | Fred Bongusto | Kiki Dee | Qualified |

=== Final night ===
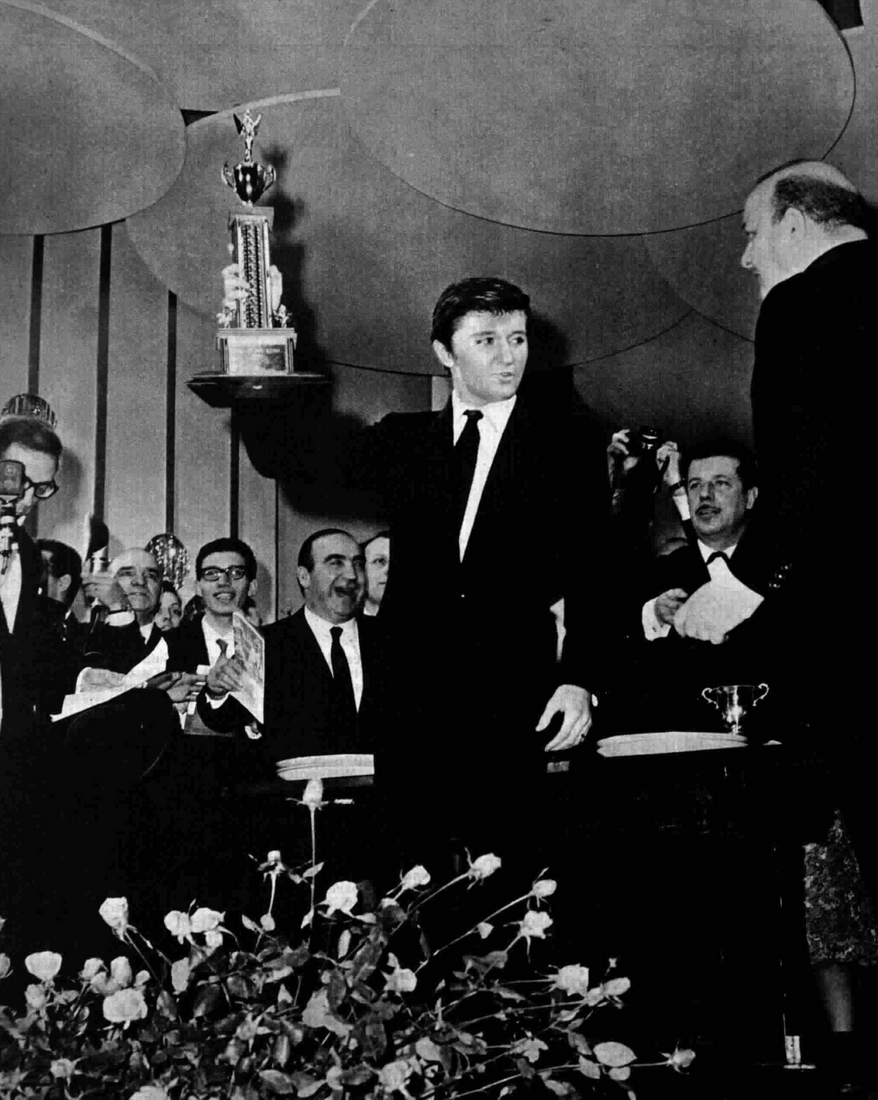
Bobby Solo holding the first prize

The final night took place on 30 January 1965 at 21:00 CET. The twelve songs admitted to the final were performed again and a winner was chosen.

The winning song was "Se piangi, se ridi", written by Mogol, Gianni Marchetti and Bobby Solo, and was performed by Solo and the American group The New Christy Minstrels.

Winner

Final night – 30 January 1965
| R/O | Song | Italian artist | Foreign artist |
|---|---|---|---|
| 1 | "Se piangi, se ridi" | Bobby Solo | The New Christy Minstrels |
| 2 | "Aspetta domani" | Fred Bongusto | Kiki Dee |
| 3 | "Abbracciami forte" | Ornella Vanoni | Udo Jürgens |
| 4 | "Vieni con noi" | Milva | Bernd Spier |
| 5 | "Le colline sono in fiore" | Wilma Goich | The New Christy Minstrels |
| 6 | "L'amore ha i tuoi occhi" | Bruno Filippini | Yukari Ito |
| 7 | "Si vedrà" | Vittorio Inzaina | Les Surfs |
| 8 | "Ho bisogno di vederti" | Gigliola Cinquetti | Connie Francis |
| 9 | "Prima o poi" | Remo Germani and Le Amiche | Audrey |
| 10 | "Amici miei" | Nicola Di Bari | Gene Pitney |
| 11 | "Invece no" | Betty Curtis | Petula Clark |
| 12 | "Io che non vivo (senza te)" | Pino Donaggio | Jody Miller |

== Broadcasts ==
=== Local broadcast ===
The final night was broadcast on Programma Nazionale (television) and on Secondo Programma (radio) at 21:00 CET.. Only part of the first two nights were broadcast on Secondo Programma (television) starting at 21:15, while they were broadcast in full on Secondo Programma (radio) starting at 21:10 CET. In Italy, the final was broadcast on television to an estimated 17.2 million viewers, with the first and second nights broadcast to an estimated 15.6 and 14.1 million viewers respectively.

=== International broadcast ===
The first half of the final night was broadcast via the Eurovision network in other countries. The festival was reportedly aired by broadcasters in France, Monaco, Germany, Switzerland, Czechoslovakia, Ireland and Portugal. Known details on the broadcasts in each country, including the specific broadcasting stations and commentators are shown in the tables below.

International broadcasters of the Sanremo Music Festival 1965
| Country | Broadcaster | Channel(s) | Commentator(s) | Ref(s) |
|---|---|---|---|---|
| Argentina | Canal 13 (Note: Delayed broadcast on 20 March at 21:00 (ART)) | | | |
| Belgium | BRT | BRT (Note: Delayed broadcast on 21 February at 16:20 (CET)) | | |
| East Germany | DFF | DFF (Note: Delayed broadcast the following day at 20:50 (CET)) | | |
| Hungary | MTV | MTV | | |
| Japan | NHK | NHK (Note: Delayed broadcast on 17 April at 14:10 (JST)) | Yutaka Ishida | |
| New Zealand | 3YD (Note: Delayed broadcast on 6 January 1966 at 19:00 (NZDT)) | | | |
| Poland | TP | TV Polska | | |
| Spain | TVE | TVE | | |
| Spain | RNE | RNE | | |
| Yugoslavia | JRT | Televizija Beograd | | |
| Yugoslavia | JRT | Televizija Ljubljana | | |
