= Sanremo Music Festival 1964 =

Italian song contest (14th edition)

Dates and venue
- First night: 30 January 1964
- Second night: 31 January 1964
- Final night: 1 February 1964
- Venue: Sanremo Casino; Sanremo, Italy

Organisation
- Organiser: Società ATA

Production
- Broadcaster: Radiotelevisione italiana (RAI)
- Director: Romolo Siena
- Artistic director: Gianni Ravera
- Presenters: Mike Bongiorno and Giuliana Lojodice

Vote
- Number of entries: 24
- Winner: "Non ho l'età (per amarti)" Gigliola Cinquetti and Patricia Carli

The Sanremo Music Festival 1964 (Italian: Festival di Sanremo 1964), officially the 14th Italian Song Festival (14º Festival della canzone italiana), was the 14th annual Sanremo Music Festival, held at the Sanremo Casino in Sanremo between 30 January and 1 February 1964. It was organised by Società ATA, concessionary of the Sanremo Casino, and broadcast by Radiotelevisione italiana (RAI). The shows were presented by Mike Bongiorno, assisted by Giuliana Lojodice. Gianni Ravera served as artistic director.

Each song was performed twice, once by an artist from Italy and once by an artist from abroad. The winning song was "Non ho l'età (per amarti)", written by Nicola Salerno and composed by Mario Panzeri, and performed by both Gigliola Cinquetti and Patricia Carli. Cinquetti went on to perform the song at the Eurovision Song Contest 1964, ultimately securing Italy's first victory in the event.

This edition brought several changes to the contest's format, such as the inclusion of foreign performers, the full voting results not revealed and the use of only one orchestra with multiple conductors.

In 2024, to celebrate the edition's 60th anniversary, RAI made the final available to view on their streaming service RaiPlay.

== Format ==
The festival was organised by Società ATA, the concessionary of the Sanremo Casino and held between 30 January and 1 February 1964. Gianni Ravera was the artistic director.

Several changes were made to the contest's format following the lack of success from the previous edition. For the first time in the festival's history, foreign artists were allowed to compete, with each song performed twice, once by an Italian artist and once by an artist of foreign origin. Foreign artists were also allowed to perform in their native language.

Unlike previous editions with two orchestras, only one thirty-seven piece orchestra was offered to performers, with twenty-three alternating conductors chosen for each performance by the respective record label of the performer.

=== Voting system ===
The voting was conducted by twenty regional juries in cities across Italy, each composed of fifteen members of various ages, professions and social classes. After all songs had been performed across the first two nights, the votes of the jury would combine into a general ranking in which the top twelve songs would qualify for the final and be announced at the end of the second night. During the final, only the winner was to be announced, all other finalists declared tied runners-up and the votes never revealed.

== Competing entries ==
217 songs were submitted to ATA for the competition. The submissions were listened to by members of ATA with a group of consultants, who were to choose a maximum of twenty participating songs. Eventually twenty-four were selected to compete.

Among the competing Italian artists were Bruno Filippini and Gigliola Cinquetti, who were given the right to participate after winning the 1963 edition of the Castrocaro Music Festival for newcomer artists.

Initially American singer Lou Monte was announced among the competing artists, set to perform "Sole, pizza e amore" and "Piccolo piccolo", but withdrew due to the death of his son from leukemia. He was replaced by Marina Moran as the performer for "Sole, pizza e amore", while Peter Kraus took up "Piccolo piccolo" as his second song. Vocal quartet Quartetto Cetra were also announced as performers for "Sole, pizza e amore", but were unable to attend due to prior commitments. They were replaced by Aurelio Fierro.

Competing entries
Song	Italian artist	Foreign artist	Songwriter(s)
"20 km al giorno"	Nicola Arigliano	Peter Kraus	Pino Massara; Mogol
"Che me ne importa a me"	Domenico Modugno	Frankie Laine	Domenico Modugno
"Come potrei dimenticarti"	Tony Dallara	Ben E. King	Ezio Leoni; Vito Pallavicini
"Così felice"	Giorgio Gaber	Patricia Carli	Giorgio Gaber
"E se domani"	Fausto Cigliano	Gene Pitney	Carlo Alberto Rossi; Giorgio Calabrese
"I sorrisi di sera"	Tony Renis	Frankie Avalon	Tony Renis; Mogol; Alberto Testa
"Ieri ho incontrato mia madre"	Gino Paoli	Antonio Prieto	Gino Paoli
"L'inverno cosa fai?"	Piero Focaccia	Bobby Rydell	Gene Colonnello; Nisa
"L'ultimo tram"	Milva	Frida Boccara	Eros Sciorilli; Giorgio Calabrese
"La prima che incontro"	Fabrizio Ferretti	The Fraternity Brothers	Gorni Kramer; Vito Pallavicini
"Mezzanotte"	Cocky Mazzetti	Los Hermanos Rigual	Angelo Rotunno; Carlo Rossi
"Motivo d'amore"	Pino Donaggio	Frankie Avalon	Pino Donaggio
"Non ho l'età (per amarti)"	Gigliola Cinquetti	Patricia Carli	Mario Panzeri; Nisa
"Ogni volta"	Roby Ferrante	Paul Anka	Robifer; Carlo Rossi
"Passo su passo"	Claudio Villa	Peggy March	Umberto Bindi; Franco Migliacci
"Piccolo piccolo"	Emilio Pericoli	Peter Kraus	Lelio Luttazzi; Antonio Amurri
"Quando vedrai la mia ragazza"	Little Tony	Gene Pitney	Enrico Ciacci; Giangrano
"Sabato sera"	Bruno Filippini	The Fraternity Brothers	Walter Malgoni; Bruno Pallesi
"Sole, pizza e amore"	Aurelio Fierro	Marina Moran	Antonio Virgilio Savona; Tata Giacobetti
"Sole sole"	Laura Villa	Los Hermanos Rigual	Arturo Casadei; Laura Zanin
"Stasera no no no"	Remo Germani	Nino Tempo & April Stevens	Evasio Roncarati; Vito Pallavicini
"Tu piangi per niente"	Lilly Bonato	Richard Moser Jr.	Piero Soffici; Vito Pallavicini
"Un bacio piccolissimo"	Robertino	Bobby Rydell	Gino Mescoli; Giovanni Ornati
"Una lacrima sul viso"	Bobby Solo	Frankie Laine	Lunero; Mogol

== Shows ==
The festival consisted of three live shows held between 30 January 1964 and 1 February. Each night consisted of twelve songs performed twice, once by an Italian artist and once by an artist of foreign origin. All shows were presented by Mike Bongiorno, who was assisted by Giuliana Lojodice. The television production was directed by Romolo Siena.

=== First night ===
The first night took place on 30 January 1964 at 22:30 CET. The first twelve songs were performed.

Qualifier

First night – 30 January 1964
R/O	Song	Italian artist	Foreign artist	Result
1	"Passo su passo"	Claudio Villa	Peggy March	—N/a
2	"Un bacio piccolissimo"	Robertino	Bobby Rydell	Qualified
3	"L'ultimo tram"	Milva	Frida Boccara	—N/a
4	"Una lacrima sul viso"	Bobby Solo	Frankie Laine	Qualified
5	"E se domani"	Fausto Cigliano	Gene Pitney	—N/a
6	"Mezzanotte"	Cocky Mazzetti	Los Hermanos Rigual	—N/a
7	"Non ho l'età (per amarti)"	Gigliola Cinquetti	Patricia Carli	Qualified
8	"20 km al giorno"	Nicola Arigliano	Peter Kraus	—N/a
9	"Sole, pizza e amore"	Aurelio Fierro	Marina Moran	—N/a
10	"I sorrisi di sera"	Tony Renis	Frankie Avalon	—N/a
11	"Stasera no no no"	Remo Germani	Nino Tempo & April Stevens	Qualified
12	"La prima che incontro"	Fabrizio Ferretti	The Fraternity Brothers	Qualified

=== Second night ===
The second night took place on 31 January 1964 at 21:35 CET. The last twelve songs were performed and the twelve finalists were decided.

Qualifier

Second night – 31 January 1964
R/O	Song	Italian artist	Foreign artist	Result
1	"Sabato sera"	Bruno Filippini	The Fraternity Brothers	Qualified
2	"Sole sole"	Laura Villa	Los Hermanos Rigual	—N/a
3	"Ogni volta"	Roby Ferrante	Paul Anka	Qualified
4	"Quando vedrai la mia ragazza"	Little Tony	Gene Pitney	Qualified
5	"Così felice"	Giorgio Gaber	Patricia Carli	—N/a
6	"L'inverno cosa fai?"	Piero Focaccia	Bobby Rydell	—N/a
7	"Che me ne importa a me"	Domenico Modugno	Frankie Laine	Qualified
8	"Ieri ho incontrato mia madre"	Gino Paoli	Antonio Prieto	Qualified
9	"Come potrei dimenticarti"	Tony Dallara	Ben E. King	Qualified
10	"Motivo d'amore"	Pino Donaggio	Frankie Avalon	Qualified
11	"Tu piangi per niente"	Lilly Bonato	Richard Moser Jr.	—N/a
12	"Piccolo piccolo"	Emilio Pericoli	Peter Kraus	—N/a

=== Final night ===
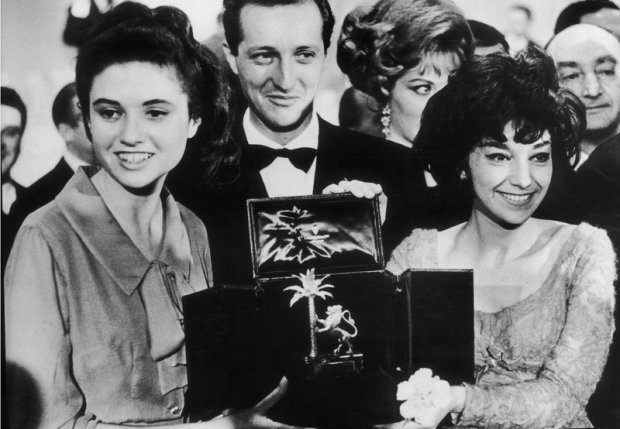
Gigliola Cinquetti (left) and Patricia Carli holding the first prize

The final night took place on 1 February 1964 at 21:35 CET. The twelve songs admitted to the final were performed again and a winner was chosen.

The song "Una lacrima sul viso" performed by Bobby Solo and Frankie Laine was disqualified shortly before the show due to Solo's refusal to perform the song live. He claimed he was unable to sing due to laryngitis and used playback during the first night. The song was admitted to the final on the condition that Solo would have to perform it live or face disqualification. He refused again, so the song was instead performed by both artists out-of-competition for the final night.

The winning song was "Non ho l'età (per amarti)", written by Nicola Salerno and composed by Mario Panzeri, performed by Gigliola Cinquetti in Italian and by Patricia Carli in French under the title "Je suis à toi".

Winner
Disqualified

Final night – 1 February 1964
R/O	Song	Italian artist	Foreign artist
1	"Ieri ho incontrato mia madre"	Gino Paoli	Antonio Prieto
2	~~"Una lacrima sul viso"~~	~~Bobby Solo~~	~~Frankie Laine~~ (Note: Performed in English under the title "For Your Love")
3	"Che me ne importa a me"	Domenico Modugno	Frankie Laine
4	"Ogni volta"	Roby Ferrante	Paul Anka
5	"Stasera no no no"	Remo Germani	Nino Tempo & April Stevens
6	"Un bacio piccolissimo"	Robertino	Bobby Rydell
7	"Sabato sera"	Bruno Filippini	The Fraternity Brothers
8	"Come potrei dimenticarti"	Tony Dallara	Ben E. King (Note: Performed in English under the title "Around the Corner")
9	"Non ho l'età (per amarti)"	Gigliola Cinquetti	Patricia Carli (Note: Performed in French under the title "Je suis à toi")
10	"Motivo d'amore"	Pino Donaggio	Frankie Avalon
11	"La prima che incontro"	Fabrizio Ferretti	The Fraternity Brothers
12	"Quando vedrai la mia ragazza"	Little Tony	Gene Pitney

== Broadcasts ==
=== Local broadcast ===
The final night was broadcast on Programma Nazionale (television) and Secondo Programma (radio) beginning at 21:35 CET. The first night was broadcast at 22:30 CET on Secondo Programma (radio), with only the first half of the show broadcast on Secondo Programma (television), while the second night was broadcast in full both on Secondo Programma (television) and Secondo Programma (radio) at 21:35 CET. The final was broadcast on television in Italy to an estimated 14 million viewers.

=== International broadcast ===
The final night was broadcast via the Eurovision network in other countries. Known details on the broadcasts in each country, including the specific broadcasting stations and commentators are shown in the tables below.

International broadcasters of the Sanremo Music Festival 1964
Country	Broadcaster	Channel(s)	Commentator(s)	Ref(s)
Brazil	Rádio Jornal do Brasil (Note: Delayed broadcast on 7 February at 22:00 BRT.)			
Monaco	Radio Monte Carlo			
Yugoslavia	JRT	Televizija Beograd		
Yugoslavia	JRT	Televizija Ljubljana		
