= Goich =

Goich may refer to:

- Dan Goich (born 1944), a former professional American football player
- Wilma Goich (born 1945), Italian pop singer and television personality

== See also ==
- Goichi
