= Franco Simone =

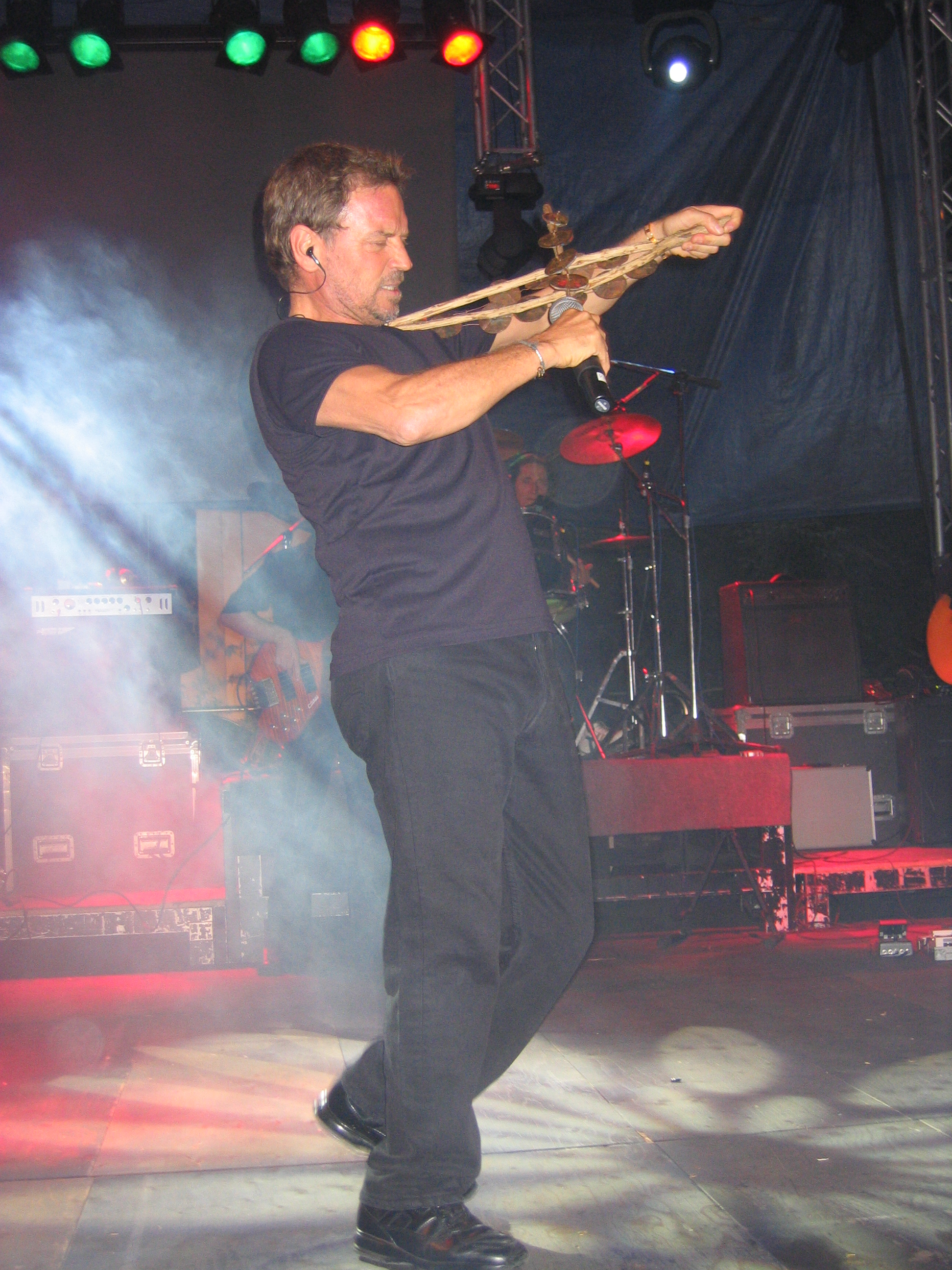
- Franco Simone (2004)

Background information
- Born: Francesco Luigi Simone; 21 July 1949 (age 77); Acquarica del Capo, Apulia, Italy
- Genres: Pop; pop rock; chanson
- Occupations: Singer; songwriter; composer; television host
- Instruments: Vocals; guitar
- Years active: 1972–present
- Label: Ri-Fi

Francesco Luigi "Franco" Simone (born 21 July 1949) is an Italian singer-songwriter, composer and television host, known as il poeta con la chitarra ("the poet with the guitar") for the poetical value of his lyrics.

== Background ==
Born in Acquarica del Capo in the province of Lecce, Apulia, Simone started his career winning the Castrocaro Music Festival in 1972. In 1974 he entered the competition at the Sanremo Music Festival with the song "Fiume grande", obtaining his first success in the Italian hit parade. "Fiume grande" also had a significant international success in its French and Spanish version (under the titles, respectively, "Je ne comprends plus rien" and "Río Grande").

In 1976, with the LP Il poeta con la chitarra, Simone got his main success in Italy with the song "Tu e così sia", which peaked fourth in the Italian hit parade. In the following years Simone grew his international popularity, especially in Latin America, where he gradually focused his career.

In 1977 he released the LP Respiro, whose title track remains among Simone's most popular songs on streaming. The following year (1978) he released the album Paesaggio (Landscape), which reached the top of the hit charts in Argentina. The song Paisaje became one of the most popular songs in the Spanish language, with dozens of covers like those of Gilda and Vicentico.

In 1993 his LP La Ley del Alma (y de la piel), containing the Spanish versions of his songs, reached the 13th position in the USA Billboard Hit Parade, first LP of the parade not sung in English[4].

From 2008 to 2011 he gave singing lessons at "Star Rose Academy" in Rome where he taught to sister Cristina Scuccia, the winner of The Voice of Italy 2014.

In 2011 he won the Globo d'oro for Best Song for the song "Accanto" included in the film Native.

In 2013-2014 he composed the symphonic-rock opera Stabat Mater (on the 13th century Latin text by Jacopone da Todi) sung together with the rocker Michele Cortese end the Anglo-Italian tenor Gianluca Paganelli.

In 2015 his song "Per fortuna" ("Por Suerte" in Spanish), sung by Michele Cortese, won the 56th edition of the Chilean Festival of Viña del Mar.

In 2018 he wrote and sang the song "Ballando sul prato" in a duet with Rita Pavone and in 2020 he wrote and sang the song "Come gira il mondo" in a duet with Paolo Belli.

In 2020 he began his collaboration with Andrea Morricone, with whom he wrote two songs ("Azzurri gli oceani" and "Cambia la città") included in the album Franco è il nome (first of a trilogy), released in 2021. That album also contains new arrangements by Alex Zuccaro of Simone hits "Respiro", "Cara droga", "A quest'ora", "Tentazione", "Gocce", "Tu per me", a cover of Lucio Dalla's "Caruso" and the translation of "Hello" ("Solo se mi vuoi") by Lionel Richie, together with the duets with Rita Pavone and Paolo Belli, and other unpublished pieces, including those sung in duet with Cinzia Marzo (by Officina Zoè) and with Zeta (Benedetta Zuccaro).

In 2022 he celebrated his 50 years of career with the nomination of Mario Draghi as Cavaliere della Repubblica, a triumphal tour in Chile and the release of a new album, Simone è il cognome (second in the trilogy), which contains, in addition to his successes ("Paesaggio", "La casa in via del Campo", "Ritratto", "Capitano", "L'infinito tra le dita", "Sogno della galleria", "Sono nato cantando", "Notte di San Lorenzo" and "Totò") rearranged by Alex Zuccaro, covers of "Povera patria" by Franco Battiato and Mina's "L'ultima occasione" and other new songs such as "Figlia, acqua e luce", and duets with Paola Arnesano and Antonio Amato.

In 2025, he released the third and final album of the trilogy, Francesco Luigi Simone all'anagrafe, with rearranged versions of his classics such as "Tu... e così sia," "Fiume grande," "La chiave" (a duet with Mariella Nava), "Il vecchio del carrozzone," and "A Marilyn," as well as new songs such as "Portobello" (dedicated to Enzo Tortora), "Callas" (a duet with soprano Rita Cammarano), "Il senso di un minuto" (a duet with Danilo Kakuen), "Pianeti" (a duet with Nando Popu of Sud Sound System), "Luna blu," "Pater" (the Pater Noster in Latin), and covers such as "Malafemmena" by Totò and "Il cielo in una stanza" by Gino Paoli.

In January 2026 he released the double vinyl album Dio, come amo queste canzoni (God, how I love these songs), which contains covers of "Ci vuole il mare" by Marco Masini, "Solamente tù" (Spanish translation of "Io amo") by Fausto Leali, "Le tasche piene di sassi" by Jovanotti, Nature Boy by Nat King Cole, Dio come ti amo and the Spanish translation "Dios, como te amo" by Domenico Modugno, "La mia storia tra le dita" by Gianluca Grignani, "Sognando" by Don Backy, "La Chanson des vieux amants" by Jacques Brel, "Notturno" by Riccardo Cocciante, "Perdere l'Amore" by Massimo Ranieri, "Canzone per te" by Sergio Endrigo, "Sogna, ragazzo, sogna" by Roberto Vecchioni, "'Na sera 'e maggio" by Roberto Murolo, "Spalle al muro" by Mariella Nava.

== Discography ==
- 1972 - Se di mezzo c'è l'amore (Ri-Fi, RDZ-ST S 14226)
- 1974 - La notte mi vuole bene (Ri-Fi, RDZ-ST S 14240)
- 1976 - Il poeta con la chitarra (Ri-Fi, RDZ-ST S 14274)
- 1977 - Respiro (Ri-Fi, RDZ-ST S 14287)
- 1978 - Paesaggio (Ri-Fi, RDZ-ST S 14300)
- 1979 - Franco Simone (Franco Simone & C. / WEA, FS 9001)
- 1980 - Racconto a due colori (Franco Simone & C. / WEA, FS 9002)
- 1982 - Gente che conosco (Franco Simone & C. / WEA, FS 9004)
- 1984 - Camper (SGM, 91001)
- 1986 - Il pazzo, lo zingaro ed altri amici (Targa, TAL 1413)
- 1989 - Totò (Skizzo / Fonit Cetra, LPX 233)
- 1990 - Vocepiano - dizionario dei sentimenti (Skizzo - Discomagic, LP 486)
- 1995 - Venti d'amore (2 inediti) (Nibbio / Skizzo - Fonit Cetra, CDL 391)
- 1996 - Una storia lunga una canzone (Nibbio / Skizzo - Fonit Cetra, CDL 410)
- 1998 - Notturno fiorentino (Nibbio / Skizzo - RTI, CNT 21132)
- 2001 - Eliopolis - La città del sole (Segnali Caotici, 253750053-2)(with the Great Balkanic Orchestra of Nikos Papakostas)
- 2003 - Dizionario (rosso) dei sentimenti - VocEpiano (Azzurra, DA1012) (+ DVD)
- 2010 - Nato tra due mari (CD La musica del mare + DVD Le parole del mare - Skizzo distribuzione Self, ICEBOX 10/05)
- 2011 - C'era il sole ed anche il vento... - Skizzo distribuzione Self, ICEBOX 10/06
- 2011 - La musica del mare (reprint of the CD "La musica del mare" of the CD box "Nato tra due mari" in 2010 with bonus track "Accanto" winner of the Golden Globe 2011 for the best film song (Skizzo distribuzione Self, ICEBOX 10/07)
- 2014 - Stabat Mater, symphonic rock opera (Latin text by Jacopone da Todi) featuring Michele Cortese e Gianluca Paganelli, special guest Rita Cammarano
- 2016 - Carissimo Luigi (Franco Simone canta Luigi Tenco)
- 2018 - Per fortuna (Compilation) “Per fortuna” vincitrice “Festival di Viña del mar” 2015 miglior canzone internazionale.
- 2021 - Franco è il nome (Skizzo Edizioni Musicali)
- 2022 - Simone è il cognome (Skizzo Edizioni Musicali)
- 2025 - Francesco Luigi Simone all'anagrafe (Skizzo Edizioni Musicali)
- 2026 - Dio, come amo queste canzoni (Skizzo Edizioni Musicali)

== Bibliography ==
- Stasi, Carlo (2016). Sono nato cantando... tra due mari (radici e canto nella poetica di Franco Simone, cantautore salentino). Sannicola: iQuadernidelBardo. pp. 71. ISBN 9788899763084.
- Stasi, Carlo (2018). Dizionario Enciclopedico dei Salentini, Grifo, Vol. II, pp. 1002-1004. ISBN 978-88-6994-172-6
