= Io che amo solo te =

Single by Sergio Endrigo

from the album Sergio Endrigo
- B-side: "Vecchia Balera"
- Released: 1962
- Genre: Pop
- Label: RCA
- Songwriter(s): Sergio Endrigo

Sergio Endrigo singles chronology
"Ave Maria" (1962)	"Io che amo solo te" (1962)	"Se le cose stanno così" (1963)

"Io che amo solo te" (Italian pronunciation: [ˈiːo ke ˈaːmo ˈsoːlo ˈte]; i.e. "I who love only you") is a song composed and performed by Sergio Endrigo and arranged by Luis Bacalov. One of Endrigo's major hits, the song was released in the summer of 1962 but became a success only at the end of year, eventually peaking at the second place on the Italian hit parade and selling over 650,000 copies.

According to Endrigo, the song was inspired by his love for a secretary and both music and lyrics were composed in about twenty minutes. A hymn to pure love and to absolute fidelity, in 1974 the song was used by the "Vote Yes" Committee for the Italian divorce referendum.

The song was later covered by several artists, including Mina, Ornella Vanoni, Gianna Nannini, Rita Pavone, Massimo Ranieri, Nicola Di Bari, Franco Simone, Marco Mengoni, Claudio Baglioni, Fiorella Mannoia and Fabio Concato. It also named a 2015 film, Io che amo solo te, where the song was covered by Alessandra Amoroso.

== Charts ==
Chart (1962–1964)	Peak position
Brazil (IBOPE)	1
Italy (Musica e dischi)	8

== Track listing ==
- 7" single – PM45 - 3098
1. "Io che amo solo te" (Sergio Endrigo)
2. "Vecchia Balera" (Sergio Endrigo)
