= Speroni =

Speroni is an Italian surname. Notable people with the surname include:

- Carlo Speroni (1895–1969), Italian runner
- Francesco Speroni (born 1946), Italian politician
- Julián Speroni (born 1979), Argentinian footballer
- Remo Speroni (1938–2010), stage name Remo Germani, Italian singer
- Sperone Speroni (1500–1588), Italian humanist playwright
