= Un bacio piccolissimo =

Single by Robertino
- B-side: "Se saprai"
- Released: 1964
- Genre: Pop
- Label: Carosello
- Songwriter(s): Giovanni Ornati, Gino Mescoli

Robertino singles chronology
"Luna rossa" (1963)	"Un bacio piccolissimo" (1964)	"Piccolo piccolo" (1964)

Audio
- "Un bacio piccolissimo" on YouTube

"Un bacio piccolissimo" is a 1964 song composed by Giovanni Ornati and Gino Mescoli. The song premiered at the 14th edition of the Sanremo Music Festival with a double performance of Robertino and Bobby Rydell. Robertino's version was sung with a fake English accent according to the fashion of the time.

Both Robertino's and Rydell's versions were successful, respectively ranking #4 and #9 on the Italian hit parade.

The song was later recorded also in Spanish (with the title "Un beso pequeñísimo") and in German (with the title "Heute Abend lass die Uhr zu Haus"). In 2013 thecomedy music group Elio e le Storie Tese, with the participation as spoken voice of adult actor Rocco Siffredi, presented a new version of the song at the 63rd edition of the Sanremo Music Festival.

== Track listing ==
7" single – CI 20103

1. "Un bacio piccolissimo" (Giovanni Ornati, Gino Mescoli)
2. "Se saprai" (Giuseppe Paiocchi, Gino Mescoli, Vito Pallavicini)

== Charts ==
Chart	Peak position
Italy	4
