= Adesso sì =

Single by Sergio Endrigo

from the album Endrigo
- B-side: "Io e la mia chitarra"
- Released: 1966
- Genre: Pop
- Label: Fonit Cetra
- Songwriter: Sergio Endrigo

Sergio Endrigo singles chronology
"Teresa" (1965)	"Adesso sì" (1966)	"Girotondo intorno al mondo" (1966)

"Adesso sì" is a 1966 Italian song composed by Sergio Endrigo. The song premiered at the 16th edition of the Sanremo Music Festival, with a double performance by Endrigo and Chad & Jeremy, and placed eight in the competition.

Endrigo's version peaked No. 9 on the Italian singles chart.

The song also has the distinction of being the first song recorded by Lucio Battisti and for being, together with "Prigioniero del mondo" and "La compagnia", one of the only three songs he performed during his career which he did not compose himself.

== Track listing ==
=== Sergio Endrigo version ===
- 7" single – SP 1297
1. "Adesso sì" (Sergio Endrigo)
2. "Io e la mia chitarra" (Sergio Endrigo)

=== Chad & Jeremy version ===
- 7" single – CBS 2163
1. "Adesso sì" (Sergio Endrigo)
2. "Nessuno più di me" (Gianni Marchetti, Stratta)

== Charts ==
Chart	Peak position
Italy	9
