= Luciana Turina =

Italian singer, actress, and television personality

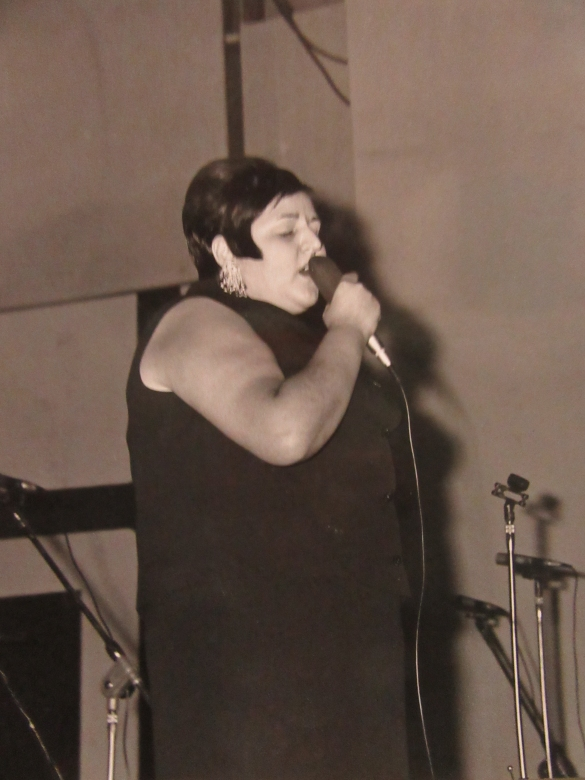
- Turina performing in Salsomaggiore Terme in the 1960s
- Born: 13 August 1946 (age 80); Malavicina di Roverbella, Mantua, Italy
- Occupations: Singer; actress
- Partner: Emerico Lino

Luciana Turina (born 13 August 1946) is an Italian singer, actress and television personality.

== Life and career ==
Born in the Malavicina frazione (borough) of Roverbella, Province of Mantua, Turina started her professional career as singer in 1965, participating at the Castrocaro Music Festival and winning the competition with the song "Come ti vorrei". One year later, she entered the main competition at the Sanremo Music Festival, with the song "Dipendesse da me". In 1969 she made her film debut in Pietro Germi's Serafino and from then she focused her career on acting, mainly playing comedic roles. Her variegated career also includes television variety shows, cabaret and several books.

== Discography ==
=== LP ===
- 1972 – Perché qualcuno un giorno mi ha dato la vita e... una voce (Cinevox, SC 1074)

=== EP ===
- 1966 – Dio come ti amo/Dependes de mi/La carta vincente/Nadia me puede juzgar (Compagnia Generale del Disco, HG 77–40; with Gigliola Cinquetti, Gino Paoli and Caterina Caselli; published in Spain)

=== Songs ===
- 1965 – Sei il mio male/Come ti vorrei (CGD, N 9600)
- 1966 – Dipendesse da me/L'amore è una giostra (Compagnia Generale del Disco, N 9604)
- 1966 – Depende de mi/L'amore è una giostra (Music-Hall, 30.524; pubblicato in Argentina)
- 1966 – Non prendere la vita così com'è/Un ragazzo che ride (Compagnia Generale del Disco, N 9625)
- 1966 – Il mio male/Non prendere la vita così com'è (Compagnia Generale del Disco, N 9634)
- 1968 – Imogene/Notte senza fine (RCA Talent, TL1)
- 1971 – Fratello ladro/Ma perché (Cinevox, SC 1069)
- 1972 – Djamballà (il mio tempo arriverà)/Cena per due (Cinevox, SC 1074)
- 1977 – Water closet/Arancione (Mia Records, M 1513)
- 1983 – Hey mamma/Brr...che freddo (Strong Records, SR 106)
- 2017 – Terra

=== Participations ===
- 1981 – La storia vera della signora dalle camelie with Petite Creature
- 2001 – Come nelle favole with Musica è
