= Patricia Carli =

Italian-French singer

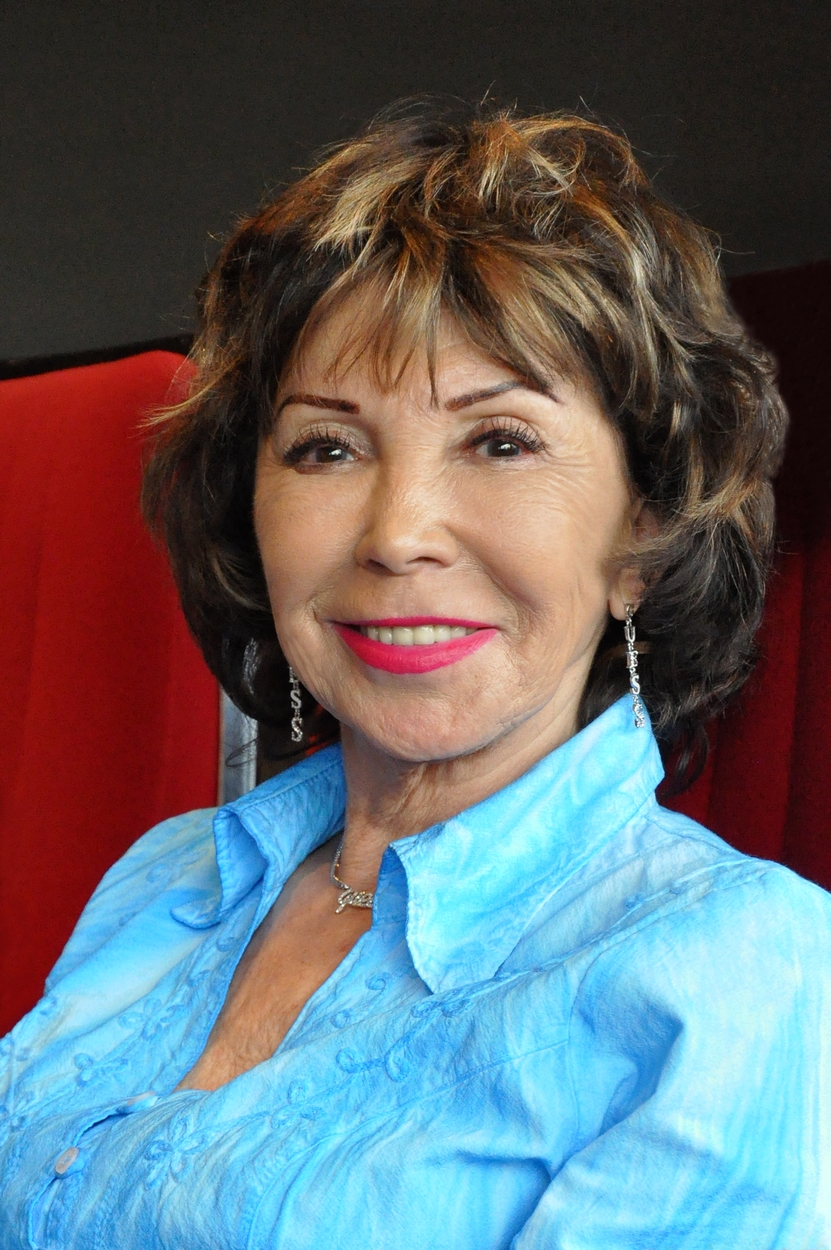
- Carli in 2013

Background information
- Born: Rosetta Ardito; 12 March 1938 (age 88); Taranto, Kingdom of Italy
- Origin: Italy; Belgium; France
- Genres: Pop; italo disco
- Occupations: Singer; composer
- Years active: 1963–present
- Labels: Bel Air; Riviera

Rosetta Ardito (born 12 March 1938), known by her stage name Patricia Carli, is an Italian and Belgian origin French singer, songwriter, lyricist and composer.

== Life and career ==
Born in Taranto, Italy, Carli grew up in Belgium, where her parents had emigrated for work. After studying music and singing, she began performing in public and in a few years she became well known in Belgium and in France, where she performed at the prestigious Olympia music hall in Paris.

In partnership with Gigliola Cinquetti she won the 1964 edition of the Sanremo Music Festival, with the song "Non ho l'età".

== Partial discography ==
=== 45 rpm ===
- 1964: "Non ho l'età / Così felice" (Bel Air, ba 11001)
- 1966: "Il male che fai / Un giorno a te ritornerà" (Riviera, RIV 514)

Preceded by Tony Renis / Emilio Pericoli	Winner of the Sanremo Music Festival; Gigliola Cinquetti / Patricia Carli; 1964	Succeeded by Bobby Solo/ New Christy Minstrels
