= Presicce-Acquarica =

- Comune
- Comune di Presicce-Acquarica
- Location within Italy Location within Apulia
- Coordinates: 39°54′29″N 18°15′2″E
- Country: Italy
- Region: Apulia
- Province: Lecce (LE)

Government
  - Mayor: Claudio Sergi

Area
  - Total: 43.06 km^{2} (16.63 sq mi)

Population (31 December 2017)
  - Total: 10,487
  - Density: 243.5/km^{2} (630.8/sq mi)
- Demonym(s): presiccesi, acquaricesi
- Time zone: UTC+1 (CET)
  - Summer (DST): UTC+2 (CEST)
- Dialing code: 0833

Presicce-Acquarica is a comune (municipality) in the Province of Lecce in the Italian region Apulia.

It was established on 15 May 2019 by the merger of the municipalities of Presicce and Acquarica del Capo.

Presicce-Acquarica is a municipality of 9.335 inhabitants, a population density of 217 people per km² and an altitude of 104 metres above the sea level.
