= Presicce =

- Comune
- Comune di Presicce
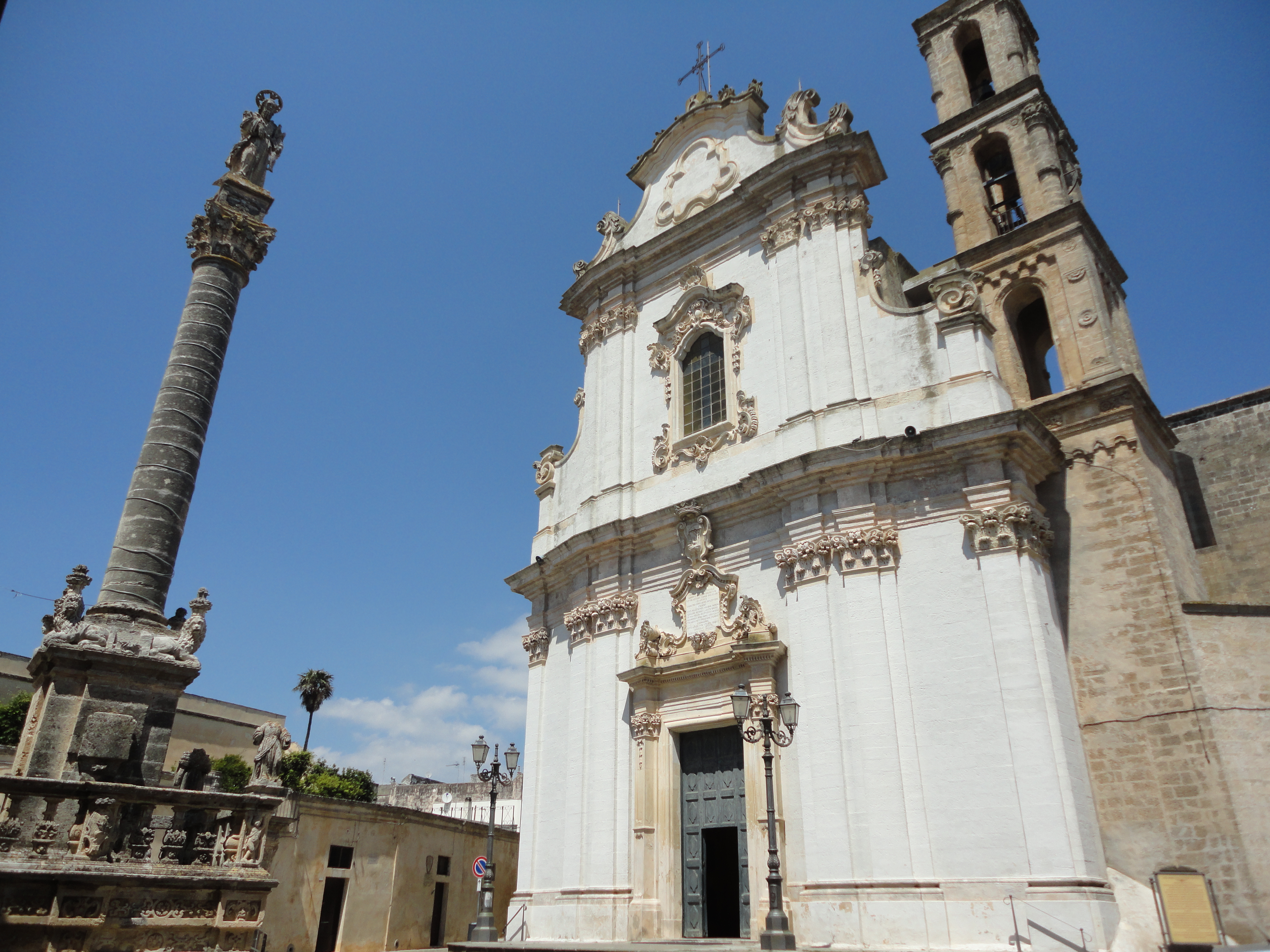

- Location within Italy Location within Apulia
- Coordinates: 39°54′05″N 18°15′46″E
- Country: Italy
- Region: Apulia
- Province: Lecce (LE)

Government
  - Mayor: Salvatore Riccardo Monsellato

Area
  - Total: 24.36 km^{2} (9.41 sq mi)
- Elevation: 104 m (341 ft)

Population (30 November 2017)
  - Total: 5,289
  - Density: 217.1/km^{2} (562.3/sq mi)
- Demonym: Presiccesi
- Time zone: UTC+1 (CET)
  - Summer (DST): UTC+2 (CEST)
- Postal code: 73054
- Dialing code: 0833
- Patron saint: St. Andrew the Apostle
- Saint day: 30 November
- Website: Official website

Presicce was a town and comune in the Italian province of Lecce in the Apulia region of south-east Italy. It is one of I Borghi più belli d'Italia ("The most beautiful villages of Italy"). In 2019 it was merged with the adjacent Acquarica del Capo to form Presicce-Acquarica.

In 2022, facing a declining population, the town launched the program to reverse the trend and revitalize the town by offering €30,000 to people who are willing to purchase an empty structure and relocate to the old quarter.

== Main sights ==
- Ducal Palace, built by the Normans, perhaps on a pre-existing Byzantine structure
- Church of Sant'Andrea Apostolo
- Church of the Carmine and convent (mid-16th century)
- Casa Turrita (16th century), an example of noble residence including a defensive tower.

== Culture ==
Presicce appears in the 2014 British musical film, Walking on Sunshine.
