= Goichi =

- Gender: Male

Origin
- Origin: Japanese
- Meaning: Different meanings depending on the kanji used

Goichi (written: 剛一 or 吾一) is a masculine Japanese given name. Notable people with the name include:

- Goichi Ishitani (石谷 吾一) (born 1979), Japanese footballer
- Goichi Oya, Imperial Japanese Navy officer
- Goichi Suda (須田 剛一) (born 1968), Japanese video game designer
