= Wilma Goich =

Italian recording artist, pop singer

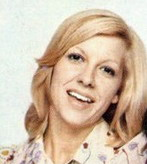
- Goich in 1972
- Born: 16 October 1945 (age 80); Cairo Montenotte, Savona, Kingdom of Italy
- Occupations: Singer, television personality
- Spouse: Edoardo Vianello (m. 1967; div. 1981)
- Children: 1

Wilma Goich (Italian pronunciation: [ˈvilma ˈɡɔitʃ]; born 16 October 1945) is an Italian pop singer and television personality.

== Early life and career ==
Born in Cairo Montenotte to Dalmatian Italian parents from Zadar, Goich began her career in 1964, when she released her first single "Dopo il sole pioverà". She entered the Sanremo Music Festival five times during the 1960s: in 1965, 1966, 1967, 1968 and 1969, scoring two domestic hits with her 1966 and 1968 entries "In un fiore" and "Gli occhi miei", which peaked respectively at sixth and seventh place on the Italian charts. Between 1971 and 1979, Goich formed with her then-husband Edoardo Vianello the folk-pop duo Vianella.

In 1991, Goich joined Mike Bongiorno as a presenter of the Canale 5 quiz show Tris. She participated in the Sanremo Music Festival one last time in 1994. In 2022 to 2023, she was a contestant in season 7 of Grande Fratello VIP (the Italian version of Celebrity Big Brother).

== Personal life ==
Goich considers herself Roman Catholic. She was married to Edoardo Vianello between 1967 and 1981. They had a daughter: Susanna (1970-2020)
