= Una lacrima sul viso =

Single by Bobby Solo

from the album Bobby Solo
- B-side: "Non Ne Posso Più"
- Released: February 1964
- Genre: Pop
- Label: Ricordi
- Songwriters: Lunero and Mogol

Bobby Solo singles chronology
"Blu è blu" (1963)	"Una lacrima sul viso" (1964)	"Credi a me" (1964)

"Una lacrima sul viso" (Italian for A Tear on your Face) is a song composed by Lunero and Mogol and performed by Bobby Solo. The song premiered at the fourteenth Sanremo Music Festival, with a double performance by Solo and Frankie Laine, who proposed an English version of the song with the title "For Your Love". The song entered the final, but Solo was affected by laryngitis. Unable to sing live, he sang with playback, being subsequently disqualified.

The single peaked at first place for nine consecutive weeks on the Italian hit parade. It sold over three million copies worldwide, and it was awarded a gold disc.

== Charts ==
Weekly chart performance for "Una lacrima sul viso"
Chart (1964)	Peak position
Belgium (Ultratop 50 Flanders)	13
Belgium (Ultratop 50 Wallonia)	2
Brazil (IBOPE)	2
Italy (Musica e dischi)	1
Netherlands (Dutch Top 40)	34
Uruguay (CUD)	7

== Sales ==
Sales for "Una lacrima sul viso"
Region	Sales
France	250,000
Italy	1,700,000
Worldwide	3,000,000

== Track listing ==
- 7" single – SRL 10-338
1. "Una lacrima sul viso" (Lunero, Mogol)
2. "Non ne posso più" (Giorgio Salvioni, Iller Pattacini)

== Covers ==
Besides the famous cover by Frankie Laine (single) as "For Your Love" (CBS, 1332), the song was covered by several artists, notably Achille Togliani, Claude Challe, Richard Clayderman, Franck Pourcel and Francis Goya.

== In other media ==
A musicarello film titled Una lacrima sul viso was released, starring Solo and Laura Efrikian, and directed by Ettore Maria Fizzarotti. It also was distributed under the title Tears on Your Face.

The song was used in several other films as well, notably Whit Stillman's Barcelona, Xavier Giannoli's When I Was a Singer, and François Ozon's 5x2.
