= Acquarica del Capo =

- Comune
- Comune di Acquarica del Capo
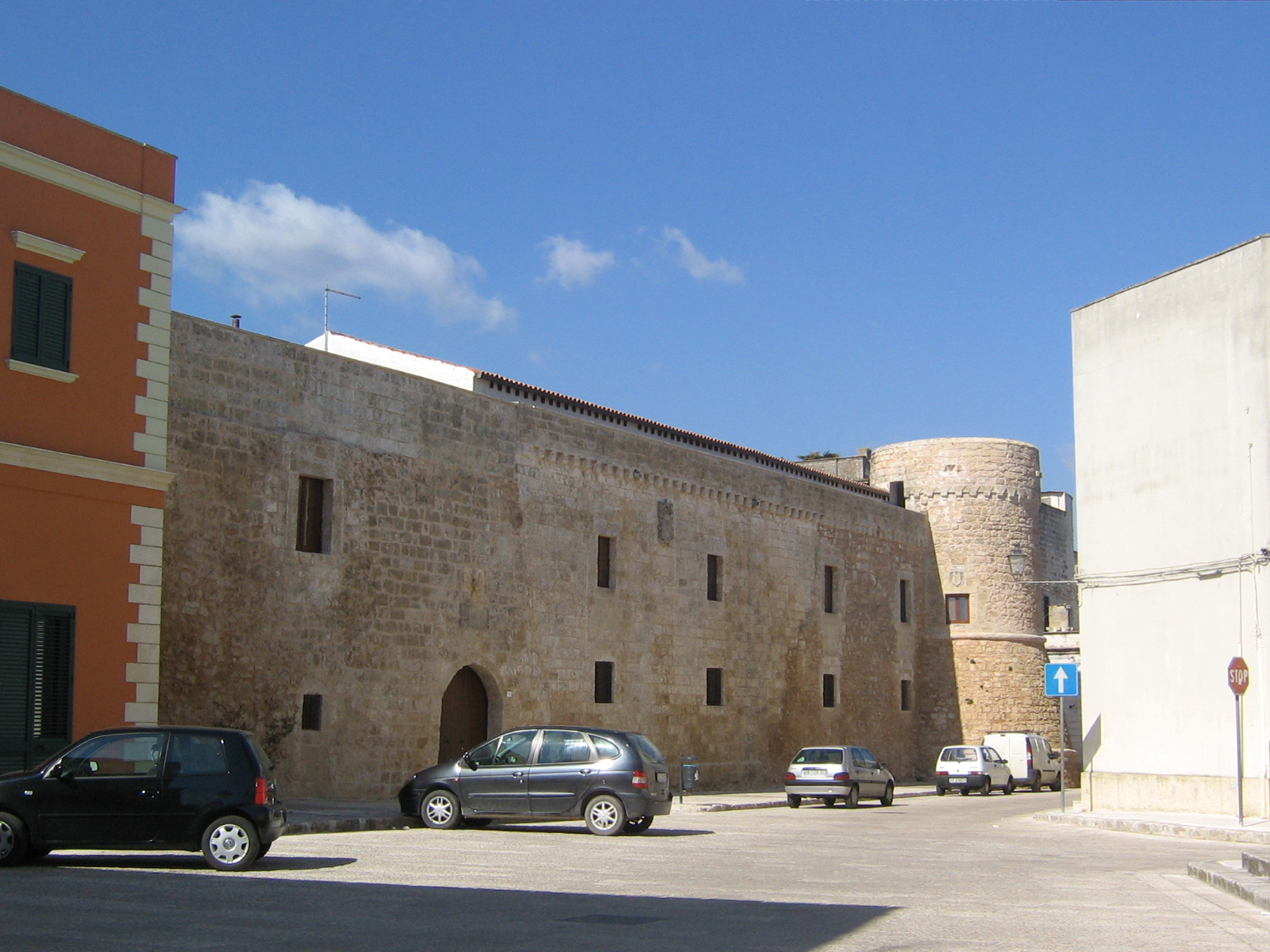
- Medieval castle

- Coat of arms

- Location of Acquarica del Capo in Italy Acquarica del Capo (Apulia)
- Coordinates: E39°54′46″N 18°14′46″E
- Country: Italy
- Region: Apulia
- Province: Lecce (LE)

Government
  - Mayor: Francesco Ferraro

Area
  - Total: 18.7 km^{2} (7.2 sq mi)
- Elevation: 110 m (360 ft)

Population (30 April 2017)
  - Total: 4,710
  - Density: 252/km^{2} (652/sq mi)
- Demonym: Acquaricesi
- Time zone: UTC+1 (CET)
  - Summer (DST): UTC+2 (CEST)
- Postal code: 73040
- Dialing code: 0833
- ISTAT code: 075001
- Patron saint: St. Charles Borromeo
- Saint day: November 4
- Website: Official website

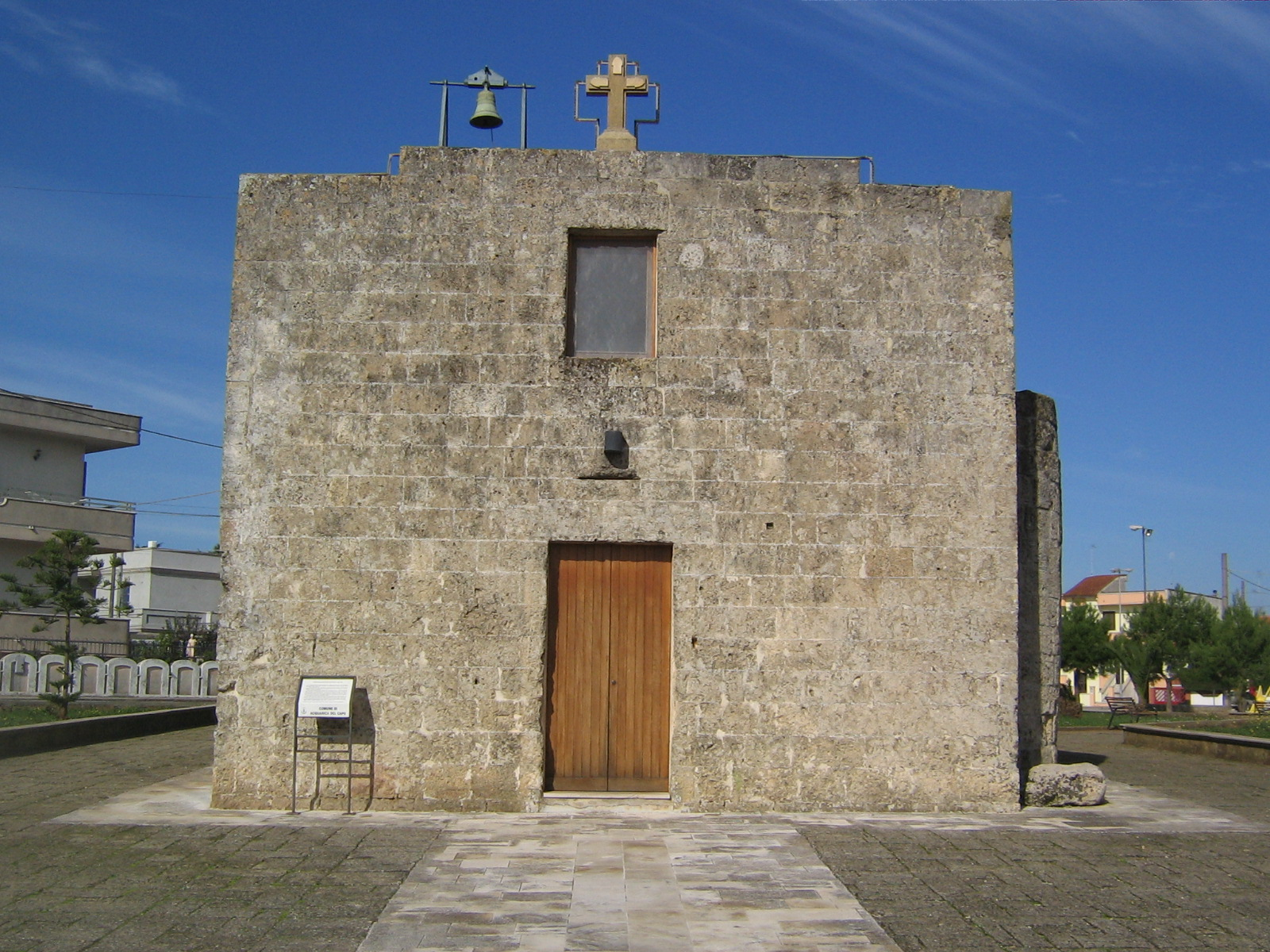
Church of Madonna dei Panetti.

Acquarica del Capo was a town and comune in the province of Lecce, Apulia, south-eastern Italy. In 2019 it was merged with the adjacent Presicce to form Presicce-Acquarica.

It is located in Salento, 10 km from the Ionian Sea and 60 km from Lecce. Its origins are medieval and it grew around a Norman fortification. Later it was transformed into a castle town by the Aragonese.

== Main sights ==
- Medieval castle. It was probably a Norman fortification around which the village developed in the Middle Ages and was later transformed in a Castle in the 14th century by Giovanni Antonio Orsini Del Balzo, Prince of Taranto. Only a round tower remains from the original four. In the court can be seen the so-called "Pila di Pompignano" saved from destruction in 1982 by the local writer Carlo Stasi who wrote its legend.
- Church of San Carlo Borromeo
- Church of San Giovanni Battista
- Church Madonna dei Panetti, at Celsorizzo, one of the most ancient constructions in the lower Salento.
- Fortified masseria of Celsorizzo. A huge Norman Tower with Byzantine frescoes in the Chapel at its base.
- Church of Madonna di Pompignano
