= Giuliana Lojodice =

Italian actress (born 1940)

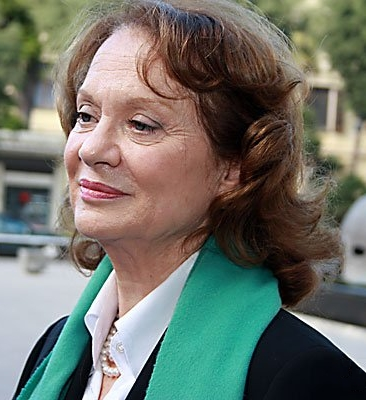
- Lojodice in 2008
- Born: 12 August 1940 (age 85); Bari, Kingdom of Italy
- Occupation: Actress
- Years active: 1960–2018
- Spouses: Mario Chiocchio (m. 1960, divorced) Aroldo Tieri (m. 1989; died 2006)
- Children: 2

Giuliana Lojodice (Italian pronunciation: [loˈjoːditʃe]; born 12 August 1940) is an Italian stage, television and film actress.

== Life and career ==
Born in Bari, at seven years old Lojodice moved to Rome with her parents and her three brothers, when her father, a lawyer, was appointed general manager of the public company INAIL. At fourteen years old she started doing acting auditions, and in 1955 she made her acting debut, chosen by Luchino Visconti for a minor role in the stage play Il crogiuolo. At 16 years old Lojodice enrolled the Accademia Nazionale di Arte Drammatica Silvio D'Amico without finishing the course. In 1958 she debuted in a main role, replacing Monica Vitti (who had contrasts with the director Giacomo Vaccari) in the TV-drama L'imbroglio.

After a sentimental relationship with actor-director Leopoldo Trieste and a failed marriage with stage actor Mario Chiocchio, in the mid-1960s she started with her then husband Aroldo Tieri a long professional and sentimental relationship which lasted until his death in 2006.

Active in cinema, theatre, television, radio, fotoromanzi and commercials, Lojodice is also a very active voice actress and dubber; she was the narrator voice during the 2004 tour Cattura il sogno by Renato Zero. She also hosted the 1964 edition of the Sanremo Music Festival together with Mike Bongiorno.

Her sister Leda is a choreographer who worked with Federico Fellini. She has two children from her first marriage. She considers herself Roman Catholic.
