= Bruno Filippini =

Italian singer (1945–2023)

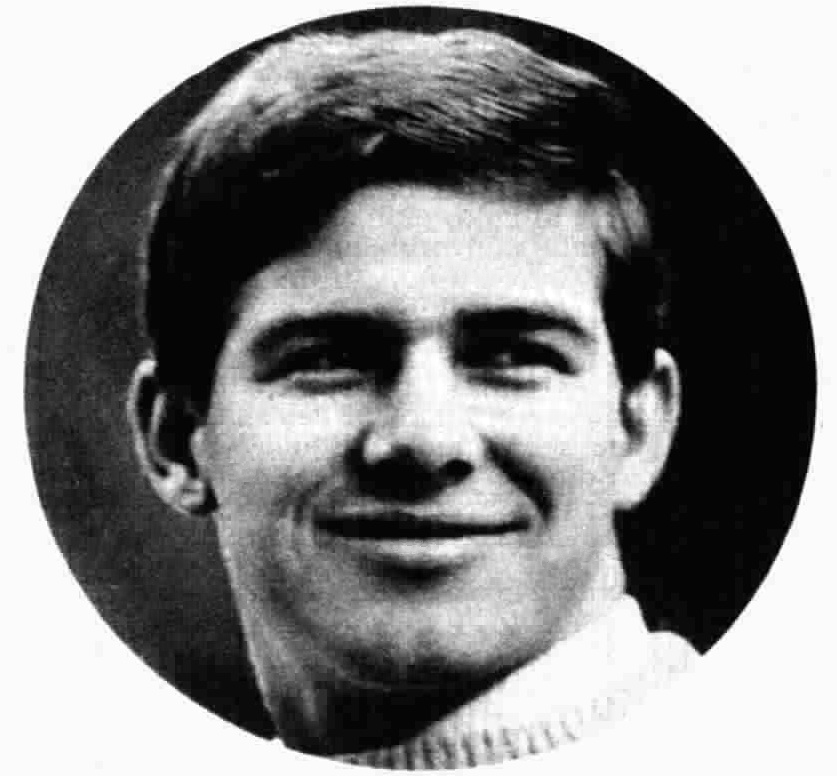
- Filippini in 1964
- Born: 3 March 1945; Rome, Kingdom of Italy
- Died: 5 October 2023 (aged 78); Rome, Italy
- Occupation: Singer

Bruno Filippini (3 March 1945 – 5 October 2023) was an Italian singer, mainly successful in the 1960s.

== Life and career ==
Born in Rome, after graduating from a Technical-Commercial school, Filippini studied music and chant and later entered the Sistine Chapel Choir. In 1963, he won the Castrocaro Music Festival, and in 1964, he entered the competition at the Sanremo Music Festival with the song "Sabato sera", which was also a moderate success on the Italian hit parade. The same year he also participated at Un disco per l'estate and at the Festival di Napoli.

In 1965, Filippini returned to the Sanremo Music Festival, becoming successful with the song "L'amore ha i tuoi occhi". In the second half of the 1960s, he also had some occasional experiences as a composer and as a film actor. In 1968, he was invited by Franco Zeffirelli to perform the song "Canzone d'amore/Ai giochi addio" in the Italian release of his Romeo and Juliet film and lip-sync the English version "What is a Youth", which was voiced by Glen Weston in the English-language release. When his success declined in the 1970s, he focused on live performances in piano bars and music halls, as well as appearances on several revival television programmes.

== Death ==
Filippini died aged 78, in Rome, Italy, on 5 October 2023.

== Discography ==
Singles

- 1963 – La ragazza nell'acqua/L'anno venturo (MRC A200)
- 1964 – Sabato sera/Bimba ricordati (MRC A203)
- 1964 – Non ho il coraggio/Ti voglio ancora bene (MRC A206)
- 1964 – Ho paura dell'amore/Non ho bisogno di te (MRC A208)
- 1964 – Ammore siente/Maria Carmela ela...ela (MRC A209)
- 1965 – L'amore ha i tuoi occhi/Fortunatamente (MRC A212)
- 1965 – Quando il sole cadrà/È inutile piangere (MRC A222)
- 1965 – Lasciatemi qui/Noi saremo insieme (MRC A226)
- 1968 – La felicità/Un piccolo aiuto dagli amici (RCA Italiana PM 3450)
- 1968 – Canzone d'amore/Hip, hip, hip, hurrah! (RCA Italiana PM 3472)
- 1971 – Pace e bene/Un collare d'argento (King NSP 56122)

Album

- 1999 – Il meglio (DV More Record)

== Filmography ==
Year	Title	Role	Notes
1964	Canzoni, bulli e pupe		
1964	I ragazzi dell'hully-gully	Himself	
1967	The Witches	Singer	(segment "Strega Bruciata Viva, La")
1968	Romeo and Juliet	Leonardo	Uncredited, (final film role)
