= Peppino Gagliardi =

Italian singer (1940–2023)

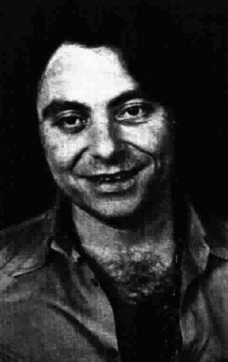
- Gagliardi in 1975

Background information
- Born: 25 May 1940; Naples, Kingdom of Italy
- Origin: Arzano, Italy
- Died: 9 August 2023 (aged 83) Rome, Italy
- Occupation: Singer

Peppino Gagliardi (25 May 1940 – 9 August 2023) was an Italian singer who was best known for his musical hits titled "Che vuole questa musica stasera" and "Come le viole" which have been featured in many films and have remained popular in Italy. His music remains popular throughout Italy, most notably in Rome.

== Biography ==
Peppino Gagliardi was born in Naples on 25 May 1940. His first hit in Italy came in 1963 with "T'amo e t'amerò". In 1970, he had another big hit with the song "Settembre" and more hits followed in the early 1970s.

Gagliardi achieved two second placings at the Sanremo Music Festival: in 1972 with "Come le viole" and in 1973 with "Come un ragazzino". His music declined in popularity in the 1980s and 1990s. His last entry at the Sanremo Music Festival was "L'alba" in 1993.

One of his songs, "Che vuole questa musica stasera", is part of the original soundtrack of Scent of a Woman by Dino Risi, The Man from U.N.C.L.E. by Guy Ritchie, The Ruthless by Renato De Maria, and Welcome Home by George Ratliff. The song was also used in an episode of Season 2 of the Belgian series Professor T.

On 18 September 2010 Mayor Giuseppe Antonio Fuschino awarded Gagliardi honorary citizenship of the municipality of Arzano, the city where his career began. That same evening he held a concert.

In 2012, Gagliardi returned with an experimental single in Neapolitan dialect, written and self-produced with Massimilliano Gagliardi titled "A ballata r'ettre scigne".

On 16 March 2022, the 130th anniversary of the newspaper Il mattino, he (along with other Neapolitan artists) recorded a greeting video that was published onto the newspaper's website.

== Illness and death ==
It had been rumored that Gagliardi had been suffering from an unknown illness since 2020. He never publicly announced his illness however, fans believed he was suffering from cancer. On the evening of 9 August 2023, Gagliardi died at his home in Rome, nearly 3 months after his 83rd birthday. The cause of death was not disclosed however most speculate his mysterious chronic illness to be the cause. His funeral was held on 12 August at the Church of San Melchiade in the Labaro region of Rome.
