= Sergio Endrigo =

Italian singer-songwriter (1933–2005)

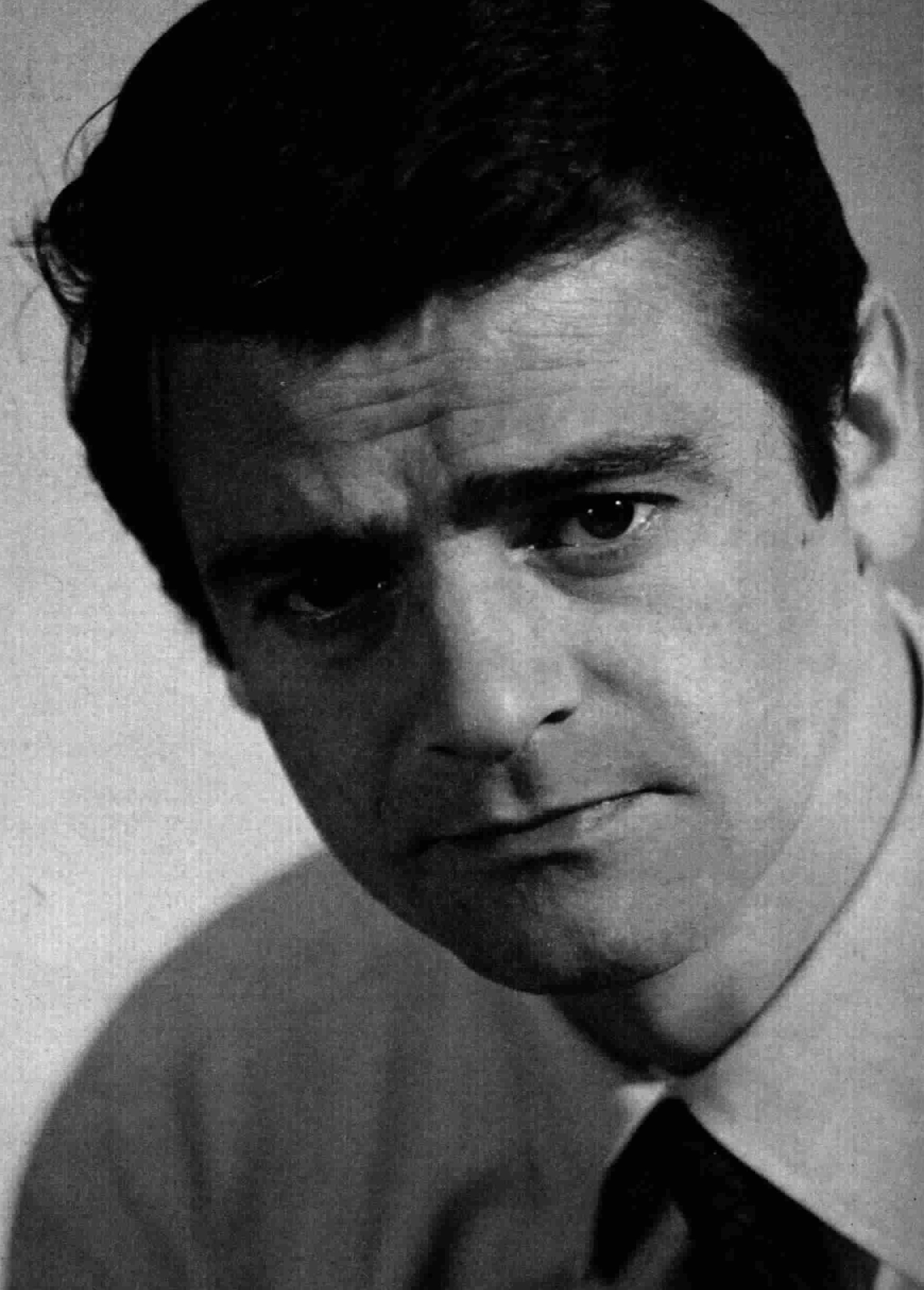
- Born: 15 June 1933; Pola, Kingdom of Italy
- Died: 7 September 2005 (aged 72); Rome, Italy

Sergio Endrigo (Italian pronunciation: [ˈsɛrdʒo enˈdriːɡo]; 15 June 1933 – 7 September 2005) was an Italian singer-songwriter.

Born in Pola, Istria in Italy (now Pula, Croatia), he has been often compared—for style and nature—to authors of the so-called "Genoa school" like Gino Paoli, Fabrizio De André, Luigi Tenco, and Bruno Lauzi.

He won the Sanremo Music Festival in 1968 with the song "Canzone per te", sung with Roberto Carlos. The same year he represented Italy at the Eurovision Song Contest 1968 with the song "Marianne." His hits also include "L'arca di Noè", "Io che amo solo te" and "Adesso sì".

== Discography ==
=== Albums ===
- 1962 – Sergio Endrigo
- 1963 – Endrigo
- 1966 – Endrigo
- 1968 – Endrigo
- 1969 – La vita, amico, è l'arte dell'incontro
- 1969 – I più grandi successi di Sergio Endrigo
- 1969 – Sergio Endrigo
- 1971 – Nuove canzoni d'amore
- 1972 – Diez Canciones De Amor
- 1972 – L'Arca
- 1973 – Elisa
- 1974 – La voce dell'uomo
- 1974 – Ci vuole un fiore
- 1975 – Endrigo dieci anni dopo
- 1976 – Canzoni venete
- 1976 – Alle origini della mafia
- 1977 – Sarebbe bello...
- 1978 – Donna mal d'Africa
- 1979 – Exclusivamente Brasil
- 1980 – A Arte de Sergio Endrigo
- 1980 – En Castellano
- 1981 – ...e noi amiamoci
- 1982 – Mari del sud
- 1982 – Se necessita una flor
- 1986 – E allora balliamo
- 1988 – Il giardino di Giovanni
- 1993 – Qualcosa di meglio
- 1996 – Il meglio
- 2003 – Altre emozioni
- 2004 – Cjantant Endrigo dut par furlan/Cantando Endrigo in lingua friulana
- 2010 – Si comincia a cantare

Singles

without Year
- E allora balliamo
- Il mondo
- La ballata dell'ex
- Nelle mie notti
- La canzone della libertà
1959
- Aiuto
- Arrivederci
- Avevamo la stessa età
- Ero un uomo tranquillo
- I Sing Ammore
- Labbra di fuoco
- Io sono il vento
- Venus
- Il tuo sorriso
- Non so cos'è
- Notte lunga notte
- Nuvola per due
- Ora che ho te (son felice di vivere)
- Patricia
- Piove
- Storia di un amore
- Tanta da morire
- Tu (non-devi farlo più)
- Tu sei quì
- Un'ora con te
1960
- I tuoi vent'anni
1961
- La brava gente

1962
- Aria di neve
- Basta così
- Io che amo solo te
- La periferia
- Vecchia balera
- Via Broletto 34
1963
- La rosa bianca
- Annamaria
- Era d'estate
- Se le cose stanno così
- Viva Maddalena
1964
- Ti amo
1965
- Come stasera mai
- Mani bucate
- Teresa
1966
- Adesso sì
- Girotondo intorno al mondo
- Io e la mia chitarra
1967
- Dove credi di andare
- Il treno che viene dal sud
- Perché non-dormi fratello
1968
- Canzone per te
- Il dolce paese
- Il primo bicchiere di vino
- La colomba
- Marianne

1969
- La casa
- Lontano dagli occhi
- San Firmino
1970
- Dall'America
- L'arca di Noé
1971
- La prima compagnia
- Una storia
- Quando ti lascio
1972
- Angiolina
1973
- Antiqua
- Elisa Elisa
1974
- Ci vuole un fiore
1976
- A Barbara
- Quando c'era il mare
1980
- Mille lire
1986
- Canzone italiana
- Le ragazze
2002
- La voce dell'uomo
- Spiaggia libera

Awards and achievements
Preceded by Claudio Villa & Iva Zanicchi with "Non pensare a me"	Sanremo Music Festival; Winner; 1968	Succeeded by Bobby Solo & Iva Zanicchi with "Zingara"
Preceded by Claudio Villa with "Non andare più lontano"	Italy in the Eurovision Song Contest; 1968	Succeeded by Iva Zanicchi with "Due grosse lacrime bianche"
