= Iller Pattacini =

Italian composer

Iller Pattacini (Barco, 7 October 1933 – Barco, 3 September 2006), was an Italian composer of pop music, arranger, band leader, and conductor. He worked as a house arranger for Ricordi and under the pen name Lunero penned songs such as Una lacrima sul viso, a success for Bobby Solo in 1964.

== Selected discography ==
As conductor

- Luigi Alva recital "Ay Ay Ay" conducting the New Symphony Orchestra of London Decca 1963
