= Les Surfs =

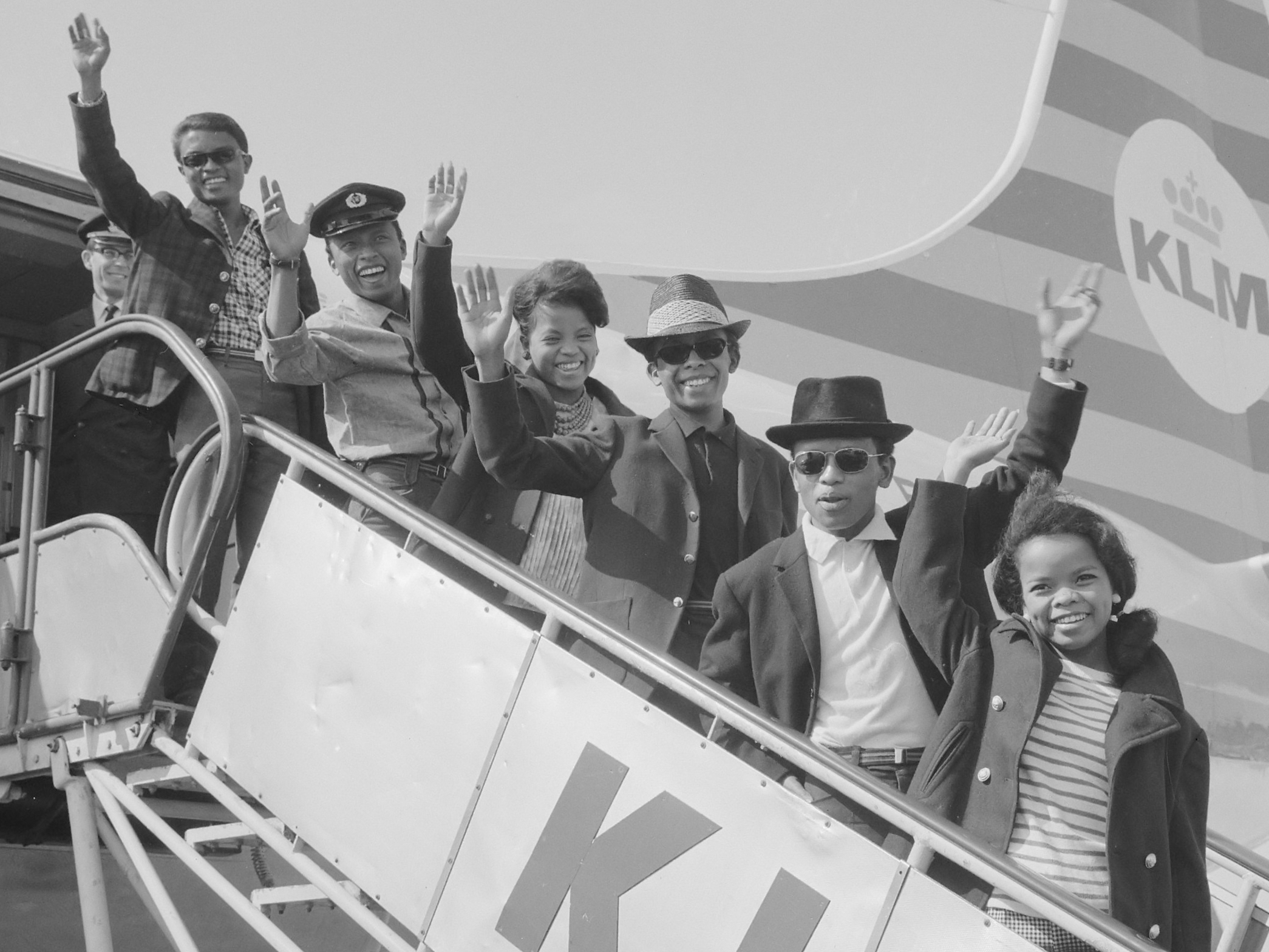
- Les Surfs (1964)

Background information
- Origin: Tananarive, Madagascar
- Genre: Pop rock
- Years active: 1963–1971
- Label: Festival Records (France)
- Past members: † Monique Rabaraona † Nicole Rabaraona; Coco Rabaraona; Pat Rabaraona; Rocky Rabaraona † Dave Rabaraona
- Website: Les Surfs (official site); Les Surfs

Les Surfs were a yé-yé-style sibling pop group from Madagascar, that existed from 1963 until 1971.

== History ==
Coco, Pat, Rocky, Dave, Monikya (Monique), and Nicole Rabaraona were the eldest six of twelve children. Born in Madagascar, the four brothers and two sisters performed as the vocal group "Les Surfs" from 1963 to 1971.

On October 14, 1958, they entered a singing competition held by Radio Tananarive under the name "Rabaraona Brothers and Sisters" performing two songs by the Platters, "Only You" and "The Great Pretender". They were awarded with first prize and then began performing under the new name "the Beryl". They toured Madagascar with Henry Ratsimbazafy and the CCC guitars, and it was at this time they recorded their first 45's, "Little Flower", "Marin", and "The Three Bells".

On September 8, 1963, they appeared during the grand opening of the second television station in France. Their performance endeared them to the French public, so Jean-Louis Rafidy, who was chaperone to the Rabaraonas while in Paris, urged them to sign a contract with Festival Records and release a single as soon as possible. With the release of "Reviens Vite Et Oublie", a cover of "Be My Baby", the group who were now named "Les Surfs" were at the top of the charts for three months in France and in Spain and Mexico with a Spanish version. They toured with Frank Alamo and Sheila and in 1964 they performed at the Olympia in Paris. It was here they were proclaimed the "Newcomers of the Year".

They recorded and toured throughout the 1960s in languages and countries across the world. Performances at San Remo secured them as a popular act in Italy, Spain, and Germany. With further television appearances in France, Italy, England and the United States, they garnered an international audience of millions. The group secured many original compositions and some covers of English-language songs.

During a career spanning from 1958 to 1971, they also performed for royalty. By the late 1960s they had their own young families and so in 1971, at the end of a very long tour, Les Surfs decided to break up.

The following years would see Monique and Rocky reunite for a couple of years but this did not last. The male group members settled in Canada and started their own families. Monique lived in Canada for a while but eventually returned to live in France. Nicole immigrated to the United States. Monique died suddenly on November 15, 1993, at the age of 48. She is survived by her two sons Lawrence and Nicolas. Nicole died on May 5, 2000, and was laid to rest with her sister in the Rabaraona family tomb in Fiakarana, Madagascar.

In 2008, Dave Rabaraona started a new group called Les Surfs 2008 which participated in the French tour Âge tendre et tête de bois 2008 during the 2008–2009 season. The line up of Les Surfs 2008 included Dave, Isa Rabaraona, Jackya Rabaraona, his cousin Bruno, and Mahenintsoa Fidy. Dave died in February 2025.

== Members ==
- Monique (Monikya), born May 8, 1945, died November 15, 1993
- Nicole born July 21, 1946, died May 5, 2000
- Coco born June 19, 1939
- Pat born April 13, 1941
- Rocky born May 7, 1942
- Dave born December 4, 1943, died February 26, 2025

== Filmography ==
=== Television ===
- Tête de Bois et Tendres Années (1963), French TV
- Tête de Bois et Tendres Années (1964), French TV
- La Rose d'or de Montreux, appearing with the Rolling Stones (1964), Swiss TV
- Ready Steady Go!, with Petula Clark (1964), London TV
- Petula Clark Show (1965), London TV
- Rundherum die welt (1965), Hamburg TV
- La Rose d'or de Montreux (1965), Swiss TV
- The Hollywood Palace (1965), American TV
- Ready Steady Go!, appearing with the Rolling Stones (1966), London TV
- This Is Tom Jones (1966), London TV
- Petula Clark Show (1966), London TV
- Cravate Noir (1967), French TV
- Les Palmarès des Chansons (1967), French TV
- The Talk of the Town (1968), London TV
- The Jack Benny Show (1968), London TV

=== Film ===
- Cherchez l'idole (1964), French film

== Discography ==
=== Albums ===
- Go Your Way (Gentille, Lentine, Connor) (1965), RCA 1461

33 RPM LPs France

- Les Surfs à l'Olympia (1964), Festival FLD 330 S
- Les Surfs (1964), Festival FLD 337 S
- Les Surfs (1964), Festival FLD 340 S
- Les Surfs (1965), Festival FLD 345 S
- Les Surfs (1966), Festival FLD 375 S

33 RPM LPs Spain

- 16 Grandes Éxitos De Les Surfs (1964), Hispavox-Festival HF 31-02
- Les Surfs 16 Grandes Exitos (1976), Hispavox-Festival HF 31-03

=== Extended plays ===
45 RPM EPs France

- "Reviens vite et oublie / Ce garçon / Dum Dum Dee Dum / Pas si simple que ça" (1963 - Festival FX 1363)
- "Si j'avais un marteau / Écoute cet air-là / T'en va pas comme ça / Uh Uh" (1963 - Festival FX 1367)
- "À présent tu peux t'en aller / Je sais qu'un jour / Je te pardonne / Ça n'a pas d'importance from the film Cherchez L'Idole" (1964 - Festival FX 1378)
- "Shoop Shoop... Va l'embrasser / Je ne suis pas trop jeune / Adieu chagrin / Avec toi je ne sais plus" (1964 - Festival FX 1380)
- "Chaque nuit / Tu n'iras pas au ciel / Un toit ne suffit pas / Sacré Josh" (1964 - Festival FX 1410)
- "Le Printemps sur la colline / Tu Verras / Café, Vanille ou Chocolat / Pour une rose" (1965 - Festival FX 1432)
- "Tant que tu seras / Clac tape / Pour une pomme / Partager tous tes rêves" (1965 - Festival FX 1442)
- "Scandale dans la famille / Défense de toucher à mon amour / Ton souvenir / Stop" (1965 - Festival FX 1459)
- "Reviens Sloopy / Les hommes n'auront plus de peurs / If You Please / Pourquoi pas moi" (1965 - Festival FX 1470)
- "Par amour pour toi / Les Mouches au plafond / Va où tu veux / Sur tous les murs" (1966 - Festival FX 1480)
- "Alors / Mon chat qui s'appelle Médor / Longtemps / Pulchérie chérie" (1966 - Festival FX 1496)
- "Une rose de Vienne / Si loin d'Angleterre / Les Troubadours de notre temps / Un jour se lève" (1966 - Festival FX 1513)
- "Mon pays est bien loin / Drôle de fille / C'est grâce à toi / J'ai tant de joie" (1967 - Festival FX 1533)
- "Les Noces d'argent / Toi seul / Une tête dure / Aime-moi comme je t'aime" (1967 - Festival FX 1562)

45 RPM EPs Spain

- "Tu Serás Mi Baby / Mi Mejor Amigo / Dum-dum-dee-dum / Es Más Fácil Decirlo Que Hacerlo" (Hispavox-Festival HF 37-52)
- "Si Tuviera Un Martillo / Crossfire / Cuándo Lleguen Los Santos / No, No Me Dejes" (Hispavox-Festival HF 37-53)
- "Ciribiribín / Uh Huh / 100.000 Chicas / No Quieras A Un Extraño" (Hispavox-Festival HF 37-55)
- "Tu Serás Mi Baby / Ciribiribín / No, No Te Yayas / El Crossfire" (Hispavox-Festival HF 37-57)
- "Ahora Te Puedes Marchar / En Un Salón Del Siglo XVIII / No Tiene Importancia / Baby, Te Quiero" (Hispavox-Festival HF 37-58)
- "Su Forma De Besar / Nos Ven Muy Jóvenes / Hay Un Lugar / Hago Mal En Quererte" (Hispavox-Festival HF 37-60)
- De Mi Mejor Amigo (Compilación con otros cantantes) (Hispavox-Festival HF 37-61)
- "Cada Noche / Nunca Alcanzarás El Cielo / Querido Guillermo / Una Casa No Es Un Hogar" (Hispavox-Festival HF 37-64)
- "Su Forma De Besar / Ahora Te Puedes Marchar / Ya Verás / Por Una Rosa" (Hispavox-Festival HF 37-66)
- "Stop / La Gente Dice / Tus Sueños / Café, Vainilla O Chocolate" (Hispavox-Festival HF 37-67)
- "Por Una Rosa / Clac Tape / Ya Verás / El Juego Del Amor" (Hispavox-Festival HF 37-69)
- "Stop / El Juego Del Amor / El Mundo Necesita Amor / Escándalo En La Familia" (Hispavox-Festival HF 37-71)
- "Prohibido Acercarse A Mi Chica / ¿Por Qué No Yo? / Hang On, Sloopy / If You Please" (Hispavox-Festival HF 37-72)
- "En Una Flor / La Vida Es Así / Concierto Para Enamorados / Café, Vainilla O Chocolate" (Hispavox-Festival HF 37-76)
- "Flores En La Pared / Cosi' Come' Viene / In Un Fiore / En Las Paredes" (Hispavox-Festival HF 37-79)

45 RPM EPs Italy

- "Ce Garçon (My Best Friend) / Reviens Vite Et Oublie (Be My Baby)" (Festival FX 110)
- "Si J'avais Un Marteau (If I had a hammer) / Uh Huh" (Festival FX 111)
- "Quando Balli Il Surf / E Adesso Te Ne Puoi Andare" (Festival FX 117)
- "T'en Va Pas Comme Ça / Ça N'a Pas D'Importance" (Festival FX 118)
- "Quando Balli Il Surf / Spegnete Quella Luce" (Festival FX 119)
- "Si vedrà / Piu' Si Che No" (Festival FX 125)
- "Stop / Per Una Rosa" (Festival FX 126)
- "Clap Tap / Quando Tu Vorrai" (Festival FX 130)
- "Un Grosso Scandalo / Spiegami Come Mai" (Festival FX 131)
- "Così Come Viene / In Un Fiore" (Festival FX 133)
- "Molto Di Piu' / Va Dove Vuoi" (Festival FX 135)
- "L'Amore Verra' / AlloraLaLaLa" (Festival FX 137)
- "Quando Dico Che Ti Amo / L'Importante E Essere Liberi" (Festival FX 140)
