= Gianni Ravera =

Italian singer, impresario and record producer

Giandomenico Ravera
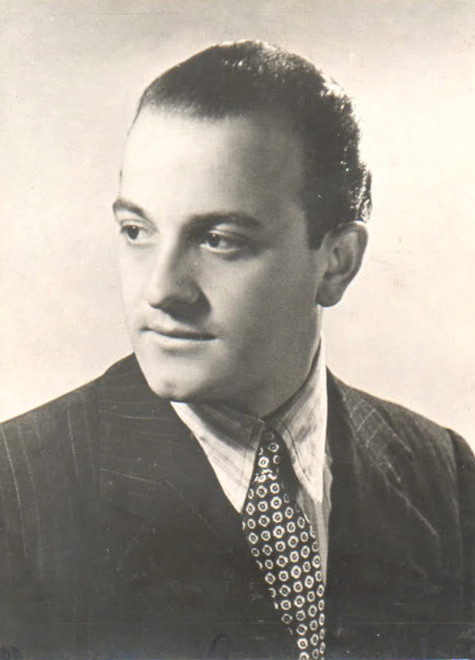
- Ravera in the 1940s
- Born: Lenin Ravera; 9 April 1920; Chiaravalle, Marche, Kingdom of Italy
- Died: 14 May 1986 (aged 66); Rome, Lazio, Italy
- Years active: 1942–1986

Giandomenico "Gianni" Ravera (born Lenin Ravera; 9 April 1920 – 14 May 1986) was an Italian singer, impresario and record producer.

== Life and career ==
Born in Chiaravalle, the son of a socialist anarchist, Ravera was originally named Lenin but was forced to change his first name after fascism came to power. He started his professional career as a singer in 1942, after having won together with Nilla Pizzi an EIAR contest for new musical artists. In the following years he was part of the major orchestras of the time, including those conducted by Cinico Angelini, Pippo Barzizza, Carlo Savina and Armando Trovajoli, and took part in three editions of the Sanremo Music Festival.

Ravera retired from singing in the late 1950s to become an impresario, organizing among others, eighteen editions of the Sanremo Music Festival, as well as several editions of Un disco per l'estate and Castrocaro Music Festival.
