= Robertino Loreti =

Italian singer

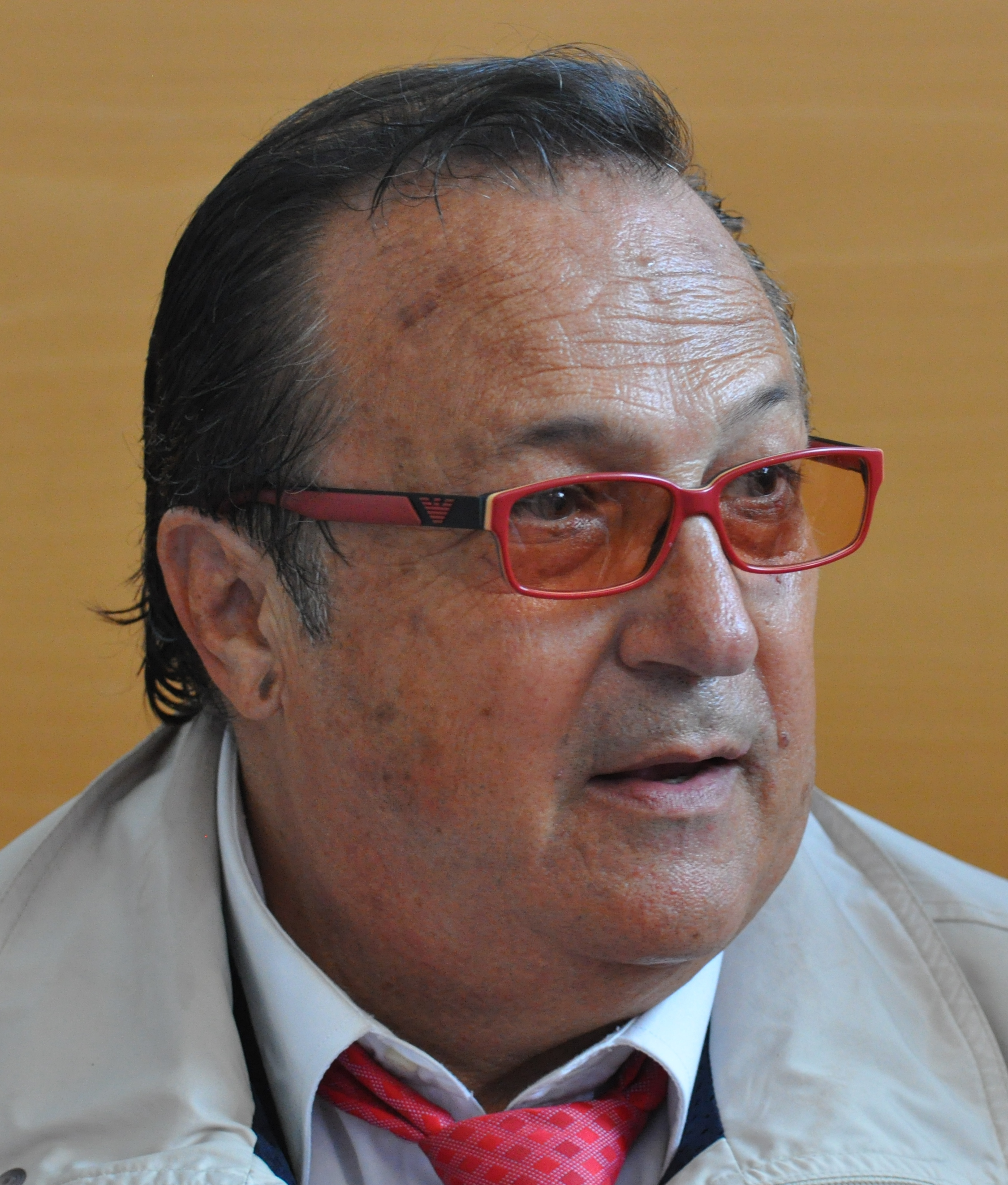
Robertino Loreti

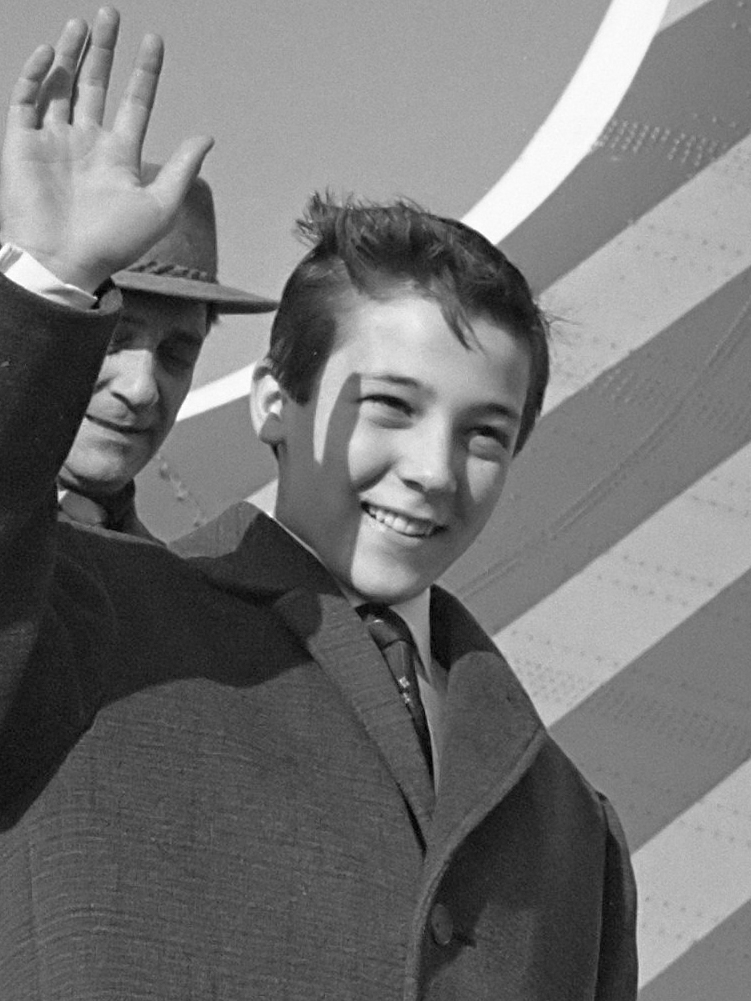
Robertino Loreti, 1961

Roberto Loreti (born 22 October 1947), also known by stage name Robertino (a diminutive of Roberto), is an Italian singer, known mostly for songs he performed as a teenager.

== Early years ==
Loreti was born in Rome to a large family with eight other children. His family was poor, and when he was 10, his father fell sick and Robertino helped the family by delivering bakery products to restaurants. He enjoyed singing folk songs on his way and was noticed by people for his singing voice. After a request to perform at a wedding in a restaurant, Robertino was sought after by other restaurants who competed for his service.

Robertino was singing at Cafe Grand Italia where Neapolitan actor Totò and Danish TV producer Volmer Sørensen noticed him. Sørensen was vacationing in Rome with his wife, singer Grethe Sønck, who noticed the boy. Sørensen persuaded his father to sign a contract, which stated that the boy would sing till age 17, and became his producer. That led to performances on Danish TV shows, tours of Scandinavia and Europe. Robertino would spend months on tour, singing up to three concerts a day, until his voice started to change. He recorded an album while in Copenhagen, and later published several albums and appeared in movies. Robertino has also been very popular in USSR.

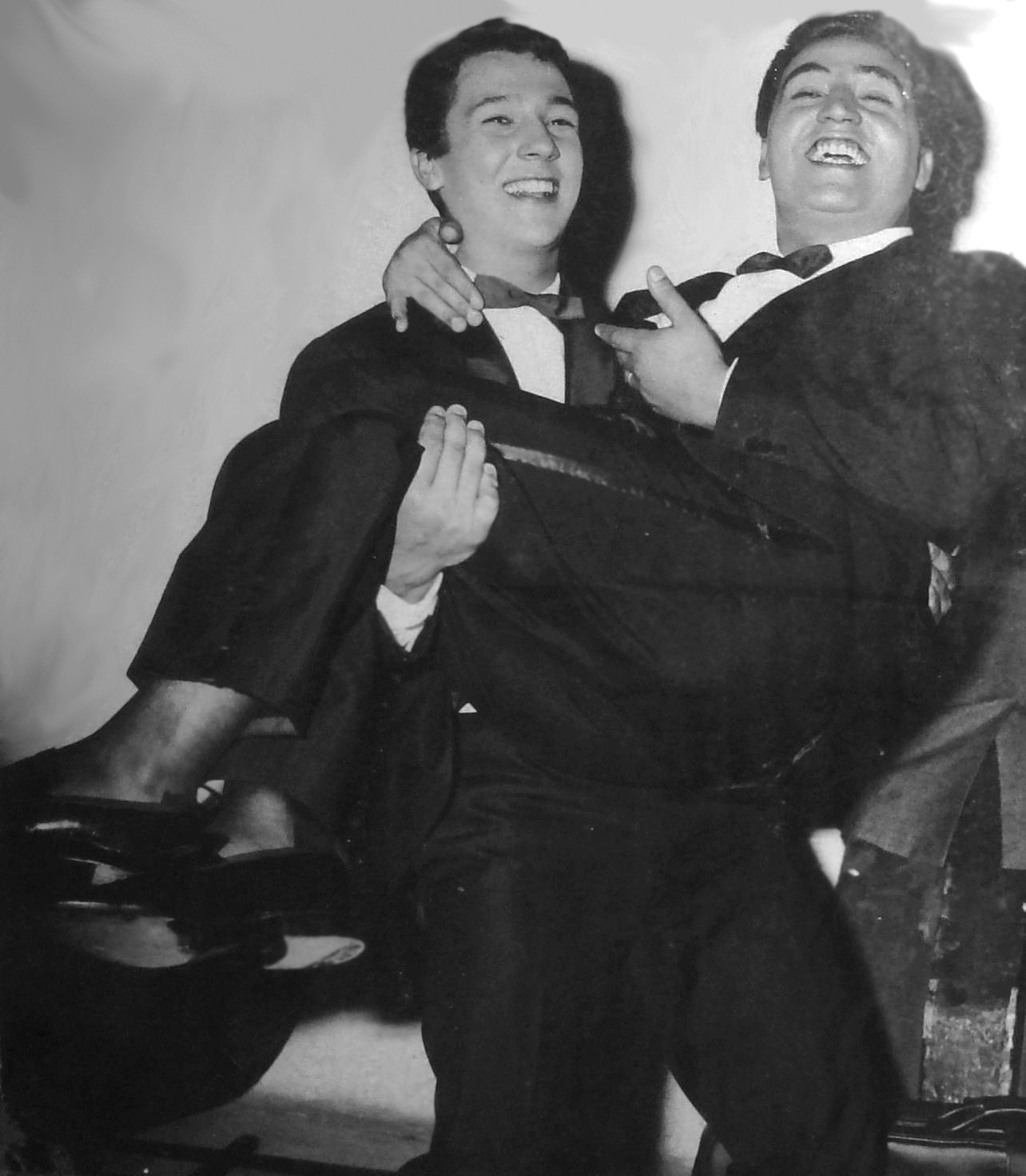
Robertino Loreti – Mario Trevi (1964)

== Later ==
His voice eventually changed and became a baritenor. Loreti still travels through Europe, the US and Russia performing in concerts. In post-Soviet countries, he became friends with singers Muslim Magomayev (died in 2008), Tamara Sinyavskaya and Joseph Kobzon. Cosmonaut Valentina Tereshkova requested his records played while she was in space. Russian poet Yevgeny Yevtushenko wrote a poem titled "Robertino Loreti".

== Alleged conspiracy to murder Loreti ==
Pietro Castelluzzo, 58, was arrested Thursday, February 25, 2010, by members of the Organized Crime Enforcement unit of the Toronto Police Service, in Toronto, Ontario, Canada, and charged with four counts of counselling to commit three murders, the target of one of which was Roberto Loreti. The suspect had known the singer for decades, and Loreti had stayed at Castelluzo family home in Toronto in the 1980s. It was at that time that Castelluzzo believed Loreti had slept with his wife. The murder was to take place while Loreti had an engagement at the Fallsview Casino, Niagara Falls, Ontario, the following weekend.
