= Castrocaro Music Festival =

Italian music festival

The Castrocaro Music Festival, also known as Concorso per Voci Nuove, is an Italian musical contest which takes place every year in the town of Castrocaro Terme e Terra del Sole, near Forlì, from 1957. The competition is exclusively reserved for new talents, and it had its maximum popularity from 1962 to early Eighties when, under the direction of Gianni Ravera, based on an agreement with the Sanremo Music Festival the top two finishers of the competition gained the access to the Sanremo Festival. Singers who were launched by the event include Gigliola Cinquetti, Iva Zanicchi, Zucchero Fornaciari, Fiordaliso, Caterina Caselli, Laura Pausini, Eros Ramazzotti, Franco Simone and Alice.

== Winners ==
The winners of the festival are:

- 1957 - Tina Castelli
- 1958 - Edda Montanari
- 1959 - Carmen Villani
- 1960 - Angela Venturoli
- 1961 - Anna Maria, Cristina Amadei
- 1962 - Eugenia Foligatti, Gianni La Commare
- 1963 - Gigliola Cinquetti, Bruno Filippini
- 1964 - Franco Tozzi, Vittorio Inzaina
- 1965 - Luciana Turina, Plinio Maggi
- 1966 - Annarita Spinaci, Roberta Amadei
- 1967 - Giuni Russo (as Giusy Romeo), Elio Gandolfi
- 1968 - Paolo Mengoli, Rosalba Archilletti
- 1969 - Lucia Rizzi, Dino Drusiani
- 1970 - Marisa Sacchetto, Mara Nanni
- 1971 - Alice (as Carla Bissi), Mauro Brighetti
- 1972 - Franco Simone, Roberto Callegaro
- 1973 - Emanuela Cortesi, Maila Mazzeranghi
- 1974 - Liliana Savoca, Denise & Gloria Calore
- 1975 - Aldo Poli, Grazia Sanvitale
- 1976 - Collage, Walter Foini, La Strana Sensazione, Giulia Del Buono, Marcello Scichilone
- 1977 - Michele Pecora, I Pub, Fiora, La Fabbrica di Stelle
- 1978 - Ezio Maria Picciotta, Roberta Voltolini, Antonietta Chelli, Creme Caramel
- 1979 - Goran Kuzminac, Michele Zarrillo, Daniel Danieli, Limousine
- 1980 - Luca Barbarossa
- 1981 - Zucchero Fornaciari, Fiordaliso
- 1982 - Donatella Milani, Brunella Borciani
- 1983 -Rodolfo Banchelli, Silvia Conti
- 1984 - Lorena Biolcati, Laura Landi, Milvio Cardellini, Raul Rizzardi
- 1985 - Aida Satta Flores, Studio Hertz
- 1986 - Charley Deanesi, Andrea Mirò (as Roberta Mogliotti)
- 1987 - Rosario Di Bella, Ice
- 1988 - Antonietta Buccigrossi, Valerio Spazzoli
- 1989 - Lorenzo Zecchino
- 1990 - Margherita Cazzuffi
- 1991 - Bracco Di Graci
- 1992 - Tony Blescia
- 1993 - Lighea
- 1994 - Marco D’Angelo
- 1995 - Silvia Salemi
- 1996 - Mignon
- 1997 - Daniela & Liliana Caronna
- 1998 - Not assigned
- 1999 - Max Petronilli
- 2000 - Not assigned
- 2001 - Filippo Merola, Teresa De Filippis
- 2002 - Riccardo Maffoni
- 2003 - Maria Pierantoni Giua
- 2004 - Ilaria Porceddu
- 2005 - Lorena Belcastro
- 2006 - Jacopo Troiani
- 2007 - Angela Semerano
- 2008 - Simona Galeandro
- 2009 - Edoardo Lo Conte
- 2010 - Nicola Traversa
- 2011 - Kiero
- 2012 - Martina Cambi
- 2013 - Davide Papasidero
- 2014 - Alina Nicosia
- 2015 - Dalise
- 2016 - Ethan Lara
- 2017 - Luigi Salvaggio
- 2018 - Maria (Valentina Egrotelli)
- 2019 - Debora Manenti
- 2020 - Watt
- 2021 - Simo Veludo
- 2022 - Not assigned
- 2023 - Djomi
- 2024 - Klem
