= Remo Germani =

Italian singer and actor

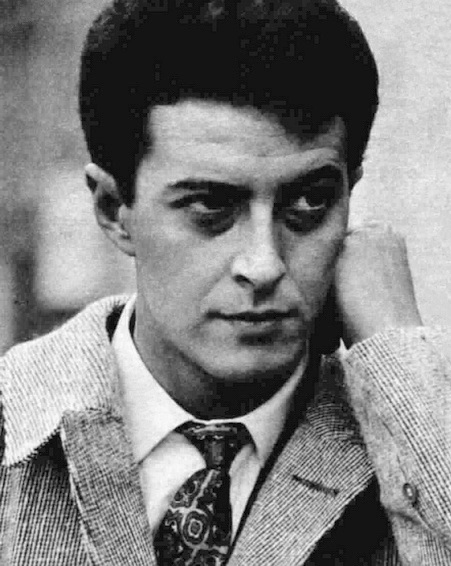
- Born: Remo Speroni; 31 May 1938; Milan, Kingdom of Italy
- Died: 18 October 2010 (aged 72); Vigevano, Italy
- Occupations: Singer, actor

Remo Speroni (31 May 1938 – 18 October 2010), known professionally as Remo Germani, was an Italian singer and occasional actor, mainly successful in the 1960s.

== Life and career ==
Germani was born in Milan. While employed as a bank teller in 1957, Germani started performing as a singer in his spare time. Put under contract by the record company Jolly, in 1962 he got his first success, "Baci". In 1963 he ranked third on the Italian hit parade with the song "Non andare col tamburo". Between 1964 and 1967 he participated to four editions of the Sanremo Music Festival and appeared in a few Musicarello films. In 1978 he moved to Vigevano, where he founded Radio City Ducale. From the 1980s he was active as the leader of a dance orchestra. In his later years he developed diabetes.

== Discography ==
Albums

- 1963 - Baci (Jolly, LPJ 5026)
- 1965 - Remo Germani (Jolly, LPJ 5044)
- 1990 - Germani 90 (Fonit Cetra, PL 798)
- 1998 - Remo Germani - Baci (Joker, CD 22193)
