= Sanremo Music Festival 1973 =

Italian song contest (23rd edition)

Dates and venue
- First night: 8 March 1973
- Second night: 9 March 1973
- Final night: 10 March 1973
- Venue: Sanremo Casino; Sanremo, Italy

Organisation
- Organiser: Municipality of Sanremo

Production
- Broadcaster: Radiotelevisione italiana (RAI)
- Directors: Adriana Parrella; Enrico Moscatelli
- Artistic director: Vittorio Salvetti
- Presenters: Gabriella Farinon; Mike Bongiorno (final)

Vote
- Number of entries: 30
- Winner: "Un grande amore e niente più" Peppino di Capri

The Sanremo Music Festival 1973 (Italian: Festival di Sanremo 1973), officially the 23rd Italian Song Festival (23º Festival della canzone italiana), was the 23rd annual Sanremo Music Festival, held at the Sanremo Casino in Sanremo between 8 and 10 March 1973. It was organised by the municipality of Sanremo and broadcast by Radiotelevisione italiana (RAI). The first two nights were presented by Gabriella Farinon, who joined Mike Bongiorno in presenting the final. Vittorio Salvetti served as artistic director.

The winning song was "Un grande amore e niente più" written by Peppino di Capri, Franco Califano and Gianni Wright, and performed by di Capri himself.

It was the first edition to be produced in colour. In January 2017, RAI announced they were given a one-hour colour copy of the final from Czech broadcaster ČT, broadcast originally in Czechoslovakia by ČST in 1973, which they uploaded to their streaming service RaiPlay.

== Format ==
In December 1972, the Sanremo city council passed a resolution allowing the municipality of Sanremo to organise the festival's 1973 edition directly, as they had done the previous year. An executive committee composed of city councillors, chaired by tourism councillor Napoleone Cavaliere, was established to oversee the event's organisation. Changes to the regulations, which included increasing the number of competing songs to thirty-two, increasing the participation fee and preventing the song selection commission from asking artists for a second song, were approved by the council on 28 December. The festival's artistic direction was later assigned to Vittorio Salvetti.

A decision was made by the Sanremo city council to move the dates of the festival from the end of February to the second week of March, between 8 and 10 March 1973, as a way to extend the city's tourism season. The event was held in its usual venue, the ballroom of the Sanremo Casino, with a stage designed by Lorenzo Musso and Rino Ceriolo using orange and yellow to represent the Sanremo sun, decorated with strelitzia, anthurium and tall cactus plants.

=== Voting system ===
The vote in each show was conducted by a regional jury representing eleven Italian cities. To select the twenty jury members and ten reserve members for each jury, telephone operators called three hundred telephone numbers in each city selected at random by a computer. Jury members were gathered in the editorial office of a newspaper in their city and during the shows, rated each song from one to ten immediately after it was performed. In the event of a tie, a backup jury located in the venue would cast a deciding vote.

== Selections ==
=== Una voce per Sanremo ===
A preliminary competition titled Una voce per Sanremo ("A Voice for Sanremo") was held by the municipality of Sanremo across three shows between 20 and 22 December 1972 in the Sanremo Casino, with the purpose of determining two newcomer artists between the ages of 18 and 25 to participate in the festival's 1973 edition. After applications for the competition were advertised in the magazine TV Sorrisi e Canzoni and by Radio Monte Carlo, the municipality received 750 submissions from interested artists. Twenty-nine competing artists were selected through sixteen regional competitions held in the lead-up to the event.

Una voce per Sanremo participants
- Alberto Feri
- Amelia Tuccillo
- Amelia Violi
- Andrea Mulas
- Angela Maselli
- Antonio Jacono
- Antonio Sturaro
- Assunta Quercioli
- Cesidio Di Francescantonio
- Enrico Fratini
- Ernesto Esposito
- Franco Sidoti
- Gaetano Casella
- Gilda Giuliani
- Leonardo Morelli
- Lia De Felice
- Marcella Guttadaura
- Maria Catalano
- Maria Clara Salmaso
- Maria Rosa Carmi
- Marisa Bulgarini
- Pasquale Capobianco
- Riccardo Marini
- Romana Nicolò
- Rosa Gibertini
- Rosanna Magnarin
- Sabino Di Nicoli
- Silvana Rizza
- Sonia Dal Zen

Sixteen artists participated in the final and a jury selected Gilda Giuliani and Alberto Feri as the winners. As winners of the competition, they were guaranteed spots in the festival's list of competing artists and given the right to submit three of their songs to the song selection commission.

== Competing entries ==
In January 1973, the municipality of Sanremo sent invitations to 225 Italian and foreign artists to submit up to two songs for the competition. They received 198 song submissions from 150 artists after the close of the deadline on 15 February. The municipality appointed a twenty-member special commission tasked with selecting thirty-two submissions for the competition, chaired by tourism councillor Napoleone Cavaliere, and consisting of the journalists Gigi Speroni, Gigi Vesigna and Carlo Rombai, the writer Michele D'Arcangelo, the actors Ernesto Calindri and Alighiero Noschese, the musicians Cesare Gallino, Carlo Farina and Mirella Salesi, the politicians Carlo De Paola and Pasquale Lopez, Emilio Raffaele Papa representing the Order of Journalists, the union representatives Eraldo Villa, Aldo Voglio and Mario Ippoliti, the sports commentator Nicolò Carosio and four citizens of Sanremo. The song selection process took place in Pian di Poma in Sanremo and was recorded via closed-circuit television cameras, able to viewed live by accredited journalists and record company representatives. Nineteen of the twenty commission members chose the thirty-two competing entries on 20 February, along with six reserve entries in case any of the chosen artists were unable to participate.

The list of competing artists was noted by press for including a smaller amount of Italian artists with substantial fame than in previous years. Among the well-known artists notably rejected by the commission were Rita Pavone, Lucio Dalla, Nada, Al Bano, Gianni Nazzaro, Marisa Sannia and Don Backy.

On 6 March, the festival's organisers received a tongue-and-cheek telegram from Adriano Celentano, after he had failed to attend rehearsals earlier in the day, announcing his withdrawal from the competition with his song "L'unica chance" due to a "sudden attack of gastritis" preventing him from attending the event. In his telegram, Celentano claimed to have been ordered by a doctor to rest for five days, and that his recovery would not be until 11 March, a day after the final. He added that he believed his illness stemmed from "when the selection committee rejected well-known figures of Italian song, without taking into account their prestigious contribution to Italian song in general and especially to the various previous editions of the Sanremo festival".

Shortly before the festival took place, Rosa Balistreri's entry "Terra che non senti" was accused of having already been performed, therefore breaking the festival's rules requiring competing songs to be unreleased. The accusation was sent to the festival's executive committee via telegram on 5 March, claiming that a 30-second Sicilian version of the song was performed by the singer Marina Pagano on 27 October 1972 during a television special dedicated to Balistreri. The situation was brought to the attention of Radiotelevisione italiana (RAI), who conducted an investigation and confirmed they had documentation of the performance. Following the confirmation, the municipality announced the song's disqualification on 7 March. The municipality confirmed during a press conference that the telegram was sent by Umberto Bindi and the writers of his song "Sinfonia per un violino", which had been put first in the reserve list, and who had requested to take Balistreri's place in the competition. However, they also stated reserve songs could not replace last-minute disqualifications as per the festival's regulations. Balistreri instead performed a concert with several of her songs, including "Terra che non senti", on the day after the festival's conclusion in the same venue.

Entry withdrawn/disqualified

Competing entries
Song	Artist	Songwriter(s)	Votes
~~"L'unica chance"~~	~~Adriano Celentano~~	Adriano Celentano; Daniele Baima Besquet	~~14~~
"Ogni volta che mi pare"	Alberto Feri	Piero Pintucci; Franca Evangelisti	12
"Tre minuti di ricordi"	Alessandro	Alessandro Pintus; Miki Del Prete	17
"Mi sono chiesta tante volte"	Anna Identici	Gianni Guarnieri; Pier Paolo Preti	12
"Cara amica"	Bassano	Vitaliano Caruso; Paolo Prencipe	17
"Dove andrai"	Carmen Amato	Detto Mariano	11
"Mondo mio"	Christian De Sica	Maurizio Conte; Giorgio Conte	11
"Tu giovane amore mio"	Donatello	Ricky Gianco; Alberto Nicorelli; Dante Pieretti; Fulvio Monachesi	14
"Vado via"	Drupi	Enrico Riccardi; Luigi Albertelli	16
"La bandiera di sole"	Fausto Leali	Fausto Leali; Vito Pallavicini	11
"Mistero"	Gigliola Cinquetti	Claudio Mattone	13
"Serena"	Gilda Giuliani	Gino Mescoli; Musikus	13
"Come sei bella"	I Camaleonti	Claudio Cavallaro; Giancarlo Bigazzi	19
"Anika na-o"	Jet	Piero Cassano; Renzo Cochis; Felice Piccarreda	18
"Povero"	Junior Magli	Mario Mellier; Luciana Medini	13
"Una casa grande"	Lara Saint Paul	Nereo Villa; Andrea Lo Vecchio	15
"Sugli sugli bane bane"	Le Figlie del Vento	Paolo Tomelleri; Anna Maria Piccioli	16
"Straniera straniera"	Lionello	Franco Chiaravalle; Francesco Specchia	11
"Innamorata io"	Lolita	Franco Chiaravalle; Alessandro Celentano	14
"Il mondo è qui"	Memo Remigi	Memo Remigi	18
"Da troppo tempo"	Milva	Gene Colonnello; Luigi Albertelli	19
"Addio amor"	Mocedades	Mario Nobile; Massimo Gallerani; Gianfranco Bosisio	16
"Un grande amore e niente più"	Peppino di Capri	Gianni Wright; Giuseppe Faiella; Franco Califano	16
"Come un ragazzino"	Peppino Gagliardi	Peppino Gagliardi; Gaetano Amendola	19
"Angeline"	Pop-Tops	Rosa Nisi Marsella; Daiano	14
"Dolce frutto"	Ricchi e Poveri	Umberto Balsamo; Cristiano Minellono	19
"L'uomo che si gioca il cielo a dadi"	Roberto Vecchioni	Roberto Vecchioni	19
~~"Terra che non senti"~~	~~Rosa Balistreri~~	~~Alberto Piazza~~	~~19~~
"Elisa Elisa"	Sergio Endrigo	Sergio Endrigo; Sergio Bardotti	19
"Via Garibaldi"	Toni Santagata	Toni Santagata	13
"Amore mio"	Umberto Balsamo	Umberto Balsamo; Cristiano Minellono	16
"Tu nella mia vita"	Wess and Dori Ghezzi	Arfemo; Felice Piccarreda	16

Reserve entries
#	Song	Artist	Songwriter(s)
1	"Sinfonia per un violino"	Umberto Bindi	Ventre; Sorgi; Bindi
2	"Vento caldo"	Ivano Fossati	Ivano Fossati
3	"Violino"	Oreste Vainiglia	Maggi; De Luca; Celentano
4	"Made in Italy"	Jimmy Fontana	Franca Evangelisti; Jimmy Fontana
5	"Aspetta"	Gilda	Cirulli; Rosangela Scalabrino
6	"Awamalaia"	La Famiglia degli Ortega	Felice Da Vià; Felice Piccarreda

== Shows ==
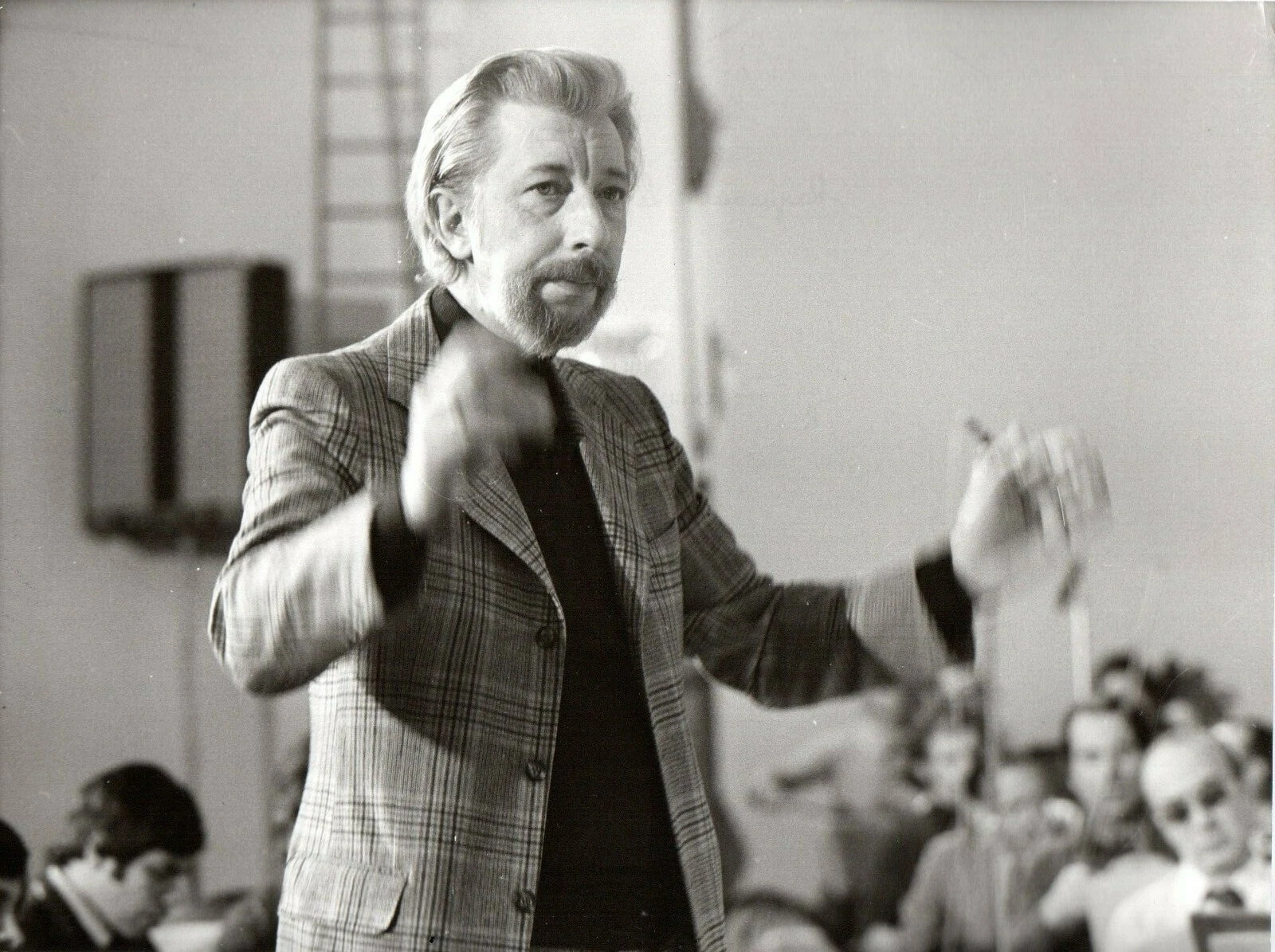
French conductor Raymond Lefèvre conducting the festival's orchestra

The festival consisted of three shows held between 8 and 10 March 1973. The first two nights were broadcast only on radio and consisted of fifteen songs each. Eight songs qualified from each show, creating a final consisting of sixteen songs. Performances were able to be accompanied by the 42-piece orchestra in the venue. The song "Bach's Lunch" composed by Percy Faith served as the festival's opening theme, and the song "Sanremo ventitré" performed by Giampiero Boneschi on a Moog synthesizer served as the closing theme. The radio director for the shows was Adriana Parrella, while the television director was Enrico Moscatelli.

The final was presented by Mike Bongiorno, who was assisted by Gabriella Farinon. The first two nights were presented solely by Farinon due to Bongiorno's commitments with hosting the show Rischiatutto. In each show, instrumental recaps of the competing songs were played by the orchestra under direction from the French conductor Raymond Lefèvre.

A draw took place on 2 March at the Fonit Cetra studios in Milan, where first rehearsals for the festival were held, to determine the running order for the first two nights. Rosa Balistreri and Adriano Celentano were originally drawn to perform 13th and 15th respectively during the second night, with the date of Toni Santagata's performance switched from the first night to the second night to fill their absences.

=== First night ===
The first night took place on 8 March 1973 at 21:00 CET. Fifteen artists performed their songs and eight were selected for the final.

Qualifier

First night – 8 March 1973
R/O	Song	Artist	Points	Place
1	"Tu giovane amore mio"	Donatello	1,318	2
2	"L'uomo che si gioca il cielo a dadi"	Roberto Vecchioni	1,128	8
3	"Tu nella mia vita"	Wess and Dori Ghezzi	1,202	6
4	"Elisa Elisa"	Sergio Endrigo	1,101	11
5	"Sugli sugli bane bane"	Le Figlie del Vento	1,122	9
6	"Povero"	Junior Magli	1,053	13
7	"Dove andrai"	Carmen Amato	900	14
8	"La bandiera di sole"	Fausto Leali	1,306	3
9	"Addio amor"	Mocedades	1,096	12
10	"Vado via"	Drupi	891	15
11	"Mi sono chiesta tante volte"	Anna Identici	1,230	4
12	"Come un ragazzino"	Peppino Gagliardi	1,409	1
13	"Straniera straniera"	Lionello	1,213	5
14	"Mistero"	Gigliola Cinquetti	1,120	10
15	"Tre minuti di ricordi"	Alessandro	1,137	7

=== Second night ===
The second night took place on 9 March 1973 at 21:00 CET. Fifteen artists performed their songs and eight were selected for the final.

Qualifier

Second night – 9 March 1973
R/O	Song	Artist	Points	Place
1	"Anika na-o"	Jet	864	15
2	"Amore mio"	Umberto Balsamo	1,342	4
3	"Serena"	Gilda Giuliani	1,149	7
4	"Il mondo è qui"	Memo Remigi	1,158	6
5	"Dolce frutto"	Ricchi e Poveri	1,405	3
6	"Un grande amore e niente più"	Peppino di Capri	1,535	1
7	"Innamorata io"	Lolita	1,046	12
8	"Come sei bella"	I Camaleonti	1,262	5
9	"Cara amica"	Bassano	964	13
10	"Una casa grande"	Lara Saint Paul	1,145	8
11	"Ogni volta che mi pare"	Alberto Feri	1,135	9
12	"Angeline"	Pop-Tops	888	14
13	"Mondo mio"	Christian De Sica	1,048	11
14	"Via Garibaldi"	Toni Santagata	1,082	10
15	"Da troppo tempo"	Milva	1,409	2

=== Final night ===
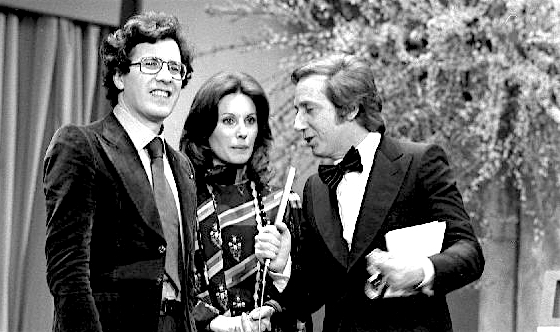
Winning performer Peppino di Capri (left) with presenters Mike Bongiorno and Gabriella Farinon

The final night took place on 10 March 1973 at 21:00 CET. The sixteen finalists performed their songs again and a winner was chosen.

The winning song was "Un grande amore e niente più" performed by Peppino di Capri, and written by di Capri, Franco Califano and Gianni Wright. "Come un ragazzino" performed by Peppino Gagliardi, and written by Gagliardi and Gaetano Amendola, placed second, and "Da troppo tempo" performed by Milva, written by Luigi Albertelli and Gene Colonnello, placed third.

The song "Elisa Elisa" performed by Sergio Endrigo and written by Endrigo with Sergio Bardotti, which was eliminated during the first night, received a prize for the best lyrics among the competing songs decided by a commission appointed by the municipality of Sanremo. Junior Magli, who was also eliminated during the first night, received the Giorgio Berti award given to the best performer as decided by journalists at the event.

Winner

Final night – 10 March 1973
R/O	Song	Artist	Points	Place
1	"Il mondo è qui"	Memo Remigi	1,111	13
2	"Straniera straniera"	Lionello	1,050	15
3	"Una casa grande"	Lara Saint Paul	990	16
4	"Tu giovane amore mio"	Donatello	1,131	12
5	"Come sei bella"	I Camaleonti	1,170	11
6	"La bandiera di sole"	Fausto Leali	1,226	8
7	"Mi sono chiesta tante volte"	Anna Identici	1,197	10
8	"Amore mio"	Umberto Balsamo	1,224	9
9	"Tu nella mia vita"	Wess and Dori Ghezzi	1,295	6
10	"Come un ragazzino"	Peppino Gagliardi	1,482	2
11	"Da troppo tempo"	Milva	1,463	3
12	"L'uomo che si gioca il cielo a dadi"	Roberto Vecchioni	1,246	7
13	"Dolce frutto"	Ricchi e Poveri	1,430	4
14	"Tre minuti di ricordi"	Alessandro	1,065	14
15	"Serena"	Gilda Giuliani	1,413	5
16	"Un grande amore e niente più"	Peppino di Capri	1,710	1

== Broadcasts ==
The 1973 edition of the festival was the first to be produced in colour, and although it was broadcast in Italy in black and white, it was broadcast in colour abroad.

=== Local broadcast ===
In January 1973, RAI announced they would broadcast only the final night of the festival on television, leaving the first two nights broadcast exclusively on radio. The decision was made following a request from the Italian Ministry of Post and Telecommunications, suggested by the parliamentary central broadcasting supervisory committee as part of an initiative to limit pop music television programming throughout 1973.

The first two nights were broadcast via radio on Secondo Programma beginning at 21:00 CET. The final night was broadcast on both Programma Nazionale (television) and Secondo Programma (radio) at 21:00 CET. The final was broadcast on television in Italy to an estimated 20.4 million viewers—six million less than for the previous edition.

=== International broadcast ===
The final night was broadcast via the Eurovision and Intervision networks in other countries. It was reportedly aired by broadcasters in Portugal, Turkey, Hungary, Poland, Bulgaria, the Soviet Union and Morocco. For the first time, radio broadcasts were available in the Middle East through Radio Monte-Carlo Middle East. Known details on the broadcasts in each country, including the specific broadcasting stations and commentators are shown in the tables below.

International broadcasters of the Sanremo Music Festival 1973
Country	Broadcaster	Channel(s)	Commentator(s)	Ref(s)
Chile	UCTV	Canal 13 (Note: Delayed broadcast on 27 March at 22:30 (CLST),)		
Czechoslovakia	ČST	II. program (Note: Delayed broadcast on 29 April at 19:45 (CET),)		
East Germany	DFF	DFF (Note: Delayed broadcast on 24 July 1973 at 10:35 (CET))		
Greece	EIRT	EIRT (Note: Delayed broadcast on 11 March 1973 at 22:30 (EET))		
Japan	NHK	NHK (Note: Delayed broadcast on 30 June 1973 at 14:10 (JST))	Yutaka Ishida	
Romania	TVR	Programul 1 (Note: Delayed broadcast in a shortened format on 22 April 1973 at 22:00 (EET))		
Spain	Cadena SER (Note: Simulcast on Radio Girona.)			
Yugoslavia	JRT	TV Beograd 1		
Yugoslavia	JRT	TV Zagreb 1		

== Incidents and controversies ==
=== Extortion claims ===
Following the completion of the festival's song selection process in February, the singer Andrea Mulas, who had participated in the festival's preliminary competition Una voce per Sanremo, filed a legal complaint for extortion against the competition's organiser, Bruno Berri, and the chair of the festival's executive committee, councillor Napoleone Cavaliere. Mulas alleged that Berri had assured him victory in the competition if he paid him ten million lire, half of which was for Cavaliere, and had paid Berri three and half million in advance. After he failed to win the competition by placing third, he claimed that Cavaliere assured him that he would be selected to participate in the festival regardless. In response, Cavaliere filed a complaint against Berri's manager, Roberto Marzano, for attempted extortion and insulting a public official, claiming an interaction took place in which Marzano threatened to "cause a scandal" if Mulas was not admitted into the festival. In 1975, both Mulas and Berri were addressed by a magistrate in Sanremo.
