= Sanremo Music Festival 1975 =

Italian song contest (25th edition)

Dates and venue
- First night: 27 February 1975
- Second night: 28 February 1975
- Final night: 1 March 1975
- Venue: Sanremo Casino; Sanremo, Italy

Organisation
- Organiser: Municipality of Sanremo

Production
- Broadcaster: Radiotelevisione italiana (RAI)
- Directors: Adriana Parrella; Enrico Moscatelli
- Musical director: Enrico Simonetti
- Artistic director: Bruno Pallesi
- Presenters: Mike Bongiorno and Sabina Ciuffini

Vote
- Number of entries: 30
- Winner: "Ragazza del sud" Gilda

The Sanremo Music Festival 1975 (Italian: Festival di Sanremo 1975), officially the 25th Italian Song Festival (25º Festival della canzone italiana), was the 25th annual Sanremo Music Festival, held at the Sanremo Casino in Sanremo between 27 February and 1 March 1975. It was organised by the municipality of Sanremo and broadcast by Radiotelevisione italiana (RAI). The shows were presented by Mike Bongiorno, assisted by Sabina Ciuffini. Bruno Pallesi served as artistic director.

The festival consisted largely of emerging artists due to a boycott from major record labels in protest of decisions the municipality of Sanremo made during its organisation. The winning song was "Ragazza del sud" performed by Gilda, who also wrote and composed the song, making her the first female songwriter to win the festival.

== Format ==
In September 1974, Sanremo city councillors unanimously approved returning the festival's organisation to the municipality for the 1975 edition, after entrusting the event to private organisers the previous year. An executive committee of city councillors was put in charge of managing the event, chaired by tourism, sports and events councillor Napoleone Cavaliere, who stated the municipality's decision was "the most suitable solution to save an event that has been in crisis for years". Bruno Pallesi was later chosen as the festival's artistic director.

The executive committee approved a new set of regulations in November, which included abolishing the split between big and newcomer artists introduced for the previous edition, as well as numerous changes to the song selection process, allowing only writers and composers to submit songs instead of artists, and for the municipality to have full control over the pairing of submitted songs with artists, rather than record companies as in previous years. Additionally, they stated thirty songs would compete, with each song performed twice by a total of sixty artists. However, due to complaints from record companies, the regulations were later amended to have songs performed only once.

The municipality also decided to eliminate record companies' ability to assign conductors to the performances of their respective competing artists, instead appointing a sole musical director for the event to conduct the orchestra for every song, Enrico Simonetti. This was the first edition since 1956 to feature only one conductor for all competing songs.

=== Voting system ===
The vote in each show was conducted by four juries: three composed of randomly drawn RAI telephone subscribers representing regions of Italy and another composed of randomly drawn audience members in the venue. For the first two nights, sixty jurors contacted via telephone and thirty jurors in the audience were drawn, with each juror giving one vote to two different songs. In the final, the voting took place over multiple rounds, culminating in a final round to choose a winner from six of the twelve finalists.

== Competing entries ==
152 songs were submitted for the competition by writers and composers invited by the municipality of Sanremo. A sixteen-member special commission was appointed by the festival's organising committee, tasked with selecting thirty of the submissions to compete. It was composed of seven representatives from Sanremo's political parties, including Napoleone Cavaliere who chaired the commission, the president of Sanremo's tourism board Bruno Stilli, the music school director Mirella Salesi, the orchestra director Carlo Farina, three union representatives and three citizens of Sanremo. The selection process took place in a building at a shooting range in Pian di Poma, Sanremo and was recorded via closed-circuit television cameras. The thirty songs selected by the commission were announced on 29 January, along with three reserve entries.

In February, Cavaliere met with the festival's artistic director Bruno Pallesi and the festival's musical director Enrico Simonetti to pair the competing songs with artists proposed by record labels. The full list of competing artists was announced on 11 February.

The festival was informally boycotted by the majority of major record labels due to the municipality's choice to reduce labels' influence on the event and its regulations. This led to mostly emerging artists and songwriters taking part, with only the artist Rosanna Fratello having achieved mainstream success in Italy before the event. Additionally, around seventy percent of the competing songs were written by songwriters who had previously published music at their own expense.

Shortly after the full list of competing artists was announced, Tony Del Monaco was replaced by Nico dei Gabbiani as the performer of the song "Io credo". French singer Nicoletta, scheduled to perform the song "Se nasco un'altra volta", withdrew from the competition on 13 February due to commitments to perform at the Olympia music hall in Paris, with Paola Musiani named as her replacement. Swiss artist Marisa Frigerio, performer of "Dolce abitudine", was also replaced with Daniela.

Competing entries
Song	Artist	Songwriter(s)
"Ipocrisia"	Angela Luce	Eduardo Alfieri; Pino Giordano
"La paura di morire"	Annagloria	Ettore Ballotta; Pino Calvi; Giorgio Calabrese
"Lettera"	Antonella Bellan	Pier Benito Greco; Mario Mellier; Renato Scala; Luciana Medini
"Dolce abitudine"	Daniela	Giuliano Rigo; Piero Montanaro; Enzo Ceppani
"Tango di casa mia"	Ely Neri	Elio Neri
"1975... amore mio"	Emy Cesaroni	Paolo Prencipe; Francesco Specchia
"Decidi tu per me"	Eugenio Alberti	Alfredo Gallo; Enzo Ceppani; Piero Montanaro
"In amore non si può mentire"	Eva 2000	Mario Cenci; Luigi Capello
"Come Humphrey Bogart"	Franco e le Piccole Donne	Bruno Pallini; Luciano Raggi
"Oggi"	G.Men	Tino Cavalli
"Adesso basti tu"	Gabriella Sanna	Gianni Meccia; Bruno Zambrini
"Sei stata tu"	Gianni Migliardi	Aldo Valleroni; Franco Tessandori; Sergio Piccioli
"Ragazza del sud"	Gilda	Rosangela Scalabrino
"Scarafaggi"	Goffredo Canarini	Goffredo Canarini
"Innamorarsi"	Jean-François Michael	Amedeo Olivares; Bruno Stecca; Dino Sarti; Angelo De Lorenzo
"Piccolo bambino caro"	Kriss and Saratoga	Sabino Sciannamea; Francesco Specchia
"Quattro stagioni"	La Quinta Faccia	Ilter Pelosi; Vitaliano Caruso
"E poi e poi"	Laura	Nunzio La Mantia
"Topolino piccolo"	Le Nuove Erbe	Paolo Prencipe; Francesco Specchia
"Senza impegno"	Le Volpi Blu	Franco Delfino; Giuseppe Damele; Michele Motta; Silvio Bordoni
"Sola in due"	Leila Selli	Michele Francesio; Natalina Roccabruna
"Madonna d'amore"	Lorenzo Pilat	Lorenzo Pilat
"Sotto le stelle"	Nannarella	Romolo Balzani
"Io credo"	Nico dei Gabbiani	Francesco Turnaturi; Cadam
"Il ragioniere"	Paola Folzini	Aldo Buonocore; Claudio Celli
"Se nasco un'altra volta"	Paola Musiani	Pino Donaggio; Alberto Testa
"Il telegramma"	Piero Cotto	Pino Donaggio; Vito Pallavicini
"Va' speranza va'"	Rosanna Fratello	Franco Graniero; Giuliano Taddei
"L'incertezza di una vita"	Stefania	Sabino Sciannamea; Francesco Specchia
"Un grande addio"	Valentina Greco	Edilio Capotosti; Maria Cecilia Lacamera; Bruno Broglia; Paolo Limiti

Reserve entries
Song	Artist	Songwriter(s)
"Chiaro"	Alberto Feri	Maria Luisa Nobile
"Ricominciamo da zero"	Angela Bazzi	Musmeci
"Silenzio tra noi"	Theos	Perrino; Lagorio

== Shows ==
The festival consisted of three shows held between 27 February and 1 March 1975. The first two nights were broadcast only on radio and consisted of fifteen songs each. Six songs qualified from each show, creating a final consisting of twelve songs. All three shows were presented by Mike Bongiorno, who was assisted by Sabina Ciuffini. The radio director for the shows was Adriana Parrella, while the television director was Enrico Moscatelli.

The running orders for the first two nights were determined on 20 February at the Mondial Sound recording studio in Milan, where first rehearsals for the festival took place. Rehearsals moved to the festival's venue, the Sanremo Casino, on 23 February.

Enrico Simonetti conducted the orchestra for all performances, also writing the festival's theme song "Sanremo" with Maria Luisa Caravati, which was recorded by Alberto Feri and I Musicals. Recaps of the competing songs were performed by Johnny Sax on saxophone and Piergiorgio Farina on violin throughout the shows.

A gala to raise money for the organisation UNICEF was held on 2 March, a day after the festival's final, in the ballroom of the Sanremo Casino. Performances of the festival's top three songs were featured in the gala, alongside performances from other Italian and international guests, including Gaetano Azzolina, Severino Gazzelloni, Alain Delon and Domenico Modugno. The event was hosted by the actors Rossano Brazzi and Luciana Paluzzi, and was broadcast worldwide, with RAI airing it on 31 March.

=== First night ===
The first night took place on 27 February 1975 at 20:30 CET. Fifteen artists performed their songs and six were selected for the final.

After the juries had voted, three songs tied for fifth place: "Come Humphrey Bogart" performed by Franco e le Piccole Donne, "L'incertezza di una vita" performed by Stefania and "Senza impegno" performed by Le Volpi Blu. Because only six songs could qualify for the final, a draw to break the tie took place, which resulted in Le Volpi Blu's elimination from the competition. The festival's artistic director, Bruno Pallesi, proposed an increase in the number of finalists in order to accompany the group to RAI, but they rejected the proposal.

Qualifier

First night – 27 February 1975
R/O	Song	Artist	Points	Place
1	"Il telegramma"	Piero Cotto	14	2
2	"1975... amore mio"	Emy Cesaroni	—N/a	
3	"Lettera"	Antonella Bellan	—N/a	
4	"Come Humphrey Bogart"	Franco e le Piccole Donne	12	5
5	"E poi e poi"	Laura	14	2
6	"Sei stata tu"	Gianni Migliardi	14	2
7	"Il ragioniere"	Paola Folzini	—N/a	
8	"Oggi"	G.Men	—N/a	
9	"L'incertezza di una vita"	Stefania	12	5
10	"Ipocrisia"	Angela Luce	31	1
11	"Senza impegno"	Le Volpi Blu	12	7
12	"Adesso basti tu"	Gabriella Sanna	—N/a	
13	"Madonna d'amore"	Lorenzo Pilat	—N/a	
14	"Se nasco un'altra volta"	Paola Musiani	—N/a	
15	"In amore non si può mentire"	Eva 2000	—N/a	

=== Second night ===
The second night took place on 28 February 1975 at 20:30 CET. Fifteen artists performed their songs and six were selected for the final.

Qualifier

Second night – 28 February 1975
R/O	Song	Artist	Points	Place
1	"Decidi tu per me"	Eugenio Alberti	17	3
2	"Dolce abitudine"	Daniela	—N/a	
3	"Quattro stagioni"	La Quinta Faccia	—N/a	
4	"Io credo"	Nico dei Gabbiani	13	6
5	"Ragazza del sud"	Gilda	22	1
6	"Tango di casa mia"	Ely Neri	—N/a	
7	"La paura di morire"	Annagloria	—N/a	
8	"Scarafaggi"	Goffredo Canarini	—N/a	
9	"Un grande addio"	Valentina Greco	17	3
10	"Sotto le stelle"	Nannarella	—N/a	
11	"Piccolo bambino caro"	Kriss and Saratoga	—N/a	
12	"Sola in due"	Leila Selli	—N/a	
13	"Innamorarsi"	Jean-François Michael	—N/a	
14	"Va' speranza va'"	Rosanna Fratello	18	2
15	"Topolino piccolo"	Le Nuove Erbe	16	5

=== Final night ===
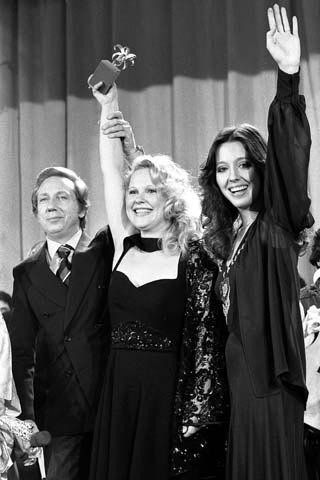
Winning artist Gilda holding her award between presenters Mike Bongiorno and Sabina Ciuffini

The final night took place on 1 March 1975 at 20:40 CET. The twelve finalists performed their songs again, split into two groups, with three artists qualifying from each group to a final round. In the final round, six artists performed their songs for a second time and a winner was chosen.

The show opened with a tribute to the festival's first edition in celebration of its twenty-fifth anniversary, consisting of an introduction from former host Nunzio Filogamo while conductor Cinico Angelini led the orchestra in performing his theme song "C'è una chiesetta".

The winning song was "Ragazza del sud" performed by Gilda, who also wrote and composed the song, becoming the first female songwriter to win the event. Two songs tied for second place: "Ipocrisia" performed by Angela Luce, written by Eduardo Alfieri and Pino Giordano, and "Va' speranza va'" performed by Rosanna Fratello, written by Franco Graniero and Giuliano Taddei.

Qualified for the final round

First round – 1 March 1975
R/O	Song	Artist	Points	Place
1	"Il telegramma"	Piero Cotto	17	4
2	"E poi e poi"	Laura	Qualified	
3	"Topolino piccolo"	Le Nuove Erbe	14	5
4	"Ipocrisia"	Angela Luce	Qualified	
5	"L'incertezza di una vita"	Stefania	11	6
6	"Va' speranza va'"	Rosanna Fratello	Qualified	

Second round – 1 March 1975
R/O	Song	Artist	Points	Place
1	"Decidi tu per me"	Eugenio Alberti	17	4
2	"Ragazza del sud"	Gilda	Qualified	
3	"Sei stata tu"	Gianni Migliardi	15	5
4	"Un grande addio"	Valentina Greco	Qualified	
5	"Come Humphrey Bogart"	Franco e le Piccole Donne	Qualified	
6	"Io credo"	Nico dei Gabbiani	12	6

Winner

Final round – 1 March 1975
R/O	Song	Artist	Points	Place
1	"E poi e poi"	Laura	10	5
2	"Ipocrisia"	Angela Luce	15	2
3	"Va' speranza va'"	Rosanna Fratello	15	2
4	"Ragazza del sud"	Gilda	24	1
5	"Un grande addio"	Valentina Greco	13	4
6	"Come Humphrey Bogart"	Franco e le Piccole Donne	7	6

== Broadcasts ==
=== Local broadcast ===
In February, RAI confirmed they would again only broadcast the festival's final on television, despite attempts from the Sanremo municipal administration and representatives of the Ligurian regional government to secure television coverage for all three shows.

The first two nights were broadcast via radio on Secondo Programma beginning at 20:30 CET. The final was broadcast on both Programma Nazionale (television) and Secondo Programma (radio) beginning at 20:40 CET. The final was broadcast on television in Italy to an estimated 22.7 million viewers.

=== International broadcast ===
The final was broadcast via the Eurovision network in other countries. Known details on the broadcasts in each country, including the specific broadcasting stations and commentators are shown in the tables below.

International broadcasters of the Sanremo Music Festival 1975
Country	Broadcaster	Channel(s)	Commentator(s)	Ref(s)
Chile	UCTV	Canal 13 (Note: Live broadcast at 17:00 (CLST))	Don Francisco	
Chile	UCVTV	Canal 8 UCV TV (Note: Delayed broadcast on 23 March at 20:50 (CLST))		
Greece	EIRT	EIRT (Note: Delayed broadcast on 2 March at 22:40 (EET))		
Romania	TVR	Programul 1 (Note: Delayed broadcast on 16 March.)		
Turkey	TRT	TRT Televizyon		
Yugoslavia	JRT	TV Koper-Capodistria		

== Incidents and controversies ==
=== Call for disqualification of "1975... amore mio" ===
A few days before the start of the festival, the music publishing company Gruppo Editoriale Guerrini called for the disqualification of one of the competing songs, "1975... amore mio" performed by Emy Cesaroni, stating it was in violation of the competition's rules and should be replaced with their song "Chiaro", which had been put first in the reserve list. The company claimed that singer Pietro Grandi performed the song at another live music competition on 7 December 1974 under the title "Io poeta", with only five of the fifty-one words in the lyrics differing from the version recorded by Cesaroni. Both the song's writer and publisher confirmed the December performance, but denied any of the competition's rules were violated, as the song was registered with the collective management organisation Italian Society of Authors and Publishers (SIAE) under two different titles. Shortly before the festival's first night, the municipality of Sanremo decided to reject the appeal on the basis of insufficient evidence, and the song's performance during the show went on as planned.

The dispute was eventually settled in court six years later in 1981, when the song was deemed to be unreleased at the time of the competition and therefore in violation of the rules. As a result, the municipality of Sanremo was sentenced to pay ten million lire in damages to the publishers of "Chiaro", Edizioni Musicali San Giusto.

=== Extortion claims ===
The record label OSI Records, which participated in the festival with a number of its artists, faced multiple accusations of extorting large amounts of money out of artists to guarantee their participation in the festival. After the second night, in which singer Daniela failed to qualify for the final, her mother claimed to have paid an impresario representing the label eight million lire in assurance she would be admitted to the festival's final. The label responded by stating the sum of money only covered the festival's mandatory participation fee in addition to other out-of-pocket expenses unrelated to guaranteeing her admission into the event's final.

=== Vote manipulation attempts ===
As a consequence of the audience jury's reintroduction into the competition, which reserved a portion of the voting jury to randomly drawn members of the audience in the venue, multiple figures within the music industry admitted to attempting to influence the vote by purchasing tickets to the shows. A rumour circulated during the week of the festival that Angela Luce's record label paid for the tickets of one hundred and twenty audience members in exchange for voting for Luce during the first night. In response, the municipality provided documentation of the vote to press proving the outcome had not been affected.

A month after the festival's final, the municipality's treasury confirmed that numerous bounced cheques amounting to fourteen million lire were used by record companies, including OSI Records, to purchase tickets to the show.

== Reception ==
The 1975 edition is considered one of the least successful in the festival's history. At the time, it received little attention from the public; for instance rehearsals were sparsely attended, and as a result of the public's disinterest, future editions of the festival were considered at risk of not being held altogether. The public's growing disinterest in the event was attributed to poor song quality, the lack of comprehensive television coverage and the municipality's mismanagement, which for the 1975 edition, had led to a collective boycott from the majority of major record labels. The songs in the 1975 edition were criticized for not representing contemporary music or showcasing new musical ideas, with the competition's results exemplifying the issue. As a consequence, the event failed to amount to any significant commercial success.

The winner, Gilda, only achieved local recognition prior to her win, and had unsuccessfully attempted to participate in the festival in previous years, managing to make the reserve list in 1973 with her song "Aspetta". Following her win with "Ragazza del sud", the song faced criticism for its anti-feminist lyrics and negative portrayal of southern Italy. The win failed to bring her mainstream fame, and she retired from her professional music career only a few years after winning the festival, eventually dedicating her career to managing a hotel in Turin.
