= Sanremo Music Festival 1974 =

Italian song contest (24th edition)

Dates and venue
- First night: 7 March 1974
- Second night: 8 March 1974
- Final night: 9 March 1974
- Venue: Sanremo Casino; Sanremo, Italy

Organisation
- Organisers: Gianni Ravera; Elio Gigante; Vittorio Salvetti

Production
- Broadcaster: Radiotelevisione italiana (RAI)
- Directors: Adriana Parrella; Enrico Moscatelli
- Presenters: Corrado and Gabriella Farinon

Vote
- Number of entries: 28
- Winner: "Ciao cara, come stai?" Iva Zanicchi

The Sanremo Music Festival 1974 (Italian: Festival di Sanremo 1974), officially the 24th Italian Song Festival (24º Festival della canzone italiana), was the 24th annual Sanremo Music Festival, held at the Sanremo Casino in Sanremo between 7 and 9 March 1974. It was organised by Gianni Ravera, Elio Gigante and Vittorio Salvetti, and broadcast by Radiotelevisione italiana (RAI). The shows were presented by Corrado, assisted by Gabriella Farinon.

The winning song was "Ciao cara, come stai?" performed by Iva Zanicchi, and written by Cristiano Malgioglio, Italo Ianne, Dinaro and Daiano.

== Format ==
In November 1973, Sanremo's administration decided the organisation of the festival's 1974 edition would be entrusted to a third party rather than directly handled by the municipality of Sanremo. They justified their decision by claiming that the festival had not seen improvement during the previous two editions under the municipality's management. Former artistic directors of the festival, Gianni Ravera, Vittorio Salvetti, Elio Gigante and Ezio Radaelli, were contacted to submit proposals to organise the event. Following a dispute between the municipal council over the choice of Salvetti and a joint proposal by Ravera and Gigante, all three were entrusted with the festival's organisation. Unsatisfied with the decision, the three signed a letter sent to the municipality on 19 January 1974 communicating their intention not to organise the festival under any condition. However, the following day they accepted a new offer to organise the event.

The festival was initially scheduled to take place between 21 and 23 February of 1974, but following delays in its organisation, the dates were moved to 7, 8 and 9 March 1974.

For the first time, competing entries in the festival were split between big and newcomer artists. Newcomers performed during the first two nights facing elimination from the competition, while big artists automatically gained a place in the final, performing their songs during the first two nights without being subject to a vote.

=== Voting system ===
The voting system for this edition was agreed upon by the festival's organisers and union representatives. Fourteen juries located in different Italian cities voted in each show, but only six were drawn at random and used to determine the results. Juries were composed of thirty members, each with one vote. After the first two nights, the four newcomer artists that received the most votes advanced to the final. In the final, only the winner was announced, all other finalists declared tied runners-up and the full ranking never revealed.

== Competing entries ==
A total of 137 songs were submitted for the competition by the deadline on 17 February. The festival's competing entries were divided into two categories: big and newcomer artists. A nine-member special commission including students, musicians and record producers were tasked with selecting fourteen submissions for the big artists section and twelve submissions for the newcomers section. The song selection process took place in the Hotel Astoria in Sanremo and was recorded via closed-circuit television cameras, able to viewed live by journalists and record producers. The artists competing in the big artists section were invited beforehand by the festival's organisers, with their entries formally selected by the commission on 20 February and announced on the same day. For the newcomers section, the commission selected fourteen songs instead of the intended number of twelve, which were then paired with artists proposed by record labels and announced on 21 February.

Competing entries – Big Artists
Song	Artist	Songwriter(s)
"In controluce"	Al Bano	Albano Carrisi; Paolo Limiti
"Questa è la mia vita"	Domenico Modugno	Domenico Modugno; Elide Suligoj; Luciano Beretta
"A modo mio"	Gianni Nazzaro	Claudio Baglioni; Antonio Coggio
"Senza titolo"	Gilda Giuliani	Alfredo Ferrari; Vito Pallavicini; Gino Mescoli
"Ciao cara, come stai?"	Iva Zanicchi	Cristiano Malgioglio; Italo Ianne; Dinaro; Daiano
"Mon ami Tango"	Les Charlots	Lorenzo Pilat; Corrado Conti; Daniele Pace; Mario Panzeri
"Cavalli bianchi"	Little Tony	Giulifan; Bruno Casu; Miro
"Sole giallo"	Middle of the Road	Pino Donaggio; Maurizio Piccoli
"Monica delle bambole"	Milva	Elide Suligoj; Luciano Beretta
"Innamorati"	Mino Reitano	Franco Reitano; Mino Reitano; Luciano Beretta
"Ah! L'amore"	Mouth and MacNeal	Enzo Lombardo; Gilberto Sebastianelli; Ermanno Capelli
"Il matto del villaggio"	Nicola Di Bari	Claudio Mattone; Piero Pintucci; Franco Migliacci
"Occhi rossi"	Orietta Berti	Mario Panzeri; Lorenzo Pilat; Corrado Conti; Daniele Pace
"Un po' di coraggio"	Rosanna Fratello	Antonio Ruggero Mancino; Dante Pieretti

Competing entries – Newcomers
Song	Artist	Songwriter(s)
"Sta piovendo dolcemente"	Anna Melato	Pino Donaggio; Maurizio Piccoli
"Per una donna, donna"	Antonella Bottazzi	Antonella Bottazzi
"Se hai paura"	Domodossola	Massimo Guantini; Roberto Soffici; Luigi Albertelli
"Capelli sciolti"	Donatella Rettore	Mario Pagano; Donatella Rettore
"Il mio volo bianco"	Emanuela Cortesi	Daiano; Italo Ianne; Flavio Zanon
"Fiume grande"	Franco Simone	Franco Simone
"Canta con me"	Kambiz	Enrico Riccardi; Luigi Albertelli
"La canta"	Orchestra Spettacolo Casadei	Raoul Casadei; Enrico Muccioli; Al Pedulli
"La donna quando pensa"	Paola Musiani	Mauro Galati; Ermanno Capelli
"Valentin tango"	Piero Focaccia	Edilio Capotosti; Luciano Beretta
"Complici"	Riccardo Fogli	Luigi Lopez; Carla Vistarini
"Qui"	Rossella	Riccardo Cocciante; Marco Luberti; Amerigo Cassella
"Ricomincerei"	Sonia Gigliola Conti	Piero Soffici; Dante Pieretti
"Notte dell'estate"	Valentina Greco	Albino Mammoliti; Aldo Buonocore; Claudio Celli

== Shows ==
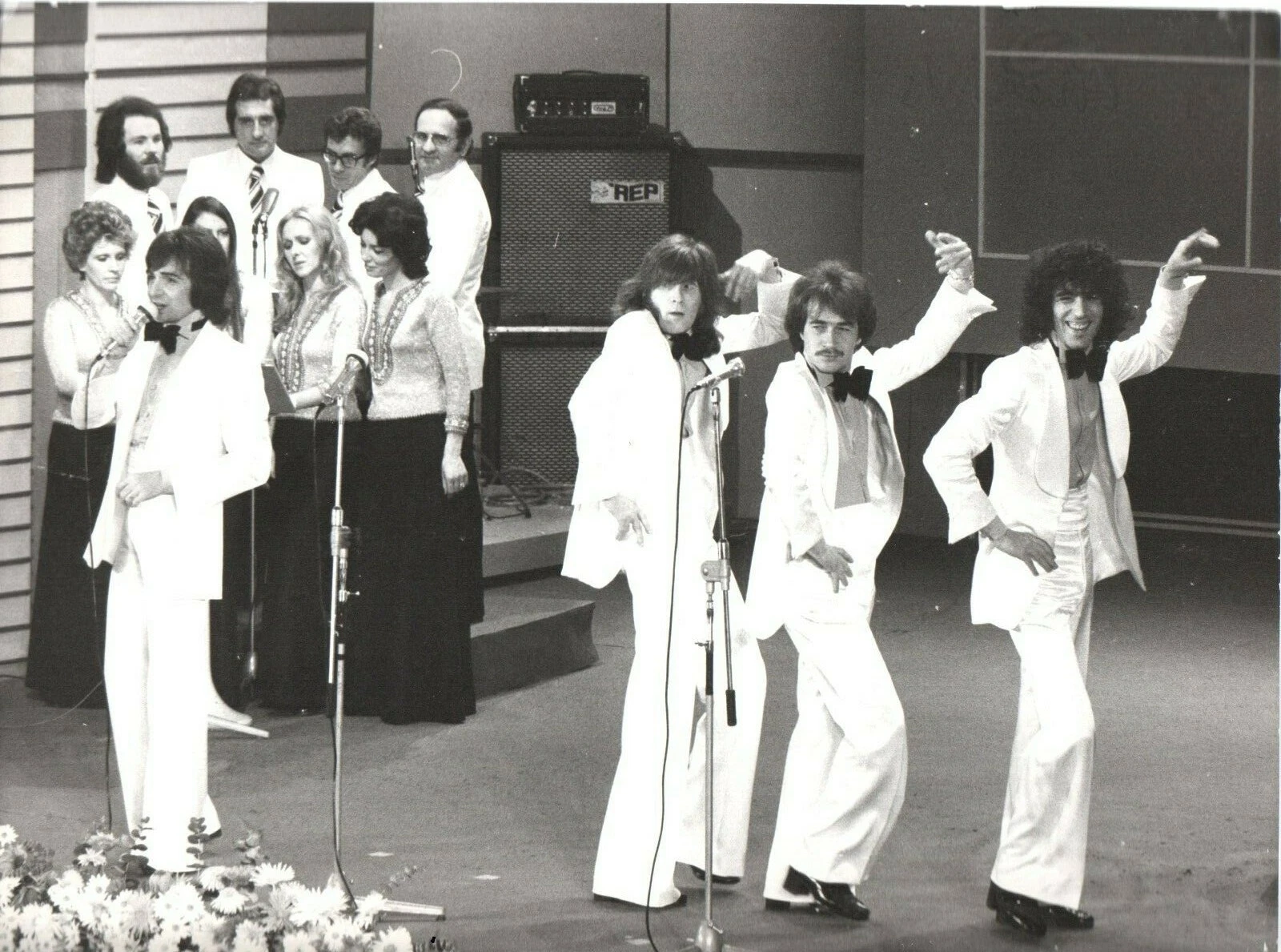
French group Les Charlots performing at the festival

The festival consisted of three shows held between 7 and 9 March 1974. The first two nights were broadcast only on radio and consisted of fourteen songs each, split equally between songs by big and newcomer artists. Four songs by newcomers qualified from the first two nights to join the fourteen big artists in the final, creating a total of eighteen songs. A draw to decide the running order for the first two nights took place during rehearsals in Milan on 28 February.

All shows were presented by Corrado, who was assisted by Gabriella Farinon. The radio director for the shows was Adriana Parrella, while the television director was Enrico Moscatelli.

=== First night ===
The first night took place on 7 March 1974 at 20:40 CET. Seven newcomers and seven big artists performed their songs.

Qualifier

Newcomers – 7 March 1974
R/O	Song	Artist	Points	Rank
1	"Notte dell'estate"	Valentina Greco	39	3
2	"Se hai paura"	Domodossola	40	2
3	"Capelli sciolti"	Donatella Rettore	10	11
4	"Canta con me"	Kambiz	31	7
5	"Qui"	Rossella	8	12
6	"La canta"	Orchestra Spettacolo Casadei	36	5
7	"Ricomincerei"	Sonia Gigliola Conti	16	10

Big Artists – 7 March 1974
R/O	Song	Artist
1	"A modo mio"	Gianni Nazzaro
2	"Senza titolo"	Gilda Giuliani
3	"Il matto del villaggio"	Nicola Di Bari
4	"Ah! L'amore"	Mouth and MacNeal
5	"Cavalli bianchi"	Little Tony
6	"Un po' di coraggio"	Rosanna Fratello
7	"In controluce"	Al Bano

=== Second night ===
The second night took place on 8 March 1974 at 20:40 CET. Seven newcomers and seven big artists performed their songs. The four newcomers that received the most points from the jury across the first two nights were selected for the final.

Qualifier

Newcomers – 8 March 1974
R/O	Song	Artist	Points	Rank
1	"Il mio volo bianco"	Emanuela Cortesi	49	1
2	"Valentin tango"	Piero Focaccia	25	8
3	"La donna quando pensa"	Paola Musiani	3	14
4	"Fiume grande"	Franco Simone	35	6
5	"Per una donna, donna"	Antonella Bottazzi	4	13
6	"Complici"	Riccardo Fogli	25	8
7	"Sta piovendo dolcemente"	Anna Melato	39	3

Big Artists – 8 March 1974
R/O	Song	Artist
1	"Occhi rossi"	Orietta Berti
2	"Innamorati"	Mino Reitano
3	"Mon ami Tango"	Les Charlots
4	"Ciao cara, come stai?"	Iva Zanicchi
5	"Questa è la mia vita"	Domenico Modugno
6	"Sole giallo"	Middle of the Road
7	"Monica delle bambole"	Milva

=== Final night ===
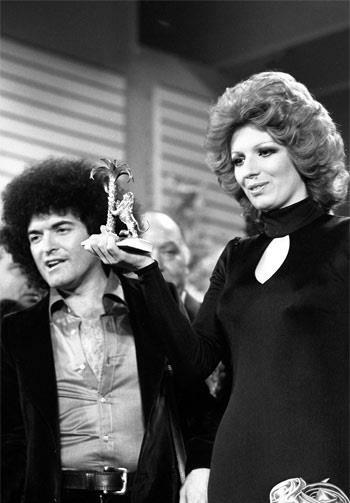
Winning performer Iva Zanicchi holding the first prize next to songwriter Cristiano Malgioglio

The final night took place on 9 March 1974 at 20:40 CET. The eighteen finalists performed their songs again and a winner was chosen. A pre-recorded stand-up comedy routine performed by Walter Chiari was featured in the show before the announcement of the winner.

The winning song was "Ciao cara, come stai?" written by Cristiano Malgioglio, Italo Ianne, Dinaro and Daiano, and performed by Iva Zanicchi. This marked Zanicchi's third victory at the festival following her wins in 1967 and 1969, making her the female performer with the most victories. Although only the winning song was announced officially, rumours since the event suggest "Questa è la mia vita" performed by Domenico Modugno placed second and "Occhi rossi" performed by Orietta Berti placed third.

Winner

Final night – 9 March 1974
R/O	Song	Artist
1	"Un po' di coraggio"	Rosanna Fratello
2	"Cavalli bianchi"	Little Tony
3	"Senza titolo"	Gilda Giuliani
4	"Sole giallo"	Middle of the Road
5	"Occhi rossi"	Orietta Berti
6	"Il matto del villaggio"	Nicola Di Bari
7	"Mon ami Tango"	Les Charlots
8	"Notte dell'estate"	Valentina Greco
9	"A modo mio"	Gianni Nazzaro
10	"Questa è la mia vita"	Domenico Modugno
11	"Monica delle bambole"	Milva
12	"Innamorati"	Mino Reitano
13	"Se hai paura"	Domodossola
14	"Il mio volo bianco"	Emanuela Cortesi
15	"In controluce"	Al Bano
16	"Sta piovendo dolcemente"	Anna Melato
17	"Ah! L'amore"	Mouth and MacNeal
18	"Ciao cara, come stai?"	Iva Zanicchi

== Broadcasts ==
=== Local broadcast ===
The first two nights were broadcast via radio on Secondo Programma beginning at 20:40 CET. The final night was broadcast on both Programma Nazionale (television) and Secondo Programma (radio) at 20:40 CET. The final was broadcast on television in Italy to an estimated 23.2 million viewers.

=== International broadcast ===
The final was broadcast via the Eurovision network in other countries. It was also broadcast live in cinemas throughout the United States and Canada. Known details on the broadcasts in each country, including the specific broadcasting stations and commentators are shown in the tables below.

International broadcasters of the Sanremo Music Festival 1974
Country	Broadcaster	Channel(s)	Commentator(s)	Ref(s)
Argentina	Río de la Plata TV	Canal 13 (Note: Deferred broadcast the day of the final at 20:00 (ART))	Cacho Fontana	
Argentina	Rivadavia Televisión	Tevedos	Cacho Fontana	
Chile	UCTV	Canal 13 (Note: Delayed broadcast on 17 March at 22:00 (CLST))	Pepe Guixé	
Greece	EIRT	EIRT (Note: Delayed broadcast on 10 March at 21:50 (EET))		
Hungary	MTV	MTV1 (Note: Delayed broadcast on 20 April at 20:45 (CET))		
South Korea	MBC (Note: Delayed broadcast on 2 June at 22:20 (KST))		Lee Hae-seong	
Turkey	TRT	TRT Televizyon		
Turkey	TRT	İl radyosu (Note: Delayed broadcast in a shortened format on 11 July at 16:00 (EEST))		
Yugoslavia	JRT	TV Beograd 1 (Note: Deferred broadcast on Radio Belgrade 1 the day of the final at 22:35 (CEST))		
Yugoslavia	JRT	TV Koper-Capodistria		
Yugoslavia	JRT	Radio Belgrade 1		

== Incidents and controversies ==
=== Attempt to increase the number of finalists ===
On 6 March, the festival's organisers received a letter from record labels requesting the number of spots in the final for newcomer artists be raised from four to six. The organisers considered the request, but in order to accommodate the extra performances, needed approval from RAI to extend the broadcast time. After the second night concluded, the Orchestra Spettacolo Casadei, who placed fifth in the newcomers ranking, was stopped by the traffic police on their way back to Emilia-Romagna and informed by one of the organisers, Vittorio Salvetti, that they would perform again in the final. However, RAI refused to extend the event’s broadcast time and the idea was abandoned. Leader of the group, Raoul Casadei, stated he would never participate in the festival again as a result of the incident.
