= List of number-one hits of 1977 (Italy) =

This is a list of the number-one hits of 1977 on Italian Hit Parade Singles Chart.

== Chart history ==
Issue date	Song	Artist(s)
January 1	"Sei forte papà"	Gianni Morandi
January 8	"Sei forte papà"	Gianni Morandi
January 15	"Sei forte papà"	Gianni Morandi
January 22	"Sei forte papà"	Gianni Morandi
January 29	"Sei forte papà"	Gianni Morandi
February 5	"Sei forte papà"	Gianni Morandi
February 12	"Sei forte papà"	Gianni Morandi
February 19	"Honky Tonky Train Blues"	Keith Emerson
February 26	"Furia"	Mal
March 5	"Furia"	Mal
March 12	"Furia"	Mal
March 19	"Furia"	Mal
March 26	"Honky Tonky Train Blues"	Keith Emerson
April 2	"Honky Tonky Train Blues"	Keith Emerson
April 9	"Honky Tonky Train Blues"	Keith Emerson
April 16	"Tu mi rubi l'anima"	Collage
April 23	"Tu mi rubi l'anima"	Collage
April 30	"Tu mi rubi l'anima"	Collage
May 7	"Amarsi un po'"	Lucio Battisti
May 14	"Amarsi un po'"	Lucio Battisti
May 21	"Amarsi un po'"	Lucio Battisti
May 28	"Amarsi un po'"	Lucio Battisti
June 4	"Amarsi un po'"	Lucio Battisti
June 11	"Amarsi un po'"	Lucio Battisti
June 18	"Amarsi un po'"	Lucio Battisti
June 25	"Amarsi un po'"	Lucio Battisti
July 2	"Rocky'"	Maynard Ferguson
July 9	"Rocky'"	Maynard Ferguson
July 16	"I Feel Love'"	Donna Summer
July 23	"Ti amo'"	Umberto Tozzi
July 30	"Ti amo'"	Umberto Tozzi
August 6	"Ti amo'"	Umberto Tozzi
August 13	"Ti amo'"	Umberto Tozzi
August 20	"Ti amo'"	Umberto Tozzi
August 27	"Ti amo'"	Umberto Tozzi
September 3	"Ti amo'"	Umberto Tozzi
September 10	"Ti amo'"	Umberto Tozzi
September 17	"Ti amo'"	Umberto Tozzi
September 24	"Ti amo'"	Umberto Tozzi
October 1	"Ti amo'"	Umberto Tozzi
October 8	"Ti amo'"	Umberto Tozzi
October 15	"Ti amo'"	Umberto Tozzi
October 22	"L'angelo azzurro'"	Umberto Balsamo
October 29	"Tomorrow'"	Amanda Lear
November 5	"Don't Let Me Be Misunderstood'"	Santa Esmeralda
November 12	"Don't Let Me Be Misunderstood'"	Santa Esmeralda
November 19	"Don't Let Me Be Misunderstood'"	Santa Esmeralda
November 26	"L'angelo azzurro'"	Umberto Balsamo
December 3	"Don't Let Me Be Misunderstood'"	Santa Esmeralda
December 10	"Solo tu"	Matia Bazar
December 17	"Solo tu"	Matia Bazar
December 24	"Solo tu"	Matia Bazar
December 31	"Solo tu"	Matia Bazar

== Number-one artists ==
Position	Artist	Weeks #1
1	Umberto Tozzi	13
2	Lucio Battisti	8
3	Gianni Morandi	7
4	Keith Emerson	4
4	Mal	4
4	Matia Bazar	4
4	Santa Esmeralda	4
5	Collage	3
6	Maynard Ferguson	2
7	Amanda Lear	1
7	Donna Summer	1
7	Umberto Balsamo	1
