= Balla (song) =

Single by Umberto Balsamo

from the album Balla
- B-side: "Donna"
- Released: 1979
- Length: 3:15
- Label: Phonogram
- Songwriter(s): Umberto Balsamo

Umberto Balsamo singles chronology
"Crepuscolo" (1978)	"Balla" (1979)	"Il giorno" (1980)

Audio
- "Balla" on YouTube

"Balla" ('Dance!') is a 1979 Italian song composed and performed by Umberto Balsamo.

== Overview ==
Balsamo composed the song, a mixture of pop and tarantella, in London, where was recording his album. Its lyrics mainly consist of images from his childhood days. Balsamo had to fight with Phonogram to release the song as a single, even to the point that Phonogram threatened to have his contract terminated, as the label considered tarantella a poorly marketable genre with no selling potential and was pressing for Balsamo to have a song in the style of his previous hit "L'angelo azzurro".

The song has been described as "a real classic [...] where the rhythmic elements capture [the listener], in their regular and hypnotic procession repeated even in the lyrics of the refrain".

== Track listing ==
No.	Title	Writer(s)	Length
1.	"Balla"	Umberto Balsamo	3:15
2.	"Donna"	Umberto Balsamo	4:00

== Charts ==
Chart performance for "Balla"
Chart (1979)	Peak position
Italy (Musica e dischi)	4
