= Azzolina =

Azzolina is an Italian surname. Notable people with the surname include:

- Gaetano Azzolina (1931–2023), Italian doctor and politician
- Jay Azzolina (born 1952), American jazz musician
- Joseph Azzolina (1926–2010), American politician
- Lucia Azzolina (born 1982), Italian politician
