= Raoul Casadei =

Italian musician (1937–2021)

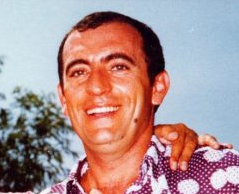
- Casadei in 1971
- Born: 15 August 1937; Gatteo, Kingdom of Italy
- Died: 13 March 2021 (aged 83); Cesena, Italy
- Occupation: Bandleader
- Musical career
- Genres: Liscio

Raoul Casadei (15 August 1937 – 13 March 2021) was an Italian bandleader, composer and musician. The leader for about 40 years of Orchestra Casadei, he was nicknamed "Re del Liscio" ('King of Liscio').

== Life and career ==
Born in Gatteo, the nephew of the composer Secondo, Casadei started performing in the late 1950s in his uncle orchestra, which a few years later was renamed "Orchestra Secondo e Raoul Casadei". In 1971, with the death of Secondo, Casadei became the bandleader of the orchestra, improving in a few years its success with the hit "Ciao mare" and with the participation in the major festivals of the time, including Festivalbar, Un disco per l'estate and the 24th edition of the Sanremo Music Festival. Also a television theme songs composer, because of his popularity he played himself in films and starred in commercials and fotoromanzi. In 2006 he took part in the reality show L'isola dei famosi. In 2013, in collaboration with Paolo Gambi, he released his memoirs, Bastava un grillo (per farci sognare). A graduate of the Istituto Magistrale, besides his musical activities he served as a school teacher for seventeen years.

Casadei died in the Cesena hospital of complications from COVID-19 on 13 March 2021, at the age of 83.
