= Franco Califano =

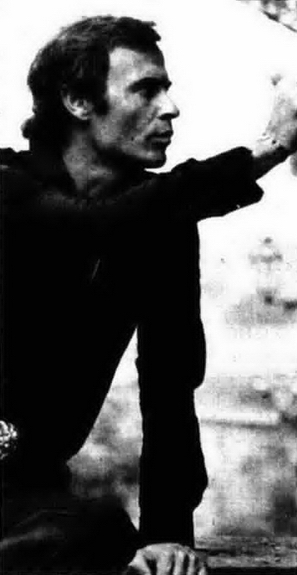
- Califano in 1973

Background information
- Born: Francesco Califano; 14 September 1938; Tripoli, Italian Libya
- Origin: Rome, Italy
- Died: 30 March 2013 (aged 74) Acilia, Rome, Italy
- Genres: Easy; pop
- Occupations: Singer; songwriter; record producer; actor
- Years active: 1960–2013
- Website: francocalifano.it

Francesco "Franco" Califano (14 September 1938 – 30 March 2013) was an Italian singer, songwriter, record producer and actor. His songs sold about 20 million records during his career.

== Early life ==
Born in an airplane above Tripoli, Libya, Califano lived most of his life in Rome (in whose dialect he usually sang) and Milan.

== Music career ==
In the 1960s, he began his career in music as a lyricist and a record producer; among his first successes as author "La musica è finita", "E la chiamano estate", "Una ragione di più".

He was arrested in 1970 and again 1984 for possession of drugs; in both cases, Califano was acquitted with the formula "because the fact does not exist". In 1976, Califano got his first and main success as a singer with the song "Tutto il resto è noia", included in his eponymous fourth album, for which the critics paired him to the traditional French chansonniers. During these years he continued his activity as lyricist signing, among others, the Sanremo Music Festival 1973 winner "Un grande amore e niente più" (performed by Peppino di Capri) and the Mia Martini's classic "Minuetto"; he also composed a whole album for Mina, Amanti di valore. In 1978, he released his best-sold album, Tac.

In 1988, he entered the Sanremo Music Festival with the autobiographical song "Io per le strade di quartiere"; he came back to Sanremo two more times, in 1994 with "Napoli" and in 2005 with "Non escludo il ritorno".

== Books ==
He was author of several books, including the autobiographical Senza manette and Il cuore nel sesso. He also starred in several genre films, and had the leading roles in the poliziottesco Gardenia and in the comedy film Due strani papà.

== Death ==
He died of a heart attack in his house in Acilia.

== Discography ==
- 'N bastardo venuto dar sud (1972)
- Ma che piagni a ffa' (1973)
- L'evidenza dell'autunno (1973)
- Io me 'mbriaco (1975)
- Secondo me, l'amore... (1975)
- 24-7-75 dalla Bussola, live at La Bussola in Viareggio (1975)
- Tutto il resto è noia (1976)
- Tac...! (1977)
- Bastardo l'autunno e l'amore (1977, collection)
- Ti perdo (1979)
- Tuo Califano (1980)
- La mia libertà (1981)
- Ritratto di Franco Califano (1981, collection)
- Buio e luna piena (1982)
- In concerto dal Blue Moon di Ogliastro Marina (1982, live)
- Io per amarti (1983)
- Super Califfo (1983, collection )
- Impronte digitali (1984)
- Ma cambierà (1985)
- Il bello della vita (1987)
- Io (1988)
- Coppia dove vai (1989)
- Califano (1990)
- Se il teatro è pieno (1991)
- In concerto dal Blue Moon di Ogliastro Marina 2 (1992, live)
- Ma io vivo (1994)
- Giovani uomini (1995)
- Tu nell'intimità (1999)
- Stasera canto io (2001, live)
- Vive chi vive (2001, EP)
- Luci della notte (2003)
- Non escludo il ritorno (2005, collection)
- C'è bisogno d'amore (2009)

== Filmography ==
Film
Year	Title	Role(s)	Director	Notes
1960	Appuntamento a Ischia	Mimmo's Double Bass Player	Mario Mattoli	
1962	Appuntamento in riviera	Himself	Mario Mattoli	Cameo
1963	Notti nude	Himself	Ettore Fecchi	Documentary
1964	Cherchez l'idole	The director	Michel Boisrond	
1979	Gardenia	Gardenia	Domenico Paolella	
1983	Due strani papà	Franco	Mariano Laurenti	
1998	Viola Kisses Everybody	Samuele's father	Giovanni Veronesi	
2008	This Night Is Still Ours	Franco Cicchillitti	Paolo Genovese	
2012	Roma nuda	Romo Sebastiani	Giuseppe Ferrara	Final film role
