= Secondo Casadei =

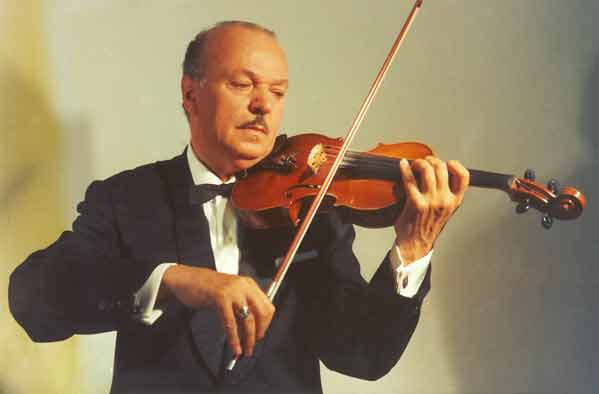

Background information
- Birth name: Aurelio Casadei
- Also known as: Secondo Casadei
- Born: 1 April 1906; Sant'Angelo di Gatteo, Italy
- Died: 19 November 1971 (aged 65); Forlimpopoli, Italy
- Genres: Liscio
- Occupation(s): Musician, violinist, composer, arranger, bandleader
- Instrument: Violin
- Years active: 1924–1970
- Labels: Casadei Sonora
- Website: www.secondocasadei.it

Aurelio Casadei, known as Secondo Casadei (1 April 1906 – 19 November 1971) was an Italian musician, violinist, arranger, composer and bandleader. He is considered the most important exponent of liscio (literally "smooth"), an Italian style of dance and folk music born in Emilia-Romagna.

Casadei is best known for being the author of the famous popular song "Romagna mia". His nephew is the musician and composer Raoul Casadei.
