= Editoriale Campi =

- Company type: s.r.l.
- Industry: Publishing house
- Founded: 1892; 134 years ago as Tipografia Giuseppe Campi
- Headquarters: Spello
- Products: Almanac, Calendar

Editoriale Campi is an Italian publishing house, primarily known as the publisher of the Barbanera almanac and calendar.

== History ==
It was founded in 1892 in Foligno by Giuseppe Campi. From its very early years the business specialised in popular publications such as the "pianeti della fortuna” (the planets of fortune) (predictions printed on coloured sheets) or leaflets recounting miraculous facts and current events in rhyme, all editions that used to be distributed at fairs and markets by street vendors. In the 1930s it became the main Italian producer of musical scores, leaflets with the lyrics of the hit songs from radio and television. In 1952, on the initiative of Agostino Campi, Giuseppe's son, the first Italian music magazine came out: "Sorrisi e Canzoni d’Italia", later "TV Sorrisi e Canzoni". Since the mid 1900s the publishing house has held the exclusive rights to the Barbanera trademark.

For its long history, Editoriale Campi srl is registered in the prestigious Register of historical Italian companies which can be consulted on the Unioncamere website.
