= Paola Musiani =

Italian singer (1949–1985)

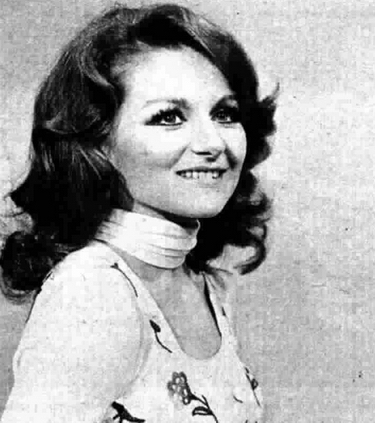
- Born: 25 November 1949; Vignola, Modena, Italy
- Died: 8 January 1985 (aged 35); Bologna, Italy
- Occupation: Singer

Paola Musiani (25 November 1949 – 8 January 1985) was an Italian singer.

== Life and career ==
Musiani was born in Vignola, in the Province of Modena. At the age of 16, while making her accountancy studies, Musiani started singing in the dance halls of her region.

In 1966, after taking part in a singing contest with a cover version of The Monkees' "I'm a Believer", she was put under contract by CBS. In 1967, Musiani got her first success with "Ode per Billie Joe", a cover version of Bobbie Gentry's "Ode to Billie Joe". In the following years, she took part to the most important musical events in Italy, including Canzonissima, Cantagiro, Festivalbar and two editions of the Sanremo Music Festival, in 1974 and 1975.

Musiani later became active on stage as an operetta singer and actress, before dying prematurely, aged 35, because of a car crash in the Autostrada del Sole.

== Discography ==
=== Album ===
- 1972: Dedicato a Paola
- 1984: Trapianto (as La Musiani)

=== Singles ===
- 1967: La facciata A/Dipingi un mondo per me (CBS, 2727)
- 1967: Ode per Billie Joe/Con la tua mamma (CBS, 3027)
- 1968: Un ragazzo che sogna/Promesse (CBS, 3513)
- 1969: Tu dormirai/Se vuoi cadere in piedi (CBS, 4171)
- 1969: Deserto/La principessa non canta più (CBS, 4280)
- 1970: Faccia da schiaffi/Cosa vuoi cuore mio (Bentler, BE/NP 5066)
- 1971: Noi/Le mie pazza scale (Bentler, BE/NP 5077)
- 1971: Il nostro concerto/Adesso che mi manchi tu (Bentler, BE/NP 5079)
- 1972: Passerà/La mia strana vita (Bentler, BE/NP 5082)
- 1972: Tocco magico/Alone again (Bentler, BE/NP 5086)
- 1972: Tu eri il mio bene/Amore immenso (Bentler, BE/NP 5088)
- 1973: Tango della gelosia/Davanti a Dio (Bentler, BE/NP 5089)
- 1974: La donna quando pensa/L'ultima spiaggia (Bentler, BE/NP-5091)
- 1975: Se nasco un’altra volta/Chiaro (Bentler, BE/NP-5099)
- 1978: Se/Vieni adesso (Bella Record, ZBN 10002)
- 1979: Quello che ci vuole per me/ (Space, ZSB 00102)
- 1982: Lassame sta'/E' amare (Effe Proposta, EP-005)
- 1983: Fastidio/Curiosità (F1 Team, P 7301)
