= Barbanera =

Italian almanac

Barbanera Almanac and Calendar
- Categories: Almanacs, weather, astronomy, calendar, gardening, cooking, moon phases
- Frequency: Annual
- Publisher: Editoriale Campi
- Founded: 1762
- Country: Italy
- Based in: Spello
- Language: Italian
- Website: http://www.barbanera.it

Barbanera is a famous Italian almanac, printed for the first time in 1762 and still published yearly today.

== Contents ==
Since the first edition, the Barbanera has been issued in the form of a wall calendar and paperback almanac. In addition to the calendar for that year, it traditionally proposes weather forecasts, information about lunar phases and the stars, curious facts, proverbs, gardening tips and advice for a healthy lifestyle. All contents are inspired by the figure of a legendary astronomer and philosopher, depicted in different editions with a long black beard.

== Success over the years ==
Because of its popularity, Barbanera is referred to by the most respected Italian dictionaries as a synonym for almanac. An essential, both secular and religious guide for generations of Italians, it has carried out the task of spreading knowledge in the fields of technology and agriculture throughout the centuries. Gabriele D'Annunzio defined it "the flower of all time and the wisdom of nations".

== Barbanera in the UNESCO Memory of the World ==
Through the collection of almanacs conserved in the Fondazione Barbanera 1762, Barbanera has been part of the documentary heritage of humanity since 2015, referred to by UNESCO in the Memory of the World international register as "symbol of a literary genre, which helped to create the mass culture and identity-making heritage of entire nations, up until the advent of more modern forms of mass communication".
