= Gilda Giuliani =

Italian singer (born 1954)

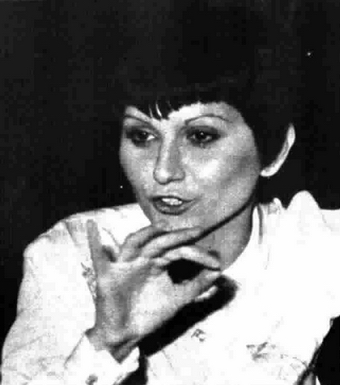

Background information
- Born: 19 June 1954 (age 71); Termoli, Italy
- Occupation: Singer
- Years active: 1972–present

Gilda Giuliani (born 19 June 1954) is an Italian singer, mainly successful in the 1970s.

== Life and career ==
Born in Termoli, Campobasso, Italy, after some experiences as a chorist in 1972 Giuliani won "Due voci per Sanremo", a contest organized by TV Sorrisi e Canzoni which got her the chance to compete at the 23rd edition of the Sanremo Music Festival. Her song "Serena" was a hit and launched her career, with her vocal style being compared to Mireille Mathieu's and receiving large critical acclaim.

In December the same year, she also competed at the World Popular Song Festival in Tokyo, winning both the Grand Prix and the Most Outstanding Performance Award with the song "Parigi a Volte Cosa Fa". From the mid-1970s she slowed her activities, focusing her career on international appearances.

After a period of silence, in the 1990s Giuliani was a regular in the RAI musical programs hosted by Paolo Limiti.

== Discography ==
Album

- 1973 – Gilda Giuliani
- 1974 – Oggi un anno
- 1974 – Si ricomincia
- 1974 – Chanson pour toi
- 1975 – Senza titolo
- 1976 – È questione di pelle
- 1976 – Tempo di felicità
- 1976 – Donna
- 1983 – Portami con te (Q-disc)
- 1996 – Serena
- 2000 – Canzoni d'amore
- 2005 – Dominò
- 2010 – Canto Mimì
