= Naughty Nun =

1972 film by Mariano Laurenti

- Directed by: Mariano Laurenti
- Written by: Carlo Veo
- Starring: Edwige Fenech
- Cinematography: Tino Santoni
- Music by: Berto Pisano
- Release date: 1972
- Country: Italy
- Language: Italian

Naughty Nun (Italian: La bella Antonia, prima monica e poi dimonia, lit. 'Beautiful Antonia, First a Nun Then a Demon') is a 1972 Italian commedia sexy all'italiana directed by Mariano Laurenti.

== Cast ==
- Edwige Fenech: Antonia
- Piero Focaccia: Painter Claudio Fornari
- Dada Gallotti: Domicilla
- Riccardo Garrone: Giovanni Piccolomini
- Malisa Longo: Caterina
- Luciana Turina: Madre badessa
- Umberto D'Orsi: Domenico Mincaglia
- Lucretia Love: Ippolita
- Tiberio Murgia: Fra' Filippuccio
- Elio Crovetto: Fra' Pomponio

== Production ==
The film was a co-production between Flora Film, Lea Film, and National Cinematografica. It was shot between Gubbio and Elios Studios in Rome.

== Release ==
The film was released in Italian cinemas by Variety on 23 August 1972. Almost two years after its release, on 8 July 1974, Catanzaro praetor Donato Massimo Bartolomei banned the film for breaching the decency code; his ruling was overturned on 5 August 1974.

== Reception ==
Domestically the film grossed about 520 million lire. Leonardo Autera on Corriere della Sera described it as a film "bordering on pornography and stuffed to the point of boredom with the heaviest profanity", with Laurenti's direction "at the extreme end of technical illiteracy".
