= Blood and Roses =

1960 film

- Theatrical release poster
- Directed by: Roger Vadim
- Screenplay by: Claude Brulé; Claude Martin; Roger Vadim
- Based on: Carmilla by Sheridan Le Fanu
- Produced by: Raymond Eger
- Starring: Mel Ferrer; Elsa Martinelli; Annette Vadim; Alberto Bonucci; Gaby Farinon; R. J. Chauffard; Serge Marquand; Edith Arlene Peters; Marc Allégret
- Cinematography: Claude Renoir
- Edited by: Victoria Mercanton
- Music by: Jean Prodromides
- Production companies: Films EGE; Documento Film
- Distributed by: Paramount Pictures
- Release dates: 14 September 1960 (France); January 1961 (Rome)
- Running time: 87 minutes
- Countries: France; Italy
- Box office: 1,205,106 admissions (France)

Blood and Roses (French: ...Et mourir de plaisir (Le sang et la rose), lit. '...And die of pleasure (The blood and the rose)') is a 1960 erotic horror film directed by Roger Vadim. It is based on the novella Carmilla (1872) by Irish writer Sheridan Le Fanu, shifting the book's setting in 19th-century Styria to the film's 20th-century Italy. This film was conceived in both French and English-language versions, with the principal actors shooting their scenes in both languages.

== Plot ==
Set in the 1960s at an Italian estate, the movie begins with a voiceover saying the world of the past is the world of the spirit, which has been lost in the modern world. The voice speaking, which claims to be Millarca Karnstein, says she lived 500 years in the past and also lives now.

A group gathers at the Karnstein estate, where Count Leopoldo Karnstein announces that he’s going to throw a masked ball with a fireworks display for his fiancée Georgia. He introduces his first cousin, Carmilla, who was his childhood playmate. The fireworks display is to take place over the ruins of the family abbey, which upsets Carmilla. She relates the story of her ancestor, Millarca, who was in love with her cousin Ludwig but died before they could be married. Ludwig vowed fidelity but went on to get engaged to three other women, all who died right before their wedding day. The story frightens Georgia, as Carmilla suggests that Millarca may come back from the spirit world to claim him, as he resembles Ludwig. Leopoldo tells the group that centuries earlier, the Karnsteins were vampires, but they were all killed off.

On the night of the ball, Carmilla refuses to attend. Furious, Leopoldo goes up to her room and finds her drunk. He throws a dress at her and orders her to come down. She is drawn to Millarca’s white dress still hanging somewhere in the house. She puts it on and goes down to join the party. Everyone is shocked by her resemblance to the painting of Millarca in the main room.

During the fireworks display, explosions go off in the abbey. At the same time, Carmilla is led to Millarca’s tomb in the family crypt. As the coffin lid slides away, Carmilla seems to be overtaken by the spirit of Millarca. Early in the morning, Carmilla appears to emerge from the abbey and returns to the estate. Georgia and Leopoldo find her passed out in his bed. After they put her in her own bed, Carmilla awakens and Georgia tells her she feels cold as ice. Later, Leopoldo is told by local authorities that the explosions in the abbey were due to explosives leftover from WW2. He agrees that the abbey should be blown up so that no one gets hurt.

Over the next few days Carmilla begins to exhibit strange behaviour. She claims to be burned by the sun, and is constantly short of breath. Her horse becomes afraid of her and she can no longer ride him. Carmilla’s mood shifts between happy and depressed. At the same time, Giuseppe, who works on the grounds, sees a ghost and/or vampire roaming at night. One evening Carmilla follows Lisa, a servant, back to her cottage. Afterward, she returns to her room. Looking at her reflection in the mirror she sees blood covering the front of her white dress. She smashes the mirror in distress. Leopoldo enters the room and helps Carmilla into bed, where he begins kissing her. When she doesn’t respond, he asks her to forgive him. She tells him she can no longer love or forgive.

The next day, Lisa is found dead at the bottom of a cliff, with bite wounds on her neck. Leopoldo has to go into the village to sign a statement, along with Giuseppe, and the two young shepherd girls who found Lisa’s body. Giuseppe says that Lisa was killed by the vampire. Back at the estate, Georgia and Carmilla are trapped in the greenhouse due to a rainstorm. Georgia says she knows that Carmilla is in love with Leopoldo, and gives her a rose. Carmilla in turn confesses that she is Millarca, and Carmilla was killed the night of the ball. Georgia is confused and pricks her finger on a rose bush, sucking the blood from her finger. Millarca kisses her for a taste of the blood. Giuseppe interrupts them. Millarca drops the rose on the ground and the petals are shown to have withered, which is the mark of a vampire. Back at the house Georgia is shaken by the encounter but hides what happens from Leopoldo.

That evening, Leopoldo tells Georgia’s father, Judge Monteverdi, that he no longer wants to get married at the Karnstein estate but rather at the judge’s house in Venice. At dinner, the judge tells everyone that he has to return to work and they will have to leave the next day, but that Georgia and Leopoldo can get married in Venice. This announcement causes Millarca to smash her wine glass. Later, Millarca waits until Leopoldo falls asleep and sneaks into Georgia’s bedroom. Georgia has a nightmare about Millarca biting her on the neck. She screams. Leopoldo and Monteverdi run in and find her still asleep with bite marks on her neck, similar to those on Lisa’s body. Leopoldo sends for a doctor. In her sleep Georgia says she knows Millarca will die. The next morning, Georgia is better, but Millarca has disappeared.

The doctor who attends Georgia tells Leopoldo that the announcement of his marriage was too great of a shock for Carmilla, so she created a fantasy world in her mind, in which she became Millarca, and then attacked Georgia in order to take her place. Meanwhile, Millarca flees toward the abbey, where preparations are being made to blow it up. Leopoldo follows her, but before he can reach her the force of the explosion knocks her down, and she falls upon a sharp wooden spike, which pierces her through the heart. At the same time, in her bedroom, Georgia reacts as if in pain. Leopoldo finds Millarca dead.

Three months later, Leopoldo and Georgia are shown flying in a plane in their honeymoon. Georgia is snuggled up against Leopoldo‘s shoulder, holding a rose. In a voice over, Millarca says that Leopoldo still thinks that it was Georgia he married, but in reality it was her, Millarca, and that Leopoldo belongs to her. The last scene shows Georgia, who is actually Millarca, asleep on Leopoldo’s shoulder, and the rose withers away in her hand.

== Cast ==
- Mel Ferrer as Leopoldo De Karnstein
- Elsa Martinelli as Georgia Monteverdi
- Annette Vadim (Stroyberg) as Carmilla
- René-Jean Chauffard as Dr. Verari
- Marc Allégret as Judge Monteverdi
- Alberto Bonucci as Carlo Ruggieri
- Serge Marquand as Giuseppe
- Gabriella Farinon as Lisa
- Renato Speziali as Guido Naldi
- Edith Peters as The Cook
- Giovanni Di Benedetto as Police Marshal
- Carmilla Stroyberg as Martha
- Nathalie LeForet as Marie

== Production ==
Blood and Roses was filmed at Hadrian's Villa in Italy.

== Release ==
Blood and Roses was released in France on 14 September 1960. It was released in Rome in January 1961 under the title Il sangue e la rosa. It was also released in the United States in September 1961.

Thus far the only DVD of Blood and Roses is a 2014 German release featuring the original French-language version and a German-language dub with optional English subtitles.

== Reception ==
In a contemporary review Monthly Film Bulletin noted that "despite the elegance and beauty of the backgrounds in and about Hadrian's Villa" and "Claude Renoir's Tehnicolor-Technicrama photography, this expensive attempt at an art horror film is nothing short of a travesty-both of the genre and LeFanu's marvellous short story." The review noted that the film was "awkward and pedantic" and that the "vampire story is ruined by leaden dialogue, stridently dubbed, and by the sometimes bathetic acting" and that the "film suffers badly from comparison with Dreyer's much freer adaptation of the story, Vampyr."

The March 1962 issue of the pro-gay magazine ONE noted that "We hear the latest fad for some gay girls after seeing the spook vampire movie with a lesbian lilt, Blood & Roses, is to tattoo two little marks above the jugular. Wanta neck?"

== See also ==
- List of French films of 1960
- List of horror films of 1960
- Lesbian vampire
- Vampire film
