= Lolita (Italian singer) =

Italian singer (1950–1986)

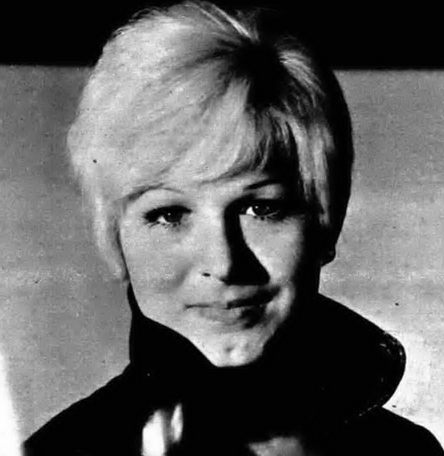
- Lolita in 1970

Background information
- Born: Graziella Franchini; 5 January 1950; Castagnaro, Verona, Kingdom of Italy
- Died: 27 April 1986 (aged 36) Lamezia Terme, Catanzaro, Italy
- Occupation: Singer

Graziella Franchini (5 January 1950 – 27 April 1986), better known as Lolita, was an Italian pop singer.

== Life and career ==
Born in Castagnaro, Lolita won several music festivals, including the Pesaro Music Festival and the Italian Song Festival of Zurich. She first became known in 1969, thanks to her participation to the Festival di Napoli, where she was finalist with two songs, and to the RAI musical show Settevoci, where she launched her hit "Come le rose".

In the following years Lolita took part in some of the most important musical events in Italy, including Un disco per l'estate and the 23rd edition of the Sanremo Music Festival.

With her career declining in the second half of the 1980s, she moved to Lamezia Terme, where she continued to perform in live events achieving some local success. The night of 27 April 1986 she had to attend a musical event but did not show up; she was found dead the following morning, murdered by stabbing, and with her body disfigured in several parts. The crime remains unsolved.

== See also ==
- List of unsolved murders (1980–1999)

== Discography ==
=== Singles ===
- 1966: Matusalemme/La prima barba (Magic, MC 004)
- 1967: La mia vita non ha domani/Notte giovane (Magic, MC 006)
- 1968: Come le rose/W l'estate (Escalation, En 001)
- 1969: L'ultimo ballo d'estate/Pensiero (CAR Juke Box, CRJ NP 1048)
- 1969: Tu/Songo 'e nato (CAR Juke Box, CRJ NP 1051)
- 1969: L'onda verde/Giovedì venerdì (CAR Juke Box, CRJ NP 1059)
- 1970: Circolo chiuso/Malinconia malinconia (Shoking, SKLR 10 001)
- 1970: Dicitencello vuje/Notte chiara (Philips, 6025 016)
- 1971: Io sto soffrendo/Il primo amore (Shoking, SKLR 10 002)
- 1973: Innamorata io?/Situazione (CAR Juke Box, CRJ NP 1087)
- 1984: Sei la felicità/Amico mio (Idea Records, LR 76001)
