= Edith Peters =

American singer (1926–2000)

- Also known as: Edith Catalano
- Born: Edith Arlene Peters; April 14, 1926; Santa Monica, California, US
- Died: October 28, 2000 (aged 74) Los Angeles, California
- Genres: Jazz, Blues
- Occupation: Singer

Edith Arlene Peters (April 14, 1926 – October 28, 2000) was an American singer and actress. She appeared in more than sixteen films from 1957 to 1981.

== Biography ==
Peters was the fourth of five sisters. Her sisters Virginia, Mattye and Anne were known as The Peters Sisters. She sang in a duo with her sister Joyce, also known as The Peters Sisters.

In 1958 she married her Italian agent Silvio Catalano, and moved to Italy where she appeared in movies, commercials and TV dramas.

== Filmography ==
Film
Year	Title	Role	Notes
1957	Quiéreme con música		
1960	Carthage in Flames	Serapta	
1960	Under Ten Flags	Suora	
1960	Blood and Roses	The Cook	
1960	Robin Hood and the Pirates	Palla di Grasso / Bambola	
1960	Madri pericolose	Princess Fatima	
1961	5 marines per 100 ragazze	Cucinera	
1961	Ein Stern fällt vom Himmel	Fräulein Pfeffer	
1961	The Last Judgment	Black Woman	
1962	The Turkish Cucumbers	Mahila, Haremsdame	
1962	The Fury of Achilles	Nubian Slave	
1962	Canzoni a tempo di twist		
1963	Obiettivo ragazze	La indigena	
1964	Two Mafiamen in the Far West		
1965	The Tramplers	Emma	
1966	Kiss the Girls and Make Them Die	Maria	
1970	Lisa dagli occhi blu	Cook	
1980	The Taming of the Scoundrel	Mamie	
1981	A Policewoman in New York	La cameriera	(final film role)
