= Un grande amore e niente più =

Single by Peppino di Capri
- B-side: "Per favore non gridare"
- Released: 1973
- Genre: Pop ballad
- Length: 3:24
- Label: Splash
- Songwriters: Franco Califano; Gianni Wright; Giuseppe Faiella

Peppino di Capri singles chronology
"Magari" (1972)	"Un grande amore e niente più" (1973)	"Scusa..." (1973)

Audio
- "Un grande amore e niente più" on YouTube

"Un grande amore e niente più" (lit. 'A great love and nothing more') is a 1973 song by Peppino di Capri. It won the 23th edition of the Sanremo Music Festival.

The song was co-written by di Capri with Franco Califano and Gianni Wright; Claudio Mattone collaborated to the composition of the music but was not credited. The lyrics have been described as a more adult version of Claudio Baglioni's signature song "Questo piccolo grande amore".

Artists who covered the song include Raymond Lefèvre, Nicola Di Bari, Franco Califano, Kati Kovács and Sal Da Vinci.

== Track listing ==
No.	Title	Writer(s)	Length
1.	"Un grande amore e niente più"	Franco Califano, Gianni Wright, Giuseppe Faiella	3:24
2.	"Per favore non gridare"	Franco Califano, Claudio Mattone	3:07

== Charts ==
Chart	Peak position
Italy (Musica e dischi)	1
