= Piero Focaccia =

Italian pop singer and film actor

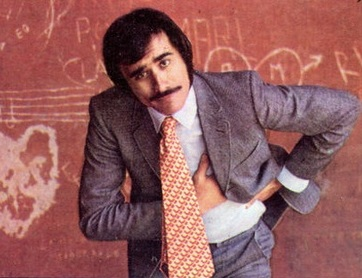

Background information
- Born: 16 October 1944 (age 81); Cervia, Ravenna
- Occupations: Singer, actor
- Years active: 1962–1970s

Piero Focaccia (born 16 October 1944) is an Italian pop singer and film actor.

== Career ==
Born in Cervia, near Ravenna, a former lifeguard, Focaccia began his career in 1962, with the single "Il pappagallo". He got his main success one year later with the song "Stessa spiaggia, stesso mare" which won the Disco per l'estate competition and reached the third place at the Italian hit parade. After a less successful period, in 1970 his song "Permette signora" peaked number nine at the hit parade.

Focaccia entered the Sanremo Music Festival competition three times between 1964 and 1974.

He was also actor in two comedy films, Mariano Laurenti's Naughty Nun and Luigi Comencini's Le bambole.
