= Champagne (Peppino di Capri song) =

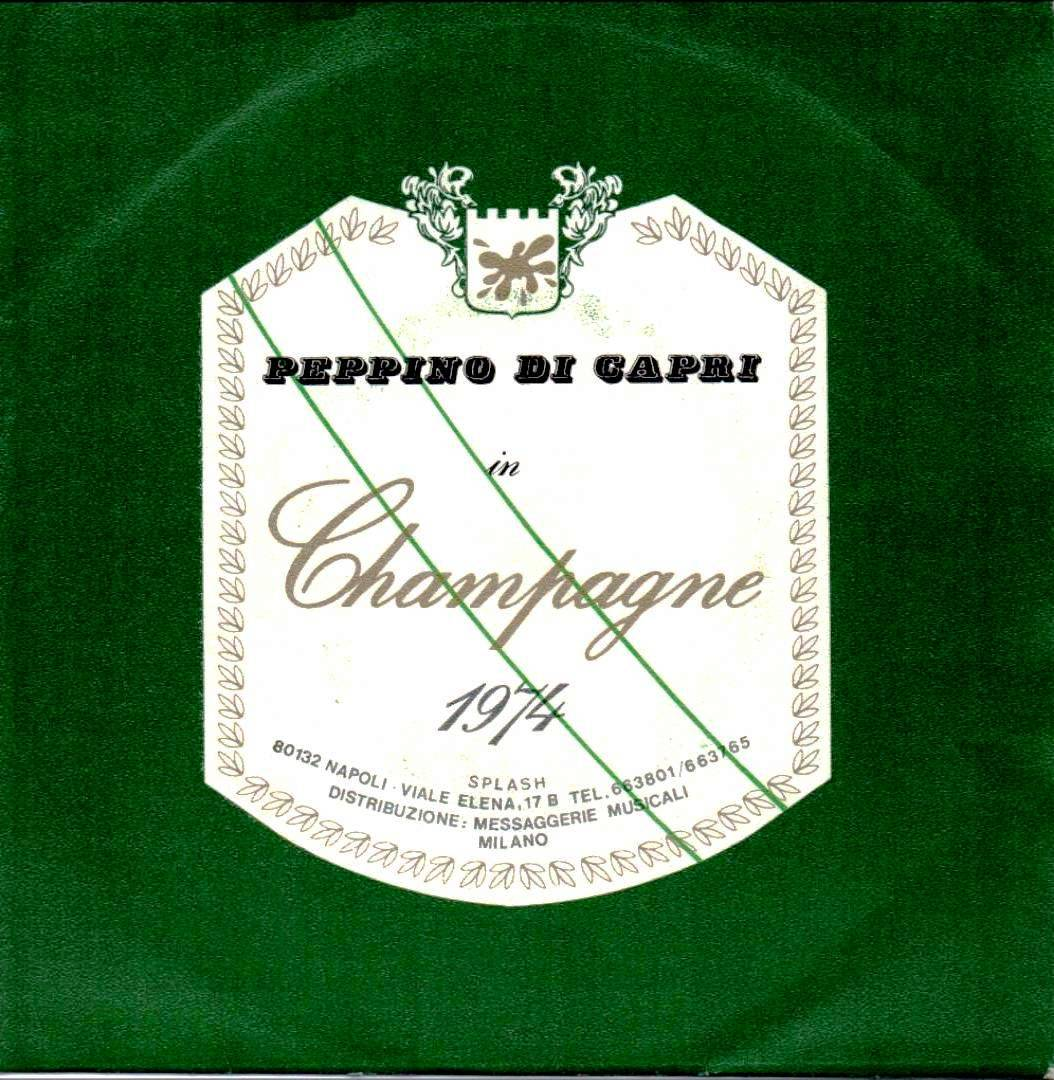

Single by Peppino di Capri

from the album Champagne
- B-side: "La prima sigaretta"
- Released: 1973
- Length: 3:48
- Label: Splash
- Songwriters: Mimmo Di Francia; Depsa; Sergio Iodice

Peppino di Capri singles chronology
"Scusa" (1973)	"Champagne" (1973)	"Amore grande, amore mio" (1974)

Audio
- "Champagne" on YouTube

"Champagne" is a 1973 Italian song composed by Mimmo Di Francia, Depsa and Sergio Iodice and performed by Peppino di Capri.

The song was composed by Di Francia during a taxi trip in Naples. Di Francia's friend di Capri initially recorded a demo with the sole purpose of getting Charles Aznavour and Domenico Modugno to listen to it and possibly record it, but he eventually fell in love with it and asked the composers to be the one to launch the song.

Di Capri presented the song at Canzonissima in December 1973. The song initially achieved only tepid success, placing behind Gigliola Cinquetti, Mino Reitano, Vianella and Orietta Berti in the competition ranking and failing to enter the top ten in the hit parade, but gradually became a classic, in particular making its way into the typical repertoire of nightclubs and piano bars.

Artists who covered the song include Andrea Bocelli, Roberto Carlos, Manolo Otero, José Luis Rodríguez, Mino Reitano, Nico Fidenco, Agnaldo Timóteo, Fausto Papetti. In 2015, Di Capri recorded "Fiumi di Champagne", a rap version of the song in a duet with Gue Pequeno, which was used as theme song of the film Natale col Boss. The song was also included in the soundtrack of Dino Risi's films Scent of a Woman and Il commissario Lo Gatto.

== Track listing ==
No.	Title	Writer(s)	Length
1.	"Champagne"	Mimmo Di Francia, Depsa, Sergio Iodice	3:48
2.	"La prima sigaretta"	Di Francia, Sharade	3:57

== Charts ==
Chart performance for "Champagne "
Chart (1974)	Peak position
Italy (Musica e dischi)	16
