= Piero Cotto =

Italian musician and singer (born 1944)

- Also known as: Peter Cook
- Born: 14 July 1944 (age 81); Asti, Italy
- Occupation: Singer-songwriter

Piero Cotto (born 14 July 1944) is an Italian singer-songwriter and musician.

== Life and career ==
Born in Asti, Cotto began his musical career as a member of the Henghel Gualdi Orchestra. In 1964, he took part in Un disco per l'estate, and in 1966 he charted in Greece with the song "Forgiveness".

After serving as a guitarist for the band Majority One, under the stage name "Peter Cook", in the early 1970s, Cotto formed the band Piero e i Cottonfields, with which he achieved a major hit with the single "Due delfini bianchi", which sold over 500,000 copies. In 1972, the group recorded their first and only album, Il Viaggio, La Donna, Un'altra Vita. In 1975, shortly after the disbandment of the band, he entered the main competition at the 25th edition of the Sanremo Music Festival, reaching the finals with the song "Il telegramma".

In the second half of the 1970s, Cotto collaborated on various projects with Augusto Martelli. In 1980, he ranked second at the Viña del Mar International Song Festival with "Ninna nanna a un posto vuoto", and in 1990 he won the festival with "Non devi abbandonarmi mai". In the 1980s he toured with Astor Piazzolla and collaborated with Francesco Salvi, appearing in his Italia 1 show MegaSalviShow and composing "Le solite promesse", the B-side of his number 1 single "C'è da spostare una macchina".

In 1992, Cotto married Beatrice Pasquali, who served as backing vocalist for him under the stage name Beatrice Dalì since 1981. In 2022, the couple took part in The Voice Senior, reaching the finals. Cotto has two sons, Matteo and Samuele.
