= Domodossola (band) =

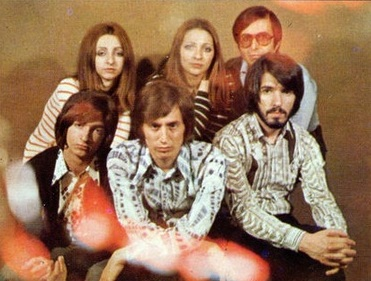

Background information
- Origin: Domodossola, Italy
- Genres: Pop
- Years active: 1969–1977
- Labels: PDU; Yep

Domodossola, also spelled as I Domodossola, was an Italian pop band, active between 1969 and 1977.

== Career ==
The group consisted of the siblings Laura (born 1948), Maura (b. 1950) and Urbano Miserocchi (b. 1952), their cousin Riccardo Miserocchi (b. 1949), their uncle Franco Bertagnini (b. 1941), Renzo Reami (b. 1945) and Pierluigi Saccani (b. 1948). They were initially produced by Mina, and debuted in 1969 with the single "Amori miei", a cover version of "Oh Happy Day" which premiered at the Mostra internazionale di musica leggera.

During their career Domodossola took part in the 1971 edition of Un disco per l'estate, and in 1970 and in 1974 they entered the main competition at the Sanremo Music Festival with the songs "Ciao anni verdi" and "Se hai paura". Their last hit was the 1977 song "Dolce così", which ranked #36 on the Italian hit parade; the group disbanded shortly later.

== Discography ==
Album

- 1971: D... come Domodossola (PDU, PLD A 5036)
- 1972: L'allegria (PDU, PLD A 5063)
- 1974: Se hai paura (PDU, PLD A 5086)
