= Umberto Balsamo =

Italian singer-songwriter and composer

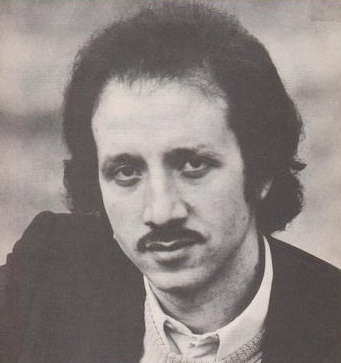
- Balsamo in 1974

Background information
- Born: 10 May 1942 (age 84); Catania, Sicily, Kingdom of Italy
- Origin: Milan, Lombardy, Italy
- Occupation: Singer-songwriter
- Years active: 1964–present

Rosario Umberto Balsamo (born 10 March 1942) is an Italian singer-songwriter and composer, best known for the songs "L'angelo azzurro" and "Balla".

== Background ==
Born in Catania, Balsamo was the youngest of five brothers. In 1964 he moved to Milan, where he started working together with the lyricist Luciano Beretta, composing songs for, among others, Iva Zanicchi and Orietta Berti. In 1968 he made his debut as a singer with the song " Il mio cuore riposa", released under the pseudonym Bob Nero. Balsamo obtained his first success in 1972 with the song "Se fossi diversa", which ranked nineteen in the Italian hit parade. The following year he entered the competition at the Sanremo Music Festival with the song "Amore mio". In 1977 he topped the hit parade with the song "L'angelo azzurro", selling over a million of copies In 1979 he had one another major success with the song "Balla", a mixture of tarantella and disco music. In the eighties Balsamo focused on composing, achieving a significant success with the song "Italia", sung by Mino Reitano at the Sanremo Music Festival 1988.

== Discography ==
=== Singles ===
Year	Title	IT
1971	Piangerei	-
1972	Se fossi diversa	19
1973	Amore mio	28
1974	Bugiardi noi	3
1974	O prima o adesso o poi	23
1975	Natali	34
1976	Se	16
1977	L'angelo azzurro	1
1978	Crepuscolo	-
1979	Balla	4
1980	Il giorno	-
1982	Mai più	-
1984	Io vivrò	-
1985	Favole	-

=== Studio albums ===
- 1974 Passato presente e futuro
- 1975 Natalì
- 1977 Malgrado tutto...l'angelo azzurro
- 1978 Crepuscolo d'amore
- 1979 Balla
- 1979 Auto Music
- 1980 Pianeti
- 1982 Mai più
- 1990 Respirando la notte luna
- 1992 Un pugno nella notte
- 2003 Vorrei aprire il cielo sabato sera a spina di rosa

=== Compilation albums ===
- 1989 L'angelo azzurro e altri successi
- 1995 Umberto Balsamo - Le sue più belle canzoni
