= Gigi Vesigna =

Italian journalist and writer

- Born: 8 February 1932; Milan, Italy
- Died: 28 February 2015 (aged 83); Rome, Italy
- Occupations: Journalist, writer

Gigi Vesigna (8 February 1932 – 28 February 2015) was an Italian journalist and writer.

Born in Milan, the son of a businessman from La Spezia and a schoolteacher from Apulia, at high school Vesigna started writing his first articles for the school newspaper. He began his career in the 1950s as a collaborator of the magazine Settimana TV. In 1961 he became a Mondadori employer and began working on the weekly magazine Teletutto. In 1973 he became the director of the magazine TV Sorrisi e Canzoni, bringing the print run from 600,000 copies a week up to 3.3 million copies.

Vesigna founded the Telegatto award and the musical event Vota la Voce. In 1985 he founded the cinema monthly magazine Ciak, and in 1995 the short-lived newspaper Il Telegiornale.

Vesigna was one of the major experts of the Sanremo Music Festival, about which he wrote several books.
