= Nico dei Gabbiani =

Italian singer (1944–2012)

Nicola Tirone (18 September 1944 – 12 April 2012), best known as Nico dei Gabbiani, was an Italian singer.

Born in Sambuca di Sicilia, he was founder and voice of the pop-beat group Nico e i Gabbiani, with whom achieved several hits in the late sixties. In the early 1970s, he became soloist, obtaining his major success with the song Cento Campane, theme of the TV series Il segno del comando.

During the eighties Nico toured the US, notably NY with the Group Europa based in Westchester. He was greeted with great enthusiasm singing his hits such as Dedica, Amore Senza Fine, and Parole.
