= Gilda (Italian singer) =

Italian singer

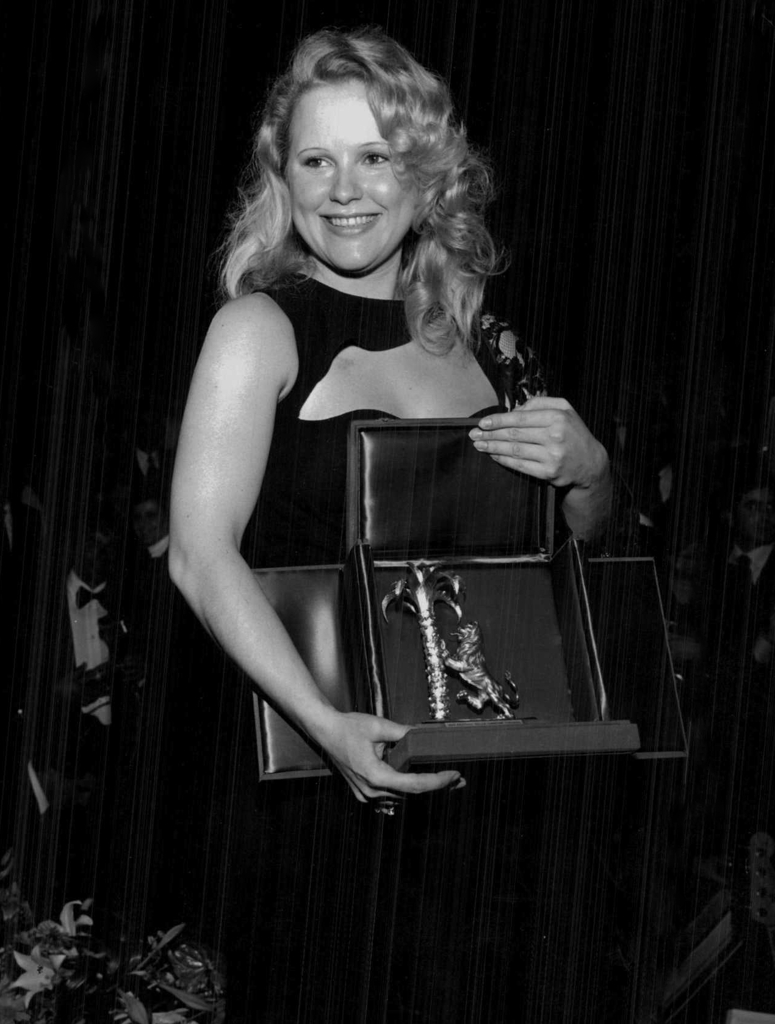
- Gilda upon winning the Sanremo Music Festival 1975

Background information
- Born: Rosangela Scalabrino; 31 May 1950 (age 75); Masserano, Italy
- Genres: Pop
- Occupation: Singer-songwriter
- Years active: 1969–1980s
- Labels: Radio Records; Sun; City; Sides

Rosangela Scalabrino (born 31 May 1950), known professionally as Gilda, is an Italian singer-songwriter. She won the Sanremo Music Festival 1975 with the song "Ragazza del sud".

== Life and career ==
A native of Masserano, Piedmont, Gilda started her career as the vocalist in a local band. After failing to qualify for a previous edition, she debuted at the 25th edition of the Sanremo Music Festival and won the competition with a song composed by herself, "Ragazza del sud", which was heavily criticized for its anti-feminist lyrics and its negative portrayal of Southern Italy.

After a few further singles, Gilda got married and started managing a hotel in Turin, abandoning the show business industry except for a few occasional live performances.

Preceded by Iva Zanicchi	Winner of the Sanremo Music Festival; 1975	Succeeded by Peppino di Capri
