= Toni Santagata =

Italian singer-songwriter (1935–2021)

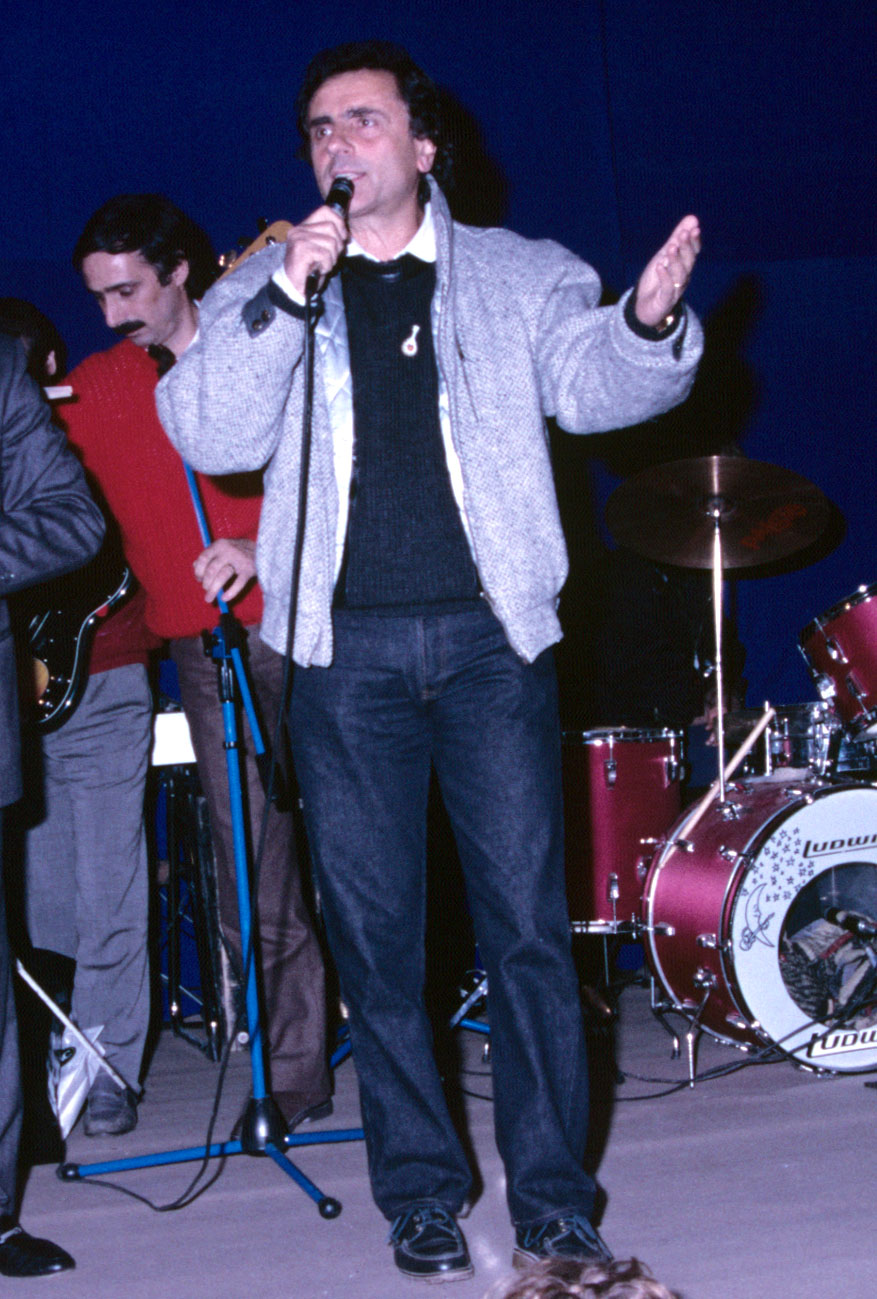
- Santagata in 1983
- Born: Antonio Morese; 9 December 1935; Sant'Agata di Puglia, Foggia, Kingdom of Italy
- Died: 5 December 2021 (aged 85); Rome, Italy
- Occupations: Singer, comedian, actor

Antonio Morese (9 December 1935 – 5 December 2021), known professionally as Toni Santagata, was an Italian folk singer, composer, comedian, and actor. He was sometimes credited as Tony Santagata.

== Life and career ==
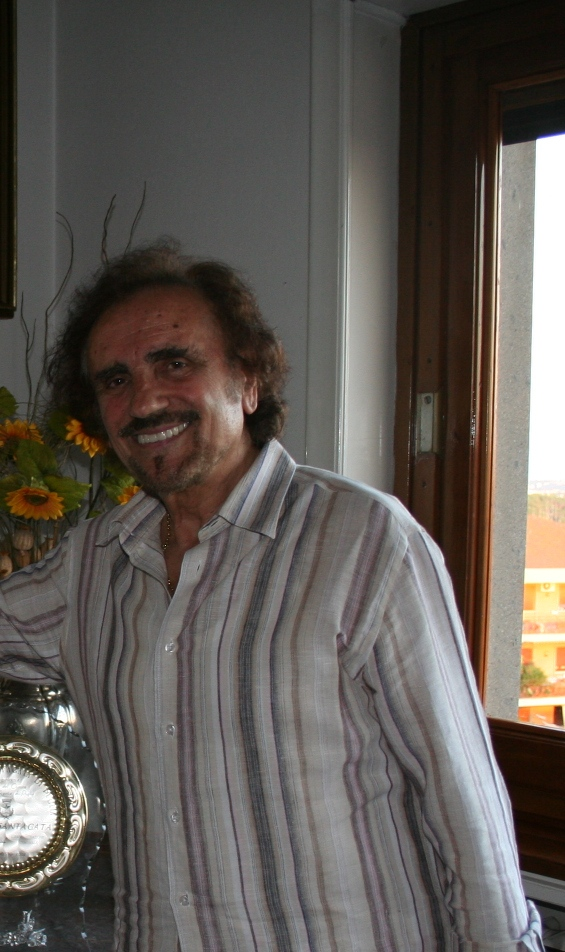
Santagata in 2009

Born in Sant'Agata di Puglia, Foggia, Santagata made his debut as a comedian at the Derby Club in Milan, with the show Toni Santagata e il suo cabaret, later also released as an album. In the following years he embraced folk music, both recording some classics of the Apulian tradition and composing songs. In 1973 Santagata won the folk section of Canzonissima with "Lu maritiello"; the song was also his major hit, peaking at number six place on the Italian hit parade.

Santagata died on 5 December 2021, at the age of 85.

== Discography ==
Album

- 1968 - La vita di Padre Pio
- 1969 - Ciccillo Provolone
- 1970 - Toni Santagata, le sue canzoni, il suo cabaret
- 1975 - Lu maritiello ed altre canzoni
- 1975 - Vino Vino
- 1976 - Festa grande
- 1977 - Lu maritiello ed altri successi
- 1982 - Squadra Grande
- 1982 - Quant'è bello lu primm'ammore
- 1983 - Unicus
- 1984 - Ti mando un fax
- 1994 - Storie italiane
- 2002 - Padre Pio
- 2006 - Idee da cantare
- 2010 - Quant'è bello lu primm'ammore e altri successi
