= Provincial radio (TRT) =

Turkish radio stations in the 1960s–1970s

Provincial radios (Turkish: İl radyosu) were a group of low-power radio stations founded in the 1960s and 1970s in Turkey.

Up to 1990, broadcasting was monopolized by the Turkish Radio and Television Corporation (TRT). The main radio stations were in Ankara and İstanbul. There were no repeaters and the transmitters were insufficient for good reception in the remote areas of Anatolia. Thus, in the 1960s, it was planned to establish low power medium wave radio stations in 9 provinces. These stations were called Provincial radios. They were in İstanbul, İzmir, Ankara, Adana, Gaziantep, Diyarbakır, Van, Kars and later Trabzon.

Unlike the main radio stations in Ankara, the program content (except for the nationwide news) was local. The 2 kW power medium wave transmitters were in the cities and were manufactured by a Turkey based company T.E.M.

However in 1970s the broadcasting policy of TRT was revised and low power stations were replaced by high power stations which were called regional radios (Turkish: Bölge Radyosu).
