= Peppino di Capri =

Italian singer (1939–2026)

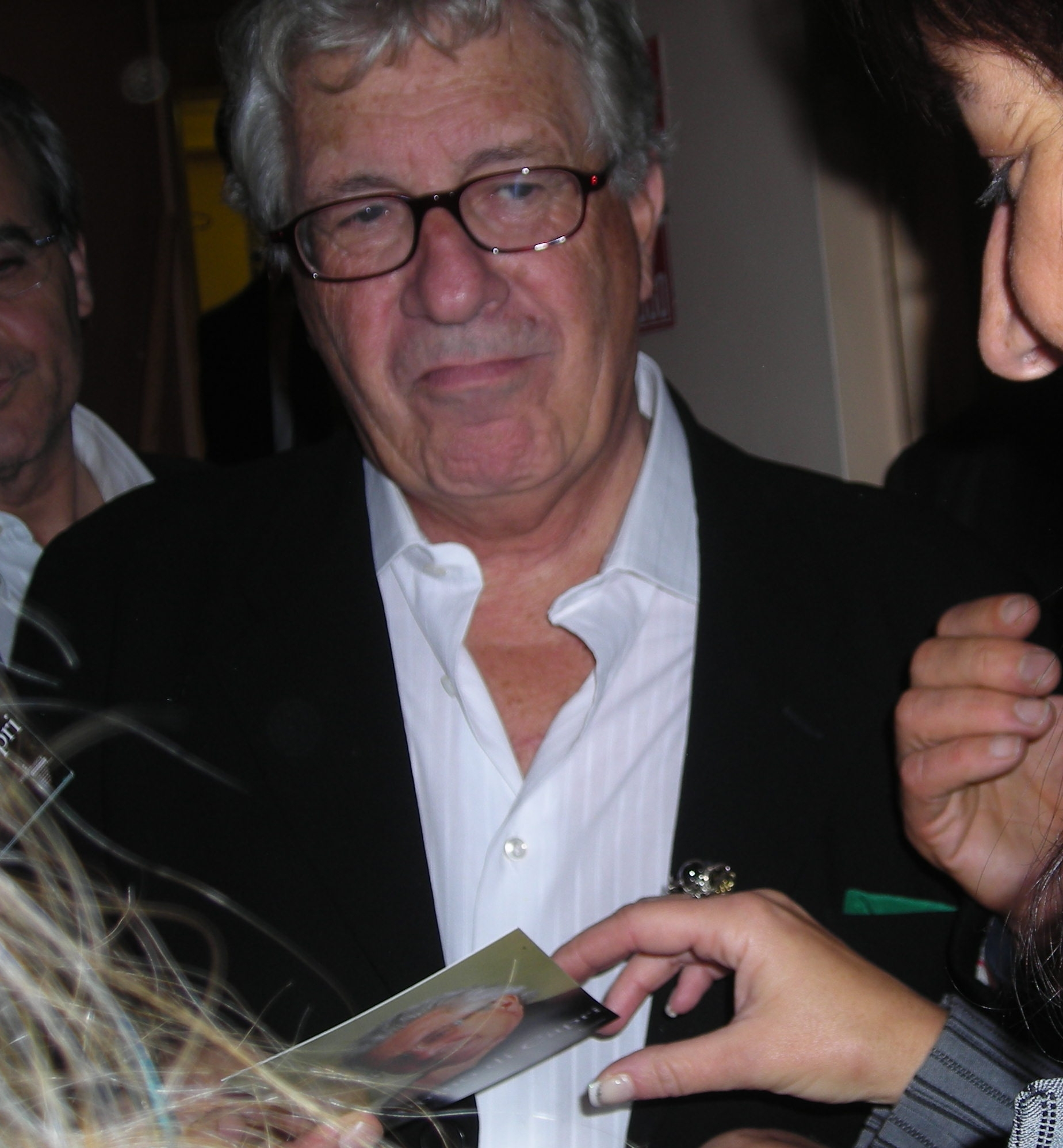
- di Capri in 2008

Background information
- Born: Giuseppe Faiella; 27 July 1939; Capri, Italy
- Died: 11 July 2026 (aged 86) Capri, Italy
- Genres: Neapolitan songs; pop; Italian popular music
- Occupations: Singer; songwriter; pianist
- Instruments: Vocals; piano
- Years active: 1958–2026
- Labels: Carisch; Splash; Baby; Ricordi; Polygram; Lucky Planets; Odeon
- Website: peppinodicapri.net

Giuseppe Faiella (27 July 1939 – 11 July 2026), professionally known as Peppino di Capri ("Joe from Capri"), was an Italian popular music singer, songwriter, and pianist, successful in Italy and Europe. His international hits include "St. Tropez Twist", "Daniela", "Torna piccina", "Roberta", "Melancolie", "Freva", "L'ultimo romantico", "Un grande amore e niente più", "Non lo faccio più", "Nun è peccato", and "Champagne".

== Life and career ==
Peppino di Capri began singing and playing the piano at age 4, entertaining the American army troops stationed on the island of Capri with a repertoire of American standards. After 6 years of classical studies and playing at nightclubs around Capri, Peppino and his group The Rockers released their first singles, "Malattia" ("Sickness") and "Nun è Peccato" ("It's not a sin"), sung in Neapolitan in 1958.

The latter was an instant hit, and Peppino spent most of the following year touring. A string of hit singles soon followed, usually alternating between Italian versions of American rock'n'roll and twist songs (with some verses sung in English), and originals in Italian and Napoletano, and di Capri became one of the top acts in the country. His 1960s hits include his cover versions of Chubby Checker's "Let's Twist Again" and Ben E. King's "Don't Play That Song", modern versions of Canzone Napoletana classics such as "Voce 'e notte", "Luna caprese", and "I' te vurria vasà", and original compositions, notably "Nessuno al mondo" and "Roberta", which was named after his then wife.

After performing as the opening act for The Beatles on their 1965 tour of Italy, di Capri and his group attempted, with moderate success, to break out of the European market. Their work was well received, particularly in Brazil, thanks to the large Italian immigrant community in that country.

In 1970, di Capri won the Festival di Napoli with "Me chiamme ammore". In 1971, he took part in the prestigious Sanremo Music Festival with "L'ultimo romantico". Two years later, he won the festival with the song "Un grande amore e niente più" ("A great love and nothing more") and released his signature song "Champagne".

He won the Sanremo Festival again in 1976, with the song "Non lo faccio più" ("I won't do it anymore"). He took part in the festival several times in the following decades, notably launching the hits "E mo' e mo'" (1985) and "Il sognatore" (1987). He represented Italy in the Eurovision Song Contest 1991, coming in 7th place with 89 points with the song "Comme è ddoce 'o mare" ("How sweet is the sea"), sung in Neapolitan.

As of 2006, di Capri is the performer with the most appearances (15) at the Sanremo Festival, his last appearance being in 2005, singing "La Panchina" ("The little park bench").

Di Capri died on 11 July 2026, at the age of 86.

== Sanremo Festival ==
As of 2023, Di Capri participated 15 times in the Sanremo Music Festival, tying for most participations with Al Bano, Anna Oxa, Milva, and Toto Cutugno. He won the competition twice.

- 1967 – "Dedicato all'amore"
- 1971 – "L'ultimo romantico"
- 1973 – "Un grande amore e niente più" (winner)
- 1976 – "Non lo faccio più" (winner)
- 1980 – "Tu cioè..."
- 1985 – "E mo' e mo'"
- 1987 – "Il sognatore"
- 1988 – "Nun chiagnere"
- 1989 – "Il mio pianoforte"
- 1990 – "Evviva Maria"
- 1992 – "Favola blues"
- 1993 – "La voce delle stelle"
- 1995 – "Ma che ne sai (Se non hai fatto il pianobar)"
- 2001 – "Pioverà (Habibi ené)"
- 2005 – "La panchina"

== Literary references ==
In his writings, Orhan Pamuk brings up Di Capri's songs. His nove0l Snow, taking place at the Turkish provincial town of Kars, includes the following passage:

"Through the open door of a shop which sold women's stockings, bolts of cotton, coloured pencils, batteries and cassettes, he heard once again the strains of Peppino di Capri's "Roberta". He recalled hearing it on the radio when he was a child and his uncle had taken him out for a drive to the Bosphorus" (Snow, Ch. 12).

In The Museum of Innocence, he writes:

"Later on I wrapped my arms around the ever patient and compassionate Sibel, swaying with her as Pepino di Capri sang “Melancholy.”" (The Museum of Innocence, Ch. 29)

Preceded by Nicola Di Bari with "I giorni dell'arcobaleno"	Sanremo Music Festival; Winner; 1973	Succeeded by Iva Zanicchi with "Ciao cara, come stai?"
Preceded by Gilda with "Ragazza del sud"	Sanremo Music Festival; Winner; 1976	Succeeded by Homo Sapiens with "Bella da morire"
Preceded by Toto Cutugno with Insieme: 1992	Italy in the Eurovision Song Contest; 1991	Succeeded by Mia Martini with Rapsodia
