= Gabriella Farinon =

Italian announcer, television presenter, film and stage actress

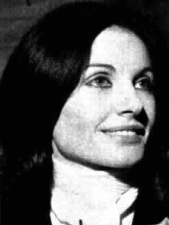
- Farinon in Radiocorriere magazine, 1975
- Born: 17 August 1941 (age 84); Oderzo, Kingdom of Italy
- Occupation: Actress

Gabriella Farinon (born 17 August 1941) is an Italian television and radio presenter and actress.

== Life and career ==
Born in Oderzo, after appearing in several films, in 1961 Farinon joined RAI as announcer. Starting from 1968, she presented several programs of various genres, notably several editions of the Sanremo Music Festival and of Un disco per l'estate. The last program she presented was the 1997 Rai 3 talk show TeleSogni.

Farinon's daughter Barbara Modesti, whom she had with documentarist Dore Modesti, is a RAI journalist. Her sister Luisa married businessman Francesco Gaetano Caltagirone.

== Selected filmography ==
- La cento chilometri (1959)
- Blood and Roses (1960)
- Assignment: Outer Space (1960)
- Anonima cocottes (1960)
- Le ambiziose (1960)
- Sword in the Shadows (1961)
- Alexander Zwo (1972, TV miniseries)
- Più forte sorelle (1973)
- Borsalino & Co. (1974)
- C'è una spia nel mio letto (1976)
- Goodnight, Ladies and Gentlemen (1976)
