= Liscio =

Italian genre of music

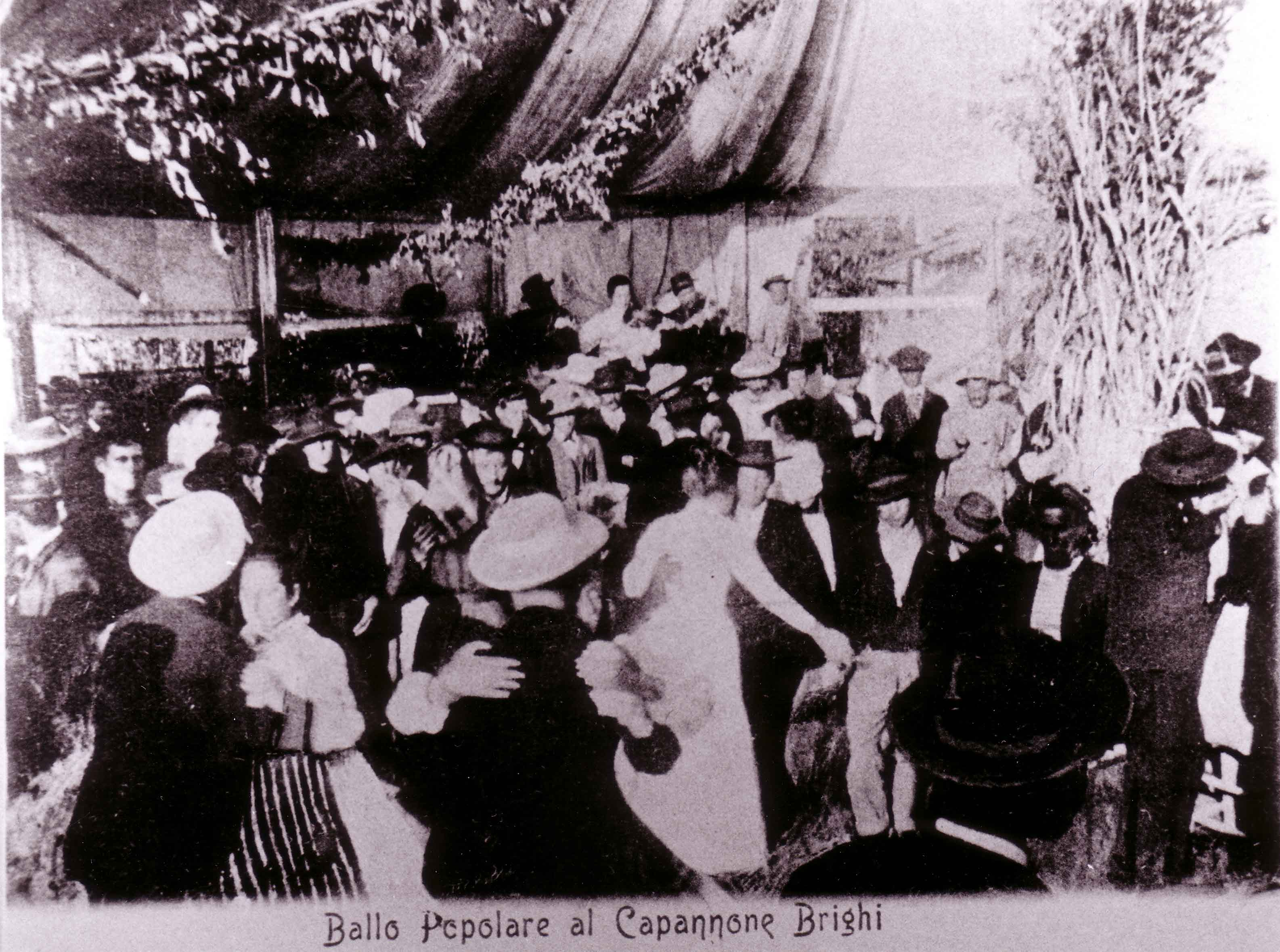

Liscio or ballo liscio ("smooth" or "smooth dance" respectively in Italian) is a genre of music originating in the 19th century in the northern Italian region of Romagna under the influence of Viennese ballroom dances including the mazurka, waltz, polka, schottische, march. It later became popular and spread to the rest of the country. The accordion, which was also a 19th-century invention, features prominently. The tradition contrasts with older Italian folk dances in which the fiddle was the primary instrument.

== Ballo liscio in Romagna ==
In Romagna, the phenomenon of the public and popular dance called "liscio" has created a unique universe and it has revolutionised the approaches to social, community and festive contexts, because it managed to blend different social strata and to allow a broad and inclusive identification process for higher but also more humble social classes.

Nowadays, this universe is home to many different protagonists: it gives employment to a huge number of musicians, singers, dancers, dance halls, record companies and media (TV, radio, local magazines). They form part of a rich cultural industry, held together by a powerful territorial and traditional binding force which is typical of Romagna's folklore.

In its essence, "liscio" is a combination of music and dance: its style is easily recognisable because it is rousing, with a cadenced rhythmic style and full of technical virtuosities. Nowadays, even if liscio performances have decreased in favour of more contaminated and mixed songs, many music bands maintain this genre in their musical repertoire.

This tradition of Romagna, besides being a varied enterprise, is a fundamental tool for the valorisation of the immaterial cultural heritage of the territory.

== Ballo liscio in California ==
Italian immigrants to San Francisco, California brought the liscio tradition to California in the early 1900s. Central to the California tradition are mandolin, accordion, and guitar, sometimes supplemented by violin and double bass. The ballroom music of Italian immigrants underwent a strong Latin American influence by the 1950s. The repertoire of California ballo liscio musicians is diverse, including uniquely Italian dances like the tarantella; pan-European round dance forms; the American foxtrot; the Spanish jota and paso doble; the Latin American rhumba; and the Caribbean beguine.

Several bands continue to play ballo liscio repertoire in California, including the bands Zighi Baci & Mazurka Madness which both play regularly at Caffe Trieste in North Beach, Caffe Acustico, Paul & Emily, the Hot Frittatas, the Graventsein Mandolin Ensemble, and Gus Garelick.

== See also ==
- Italian folk music
- Music of California
- American folk music
- Gammaldans
