= L'angelo azzurro =

Single by Umberto Balsamo

from the album Malgrado tutto... l'angelo azzurro
- B-side: "Malgrado tutto"
- Released: 1977
- Genre: Pop
- Label: Polydor
- Songwriter(s): Umberto Balsamo, Cristiano Malgioglio

Umberto Balsamo singles chronology
"Se" (1976)	"L'angelo azzurro" (1977)	"Crepuscolo" (1978)

"L'angelo azzurro" is a 1977 song composed by Umberto Balsamo (music) and Cristiano Malgioglio (lyrics) and performed by Umberto Balsamo. This is Balsamo's biggest hit, topping the Italian hit parade, selling over a million copies.

The song has been described as "a sweet and smooth melody consisting of descendant sequences, almost magical in its evocative strength".

== Track listing ==
7" single – Polydor 060 141

1. "L'angelo azzurro" (Umberto Balsamo, Cristiano Malgioglio)
2. "Malgrado tutto" (Umberto Balsamo, Cristiano Malgioglio)

== Charts ==
Chart	Peak position
Italy	1
