= TV Sorrisi e Canzoni =

Italian listings magazine

- Editor: Aldo Vitali
- Categories: Television magazine Listings magazine
- Frequency: Weekly
- Founded: 1952; 74 years ago
- Company: Arnoldo Mondadori Editore
- Country: Italy
- Based in: Segrate
- Language: Italian
- Website: Official site

TV Sorrisi e Canzoni (lit. 'TV, Smiles, and Songs') is an Italian weekly listings magazine published in Segrate, Italy.

== History and profile ==
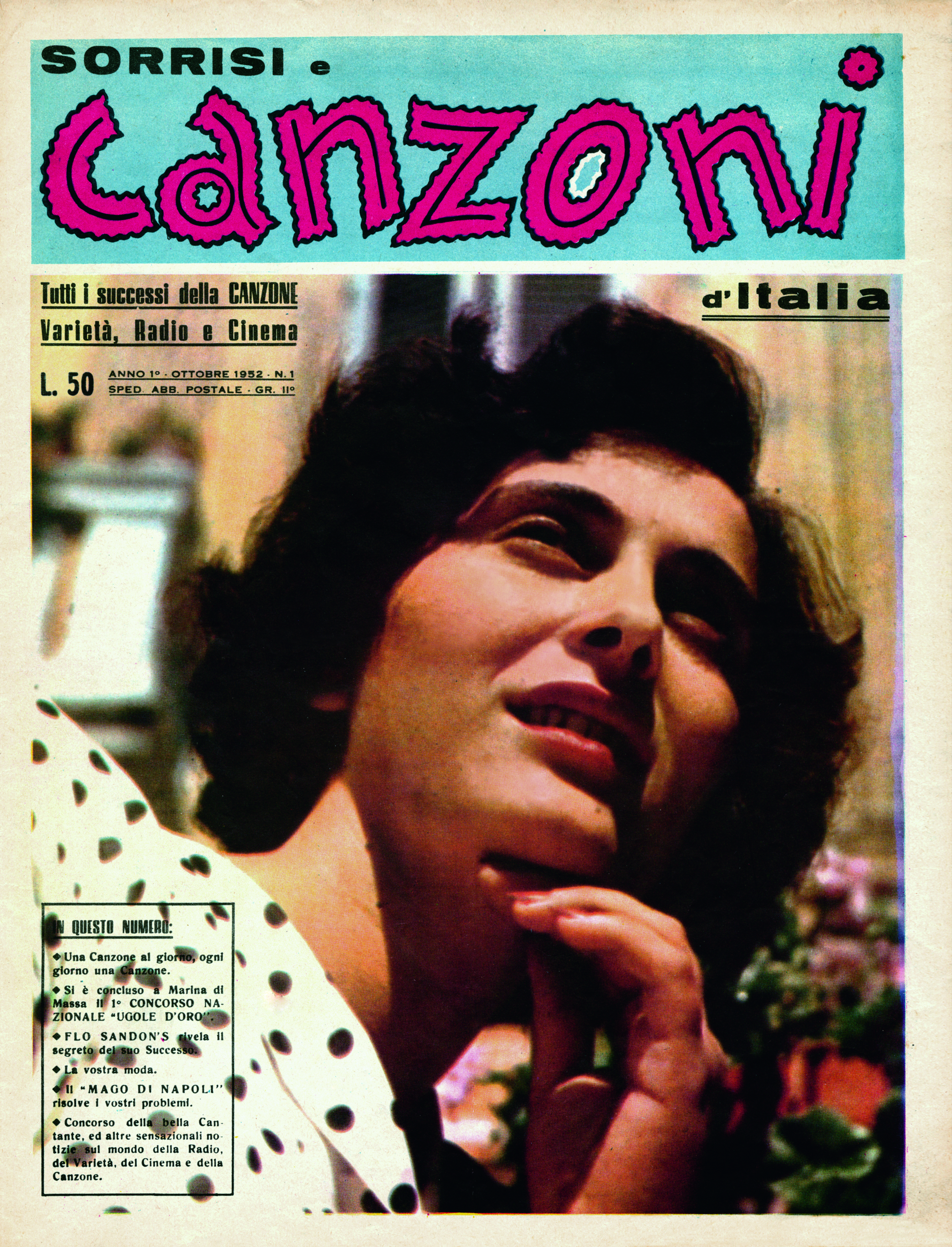
Cover of the first issue of Sorrisi e Canzoni d'Italia (Smiles and Songs of Italy), October 1952. The girl is Clara Jaione, Italian singer.

The magazine was established in 1952 in Foligno by Casa Editrice Campi, with the name Sorrisi e Canzoni d'Italia and Agostino Campi as editor-in-chief. After three issues with irregular releases, in June 1953 it adopted the name Sorrisi e Canzoni and became weekly. Starting from 1955, it began publishing in exclusive the lyrics of the Sanremo Music Festival the week before the competition.

In 1960, under the new editor-in-chief Tarquinio Maiorino, it adopted its current name TV Sorrisi e Canzoni. In 1967, it started providing a music chart of national best selling recordings, known as "Superclassifica". In 1971, it established the Telegatto award. Initially covering only radio and television programs and music, under the direction of Gigi Vesigna the magazine broadened its contents, covering other entertainment fields as well as current affairs and lifestyle news. In the mid-1970s the magazine was acquired by Rizzoli, that moved the moved the editorial office to Segrate, Milan. In 1982 it was purchased by Silvio Berlusconi, who sold it to Mondadori in 1997.

=== Circulation ===
TV Sorrisi e Canzoni had a circulation of 1,836,355 copies in 1984. The circulation of magazine rose to 1,997,809 copies from September 1993 to August 1994. Founded in 1952 by Agostino Campi for Editoriale Campi, it was one of top 50 best-selling television magazines worldwide with a circulation of 1,622,000 copies in 2001. Its circulation was 1,381,000 copies in 2004, making it the best-selling magazine in Italy. It was the best-selling television magazine in Italy in 2007 with a circulation of 1,086,414 copies. The magazine had a circulation of 883,220 copies in 2010.

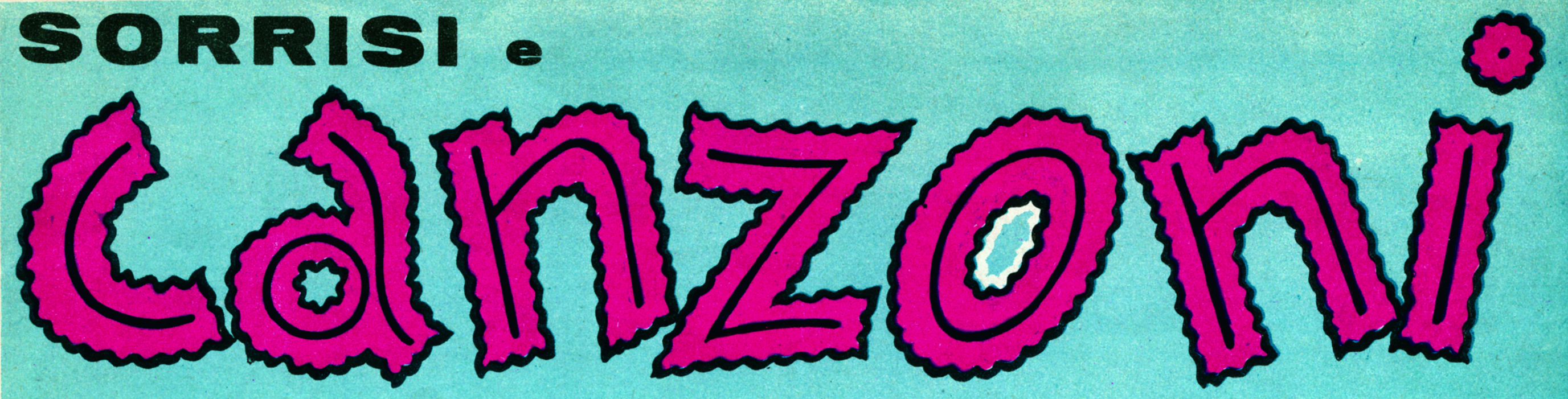
TV Sorrisi e Canzoni old logo, Mondadori October 1952

== See also ==
- List of magazines in Italy
- Telegatto
