= Gaetano Azzolina =

Italian politician (1931–2023)

Member of the Chamber of Deputies of Italy
- In office 25 January 1990 – 22 April 1992

Personal details
- Born: 29 May 1931 Riesi, Italy
- Died: 21 January 2023 (aged 91) Sarzana, Italy
- Party: PR
- Education: University of Palermo
- Occupation: Doctor

Gaetano Azzolina (29 May 1931 – 21 January 2023) was an Italian doctor and politician. A member of the Radical Party, he served in the Chamber of Deputies from 1990 to 1992.

Azzolina died in Sarzana on 21 January 2023, at the age of 91.
