= Sanremo Music Festival 1967 =

Italian song contest (17th edition)

Dates and venue
- First night: 26 January 1967
- Second night: 27 January 1967
- Final night: 28 January 1967
- Venue: Sanremo Casino; Sanremo, Italy

Organisation
- Organiser: Società ATA

Production
- Broadcaster: Radiotelevisione italiana (RAI)
- Director: Lino Procacci
- Artistic director: Gianni Ravera
- Presenters: Mike Bongiorno and Renata Mauro

Vote
- Number of entries: 30
- Winner: "Non pensare a me" Iva Zanicchi and Claudio Villa

The Sanremo Music Festival 1967 (Italian: Festival di Sanremo 1967), officially the 17th Italian Song Festival (17º Festival della canzone italiana), was the 17th annual Sanremo Music Festival, held at the Sanremo Casino in Sanremo between 26 and 28 January 1967. It was organised by Società ATA, concessionary of the Sanremo Casino and was broadcast by Radiotelevisione italiana (RAI). The shows were presented by Mike Bongiorno and Renata Mauro. Gianni Ravera served as artistic director.

Each song was performed twice, by both Italian and foreign artists. The winning song was "Non pensare a me" written by Alberto Testa and Eros Sciorilli, and performed by both Iva Zanicchi and Claudio Villa. Initially the song was meant to represent Italy at the Eurovision Song Contest 1967 with Villa as the selected performer, but due to a new rule introduced by the European Broadcasting Union (EBU) requiring competing songs to not be commercially released a month before the contest, it was disqualified. Villa instead went on to compete in the contest with "Non andare più lontano".

The edition was characterised by the death of singer-songwriter Luigi Tenco while the festival was taking place, less than a day after his song "Ciao amore, ciao" failed to qualify for the final of the competition.

In January 2017, RAI announced they had discovered a 30-minute tape of the festival's final, edited down from the original broadcast, from a collector in Malta. The tape, along with several rehearsal clips from the festival, was uploaded to RAI's streaming service RaiPlay for the festival's 50th anniversary, with an additional prime time broadcast on Rai Premium on 6 February.

== Format ==
The festival was organised by Società ATA, the concessionary of the Sanremo Casino, and held between 26 and 28 January 1967. Gianni Ravera was the artistic director.

The shows took place in the ballroom of the Sanremo Casino, despite initial discussion of moving the festival's venue due to the delayed renewal of its building permit. Following the 1966 edition, which introduced bands into the competition and faced criticism regarding the acoustics in the ballroom not accommodating them, competing bands instead performed in the casino's opera house, with the audience in the ballroom able to watch via television monitors.

=== Voting system ===
The vote in each show was conducted by a regional jury located in fifteen different Italian cities with fifteen members each, of which two thirds were required to be under the age of 25. The cities were chosen by random draw and differed in each show, totalling forty-five cities and six hundred and seventy-five jury members across all three shows. The regional jury decided on six qualifiers in each of the first two nights, with jury members giving one vote to four different songs. A special commission formed by ATA, composed of the festival's artistic director Gianni Ravera, the television director Lino Procacci, journalists Ugo Zatterin and Lello Bersani, as well as the lawyer Luigi Bertolini, chose a seventh qualifier in each night from the songs not selected by the regional jury. As in previous editions, only the winner of the final was to be revealed and all other finalists declared tied runners-up.

== Competing entries ==
243 songs were submitted by music publishers to ATA for the competition. In December 1966, an advisory commission chaired by composer Carlo Savina and composed of the four journalists Sandro Delli Ponti, Rodolfo D'Intino, Vittorio Franchini and Carlo Giovetti narrowed down the list of submissions to thirty-five. ATA then chose thirty entries from the list to compete in the event, increased from the original aim of twenty-six, with two of the entries rejected to prevent possible plagiarism claims if they were to compete.

Among the competing artists were Annarita Spinaci and Roberta Amadei, who were given the right to participate after winning the 1966 edition of the Castrocaro Music Festival for newcomer artists.

Initially American musician Johnny Rivers was announced among the competing artists, set to perform the song "Devi avere fiducia in me", but withdrew before rehearsals. The Hollies were announced as his replacement, before refusing to perform the song and being replaced by Carmelo Pagano. The song "Sopra i tetti azzurri del mio pazzo amore" written and performed by Domenico Modugno, was also set to be performed by French singer Christophe, but due to disagreements with Modugno over his performance, he withdrew from the competition on the day of the first night. He was replaced with Gidiuli, as suggested by Modugno.

Notable figures from abroad were featured in the list of competing artists, such as multi-award-winning American singer Dionne Warwick, American singer and actress Cher, and the English singer-songwriter Marianne Faithfull, who at the time was in a romantic relationship with musician Mick Jagger.

Competing entries
Song	Artist 1	Artist 2	Songwriter(s)
"Bisogna saper perdere"	Lucio Dalla	The Rokes	Ruggero Cini; Giuseppe Cassia
"C'è chi spera"	Riki Maiocchi	Marianne Faithfull	Mario Panzeri; Gene Colonnello; Daniele Pace
"Canta ragazzina"	Bobby Solo	Connie Francis	Iller Pattacini; Prog
"Ciao amore, ciao"	Luigi Tenco	Dalida	Luigi Tenco
"Cuore matto"	Little Tony	Mario Zelinotti	Totò Savio; Armando Ambrosino
"Dedicato all'amore"	Peppino di Capri	Dionne Warwick	Dunnio; Alberto Testa; Daniele Pace
"Devi avere fiducia in me"	Roberta Amadei	Carmelo Pagano	Renato Martini; Francesco Specchia
"Dove credi di andare"	Sergio Endrigo	Memo Remigi	Sergio Endrigo
"E allora dai"	Giorgio Gaber	Remo Germani	Giorgio Gaber
"È più forte di me"	Betty Curtis	Tony Del Monaco	Tony Del Monaco; Enrico Polito
"Gi"	Fred Bongusto	Anna German	Fred Bongusto; Vito Pallavicini; Antonio Amurri
"Guardati alle spalle"	Nicola Di Bari	Gene Pitney	Daniele Pace; Mario Panzeri; Gianfranco Monaldi; Luciano Beretta
"Il cammino di ogni speranza"	Caterina Caselli	Sonny & Cher	Umberto Napolitano
"Io per amore"	Pino Donaggio	Carmen Villani	Pino Donaggio; Vito Pallavicini
"Io, tu e le rose"	Orietta Berti	Les Compagnons de la chanson	Daniele Pace; Mario Panzeri; Brinniti
"L'immensità"	Don Backy	Johnny Dorelli	Detto Mariano; Don Backy; Mogol
"La musica è finita"	Ornella Vanoni	Mario Guarnera	Umberto Bindi; Nisa; Franco Califano
"La rivoluzione"	Gianni Pettenati	Gene Pitney	Piero Soffici; Mogol
"Ma piano (per non svegliarmi)"	Nico Fidenco	Cher	Gianni Meccia
"Nasce una vita"	Jimmy Fontana	Edoardo Vianello	Jimmy Fontana; Sergio Bardotti
"Non pensare a me"	Iva Zanicchi	Claudio Villa	Eros Sciorilli; Alberto Testa
"Non prego per me"	Mino Reitano	The Hollies	Lucio Battisti; Mogol
"Per vedere quanto è grande il mondo"	Wilma Goich	The Bachelors	Carlo Donida; Mogol
"Pietre"	Gian Pieretti	Antoine	Ricky Gianco; Gian Pieretti
"Proposta"	I Giganti	The Bachelors	Giordano Bruno Martelli; Albula
"Quando dico che ti amo"	Annarita Spinaci	Les Surfs	Tony Renis; Alberto Testa
"Quando vedrò"	Los Marcellos Ferial	The Happenings	Carlo Alberto Rossi; Marisa Terzi
"Sopra i tetti azzurri del mio pazzo amore"	Domenico Modugno	Gidiuli	Domenico Modugno; Vito Pallavicini
"Una ragazza"	Donatella Moretti	Bobby Goldsboro	Walter Malgoni; Vito Pallavicini; Bruno Pallesi
"Uno come noi"	Milva	Los Bravos	Giorgio Bertero; Marino Marini; Umberto Martucci

== Shows ==
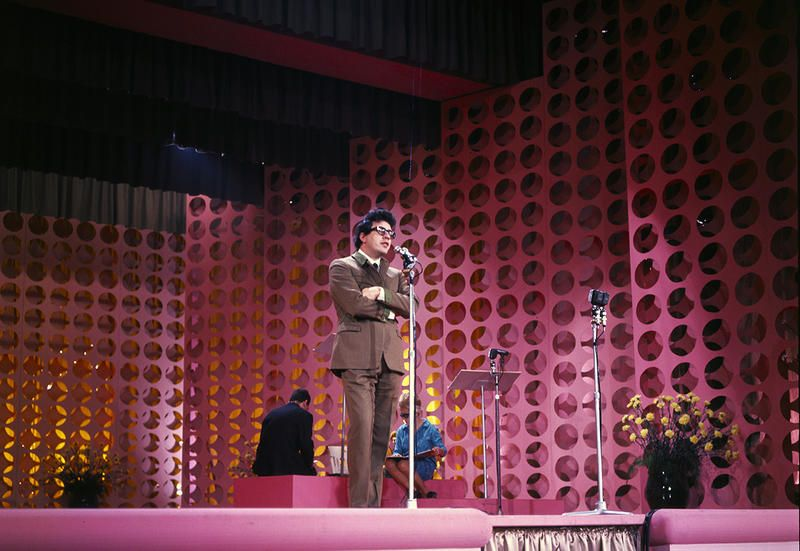
The scenography of Sanremo 1967, with Peppino di Capri performing.

The festival consisted of three live shows between 26 and 28 January 1967. The first two nights consisted of fifteen songs performed twice, in which seven songs would qualify from each, creating a final consisting of fourteen songs performed twice. The shows were presented by Mike Bongiorno and Renata Mauro. The television production was directed by Lino Procacci.

For the first two nights, a draw took place on 24 January to decide the running order, with the songs presented in groups of three during the shows. The final was split into two halves, each containing every song performed once, in an order drawn after the second night.

=== First night ===
The first night took place on 26 January 1967 at 21:15 CET. Fifteen songs were performed and seven were selected for the final.

Regional jury qualifier
Special commission qualifier

First night – 26 January 1967
R/O	Song	Artist 1	Artist 2	Result
1	"E allora dai"	Giorgio Gaber	Remo Germani	Qualified
2	"Canta ragazzina"	Bobby Solo	Connie Francis	—N/a
3	"Gi"	Fred Bongusto	Anna German	—N/a
4	"La musica è finita"	Ornella Vanoni	Mario Guarnera	Qualified
5	"C'è chi spera"	Riki Maiocchi	Marianne Faithfull	—N/a
6	"La rivoluzione"	Gianni Pettenati	Gene Pitney	Qualified
7	"L'immensità"	Johnny Dorelli	Don Backy	Qualified
8	"Non prego per me"	Mino Reitano	The Hollies	—N/a
9	"Ma piano (per non svegliarmi)"	Nico Fidenco	Cher	—N/a
10	"Proposta"	I Giganti	The Bachelors	Qualified
11	"Quando dico che ti amo"	Annarita Spinaci	Les Surfs	Qualified
12	"Io, tu e le rose"	Orietta Berti	Les Compagnons de la chanson	Qualified
13	"Sopra i tetti azzurri del mio pazzo amore"	Domenico Modugno	Gidiuli	—N/a
14	"Quando vedrò"	Los Marcellos Ferial	The Happenings	—N/a
15	"Ciao amore, ciao"	Luigi Tenco	Dalida	—N/a

=== Second night ===
The second night took place on 27 January 1967 at 21:15 CET. Fifteen songs were performed and seven were selected for the final.

Second night – 27 January 1967
R/O	Song	Artist 1	Artist 2	Result
1	"Guardati alle spalle"	Nicola Di Bari	Gene Pitney	—N/a
2	"Il cammino di ogni speranza"	Caterina Caselli	Sonny & Cher	—N/a
3	"Uno come noi"	Milva	Los Bravos	—N/a
4	"Pietre"	Gian Pieretti	Antoine	Qualified
5	"Non pensare a me"	Claudio Villa	Iva Zanicchi	Qualified
6	"Dove credi di andare"	Sergio Endrigo	Memo Remigi	Qualified
7	"Dedicato all'amore"	Peppino di Capri	Dionne Warwick	—N/a
8	"Per vedere quanto è grande il mondo"	Wilma Goich	The Bachelors	Qualified
9	"Una ragazza"	Donatella Moretti	Bobby Goldsboro	—N/a
10	"È più forte di me"	Betty Curtis	Tony Del Monaco	—N/a
11	"Devi avere fiducia in me"	Roberta Amadei	Carmelo Pagano	—N/a
12	"Io per amore"	Pino Donaggio	Carmen Villani	Qualified
13	"Cuore matto"	Mario Zelinotti	Little Tony	Qualified
14	"Nasce una vita"	Jimmy Fontana	Edoardo Vianello	—N/a
15	"Bisogna saper perdere"	Lucio Dalla	The Rokes	Qualified

=== Final night ===
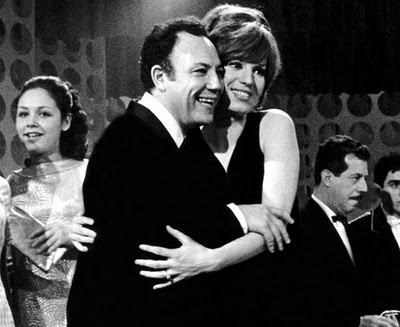
Claudio Villa and Iva Zanicchi upon winning the festival

The final night took place on 28 January 1967 at 21:00 CET. The fourteen songs admitted to the final were performed again and a winner was chosen.

The winning song was "Non pensare a me", written by Alberto Testa and Eros Sciorilli, and performed by Iva Zanicchi and Claudio Villa. This was Villa's fourth victory in the competition as a performer, following his wins in the 1955, 1957 and 1962 editions, tying the record set by Domenico Modugno the previous year. All other finalists were announced as runners-up during the show, with the full results only released unofficially afterwards.

Winner

Final night – 28 January 1967
R/O	Song	Artist 1	Artist 2	Points	Place
1	"Io, tu e le rose"	Orietta Berti	Les Compagnons de la chanson	15	5
2	"Non pensare a me"	Iva Zanicchi	Claudio Villa	45	1
3	"La musica è finita"	Ornella Vanoni	Mario Guarnera	24	4
4	"La rivoluzione"	Gianni Pettenati	Gene Pitney	3	13
5	"L'immensità"	Don Backy	Johnny Dorelli	9	9
6	"Per vedere quanto è grande il mondo"	Wilma Goich	The Bachelors	5	11
7	"Io per amore"	Pino Donaggio	Carmen Villani	5	11
8	"Pietre"	Gian Pieretti	Antoine	11	8
9	"Quando dico che ti amo"	Annarita Spinaci	Les Surfs	43	2
10	"Dove credi di andare"	Sergio Endrigo	Memo Remigi	12	7
11	"Cuore matto"	Little Tony	Mario Zelinotti	8	10
12	"Proposta"	I Giganti	The Bachelors	28	3
13	"Bisogna saper perdere"	Lucio Dalla	The Rokes	14	6
14	"E allora dai"	Giorgio Gaber	Remo Germani	3	13

== Broadcasts ==
=== Local broadcast ===
The final night was broadcast on Programma Nazionale (television) and Secondo Programma (radio) beginning at 21:00 CET, with the first two nights broadcast on Secondo Programma (television) and Secondo Programma (radio) at 21:15 CET. In Italy, the final was broadcast on television to an estimated 21.3 million viewers, with the first and second nights broadcast to an estimated 19.7 and 19.5 million viewers respectively.

=== International broadcast ===
The first half of the final was broadcast via the Eurovision and Intervision networks in other countries. The festival was reportedly broadcast in 57 countries. Known details on the broadcasts in each country, including the specific broadcasting stations and commentators are shown in the tables below.

International broadcasters of the Sanremo Music Festival 1967
Country	Broadcaster	Channel(s)	Commentator(s)	Ref(s)
Argentina	Canal 11 (Note: Delayed three-part broadcast on 13, 20 and 27 March.)			
Belgium	BRT	BRT (Note: Delayed broadcast the next day at 16:25 CET.)	Annemarie Van Dijck	
Belgium	RTB	RTB (Note: Delayed broadcast on 27 February at 22:45 CET.)		
Brazil	Rádio Jornal do Brasil (Note: Delayed broadcast on 2 February at 20:35 BRT.)			
Bulgaria	BT	BT		
Czechoslovakia	ČST	ČST		
Germany	ARD	Deutsches Fernsehen (Note: Delayed broadcast on 7 February at 22:45 CET.)	Otto E. Rock	
Hungary	MR	Kossuth Rádió		
Poland	TP	TV Polska		
Portugal	RTP	RTP		
Soviet Union	CT USSR	Programme Two (Note: Delayed broadcast the following day at 18:50 MSD.)		
Switzerland	SRG SSR	TV DRS		
Switzerland	SRG SSR	TSR	Georges Hardy	
Switzerland	SRG SSR	TSI (Note: Delayed broadcast the following day at 14:40 CET.)		
Switzerland	SRG SSR	Radio Monte Ceneri		
United States	WPIX (Note: Delayed three-part broadcast on 12, 19 and 26 August at 12:00 EST.)			
Yugoslavia	JRT	Televizija Beograd		
Yugoslavia	JRT	Televizija Ljubljana		

== Incidents and controversies ==
=== Death of Luigi Tenco ===
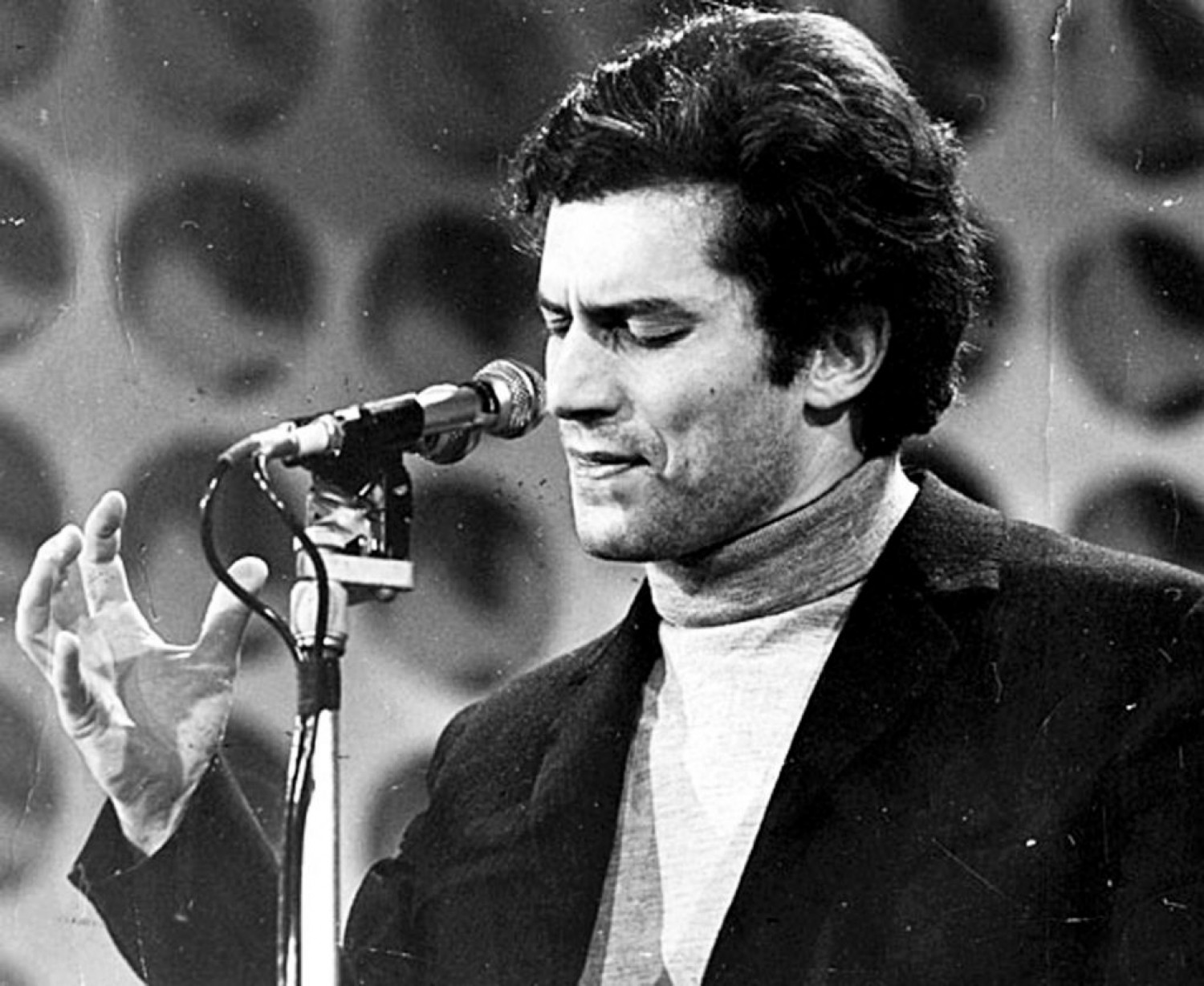
Luigi Tenco performing during rehearsals

During the first night on 26 January, Luigi Tenco performed the song "Ciao amore, ciao" alongside French singer Dalida, which he had written himself. Before going on stage, Tenco was hesitant and had told presenter Mike Bongiorno that it could be his last performance. The song was eliminated from the competition by the regional jury, and was not chosen to advance by the special commission.

In the morning of 27 January, Tenco was found dead in his room at the Hotel Savoy in Sanremo. He died from a single gunshot wound to the head. He was apparently upset at his elimination from the competition, with a suicide note found in the hotel, presumably written by Tenco, explaining his death "as a gesture of dissent against the public who chose 'Io, tu e le rose' for the final night and against the commission that selected 'La rivoluzione'." His death was ruled as a suicide the same night.

After his death, emergency meetings were held between RAI, ATA and record labels regarding the possible cancellation of the festival, but ultimately the event went on as planned. The death was only briefly addressed by Bongiorno at the start of the second night, without mentioning the singer's name. The case was reopened in 2005 and again in 2013, with the verdict remaining a suicide.
