= Sanremo Music Festival 1968 =

Italian song contest (18th edition)

Dates and venue
- First night: 1 February 1968
- Second night: 2 February 1968
- Final night: 3 February 1968
- Venue: Sanremo Casino; Sanremo, Italy

Organisation
- Organiser: Società ATA

Production
- Broadcaster: Radiotelevisione italiana (RAI)
- Director: Enrico Moscatelli
- Artistic director: Gianni Ravera
- Presenters: Pippo Baudo and Luisa Rivelli

Vote
- Number of entries: 24
- Winner: "Canzone per te" Sergio Endrigo and Roberto Carlos

The Sanremo Music Festival 1968 (Italian: Festival di Sanremo 1968), officially the 18th Italian Song Festival (18º Festival della canzone italiana), was the 18th annual Sanremo Music Festival, held at the Sanremo Casino in Sanremo, Italy, between 1 and 3 February 1968. It was organised by Società ATA, concessionary of the Sanremo Casino and was broadcast by Radiotelevisione italiana (RAI). The shows were presented by Pippo Baudo and Luisa Rivelli. Gianni Ravera served as artistic director.

Each song was performed twice by both Italian and foreign artists. The winning song was "Canzone per te" written by Sergio Endrigo and Sergio Bardotti, performed by both Endrigo and Roberto Carlos. The festival was only used to select the artist that would represent Italy at the Eurovision Song Contest, following a change in the contest's song eligibility rules ahead of the 1967 edition, requiring songs to not be commercially released until a month before the contest took place. Therefore, Sergio Endrigo was chosen from the two artists to participate in the Eurovision Song Contest 1968, and went on to compete with the song "Marianne".

In January 2018, restored versions of all three shows were uploaded to RAI's streaming service RaiPlay in collaboration with Rai Teche.

== Format ==
The festival was organised by Società ATA, the concessionary of the Sanremo Casino. Gianni Ravera reprised his role as artistic director for the seventh consecutive year.

=== Voting system ===
Various changes in the voting system were implemented for the edition. The vote in each show was conducted by a jury formed by twenty-six different newspapers, with twenty-five members each set up in their respective newspaper office. Juries were required to be composed of thirteen men and twelve women, with a majority under the age of 25, and have a specific array of professions and social classes. Each jury member gave one vote to seven different songs during the first two nights, while for the final they gave one vote to three songs. Additionally, the festival returned to awarding the top three songs for the first time since 1963, with the top three songs announced at the end of the final and performed again.

== Competing entries ==
ATA received 227 song submissions for the competition. A special commission chaired by composer Carlo Savina including Renzo Arbore, Ivano Davoli, Rodolfo D'Intino and Enrico Gramigna was tasked with selecting twenty-two entries. Eventually, they selected twenty-four to compete.

Among the competing artists were Giusy Romeo and Elio Gandolfi, who were given the right to participate after winning the 1967 edition of the Castrocaro Music Festival for newcomer artists.

Initially American jazz singer Sarah Vaughan was announced among the competing artists, set to perform the song "Che vale per me", but withdrew due to a surgery she had to undergo. She was replaced by Eartha Kitt.

Songs in the rhythm and blues genre were included in the competition for the first time, as well as more jazz compositions than in previous years. Notable artists within these genres, such as American singer Wilson Pickett and renowned American trumpeter and vocalist Louis Armstrong, were featured in the list of competing artists.

Competing entries
Song	Artist 1	Artist 2	Songwriter(s)	Conductor(s)
"Canzone"	Adriano Celentano	Milva	Don Backy; Detto Mariano	Iller Pattacini; Gian Piero Reverberi
"Canzone per te"	Sergio Endrigo	Roberto Carlos	Sergio Endrigo; Sergio Bardotti	Giancarlo Chiaramello; Renato Angiolini
"Casa bianca"	Ornella Vanoni	Marisa Sannia	Eligio La Valle; Don Backy	Gianluigi Guarnieri; Detto Mariano
"Che vale per me"	Peppino Gagliardi	Eartha Kitt	Carlo Alberto Rossi; Marisa Terzi	Piero Soffici; Sauro Sili
"Da bambino"	Massimo Ranieri	I Giganti	Renato Angiolini; Riccardo Pradella	Gianfranco Monaldi; Giordano Bruno Martelli
"Deborah"	Fausto Leali	Wilson Pickett	Paolo Conte; Vito Pallavicini	Gianfranco Intra
"Gli occhi miei"	Wilma Goich	Dino	Carlo Donida; Mogol	Detto Mariano; Franco Pisano
"Il posto mio"	Tony Renis	Domenico Modugno	Tony Renis; Alberto Testa	Franco Pisano
"Il re d'Inghilterra"	Nino Ferrer	Pilade	Nino Ferrer	Pino De Luca
"La farfalla impazzita"	Johnny Dorelli	Paul Anka	Lucio Battisti; Mogol	Angel Pocho Gatti; Franco Pisano
"La siepe"	Al Bano	Bobbie Gentry	Pino Massara; Vito Pallavicini	Detto Mariano; Enrico Intra
"La tramontana"	Gianni Pettenati	Antoine	Daniele Pace; Mario Panzeri	Giancarlo Chiaramello; Guido Lamorgese
"La vita"	Elio Gandolfi	Shirley Bassey	Bruno Canfora; Antonio Amurri	Angelo Giacomazzi; Brian Fahey
"La voce del silenzio"	Tony Del Monaco	Dionne Warwick	Elio Isola; Paolo Limiti; Mogol	Gianfranco Monaldi; Renato Angiolini
"Le opere di Bartolomeo"	The Rokes	The Cowsills	Ruggero Cini; Sergio Bardotti	Ruggero Cini; Detto Mariano
"Le solite cose"	Pino Donaggio	Timi Yuro	Pino Donaggio; Vito Pallavicini	Gian Franco Reverberi; Sauro Sili
"Mi va di cantare"	Lara Saint Paul	Louis Armstrong	Aldo Valleroni; Vincenzo Buonassisi; Giorgio Bertero	Willy Brezza; Henghel Gualdi
"No amore"	Giusy Romeo	Sacha Distel	Enrico Intra; Vito Pallavicini	Enrico Intra
"Per vivere"	Iva Zanicchi	Udo Jürgens	Umberto Bindi; Nisa	Gianfranco Intra; Franco Cassano
"Quando m'innamoro"	Anna Identici	The Sandpipers	Daniele Pace; Roberto Livraghi; Mario Panzeri	Gianfranco Tadini; Renato Angiolini
"Sera"	Gigliola Cinquetti	Giuliana Valci	Roberto Vecchioni; Andrea Lo Vecchio	Gianfranco Monaldi
"Stanotte sentirai una canzone"	Annarita Spinaci	Yoko Kishi	Franco Bracardi; Tato Queirolo	Willy Brezza; Giancarlo Chiaramello
"Tu che non sorridi mai"	Orietta Berti	Piergiorgio Farina	Sauro Sili; Marisa Terzi	Sauro Sili; Tullio Gallo
"Un uomo piange solo per amore"	Little Tony	Mario Guarnera	Marcello Marrocchi; Mimma Gaspari	Willy Brezza; Massimo Salerno

== Shows ==
The festival consisted of three live shows held between 1 and 3 February 1968. The first two nights consisted of twelve songs performed twice, in which seven would qualify, creating a final of fourteen songs performed twice. All shows were presented by Pippo Baudo, his first of thirteen editions as host, along with actress Luisa Rivelli. The television production was directed by Enrico Moscatelli.

Performances could be accompanied by a 36-piece orchestra, along with backing vocals provided by the vocal group I Musicals. For the first time, solo artists could be accompanied on stage by a band of their choice.

A draw took place on 31 January to decide the running order for the first two nights. Songs were presented in groups of three, with the draw also deciding the order artists would perform in. For songs performed by both an Italian and foreign performer, the latter would always perform second. In the final, foreign artists performed exclusively in the second half of the show, while the decision of which half Italian artists would perform in was made by each artist's record label. After the performances in each show concluded, a recap of the competing songs was performed by American jazz musician Lionel Hampton on vibraphone, with accompaniment from the orchestra conducted by Giampiero Boneschi.

=== First night ===
The first night took place on 1 February 1968 at 21:15 CET. Twelve songs were performed and seven were selected for the final.

Qualifier

First night – 1 February 1968
R/O	Song	Artist 1	Artist 2	Points	Place
1	"Un uomo piange solo per amore"	Mario Guarnera	Little Tony	487	3
2	"Le opere di Bartolomeo"	The Rokes	The Cowsills	—N/a	
3	"Le solite cose"	Pino Donaggio	Timi Yuro	—N/a	
4	"No amore"	Giusy Romeo	Sacha Distel	—N/a	
5	"Che vale per me"	Peppino Gagliardi	Eartha Kitt	—N/a	
6	"Sera"	Gigliola Cinquetti	Giuliana Valci	400	5
7	"Gli occhi miei"	Wilma Goich	Dino	499	2
8	"Deborah"	Fausto Leali	Wilson Pickett	415	4
9	"Stanotte sentirai una canzone"	Annarita Spinaci	Yoko Kishi	372	6
10	"Casa bianca"	Marisa Sannia	Ornella Vanoni	531	1
11	"La voce del silenzio"	Tony Del Monaco	Dionne Warwick	322	7
12	"Il re d'Inghilterra"	Nino Ferrer	Pilade	—N/a	

=== Second night ===
The second night took place on 2 February 1968 at 21:15 CET. Twelve songs were performed and seven were selected for the final.

Qualifier

Second night – 2 February 1968
R/O	Song	Artist 1	Artist 2	Points	Place
1	"Canzone per te"	Sergio Endrigo	Roberto Carlos	505	1
2	"Canzone"	Milva	Adriano Celentano	503	2
3	"La siepe"	Al Bano	Bobbie Gentry	370	7
4	"Il posto mio"	Tony Renis	Domenico Modugno	—N/a	
5	"La vita"	Elio Gandolfi	Shirley Bassey	—N/a	
6	"Per vivere"	Iva Zanicchi	Udo Jürgens	—N/a	
7	"La farfalla impazzita"	Johnny Dorelli	Paul Anka	—N/a	
8	"Tu che non sorridi mai"	Orietta Berti	Piergiorgio Farina	—N/a	
9	"La tramontana"	Gianni Pettenati	Antoine	485	3
10	"Quando m'innamoro"	Anna Identici	The Sandpipers	447	4
11	"Da bambino"	Massimo Ranieri	I Giganti	412	6
12	"Mi va di cantare"	Lara Saint Paul	Louis Armstrong	420	5

=== Final night ===
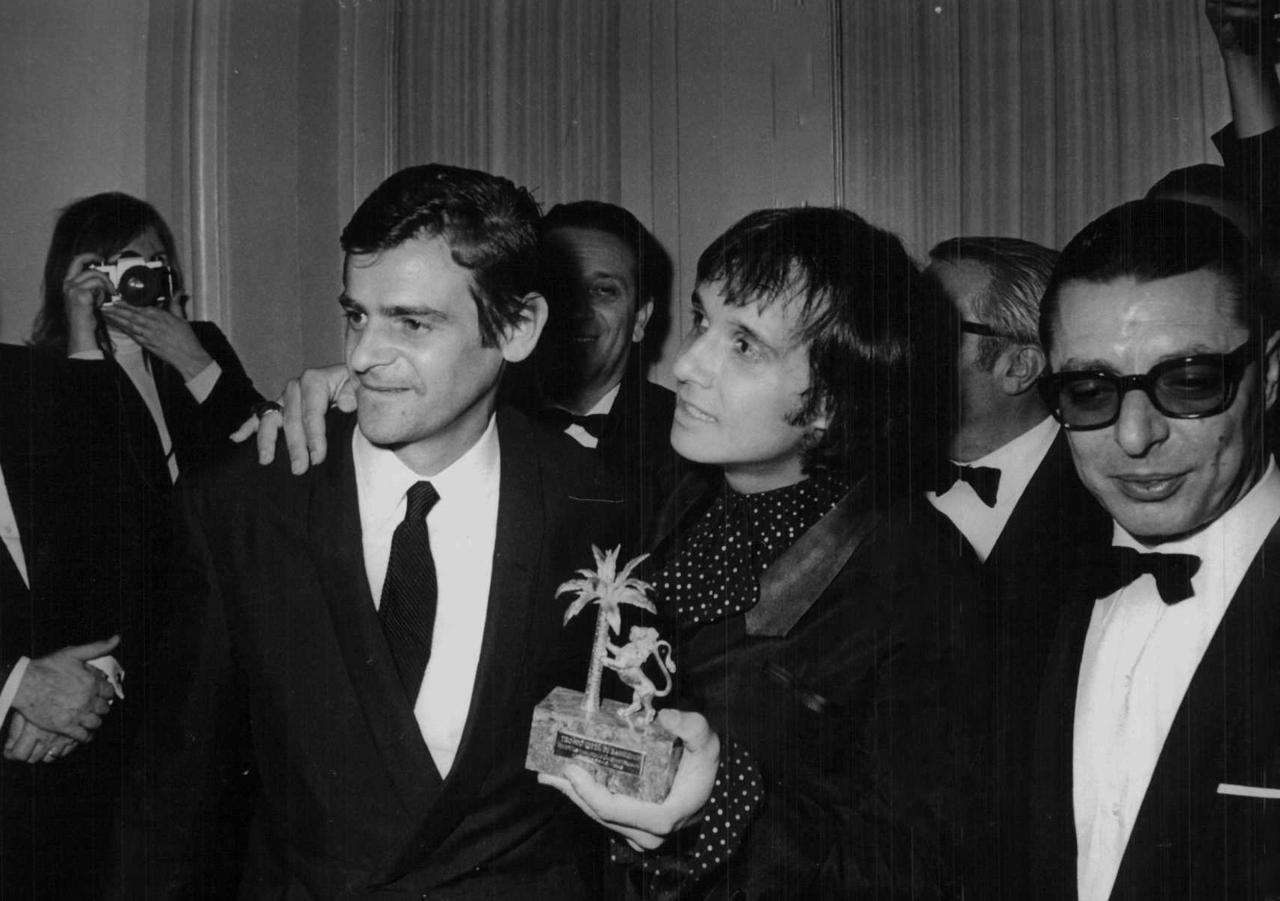
Sergio Endrigo (left) and Roberto Carlos holding the first prize

The final night took place on 3 February 1968 at 21:00 CET. The fourteen songs admitted to the final were performed again and a winner was chosen. The show opened with a medley consisting of songs from past editions of the festival: "Piove" by Domenico Modugno, "Quando vien la sera" by Joe Sentieri, "Quando, quando, quando" by Tony Renis and "Non pensare a me" by Claudio Villa.

The winning song was "Canzone per te" written by Sergio Endrigo and Sergio Bardotti, performed by both Endrigo and Brazilian singer Roberto Carlos, with "Casa bianca" written by Don Backy and Eligio La Valle, performed by Ornella Vanoni and Marisa Sannia placing second; and "Canzone" written by Don Backy and Detto Mariano, performed by Adriano Celentano and Milva placing third. Performances of the top three songs were repeated at the end of the show, with the exception of Celentano's rendition of "Canzone", as he refused to appear on stage.

Winner

Final night – 3 February 1968
R/O	Song	Artist 1	Artist 2	Points	Place
1	"La tramontana"	Gianni Pettenati	Antoine	176	5
2	"Canzone per te"	Sergio Endrigo	Roberto Carlos	306	1
3	"La siepe"	Al Bano	Bobbie Gentry	92	9
4	"Mi va di cantare"	Lara Saint Paul	Louis Armstrong	49	13
5	"Gli occhi miei"	Wilma Goich	Dino	71	11
6	"Casa bianca"	Ornella Vanoni	Marisa Sannia	255	2
7	"Sera"	Gigliola Cinquetti	Giuliana Valci	97	8
8	"Stanotte sentirai una canzone"	Annarita Spinaci	Yoko Kishi	53	12
9	"Da bambino"	Massimo Ranieri	I Giganti	123	7
10	"Un uomo piange solo per amore"	Little Tony	Mario Guarnera	83	10
11	"Quando m'innamoro"	Anna Identici	The Sandpipers	126	6
12	"La voce del silenzio"	Tony Del Monaco	Dionne Warwick	28	14
13	"Deborah"	Fausto Leali	Wilson Pickett	224	4
14	"Canzone"	Adriano Celentano	Milva	251	3

== Broadcasts ==
=== Local broadcast ===
The final was broadcast on Programma Nazionale (television) and Secondo Programma (radio) beginning at 21:00 CET, with the first two nights broadcast on Secondo Programma (television) and Secondo Programma (radio) at 21:15 CET. In Italy, the final was broadcast on television to an estimated 20.1 million viewers, with the first and second nights broadcast to an estimated 18.7 and 18.3 million viewers respectively.

=== International broadcast ===
The first half of the final was broadcast via the Eurovision network in other countries. Known details on the broadcasts in each country, including the specific broadcasting stations and commentators are shown in the tables below.

International broadcasters of the Sanremo Music Festival 1968
Country	Broadcaster	Channel(s)	Commentator(s)	Ref(s)
Argentina	Canal 9 (Note: Delayed five-part broadcast on 1, 8, 15, 22 and 29 March at 22:30 (ART))			
Belgium	BRT	BRT (Note: Delayed broadcast on 11 February 1968 at 17:00 (CET))		
Bulgaria	BT	BT		
Czechoslovakia	ČsR	Rádio Slovensko (Note: Delayed broadcast on 10 March 1968 at 15:20 CEST)		
Germany	ARD	Deutsches Fernsehen (Note: Delayed broadcast on 27 February 1968 at 22:55 (CET))	Wolf Mittler	
Hungary	MTV	MTV		
Hungary	MR	Kossuth Rádió		
Poland	TP	Telewizja Polska		
Romania	TVR	TVR		
Spain	TVE	TVE 1		
Spain	RNE	RNE, Radio Peninsular de Barcelona		
Switzerland	SRG SSR	TV DRS (Note: Delayed broadcast the following day at 21:35 (CET))		
Switzerland	SRG SSR	TSR (Note: Delayed broadcast the following day at 22:10 (CET))	Georges Hardy	
Switzerland	SRG SSR	TSI (Note: Delayed broadcast the following day at 17:00 (CET))		
Switzerland	SRG SSR	Radio Monte Ceneri		
Yugoslavia	JRT	Televizija Beograd		
Yugoslavia	JRT	Televizija Ljubljana		
Yugoslavia	JRT	Televizija Zagreb		

== Incidents and controversies ==
=== Dispute over Don Backy's participation ===
Two songs written by singer-songwriter Don Backy were accepted into the competition: "Casa bianca" and "Canzone", the latter of which he intended to perform at the festival himself. However, in 1967 the singer made accusations towards his record label Clan Celentano of altering the accounting of his record sales. As a result, manager of the label Adriano Celentano held a press conference on 15 December announcing he would sue the singer for defamation and personally replace Backy as the performer for "Canzone" at the festival, as the label had final say over the choice of performer.

Despite Celentano's half-hearted performances of "Canzone" to spite Backy, the song went on to achieve third place at the festival. At the end of the show, Celentano refused to appear on stage to reprise his performance. He later stated he made the decision because he "couldn't tolerate that the victory went to Endrigo".

=== Dispute over Eartha Kitt's participation ===
The American jazz singer Sarah Vaughan was initially announced as a competing artist in the festival, set to perform the song "Che vale per me", but later withdrew after being admitted to a hospital and having to undergo surgery. ATA announced that Eartha Kitt would replace her. The decision was not supported by one of the song's writers, Carlo Alberto Rossi, who after hearing her rehearsal performance on 31 January, claimed she was unfit to perform the song and falsely announced her withdrawal from the competition. He also made a request to ATA to play Vaughan's studio recording during the show, which was subsequently denied for being against the competition's rules. Gianni Ravera, the festival's artistic director, made a statement confirming Kitt would remain the performer, as her participation was contractually bound to ATA.
