= Ciao amore, ciao =

1967 single by Luigi Tenco and Dalida

Single by Luigi Tenco
- Language: Italian
- B-side: "E se ci diranno"
- Released: January 1967
- Genre: Ballad
- Length: 3:00
- Label: RCA Italiana; Ricordi
- Songwriter: Luigi Tenco

Luigi Tenco singles chronology
"Lontano, lontano" (1966)	"Ciao amore, ciao" (1967)	"Quando" (1967)

Audio
- "Ciao amore, ciao" on YouTube

"Ciao amore, ciao"

Single by Dalida

from the album Dalida
- Language: Italian
- B-side: "Il sole muore"
- Released: January 1967
- Genre: Ballad; chanson
- Length: 3:11
- Label: Barclay; RCA Italiana
- Songwriter: Luigi Tenco
- Producer: Paolo Dossena

Dalida singles chronology
"Bang Bang" (1966)	"Ciao amore, ciao" (1967)	"Les Grilles de ma maison" (1967)

Alternative cover
- Cover of the French-language version (Note: The French-language version of "Ciao amore, ciao" was not released as an independent single but featured on the B-side to the EP Mama. It charted in France and Belgium via this edition.)

Audio
- "Ciao amore, ciao" on YouTube

"Ciao amore, ciao" (Italian pronunciation: [ˈtʃaːo aˈmoːre ˈtʃaːo]; "Bye, My Love, Bye") is a 1967 song written by Italian singer-songwriter Luigi Tenco, first performed at the Sanremo Music Festival 1967, in two separate renditions, by Tenco and Italian-French singer Dalida.

The song is best remembered for being Tenco's last performance before his apparent suicide on 27 January 1967, upon its elimination from the contest. One month later, Dalida, who was dating Tenco at the time of his death, attempted suicide as well.

== History ==
=== Writing and recording ===
Tenco spent a long time crafting the lyrics for "Ciao amore, ciao", writing around ten different versions before the final one. In the process, he sought counseling from Mogol, with whom he had collaborated for "Se stasera sono qui", who found that the lyrics were perfect the way they were.

The earliest known version of the lyrics was elaborated with Sergio Bardotti; closely following Bob Dylan's "Rainy Day Women Nos. 12 & 35", it was a call to get rid of "false values". These lyrics were used in a later recording by Nicola Di Bari titled after the opening line "Il mondo gira" ("The World Spins").

The penultimate version of the lyrics, which is the best known besides the official release, was titled "Li vidi tornare" ("I Saw Them Come Back") and was vocally antimilitaristic. While his record label, RCA Italiana, deemed this version too "extreme" and advised him to amend it, Tenco recorded it in full; following the same musical structure as the final revision, it would only be published in 1972.

Tenco was reportedly unconvinced even of the final version, but shortly after meeting Dalida at the RCA Italiana headquarters in Rome in 1966, she persuaded him to submit it for participation in the Sanremo Festival. That summer, the pair decided that both of them would perform "Ciao amore, ciao", and they were ultimately admitted to the competition. The song was finally set to a pop arrangement by Gian Piero Reverberi.

The original title of the song was "Ciao amore". For legal reasons, a second ciao was added about three weeks before the Sanremo Festival.

=== Sanremo Music Festival 1967 ===
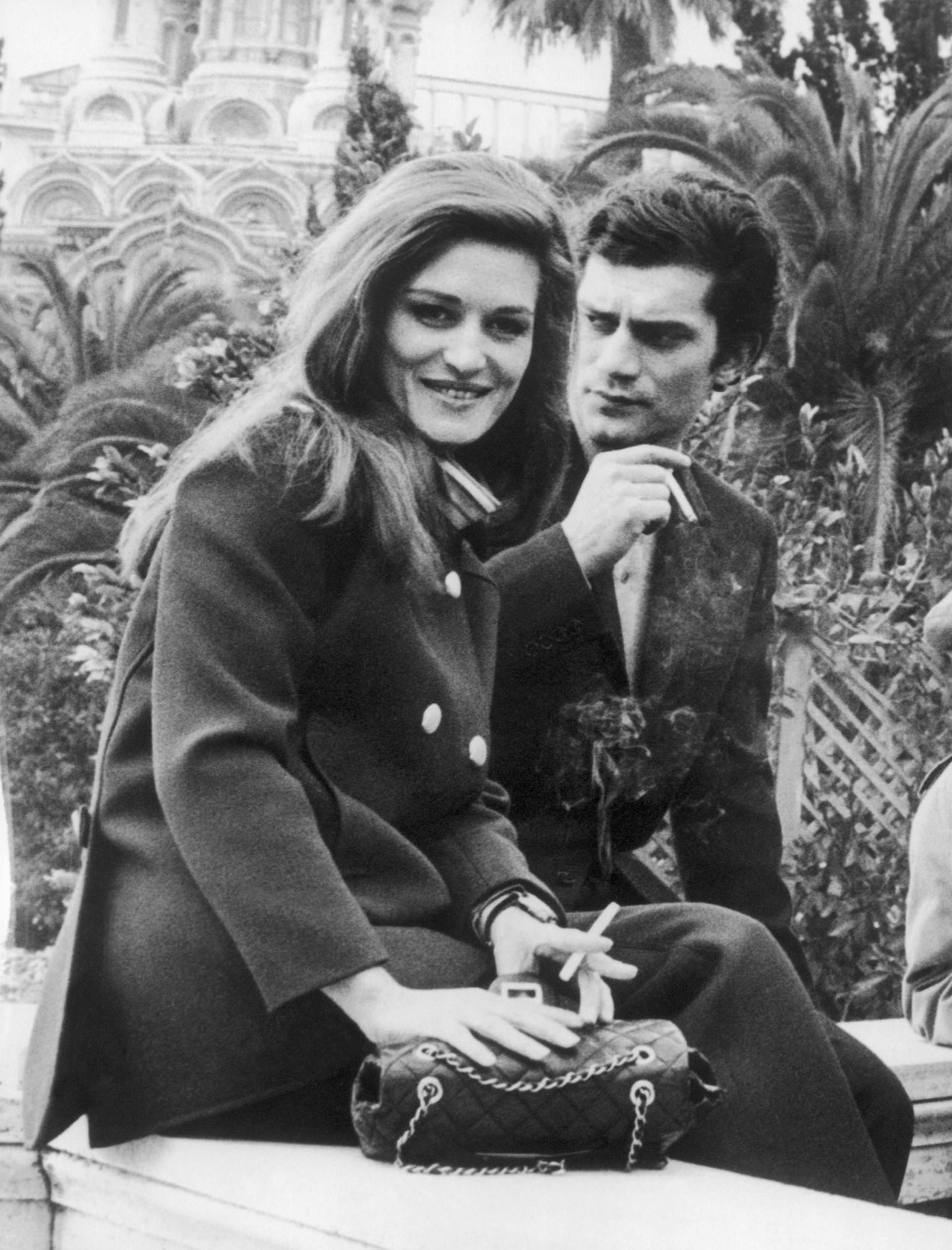
Dalida and Tenco in Sanremo, January 1967

The night before the start of the Sanremo Music Festival 1967, Tenco asked for some of his friends' opinion on "Ciao amore, ciao", promising that he would treat them to dinner in case of victory.

According to journalistic accounts, Dalida's performance during the rehearsals came off better than Tenco's. The two premiered the song on the first night of the competition on 26 January 1967, with Tenco telling presenter Mike Bongiorno, before getting on stage, "This is the last time;" Bongiorno later recounted having thought that Tenco had chosen to end his artistic career. Tenco's performance of "Ciao amore, ciao" was negatively impacted by the assumption of a medicinal drug and a pear grappa, with the conductor Reverberi himself having a hard time keeping up with him. Dalida was also heard backstage complaining that he was "spoiling the song."

"Ciao amore, ciao" obtained a score of 38/900 and placed 12th out of 16, being set for elimination. The repechage commission, composed of Gianni Ravera, Ugo Zatterin, Lino Procacci, Lello Bersani and Gianni delli Ponti, ultimately voted for "La rivoluzione" by Gianni Pettenati and Gene Pitney. Upon being informed of his elimination, Tenco had a fit of rage against Marcello Minerbi, who had introduced him to a musical career, and Dalida tried to calm him by inviting him for a toast. A few hours later, Dalida herself found Tenco's dead body, killed by gunshot, in his hotel room, next to an apparent suicide note explaining the gesture as "an act of protest against the audience who sent 'Io, tu e le rose' to the final and the commission who selected 'La rivoluzione'."

=== Aftermath ===
Due to the public's emotional outpour for Tenco's death, all the 80,000 copies of the single that had been distributed by RCA sold out by 30 January 1967 at midday, twice the label's prior estimate of 40,000 sales; on that day, an additional 70,000 copies were ordered. One month later, sales reached 300,000.

Dalida went on to release French- and German-language versions of "Ciao amore, ciao" for foreign markets.

== Composition and lyrics ==
"Ciao amore, ciao" (Dalida version)

The song's original key is G major. Tenco's version starts directly with the first stanza, while Dalida's opens with an instrumental intro.

The lyrical content has both the features of a love song and those of a protest song against contemporary society. It deals with a person who is set to leave the countryside – where their survival depends on the weather conditions – for the city, in search of new opportunities; however, in order to do so, they must leave their lover behind. A feeling of disorientation, nostalgia and desire to return to one's hometown subsequently arises in the protagonist.

== Track listings ==
=== Tenco version ===
7" single – Italy (RCA Italiana PM 45 3387, 1967)
7" single – Brazil (RCA Victor LC-16155, 1967)
7" single – France (RCA Victor 49 507, 1967)
7" single – Germany (RCA Victor 47 9757, 1967)
7" single – Spain (RCA Victor 3 10213, 1967)

1. "Ciao amore, ciao" (Luigi Tenco) – 3:00
2. "E se ci diranno" (Luigi Tenco) – 2:22

7" EP – Brazil (RCA Victor LCD-3127, 1967)

  1. "Ciao amore, ciao (Tchau amor, adeus)" (Luigi Tenco) – 3:00
  2. "E se ci diranno (E se nos disserem)" (Luigi Tenco) – 2:22
  1. "Se sapessi come fai (Se eu soubesse como fazes)" (Luigi Tenco) – 2:50
  2. "Un giorno dopo l'altro (Um dia após o outro)" (Jacques Chaumelle, Luigi Tenco) – 2:48

=== Dalida version ===
7" single – Italy (Barclay 45BN 7010, 1967)
7" single – Germany (Barclay M 937, 1967)

1. "Ciao amore, ciao" (Luigi Tenco) – 3:11
2. "Il sole muore" (Harry Pease, Larry Vincent, Sergio Bardotti, Romolo Forlai) – 2:37

7" single – France (Barclay 60 790, 1967)

1. "Ciao amore, ciao" (Luigi Tenco, Pierre Delanoë) – 3:08
2. "Mon cœur est fou" (Totò Savio, Armando Ambrosino, Jean-Max Rivière, Gérard Bourgeois) – 2:38

7" single – Germany (Barclay M 944, 1967)

1. "Ciao amore, ciao" (Luigi Tenco, Ernst Bader) – 3:15
2. "Mama" (Sonny Bono, Christian Bruhn, Georg Buschor) – 3:36

7" single – Turkey (Barclay BRC 1026, 1967)

1. "Ciao amore, ciao" (Luigi Tenco, Pierre Delanoë) – 3:08
2. "Ne reviens pas mon amour" (Billy Nencioli) – 3:06

== Personnel ==
=== Tenco version ===
- Luigi Tenco – lead vocals
- I 4+4 di Nora Orlandi – choir
- Gian Piero Reverberi – conductor

=== Dalida version ===
- Dalida – lead vocals
- Ruggero Cini – conductor
- Paolo Dossena – producer

== Charts ==
=== Weekly charts ===
Weekly chart performance for "Ciao amore, ciao" (Luigi Tenco)
Chart (1967)	Peak position
Italy (Musica e dischi)	5

Weekly chart performance for "Ciao amore, ciao" (Dalida)
Chart (1967)	Peak position
Belgium (Wallonia)	24
France (SNEP)	16
Italy (Musica e dischi)	26

Weekly chart performance for "Ciao amore, ciao" (joint sales)
Chart (1967)	Peak position
Argentina	1

=== Year-end charts ===
Year-end chart performance for "Ciao amore, ciao" (Luigi Tenco)
Chart (1967)	Position
Italy (Musica e dischi)	40

== Cover versions and usage ==
"Ciao amore, ciao" has been covered by numerous artists on their albums, including Steven Brown (1988), Eugenio Finardi (2001), Renato Sellani (2001), Giuni Russo (2002, from an earlier live performance), Gianna Nannini (2015), Franco Simone (2016) and Peter Hammill (2021), and as a single by Giusy Ferreri (featuring samplings from Tenco's recording, 2010) and Bianca Atzei (featuring Alex Britti, 2015).

It has been performed on another three occasions at the Sanremo Music Festival: by guest Edoardo Bennato in 2010, and by contestants Marco Mengoni in 2013 and Bianca Atzei in 2015.

Dalida's rendition of the song was included in the soundtrack to James Ivory's A Soldier's Daughter Never Cries (1998).

== Sources ==
- Anselmi, Eddy (2009). Festival di Sanremo. Almanacco della Canzone Italiana (in Italian). Modena: Panini.
- Borgna, Gianni (1999). L'Italia di Sanremo (in Italian). Milan: Mondadori. ISBN 9788804436386. OL 24966009M.
- Salvatori, Dario (2000). Dizionario delle canzoni italiane (in Italian). Rome: ElleU Multimedia.
