= La voce del silenzio =

Song by Tony Del Monaco and Dionne Warwick at the Sanremo Music Festival 1968
- Language: Italian
- English title: "The Voice of Silence"
- Published: February 1968
- Recorded: February 1968
- Genre: Pop
- Length: 3:09
- Label: CGD (T. Del Monaco); Scepter (D. Warwick)
- Composer: Elio Isola
- Lyricists: Paolo Limiti and Mogol

"La voce del silenzio" (Italian: [la ˈvoːtʃe del siˈlɛntsjo]; English: "The Voice of Silence") is a 1968 song composed by Elio Isola (music), Paolo Limiti and Mogol (lyrics). The song premiered at the 18th edition of the Sanremo Music Festival with a double performance of Tony Del Monaco and Dionne Warwick, placing at the 14th place with 28 points achieved (that is, last of the finalists).

== Inspiration, Covers, and Adaptations ==
The opening bars of the melody evoke Johann Sebastian Bach's Prelude in C minor, from Book II of his Well-Tempered Clavier series.

The song was later covered by numerous artists including Mina, Mia Martini, Aphrodite's Child, Andrea Bocelli, and others.

== Track listings ==
=== Tony Del Monaco version ===
7" single - CGD N 9675

1. "La voce del silenzio" (Elio Isola, Paolo Limiti, Mogol)
2. "Una piccola candela" (Enrico Polito, Tony Del Monaco, Giancarlo Guardabassi)

=== Dionne Warwick version ===
7" single - Scepter SC 717

1. "La voce del silenzio" (Elio Isola, Paolo Limiti, Mogol)
2. "Unchained Melody" (Alex North, Hy Zaret)
