= Dalida (album) =

Studio album by Dalida
- Released: 1967
- Recorded: 1966–1967
- Genre: World music; pop; rock and roll
- Label: Barclay Records; RCA

Dalida chronology
Pensiamoci ogni sera (1966)	Dalida (1967)	Olympia 67 (1967)

Dalida, sometimes known as Piccolo ragazzo after its opening track, is an Italian album by Dalida, released in 1967. It shares some songs with the previous 1966's Pensiamoci ogni sera and contains two of Dalida's #1 hits, namely "Bang Bang" and "Mama", and her lover Luigi Tenco's "Ciao amore, ciao".

== Track listing ==
  1. "Piccolo ragazzo"
  2. "Amo"
  3. "Bang Bang"
  4. "Stivaletti rossi"
  5. "Sola più che mai"
  6. "Mama"
  1. "Cuore matto"
  2. "Il mio male sei"
  3. "Ciao amore, ciao"
  4. "Pensiamoci ogni sera"
  5. "Cominciamo ad amarci"
  6. "Il silenzio"

== Charts ==
Year-end chart performance for Dalida
Chart (1967)	Position
Italy (Musica e dischi)	8
