= Arrivederci =

Arrivederci ("Goodbye" in Italian) may refer to:

- "Arrivederci" (song), by Umberto Bindi, 1959
- Arrivederci, an album by Vittorio Grigolo, 2011
- "Arrivederci", a song by Warm Guns from Italiano Moderno, 1981
- Arrivederci, a 2008 film by Valeriu Jereghi
- "Arrivederci" (The White Lotus), a 2022 TV episode
