= Il Silenzio =

Il Silenzio may refer to:

- Il silenzio, an album by Dalida
- Il Silenzio (song), a song by Nini Rosso
