= Pensiamoci ogni sera =

Studio album by Dalida
- Released: 1966
- Recorded: 1965–1966
- Genre: World music; pop; rock and roll
- Label: Barclay

Dalida chronology
Il silenzio (1965)	Pensiamoci ogni sera (1966)	Dalida (1967)

Pensiamoci ogni sera is an Italian album by Dalida. It contains two of her best Top 10 hits in Italy: the #1 "La danza di Zorba" and "Il silenzio".

== Track listing ==
1. Pensiamoci ogni sera
2. La danza di Zorba
3. Devo imparare
4. Il sole muore
5. El Cordobes
6. Ascoltami
7. Il silenzio
8. Flamenco
9. Va da lei
10. Questo amore è per sempre
11. Toi pardonne-moi
12. Un grosso scandalo

== See also ==
- Dalida
- List of Dalida songs
- Dalida albums discography
- Dalida singles discography
