= The Seven Cervi Brothers =

- Directed by: Gianni Puccini
- Written by: Cesare Zavattini
- Cinematography: Mario Montuori
- Music by: Carlo Rustichelli
- Release date: 1968
- Country: Italy

The Seven Cervi Brothers (Italian: I sette fratelli Cervi) is a 1968 Italian drama film directed by Gianni Puccini. The film recounts the last days of life during the resistance of the anti-fascist Cervi Brothers. The director Puccini died a few months after the end of production. The film was long blocked by the Italian censorship.

== Plot ==
Aldo Cervi, who distanced himself from Catholicism after meeting the Communist Ferrari in the prison of Reggio Emilia, became a promoter, among his six brothers, of resistance to Fascism. He met the actress of a traveling theater, Lucia Sarzi, who is actually a member of the clandestine anti-fascist movement, Aldo binds himself politically to his ideas. From this meeting, the Cervi brothers get the impulse to participate even more actively in the fight. While his parents host former Allies prisoners in their house, hunted by the nazifascists, Aldo goes to the mountains, with a group of other partisans. Back home momentarily, he is captured with his brothers by the fascists. At the end of December 1943, in the Reggio Emilia shooting range, the execution of the seven brothers and Quarto Camurri takes place.

== Cast ==
- Gian Maria Volonté as Aldo Cervi
- Lisa Gastoni as Lucia Sarzi
- Carla Gravina as Verina
- Riccardo Cucciolla as Gelindo Cervi
- Don Backy as Agostino Cervi
- Renzo Montagnani as Ferdinando Cervi
- Serge Reggiani as Ferrari
- Oleg Zhakov (credited as Oleg Jakov) as Alcide Cervi
- Andrea Checchi as Italian Communist Party member
- Duilio Del Prete as Dante Castellucci
- Gabriella Pallotta as wife of Agostino Cervi
