= Canzone per te =

Song by Sergio Endrigo

"Canzone per te" ("A song for you"), written by Italian composer Sergio Endrigo. The song won the 1968 edition of the Sanremo Music Festival, with a double performance by Endrigo and Roberto Carlos.

== Cover versions ==
The song has been the subject of numerous reinterpretations by other artists. In 1968 Mina recorded her own version in Italian and one in Spanish and in the same year Giorgio Carnini performed an instrumental version for his album Giorgio Carnini - All'Organo Hammond X-66, also published in Turkey and Venezuela. Sergio Franchi recorded an English-language version of this song ("I Wrote a Song For You") on his 1968 RCA Victor album Wine and Song. Also in 1968 the group Los Catinos performed a Spanish version entitled "Canción para tí", later included in their 1991 album Canciones románticas.

In 1974 the Portuguese singer Amália Rodrigues performed it in Italian for her album Amalia in Italy. Other versions in Italian were later recorded by Ornella Vanoni, Claudio Baglioni and Gianni Morandi. In 1989 Enrico Ruggeri recorded the song on his album Contatti. In 1992 George Dalaras with Haris & Panos Katsimihas recorded a version of it in the album Iparhi logos.

In 2003 Orietta Berti recorded a cover version in her album Emozione d'autore. Elisa interpreted the song at the Sanremo Music Festival 2010. Simone Cristicchi proposed a cover version at the Sanremo Music Festival 2013, in the "Sanremo Story" night.

== Charts ==
Sergio Endrigo version

Chart	Peak position
Italy (Musica e dischi)	2

Roberto Carlos version

Chart	Peak position
Italy (Musica e dischi)	5
