= Poppea: A Prostitute in Service of the Emperor =

1972 film

- Directed by: Alfonso Brescia
- Written by: Mario Amendola; Alfonso Brescia; Vittorio Vighi
- Starring: Femi Benussi; Don Backy
- Cinematography: Franco Villa
- Edited by: Vincenzo Vanni
- Music by: Carlo Savina
- Release date: 1972
- Language: Italian

Poppea: A Prostitute in Service of the Emperor (Italian: Poppea... una prostituta al servizio dell'impero) is a 1972 commedia sexy all'italiana film co-written and directed by Alfonso Brescia starring Femi Benussi and Don Backy.

== Cast ==
- Femi Benussi as Poppea
- Don Backy as Ottone
- Peter Landers as Savio
- Vittorio Caprioli as Nero
- Linda Sini as Agrippina
- Eva Czemerys as Virgin of Cappadocia
- Esmeralda Barros as Tortilla
- Howard Ross as Tigellino
- Giancarlo Badessi
- Mimmo Poli
- Nello Pazzafini
- Andrea Scotti
- Carla Mancini

== Production ==
The film was produced by Luis Film. As with other Alfonso Brescia productions of the time, it reuses scenes from other 1960s peplum films. According to screenwriter Vittorio Vighi, the Terence Hill and Bud Spencer duo was the inspiration for the characters played by Don Backy and Peter Landers.

== Release ==
The film was released in Italian cinemas on 21 November 1972.

== Reception ==
Italian film critic Marco Giusti described it as funny and better than expected. According to Derek Elley, it is a film that "with its floating morality, picaresque leads, arena scenes, convenient baptism and final miracle, satirises the popular aspects of the [epic] genre". Paolo Mereghetti described it as "a failed attempt to mix a parody of the sword-and-sandal genre, the spaghetti western fistfights, and a bit of sexy comedy".
