= Canzone (Don Backy song) =

Single by Don Backy
- B-side: "I Got a Woman"
- Released: 1968
- Genre: Pop ballad
- Length: 3:10
- Label: Clan
- Songwriter(s): Don Backy, Detto Mariano

Don Backy singles chronology
| "E facimmoce 'a croce" (1968) | "Canzone" (1968) | "Casa bianca" (1968) |

Audio
- "Canzone" on YouTube

"Canzone" is a 1968 song composed by Don Backy and Detto Mariano. It placed third at the 18th edition of the Sanremo Music Festival with a double performance by Adriano Celentano and Milva.

== Overview ==
The song was composed by Don Backy shortly before a clash with his producer Adriano Celentano, who was accused and sued by Backy for having allegedly altered the accounting of his record sales under his label Clan Celentano.

Don Backy originally planned to present the song at the Sanremo Festival in a double performance with Milva, but, being his producer, Celentano had the final say about the artists chosen to perform his label's songs at the festival, and he chose to replace Don Backy with himself. Celentano's performance at the Festival was received by critics as half-hearted and lacking commitment, and was reportedly meant to be a spiteful snub to his former friend; during the interviews he also asserted the mediocrity of the song, declaring that its B-side "Un bimbo sul leone" was much superior. In spite of that, the song was well received by the festival's audience, with Celentano even receiving a standing ovation, and eventually placed third. At the award ceremony Celentano did not show up and refused to perform the song again. Don Backy later claimed that if he had been able to perform the song he would have won the festival, and that Celentano's version had nothing to do with his composition, as "it had no soul, as if they were notes put together by pure chance".

Don Backy's version of the song eventually proved to be the most successful at the hit parade. Artists who recorded the song also include Massimo Ranieri, Mango, Lionel Hampton, and Enrico Intra.

== Track listing ==
Don Backy version

| No. | Title | Writer(s) | Length |
|---|---|---|---|
| 1. | "Canzone" | Don Backy, Detto Mariano | 3:10 |
| 2. | "I Got a Woman" | Don Backy, Ray Charles | 6:45 |

Adriano Celentano version

| No. | Title | Writer(s) | Length |
|---|---|---|---|
| 1. | "Canzone" | Don Backy, Detto Mariano | 2:44 |
| 2. | "Un bimbo sul leone" | Gino Santercole, Luciano Beretta, Miki Del Prete | 3:38 |

== Charts ==
Don Backy version

| Chart (1968) | Peak position |
|---|---|
| Italy (Musica e dischi) | 2 |

Adriano Celentano version

| Chart (1968) | Peak position |
|---|---|
| Italy (Musica e dischi) | 3 |
