= Cuore matto... matto da legare =

- Italian theatrical release poster by Renato Casaro
- Directed by: Mario Amendola
- Written by: Bruno Corbucci; Mario Amendola
- Produced by: Italo Zingarelli
- Starring: Little Tony
- Cinematography: Sandro D'Eva
- Music by: Willy Brezza
- Distributed by: Variety Distribution
- Release date: 1967
- Country: Italy
- Language: Italian

Cuore matto... matto da legare (Italian for Mad heart... mad as a hatter) is a 1967 Italian "musicarello" film directed by Mario Amendola. It is named after the Little Tony's hit song "Cuore matto".

== Plot ==
Tony, a young singer who has returned to Rome from the United States, meets Carla at the airport, a beautiful architecture student he falls in love with.

The boy, who wants to continue the musical activity, forms a band with two friends, Marco and Sandro, also managing to perform live and get noticed by a Rai official: his parents, however, who are against these choices and they would prefer to see their son working in their butcher shop, they try to arrange a marriage for him with a girl friend of the family, Cesira, to make him settle down.

While Tony is walking with Cesira trying to get rid of her, he is seen by Carla who, jealous, decides not to see him again: the intervention of the two friends Marco and Sandro, who suggest that he invent a twin brother, Pompeo, who would be been walking with Cesira in Tony's place, instead of being decisive it will complicate things.

In the end, after some ups and downs, the story will end with a happy ending for the two young people.

== Cast ==
- Little Tony: Tony
- Eleonora Brown: Carla
- Ferruccio Amendola: Sandro
- Rossella Bergamonti: Camilla
- Anna Campori: Teresa
- Maria Pia Casilio: Erminia
- Lucio Flauto: Marco
- Elsa Vazzoler: Cesira
- Ignazio Leone: Lo Pece
- Alfredo Rizzo: Ravazzetti
- Alberto Sorrentino
