= Loves, Beds and Betrayals =

1977 film

- Directed by: Alfonso Brescia
- Written by: Mauro Righi
- Produced by: Mauro Righi
- Starring: Don Backy; Marisa Mell
- Cinematography: Giuseppe Aquari
- Edited by: Vincenzo Vanni
- Music by: Sante Maria Romitelli
- Release date: 1977
- Language: Italian

Loves, Beds and Betrayals (Italian: Amori, letti e tradimenti) is a 1977 commedia sexy all'italiana film co-written and directed by Alfonso Brescia starring Marisa Mell and Don Backy.

== Cast ==
- Marisa Mell as Greta
- Don Backy as Baldo
- Ugo Bologna as Commendator Mordacchia
- Sonia Viviani as Paola Mordacchia
- Malisa Longo as Maria
- Enzo Spitaleri as Giulietto
- Franco Cremonini as Paola's fiancé
- Aristide Caporale as Bastiano
- Paola Maiolini as Mordacchia's Secretary
- Riccardo Parisio Perrotti as Mordacchia's employee
- Paola D'Egidio as Carla
- Marcello Martana as Bastiano's friend

== Production ==
The film was produced by Alexandra Film. It was shot in Sicily.

== Release ==
The film was released in Italian cinemas starting from 24 March 1977.

== Reception ==
Corriere della Sera film critic Maurizio Porro described the film as a meaningless farce, "lacking both malice and finesse", which "has the strength of a bad revue sketch from the 1950s". Italian film critic Marco Giusti described it as failed and annoying.
