= Prelude and Fugue in C minor, BWV 871 =

Keyboard composition by Johann Sebastian Bach

The Prelude and Fugue in C minor, BWV 871, is a keyboard composition by Johann Sebastian Bach. It is the second prelude and fugue in the second book of The Well-Tempered Clavier, a series of 48 preludes and fugues by the composer. It was composed in 1738.

== Prelude ==
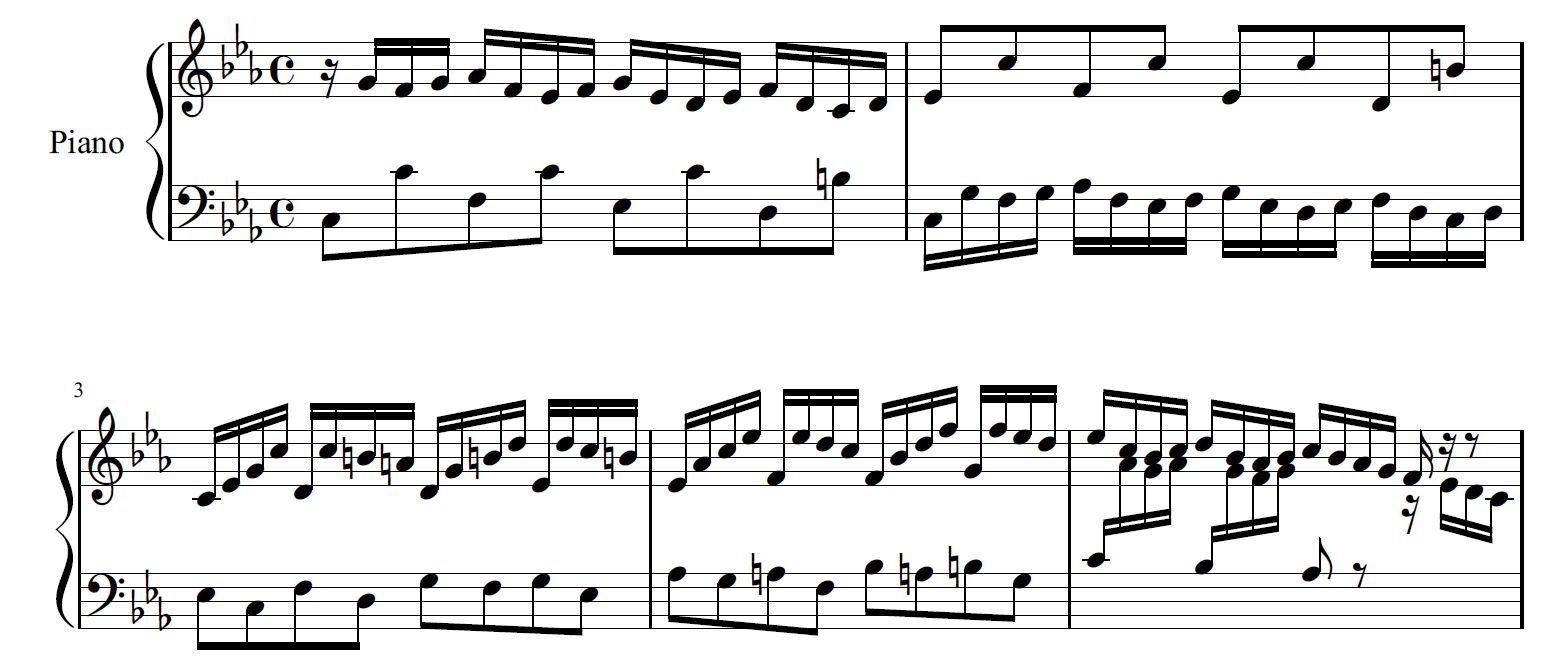
Beginning of the Prelude in C minor, BWV 871.

The prelude, in the key of C minor, has 28 measures and is in the time signature of 4/4. The prelude is not heavily ornamented, but it does contain a few trills. The piece is mainly made up of sixteenth notes and eighth notes and a few quarter notes and half notes.

The melody in the opening bar features prominently in, and is claimed to have inspired, the Italian song La voce del silenzio.

== Fugue ==
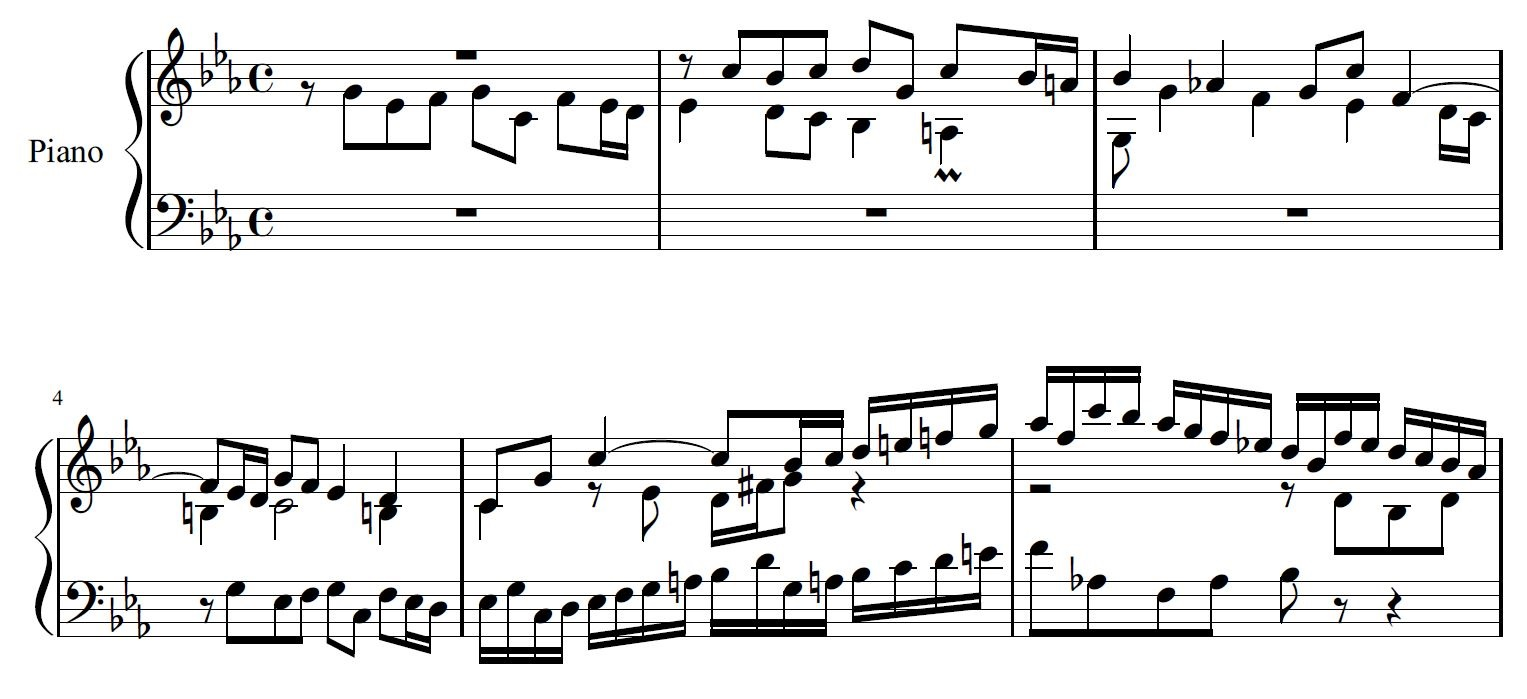
Beginning of the Fugue in C minor, BWV 871.

The fugue, also in the key of C minor, has 28 measures and the time signature is 4/4. It consists of half notes, quarter notes, dotted eighth notes, eighth notes, sixteenth notes, and some 32nd notes. The fugue is not heavily ornamented, and it ends in a Picardy third.
