= The Tiger and the Pussycat =

1967 film by Dino Risi

The Tiger and the Pussycat Il Tigre
- Directed by: Dino Risi
- Written by: Agenore Incrocci; Furio Scarpelli; Dino Risi
- Starring: Vittorio Gassman
- Cinematography: Alessandro D'Eva
- Music by: Fred Bongusto
- Release date: 1967
- Country: Italy
- Language: Italian

Il Tigre, internationally released as The Tiger and the Pussycat, is a 1967 Italian comedy film directed by Dino Risi. For his performance, Vittorio Gassman won the David di Donatello for best actor; the film also won the David di Donatello for best producer.

== Plot ==
In Rome, Francesco Vincenzini is married and has recently become a grandfather. The teenaged son of Francesco tries to kill himself after his affections are rejected by Carolina, a beautiful art student.

Francesco decides to confront the young woman and condemn what she has done. Instead, he is seduced by her. His fling with Carolina makes him feel young again, but he begins to neglect his family and his work.

Invited to run off to Paris with Carolina, Francesco writes a farewell letter to his wife, Esperia, and leaves for the train station. At the last minute, he comes to his senses and decides to return home where Esperia pretends that she did not read his letter.

== Cast ==
- Vittorio Gassman: Francesco Vincenzini
- Ann-Margret: Carolina
- Eleanor Parker: Esperia Vincenzini
- Fiorenzo Fiorentini: Tazio
- Antonella Steni: Pinella
- Luigi Vannucchi: President
- Caterina Boratto: Delia
- Jacques Herlin: Monsignor
- Eleonora Brown: Luisella

== Production ==
It was one of several films Ann-Margret made in Europe around this time.
