= Riki Maiocchi =

Italian singer

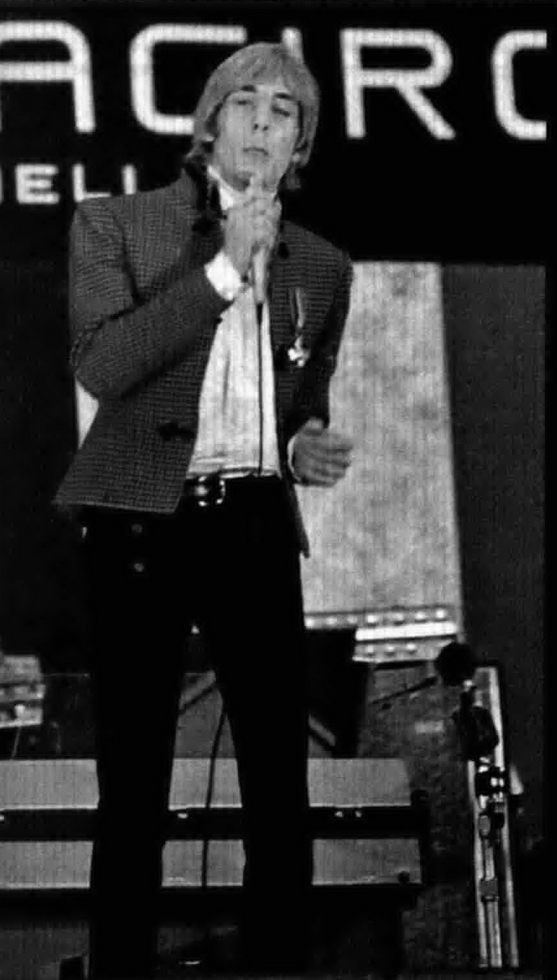
- Riki Maiocchi at the 1967 Cantagiro
- Born: Riccardo Maiocchi; 27 May 1940; Milan, Kingdom of Italy
- Died: 2 February 2004 (aged 63); Milan, Italy
- Occupation: Singer

Riccardo "Riki" Maiocchi (27 May 1940 – 2 February 2004) was an Italian singer and musician, mainly successful in the second half of the 1960s.

== Life and career ==
Born in Milan, Maiocchi started his career as guitarist and singer in a number of local bands. He made his professional debut in 1964, with the single "La tua vera personalità", and in 1965 he entered the group I Camaleonti as lead singer. After getting two major hits, "Sha-La-La" and "Chiedi chiedi", Maiocchi left the band in order to pursue his solo career. The same year, he got an immediate success with the song "Uno in più", written by Mogol and Lucio Battisti, which ranked second on the Italian hit parade.

In 1967 Maiocchi entered the competition at the 17th edition of the Sanremo Music Festival with a second collaboration with Mogol and Battisti, "C'è chi spera", which was also a solid hit, peaking at the eight place on the Italian hit parade. After a third and less successful song by Mogol-Battisti, "Prendi fra le mani la testa", Maiocchi recorded a cover version of the 1940s classic "Ma l'amore no", an attempt to turn himself into a more traditional crooner, but the single failed to chart. In the later years Maiocchi changed three record companies, but his records failed to achieve remarkable results.

After basically stopping his activities in the mid-1970s, Maiocchi partially relaunched his career in the late 1980s and early 1990s thanks to his appearances on several TV programs.

== Discography ==
Albums

- 1988 – Riki Maiocchi – (CGD, LSM 1333)
- 1998 – Uno in più – (MR Music, MRCD 4122)

Singles

- 1964 – La tua vera personalità/Giovedì non mancare – (Columbia, SCMQ 1784)
- 1964 – Non dite a mia madre/P.S. I Love You – (Columbia, SCMQ 1818)
- 1965 – La casa del sole/P.S. I Love You – (Columbia, SCMQ 1818)
- 1965 – Sha la la la la/Tu credi in me – (Kansas, DM 1005)
- 1965 – Quella che cerchi/Mai finirà – (Columbia, SCMQ 1843)
- 1966 – Uno in più/Non buttarmi giù – (CBS, 2388)
- 1967 – C'è chi spera/Sono il tuo poeta – (CBS, 2538)
- 1967 – Prendi fra le mani la testa/Prega – (CBS, 2726)
- 1967 – Ma l'amore no/Un'altra vita – (CBS, 3015)
- 1968 – Il re della solitudine/E volerai – (CBS, 3367)
- 1969 – Io sono qui/Tu vedi mai cerchi bianchi e neri? – (Carosello, CI 20231)
- 1972 – Aiutami/Mary Jane – (CGD, 7981)
- 1976 – Rock 'n' Roll/P.S. I Love You – (Columbia, 3c 006 18154)
