= Don Backy =

Italian singer and actor (born 1939)

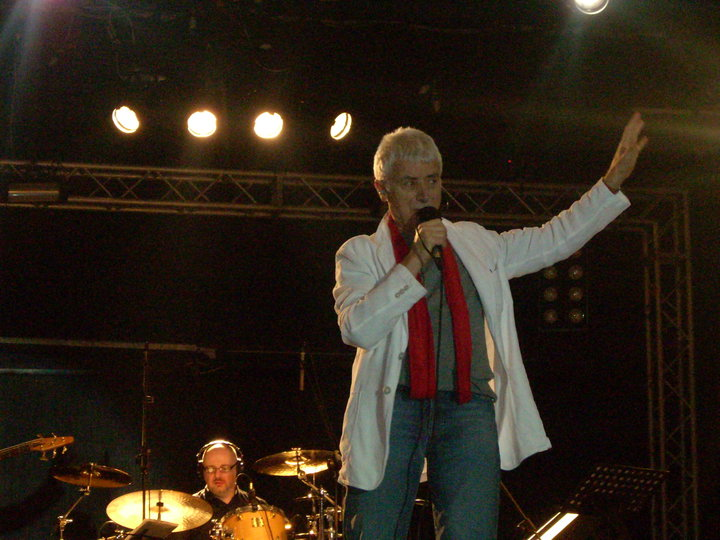

Background information
- Also known as: Aldo Caponi
- Born: 21 August 1939 (age 86); Santa Croce sull'Arno, Tuscany, Kingdom of Italy
- Occupations: Singer, actor
- Years active: 1960–present
- Website: donbacky.it

Aldo Caponi (born 21 August 1939), known professionally as Don Backy, is an Italian singer-songwriter and actor.

== Life and career ==
Born in Santa Croce sull'Arno, Caponi spent his early years in Castellammare di Stabia before returning to his hometown in 1955. In the late 1950s, particularly after watching the film Rock Around the Clock, he became passionate of rock and roll and decided to pursue a musical career, founding the rock band Kiss. After self-producing several singles, mainly consisting of cover versions of American rock songs, in 1961 he started a professional career with the stage name Agaton.

Thanks to the song "La storia di Frankie Ballan", inspired by American folk singers, Caponi attracted the interest of Adriano Celentano's record label Clan Celentano, that put him under contract. Adopted the stage name Don Backy, he soon became a prominent figure in the label, achieving several hits between 1962 and 1967, notably "Amico", "L'amore", "Serenata", "L'immensità" and "Poesia".

In 1968, Don Backy accused and sued Celentano and his label for having allegedly altered the accounting of his record sales; this clash led to Celentano, being his producer, preventing him from taking part in the Sanremo Music Festival with his compositions "Casa bianca" and "Canzone", and to Don Backy leaving the label to found his own record label Amico. In the same period, Don Backy also started a parallel acting career following his breakout in Gianni Puccini's The Seven Cervi Brothers. In 1971, he left Amico to join Compagnia Generale del Disco, with whom he got two major hits, Sanremo Music Festival 1971 entry "Bianchi cristalli sereni" and "Fantasia", and after working for other labels in the late 1970s he founded his label Ciliegia Bianca. In 1976, he composed Mina's hit "Nuda". In 1978, he wrote a musical comedy, Sognando, and in 1981 his song "Importa niente" became opening theme of Domenica in. Starting from the second half of the 1980s, he focused his musical career on concerts and live performances. Starting from the 1990s, he frequently returned to the spotlight thanks to nostalgia-themed events and television programs. His variegated career also include novels, essays, comics, and painting.

== Discography ==
Studio albums

- 1965 - L'amore
- 1968 - Casa bianca
- 1968 - Le quattro stagioni di Don Backy
- 1971 - Fantasia
- 1973 - Io più te
- 1978 - Sognando
- 1979 - Vivendo cantando
- 1981 - Difetti e virtù
- 1981 - Teomedio (Uccello di Rapina)
- 1984 - Spring, Summer, Autunm & Winter
- 1988 - Rock and Roll / Otto belle signore
- 1990 - Finalmente...
- 1992 - Sulla strada
- 1994 - X amore e X rabbia
- 1995 - Carnevalando
- 2003 - Signori si nasce e io lo nacqui
- 2006 - Ieri e oggi
- 2010 - Il mestiere delle canzoni
- 2015 - A noi piacevano gli Everly Brothers
- 2017 - Pianeta donna

== Selected filmography ==
- The Monk of Monza by Sergio Corbucci (1963)
- Super rapina a Milano by Adriano Celentano (1964)
- Bandits in Milan (aka The Violent Four) by Carlo Lizzani (1968)
- The Seven Cervi Brothers by Gianni Puccini (1968)
- The Tough and the Mighty by Carlo Lizzani (1969)
- Satyricon by Gian Luigi Polidoro (1969)
- The Fourth Wall by Adriano Bolzoni (1969)
- Mafia Connection by Camillo Bazzoni (1970)
- Una cavalla tutta nuda by Franco Rossetti (1972)
- When Women Were Called Virgins by Aldo Grimaldi (1972)
- Poppea: A Prostitute in Service of the Emperor by Alfonso Brescia (1972)
- Rabid Dogs by Mario Bava (1974)
- Loves, Beds and Betrayals by Alfonso Brescia (1977)
- Tragedy of a Ridiculous Man by Bernardo Bertolucci (1981)
- Bread and Tulips by Silvio Soldini (2000)
- Impotenti esistenziali by Giuseppe Cirillo (2009)
