= Arrivederci (song) =

Single by Umberto Bindi

from the album Umberto Bindi e le sue canzoni - Vol. 1
- B-side: "Odio"
- Released: 1959
- Genre: Slow rock
- Label: Dischi Ricordi - SRL 10-029
- Songwriters: Umberto Bindi, Giorgio Calabrese

Umberto Bindi singles chronology
| "Arrivederci" (1959) | "Amare te" (1959) |

Audio
- "Arrivederci" on YouTube

"Arrivederci" (Goodbye!) is a 1959 Italian song composed by Umberto Bindi (music) and Giorgio Calabrese (lyrics). "Arrivederci" marked the record debut of Bindi, who recorded two versions of the song, but it was eventually led to success by Don Marino Barreto Jr., whose version topped the Italian hit parade.

The song placed at the second place at the first edition of Canzonissima, in a version performed in duet by Miranda Martino and Nicola Arigliano.

"Arrivederci" was later covered by numerous artists, including Ornella Vanoni, Mina, Caterina Valente, Claudio Villa, Sonia Braga, Ricchi e Poveri, Gianni Morandi, Demis Roussos, Emilio Pericoli, Nilla Pizzi, Bob Azzam, Bruno Martino, Ernesto Bonino, Fred Bongusto, Fausto Papetti, Joe Sentieri, Flo Sandon's, Lara Saint Paul, Orietta Berti, Tony Romano, Morgan, Piergiorgio Farina.

== Track listing ==
7" single – SRL 10-029

1. "Arrivederci" (Umberto Bindi, Giorgio Calabrese)
2. "Odio" (Umberto Bindi, Giorgio Calabrese)

== Charts ==
| Chart | Peak position |
|---|---|
| Italy | 1 |
