= Tony Del Monaco =

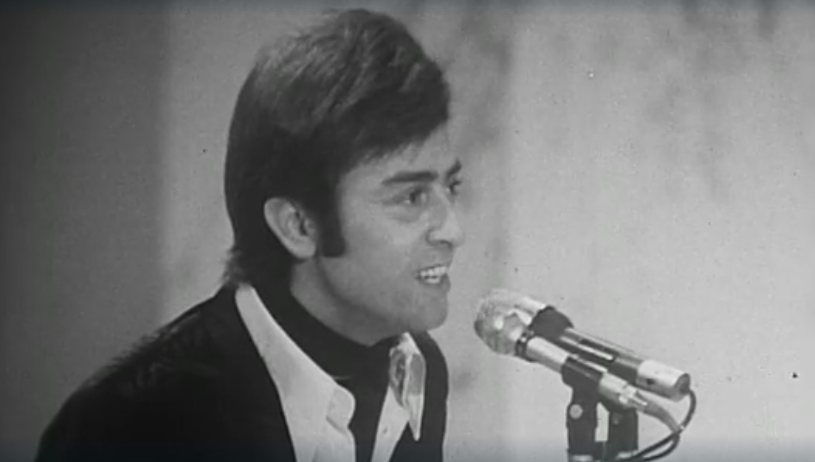
- Tony Del Monaco, Sanremo Music Festival 1970

Background information
- Born: Antonio Del Monaco; 27 December 1935; Sulmona, Abruzzi e Molise, Kingdom of Italy
- Died: 27 May 1993 (aged 57) Ancona, Marche, Italy
- Genres: Pop
- Occupations: Singer, songwriter, actor
- Years active: 1962–1993
- Labels: RCA Camden, RCA Italiana, CGD, Ricordi, Fonit Cetra

Antonio "Tony" Del Monaco (27 December 1935 – 27 May 1993) was an Italian pop singer, and actor.

== Biography ==
Del Monaco was born in the city of Sulmona in Abruzzo. He started in show business as an actor, appearing in the 1961 musical comedy L'adorabile Giulio (The adorable Julio), starring Carlo Dapporto and Delia Scala. In 1965, he performed on the TV show Campioni a Campione (Champions at Campione) the song "Vita Mia" ("My life"), which he'd composed and which entered the Italian pop charts.

In 1959, he debuted at the Vibo Valentia song festival, ranking 3rd with the song "Al ciel manca un angelo" ("The heaven is missing an angel"). In 1967, he participated in the Sanremo Festival with "È più forte di me" ("It's stronger than me"), paired with Betty Curtis, and released "Una spina e una rosa" ("A thorn and a rose") the same year. Del Monaco competed in Sanremo again in 1968, paired with Dionne Warwick, with the song "La voce del silenzio " ("The voice of silence"); in 1969, with "Un'ora fa" ("An hour ago") paired with Fausto Leali; and in 1970, with the Claudio Villa song "Serenata".

In the 1960s and 1970s, Del Monaco composed many songs that were covered by star singers of that era, such as "L'ultima occasione" (as "Once There Was A Time") by Mina and Tom Jones.

He died on 27 May 1993, from an "incurable disease", in a clinic in Ancona.

== Selected discography ==
=== 45s ===
- 1961 – "Silver blue" / "Silver blue" (instrumental) (RCA Italiana PM 0136)
- 1965 – "Vita mia" / "Quando si alza la luna" (CGD N-9601)
- 1966 – "Se la vita è così" / "Con l'aiuto del tuo amore" (CGD N-9619)
- 1967 – "È più forte di me" / "Con un po' di volontà" (CGD N-9650)
- 1967 – "Tu che sei l'amore" / "Per vivere" (CGD N-9659)
- 1967 – "Parla tu cuore mio" / "L'uomo che vuoi tu" (CGD N-9665)
- 1968 – "La voce del silenzio" / "Una piccola candela" (CGD N-9675)
- 1968 – "Magia" / "È diventato amore" (CGD N-9687)
- 1968 – "Vola vola" / "Se c'è un peccato" (Ricordi N-10508)
- 1969 – "Un'ora fa" / "Se c'è un peccato" (Ricordi SRL-10532)
- 1969 – "Una spina e una rosa" / "Peccato" (Ricordi SRL-10542)
- 1970 – "Serenata" / "Per te, per te, per te" (Ricordi SRL-10581)
- 1970 – "Cuore di bambola" / "Io non-ci penso più" (Ricordi SRL-10603)
- 1974 – "Vivere insieme" / "Il viaggio" (Fonit Cetra SP 1558)
- 1975 – "Siamo stati innamorati" / "Negli occhi nel cuore nell'anima" (Fonit Cetra SP 1585)
- 1978 – "Te ne vai" / "Come un poeta d'osteria" (Idea ID NP 701)

=== LPs ===
- 1966 – Tony Del Monaco (CGD FG 5030)
