= Umberto Bindi =

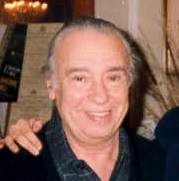
- Umberto Bindi

Background information
- Born: Umberto Bindi; 12 May 1932; Bogliasco, Kingdom of Italy
- Died: 23 May 2002 (aged 70) Rome, Italy
- Genres: Pop
- Occupations: Singer-songwriter, artist
- Instruments: Vocals, piano
- Years active: 1956–2002
- Labels: RCA Italiana, Durium (Italy),
- Formerly of: Gino Paoli

Umberto Bindi (12 May 1932 – 23 May 2002) was an Italian singer-songwriter. He is especially known for the popular song he co-wrote with Gino Paoli, Il Mio Mondo ("You're My World"), which he recorded in Italian in 1963, and ''La musica è finita'' ("Our Song", recorded by Robert Plant on 45 rpm and then on album Sixty Six to Timbuktu). It was later performed by singers in English and other languages.

== Life and career ==
Bindi was born in Bogliasco (Province of Genoa), Italy, and was classically trained. He wrote his first song, "T'ho perduto" ("I've Lost You"), in 1950. He made his professional debut in Italian popular music in 1959 with his composition, "Arrivederci". The song was recorded by Don Marino Barreto Jr., and soon became the best-selling single in Italy for that year. A cover version was recorded by Chet Baker in 1960 for the Italian film, Urlatori alla sbarra.

Bindi's first album, Umberto Bindi e le sue canzoni, was released in 1960. Bindi also wrote and recorded a number of songs that would make him known to the larger public in Italy. A few of these became classic hits there, covered many times: besides "Arrivederci", Il Nostro Concerto ("Our Concert"), 1960, number 2 on Italy's best-selling singles list for the year, "Riviera" (1961), and "Il Mio Mondo". The latter was recorded in English in 1964 by the British pop singer Cilla Black, and remained number 1 on the UK Singles Chart for four weeks, while also reaching Number 1 in Australia, Number 2 in Ireland and New Zealand and Number 26 in the USA. Bindi's "Il Nostro Concerto" spent one week in the UK Singles Chart in November 1960, at number 47.

He also wrote the music of La musica è finita (1967), another Italian classic, made famous by Ornella Vanoni and Mina.

However, his singing career in Italy stalled, and he and music critics attributed this to the Italian media's discomfort in the 1960s with Bindi's homosexuality. The singer nevertheless made a few concert appearances.

Bindi died at a Rome hospital from heart disease at the age of 70.

== Discography ==
=== Albums ===
- Umberto Bindi e le sue canzoni (1960)
- Umberto Bindi (1961)
- Con il passare del tempo (1972)
- Io e il mare (1976)
- D'ora in poi (1982; re-issued as Le voci della sera in 1996)
- Bindi (1985)
- Di coraggio non-si muore (1996)

=== Singles ===
- "Arrivederci" / "Odio" (Ricordi) (1959)
- "Amare te/Nuvola per due" (Ricordi) (1959)
- "Girotondo per i grandi" / "Basta una volta" (Ricordi) (1959)
- "Tu" / "Non so" (Ricordi) (1959)
- "Un giorno, un mese, un anno" / "Lasciatemi sognare" (Ricordi) (1960)
- "Appuntamento a Madrid" / "Il confine" (Ricordi) (1960)
- "È vero" / "Luna nuova sul Fuji-Yama" (Ricordi) (1960)
- "Il nostro concerto" / "Un giorno, un mese, un anno" (Ricordi) (1960)
- "Se ci sei" / "Chiedimi l'impossibile" (Ricordi) (1960)
- "Un paradiso da vendere" / "Marie Claire" (Ricordi) (1960)
- "Non mi dire chi sei" / "Amare te" (Ricordi) (1961)
- "Riviera" / "Vento di mare" (Ricordi) (1961)
- "Noi due" / "Appuntamento a Madrid" (Ricordi) (1961)
- "Ninna nanna" / "Girotondo per i grandi" (Ricordi) (1961)
- "Jane" / "Carnevale a Rio" (Ricordi) (1962)
- "Un ricordo d'amore" / "Vacanze" (RCA) (1962)
- "Il mio mondo" / "Vieni, andiamo" (RCA) (1963)
- "Ave Maria" / "Un uomo che ti ama" (RCA) (1964)
- "Quello che c'èra un giorno" / "Il giorno della verità" (RCA) (1964)
- "Per vivere" / "Storia al mare" (Ariston) (1968)
- "Mare" / "Ma perché" (Variety) (1969)
- "Io e il mare" / "Flash" (Durium) (1976)
- "L'alba" / "Bogliasco notturno" (Durium) (1976)
- "Letti (con i New Trolls)" / "Chiara" / "Miracolo miracolo" (solo New Trolls) (Fonopoli Stage) (1976)
