= Gianni Pettenati =

Italian singer (1945–2025)

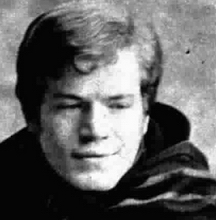
- Pettenati in 1970
- Born: 29 October 1945; Piacenza, Kingdom of Italy
- Died: 22 February 2025 (aged 79); Albenga, Italy
- Occupations: Singer, musical critic

Gianni Pettenati (29 October 1945 – 22 February 2025) was an Italian singer and musical critic. He is most famous for his Italian cover versions of great international hits. He was also the author of plays and books on the history of Italian music.

== Life and career ==
Gianni Pettenati started very early, winning a music contest when he was 8 years old and acted in a play by Pirandello. In April 1965 he won the Festival di Bellaria, then joined a group called the Juniors in 1966 to record "Come una pietra che rotola", a cover version of "Like a Rolling Stone" originally by Bob Dylan. This was followed by "Il superuomo" again with the Juniors, this time a cover of "Sunshine Superman" by Donovan, with the B-side being "Puoi farmi piangere", a cover of "I Put a Spell on You" by Screamin' Jay Hawkins.

His greatest success came in 1966 with "Bandiera gialla", the Italian version of "The Pied Piper". In 1967, he participated in the Sanremo Music Festival with "La rivoluzione" and again in 1968 with "La tramontana".

Pettenati continued to sing a repertoire mostly consisting of his earlier hits in the 1960s. He was on stage in the musical Quei bravi ragazzi, with a history of Italian song told from memory. With Pettenati as storyteller, there were five artists accompanying him: Delia Rimoldi (actress and singer), Raffaele Koheler (trumpet player of the Banda Osiris and Ottavo Ricther), Maurizio Dosi (actor and accordion player) and Luca Maciachini (vocals and guitar).

Gianni Pettenati was also a musical critic, author of novels, plays and many books on the history of Italian music. His published works include:

- Quelli eran giorni - 30 anni di canzoni italiane, co-authored with Red Ronnie (Edizioni Ricordi)
- Gli anni '60 in America (Edizioni Virgilio)
- Mina come sono (Edizioni Virgilio)
- Io Renato Zero (Edizioni Virgilio)
- Alice se ne va (Edizioni Asefi)

Pettenati died on 22 February 2025, at the age of 79.

== Discography ==
=== Albums ===
- 1968: Gianni Pettenati 1
- 1973: Par la mort dun sunadur
- 1984: Bandiera Azzurra

=== Singles ===
- 1966: "Come una pietra che rotola"/"Siamo alla fine" (Gianni Pettenati & The Juniors)
- 1966: "Bandiera gialla"/"Se mi vuoi così"
- 1967: "Il superuomo"/"Puoi farmi piangere" (Gianni Pettenati & The Juniors)
- 1967: "La rivoluzione"/"Ciao ragazza, ciao"
- 1967: "Io credo in te"/"Lo sbaglio di volere te"
- 1967: "Un cavallo nella testa"/"Vai vai"
- 1968: "La tramontana"/"Voglio tornare a casa mia"
- 1968: "Cara judy ciao (Judy in disguise)"/"Tango"
- 1969: "Les Byciclettes de Belsize"/"Lingering on"
- 1969: "Caldo caldo"/"... e mi svegliavo (col cuore in gola)"
- 1970: "In mezzo al traffico"/"La musica continua"(with the Tombstones)
- 1970: "Candida/É già tardi ormai" (with the Tombstones)
- 1983: "Bandiera gialla"/"Bandiera gialla (instrumental)
- 1984: "Bandiera azzurra"/"Cade la neve"
- 1986: "Come sarà domani"/"Ho perso te"
- 1989: "Tutto è successo all'improvviso"/"Una canzone per non morire"

Released outside Italy

- 1968: "La tramontana"/"La balada de Bonnie and Clyde" (released in Spain)
- 1968: "La tramontana"/"Quiero volver a casa" (released in Argentina)
- 1968: "La tramontana"/"Voglio tornare a casa mia" (released in Brazil)
- 1969: "In mezzo al traffico"/"La musica continua" (released in Spain)

=== CDs ===
- 1995: Che cosa fanno gli angeli

== Filmography ==
- 1967: I ragazzi di Bandiera Gialla
