= Little Tony (singer) =

Sammarinese singer and actor (1941–2013)

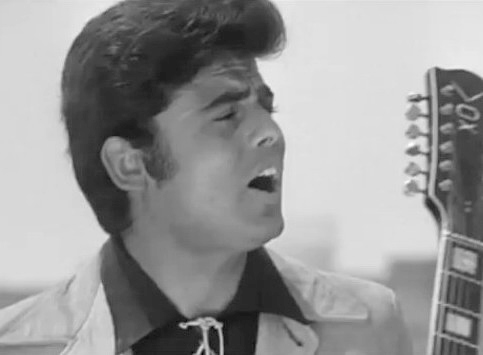
- Little Tony in an image from the movie Cuore matto... matto da legare (1967)

Background information
- Born: 9 February 1941; Tivoli, Lazio, Kingdom of Italy
- Died: 27 May 2013 (aged 72) Rome, Lazio, Italy
- Genre: Rock and roll
- Occupations: Singer; actor
- Years active: 1957–2013

Antonio Ciacci (9 February 1941 – 27 May 2013), better known as Little Tony, was an Italian-born Sammarinese singer and actor, who achieved success in Britain in the late 1950s and early 1960s, as the lead singer of Little Tony & His Brothers, before returning to Italy where he continued a successful career as a singer and film actor.

== Life and career ==
Little Tony was born in Tivoli, Lazio, Italy, but was a citizen of San Marino, where his parents were from, and never applied for Italian citizenship. He formed a rock and roll group with his two brothers, Alberto and Enrico, in 1957, naming himself Little Tony in emulation of Little Richard. The following year, the group were signed by Durium Records, who released a series of covers of American rock and roll songs by them in Italy.

In 1959, the Italian singer Marino Marini, when in London, recommended the group to TV pop show producer Jack Good. Good visited Italy to meet the group, was impressed, and signed them up to appear in his British TV show Boy Meets Girls. They made their first appearance on the programme in September 1959, and released their first single in the UK, "I Can't Help It" – the 11th single of their career in Italy – on the Decca label soon afterwards. For their third British single, Good recorded the group in London for the first time; the resulting single, "Too Good", (written by Doc Pomus and Mort Shuman, (Decca 45-F11190), released in '59, reached # 19 on the UK singles chart in January 1960. It was their only chart success in Britain. The group continued to appear regularly on TV shows in Britain until 1962.

The group first revisited Italy in 1961 to appear at the Sanremo Festival when they performed the song "24.000 baci" with Adriano Celentano and finished second, returning more permanently the following year. Little Tony then worked as a solo singer, having his first #1 in Italy with "Il ragazzo col ciuffo" in 1962. He began working as a movie actor, appearing in over 20 movies in Italy, and becoming a star in the musicarelli film genre.

He also continued to record regularly through the 1960s, one of his biggest hits from the Sanremo Music Festival 1967 is "Cuore matto" ("Crazy Heart"), no. 1 for nine consecutive weeks in 1967. It sold in excess of about six million copies and was awarded a gold disc in May 1967. Another successful song was "Quando vedrai la mia ragazza", which he performed at the 1964 Sanremo Festival, which sold almost one million copies, and later "Riderà", which sold over a million copies in 1966. He formed his own record label, Little Records, in 1969.

At the Sanremo Music Festival 1969, Little Tony was singing the swing hit "Bada Bambina" ("Be Careful Baby"), and in the following edition he participated with the hit "La spada nel cuore" ("The Sword in My Heart"), which became an international hit. In 1975, he recorded the album Tony canta Elvis, which paid tribute to Elvis Presley.

In the 1980s, the three singers Rosanna Fratello, Bobby Solo and Little Tony formed the supergroup "Ro Bo T". In the late 1980s, Little Tony was in America and recorded several songs with Diana Ross and the Supremes. In the 1990s and 2000s, Little Tony participated in dozens of TV shows, particularly on Rai Uno and Canale 5, among others with the Italians Gianni Morandi, Rita Pavone, Adriano Celentano, Mara Venier and many others. He continued to record and perform successfully in Italy, despite suffering a heart attack during his show in Canada in 2006.

In 2008, Little Tony participated in the Sanremo Festival for the tenth time, with the song "Non finisce qui" ("It Doesn't End Here"). He also recorded a CD in that year with some other hits, such as "Figli di Pitagora".

Little Tony died of lung cancer on 27 May 2013, in Rome, at the age of 72, and was buried in his native Tivoli.
