= Don Marino Barreto Jr. =

Italian singer (1925–1971)

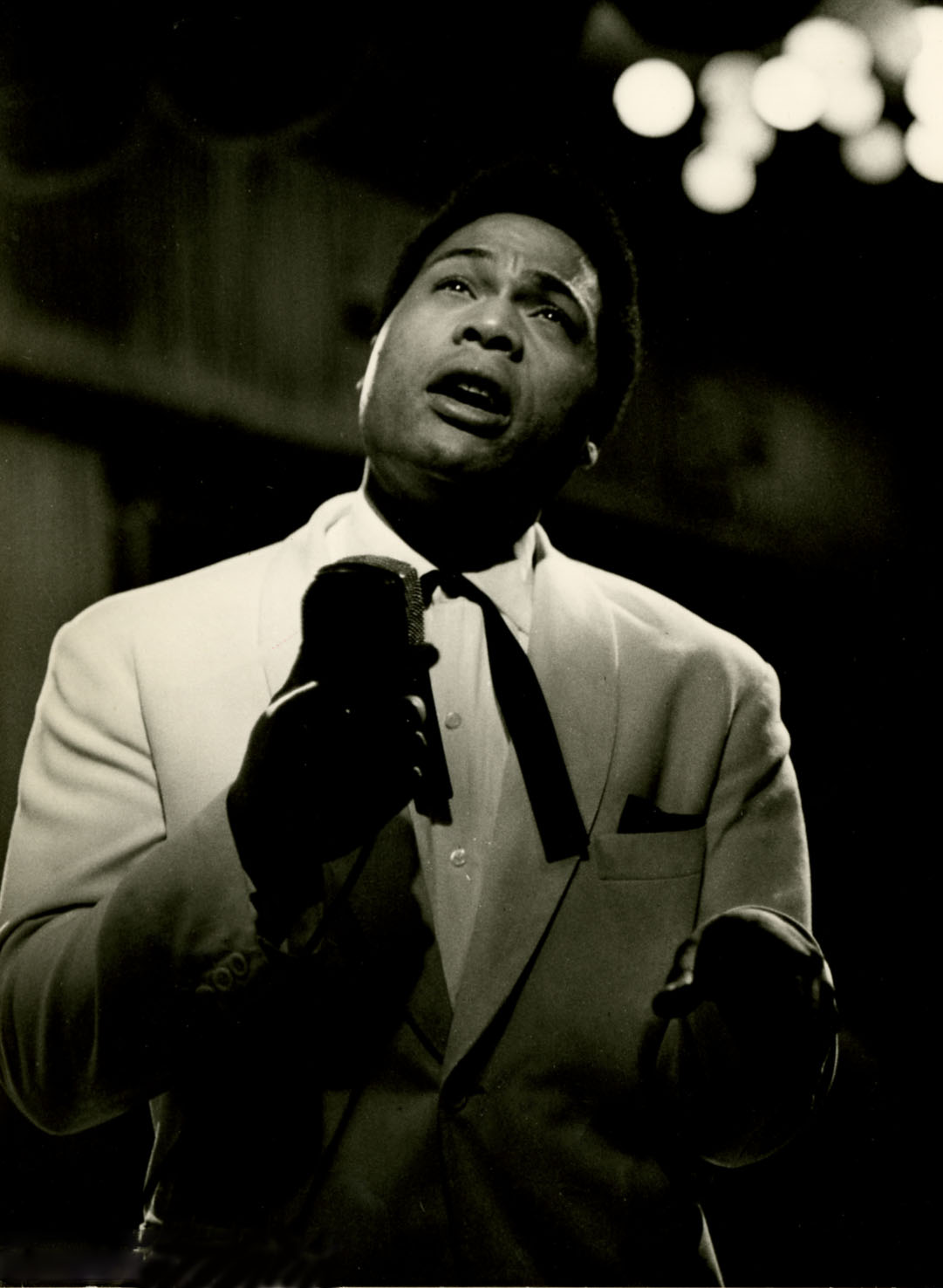
- Born: 8 December 1925; Matanzas, Cuba
- Died: 10 December 1971 (aged 46); Milan, Italy
- Occupation: Singer

Don Marino Barreto Jr. (8 December 1925 – 10 December 1971) was a Cuban-Italian pop singer and musician.

== Career ==
Born Marino Barreto y Rubio in Matanzas, Barreto moved to Italy in 1949, beginning his career as a contrabassist. His main success was the song "Arrivederci", which peaked the Italian hit parade in 1959 and won a Gold Record. Other Top 5 hits include the songs "Telefonami", "Visino d'angelo", "È vero", "Non lasciarmi". His success declined in the early 1960s, nonetheless Barreto continued his activity performing live until his death for cirrhosis on 8 December 1971 in Milan, two days after his 46th birthday.

He is sometimes confused with his half-brother, Don Marino Barreto (1907–1995), who had a singing career in Britain.

== Discography ==
=== Album ===
- 1955 - Cubana (VOX, VX 820)
- 1956 - Don Marino Barreto e la sua orchestra cubana (VOX, VIT 1500)
- 1956 - Te lo digo cantando (Philips, P 10654 R)
- 1957 - Lisboa antigua (Philips, 10660 R)
- 1959 - Sogni di fumo (Philips, P 10666 R)
- 1959 - Angeli negri (Philips, P 08505 L)
- 1960 - Marino Barreto Junior e il suo complesso (Philips, P 08512 L)
- 1960 - Altagracia (Philips, P 08517 L)
- 1960 - Una sera al night con don Marino Barreto Jr. (Philips, E 440 203 RT)
- ???? - Marino Barreto Jr. (Philips, 635 000/001 QRL, Cofanetto 2LP)
- 1973 - 1. Arrivederci (Fontana Special, 6492 013)
- 1973 - 2. La più bella del mondo (Fontana Special, 6492 014)
- 1974 - 3. Marino Barreto Jr. e il suo complesso (Fontana Special, 6492 025)
- 1975 - Le più belle canzoni di Marino Barreto (Fontana Special, 6492 038)
- 1981 - Marino Barreto - Fred Buscaglione (K-Tel, SKI 5057)

=== EP ===
- 1955 - Holiday in Cuba (come Don Marino Barreto jr. e la sua Orchestra Cubana) (VOX, VIP 30-110)
- 1955 - Cha cha cha (come Don Marino Barreto jr. e la sua Orchestra Cubana)
- 1955 - Cha cha cha (come Don Marino Barreto jr. e la sua Orchestra Cubana)
- 1956 - A voz de morro / Una notte ancora / Te lo digo cantando / Paraiba (Philips, 421 812 PE)
- 1956 - Adeus, adeus Morena / Una aventura mas / La più bella del mondo / Saudosa Maioca (Philips, 421 813 PE)
- 1956 - O voz do morro / La più bella del mondo / Paraiba / dimmi ancora "I love you" (Philips, 421 816 PE)
- 1957 - Nuvola per due / Non so / Felicità / Vorrei baciarti (Philips, 421 829 PE)
- 1957 - Lisboa antigua / As mariposas / Nicolasa / Visino d'angelo (Philips 421 833 PE)
- 1957 - Napulitano do Brazil / De corazon a corazon / Stupidella / Conselho de muhler (Philips, 421 834 PE)
- 1957 - O sambo de Ernesto / Mi tajo / Too close for confort / Con tigo en la distancia (Philips, 421 835 PE)
- 1957 - Banana boat / Come prima / Las muchachas / T'ho donato il cuore (Philips, 421 841 PE)
- 1958 - Juana / Con te / Napolitan calypso / Tutti recitiamo (Philips, pe 421 859 PE)
- 1958 - Favole / T'ho perduta Fischiettando nella notte / Don Marino rock'n'roll [colonna sonora dal film "Tre straniere a Roma"] (Philips, 421 868 PE)
- 1958 - Nel blu dipinto di blu / No te perdono / Hasta la vista...Senora! / Nun trovo pace (Philips, 421 874 PE)
- 1959 - Mambo en Espana (come Don Marino Barreto jr. y su Orchestra Cubana)
- 1959 - Come prima / Besame asì / Nel blu dipinto di blu / Lontano
- 1959 - Anima mia / Espasimo / Tomcat mambo / Non illuderti (Philips, 421 892 PE)
- 1959 - Canzoni dal film "Il terribile Teodoro" (con Lina Lancia) (Philips, 421 895 PE)
- 1959 - Arrivederci / Mustapha / Good bye / Angeli negri (Philips, DC 330.011)
- 1959 - Per un bacio d'amor / Ho paura d'innamorarmi / Maria / Hasta la vista... senora (Philips, 431 006 PE)
- 1959 - Arrivederci / Mia caera Venezia / Per un bacio d'amor / Angeli negri (Philips, 431 013 PE)
- 1959 - Nuvola per due / Non so / Felicità / Vorrei baciarti (Philips, 431 026 PE)
- 1960 - Il tuo destino / Simonè / Good-bye / È vero (Philips, 431 039 PE)
- 1960 - Non lasciarmi / Bruciame 'a vocca / Non cercatemi / Meu brazil (Philips, 431 040 PE)
- 1960 - Suavecito / Era tan linda / Abreme la puerta / Pao Pao (Philips, 431 045 PE)

=== Singles ===
==== 78 rpm ====
- 1955 - Nunca / Esta noite sereno (Philips, P 63071 H)
- 1955 - Octaviano / Una notte ancora (Philips, P 63072 H)
- 1956 - Non illuderti / Rico caliente y sabroso (Philips, P 63073 H)
- 1956 - Una aventura mas / Lontano (Philips, P 63116 H)
- 1956 - Dimmi "I love you" / Sogni di fumo (Philips, P 63117 H)
- 1956 - Darling, je vous aime / Saudosa maloca (Philips, P 63142 H)
- 1956 - Espasimo / O sambo de Ernesto (Philips, P 63145 H)
- 1956 - Bonita / La più bella del mondo (Philips, P 63168 H)
- 1956 - Paraiba / Oro in Italia (Philips, P 63169)
- 1956 - Che male c'è / A voz do morro (Philips, P 63171 H)
- 1956 - Bruciame 'a vocca / Carinoso (Philips, P 63224 H)
- 1956 - Lisboa antigua / Zambesi (Philips, P 63271 H)
- 1956 - Conselho de mulher / De corazon a corazon (Philips, P 63273 H)
- 1956 - Mi tajo / Ma baciami (Philips, P 63274 H)
- 1957 - Stupidella / Visino d'angelo (Philips, P 63275 H)
- 1958 - Banana boat / T'ho donato il cuore (Philips, P 63301 H)
- 1958 - Come prima / Las muchachas (Philips, P 63306 H)
- 1959 - Ho rubato / Ave Maria no morro (Philips, 63319 H)

==== 45 rpm ====
- 1957 - Octaviano / Una notte ancora (Philips, 363 072 PF)
- 1957 - Una aventura mas / Lontano (Philips, 363 116 PF)
- 1957 - Te lo digo cantando / Nicolasa (Philips, 363 143 PF)
- 1957 - Espasimo / O sambo do Ernesto (Philips, 363 145 PF)
- 1957 - Bonita / La più bella del mondo (Philips, 363 168 PF)
- 1957 - Paraiba / A voz do morro (Philips, 363 202 PF)
- 1957 - Carinoso / Bruciame 'a vocca (Philips, 363 224 PF)
- 1958 - Mi tajo / Ma baciami (Philips, 363 274 PF)
- 1958 - Stupidella / Visino d'angelo (Philips, 363 275 PF)
- 1958 - Banana boat / T'ho donato il cuore (Philips, 363 301 PF)
- 1958 - Come prima / Las muchachas (Philips, 363 306 PF)
- 1958 - Tu / Pare cochero (Philips, 363 316 PF)
- 1958 - Napolitan calypso / Juana (Philips, 363 317 PF)
- 1958 - Ho rubato / Ave Maria no morro (Philips, 363 319 PF)
- 1958 - Songo 'nnammurato / Ogni giorno (Philips, 363 322 PF)
- 1958 - Nel blu dipinto di blu / Lontan da me (Philips, 363 323 PF)
- 1958 - Hasta la vista... senora / Maria (Philips, 363 324 PF)
- 1959 - Per un bacio d'amor / Buenas noches mi amor (Philips, 363 327 PF)
- 1959 - Sempre più vicini / Pecché nun saccio di' (Philips, 363 328 PF)
- 1959 - Tomcat mambo / Ho paura d'innamorarmi (Philips, 363 331 PF)
- 1959 - Vurria / Anima mia (Philips, 363 344 PF)
- 1959 - Pobre corazon / Amo la notte (Philips, 363 345 PF)
- 1959 - Hai rifiutato le mie rose / El reloy (Philips, 363 346 PF)
- 1959 - Non sei bellissima / Me que mei (Philips, 363 347 PF)
- 1959 - M'addormento con te / Xamego (Philips, 363 348 PF)
- 1959 - Come prima / Besame asi ( Philips, 363 356 PF)
- 1959 - Arrivederci / Angeli negri (Philips, 363 387 PF)
- 1959 - Non so / Nuvola per due (Philips, 363 388 PF)
- 1959 - Piangi / Morreu o meu primeiro amor (Philips, 363 411 PF)
- 1959 - E' bom parar / Vorrei baciarti (Philips, 363 412 PF)
- 1959 - La barca / El devorcio (Philips, 363 413 PF)
- 1959 - Favole / Angeli negri (Philips, 363 414 PF)
- 1959 - Felicità / La canzone di Orfeo (Philips, 363 430 PF)
- 1959 - Nel ballare / No se va a poder (Philips, 363 431 PF)
- 1959 - Non cercatemi / Sei tutta un pericolo (Philips, 363 432 PF)
- 1959 - Un dolcissimo bacio / Good-bye (Philips, 363 434 PF)
- 1959 - Simonè / Tramonto sul mare (Philips, 363 435 PF)
- 1959 - Il tuo destino / Meu Brazil (Philips, 363 436 PF)
- 1959 - Cibao adentro / È solo carità (Philips, 363 438 PF)
- 1959 - Come una bambola/Hei! Taxi ( Philips, 363 439 PF)
- 1959 - Occhi di cielo / Non lasciarmi (Philips, 363 440 PF)
- 1959 - Brasilian sax / Favole (Philips, 363 441 PF)
- 1959 - Per un bacio d'amor (The Red Record-Il Musichiere, 20018, Flexi)
- 1959 - Nicolasa (Buscaglione Caffè, RiFi Record, 10017, Flexi)
- 1959 - Banana boat (NET, RiFi Record, 10018, Flexi)
- 1959 - Banana boat (Grey, 18818, Flexi)
- 1958 - Nicolasa / Banana boat (Grey, RiFi Record, 10021, Flexi)
- 1960 - Teresa pela le patate / Calypso Chua (The Red Record, 10014)
- 1960 - El Guapacha / El Mamboleo (The Red Record, 10017)
- 1960 - Tango cubano / Guajeo en cha cha cha (The Red Record, 10065)
- 1960 - Rapsodia flamenco cubana / Mamadù (The Red Record, 10081)
- 1960 - El guaguanco / Marino's samba (The Red Record, 10082)
- 1960 - È vero / Noi (Philips, 363 463 PF)
- 1960 - Consuelo / T'ho donato il cuore (Philips, 363 484 PF)
- 1960 - Cantando nel buio / Altagracia (Philips, 363 493 PF)
- 1960 - Ammore / T'ascolto (Philips, 363 496 PF)
- 1960 - Tè, chocolate o cafè / Uè, uè, che femmena! (Philips, 363 503 PF)
- 1960 - Il nostro concerto / Che bella cosa sei (Philips, 363 505 PF)
- 1960 - Telefonami / Fantastico (Philips, 363 513 PF)
- 1960 - Il tuo destino / Meu Brazil (Philips, 363 536 PF)
- 1961 - Hai rifiutato le mie rose / Era tan linda (Philips, 363 532 PF)
- 1961 - Sei proibita per me / Luna di lana (Philips, 363 542 PF)
- 1961 - Due anelli / Sensacional (Philips, 363 544 PF)
- 1961 - Insonnia / Cinque minuti ancora (Philips, 363 545 PF)
- 1961 - È semplice / Cha cha cha Tchaikowsky (Philips, 363 546 PF)
- 1961 - Un'anima tra le mani / Salta chi può (Philips, 363 547 PF)
- 1961 - Telefonami / Tu sei fatta di nebbia (Philips, 363 552 PF)
- 1961 - Sivori cha cha cha / Merengue bianconero (Philips, 363 553 PF)
- 1961 - Voltati / I cerchi sull'acqua (Philips, 363 562 PF)
- 1961 - L'eredità di un vecchio pittore / E la vita continua (Philips, 363 563 PF)
- 1961 - La novia / Regalami una notte (Philips, 363 567 PF)
- 1962 - Telefonami / Cantando nel buio (Philips, 363 575 PF)
- 1962 - Balliamo il twist / Credo d'amore (Philips, 363 576 PF)
- 1963 - Fino all'alba / Dormi breve (Philips, 363 605 PF)
- 1963 - Forse è solo un sogno / Con te nell'eternità (Philips, 363 617 PF)
- 1963 - Ho sbagliato con te / Morena bocca d'oro (Philips, 363 625 PF)
- 1963 - Quando mi chiederanno di te / Non dirmi arrivederci (Philips, 363 633 PF)
- 1963 - Frida / Maria Ninguem (Philips, 363 636 PF)
- 1964 - La mamma / Chi non lo sa (Ariston, AR 013)
- 1965 - Dammi tempo / Qualcuno ha parlato (Ariston, AR 036)
- 1968 - Arrivederci / Angeli negri (Philips, 363 387 PF, Serie Best Sellers)
- 1969 - La strada che non c'è / Signora illusione (Philips, 363 746 PF)
- 1969 - Non lasciarmi / Luna di lana (Philips, 363 955 PF)
- 1970 - Darlà dirladadà / Non so (Philips, 6025 021)
