= Our Song (Jack Jones song) =

1967 single by Jack Jones

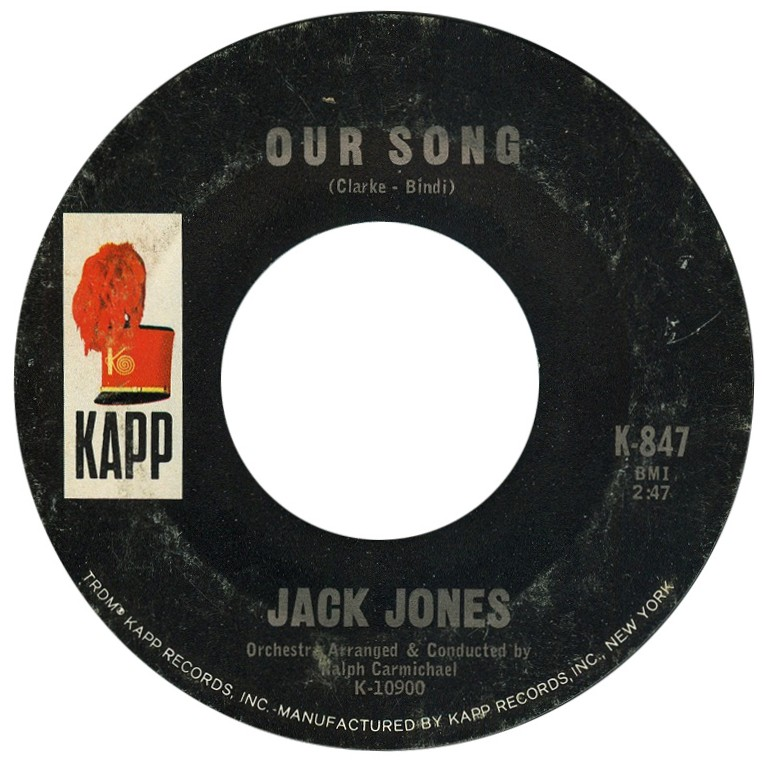
- A-side of the single

Single by Jack Jones

from the album Our Song
- B-side: "Michelle"
- Released: August 1967
- Recorded: Summer 1967
- Genre: Pop; Easy listening
- Length: 2:47
- Label: Kapp; K-847
- Songwriters: Umberto Bindi; Franco Califano; Nicola Salerno; Anthony Ralph Clarke
- Producer: Michael Kapp

Jack Jones singles chronology
"Now I Know" (1967)	"Our Song" (1967)	"Open for Business as Usual" (1967)

Professional ratings
Review scores
Source	Rating
Record World	4/5 stars
Billboard	Positive (Spotlight)
Cashbox	Positive (Pick of the Week)

"Our Song" is the English version of an Italian song called "La Musica è Finita" written by Umberto Bindi and Franco Califano. English lyrics were written by Nisa and Anthony Ralph Clarke, and most notably performed by American singer Jack Jones, who released the song as a single in August 1967. Another version was recorded shortly after by ex-Led Zeppelin singer Robert Plant, and included on his compilation album Sixty Six to Timbuktu.

== Jack Jones version ==
=== Background ===
By 1967, Jones' chart performance was still strong, and the main chart he had success with was the Easy Listening chart. The new single followed "Now I Know", which reached No. 3 on the charts. "Our Song" was the fourth of seven singles that he released that year. It was produced by Michael and arranged by Ralph Carmichael, as on his previous single. It was featured as the title track on his album released the following month, Our Song. Notably, it was one of his final recordings for Kapp Records, as he would soon switch labels to RCA Victor, although Kapp would reissue some of Jones' material later as well.

=== Release and reception ===
"Our Song" was released as a seven-inch single in August 1967 by RCA Victor Records. The track was recorded as a ballad. It was backed by a popular Beatles song written by Paul McCartney, simply titled "Michelle" on the B-side, which would be included on the same LP as "Our Song".

The single received a positive critical reception. Record World put the single in its "Four Stars" singles section, believing that "Jack opens up and lets go on this torch that hits market interests right on target." Cashbox said that "Coin ops will show up in force, as will fans of the balladeer. Excellent reading of a wonderfully constructed tune." They also noted that Jones did a "Pretty rendering of the Beatle-penned ballad for the flip." Billboard magazine reviewed the single on August 12, 1967, stating that it's a "Beautiful new ballad approached with class and assurance by Jones, and smartly arranged by Ralph Carmichael." The publication noted that it "should quickly surpass his recent chart winner 'Now I Know.'" The Anaheim Bulletin described Jones' voice as "Rich baritone with cello-warmth".

=== Chart performance ===
The track debuted on the Billboard Hot 100 on August 26, 1967, remaining on the chart for two weeks with a peak position of number 92. "Our Song" was ranked higher on the Billboard Easy Listening survey, reaching number 13 during an eight-week run on it starting on August 26, 1967. "Our Song" was Jones' final entry on the Cashbox Top 100 Singles singles chart. It reached number 76 during a five-week run on it. On the Record World 100 Top Pops chart the track peaked at number 107, but was ranked higher on their Top-Non Rock survey as well, reaching number 10 in October.

=== Track listing ===
7" vinyl single

- "Our Song" – 2:47
- "Michelle" – 3:38

== Charts ==
Chart performance for "Our Song"
Chart (1967)	Peak position
US Billboard Hot 100	92
US Billboard Easy Listening	13
US Cashbox Top 100 Singles	76
US Record World 100 Top Pops	96
US Record World Top Non-Rock	10
