= Eleonora Brown =

Italian film actress (born 1948)

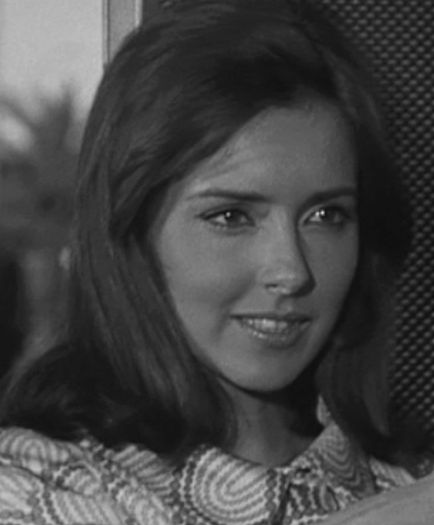
- Eleonora Brown in Cuore matto... matto da legare (1967)
- Born: August 22, 1948 (age 77); Naples, Campania, Italy
- Occupations: Actress; translator
- Years active: 1960–1968, 2018
- Known for: Two Women

Eleonora Brown (born August 22, 1948) is an Italian former film actress. Her first, and perhaps biggest, role was at age twelve as the daughter of Sophia Loren's character in Two Women (1960).

== Career ==
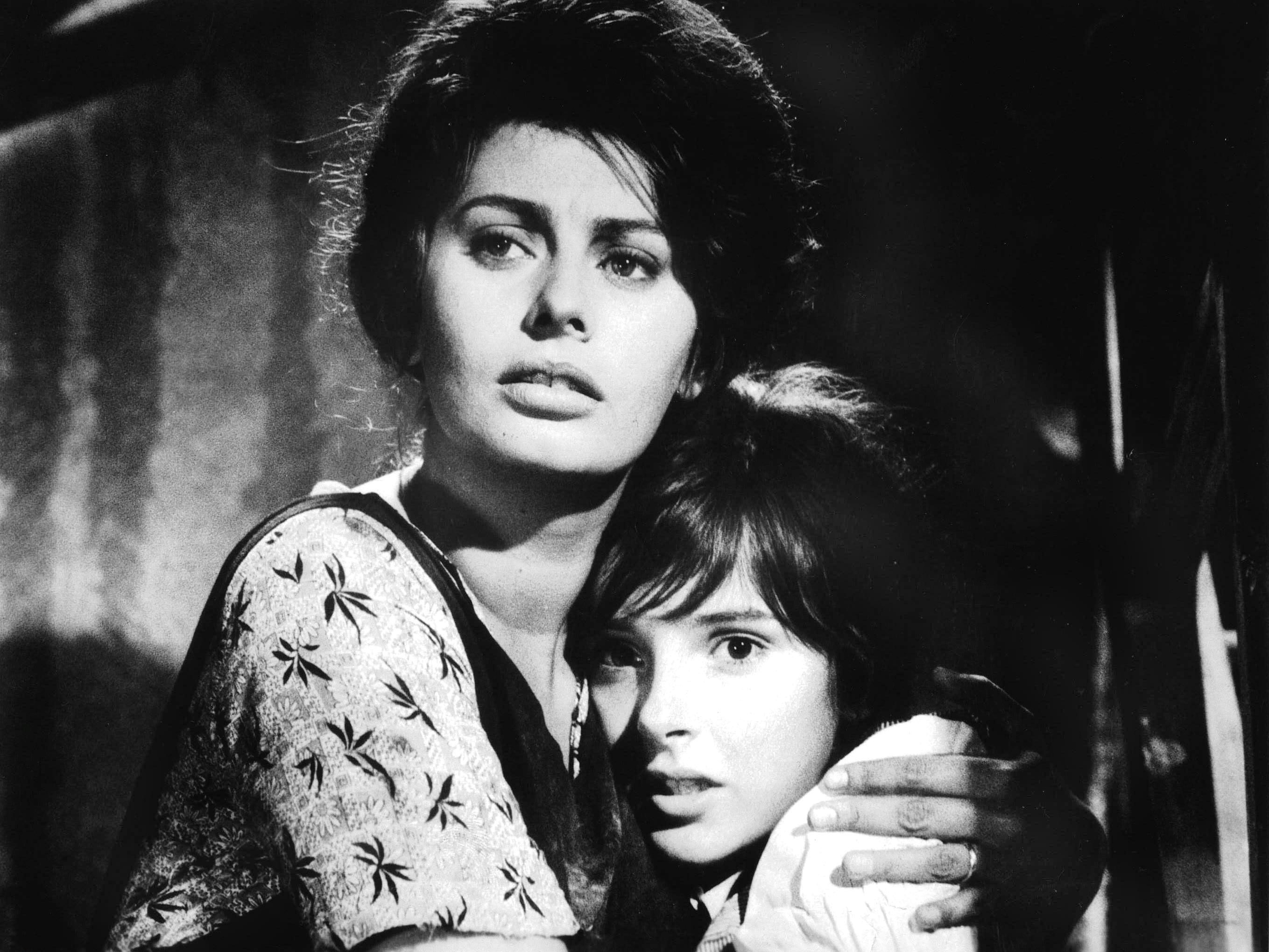
Brown and Loren in a scene from Two Women

Brown's debut acting role was in Two Women (1960). In an interview about the movie, Brown stated that Sophia Loren, who played her mother, protected her from some of the underlying implications of the rape scene in the film. She also said that director Vittorio De Sica brought her to tears for the climactic final scene (when her character learns that Jean-Paul Belmondo's character has died) by saying that a telegram had arrived saying that Brown's parents had died in an accident.

Brown appeared in a few other films in the 1960s, including The Sailor from Gibraltar, The Tiger and the Pussycat and Cuore matto... matto da legare, before choosing to retire from acting at age 19, after her appearance in The Young, the Evil, and the Savage (1968).

Brown later attended John Cabot University in Rome, graduating with a degree in Business and Economics. She then worked as a translator at the Italian Parliament, while also doing voice acting, in both English and Italian, for two decades in Italy.

Brown made her first screen appearance in 50 years in the 2018 Italian film Un amore così grande (A Love So Big). The film focuses on the world of opera in Verona, Italy, and features performances by the operatic pop trio Il Volo.

== Family ==
Brown's parents met when her American father was introduced to her Neapolitan mother while he was working with the International Red Cross in post–World War II Italy. Brown was married once, and was widowed in 1993.
