= Il silenzio =

Studio album by Dalida
- Released: 1965
- Recorded: 1965
- Genres: World music; pop; rock and roll
- Label: Barclay Records

Dalida chronology
Amore scusami (1964)	Il silenzio (1965)	Pensiamoci ogni sera (1966)

Il silenzio is an album by Dalida. It marked her comeback to a more successful career (her last big hit was the 1962 "Le Petit Gonzales"). It contains her success "Il silenzio (Bonsoir mon amour)", "Scandale dans la famille" and the Greek flavoured "La Danse de Zorba" (her singing version of "Zorba's Dance" by Mikis Theodorakis for the 1964 movie Zorba the Greek).

== Track listing ==
1. Il silenzio (Bonsoir mon amour)
2. Tu me voles
3. Son chapeau
4. La Vie en rose
5. Toi pardonne-moi
6. Le Flamenco
7. Scandale dans la famille
8. Le Soleil et la Montagne
9. C'est irréparable
10. Un enfant
11. Je ne dirai ni oui, ni non
12. La Danse de Zorba

== Singles ==
- 1965 La Danse de Zorba
- 1965 Viva la pappa / Hene ma tov / Le Printemps sur la colline / La Sainte Totoche
- 1965 Il silenzio (Bonsoir mon amour)
