= Gianni Puccini =

Italian screenwriter (1914–1968)

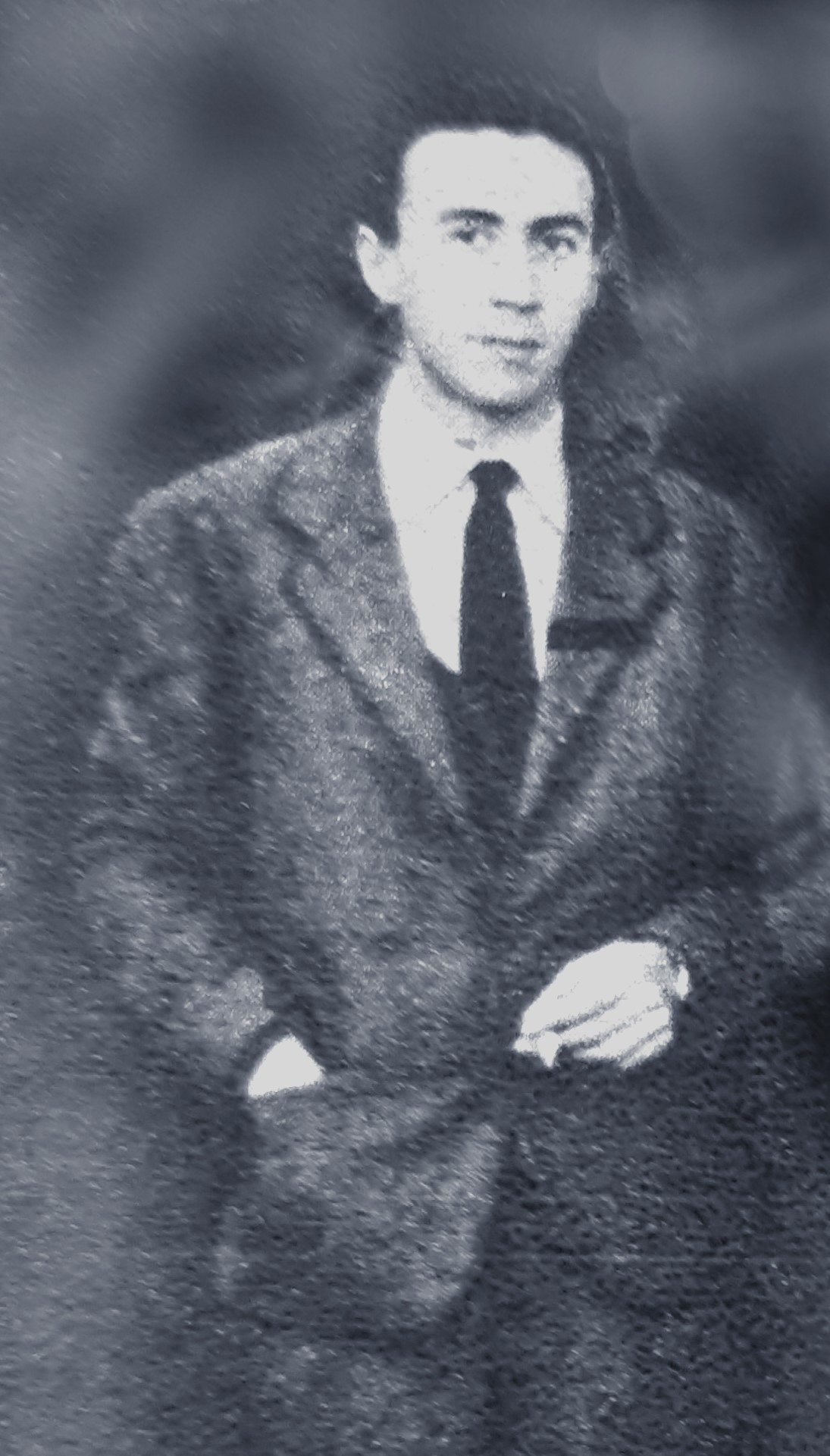
- Born: 9 November 1914; Milan, Kingdom of Italy
- Died: 3 December 1968 (aged 54); Rome, Italy
- Occupations: Film director; screenwriter
- Years active: 1940–1968

Gianni Puccini (9 November 1914 – 3 December 1968) was an Italian screenwriter and film director. He wrote for 32 films between 1940 and 1967. He also directed 18 films between 1951 and 1968.

== Selected filmography ==
- Fourth Page (1942)
- Ossessione (1943)
- Tragic Hunt (1947)
- Bitter Rice (1949)
- Persiane chiuse (1950)
- The Captain of Venice (1951)
- Rome 11:00 (1952)
- Days of Love (1954)
- Sunset in Naples (1955)
- Supreme Confession (1956)
- My Wife's Enemy (1959 - directed)
- I cuori infranti (1963 - directed)
- The Seven Cervi Brothers (1968 - directed)
