= Cuore matto =

1967 single by Little Tony

Single by Little Tony

from the album Questo mondo non mi va
- B-side: "Gente che mi parla di te"
- Released: January 1967
- Genre: Pop
- Label: Durium Records
- Songwriters: Armando Ambrosino and Totò Savio

Little Tony singles chronology
"Perdonala" (1966)	"Cuore matto" (1967)	"Peggio per me" (1967)

Audio
- "Cuore matto" on YouTube

"Cuore matto" (transl. "Crazy Heart") is a song composed by Armando Ambrosino and Totò Savio, and performed by Little Tony. The song premiered at the seventeenth Sanremo Music Festival, in which Little Tony presented the song in couple with Mario Zelinotti.

The single peaked at first place for nine consecutive weeks on the Italian hit parade. It sold in excess of a million copies and was awarded a gold disc in May 1967.

The song also named a film, Cuore matto... matto da legare , directed by Mario Amendola and starred by the same Little Tony and by Eleonora Brown.

The song was later covered by several artists, including Dalida, Gianni Morandi, Teruhiko Saigō, Fausto Leali and Kati Kovács. It was also used in several films, notably Bernardo Bertolucci's Besieged and Pedro Almodóvar's Bad Education.

== Track listing ==
- 7" single – Ld A 7500
1. "Cuore matto" (Armando Ambrosino, Totò Savio)
2. "Gente che mi parla di te" (Little Tony, Mario Capuano, Tony Cucchiara)

== Charts ==
Chart (1967)	Peak position
Argentina (CAPIF)	6
Chile (Billboard)	4
Italy (Musica e dischi)	1
Mexico (Radio Mil)	9
Spain (AFYVE)	12
