= I Giganti =

1960s Italian pop band

I Giganti are an Italian pop band founded in 1964.

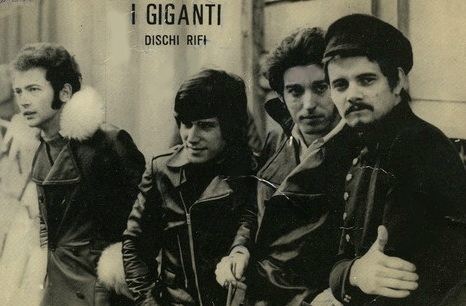
I giganti in 1964

In the 1960s, they had a number of hits including Una ragazza in due, an Italian version of Mister Murray's Down Comes the Rain. They are renowned for having released one of the earliest concept albums of Italian progressive rock in Italy called Terra in bocca. After disbanding in the early 1970s, I Giganti reformed in the 1990s and are still occasionally touring. Drummer Enrico Maria Papes is currently the only band member from the original lineup.

== Personnel ==
- Enrico Maria Papes - drums
- Giacomo Di Martino - guitar
- Sergio Di Martino - bass
- Francesco Marsella - keyboards
- Settimio "Silver" Corzani - bagpipe

== Discography ==
- 1966 - I Giganti (Ri-Fi, RFM LP 14801)
- 1969 - Mille idee dei Giganti (Ri-Fi, RFM LP 14034)
- 1971 - Terra in bocca (Ri-Fi, RDZ-ST-14207)
