= Durium Records =

Italian record label (1935–1989)

- Founded: 1935
- Founder: Alberto Aroldi
- Defunct: 1989
- Genre: Pop
- Country of origin: Italy
- Location: Milan

Durium was an Italian record label, active from 1935 to 1989. Part of the catalogue and the brand were subsequently taken over by Ricordi, who used it for some reissues. Its initial trademark consisted of the writing Durium in block letters, surmounted by the stylisation of three trumpets and an eagle. Immediately after the war, this logo was abandoned to move to the stylisation of a disk with three internal rays crossed by the writing Durium in italics.

== History ==
=== Early years ===
Durium SA was founded in 1935 in Milan (originally as Durium La Voce dell'Impero) by a group of Milanese entrepreneurs including Martinengo and Alberto Airoldi, who became its president. The headquarters were in Corso Garibaldi in Milan and production covered both discs and sound producers.

The first records released were recitations of tales for children, and other productions aimed at emigrants and troops abroad. In the years 1935/1936 - lacking the material for the production - discs were also published on cardboard supports, containing language courses, technical courses, and propaganda. With the outbreak of war the offices and some recording studios were transferred from Milan to Erba.

=== Development ===
At the end of the Second World War after the return to Milan in the new headquarters in the passage of the Osii 2 the company, meanwhile become Durium, moves the administrative and representation offices in via Manzoni. The core of what will be the burning and printing remains in Erba.

It is a period of economic difficulties linked to the still immature Italian discography; the financial position stabilizes in 1948 with the entry into the society of the Armenian-born entrepreneur Krikor Mintanjan (whose surname is sometimes Italianized in Mintangian) who nominates his wife Elisabel responsible director and assumes as artistic director the nephew of the co-founder Alberto, Aurelio Airoldi, who will remain in the company until 1987, and the pianist, arranger, and composer Franco Cassano, who will remain at the direction until 1986.

In addition to directing the record company, Cassano publishes several albums for the label as a pianist and writes several hits for their artists such as Sei divent nera for Los Marcellos Ferial, also recorded in Chinese, Melodia for Jimmy Fontana, brought to success in the Kingdom Engaged by Engelbert Humperdinck with the title The Way It Used to Be and which will be engraved in the world in several other languages.

It is above all the scouting activity of new artists, as well as the development of new promotion and sales strategies, to relaunch the label. In the fifties, while the Italian discography has its own identity with the birth of record companies such as RCA Italiana and CGD, new artists are produced such as Aurelio Fierro, Flo Sandon's, Roberto Murolo and Marino Marini, giving a great boost to the activity in light music.

In the sixties are promoted characters like Little Tony, Los Marcellos Ferial, Rocky Roberts, Bruno Venturini, Le Snobs, Wess, Dori Ghezzi, Fausto Papetti, Passengers, Camaleonti, Nini Rosso, I Vianella; artists who enjoy a strong support thanks to the director of the press office of the record company Luciano Giacotto who in the same years is also director of the youth music magazine Ciao Amici, as well as producer.

The Durium sensed since the fifties the importance of distributing licensed foreign music using its factory in Erba; here is the distribution of international artists such as Al Caiola, Don Costa, James Brown, Paul Anka, Mouth & MacNeal, Donna Summer, Ferrante & Teicher, Dee D. Jackson, Steve Lawrence, Eydie Gormé, Don McLean, Shirley Bassey, Plastic Bertrand, Telex and many others.

In 1977 Durium reached its peak with a net sales increase of 35% compared to the previous year, for a total of 6.25 million dollars at the time.

=== Corporate structure ===
In a short time Durium became a leading company in the Italian recording world; even in advance of many multinational companies, already in the first post-war period he began to create a complete system dedicated to artists: from recording albums to their distribution, also managing printing and promotion.

Regarding the registration, in via Troya (near Piazza Napoli) was set up a well-equipped recording studio kept continuously updated.

At Erba, in via Trieste, the production plant where long-playing was printed and the music cassettes under the responsibility of Valsecchi and then Mario Cvek had been left since the post-war period. The modernization proceeded seamlessly with continuous investments, to the point that in 1977 the plant was distinguished in the Italian landscape for the modernity of the plants and for the quality of work. Throughout the era of vinyl and audio cassettes, a good part the activity was carried out on behalf of third parties for the most famous and important Italian record companies.

=== Failure ===
In 1981 Durium celebrated its fiftieth anniversary in advance, but sales, thanks to the diffusion of recordable audiocassettes and the spread of music through free radio stations, are already falling sharply: from 800,000 copies a few years earlier, a hit by a number one it can not sell more than 400 000 copies.

The crisis worsens in the second half of the eighties, coinciding with the diffusion of CDs and at the same time with many record companies: in 1986 Krikor Mintanjan abandoned the company, taken over by Luca Rinaldi, who subsequently sold it to Enrico Rovelli; the same man who also bought Ariston Records in the same period.

Despite this in the eighties continues the activity of scouting leading to the success of many artists, including Vanadium, one of the first Italian heavy metal bands, and a young Fiordaliso that launches at the Sanremo Festival hits like Una Dirty Poetry, Oramai and I do not want not the moon.

Rovelli then tries to restructure the company, which involves the abandonment of production and printing, that is the now too expensive Erba plant, and the outsourcing of recording and mixing of disks, thus also abandoning the studies in Piazza Napoli.

The same Rovelli tries to establish a company, Kono Records, with the intention of merging the catalogues of Durium and Ariston, but because of the liabilities accumulated by the two companies the operation is not successful.

The Kono therefore born as an independent record company incorporating some artists of the Ariston and Durium, which both cease all operations in 1989. The offices of the registered office, in via Manzoni, are also abandoned.

=== Durium catalogue ===
While Rovelli will continue his career as a manager of many artists, including Vasco Rossi, the catalogs of Durium and Ariston will be at the center of legal disputes, being then sold to Ricordi and subsequently merging into the patrimony of the purchaser BMG. The same Durium brand is acquired by these companies and, although not formally renewed, has been used occasionally to reprint the records of some artists.

=== Sub-labels ===
Like many other record companies, Durium also gave birth to some sub-labels of which the best known is the Italian Targa, which has also released some albums and 45 rpm of Vasco Rossi; in addition, Durium distributed other labels such as Sprint, Titanus and Karim.

The Durium, in addition to having recorded and printed for years respectively artists and media for other companies without factories, has also taken care of the distribution for other record companies. For example, for some years it has been involved in the distribution of the PDU, the record company founded by Mina.

== Releases ==
Dates below are based on the disc label, or on the vinyl or, finally, on the cover; if none of these elements had a date, on the numbering of the catalogue; if existing, the month and the day are shown over the year.

=== 78 rpm ===
Catalogue No.	Year	Performer	Title
A 9127	9 October 1946	Tullio Mobiglia e la sua orchestra	Mr.Jinx/Alì Babà
A 9162	20 May 1947	Flo Sandon's	Amado mio/Put the blame on mame (Non v'innamorate) dal film Gilda
A 9269	17 September 1948	Flo Sandon's	O mama, mama/Louisiana
A 9311	1949	Flo Sandon's	Troppo tardi/I pappagalli
A 9328	1949	Bruno Rosettani	Balbettando.../O suocera
A 9336	16 March 1949	Flo Sandon's	Samba a Posillipo/Ay! Che Samba!
A 9337	21 March 1949	Flo Sandon's	The man I love/Star Dust
A 9338	15 March 1949	Flo Sandon's	Stormy weather/Summer time
A 9362	1949	Flo Sandon's (sul lato A)/Bruno Rosettani (sul lato B)	Verde luna/E' troppo tardi
A 9468	1949	Bruno Rosettani	Jump maestro/I pirati di Baitalà
A 9474	1949	Special Starmaker Hot, sax tenore solista Tullio Mobiglia	Hiroscyma/L'oca zoppa
A 9477	1949	Wanda Osiris	Sentimental/Notturno d'amore
A 9505	1950	Flo Sandon's col Complesso Gambarelli (sul lato A)/Complesso Gambarelli (sul lato B)	Portrait of Jennie/Harry Lime Theme
A 9709	27 January 1951	Flo Sandon's	They say it's wonderful/On an island with you
A 9754	1951	Flo Sandon's	Sacrificio./Grazie dei fiori
A 9870	1951	Flo Sandon's	Quando fumo/Lasciate entrare il sole
A 9941	1952	Enzo Brunelli	Vola colomba/Papaveri e papere
A 9942	1952	Flo Sandon's	El negro zumbon/T'ho voluto bene
A 9970	1952	Flo Sandon's	Stringimi sul cuor/Jezebel
A 9996	1952	Roberto Murolo	Passero sulitario/Siente a mme
A 10040	23 September 1952	Flo Sandon's (sul lato A)/Flo Sandon's e Quartetto Vocale Radars (sul lato B)	Mi Cafetal/Jezebel
M 10094	1952	Edoardo Lucchina	Padam Padam/Domino
M 10095	1952	Edoardo Lucchina	Coimbra/T'amo t'amo t'amo
M 10096	1952	Edoardo Lucchina	Blue tango/Flamenco
M 10097	1952	Edoardo Lucchina	L'anima dei poeti/Mambo brasileiro
A 10121	14 January 1953	Flo Sandon's	L'altra/Qualcuno cammina
A 10122	1953	Flo Sandon's	Acque amare/Il tamburino del reggimento
A 10124	1953	Bruno Rosettani	Vecchio scarpone/Papà Pacifico
A 10128	30 March 1953	Luciano Sangiorgi	Arlecchinata/Noi due
A 10134	1953	Flo Sandon's	I've been kissed before/Trinidad
M 10164	1953	Edoardo Lucchina	Sciovia/Il cammelliere
A 10179	1953	Flo Sandon's	Il canarino/Duska
A 10187	12 May 1953	Flo Sandon's	Un uomo per me/Lo sa il ciel
M 10196	1953	Edoardo Lucchina	Smarrimento/Tango delle rose
A 10198	13 July 1953	Flo Sandon's (sul lato A)/Flo Sandon's e Bruno Rosettani (sul lato B)	Viejo Brazil/Sugar Bush
A 10217	1953	Roberto Murolo	Cartulina 'e Napule/Tarantella 'e na vota
A 10238	28 September 1953	Flo Sandon's	Moulin Rouge/Un bacio ancor (Kiss)
A 10278	10 November 1953	Flo Sandon's	Jurnata triste/Te sto aspettanno
M 10282	1953	Edoardo Lucchina	A media luz/No es lindo
M 10283	1953	Edoardo Lucchina	Adios Pampa mia/El tropero del amor
M 10284	1953	Edoardo Lucchina	Mi alma/Garua
A 10288	1953	Flo Sandon's, Bruno Rosettani e Duo Blengio (sul lato A)/Bruno Rosettani e Duo Blengio (sul lato B)	...E su il cappello (e giù il cappello)/Non ritorni più
A 10289	22 December 1953	Flo Sandon's (sul lato A)/Flo Sandon's, Bruno Rosettani e Duo Blengio (sul lato B)	Lilì/Zin Zin Zin
A 10292	22 December 1953	Flo Sandon's	Lilì/The call of the far away hills (La voce dei monti)
A 10311	1954	Flo Sandon's e Bruno Rosettani (sul lato A)/Flo Sandon's e Bruno Rosettani e Coro (sul lato B)	Aveva un bavero/Arriva il direttore
A 10314	1954	Bruno Rosettani (sul lato A)/Flo Sandon's e Bruno Rosettani (sul lato B)	Mogliettina/Cirillino Ci
A 10351	1954	Flo Sandon's	Mon Pays/O Mein Papà
M 10368	1954	Edoardo Lucchina	La testa all'ombra/Troppo orgogliosa
A 10384	August 1954	Roberto Murolo	Scapricciatiello/Serenata a muglierema
A 10385	August 1954	Roberto Murolo	Sci...sci...(piazza dei martiri)/Embe' mberebe' mberebe'
A 10386	August 1954	Roberto Murolo	Cu 'a bona maniera/O jes!
A 10409	14 September 1954	Flo Sandon's e Quartetto Langosz	Marieta...(monta in gondola)/Quattro gondole
A 10410	15 September 1954	Flo Sandon's	E' stata un'avventura/Fante di cuori
A 10411	15 September 1954	Flo Sandon's	Johnny Guitar/Inutilmente
A 10412	16 September 1954	Flo Sandon's	Tu You Du/Segreto d'amore
A 10413	16 September 1954	Flo Sandon's	Johnny Guitar/Secret love
A 10448	1954	Flo Sandon's	Pioggia/Mi brucia il cuor
A 10453	8–10 November 1954	Flo Sandon's e Trio Joice (sul lato A)/Flo Sandon's e Quartetto Vocale (sul lato B)	That's amore (Questo è amore)/The Deadwood Stage (Postiglione va !)
A 10482	13 December 1954	Flo Sandon's e Quartetto Langosz (sul lato A)/Flo Sandon's e Trio Joice (sul lato B)	Saltarello geloso/L'ammore è 'nu canario
A 10505	1955	Flo Sandon's	Sentiero/Non penserò che a te
A 10507	15–18 January 1955	Aurelio Fierro (sul lato A)/Flo Sandon's e Trio Joice (sul lato B)	Che fai tu luna in ciel/Zucchero e pepe
A 10571	20 May 1955	Flo Sandon's	Sento nel cuore Maggio/Baciatevi stasera
A 10572	1955	Flo Sandon's	La storia di un povero cuore/Non parlare... baciami
A 10573	1955	Flo Sandon's	Ombra del porto/Un brivido di vento
A 10696	1956	Flo Sandon's	L'amore è una cosa meravigliosa/Quanto m'amerai
A 10698	9–14 January 1956	Flo Sandon's	Malagueña/Oho Aha (Ciao)
A 10722	1956	Nella Colombo	Sogni d'or/Il bosco innamorato
A 10799	1956	Aurelio Fierro	Guaglione/Piccerella
A 10855	3 October 1956	Flo Sandon's	La mia fortuna/Se guardo te
A 10975	14 September 1957	Aurelio Fierro	Suonno e Fantasia/Lazzarella
A 11026	22 July 1957	Aurelio Fierro	'A sunnambula/Doppo Pasca'... viene me pesca'!
A 11071	1957	Nella Colombo	Vivrò/Un angelo è sceso a Brooklyn
A 11108	1958	Quartetto Radar	I trulli di Alberobello/Campane di santa Lucia
A 11109	1958	Nella Colombo	L'edera/Arsura
A 11110	1958	Nella Colombo	Mille volte/E' molto facile dirsi addio
A 11111	1958	Bruno Rosettani e Duo Blengio	Tu sei del mio paese/Cos'è un bacio
A 11112	1958	Bruno Rosettani	Fantastica/Nozze d'oro
A 11113	1958	Bruno Rosettani	Se tornassi tu/La canzone che piace a te
A 11114	1958	Aurelio Fierro	Io sono te/Amare un'altra
A 11115	20 January 1958	Aurelio Fierro e Trio Joice (sul lato A)/ Aurelio Fierro (sul lato B)	Fragole e cappellini/Giuro d'amarti così
A 11116	1958	Aurelio Fierro	Nel blu dipinto di blu/Timida serenata
A 11117	1958	Aurelio Fierro	Giuro d'amarti così/I trulli di Alberobello
A 11118	1958	Flo Sandon's e Quartetto Radar (sul lato B)	Io sono te/Timida serenata
A 11119	1958	Flo Sandon's	Giuro d'amarti così/Non potrai dimenticare
A 11120	1958	Flo Sandon's	Ho disegnato un cuore/Non potrai dimenticare
A 11259	19 January 1959	Flo Sandon's	Ma baciami/Conoscerti
A 11260	1959	Flo Sandon's	Tu sei qui/Per tutta la vita

=== 33 rpm ===
==== 25 cm ====
Catalogue No.	Year	Performer	Title
ms Al 501	1955	Roberto Murolo	Roberto Murolo e la sua chitarra (I)
ms Al 502	1955	Roberto Murolo	Roberto Murolo e la sua chitarra (II)
ms Al 503	1955	Luciano Sangiorgi	Motivi di Lecuona e dell'America Latina
ms Al 504	1955	Luciano Sangiorgi	Luciano Sangiorgi al pianoforte
ms Al 505	1955	Edoardo Lucchina	Ballando con Edoardo Lucchina - Prima raccolta di successi
ms Al 506	1955	Manuel Diaz Cano	Celebri melodie per assolo di chitarra
ms Al 507	1955	Roberto Murolo e Luciano Sangiorgi	Melodie napoletane per canto e pianoforte
ms Al 508	1955	Luciano Sangiorgi	Motivi di successo
ms Al 509	1955	Aurelio Fierro	Melodie del Golfo - Prima raccolta
ms A 510	1955	Aurelio Fierro	Melodie del Golfo - Seconda raccolta
ms Al 511	1955	Flo Sandon's	Parata di successi n°1
ms Al 512	1955	Flo Sandon's	Parata di successi n°2
ms A 513	1955	Edoardo Lucchina	Ballando con Lucchina - Seconda raccolta di successi
ms Al 514	1955	Federico Bergamini, Edoardo Lucchina, Tullio Mobiglia	Ballate con le orchestre
ms Al 515	1955	Federico Bergamini, Edoardo Lucchina, Tullio Mobiglia	Ballate con le orchestre
ms Al 516	1955	Roberto Murolo	Roberto Murolo e la sua chitarra
ms Al 517	1955	Roberto Murolo	Roberto Murolo e la sua chitarra
ms A 518	1955	Aurelio Fierro	Canzoni d'altri tempi - Prima raccolta
ms Al 519	1955	AA.VV.	Danze folcloristiche con i complessi di A, Aiello, A.Casella, E.Lucchina, L.Marcheselli, A.Rota
ms Al 520	1955	Irma Bozzi Lucca	Canti natalizi per canto, coro e orchestra
ms A 521	1956	Flo Sandon's	Parata di successi N° 3 - Musiche da film
ms A 522	1956	Dante Perduca e il suo Quartetto all'italiana	25 minuti di liscio
ms A 523	1956	Gian Franco Intra, Tullio Mobiglia, Carlo Savina	Ballate con le orchestre
ms A 524	1956	Flo Sandon's, Bruno Rosettani, Aurelio Fierro	5º Festival della canzone - Sanremo 1955
ms A 525	1956	Edoardo Lucchina	Ballando con Edoardo Lucchina - Terza raccolta di successi (Motivi del tempo passato)
ms A 526	1956	Aurelio Fierro	Melodie del Golfo - Terza raccolta
ms A 527	1956	Sergio Centi e la sua chitarra	Canzoni romane - Prima raccolta
ms A 528	1956	Gian Franco Intra e la sua orchestra	I ballabili del 5º Festival di Sanremo
ms A 529	1956	Dante Perduca e il suo Sestetto all'italiana	Dolce musica
ms A 530	1956	Bruno Rosettani	Serie di successi N° 1
ms Al 531	1956	La chitarra di Manuel Diaz Cano	Arie popolari
ms A 532	1956	Sergio Centi	Angolo di cielo
ms Al 533	1956	Luciano Sangiorgi	Impressioni di New York
ms A 534	1956	Gian Franco Intra quartetto	Crazy Rhythm
ms A 535	1956	Marino Marini e il suo quartetto	Allegri ballabili (I)
ms Al 536	1956	Luciano Sangiorgi pianoforte e ritmi	Impressioni di Parigi
ms A 537	1956	Federico Bergamini, Gian Franco Intra, Edoardo Lucchina, Tullio Mobiglia, Carlo Savina	Ballate con le orchestre
ms M 538	1956	Edoardo Lucchina	Tanghi celebri
ms A 539	1956	Edoardo Lucchina	Ballabili con ritornello cantato
ms A 541	1956	Sergio Centi e la sua chitarra	Canzoni romane - Seconda raccolta
ms A 542	1956	Marino Marini e il suo quartetto	Allegri ballabili (II)
ms A 544	1956	Bruno Rosettani	Serie di successi N° 2
ms Al 545	17 February 1956	Roberto Murolo e la sua chitarra	Oggi, dimane e...sempre
ms A 546	1956	Aurelio Fierro	Melodie del Golfo - Quarta raccolta
ms Al 547	1956	Tito Schipa	Canzoni di Napoli
ms A 548	1956	Aurelio Fierro	Canzoni d'altri tempi - Seconda raccolta
ms A 549	1956	Rino Salviati e la sua chitarra	Canzoni di successo - prima raccolta
ms A 550	1956	Rino Salviati e la sua chitarra	Vecchi successi - seconda raccolta
ms Al 551	1956	Luciano Sangiorgi pianoforte e ritmi	Impressioni italiane
ms A 552	1956	Flo Sandon's	Parata di successi N° 4
ms A 553	1956	Marino Marini e il suo quartetto	Allegri ballabili (III)
ms A 554	1956	Gianfranco Intra, Edoardo Lucchina, Federico Bergamini	Ballate con le orchestre
ms Al 555	1956	Roberto Murolo e la sua chitarra	Vecchia Napoli
ms A 556	1956	AA.VV.	Le dieci canzoni del Festival di Sanremo 1956
ms M 557	1956	Edoardo Lucchina organo Hammond, piano e ritmi	Ballando sui motivi del Festival di Sanremo 1956
ms Al 558	1956	Luciano Sangiorgi	Concerto di Varsavia
ms A 559	1956	Marino Marini e il suo quartetto	Allegri ballabili (IV)
ms Al 560	1956	Luciano Sangiorgi	Impressioni dell'America Latina
ms Al 561	1956	Edoardo Lucchina, Tullio Mobiglia	Ballabili di successo
ms A 562	12 June 1956	Aurelio Fierro	Canzoni d'altri tempi - Terza raccolta
ms Al 563	1956	Manuel Diaz Cano	Celebri melodie per assolo di chitarra
ms M 564	1956	Edoardo Lucchina	Valzer celebri
ms A 565	1956	Aurelio Fierro	4º Festival della Canzone Napoletana 1956
ms Al 566	1956	Roberto Murolo e la sua chitarra	Vecchia Napoli - Volume 2
ms A 568	1956	Alberto Rabagliati ed Evelina Sironi	Le canzoni de "La Madonina"
ms A 569	1957	Rino Salviati	Da Siviglia a Buenos Ayres
ms A 571	1957	Marino Marini	Allegri ballabili (V)
ms A 572	1957	AA.VV.	7º Festival della canzone italiana - Sanremo 1957
ms Al 576	1957	Roberto Murolo e la sua chitarra	Vecchia Napoli - Volume 3
ms Al 577	1957	Bruno Quirinetta	Bruno Quirinetta e la sua orchestra
ms A 578	1957	Aurelio Fierro, Olga Pizzi e Enza Dorian	V Festival della canzone napoletana - 1957
ms A 579	1957	Mario Pezzotta	Mario Pezzotta e i suoi solisti
ms A 580	1957	Marino Marini	Marino Marini e il suo quartetto
ms A 581	1957	Il Coro del C.A.I. di Padova	Canti della montagna
ms A 582	1957	Leonildo Marcheselli e il suo complesso	Danze Folcloristiche vol.2
ms A 583	1957	Flo Sandon's e Quartetto Radar	canzoni varie
ms A 584	1957	Marino Marini	Marino Marini e il suo quartetto
ms A 585	1957	Mario Pezzotta e la sua orchestra	Seconda raccolta
ms A 586	1957	AA.VV.	Night club in Italia
ms A 587	1957	Aurelio Fierro	Piedigrotta 1957
ms A 588	1958	AA.VV.	Le dieci canzoni finaliste dell'8º Festival di Sanremo - 1958
ms A 589	1958	AA.VV. (Isa Di Marzio, Bruno Rosettani, Duo Blengio, Nella Colombo e altri)	Però...la vita è bella
ms A 590	1958	Edoardo Lucchina	Ballabili di successo
ms A 591	1958	Quartetto Radar, Vickie Henderson, Flo Sandon's e Marino Marini	Schermo sonoro - Musiche da films
ms A 594	1958	Aurelio Fierro	VI Festival della canzone napoletana
ms Al 595	1958	Roberto Murolo e la sua chitarra	Vecchia Napoli - Volume 4
ms A 596	1958	Marino Marini	Marino Marini e il suo quartetto
ms A 598	1958	Quartetto Radar	Un disco...dei Radar
ms A 602	1959	Marino Marini	Marino Marini e il suo quartetto (Piove! ciao, ciao bambina)
ms A 604	1959	Flo Sandon's	8 African Ritual Songs
ms Al 605	1959	Roberto Murolo e la sua chitarra	Vecchia Napoli - Volume 5
ms Al 606	1959	Roberto Murolo e la sua chitarra	Omaggio a Salvatore Di Giacomo
ms Al 607	1959	Roberto Murolo e la sua chitarra	Vecchia Napoli - Volume 6
ms M 609	1959	Edoardo Lucchina	10 tanghi per fisarmonica e ritmi
ms A 611	1959	Roberto Murolo	Omaggio a Libero Bovio
ms AI 612	13 March 1963	Roberto Murolo	Omaggio a E.A. Mario

==== 30 cm ====
Catalogue No.	Year	Performer	Title
ms A 77001	1959	Marino Marini e il suo quartetto	Marino Marini e il suo quartetto
ms A 77002	1959	Roy Thompson	Ambassador of Calypso
ms A 77003	30 October 1957	AA.VV.	Vacanze in Italia N° 1 - Raccolta di ballabili cantati
ms A 77004	1959	Voci di Alighiero Noschese e Maria Virginia Benati con l'orchestra di Mario Migliardi	I dodici oroscopi
ms A 77005	1959	AA.VV.	Pensando a te
ms A 77006	1959	Luciano Sangiorgi	Musica per meditare
ms A 77008	3 April 1958	AA.VV.	Vacanze in Italia N° 2 - Raccolta di ballabili cantati
ms A 77009	1959	Roberto Murolo.	Roberto Murolo e la sua chitarra
ms A 77011	1959	Aurelio Fierro	Canzoni di successo
ms A 77012	27 September 1958	AA.VV.	Vacanze in Italia N° 3 - Raccolta di ballabili cantati
ms A 77013	1959	Marino Marini	Marino Marini e il suo quartetto N° 2
ms A 77014	1959	AA.VV.	Let's dance in Carnival
ms A 77015	1959	AA.VV.	9º Festival della Canzone Italiana - Sanremo 1959
ms A 77016	1959	Marino Marini	Marino Marini e il suo quartetto N° 3
ms A 77017	1959	AA.VV.	Week End - Raccolta di canzoni italiane
ms A 77018	1959	Luciano Sangiorgi - Pianoforte e ritmi	I grandi successi italiani e stranieri
ms A 77019	15 April 1959	AA.VV.	Juke-box Music
ms A 77020	1959	AA.VV.	7º Festival della Canzone Napoletana - 1959
ms A 77021	1959	Gastone Parigi	Gastone Parigi e il suo quintetto
ms A 77022	1959	AA.VV.	Vacanze in Italia N° 4 - Raccolta di ballabili cantati
ms A 77023	1959	AA.VV.	Hi-fi Club - Raccolta di ballabili cantati
ms A 77024	1959	Little Tony and his brothers	Rock Parade
ms A 77027	1960	AA.VV.	X Festival della Canzone Italiana - 1960
ms A 77028 (ristampa di ms A 518)	1960	Aurelio Fierro	Canzoni d'altri tempi - Prima raccolta
ms A 77029	1960	Marino Marini	Marino Marini e il suo quartetto N° 4
ms A 77033	1960	Rino Salviati e Sergio Centi	Welcome To Rome
ms A 77035	1960	AA.VV.	Canzoni, Canzoni, Canzoni
ms A 77036	1960	AA.VV.	8º Festival della Canzone Napoletana - 1960
ms A 77037	1960	Marino Marini	Festival di Napoli 1960
ms A 77039	1960	AA.VV.	Vacanze in Italia N° 6 - Raccolta di ballabili cantati
ms A 77040	1960	AA.VV.	Un anno di canzoni - Raccolta di canzoni italiane
ms A 77041	1960	Marino Marini	Marino Marini e il suo quartetto N° 5
ms AI 77042	1960	Fausto Papetti	Raccolta
ms A 77047 (ristampa di ms A 548)	1960	Aurelio Fierro	Canzoni d'altri tempi - Seconda raccolta
ms AI 77051	1961	Roberto Murolo	Roberto Murolo e la sua chitarra
ms A 77058 (ristampa di ms A 562)	1961	Aurelio Fierro	Canzoni d'altri tempi - Terza raccolta
ms A 77064	1962	Aurelio Fierro	Canzoni d'altri tempi - quarta raccolta
ms A 77065	1963	Mario Pezzotta	In giro per i night clubs N° 3 - Arethusa club
ms Al 77069	1963	Roberto Murolo	Napoletana. Antologia cronologica della canzone partenopea - Primo volume (dal 1200 al 1700)
ms Al 77070	1963	Roberto Murolo	Napoletana. Antologia cronologica della canzone partenopea - Secondo volume (dal 1700 al 1820)
ms Al 77071	1963	Roberto Murolo	Napoletana. Antologia cronologica della canzone partenopea - Terzo volume (dal 1820 al 1880)
ms Al 77072	1964	Roberto Murolo	Napoletana. Antologia cronologica della canzone partenopea - Quarto volume (dal 1880 al 1897)
ms Al 77073	10 March 1964	Roberto Murolo	Napoletana. Antologia cronologica della canzone partenopea - Quinto volume (dal 1897 al 1909)
ms Al 77074	1964	Roberto Murolo	Napoletana. Antologia cronologica della canzone partenopea - Sesto volume (dal 1909 al 1915)
ms Al 77075	1964	Roberto Murolo	Napoletana. Antologia cronologica della canzone partenopea - Settimo volume (dal 1916 al 1925)
ms Al 77076	1964	Roberto Murolo	Napoletana. Antologia cronologica della canzone partenopea - Ottavo volume (dal 1925 al 1938)
ms Al 77077	1964	Leonildo Marcheselli e il suo quintetto folkloristico	Danze popolari
ms A 77080	1964	Little Tony	I successi di Little Tony
ms M 77082	1964	Edoardo Lucchina	14 tanghi
ms A 77091	1965	Flo Sandon's	Panoramica di canzoni con Flo Sandon's
ms Al 77094	1965	Roberto Murolo	Roberto Murolo e la sua chitarra
ms Pr 77096	1965	Edoardo Lucchina e la sua Orchestra	Ballabili per un week-end
ms Al 77101	6 May 1965	Roberto Murolo	Napoletana. Antologia cronologica della canzone partenopea - Nono volume (dal 1940 al 1950)
ms Al 77102	1965	Roberto Murolo	Napoletana. Antologia cronologica della canzone partenopea - Decimo volume (dal 1950 al 1954)
ms Al 77103	1965	Roberto Murolo	Napoletana. Antologia cronologica della canzone partenopea - Undicesimo volume (dal 1954 al 1956)
ms Al 77104	24 May 1965	Roberto Murolo	Napoletana. Antologia cronologica della canzone partenopea - Dodicesimo volume (dal 1956 al 1962)
ms AI 77115	1966	Sergio Centi	Romana - quinto volume
ms AI 77116	1966	Sergio Centi	Romana - sesto volume
ms AI 77117	1966	Sergio Centi	Romana - settimo volume
ms A 77120	1966	Santi Latora	Sentimentale
ms AI 77123	1966	Los Marcellos Ferial	I Marcellos Ferial
ms A 77130	1966	Alberto Rabagliati ed Evelina Sironi	Nostalgia de Milan
ms A 77132	1966	Jo Garsò e Paolo Ciarchi	Folk & Spiritual
ms A 77136	1966	Santi Latora	Great Themes From Great Motion Pictures
ms A 77141	1966	Little Tony	Riderà
ms A 77142	1966	Tony e Nelly	Tony e Nelly
ms A 77147	1966	Nanni Svampa	Milano tua
ms AI 77154	1967	Sergio Centi	Roma sei sempre stata casa mia
ms AI 77166	1967	Sergio Centi	Romana - decimo volume
ms A 77177	1967	Little Tony	Questo mondo non mi va
ms A 77185	1967	Sacha Ketoff	Aurorea
ms A 77188	1967	Santi Latora	Psycodelich Sound
ms A 77197	1968	Santi Latora	Professional
ms A 77198	1968	I Crazy Boys	Hai negli occhi tutto il sole del mondo
ms AI 77199	1968	Giorgio Gaslini	Grido
ms A 77200	1968	Little Tony	Il big Little Tony
ms A 77204	1968	AA. VV.	Durium Club Numero 1
ms AI 77208	1969	Udo Jürgens	Udo Jürgens
ms AI 77214	1969	I Nuovi Angeli	I Nuovi Angeli
ms A 77220	1969	Giorgio Gaslini, Edmonda Aldini e I Nuovi Angeli	Un quarto di vita
ms A 77225	25 July 1969	Nanni Svampa	Perché?
ms AI 77262	1970	Franco Cassano	Piacevolissimo
ms AI 77266	1971	Mino Reitano	L'uomo e la valigia
ms A 77269	1971	Santi Latora	Blue Flame
ms AI 77270	30 April 1971	Nanni Svampa, Lino Patruno e Franca Mazzola	Recital di Nanni Svampa, Lino Patruno e Franca Mazzola
ms AI 77274	1971	Fausto Papetti	I Remember N. 7: Ciao Italia
ms AI 77275	June 1971	Gino Paoli	Le due facce dell'amore
ms AI 77281	1971	Nanni Svampa	Nanni Svampa Canta Brassens - Volume Primo
ms AI 77282	1971	Nanni Svampa	Nanni Svampa Canta Brassens - Volume Secondo
ms AI 77283	1971	Nanni Svampa	Nanni Svampa Canta Brassens - Volume Terzo
ms AI 77284	1971	Fausto Papetti	12ª Raccolta
ms AI 77287	1971	Franca Mazzola e Lino Patruno	Sento il fischio del vapore
ms AI 77291	December 1971	Gino Paoli	Rileggendo vecchie lettere d'amore
ms AI 77296	1972	Mino Reitano	Ti amo tanto tanto
ms AI 77297	1972	Franco Franchi	L'altra faccia di Franco Franchi
ms A 77301	1972	Santi Latora	Sentimentale N° 3
ms AI 77302	1972	Lino Patruno	Il cabaret di Lino Patruno
ms AI 77306	1972	Franco Cassano	Golden themes from golden films
ms AI 77307	November 1972	J.E.T.	Fede, speranza, carità
ms AI 77308	November 1972	Loretta Goggi	Vieni via con me
ms AI 77309	November 1972	Gino Paoli	Amare per vivere
ms AI 77311	1973	Marcello Marrocchi	...e pensare che ti ho amato tanto
ms AI 77314	1973	Franca Mazzola	L'ultimo bar
ms M 77318	1973	Edoardo Lucchina	La casa verde
ms A 77319	1973	Augusto Righetti	Onirico
ms A 77321	1973	Santi Latora	Multi Sound Organ
ms AI 77322	1973	Mino Reitano	Partito per amore
ms AI 77327	1973	Mino Reitano	Mostra Internazionale Musica Leggera Venezia 1973
ms AI 77328	1973	Franco Cassano	Gradevolissimo N° 9
ms AI 77330	1973	Wess & Dori Ghezzi	Wess & Dori Ghezzi
ms AI 77336	1973	Loretta Goggi	Formula 2
ms AI 77338	1974	Mino Reitano	Tutto Mino
ms AI 77345	1974	Roberto Murolo	Raffaele Viviani presentato da Roberto Murolo
ms AI 77346	1974	Franca Mazzola	Eh già ma tu sei grande
ms AI 77354	1974	La Strana Società	Fai tornare il sole
ms AI 77357	1974	Nanni Svampa e Lino Patruno	Pellegrin che vai a Roma
ms AI 77359	1974	Wess & Dori Ghezzi	Un corpo e un'anima
ms AI 77360	1975	Lapera	L'acqua purificatrice
ms AI 77361	1975	Mino Reitano	Dedicato a Frank
ms A 77365	1975	Augusto Righetti	The Guitar Sound of Augusto Righetti
ms AI 77366	1975	Sergio Centi	Er mejo parcoscenico der monno
ms AI 77370	1975	Wess & Dori Ghezzi	Terzo album
ms A 77373	1975	Santi Latora	Latin Soul
ms AI 77376	1976	Mino Reitano	Omaggio alla mia terra
ms AI 77382	1976	Wess & Dori Ghezzi	Amore bellissimo
ms AI 77384/385	1977	Gino Paoli	Il mio mestiere
ms AI 77388	1977	Mino Reitano	Sogno d'amore
ms AI 77399	1978	Vito Paradiso	Noi belli noi brutti
ms AI 77403	1978	Wess & Dori Ghezzi	In due
ms AI 77407	1979	Gli Alisei	Gli Alisei
ms AI 77408	1979	Camaleonti	...e camminiamo
ms AI 77409	1980	Mauro Macario	Amoropolis
ms AI 77419	1980	Remo Bartolomei	Novecentonovantanove storie in comune
ms AI 77421	30 April 1981	Autori vari (Mina, Franco Califano e altri)	Concerto grande per Napoli
ms AI 77422	1981	Umberto Cannone	Un'ora, un giorno
ms AI 77423	1981	Cristiano Malgioglio	Artigli
ms AI 77427	21 April 1982	Autori vari (Mina, Gino Paoli e altri)	Mistomare
ms AI 77429	1982	Aldo Donati	Cantando
ms AI 77436	1983	AA.VV.,	Le canzoni dei Puffi
ms AI 77444	1984	AA.VV.,	La banda dei Puffi
ms AI 77455	19 March 1985	Fiordaliso	Dal vivo per il mondo
ms AI 77467	1987	Shel Shapiro	Per amore della musica
ms AI 77470	1987	Fiordaliso	Fiordaliso
ms AI 77471	1987	Amedeo Minghi	Serenata

=== 45 rpm ===
==== Catalogazione Ld A ====
===== 50s =====
Catalogue No.	Year	Performer	Title
Ld A 6001	1955	Edoardo Lucchina e la sua Orchestra tipica	Amico Tango/Cielo azzurro
Ld A 6002	1955	Edoardo Lucchina e la sua Orchestra tipica	Cumparsita/Caminito
Ld A 6003	1955	Edoardo Lucchina e la sua Orchestra tipica	Plegaria/Argentinita
Ld A 6011	1955	Aurelio Fierro	'O Nzisto/Spatella 'argiento
Ld A 6028	1955	Edoardo Lucchina e la sua Orchestra tipica	On a bien l' temps d' pleurer/Soltanto tu
Ld A 6033	1 February 1956	Leonildo Marcheselli	La Mattchiche/La Violetta
Ld A 6041	1956	Aurelio Fierro	La vita è un Paradiso di bugie/Nota per nota
Ld A 6046	1956	Marino Marini e il suo quartetto	Rico Vacilon/Sweet and gentle (Adele)
Ld A 6057	1956	Marino Marini e il suo quartetto	Pesca Pascà/Seven lonely days
Ld A 6064	1956	Tullio Mobiglia e i suoi solisti, canta Flo Sandon's (lato A)	I want you to be my baby/Burn that candle
Ld A 6070	1956	Edoardo Lucchina e la sua Orchestra tipica	Vogliamoci tanto bene/Hernando's Hideaway
Ld A 6075	1957	Aurelio Fierro	Corde della mia chitarra/Usignolo
Ld A 6086	1957	Marino Marini	Luna lunatica/Che c'è Conce'?
Ld A 6102	1957	Aurelio Fierro	Lazzarella/Napule, sole mio!
Ld A 6112	1957	Marino Marini e il suo quartetto	Don Ciccio 'o piscatore/Mariantò
Ld A 6133	1957	Bruno Martelli e la sua Orchestra tipica	Coplas/Limon Limonero
Ld A 6134	1957	Bruno Martelli e la sua Orchestra tipica	El Relicario/Mi Jaca
Ld A 6135	1957	Bruno Martelli e la sua Orchestra tipica	El Carretero/El Picador
Ld A 6136	1957	Bruno Martelli e la sua Orchestra tipica	Lady of Spain/Toledo
Ld A 6137	1957	Quartetto Folkloristico Leonildo Marcheselli	Amarezza/Canta niño
Ld A 6143	1957	Flo Sandon's e Quartetto Radar	Ave Maria No Morro/Star-O
Ld A 6152	1957	Aurelio Fierro	Come pioveva/Signorinella
Ld A 6153	1957	Aurelio Fierro	Parlami d'amore Mariù/La canzone dell'amore
Ld A 6154	1957	Aurelio Fierro	Miniera/Il tango delle capinere
Ld A 6156	1957	Mario Pezzotta	Wabash blues/Boogie mood
Ld A 6167	1957	Flo Sandon's col Quartetto Radar	Piccolissima serenata/Tipitipitipso
Ld A 6176	1957	Flo Sandon's col Quartetto Radar (lato A)/Quartetto Radar (lato B)	Mama Guitar/O.K. Corral
Ld A 6197	1958	Mario Pezzotta	Fascination/Around The World
Ld A 6202	1958	Quartetto Radar	I trulli di Alberobello/Campane di santa Lucia
Ld A 6203	1958	Nella Colombo	L'edera/Mille volte
Ld A 6204	1958	Nella Colombo	Arsura/E' molto facile dirsi addio
Ld A 6209	1958	Aurelio Fierro	La canzone che piace a te/Timida serenata
Ld A 6211	1958	Aurelio Fierro	Giuro d'amarti così/I trulli di Alberobello
Ld A 6214	1958	Edoardo Lucchina	Nel blu dipinto di blu/Timida serenatae
Ld A 6215	1958	Edoardo Lucchina	Fragole e cappellini/La canzone che piace a te
Ld A 6216	1958	Edoardo Lucchina	L'edera/Giuro d'amarti così
Ld A 6217	1958	Edoardo Lucchina	Chitarra romana/Tango del mare
Ld A 6223	1958	Marino Marini e il suo quartetto	Nel blu dipinto di blu/Bebè
Ld A 6229	1958	Flo Sandon's	Tani/Galopera
Ld A 6231	1958	Flo Sandon's	Bewitched/Come prima
Ld A 6234	1958	Aurelio Fierro	Tango del mare/Reginella campagnola
Ld A 6255	1958	Aurelio Fierro	Calypso melody/Calypso italiano
Ld A 6258	1958	Roberto Murolo	Lacreme napulitane/'a casciaforte
Ld A 6273	1958	Aurelio Fierro	Rosì' tu sei l'ammore/Vurria
Ld A 6275	1958	Aurelio Fierro	Giulietta... e Romeo/Sincerità
Ld A 6276	1958	Aurelio Fierro	Tuppe, tuppe, Mariscia'/Torna a vuca'
Ld A 6300	1958	Luciano Sangiorgi	Passione/Nun me scetà
Ld A 6301	16 giugno 1958	Luciano Sangiorgi	Anema e core/Luna rossa
Ld A 6302	1958	Luciano Sangiorgi	'Nu quarto 'e luna/Aggio perduto 'o suonno
Ld A 6312	6 giugno 1958	Marino Marini e il suo quartetto (canta Ruggero Cori)	Peppenella/Povera chitarrella
Ld A 6317	1958	Edoardo Lucchina e i suoi solisti, canta Louis Binder	Arrivederci stasera/Perry Como sorride e fa...
Ld A 6318	1958	Flo Sandon's	Pica y ripica/Canzone gitana
Ld A 6319	23 luglio 1958	Aurelio Fierro	Fili d'oro/Addio signora
Ld A 6320	1958	Aurelio Fierro	Amor di pastorello/Cara piccina
Ld A 6321	1958	Aurelio Fierro	Le rose rosse/Torna al paesello
Ld A 6322	1958	Aurelio Fierro	Capinera/Reginella
Ld A 6324	1958	Mario Pezzotta	Le tue mani/Solitudine
Ld A 6326	1958	Bruno Quirinetta	Voga cocola/El ganser
Ld A 6331	1958	Roberto Murolo	' o mare 'e Margellina/Marechiaro
Ld A 6363	1958	Gianni Marzocchi	Cercavo una donna/Julia
Ld A 6364	1958	Gianni Marzocchi	Ritorna a me/Silenzioso amore
Ld A 6365	1958	Gianni Marzocchi	Mi addormento con te/Buenas dias, Maria
Ld A 6369	1958	Aurelio Fierro	Canti nuovi/Stornelli dell'aviatore
Ld A 6370	1958	Roberto Murolo	Maria Mari/Era di maggio
Ld A 6378	1958	Luciano Sangiorgi	Sabre Dance/Honky Tonk Train Blues
Ld A 6379	10 settembre 1958	Luciano Sangiorgi	Peanut vendor (Il venditore di noccioline)/Manhattan Square Dance
Ld A 6380	1958	Luciano Sangiorgi	Melancolie/Giochi proibiti
Ld A 6381	1958	Luciano Sangiorgi	Delicado/Domino
Ld A 6392	1958	Aurelio Fierro	Me so 'mparato a scrivere/Calypso Ninna Nanna
Ld A 6394	1958	Germana Caroli	Magic Moments/Non partir
Ld M 6407	25 ottobre 1958	Giuseppe Marzari	'O sciò Ballestrero/Signori biglietto
Ld A 6412	1958	Roberto Murolo	Dicitencello vuje/Vierno
Ld A 6413	1958	Roberto Murolo	Dduje paravise/Primma siconda e terza
Ld A 6416	1958	Aurelio Fierro	Spazzacamino/Lucciole vagabonde
Ld A 6417	1958	Aurelio Fierro	Ivonne/Abat-jour
Ld A 6427	17 novembre 1958	Gianni Marzocchi	Tu lo sai/Ti manderò una bambola
Ld A 6429	1958	Coro del C.A.I. di Padova	Les Montagnards/La Bergere Des Aravis
Ld A 6442	1958	Quartetto Radar	Torero/Simpatica
Ld A 6455	1958	Roberto Murolo	La cammesella/Te voglio bene assaje
Ld A 6461	1959	Flo Sandon's	Arrivederci/Il tuo sorriso
Ld A 6464	1958	Edoardo Lucchina	Ciribiribin / La spagnola
Ld A 6469	1958	Germana Caroli	Da te era bello restar/Ehi tu
Ld A 6470	1958	Gianni Marzocchi	Per un bacio d'amor/Quartiere dei lillà
Ld A 6476	1959	Germana Caroli	Un bacio sulla bocca/Nessuno
Ld A 6477	19 gennaio 1959	Flo Sandon's	Ma baciami/Conoscerti
Ld A 6479	1959	Gianni Marzocchi	Sempre con te/La luna è un'altra luna
Ld A 6480	1959	Gianni Marzocchi	Così... così.../Adorami
Ld A 6510	24 febbraio 1959	Germana Caroli	Dance, darling, dance/Ti prego amore
Ld A 6521	1959	Flo Sandon's	Cercando l'amore/Kiss me
Ld A 6522	1959	Flo Sandon's	Non dimenticar (T'ho voluto bene)/Un po' di cielo
Ld A 6529	1959	Bruno Quirinetta	Al bazaar delle trombette/Tre nei
Ld A 6533	1959	Gianni Marzocchi	Notte, lunga notte/Com'è bello
Ld A 6561	1959	Dante Perduca	Una lacrima negli occhi/Tango d'amore
Ld A 6562	1959	Germana Caroli	Petite fleur/D'improvviso
Ld A 6563	1959	Germana Caroli	D'improvviso/Venus
Ld A 6565	1959	Gianni Marzocchi	Nebbia/Cantar... (io voglio cantar)
Ld A 6566	1959	Gianni Marzocchi	Noi siamo/Le ore
Ld A 6567	1959	Gianni Marzocchi	Padrone d''o mare/Stella furastiera
Ld A 6568	1959	Gianni Marzocchi	'A rosa rosa/Si' tu!
Ld A 6570	1959	Germana Caroli	Passiuncella/'O destino 'e ll'ate
Ld A 6582	1959	Dante Perduca	I tre spagnoli/La danza della formica
Ld A 6608	1959	Flo Sandon's	Guarda che luna/Labbra di fuoco
Ld A 6625	29 luglio 1959	Flo Sandon's	Concertino/La strada dell'amore (The Street of love)
Ld A 6634	1959	Quartetto Folkloristico Leonildo Marcheselli	Mazurca n.1/Rosaura
Ld A 6642	1959	Mario Pezzotta	Felicidade/La Canzone di Orfeo
Ld A 6646	1959	Bruno Quirinetta	Pobre luna/Oieme mamà
Ld A 6647	1959	Gianni Marzocchi	Nuvola per due/Nu' t'add'avé 'nisciuno
Ld A 6648	1959	Gianni Marzocchi	Diamoci del tu/Amorevole
Ld A 6651	1959	Germana Caroli	Come softly to me (Vieni dolcemente a me)/Cin Cin
Ld A 6652	1959	Flo Sandon's	Faded orchid (Cercando l'amore)/La fine
Ld A 6662	8 luglio 1959	Flo Sandon's	Labbra di fuoco/Buondì
Ld A 6677	1959	Aurelio Fierro	Invocazione a Maria Ss.dell'Incoronata di Puglia - 1ª parte/2ª parte
Ld A 6679	1959	Marino Marini	Sei bella/Marina
Ld A 6681	1959	Marino Marini	Lisbona mia/Un telegramma
Ld A 6709	1959	Mario Pezzotta	E' Charleston/King of rags
Ld A 6710	1959	Mario Pezzotta	Charleston/Yes sir....(Lola)
Ld A 6716	28 novembre 1959	Edoardo Lucchina e la sua Orchestra	Flamenco/Kriminal tango
Ld A 6720	1959	Marino Marini	I Sing "Ammore"/Ritroviamoci
Ld A 6721	1959	Marino Marini	Maria Maddalena/Kriminal tango
Ld A 6730	1959	Germana Caroli	Rubare/Por dos besos
Ld A 6731	1959	Fausto Papetti	Estate violenta/Mio impossibile amore
Ld A 6732	1959	Flo Sandon's	Non piango per te/Mille volte si
Ld A 6733	22 dicembre 1959	Little Tony & his brothers	Foxy little mama/Too good

===== 60s =====
Catalogue No.	Year	Performer	Title
Ld A 6738	1960	Germana Caroli	Gridare di gioia/Amore senza sole
Ld A 6740	1960	Aurelio Fierro	Libero/Il mare
Ld A 6741	1960	Aurelio Fierro	Romantica/Vento, pioggia e scarpe rotte
Ld A 6742	1960	Sergio Franchi	Perdoniamoci/Splende l'arcobaleno
Ld A 6743	1960	Sergio Franchi	Perderti/Splende il sole
Ld A 6744	1960	Gianni Marzocchi	Notte mia/Amore, abisso dolce
Ld A 6746	1960	Marino Marini e il suo quartetto	Libero/Notte mia
Ld A 6747	1960	Marino Marini	Romantica/È vero
Ld A 6749	1960	Edoardo Lucchina	Quando vien la sera/Invoco te
Ld A 6762	1960	Gianni Marzocchi	Jessica/Piangere un po'
Ld A 6772	1960	Clem Sacco	Vedo/Se tu mi baci
Ld A 6773	1960	Clem Sacco	Forse forse più/Basta
Ld A 6777	1960	Gianni Marzocchi	Nata per essere adorata/Come una bambola
Ld A 6788	1960	Marino Marini e il suo quartetto	Oh, oh, Rosy/Luna napoletana
Ld A 6789	1960	Marino Marini e il suo quartetto	Abbracciami/Ciao Porto
Ld A 6790	1960	Marino Marini e il suo quartetto	Tintarella di luna/Quando vien la sera
Ld A 6791	1960	Marino Marini e il suo quartetto	Mustafà/Lasciate star la luna
Ld A 6792	1960	Fausto Papetti	La dolce vita/Parlami di me
Ld A 6793	1960	Fausto Papetti	Till/Mare incantato
Ld A 6793	1960	Little Tony	Princess/I love you
Ld A 6795	1960	Fausto Papetti	Scandalo al sole/Morgen
Ld A 6798	1960	Aurelio Fierro	Maria Marì/Napule ca se ne va
Ld A 6806	1960	Rino Salviati	Galopera/Tres Palabras
Ld A 6807	1960	Clem Sacco	Paura/Bevo
Ld A 6808	1960	Clem Sacco	Non temere/Non mi lasciare
Ld A 6819	1960	Gianni Marzocchi	Please, non lasciarmi/Eccoti
Ld A 6822	1960	Aurelio Fierro	Uè uè, che femmena/Sti 'mmane...
Ld A 6832	1960	Flo Sandon's e il quartetto di Marino Marini	Serenata a Margellina/'Sti mmane
Ld A 6863	1960	Fausto Papetti	Cheek to cheek/Ebb tide
Ld M 6881	1960	Fausto Papetti	Il nostro concerto/Cinzia
Ld A 6886	1960	Flo Sandon's	O mein Papà/La mamma e il treno
Ld A 6887	1960	Little Tony	Che tipo rock/Addio mio amore
Ld A 6888	1960	Little Tony	Sweet dreams/La bella
Ld A 6891	1960	Flo Sandon's e il Quartetto Vocal Comet	Un paradiso da vendere/Implorarti
Ld A 6893	1960	Flo Sandon's	Domenica è sempre domenica/Non so dir (ti voglio bene)
Ld A 6901	1960	Germana Caroli	Luna, Lina e brezzolina/Di' la tua
Ld A 6902	1960	Fausto Papetti	Nessuno al mondo/Too much tequila
Ld A 6903	1960	Fausto Papetti	Words/Le bonheur
Ld A 6904	1960	Marino Marini ed il suo quartetto	Les enfants du Pirée (Uno a me ed uno a te)/Gridalo al mondo
Ld A 6912	1960	Gianni Marzocchi	Il cielo in una stanza/Plenilunio
Ld A 6913	1960	Clem Sacco	Corriamoci incontro/Vino chitarra e luna
Ld A 6929	1960	Flo Sandon's	Cha cha cha per gli innamorati/Poquito no
Ld A 6930	1960	Flo Sandon's	Veleno biondo/Notte d'amore
Ld A 6931	1960	Marino Marini ed il suo quartetto	Era scritto nel cielo/T'amerò dolcemente
Ld A 6940	1960	Aurelio Fierro	Paese mio/Nu vasillo a pezzechillo
Ld A 6941	1960	Edoardo Lucchini ed il suo quintetto	amaro tango / tango assassino
Ld A 6944	1960	Flo Sandon's	Pupazzetti/Vorrei volare (2° Zecchino d'Oro - Salone del Bambino 1960)
Ld A 6946	1960	Little Tony	No, no mai/Che tipo rock
Ld A 6953	1960	Germana Caroli	Alle 10 della sera/Diavolo
Ld A 6955	1960	Fausto Papetti	What a sky/Noi due sconosciuti
Ld A 6958	1960	Carlo Mauri ed il suo quintetto, cantante solista: Cicero	Vicino a te/Dammi la mano e corri
Ld A 6974	1961	Little Tony	24 mila baci/Patatina
Ld A 6976	1961	Germana Caroli	Le mille bolle blu/Che brivido ragazzi
Ld A 6977	1961	Clem Sacco (sul lato A)/Marisa Rampin (sul lato B)	Carolina dai/Libellule
Ld A 6980	1961	Flo Sandon's	Non mi dire chi sei/Mare di dicembre
Ld A 6981	1961	Flo Sandon's	Al di là/Una goccia di cielo
Ld A 6984	1961	Marino Marini ed il suo quartetto	Maschere maschere maschere/Un'ora sena te
Ld A 6988	1961	Clem Sacco	Carolina dai/Basta
Ld A 6993	1961	Adriana Lima	Pepe/Un'ora senza te
Ld A 6995	1961	Clem Sacco	Ti è passato il nervoso?/Baba al mama
Ld A 7000	1961	Quartetto Folkloristico Leonildo Marcheselli	Las Noches/Bonita
Ld A 7004	1961	Gianni Marzocchi	Le case/Un prato quadrato
Ld A 7005	1961	Flo Sandon's	Che sensazione/Ho creduto
Ld A 7006	1961	Little Tony	Perché m'hai fatto innamorare?/Bella Marie
Ld A 7013	1961	Sergio Franchi	Se due sguardi s'incontrano/Saprò che sei tu
Ld A 7014	1961	Adriana Lima (sul lato A)/Guidone (sul lato B)	Autentico tzigano/Amo una bambina
Ld A 7015	1961	Clem Sacco (sul lato A)/Marisa Rampin (sul lato B)	Enea con il neo/L'8 volante
Ld A 7017	1961	Edoardo Lucchina, fisarmonica solista e ritmi	Un tango cha cha cha/Tango vigliacco
Ld A 7022	1961	Tullio Mobiglia	Avventure di Capri/Italian Serenade
Ld A 7023	1961	Tullio Mobiglia	''O sole mio/maria Mar'
Ld A 7024	1961	Tullio Mobiglia	Piccola/Do-re-mi cantare
Ld A 7025	1961	Tullio Mobiglia	Carolina dai!/Rosina
Ld A 7026	1961	Marino Marini	Calcutta (io parto per Calcutta)/Non sei mai stata così bella
Ld A 7027	1961	Marino Marini	Sei bella/Un'ora senza te
Ld A 7030	1961	Achille Togliani	Mentre sogno di te/L'immensità
Ld A 7032	1961	Flo Sandon's	Dimmelo in Settembre/La gente ci guarda
Ld A 7039	1961	Loredana	T'incontrerò/Scusa, scusa, scusami
Ld A 7051	1961	Aurelio Fierro	Cielo!/'o tesoro
Ld A 7053	1961	Achille Togliani	Pecchè te sto vicino/E aspetto a tte
Ld M 7057	30 giugno 1961	Fausto Papetti	Legata a un granello di sabbia/Tu che mi hai preso il cuor
Ld A 7060	1961	Little Tony	Non ce la farò/Grazia
Ld A 7073	1961	Fausto Papetti	The blob/Vento caldo
Ld A 7076	1961	Aurelio Fierro	'o cunfessore/Tutta 'a famiglia
Ld A 7079	7 novembre 1961	Flo Sandon's	L'altalena/La canzone dei poeti
Ld A 7080	1961	Clem Sacco	Oh mama voglio l'uovo a la cocque/È nato l'amor
Ld A 7082	1961	Germana Caroli	Che noia!/Faccia di bronzo
Ld A 7083	1961	Little Tony	Italian Lover/Pony Time
Ld A 7084	1961	Aurelio Fierro	Povero Masaniello/T'aspetto tutt''e ssere
Ld A 7107	1961	Achille Togliani	Buon natale all'italiana/E' natale
Ld A 7108	1961	Achille Togliani	La mia donna/Naufrago d'amore
Ld A 7115	1961	Marisa Rampin	Mi te baso ti/Se ciama amor
Ld A 7119	1961	Fausto Papetti	Torna a settembre/Kon tiki
Ld A 7120	1961	Fausto Papetti	La novia/Fantasy in slow
Ld A 7126	1961	Marino Marini	Moliendo Cafè/Rosita cha cha cha
Ld A 7128	1961	Fausto Papetti	Midnight twist/Twist twist
Ld A 7129	1961	Fausto Papetti	Wheels/Controluce
Ld A 7130	1961	Fausto Papetti	Canto d'amore indiano/Flamingo
Ld A 7135	19 dicembre 1961	Edoardo Lucchina	Adios Pampa mia/A media luz
Ld A 7143	1962	Aurelio Fierro	Chiesetta alpina/Fontane
Ld A 7144	1962	Aurelio Fierro	Lui andava a cavallo/Cipria di sole
Ld A 7145	1962	Flo Sandon's	Prima del Paradiso/Passa il tempo
Ld A 7146	1962	Marisa Rampin	Conta le stelle/Gondolì Gondolà
Ld A 7147	1962	Fausto Papetti	Midnight twist/Torna a settembre
Ld M 7149	1962	Edoardo Lucchina	Señora/Passione Romagnola
Ld A 7170	1962	Marino Marini	Irena/Caterina
Ld A 7178	1962	Wera Nepy	Ferma questa notte/Perché non torni
Ld A 7183	1962	Marino Marini	Caffettiera twist/Mille luci
Ld A 7184	17 maggio 1962	Marino Marini e il suo quartetto	Esperanza/Poco pelo
Ld A 7189	7 giugno 1962	Flo Sandon's	Ferma questa notte (Retiens la nuit)/Mai più potrò scordare
Ld A 7191	1962	Marisa Rampin	Tango e poncho/Cin cin cin
Ld A 7194	26 maggio 1962	Aurelio Fierro	Ciondolo d'or/Ladra
Ld A 7197	1962	Fausto Papetti	Amado mio/Perfidia
Ld A 7198	1962	Fausto Papetti	Tuff/Stranger on the shore (E' lei)
Ld A 7202	1962	Ettore Cenci guitar trio	Afrikaan beat/Peace pipe
Ld A 7212	1962	Fausto Papetti	The madison/Canadian madison
Ld A 7216	1962	Ettore Cenci	Speedy Gonzales/Persian twist
Ld A 7217	1962	Fausto Papetti	Cercami/La vela bianca
Ld A 7223	1962	Little Tony	Lo sai tu?/Il ragazzo col ciuffo
Ld A 7224	1962	Clem Sacco	Fiammiferi accesi/Twist di mezzanotte
Ld A 7245	12 novembre 1962	Flo Sandon's	Ninna nanna ad un angelo/Regalami il tuo cuore
Ld A 7252	1962	Rino Salviati	Puente de Piedra/Senor Eterno io
Ld A 7254	1962	Fausto Papetti	Together/Yemptation
Ld A 7255	1962	Fausto Papetti	September in the rain/Star dust
Ld A 7267	1963	Marino Marini e il suo quartetto (canta Vito Benvenuti)	Baciami stasera/Tre lunghi baci
Ld A 7275	1963	Loredana sul lato A / Franco Pisano e la sua Orchestra sul lato B	Qualche nota e poi/Bossanova Guitar
Ld A 7281	1963	Marino Marini e il suo quartetto	Non ha più luce il mondo/Tel Aviv
Ld A 7284	1963	Fausto Papetti	Ricorda/Finirà così
Ld A 7285	1963	Fausto Papetti	Quando ritornerà da me/Lawrence of Arabia
Ld A 7293	1963	Ettore Cenci guitar trio	Vento caldissimo/Que no, que no
Ld A 7301	1963	Giobatta	Il marciapiede/Il vagabondo
Ld A 7302	1963	Fausto Papetti	Broken date/Sherry
Ld A 7303	17 giugno 1963	Fausto Papetti	Sole spento/Sapore di miele
Ld A 7308	1963	Loredana	Non fai per me/Il ragazzo dirimpetto
Ld A 7309	1963	I Fratelli Colwell	Ballata di Cristoforo Colombo/Lassa fa...ai milanes
Ld A 7310	1963	I Fratelli Colwell	Napoli terra bella/Evviva Bari!
Ld A 7313	1963	Gianfranco Intra	Dolce vivere/Ada mia
Ld A 7318	1963	Fausto Papetti	55 giorni a Pechino/Te amo te amo te amo
Ld A 7319	1963	Achille Togliani	Canta Pierrot/Ninnolo
Ld M 7324	1963	Ettore Cenci	Hully Gully Time/Wini Wini
Ld A 7327	1963	Little Tony	T'amo e t'amerò/Tu sei cambiata
Ld A 7330	1963	Fausto Papetti	Lisa/Pa-ba
Ld A 7335	1963	Marino Marini e il suo quartetto	Buon Natale/Paperina
Ld A 7338	1963	Fausto Papetti	Roma nun fa' la stupida stasera/Ciumachella de Trastevere
Ld A 7337	1963	Ettore Cenci guitar trio	Christine/Please please me
Ld A 7339	1963	Fausto Papetti	Maria Elena/Non papà
Ld A 7350	1964	Little Tony	Quando vedrai la mia ragazza/Ti cambierò con una meglio di te
Ld A 7361	1964	Enrico Pianori	Ombre della mia stanza/Se fu amore
Ld A 7363	1964	Antonio Cocco	Se mi volessi bene/La morte dell'amore
Ld A 7365	1964	Fausto Papetti	L'amore va/Un'altra volta
Ld A 7367	1964	Loredana	Provaci/Lo sport
Ld A 7370	1964	Little Tony	Non aspetto nessuno/La fine di agosto
Ld A 7371	31 marzo 1964	Marino Marini	Bella bionda/Il surf che piace a me
Ld A 7372	1964	Enrico Pianori	Babà champagne/Un bossanova con te
Ld A 7376	1964	Fausto Papetti	Hello, Dolly!/Riflessi nell'acqua
Ld A 7377	1964	Fausto Papetti	Mare d'estate/Washington square
Ld A 7389	1964	Marino Marini	Ho capito che ti amo/Mi sento stupido
Ld A 7391	26 ottobre 1964	Fausto Papetti	Angelita di Anzio/In ginocchio da te
Ld A 7392	1964	Franco Vicini	Anche se mi fai paura/Chi non sa donare
Ld Al 7398	1964	Roberto Murolo	'a nuvena/Dduje paravise
Ld A 7428	1965	Little Tony	Viene la notte/Fingerò di crederti
Ld A 7459	1965	Rino Salviati	Prigioniero di un sogno/Primo amore
Ld A 7463	1966	Franco Vicini e la sua orchestra	La lunga strada/Tanto mi fai male
Ld A 7464	1966	Tony e Nelly	Sarà lunedì/Quando l'amore muore
Ld A 7472	1966	Little Tony	Riderà/Il mio amore con Giulia
Ld A 7483	1966	Tony e Nelly	Ma sto pagando/La strada che porta a te
Ld A 7484	1966	Nelly Fioramonti	E' l'amore/Saluta la tua donna
Ld A 7494	1º novembre 1966	I Balordi	Vengono a portarci via, ah ah!/Don Chisciotte
Ld A 7495	Novembre 1966	Piermaurizio	Acqua sporca/Voltati
Ld A 7499	Dicembre 1966	Guido Russo	Mister Blue/La città povera
Ld A 7500	1967	Little Tony	Cuore matto/Gente che mi parla di te
Ld A 7506	1967	Totò Savio & The Shamrocks	Cuore matto/Nelle mie tasche
Ld A 7507	1967	Ettore Cenci	Delicado/L'innominato
Ld A 7508	1967	Tony e Nelly	La strada nel sole/Vieni
Ld A 7509	1967	Nelly Fioramonti	Buono come te/Il fiore non si regala più
Ld A 7515	1967	Little Tony	Peggio per me/Qui la gente sa vivere
Ld A 7516	11 aprile 1967	I Balordi	Domani devo fare una cosa/Buona fortuna
Ld A 7525	5 luglio 1967	I Balordi	'O matusa/'A cammesella
Ld A 7529	1967	Guido Russo	Il freddo/Amore, eccetera
Ld A 7535	1967	Marcello Minerbi	Io ti amo, tu mi ami.../La chanson de Yohann
Ld A 7536	1967	Fausto Papetti	Ode to Billie Joe/San Francisco
Ld A 7538	1967	I Balordi	Non è Francesca/Guardando te
Ld A 7544	1968	Ingrid Schoeller	Se cerchi amore/Se passerai di qui
Ld A 7551	1968	Udo Jürgens	Per vivere/Ridendo vai
Ld A 7559	1968	Leo Ragano	Pioggia 'e sole/Tu non me può scurdà
Ld A 7571	1968	I Pyrañas	Cara Judy ciao!/Stay
Ld A 7572	1968	I Black Birds	Dolce Delilah (Dear Delilah)/Torna verso il Sole
Ld A 7574	1968	Rino Salviati	Tristezze/Sogno d'amore
Ld A 7575	1968	Rino Salviati	Serenata ad un angelo/Bambina innamorata
Ld A 7587	1968	Enzo Mana	Queste lacrime/No, non importa
Ld A 7588	1968	Barbara Bella	Quando l'amore chiama/Solo poco sole
Ld A 7589	1968	Aura D'Angelo	La ricchezza/Questa è la verità
Ld A 7598	1968	Trio Athénée	Aurevoir Paris/Casa mia
Ld A 7601	Novembre 1968	Roberto Vecchioni	La pioggia e il parco/Un disco scelto a caso
Ld A 7605	Dicembre 1968	Margherita	L'acqua ci copre/Il ragazzo del cuore
Ld A 7606	16 dicembre 1968	Dori Ghezzi	Casatschok/Per un anno che se ne va
Ld A 7608	1968	Ettore Cenci guitar	Serenata/Valzer triste
Ld A 7610	1969	Loretta Goggi	Fino all'ultimo/Scusa se insisto
Ld A 7617	1969	Monica Riva	Gelosia/Il primo disco
Ld A 7618	1969	Rosanna Negri	Quel giorno d'illusione/Il calendario
Ld A 7625	1969	Little Tony	Bada bambina/Era febbraio
Ld A 7630	1969	Guido Russo	La mia vita/Se muore una rosa
Ld A 7631	1969	Little Tony	Solo per te/Che male t'ho fatto
Ld A 7635	4 giugno 1969	Fausto Papetti	Time is tight/First of may
Ld A 7636	1969	Augusto Righetti	Atlantis/L'amore giusto
Ld A 7644	1969	Mirna Doris	Preghiera a 'na mamma/Estate addio!
Ld A 7645	1969	Jimmy	Il prezzo della verità/Sono senza te
Ld A 7646	1969	Dori Ghezzi	La mia festa/Fiori sul soffitto
Ld A 7651	1969	Udo Jurgens	Stagione/Se tu sapessi
Ld A 7656	1969	Umberto Napolitano	A Laura/Inverno
Ld A 7657	1969	Sara Simone	Giorno per giorno/In cerca di te
Ld A 7658	1969	Chriss and the Stroke	Per niente al mondo/Torno in Russia
Ld A 7659	1969	Fabienne	Prima ballerina/Mai senza te

===== 70s =====
Catalogue No.	Year	Performer	Title
Ld A 7668	1970	Dori Ghezzi	Occhi a mandorla/Un bacio no due baci no
Ld A 7671	1970	Loretta Goggi	Cibù Cibà/Due ragazzi
Ld A 7678	1970	Dori Ghezzi	Quello là/Ma che strano tipo
Ld A 7685	1970	Vince Tempera e la macchina del piacere	Ballad of easy rider/The Pleasure Machine
Ld A 7688	1970	Umberto Napolitano	Fiori sul davanzale/Ragazza innamorata
Ld A 7694	1971	Quel pazzo mondo	Canzone mia/Brava Maria
Ld A 7701	1971	Chriss and the Stroke	Lei/Un sorriso
Ld A 7704	1971	I Sognatori	Un solo sogno/Tu sei bella
Ld A 7708	1971	Elide Suligoj	La chitarra/Dolce amore non piangere
Ld A 7709	1971	Loretta Goggi	i chiedo scusa/Per favore
Ld A 7710	1971	Mino Reitano	La pura verità/Una ferita in fondo al cuore
Ld A 7712	4 marzo 1971	Nanni Svampa & Lino Patruno	Coccodì coccodà (il gallo è morto)/Socialista che va a Roma
Ld A 7714	1971	Gisella Pagano	Buon riposo amore/Ti lasci andare
Ld A 7717	1971	Mino Reitano	La leggenda di Tara Poki/E si... vado avanti così
Ld A 7719	1971	Alberto Anelli	Mezzanotte/Sabato
Ld A 7732	1971	Rinaldo Ebasta	Libertà/Ero io eri tu
Ld A 7735	1971	Gino Paoli	Con chi fai l'amore Mimì/Mamma mia
Ld A 7743	1971	Quel Pazzo Mondo	Questa bambolina di guai/Catene nuove
Ld A 7749	1972	Umberto Napolitano	La prima volta/Il viaggio
Ld A 7754	1972	Gino Paoli	Non si vive in silenzio/Amare per vivere
Ld A 7756	1972	Franco I	Vicolo di campagna/Malinconia di te
Ld A 7757	1972	Dori Ghezzi	Ma chi è che cos'è/Uomo uomo
Ld A 7763	1972	Fojetta	L'ascesa/Il corno rosso
Ld A 7779	1972	Franca Mazzola	Che resta ormai di noi/L'ultimo bar
Ld A 7781	1972	Nanni Svampa, Lino Patruno e Franca Mazzola	L'albero prigioniero/Viva la rosa
Ld A 7798	1973	Marcello Gerani	Alla fine del mondo/Vivere o morire
Ld A 7820	1973	I Choppers	Nel villaggio dell'amore/Se fossi nato povero
Ld A 7826	1973	Dori Ghezzi	Adamo ed Eva/Non ci contavo più
Ld A 7846	1974	La Strana Società	Fai tornare il sole/Quanti passi!
Ld A 7860	1974	Beppe Berto	Uomo di mare/La casa la mucca il mare
Ld A 7873	1974	Mino Reitano	Dolce angelo/Key
Ld A 7879	1975	La Strana Società	Una manciata di sabbia/Per carità
Ld A 7882	1975	Gino Paoli	La ragazza senza nome/È facile amarti
Ld A 7892	1975	Mino Reitano	Terre lontane/Profumi d'amore
Ld A 7896	1975	La Strana Società	Cucciolo di donna/Ma che ragione hai
Ld A 7898	1975	Augusto Righetti Group	Ramaya/Wendy
Ld A 7901	1975	Elena Reda	Ti voglio/Che farai
Ld A 7911	1976	La Strana Società	Andiamo via/Ma che ragione hai
Ld A 7913	1976	Umberto Bindi	Io e il mare/Flash
Ld A 7914	1976	Alberto Rota	Annalisa/Caterina del mio cuor
Ld A 7921	1976	I Sogni Proibiti	Oggi sono tanto triste/Il gioco
Ld A 7932	1976	Neapolis	Silenzio cantatore/Bella mia
Ld A 7936	1976	Marie Laure	Calore/Live to love
Ld A 7938	1976	Le Dolci Armonie	Tu/Pallida luna
Ld A 7946	1976	Mino Reitano	Sogno/Tu, dolcemente
Ld A 7950	1976	Junie Russo	Mai/Che mi succede adesso
Ld A 7958	1977	La Strana Società	Tesoro mio/Bella bellissima
Ld Al 7965	1977	Gli Alisei	L'amore non ha età/Emigrazione
Ld Al 7970	1977	Franco Marino	Sì/Strano grande amore
Ld A 7981	1977	Gino Paoli	67 parole d'amore/Madama malinconia
Ld AI 7986	1977	Cristine Renà	Elvis/Senso
Ld A 7990	1977	Nanni Svampa	Lombardia/Tucci dì
Ld A 7995	1977	Tony Cucchiara (sul lato A) / Orchestra Cicci Santucci (sul lato B)	Il sognatore/Il sognatore (strum.)
Ld A 8001	14 aprile 1978	Gli Opera	Re Salomone/Aria, acqua, terra e fuoco
Ld A 8009	1978	Claudio Daiano	Sballo/Non mi sparo più
Ld A 8015	1978	Camaleonti	Canto d'amore straniero/Successo
Ld Al 8018	1978	Gloria Piedimonte	Ping Pong Space/Ping Pong Space (Instrumental Version)
Ld Al 8029	1978	Joe Alaria	Sai che ti dico ma vaff.../Voulez vous banana
Ld A 8034	1979	Mauro Macario	Lolita/Signora d'argento
Ld A 8039	1979	Camaleonti	Quell'attimo in più/Marina
Ld A 8040	1979	Idea 2	She's a witch/Compagna
Ld Al 8044	1979	Gli Alisei	Cresce l'erba, nasce il sole/Piccola amante mia

===== 80s =====
Catalogue No.	Year	Performer	Title
Ld A 8061	1980	Carlo Lena	Elisabetta/La mano, il segno, l'amore
Ld A 8062	1980	Erminio Macario	Ciao nonnino/Indovina, indovinello
Ld A 8066	1980	Idea 2	Anna Lee/Tra il dire e il fare
Ld Al 8072	1979	Tullio Solenghi	L'ispettore Cocker/Noi lo chiamiano Nat
Ld A 8073	1979	Camaleonti	E camminiamo/Ho scelto lei
Ld A 8076	1980	Daniela Bertoli	Siamo/Grazie tante
Ld A 8083	1980	Franco Fasano	Mi piaci tu/Sarai mia
Ld A 8084	1980	Edoardo De Angelis	Una storia americana/Ramirez
Ld AI 8097	1980	Roberto Fabiani	Mi mancherà/Viaggio
Ld Al 8101	1981	Momo Yang	Attimo magnifico/Che male c'è
Ld A 8115	1981	Gena Gas	Famme ballà (nun me scuccià)/Aria di burrasca
Ld A 8119	1981	Franco Fasano	Chewing gum/Esami di maturità
Ld Al 8120	1981	Alberto Corvino	Come è triste lasciare una donna/Sera
Ld A 8124	1981	Adriana Russo	Capriccio/Io, la pantera
Ld A 8125	1981	Roberta Rei	Non sparate sulla luna/Non dico che morirei ma è meglio quando ci sei
Ld Al 8129	1981	Maeva	Fotografia/Cuore spacca cuore
Ld AI 8138	1982	Little Tony	Donna da vendere/Trasparente
Ld AI 8139	1982	Gennaro Mambelli	Buona giornata/Lucy
Ld AI 8148	1982	Corrado	Carletto/Carletto (strumentale)
Ld Al 8152	1981	Maeva	Amore straniero/Manette blu
Ld A 8157	1982	Liana Orfei	Domani/Facile
Ld A 8158	1982	Rocco Reitano	Go, go, it's time to go!/Raffaella
Ld A 8190	1984	Enzo Malepasso & Fiordaliso	È bello dire anche ti amo/Parliamo
Ld Al 8201	1984	I Signori della Galassia	Mamma/Ed ora vai via
Ld Al 8209	1985	Giuseppe Cionfoli	Pronto Paradiso?/Ho visto un fiore
Ld Al 8214	1986	I Cavalieri del Re	Gigi la trottola/I Predatori del tempo
Ld Al 8215	1986	Bombolo	Bello de papà/Super Bombolo
Ld A 8224	1987	Amedeo Minghi	Anni '60/Nell'inverno
Ld A 8227	1987	Simon Luca con Alessandro Andrei, Franco Arese, Livio Berruti, Gelindo Bordin, Alberto Cova, Maurizio Damilano, Gabriella Dorio, Stefano Mei, Venanzio Ortis e Sara Simeoni	Traguardi (parte A)/Traguardi (parte B)

==== Circus - Catalogazione CN A ====
The Circus was a small label distributed by Durium; it was then acquired by the parent company, which continued to publish 45 rpms using the same catalogue number.

Catalogue No.	Year	Performer	Title
CN A 9001	1961	Jula de Palma	A.A.A. Adorabile cercasi/L'immensità
CN A 9002	1961	Jula de Palma	Patatina/Carolina dai!
CN A 9003	1961	Jula de Palma	Al di là/Non mi dire chi sei
CN M 9006	1961	Tania Raggi e Giorgio Onorato	Stornelli romaneschi a dispetto/Stornello cha cha cha
CN A 9011	1961	Anna Ranalli	Il pullover/Patatina
CN A 9015	1961	Raf Piccolo	Il gomitolo/Quanta gioia!
CN A 9019	1961	Johnny Mondo con l'orchestra di Edoardo Lucchina	Yuri rock/Cara Carolina
CN A 9020	1961	Tania Raggi (lato A)/Daniela Dani (lato B)	Siamo parte del cielo/Mai ho avuto un bacio
CN A 9024	1961	Marisa Terzi (sul lato A)/Anna Ranalli (sul lato B)	La pazza nel pozzo/Amore mio mao
CN A 9026	1961	Ugo Calise	Ti regalo la luna/Favole di pioggia
CN A 9036	1961	Giorgio Onorato	Lazio/Roma
CN A 9037	1961	Franco Latini	La bicicletta/Oh! Mariantonia
CN A 9038	1961	Silvio Bernini	Piccole cose/Un vetro appannato
CN A 9045	1962	The Big and The Mattacchions	Una mosca tse tse/Neapolitan twist
CN A 9048	1962	Franco Baldoni	I sogni muoiono all'alba/Deguello de amore
CN A 9052	1962	I Peos	Mazzarino/Balletti verdi
CN A 9053	1962	Jo Garsò	Caro/Accendi il motore
CN A 9055	1962	Jo Garsò	Se io potessi vivere/Oltre il muro
CN A 9057	1962	I Peos	Ferrovie, ferrovie.../Io vado in banca
CN A 9058	1962	Silvio Bernini	Luisa/Non c'è più niente
CN A 9060	1963	Rodolfo con il complesso di Marcello Minerbi	Chiaro di luna a Paullo/Il gattone deluso
CN A 9061	1963	Angelino con il complesso di Franco Cassano	La mia maestra/Mamma
CN A 9063	1963	I Peos	Valigie di cartone/La gente mormora
CN A 9068	1963	Enrico Ciacci and his guitar	White Christmas/Ave Maria
CN A 9072	1963	I Tre Amici	Come è piccolo il cielo/Non sapevo
CN A 9074	1963	Beppe Cardile	Occhi di cielo/Per piacere
CN A 9075	1963	Tania Raggi	Se una donna/Sauve moi
CN A 9076	1963	I Peos	Il mio funerale/La gabola
CN A 9080	1963	Santi Latora	Stessa spiaggia, stesso mare/Django
CN A 9082	1963	Giancarlo Silvi	Tu/Compagna di scuola
CN A 9083	1963	Santi Latora	Serenata in blu/Baci
CN A 9084	1963	Franco De Marchis	Attimi (estasi)/Le parole vanno via
CN A 9085	8 ottobre 1963	Silvio Bernini	Ti parlerò d'amore/Musica proibita
CN A 9088	1963	Geo Zoffoli Quintet	Battesimo in Alabama/Jungle Twist
CN A 9090	1963	Beppe Cardile	Il tempo passa/Quando piove
CN A 9094	1963	Pino Presti	Il surf della bambola/Il surf del giornale
CN A 9095	10 dicembre 1963	Giorgio Onorato	Stornelli amorosi 1ª parte/Stornelli amorosi 2ª parte
CN A 9108	16 marzo 1964	Los Marcellos Ferial	Vaya con Dios/Dimmelo
CN A 9112	9 aprile 1964	Los Marcellos Ferial	Sei diventata nera/Piccola timida fragile
CN A 9113	1964	Pupo De Luca	Dai dai twist/Hully gully Polly
CN A 9117	1964	Giancarlo Silvi	E così sia/Non puoi dire che non fa per me
CN A 9121	1964	Pupo De Luca	Swanie River/Jepper Screepper
CN A 9128	1964	I Bagnini	Topless/Beach Bum
CN A 9134	1964	Renata Pacini	Un ragazzo terribile/Lo faccio per te
CN A 9137	1964	Pino Presti	Rimani ancora/Oh! Jenny
CN A 9141	16 dicembre 1964	Nanni Svampa	Si può morire/Il mio funerale
CN A 9142	1964	Nanni Svampa	A l'era sabet sera/La circunvalaziun
CN A 9144	1965	Beppe Cardile	L'amore è partito/Felicità
CN A 9146	1965	Los Marcellos Ferial	Gabrielle/Serate a Mosca
CN A 9147	1965	Renato & i Misfits	Sei la sola/Tu non hai mai capito
CN A 9150	12 febbraio 1965	Nanni Svampa	Io vado in banca/Ballata del metronotte
CN A 9151	1965	Mario Zelinotti	Lei dice/Ti pentirai
CN A 9152	1965	Silvio Bernini	L'estate addosso/Castelli di sabbia
CN A 9163	1965	The Pebbles	Il nuovo giorno/Domani capirai
CN A 9167	1965	Gli Alligatori	Su, Paolo/Chi sbaglia paga da sé
CN A 9175	1965	Franco Cassano	Preludio-Corale/Corale
CN A 9183	1966	Renata Pacini	In nome dell'amore/L'amore non ha età
CN A 9187	1966	I Kings	1-2-3/La risposta (Blowin' in the wind)
CN A 9189	1966	Aura D'Angelo	La città triste/Oggi con te domani chissà
CN A 9191	1966	Franco Cassano	A taste of honey/Sunday morning
CN A 9192	1966	The Crazy Boys	Addio Margaretha/Si credile
CN A 9196	1966	Marcello Minerbi	Juanita Banana/Mary-Elle
CN A 9199	1966	Renata Pacini	In nome dell'amore/Mettiamoci una pietra sopra
CN A 9201	1966	Beppe Cardile	Voi che siete amici suoi/Lascia il tuo mondo
CN A 9202	1966	Le Snobs	Lettera bruciata (A lover's concerto)/Dicci come finì (Peaches'n cream)
CN A 9204	1966	I Crazy Boys	Grazie per avermi aspettato/Quel tipo lì
CN A 9207	1966	Caterina Agos	Tutte stupide come me/Ricordati di me
CN A 9213	1967	Marcello Minerbi	Guantanamera/Verde luna
CN A 9216	1967	Lui e Lia	Chi ci pensava/Tu che ridi
CN A 9217	1967	Aura D'Angelo	Non mi devi niente/Ma come posso amare te!
CN A 9218	1967	Davide e Sara	Facciamo l'amore non la guerra/La linea verde
CN A 9220	1967	Santi Latora	Love Me True/In The Arms Of Love
CN A 9224	1967	I Kings	Lasciati portare via/Caffè amaro
CN A 9225	1967	Lucia Rango	Il tuo volto/Ti ho sognato
CN A 9226	1967	Los Marcellos Ferial	Quando vedrò/Mascia
CN A 9229	1967	I Crazy Boys	Quando un uomo ama una donna/La storia dell'umanità
CN A 9236	1967	Rocky Roberts	Got a thing going/Gira gira
CN A 9245	1967	Santi Latora	Quelli della San Pablo/L'immensità
CN A 9246	1967	I Crazy Boys	Cerca cerca il grande amore/L'innominato
CN A 9249	1967	Wess & The Airedales	Senza luce/I'm a Short-Timer
CN A 9252	1967	Gli Hoods	Hey ragazza/Un muro di pietra
CN A 9259	1967	Wess & The Airedales	I miei giorni felici/I'll Never Turn My Back on You
CN A 9260	1967	Los Marcellos Ferial	Si va sulla montagna/L'inno dei Marines
CN A 9267	1967	Marcello Minerbi	Love is blue/From your side
CN A 9268	1968	Ettore Cenci guitar	Fiesta/Escalation
CN A 9271	1968	Gino Paoli	Se Dio ti da'/Dormi
CN A 9273	1968	Virginia	Dixie/Pensandoci su
CN A 9274	1968	George Colt	Bonnie e Clyde/Sol-Si 7
CN A 9276	1968	I Crazy Boys	Fai un po' quello che vuoi/Tu nel sogno
CN A 9278	1968	Rocky Roberts e I Pyranas	Sono tremendo/Se una sera
CN A 9279	1968	I Crazy Boys	Hai negli occhi tutto il sole del mondo/Addio Margaretha
CN A 9280	1968	I Crazy Boys	Tu che conosci lei/Un mondo su misura
CN A 9281	1968	Wess & The Airedales	Perché sei beat, perché sei pop/My sun is shining
CN A 9282	1968	Paolo & I Crazy Boys	Il primo pensiero d'amore/Giochi di parole
CN A 9283	1968	The Gang Orchestra	Zum zum zum/Don cin bum
CN A 9291	1968	Franco Cassano	Obladì obladà/Notti d'amore
CN A 9293	1968	I Marcellos Ferial	Michael/Antonietta
CN A 9296	1969	Joyce & The Jokers	Io voglio te/Manchi tu dentro me
CN A 9298	1969	Paolo & I Crazy Boys	Cuore mio/Un giardino senza fiori
CN A 9301	1969	Wess & The Airedales	Ti ho inventata io/Voltami le spalle
CN A 9305	1969	Gino Paoli	Come si fa/Monique
CN A 9306	1969	Marcello Minerbi	To yelasto pedi/Esaurimento
CN A 9309	1969	Paolo & i Crazy Boys	Arrivederci/Ti perderò
CN A 9310	1969	Lillian	Tutto il mio mondo/Musica di stelle
CN A 9311	1969	Rocky Roberts	Ma non ti lascio/Appassionatamente
CN A 9312	1969	Sacha Ketoff	Ritratto di chimera/America
CN A 9313	1969	Wess & The Airedales	Amore mio/Tum Tum Tum
CN A 9314	1969	Gino Paoli	Albergo a ore/Il tuo viso di sole
CN A 9316	1969	Lillian	Un giorno come un altro/Cielo azzurro
CN A 9318	1970	Rocky Roberts	Accidenti/I know you'll come running back
CN A 9319	1970	Wess & The Airedales	Quando/L'arca di Noè
CN A 9321	1970	Wess & The Airedales	Tu che non mi conoscevi/Solitudine
CN A 9323	1970	Lillian	Un bambino biondo/Ci sarà lui
CN A 9324	1970	Gino Paoli	Un po' di pena/Accadde così
CN A 9327	1970	Wess & The Airedales	Occhi pieni di vento/Io t'amerò fino all'ultimo mondo
CN A 9328	1970	Wess & The Airedales	Peccato!/La notte è troppo lunga
CN A 9331	1972	Wess e Dori Ghezzi / Wess & The Airedales	Voglio stare con te/There's Gonna Be a Revolution
CN A 9332	1972	Wess & The Airedales	Il vento amico/Che giorno è
CN A 9333	1973	Wess	Il Lago maggiore/Io sto bene senza te
CN A 9334	1973	Wess	Il primo appuntamento/Quel giorno
CN A 9335	1973	Wess e Dori Ghezzi	Tu nella mia vita/Sentimento, sentimento
CN A 9336	1974	Wess e Dori Ghezzi	Noi due per sempre/Se mi vuoi ancora bene
CN A 9337	1974	Wess	Aspetti un bambino/Io ti perdo
CN A 9338	1975	Wess e Dori Ghezzi	Un corpo e un'anima/Sempre tu
CN A 9339	14 marzo 1975	Wess e Dori Ghezzi	Era/...e siamo qui
CN A 9340	1975	Wess e Dori Ghezzi	È l'amore che muore/Tutto bene
CN A 9342	1975	Wess	Have Mercy/My Sun Is Shining
CN A 9343	1976	Wess e Dori Ghezzi	Come stai, con chi sei/Più ti voglio bene, più te ne vorrei
CN A 9344	1976	Wess e Dori Ghezzi	Amore bellissimo/La sola cosa che ho
CN A 9345	1977	Wess	Carrie/Good Time
CN AI 9350	1979	Wess	S'arrende il mio corpo/Dieci anni di meno

=== EP - Dischi Circus ===
Catalogue No.	Year	Performer	Title
CEX A 303	1961	Quintetto Andrea Tosi	Pomodoro cha cha cha/Pepe/Ricordati di me/L'immensità

=== 45 rpm - Durium Marche Estere ===
The Durium Marche Estere was a sub-label of the parent company, which in theory would have had to print disks of foreign origin, although in reality this did not always happen: in some cases it printed discs of songs of soundtracks.

The numbering, however, was preceded by the prefix DE, while in the label (which was different from the durium standard, as it had a large "d" corresponding to the disc hole) there was the writing Durium Marche Estere.

Catalogue No.	Year	Performer	Title
DE 2453	1962	Robert Pray	Il giorno più lungo/Siamo giovani
DE 2459	1962	Los Marcellos Ferial	Triangulo/El Cigarron
DE 2490	1963	Los Marcellos Ferial	Cuando brilla la luna/Estoy enamorado
DE 2502	27 giugno 1963	Mort Garson and His Orchestra	Come conquistare un ragazzo/Bowl a rama stomp
DE 2538	1963	Marcello Minerbi	Charade/Orange tamouré
DE 2578	1964	The Supremes	Where Did Our Love Go/He Means the World to Me
DE 2594	1964	The Supremes	Come See About Me/(You're Gone But) Always in My Heart
DE 2663	1966	The Music Machine	Talk Talk/Come on in
DE 2753	1971	Malaika	Marghareta/Upendo Malaika
DE 2806	1973	Gino	Give a hand/Listen to me little girl
DE 2997	1978	Sundown Emotions	Sundown Part 1/Sundown Part 2
DE 3003	1978	Gilla	The River Sings/Bend Me Shape Me
DE 3196	1982	Plastic Bertrand	Ping Pong/Chewing Gum

=== 33 rpm - Dischi Adventure ===
The Durium distributed (and later took over) also Roman label, Discs Adventure, specializing in launching new artists and publishing of jazz albums. The letter A of the 45 rpm is found in some issues detached from the two letters AV, and in others attached.

Catalogue No.	Year	Performer	Title
AV LP 300/001	1960	Amedeo Tommasi	Zamboni 22

=== EP - Dischi Adventure ===
Catalogue No.	Year	Performer	Title
E 131	1961	Roman New Orleans Jazz Band	eale street blues/Goodbye/Emaline/The faithful hussar

=== 45 rpm - Dischi Adventure ===
Catalogue No.	Year	Performer	Title
AV A 1117	1959	Salomon & i Pyramids	Rugby cha cha cha/Quiero Besarte
AV NS 1123	1960	I Gangsters	Morgen/The madison
AV NS 1130	1960	Giulia Jandolo	Quanno Roma era più piccola/'Na gita a li castelli
AV NS 1132	1960	Giulia Jandolo	Stornelli tradizionali (parte 1)/Stornelli tradizionali (parte 2)
AV N 1135	1960	Jula de Palma	Ave Maria/Bianco Natale
AV A 1179	1961	I Mattatori	Passione/T'aspetto

=== 33 rpm - Royal series ===
As mentioned before, the Royal (whose headquarters was in Via Indipendenza 32 in Naples) was specialized in the launch of new artists, and was shortly after incorporated into the parent company: for this reason the first issues have only the writing Royal, then replaced from Durium - Royal Series, while the numbering of the catalogue continues sequentially and continues with the Royal series. The letter A is found in some issues detached from the two letters QC, and in others attached.

Catalogue No.	Year	Performer	Title
msr M 300/004	1961	Mario Trevi	Senti Napoli e poi...
msr M 300/005	1962	Vinicio	Vinicio - Fisarmonica e ritmi
msr M 300/006	1963	Matteo Salvatore	Storie e melodie d'amore del Sud
msr M 300/009	1963	Mario Trevi	Indifferentemente
msr M 300/011	1964	Vinicio	Fisarmonica e ritmi
msr M 300/012	1965	Vinicio	Vinicio "Paso Doble"
msr M 300/013	1965	Mario Trevi	Canzoni napoletane classiche
msr M 300/014	1966	Mario Trevi	Canzoni classiche napoletane, volume II
msr A 300/014	1965	Arrangiamenti di Marcello Minerbi	A tempo di sirtaki
msr A 300/015	1966	Bruno Venturini	Eternamente t'amerò
msr A 300/016	1966	Mario Trevi	Canzoni napoletane moderne
msr M 300/017	1966	Vinicio	I migliori di Vinicio

=== 45 rpm - Royal series ===
Catalogue No.	Year	Performer	Title
QC N 1017	1959	Irene D'Areni	Gloria/Blue Moon
QC M 1031	1959	Vinicio	Tarantella napoletana/Quadriglia napoletana
QC N 1036	1959	Campanino	Ma-Ma non mi sgridare più/Bye Bye love
QC N 1037	1959	Campanino	Nun me guardà/Wan't You Give me A Chance
QC N 1038	1959	Nuzzo Salonia	Accussì/Solitudine
QC N 1041	1959	Mario Trevi e Tina De Paolis	Suttanella e cazunciello/Napulione 'e Napule
QC N 1042	1959	Mario Trevi	Vieneme 'nzuonno/'Mbraccio a tte
QC A 1043	1959	Vinicio	Kriminal tango/Una notte a Malaga
QC A 1045	1959	Tina De Paolis	Cerasella/'O destino 'e ll'ate
QC A 1065	1959	Piero Dani	Pienze a mme/Bbona jurnata Napule
QC A 1066	1959	Evy Angeli	Come il mare/Questi sono gli uomini
QC A 1067	1959	I Mattatori	Be Bop A Lula/T'ho vista piangere
QC A 1068	1959	I Mattatori	So che un dì/Tintarella di luna
QC A 1070	1959	Franca Aldrovandi	Concertino/Hey tu!
QC A 1071	1959	Franca Aldrovandi	Gli zingari/Lo stregone
QC A 1089	1960	Bruno Venturini	Colpevole/Gridare di gioia
QC A 1090	1960	Bruno Venturini	Gridare di gioia/Quando vien la sera
QC A 1092	1960	Sestetto Armonia	Estate violenta/The enchanted sea
QC A 1098	1960	Bruno Venturini	Sei terribile/Un po' di luna
QC A 1099	1960	Bruno Venturini	Welcome to Rome/Olimpia rock
QC N 1106	1960	Mario Trevi	Canzone all'antica/Stasera si
QC N 1107	1960	Mario Trevi	Segretamente/Nuvole
QC N 1112	1960	Tina De Paolis	Cucù settè/Serenatella c''o si e c''o no
QC N 1125	1960	Mario Trevi	'O sfaticato/L'urdema nustalgia
QC A 1144	1960	Bruno Venturini	'O locco/Maschera
QC A 1145	1960	Bruno Venturini	'O bbene/Escludimi
QC A 1148	1960	Bruno Venturini	Mille e mille anni/Eccoti
QC M 1186	1960	Franco D'Ambra	Zi' Nicola/Cha cha cha abruzzese
QC A 1192	1961	Mario Trevi	Mare verde/'Nnammuratella
QC A 1193	1961	Mario Trevi	È napulitana/Notte 'ncantata
QC A 1196	1961	Clara Profili	Credere/'O fidanzato
QC A 1202	1961	Luisito	Fumando espero/Bandolero
QC A 1207	1961	Mario Trevi	Cunto 'e lampare/N'ata dummeneca
QC A 1208	1961	Mario Trevi	Settembre cu mme/Vicino a tte
QC A 1209	1961	Franco D'Ambra	Tu sempe/'O tuono 'e marzo
QC A 1217	1961	Clara Profili	Credimi amor/Il cha cha cha dell'angelo custode
QC A 1218	1961	Mario Trevi	È desiderio/'O codice 'e ll'ammore
QC A 1219	1961	Mario Trevi	Paese mio/Si comm' 'o sole
QC A 1222	1961	Vinicio	Tango dei barbudos/Fidel tango
QC A 1225	1962	I Mattatori	Oye my son cha cha/Que serà mi china
QC A 1226	1962	I Mattatori	Sera serena/Per sempre
QC A 1236	1962	Bruno Venturini	Angela/Balliamo il twist (Let's twist again)
QC A 1238	1962	Franco D'Ambra	Via Partenope/Stanza verde
QC A 1240	1962	Vinicio	Tango dello spaccone/Il nostro tango
QC A 1241	1962	Vinicio	Vigliacca/T.T. Tango twist
QC A 1242	1962	Vinicio	Tango al plastico/Tango beduino
QC A 1243	1962	Vinicio	Tango seducente/Tango del gagà
QC A 1244	1962	Vinicio	Tango argentino/Tango 1925
QC A 1252	1962	Rosalie Savini	Nuttata 'e luna/Fermate
QC A 1253	1962	Vinicio	Tango del ghisa/Armonica twist
QC A 1254	1962	Vinicio	Chiaro di luna a Paullo/La giostra
QC A 1255	1962	Vinicio	Tango della ghigliottina/Non sparate sulla fisa
QC A 1259	1963	Matteo Salvatore	Lo sposalizio/Il pescivendolo
QC A 1266	1963	Bruno Venturini	Sentimentale/Tu iste a Surriento
QC A 1267	1963	Gina Armani	Serenata a Surriento/Nun turnà
QC A 1268	1963	Clara Profili	Ma chi te pò capì/Tammurriata twist
QC A 1269	1963	Franco D'Ambra	Mille buscie/Nuie ce lassammo
QC A 1275	1963	Vinicio	Agua/Tango ribelle
QC A 1276	1963	Giannetto	Bambino triste/A me piace Celentano
QC A 1277	1963	Matteo Salvatore	L'ambulante/La bicicletta twist N° 3
QC A 1278	1963	Matteo Salvatore	Lu terremoto/Cunta l'ore
QC A 1282	1963	Vinicio	Las campanas/Valzer chic
QC A 1285	1963	Bruno Venturini	L'ha 'mpruvvisata 'o mare/Lacreme
QC A 1286	1963	Franco D'Ambra	Santa Maria/Sott' 'o manto 'e sta città
QC A 1287	1963	Vinicio	Tango paulista/Nazional tango
QC A 1290	1963	Isabella Iannetti	T'hanno vista domenica sera/In cima ai miei pensieri
QC A 1293	1963	Mario Trevi	Canzone appassionata/Mierolo affurtunato
QC A 1294	1963	Franco D'Ambra	Malvagità/Giuvinotto 'e primma uscita
QC A 1295	1963	Bruno Venturini	Pazzarella pazzarè/Che voglio a te?
QC A 1298	1963	Giannetto	Se non mi dai le lire per il cinema/E piantala!
QC A 1299	1963	Giannetto	Non vinco mai/Ma guarda...
QC A 1300	1963	Isabella Iannetti	Un ragazzo così/Non lo farò mai più
QC M 1301	1963	Luciano De Salvo	La cifalota/'E vui durmiti ancora
QC A 1303	1963	Mario Trevi	Indifferentemente/Catene d'ammore
QC A 1305	1963	Isabella Iannetti	Un ragazzo così/Non lo farò mai più
QC A 1310	1963	Isabella Iannetti	Il gatto e la volpe/Ma lo vuoi capire
QC A 1313	1964	Franco D'Ambra	Luntano/E fermate nu poco
QC A 1316	1964	Bruno Venturini	Eternamente t'amerò/Ritornerai da me
QC A 1319	1964	Isabella Iannetti	Va...tu sei libero/Sola tra sole e sale
QC A 1325	1964	Mario Trevi	Me parlano e te/L'ombra d' 'a sera
QC A 1326	1964	Mario Trevi	Sole 'e luglio/Canzuncella ca vena e va
QC A 1328	1964	Mario Trevi	'O marenariello/Ll'arte d' 'o sole
QC A 1329	1964	Mario Trevi	Chella d' 'e rrose/Scetate
QC A 1330	1964	Isabella Iannetti	Quanti ragazzi/Difenderò il mio amore
QC A 1331	1964	Mario Trevi	Spezzacatena/Pà malavia
QC A 1336	1965	Isabella Iannetti	Sono tanto innamorata/No, non ti lascerò
QC M 1337	1965	Vinicio	Tango 007/Operazione valzer
QC A 1338	1965	Mario Trevi	Te voglio bene assaje/Dicitencello vuje
QC A 1339	1965	Mario Trevi	Mbraccia a me!/Core furastiero
QC A 1340	1965	Mario Trevi	Era de maggio/Qui fu Napoli
QC M 1342	1965	Riccardo Rolli	La strada/L'estate poi finirà
QC A 1343	1965	Marco Manni	Nel regno dell'amore/Quando vedo gli altri
QC A 1344	1965	Mario Trevi	Niente cchiù/'A voce 'e ll'ammore
QC A 1345	1965	Mario Trevi	È frennesia!/'Na catena 'e lacreme
QC A 1346	1965	Isabella Iannetti	Guardame/Core napulitano
QC A 1347	1965	Bruno Venturini	Bella si vuò l'ammore/Voglio credere
QC A 1351	1965	Isabella Iannetti	Vivrei di pane/M'hai detto ciao
QC A 1352	1965	Mario Trevi	Sulo e senza 'e te/Catenella
QC A 1353	1965	Mario Trevi	Buon Natale/Stella d'oriente
QC A 1354	1965	Nicola D'Alessio	Sangue amaro/Ma pe' sfortuna
QC A 1356	1966	Isabella Iannetti	L'amore nei ragazzi come noi/C'è lui che mi consola
QC A 1361	1966	Mimì Bertè	Non sarà tardi/Quattro settimane
QC A 1362	1966	Isabella Iannetti	Una danza al chiar di luna/Parla con lui
QC A 1363	1966	Roby Matano	Ciò che voglio/Se ti va
QC A 1364	1966	Mario Trevi	Rose d' 'o mese 'e maggio/Core busciardo
QC A 1365	1966	Mario Trevi	Che chiagne a ffà!/'O core mio
QC A 1366	1966	Mario Trevi	Dove vai/Tutti vanno via
QC A 1367	1966	Mario Trevi	Vint'anne/Serenatela a 'na cumpagna 'e scola
QC A 1368	1966	Mario Trevi	Catena/Simmo 'e Napule paisà
QC A 1369	1966	Mario Trevi	Vierno/'O vascio
QC A 1370	1966	Mario Trevi	Munasterio 'e Santa Chiara/Scalinatella
QC A 1371	1966	Mario Trevi	Luna rossa/Giuramento
QC A 1372	1966	Mario Trevi	Sciummo/Dimme addo' staje
QC A 1375	1966	Roby Matano & his sounds	Una bambolina che fa no, no, no.../Non andare via
QC A 1376	1966	Mario Trevi	Stasera voglio a 'tte/Vocca 'e russetto
QC A 1378	1966	Jacqueline	Sbaglierò/Ci devo pensare
QC A 1382	1967	Mario Trevi	Casarella 'e piscatore/Biancaneve
QC A 1384	1967	Nicola D'Alessio	L'11 è marzo/Angela
QC A 1388	1968	Mario Trevi	Lacrema/'A femmena 'e mò
QC A 1389	1968	Mario Trevi	Comm' 'a 'nu sciummo/È cchiù forte 'e me
QC A 1395	1967	Nicola D'Alessio	Se io parto domani/Baciarti è troppo poco
QC A 1379	1967	Isabella Iannetti	Corriamo/Chiedilo al tuo cuore
QC A 1383	1967	Isabella Iannetti	Una testa dura/Vome puoi dimenticare
QC A 1385	1968	Isabella Iannetti	Stanotte sentirai una canzone/Un riflesso nell'acqua
QC A 1386	1968	Isabella Iannetti	Ricorda Ricorda/Melodia
QC A 1393	1968	Isabella Iannetti	Natale è qui/Buon Natale mio amor
QC A 1394	1969	Isabella Iannetti	Una famiglia/Il tic tac del cuore
QC A 1396	1969	Isabella Iannetti	Cuore Innamorato/Il tic tac del cuore
QC A 1397	1969	Mario Trevi	'E mimose/'O mese 'e maggio
QC L 1398	1969	Mario Trevi	Cara busciarda/L'ultima sera
QC A 1399	1969	Isabella Iannetti	La lettera/Ora che ti amo
QC A 1401	1970	Isabella Iannetti	Falsità/L'ultimo cuore

=== EP ===
Catalogue No.	Year	Performer	Title
ep A 3001	1955	Roberto Murolo	Serenatella a 'na cumpagna 'e scola/Passione/Sciummo/'A casciaforte
ep A 3003	1955	Edoardo Lucchina fisarmonica solista e ritmi	Appassionato tango/Charmaine/Il valzer del buon umore/Mazurca variata
ep A 3018	1955	Edoardo Lucchina fisarmonica solista e ritmi	Polvere/Cenere/Zin zin zin/Arrivederci Roma
ep A 3021	1956	Aurelio Fierro	Garua/Adios muchachos/No es lindo/Mi alma
ep A 3022	1956	Edoardo Lucchina e il suo complesso, canta Sergio Centi	Marcelino pan y vino/Angolo di cielo/'Na voce 'na chitarra (e 'o poco 'e luna)/L'ostricaro nnammurato
ep A 3024	1956	Edoardo Lucchina fisarmonica solista e ritmi	Il conte di Lussemburgo/I milioni di Arlecchino/La vedova allegra/Sogno di un valzer
ep A 3025	1956	Edoardo Lucchina e la sua orchestra	'O nfinfero/'O sciupafemmene/Vienetenne a Positano/'O ritratto 'e Nanninella
ep A 3029	1956	Rino Salviati	Le canzoni di Rino Salviati
ep A 3031	1956	Edoardo Lucchina e la sua orchestra	Hernando's Hideaway/La rosa tatuata/The elephant's tango/Unchained melody
ep A 3032	1956	Aurelio Fierro	Manname 'nu raggio 'e sole/'A palummella/Guaglione/'A quaterna
ep A 3034	1957	Tullio Mobiglia e Carlo Savina	The Deep Blue Sea
ep A 3035	1957	Aurelio Fierro	Lazzarella/Storta va...deritta vene/Cantammola 'sta canzone/L'ultimo raggio 'e Luna
ep A 3038	1957	Edoardo Lucchina e il suo complesso, canta Louis Binder	Chiodo scaccia chiodo/Con te per sempre/El pelotero/Semplice canzone
ep A 3039	1957	Tullio Mobiglia e Flo Sandon's	Rock around the clock/Rock a beatin' boogie/I want you to be my baby/Burn that candle
ep A 3042	4 January 1957	Flo Sandon's	Domani (Tomorrow)/Vogliamoci tanto bene/Solo tu (Only you)/Que serà serà
ep A 3045	1957	Marino Marini	Marino Marini e il suo quartetto
ep A 3047	1957	Edoardo Lucchina fisarmonica solista e ritmi	Rose del Sud/Vita d'artista/Valzer imperiale/Storielle del bosco viennese
ep A 3048	1957	Aurelio Fierro	Le canzoni della fortuna
ep A 3050	27 March 1957	Edoardo Lucchina fisarmonica solista e ritmi	Foglie del mattino/Vino, donne e canto/Vienna Vienna/Sulle rive del Danubio azzurro
ep A 3052	1957	Aurelio Fierro	'na sera 'e maggio/Come facette mammeta/Passione/Funiculì funiculà
ep A 3053	1957	Aurelio Fierro	Marechiaro/'o marenariello/Santa Lucia/Core 'ngrato
ep A 3059	1957	Edoardo Lucchina fisarmonica solista e ritmi	Lazzarella/'Nnammurate dispettuse/Napule sole mio!/L'ultimo raggio 'e luna
ep A 3060	1957	Marino Marini	Marino Marini e il suo quartetto
ep A 3062	1957	Flo Sandon's e il Quartetto Radar	Calypsos
ep A 3063	1957	Rino Salviati	Le canzoni di Rino Salviati
ep A 3071	12 October 1957	Marino Marini	Chu chu bella/La Marie Vison/Sur ma vie/Si si si la vie est belle
ep A 3074	1957	Quartetto Radar	Buon Natale!
ep A 3079	17 December 1957	Marino Marini	La più bella del mondo/Donne e pistole/La bella del giorno/L'amore non conosce confini
ep A 3083	1958	Aurelio Fierro	Aurelio Fierro a Sanremo
ep A 3084	1958	Edoardo Lucchina	I motivi di Sanremo
ep A 3088	14 February 1958	Marino Marini	Capricciosa/With all my heart (con tutto il cuore)/Non so dir... (ti voglio bene)/Piccolissima serenata
ep A 3092	7 March 1958	Quartetto Radar	Brivido blu/Alberi/Juke Box/La vita è fatta di piccole cose
ep A 3094	21 December 1958	Aurelio Fierro	Canzoni di altri tempi
ep A 3095	December 1958	Aurelio Fierro	La canzone dell'amore/Fili d'oro/Signorinella/Reginella
ep A 3097	December 1958	Rino Salviati	Cu Cu Ru Cu Cu Paloma
ep A 3100	December 1958	Flo Sandon's	Come prima/Concerto d'autunno/My prayer/Le rififi
ep A 3108	1958	Cosetta Greco	Canzoni d'altri tempi:Serenata ad un angelo/Per te vivrò/Nostalgico slow/Voglio essere felice
ep A 3120	4 September 1958	Marino Marini	Magic moments/E' sempe 'a stessa/Come prima/Buonasera (signorina)
ep A 3132	1958	Germana Caroli	Non partir/Dors mon amour/La pioggia cadrà/Magic moments
ep A 3136	1959	Quartetto Radar con Orchestra Tony De Vita	Cleopatra/Bellissima/Sei chic/Oh Lola
ep A 3143	1959	Little Tony & his brothers	Rock And Roll
ep A 3146	1959	Marino Marini	Li' per li'/Io sono il vento/Ne' stelle ne' mare/Per tutta la vita
ep A 3150	1959	Angela Denia con l'orchestra di Edoardo Lucchina	Donna/Condannami/Jacqueline/Bing bang bong
ep A 3152	1959	Germana Caroli	Dance darling dance/Parole alla luna/Ti prego, amore/Ehi tu!
ep A 3154	1959	Gianni Marzocchi	Per un bacio d'amor/Quartiere dei lillà/Sempre con te/Julia
ep A 3157	1959	Marino Marini	Don Nicola 'O Cosacco/Nun te voglio perdere/'E scalelle d' 'o Paraviso/Alike-Sisky-Ba
ep A 3163	1959	I Canterini di Sturla	Vecchia Sturla - Squadra di canto genovese
ep A 3164	1959	I Canterini di Sturla	Vecchia Sturla - Squadra di canto genovese vol. 2
ep A 3176	1959	Flo Sandon's	Arrivederci/Kiss Me/Passion Flower/Tom Dooley
ep A 3179	1959	Marino Marini	Guarda che luna/Vamos/Come softly to me/Quando dicesti si
ep A 3180	1959	Guidone	Ciao, ti dirò/Ma l'amore no/Cow Boy/Love in Portofino
ep A 3181	24 August 1959	Gastone Parigi e il suo Quintetto	I Sing "Ammore"/Tu (non devi farlo più)/Kiss me kiss me/Il mio solo ideale
ep A 3182	1959	Flo Sandon's	Successi: Guarda che luna/Labbra di fuoco/Buondì/Kiss me kiss me
ep A 3185	1959	Gianni Marzocchi	Nuvola per due/Nu' t'add'avé 'nisciuno/Diamoci del tu/Amorevole
ep A 3188	1959	Flo Sandon's	Concertino/Cercando l'amore (Faded Orchid)/La strada dell'amore/La fine
ep N 119	1960	Mario Trevi	Festival di Napoli 1960
ep A 3190	1960	Caprice Chantal	Le ore/Non me lo devi dir/Oggi si domani no/Noi due
ep A 3192	1960	Marino Marini	Marina/Sei bella/Lisbona mia/Un telegramma
ep A 3197	1960	Gastone Parigi e il suo Quartetto	Notte lunga notte/Noche de ronda cha cha cha/Cara, amore, tesoro/Cha cha cha de las segretarias
ep A 3202	1960	Marino Marini	Kriminal tango/Maria Maddalena/Ritroviamoci/I Sing "Ammore"
ep A 3204	1960	Flo Sandon's	Sanremo 1960: E' vero/'A' come amore/Colpevole/Invoco te
ep A 3205	1960	Germana Caroli	Sanremo 1960
ep A 3207	1960	Sergio Franchi	Sanremo 1960: Perdoniamoci/Splende l'arcobaleno/Perderti/Splende il sole
ep A 3209	1960	Marino Marini	Libero/È vero/Romantica/Notte mia
ep A 3214	1960	Clem Sacco	Vedo/Se tu mi baci/Forse forse più/Basta
ep A 3215	1960	Rino Salviati	Rino Club
ep M 3221	1961	Fausto Papetti	Sax alto e ritmi
ep A 3233	1961	Marino Marini	Coriandoli/Ho la testa come un pallon/Baciare, baciare/Briciole di baci
ep A 3242	1961	Guidone	Baci a gogò/Music hall/Non ti posso lasciare/Lasciati baciare
ep A 3258	1961	Carlo Mauri con il suo Quintetto	Dammi la mano e corri/Prima di partir/Amore a Palma de Mallorca/Vicino a te
ep A 3276	1961	Mario Trevi e Aurelio Fierro	Giugno della Canzone Napoletana
ep A 3279	1961	Marino Marini Carlo Mauri Fausto Papetti Piero Bertani	Piccolo Night Club N. 10
ep A 3287	1961	Gastone Parigi Fausto Papetti Marino Marini Edoardo Lucchina	Piccolo Night Club N. 11
ep R A135	1963	Mario Trevi	Mario Trevi
ep A 3301	1962	Little Tony	La bella americana/Twist in Italy/Italian lover/Oh! Baby!
ep M 3323	1964	Edoardo Lucchina	4 tanghi
ep A 3335	1965	Mario Trevi e Isabella Iannetti	Festival di Napoli 1965

=== 45 rpm - Promo Juke-Box ===
Catalogue No.	Year	Performer	Title
LD A 7504	1967	Little Tony / Los Marcellos Ferial	Cuore matto / Quando vedrò
LD A 7513	1967	I Balordi / Little Tony	Domani devo fare una cosa/Peggio per me

== See also ==
- Durium Records (UK)
- Record label
- List of record labels

== Bibliography ==
- The data concerning the recording of the house were taken from phonographic supports issued and stored (like all those published in Italy) at the Discoteca di Stato in Rome.
- Various issues of magazines Music and discs (vintages from 1959 onwards), Il Musichiere (vintages 1959–1960), TV Sorrisi e Canzoni (vintages from 1959 onwards), Ciao 2001, Here youngsters, Big, Music, and many other magazines of musical argument.
- Mario De Luigi, The record industry in Italy, Side Side editions, Rome, 1982
- Mario De Luigi, History of the phonographic industry in Italy, Music and Dischi editions, Milan, 2008
