= Mobiglia =

Mobiglia is a surname. Notable people with the surname include:

- Octávio Mobiglia (1931–2015), Brazilian swimmer
- Tullio Mobiglia (1911–1991), Italian saxophonist and violinist
