= The Day the Rains Came (song) =

1957 popular song

"Le Jour où la pluie viendra"

Song
- Language: French, English, German, Italian
- English title: "The Day the Rains Came"
- Written: 1957
- Composer: Gilbert Bécaud
- Lyricists: Pierre Delanoë (French), Carl Sigman (English), Ernst Bader (German), Mario Panzeri (Italian)

"The Day the Rains Came" or "Am Tag als der Regen kam" or "La pioggia cadrà" is an adaptation of the French song "Le Jour où la pluie viendra". The latter is a popular song released in 1957, composed and written by Gilbert Bécaud and Pierre Delanoë.

Bécaud's version reached number 3 in Wallonia, in a tandem ranking, and number 20 in Flanders.

In the United Kingdom, an English language version by Jane Morgan went to number one for a week in 1959. That version also reached number 4 in Canada, co-charting with Lefèvre's version, and number 7 in Norway.

In the US, Raymond Lefèvre was the first to release the song, but as instrumental under the English title. The song made number 14 on the Billboard Honor Roll of Hits and number 17 on the Cash Box chart, while Lefèvre's and Morgan's versions were marked as bestsellers on both charts. Dalida's French language original was released in US under the English title. "The Day the Rains Came" also reached number 2 on Billboard's sheet music chart.

There have been many covers of the song. In French, it has been recorded by Les Compagnons de la chanson, Guylaine Guy, Nicole Félix, Jane Morgan, Aïda Aznavour, Claude Luter, Jean Bertola and Philippe Andrey; in Italian, as "La pioggia cadrà" with lyrics by Mario Panzeri, by Betty Curtis, Anita Traversi, Nilla Pizzi, Torrebruno, Germana Caroli and Dalida.

== Dalida's version ==
Am Tag als der Regen kam: German adaptation of the song by Dalida (1959)

Dalida's version was also an international success. She recorded it for the first time in 1957 and was among the first places in the rankings in France where the song was released on the A side of a 45 rpm maxi with "Gondolier". Also the song was a #1 hit in Germany and a major success of her career with more than 1,000,000 units sold worldwide. On July 15, 1959, the German music magazine Musikmarkt was published with Dalida on the cover. The magazine judged Dalida's hit as "a won battle for the cultivated, sophisticated hit".

Dalida was credited in 1984 as créatrice de la chanson − expression used in France for the original performer.

=== Charts ===
Year	Country	Peak position	Units sold
1959	Germany	1	+ 850,000
1958	Spain	3	-
1957	France	3	+ 165,000
1957	Wallonia	3	-
