= Umberto Napolitano =

Italian singer-songwriter

- Born: 25 May 1947 (age 79); Brescia, Italy
- Occupation: Singer-songwriter

Umberto Napolitano (born 25 May 1947) is an Italian singer-songwriter and composer, mainly successful in the 1970s.

== Life and career ==
Born in Brescia, Napolitano started his career performing at the Nebbia Club in Milan. He first entered the music industry just as a composer, and had his breakout in 1966 writing for Carmen Villani the pacifist protest song "Mille chitarre contro la guerra".

For his professional career as a singer, Napolitano initially adopted the mononym Umberto, and got his first success with the song "Gioventù", which was entered at the Un disco per l'estate festival and was chosen as the opening song of the popular RAI television game show Chissà chi lo sa?. He had a significant success in the second half of the 1970s, specializing in a light and romantic pop repertoire, and taking part to several editions of the Sanremo Music Festival. Artists who recorded his songs include Loredana Bertè, Rita Pavone, Caterina Caselli, Ricchi e Poveri, Nomadi, I Nuovi Angeli, Dori Ghezzi, Gilda Giuliani, Rosanna Fratello, Antoine. He also worked as a comics writer.

== Discography ==
Album

- 1977 - Giro di "do" - Una canzone d'amore per ogni innamorato (Warner Bros. Records, T 56376)
- 1979 - Umberto Napolitano (Why Records, T 56611)
- 1981 - Noi due nella vita e nell'amore (Amiamoci, AM 4002)
- 1985 - Per le strade del mondo (Harmony, LPH 8050)
- 1987 - Dietro la collina (Pineapple Records, PNLP 2021)
- 1989 - Al mio caro pianeta terra... dieci piccole grandi storie (Iperspazio, PDLP 2289)
- 1991 - Riccioli (Dig-It, PL 12042)
- 1998 - Un'estate d'amore (D.V. More Record, CDDV 6201)
- 2016 - Il bruco (Dielle record)
