= Los Marcellos Ferial =

Italian vocal group

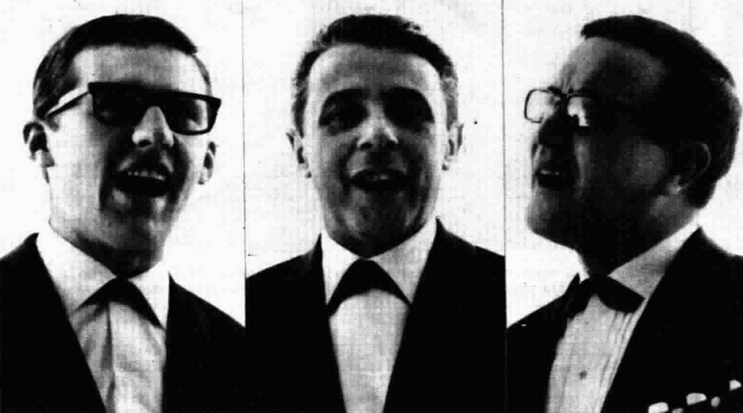
Los Marcellos Ferial

Los Marcellos Ferial (in some recordings the name is credited as I Marcellos Ferial) are an Italian vocal group, mainly active in the sixties, consisting of Marcello Minerbi, Carlo Timò and Tullio Romano.

The vocal trio was formed by the label Durium as a response to the music of Latin America and the Caribbean which was then in trend in Italy; in particular, the trio was called to record a cover version of the Los Hermanos Rigual song "Cuando calienta el sol" before the rival record company RCA could properly publish the original version in Italy. Their version reached the first place on the Italian Hit Parade, but provoked the reaction of RCA who subsequently sued Durium.

The trio was presented by the label and by the press as being composed of Mexicans, and appeared to the events to which was attending in a Chevrolet with a Venezuelan nameplate. When the truth came to light, the group managed to maintain equally successful, leaving the repertoire in Spanish language and winning the 1964 Disco per l'estate with the song "Sei diventata nera", which reached the second place on the Italian Hit Parade. Other successes include "Angelita di Anzio" and "La casa del sole" (a cover version of "The House of the Rising Sun"), both peaking sixth on Hit Parade.
