= Medusa Against the Son of Hercules =

1963 film by Alberto De Martino

- Directed by: Alberto De Martino
- Written by: Mario Guerra; Luciano Martino; Ernesto Gastaldi; Vittorio Vighi
- Starring: Richard Harrison
- Cinematography: Dario Di Palma; Eloy Mella
- Edited by: Otello Colangeli
- Music by: Carlo Franci
- Release date: 1963
- Countries: Italy; Spain
- Language: Italian

Medusa Against the Son of Hercules (Italian: Perseo l'invincibile, lit. 'Perseus the Invincible', Spanish: El valle de los hombres de piedra, lit. 'The Valley of the Stone Men') is a 1963 Italian-Spanish sword and sandal film directed by Alberto De Martino and starring Richard Harrison. It is loosely based on the myth of Perseus and Medusa.

== Plot ==
Medusa is a monster that haunts a barren valley and attacks a group of soldiers; her single eye is capable of turning her victims to stone. The kingdom of Argos uses her to impose suffocating tolls on those who pass through. Perseus, the missing son of the true king of Argos (murdered by a usurper who married his widow), is captured by the troops of an evil monarch and forced to fight as a gladiator. But he escapes and plots to overthrow the villain, still having time to face the Medusa and try his luck if he can bring the petrified soldiers back to life.

== Cast ==
- Richard Harrison as Perseo
- Anna Ranalli as Andromeda
- Arturo Dominici as Acrisio
- Elisa Cegani as Danae
- Antonio Molino Rojo as Tarpete
- Leo Anchóriz Galenore
- Roberto Camardiel as Cefeo
- Ángel Jordán as Alceo
- Fernando Liger
- Bruno Scipioni
- Frank Braña
- Lorenzo Robledo

== Production ==
The effects of Medusa, portrayed as a wandering tree creature with a single glowing eye, were created by Carlo Rambaldi who later worked on the films Alien and E.T. The Extra-Terrestrial.

== Sources ==
- Kinnard, Roy; Crnkovich, Tony (2017). Italian Sword and Sandal Films, 1908-1990. McFarland. ISBN 978-1476662916.
