= Le ambiziose =

1961 film

Le Ambiziose
- Directed by: Antonio Amendola
- Written by: Antonio Amendola; Aldo Barni; Guido Leoni; Nicola Manzari; Carlo Veo
- Produced by: Giorgio Moser
- Cinematography: Giuseppe Aquari
- Edited by: Mario Serandrei; Gabriele Varriale
- Music by: Piero Umiliani
- Release date: 1961
- Running time: 90 minutes
- Country: Italy
- Language: Italian

Le ambiziose (English: Ambitious Women) is a 1961 Italian film directed by Antonio Amendola.

== Plot ==
The "Beauty of the Year" competition brings together thirty beautiful girls in a seaside town. As they prepare for the contest, each ambitious participant tries to win over the jury using various tactics, such as recommendations, threats, promises, and persuasive gestures. Marina, who joins at the last minute to replace another contestant, is motivated by a simple desire to win the sewing machine promised to all participants, regardless of the final rankings.

Federici, a young and disillusioned journalist, is drawn to Marina's modesty. He develops a personal interest in her and tries to help her by resorting to some gentle blackmail. In the end, faced with the jury's disagreement, each determined to promote their favorites, the only way to avoid scandals is to declare the least recommended contestant as the winner. However, it's later revealed that even she had influential recommendations, including from a prominent politician. Marina, despite not winning the top spot, discovers love with Federici.

== Cast ==
- Marisa Merlini as Letizia Proietti
- Memmo Carotenuto as the police marshall
- Ave Ninchi as Ines
- Raffaele Pisu as Nando Moriconi
- Aroldo Tieri as Goffredo Innamorati
- Tino Scotti as Commendator Bartolazzi
- Dominique Boschero as Vanda
- Paolo Falchi as Gina
- Arianne Ulmer as Bettina
- Gabriella Farinon as Marina
- Mario Valdemarin as Federici
- Tiberio Murgia as Brigadier Coccurullo
- Carlo Romano as the jury president
- Anna Ranalli as Rossana
- Raimondo Vianello as the actor

== Censorship ==
When Le ambiziose was first released in Italy in 1961 the Committee for the Theatrical Review of the Italian Ministry of Cultural Heritage and Activities rated it as VM16: not suitable for children under 16. In addition the committee imposed the removal of the following lines and scenes: 1) Flora's line: “He was sophisticated, if he didn’t watch a pornographic film first... then nothing!”; 2) scenes in which the female artist in her studio flatters Miss Calabria (“What a nice tan you have; Lucky sun that can kiss whoever! What a body you have! Your skin is pure and smooth”) along with the scene in which Miss Calabria scared by the attention of the artist leaves the room; 3) any mentions of Prime Minister Amintore Fanfani made by the Festival organizers during the final meeting will be removed. The official document number is: 33723, it was signed on 3 January 1961 by Minister Renzo Helfer.
