= Anna Ranalli =

Italian model, singer and actress (1942–2026)

- Born: 21 January 1942; San Benedetto del Tronto, Italy
- Died: 14 February 2026 (aged 84)
- Occupations: Model; singer; actress

Anna Ranalli (21 January 1942 – 14 February 2026) was an Italian model, singer and actress.

Ranalli was Miss Europe 1960, the second Italian woman to win the award after Eloisa Cianni in 1953. The following year, she released two singles before pursuing an acting career.

Ranalli died on 14 February 2026, at the age of 84.

== Discography ==
- "Il pullover / Patatina" (1961)
- "La pazza nel pozzo / Amore mio mao" (1961)

== Filmography ==
- Rocco e le sorelle (1961)
- I magnifici tre (1961)
- Le ambiziose (1961)
- I 4 tassisti (1963)
- Medusa Against the Son of Hercules (1963)
