= Germana Caroli =

Italian singer (1931–2024)

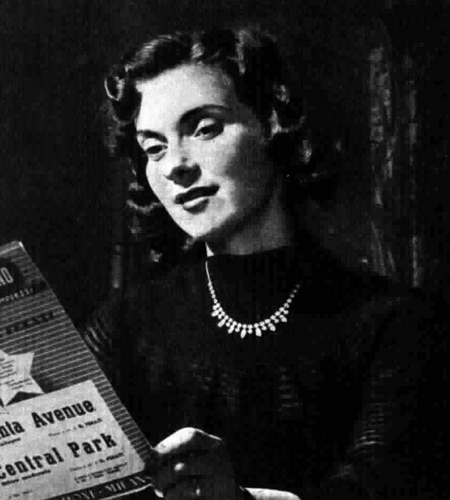
- Born: Germana Mazzetti; 18 August 1931; Bologna, Kingdom of Italy
- Died: 7 January 2024 (aged 92); Monghidoro, Bologna, Italy
- Occupation: Singer

Germana Caroli (born Germana Mazzetti; 18 August 1931 – 7 January 2024) was an Italian singer, mainly active in the 1950s.

== Life and career ==
Born in Bologna on 18 August 1931, Caroli was noted by the composer and conductor Giovanni Fenati while she was performing a song in a nightclub in her hometown. After studying singing, diction and acting, Caroli was entered into the Orchestra Fenati as a vocalist, and with them she got a large success with the song "Ehi, tu" (1954), which subsequently launched her solo career.

Caroli had the peak of her career between the late 1950s and the early 1960s, when she participated to the most important Italian musical events of the time, including Canzonissima, Festival di Napoli and the tenth edition of the Sanremo Music Festival.

Caroli died on 7 January 2024, at the age of 92.

== Discography ==
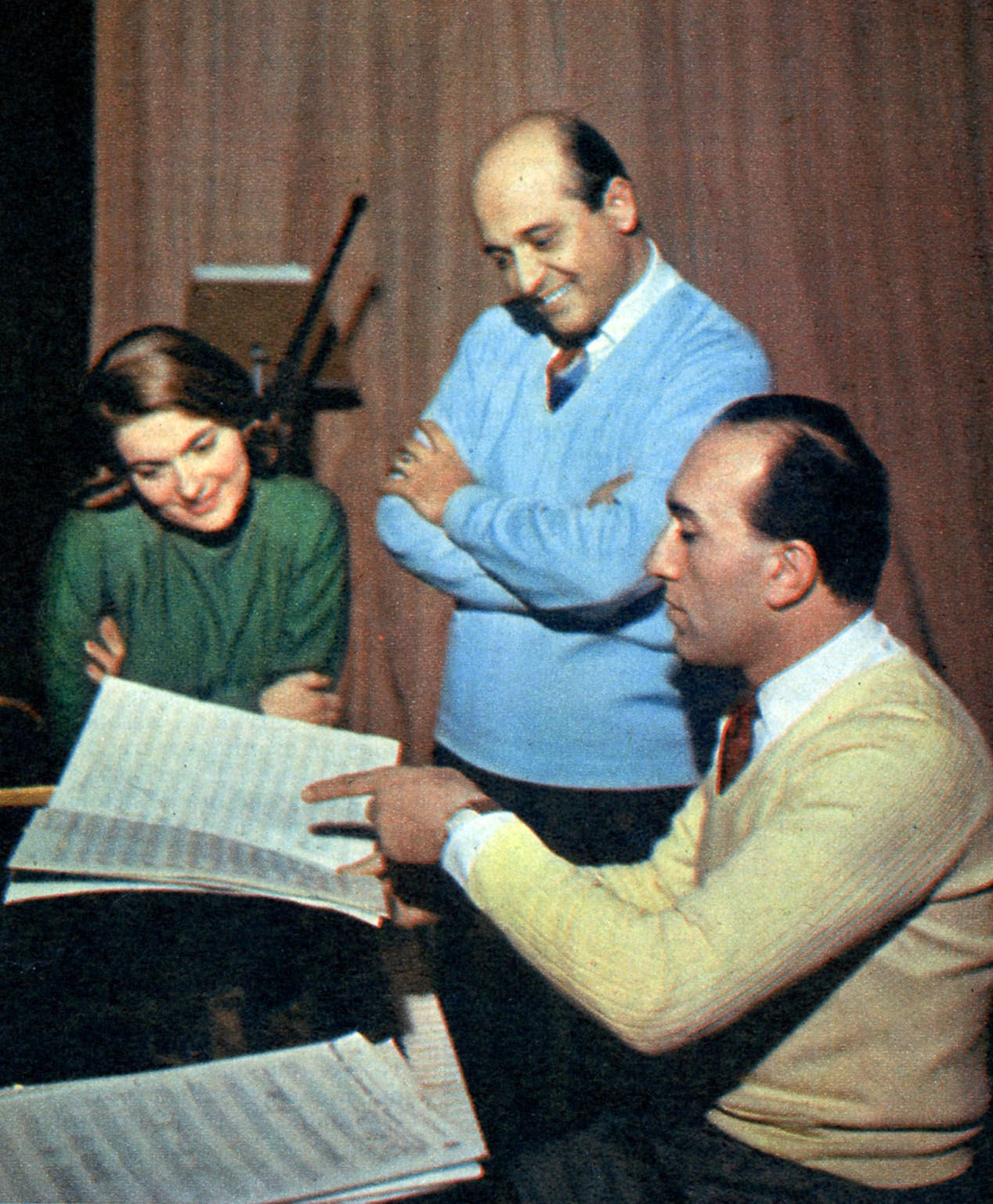
Caroli with composers Bruno Pallesi and Giovanni Fenati (1956)

- 1958 – Magic Moments/Non partir (Durium, Ld A 6394)
- 1958 – La pioggia cadrà/Dors mon amour (Durium, Ld A 6395)
- 1958 – Parole alla luna/Femminilità (Durium, Ld A 6468)
- 1958 – Da te era bello restar/Ehi tu! (Durium, Ld A 6469)
- 1959 – Un bacio sulla bocca/Nessuno (Durium, Ld A 6476)
- 1959 – Ti prego, amore/Dance darling dance (Durium, Ld A 6510)
- 1959 – Petite fleur/D'improvviso (Durium, Ld A 6562)
- 1959 – D'improvviso/Venus (Durium, Ld A 6563)
- 1959 – Passiuncella/'O destino 'e ll'ate (Durium, Ld A 6570)
- 1959 – Rubare/Por dos besos (Durium, Ld A 6730)
- 1960 – Gridare di gioia/Amore senza sole (Durium, Ld A 6738)
- 1960 – Luna, Lina e brezzolina/Di' la tua (Durium, Ld A 6901)
- 1960 – Alle 10 della sera/Diavolo (Durium, Ld A 6953)
- 1961 – Le mille bolle blu/Che brivido ragazzi (Durium, Ld A 6976)
- 1966 – Sei poco intelligente/Un pezzetto di ghiaccio (Century, AM 006)
- 1967 – Forse/La colpa più grande (DKF Folklore, KF 30038)
- 1969 – È troppo tardi/Va via (Kansas, dm 1114)
- 1981 – Georgia on my mind/Temptation/Stardust (Manhattan Records Man, 45002)
