= I Nuovi Angeli =

Italian pop band

- Origin: Milan, Italy
- Genres: Dance-pop, easy listening, beat
- Years active: 1966–present

I Nuovi Angeli ("The New Angels") were an Italian pop band formed in 1966 in Milan. The name refers to the eponymous drama film directed by Ugo Gregoretti in 1962.

== Biography ==
I Nuovi Angeli formed in 1966 from the merging of two bands – Paki & Paki (a pop duo formed in Milan by Pasquale Canzi and Pasquale Andriola) and an instrumental trio from Alessandria consisting of Alberto Pasetti (bass), Renato Sabbioni (guitar) and Franco Verde (drums). The band, initially called Paki & Paki and I Nuovi Angeli, achieved some success when their first single, L'ora più lunga (1966), which was adopted as the opening theme for the RAI TV show "La fiera dei sogni" hosted by Mike Bongiorno.

In 1967 Andriola and Verde left the project due to creative differences, and the band was simply renamed I Nuovi Angeli. Augmented by The New Dada former drummer Riki Rebaioli and lead singer Alfredo Gatti, I Nuovi Angeli recorded two more singles characterized by a beat production. In the late 1960s, following the departure of Gatti, the group replaced Rebaioli with Mauro Paoluzzi and left Durium Records to sign with Polygram. The move coincided with a change of musical direction, with the band turning towards the bubblegum genre.

The classic line-up of I Nuovi Angeli peaked in the early 1970s, thanks to a string of top-ten hits written by Renato Pareti and Roberto Vecchioni, including Donna Felicità (1971), Uakadi Uakadù (1971), Singapore (1972) and Anna da dimenticare (1973). In 1971 I Nuovi Angeli embarked on an Australian tour organised by the impresario Duane Zigliotto and a North-American tour and made their first TV appearance in America on the Ed Sullivan Show. In 1974 I Nuovi Angeli recorded Stasera Clown, a concept album in collaboration with the La Scala Orchestra revolving around the life of a group of circus artists.

With the advent of disco and punk music, I Nuovi Angeli experienced a decline in popularity. In 1978 Paoluzzi left the band to pursue a successful career as producer, songwriter session musician, collaborating with artists like Gianna Nannini and Patty Pravo. Sabbioni and Pasetti left the band a few months later and retired from the music industry. Canzi decided to continue with new musicians.

In 2005 the original members of I Nuovi Angeli met to discuss the possibility of a reunion. The band played a few warm-up gigs and recorded a double live album, "Il nostro concerto" but tragedy struck when Alberto Pasetti suddenly died at the age of 54. Following a legal battle between Sabbioni and Canzi over the property of the name I Nuovi Angeli, Canzi temporarily left the group. Despite numerous lineup changes, the band continued to perform until Canzi passed away in 2026.

== Personnel ==
=== Classic Line-Up ===
- Paki Canzi - vocals, piano
- Alberto Pasetti - guitar
- Renato Sabbioni - bass
- Mauro Paoluzzi - drums

== Discography ==
=== Studio albums ===
- 1969 – I Nuovi Angeli
- 1969 – Un quarto di vita (Note: (The album was republished in 1971 with the title Sole buonanotte!).)
- 1972 – Uakadi Uakadu
- 1973 – Troppo bella per restare sola
- 1973 – Anna da dimenticare
- 1974 – Stasera Clown
- 1976 – I Nuovi Angeli

=== Live albums ===
- 1999 - Live
- 2008 - Il nostro concerto (2 CD)
- 2011 - DVD Live Show (also DVD)

=== Greatest Hits albums ===
- 1990 – Voliamo ancora
- 1995 – Una storia che continua
- 2000 – Canta Italia
- 2012 – C'è ancora posto in paradiso
- 2016 – Tete à tete con i Nuovi Angeli

=== Selected singles ===
- 1966 – L'ora più lunga
- 1967 – Per vivere insieme
- 1968 – Questo è un addio
- 1969 – Ragazzina ragazzina
- 1970 – Color cioccolata
- 1971 – Donna Felicità
- 1971 – Sole, buonanotte
- 1971 – Uakadi Uakadù
- 1972 – Un viaggio in Inghilterra
- 1972 – Singapore
- 1973 – La povera gente
- 1973 – Anna da dimenticare
- 1974 – Carovana
- 1975 – Stanza dei miracoli
- 1976 – Mamma luna
- 1977 – Piccoli amanti
- 1979 – Now
- 1980 – Angelo Balù
- 1984 – Io sto bene con te
- 1987 – Voi del '96
- 1988 – Soli soli
- 1989 – Bella questa storia
