= Rosy =

Rosy is a given name or nickname and, more rarely, a surname. It may refer to:

== People ==
=== Given name ===
- Rosy Afsari (1946?–2007), actress in the Bangladeshi film industry
- Rosy Akbar, Fijian politician who assumed office in 2014
- P K Rosy (1903–1988), Indian Malayalam actress
- Rosy Armen (born 1939), French singer of Armenian descent
- Rosy Lamb (born 1973), expatriate American sculptor and painter
- Rosy Parlane, male electronic musician from New Zealand
- Rosy Pereira (born 1951), Indonesian-Dutch pop singer, half of the duo Rosy & Andres

=== Nickname or stage name ===
- Rosy Bindi (born 1951), Italian politician and current President of the Antimafia Commission
- Rosy Buchanan (born 1961), Australian politician
- James “Rosy” McHargue (1902–1999), American jazz clarinetist
- Rosy Ocampo (born 1959), Mexican television producer and director
- James Roosevelt Roosevelt (1854–1927), AKA "Rosy" Roosevelt, American diplomat and half-brother of Franklin Delano Roosevelt
- Rudy Rosatti or “Rosy” Rosatti (1895–1975), American National Football League player
- Aaron "Rosy" Rosenberg (1912–1979), two-time "All-American" college football player, and film and television producer
- Wilfred “Rosy” Ryan (1898–1980), American Major League Baseball pitcher
- Bernadine Rose “Rosy” Senanayake (born 1958), Sri Lankan politician, activist and beauty queen
- Rosy Varte (1923–2012), French actress born Nevarte Manouelian
- Rosalie “Rosy” Wertheim (1888–1949), Dutch pianist, music educator and composer

=== Surname ===
- Maurice Rosy (1927–2013), Belgian comics writer and artistic director of Spirou
- Quazi Rosy (1949–2022), Bangladeshi poet and politician

== Fictional characters ==
=== Given Name ===
- Rosy Ryan, the title character of the 1970 film Ryan's Daughter, played by Sarah Miles
- a character in the 1995 film Balto

=== Surname ===
- Amy Rose, a fictional character in Sonic the Hedgehog video games originally nicknamed Rosy the Rascal

== See also ==
- Rosie (given name)
