= I Gufi =

Italian musical and comedy ensemble

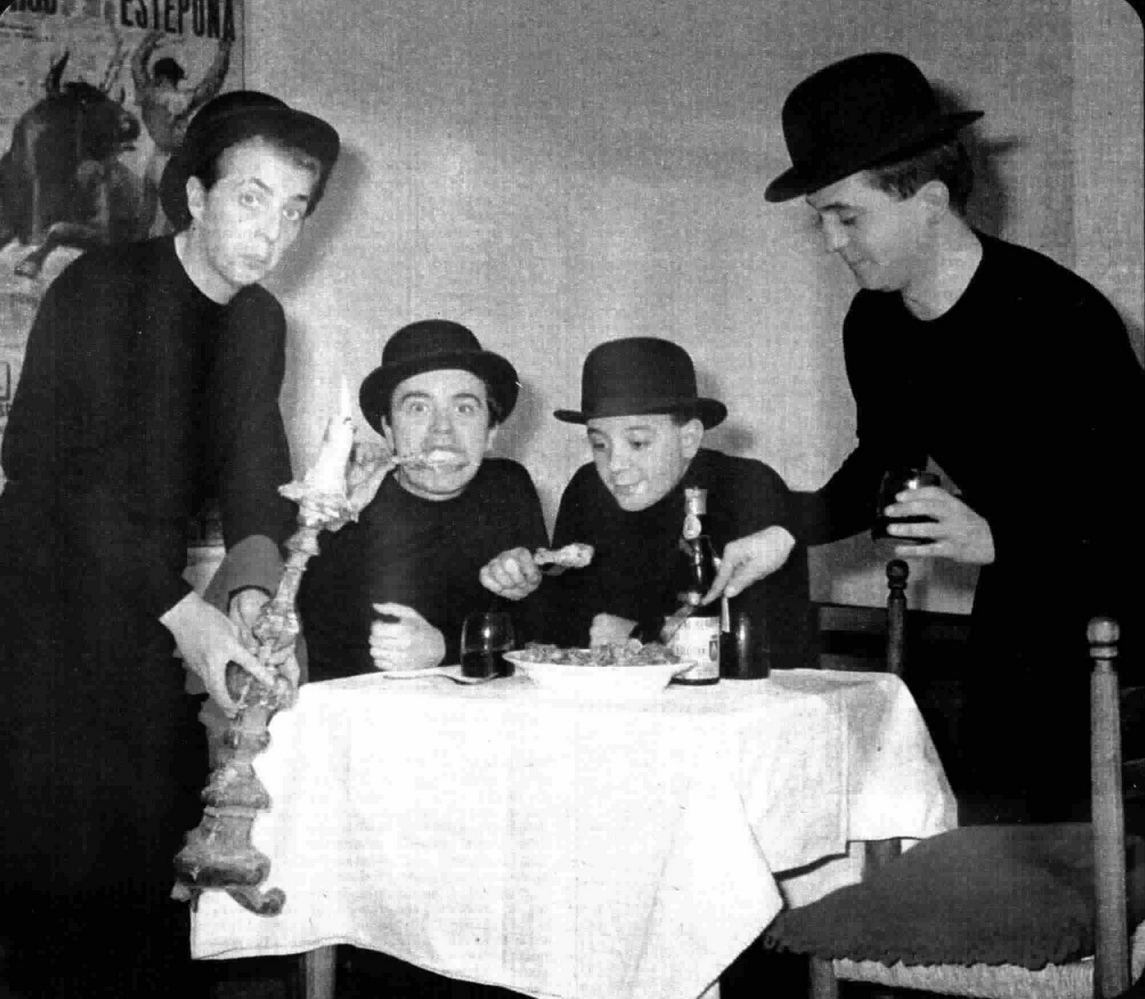
I Gufi in Radiocorriere magazine, 1966. (l-r) Gianni Magni, Roberto Brivio, Nanni Svampa, Lino Patruno.

I Gufi ("The Owls", also spelled just as Gufi) was an Italian musical and comedy ensemble, mainly successful in the second half of the 1960s.

== Career ==
The group formed in Milan between 1963 and 1964, and debuted on stage with the show "I Gufi cantano due secoli di Resistenza" (i.e. "The Owls sing Two Centuries of Resistance"). With a repertoire which mixed comical sketches and songs and characterized by satirical themes and black humor, I Gufi had their breakout in 1966 with the show "Il teatrino dei Gufi" (i.e. "The Little Theater of the Owls"), which extensively toured across Italy. The same year they started appearing in a number of RAI television shows, where their blue material encountered some censorship issues.

After undergoing a legal complaint for foul language for the song "Sant’Antonio allu desertu" (St. Anthony in the Desert), from which they were acquitted, between 1967 and 1969 the group got further success with the shows "Non so, non ho visto, se c'ero dormivo" (I don't know, I didn't see anything, and if I was there, I was asleep) and "Non spingete, scappiamo anche noi" (Don't push, we are running away too). Following the album Il Balilla, in 1971 the group disbanded because of some personal conflicts among the members. For about a decade, the four Gufi pursued solo projects. Gianni Magni embarked on a successful career as stand-up comedian and film actor. Nanni Svampa recorded a few albums re-interpreting songs by Georges Brassens in the Milanese dialect. Lino Patruno became a full-time jazz guitarist, recording and performing with musicians such as Dan Barrett, Bill Coleman, Bud Freeman and Frank Tate; Roberto Brivio continued to work in theatre. In 1981 Gufi briefly reunited in 1981 for "I Gufi a colori" (The Owls in Colour), a series of television shows on Antenna 3 Lombardia.

== Personnel ==
- Roberto Brivio (Milan, 21 February 1938 - 22 January 2021) – guitar, accordion and vocals
- Gianni Magni (Milan, 16 May 1941 – Milan, 16 July 1992) – vocals
- Lino Patruno (Crotone, 27 October 1935) – guitar, banjo, bass and vocals
- Nanni Svampa (Milan, 28 February 1938 – Varese, 26 August 2017) - guitar, piano and vocals

== Discography ==
Albums

- 1965 – Milano canta
- 1965 – Il cabaret dei Gufi
- 1965 – I Gufi cantano due secoli di resistenza
- 1966 – Il teatrino dei Gufi
- 1966 – I Gufi
- 1966 - Milano canta n° 2
- 1966 – Il teatrino dei Gufi n°. 2
- 1967 – Il cabaret dei Gufi n. 2
- 1967 – Il teatrino dei Gufi in TV
- 1967 – Non so non ho visto se c'ero dormivo
- 1968 – Milano canta n°. 3
- 1968 – Il cabaret dei Gufi, vol. 3
- 1969 – Non spingete, scappiamo anche noi
- 1971 – La Balilla
- 1981 – I Gufi
