= Maeva =

Maeva or Maëva is a feminine given name. Notable people with the name include:

- Maëva Charbonnier (born 1991), French synchronized swimmer
- Maëva Contion (born 1992), French hurdler
- Maëva Coucke (born 1994), French model and Miss France 2018
- Maeva Douma (born 2005), Cameroonian cricketer
- Maeva Marcus, American historian
- Maeva Sarrasin (born 1987), Swiss women's footballer
- Maëva Squiban (born 2002), French cyclist

== See also ==
- 3916 Maeva, a main-belt asteroid
