= Rino Salviati =

Italian singer, guitarist and film actor

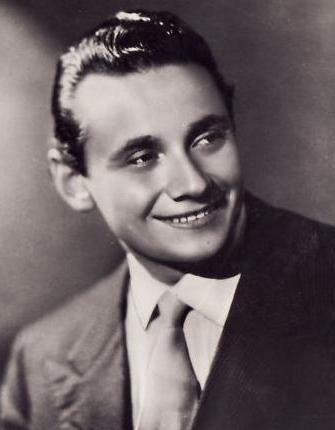
- Born: Gastone Tisalvi; 12 June 1922; Montelibretti, Italy
- Died: 2 January 2016 (aged 93); Rome, Italy
- Occupation: Singer

Gastone Tisalvi, best known as Rino Salviati (12 June 1922 – 2 January 2016) was an Italian singer, guitarist and film actor.

== Life and career ==
Born in Montelibretti, Salviati started his career in 1940, performing in a series of shows for the armed forces. In 1945 he entered the stage company of Erminio Macario, as the musical attraction in the revue Venticello del sud. The same year he started recording several albums for La Voce del Padrone.

After performing with various orchestras, Salviati became well-known as a regular in a popular radio program about guitarists. Starting from the 1950s, he toured all over the world, often alongside Nilla Pizzi. He also appeared in a number of films.

== Selected filmography ==
- Milanese in Naples (1954)
