= Tullio Mobiglia =

Italian jazz saxophonist (1911–1991)

Tullio Mobiglia (April 12, 1911 – July 24, 1991) was an Italian jazz saxophonist and bandleader. He was born in Carezzano, and died, aged 80, in Helsinki.

== Orchestras of Tullio Mobiglia ==
=== 1941 - 1943 (in Germany) ===
- Tullio Mobiglia: tenor sax
- Alfredo Marzaroli: trumpet
- Francesco Paolo Ricci: alto sax, baritone sax, clarinet
- Eraldo Romanoni: piano
- Alfio Grasso: guitar
- Carlo Pecori: double-bass, flute
- Angelo Bartole: drums

=== 1945 (Italy) ===
- Tullio Mobiglia: tenor sax
- Arturo Botti: tenor sax
- Giovanni Bocchia: alto sax, clarinet
- Gino Ravera: alto sax
- Vittorio Pavone: trumpet
- Elettro Bartolucci: trumpet
- Giovanni Vallarino: trombone
- Mario Midana: trombone
- Luciano Gambini: piano
- Renzo Chiodi: guitar
- Greco Maselli: double-bass
- Renato Catellacci: drums

=== 1946 (Italy) ===
- Tullio Mobiglia: tenor sax
- Luigi Borromeo: tenor sax
- Giovanni Bocchia: alto sax, clarinet
- Arrigo Pagnini: alto sax, clarinet
- Vittorio Pavone: trumpet
- Elettro Bartolucci: trumpet
- Giovanni Vallarino: trumpet
- Mario Midana: trombone
- Gianni Manzotti: piano
- Renzo Chiodi: guitar
- Greco Maselli: double-bass
- Renato Catellacci: drums

== Partial discography ==
=== 33 rpm ===
- 1973: The Charleston's Aces (Durium; with Mario Pezzotta)
- 1974: L'era del night (Durium; with Mario Pezzotta)

=== 78 rpm ===
- 1949: Ballate col bajon/Cuban mambo (Columbia)
- 1946 (26.4.1946) Rhumboogie - Southern Fried (Telefunken)

=== EP ===
- 1957: The Deep Blue Sea (Durium, ep A 3034; with Carlo Savina)

=== 45 rpm ===
- 1961: Avventure di Capri/Italian Serenade (Durium, Ld A 7022)
- 1961: 'O sole mio/Maria Marì (Durium, Ld A 7023)
- 1961: Piccola/Do-re-mi cantare (Durium, Ld A 7024)
- 1961: Carolina dai!/Rosina (Durium, Ld A 7025)

=== CD ===
- 2001 -The complete Tullio Mobiglia (1941-1946) (Riviera Jazz Records, RJR CD 004)
