= Danielle =

- Gender: Female
- Language: English; French

Origin
- Origin: Hebrew
- Meaning: "God is my judge"

Other names
- Related names: Daniel; Daniele; Daniella; Danijela

Danielle is a modern French feminine variant of the masculine name Daniel. Daniëlle is a Dutch version of the name.

== People ==
=== Danielle ===
- Danielle Adams (born 1989), American basketball player
- Danielle Allen (born 1971), American classicist and political scientist
- Danielle Andersen (born 1984), American professional poker player
- Danielle Anderson (born 1986), American singer
- Danielle Ammaccapane (born 1965), American professional golfer
- Danielle Arbid (born 1970), Lebanese film director
- Danielle Arciniegas (born 1992), Colombian actress
- Danielle Santos Atkinson (born 1984), American basketball coach
- Danielle Bell, American politician
- Danielle Bidard-Reydet (born 1939), French teacher and politician
- Danielle Bradbery (born 1992), American singer
- Danielle Bregoli (born 2003), American rapper and internet personality
- Danielle Brooks (born 1989), American actress and singer
- Danielle Brown (brown 1988), British athlete and author
- Danielle Bunten Berry (1949–1998), American videogame designer
- Danielle Bux (born 1979), Welsh actress and model
- Danielle Campbell (born 1995), American actress
- Danielle Carter (disambiguation), several people
- Danielle Chuchran (born 1993), American actress
- Danielle Colby (born 1975), American reality television personality
- Danielle Collins (born 1993), American tennis player
- Danielle Collins (cricketer) (born 2000), English cricketer
- Danielle Crockrom (born 1981), American basketball player
- Danielle Cummings (born 1997), American paratriathlete
- Danielle Darrieux (1917–2017), French actress and singer
- Danielle Dax (born 1958), English musician
- Danielle Deadwyler (born 1981 or 1982), American actress and writer
- Danielle Deckard (born 1989), American singer/songwriter
- Danielle Egnew (born 1969), American musician and actress
- Danielle Etienne (born 2001), Haitian footballer
- Danielle Eubank (born 1968), American painter
- Danielle Valore Evans, American writer
- Danielle Fishel (born 1981), American actress
- Danielle Foote (born 1987), Australian television personality
- Danielle Frenkel (born 1987), Israeli high jumper
- Danielle Galligan (born 1992), Irish actress and theatre maker
- Danielle Goldstein (born 1985), American-Israeli show jumper
- Danielle Haim (born 1989), American musician
- Danielle Tumminio Hansen (born 1981), American writer, intellectual, theologian, and Episcopal priest
- Dani Harmer (born Danielle Jane Harmer, 1989), English actress and television personality
- Danielle Harold (born 1992), English actress
- Danielle Harris (born 1977), American actress
- Danielle Hope (born 1992), English actress and singer
- Danielle Howle, American singer-songwriter and music producer
- Danielle Hunter (born 1994), American football player
- Riley Keough (born Danielle Riley Keough, 1989), American actress
- Danielle Licari (born 1936), French singer
- Danielle Lloyd (born 1983), English model and television personality
- Danielle Marcano (born 1997), American soccer player
- Danielle MacDonald (born 1991), Australian actress
- Danielle Marsh (born 2005), Australian and South Korean singer
- Danielle Martin (born 1975), Canadian politician
- Danielle McCann, Canadian politician
- Danielle McEwan (born 1991), American ten-pin bowler
- Dannii Minogue (born Danielle Jane Minogue, 1971), Australian singer, actress, and television personality
- Danielle Mitterrand (1924–2011), French liaison officer in the French Resistance and wife of French President François Mitterrand
- Danielle Nicolet (born 1973), American actress
- Danielle de Niese (born 1979), Australian-American opera singer
- Danielle O'Brien (born 1990), Australian competitive ice dancer
- Danielle Ofri, American essayist, editor, and internist
- Danielle O'Toole (born 1994), American softball player
- Danielle Friel Otten, American politician
- Danielle Outlaw (born 1976), American law enforcement officer
- Danielle Page (born 1986), American-Serbian basketball player
- Danielle Panabaker (born 1987), American actress and director
- Danielle Ponter (born 2000), Australian rules footballer
- Danielle Ponder (born 1982), American musician and lawyer
- Danielle Posthuma (born 1972), Dutch statistical geneticist
- Danielle Georgette Reddé (1911–2007), French resistance member during World War II
- Danielle Renfrew (born 1973), American film producer
- Danielle Robinson (born 1989), American basketball player
- Danielle Rodriguez (born 1992), American basketball coach and player
- Danielle Rose Russell (born 1999), American actress
- Danielle Rowe (born 1982), Australian ballet dancer and choreographer
- Danielle Rowley (born 1990), Scottish politician
- Danielle Sassoon, American attorney
- Danielle Savre (born 1988), American actress
- Danielle Scott-Arruda (born 1971), American-Brazilian volleyball player
- Danielle Serdachny (born 2001), Canadian ice hockey player
- Danielle Smith (born 1971), Canadian politician
- Danielle Spencer (American actress) (1965–2025), American actress
- Danielle Spencer (Australian actress) (born 1969), Australian singer and actress
- Danielle Staub (born 1962), American television personality
- Danielle Steel (born 1947), American writer
- Danielle Steers (born 1991), English stage actress and singer-songwriter
- Danielle St James (born 1992), English model, entrepreneur and campaigner
- Danielle Trzcinski, American actress and comedian
- Danielle Varda, American politician
- Danielle Vega (born 1986), American actress
- Danielle Walker (disambiguation), several people
- Danielle Wong (born 1993), Malaysian Chinese model and beauty pageant titleholder

=== Daniëlle ===
- Daniëlle Bekkering (born 1976), Dutch speed skater and cyclist
- Daniëlle de Bruijn (born 1978), Dutch water polo player
- Daniëlle van de Donk (born 1991), Dutch footballer
- Daniëlle Hirsch (born 1968), Dutch politician
- Daniëlle Jansen (born 1970), Dutch politician
- Daniëlle Overgaag (born 1973), Dutch road cyclist
- Daniëlle van Rossem (born 1935), Dutch fencer
- Daniëlle Vriezema (born 1977), Dutch judoka

== Fictional characters ==
- Danielle De Barbarac, main character in the film Ever After
- Danielle Cage, a Marvel Comics character
- Danielle Favre, the French student in Mind Your Language
- Danielle Jones, on the British soap opera EastEnders
- Danielle Moonstar, in Marvel Comics
- Danielle Rousseau, in the American television series Lost
