= Posthuma =

Posthuma may refer to

- Posthuma (surname)
- Opera Posthuma, a 1677 collection of posthumous works of Baruch Spinoza
- Nebria posthuma, a species of ground beetle
