= Danieley =

Danieley is a surname. Notable people with the surname include:

- James Danieley (1924–2016), American academic administrator
- Jason Danieley (born 1971), American actor, singer, concert performer, and recording artist

== See also ==
- Daniele
