= List of cover versions of Whitney Houston songs =

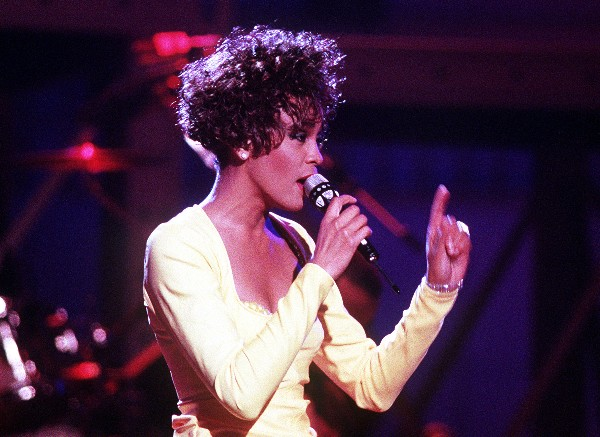
Many artists have covered Whitney Houston's hits over the years.

This is a list of notable music artists who have recorded one or more songs originally recorded by American singer and actress Whitney Houston. Many artists started covering her songs as early as the 1980s. These covers are in several different languages and genres, and some have received positive reviews from music critics and featured on record charts.

Known as "the Voice", Houston was one of the most significant icons of the 20th century as well as one of the best-selling music artists of all time. Houston has influenced and inspired various number of artists all over the world. Producer, musician, and former American Idol judge Randy Jackson named Houston as the voice of the modern musical era, further labeling her as "the voice of a generation". Houston was widely credited with reviving the power ballad, and in doing so reshaping the adult contemporary radio format, making it one of the most popular formats of the 1990s and the early 2000s.

Her emergence in the mid-1980s as a vocalist in popular music had a significant impact on the era of powerhouse vocals, power ballads, and contemporary R&B, spanning roughly from the mid-1980s to the early 2000s.

Houston is the most covered female artist in the history of American Idol with over 50 covers of her music performed during the show, only behind Stevie Wonder, The Beatles and Elton John. Houston's 1993 hit "I Have Nothing" is the most performed song from an artist on the show, having been covered during the main show 14 times.

Houston was covered several times in the Glee tribute episode dedicated to her, "Dance with Somebody", which aired a couple months after Houston's death in 2012.

Artists who have done cover versions of Houston's popular renditions of other artists' songs are not included.

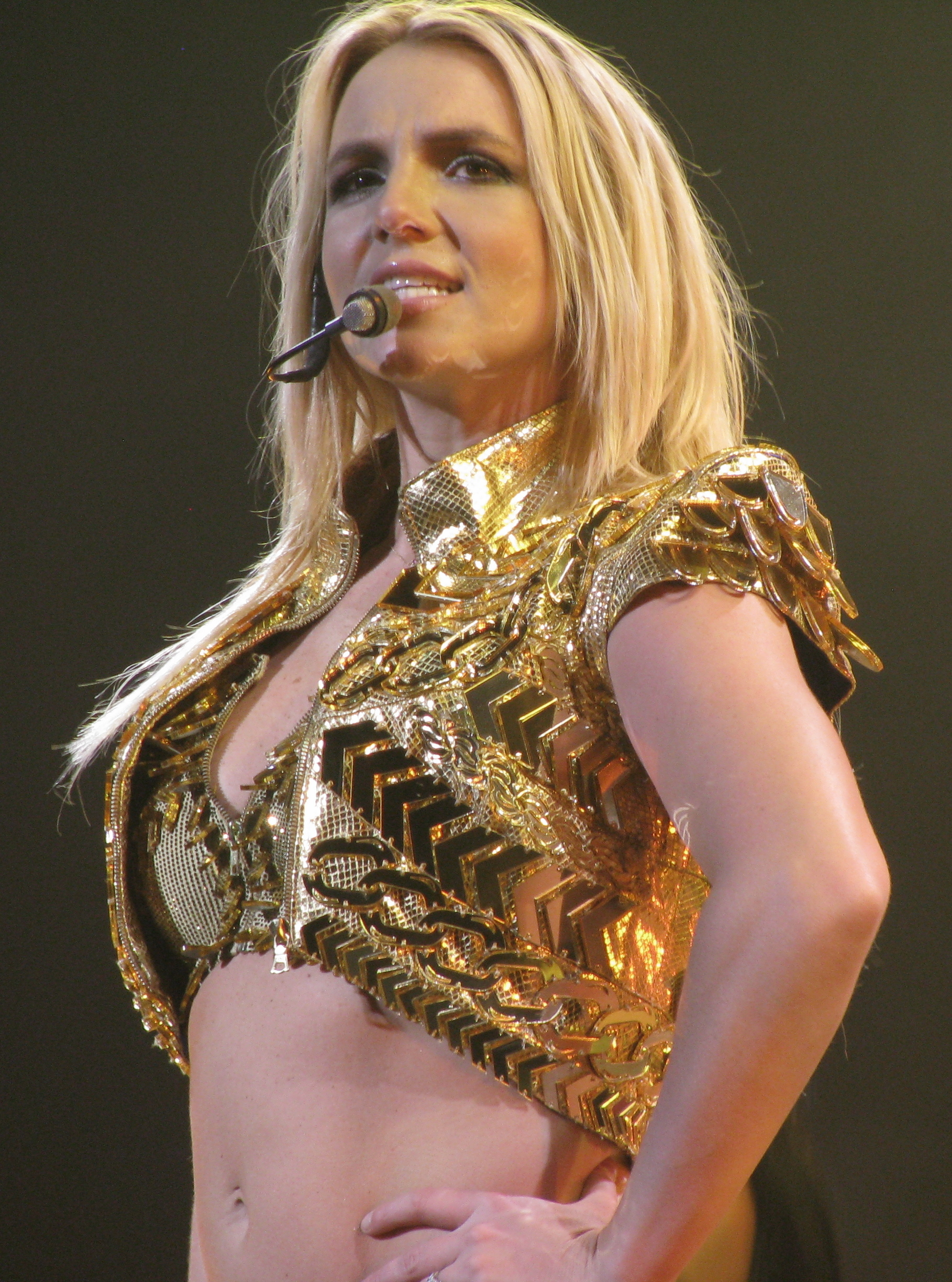
Britney Spears earned her recording deal after covering one of Houston's songs in an audition.

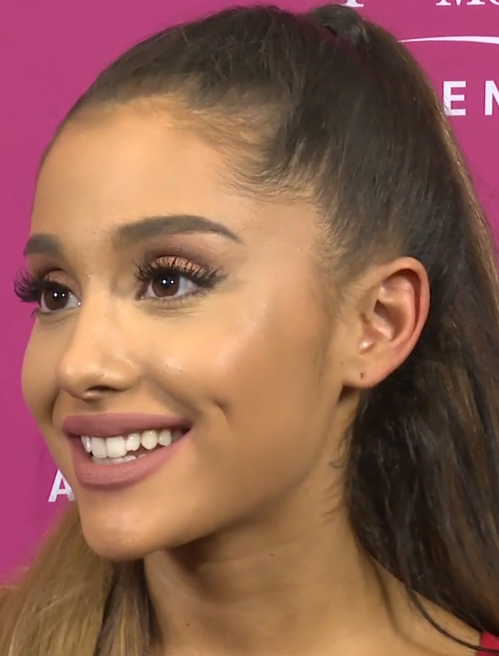
Ariana Grande has covered Houston songs live in concert.

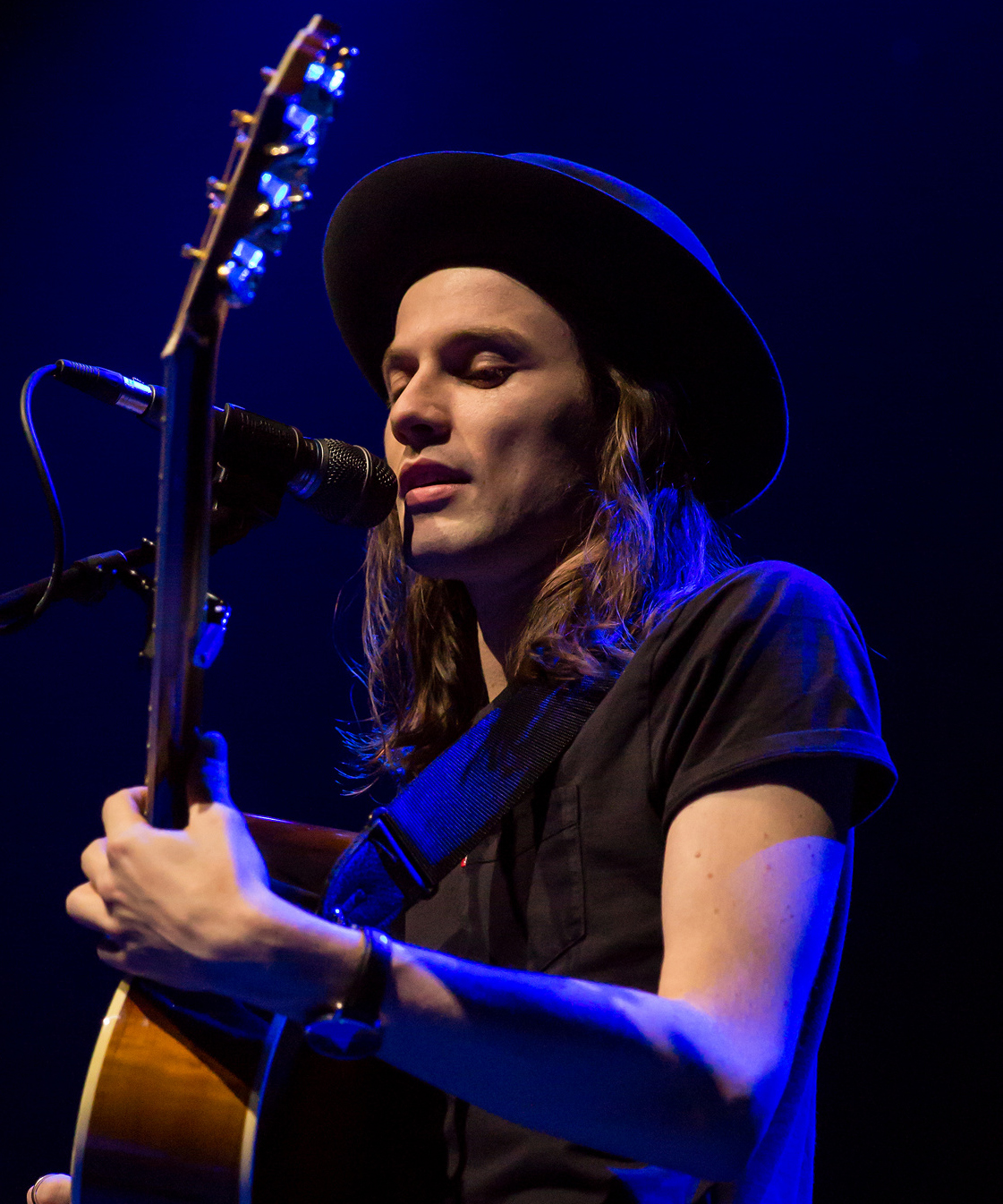
James Bay covered Houston during his concert in 2020.

== Selected list ==
Artist	Country of origin	First Year of Appearance	Song	Appearance(s)	Note(s)
AaRON	France	2021	"I Wanna Dance with Somebody (Who Loves Me)"	Single	
Ahmir	United States	2009	"Like I Never Left"	Album	
Ahmir	United States	2021	"Where Do Broken Hearts Go"	Music video	
Aegis	Philippines	2009	"One Moment in Time"	Album	
Aegis	Philippines	2009	"Run to You"	Album	
Afro Blue	United States	2011	"I Wanna Dance with Somebody (Who Loves Me)"	Album	
Aiden James	United Kingdom	2013	"I Wanna Dance with Somebody (Who Loves Me)"	Single	
Albert Hammond	United States	1989	"One Moment in Time"	Album	
Alex Newell	United States	2020	"I Look to You"	Television show	
Alexandra Burke	United Kingdom	2015	"Queen of the Night"	Album	
Alexandra Burke	United Kingdom	2015	"How Will I Know"	Album	
Alexandra Burke	United Kingdom	2015	"I'm Your Baby Tonight"	Album	
Alexandra Burke	United Kingdom	2015	"Oh Yes"	Album	
Alexandra Burke	United Kingdom	2015	"Run to You"	Album	
Alexandra Burke	United Kingdom	2015	"I Have Nothing"	Album	
Alexandra Burke	United Kingdom	2015	"All at Once"	Album	
Alexandra Burke	United Kingdom	2015	"One Moment in Time"	Album	
Amber Riley; JoJo; Muni Long	United States	2023	"Heartbreak Hotel"	Live performance	
Andie Case	United States	2019	"I Have Nothing"	Single	
Andrea Faustini	United Kingdom	2014	"One Moment in Time"	Live performance	
Andrea Faustini	United Kingdom	2014	"I Have Nothing"	Live performance	
Andrea Faustini	United Kingdom	2015	"I Didn't Know My Own Strength"	Album	
Anne Murray	Canada	1984	"Take Good Care of My Heart"	Album	
Anthony Callea	Australia	2016	"How Will I Know"	Album	
Anthony Callea	Australia	2016	"I Wanna Dance with Somebody (Who Loves Me)"	Album	
Arkells	Canada	2024	"I Wanna Dance with Somebody (Who Loves Me)"	Album	
Ariana Grande	United States	2015	"I Have Nothing"	Live performance	
Ariana Grande	United States	2016	"How Will I Know"	Live performance	
Ariana Grande	United States	2016	"Queen of the Night"	Live performance	
Ashley Tisdale	United States	2008	"I Wanna Dance with Somebody (Who Loves Me)"	Album	
Asta; Allday	Australia	2015	"I Wanna Dance with Somebody (Who Loves Me)"	Live performance	
Babyface; Beverly Crowder	United States	1997	"Exhale (Shoop Shoop)"	Album	
Ben Rector	United States	2014	"I Wanna Dance with Somebody (Who Loves Me)"	Album	
Bianca Ryan	United States	2021	"I Have Nothing"	YouTube	
Billy Steinberg; Tom Kelly	United States	1988	"So Emotional"	Demo	
Blossoms	United Kingdom	2024	"I Wanna Dance with Somebody (Who Loves Me)"	Album	
Bootstraps	United States	2014	"I Wanna Dance with Somebody (Who Loves Me)"	Album	
Boy Meets Girl	United States	1988	"I Wanna Dance with Somebody (Who Loves Me)"	Demo	
Boy Meets Girl	United States	2022	"How Will I Know"	Album	
Boyce Avenue	United States	2012	"I Look to You"	Album	
Boyce Avenue	United States	2022	"I Wanna Dance with Somebody (Who Loves Me)"	Single	
Brandy	United States	2012	"I'm Your Baby Tonight"	Live performance	
Brandy	United States	2012	"I Wanna Dance with Somebody (Who Loves Me)"	Live performance	
Brian Justin Crum	United States	2021	"I Have Nothing"	Album	
Brian McKnight	United States	2012	"I Have Nothing"	Live performance	
Britney Spears	United States	1997	"I Have Nothing"	Audition	
Cass Phang	China	1993	"Run to You"	Album	
CeCe Winans	United States	1997	"You Were Loved"	Live performance	
CHVRCHES	United Kingdom	2013	"It's Not Right but It's Okay"	Live performance	
Christina Aguilera	United States	2001	"Run to You"	Live performance	
Christina Aguilera	United States	2017	"I Have Nothing"	Live performance	
Claire Richards	United Kingdom	2023	"So Emotional"	Album	
Claybourne Elder	United States	2026	"I Wanna Dance with Somebody (Who Loves Me)"	Album	
Conor Maynard	United Kingdom	2022	"I Wanna Dance with Somebody (Who Loves Me)"	Single	
Corneille	Canada	2017	"I Wanna Dance with Somebody (Who Loves Me)"	Single	
Craig David	United Kingdom	2019	"It's Not Right but It's Okay"	Live performance	
Cynthia Erivo	United Kingdom	2021	"I Wanna Dance with Somebody (Who Loves Me)"	Live performance	
Dana Winner	Belgium	2016	"One Moment in Time"	Live performance	
Danielle Ate the Sandwich	United States	2019	"I Wanna Dance with Somebody (Who Loves Me)"	YouTube	
Danielle Deckard	United States	2017	"I Wanna Dance with Somebody (Who Loves Me)"	Album	
Danny Chan	China	1986	"How Will I Know"	Album	
David Byrne	United States	2007	"I Wanna Dance with Somebody (Who Loves Me)"	Album	
David Garrett	Germany	2017	"One Moment in Time"	Album	
David Phelps	United States	2021	"I Have Nothing"	Album	
Deborah Cox	United States	2017	"I Have Nothing"	Album	
Deborah Cox	United States	2017	"I Wanna Dance with Somebody (Who Loves Me)"	Album	
Deborah Cox	United States	2017	"Run to You"	Album	
Demetria McKinney	United States	2017	"You Give Good Love"	Album	
Demi Lovato	United States	2025	"I Wanna Dance with Somebody (Who Loves Me)"	Live performance	
Diandra	Finland	2012	"I Have Nothing"	Album	
Eek-A-Mouse	Jamaica	2025	"I Wanna Dance with Somebody (Who Loves Me)"	Single	
Elise Testone	United States	2012	"I'm Your Baby Tonight"	Single	
Erato	Sweden	2019	"I Wanna Dance with Somebody (Who Loves Me)"	Album	
Erik Santos	Philippines	2015	"Where Do Broken Hearts Go"	Album	
Errol Brown	United Kingdom	2001	"My Love Is Your Love"	Album	
Evanescence	United States	2017	"I Wanna Dance with Somebody (Who Loves Me)"	Live performance	
Fall Out Boy	United States	2018	"I Wanna Dance with Somebody (Who Loves Me)	Spotify Singles	
Flip & Fill	United Kingdom	2003	"I Wanna Dance with Somebody (Who Loves Me)"	Single	
Gabby Barrett	United States	2017	"I Have Nothing"	Single	
Gary Barlow; Becky Hill	United Kingdom	2020	"I Wanna Dance with Somebody (Who Loves Me)"	Music video	
Gerard Joling	Netherlands	2015	"One Moment in Time"	Concert	
Glee Cast	United States	2010	"I Look to You"	Television show	
Glee Cast	United States	2012	"How Will I Know"	Television show	
Glee Cast	United States	2012	"I Wanna Dance with Somebody (Who Loves Me)"	Television show	
Glee Cast	United States	2012	"So Emotional"	Television show	
Glee Cast	United States	2012	"It's Not Right but It's Okay"	Television show	
Glee Cast	United States	2012	"I Have Nothing"	Television show	
Glee Cast	United States	2012	"My Love Is Your Love"	Television show	
Glennis Grace	Netherlands	2018	"All at Once"	Live performance	
Glennis Grace	Netherlands	2018	"How Will I Know"	Live performance	
Glennis Grace	Netherlands	2018	"If I Told You That"	Live performance	
Glennis Grace	Netherlands	2018	"I Have Nothing"	Live performance	
Glennis Grace	Netherlands	2018	"It's Not Right but It's Okay"	Live performance	
Glennis Grace	Netherlands	2018	"I Wanna Dance with Somebody (Who Loves Me)"	Live performance	
Glennis Grace	Netherlands	2018	"One Moment in Time"	Live performance	
Glennis Grace	Netherlands	2018	"So Emotional"	Live performance	
Glennis Grace	Netherlands	2018	"When You Believe"	Live performance	
Glennis Grace	Netherlands	2018	"Where Do Broken Hearts Go"	Live performance	
Glennis Grace	Netherlands	2019	"Count on Me"	Live performance	
Glennis Grace	Netherlands	2019	"My Love Is Your Love"	Live performance	
Haley Reinhart	United States	2011	"I'm Your Baby Tonight"	Single	
Haley Scarnato	United States	2007	"Queen of the Night"	Live performance	
Heather Headley	Trinidad	2012	"Run to You"	Album	
Helena Vondráčková	Czech Republic	1988	"I Wanna Dance with Somebody (Who Loves Me)"	Album	
Helena Vondráčková	Czech Republic	1997	"Run to You"	Album	
Helena Vondráčková	Czech Republic	2009	"Queen of the Night"	Album	
Hit the Lights	United States	2008	"How Will I Know"	Album	
Il Divo	Italy	2023	"I Have Nothing"	Album	
Illuminati Hotties	United States	2019	"I Wanna Dance with Somebody (Who Loves Me)"	Single	
Jack Vidgen	Australia	2011	"I Have Nothing"	Album	
Jake Zyrus	Philippines	2008	"I Have Nothing"	Album	
Jake Zyrus	Philippines	2009	"You'll Never Stand Alone"	Single	
Jahméne	United Kingdom	2013	"I Look to You"	Album	
James Bay	United Kingdom	2020	"I Wanna Dance with Somebody (Who Loves Me)"	Concert	
Jane McDonald	United Kingdom	1998	"One Moment in Time"	Album	
Jason Chen	United States	2023	"I Have Nothing"	Single	
Jazmine Sullivan	United States	2015	"I Have Nothing"	Live performance	
Jeffrey Osborne	United States	2005	"All at Once"	Album	
Jennifer Hudson	United States	2004	"I Have Nothing"	Live performance	
Jessica Sanchez	United States	2012	"How Will I Know"	Single	
Jessica Sanchez	United States	2012	"I Have Nothing"	Single	
Jessie J	United Kingdom	2011	"I Wanna Dance with Somebody (Who Loves Me)"	Live performance	
Jessie J	United Kingdom	2017	"I Have Nothing"	Live performance	
Joe McElderry	United Kingdom	2012	"I Look to You"	Album	
John "Jellybean" Benitez	United States	1991	"Love Is a Talking Sport"	Album	
Johnny Mathis; Kenny G	United States	2017	"Run to You"	Album	
Kaitlyn Aurelia Smith	United States	2022	"I Wanna Dance with Somebody (Who Loves Me)"	Spotify Singles	
Katharine McPhee	United States	2006	"I Have Nothing"	Live performance	
Katharine McPhee	United States	2010	"Who Would Imagine a King"	Album	
Kathy Troccoli	United States	1994	"Takin' a Chance"	Album	
Katie Noonan	Australia	2020	"I Wanna Dance with Somebody (Who Loves Me)"	Album	
Katy Perry	United States	2011	"I Wanna Dance with Somebody (Who Loves Me)"	Concert	
Keiko Lee	Japan	2009	"I Look to You"	Album	
Kelly Clarkson	United States	2022	"Queen of the Night"	Album	
Kelly Clarkson	United States	2025	"I Have Nothing"	Television show	
Kelly Clarkson	United States	2025	"I'm Your Baby Tonight"	Television show	
Keri Hilson	United States	2011	"I Have Nothing"	Live performance	
Kidz Bop Kids	United States	2001	"My Love Is Your Love"	Album	
Kidz Bop Kids	United States	2020	"I Wanna Dance with Somebody (Who Loves Me)"	Album	
L'Impératrice	France	2021	"I Wanna Dance with Somebody (Who Loves Me)"	Single	
LaKisha Jones	United States	2009	"You Give Good Love"	Album	
Leah LaBelle	United States	2008	"I Have Nothing"	Live performance	
Leanne Mitchell	United Kingdom	2012	"Run to You"	Single	
Ledisi; Jordin Sparks; Melanie Fiona	United States	2012	"How Will I Know"	Live performance	
Lee Towers	Netherlands	1992	"One Moment in Time"	Album	
Leo Moracchioli	Norway	2018	"I Wanna Dance with Somebody (Who Loves Me)"	Album	
Lola Young	United Kingdom	2020	"I Wanna Dance with Somebody (Who Loves Me)"	Apple Music Sessions	
Lorde	New Zealand	2017	"I Wanna Dance with Somebody (Who Loves Me)"	Concert	
Lucy Thomas	United Kingdom	2020	"I Have Nothing"	Album	
Lucy Thomas	United Kingdom	2022	"Run to You"	Album	
Lucy Thomas	United Kingdom	2024	"One Moment in Time"	Single	
Marian Hill	United States	2016	"I Wanna Dance with Somebody (Who Loves Me)"	Concert	
Marius Bear	Switzerland	2020	"I Wanna Dance with Somebody (Who Loves Me)"	Single	
Marius de Vries	United Kingdom	2015	"I Wanna Dance with Somebody (Who Loves Me)"	Soundtrack	
Matt Alber	United States	2012	"I Wanna Dance with Somebody *Who Loves Me)"	Single	
Me First and the Gimme Gimmes	United States	2003	"Where Do Broken Hearts Go"	Album	
Melanie Fiona	Canada	2012	"It's Not Right but It's Okay" "I Wanna Dance with Somebody (Who Loves Me)"	Live performance	
Mickey Guyton	United States	2016	"I Wanna Dance with Somebody (Who Loves Me)"	YouTube	
MMC	United States	1993	"I Have Nothing"	Television show	
Monica	United States	1998	"You Give Good Love"	Live performance	
Mr. Belt & Wezol	Netherlands	2024	"It's Not Right but It's Okay"	Single	
Music Travel Love	Canada	2023	"I Wanna Dance with Somebody (Who Loves Me)"	Single	
Nadéah	Australia/France	2026	"I Wanna Dance with Somebody (Who Loves Me)"	Album	
Natalie Cole	United States	1993	"Run to You" "I Have Nothing"	Live performance	
Natalie Grant	United States	2025	"Who Would Imagine a King"	Album	
Nestor	Sweden	2022	"I Wanna Dance with Somebody (Who Loves Me)"	Album	
Nora Aunor	Philippines	1991	"I'm Your Baby Tonight"	Album	
Novelists	France	2026	"I Have Nothing"	Music video	
One Voice Children's Choir	United States	2023	"I Wanna Dance with Somebody (Who Loves Me)"	Music video	
Orfeh; Andy Karl; Andrew Logan	United States	2017	"I'm Your Baby Tonight"	Album	
Out of the Blue	United Kingdom	2014	"I Wanna Dance with Somebody (Who Loves Me)"	Album	
Out of the Blue	United Kingdom	2015	"I Have Nothing"	Album	
Patti LaBelle	United States	1997	"I Have Nothing"	TV performance	
Paul Mauriat	France	1987	"Didn't We Almost Have It All"	Album	
Pentatonix	United States	2012	"How Will I Know"	Music video	
Peter Hofmann	Germany	1998	"One Moment in Time"	Album	
Philip Bailey	United States	1998	"Who Would Imagine a King"	Album	
Pia Toscano	United States	2011	"Where Do Broken Hearts Go"	Single	
Pliers	Jamaica	1988	"Didn't We Almost Have It All"	Album	
Pop Etc	United States	2012	"How Will I Know"	Album	
Rebel Wilson; Adam Devine; Priyanka Chopra	United States	2019	"I Wanna Dance with Somebody (Who Loves Me)"	Soundtrack	
Rivers Cuomo	United States	2019	"I Wanna Dance with Somebody (Who Loves Me)"	YouTube	
Rob Thomas	United States	2020	"I Wanna Dance with Somebody (Who Loves Me)"	YouTube	
Robin Thicke	United States	2012	"Exhale (Shoop Shoop)"	Single	
Ron Isley	United States	1998	"Exhale (Shoop Shoop)"	Live performance	
Ryan Adams	United States	2024	"I Wanna Dance with Somebody (Who Loves Me)"	Album	
Sam Smith	United Kingdom	2014	"How Will I Know"	Album	
Sam Smith	United Kingdom	2019	"My Love Is Your Love"	Album	
Scott Matthew	Australia	2013	"I Wanna Dance with Somebody (Who Loves Me)"	Album	
Scouting for Girls	United Kingdom	2021	"I Wanna Dance with Somebody (Who Loves Me)"	Music video	
Selah	United States	2011	"I Look to You"	Album	
Shannon Magrane	United States	2012	"I Have Nothing"	Live performance	
Sheryn Regis	Philippines	2005	"Try It on My Own"	Album	
Sheryn Regis	Philippines	2008	"Where Do Broken Hearts Go"	Album	
Skatune Network	United States	2022	"I Wanna Dance with Somebody (Who Loves Me)"	Music video	
Sleep Token	United Kingdom	2020	"I Wanna Dance with Somebody (Who Loves Me)"	Album	
Smokie Norful	United States	2006	"Run to You"	Album	
Sonika Vaid	United States	2016	"I Have Nothing"	Live performance	
Sons of Serendip	United States	2015	"How Will I Know"	Album	
Stephanie Mills	United States	1983	"Eternal Love"	Album	
Stephanie Styles	United States	2020	"I Wanna Dance with Somebody (Who Loves Me)"	Television show	
Sub-Radio	United States	2023	"I Wanna Dance with Somebody (Who Loves Me)" (aka "I Don't Wanna Dance with Nobody")	Music video	
SunMin	South Korea	2008	"I Have Nothing"	Album	
Tawiah	United Kingdom	2014	"I Wanna Dance with Somebody (Who Loves Me)"	YouTube	
Teodora Sava	Romania	2013	"One Moment in Time"	Live performance	
Terry Ellis	United States	1998	"How Will I Know"	Live performance	
Tessanne Chin	United States	2013	"I Have Nothing"	Live performance	
The Chipettes	United States	1988	"I Wanna Dance with Somebody (Who Loves Me)"	Album	
The Hindley Street Country Club	Australia	2023	"You Give Good Love"	Music video	
The Hindley Street Country Club	Australia	2025	"I Have Nothing"	Music video	
The Hyannis Sound	United States	2011	"I Wanna Dance with Somebody (Who Loves Me)"	Album	
The Hyannis Sound	United States	2019	"How Will I Know"	Album	
The Hyannis Sound	United States	2019	"I Have Nothing"	Album	
The Lemonheads	United States	1996	"How Will I Know"	Album	
The Puppini Sisters	United Kingdom	2020	"I Wanna Dance with Somebody (Who Loves Me)"	Album	
The Shadows	United Kingdom	1989	"I Wanna Dance with Somebody (Who Loves Me)"	Album	
The Shadows	United Kingdom	1989	"One Moment in Time"	Album	
The Whispers	United States	1997	"Exhale (Shoop Shoop)"	Album	
These Kids Wear Crowns	Canada	2011	"I Wanna Dance with Somebody (Who Loves Me)"	Album	
Tom Speight	United Kingdom	2018	"I Wanna Dance with Somebody (Who Loves Me)"	Single	
Tootsie Guevara; Garth Garcia	Philippines	2024	"I Wanna Dance with Somebody (Who Loves Me)"	Single	
Tori Kelly	United States	2024	"I Have Nothing"	Live performance	
Trenyce	United States	2003	"I Have Nothing"	Live performance	
Trisha Yearwood	United States	2016	"My Love Is Your Love"	Soundtrack	
Ty Herndon	United States	2018	"I Wanna Dance with Somebody (Who Loves Me)"	Music video	
Tyler Ward	United States	2018	"I Wanna Dance with Somebody (Who Loves Me)"	Music video	
Vanessa-Mae	Singapore	1991	"One Moment in Time"	Album	
Vitamin String Quartet	United States	2013	"When You Believe"	Album	
Von Smith	United States	2017	"I Have Nothing"	Music video	
Vonzell Solomon	United States	2005	"I Have Nothing"	Live performance	
Wayne Wonder	Jamaica	1993	"Where Do Broken Hearts Go"	Single	
Will Young	United Kingdom	2022	"How Will I Know"	Album	
Wynonna Judd	United States	1998	"You Were Loved"	Soundtrack	
Yasmin	United Kingdom	2013	"Thinking About You"	Single	
Young Divas	Australia	2007	"I Wanna Dance with Somebody (Who Loves Me)"	Album	

== See also ==
- Whitney Houston singles discography
- List of songs recorded by Whitney Houston
