= Below the salt (disambiguation) =

Below the salt is a Medieval British idiom meaning vulgar.

Below the salt may also refer to:

- Below the Salt (Haley Blais album)
- Below the Salt (Steeleye Span album)
- "Below the Salt", a song by Unwound from Leaves Turn Inside You
- Below the Salt, a novel by Thomas B. Costain
- Below the Salt, a short story collection by Elizabeth Robins under the pseudonym C. E. Raimond
- Below the Salt, a novel by Virna Sheard
- Below the Salt, a novel by Emma Caroline Wood
- Below the Salt (installation), an installation art work by Catherine Bertola

== See also ==
- Above the salt (disambiguation)
