= Sambuy Castle =

Castle in Piedmont, Italy

- Castello di Sambuy
- San Mauro Torinese, Piedmont, Italy
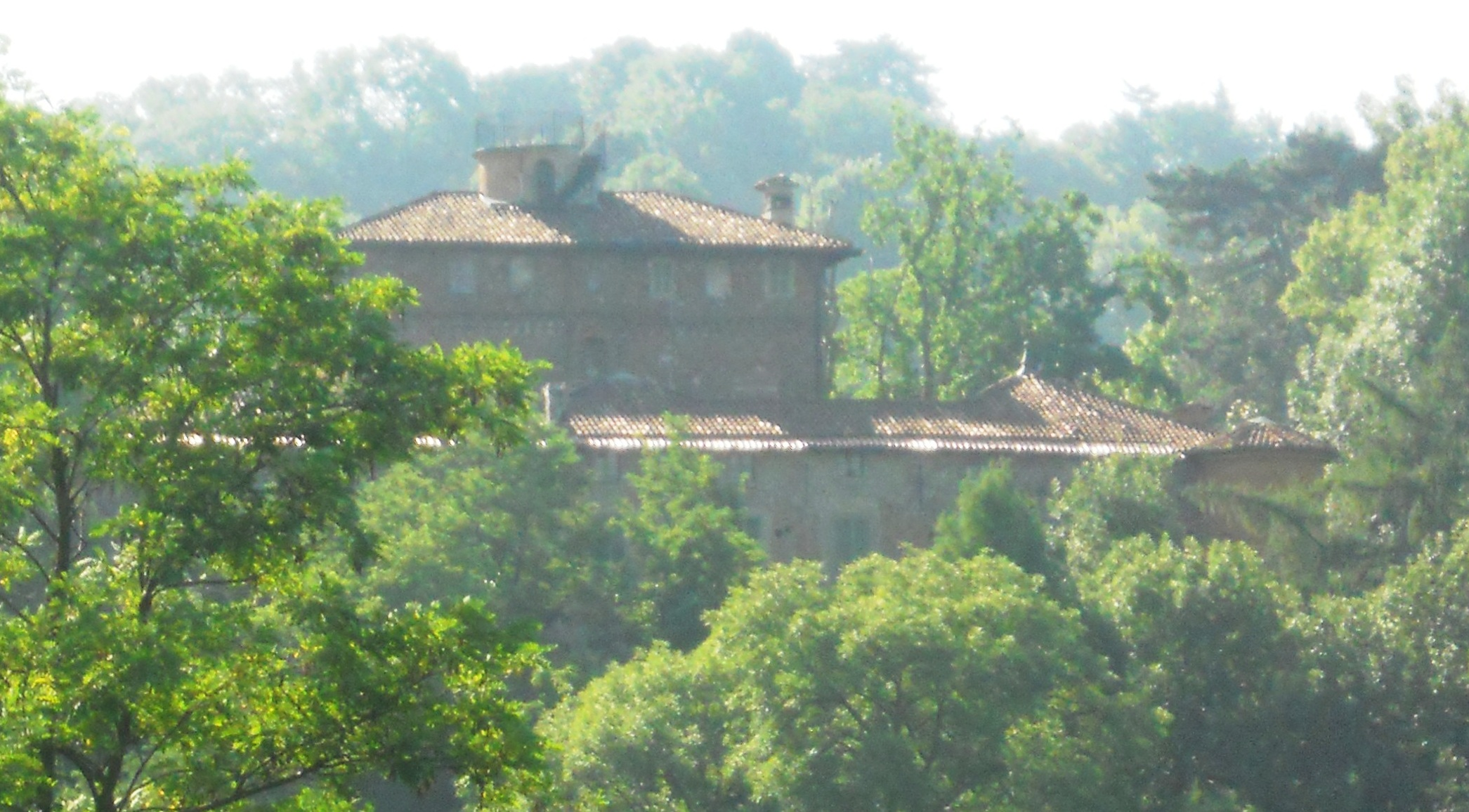
- Sambuy Castle in 2015

Site information
- Type: Castle

Location
- Coordinates: 45°6′58.89″N 7°46′48.25″E

Sambuy Castle (Italian: Castello di Sambuy) is a castle located in San Mauro Torinese, Piedmont, Italy.

== History ==
Sambuy Castle is located at the lowland end of a long ridge that in the Middle Ages marked the border between the possessions of the House of Savoy, to the north, and the Marquisate of Monferrat, to the south. Political and military reasons led to the construction of a castle in this strategic location as early as 1300, making it one of the most prominent outposts towards the Po Plain and the Canavese region.

Initially controlled by Pulcherada Abbey, it was granted to the noble Nicolino da Rivalta before being sold to the Princes of Acaja. It was later reclaimed by the Marquises of Monferrat, who enfeoffed it to the noble Paolo di Castiglione. The Acaja, unwilling to accept its loss, engaged in further conflicts until it passed to Boniforte Provana di Leynì. Due to financial difficulties, he eventually sold it to Benvenuto Balbo Bertone of Chieri on October 4, 1430.

In 1772, Charles Emmanuel III, King of Sardinia, elevated the lordship of Sambuy to a county. From that moment on, the members of the Balbi Bertone family, who still continued to own the estate, assumed the title of Counts of Sambuy.

In the 19th century, Ernesto Balbo Bertone of Sambuy, who also served as mayor of Turin, commissioned the creation of a large oval Italian-style garden in front of the castle, designed by Curtino, a Savoyard draftsman. On its northern side, an elegant Neo-Gothic orangery, attributed to Pelagio Pelagi, was also built.
