= San Mauro Torinese =

San Mauro Torinese San Mò
- Comune
- Comune di San Mauro Torinese
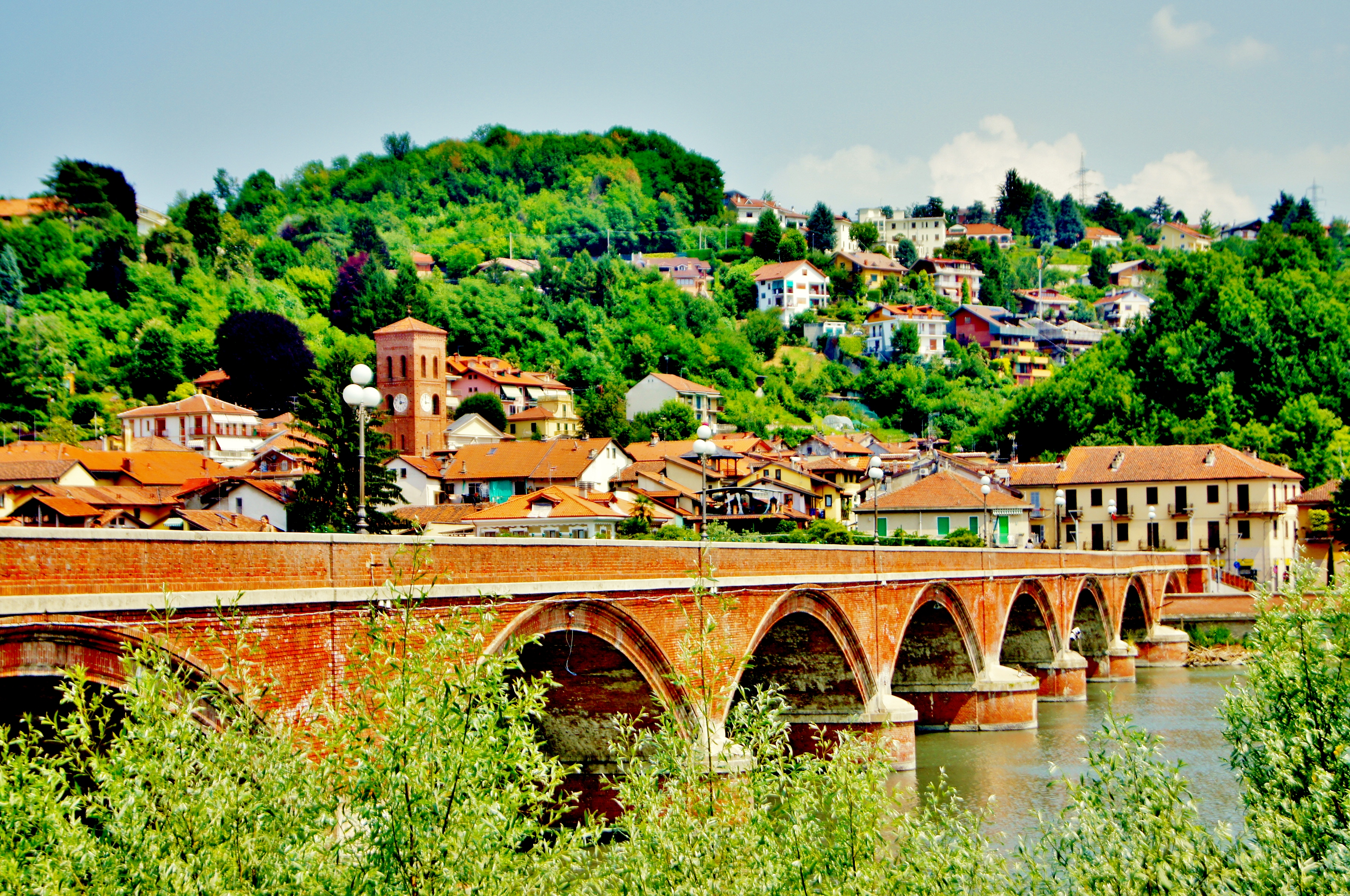

- Coat of arms

- Location within Italy Location within Piedmont
- Coordinates: 45°06′N 07°46′E
- Country: Italy
- Region: Piedmont
- Metropolitan city: Turin
- Frazioni: Oltre Po, Cascina del Mulino, Pescarito, Pescatori, Sambuy, Sant'Anna

Government
  - Mayor: Giulia Guazzora (centre-right)

Area
  - Total: 12.55 km^{2} (4.85 sq mi)
- Elevation: 211 m (692 ft)

Population (2026)
  - Total: 18,267
  - Density: 1,456/km^{2} (3,770/sq mi)
- Demonym: Sanmauresi
- Time zone: UTC+1 (CET)
  - Summer (DST): UTC+2 (CEST)
- Postal code: 10099
- Dialing code: 011
- ISTAT code: 001249
- Patron saint: St. Peter
- Saint day: April 7
- Website: Official website

San Mauro Torinese (Piedmontese: San Mò) is a town and comune (municipality) in the Metropolitan City of Turin in the region of Piedmont in Italy. It has 18,267 inhabitants.

San Mauro Torinese borders the municipalities of Settimo Torinese, Castiglione Torinese, Turin, and Baldissero Torinese.

== History ==
The first written record of Pulchra Rada (the ancient name for San Mauro, which in Latin means "beautiful beach and/or port" - on the Po river) dates from 4 May 991. On that day Anselmo (at the time the ruler of Montferrat) gave the order to rebuild a Benedictine monastery, erected originally above a pre-existing ancient Roman settlement, that had been destroyed by a Saracen invasion.

The abbey became especially prosperous in the 12th century, after which it started to decline due to the continuous strife between the bordering Marquisate of Montferrat and Duchy of Savoy. In 1474 it was therefore suppressed and turned into in commendam. The way was owned by the Benedictinese until 1603 when it was transferred to secular clergy. The convent was suppressed again by Pope Pius VI in 1803.

Bridge Victor Emmanuel III, connecting San Mauro to Bertolla, locally known as ponte vecchio (old bridge), was inaugurated on 8 September 1912.

== Demographics ==
As of 2026, the population is 18,267, of which 48.3% are male, and 51.7% are female. Minors make up 13.5% of the population, and seniors make up 29.4%.

Historical population

Year	Pop.	±%
1861	2,033	—
1871	2,327	+14.5%
1881	2,480	+6.6%
1901	2,999	+20.9%
1911	3,577	+19.3%
1921	3,476	−2.8%
1931	4,357	+25.3%
1936	4,437	+1.8%

Year	Pop.	±%
1951	5,282	+19.0%
1961	8,521	+61.3%
1971	12,667	+48.7%
1981	14,655	+15.7%
1991	16,746	+14.3%
2001	17,817	+6.4%
2011	18,925	+6.2%
2021	18,635	−1.5%

Source: ISTAT

=== Immigration ===
As of 2025, of the known countries of birth of 18,252 residents, the most numerous are: Italy (17,105 – 93.7%), Romania (335 – 1.8%).

== Main sights ==
- Pulcherada Abbey
- Parish church of Santa Maria
- Sambuy Castle
- Natural Park of Superga Hill

== Twin towns and sister cities ==
- Mirande, France
- L'Eliana, Spain
