= Margherita Rinaldi =

Italian opera singer (1935–2023)

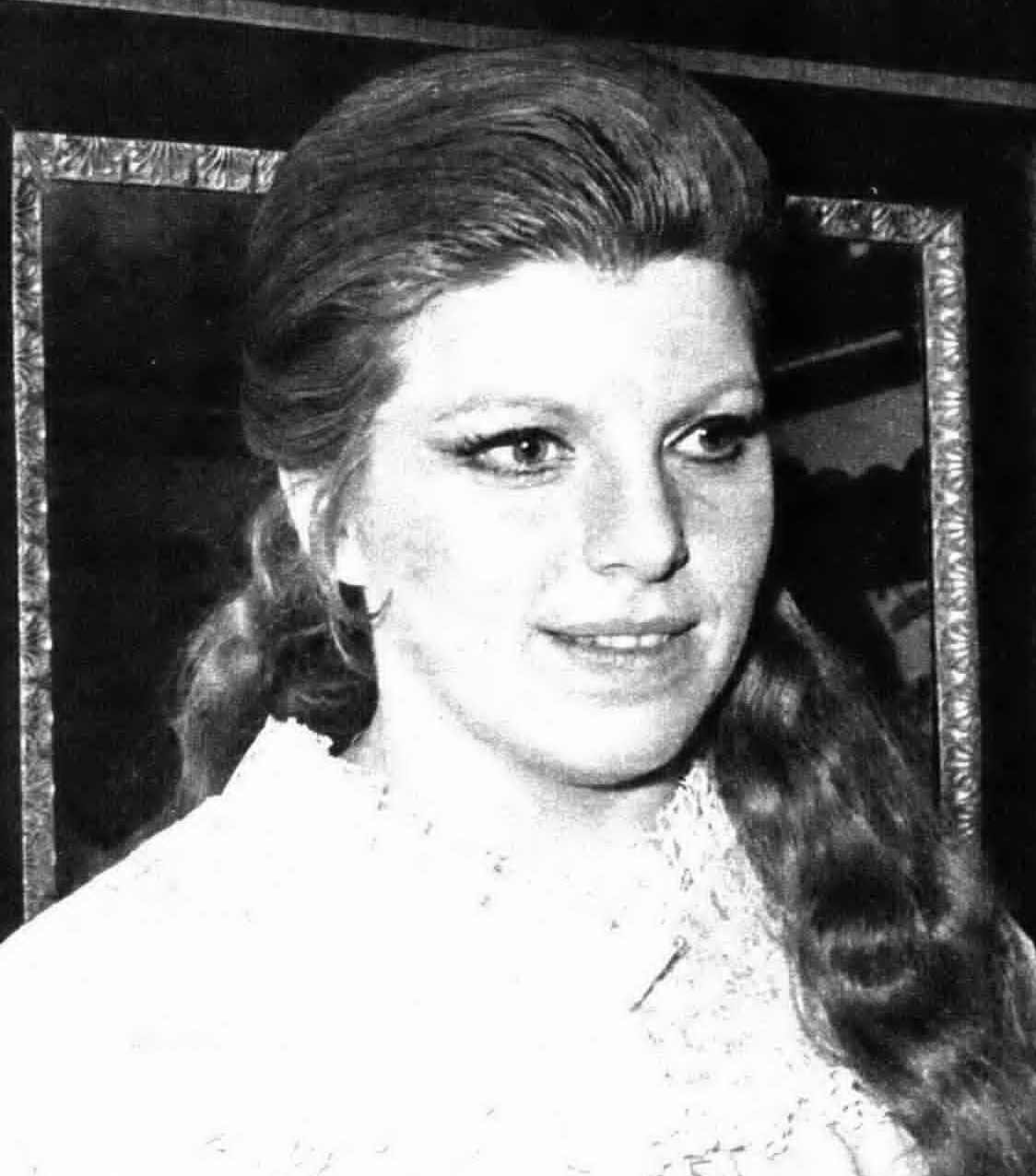
- Rinaldi in Radiocorriere magazine, 1971
- Born: 12 January 1935; Turin, Italy
- Died: 7 September 2023 (aged 88); Florence, Italy
- Occupation: Lyric soprano
- Organizations: La Scala

Margherita Rinaldi (12 January 1935 – 7 September 2023) was an Italian lyric soprano, primarily active in the 1960s and 1970s, after she made her debut as Donizetti's Lucia di Lammermoor in 1958, prompting her career at La Scala in Milan. She also appeared internationally, performing a wide repertoire including, besides Italian belcanto roles, Baroque and French opera. She recorded the roles of Gilda in Verdi's Rigoletto and Ilia in Mozart's Idomeneo. From 1981, she worked as a voice teacher.

== Life and career ==
Margherita Rinaldi was born in Turin on 12 January 1935, and completed her music studies in Rovigo. She won the Belli voice competition of the Teatro Lirico Sperimentale in Spoleto, appearing there in 1958 in the title role of Donizetti's Lucia di Lammermoor. The success prompted her debut at La Scala in Milan the following year as Sinaide in Rossini's Mosè in Egitto. She first performed at the Arena di Verona in 1962, as Oscar in Verdi's Un ballo in maschera, alongside Leyla Gencer, Carlo Bergonzi, and conducted by Gianandrea Gavazzeni. She performed at the Teatro Filarmonico of Verona as Amelia in Verdi's Simon Boccanegra in 1979, alongside Renato Bruson in the title role, directed by Filippo Crivelli and conducted by Roberto Abbado.

Rinaldi appeared at La Scala as Gilda in Verdi's Rigoletto, Nannetta in Falstaff, in 1966 as Giulietta in Bellini's I Capuleti e i Montecchi, alongside Giacomo Aragall and Luciano Pavarotti, when Claudio Abbado conducted a new critical edition, and as Linda in a revival of Linda di Chamounix in 1972, alongside Alfredo Kraus. She sang at most of the major opera houses in Italy, in roles such as Amina in Bellini's La sonnambula, Donizetti's Adina in L'elisir d'amore and Norina in Don Pasquale, and Verdi's Gilda. She also excelled in operas by Mozart and by Cimarosa.

She sang a wide variety of roles for RAI between 1963 and 1975, such as Bertha in Meyerbeer's Le Prophète, Handel's Cleopatra in Giulio Cesare and Ginevra in Ariodante, and Noraime in Cherubini's Les Abencérages. She recorded Verdi's La traviata with Pavarotti in Dublin in 1964.

In 1977 she had a triumph singing Amenaide in Rossini's Tancredi alongside Marilyn Horne at Teatro dell'Opera di Roma. Reviewers noted then the limpid quality and agility of her voice, and her stylistic security. Angelo Sguerzi wrote for Stirpi canore about her "homogeneity of timbre, equality of registers, smooth and clear extension up to E-flat on the top, gentle, demure phrasing, without melodramaticism of dubious taste".

In 1978, Rinaldi appeared as Adalgisa in a production of Bellini's Norma at the Teatro Comunale in Florence. Conducted by Riccardo Muti and starring Renata Scotto in the title role, she performed the role in the original soprano register.

=== International career ===
Rinaldi enjoyed a successful international career, making her American debut at the Dallas Opera as Gilda in 1966. Her debut at the San Francisco Opera was as Lucia in 1968. She also sang at the Lyric Opera of Chicago. Rinaldi performed at the Glyndebourne, Wexford and Bregenz festivals. In Bregenz, she appeared in 1967 as Carolina in Cimarosa's Il matrimonio segreto directed by Crivelli, with the Vienna Symphony conducted by Vittorio Gui. She appeared as Ines in Meyerbeer's L'Africaine at the Royal Opera House in London, alongside Plácido Domingo and Grace Bumbry.

=== Opera recordings ===
Rinaldi made only three commercial opera recordings, as Gilda in Rigoletto opposite Rolando Panerai and Franco Bonisolli, which was also the soundtrack of a German television production, as Lucilla in Rossini’s La Scala Di Seta, and as Ilia in Mozart's Idomeneo with Sir Colin Davis conducting. Luckily, unofficial "pirate" recordings have preserved several of her live performances: the Spoleto Lucia di Lammermoor, the Scala I Capuleti e i Montecchi and Linda di Chamounix, the RAI Le Prophète, a 1967 Rigoletto from Turin, and the 1978 Norma from Florence.

=== Concert ===
Rinaldi was an excellent performer of sacred music; she often sang with the RAI National Symphony Orchestra. She performed the part of Maria Maddalena in Lorenzo Perosi's oratorio La Resurrezione di Cristo in 1969, and was the soprano soloist in both Handel's Messiah in 1970, conducted by Bertola, and in Beethoven's Ninth Symphony in 1981. She performed at La Scala in Rossini's Petite messe solennelle, and for RAI TV in Mozart's Vesperae solennes de confessore. She recorded Carissimi's Dives malus with Angelo Ephrikian and took part in the first recording of Rossini's Messa di Gloria in 1974. She recorded two Bach cantatas, Jauchzet Gott in allen Landen, BWV 51, and Mein Herze schwimmt im Blut, BWV 199, with Antonio Janigro and the Angelicum Orchestra of Milan for Ricordi.

=== Later life ===
Rinaldi retired from the stage in 1981. She lived outside Florence, where she privately coached young singers.

Rinaldi died in Impruneta on 7 September 2023, at age 88.
