= Kirouac =

Kirouac is a toponymic surname, and may refer to:

Kirouac is a corruption of Kerouac that come from a lieu-dit found in Brittany like in Rosporden as Kerouac and in Lanmeur as Kervoac. It derives from the Breton ker which means village or area and gwak which means soft, ultimately meaning wet soil hamlet. It could also come from a corruption of kergoat. It is also found spelled as Kiroack, Kirouack, Kyrouac, Kéroac, Kérouac, Kerouac, Kervoac, Kerouack or Karouac. It is a common surname in Quebec.

- Marie-Victorin Kirouac, Canadian member of Brothers of the Christian Schools and a noted botanist
- Jean Louis Kirouac a.k.a. Jack Kerouac, American novelist and poet
- Matt Kirouac, American travel writer and author
- Anne Renée a.k.a. Manon Kirouac - Québécois singer

== Bibliography ==
- Dictionnaire étymologique des noms de famille et prénoms de France (Albert Dauzat, Larousse Sélection, Librairie Larousse, 1969)
