= Bertola =

Bertola is a surname. Notable people with the surname include:

- Adrianna Bertola (born 1999), English actress and singer
- Catherine Bertola (born 1976), British artist
- Ignazio Bertola, Italian military architect
- Jean Bertola (1922–1989), French musician
- Mariana Bertola (1865–1955), American educator, physician and reformer

== See also ==
- 46392 Bertola, a main-belt asteroid
