= Afro Blue (disambiguation) =

Afro Blue is a composition by Mongo Santamaría.

Afro Blue may also refer to:

- Afro Blue (Dee Dee Bridgewater album)
- Afro Blue (Harold Mabern album)
- Afro Blue (McCoy Tyner album)
- Afro Blue (choir), a Howard University jazz ensemble
