= Daniele =

Daniele is an Italian male given name, the cognate of the English name Daniel. Danièle is also a French female given name, an alternative spelling of Danielle.

== Men ==
- Daniele Amfitheatrof (1901—1982), Russian-Italian composer and conductor
- Daniele Barbaro (1514–1570), Italian cleric and diplomat
- Daniele Bracciali (born 1978), Italian tennis player
- Daniele Callegarin (born 1982), Italian former cyclist
- Daniele Colli (born 1982), Italian road racing cyclist
- Daniele De Rossi (born 1983), Italian footballer
- Daniele Giorgini (born 1984), Italian tennis player
- Daniele Greco (born 1989), Italian triple jumper
- Daniele Greco (footballer) (born 1988), Italian footballer
- Daniele Luchetti (born 1960), Italian film director, screenwriter and actor
- Daniele Manin (1804–1857), Italian patriot and politician
- Daniele Martinelli (born 1982), Italian footballer
- Daniele Monticelli (born 1970), Italian semiotician, translation scholar and translator
- Daniele Pitani (1922–1992), stage name Daniele Vargas, Italian film actor
- Daniele Russo (born 1985), Swiss footballer
- Daniele Silvestri (born 1968), Italian singer and songwriter
- Daniele Sommariva (born 1997), Italian footballer
- Daniele da Volterra (c. 1509–1566), Italian painter and sculptor

== Women ==
- Danièle Djamila Amrane-Minne (1939–2017), convicted of assisting the FLN during the Algerian War, later professor of history and feminist studies
- Danièle Ciarlet (born 1943), birth name of Zouzou (model), French model, actress and singer
- Danièle Debernard (born 1954), French former alpine skier
- Danièle Delorme (1927–2015), stage name of French actress and film producer Gabrielle Danièle Marguerite Andrée Girard
- Danièle Dorice (1935–2018), Canadian singer and teacher
- Danièle Guinot, French biologist
- Danièle Hervieu-Léger (born 1947), French sociologist
- Danièle Heymann (1933-2019), French journalist and film critic
- Danièle Hoffman-Rispal (1951–2020), French politician
- Danièle Huillet (1936–2006), French filmmaker
- Danièle Kaber (born 1960), retired long-distance runner from Luxembourg
- Danièle Kergoat (born 1942), French academic and feminist sociologist
- Danièle Lebrun (born 1937), French actress
- Danièle Nouy (born 1950), chair of the supervisory board at the European Central Bank
- Danièle Nyst (1942–1998), Belgian video artist
- Danièle Parola (1905–1998), French film actress
- Danièle Sallenave (born 1940), French novelist and journalist
- Danièle Sauvageau (born 1962), Canadian ice hockey executive and former head coach of the Canadian women's team
- Danièle Thompson (born 1942), film director and screenwriter from Monaco
- Danièle Watts, American actress

== See also ==
- List of people named Daniel
