= Posthuma (surname) =

Posthuma is a Dutch surname that may refer to:

- Carst Posthuma (1868–1939), Dutch cricket player
- Danielle Posthuma (born 1972), Dutch neuroscientist
- Douwe Bob Posthuma (born 1992), Dutch singer-songwriter, known simply as Douwe Bob
- Folkert Posthuma (1874–1943), Dutch politician
- Jan Posthuma (born 1963), Dutch volleyball player
- Joost Posthuma (born 1981), Dutch road bicycle racer
