= Castiglione Torinese =

- Comune
- Comune di Castiglione Torinese
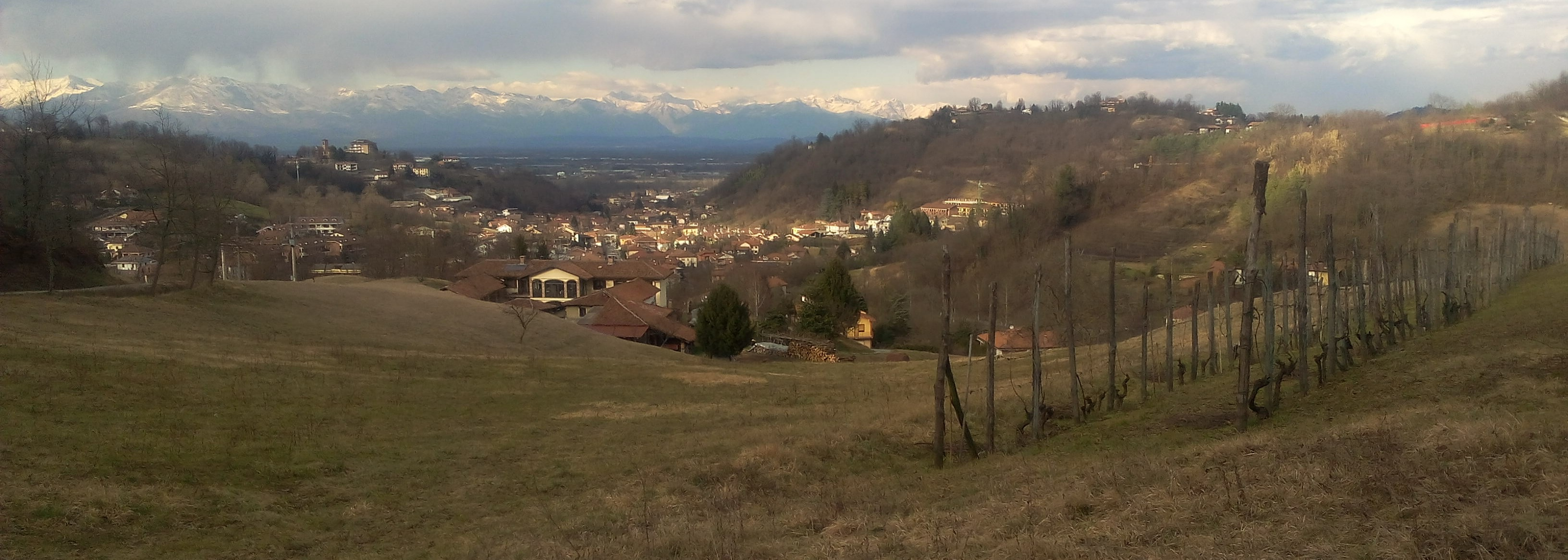

- Coat of arms

- Location within Italy Location within Piedmont
- Coordinates: 45°7′N 7°49′E
- Country: Italy
- Region: Piedmont
- Metropolitan city: Turin (TO)
- Frazioni: Cordova, San Martino, Rivodora

Government
  - Mayor: Loris Giovanni Lovera

Area
  - Total: 14.13 km^{2} (5.46 sq mi)
- Elevation: 216 m (709 ft)

Population (30 November 2017)
  - Total: 6,481
  - Density: 458.7/km^{2} (1,188/sq mi)
- Demonym: Castiglionese(i)
- Time zone: UTC+1 (CET)
  - Summer (DST): UTC+2 (CEST)
- Postal code: 10090
- Dialing code: 011
- Website: Official website

Castiglione Torinese is a comune (municipality) in the Metropolitan City of Turin in the Italian region Piedmont, about 11 kilometres (7 mi) northeast of Turin.

Castiglione Torinese borders the following municipalities: Settimo Torinese, Gassino Torinese, San Mauro Torinese, Baldissero Torinese, and Pavarolo.
