= Pavarolo =

- Comune
- Comune di Pavarolo
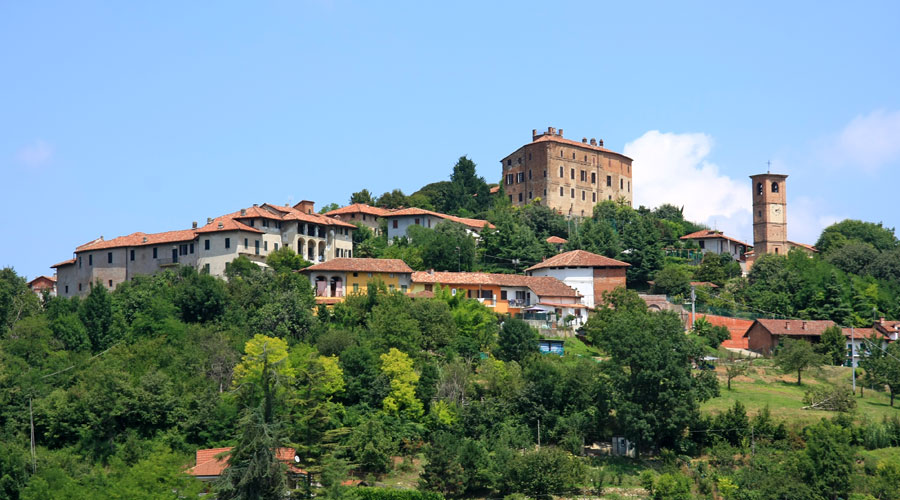

- Location within Italy Location within Piedmont
- Coordinates: 45°4′N 7°50′E
- Country: Italy
- Region: Piedmont
- Metropolitan city: Turin (TO)

Government
  - Mayor: Laura Martini

Area
  - Total: 4.4 km^{2} (1.7 sq mi)
- Elevation: 363 m (1,191 ft)

Population (31 December 2010)
  - Total: 1,107
  - Density: 250/km^{2} (650/sq mi)
- Demonym: Pavarolesi
- Time zone: UTC+1 (CET)
  - Summer (DST): UTC+2 (CEST)
- Postal code: 10020
- Dialing code: 011
- Website: Official website

Pavarolo is a comune (municipality) in the Metropolitan City of Turin in the Italian region Piedmont, located about 10 kilometres (6 mi) east of Turin. Pavarolo borders the following municipalities: Gassino Torinese, Castiglione Torinese, Baldissero Torinese, Montaldo Torinese, and Chieri.

== Twin towns and sister cities ==
Pavarolo is twinned with:

- Le Cheylas, France, since 1995
