= Above the salt (disambiguation) =

Above the salt is a Medieval British idiom meaning of high standing or honor.

Above the salt may also refer to:

- Above the Salt, a novel by Katherine Vaz
- "Above the Salt", a single by Vérité

== See also ==
- Below the salt (disambiguation)
