= Daniel (given name) =

Name list and personal name

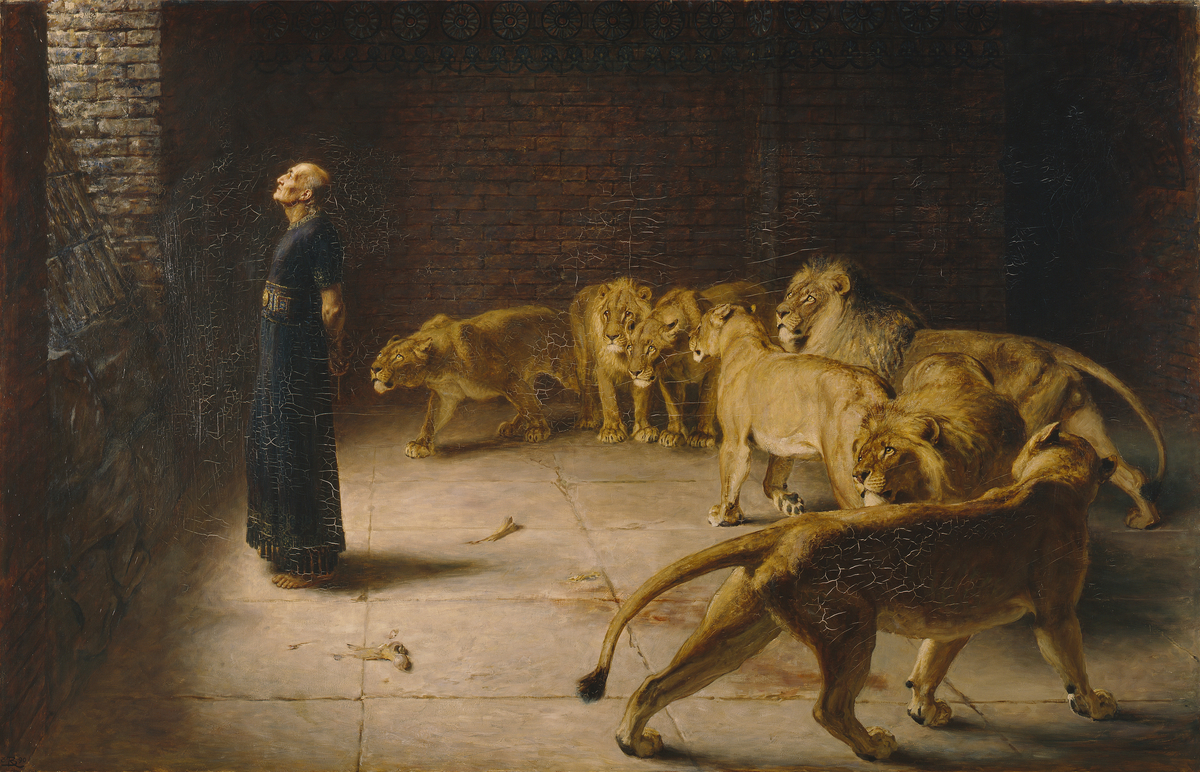
- 1892 British color print of Daniel in the lions' den
- Pronunciation: Czech: [ˈdanɪjɛl] Dutch: [ˈdaːnijɛl] French: [danjɛl] German: [ˈdaːni̯eːl, -ni̯ɛl] Polish: [ˈdaɲɛl] Serbo-Croatian: [dǎniel] Spanish: [daˈnjel]
- Gender: Masculine
- Name day: July 21

Origin
- Origin: Hebrew
- Meaning: God is my judge

Other names
- Related names: Dan, Danielle (English); דָּנִיֵּאל (Daniyyel / Dāniyyêl) (Hebrew); ዳንኤል (Danyel / Daniyal / Dani) (Ge'ez); Danyel, Danyal (Turkish); دانيال (Danyal / Danial / Danyal) (Urdu); ܕܢܝܐܝܠ (Dānīʾêl) (Syriac); Daniele (Italian); Daniël, Daniel, Daan, Dana (Dutch); Данаил (Danail) (Bulgarian); დანიელი (Danieli) (Georgian); Δανιήλ (Daniil) (Greek); Dániel (Hungarian); Даниел (Daniel) (Bulgarian / Macedonian); Даниил (Daniil) (Russian); Данила (Danila) (Russian); Данил (Danil) (Russian); Даниель (Daniel) (Kazakh); Даниал (Danial) (Kazakh); Данијел (Danijel) / Danijel (Serbian / Slovene, Croatian); Danilo / Данило (Danylo) (Brazilian Portuguese, Italian, Slovene, Croatian / Serbian, Ukrainian); Dănuț (Romanian); Tanel (Estonian); Taneli (Finnish); Դանիէլ (Taniēl) (Armenian); دانيال (Danyal/ Daniel) (Kurdish); دانيال (Dâniyal / Danial) (Persian); دانيال (Daniel) (Arabic); Deiniol (Welsh); Daniel (Breton); Danel (Basque); Daniel, Daniyal (Indonesian); Đanien (Vietnamese); Daniel (Irish); ダニエル (Danieru) (Japanese); 다니엘 (Daniel) (Korean); (Source:)

Daniel (Hebrew: דָּנִיֵּאל) is a masculine given name and a surname of Hebrew origin. It means "God is my judge" and derives from two early biblical figures, primary among them Daniel from the Book of Daniel. It is a common given name for males and also used as a surname, and is the basis for various derived given names and surnames.

== Background ==
The name evolved into over 100 different spellings in countries around the world. The name "Daniil" (Даниил) is common in Russia. In Kazakh the names Daniel (Даниель) and Danial (Даниал) are commonly used. Feminine versions (Danielle, Danièle, Daniela, Daniella) are prevalent as well. It has been particularly well-used in Ireland. The Dutch names "Daan" and "Daniël" are also variations of Daniel. A related surname, Daniels, developed as a patronymic. Other surnames derived from "Daniel" include McDaniel and Danielson.

== Popularity ==
In the United States, the U.S. Social Security Administration reports that Daniel has peaked as the fifth most popular name for newborns in 1985, 1990, 2007, and 2008. The U.S. Census Bureau reported that in the 2000 census, "Daniels" was the 182nd most common surname in the U.S., while "McDaniel" was ranked at 323, and "Daniel" (without a final "s") was ranked at 380. In 2016, Top 100 Baby Names in Canada ranked it at number 27. In 2022, it was the 31st most popular name given to boys in Canada.

== People named Daniel ==
- List of people with given name Daniel
- List of people with surname Daniel

== See also ==
- Danel
