= Danièle Heymann =

French film critic and journalist (1933–2019)

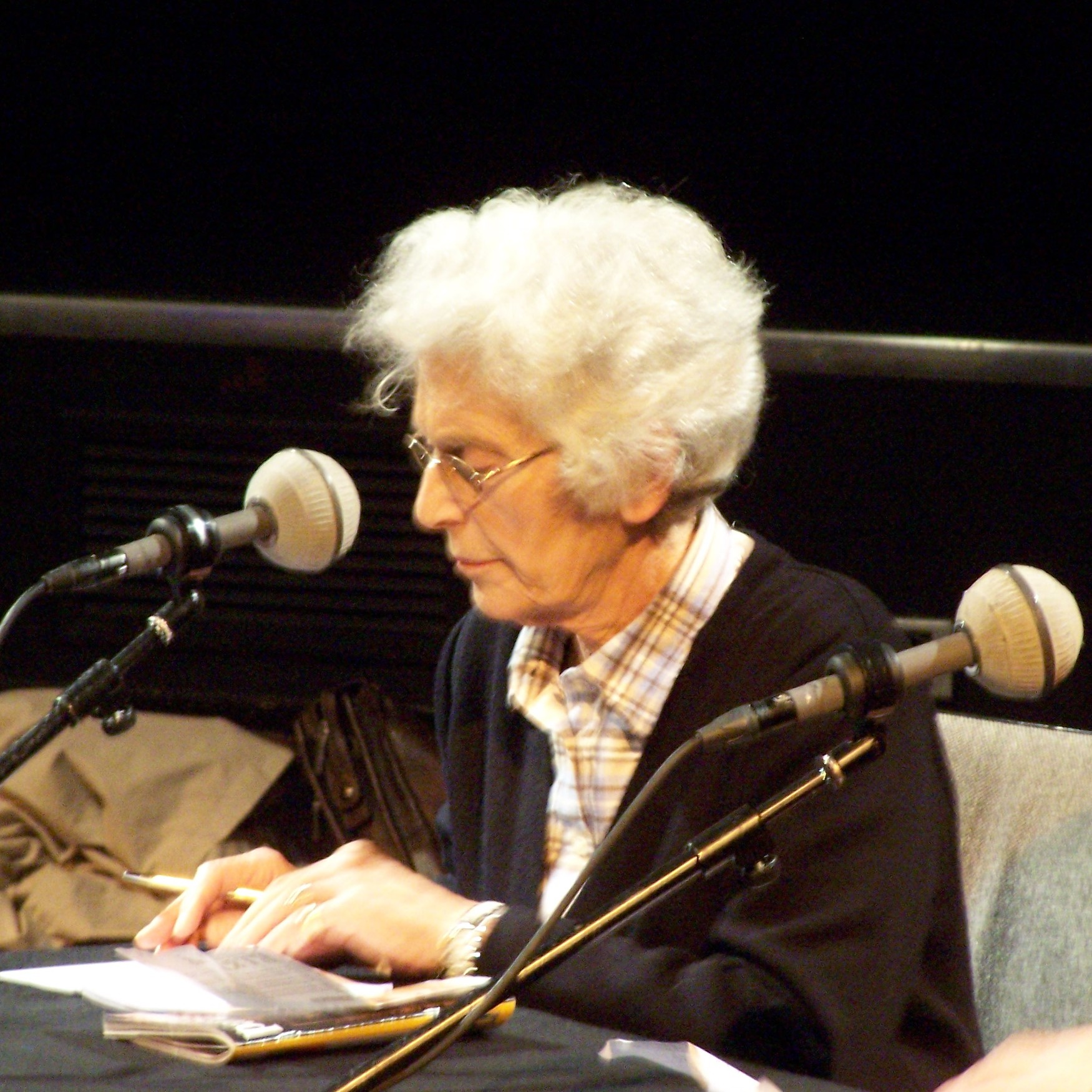
Danièle Heymann, 2012

Danièle Heymann (16 May 1933 – 25 July 2019) was a French journalist and film critic. She was the former head of the Culture Department at Le Monde, a film critic for Marianne and L'Express, and was a participant in the show Le Masque et la Plume on France Inter. She was a recipient of the Chevalier of the Légion d'honneur and Officer of the National Order of Merit.

== Biography ==
Danièle Heymann was born in Paris on 16 May 1933. She was the daughter of filmmaker Claude Heymann, and was the second wife of singer Jean Bertola. Her first salaried job was at the Cinémathèque Française. After starting at France-Soir, she was quickly dismissed because of a very negative review of a film with Roger Pierre and Jean-Marc Thibault. She was a cinema critic at L'Express and Marianne, and head of the Culture Department at Le Monde. From 1989 to 2019, she served as a cinema columnist on the radio show Le Masque et la Plume. She was a member of the jury of the Cannes Film Festival in 1987. From 1977 to 2006 she directed L'Année du cinéma, which she wrote alone or with Pierre Murat or Alain Lacombe.

Heymann was a friend of Michèle Morgan and Françoise Arnoul during her youth. She died on 25 July 2019.

== Awards and honors ==
- 1993, Chevalier of the Légion d'honneur
- 2019, Officer of the National Order of Merit
- 2014, prix Bernard Chardère remis from Institut Lumière
