= Bertolla =

Bertolla is an Italian surname. Notable people with the surname include:

- Cesare Bertolla (1845 - 1920), Italian painter
- Costantino Bertolla (born 1963), former Italian male mountain runner

== See also ==
- Bertolli
- Bertola
