= Baldissero Torinese =

- Comune
- Comune di Baldissero Torinese

- Coat of arms

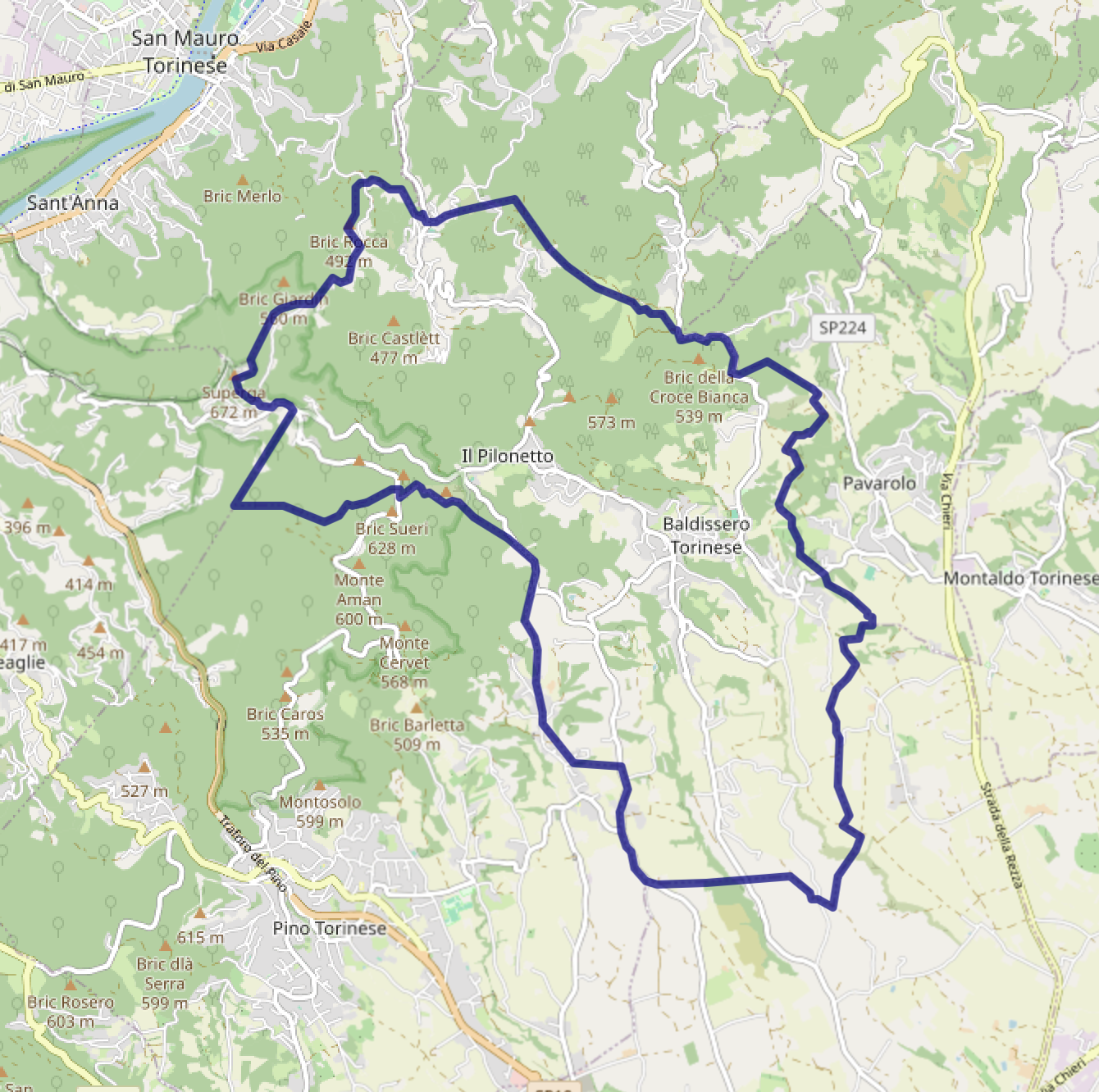
- OSM map of Baldissero Torinese.

- Location within Italy Location within Piedmont
- Coordinates: 45°4′N 7°49′E
- Country: Italy
- Region: Piedmont
- Metropolitan city: Turin
- Frazioni: Rivodora

Government
  - Mayor: Piero Cordero

Area
  - Total: 15.41 km^{2} (5.95 sq mi)
- Elevation: 421 m (1,381 ft)

Population (2026)
  - Total: 3,692
  - Density: 239.6/km^{2} (620.5/sq mi)
- Demonym: Baldisserese(i)
- Time zone: UTC+1 (CET)
  - Summer (DST): UTC+2 (CEST)
- Postal code: 10020
- Dialing code: 011
- Website: Official website

Baldissero Torinese is a town and comune (municipality) in the Metropolitan City of Turin in the region of Piedmont in Italy, located about 9 kilometres (6 mi) east of Turin. It has 3,692 inhabitants.

Baldissero Torinese borders the municipalities of Castiglione Torinese, Torino, San Mauro Torinese, Pavarolo, Pino Torinese, and Chieri.

== Demographics ==
As of 2026, the population is 3,692, of which 48.8% are male, and 51.2% are female. Minors make up 14.1% of the population, and seniors make up 27.9%.

Historical population

Year	Pop.	±%
1861	1,807	—
1871	1,953	+8.1%
1881	1,946	−0.4%
1901	1,970	+1.2%
1911	1,761	−10.6%
1921	1,617	−8.2%
1931	1,552	−4.0%
1936	1,500	−3.4%

Year	Pop.	±%
1951	1,431	−4.6%
1961	1,269	−11.3%
1971	1,396	+10.0%
1981	2,349	+68.3%
1991	2,876	+22.4%
2001	3,244	+12.8%
2011	3,783	+16.6%
2021	3,755	−0.7%

Source: ISTAT

=== Immigration ===
As of 2025, of the known countries of birth of 3,692 residents, the most numerous are: Italy (3,450 – 93.4%), Romania (69 – 1.9%), France (30 – 0.8%).

== Twin towns and sister cities ==
- Grude, Bosnia and Herzegovina
