= Kergoat (surname) =

Kergoat is a toponymic surname, and may refer to:

Kergoat derives from the Breton ker which means village or area and koad which means woods.

- Lukian Kergoat - Breton linguist and writer
- Jacques Kergoat - French sociologist, historian and political far-left activist
- Danièle Kergoat - French academic and sociologist
- Georges Quilliou a.k.a. Channig Kergoat - Breton humorist
- Yannick Kergoat, French director
