= Danielle Walker =

Danielle Walker may refer to:

- Danielle Walker (politician) (born 1976), American politician and activist
- Danielle Walker (writer) (born 1985), American food writer
- Danielle Walker (comedian), Australian comedian and actor

== See also ==
- Daniel Walker (disambiguation)
