= James Danieley =

American academic administrator (1924–2016)

J. Earl Danieley

President of Elon College
- In office 1957–1973
- Preceded by: Leon Edgar Smith
- Succeeded by: James Fred Young

Personal details
- Born: July 28, 1924 Burlington, North Carolina
- Died: November 29, 2016 (aged 92) Burlington, North Carolina

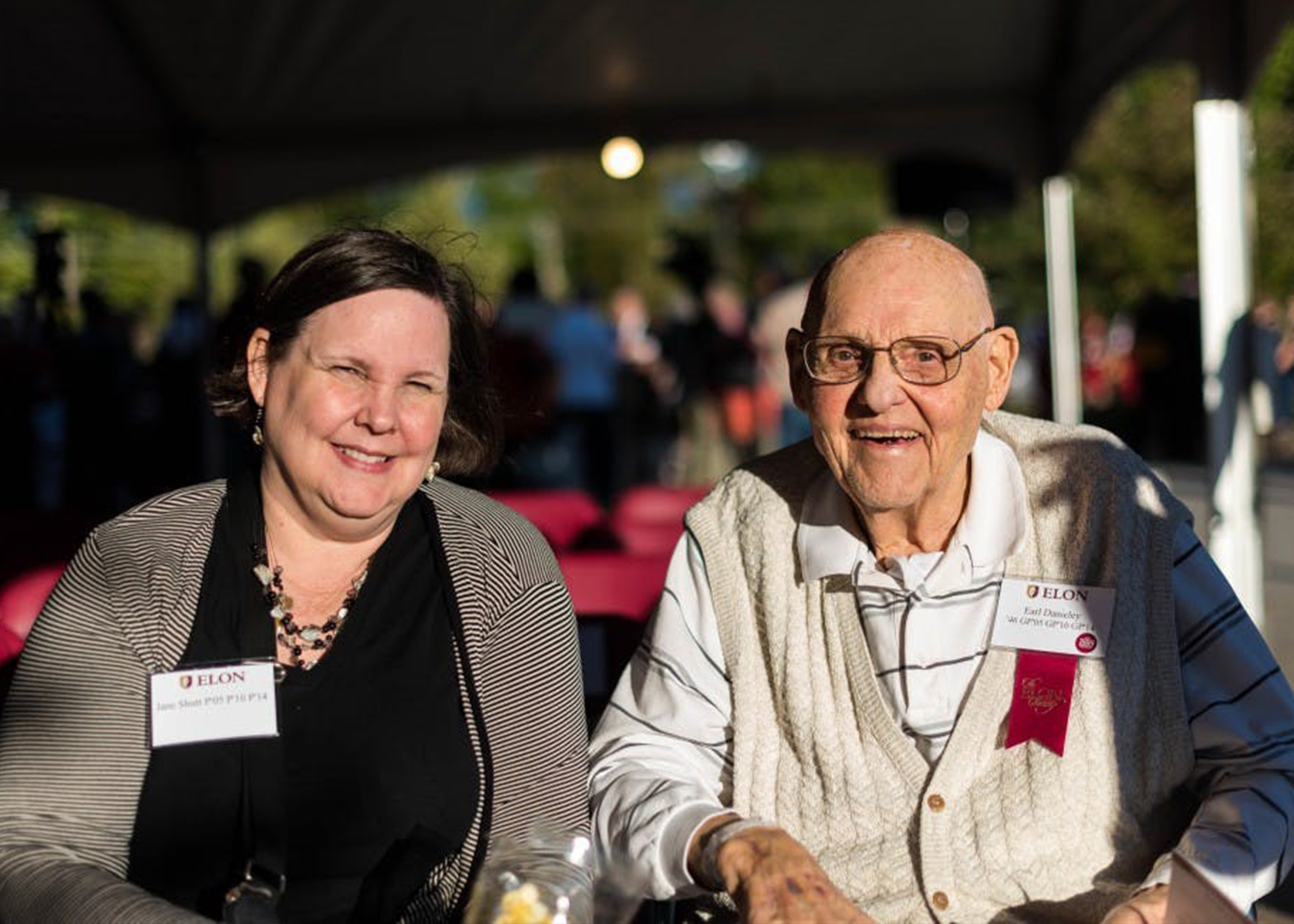
Dr. James Earl Danieley and his daughter Jane Shutt pose for a picture in October 2016.

James Earl Danieley (July 28, 1924 – November 29, 2016) was the sixth president of Elon College (1957–1973), a private college in Elon, North Carolina and has contributed over 60 years of service to the school.

== Early life ==
Danieley grew up in Alamance County, North Carolina. He attended Elon College for his undergraduate education from 1941 to 1946. He then received his graduate degrees in organic chemistry from the University of North Carolina at Chapel Hill and conducted post-doctoral research at Johns Hopkins University.

== Career ==
Danieley was first offered a job as freshman chemistry teacher at Elon College which he gladly accepted. Danieley noted, “There was no question. I loved being at Elon. It was a no-brainer, you don't even have to think about that. I just came right on back." Danieley served as Dean of the college from 1953 to 1956. On July 1, 1957, the board of trustees elected Danieley the sixth president of Elon College, succeeding Leon Edgar Smith who served from 1931 to 1957.

== Accomplishments ==
During his tenure as president of Elon College, one of Danieley's biggest impacts was in athletics. He was known for his innovative ideas in athletics and played a major role in the expansion of women's athletics at Elon College. In 1972, Danieley hired a high school coach from Gibsonville, North Carolina, Kay Yow, to coach the first women's basketball team at Elon. Yow also helped to organize both the first volleyball and softball teams at Elon. Yow became the all-time leader in winning percentage at Elon in both women's basketball and volleyball. Before dying due to cancer, Yow served as the head coach of the women's basketball team at North Carolina State University. Danieley created a solid foundation for soccer, cross country, and every women's sport.

Danieley made the College Board's SAT test a requirement for admission. He also expanded the library, built seven new buildings on campus and admitted Elon's first black students. In 1972 he completed a 3 million dollar fund drive, and implemented Elon's 4-1-4 semester system which still runs today.

Danieley left the presidency post in 1973 to return to his roots as a chemistry teacher at Elon.

== Awards ==
Danieley has been the Thomas E. Powell Jr. Professor of Chemistry since 1982. Danieley was elected to the University of North Carolina Board of Governors in 1983 and served for 12 years. In 1992, Danieley was named president emeritus and remains only one of two presidents in Elon's history along with Leon Edgar Smith (1931–1957) to have received that honor.

== Traditions ==
In 2005, at a men's home basketball game, with 10 minutes remaining in the game, all the students began chanting, “Dr. Danieley.” The first time he acknowledged the crowd by standing and waving but the second time he brought a towel just in case they were to chant his name again. So now it has become a tradition of Elon home men's basketball games to chant his name with Dr. Danieley waving a white towel with around 10 minutes to go in the game.
