= Dan Walker =

Dan, Daniel or Danny Walker may refer to:

- Dan Walker (broadcaster) (born 1977), English sports and current affairs journalist and presenter
- Dan Walker (politician) (1922–2015), American politician and banker who was Governor of Illinois
- Daniel E. Walker (1927–2009), United States Army veteran, known as "Dan Walker", who buried a burned flag
- D. P. Walker (1914–1985), English historian and author
- Danny Walker (born 1999), English rugby league player
- Danny Walker (golfer) (born 1995), American professional golfer
