= Nebria posthuma =

Scientific classification
- Kingdom: Animalia
- Phylum: Arthropoda
- Clade: Pancrustacea
- Class: Insecta
- Order: Coleoptera
- Suborder: Adephaga
- Family: Carabidae
- Genus: Nebria
- Species: N. posthuma

Binomial name
- Nebria posthuma K. Daniel & J. Daniel, 1891

Species of beetle

Nebria posthuma is a species of ground beetle in the Nebriinae subfamily that is endemic to Italy.
