= Daniëlle Hirsch =

Dutch politician (born 1968)

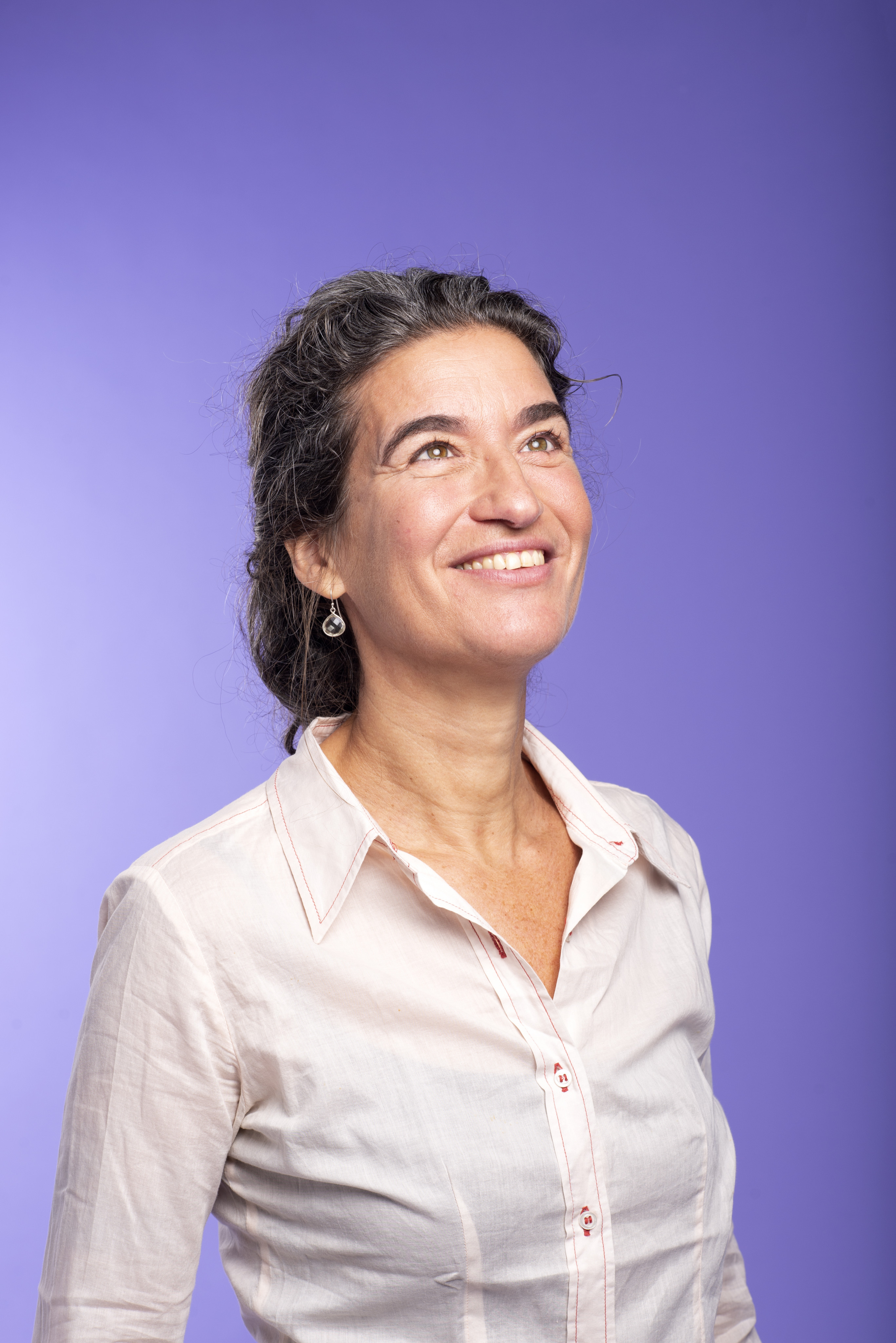
- Hirsch in 2020

Member of the House of Representatives
- In office 6 December 2023 – 11 November 2025

Personal details
- Born: 5 April 1968 (age 58) Amstelveen, Netherlands
- Party: GroenLinks
- Other political affiliations: GroenLinks–PvdA
- Children: 1

Daniëlle Hirsch (born 5 April 1968) is a Dutch economist and politician of GroenLinks, who served in the Dutch House of Representatives between 2023 and 2025.

== Career ==
Hirsch was born in 1968 in Amstelveen. At the age of 20, while studying economics, she moved to Ciudad Nezahualcóyotl, located near Mexico City, with a Mexican friend she had met while working in Israel. In an interview, she told that her one year of experience in the slums transformed her worldview, and de Volkskrant wrote that she had been involved in the fight against economic inequality ever since. Hirsch completed her studies and subsequently advised organizations including the United Nations and the World Bank on water management and international economic relations. From 2008 until 2023, she served as director of Both Ends, an NGO advocating the environment and fair labor practices. The organization was among the plaintiffs of Milieudefensie v Royal Dutch Shell, a 2021 case in which the district court of The Hague ordered the oil and gas company Shell to reduce its carbon emissions. Hirsch was also on an advisory council of the ABN AMRO Bank starting in 2019.

Hirsch first ran for the House of Representatives in the 2017 general election, appearing 41st on the GroenLinks's party list. She was the 16th candidate four years later but was again not elected. At the time, Hirsch was writing opinion pieces for De Helling, the magazine of the party's think tank. She criticized the government's climate policy and its measures to tackle the nitrogen crisis in the Netherlands. In the 2023 general election, she was the 27th candidate on the shared GroenLinks–PvdA list. Her party received 25 seats, but Hirsch was elected due to her 25,012 preference votes. She was the only candidate elected due to meeting the preference vote threshold in the election cycle. Her specialties in the House were international trade, development cooperation and international climate policy. She was not re-elected in October 2025, and her term ended on 11 November.

=== House committee assignments ===
- Committee for Foreign Trade and Development
- Committee for Foreign Affairs
- Committee for Defence
- Contact group United States

== Personal life ==
Hirsch has one child.

== Electoral history ==
Electoral history of Daniëlle Hirsch
Year	Body	Party	Pos.	Votes	Result		Ref.
Year	Body	Party	Pos.	Votes	Party seats	Individual	Ref.
2017	House of Representatives	GroenLinks	41	865	14 / 150	Lost	
2021	House of Representatives	GroenLinks	16	6,981	8 / 150	Lost	
2023	House of Representatives	GroenLinks–PvdA	27	25,012	25 / 150	Won (Note: Hirsch received enough preference votes to be elected despite her party's result.)	
2025	House of Representatives	GroenLinks–PvdA	23	9,583	20 / 150	Lost	
2026	Amsterdam Municipal Council	GroenLinks	36	304	10 / 45	Lost	
2026	Amsterdam-Centrum District Committee	GroenLinks	13 (Note: Hirsch participated as lijstduwer.)	668	3 / 11	Lost	

== See also ==
- List of members of the House of Representatives of the Netherlands, 2023–2025
