= Mariana Bertola =

American educator, physician, and reformer

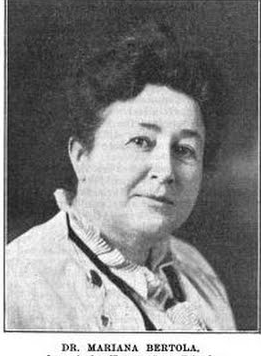
Mariana Bertola, from a 1915 publication.

Mariana Bertola (May 7, 1865 — December 7, 1955) was an American educator, physician, and reformer based in California.

== Early life ==
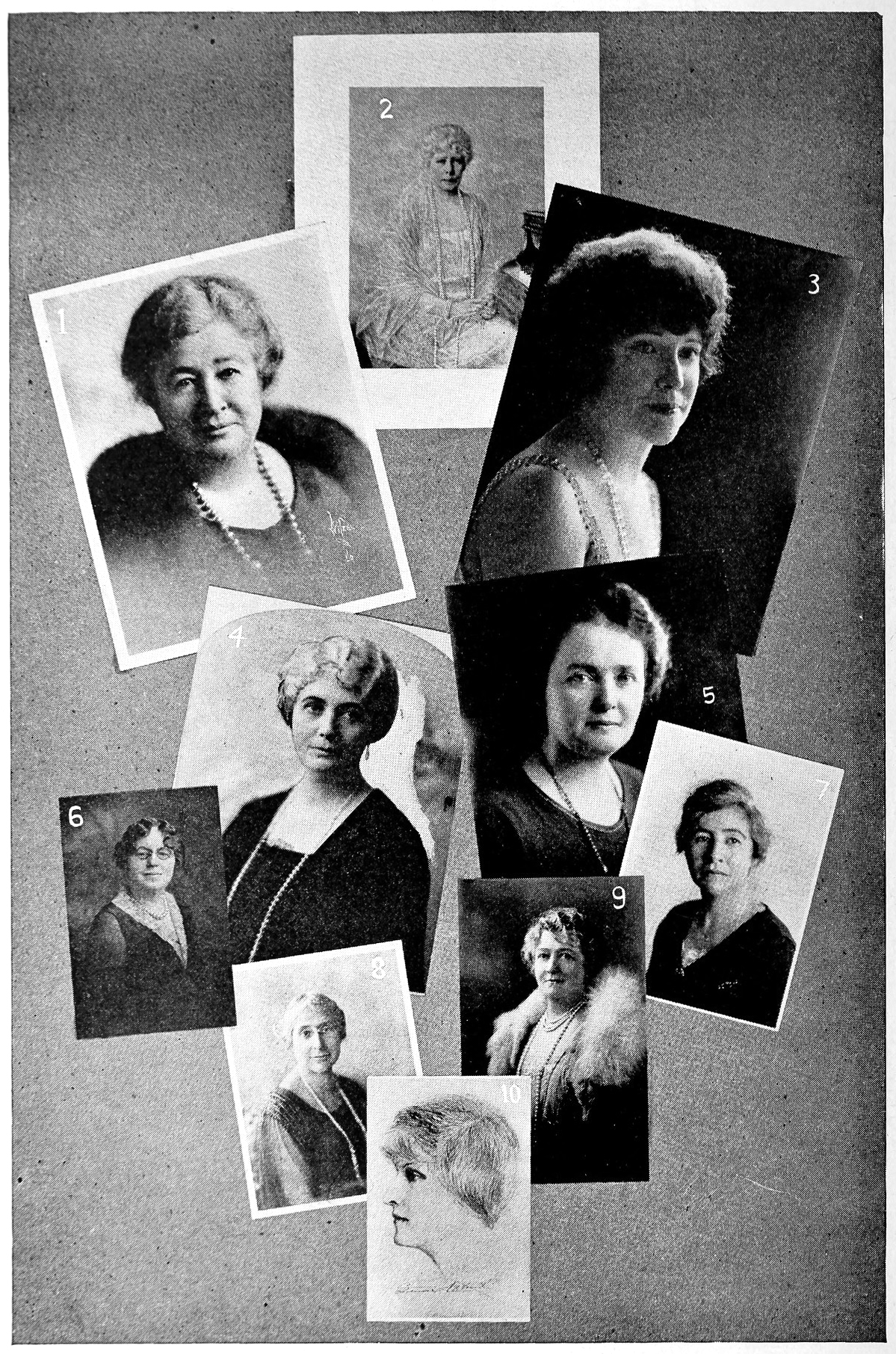
Mariana Bertola, Carrie Jacobs-Bond, May Showler Groves, Minna McGauley, Maud Wilde, Jeanette Lawrence, Miriam Van Waters, David Starr Jordan, Annie Florence Brown, Gertrude Atherton

Mariana Bertola was born in Pacheco, California, the daughter of Italian immigrant parents, Antonio Bertola and Catherine DeVoto Bertola. Her father came to California from Italy by 1852 as a miner, but soon became a grocer and a vineyard operator. Mariana attended San Jose State Normal School and, later, Cooper Medical College at Stanford University, graduating in 1899. She completed her obstetrics internship in 1903.

== Career ==
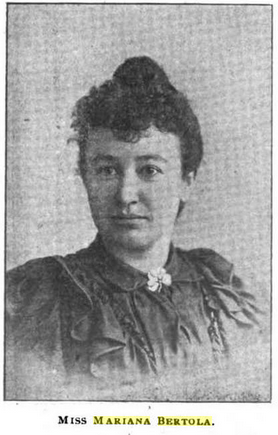
Mariana Bertola, while she was a teacher; from an 1894 publication.

Mariana Bertola started as a teacher; she taught school and was a school principal for seven years, in Martinez, California. While she was a principal, she wrote to John Muir, inviting him to come speak at her school in 1895.

As a doctor, she was a member of the American Medical Association and the San Francisco County Medical Society. She supported the "California Plan," for every county hospital to offer a maternity ward and a children's ward. She was the college physician at Mills College beginning in 1903. She arranged for translators for Italian-speaking patients at San Francisco-area hospitals and gave lectures on health topics in the Italian community and to women's groups throughout the city.

Bertola was an active clubwoman. She served a term as president of the Native Daughters of the Golden West, and helped to create the Native Daughters' Home and Native Daughters' Children's Agency, two philanthropic projects of the women's club. She was also founder in 1909 of the Vittoria Colonna Club for Italian women in San Francisco, and a member of the Cosmopolitan Educational Foundation. She was on the women's board of directors for the Panama–Pacific International Exposition in 1915. Bertola was president of the Travelers' Aid Society in San Francisco, and president of the Woman's Vigilant Committee (WVC), formed in 1921 to protect girls from criminal activity. During the Fatty Arbuckle scandal she was outspoken as head of the WVC on the need for more protections for women in the entertainment industry. She was president of the California Federation of Women's Clubs in 1926 and 1927.

== Personal life ==
Mariana Bertola remained active with women's clubs well into her eighties. She died in 1955, aged 90 years, in San Francisco.

The Bertola Assembly of California Women was named for Mariana Bertola.
