= Pulcherada Abbey =

- Church of Saint Mary of Pulcherada
- Abbazia di Pulcherada
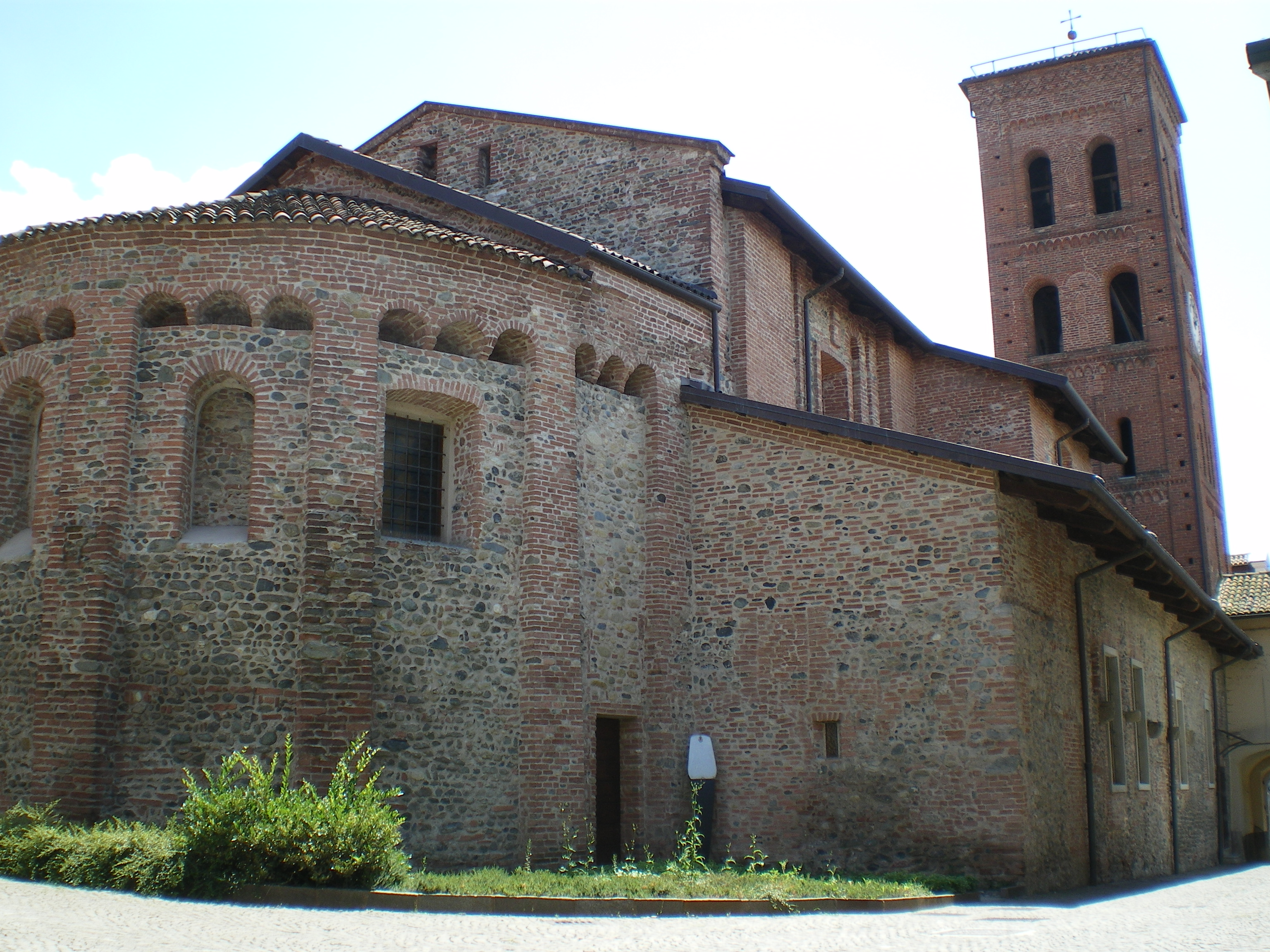
- Apse and bell tower

- Map of Turin
- 45.102736°N 7.766453°E
- Location: San Mauro Torinese
- Country: Italy
- Denomination: Roman Catholic

History
- Dedication: Saint Mary
- Earlier dedication: Saint Maurus

The Church of Saint Mary of Pulcherada (Italian: Chiesa di Santa Maria di Pulcherada), most commonly known as Pulcherada Abbey (Italian: Abbazia di Pulcherada) was an abbey now serving as a Roman Catholic church located in San Mauro Torinese near Turin, Italy.

== History ==
The abbey began to be built between the 6th and 8th century AD on what used to be a Roman encampment. The first section to be built was the apse, and the main building was completed between 1029 and 1031. The bell tower was built within the next 200 years, and was built to be disproportionally taller than the rest of the building, which suggests it might have had defense purposes. The abbey became a center around which a village would start to form and eventually grow to become what is now the comune of San Mauro Torinese.

Before the 17th century, the abbey took up the terrain of what are currently the city hall and the church. The abbey contained gardens, fields for cultivation, a mill, a bakery, and a variety of artisanal workshops. In 1665, because of decay, abbot Petrino Aghemio chose to demolish a large portion of the complex, greatly reducing the size of the abbey. In 1803, the few monks present moved to the nearby abbey of San Quintino di Spigno, and thus Pulcherada Abbey was officially closed down the same year by order of Pope Pius VII. Since then, the former abbey has been used exclusively as a church.
