= Danielle Deckard =

American singer/songwriter (born 1989)

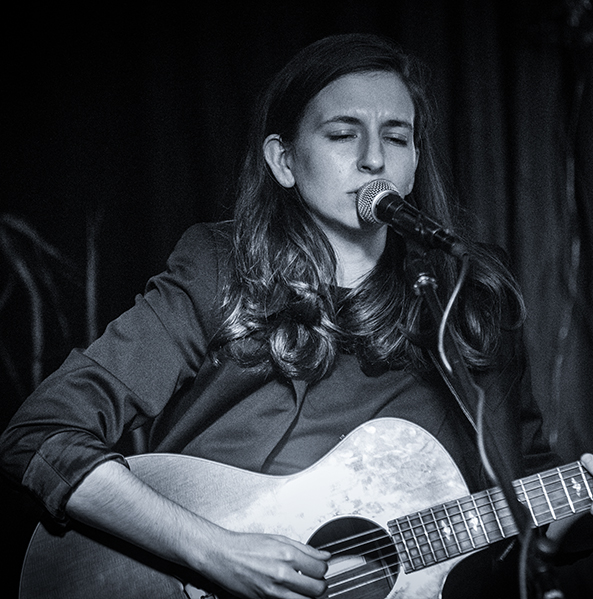
- Danielle performing in Sydney, 2016

Background information
- Birth name: Danielle Renée Deckard
- Born: November 21, 1989 (age 35); Vineland, New Jersey, United States
- Genres: Indie-pop
- Occupation: Singer/Songwriter
- Instruments: Vocals; guitar; keyboard; ukulele
- Years active: 2008–present
- Labels: Danielle Deckard Music
- Website: www.danielledeckard.com

Danielle Renée Deckard (born November 21, 1989) is an American singer/songwriter residing in Sydney, Australia.

Danielle's debut album Happy was released independently in July 2018.

Danielle was the winner of the Unsigned Only Songwriting Competition’s ‘folk/singer-songwriter’ category in 2014 with her song ‘I Lied’. She was the recipient of the 2011 ASCAP Bart Howard Songwriting Scholarship. Danielle's music was used in the CNN documentary "Selling The Girl Next Door".

== Biography ==
Danielle was born in Vineland, New Jersey. She is one of four children of David Deckard Snr., a construction foreman for Madison Concrete Construction of Philadelphia, Pennsylvania, and Denise Deckard, a paediatric nurse. She attended Vineland High School and Berklee College of Music.

== Discography ==
- End Of The World (2015)
- Dancing In The Dark (2017)
- Happy (2018)
