= Catherine Bertola =

British artist

- Born: 5 July 1976 (age 49); Rugby, Warwickshire
- Education: 1995-99 BA (Hons) Fine Art, University of Newcastle
- Known for: Drawings, objects and installations which often draw upon history, collections and people

Catherine Bertola (born 1976) is a British artist. Based in Newcastle upon Tyne, her works consist of drawings, objects and installations which often draw upon history, collections and people. Bertola studied Fine Art at Newcastle University before going on to work on multiple commissions and exhibitions both nationally and internationally.

== Style and themes ==
=== History ===
Bertola follows in the tradition of British artists such as Cornelia Parker and Rachel Whiteread “who excavate the landscape and narratives of the past and present, exploring histories through objects, place and recordings.” Bertola's site specific artworks look beyond the surface of everyday objects and buildings to uncover forgotten and invisible histories of places and people. She is particularly interested in the traces left behind and often incorporates these in new ways in to her works.

=== Time ===
The passing of time is central to her works, and through using mundane everyday objects, Bertola explores how time becomes inscribed and materialised through the things around us. Whether temporary or permanent, Bertola's works themselves are always transient due to the nature of the materials used, meaning that over time her works too will fade and decay.

=== The Role of Women ===
A following theme found in a number of Bertola's works is the historic role of women in society, their craft production and labour.

=== Medium ===
Bertola's works are not medium specific, rather the materials are chosen for their suitability alongside the context in which the work is shown. Often Bertola's works are produced from 'found' objects, which range from dust, wallpaper, paint and thread. Bertola frequently uses these 'found' objects to indicate a particular era, sometimes this is achieved by using them to form a design from a certain period.

== Works ==
One of Bertola's earliest well known works is Hearth (1999), an installation found at the Locomotive Works in Newcastle-upon-Tyne. Using the dust and debris she collected from the floor and walls of the former office of 19th Century engineer George Stephenson, she traced the decorative pattern and outline of a Victorian hearth rug. Dust, a material once described as the matter of history, connects the contemporary space with its past. The found dust is a residue of things that once were, while at the same time revels that the site has been unoccupied for some time. The installation attempts to remind us of our temporal condition whilst also invoking a romantic sense of loss.

Below the Salt (2020) follows a similar approach. Bertola used 42 kg of table salt to transform the Great Hall's floor at Temple Newsam by recreating the pattern of an early 17th Century woven linen tablecloth from the house's collection. In the days when Temple Newsam was home to aristocratic dynasties salt had been considered a status symbol because of its great value. The unavailability of salt to the lower classes gave rise to the phrase 'to be below the salt'. The installation explores the social status and the different occupants of the house over its history, including both those who lived there and the staff who worked there. Once the installation was over, some of the salt was used to develop photographic prints of the work - capturing lasting images of the fleeting installation.

Also developed at Temple Newsam was In the Between Space (2020), a film which featured three female dancers in the tunnel which connects the North and South wings of the Temple Newsam mansion together. The pathway had allowed staff to transport goods around the house and the choreography in the films reflects the repetitive nature of this daily work. The film gives life back to the unused tunnel. The soundtrack was created from recordings of five clocks at Temple Newsam, marking the passing of time within the house. The film draws on two of Bertola's key themes which run through her works, those being the passing of time. and the uncovering of a site's history and people, this being the historic role of lower class women in society.

Earlier in her career, Bertola explored the labour of women in Bluestockings (2009), a series of drawings of the artists' lace tights. The Bluestocking Society was a group of mainly women which emerged in England during the mid 18th Century. The women met in the fashionable London homes of their members to discuss literature and the arts. In 18th Century England working-class women received little if any education, and daughters of wealthy families were educated at the whims of their fathers. Needlework, dancing and music were considered proper 'studies' for women. The women of the Bluestocking Society were tired of being excluded from the company of literate men and of wasting their time on these 'feminine' craft productions. They became patrons to women's art and education. Each of Bertola's drawings is named after one of the original members of this society. The work creates a juxtaposition between this pioneering circle of women and their working class contemporaries who produced their undergarments. The production of lace is rooted in anonymous female labour and the material itself has become characteristically feminine, domestic and sexualised through time. Bluestockings was shown at Bertola's solo exhibition Unseen by all but me alone at Workplace Gateshead from 10 October - 7 November 2009. The exhibition drew on the historic role of women and craft production.

== Solo exhibitions ==
- 2005: Domestic Landscapes, International 3, Manchester
- 2006: The Property of Two Gentlemen, Firstsite, Colchester
- 2007: Prickings, Nottingham Castle Museum and Art Gallery, and Fabrica, Brighton in 2006
- 2008: Over the Teacups, M R Fricke, Berlin
- 2009: Unseen By all But Me Alone, Workplace Gallery, Gateshead
- 2009: Out of the Ordinary: Spectacular Craft, Millennium Gallery, Sheffield
- 2010: Scion, Beacon Art Project, Brighton Court, Somerset
- 2011: To be Forever Known, Brontë Parsonage Museum, Haworth
- 2012: Swept Away: Dust, Ashes and Dirt in Contemporary Art and Design, Museum of Arts and Design, New York
- 2013: Sad Bones, Workplace Gallery, Gateshed
- 2013: Flicker, Gawthorpe Hall, Lancashire
- 2015: Invisible Cities, Hatton Gallery, Newcastle Upon Tyne
- 2015: Acts of Making, The Shipley Art Gallery, Gateshead
- 2015: Invisible Cities, Hatton Gallery, Newcastle Upon Tyne

== Collections ==
A number of Bertola's works belong to the collections of: Leeds Art Gallery, Laing Art Gallery, Whitworth Art Gallery, Simmons & Simmons, London and various private collections in Europe, America and Canada.

== Commissions ==
Bertola has worked on a number of temporary and permanent commissions including work for: V&A (London, UK), National Museum Wales (Cardiff, UK), Government Art Collection (UK), The National Trust and National Trust for Scotland (UK), Vital Arts (London, UK), Leeds City Art Gallery Collection (Leeds, UK) and Locus+ (Newcastle upon Tyne, UK).
