= Danielle Posthuma =

Dutch behavioural geneticist (born 1972)

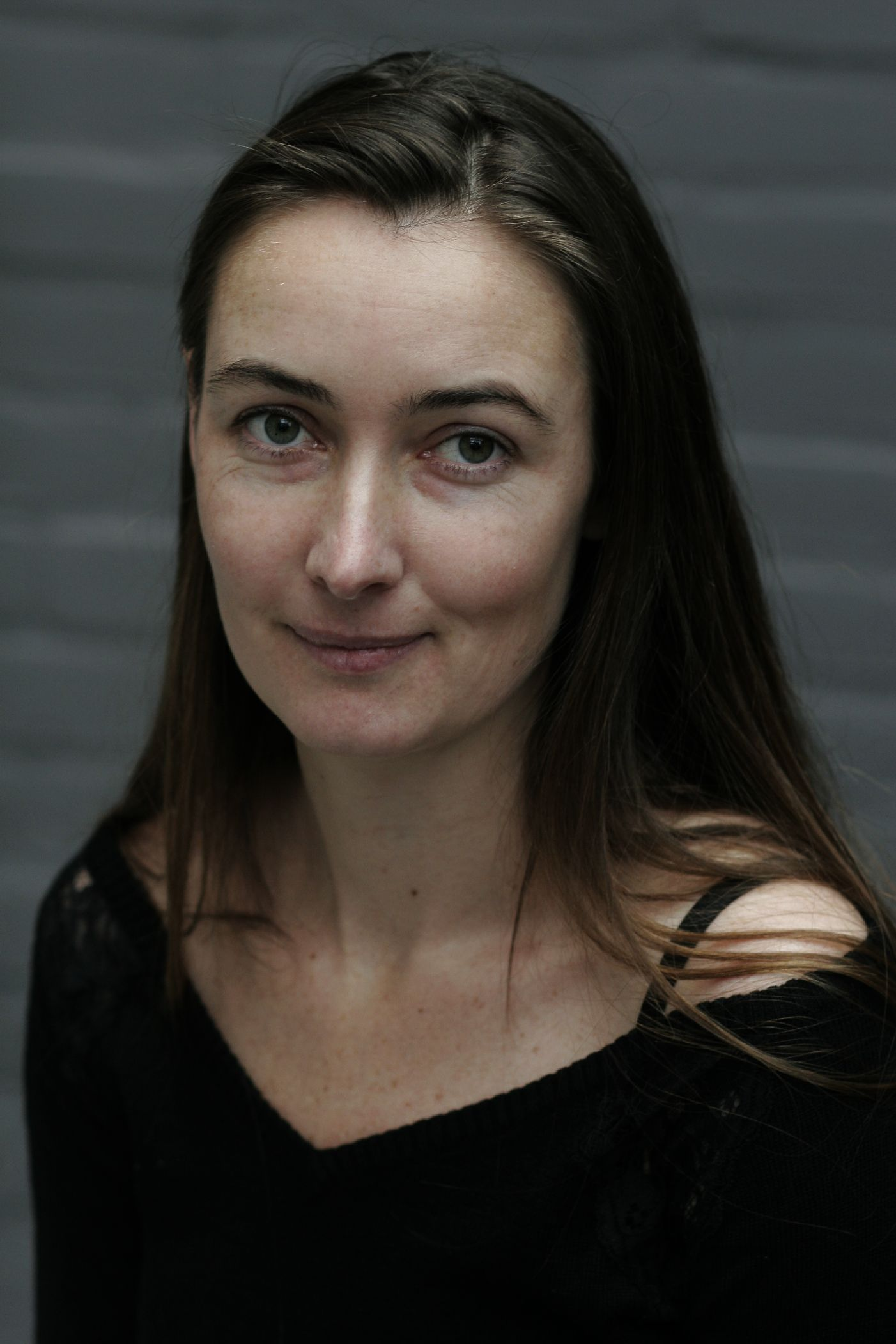
- Born: 1972 (age 53–54)
- Education: VU University Amsterdam
- Known for: Statistical genetics and GWASs of cognitive and psychiatric traits
- Awards: 2006 Fuller and Scott Award from the Behavior Genetics Association
- Scientific career
- Fields: Psychiatry; Statistical genetics; Behavioural genetics
- Institutions: VU University Amsterdam

Danielle Posthuma (born 1972) is a Dutch behavior and psychiatric geneticist who specializes in statistical genetics. She is a University Research Chair professor at VU University Amsterdam, where she is also head of the Department of Complex Trait Genetics. She has been a member of the Young Academy of the Royal Dutch Academy of Sciences since 2005. Danielle Posthuma was appointed a URC professor on 1 January 2016.

== Biography ==
Posthuma completed three MSc’s in clinical and biological psychology and medical anthropology before she graduated cum laude with her PhD in 2002 at the VU University Amsterdam.

She is known for studying the genetics of psychiatric and cognitive traits, including schizophrenia, neuroticism, Alzheimer's disease, insomnia, as well as genetics of intelligence, which she first became interested in researching in the 1990s. In 2019 Posthuma became a member of the Royal Netherlands Academy of Arts and Sciences.

== Honors ==
- Scott Fuller Memorial Award from the International Behavior Genetics Association (2005), for early career outstanding scientific achievements
- Richard Todd award for outstanding contributions to child psychiatry, from the International Society for Psychiatric Genetics (2017)
- Lodewijk Sandkuijl award for contributions to statistical genetics from the Dutch Society of Human Genetics (2019)
- Elected as one of the 400 most successful women, in the category ‘smart’, under the age of 38 in the Netherlands (2008, 2009 and 2010)
- Mensa Foundation Prize, which is awarded biennially for the best scientific discovery in the field of intelligence or creativity (2021)
