= Jean Bertola =

Jean Bertola (1922, La Roche-sur-Foron – 1989) was a French pianist, composer, singer, music arranger and artistic director.

== Biography ==
A talented pianist, he worked in a Lyon radio station putting music to texts sent by listeners. He later started arranging for many renowned artists including Charles Aznavour in his début. He won the disc prize in 1957. After a career in singing melodies, he became artistic director with the French label Polydor. A singer songwriter, he became close and artistic secretary for Georges Brassens and backup vocalist on some of Brassens' albums in the 1970s.

He released his own album Dernières chansons in 1982, with text and music from Brassens, and a second album in 1985 titled Le Patrimoine de Brassens.

== Sources ==
- Louis-Jean Calvet, Cent ans de chanson française, Paris, Éditions L'Archipel, coll. "Archi Poche", 2006, 520 p. (Re-editions of a book first published by Éditions du Seuil in 1972)
