= Danièle Kergoat =

French academic and feminist sociologist

Danièle Kergoat (born 30 June 1942) is a French academic and feminist sociologist. Her research focuses on gender and social relations of sex, work, social movements, the power to act.

== Biography ==
Danièle Kergoat was born on 30 June 1942. In her early career, she worked as a teacher. In 1965, she began working as a researcher. In 1971, she became a Statutory Research Officer, and a full Researcher in 1978. The following year, she joined the "Center for Sociological Studies" (CES). In 1984, she became the director of the GEDISST research group, and in 2007, her title changed to Research Director Emeritus at the CNRS. She was associated with the Centre de Recherches Sociologiques et Politiques de Paris GTM - CRESPPA.

Kergoat is a professor, a member of the RING research center, and the author of books on women, gender and work. Her research and writings include the "sexual division of labor", whether professional or domestic. She is one of the authors who defended a conception of "social sex relations", which aims to give a materialistic basis to the analysis of the relations between men and women in a capitalist society. She directed the doctoral thesis of Xavier Dunezat, and participated in several juries awarding the Habilitation to direct research including Frédéric Charles, Roland Pfefferkorn, and Christine Mennesson.

== Selected works ==
- Les ouvrières, Paris, le Sycomore, 1982
- Les femmes et le travail à temps partiel, étude réalisée pour le Service des études et de la statistique du Ministère du travail, de l'emploi et de la formation professionnelle, Groupe d'étude sur la division sociale et sexuelle du travail, 1984 (ISBN 2-11-001352-4)
- «Travail et affects. Les ressorts de la servitude domestique », 2002
- « Division sexuelle du travail et rapports sociaux de sexe », 2000
- « Penser la différence des sexes : rapports sociaux et division du travail entre les sexes », 2005
- with Yvonne Guichard-Claudic (dir.), Inversion du genre : corps au travail et travail des corps, 2007
- with Philippe Cardon et Roland Pfefferkorn (dir.), Chemins de l'émancipation et rapports sociaux de sexe, 2009
- Se battre, dissent-elles..., 2012
- Galerand Elsa et Danièle Kergoat, ", 2014
