= Afro Blue (choir) =

American a cappella jazz ensemble

Afro Blue is an a cappella jazz ensemble at Howard University, directed by Connaitre Miller. They have released 4 albums.

== The Sing-Off ==
The version of Afro Blue that performed on The Sing-Off season 3 went on to create the group Traces of Blue.
