= Danijela =

Danijela is a Slavic feminine given name, cognate of Danielle.

The name "Daniel" originates from the Hebrew Bible and is associated with the prophet Daniel. In Hebrew, the name is composed of two elements: **"Dani"** (דני), meaning "judges me," and **"El"** (אל), meaning "God." Together, the name translates to "God is my judge

Notable people with the name include:

- Danijela, stage name of Danijela Martinović (born 1971), Croatian pop singer
- Danijela Cabric, American electrical engineer
- Danijela Dimitrovska (born 1987), Serbian model
- Danijela Đurović (born 1973), Montenegrin politician
- Danijela Stefanović, Serbian Egyptologist
- Danijela Grgić (born 1988), Croatian runner
- Danijela Ilić (born 1970), Serbian basketball player
- Danijela Nestorović (born 1974), Serbian activist and politician
- Danijela Rundqvist (born 1984), Swedish ice hockey player
- Danijela Simić (born 1969), Serbian rhythmic gymnast
- Danijela Stojadinović (born 1969), Serbian politician
- Danijela Štajnfeld (born 1984), Serbian actress and filmmaker of Jewish origin
- Danijela Veljović (born 1977), Serbian politician
- Danijela Veselinović (born 1993), Serbian trumpet player
- Danijela Vujičić (born 1978), Serbian politician

== See also ==
- Danijel
