= Gatarić =

Gatarić (Serbian: Гатарић) is a South Slavic surname that may refer to:

- Dalibor Gatarić (born 1986), Bosnian-German football player
- Danijel Gatarić (born 1986), Bosnian-German football player, twin brother of Dalibor
- Nikola Gatarić (born 1992), footballer
- Danijel Gatarić (born 1988), Serbian writer from Bosnia & Herzegovina
