= Danijel =

Danijel is masculine given name of Slovene, Croatian, and Serbian origin. Notable people with the name include:

- Danijel Aleksić (born 1991), Serbian footballer
- Danijel Alibabić (born 1988), Montenegrin singer and songwriter
- Danijel Brezič (born 1976), Slovenian football midfielder
- Danijel Cesarec (born 1983), Croatian footballer
- Danijel Ćulum (born 1989), Bosnian football player
- Danijel Demšar (born 1954), Slovene painter and illustrator of children's books
- Danijel Dežmar (born 1988), Slovenian footballer
- Danijel Furtula (born 1992), Montenegrin discus thrower
- Danijel Gašić (born 1987), Serbian football defender
- Danijel Gatarić (born 1986), Bosnian-German footballer
- Danijel Hrman (born 1975), Croatian football midfielder
- Danijel Jumić (born 1986), Croatian football striker
- Danijel Jusup (born 1961), Croatian basketball coach
- Danijel Klarić (born 1995), Austrian footballer
- Danijel Koncilja (born 1990), Slovenian volleyball player
- Danijel Kovacic (born 1987), German ice hockey goaltender
- Danijel Krivić (born 1980), Bosnian football defender
- Danijel Ljuboja (born 1978), Serbian football forward
- Danijel Mađarić (born 1977), Croatian football goalkeeper
- Danijel Mandic (born ), Croatian actor
- Danijel Marčeta (born 1989), Slovenian footballer
- Danijel Majkić (born 1987), Bosnian footballer
- Danijel Mićić (born 1988), Austrian footballer
- Danijel Mihajlović (born 1985), Serbian footballer
- Danijel Milićević (born 1986), Bosnian footballer
- Danijel Milovanović (born 1973), Swedish football player
- Danijel Miškić (born 1993), Croatian football midfielder
- Danijel Morariju (born 1991), Serbian football defender
- Danijel Nizic (born 1995), Australian footballer
- Danijel Pavlović (born 1985), Serbian singer–songwriter and television personality
- Danijel Petković (born 1993), Montenegrin football goalkeeper
- Danijel Popović (footballer) (1982–2002), Croatian footballer
- Danijel Pranjić (born 1981), Croatian professional footballer
- Danijel Premerl (1904–1975), Croatian football player
- Danijel Premuš (born 1981), Croatian-Italian water polo player
- Danijel Prskalo (born 1990), Bosnia and Herzegovina-born and Austria-based Croatian footballer
- Danijel Radiček (born 1980), Croatian football midfielder
- Danijel Rašić (born 1988), Croatian football player
- Danijel Romić (born 1993), Croatian football player
- Danijel Šarić (born 1977), handball goalkeeper for the Qatari national team
- Danijel Sraka (born 1975), Slovenian film director and producer
- Danijel Štefulj (born 1973), Croatian football player
- Danijel Stojanović (born 1984), Croatian footballer
- Danijel Stojković (born 1990), Serbian football defender
- Danijel Subašić (born 1984), Croatian footballer
- Danijel Subotić (born 1989), Swiss footballer
- Danijel Vušković (born 1981), Croatian footballer
- Danijel Zagorac (born 1987), Croatian football player
- Danijel Žeželj (born 1966), Croatian comic book artist, painter and illustrator
- Danijel Zlatković (born 1996), Serbian football player

== See also ==
- Daniel
- Danijela
