= Rosenheim =

- Town
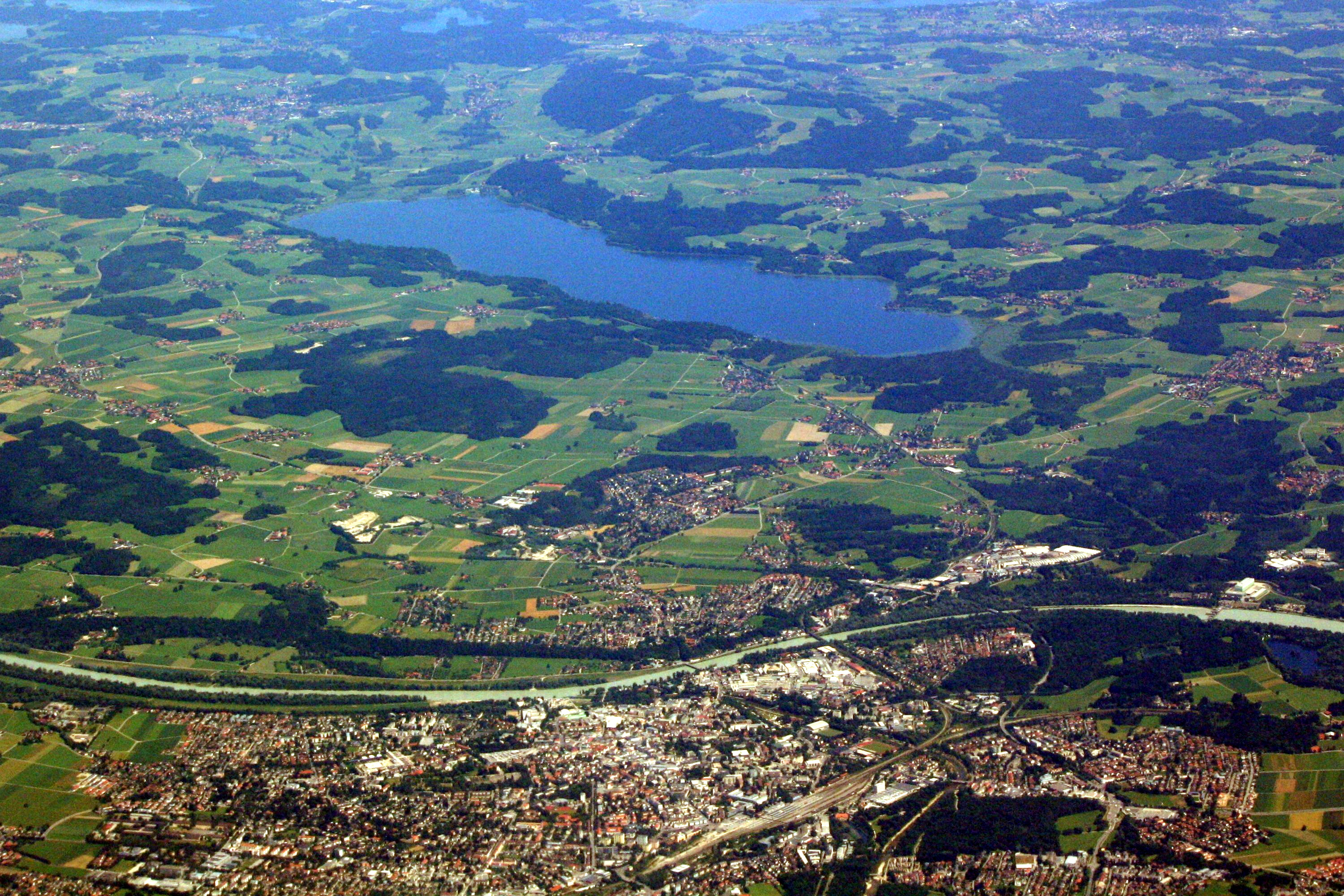
- Aerial view of Rosenheim (foreground) and Simssee (background); in between from left to right the Inn river

- Flag Coat of arms
- Interactive map of Rosenheim
- Location within Germany Location within Bavaria
- Coordinates: 47°51′N 12°8′E
- Country: Germany
- State: Bavaria
- Admin. region: Oberbayern
- District: urban district

Government
  - Mayor (since 2026): Abuzar Erdogan (SPD)

Area
  - Total: 37.22 km^{2} (14.37 sq mi)
- Elevation: 440–470 m (1,440–1,540 ft)

Population (2025-12-31)
  - Total: 65,808
  - Density: 1,768/km^{2} (4,579/sq mi)
- Time zone: UTC+01:00 (CET)
  - Summer (DST): UTC+02:00 (CEST)
- Postal codes: 83001-83028
- Dialling codes: 08031
- Vehicle registration: RO
- Website: rosenheim.de

Rosenheim (German pronunciation: [ˈʁoːzn̩ˌhaɪm]) is a city in Bavaria, Germany. It is an independent city located in the centre of the district of Rosenheim in Upper Bavaria, and is also the seat of its administration. It is located on the west bank of the Inn at the confluence of the rivers Inn and Mangfall, in the Bavarian Alpine Foreland. It is the third-largest city in Upper Bavaria with over 64,000 inhabitants. Rosenheim is the economic centre and the busiest place in the region.

== Geography ==
The population of the actual city is approximately 60,000 inhabitants with up to 125,000 in the surrounding area. Rosenheim is situated in the Upper-Bavarian Alpine Foothills, 450 metres (1,476 feet) above sea level and covers an area of 37.52 square kilometres (14.49 sq mi). The capital of Bavaria, Munich, is 52 kilometres (32 miles) North-West of Rosenheim. Rosenheim station is at the junction of the Munich–Rosenheim, the Rosenheim–Salzburg and the Munich–Innsbruck lines.

The landscape around Rosenheim was formed during the last ice age from the advancement of the Inn Valley Glacier and later the Rosenheim lake. The lake existed about 10,000 years ago, covering the whole Inn valley as far as Wasserburg am Inn, about 25 km (16 mi) north of Rosenheim.

Even today in many places around the city the former shoreline can be recognised where the former flat lake bed changes suddenly into relatively steep embankment.

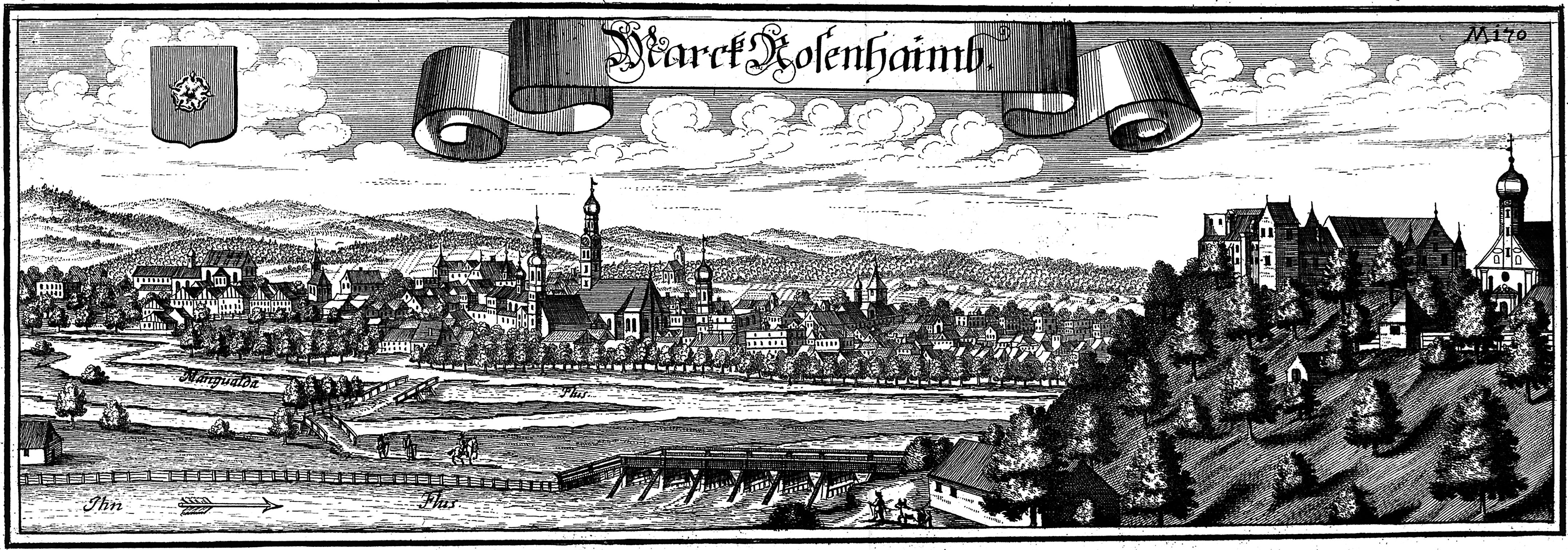
View of Rosenheim in 1701

== History ==
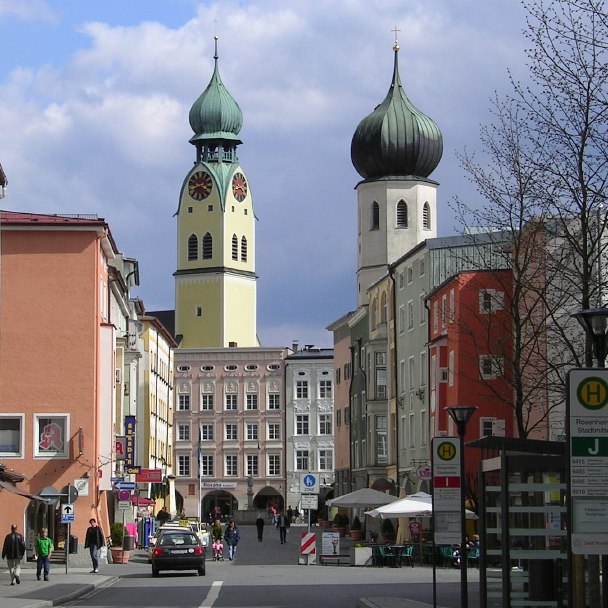
Rosenheim, churches St. Nikolaus and Heilig Geist

Rosenheim's development can be traced from its location on intersecting major trade routes. Even in early times, the town's intersecting traffic stimulated its development as a market town. It subsequently evolved from a market to a salt trade and then railway town to today's wood and college city.

=== Pons Aeni ===
Crucial to the establishment of Rosenheim were the Inn and the corresponding Inn valley. The Romans arrived in the year 15 BC under the leadership of Drusus and Tiberius. They founded the province Noricum to the East of the Inn and Rhaetia to the west of the Inn. The colonizers built a road through the Brenner to Castra Regina, and an east–west road from Iuvavum to Augusta Vindelicum. The intersection of these two enormously important trade routes were protected by a military station whose name was "Pons Aeni". Less frequently used terms were "Ponte Aoni", "Ad enum" or "stations Enensis". The Romano Celtic settlement existed for some 500 years with that name. Pons was between Aeni Isinisca (Aying) and Bedaium (today part of Seeon-Seebruck), as shown on the Roman road map Tabula Peutingeriana from the 4th century. The name "Pons Aeni" can still be recognised in local place names, "Pfunzen" in the name of the district "Langenpfunzen" and "Leonhardspfunzen".

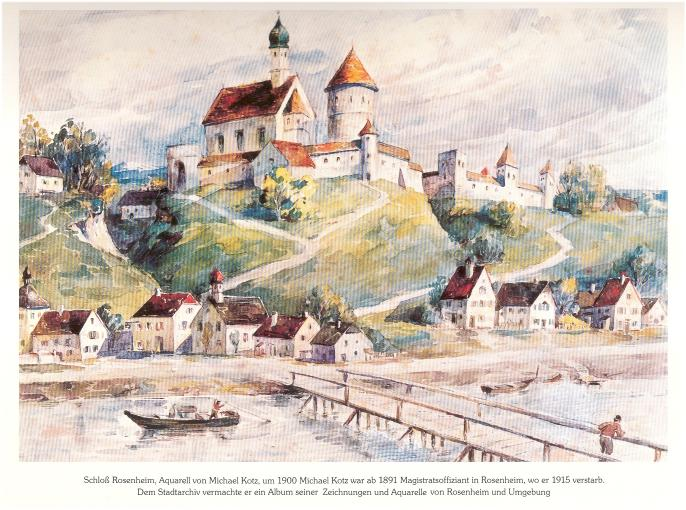
Schloss Rosenheim in 1900, watercolour by Michael Kotz

=== Etymology ===
The origin of the city's name is not entirely clear. First mentioned in 1234, Rosenheim castle is on the eastern bank of the Inn, on today's castle hill, overlooking a new bridge over the Inn. One theory is that the name comes from the Rosenheim Rose emblem of the Wasserburger Earl Hall, who built the castle. Another theory is that the name Ross derives from the Rössern steeds that were used in medieval times to pull the river transport vessels, and for which there were large stables in Rosenheim. The street names Am Esbaum (the tree on which the horses were grazing) or Am Roßacker add some weight to this suggestion.

A third theory suggests that there could be a kindred word Roas, Roze or Ried, that used to mean swamp and peat bogs, which are still to be found around Rosenheim – evident also by the name of the neighboring town of Rosenheim Kolbermoor. An example of the old names, the nearby village of Riedering. Another theory is that the name is also derived from Rosenheim personal names Roso/Hrodo. Yet another theory is based on the fact that "Rose" used to mean a beautiful girl. It was well known among the Inn boatmen that there were many beauties to admire in this town. The sailors of the town liked to control what was called "home of the Rose" – in other words, Rosenheim.

=== Development of Rosenheim ===
At about the time of the first mention of Rosenheim castle in 1234, a settlement of boatmen developed on the western shore. The area around the Inn Bridge was not developed for a long time due to marshy soil at the proximity of the mouth of the river Mangfall, so the settlement was located several hundred meters away. The centre of Rosenheim is therefore not directly on the riverside.

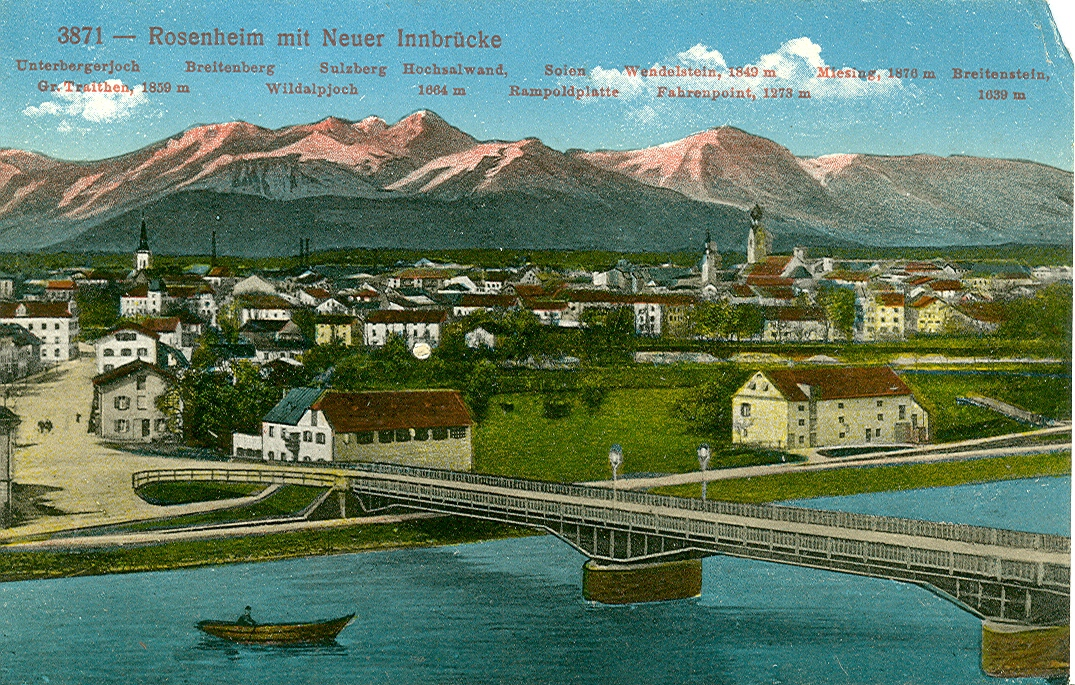
Rosenheim and new Inn bridge on the postcard

=== Market Rosenheim ===
The town quickly grew in importance as a hub for all types of goods that were transported on the Inn (livestock, grain, silk, arms, salt) and in 1328 received Market town status. The Rosenheim ship masters made Rosenheim very wealthy during this era through the transport of goods, due to the location between Hall in Tirol the Inn and onwards to the Danube down to Vienna and Budapest. Until about 1600 the settlement had grown into one of the largest and most important markets in Bavaria, even though town privileges were only attained in 1864 from the Bavarian King Ludwig II.

Rosenheim experienced economic decline during the 17th century in the wake of the decline of Inn Shipping Company and the consequences of the Thirty Years' War. There was also a plague epidemic in 1634 and a market fire in 1641.

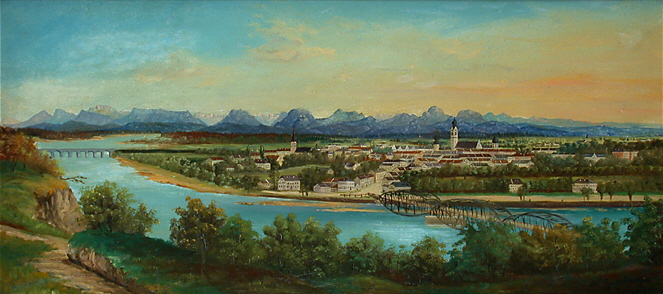
Rosenheim in the 19th century; the Inn river in the foreground; the Alps in the background

In the 19th century Rosenheim developed as an economic centre in the Southeast of Bavaria due to brine. In 1810 an early type of wooden pipeline brought brine from the Reichenhall and Traunstein salt mines to Rosenheim. Boiling the brine to make salt made Rosenheim the centre of Bavarian salt production until 1958.

Expansion of the railways brought early connection to the railway network. In 1858 Rosenheim station was inaugurated, however it would soon be too small and prove a hindrance for further urban development. In 1876 the station moved to its present site. The old railway line was the straight through road (now the city hall and Prince Regent Street, main Rosenheimer transport axis, from the northwest to the southeast of the city), the roundhouse of the original station is now an exhibition centre. The old station is directly opposite the 1878 City Hall and is used in the ZDF evening series "Die Rosenheim-Cops" as the police headquarters backdrop.

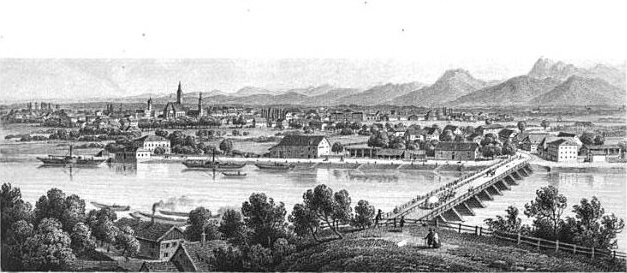
Rosenheim about 1860

The economic boom of the late 19th and early 20th century made the Gründerzeit – and Art Nouveau (and its regional characteristics, the Swiss chalet style) the most important architectural style, which now determines the townscape. The evangelical Church of the Redeemer was built in the neo-Gothic clinker brick style, which is rare for Rosenheim, for the growing Evangelical Lutheran congregation in the official district around today's town hall.

At the beginning of the 20th century, Rosenheim had nine breweries which are preserved in the names of some restaurants (Duschl-, Hof-, Mail-, Pernloher-, Stern-, Weißbräu). The only survivors being "Auerbräu" and "Flötzinger Bräu" who supply the "Märzen" for the "Rosenheimer Herbstfest" as well as the Bierbichler Weißbräu, among others.

=== Rosenheim in the Nazi era ===
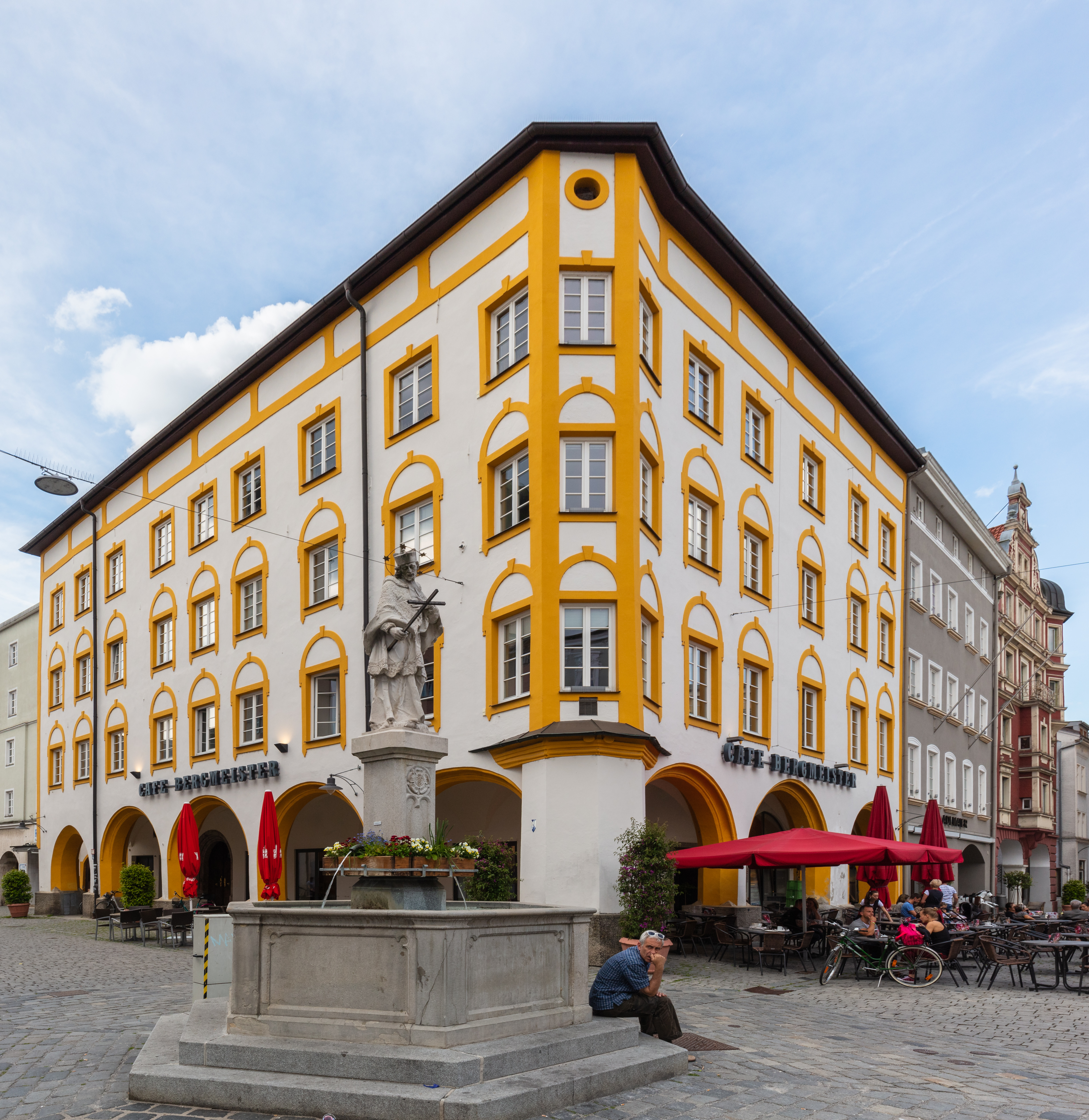
Nepomuk statue

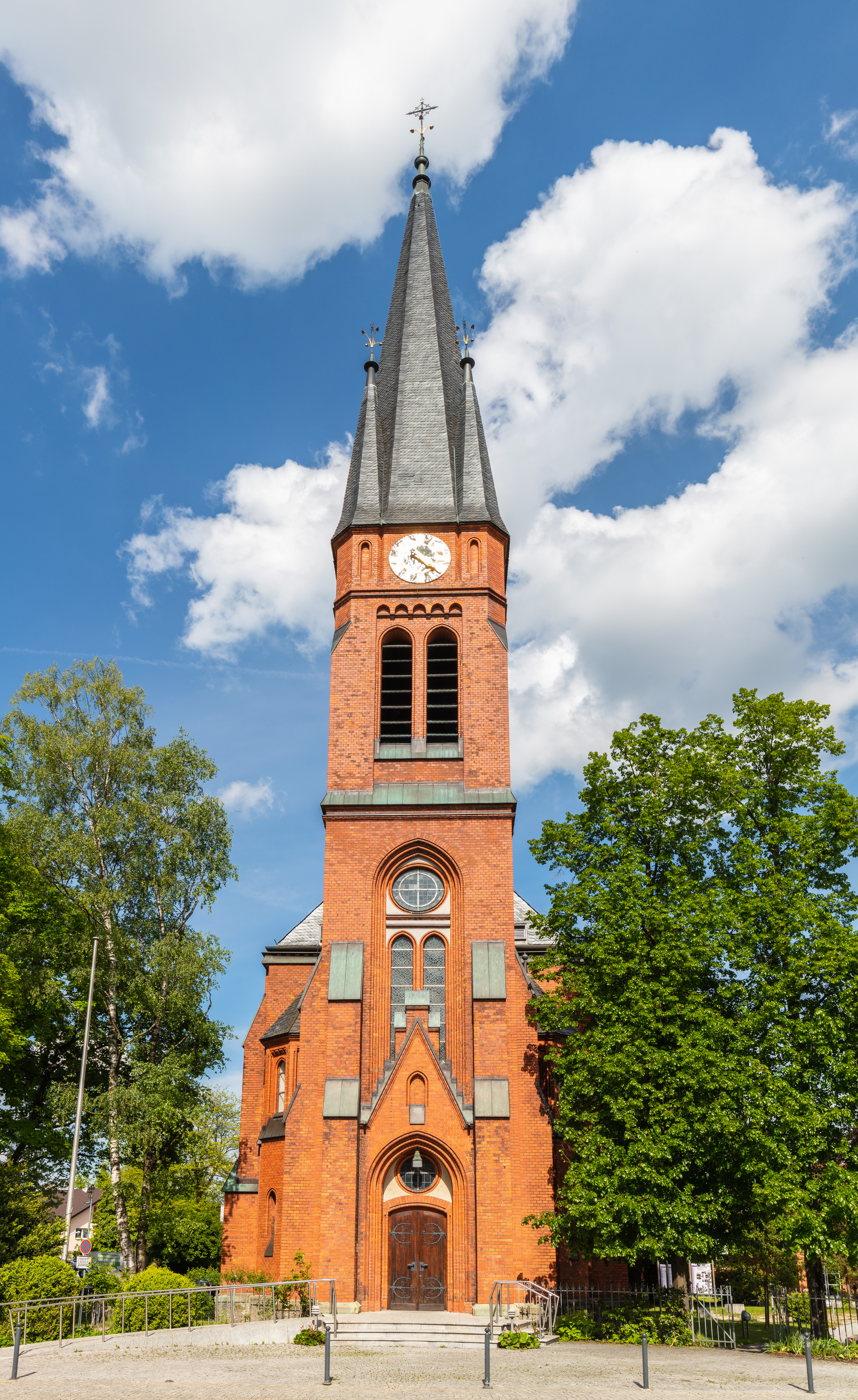
Redeemer church

The number of Jews living in Rosenheim was high compared to other Bavarian cities. At the start of the 20th century the Jewish community consisted of about 50 people. A request was made to the city council for establishment of a separate Jewish religious association, with reference to the Bavarian-Jewish legislation, but it was refused, so the Rosenheim Jews remained attached to the state capital, where their dead also had to be buried. Even the funeral of the First World War fallen son of a Jewish merchant based in Rosenheim at the city cemetery was refused and was "the biggest disappointment and the bitterest pain" for the father.

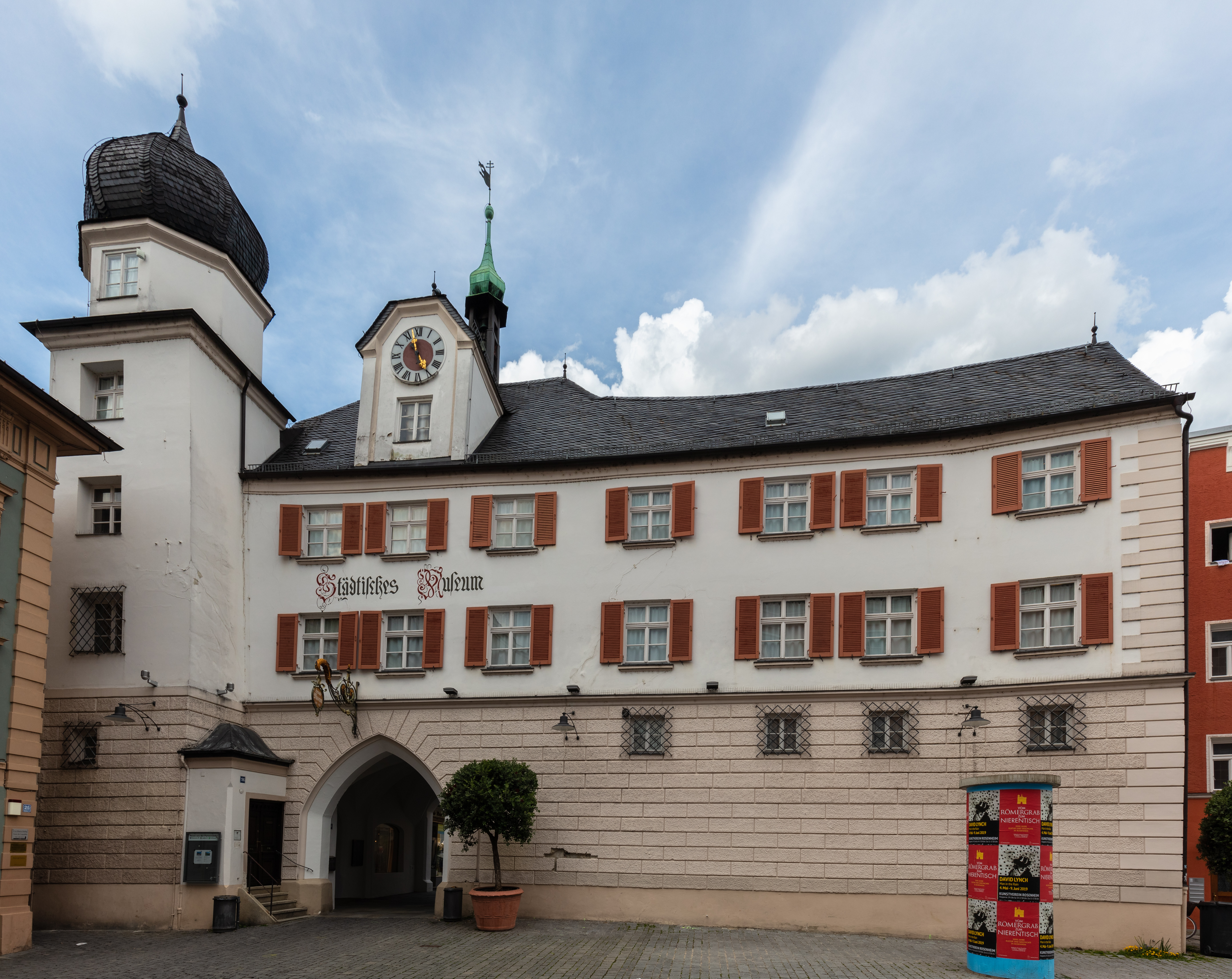
Mittertor, old city entrance

With the creation of the first local Nazi group outside of Munich in 1920, the Rosenheim Jews saw increasing hostility. Centre of hate campaigns was the Rosenheim School. A scandal occurred in June 1920, after a reader accused the writer of a letter titled "Rosenheimer Jews" in the local press, who wanted to repeal the provisions of the Versailles Treaty and held military exercises at the Rosenheim School. Seven members of the high school and a member of the "Chiemgau" then raided a villa inhabited by Jews in the Herbststrasse. The college of the city of Rosenheim, on 29 July 1920 came to the conclusion that

... es sei bedauerlich, dass die Bewegung zur Bekämpfung eines volksausbeuterischen Judentums [...], die in ihrem Wesen gewiß berechtigt sei, durch solche Auswüchse in Mißkredit komme.

"... it was regrettable that the people's movement to fight exploitative Jews[...], which certainly was justified in its nature, has been discredited."

Protests of the Bavarian Jewish Central Association were unsuccessful, only an unmistakable message of the Bavarian Interior Ministry September 1920 was able to maintain peace.

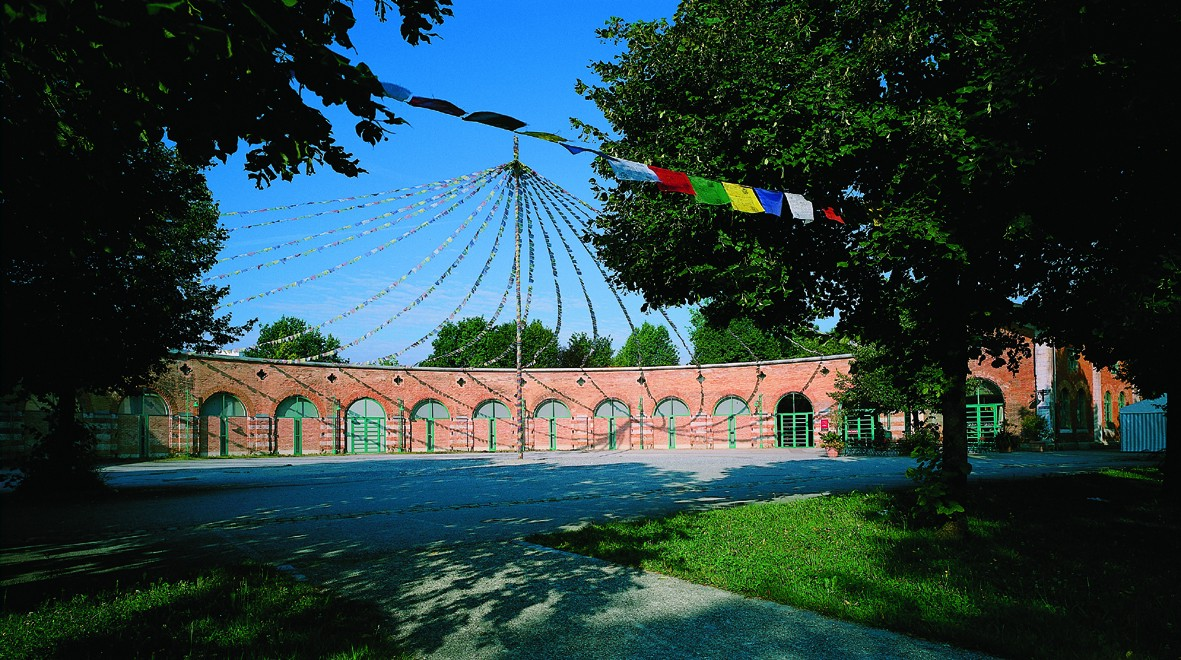
Lokschuppen exhibition centre

On 1 April 1933, shortly after the Nazi seizure of power, guards were set up in front of Jewish shops, warning against buying in these stores but to desist assault and criminal damage. A large proportion of the population ignored these calls. The shops were therefore still frequented, much to the annoyance of Nazi activists who acted with the backing of then-Mayor Gmelch. Despite the support of the population, six of the eleven Jewish business owners gave up their businesses by 1937.

The assassination of German diplomat Ernst vom Rath by the Polish Jewish teenager Herschel Grynszpan on 7 November 1938 in Paris was taken as the pretext for Kristallnacht, a final opportunity to strike against the Jews. The SA came with 8 to 10 men on 10 November at 3–4 o'clock in the morning to the last two Jewish shops, and destroyed their inventory and merchandise.

The fate of many Rosenheim Jews is documented. Those who could emigrate did so, mostly to the United States. However, many failed entry and exit applications, and many died in concentration camps.

=== Bombing during World War II ===
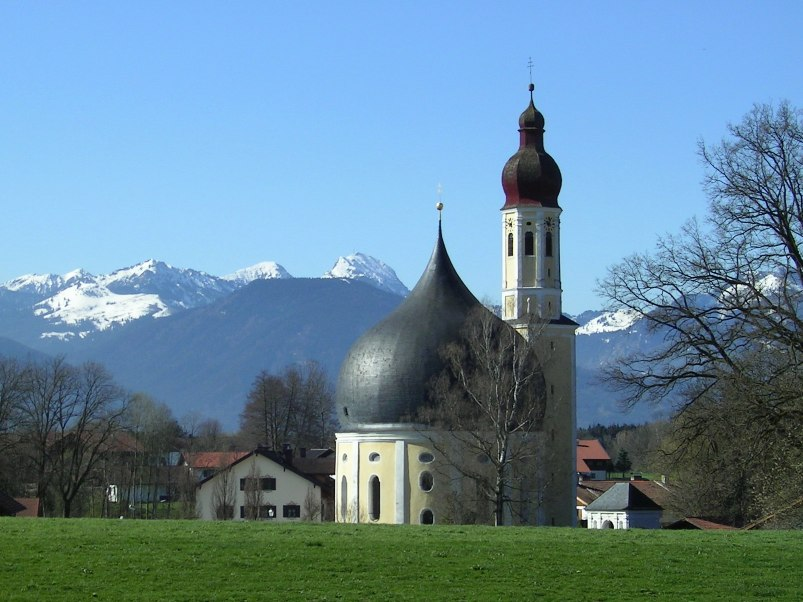
St. John the Baptist church and Bavarian Alps

From the beginning of World War II bombing raids on German cities in the spring of 1942, Rosenheim was not spared. In November 1943 there were shelters for only 650 people for a population of approximately 22,000. However, by February 1944 shelters had been built for about 6400 people and in conjunction with other shelters a total of 10,525 people could be protected.

During 14 bomb attacks, 201 people were killed and 179 injured. The focus of the air attacks was the railway station and the railway tracks, as Rosenheim was an important transportation hub between Munich, Salzburg and Innsbruck. The neighbouring communities of Ziegelberg, Stephanskirchen, Westerndorf St. Peter and Oberpfaffenhofen were also hit. The first air attack was on 20 October 1944 at lunch time from 12:47 to 13:17, with over a hundred aircraft dropping ~1,000 bombs, leaving 27 dead and 59 wounded. The heaviest air raid took place on 18 April 1945. From 14:40 to 14:55, around 200 aircraft dropped around 1300 bombs in the area around the station, resulting in 53 dead and 36 injured. This attack also made 800 people homeless. The station building was almost completely destroyed and a total length of 20 kilometres of railway tracks were destroyed. The last air attacks were made on 19 and 21 April 1945. During the war the majority of at least 173 unexploded bombs were recovered. In 1964, the Oberbayerisches Volksblatt reported that the approximate location of 38 undiscovered unexploded ordnance was known.

=== Historical timeline ===
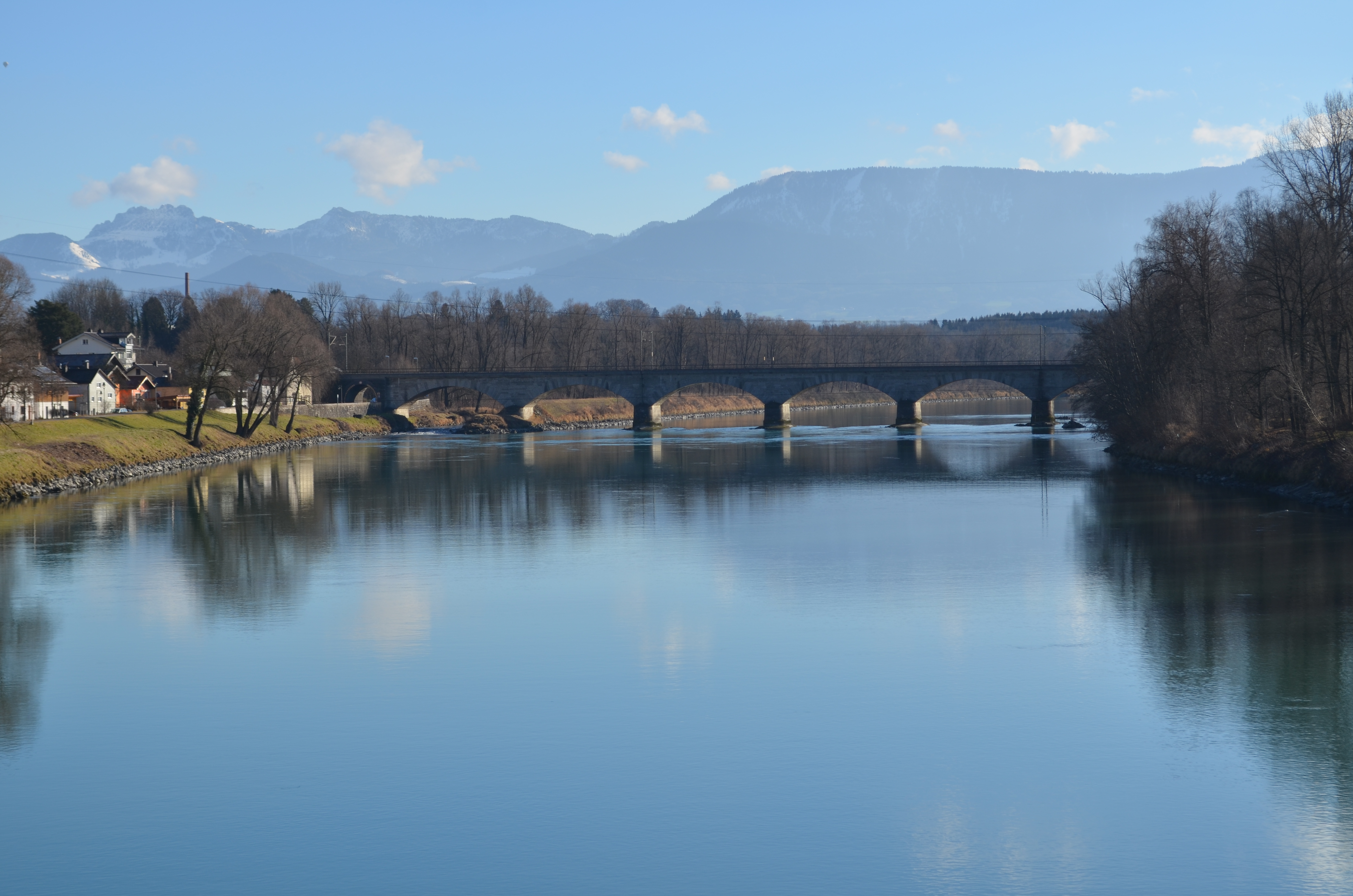
Railway bridge (Munich – Salzburg line) crossing the river Inn

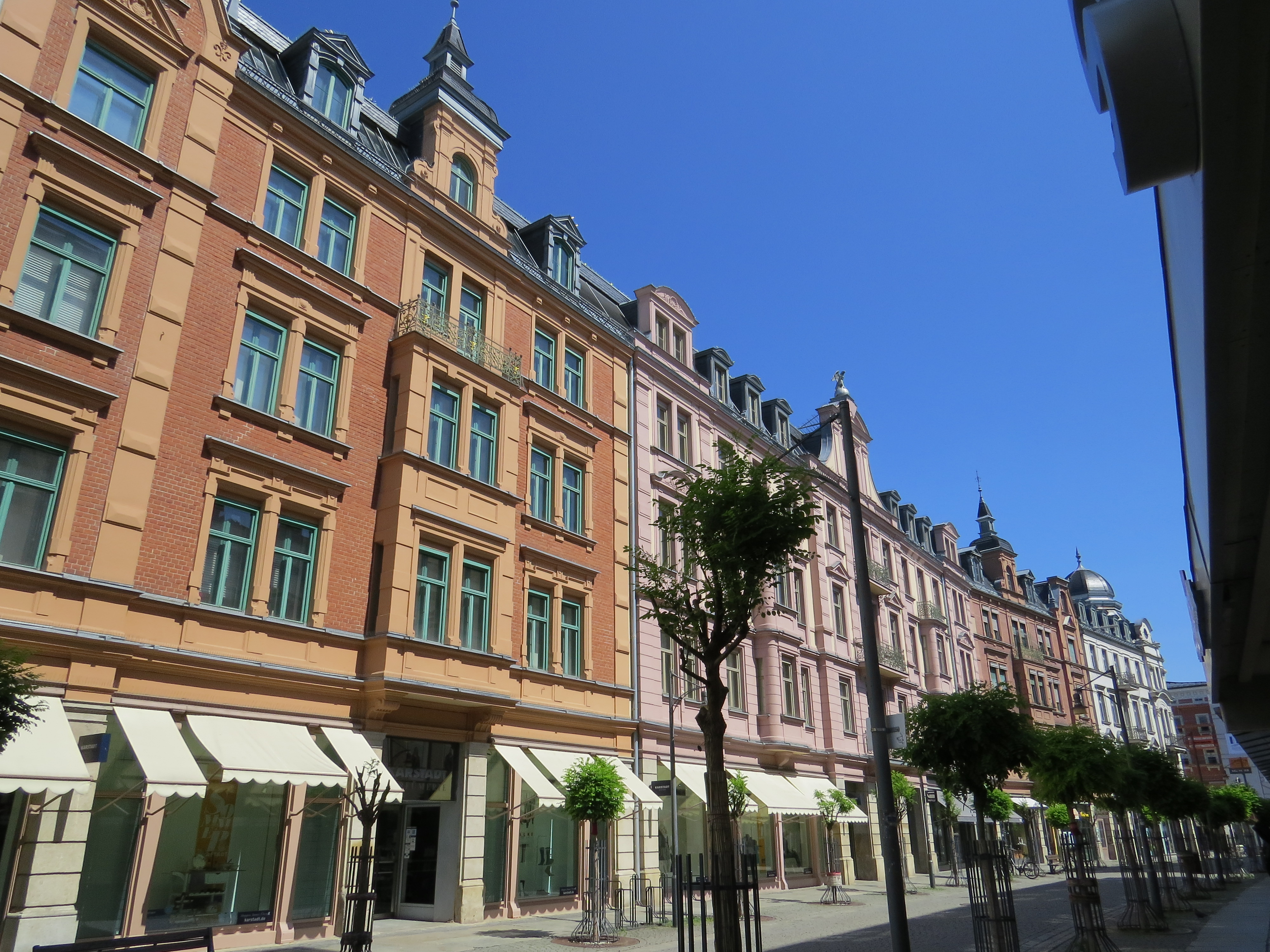
Pedestrian zone Münchener Str. with Gillitzerblock

15AD	Forerunner of Rosenheim: Roman Military station Pons Aeni (Bridge, cemetery, pottery)
1234	First record of "Schloss Rosenheim"
1276	First record of the Bridge over the Inn and salt transport
1328	Rosenheim gets market status
1602	First market regulations
1641	The great fire of 1641
1700	Founding of a bath
1810	Roxal brine salt works founded
1811	First suspension bridge over the Inn
1864	Market Rosenheim becomes a town
1870	Rosenheim obtains town status
1925	Founding of the Holztechnikum Rosenheim
1971	Founding of the Fachhochschule
1982	Opening of the city hall (today the Kultur- und Kongresszentrum Rosenheim KU'KO (Culture and Congress Centre))
1984	Opening of the pedestrian zone
1988	Opening of the exhibition centre Lokschuppen
2006	Renovation of the church Nikolauskirche
2007	Rebuilding of the square Ludwigplatz
2010	Regional garden festival in Rosenheim

=== Population growth ===
Population growth in Rosenheim since 1840

Population growth
Year	Population	Remarks
1808	1,600	
1815	2,240	
1824	1,937	454 Families, 234 Houses, counted in the administrative year 1823/24 of the Isar region
1840	3,100	
1855	3,100	
1861	4,140	
1871	5,779	in 646 residential buildings, 5,584 Catholics, 193 Protestants, 1 Continental Reformed churchgoer and one Jew
1875	7,501	
1880	8,397	
1900	14,246	comprising 772 Protestants, 13,421 Catholics
1905	15,403	mostly Catholic inhabitants, 800 Protestant and 45 Jews
1910	15,969	comprising 690 Protestants, 15,202 Catholics, 56 Jews and 22 others
1925	17,998	comprising 947 Protestants, 16,937 Catholics, 30 other Christians and 39 Jews
1933	19,060	comprising 1,146 Protestants, 17,790 Catholics, 4 other Christians and 38 Jews
1939	20,692	comprising 1,430 Protestants, 18,742 Catholics, 45 other Christians and 7 Jews
1946	27,979	in June, population increase due to refugees from eastern Europe following the end of World War II
1949	30,510	
1950	29,937	
1960	31,100	including 7,200 refugees from eastern Europe
1970	46,018	
1988	54,304	
2010	61,299	31 December
2011	59,329	9 May census
2018	63,324	Increase of 16.6% since 1988

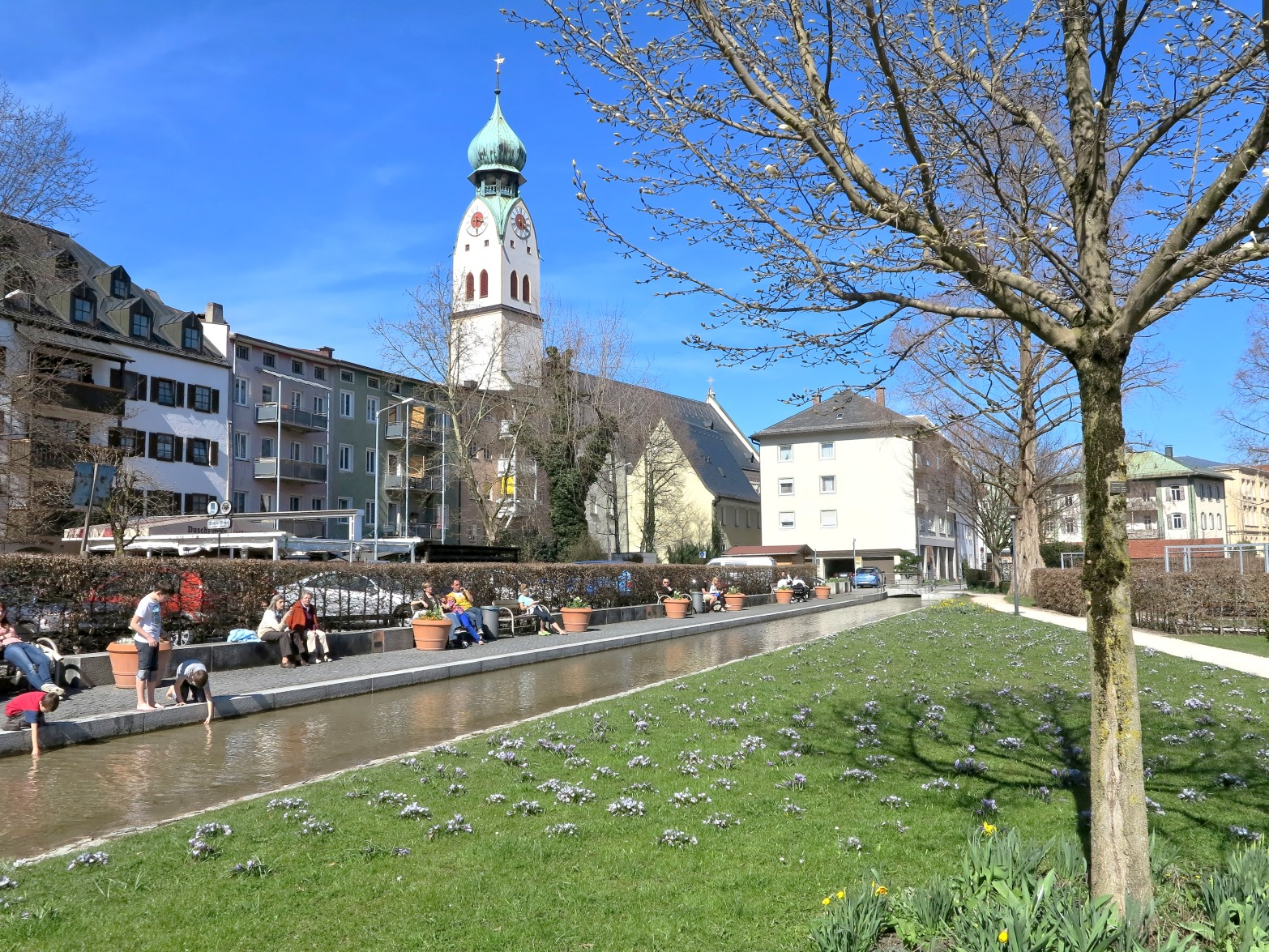
Riedergarten

=== Coat of arms ===

Rosenheim's coat of arms depicts a white rose on a red background. This design first appeared in 1374 and may be a derivation of the former arms of the Counts of Wasserburg am Inn which also contained a white rose on a red background, as Wasserburg ruled Rosenheim until 1247.

The city of Rosenheim's logo shows that same rose from the coat of arms.

== Landmarks and culture ==
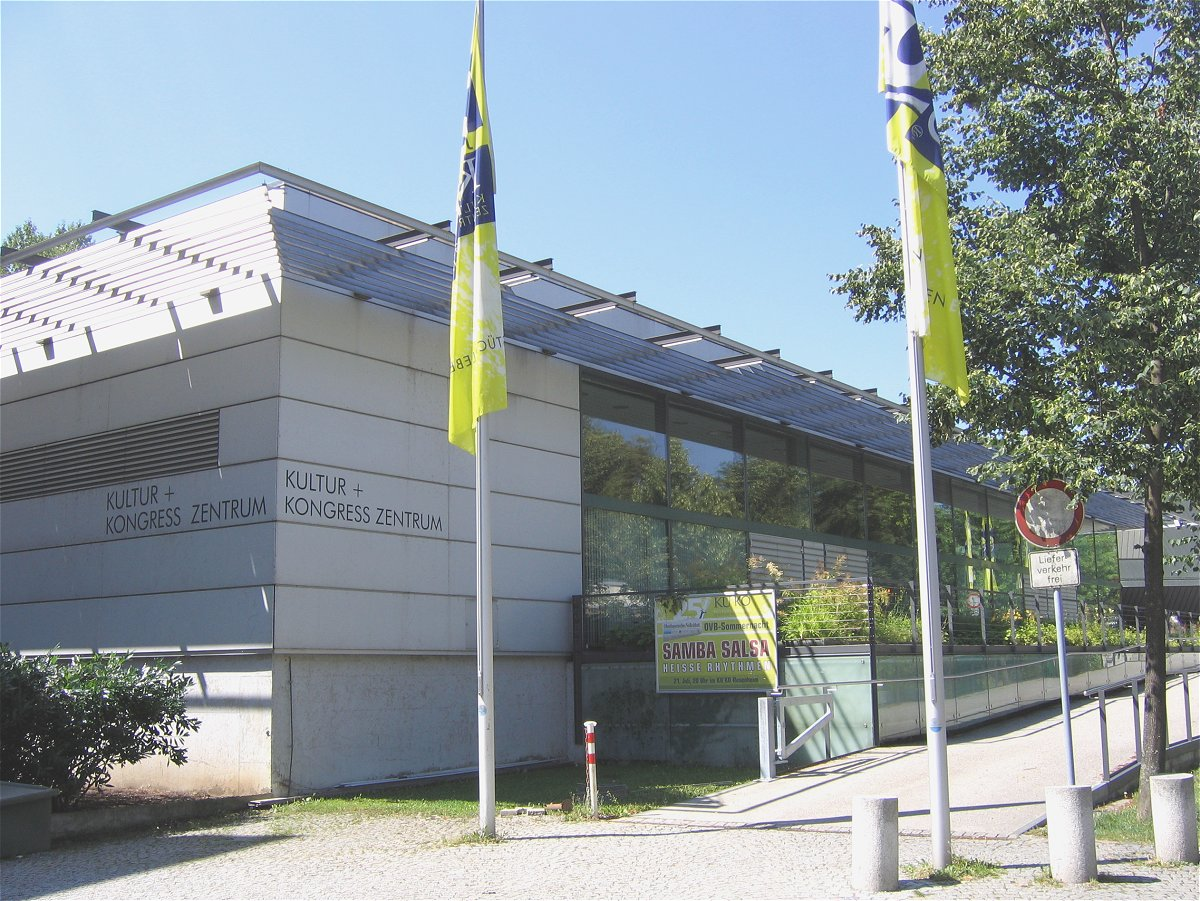
Kultur- und Kongress-Zentrum

=== Theatre ===
The Kultur- und Kongresszentrum Rosenheim (KU'KO) (Culture and Congress Centre) was built on the site of the brine works, demolished in 1967. Inaugurated on 2 October 1982 as the city hall, now the Rosenheim Culture and Congress Centre has evolved over the years into a national event centre. Today in the 3000-square-meter multipurpose building approximately 400 events are held annually.

=== Museums ===
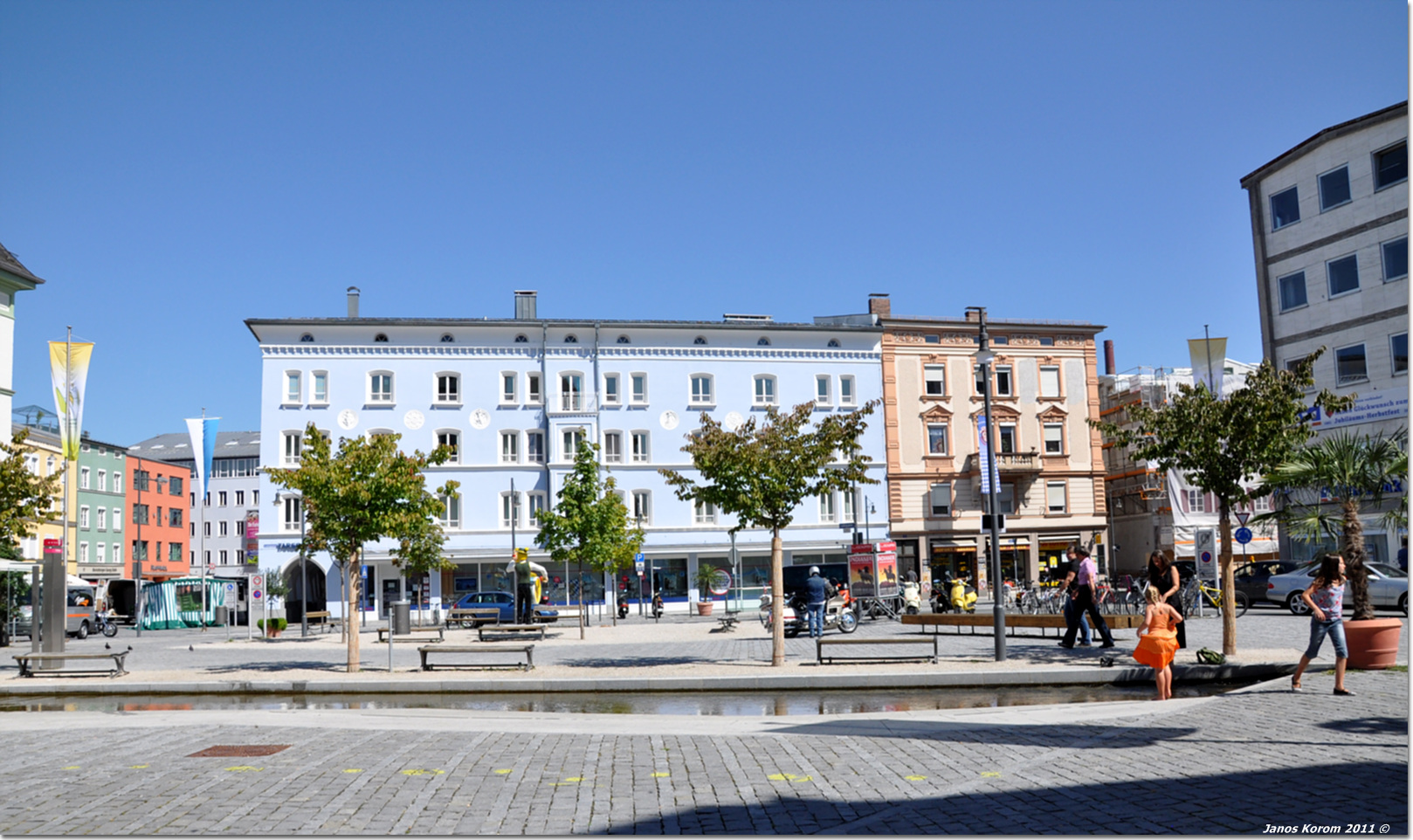
Ludwigsplatz

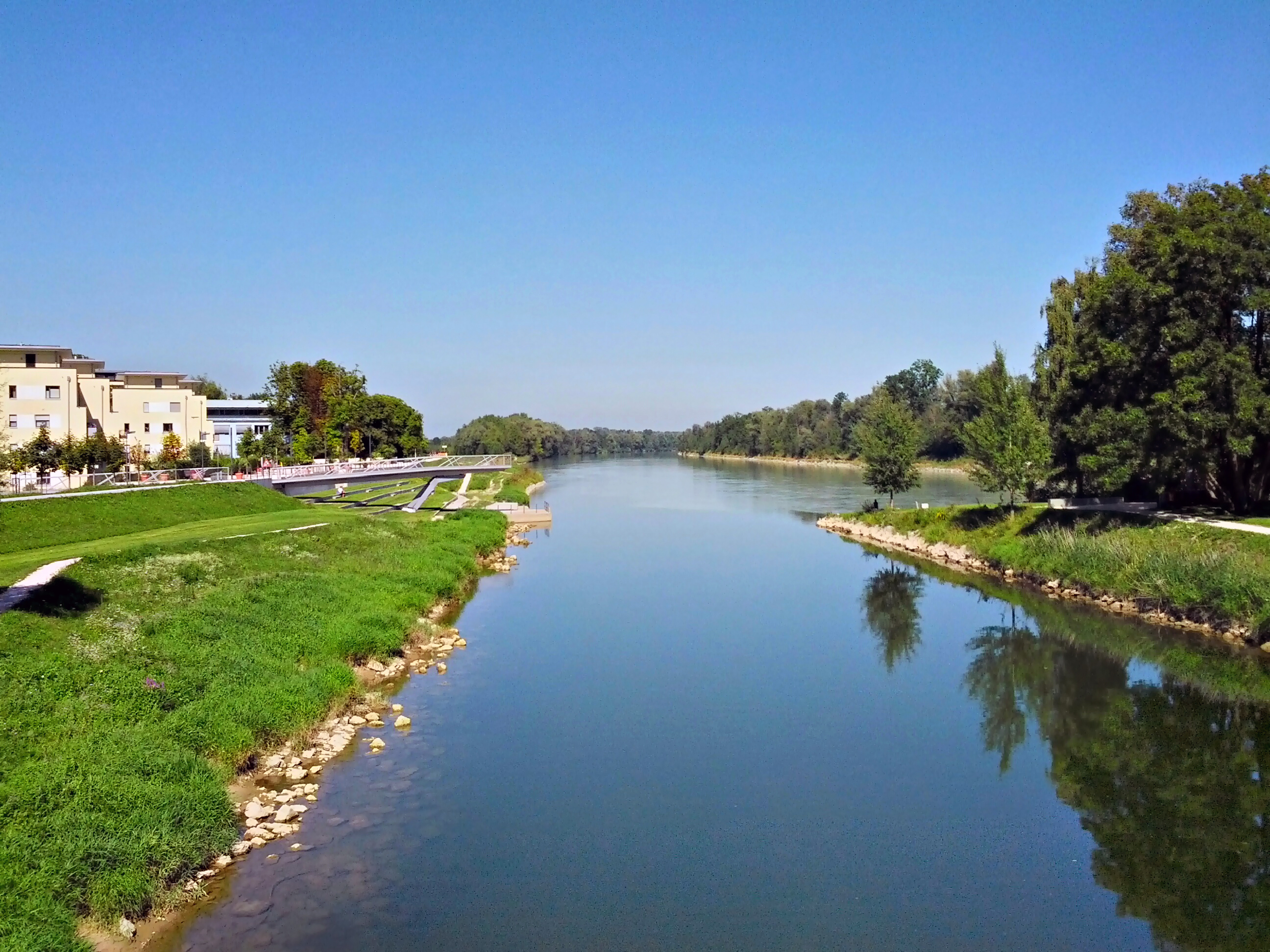
Confluence of the river Mangfall and the river Inn

Since 1885, the Mittertor has housed the Municipal Museum with a large collection (about 5000 exhibits) of the cultural history of the city and district of Rosenheim, from the prehistory and early history and Roman times to the recent city history in the 20th century. It is one of the most important regional history collections in South East Upper Bavaria.

The Inn Museum houses the hydraulic engineering and marine technology collection of the Rosenheim Water Management Office and is located in the historic river master's Bruckbaustadel at the Inn Bridge. With many original objects, the museum displays the Inn Shipping Company, the source of Rosenheim's prosperity in the Middle Ages, in the past centuries. In addition, the museum provides facts about the river landscape and river engineering, geology, settlement history, marine engineering, bridge design and the development of waterways.

The Wood technology Museum was established in 1990 in the listed Ellmaierhaus. It is housed on the first floor, which is accessed via the so-called Jacob's ladder. With over 400 square meters of exhibition space, this museum displays wood as a raw material, its importance and processing past and present, which is closely related to the timber town of Rosenheim and its training centres for wood occupations. The exhibition shows not only the end products, but also their production and the necessary tools. Regular special exhibitions complete the offer of the Wood technology Museum.

The Municipal Gallery of 1935–1937 was built by German Bestelmeyer. Every year, six art exhibitions are held here. In addition to contemporary art, also exhibitions of works from the 19th and 20th century are held. A thematic focus is the art from the region and the Munich School.

The Lokschuppen is an exhibition centre with annually changing exhibitions in the former railway locomotive round house.

The brine pump house is one of the few monuments in the city which recall time from 1810 to 1958 of Rosenheim's brine industry. As part of the National Exposition salt makes history, the city renovated the historic listed building and set up an exhibition room about Rosenheim's brine history. Admission is only possible with city guides or by agreement with the Metropolitan Museum.

The Klepper museum houses various exhibits, on the one hand the history of the Klepper folding boat, coats and tents. On the other hand, it is also dedicated to the development of the company Klepper, who was once the biggest employer in Rosenheim.

=== Architecture ===
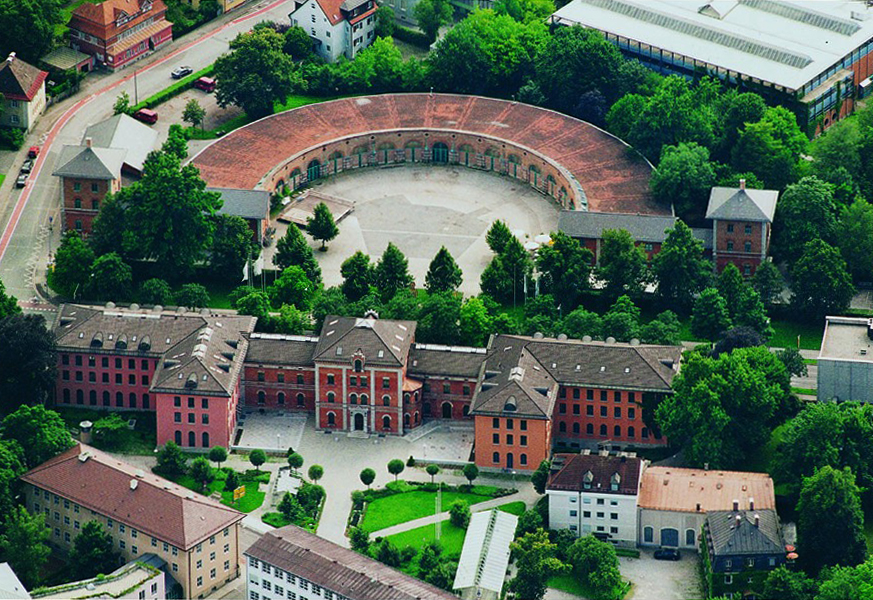
City hall (old railway station) with the "Lokschuppen" (old engine shed) in the background

The Mittertor (the sole survivor of five market gates) was the eastern gate of the market town before 1350, which was then protected with a double ditch. Since the 15th century, it separated the interior from the exterior of the market town and served as a customs office. Until the 19th century it also contained several municipal facilities such as the city clerk's office. After the great fire in 1641 the Rosenheim onion dome was built and later extended into a long building. At its core is the Mittertor, the oldest building in the city. On the façade facing the square is the emblem of Louis Rosenheim, with the white rose against a red background. The Bavarian crest can also be seen here.

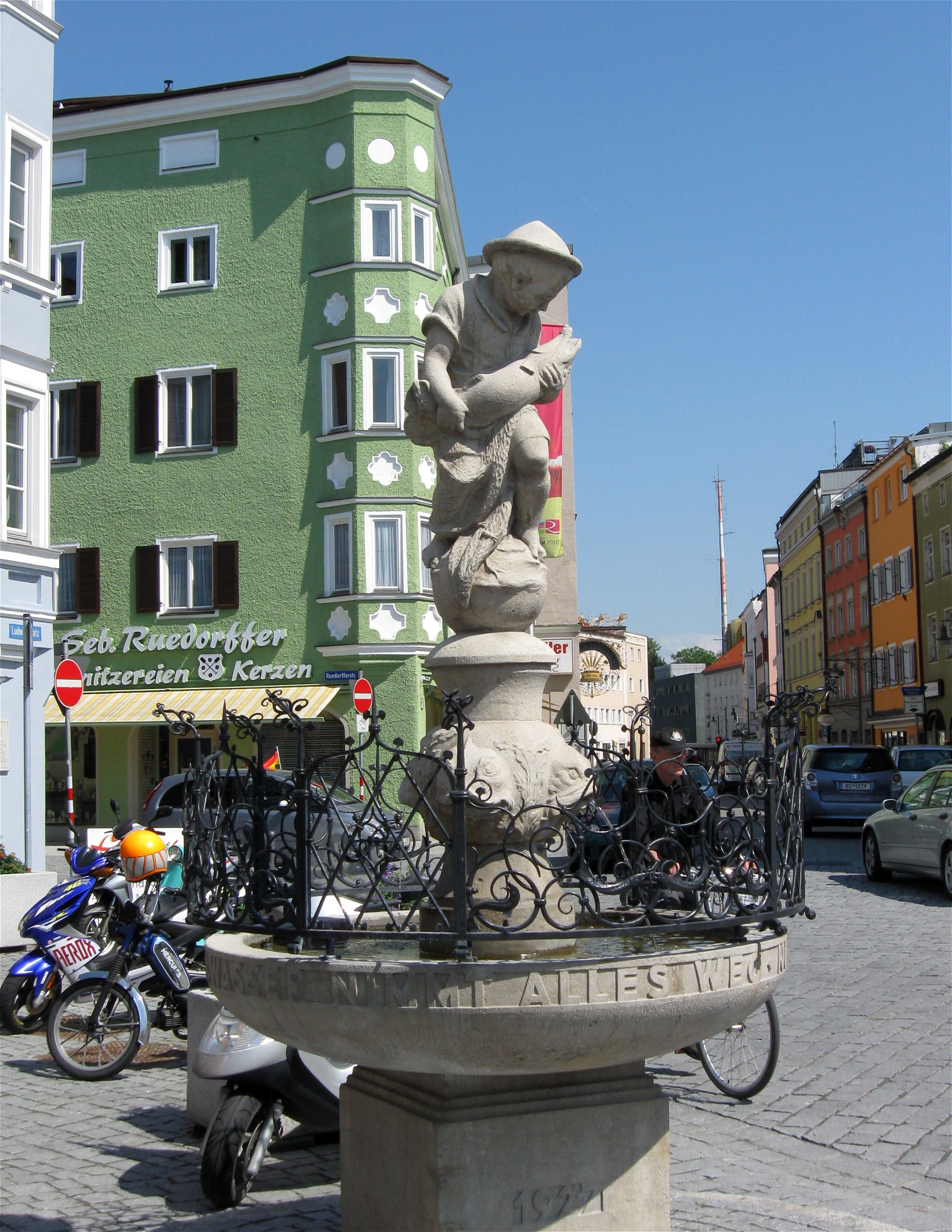
Ludwigsplatz

The street Münchener Strasse follows the Gillitzerblock, that is also called "small pedestrian zone." Immediately apparent are the magnificently restored Gründerzeit fronts. The name Gillitzerblock come from its builder Thomas Gillitzer. At the end of the 19th century he obtained a relatively large area of land for its day, and built 15 houses, including the Hotel Deutscher Kaiser. Since the 1960s, the once solely Gründerzeit ensemble has been altered with new construction and renovations. Only the façades in Münchener Strasse have been preserved and restored to the original.

The Quest-Kunstmühle was built from 1855 to 1916 in several phases as industrial complexes. Kunstmühle was at these times the name for technically advanced mills which were generally not powered by water or wind – German Kunst meaning art, therefore implying artificially powered in English (Steam, Diesel, etc.). The mill was renovated in the 1990s and now serves as a restaurant and office space. The Quest-Kunstmühle Power station is located on the Mangfallkanal. The former mill houses the exhibition halls of the Rosenheim arts club. The approximately 200-square-metre (2,153 sq ft) upper floor holds exhibitions of contemporary artists, exchange exhibitions with other art associations and activities accompanying the exhibition.

The Rosenheim ballroom was built in the former Rosenheim Hofbräus buildings. The hall with ballroom and vaulted cellar was built in 1878. It was renovated in 1994 and since 2001 has been used as an event space, with its many possible uses of the centre of the eastern city of Rosenheim.

The city's landmark is the gothic spire (65 m (213 ft)) of the parish church St. Nikolaus (1,450 m (4,757 ft)) with its baroque onion dome (1,641 m (5,384 ft)).

Sculptures in the Salingarten
Name	Sculptor
Wasserrad	Josef Hamberger
Stehende	Rolf Märkl
Liegende	Marianne Lüdicke
Mensch und Pferd	Prof. Heinrich Kirchner
Norne	Louise Stomps
Passantengruppe	Erika Maria Lankes
Stele	Alfred Regnat

=== Parks ===
The Kunstwiese shows three-dimensional contemporary art works by artists from Rosenheim all year round.

The Riedergarten was created in 1729 as a private herb garden by Rosenheim pharmacist Johann Rieder. It was sold to the town in 1925 by physician Herman Rieder for use as a summer garden. In 2002 the garden was redesigned by the opening up of a previously culverted stream, adding a modern character.

Since 1987, the Salingarten, in front of the Culture and Congress Centre Ku'Ko, has been used as a sculpture garden. Large sculptures by important sculptors from Rosenheim and environment can be seen here.

== Transport ==
There are regular regional train connections to Munich and Salzburg. Rosenheim is also connected to the EuroCity network. The nearest airports are Munich Airport and Salzburg Airport.

== Twin towns – sister cities ==
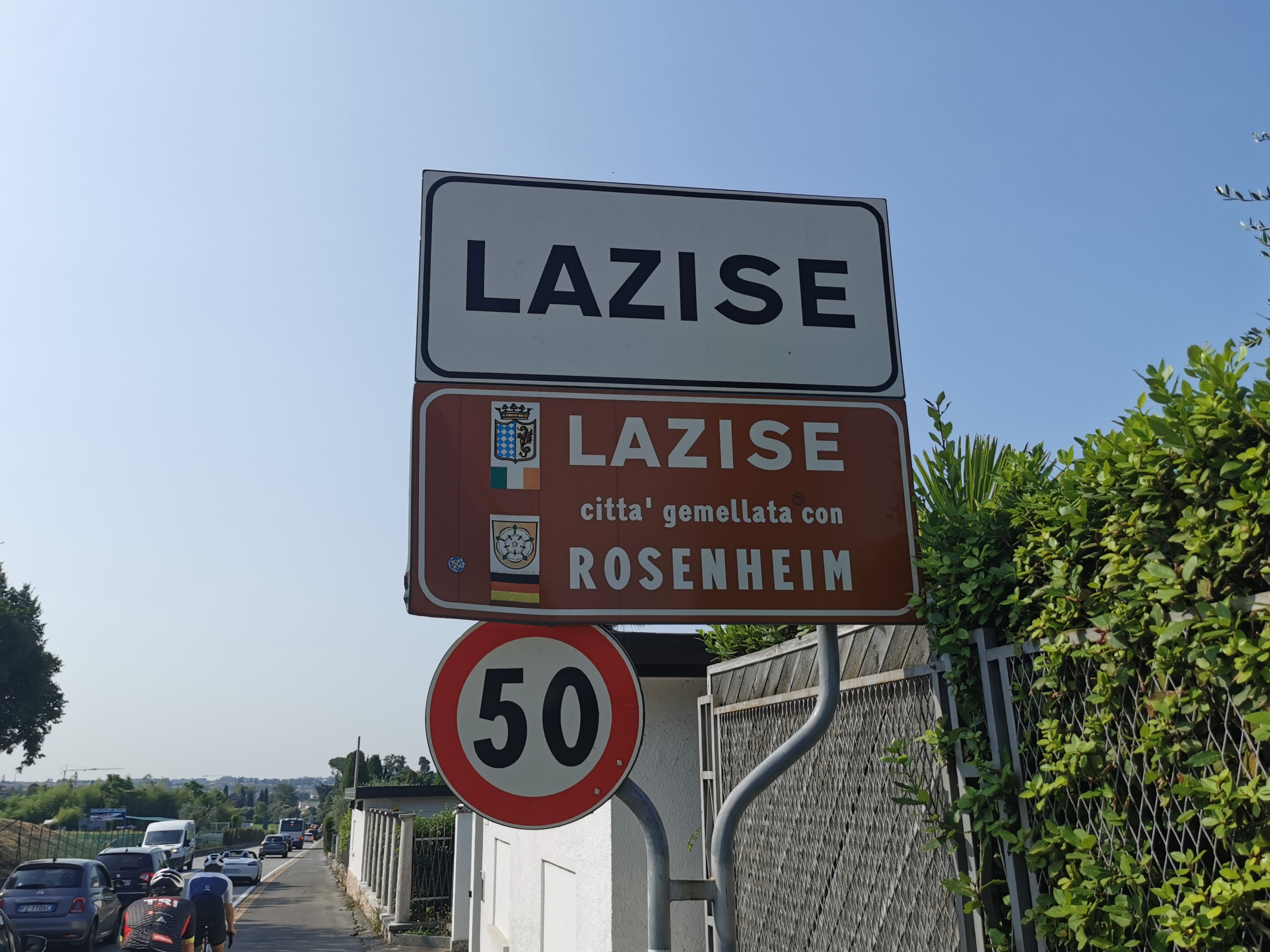
Sign in Lazise

Rosenheim is twinned with:

- Lazise, Italy (1974)
- Briançon, France (1979)
- Ichikawa, Japan (2004)

== Sports ==
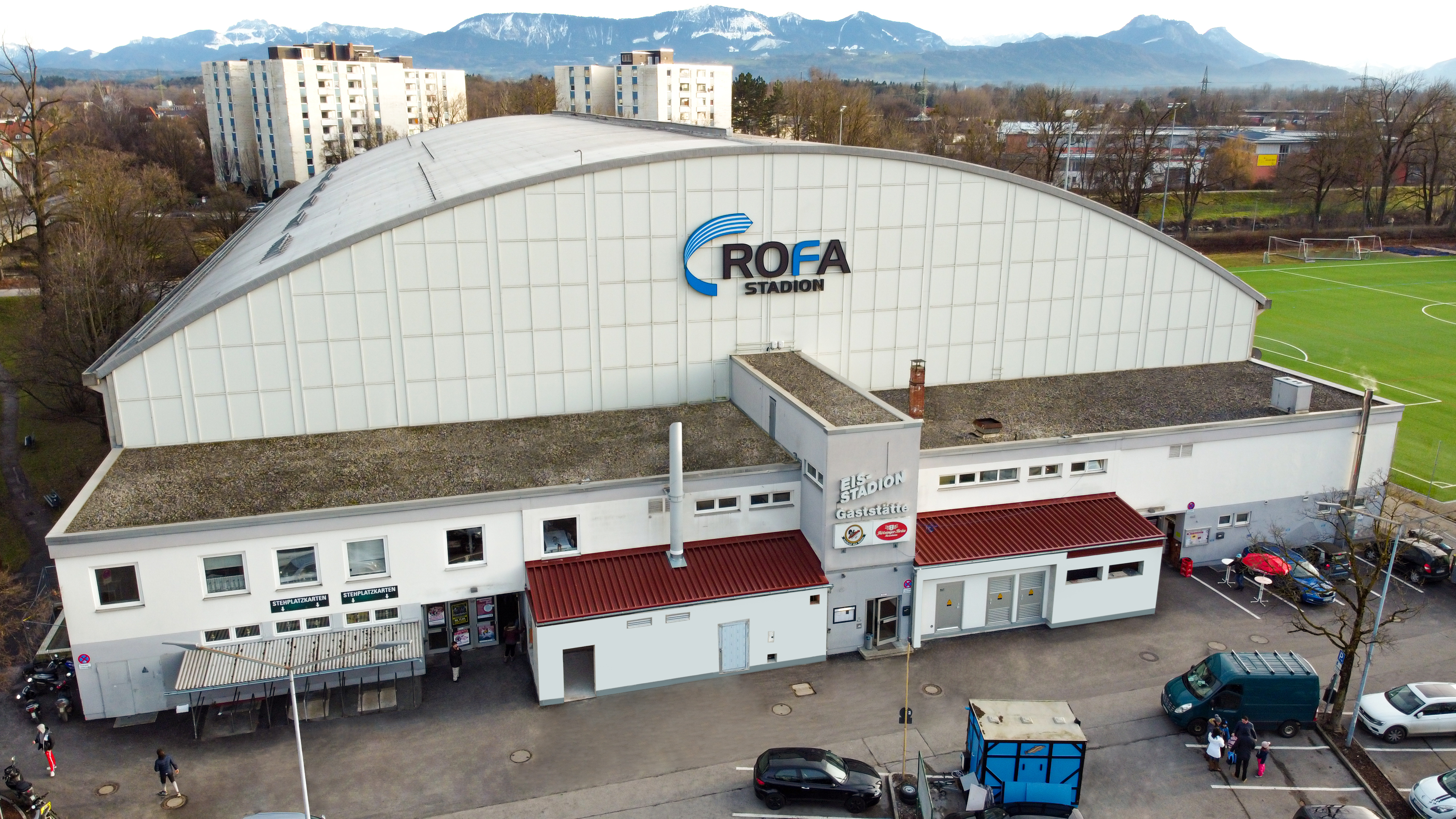
Ice hockey stadium ROFA-Stadion

=== Ice hockey ===
Starbulls Rosenheim is the local ice hockey club, currently playing in the DEL2, Germany's second highest professional league. Their former team, the Sportbund Rosenheim, won the German championship three times (1982, 1985, 1989).

=== Football ===
TSV 1860 Rosenheim and Sportbund Rosenheim are the local football clubs, currently playing in Germany's sixth and ninth highest league, respectively.

== Notable people ==
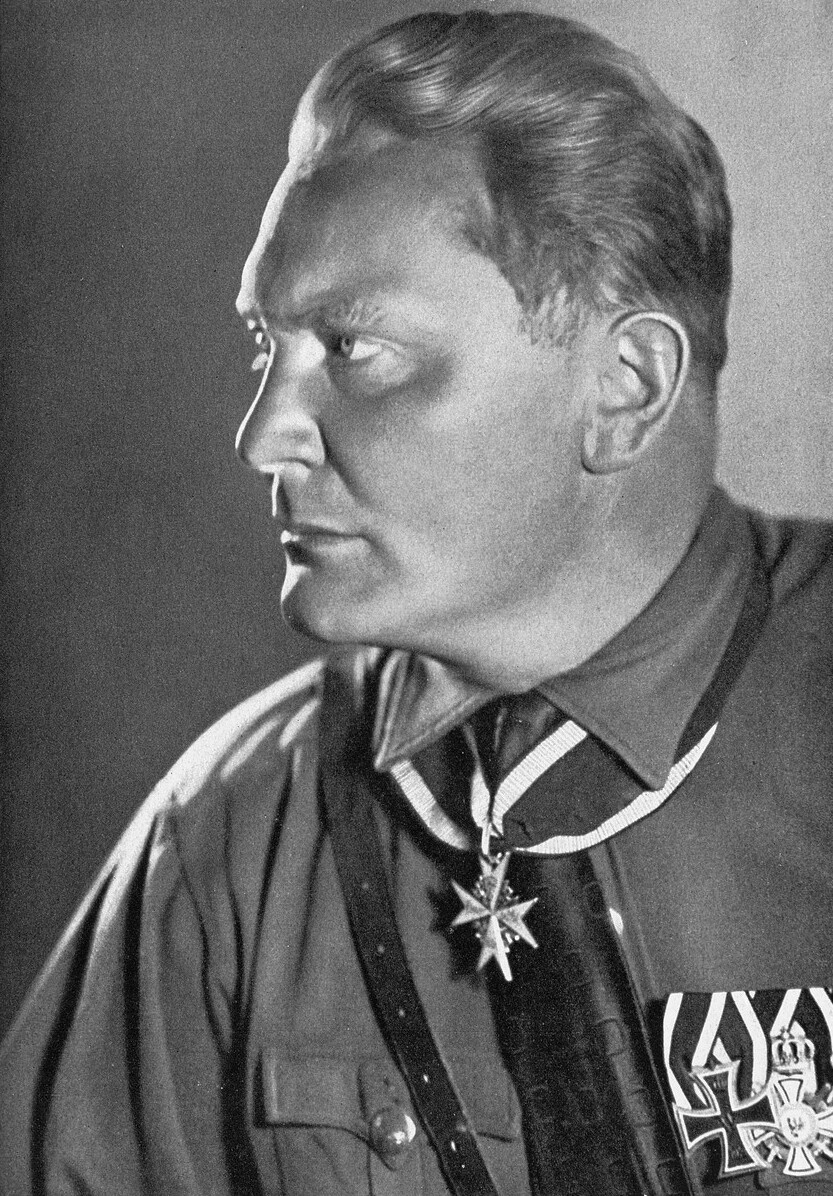
Hermann Göring

- Hermann Göring (1893–1946), Nazi political and military leader and convicted war criminal
- Hans-Ulrich Rudel (1916–1982), World War II pilot, lived and died here
- Edmund Stoiber (born 1941), politician (CSU) and jurist, former Minister President of Bavaria
- Ray Manzarek (1939–2013), American musician, member of The Doors, died here
- Siegfried Fischbacher (1939–2021), magician and entertainer
- Günther Maria Halmer (1943–2026), actor
- George Dzundza (born 1945), actor
- Jupp Kapellmann (born 1949), footballer
- Hannes Zehentner (born 1965), alpine skier
- Mark Benecke (born 1970), biologist
- Mario Jann (born 1980), professional ice hockey player
- Martin Tomczyk (born 1981), racing driver
- Tobias Schweinsteiger (born 1982), footballer
- Danijel Kovacic (born 1987), professional ice hockey player
- Nadine Samonte (born 1988), actress
- Lars Bender (born 1989), footballer
- Sven Bender (born 1989), footballer
- Philipp Grubauer (born 1991), ice hockey player

== See also ==
- Out of Rosenheim
- Rosenheim poltergeist claim
- Starbulls Rosenheim
