= Danijela Veselinović =

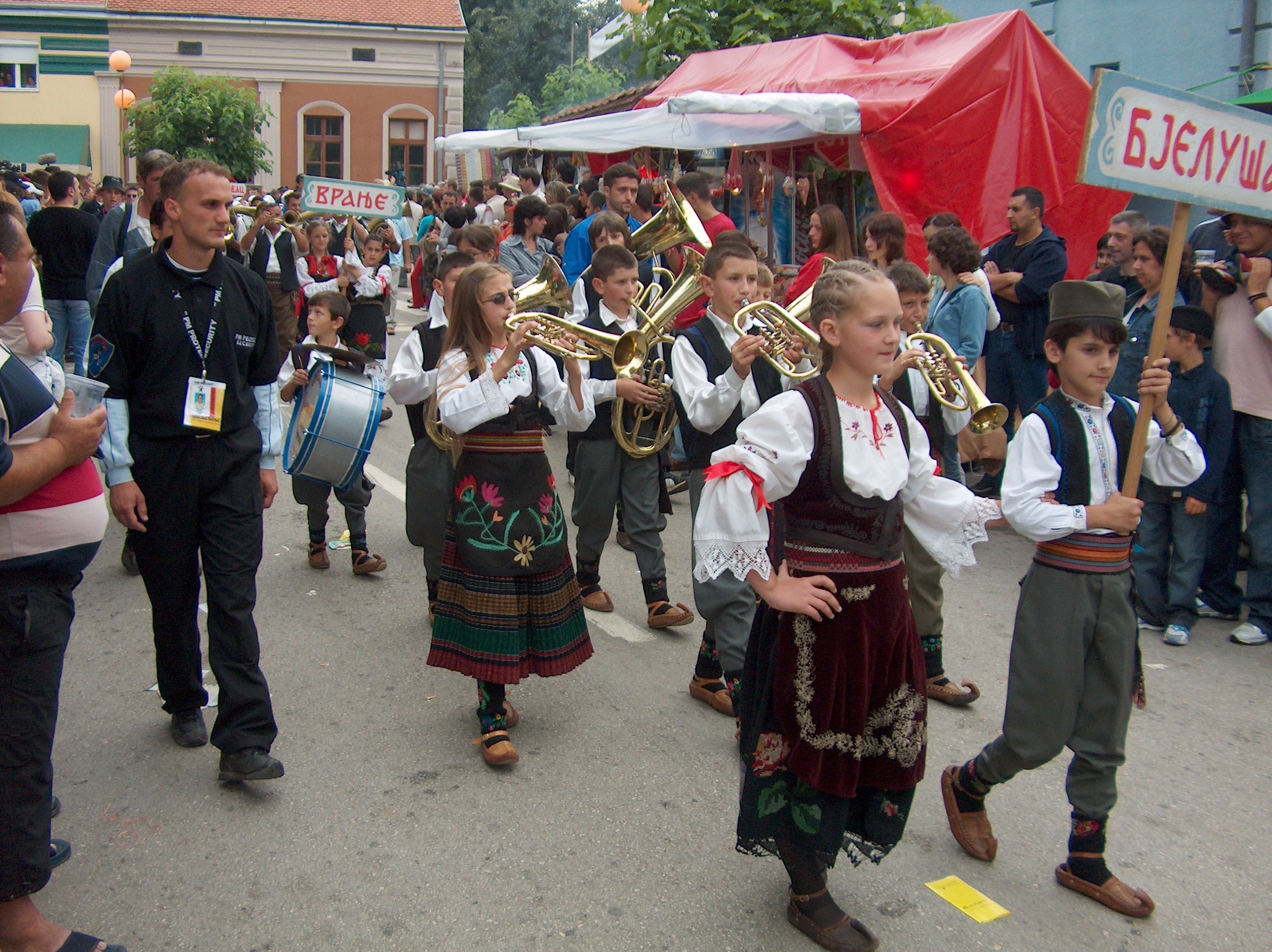

Background information
- Born: August, 1993
- Origin: Bjeluša, Arilje, Serbia
- Genres: Serbian folk
- Instrument: trumpet
- Years active: 2003-present

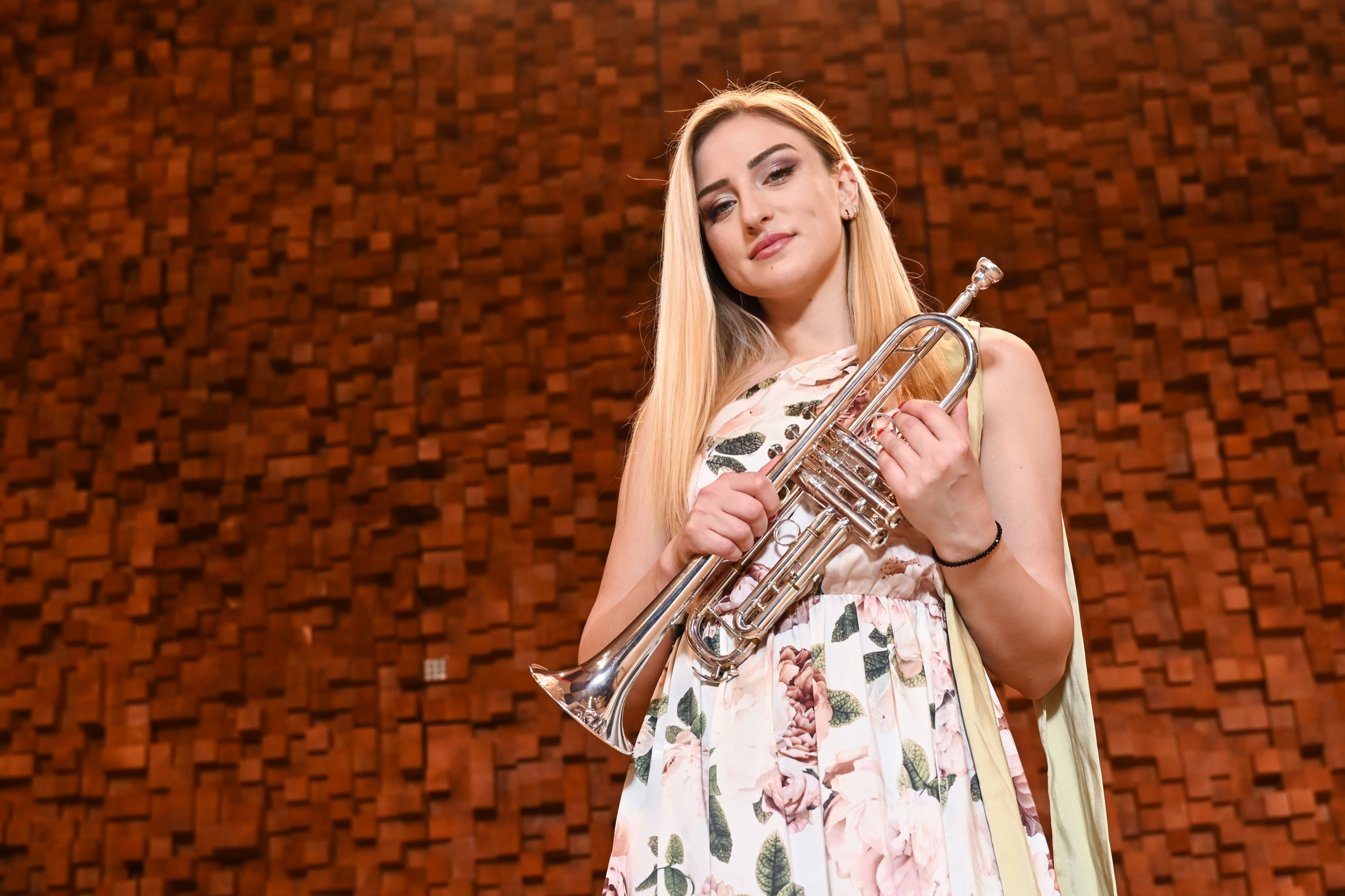
Danijela Veselinović

Danijela Veselinović is a Serbian trumpet player and brass ensemble leader from Arilje, dubbed the "Trumpet Princess" by Boban Marković. She and her brass band have represented Serbia across Europe.

== Orkestar Danijela ==
Danijela was first exposed to trumpet playing in Zlatibor and at age 8 and started playing a trumpet her father repaired. Her first band "Danijela with her Brothers" formed with her brothers Slobodan, Bogdan, and Bojan (aged 6 to 10) on trumpet, tenor horn, and drum, plus four cousins. The band competed at the Guča Trumpet Festival from its formation in 2003 until 2014. At the first festival, Boban Marković gave her a trumpet saying, "You are a little trumpet princess." At the 2016 festival, she played a featured performance with Boban and Marko Marković. In addition to Balkan music, she received the diploma from the Academy of Arts, Novi Sad University in classical music in 2016. She is also a competitive rifle shooter.

The band has played festivals and concerts in Poland, Greece, and Switzerland. Danijela and her band have been the subject of several television documentaries.
