= Danijela Cabric =

American electrical engineer

- Education: University of Belgrade; University of California, Los Angeles; University of California, Berkeley
- Scientific career
- Fields: Electrical engineering
- Institutions: UCLA Henry Samueli School of Engineering and Applied Science
- Thesis: Cognitive radios: system design perspective (2007)
- Doctoral advisor: Robert W. Brodersen
- Website: cores.ee.ucla.edu

Danijela Branislav Cabric is a Serbian-American electrical engineer. She is a professor in the Department of Electrical and Computer Engineering at the University of California, Los Angeles. In 2021, Cabric was elected a Fellow of the Institute of Electrical and Electronics Engineers (IEEE) for her "contributions to theory and practice of spectrum sensing and cognitive radio systems."

== Early life and education ==
Cabric received her diploma in engineering from the University of Belgrade in 1998. She completed her master's degree in electrical engineering at the University of California, Los Angeles, in 2001 and her Ph.D. in the same subject from the University of California, Berkeley, in 2007. As a graduate student, Cabric's first project was to design a high-speed frequency-hopping system, which resulted in the fastest frequency-hopping system ever built.

== Career ==
Upon completing her formal education, Cabric accepted a faculty position at the UCLA Henry Samueli School of Engineering and Applied Science as an assistant professor in 2007. In this role, she continued her research into physical and network layer design for cognitive radios for opportunistic spectrum sharing; cognitive radio algorithms and architectures for spectrum sensing; adaptive transmission and spatial processing; and the development of wireless testbeds to support physical and network experiments. Her work was recognized by the Intelligence Advanced Research Projects Activity (IARPA) and she was the recipient of a $500,000 seed contract to improve the safety of large-scale information systems. Cabric was also recognized for her efforts with the National Science Foundation (NSF) CAREER Award.

Throughout her tenure at UCLA, Cabric has led the Cognitive Reconfigurable Embedded Systems (CORES) research laboratory that focuses on the "theoretical modeling, algorithmic development, system implementation and experimental validation of the emerging wireless technologies including 5G millimeter-wave communications, distributed communications and sensing for Internet of Things, and machine learning for wireless networks co-existence and security." As a result of her efforts, Cabric appeared in the 2017 documentary Bombshell: The Hedy Lamarr Story. In 2018, she was selected to serve as an Institute of Electrical and Electronics Engineers (IEEE) ComSoc Distinguished Lecturer and later received their Best Paper Award.

In 2020, Cabric and two of her graduate students received the Best Paper Award for their paper mRAPID: Machine Learning Assisted Noncoherent Compressive Millimeter-Wave Beam Alignment at 4th ACM Workshop on Millimeter-Wave Networks and Sensing Systems. She was also the recipient of the 2020 Qualcomm Faculty Award. In 2021, Cabric was elected a Fellow of the IEEE for her "contributions to theory and practice of spectrum sensing and cognitive radio systems."
