= Dalibor Gatarić =

Bosnia and Herzegovina footballer (born 1986)

Personal information
- Date of birth: 18 May 1986 (age 40)
- Place of birth: Banja Luka, SR Bosnia and Herzegovina, SFR Yugoslavia
- Height: 1.80 m (5 ft 11 in)
- Position: Midfielder

Youth career
- 1997–2000: MSV Duisburg
- 2000–2005: Rot-Weiß Oberhausen

Senior career*
Years	Team	Apps	(Gls)
2004–2006	Rot-Weiß Oberhausen	21	(0)
2006–2008	1. FC Köln II	44	(2)
2008–2009	FSV Oggersheim	32	(3)
2009	Wormatia Worms	12	(0)
2010–2014	Sportfreunde Lotte	80	(13)
2014–2016	Wuppertaler SV	43	(8)
2016–2017	Hammer SpVg	30	(1)
2017–2022	TV Jahn Hiesfeld		
- * Club domestic league appearances and goals

Dalibor Gatarić (born 18 May 1986) is a Bosnian-Herzegovinian and German former footballer who played as a midfielder.

== Career ==
Gatarić was born in Modriča. He played three games in the 2. Bundesliga for Rot-Weiß Oberhausen during the 2004–05 season. He later played for several Regionalliga and Oberliga sides.

== Personal life ==
His twin brother Danijel, also a former footballer, played alongside him at Hammer SpVg.
