= Danijela Stojadinović =

Serbian politician

Danijela Stojadinović (Serbian Cyrillic: Данијела Стојановић; born 1969) is a politician in Serbia. She has served in the National Assembly of Serbia since 2016 as a member of the Socialist Party of Serbia.

== Private career ==
Stojadinović is a specialist in clinical biochemistry. She lives in Svilajnac.

== Political career ==
Stojadinović has been a municipal politician in Svilajnac, at one time serving as deputy mayor of the municipality.

She received the 224th position on the Socialist Party's electoral list in the 2007 Serbian parliamentary election and that 227th position on a Socialist-led coalition list in the 2008 election. The lists won sixteen and twenty seats, respectively, and she was not included in her party's assembly delegation on either occasion. (Between 2000 and 2011, Serbian parliamentary mandates were awarded to sponsoring parties or coalitions rather than to individual candidates, and it was common practice for mandates to be awarded out of numerical order. Stojadinović's low positions on these lists – which were in any event mostly arranged in alphabetical order – did not automatically prevent her from receiving a mandate in either election, though ultimately this did not happen).

Serbia's electoral system was reformed in 2011, such that parliamentary mandates were awarded in numerical order to candidates on successful lists. Stojadinović received the ninety-fifth position on the Socialist-led list in the 2012 election and the 153rd position in the 2014 election. The Socialist Party's alliance won forty-four seats each time, and she was not elected.

She was promoted to the twenty-fourth position in the 2016 election and was this time elected when the Socialist-led alliance won twenty-nine seats. The Socialist Party is part of a coalition government led by the Serbian Progressive Party, and Stojadinović serves as part of the government's parliamentary majority. She is a member of the assembly's health and family committee and the committee on the rights of the child; a deputy member of four committees (the committee on the judiciary, public administration, and local self-government; the committee on the diaspora and Serbs in the region; the committee on spatial planning, transport, infrastructure, and telecommunications; and the culture and information committee); a member of a commission "to Investigate the Consequences of the North Atlantic Treaty Organization (NATO) 1999 Bombing on the Health of the Citizens of Serbia, as well as the Environment, with a Special Focus on the Impact of the Depleted Uranium Projectiles"; and a member of the parliamentary friendship groups with Belarus, Kazakhstan, Malta, Montenegro, Slovenia, and the United Kingdom. In March 2018, she took part in a Serbian delegation monitoring the 2018 Russian presidential election.
