= Danijel Kovacic =

German ice hockey player

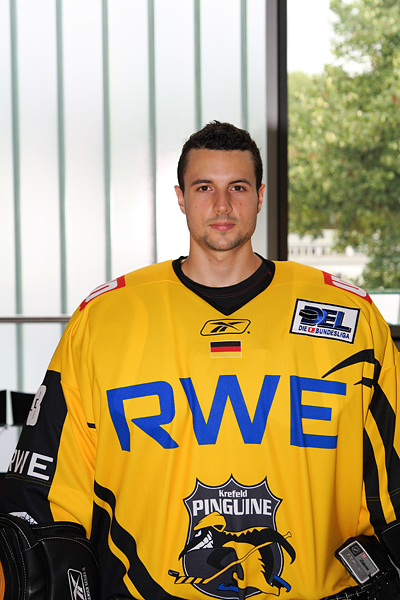
- Born: July 3, 1987 (age 38) Rosenheim, West Germany
- Height: 5 ft 8 in (173 cm)
- Weight: 157 lb (71 kg; 11 st 3 lb)
- Position: Goaltender
- Caught: Left
- DEL team: Krefeld Pinguine
- NHL draft: Undrafted
- Playing career: 2007–2015

Danijel Kovacic (born July 3, 1987) is a German former professional ice hockey goaltender.
