= Danijela Veljović =

Serbian politician

Danijela Veljović (Serbian Cyrillic: Данијела Вељовић; born 1977) is a politician in Serbia. She served in the Kragujevac municipal assembly from 2012 to 2020 and was elected to the National Assembly of Serbia in the 2020 parliamentary election. Veljović is a member of the Social Democratic Party of Serbia.

== Private career ==
Veljović has a master of laws degree and is based in Kragujevac.

== Politician ==
=== Municipal politics ===
Veljović was first elected to the Kragujevac municipal assembly in the 2012 Serbian local elections. The SDPS contested this election in an alliance with the Democratic Party; Veljović received the twelfth position on the latter's Choice for a Better Life electoral list and was elected when the list won exactly twelve mandates out of eighty-seven, finishing in third place. The SDPS subsequently aligned itself with the Serbian Progressive Party at both the republic and the local level. Veljović received the twenty-fourth position on the Progressive list in the 2016 local elections and was elected for a second term when the list won forty mandates.

She received the seventy-eighth position on the Progressive list in the 2020 local elections. This was too low a position for re-election to be a realistic prospect, and indeed she was not re-elected when the list won a majority victory with forty-six mandates. Her low position on the list was presumably due to her candidacy for the national assembly.

=== Parliamentarian ===
Veljović received the 243rd position out of 250 on the Progressive Party's Aleksandar Vučić – Serbia Is Winning electoral list in the 2016 Serbian parliamentary election. The list won a majority victory with 131 seats and she was not elected. She was promoted to the seventieth position on the successor Aleksandar Vučić — For Our Children list in the 2020 election and was elected when the list won a landslide majority with 188 mandates. She is now the deputy chair of the committee on Kosovo-Metohija; a member of the committee on the rights of the child; a deputy member of the committee on the judiciary, public administration, and local self-government; the leader of Serbia's parliamentary friendship group with Guatemala; and a member of the parliamentary friendship groups with Argentina, Austria, Ecuador, Mauritius, Morocco, Paraguay, Slovenia, the United Arab Emirates, and the United States of America.
