= Danijel Gatarić =

Bosnian-Herzegovinian footballer (born 1986)

Personal information
- Date of birth: 18 May 1986 (age 40)
- Place of birth: Banja Luka, SFR Yugoslavia
- Height: 1.81 m (5 ft 11 in)
- Positions: Defensive midfielder; right-back

Youth career
- FC Buschhausen
- –2000: MSV Duisburg
- 2000–2005: Rot-Weiß Oberhausen

Senior career*
| Years | Team | Apps | (Gls) |
| 2005–2006 | Rot-Weiß Oberhausen | 33 | (3) |
| 2006–2008 | 1. FC Köln II | 42 | (7) |
| 2008–2009 | FSV Oggersheim | 29 | (5) |
| 2009–2010 | Wormatia Worms | 15 | (1) |
| 2010–2011 | KSV Hessen Kassel | 11 | (0) |
| 2011–2012 | Rot-Weiß Oberhausen | 24 | (0) |
| 2012–2014 | Sportfreunde Lotte | 40 | (0) |
| 2014–2016 | Wuppertaler SV | 41 | (1) |
| 2016–2017 | Hammer SpVg | 17 | (0) |
| 2017–2022 | TV Jahn Hiesfeld | | |
- * Club domestic league appearances and goals as of 13 January 2021

Danijel Gatarić (born 18 May 1986) is a Bosnian-Herzegovinian and German former footballer who plays as a defensive midfielder or right-back. He is the twin brother of Dalibor Gatarić.
