= Posthumus =

Posthumus is a surname mostly stemming from the Dutch province of Friesland. Among variants are Posthuma and Postmus. The surname may have originated in the same way Romans called boys and girls born after the death of their father Postumus and Postuma, and the common Frisian name Postma sometimes is a derivative of such a name. Alternatively, the situation is reversed, with the surname Postma or Postema morphing to "Posthuma" and further to "Posthumus". People with this surname include:

- Bryan Posthumus (born 1984), American politician, son of Dick
- Chad Posthumus (1991–2024), Canadian basketball player
- Cyril Posthumus (1918–1992), British motoring journalist
- Dick Posthumus (born 1950), American politician from Michigan
- Hans Posthumus (1947–2016), Dutch football player
- Herman Posthumus (c.1513–1599), Dutch painter and architect
- Johannes Posthumus (1887–1978), Dutch gymnast
- Kees Posthumus (1902–1972), Dutch chemist and university president
- Lisa Posthumus Lyons (born 1980), American politician from Michigan, daughter of Dick
- Nicolaas Wilhelmus Posthumus (1880–1960), Dutch economic historian and political scientist, husband of Willemijn
- Siep Posthumus (1910–1987), Dutch politician
- Sieta Posthumus (born 1936), Dutch swimmer
- Willemijn Posthumus-van der Goot (1897–1989), Dutch economist, feminist and radio broadcaster, wife of Nicolaas

== See also ==
- E.S. Posthumus, American music group composing electronic orchestral music, including "Posthumus Zone"
- Posthumus Leonatus, a character in Shakespeare's play Cymbeline
- Johannes Postmus (1877–1947), South African banker
- Posthumous
- Postumus (disambiguation)
