= The Judges House =

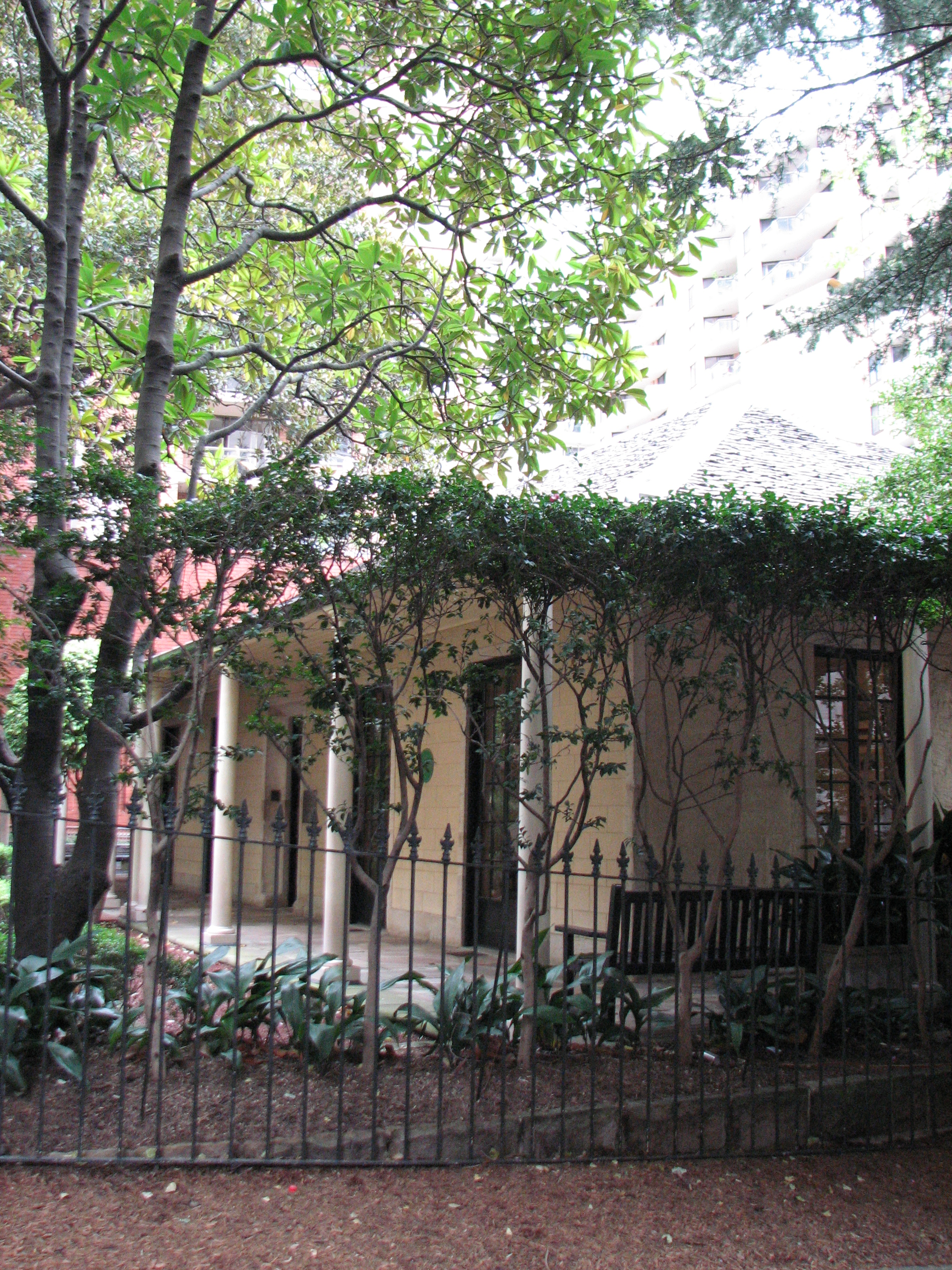
- The Judges House

- Location within Sydney Location within Australia
- 33.8752°S 151.2050°E
- Location: 529-531 Kent Street, Sydney, New South Wales, Australia

Site notes
- Architect: William Harper (attributed)
- Architectural style: Colonial Georgian

New South Wales Heritage Register
- Official name: Judges House, The; Suntory Restaurant
- Type: State heritage (built)
- Designated: 2 April 1999
- Reference no.: 60
- Type: House
- Category: Residential buildings (private)

The Judges House is a heritage-listed former gentleman's villa residence and homeless shelter and now corporates offices and restaurant located at 529 - 531 Kent Street, Sydney, New South Wales, Australia. Its design is attributed to William Harper. The property has been sub-divided. The lot on which the main structure of the Judges House stands is numbered 531, while number 529 contains the Japanese-influenced modern addition to the back of the property together with sections of the former garden. The modern addition was previously the Suntory Restaurant and until June 2024 housed Tetsuya's restaurant. The property is privately owned. It was added to the New South Wales State Heritage Register on 2 April 1999.

== History ==
The Judges House was built and most probably designed by William Harper and constructed in 1827. It is historically significant because it represents the oldest building in the City area that was originally constructed as a private residence. Adding to its significance is that, after considering Harper's situation, skills and other evidence, we are now able with some degree of certainty to attribute the design of the house to Harper. Further, it demonstrates a very early use of corrugated iron in the colony. The house is significant architecturally, because it represents one of the earliest remaining examples of the Colonial Georgian house in Sydney.

While there is no evidence remaining on the site of its use as a refuge and soup kitchen, the range of uses from gentleman's residence to night refuge and soup kitchen for the homeless, also contributes to its historic value. Such uses reflect the changing character of the area, as it evolved from an idyllic waterfront environment to a congested and less salubrious precinct. From a social perspective the house has cultural and social links with the experiences of unemployed and homeless people during a period of 100 years including the depression eras of the 1890s and the 1930s; and because of its links with the evolution of privately funded welfare provision in Sydney. Its history embraced the diverse social environments which developed from the late 19th century through to the 1960s and provides a significant reminder that unemployment and homelessness have long been a feature of Australian society. The house has additional significance because of its associations with the legal history of NSW, through its tenancy by Judge Dowling. This association has been consolidated by its enduring title, the Judge's House.

=== William Harper: His history and career in the Colony of New South Wales ===
The building known as the Judge's House still stands at 531 Kent Street, Sydney. Its title is unusual in that it derives, not from its original owner and builder. but from its first tenant. This circumstance clearly reflects the differing status and fortunes of the two men concerned in its early history, both before and after their arrival in New South Wales.

First to arrive was William Harper, who landed at Port Jackson in 1821 with his wife and two children. Aged 29, Harper was a trained surveyor with considerable experience in land and road surveys in Scotland. He arrived with a letter of recommendation as a free settler from Earl Bathurst and professional recommendations from his patrons, Sir John Oswald and Robert Ferguson Esq of Raith.

Harper was also ambitious and enterprising. While en route and still on board the Westmoreland at Port Dalrymple, he had applied for appointment as a surveyor in Van Diemen's Land. On arrival in Sydney he continued his quest for survey work and by July, on the recommendation of Surveyor General John Oxley, had been appointed as an assistant in his department, with a salary of £109/10/0 per annum.

By the early part of 1822 Harper's expertise in road survey work was being utilised, and he surveyed a new line of road from Prospect to Richmond. He must have regarded his future as promising, especially in view of the shortage of surveyors in the colony and the great demand for their work, as its boundaries extended. But he also recognised other opportunities in the making. In a memorial addressed to Macquarie in September 1821 he declared himself possessed of property to the value of £620, which could be used in agricultural and other pursuits. Together with proceeds from the sale of property which he possessed in Scotland, his capital had the potential to reach £1,370 . Consequently he requested Macquarie to grant him a "portion of land and other indulgences...usually given to persons of his class". Macquarie responded with the promise of a grant of 283 hectares (700 acres) and three convict servants, who, together with his wife and two children, were to be victualled for six months on the King's stores.

Harper's outlook remained promising throughout most of 1822. In March of that year Governor Brisbane requested Oxley's immediate attention to the production of an accurate map of the town of Sydney, showing the exact boundaries of every grant or unexpired lease. That Harper was assigned this task reflects the confidence placed in his abilities and the urgency of the task was apparent in the Governor's later directive that "Harper was to concentrate on completing the map of Sydney and not be given any other duty till it was finished". By September of the same year favourable reports of Harper's abilities had spread beyond the confines of the colony, and Major-General Macquarie recommended him to succeed James Meehan as Deputy Surveyor General, on the latter's imminent retirement.

As 1823 progressed, however, Harper's fortunes gradually began to change. This was the result of a deterioration in his health, due to the onset of a paralytic condition which affected his right hand, reducing his capacity for field work and mapping. In September Robert Hoddle was appointed as temporary assistant surveyor and instructed to complete the map of Sydney, which had been proceeding too slowly under Harper. Oxley was instructed to order Harper to commence the survey of the County of Argyle, and if he proved "as lax, as his progress was slow in perfecting the map of Sydney", he was to be informed

...of the necessity which will be imposed on His Excellency to provide a surveyor competent to execute the public duties entrusted to him with more alacrity.

This was hardly an ideal situation for Harper to pursue his interest in land. To add to his problems Macquarie's promised grant of 283 hectares (700 acres) had not materialised and with the arrival of Governor Brisbane a different policy on land grants prevailed. Consequently, in April 1822 Harper was granted permission to occupy 283 hectares (700 acres) of land, but without the promise of a grant. This land was probably situated at Hunter's River, where, by August 1823 Harper occupied a farm of 809 hectares (2,000 acres). It was also at this time that he requested to be given a town allotment in Newcastle, on which he intended

...to erect a House for the accommodation of [himself] and Family in going to, or from the Farm.

Harper's duties in the Survey Department, however, necessitated the availability of accommodation for himself and his family in Sydney. His salary as assistant surveyor included a rental allowance of £50 per year, but this was inadequate to meet the high rental costs them prevailing in the town. Consequently, in April 1824 Harper applied to Governor Brisbane for a town allotment in Sydney on which to 'erect a house for the accommodation of [himself] and family. He was promptly informed that as the survey of the town of Sydney was complete there was no objection to his obtaining, on lease, any vacant allotment he chose.

Either by necessity or preference Harper chose an allotment on the outskirts of the town at the southern end of Kent Street. Unlike Sussex Street, which marked the western extremity of the allotment, Kent Street terminated before reaching Liverpool Street. In combination with the undulating topography of the area and its proximity to Cockle Bay, this must have contributed to the semi-rural atmosphere which prevailed. In his reminiscences of the area as it appeared in 1828 James Sheen Dowling described it as "surrounded by paddocks and comparatively in the country". Maclehose's 1839 description of the southern extremity of Kent Street indicates some change in that"

".....several cottages and substantial dwelling houses have been erected, most of them having small gardens attached. However, this section of the street still boasted ...a beautifully diversified landscape view of the waters and shores of Darling Harbour and extending to the westward over an extensive range of thickly wooded undulating country..... it only requires to be seen in order to be appreciated as one of the most romantic prospects that the eye can behold".

— Maclehose, 1839.

Surviving records do not enable a definitive dating of Harper's house, but it is clear that construction could not have commenced before the middle of 1824. A later start, however, is a distinct possibility, especially as the land had been leased, not granted, and Harper's health had already begun to deteriorate. A listing of persons eligible for jury service in Sydney, dated 1 November 1825, and organised on a street by street basis, includes Harper's name in the list for O'Connell Street, with the annotation "Surveyor General Office". As the Office was in Macquarie Street, this suggests that Harper was renting in O'Connell Street. It also seems probable that if Harper's elegant cottage had been completed by 1825, with Harper in residence, he would have proffered his Kent Street address for the listing. Even more significantly, returns of the Surveyor General's Department indicate that Harper was still receiving a rental allowance of £50 per annum in September 1826.

=== Completion of Harper's "elegant, modern" townhouse and tenancy of Judge Dowling ===
An advertisement inserted in the Sydney Gazette on 5 March 1828 provides the first indication that the House was finished. It also suggests that it provided a pleasing addition to the town

...The elegant cottage belonging to Mr Harper, which commands a fascinating view of Darling Harbour, has been let to Judge Dowling. A finer residence could not have been chosen in Sydney.

Despite the presence of such an illustrious tenant Harper's long-term plans for the house had changed. Oxley's report on the state of his department in July 1826 indicated that Harper's health had deteriorated rapidly. Referring to Messrs Rodd and Harper he noted that both

...have long been, from illness and infirmity, incapable of active field duty, or even of assisting in the construction of the required map.

By December 1826 the contents of this report had been conveyed to the Colonial Office in London, and Earl Bathurst directed that "Harper be discontinued from the Establishment". A year later Governor Darling reported that

...Mr Harper has been removed with an allowance of Six Shillings Sterling a day, as directed by Earl Bathurst.

Later events, however, indicated that Harper's illness represented a considerable loss to the "Establishment". His expertise in the compilation of plans became more evident as the century progressed because his 1823 "Plan of the allotments of Ground in Sydney" was used as the basis of most maps of the city drawn during the Nineteenth Century. Harper's retirement plans centred on the farm which he occupied at Hunter's River. His previous efforts to increase and eventually own the land he occupied there, suggest that he had made the farm a priority. The 1828 Census indicated that he had settled at Luskintyre with his wife and four children, on a farm of 1,036 hectares (2,560 acres). Consequently, Harper no longer needed his town house in Sydney and on 6 June 1828, just three months after Judge Dowling had taken up residence, the house was advertised for sale in the Sydney Gazette.

This advertisement is significant for two reasons. Firstly, it gives some clue to the completion date of the house, stating that "the whole has been recently erected". This, in turn, raises two distinct possibilities, namely that the house may have been completed just prior to Judge Dowling's tenancy and therefore that Harper and his family did not at any time reside in the house.

Secondly, while there has been some debate about the identity of the architect responsible for the house, no consensus has emerged. The June 1828 advertisement provides another direction for the debate, for it stated that the house has been erected "under the peculiar care and inspection of Mr Harper, the Architect". Several newspaper advertisements two and a half years later, for example that the Sydney Monitor of 4 December 1830, stated that 'the whole was erected by Mr Harper [sic] the Surveyor, in the most tasteful style." However, the possibility that Harper was the architect cannot be dismissed entirely. The insecurity of his employment status suggests that he would have been aiming to minimise his construction costs. In addition, a number of surveyors of the 1830s also practised as architects, despite their lacking of training in this calling. Among their number were Ambrose Hallen and Mortimer Lewis, both of whom later became Colonial Architect. Circumstances suggest that Harper may have been an even earlier proponent of his practice. The wording of the first advertisement probably reflects Harper's role in the construction of the house, and the later advertisement refer to his former career.

The 1828 advertisement described the house as having

...various out-offices; a quantity of ground commanding two street frontages, with the View of Darling Harbour, and its Scenery.

It also informed readers that the house was then 'occupied by Judge Dowling at the yearly rent of £200 per annum.

James Dowling had received his appointment as a Judge of the Supreme Court of New South Wales in August 1827, while still resident in London. Unlike Harper he thus had the assurance of employment when he arrived in the colony and a reliable income of £1,500 per year. But in common with Harper, the prospect of becoming a colonial landowner formed part of his motivation in accepting this offer. His son, James Sheen Dowling later reminisced:

...Before leaving England my father was made aware that he could claim both a town and country grant of land, by virtue of his official position. To a man who never owned a foot of land in his life, and perhaps had he remained in England never would have done so, the mere thought of becoming the owner of many acres must have been a great satisfaction.

Justice Dowling arrived at Port Jackson on the ship Hooghly on 24 February 1828, with his wife and six children. The following day he was sworn in as a Judge of the Supreme Court of New South Wales and on 29 February "took possession of a cottage in Kent Street Sydney". The house consisted of

...an entrance hall, drawing-room, dining and breakfast room, four bedrooms, study, store, closet and verandah room.

It also contained a range of out-offices, including

...a kitchen, servant's room, warehouse and oven, three-stall stable, men's room, coach-house and hay loft.

The house faced east and in view of the size of the allotment, was particularly close to the Kent Street boundary, perhaps indicating that even the time of construction Harper had made plans for subdivision of the land. Early maps indicate that other original landholders in the area followed this course. Hallen's 1830 map of Section 11, bounded by Kent, Bathurst, Sussex and Liverpool Streets shows that most of this area then consisted of allotments with frontages on both Kent and Sussex Streets.

Coupe and Hosking theorised about some aspects of the original design of the house in a 1977 architecture thesis. They suggested that its layout was basically symmetrical, with a central entrance hall and a passageway extending behind the hall. There were two large front rooms on either side of the hall, probably used as drawing and dining rooms. A large room divided into two, probably for bedrooms, lay to the north of the passage and there were two rooms to the south, which may have served as a breakfast room and a study. There was an extensive cellar beneath the house, which may have been subdivided, and a verandah which extended around three sides of the house. This ended n verandah rooms at the north and south western extremities, which would have acted as bedrooms. However, the c. 1840 watercolour indicates the existence of a verandah room extending to the front (east) wall of the cottage on the southern side.

Coupe and Hosking also highlighted certain features of the materials and detailing of the house, which they considered of a very high quality. These included the exterior walls which were of rough coursed sandstone with shell-lime mortar. They were rendered on the outside, lined to resemble ashlar masonry and probably painted. The verandah and front entrance hall were paved in square flagging, the roof was shingled, and hand-made nails were used in the flooring. Timber Doric columns on the verandah, French windows and a heavy wooden front door with a traditional Georgian fanlight lent an air of elegance to the exterior of the house.

The house thus provided adequate temporary accommodation for the Judge and his large family, catering for both family and social needs. On 10 September the Sydney Gazette reported that Justice Dowling had entertained "a numerous and distinguished "partie" to dinner at his residence", on the previous day. As a family home the cottage was enhanced by an "extensive garden in beautiful order". In addition, access to the house was soon to be improved, as the Australian of 27 August 1827 announced that

...The Government are making Kent Street passable even to the end as far as Judge Dowling's Cottage, when finished it is to be opened and made a thoroughfare into George Street. At present it terminates in what the French call a cul-de-sac.

On 29 September 1828 Judge Dowling was among the 13 successful nominees for grants on Woolloomooloo Hill. Conditions attached to the grants required that buildings to the value of £1,000 were to be erected thereon, within three years of the date of the order for the land, and plans of the proposed buildings were to be approved by the Governor.

Judge Dowling's three years in the Kent Street cottage would therefore have been busy ones. His duties at the Supreme Court were onerous and his family responsibilities considerable. Overseeing progress and development of the House at Woolloomooloo must have been demanding in these circumstances. However, an advertisement in the Sydney Gazette on 19 May 1831 indicates that the Judge amply met the deadline for the completion of his house at Woolloomooloo. It stated that the Kent Street cottage was again offered for lease, describing it as "that elegant and modern residence, lately occupied by His Honour Mr Justice Dowling".

The three years of Judge Dowling's residence in the cottage marked the beginning of his career as a Judge of the Supreme Court of NSW and the period when he was the least senior member of its bench. Consequently, the highlights of his career occurred after he had vacated the Kent Street Cottage. These included his appointment as the second Chief Justice of NSW on 30 August 1837, his knighthood in 1838 and his membership of the Legislative Council. His death at age 57, on 27 September 1844 has been attributed to his very heavy workload during the sixteen years of his judicial service. It is fortunate that his numerous judgements, letters and reports have survived, to provide a valuable record of the law as applied in the NSW Supreme Court between 1828 and 1844.

=== Sale and leasing of the Judge's House ===
On 19 October 1831, almost a year after the departure of Judge Dowling and his family from the Kent Street cottage, Harper received a grant of the allotment on which the house was situated. In the interim he had tried, apparently unsuccessfully to lease the house. Somewhat surprisingly, a later advertisement indicated that the interior of the house had been in need of some repairs, including painting. These had been carried out and "an elegant gate and railing" were being made for the front of the premises, while a garden "well stocked with trees" provided another inducement. Harper was obviously interested in an extended lease of the cottage, for it was stated that "every necessary improvement will be made to a Tenant who will lease the residence for a term of years".

It was also about this time that he subdivided the land, leasing and then selling the Sussex Street subdivision to JH Potts. But it was to be another four years the Kent Street cottage was sold to the merchant entrepreneur, John Terry Hughes. This occurred on 23 March 1835, a little over a year before Harper's sudden death at Hunter's River on 10 May 1836.

Harper's cottage thus became another item in the extensive property holdings of John Terry Hughes, who probably continued to offer it for lease. Although the history of the property during the next several decades is difficult to trace with complete precision, certain factors emerge. In 1843 Hughes mortgaged the property to the Bank of Australia, which acquired the property outright in 1846. This acquisition was part of an insolvency action presumably occasioned by the depressed economy of the 1840s, which brought many colonial landholders to bankruptcy.

In 1845 Thomas Hyndes was listed as proprietor in the City Council's Rate Assessment Books. Hyndes and his wife, Charlotte, purchased the property in February 1850. Charlotte died soon after the Hyndes married Lucy Havens, at which time the property formed part of a marriage settlement to Havens and Hyndes. On the death of Hyndes in 1855, Lucy Hyndes (nee Havens) became owner. Lucy married William Purves in 1859 and on her death in 1867 the property passed to him. William Purves died in 1870 and left the property to his three children. In 1879 the trustees of the Purves Estate sold the site to the trustees of the City Night Refuge and Soup Kitchen. Sydney City Council rate assessment books indicate that the property was leased continuously during the period intervening between the first assessment entry in 1845 and the 1879 sale to the Night Refuge.

Little is known of the cottage during its long leasing cycle, although the Council assessment books provide some details. 1845 returns indicate that the house had a cellar and its building consisted of a detached kitchen, wash-house, stables and coach-house. By 1867 the outbuildings included a stable and coach-house, but two small brick houses on the premises were also included in the assessment, both having been leased. These houses were very small, one consisting of only one room, the other two, the former being "in very bad order". Possibly they represented some of the former outbuildings, which had been converted for residential use.

Assessment books also supply some details of tenants during this period. These included Robert Mansfield, 1845, Raply Mansfield, 1848, Henry Cohen, 1859, John Micklejohn, 1861, David Utley and James Rowe in the detached cottages, 1867.

Because the street numbers changed during the leasing period it is difficult to assess the accuracy of the information supplied by the assessment books. No street numbers appear in the 1845 and 1848 returns, but by 1859 the cottage appeared to be at number 529, and by 1867 at 535.

The nature and appearance of the southern end of Kent Street also changed dramatically. The comparatively rural setting of Harper's 1828 cottage watercolour, 'View of Kent Street and Darling Harbour looking South "shows some remaining open paddocks on the steep elevated portion of the street, perhaps near Church Hill, and an increasing density of housing towards the south. The street had also become a popular location for public houses, and by "the early fifties....[they stood] at almost every corner".

As the Kent Street congestion increased in the second half of the nineteenth century other problems accompanied it. On 12 January 1870 fifteen residents of the street signed a petition to the Mayor, calling his attention to

...the great nuisance and disgusting smell originating from a drain not being covered, which is the cause of a great deal of illness in this neighbourhood.

Rate assessment books show that of the fifteen people who signed the petition, three lived in the vicinity of Harper's cottage, W. Stedman at 531, Thomas Ferris and Frederick Hughes at 519.

=== From townhouse to night refuge ===
The final decade of the long leasing cycle of the cottage was to add a new dimension to its history. This occurred in 1868, when a group of Sydney citizens came together through the efforts of Captain DC Scott, a police magistrate at the Central Police Court, to consider a proposal for the setting up of a night refuge for homeless men in Sydney. Circumstances prevailing in the city created an urgent need for such a venture. Poverty and destitution were widespread as the population swelled following the gold rushes, when many returned to seek employment in the towns. Unemployment soared in Sydney and many of its victims were charged with vagrancy in the Court, a circumstance of which Captain Scott was very well aware.

The foundation meeting of the new venture, held on 28 May 1868, soon reached consensus on the need "to establish a Night Refuge in this city for houseless poor". Events moved quickly after that. A provisional committee agreed to amalgamate the new venture with the Dixon Street Soup Kitchen, which had opened a year earlier, and it rented suitable premises at 535 Kent Street, the site of Harper's original cottage. Rent was £100 per annum for a term of two years.

Contemporary newspapers expressed great enthusiasm for the venture. The Sydney Morning Herald rated the premises "commodious" and the house "spacious". It provided a lengthy description of the layout of the house, offering valuable insight into its design and adaptation for the work of the refuge.

...The house, mostly on the ground floor, is stone built, with a broad stone-paved verandah running around three sides of it, and it contains a great number of rooms, some of which are very large. The apartment intended for the superintendent's office opens on to the verandah, on the north side, near the northern or principal entrance. Not far from this, looking on to the verandah, running parallel with the adjacent street, is the Board room.

Details of the grounds and outhouses were also included.

...At the back of the house the ground slopes off to the yard and kitchen garden. Large dry cellars opening on to the yard, here extend the whole length of the house, and are admirably adapted for workshops and stores. On the south eastern side of the residence are the kitchen offices; at right angles with the yard and opposite to that range (on the northern side of the premises) is a stone building, formerly a coach-house, and stable, but now altered for use as a receiving-house - a place to which all parties will have to be taken before they can be accommodated in the main building.

The garden and its future potential also impressed the reporter.

...The front garden is shaded with a fine row of trees, and, though not very large, has great capabilities of improvement. At the southern end of it is a shady space, formed by the angles of the main building, with an adjacent gate opening into Kent Street, but with no communication with the rear of the premises. Here it is proposed to give temporary open-air labour, in the character of a test, where such a course shall be deemed advisable. The space to the northern side is larger and will be planted with shrubs and flowers. Here also are several choice garden trees. This northernmost space opens, by a stone gateway, on to the backyard...near the Receiving House. The kitchen garden is surrounded by a lofty stone wall, and is already being reclaimed from its late state - that of a most melancholy weedy wilderness. The chief municipal authorities of this city have most thoughtfully consented to send thirty cartloads of street sweepings to mix up with the soil of this garden, and to cover the roots of the Moreton Bay fig trees in front.

Many citizens assisted in carrying out necessary alterations to adapt the premises for use as a Refuge. Two large new boilers and a furnace were fitted into the kitchen. A larger boiler, of 100 gallons capacity, for boiling clothes and blankets was to be set up on the flagging outside. The timber garden fence - "to run all along the back, separating the yard from the back garden" was to be restored. Labour and materials to effect all these changes had been, or were to be, donated. Water was being laid on by the Corporation and the Gas Company was installing gas pipes, all free of charge. Others "promised plants and bulbs for the front garden and suitable seeds and herbs etc for the kitchen garden". Harper's elegant, modern, gentleman's residence of 1828 was thus transformed into a Mecca for homeless men, opening as the City Night Refuge and Soup Kitchen on 1 July 1868, forty years on.

A Ticket system was used to dispense relief. Subscribers to the Refuge received tickets at 3s per dozen, which they handed to people applying to them for help. Three times a day "a good wholesome meal" was served,

Dinner [being] given to all presenting a ticket; Breakfast and Supper only on the condition that the recipient work[ed] during the afternoon.

The dining room, which accommodated fifty at a time, was fitted with shelves and tables, but in the early years no seats were provided. During the Refuge's first year of operation approximately 65,000 meals and 12,000 nights' shelter were given.

When the Night Refuge first leased the premises there were other buildings on the site, in addition to the Judge's House. These comprised

...brick cottage occupied as a residence by the Manager and Matron and also used as a board room for the Institution and several old cottages subsequently demolished.

Accommodation for the men was provided in three apartments, whose location is difficult to determine. The Herald report, prior to the opening of the Refuge, implied that there was to be accommodation "in the main building". According to another source the stable, coach-house, and loft were thoroughly cleaned and made habitable as sleeping places.

The premises were ideally located in what was then a central part of the city, but there were a number of disadvantages in the facilities on site. Of primary concern was the inadequate size of the mess room and kitchen. The limitations of the kitchen are not surprising because, despite modifications, it was the original detached kitchen erected for Harper's cottage. There was also no suitable accommodation on the site for women. The latter were provided with food to take away and in some cases with accommodation elsewhere, paid for by the Refuge. Because of such limitations, a building fund was soon established "for the purchase or erection, at some future time, of suitable premises", and it was decided to allocate "any large, special contributions" to this fund.

As the refuge was then the only institution in Sydney which offered "immediate reception" for people in distress, its work escalated rapidly. In the year ending 30 June 1872, 77, 984 meals and 26,292 nights' shelter were provided. Although the administrators managed to meet the mounting expenses of the Refuge, little was added to the building fund. When the lease of the property expired in July 1873 their plans to purchase or erect suitable premises remained as elusive as ever. Leasing remained the only option for the foreseeable future, and the lease on the property was renewed for seven years.

In an 1877 application to the City Council for exemption from water rates on the property, the Refuge Manager, HB Lee, emphasised "a variety of ways" in which the Refuge "constantly relieve[d] the pressure of poverty and misery". Lee stated

...it affords accommodation to the houseless to the number of 75 each night and gives over 5,000 meals each month...One of its principal branches of operation is that of obtaining work for the unemployed - this it does constantly. Numbers of men obtain employment through its instrumentality.

Lee provided a useful outline of the financial situation of the Refuge to support the application. It received "no government assistant" for this work and was "entirely non-sectarian". Consequently,

...The resources of the Institution are very slender... The greatest contributions are in kind - about a ton of provisions are collected each week and dispensed to the hungry - 500 Tons have been gathered and distributed since we commenced... The funds at the present time are exhausted owing to increased but necessary expenditure this year.

However, as the work of the refuge became better known and appreciated throughout the city, Government assistance was sought to augment the building fund. The second application, made early in 1878 was successful and £1,000 was added to the fund. The timing of the grant proved opportune as the premises were advertised for sale by auction in May 1879. Despite the well-known inadequacies of the premises for refuge purposes, the dimensions of the land offered scope for future development and the administrators purchased the property for £4,060.

2,060 was paid at the time of purchase and the balance remained on a mortgage of 6% for three years. In 1881 a deputation from the Refuge obtained from the Colonial Secretary a promised Government contribution of £1,000 towards the building fund, on condition that the Refuge raised an equal amount. With the help of this contribution, the mortgage was discharged in 1883.

Meanwhile, others had been evaluating the potential of the site. In 1874 the Council of Education had purchased the adjoining Sussex Street site, which had been part of Harper's original grant. The Sussex Street Public School was constructed on this site between 1875 and 1877, and in 1880 the Department of Public Instruction (the successor to the Council of Education) approached the administrators of the Refuge with a proposal for the purchase of their Kent Street property. The administrators' rejection of the proposal now appears significant, relative to the prospects for long-term survival of the Judge's House.

Demands on the Refuge continued to grow, as police, ministers of religion and city missionaries frequently sent people to the Refuge, in addition to those who found their own way there. Dove's 1880 Plan of Sydney indicates that three extra rooms had been attached to the Refuge, one on the southern side adjoining the verandah rooms, and two on the western wall, and a series of outbuildings and sheds were ranged round the northern and southern perimeters of the block. There was a large garden at the rear of the refuge and a smaller garden area in front. But the premises at this time were described as "old and dilapidated and the work [was] consequently less efficiently performed than it otherwise would be".

Despite such an unfavourable evaluation by officialdom others recognised the aesthetic appeal of the site. In April 1882 a reporter from the Sydney Mail recorded more satisfying impressions

...it is an old house that has in old days accommodated people of a better class, with a broad verandah supported by wooden pillars and made shady by a line of Moreton Bay figs. A place where you might expect to hear children sing rather than casuals beg.

The Sydney Mail report indicated that by 1882 very little of the actual welfare work of the Refuge was carried on in Harper's cottage.

...the bulk of the front building being occupied by the boardroom and the apartments of the managerial staff, [while] the recipients of charity are accommodated in various outbuildings at the rear.

The reading room was described as "one of the most cheerful" of these apartments, but far less pleasant was the smokehouse, or disinfecting chamber at the rear. Designed to deal with "the constant fresh importations" of vermin, it was a

...grim and ghastly sort of sepulchre...a rude stone vault with a pipkin of sulphur in the centre [and] garments of all kinds hung about the walls.

Sleeping accommodation had long been inadequate and in 1885 a temporary dormitory was erected to meet the growing demand. Its exact location is not known, but it may have been a long narrow building located behind the Refuge in an 1887 map, roughly at the centre of the site, and occupying part of the garden area as shown on Dove's plan. This building was still extant on a 1920 survey map of the Fire Underwriters' Association, which indicated that it was constructed of corrugated iron, a material which could well have been used for what was planned as a temporary building.

Subsequent additions to the site were planned for permanency. In February 1886 Robert Guy, honorary secretary of the Refuge, wrote to the Mayor and Aldermen of the City of Sydney informing them that the committee intended to commence the erection of a permanent structure on their land in Kent Street. However, before plans could be finalised – for a building estimated to cost "five to six thousand pounds" – they were willing to set their whole frontage back to the proper street alignment, on condition that the Council allowed them "reasonable compensation for the land given up to the citizens". Their suggested compensation of £300, an amount equal to a valuation of the said land by Richardson & Wrench, was subsequently rejected by the Council.

At the time of this correspondence the Refuge building fund stood at £2,560. Despite the shortfall, a tender of Messrs Bowden and Curtis for the erection of the building was accepted on 25 November 1886 and a space was cleared on the northern margin of the site soon afterwards. Construction took approximately nine months and the building was opened on 3 March 1887.

The new building was of brick, oblong in shape and included a basement and two additional floors. The basement contained a large dining room, with a serving room and two pantries at one end and a large well-equipped kitchen adjoining. The ground and first floors comprised dormitories and manager's rooms, and at each end were wide staircases leading to the basement and street. At the rear, in a separate building, separated by an eight-foot passageway, were the bathrooms, laundry and fumigating chamber.

These facilities offered much greater scope for the provision of relief, and also freed Harper's original stone cottage for use as a residence by the manager of the Refuge. Relief, however, was still largely directed towards men. This was not to change till 1897, when a new building for the accommodation of women was erected at the southern boundary of the site. Few details of this building have survived, except that it contained women's dormitories and dining room. The 1920 survey map of the Fire Insurers' Association indicates that the building was of brick. This map also shows that the old corrugated iron building behind the cottage was then being used as dormitories and dining room for staff.

On 12 December 1933 the management of the Refuge applied for registration of the property under the Real Property Act. Registration was granted on 26 February 1935, even though it was discovered at this time that a section of land, having a frontage of one foot eight inches to Kent Street, with a depth of about sixty-three feet, was not in the applicant's deeds. This section comprises part of allotment 7, adjoining on the north, which had been granted to John Webster on 6 June 1835. The land to the north of this strip came under the Real Property Act in 1883, and the plan accompanying the application indicated that the trustees of the Night Refuge and Soup Kitchen were the owners of the said strip, which was used as an entrance to and exit from, the main building.

=== From city night refuge to Sydney City Mission ===
1945 ushered in significant change at the Refuge, marking the year when it was incorporated into the Sydney City Mission. This occurred in response to a changed approach to welfare, which emphasised rehabilitation rather than refuge. As this development co-coincided with the closure of the Mission's premises at Millers Point, following their resumption by the Government, it allowed the Mission to continue some of the services previously offered at Miller's Point at the Kent Street property.

In 1951 when Sydney City Mission appointed a full-time missionary to serve the Refuge, Harper's cottage was renovated for use as his residence. Changes at this time included the demolition of outbuildings and the blocking off of cellars.

There were further significant changes in the 1960s. In 1961 some of the dormitories were converted to a recreation room and a doctor's room, staffed by honorary medical officers from Sydney Hospital, who visited the Refuge once a week. In 1963 a new building was built at the rear of the refuge, mainly by public subscription. Called the House of the Helping Hand, it offered single bedroom accommodation for residents, who undertook rehabilitation programmes aimed at helping them to gain re-employment. Finally, in 1969, ownership of the property was transferred to the Sydney City Mission. This had been delayed due to controversy regarding the transfer of the refuge to a religious organisation.

=== Sale of City Mission site to Grosvenor International (Australia): subsequent developments ===
By the time the Mission gained ownership the buildings were in dilapidated condition and the property not adequate to accommodate a desirable range of rehabilitation and welfare services. Its location, however, ensured considerable re-sale potential. Consequently, in March 1970 contracts were signed between Sydney City Mission and Grosvenor International (Australia) Developments Pty Ltd for purchase of the site at $1,250,000. The contract required Sydney City Mission to vacate by 30 June 1971, at which time the sale was to be completed.

When members of the 1788–1820 Association became aware of these developments they sought and gained permission to inspect the house, then known as the Superintendent's cottage. Their inspection convinced them of its historical value and they warned the National Trust of the impending threat to the future preservation of the cottage.

By December 1970 Grosvenor International had lodged its proposed plans for redevelopment, seeking consent to erect a multi-storeyed building on the site, at a cost of $4,900,000, for use as offices and an associated car park. In March of the following year Sydney City Council informed Grosvenor that a decision on their development application had been deferred, pending completion and adoption of Action Plan No. 4, "Parking Stations on the Western Perimeter of the Central Business District". This deferment was to be expected, as the property was within the area covered by the plan. The delay may not have caused undue concern to Grosvenor because in the interim they had agreed to a request from Sydney City Mission to delay completion of purchase of the site to 30 June 1972, when the Mission expected their new premises at Surry Hills to be completed.

Both the National Trust of Australia (NSW) and the 1788–1820 Association monitored these developments closely and became increasingly concerned about the threat posed to the preservation of the historic cottage. Ten years earlier the National Trust had given the cottage a "B" classification, confirming its view that it merited preservation, based on its architectural quality and historical significance. In May 1971 an article in The Australian gave public exposure to the trust's fears that the cottage at 531 Kent Street was to be demolished. These fears were seemingly well-grounded, as Grosvenor failed to make public its plans for the building.

Towards the end of 1970 the architects for Grosvenor had sought the views of the trust as to whether it would be desirable to re-erect the building on another site. Although both the trust and the 1788–1820 Association declined to endorse this proposal as a desirable outcome, it was discussed as a practical alternative, if the building could not be saved.

By early 1972 there were indications that the trust's recommendation that the cottage be preserved had found favour in some official circles. At that time Sydney City Council was advised of a recommendation of the Height of Buildings Advisory Committee, asking that the Council

...might endeavour to achieve the preservation of the historic buildings on this site, particularly the Superintendents' Cottage, in their present location.

The committee suggested offering a floor space ratio bonus to Grosvenor for incorporation into other sites it owned in the City Centre, but subject to providing "satisfactory guarantees...to ensure the preservation of the historic building and its continuous maintenance".

Despite this favourable development Sydney City Council granted its consent to Grosvenor's application on 26 April 1927, without the requirement that the Judge's House be preserved. A month later the chairman of the Preservation Advisory Committee, which advised the Council on Preservation matters, wrote to the Deputy Town Clerk stating that the Committee was of "firm opinion that the building at 531 Kent Street should be preserved".

When the architects for Grosvenor lodged an application with the State Planning Authority for approval of a 22-storey building, the Height of Buildings Advisory Committee discussed with them the possibility of preserving the cottage. Grosvenor took the view that the location of the cottage and the configuration of the site precluded this possibility, but offered instead to carefully demolish the building and re-erect it at the proposed historic part at Gosford. In August 1972 the State Planning Authority sought the views of the National Trust on this proposal, as requested by the height of Buildings Advisory Committee.

The trust failed to endorse the proposal, stating that

...if the cottage is demolished and re-erected on another site it will lose almost all of its historical significance, and its architectural significance will be considerably diminished because of the small amount of original material which could be re-used.

The trust recommended an alternative proposal that the State Planning Authority investigate the possibility of the Crown making available to Grosvenor the site of the Technical College Annexe in Sussex Street, which adjoined Grosvenor's site, in return for Grosvenor making the cottage available to the Crown in a restored state.

Early in 1973, however, following discussions with the State Planning Authority, Grosvenor revised its development plans to allow for the retention of the cottage on the site. Sydney newspapers gave wide coverage to this new turn of events. Although the early 1970s marked an initial stage in community awareness of heritage issues, most of these reports appeared to support the efforts of the National Trust in saving the cottage from demolition.

Because of its change of plans Grosvenor was required to submit the revised scheme for Council's approval. The State Planning Authority recommended a floor space ratio of 12:1 for the revised plan, which included a 2:1 bonus for the preservation of the cottage.

Accordingly, on 27 April 1973 amended drawings were submitted to Sydney City Council, showing retention of the House and a site ratio of 12:1, as recommended by the State Planning Authority. Council's consideration of the plans was a lengthy process and it was not till 3 December 1973 that consent was granted. This included permission to erect an irregular hexagon-shaped building on the site following the demolition of existing buildings, other than the Judge's House, which was to be restored. Other conditions attached to the consent included a floor to space ratio of 9.8:1, and a tree preservation order in respect of the Moreton Bay fig trees located on the site. Finally on 14 December, the sale of the site was completed and the deed transferred to Grosvenor.

State Planning Authority approval for the application was granted in February 1974. But by this time Grosvenor appeared to have lost interest in such a troublesome project and, other than demolishing the Sydney City Mission buildings on the site, made no move to proceed with it. Instead, on 6 September 1974, its architects, Buchan Laird & Buchan, applied successfully for a 12 month extension of the Development application approval, which was due to lapse on 3 December 1974. The reasons cited for the request were the "industrial and economic difficulties in the building industry" at that time.

In the interim the deteriorating state of the cottage had become a matter of concern for those interested in its preservation. In May the Preservation Advisory Committee reported that the Judge's House was

...falling into a state of disrepair, due mainly to the premises being unoccupied and illegal entry being gained by vandals.

The committee also requested the council 'to insist on the owner of the site taking all possible steps to see that the "Judge's House" [was] maintained in a satisfactory condition'.

The City Planning and Building Department reacted promptly to this report. On 27 May the Deputy City Building Surveyor wrote to Grosvenor, reminding the company of its responsibilities concerning the Judge's House, and stating that

...a recent inspection disclosed that entry to the Cottage is being gained by vandals who are causing damage to such an extent that restoration work could be impossible. Furthermore, the rooms are littered with all types of rubbish.

Consequently, Grosvenor was requested to remove all the rubbish and "adequately barricade the premises to prevent entry of unauthorised persons".

Following a revision of its classification of the Judge's House in February 1975 the National Trust wrote to Grosvenor stating that the house had been included in the trust's register with a classified listing, and setting out its belief that the preservation of the building was "essential to the heritage of Australia". This communication, however, did not provide any significant change in Grosvenor's handling of its responsibilities towards the building.

Early in 1976 the New South Wales Chapter of the Royal Australian Institute of Architects added to the chorus of concern regarding the state of the Judge's House. The chapter wrote to Grosvenor, emphasising the increasing deterioration in the condition of the building and suggesting that a tenant or user be found "to ensure its maintenance and ultimate preservation". Grosvenor replied that having made numerous unsuccessful efforts to find a suitable tenant, they considered it pointless to pursue the matter further. Conversion of the building to an office block was not an economic proposition, and although they indicated that they would be ready to consider any reasonable proposal, this had little meaning as "they would be prepared to outlay little, if any, money themselves". They were of the opinion that

...market conditions and the "off-centre" location of the site seemed likely to preclude commencement of the planned redevelopment for about five years.

In March 1976 the Chapter's letter was discussed at a meeting of the Preservation Advisory Committee, when the Committee resolved to request the Council to review the question of the bonus scheme relative to developments involving restoration of historic buildings. The Committee suggested that a condition could be included in the development consent requiring restoration of such preserved buildings to have substantially commenced within 12 months of the consent being granted. On 10 May 1976 Sydney City Council passed a resolution to consider this proposal.

Grosvenor, meanwhile, had tried to revive its earlier proposal that the house be moved, citing the removal of Richmond Villa to make way for extensions to Parliament House, which was then in progress, in support of this view. This alternative was not endorsed by the National Trust, and in September 1976, Grosvenor approached the City Council seeking permission to demolish the cottage. As this permission was not forthcoming the Company submitted its 1973 development plans for a high rise building to be located behind the Judge's House, which was to be restored.

This application was approved by the Council on 12 December 1977, but early in 1978 a motion to rescind and amend the approval was placed before the Council. The amendment provided only for the restoration of the Judge's House and rejected the approval for a high rise office block. Although this amendment was not approved by Council, Grosvenor soon decided to terminate its long wait for a more sympathetic climate in which to pursue its commercial development of the site. It opted, instead, to sell the rear part of the site to Suntory Australia Pty Ltd and restore the Judge's House as its Australian head office, which opened for business in August 1978.

In May 1979 Sydney City Council approved Suntory's plans for the construction of a two storey restaurant and basement car park on its land, close to the rear of the Judge's House.

After such a long and chequered history the future of this historic house was finally secured on 15 December 1980, when a permanent conservation order was placed on the building and its site, under the provisions of the Heritage Act of 1977. Four years later the Judge's House was purchased by Allind Pty Ltd, after which the building was used as offices by that Company, and also by Davids Investments Pty Ltd. Allind carried out further restoration work on the house in 1992, when the foundations of the house were strengthened with concrete and steel supports.

In 1997 Capital Group Properties Pty Ltd purchased The Judge's House for use of its corporate office and has since undertaken refurbishment and renovation of the garden and parts of the building, in a manner which is sympathetic to the heritage of the property.

=== Adaptive reuse ===
Following its preservation in the 1970s, the property was converted to commercial use. A Japanese-inspired restaurant was built on the western portion of the site in the late 1970s, while the historic house was restored as offices. The restaurant later operated as Tetsuya's, which used the house as its dining room until the restaurant closed in mid-2024.

== Description ==
=== Site description ===
The study area is located on the west side of Kent Street, a short distance to the north of the intersection with Liverpool Street. It is encircled by recent commercial buildings: a multi-storey car park to the north, cinema complex to the east on the opposite side of Kent Street, a multi-storey residential building to the south and the Japanese-inspired "Suntory" restaurant to the west (rear).

The study area is occupied by a single storey cottage, with basement. This is surrounded by gardens, and a bitumen surfaced car park adjoins the southern verandah. The cottage is an 1820s Colonial Georgian single storey bungalow in its near original form which still retains a visual curtilage with sympathetic landscaping reminiscent of its original Kent Street setting. It retains some mature trees making a strong visual contribution both to the site and to this part of Kent Street. These include two very large Moreton Bay fig trees (Ficus macrophylla) and one mature evergreen /southern magnolia/ bull bay (M.grandiflora) along the street front. They also include large shrubs/ small trees to the rear of the cottage, being a Japanese maple (Acer palmatum) to the south-west of the cottage and a large autumn camellia (C.sasanqua cv.) to the cottage's north-west. To the cottage's immediate west is a two storeyed "Japanese" style building housing a restaurant.

=== Architectural context ===
The house is described in its heritage listing as a rare surviving example of the Old Colonial Georgian style in central Sydney. The style is characterised by symmetrical facades, hipped roofs and the use of locally quarried sandstone, typical of domestic architecture in the colony during the 1820s. Unlike later Victorian terraces, the building retains the restrained classical proportions of the Macquarie and Brisbane eras.

=== The Judge's House ===
This section is a brief description of the building and its landscaped surrounds as currently exists. The cottage is an 1820s Colonial Georgian single storey bungalow in its near original form, with basement. It was designed and built with a verandah on three sides terminated by enclosed stone walled rooms at the sides (now demolished), all capped by a continuous hipped roof though with a different pitch over the verandahs.

=== External fabric ===
==== Walls ====
North, South and West Walls

- Coursed sandstone rubble of solid construction approx. 600 thick, externally, repainted with hard cement mortar and coated with what appears to be a cement based product.
- Dressed sandstone architraves sills reveals and thresholds; some are recent replacement.
- Dressed sandstone quoins to external corners; some are recent replacement.
- North and south verandah room doorways have been infilled and made good.
- West wall openings have also been modified.

East Wall

- Hard cement ashlar pattern stucco presumably over coursed rubble.
- Dressed sandstone plinth and window and door architraves.
- Stucco appears to have cement based coating.

Comments

- All walls are generally in good condition.
- Minor hairline cracks are evident in north and south walls.
- Internal dampness in walls at basement level is likely to be attributable, at least in part, to the micro irrigation system installed in the abutting garden beds (which would appear to be designed and maintained as part of the Suntory Restaurant landscaping.)
- Apart from the replacement sandstone sills and other minor sandstone repairs most of the fabric is original and in good condition.

==== Chimneys ====
- Both chimneys are brick with stucco finish and a cement based coating.
- Cowls to protect air conditioning duct openings have been fitted.
- From inside roof space staining on chimney brickwork indicates falling damp from earlier failures.

==== Main roof ====
- Of hipped form, it is currently clad with replacement redwood shingles sarked with foil insulation.
- The original shingles and the more recent galvanised iron were removed in 1977 to facilitate this reconstruction.
- Original main roof framing members appear to be largely intact with some recent replacements evident.
- There is a short eave overhang to the western wall only.
- The original verandah roof was pitched from directly under the main roof on the side and front walls.
- Beyond the current reconstructed side verandah returns there are sandstone plinths flush with the outside walls.
- Currently there are ogee gutters on timber fascias with round downpipes connected to subsurface drains. The original gutter system is unknown.
- The roof drainage system was not observed in operation.
- Currently hip and ridge flashings to the shingles are concealed. Historical sketches indicate expressed external flashings on the original roof probably of sheet lead material.
- The main roof shingle cladding exhibits isolated deterioration; it is considered likely that it will need replacement within about 10 years.

==== Space 01 - main verandah ====
- Formed as a flatter pitched extension to the main roof, hipped roof returns have been reconstructed to north and south elevations, where records show the original roofs have been demolished; the returns are not of the same form as the original, and are shorter in length.
- Verandah posts are of turned timber on timber plinths with Alcor flashings on mortar bed. Although most appear to be reconstructions, those flanking the front door are original. The verandah columns have reconstructed Tuscan style bases.
- The verandah beam for two bays south of the entrance appears original.
- Examination of the verandah roof construction shows original verandah rafters connecting to the main rafters over the wall plates.
- The original verandah ceiling was timber lath and plaster; the recent lining is bead-edged T&G; softwood boarding.
- The original roofing is likely to have been timber shingles; and illustration c.1840, however, indicates that corrugated galvanised iron replaced the shingles at an early date.
- The current reconstruction of square battened sheet iron is conjectural and inaccurate.
- Gutters are ogee profile. Originally it is likely there would have been none.
- The floor is a recent reconstruction of sandstone flagstones laid in a random coursed pattern. Edges are bullnosed.
- Evidence indicates that originally the flagstones were laid in a diamond pattern.
- Two horizontal cast iron ventilator grilles have been installed in front of doors W5 and W6, presumably in the 1991 basement enlargement.

==== Rear verandah ====
- A verandah roof at basement level was added in 1991. It is of hipped form with a corrugated galvanised iron roof. There are timber rafters, fascias and posts and lead flashings to hips and the west wall of the building.

==== Windows ====
- Georgian pattern six paned double-hung sashes.
- Some original joinery may remain in windows W11 and W12 but otherwise they appear to be recent reproductions.
- Some original splayed panelled and moulded boxing shutters with hinged bifolding shutter and backflap appear to remain; all are now fixed in position.
- One of the recently added basement windows has 9 panes and there is a single paned toplight above W11.

==== Doors ====
- Glazed twelve paned (per leaf) french doors to north, east and south elevations. Each door has a low kick panel and several appear to be original with remnant glass panes.
- Original splayed panelled and moulded boxing shutters with hinged bifolding shutter and backflap, in two heights, appear to remain on Windows W1, W4, W5 and W6 top. All are now fixed in position. Where linings are reconstructions, mouldings are slightly different from originals.
- The six panelled solid timber front door appears to be original, as does the fanlight although now incorrectly hung with the inside facing out.

==== Other ====
- Recent excavated stair and path to basement windows and doors on west wall.
- Recent timber lattice screen and reinforced concrete plinth to the air conditioning plant against south end of west wall.

=== Internal fabric ===
==== Ground floors ====
Space 02 - entrance hall

- Original stone flags relaid on compressed fibre cement sheet (CFC) at time of basement expansion (1991).

Spaces 09 and 10 - Toilets

- Ceramic tiles on CFC sheet.

Other

- Timber floors and joists overlaid with carpet. Joists are visible in basement; some insect damage evident below ceiling line.

==== Basement floors ====
- Carpet over concrete slabs on ground.

==== Ground floor walls ====
- Single leaf brick plastered and painted.
- Drummy plaster evident in front rooms. Original plaster mouldings to the lath and plaster passageway arch remain.
- The toilets have recent partitions fittings and tiled dados with cap moulds.
- The wall between Space 08 Archives Room and Space 04/07 Office No. 3 is timber lath and plaster.
- A recent timber framed partition forms the storeroom in Space 07 Office No. 3. All walls in this office are covered with recent decorative scrim.
- Moulded timber chair rails to most rooms are probably a recent introduction.

==== Basement walls ====
- Original sandstone rubble recently repainted and coated.
- Walls to the rooms east of the north/south centre line are not original, being introduced during the 1991 additions and alterations.

==== Ground floor ceilings ====
Space 02 - entrance hall

- Original in-situ moulded plaster cornices visible with new fibrous plaster centre panel.

==== Toilets ====
- Beaded timber boarding against original plaster moulded cornices.

==== Other areas ====
- Generally plasterboard with recent reproduction Victorian era cornice in Space 05. The original moulded plaster cornices are visible in Spaces 06 and 08.
- Original lath and plaster ceilings are evident in roof space as is the subsequent early 20th century pressed metal ceiling below. Original cornices are intact in part but concealed by later ceilings.

==== Basement ceilings ====
- Flush plasterboard to storage areas and Office 4.
- Plasterboard between timber floor joists in other areas.
- A plasterboard bulkhead connects air conditioning services at ceiling level on the western side of the central north/south internal walls.

==== Fireplaces ====
- Fireplaces in Spaces 05 and 06 survive. They have been fitted with late Victorian register grates and recent slate hearths.
- The fireplace in the Space 08 is original but has an introduced chimney piece. Recently it has been converted to a cupboard.
- Both fireplaces in Space 07 have been boarded up and their chimney pieces are missing.
- Beaded corner mouldings exist on the chimney breasts in the rear offices.
- Chimneys have been extensively used for air-conditioning and ventilation ducting and loss of fabric has occurred as a result above ceilings in the roof space.

==== Joinery ====
Doors

- All internal doors are painted to panelled doors of Georgian Colonial pattern hung on reproduction brass butt hinges and fitted with brass mortise locks.
- There are painted moulded architraves of Georgian Colonial pattern surrounding all doors.
- All hardware is brass reproduction.

Windows

- all windows as described elsewhere are of Georgian Colonial pattern double hung type fitted with brass reproduction sash fasteners and lifts. Al timberwork, including frames, panelled reveals and spandrels is painted.

Skirtings

- Most rooms have moulded and painted timber skirtings of early Victoria pattern fitted.

Dado rails

- Most rooms have recent moulded and painted timber chair rails of Georgian Colonial pattern fitted.

==== Garden areas ====
Gardens - Kent Street area

- Narrow garden of shrubs dominated by 2 mature Moreton Bay fig trees showing signs of distress.
- Garden screened from street by a box hedge behind a reproduction steel painted pike and rail palisade fence set on a low sandstone wall; the wall and timber paling fence (now demolished) was constructed c.1887 when Kent Street was resurfaced.

North Garden area

- Narrow garden of a Magnolia tree, Plane tree and small shrubs predominantly Azaleas.

South and West Garden areas

- Narrow gardens predominantly of ground cover with small shrubs.

Paved areas

Front Path and Returns along Verandah

- Contemporary extruded clay paving bricks laid in stretcher bond.

Parking area and driveway

- Bitumen paving with heavy steel tubular crash barrier along length of southern verandah return.

Comment

- Miro-irrigation to the gardens and the lace of a waterproof barrier between the earth and the walls on the north and south garden beds contributes to the occurrence of dampness in adjoining internal faces of basement walls.

==== Services ====
- All electrical and hydraulic services have been installed as new in recent renovation work.
- Air conditioning distribution ductwork has been routed through ceilings and into chimneys and bulkheads at basement level.
- Air conditioning plant is externally located at rear of building and in the roof space.

==== Basement ====
- The basement rooms east of the north/south centre line were excavated and established in the 1991 additions and alterations resulting in substantial modifications to the floor structures under the Entrance Hall and two front rooms at ground level.
- Original floor joists appear to have been retained but the rest of the work is new

=== Modifications and dates ===
Site

The site is reduced in extent and has been encircled by recent commercial buildings: a multi-storey car park to the north, cinema complex to the east on the opposite side of Kent Street, a multi-storey residential building to the south and the Japanese-inspired "Suntory" (now Tetsuya's) restaurant to the immediate west.

1828 J.S. Dowling described it as "surrounded by paddocks and comparatively in the country". Maclehose's 1839 description of the southern extremity of Kent Street indicates some change in that, 'several cottages and substantial dwelling houses have been erected, most of them having small gardens attached. However, this section of the street still boasted ...a beautifully diversified landscape view of the waters and shores of Darling Harbour and extending to the westward over an extensive range of thickly wooded undulating country.

Maclehose concluded that "it only requires to be seen in order to be appreciated as one of the most romantic prospects that the eye can behold".

House & Garden

The bungalow is in its near original form which still retains a reduced but reasonably intact immediate visual curtilage with sympathetic landscaping to the east, south and north reminiscent of its original Kent Street setting.

The bungalow's verandah on three sides was terminated by enclosed stone walled rooms at the sides (now demolished). Modified to be a night refuge and soup kitchen.

== Heritage listing ==
The house is of national historic significance as the earliest surviving, albeit considerably altered, single storey freestanding house in the central area of Sydney.

The place is of state historic significance through its association with important early residents of NSW, namely William Harper, a surveyor and the likely designer of the house, and Judge James Dowling of the Supreme Court.

The site is of state social significance through its association with City Night Refuge and Soup Kitchen, a pioneer charitable organisation (later the Sydney City Mission), from 1868 to 1972. The house is the sole reminder of this period, all other components related to this phase having been demolished for construction of the Suntory Restaurant. Its use by a charitable organisation for more than 100 years ensured its conservation during many periods of Sydney's development.

The house is of state architectural significance as a rare example of an 1820s Colonial Georgian single storey bungalow to survive in its near original form which still retains a visual curtilage with sympathetic landscaping reminiscent of its original Kent Street setting. The house was designed and built with a verandah on three sides terminated by enclosed stone walled rooms at the sides (now demolished), all capped by a continuous hipped roof though with a different pitch over the verandahs. It retains the ability for further conservation and the potential to demonstrate the form and uses of its interiors.

Although its present use is commercially orientated it is still able to demonstrate the high standard of dwelling to which Sydney residents were in a position to aspire to in the early part of the 19th century. It remains probably the only example of such a building to remain in the centre of a major city in Australia.

The house is of state technical significance for the evidence it provides of the high quality of design, building and decoration skills available in Sydney in the 1820s.

This evidence is embodied in the spatial planning of the building; the skilful use of sandstone; the fine joinery that survives intact; and the surviving plaster walls, in-situ run cornices and ceilings.

The Judges House was listed on the New South Wales State Heritage Register on 2 April 1999.

== See also ==
- Australian residential architectural styles
- Media related to The Judges House at Wikimedia Commons
