= Damien Pignolet =

Australian chef based in Sydney

Coordinates: 33.888364°S 151.236889°E

Damien Pignolet (born c. 1948) is an Australian chef who created the Josephine Pignolet Young Chef of the Year Award. Pignolet was born in Melbourne, Victoria. He is a second-generation Australian of French descent. He studied at the William Angliss College of Catering from 1966.

== Early years and adversity ==
Pignolet has overcome adversity in his life. Going into hospital at the age of 5, he came out when he was eight, spending almost four years lying flat in a full-body cast because of a rare hip disease. Pignolet says the experience made him inward-looking and shy and couldn't play sports for years. "I was always the odd person out," he remembers. "I lived in a complete fantasy world." Pignolet found comfort in cooking and started out utilising Women's Weekly cookbooks but soon went to the local library and discovered the great chef, Escoffier.

In 1966 Pignolet began a four-year course in catering and hotel management at William Angliss College. His career began in catering and led to teaching and the administration of a Melbourne cooking school. Pignolet worked in hospital and institutional cooking in Melbourne and in 1979 he moved to Sydney and made his name working in the restaurant Pavilion in the Park in the Domain. It was where, he met Josephine Carroll. Pignolet says of her "We just fell in love like that. Instantly. But she was an apprentice, I was the executive chef. We were just good friends. The next year, we changed that." Together they worked, Damien as co-owner as executive chef of Butlers then from 1981, Josephine and damien bought Claude's in Oxford Street in Woollahra and maintained it as a 36-seat classically French restaurant; the restaurant received much acclaim.

On 21 December 1987, Pignolet was driving back from Canberra, with his wife Josephine, whom he had been married to for six and a half years, together with Chefs Anne Taylor and Ian McCullough. All three were asleep and, for a split second Pignolet fell asleep and struck head on with an oncoming car, killing its driver and Josephine and seriously injuring Taylor and McCullough. Pignolet suffered major jaw injuries and broken hip requiring major surgery and kept in hospital for three months and 2 months at home recuperating.

== Josephine Pignolet Young Chef of the Year Award ==
Josephine is remembered through the Josephine Pignolet Young Chef of the Year Award, which sends the most promising young chefs overseas. Previous winners include Mark Best, the head chef of Marque Restaurant, Damian Heads of Milsons and now Pony, Daniel Puskas and James Parry of Oscillate Wildly, and Phil Wood, Executive Chef at Rockpool Est. 1989.

In 1992 Damien went into partnership with Ron White and purchased the Woollahra Hotel creating Bistro Moncur in Woollahra.

He has been recognised as a leader in his field within New South Wales.

He is the author of French, with photography by Earl Carter, published in 2005 by Lantern (Penguin Aus.) (ISBN 192098917X). followed by Salades in 2010, with photography by Anson Smart by Lantern (Penguin Aus) (IBSN 19209 895552)

== Bistro Moncur ==
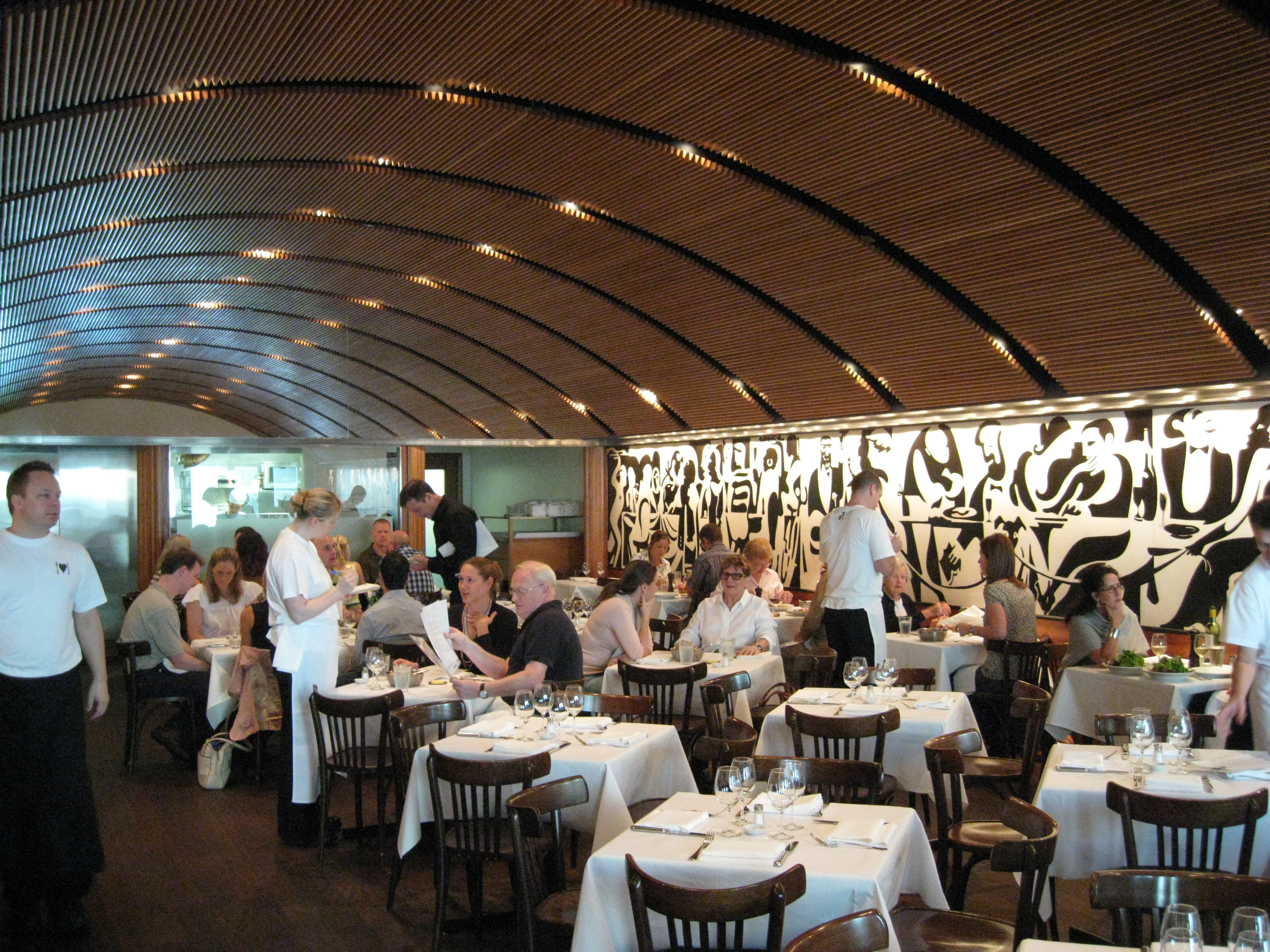
Bistro Moncur interior featuring mural by Michael Fitzjames

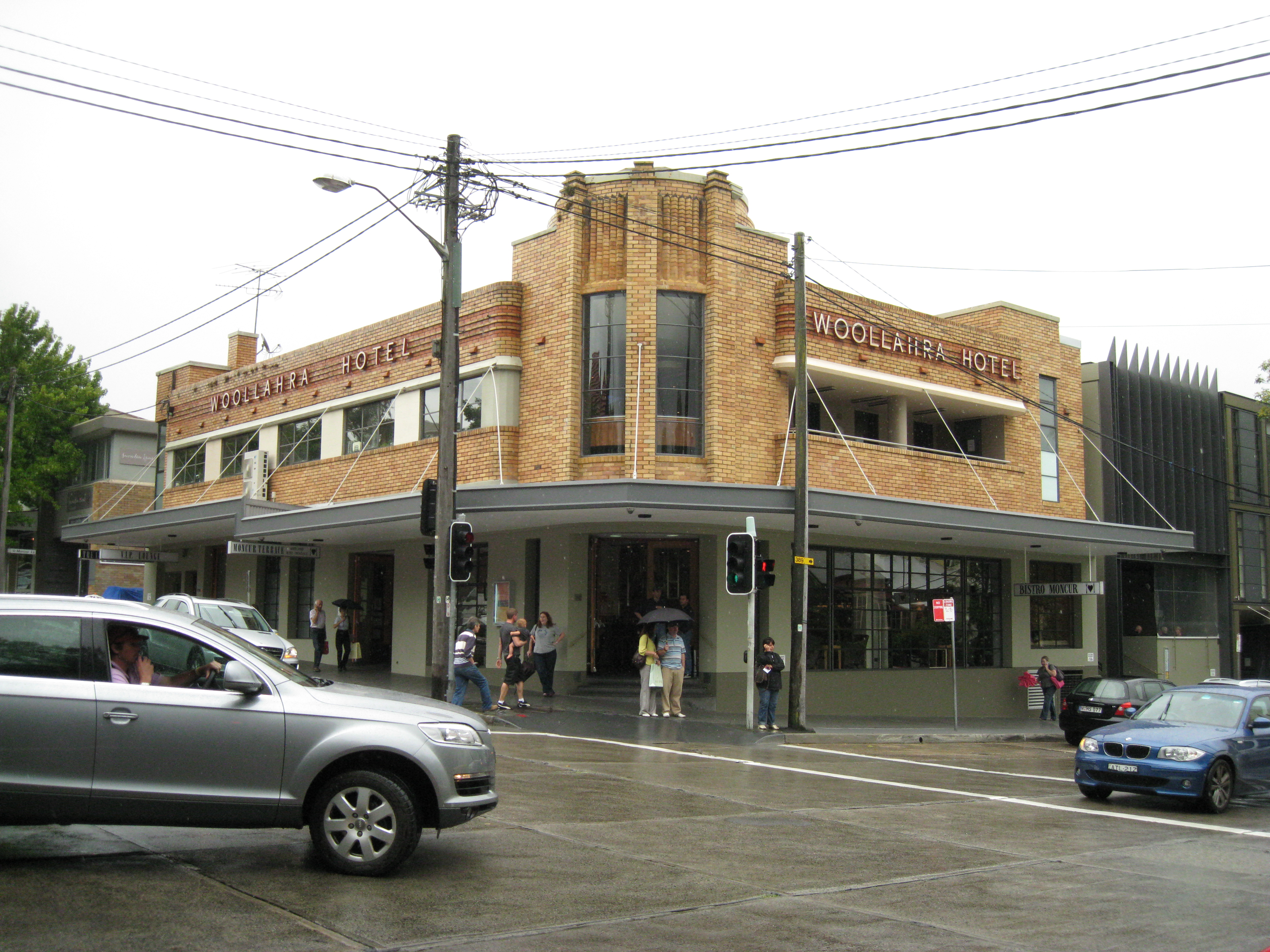
Woollahra Hotel and far right, entrance to Bistro Moncur

Bistro Moncur is a restaurant which is part of the Woollahra Hotel in Sydney, New South Wales, Australia. It opened in 1993. The main focus was French regional cuisine. Damien Pignolet held the role of the executive chef.

=== Awards ===
- Restaurant & Catering Association Awards for Excellence Winner - 2003 and 2004 - Best Restaurant in a Pub
- Sydney Morning Herald Good Food Guide 2004 - Awarded Two Chef's Hats
- Sydney Morning Herald Good Food Guide 2005 - 2007 - Awarded Two Chef's Hats
