= George Freedman =

Australian interior designer (1936–2016)

- Born: George Henry Freedman; 6 March 1936; Brooklyn, United States
- Died: July 21, 2016 (aged 80); Sydney, Australia
- Education: Brooklyn Public School; Manhattan High School; Syracuse University
- Occupation: Interior designer
- Spouse: Peter O'Brien
- Website: georgefreedman.com

George Freedman (6 March 1936 – 21 July 2016) was an American-Australian interior designer. Born in New York, where he studied architecture at Syracuse University, Freedman arrived in Sydney in 1968 and went on to design many notable interiors, often including custom-made furniture. His works included executive suites for the Bank of New South Wales (1970) and the State Bank of New South Wales (1985), cultural institutions including the Powerhouse Museum, businesses, government premises, restaurants, residences and historic monuments, including a refurbishment of the Queen Victoria Building (2009).

Freedman was posthumously inducted into the Design Institute of Australia Hall of Fame in 2019.

== Early life and education ==
Freedman was born in Brooklyn, New York, to Nathan Freedman, a colour designer for an American paint manufacturer, and Rose Freedman (née Hirsch).

From 1949 to 1953, Freedman attended Manhattan High School, then studied architecture at Syracuse University. From 1960 he began working with architects Kahn and Jacobs, where he worked on the American Airlines' first class lounge at John F Kennedy International Airport. He abandoned the final year of his degree to travel to Europe with a friend. During 1963 and 1964, he exhibited and sold artworks in Amsterdam and Brussels, then worked as an interior designer for architects Tandy Halford and Mills in London.

Returning to New York in 1968, Freedman joined the international planning unit of furniture manufacturer and interior design company Knoll and Associates. He worked with director Florence Knoll on the United States pavilion for the Osaka World Fair (1970) as well as offices for accountants Price Waterhouse in Buffalo, New York.

== Life in Australia ==
In 1969, Knoll despatched Freedman to Manhattanise and Internationalise Sydney at the executive offices and boardrooms for the Bank of New South Wales, one of Australia's oldest banking institutions.

While working on this project, Freedman began a personal relationship with prominent Sydney decorator Neville Marsh, who employed him as a designer with Neville Marsh Interiors in 1970. In 1973, the business was rebranded Marsh Freedman Associates (MFA).

As well as designing interiors for some of Sydney's richest families, MFA created fine dining rooms for a number of Sydney restaurateurs, including Anne Taylor (Taylors, 1984); Tony and Gay Bilson (Berowra Waters Inn, 1976; Kinselas, 1983; Tresury, 1992; and Ampersand, 1998); Damien and Josephine Pignolet (Claudes, 1981); Helen and Malcolm Spry (Chez Oz, 1985); Leon Fink (Bilsons and Quay, 1986, 1988), and Armando Percuoco (Buon Ricordo Ristorante refurbishment, 2007).

During the late 1980s, Neville Marsh retired from Marsh Freedman Associates and Freedman continued to practice as George Freedman Associates (with Robert Chester and Sam Marshall). In 2002 he appointed a younger architect, Ralph Rembel, as his business partner and renamed the practice 'Freedman Rembel'. This practice was dissolved in 2010, when Freedman joined architects Peddle Thorp and Walker as Head of Interior Design.

== Awards and legacy ==
In 2005, Freedman was described by The Sydney Morning Herald as "the Godfather of Interior Design". In the same year, the Royal Australian Institute of Architects (NSW Chapter) awarded Freedman Rembel an Interior Architecture commendation for its design of executive offices at the AMP Building.

Freedman's 1970s and 1980s furniture designs, often finished with luxury European veneers and eye-catching flourishes, were often featured in Australia's design magazines, especially Belle and Interior Design. His cocktail trolley for Bilson's restaurant (1988) is in the collection of Sydney's Museum of Applied Arts and Sciences. Freedman was posthumously inducted into the Design Institute of Australia Hall of Fame in 2019.

== Personal life ==
Freedman was widely known for his wit, warm laugh, home cooking, Negroni's, and devotion to his dogs (Scottish Terriers owned in pairs). In New York prior to meeting Neville Marsh, Freedman lived a sophisticated lifestyle with then partner Ronald Vance. He maintained lifelong friendships with notable Americans such as George Deem. Freedman and Marsh had successful careers in addition to their personal relationship. During the 1990s Freedman cared for his partner Neville Marsh and supported by Andrew Bryan. In 2008 he exchanged vows with Peter O'Brien at Sainte-Chapelle in Paris. They later wed in Queenstown, New Zealand when same sex marriages became legalized. Freedman died from cancer in Sydney in 2016, aged 80.

== Gallery ==
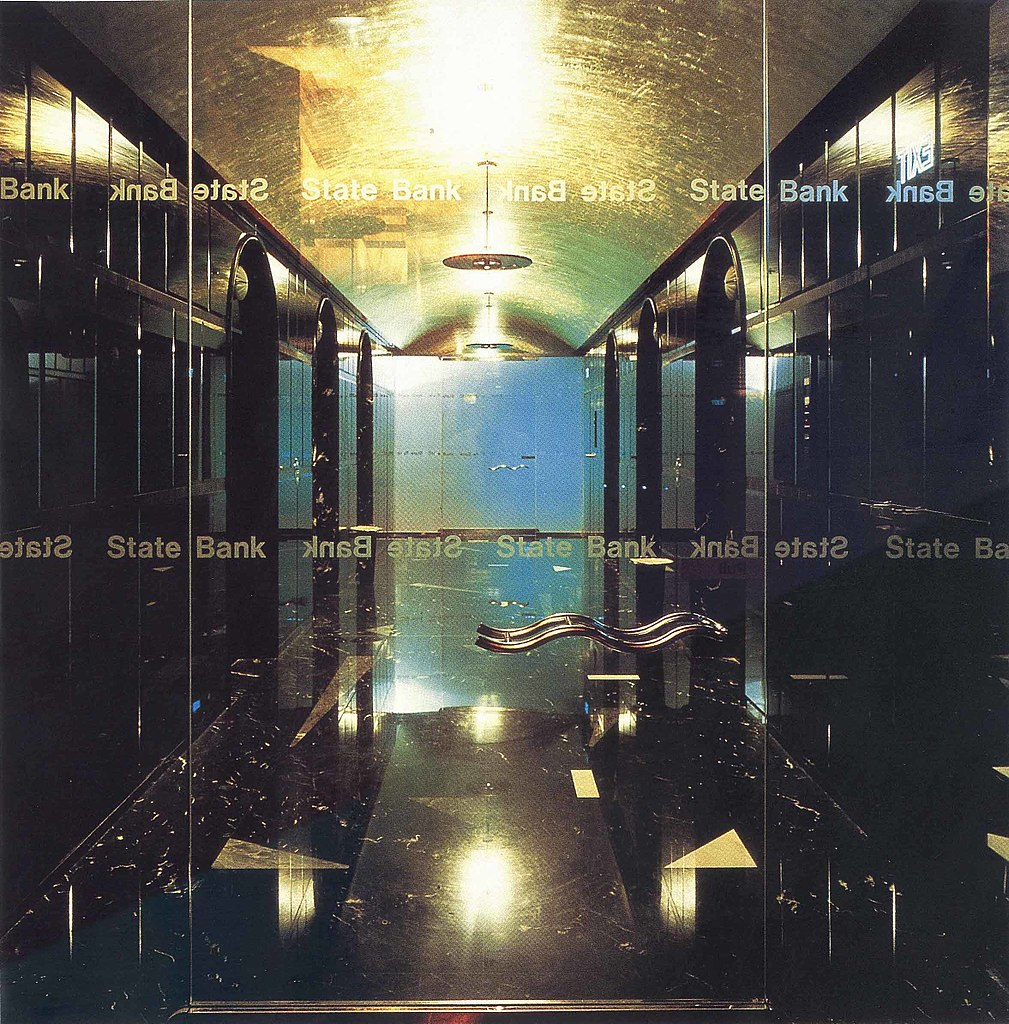
State Bank Foyer, Martin Place

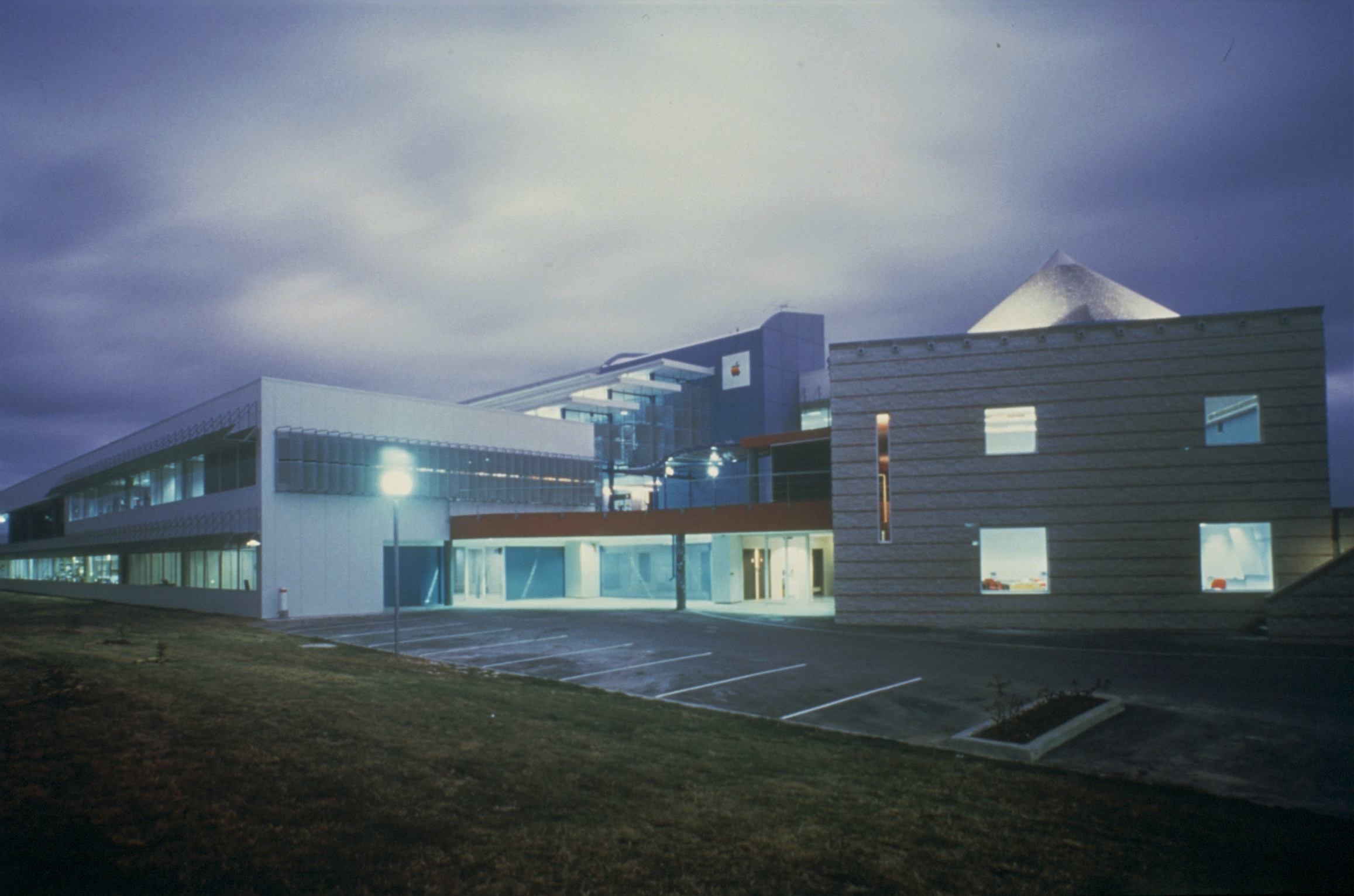
Apple Computer, Sydney

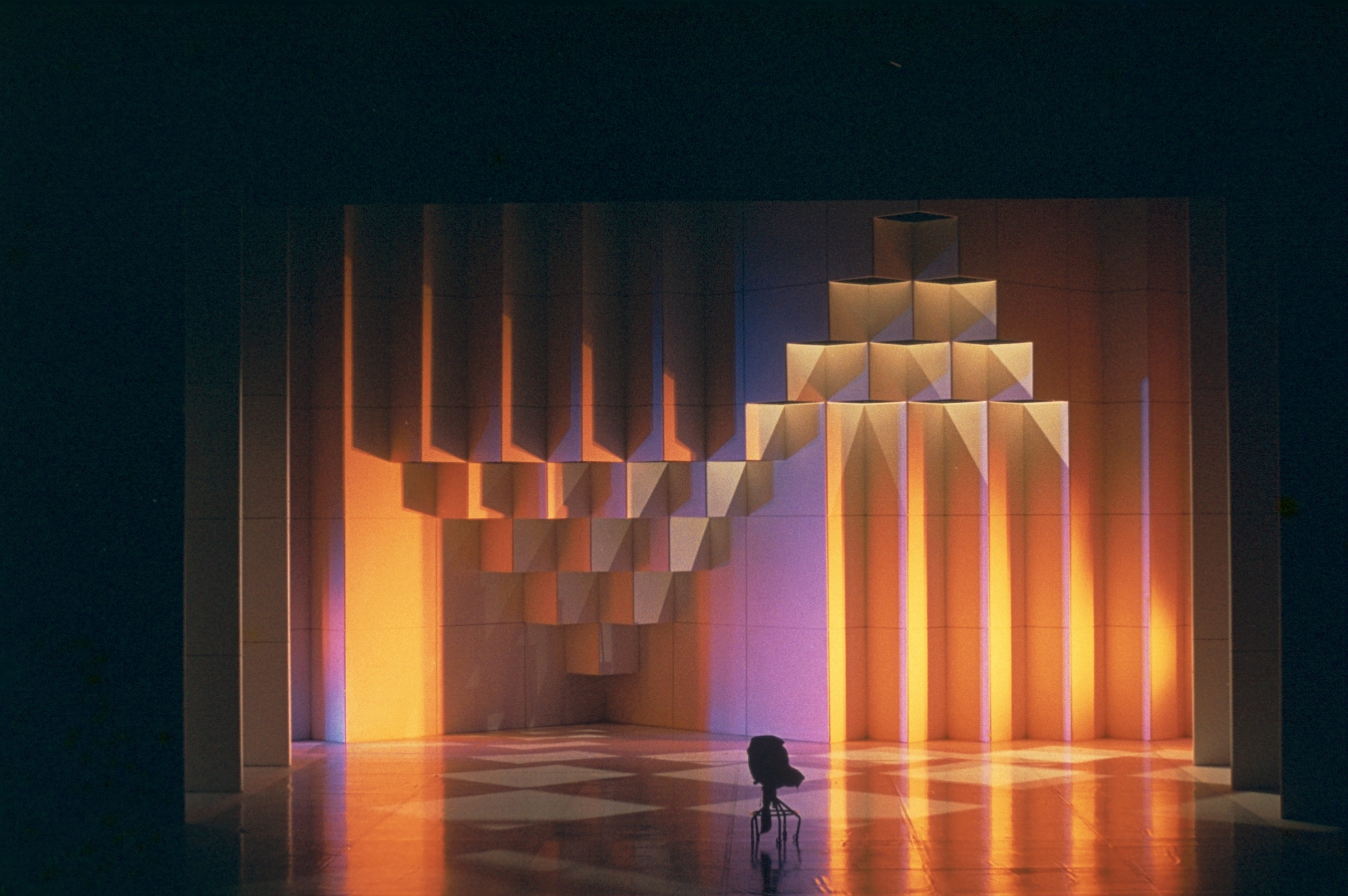
Kraanerg, Sydney Dance Company

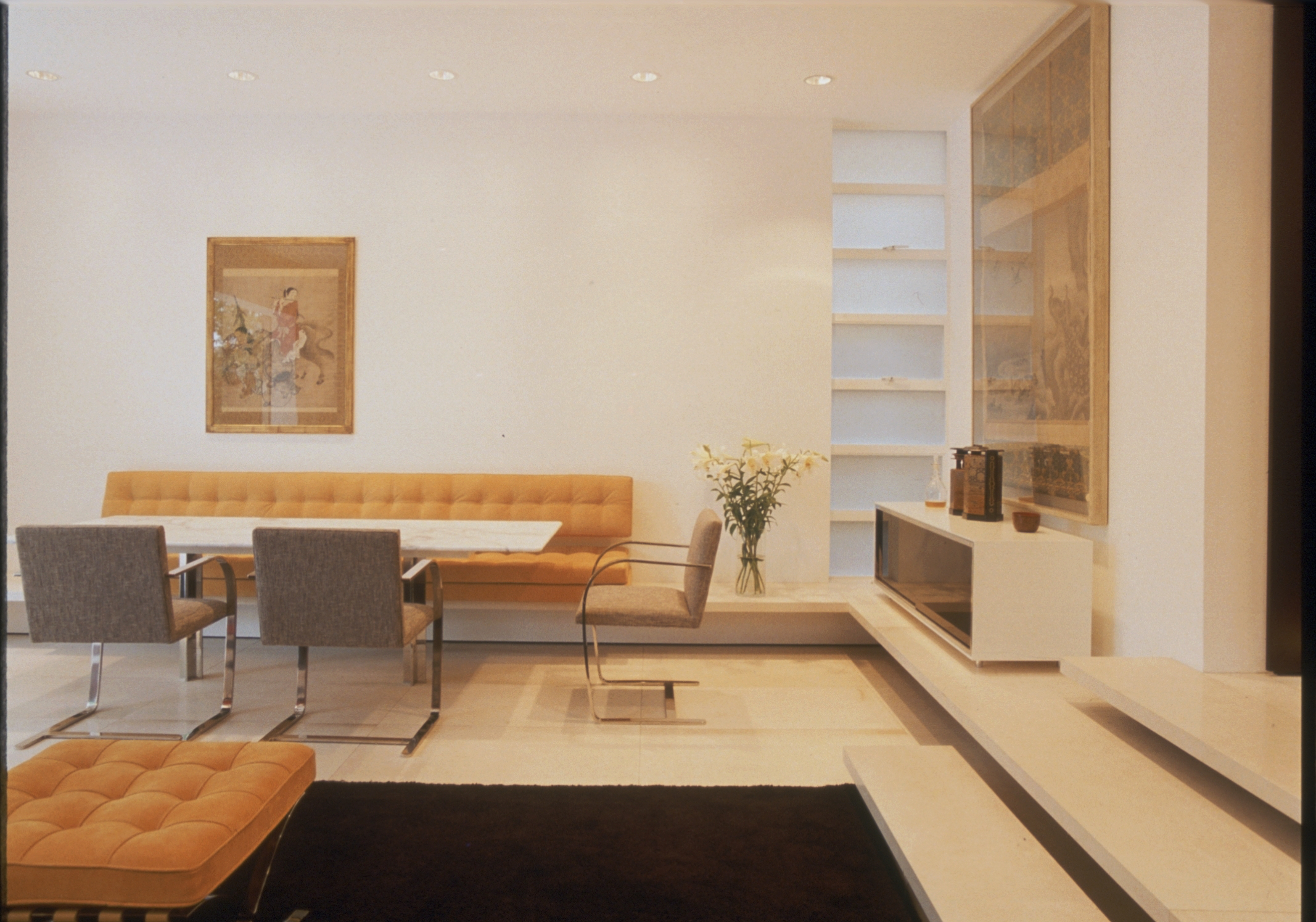
James Fairfax House, Sydney

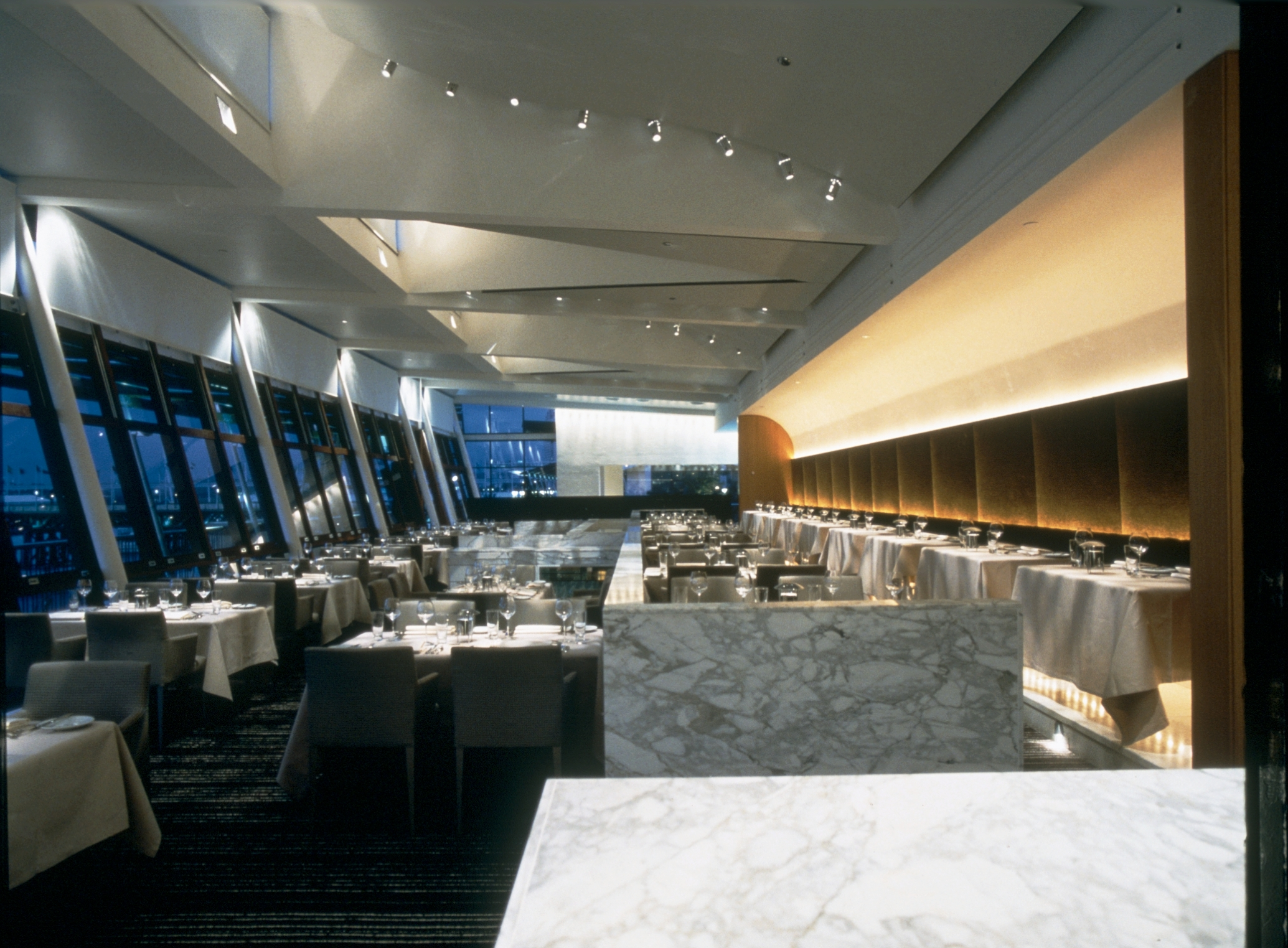
Ampersand, Sydney

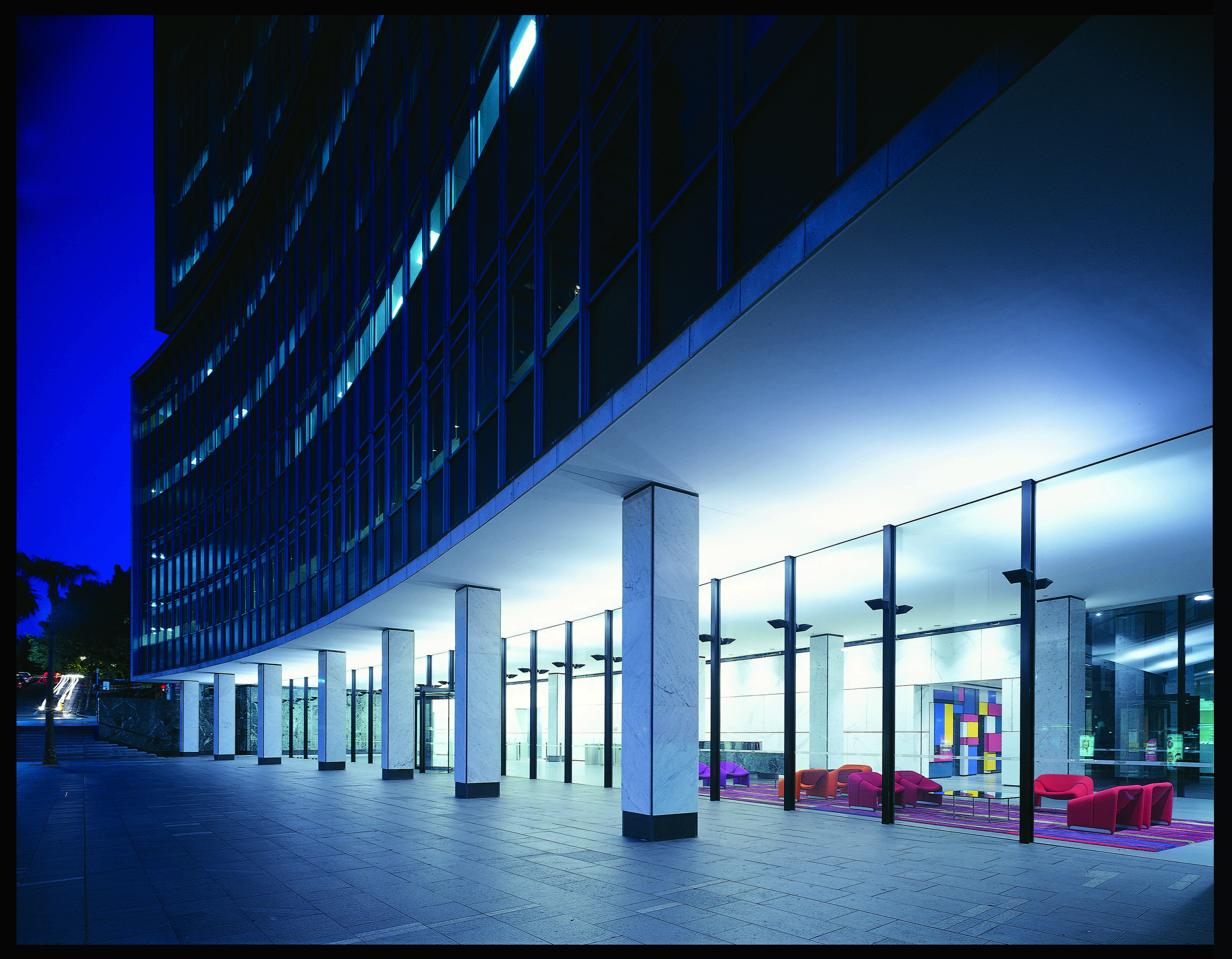
AMP Building, Circular Quay

== List of projects ==
- 1963 American Airlines First Class Lounge
- 1965 The Loose Box
- 1965–66 Bovril Group
- 1967 Beecham Pharmaceuticals
- 1968 Price Waterhouse offices
- 1968–1969 VIP hospitality suite in United States Pavilion for Osaka World's Fair 1970
- 1970 Bank of New South Wales
- 1971 Neville Marsh Interiors for Kim Bonython', in SIDA Rooms on View Exhibition Design
- 1972 Partnership Pacific headquarters
- 1973 Her Majesty's Theatre
- 1974 Hoyts Theatres
- 1978 Berger Vogue paint colours
- 1976 Berowra Waters Inn
- 1980 Five Ways Fusion
- 1981 Price Waterhouse
- 1982 Kinselas
- 1982 Alexandra
- 1982 Kempsey Museum and Tourist Centre
- 1982 Magnus Nankervis and Curl
- 1982 204 Clarence Street, Sydney
- 1983 Leighton House
- 1983 Order Imports
- 1983 Mayur at MLC Centre
- 1983 Kessel residence
- 1983 Nankervis residence
- 1984 Glo Glo's
- 1984 Taylor's
- 1985 Freedman Marsh Apartment
- 1986 Barrister's Chambers
- 1987 State Bank of New South Wales HQ
- 1987 Swift Apartment
- 1988 Powerhouse Museum
- 1985 Chez Oz
- 1986 Apple Computers Australian HQ
- 1986 Senso Unico
- 1987 Claude's restaurant
- 1987 Jarrett House
- 1988 Australian Pavilion, Expo 88
- 1988 Kraanerg'
- 1988 Bilson's (1)
- 1988 Luna Park redevelopment concept
- 1988 Sturkey Apartment
- 1988 Spry House
- 1989 Knoll showroom at Arredorama
- 1990 Grand Hotel Disco
- 1990 Staley Apartment
- 1990 Fairfax Residence
- 1990 Dani Marti Apartment
- 1990 Clean Living
- 1990 Immediate Health Care Offices
- 1990 Xmas tree & Wreath Designs
- 1991 Soft Bruising'
- 1991 Mercantile & General Reinsurance
- 1991 Pearl Beach House
- 1992 Wentworth & Selbourne Chambers – level 6
- 1992 Videotronics – Video Stores
- 1992 Smouha-Ho Residence
- 1993 Treasury at Intercontinental Hotel
- 1993 Penrith Panthers Leagues Club
- 1993 Macquarie Bank HQ
- 1994 Notaras Residence
- 1994 Peter Johnson
- 1994 Boonoke
- 1994 Kingsclere Apartments
- 1994 Centennial Park swimming pool area
- 1995 James Fairfax Residence
- 1995 Elizabeth Bay Apartment
- 1995 Wollahra General Practice
- 1996 Mirabelle
- 1996 Moran Residence
- 1997 Thomas Residence
- 1997 Berg Residence
- 1998 Tiger Lane
- 1999 Ampersand
- 1999 Pan Apartment(1)
- 2000 Miller Residence
- 2000 Mythologia'
- 2000 Thomas Residence (2)
- 2000 Halpern Residence
- 2001 Denton-Byrne Residence (Stage1)
- 2001 AMP HQ Executive offices and entry foyer
- 2001 AMP Offices
- 2001 Pan Penthouse (2)
- 2009 Queen Victoria Building
- 2003 Pan Residence (3)
- 2003 Pan Ranch (4)
- 2003 Bilson's (2)
- 2004 Medina Grand
- 2004 Spry House (2)
- 2004 PBL Holdings (Levels 2 and 4)
- 2005 Quay
- 2005 'Changing Spaces' exhibition at Elizabeth Bay House
- 2005 Double Bay House
- 2007 Leighton
- 2005 Adagio
- 2006 Sea Level Restaurant
- 2006 Mosman House "Easterly"
- 2006 Freedman Apartment
- 2007 Buon Ricordo
- 2007 Tiger Lane
- 2007 PBL Holdings (Ground Floor Foyer & Private Dining Room)
- 2007 Qualia resort
- 2007 Onslow apartments
- 2008 Residence – "Finisterre"
- 2009 Denton-Byrne Residence (Stage 2 )
- 2009 Elizabeth apartments
- 2012 Bondi Pacific apartments
- 2013 Redesign of de de ce Knoll showroom for Knoll 75th anniversary
- 2015 Bryan Apartment
