= Tetsuya's =

Coordinates: 33°52′31″S 151°12′18″E

- Interactive map of Tetsuya's

Restaurant information
- Head chef: Tetsuya Wakuda
- Location: Sydney, Australia

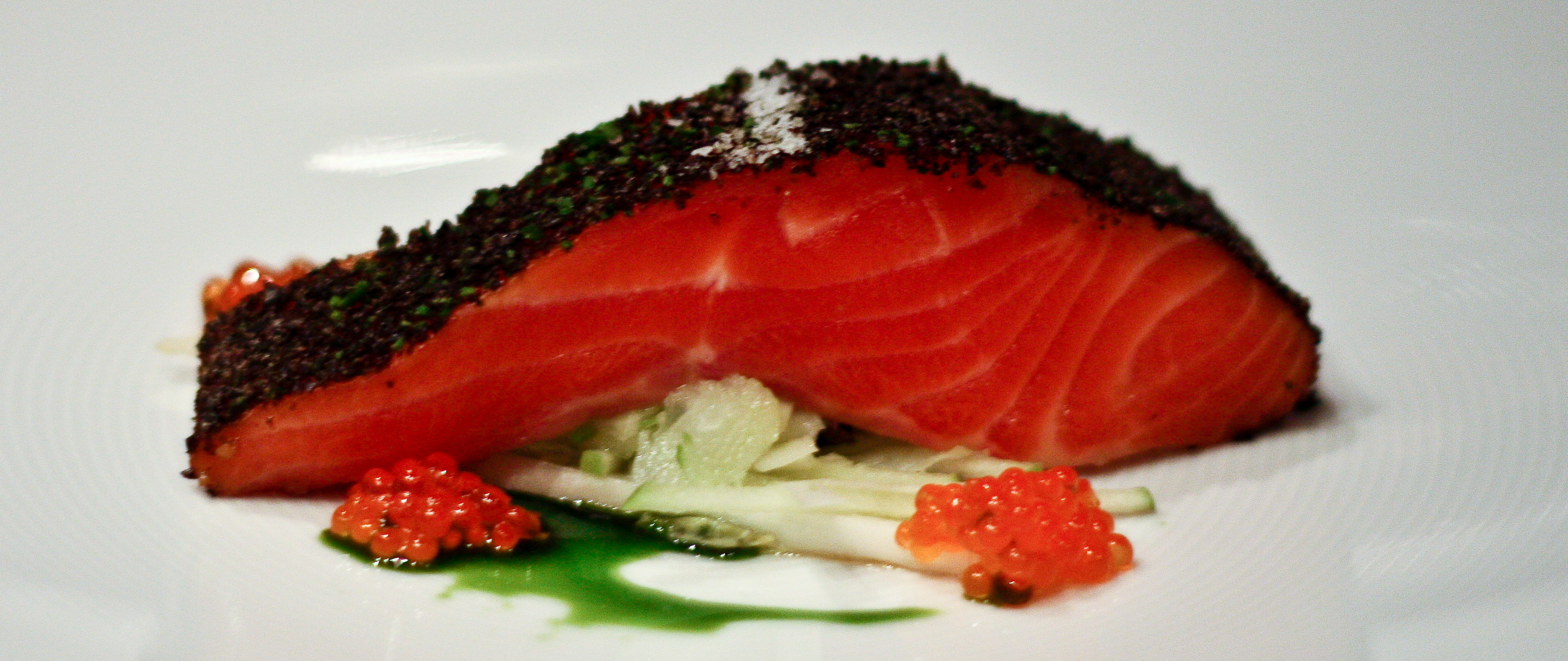
Tetsuya's signature dish, Confit of Tasmanian Ocean Trout

Tetsuya's was a restaurant in Sydney, Australia, which was owned and operated by chef Tetsuya Wakuda. Tetsuya's cuisine was based on Australian, Japanese and classic French cuisine, and made use of Australian ingredients. The restaurant was known for its signature dish, the Confit of Tasmanian Ocean Trout, and is referred to by Financial Review as "the world's most photographed dish," which had been offered since 1987. Tetsuya's, along with the French establishment Claude's, was credited with bringing a new style of fine dining to Sydney. The restaurant closed down in July 2024.

== Tetsuya Wakuda ==
Japanese-born Chef Tetsuya Wakuda's was trained in classic French cuisine and worked in various establishments in Tokyo, before moving overseas to live in Sydney. Chef Tetsuya fell in love with the city's culture and produce. He combined his traditional Japanese roots with contemporary Australian ingredients.

== Location ==
In the late 1980s and 1990s, Tetsuya's was located in a terrace house in the typical style of the Sydney inner-western suburb of Rozelle. In 2000, Tetsuya's moved to the former Suntory building in the Centre of Sydney.

== Style of cuisine ==
Tetsuya's served a set ten-course dégustation menu. American chef Charlie Trotter commended Tetsuya's unique approach to his technique and culinary philosophy.

== Influence ==
Several of Australia's top chefs have been trained at Tetsuya's, including Darren Robertson, Luke Powell, Martin Benn, and Dan Hong.

== Awards ==
- Restaurant S.Pellegrino World's 50 Best Restaurants in 2004, 2005, 2006, 2007, 2008, 2009, 2010, 2011 and 2012.
- Restaurant of the Year and Best Fine Dining at the Restaurant & Catering Association Awards 2005, 2006, 2007, 2008, 2009, 2010, 2011, 2012 and 2013.
- It was named The Sydney Morning Herald Good Food Guide's Restaurant of the Year for 2007.
- The Sydney Morning Herald Good Food Guide awarded it the highest possible achievement every year from 1992 until 2009; in 2010 it dropped to two hats out of three.
