= Claude's (restaurant) =

- Interactive map of Claude's

Restaurant information
- Established: 1976
- Closed: September 2013
- Location: 10 Oxford Street, Woollahra, Sydney, New South Wales, Australia
- Coordinates: 33.8887°S 151.2326°E
- Seating capacity: 30

Claude's was a French restaurant in Sydney that operated for 37 years until its closure in 2013. The iconic restaurant, which was originally opened by Claude Corne, was sold to a couple in 1981 who owned the business for approximately 12 years–Josephine and Damien Pignolet, a famous French-Australian chef. In 1993, Damien Pignolet sold the business to Tim Pak Poy, himself selling it in 2004 to a lawyer turned chef, Lee Luk. Luk was the chef and owner until Claude's closure in 2013.

Claude's became etched in the city's dining history and was deemed part of the formation of "Sydney's golden restaurant age" in an article by The Sydney Morning Herald.

== History ==
Based in Woollahra, the business was opened in 1976 by Claude Rene Corne (1928–2013) and his wife Nicole. At the time, there were few French restaurants in Sydney that offered a fine dining experience, which was already commonplace in other global cities like New York City. Claude's opened in what was previously a Spanish restaurant. Corne and his wife had immigrated from France to Australia in April 1970. He was appalled to discover a chef making a traditional French sauce "the wrong way", which in part led to him establishing the restaurant–a desirability to serve authentic French cuisine in Sydney, a new home for him and his wife, who would specialise in the entrées and desserts. Claude's was opened at a time in Sydney when the city's restaurant scene was still developing.

In 1981, the Cornes sold the restaurant to Damien and Josephine Pignolet. The Pignolets invested the business in Limoges, a George Freedman redesign and refined French food. Its then head chef Tim Pak Poy bought the restaurant in 1993, ultimately selling it to lawyer turned chef Chui Lee Luk, who had been working at Claude's since 2000 and would remain owner until Claude's closure in 2013.

Considered a "sacred culinary site", Claude's won much acclaim and many awards during its 37 year history. In 2015, it was re-opened as St. Claude's, serving a fusion of French and Asian cuisine, but closed in September 2019. From November 2019 the site was taken over by Vino & Spuntino, a traditional Italian restaurant.
