= Posthumous =

Posthumous may refer to:

- Posthumous award, an award, prize or medal granted after the recipient's death
- Posthumous publication, publishing of creative work after the author's death
- Posthumous (album), by Warne Marsh, 1987
- Posthumous (EP), by The Banner, 2001
- Posthumous (2014 film), an American-German romantic comedy
- Posthumous (2026 film), an Australian thriller film

== See also ==
- List of people known as the Posthumous
- Posthumus (surname)
- Postumus (disambiguation)
