= Postumus (disambiguation) =

Postumus (Marcus Cassianius Latinius Postumus, died 269) was a Roman usurper and founder of the Gallic Empire.

Postumus may also refer to:

- Agrippa Postumus (12 BC – 14 AD), son of Marcus Vipsanius Agrippa
- Postumus Junior (died 268), alleged son of the Gallic emperor
- Poenius Postumus (died 60/61 AD), prefect of II Legion Augusta at the time of Boudica’s revolt
- Postumus (praenomen), Roman praenomen

== See also ==
- Posthumous (disambiguation)
