= Diener =

Type of morgue worker

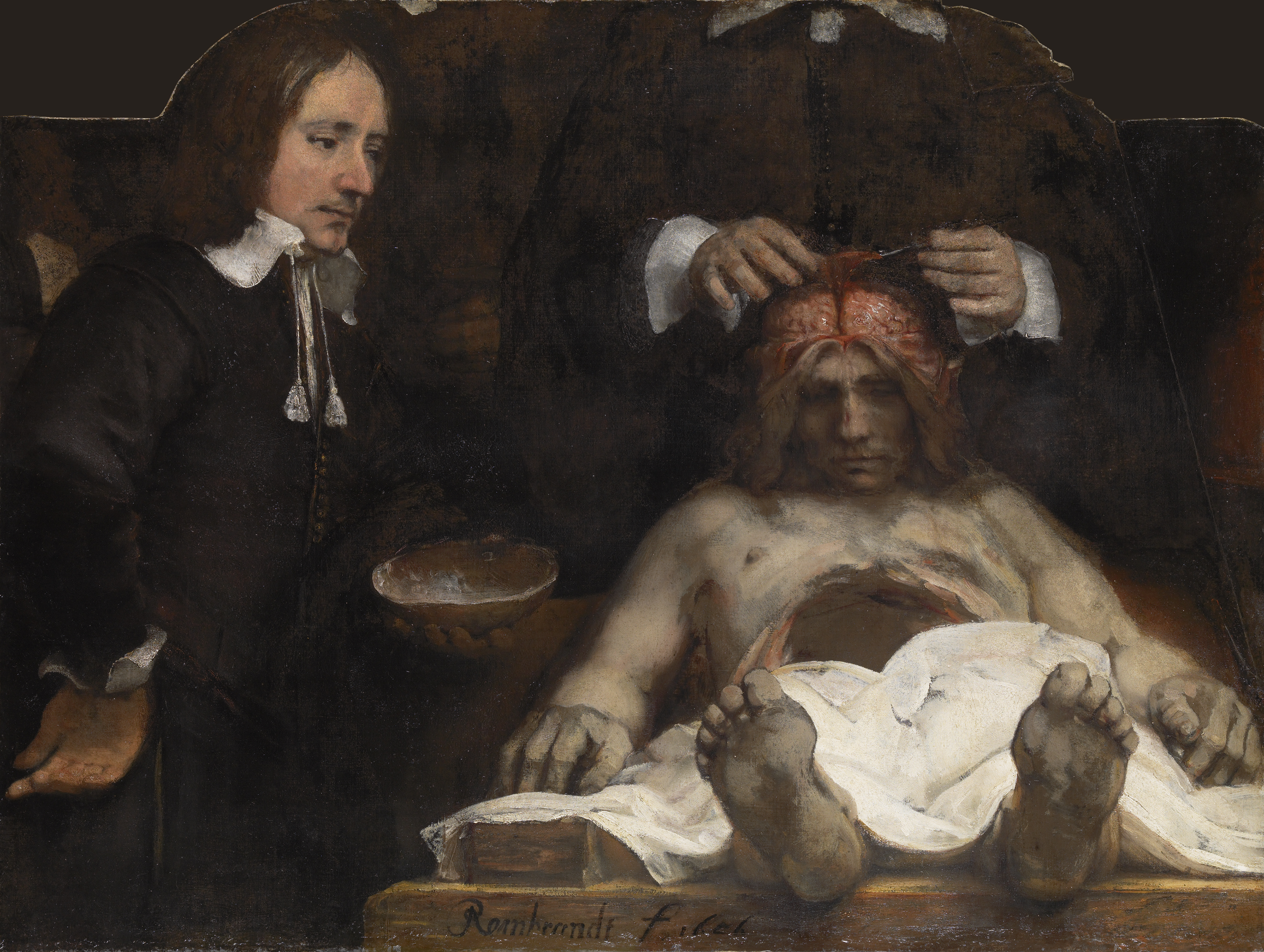
The autopsy assistant (diener) can be seen holding the removed skull top of the cadaver. (A fragment from Rembrandt's The Anatomy Lesson of Dr. Joan Deijman)

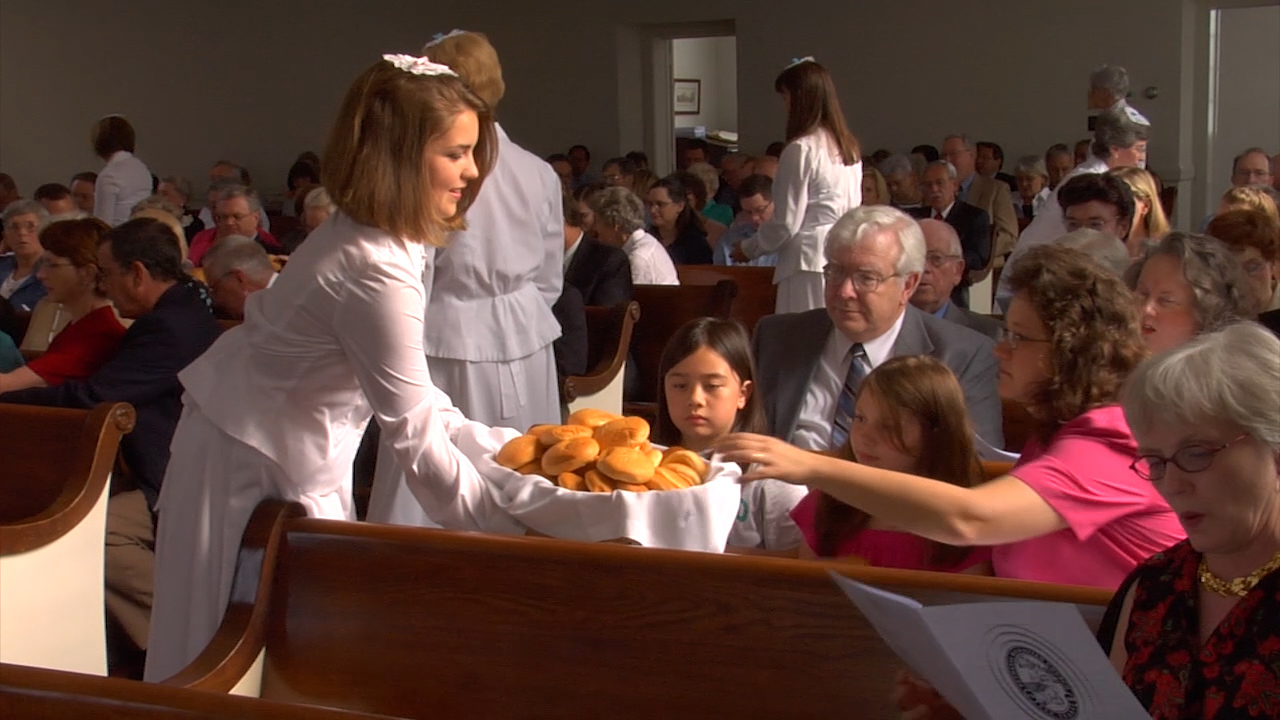
A Moravian Church diener serves bread to fellow members of her congregation during the celebration of a lovefeast.

A diener is a morgue worker responsible for handling, moving, and cleaning the corpse. In the UK, the equivalent job title is "mortuary assistant", whilst the preparation, evisceration and reconstruction of the deceased is performed by an anatomical pathology technician. In the US, dieners are also referred to as "mortuary assistants" or "autopsy technicians". The word is derived from the German word Leichendiener, which literally means corpse servant (diener means servant.).

A diener performs a number of tasks in medical schools and morgues. Helping a pathologist with examining and reconstructing cadavers are main tasks performed by a diener. A diener assists a pathologist or physician during an autopsy completing tasks such as handling tools and supplies cuting in to them and preparation of the deceased before and after autopsy. In addition to physical work with a pathologist and cadavers, dieners do work such as record keeping of identification and documentation of deceased in the form of items such as death certificates.

In the American Moravian Church (German: Herrnhuter Brüdergemeine), the men and (particularly) the women who assist in church services (like the Lovefeast) are called "dieners", from the German title for their office, Saaldiener or "chapel servant".

== Education ==
Education requirements for a diener includes a high school diploma or a GED certificate. Requirements also include completion of one year of undergraduate coursework composed of at least six semester hours in courses including biology, human anatomy, physiology, zoology, or criminal justice with laboratory work as well. Becoming a diener includes experience working as a laboratory assistant which involved use of surgical tools or human anatomy knowledge, instead of any undergraduate course work. Dieners can use their work experience to pursue a degree in similar fields such as forensics, clinical laboratory work, and law enforcement.

== Training ==
In the beginning stages of working as a diener, there are training requirements. Formal training requirements for a diener includes manual handling, infection control, and safety procedures. The training has two parts: Taught Units and Workplace Competency.

The first portion, Taught Units, consists of five sections.

- Human Anatomy and Physiology for Anatomical Pathology Technicians
- Governance and Administration of Mortuary Practices
- Health and Safety in the Mortuary
- Microbiology and Infection Control for Anatomical Pathology Technicians
- Principles of Effective Communication for Anatomical Pathology Technicians

The second portion of formal training, Workplace Competency, consists of five sections as well.

- Assist with Post Mortem Examinations
- Preparation and Operation of a Mortuary
- Prepare for Post Mortem Examinations
- Team Working
- Viewing of the Deceased

In addition to formal training, dieners learn how to do basic tasks through shadowing a mentor.

== Skills ==
Skills a diener needs includes physical strength, reasoning, problem solving, attention to detail, and stress tolerance. In addition to the above skills, integrity/honesty, visual identification, flexibility, and reading are other important skills a diener should possess.

Another skill is the ability to work with human remains, diagnostic tools, and surgical instruments involved in a death investigation. A diener is required to be knowledgeable of lab and safety techniques including the collection and preservation of evidence and any tasks involving any chemical, biological, microbiological, pathogenic and miscellaneous hazards.

== Places of employment ==
A diener can work in areas that include hospital mortuaries morgues and medical schools. When working in a medical school, a diener helps train medical students, interns, and residents on performing an autopsy. Dieners help train medical students, interns, and residents in autopsy techniques and procedures.

== Duties ==
The multiple duties of a diener are typically the same wherever employed.

One of the main duties is to assist in autopsies. One duty in assisting with autopsies includes positioning patients for them to be fingerprinted. Another task done as a part of assisting with autopsies involves the removal of organs, tissues, and any fluids (such as blood) from the body. Fingerprinting patients, removing tissues and organs, drawing and spinning blood samples are done as a part of collecting and preserving forensic evidence, which is a portion of the responsibilities for a diener. In autopsy assisting, a diener can collect and keep record of evidence relating to a patient’s death. Examples of collectible evidence includes any body tissues, slides, radiographs, and any on-scene evidence. A diener also performs tasks such as x-rays (body and dental) and developing and evaluating films from x-rays as a part of record keeping. The record keeping of evidence examined in an autopsy by a diener is used in the determination of the cause of death.

In addition to evidence collection and record keeping, a diener has the task of explaining the process of an autopsy in entirety to other employees, law enforcement, and others interested, such as family members of the dead.

A diener performs tasks such as checking inventory and placing orders for equipment and supplies regularly. In addition to performing inventory-related tasks, a diener will clean radiological and medical equipment, as well as inspecting equipment for any issues.

== Hazards ==
There are hazards involved with being a diener. There are approximately six types of hazards that a diener is at risk for: mechanical, sharp force, electrical, chemical, radiation, and infection.

Mechanical hazards categorize harm such as back injury from activity such as transporting cadavers. Sharp force hazards categorize any bodily harm from the use of tools and equipment such as scalpels and needles which resulting in cuts or punctures. Electrical hazards encompass any potential harm in the form of shock from the use of equipment like saws or defibrillators. Chemical hazards include harm from the use of a variety of chemicals used in the autopsy process such as cyanide and formaldehyde. Radiation hazards are related to any exposure from performing x-rays. Infection hazards are due to the potential that a cadaver is infected with a communicable disease.

=== Biological Hazards ===
Dieners are often exposed to blood and other bodily fluids, which can put them at substantially more risk for receiving a microbial infection than the general public. While most microorganisms do not survive for long after host death, dieners are at risk for pathogens that can remain infectious after death. The most relevant pathogens are bloodborne, due to the amount of body fluids that dieners work with during procedures. Examples include Hepatitis B and C, HIV, and agents of viral hemorrhagic fevers. Mycobacterium tuberculosis and transmissible spongiform encephalopathies also raise a threat for dieners.

Infection occurs most frequently through sharps injury, through needle stick or wound induced by contaminated objects. Blood splashes can create more blood contact with a worker's mucous membranes, and can also create aerosolized particles that could be inhaled or ingested. Work with saws or procedures that cause a quick and strong release of pressure can also create aerosols. Not having the appropriate equipment, safety procedures, or proper sanitation can lead to greater exposure. Lack of proper drainage, ventilation, lighting, and cadaver storage and transport also increases the risk of accumulating infectious material in the morgue.

=== Chemical Hazards ===
The most common chemical used by dieners is formaldehyde, or more commonly, formalin. Formalin is used for embalming tissue and preserving the body. Formaldehyde is a chemical hazard to workers dealing with it because It is a toxic chemical that can cause an immune system response in humans upon exposure due to causing DNA and tissue damage, disrupt the metabolism and cause severe lung irritation and damage. There are several routes of exposure, including inhalation via airborne vapors, direct contact with the skin and eyes, or ingestion. Formalin exposure involves both immediate effects, short-term effects, and long-term effects.

The immediate effects involve skin and eye irritation, and the short-term effects involve respiratory, ocular, and dermal inflammations as a sign of toxicity. Long-term effects include respiratory issues, changes in appetite. Since it is a hydrophilic compound, it can easily be ingested into the lungs, eyes, and gastrointestinal tract. Formaldehyde is also associated with nasal and lung cancer and The International Agency of Research on Cancer (IARC) identifies formaldehyde as a Group 1 carcinogenic to humans. Formaldehyde is also a physical hazard as it can easily be polymerized at room temperature to 65%-75% formaldehyde air mixture, which is easily flammable.

=== Electrical Hazards ===
Dieners and mortuary assistants face electrical hazards from cardiac medical devices and postmortem equipment. Approximately half of all Implantable Cardioverter-Defibrillators (ICDs) retain active tachycardia shock programming after a patient dies. When dieners cut ICD leads using metal dissection scissors rather than decoupling them with a torque wrench, it can trigger a 35-joule voltage discharge that can endanger the operator. This shock risk is further exacerbated when live generators are submerged in conductive liquids such as embalming fluids. Furthermore, portable electrical tools used in necropsy suites pose risks of fatal shock and electrocution if tools are improperly. Failure to inspect equipment insulation can energize conductive tool surfaces, resulting in fatal electric transfer to personnel during operation.

Additionally, thermal processing of deceased bodies with electrical implants is a risk. Pacemakers and defibrillators have lithium-ion batteries that explode when exposed to the extreme temperatures of crematoria and incinerators. These explosions cause extensive structural damage to retorts and expose facility staff to projectile and blast injuries. Despite the critical importance of preventing these explosions, device evaluations and manufacturer returns are rare with 44% of morticians disposing of explanted devices as medical waste. Controlling these electrical and blast hazards requires establishing standard operating procedures for routine deactivation, personal protective equipment like neoprene gloves, and verifying complete device removal prior to cremation.

=== Ergonomic Hazard ===
Working as a Morgue Worker might seem completely harmless and easy-going. However, studies show otherwise. Morgue Workers work in constant risk of ergonomic hazards. The work requires them to lift, handle, and carry bodies, which puts heavy strain on their joints, tendons, and discs. These risks increase dramatically in chance when the body is placed in an awkward position. Also, the workers have to constantly bend up and down, which can result in additional injuries to the lower back.

Handling bodies requires constant heavy manual labor and repetitive movements, which can only contribute to higher ergonomic risks. Unfortunately, the task of handling bodies drastically increases in risks during mass fatality events, such as the recent pandemic Covid-19. Having to move more bodies requires even more repetitive movements, which adds more strain and tension to joints and tendons. Also, a study found that not just the handling of the bodies caused risks, but the use of vibrating tools led to strains to the hand and arm. Preventative measures require use of lifting machines, which significantly relieves the stress and tension on the workers’ body. Also, better education on mobility and safety has been implemented more after Covid-19, which is still taught to new morgue workers. It is important to recognize the ergonomic hazards for the Morgue Workers, but also important to prevent more injuries from occurring.

=== Radiation Hazards ===
Dieners are typically exposed to radiation when conducting autopsies. Prolonged exposure to ionizing radiation such as x-rays are known to be connected to several health issues which can be grouped into deterministic (needing a threshold to be crossed) and stochastic (no threshold needed) effects. A common example of a stochastic effect is cancer and that of a deterministic effect is erythema, which occurs at about 3Gy.

Some other health risks are known to have some connection to radiation exposure, such as cardiovascular diseases like ischemic heart disease and myocardial infarction as well as strokes and a higher number of thyroid nodules relative to the general population. In the case of thyroid nodules, evidence shows that prolonged radiation exposure leads to more nodules. These nodules, though smaller than normal, often have features that make them more likely to be malignant. Alongside all the health issues mentioned above, constant radiation exposure can lead to inflammation in the brain, which could fester and lead to Alzheimer's disease later in life. These health risks are made even more concerning considering that health effects could take years to show or appear at the end of one's career.

=== Psychosocial Hazards ===
The psychological impact of being a morgue worker is often unacknowledged in occupational studies, but is common to see in that workplace. To be a diener is to be constantly exposed and handling deceased individuals, which can deeply affect a person's mental health over time.

The most common psychosocial hazard for morgue workers is traumatic exposure. To perform their job, they have to continuously come into contact with those who have suffered, which can lead to Secondary Traumatic Stress (STS)—indirect trauma that can occur from someone with direct trauma. The risk of infection in this field can add to their stress; workers can be exposed to viral infections that may have led to the patient's death or other hazardous conditions in their laboratory workspace. It’s shown that dieners who are exposed and working with deceased bodies, especially those who died from physically traumatic events, have often been shown to develop depression, anxiety, and other psychiatric disorders. These workers commonly have to dehumanize a deceased person's body to view them as a specimen to work on, rather than a person, which over time can cause emotional numbing inside and outside the workplace. Additionally, burnout rates are relatively common in this field compared to other jobs. A study done in Turkey showed that 14% of morticians are highly emotionally exhausted, 32.4% are highly depersonalized, and 76.1% reported having a low sense of personal achievement.

Individuals also report receiving stigma from their community for working in this field due to the social image of working with deceased people, such as losing friends and sometimes family members because of the fear or disgust of someone handling the dead.

== Promotion opportunities ==
A diener can be promoted to positions in the mortuary and forensic areas of practice. Dieners can advance to positions (such as a forensic morgue technician) and perform tasks of greater complexity and mainly works with a forensic pathologist, over a general pathologist. Dieners can be promoted to supervisory positions based upon the gaining of supervisory and administrative skills.

== Salary ==
The salary for a diener varies based upon education, experience, employer, and employment location (i.e., city or state of employment). The salary is typically between $25,000 and $38,000 annually.
