= Morgue =

Place for the storage of human corpses

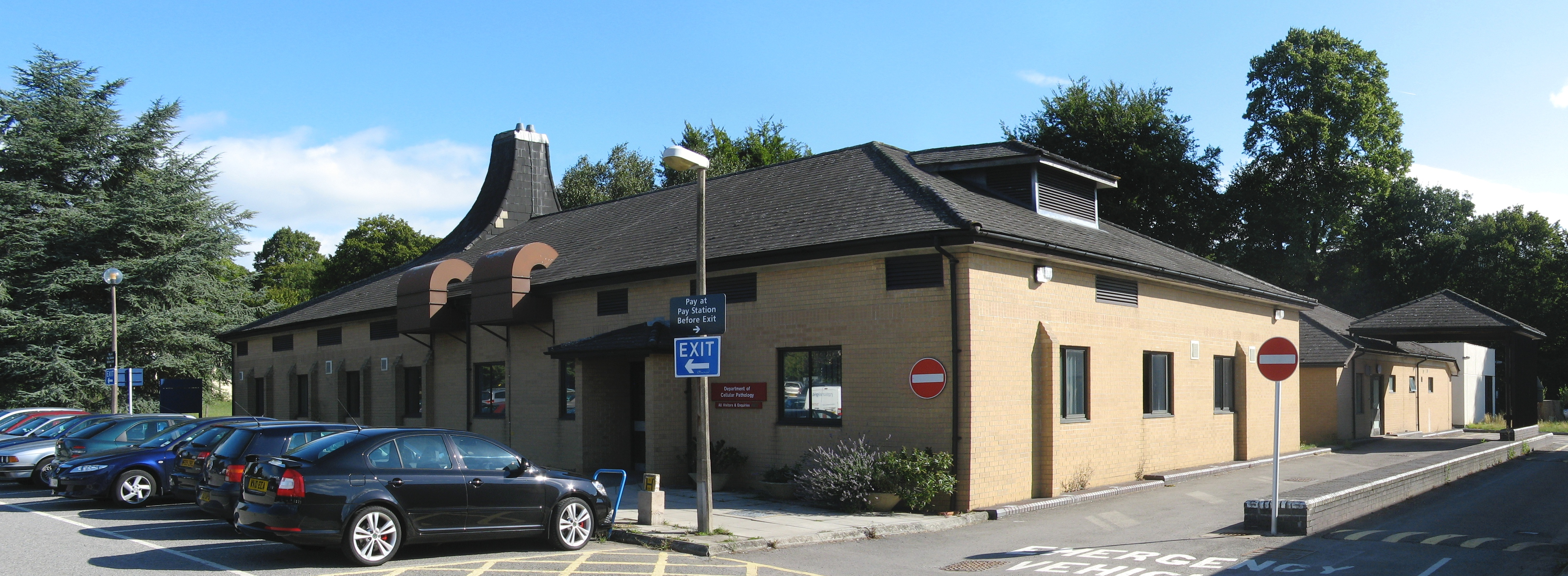
A hospital mortuary and pathology laboratory in Bath, England

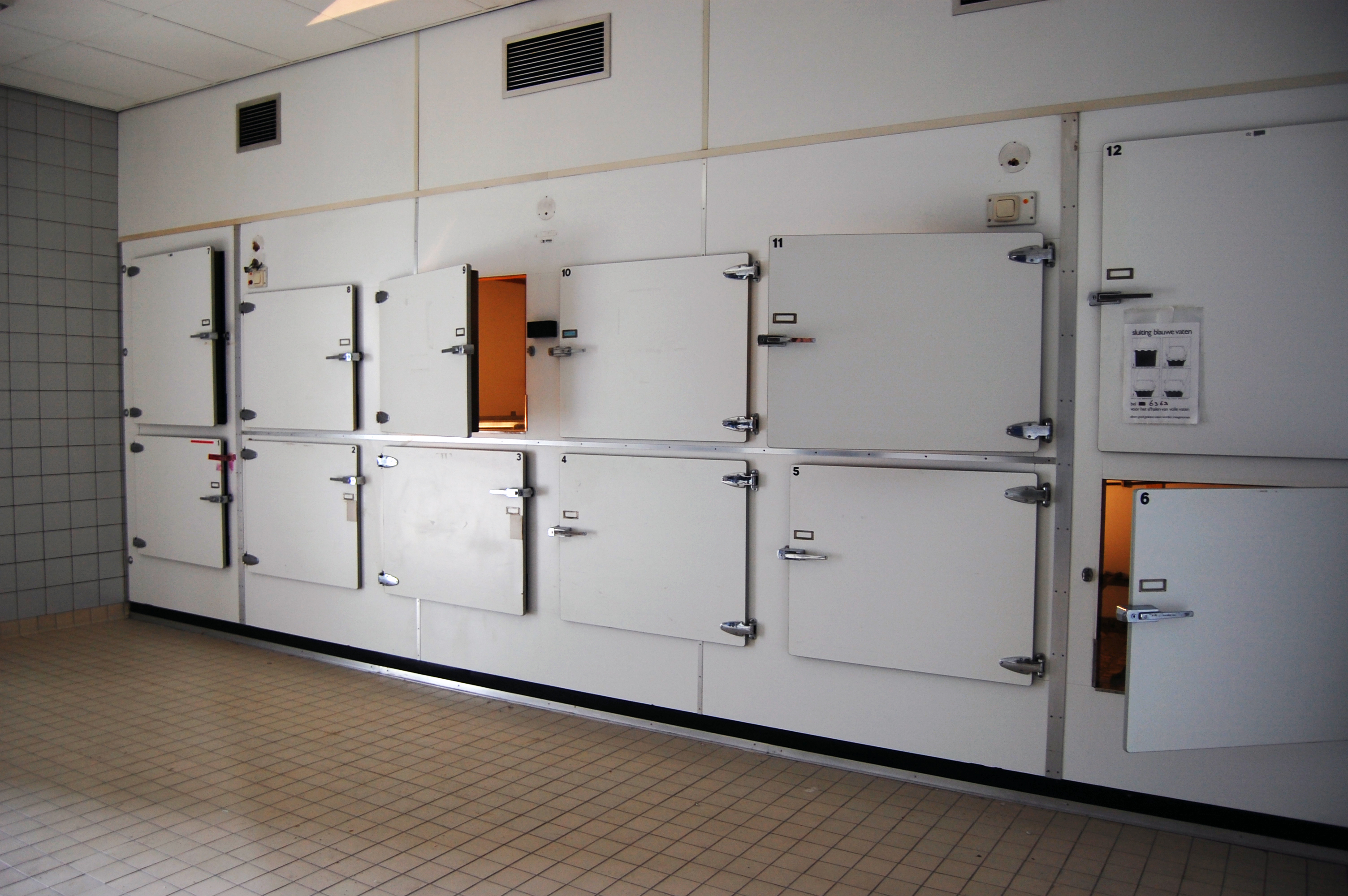
Inside view of an abandoned morgue in Deventer, Netherlands

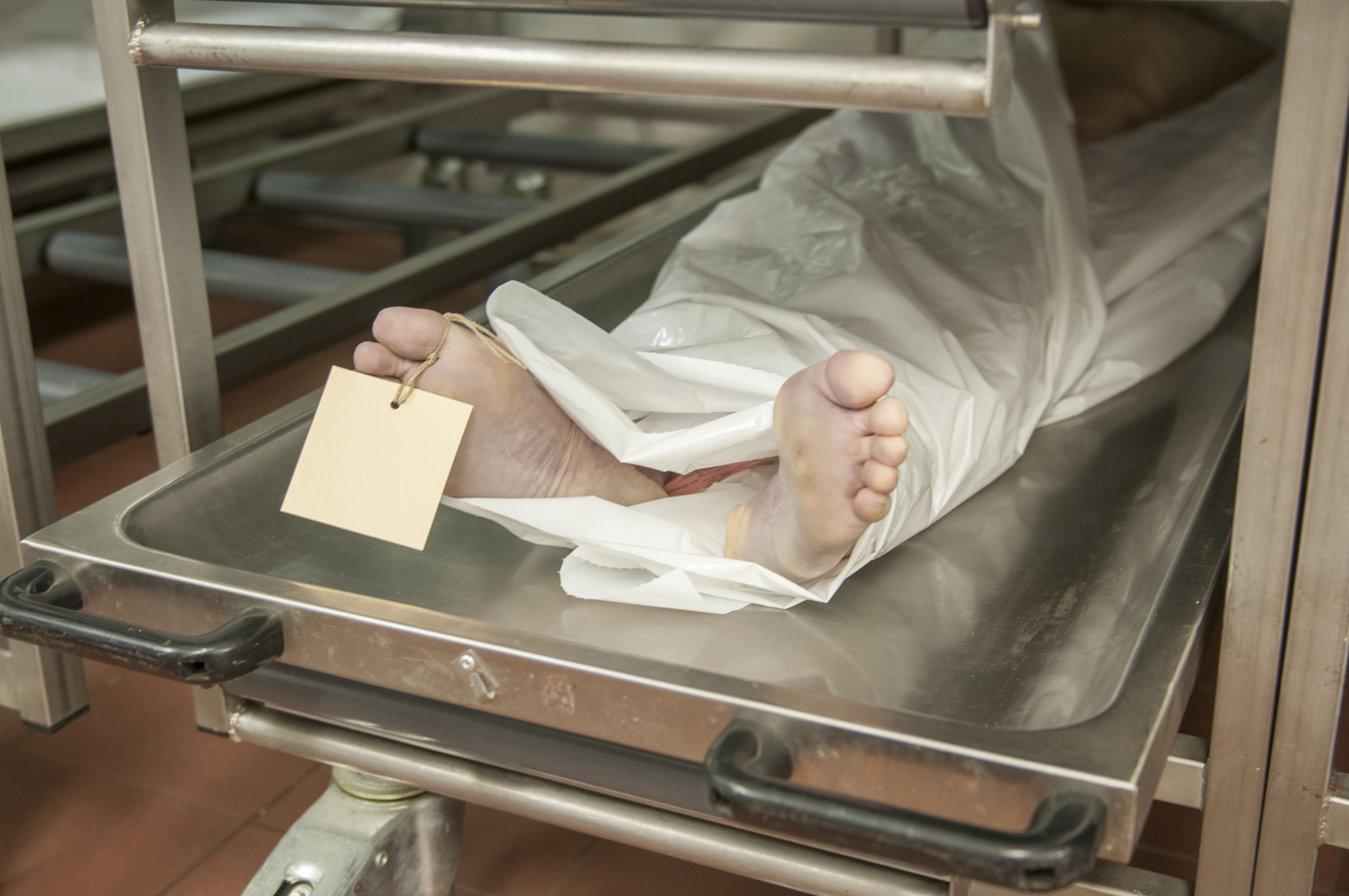
A body in the morgue in Charité

A morgue or mortuary (in a hospital or elsewhere) is a place used for the storage of human corpses awaiting identification (ID), removal for autopsy, burial, entombment or cremation. In modern times, corpses have customarily been refrigerated to delay decomposition.

== Etymology and lexicology ==
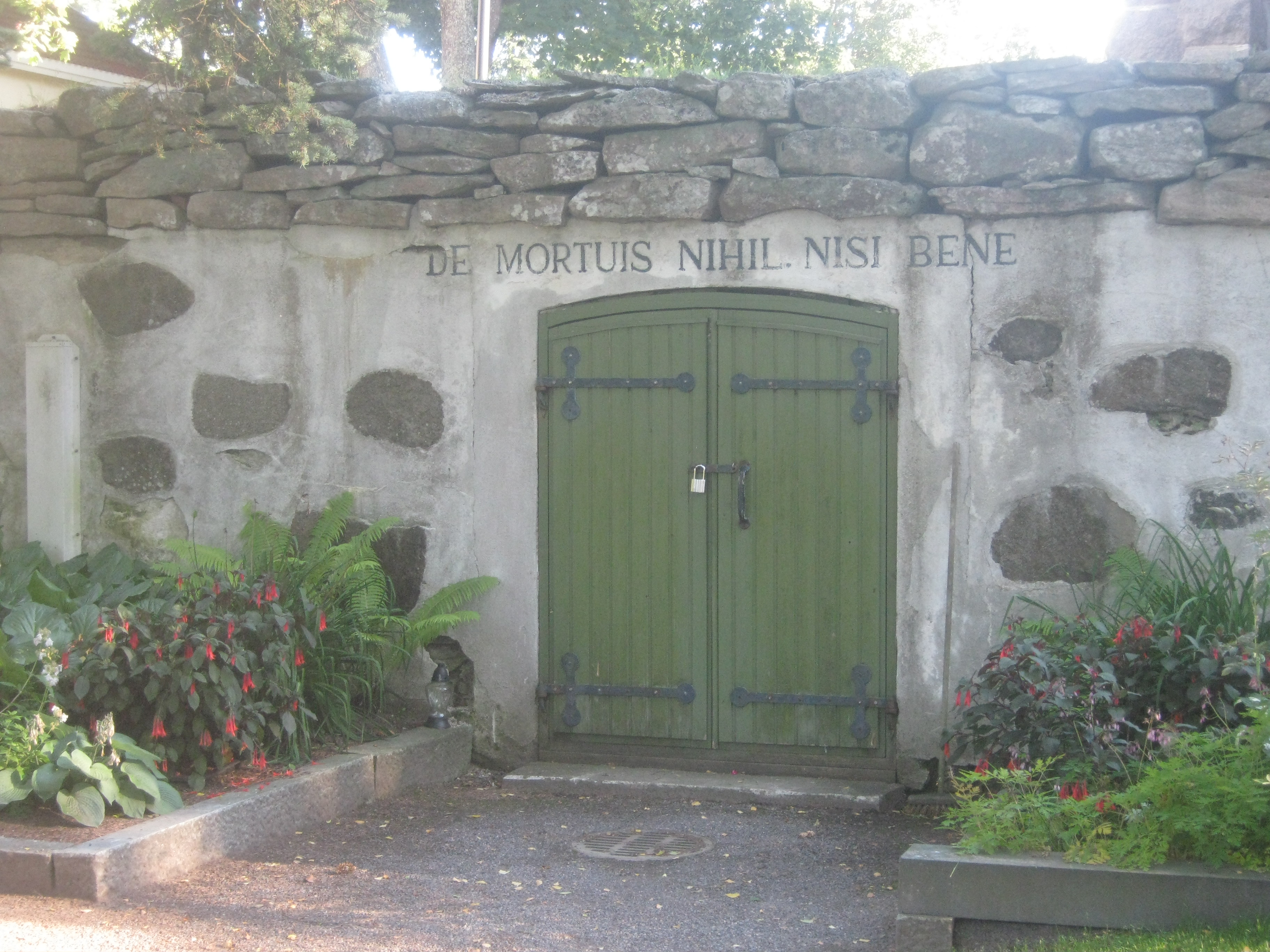
Latin phrase "de mortuis nihil nisi bene" ("Of the dead, say nothing but good") written at the old morgue of Eura Church in Eura, Finland

The term mortuary dates from the early 14th century, from Anglo-French mortuarie, meaning "gift to a parish priest from a deceased parishioner," from Medieval Latin mortuarium, noun use of neuter of Late Latin adjective mortuarius "pertaining to the dead," from Latin mortuus, pp. of mori "to die" (see mortal (adj.)). The meaning of "place where the deceased are kept temporarily" was first recorded in 1865, as a euphemism for the earlier English term "deadhouse".

The term morgue comes from the French. First used to describe the inner wicket of a prison, where new prisoners were kept so that jailers and turnkeys could recognize them in the future, it took on its modern meaning in fifteenth-century Paris, being used to describe part of the Châtelet used for the storage and identification of unknown corpses.

Morgue is predominantly used in North American English, while Mortuary is used in the U.K., although both terms are used interchangeably. The euphemisms “Rose Cottage” and “Rainbow’s End” are sometimes used in British hospitals to enable discussion in front of patients and visitors, the latter mainly for children.

An auxiliary person responsible for the care of the deceased is known as a mortuary assistant or diener. A person qualified in the evisceration and reconstruction of the deceased is called an Anatomical Pathology Technician in the UK, also called a mortician or autopsy technician in the USA.

== Types ==
There are two types of mortuary cold chambers:

Above freezing

Bodies are kept between 2 °C (36 °F) and 4 °C (39 °F). While this is usually used for keeping bodies for up to several weeks, it does not prevent decomposition, which continues at a slower rate than at room temperature.

Below freezing

Bodies are kept at between −10 °C (14 °F) and −50 °C (−58 °F). Usually used at forensic institutes, particularly when a body has not been identified. At these temperatures the body is completely frozen, and decomposition is significantly reduced, but not prevented.

== Around the globe ==
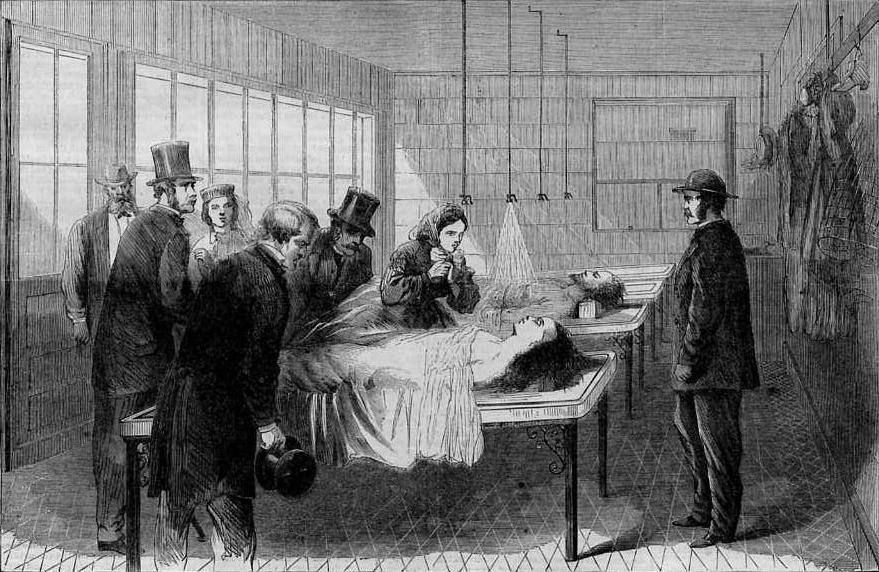
The first morgue in New York City, opened in 1866 at Bellevue Hospital

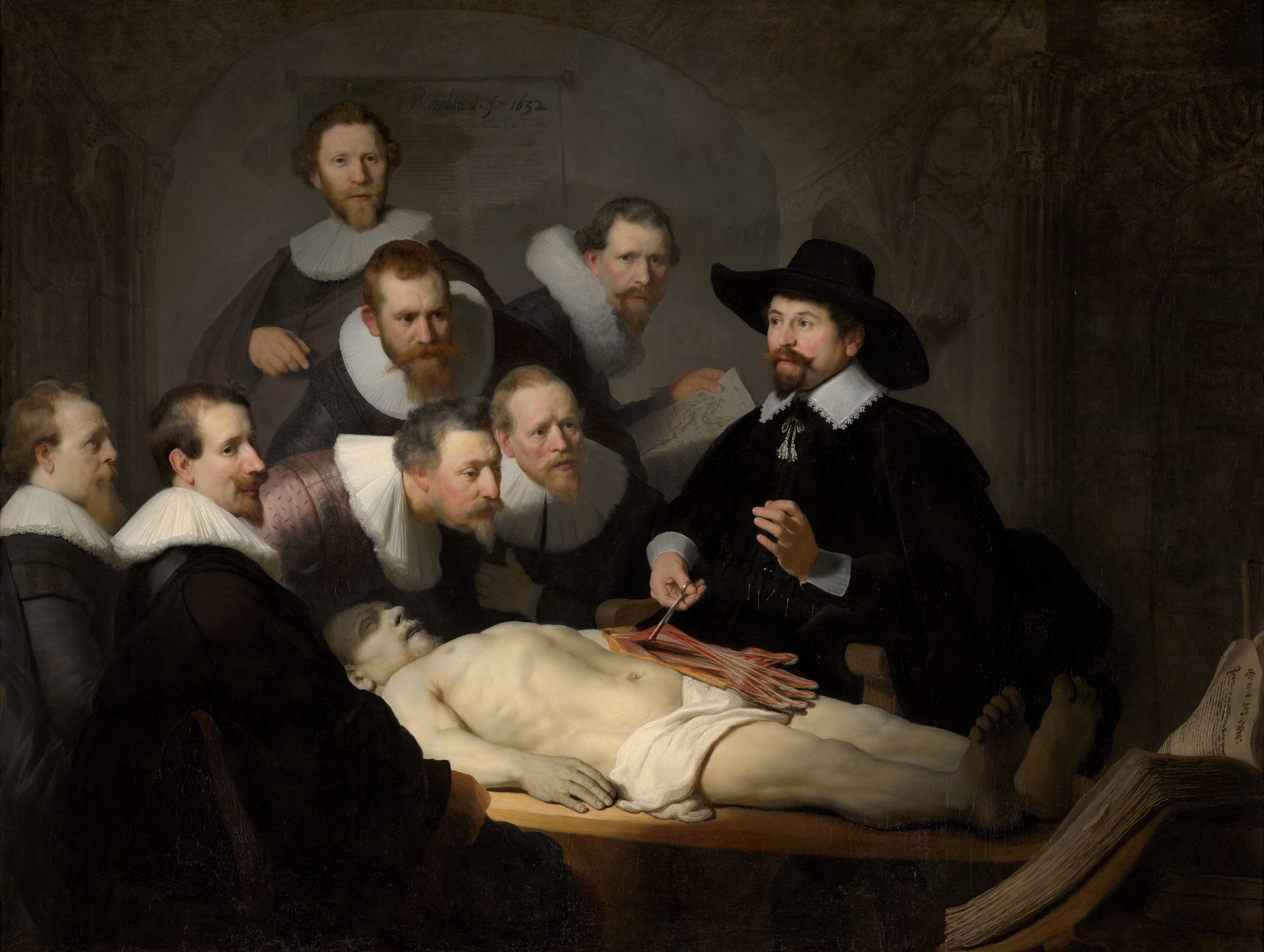
An autopsy is performed in the morgue. This painting was the Anatomy Lesson of Dr. Nicolaes Tulp

In some countries, the body of the deceased is embalmed before disposal, which makes refrigeration unnecessary.

In many countries, the family of the deceased must make the burial within 72 hours (three days) of death, but in some other countries it is usual that burial takes place some weeks or months after the death. This is why some corpses are kept as long as one or two years at a hospital or in a funeral home. When the family has enough money to organize the ceremony, the corpse is taken from the cold chamber for burial.

In some funeral homes, the morgue is in the same room, or directly adjacent to, the specially designed ovens, known as retorts, that are used in funerary cremation. Some religions dictate that, should a body be cremated, the family must witness its incineration. To honor these religious rites, many funeral homes install a viewing window, which allows the family to watch as the body is inserted into the retort. In this way, the family can honor their customs without entering the morgue.

Oversized mortuary fridge spaces have been installed in British hospitals to cope with the increase in obesity.

In the UK the NHS has asked health trusts to review mortuary access security and procedures in the wake of the David Fuller case in November 2021.

=== Waiting mortuary ===
A waiting mortuary is a mortuary building designed specifically for the purpose of confirming that deceased persons are truly deceased. Prior to the advent of modern methods of verifying death, people feared that they would be buried alive. To alleviate such fears, the recently deceased were housed for a time in waiting mortuaries, where attendants would watch for signs of life. The corpses would be allowed to decompose partially prior to burial. Waiting mortuaries were most popular in 19th-century Germany, and were often large, ornate halls.

A bell was strung to the corpses to alert attendants of any motion. Although there is no documented case of a person being saved from accidental burial in this way, it is sometimes erroneously believed that this was the origin of the phrase "saved by the bell", whilst in fact, the phrase originates from the sport of boxing.

=== Temporary morgues ===
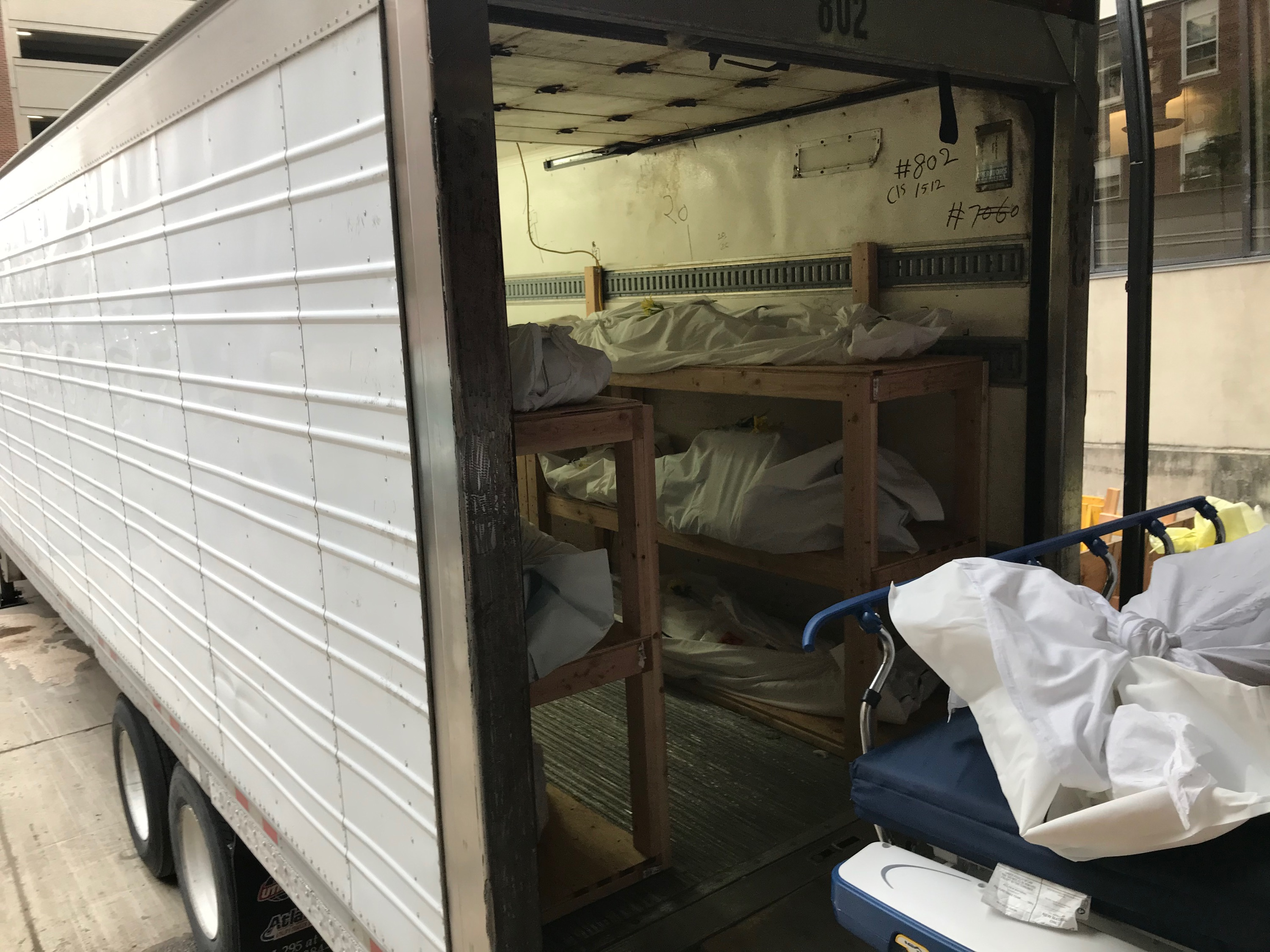
Deceased in a 53-foot 'mobile morgue' outside a hospital in Hackensack, New Jersey on April 27, 2020

In practice, local jurisdictions only support sufficient permanent morgue capacity to handle the usual number of fatalities from all causes expected to occur there over time. Prior to modern times and even sometimes today especially in poorer jurisdictions, in case of any incident causing many deaths in such a short period of time so as to overwhelm a locale's regular mortuary services the bodies would usually be disposed of as quickly as possible, and (often not withstanding the locale's usual customs) will be disposed of by whatever method is most convenient considering the supplies and equipment on hand.

In contrast, modern affluent jurisdictions will usually make every effort to requisition equipment and/or facilities not normally used to store corpses to act as temporary morgues whenever necessary. In theory, any refrigerated space spacious enough to fit a person can act as a temporary morgue in such a situation. In practice, government emergency preparedness procedures usually designate suitable public facilities such as ice rinks to act as morgues if available. Alternatively, refrigerator trucks are sometimes used as morgues, the advantage being that they are usually readily available and can easily be transported to where they are needed, thus sparing the burden of otherwise having to quickly transport large numbers of corpses over great distances.

While temporary morgues are usually set up for isolated local incidents, the COVID-19 pandemic resulted in numerous temporary morgues being set up across the planet.

== See also ==
- Body bag
- Diener
- Funeral home
- Pathology
- Tissue digestion
- Toe tag
- Body farm
