= Body bag =

Bag designed to contain a human body

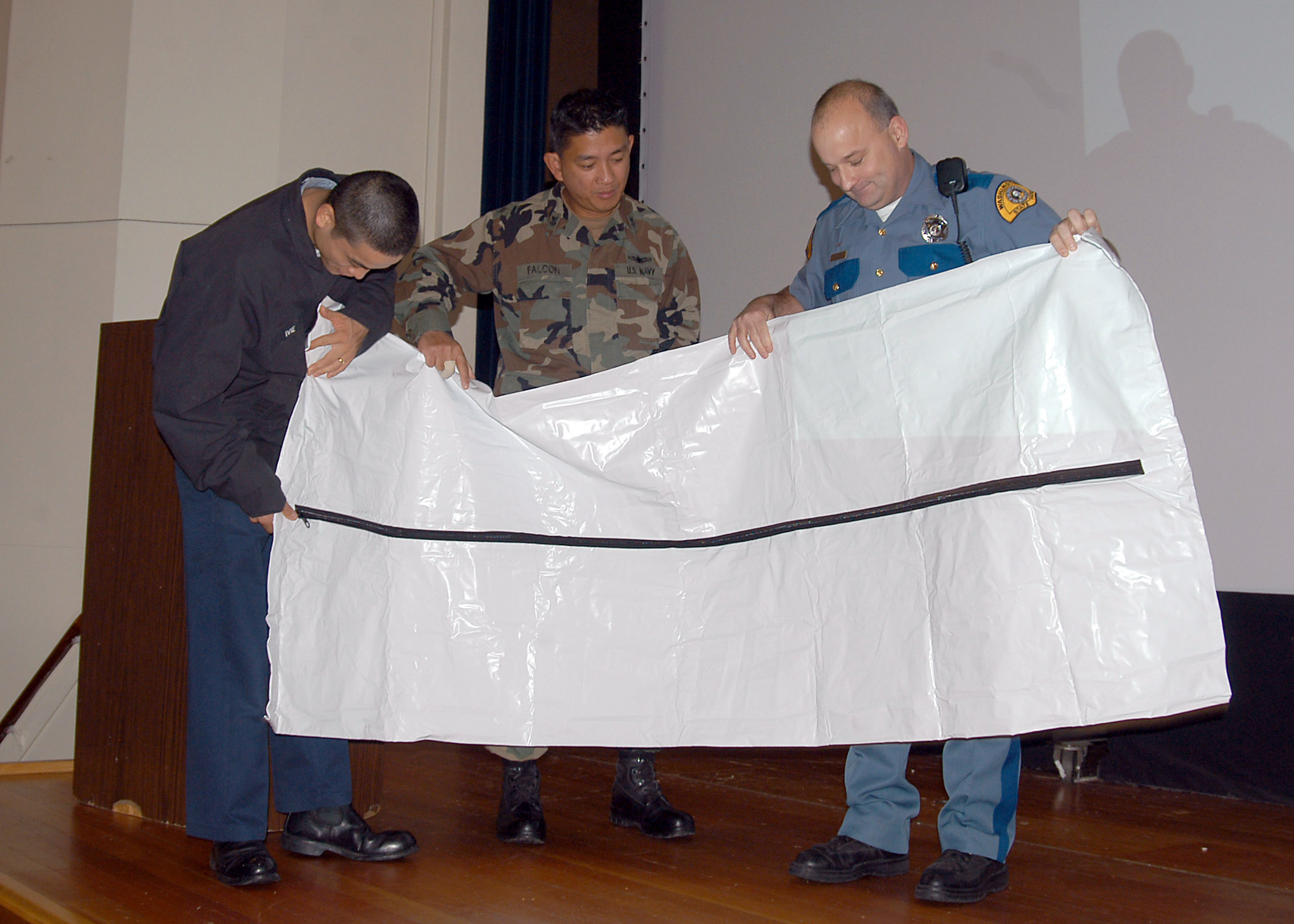
A body bag being folded by some policemen and sailors in 2006.

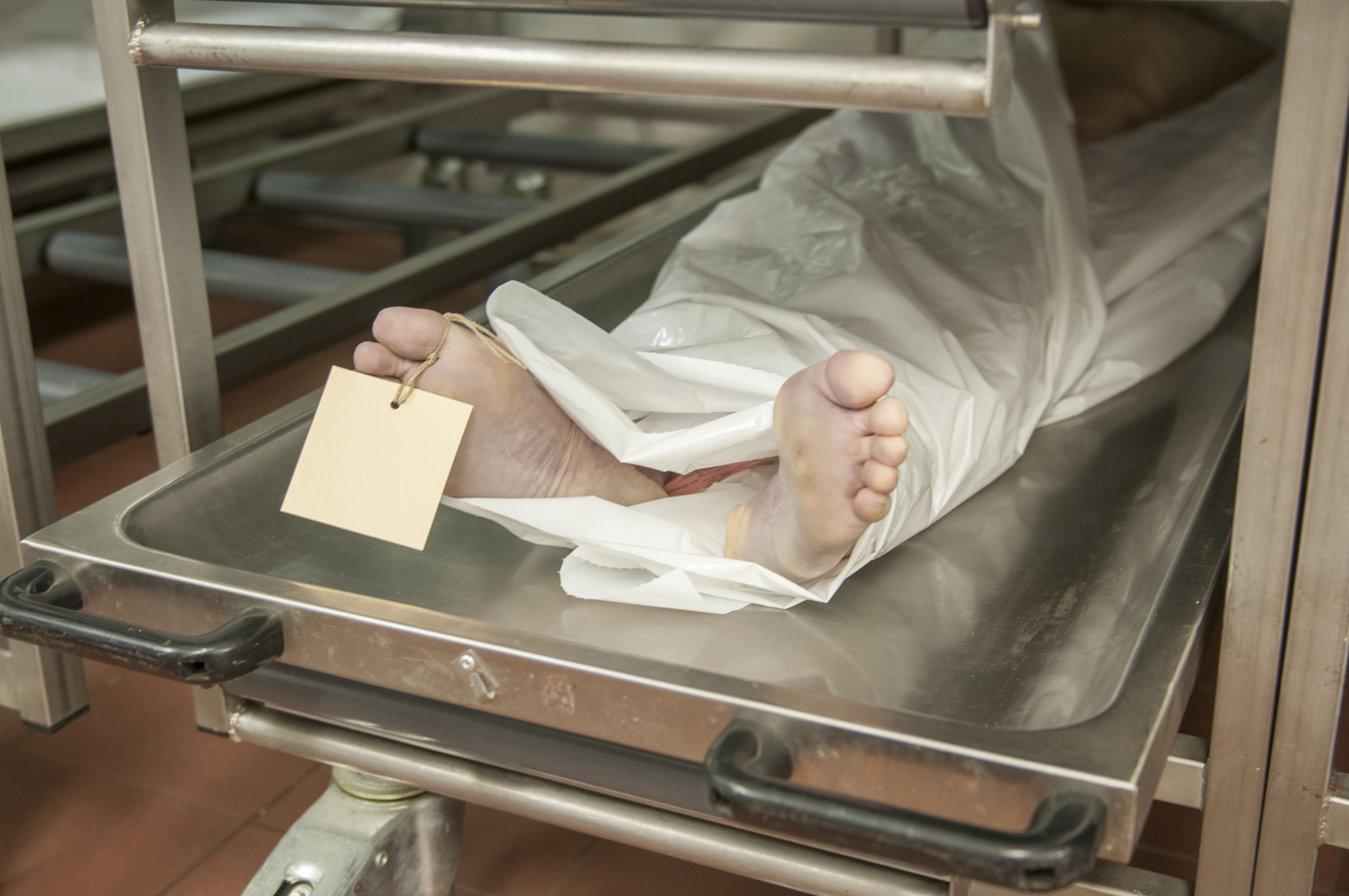
A body bag in the morgue of the Charité in Berlin, Germany.

A body bag, also known as a cadaver pouch or human remains pouch (HRP), is a non-porous bag designed to contain a human body, used for the storage and transportation of shrouded corpses.

== History ==
In the United States, the apparent first documented bag for the purpose of transporting bodies was patented under the name "Improvement in Receptacles for Dead Bodies." The patent was filed during the Civil War by Dr. Thomas Holmes, United States Patent No. 39, 291. The purpose of the bag, as stated in the patent application dated July 21, 1863 was, "... to facilitate the carrying of badly-wounded dead bodies hurriedly away that could not otherwise be quickly removed for the want of proper conveyances, or difficulty to procure boxes or coffins for removing the dead, as the boxes or coffins cannot be so easily transported or handled on the field of battle." He said that he'd "invented a new and useful Elastic and Deodorizing Receptacle."

== Uses ==
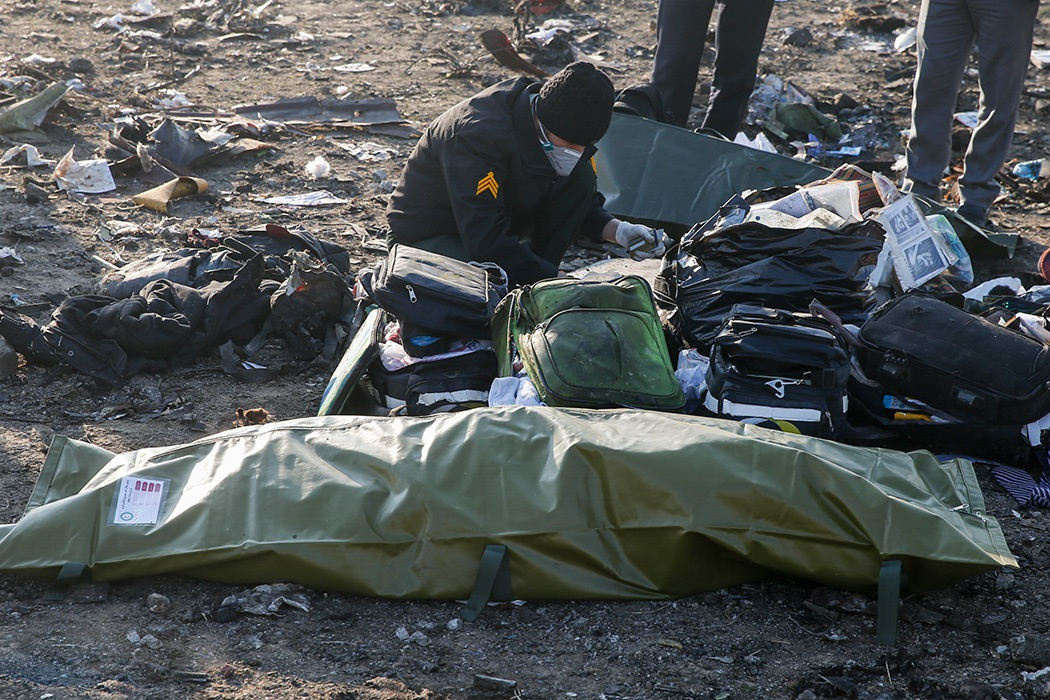
Body bag (Ukraine International Airlines Flight 752, 2020)

Body bags can also be used for the storage of corpses within morgues. Before purpose-made body bags were available, cotton mattress covers were sometimes used, particularly in combat zones during the Second World War. If not available, other materials were used such as bed sheets, blankets, shelter halves, ponchos, sleeping bag covers, tablecloths, curtains, parachute canopies, tarpaulins, or discarded canvas—"sealed in a blanket"—slang. However, the subsequent rubber (and now plastic) body bag designs are much superior, not least because they prevent leakage of body fluids, which often occurs after death. The dimensions of a body bag are generally around 36 inches by 90 inches (91 cm by 229 cm). Most have some form of carrying handles, usually webbing, at each corner and along the edges.

In modern warfare, body bags have been used to contain the bodies of dead soldiers. Disaster agencies typically have reserves of body bags, both for anticipated wars and natural disasters. During the Cold War, vast reserves of body bags were built up in anticipation of millions of fatalities from nuclear war. This was the subject of Adrian Mitchell's protest poem "Fifteen Million Plastic Bags".

Body bags are sometimes portrayed in films and television as being made of a heavy black plastic. Lightweight white body bags have since become popular because it is much easier to spot a piece of evidence that may have been jostled from the body in transit on a white background than on a black background. Even so, black body bags are still in general use. Other typical colors include orange, blue, or gray. Body bags used in the Vietnam War were heavy-duty black rubberized fabric. Regardless of their color, body bags are made of thick plastic and have a full-length zipper on them. Sometimes the zipper runs straight down the middle. Alternatively, the path of the zipper may be J-shaped or D-shaped. Depending on the design, there are sometimes handles (two on each side) to facilitate lifting. It is possible to write information on the plastic surface of a body bag using a marker pen, and this often happens—either in situ (particularly when many bodies are being collected) or at the mortuary, before being stored in refrigerated cabinets. Alternatively, some designs of body bags have transparent label pockets as an integral part of the design, into which a name-card can be inserted. In any case, a conventional toe tag can easily be tied to one of the lifting handles if required or used to bind two zippers to show a lack of tampering. Body bags are not designed to be washed and re-used. Aside from the obvious hygiene concerns, re-use of body bags could easily contaminate evidence in the case of a suspicious death. As a result, body bags are routinely discarded and incinerated after one use.

Although body bags are most often used for the transport of human remains from their place of discovery to a funeral home or mortuary, they can also be used for temporary burials such as in a combat zone. In such situations, proper funerals are impossible because of imminent enemy attack. This was the situation during the Falklands War of 1982, during which British dead were placed in gray plastic body bags and then laid in mass graves. Some months after the conflict ended, all remains were exhumed from their temporary graves to receive a conventional funeral service with full military honors.

During the Iraq and Afghanistan wars in the mid-2000s the military began using body bags as a rapid means of delivering ammunition, supplies, batteries, rations, water cans, and other items to small units in the field. The body bags with less than 100 pounds of supplies were loaded in helicopters. Upon landing they were quickly shoved out the doors and troops on the ground grabbed the carrying handles and dragged them to cover as the helicopters departed.

== See also ==
- Crematorium
- Coffin
- Columbarium
- Funeral home
- Mausoleum
- Shroud
- Tomb
- Urn
