= Toe tag =

Identification tag of a dead person in a morgue

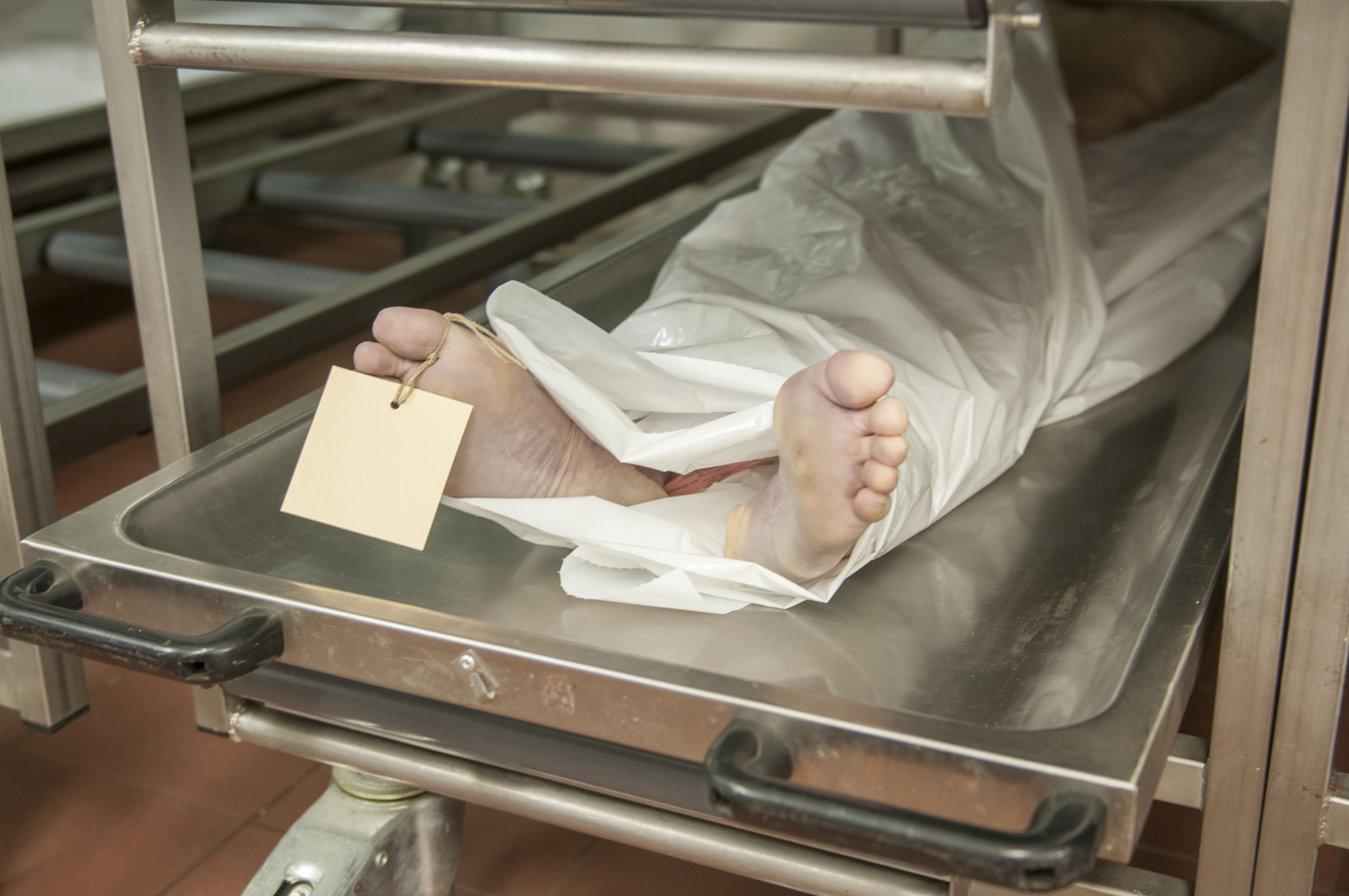
A toe tag on the corpse of the deceased in the morgue of the Charité.

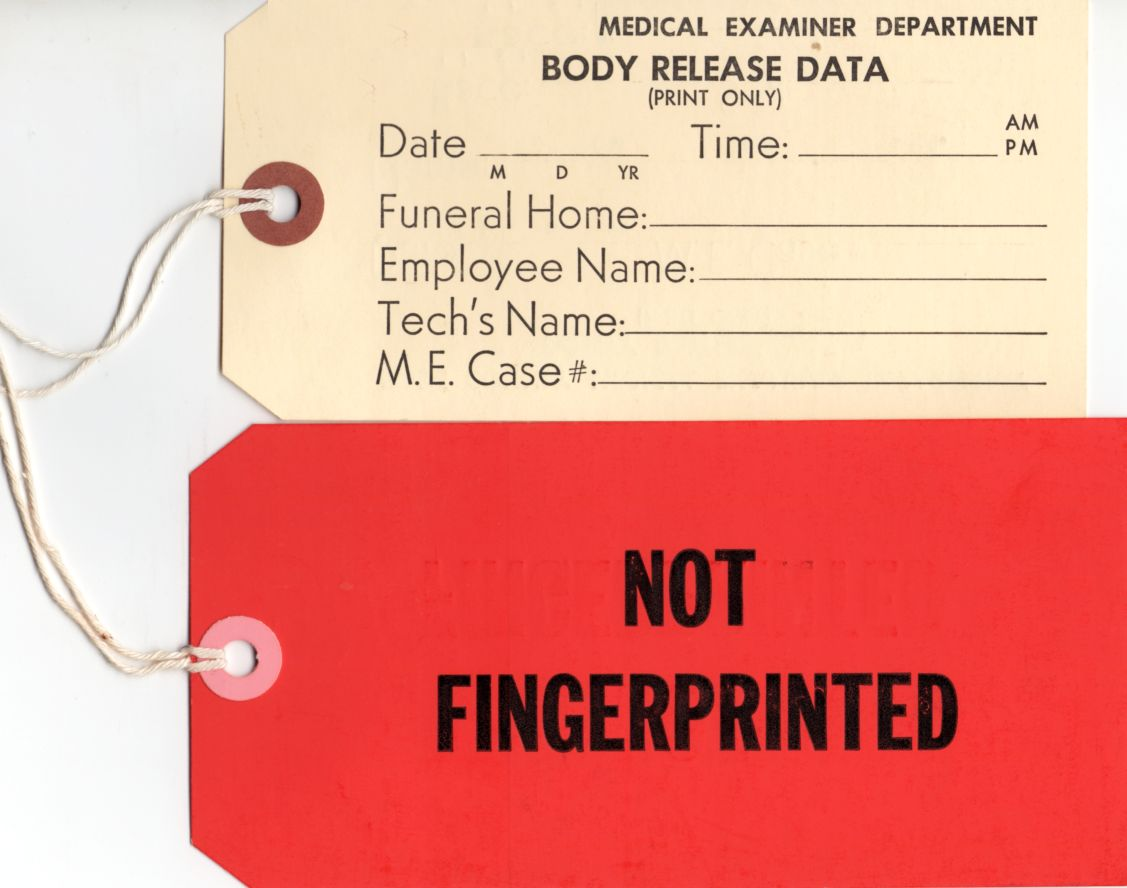
An empty toe tag.

A toe tag is a piece of cardboard attached with string to the big toe of a deceased individual in a morgue. It is used for identification purposes, allowing the mortician, coroner, law enforcement, and others involved in the death process to correctly identify the corpse.

It usually bears the decedent's name, a case number if law enforcement is involved, and some descriptors like hair and eye color. In many places, actual toe tags are no longer used due to hygiene concerns but have been replaced by wrist or ankle bands that serve the same purpose. Also, toe tags are used for correct identification of which body they are handling.

== See also ==
- Body bag
- Dog tag
