= Autopsy (disambiguation) =

Autopsy is a Greek word meaning 'seeing for yourself', and is usually employed in a medical sense, referring to the examination of a corpse in order to determine cause of death.

Autopsy may also refer to:

== Arts, entertainment, and media ==
=== Films ===
- Autopsy (1975 film), Italian film
- Autopsy (2008 film), American horror film
- The Autopsy of Jane Doe, a 2016 film

=== Music ===
- Autopsy (band), death metal band
- Autopsy (45 Grave album), 1987
- Autopsy (Rorschach album), 1995
- The Autopsy, a 1994 album by American rapper C-Bo
- "Autopsy", a song by Fairport Convention from their 1969 album Unhalfbricking

=== Television ===
- "Autopsy" (House), 2005 episode of the American television series House
- Autopsy (TV series), American documentary television series
- “Autopsy”, an episode of The Good Doctor

== Other uses ==
- "Autopsy", an 1830's steam bus built by Walter Hancock
- Autopsy (software), open source computer forensics software tool

== See also ==
- Post-mortem (disambiguation)
