= Post-mortem (disambiguation) =

Post-mortem (meaning "after death") is short for "post-mortem examination", or autopsy, an examination of a corpse in order to determine cause of death.

Post-mortem may also refer to:

== Science and technology ==
- Post-mortem chemistry, a branch of chemistry for studying of chemical and biochemical phenomena in a cadaver
- Post-mortem interval, the time that has elapsed since a person has died
- Post-mortem documentation, a technical analysis of a finished project
- Postmortem studies, a neurobiological research method
- Post-mortem debugging, the debugging of software after it has crashed

== Arts, entertainment, and media ==
=== Films ===
- Post Mortem (1982 film), a 1982 Indian Malayalam film
- Post Mortem (1999 film), a 1999 Canadian film
- Post Mortem (2010 film), a 2010 Chilean film
- Post Mortem (2020 film), a 2020 Hungarian film
- Postmortem (1998 film), a 1998 film starring Charlie Sheen

=== Literature ===
- Post-Mortem (Coward play), a 1930 play by Noël Coward
- Post Mortem (Gurney play), a 2006 play by A. R. Gurney
- Post Mortem, a 1968 book by Albert Caraco
- Postmortem (novel), a novel by Patricia Cornwell
- Post Mortem: JFK Assassination Cover Up, 1975 book by Harold Weisberg
- Postmortem: New Evidence in the Case of Sacco and Vanzetti, 1985 book by David E. Kaiser and William Young

=== Music ===
- Post Mortem (Black Tide album), 2011
- Post Mortem (Dillom album), 2021
- Post Mortem (band), a thrash metal band from Boston, Massachusetts
- "Post Mortem", a song from God Is an Astronaut's 2008 self-titled album
- "Postmortem", a song from Slayer's 1986 album, Reign in Blood

=== Television ===
- Post Mortem (TV series), a 2007 German crime drama
- Post Mortem: No One Dies in Skarnes a 2021 Norwegian supernatural television series
- "Post Mortem" (House), an episode of the television series House
- "Post Mortem", the seventh episode of the seventh season of CSI: Crime Scene Investigation
- "Post Mortem", the second episode of the 2024 Manhunt miniseries

=== Other arts, entertainment, and media ===
- Post Mortem (video game), a 2002 adventure game
- Post-mortem photography, a style of photography popular in the 19th century

== See also ==
- Autopsy (disambiguation)
- Posthumous (disambiguation)
