= 1963/1967 =

Compilation album by Mina
- Released: 7 November 2025
- Recorded: 1963–1967
- Genre: Pop
- Language: Italian
- Labels: PDU; Peer-Southern

Mina chronology
| Gassa d'amante (2025) | 1963/1967 (2025) | 1963/1967 – Rarità e versioni alternative (2025) |

1963/1967 – Rarità e versioni alternative

Box set by Mina
- Released: 7 November 2025
- Recorded: 1963–1967
- Genres: Pop; jazz
- Languages: Italian; English; French; German; Japanese; Spanish; Turkish
- Labels: PDU; Peer-Southern

Mina chronology
| 1963/1967 (2025) | 1963/1967 – Rarità e versioni alternative (2025) | 1963/1967 – Dilettevoli eccedenze (2025) |

1963/1967 – Dilettevoli eccedenze

EP by Mina
- Released: 7 November 2025
- Recorded: 1963–1967
- Genre: Pop
- Languages: Italian; English
- Labels: PDU; Peer-Southern

Mina chronology
| 1963/1967 – Rarità e versioni alternative (2025) | 1963/1967 – Dilettevoli eccedenze (2025) | Dilettevoli inedite eccedenze (2026) |

Professional ratings
Review scores
| Source | Rating |
|---|---|
| Il manifesto | 5/5 stars |

1963/1967 is a series of compilations released by Italian singer Mina on 7 November 2025 by PDU. All the songs were recorded during the specified period when the singer was recording on the Ri-Fi label. There have been three releases:

- The album 1963/1967 was released on compact disc and vinyl and digitally includes 28 songs described as the most significant songs of that period.
- The four-disc box set 1963/1967 – Rarità e versioni alternative (limited edition of 1,000 copies) contains 102 songs, including six unreleased versions and rare performances in Japanese, Turkish, English, Spanish, German and French.
- The third album 1963/1967 – Dilettevoli eccedenze was released in digital EP format.

== Track listing ==
=== 1963/1967 ===
1. "Città vuota" – 2:39
2. "È l'uomo per me" – 2:23
3. "Un buco nella sabbia" – 2:21
4. "Un anno d'amore" – 3:11
5. "E se domani" – 3:05
6. "Io sono quel che sono" – 2:11
7. "Tu farai" – 2:27
8. "Un bacio è troppo poco" – 3:11
9. "Brava" – 1:45
10. "Soli" – 3:00
11. "L'ultima occasione (Uno come te)" – 2:45
12. "Ora o mai più" – 2:24
13. "Addio" – 2:28
14. "Più di te" – 2:31
15. "Una casa in cima al mondo" – 3:00
16. "Se tu non fossi qui" – 3:00
17. "Ta-ra-ta-ta" – 2:08
18. "Breve amore" – 2:33
19. "Se telefonando" – 2:56
20. "Sono come tu mi vuoi" – 3:33
21. "Mai così" – 2:50
22. "Mi sei scoppiato dentro il cuore" – 3:04
23. "L'immensità" – 2:37
24. "Conversazione" – 2:19
25. "Sabati e domeniche" – 2:44
26. "Se c'è una cosa che mi fa impazzire" – 2:39
27. "La banda" – 2:35
28. "Se tornasse, caso mai" – 2:52

=== 1963/1967 – Rarità e versioni alternative ===
Disc 1

1. "The Nearness of You" – 2:40
2. "Angel Eyes" – 2:27
3. "Nadie me ama (Ninguém Me Ama)" – 2:48
4. "La barca (Corazón)" – 3:08
5. "Stella by Starlight" – 2:26
6. "Insensatez" – 2:46
7. "E se domani" – 3:07
8. "Non illuderti" – 2:54
9. "Sabor a Mí" – 3:04
10. "You Go to My Head" – 2:58
11. "Stars Fell on Alabama" – 3:17
12. "Everything Happens to Me" – 2:40
13. "Se non ci fossi tu" – 2:27
14. "Uno" – 2:54
15. "Full Moon and Empty Arms" – 2:47
16. "I'm Glad There Is You" – 2:28
17. "Lontanissimo (Somewhere)" – 2:05
18. "Caminemos" – 2:33
19. "Lunedì 26 ottobre" – 2:36
20. "Ebb Tide" – 2:41
21. "Invitation" – 3:01
22. "Angustia" – 3:05
23. "My Melancholy Baby" – 3:23
24. "I'm a Fool to Want You" – 1:56
25. "You Go to My Head" – 3:02
26. "Stars Fell on Alabama" – 3:22
27. "Se Telefonando" – 2:58

Disc 2

1. "Vocalizzi" (Inedito da lacca) – 3:54
2. "È inutile" – 1:54
3. "Valentino vale" – 2:03
4. "È l'uomo per me (He Walks Like a Man)" – 2:23
5. "So che non è così" – 2:18
6. "Se mi compri un gelato" – 2:00
7. "Io sono quel che sono" – 2:16
8. "Se piangi se ridi" – 2:32
9. "So che mi vuoi (It's for You)" – 2:10
10. "E... (Adesso sono tua)" – 3:01
11. "Era vivere" – 2:26
12. "Kanashimi Wa Sora No Kanata Ni – 悲しみは空のかなたに (Sette mari)" – 2:26
13. "Chi siete" – 2:10
14. "La tua festa d'amore" (Inedito da lacca) – 2:19
15. "Sono qui per te" – 2:56
16. "Se telefonando" – 2:16
17. "No" – 2:37
18. "Un anno d'amore (C'est irréparable)" – 3:13
19. "L'ultima occasione (Uno come te)" – 2:41
20. "Una casa in cima al mondo" – 2:57
21. "Sono come tu mi vuoi" – 3:34
22. "Mai così" – 2:49
23. "L'immensità" – 2:35
24. "Plus fort que nous" – 2:57

Disc 3

1. "Try Your Luck (Ta-ra-ta-ta)" (Inedito da lacca) – 2:07
2. "Eccomi" – 2:28
3. "Canta ragazzina" – 2:47
4. "Tu non credi più" – 3:11
5. "Se tornasse, caso mai (If He Walked into My Life)" – 2:45
6. "Quando vedrò" – 3:30
7. "Noi due" – 3:17
8. "Portami con te" – 2:37
9. "Tu non mi lascerai" – 2:20
10. "Cartoline" – 1:56
11. "Nel fondo del mio cuore (En un rincón del alma)" – 2:41
12. "L'elisir tirati su" (Inedito) – 1:30
13. "Renato" (Live) – 1:41
14. "Io sono quel che sono" – 2:18
15. "So che non è così" – 2:19
16. "E... (Adesso sono tua)" – 3:03
17. "The Man I Love" (Live) – 3:54
18. "Suna Ni Kieta Namida – 砂にきえた涙 -日本語 (Un buco nella sabbia)" – 2:17
19. "Wakare – 別離 (日本語) (Un anno d'amore (C'est irréparable))" – 3:11
20. "Kimi Ni Namida To Hohoemi Wo – 君に涙とほゝえみを (Se piangi se ridi)" – 2:30
21. "Kanashimi Wa Sora No Kanata Ni – 悲しみは空のかなたに (Sette mari)" – 2:25
22. "You Go to My Head" – 2:56
23. "È inutile" – 1:53
24. "Valentino vale" – 2:09
25. "Cenerentola" – 7:55
26. "Cappuccetto Rosso" – 4:55

Disc 4

1. "Ciudad solitaria (It's a Lonely Town)" – 2:41
2. "Mi hombre será (He Walks Like A Man)" – 2:25
3. "Yo soy la que soy (Io sono quel che sono)" – 2:13
4. "Un hoyo en la arena (Un buco nella sabbia)" – 2:21
5. "Sé que no es así (So che non è così)" – 2:16
6. "Qué harás (Tu farai)" – 2:16
7. "El crossfire (Crossfire!)" – 2:21
8. "El angel de la guarda" – 2:53
9. "El reloj" – 2:45
10. "Si lloras si ries (Se piangi, se ridi)" – 2:28
11. "Y si mañana (E se domani)" – 3:07
12. "Un año de amor (Un anno d'amore (C'est irréparable))" – 3:11
13. "Adios (Addio)" – 2:28
14. "Ahora o jamas (Ora o mai più)" – 2:27
15. "Si no estuvieras tu (Se tu non fossi qui)" – 2:59
16. "Una casa encima del mundo (Una casa in cima al mondo)" – 2:58
17. "La inmensidad (L'immensità)" – 2:35
18. "Canta muchachita (Canta ragazzina)" – 2:50
19. "Dön bana (Un anno d'amore (C'est irréparable))" – 3:11
20. "Nesvìm bahar (Io sono quel che sono)" – 2:13
21. "Nedem yildizlar (Soli)" – 3:09
22. "Die größte schau (È inutile)" – 1:55
23. "Tele-tele-telefon" – 2:12
24. "Ja, die liebe lebe hoch" (Live) – 2:33
25. "Si no estuvieras tu (Se tu non fossi qui)" – 2:59

=== 1963/1967 – Dilettevoli eccedenze ===
1. "Vocalizzi" – 3:54
2. "Try Your Luck (Ta-ra-ta-ta)" – 2:07
3. "La tua festa d'amore" – 2:19
4. "Chi siete" – 2:10
5. "Eccomi" – 2:29
6. "L'elisir tirati su" – 1:30

== Charts ==
Chart performance for 1963/1967
| Chart (2025) | Peak position |
|---|---|
| Italian Albums (FIMI) | 47 |
| Italian Physical Albums (FIMI) | 10 |

Chart performance for 1963/1967 – Rarità e versioni alternative
| Chart (2025) | Peak position |
|---|---|
| Italian Albums (FIMI) | 84 |
| Italian Physical Albums (FIMI) | 11 |
