= Brava (song) =

Single by Mina
- Language: Italian
- B-side: "E se domani" / "Più di te"
- Released: May 1965
- Genre: Pop
- Length: 1:48
- Label: Ri-Fi
- Songwriter: Bruno Canfora

Mina singles chronology
"Soli" (1965)	"Brava" (1965)	"L'ultima occasione" (1965)

"Brava" is a song written by Bruno Canfora and performed by Italian singer Mina. The song was first performed byMina on the air of the Studio Uno program in March 1965 and released as a single at the request of the audience. In May, "Brava" was released with the song "E se domani" on the back (but differs from the 1964 Mina album version). In November of the same year, an additional edition was released, but the B-side was the song "Più di te (I Won't Tell)". Despite the fact that the work was released on two singles, none of them received quantitative commercial success in the sales charts.

== Critical reception ==
Claudio Milano of OndaRock noted that the work, written by Maestro Bruno Canfora, is a pure exercise in style, although it is performed in an exemplary manner, both in composition for orchestra and in vocal interpretation, which, to put it mildly, is dizzying.

== Track listing ==
7" single
A. "Brava" – 1:48
B. "E se domani" (Carlo Alberto Rossi, Giorgio Calabrese) – 3:04

7" single
A. "Brava" – 1:48
B. "Più di te (I Won't Tell)" (Antonietta De Simone, Bob Crewe, Bob Gaudio) – 2:47
