= Mi sei scoppiato dentro il cuore =

Single by Mina

from the album Studio Uno 66
- Language: Italian
- B-side: "Tu non credi più"
- Released: December 1966
- Genre: Pop
- Length: 3:05
- Label: Ri-Fi
- Composer: Bruno Canfora
- Lyricist: Lina Wertmüller

Mina singles chronology
| "Sono come tu mi vuoi" (1966) | "Mi sei scoppiato dentro il cuore" (1966) | "L'immensità" (1967) |

"Mi sei scoppiato dentro il cuore" (English: "You broke into my heart") is a song by Italian singer Mina, which was first performed live on the TV program Studio Uno in the episode of 11 June 1966 and included in the album Studio Uno 66. The author of the lyrics was Lina Wertmüller, and the music was written by Bruno Canfora, who was also the artistic director of the program at that time.

Despite the fact that the song was aired back in June, it was released as a single only in December, so it reached only number 17 on the chart. In 2021, the song received a gold certificate from Federazione Industria Musicale Italiana for digital sales since 2009.

The B-side was the song "Tu non credi più" (words by Alberto Testa and Mogol, music by Tony Renis, arranged by Augusto Martelli), which in 1967 was performed by Mina in the program Sabato sera and later included in the album Sabato sera – Studio Uno '67.

== Track listing ==
7" single
A. "Mi sei scoppiato dentro il cuore" – 3:05
B. "Tu non credi più" (Alberto Testa, Mogol, Tony Renis) – 3:07

== Charts ==
Initial chart performance for "Mi sei scoppiato dentro il cuore"
| Chart (1966) | Peak position |
|---|---|
| Italy (Musica e dischi) | 17 |

2013 chart performance for "Mi sei scoppiato dentro il cuore"
| Chart (2013) | Peak position |
|---|---|
| Italy (FIMI) | 76 |

== Certifications and sales ==
| Region | Certification | Certified units/sales |
|---|---|---|
| Italy (FIMI) sales from 2009 | Platinum | 100,000^{‡} |
^{‡} Sales+streaming figures based on certification alone.

== Usage in media ==
The song was used in a commercial for Pasta Barilla (directed by Piero Gherardi), which aired in early 1967.

== Cover versions ==
In 2011, singer Annalisa performed the song live on the show Amici and included this version in her debut album Nali.
