= Studio Uno 66 =

Studio album by Mina
- Released: July 1966
- Genre: Pop
- Length: 32:33
- Language: Italian
- Label: Ri-Fi
- Producer: Wladimiro Albera

Mina studio albums chronology
Studio Uno (1965)	Studio Uno 66 (1966)	Mina 2 (1966)

Singles from Studio Uno 66
- 1. "Una casa in cima al mondo" Released: January 1966; 2. "Se telefonando" Released: May 1966; 3. "Breve amore" Released: June 1966; 4. "Mi sei scoppiato dentro il cuore" Released: December 1966

Studio Uno 66 is a studio album by Italian singer Mina, released in June 1966 by Ri-Fi.

== Overview ==
As the name implies, the album includes songs written specifically for Mina's performance in the fourth season of the popular television program Studio Uno. Initially, Mina was supposed to appear in all twelve episodes of the season as a presenter, but later the creators changed the format of the show and divided it into four parts of five episodes; in each block, the presenter was one of the main "prima donna" of the Italian stage of those years: Sandra Milo, Ornella Vanoni, Rita Pavone and, finally, Mina (notably, that it was the issues with her participation that became the most rated).

Almost all the songs from the album at the time of its release had already been released as singles and managed to occupy high positions in the charts. One of them, "Se telefonando", is Mina's flawless interpretation of a difficult song, composed and arranged by Ennio Morricone to lyrics by Maurizio Costanzo. The main theme of the song thrills around just three notes, taken from the siren of a police car in Marseille. In the reader's poll conducted by the La Repubblica newspaper to celebrate Mina's 70th anniversary in 2010, 30,000 voters picked the track as the best song ever recorded by Mina.

The album itself was released in July and topped the Italian chart. This album was also released abroad, in particular in the USA and Canada (distributed by United Artists Records), in Latin America the album was distributed under the name Bravissima. Subsequently, it was reissued several times, and a remastered version of the album was released in 2011.

== Track listing ==
Side A
No.	Title	Writer(s)	Length
1.	"Ta-ra-ta-ta (Try Your Luck)"	Alberto Testa; Franco Maresca; Louis Zerato	2:10
2.	"No"	Jimmy Fontana; Gianni Boncompagni; Carlo Pes	2:25
3.	"Se tu non fossi qui"	Carlo Alberto Rossi; Marisa Terzi	3:03
4.	"Breve amore (You Never Told Me)"	Alberto Sordi; Piero Piccioni	2:36
5.	"Sono qui per te"	Bruno Canfora; Lina Wertmüller	2:58
6.	"Mai cosi"	Canfora; Wertmüller	2:53
Total length:			16:05

Side B
No.	Title	Writer(s)	Length
1.	"Se telefonando"	Maurizio Costanzo; Ghigo De Chiara; Ennio Morricone	2:58
2.	"Mi sei scoppiato dentro il cuore"	Canfora; Wertmüller	3:09
3.	"Una casa in cima al mondo"	Pino Donaggio; Vito Pallavicini	3:01
4.	"Addio"	Antonio Amurri; Piero Piccioni	2:28
5.	"Ebb tide"	Carl Sigman; Robert Maxwell	2:43
6.	"Lontanissimo (Somewhere)"	Leonard Bernstein; Stephen Sondheim; Alberto Curci	2:09
Total length:			16:28

== Personnel ==
- Mina – vocals
- Augusto Martelli – arrangement, conducting (A1, B5, B6)
- Carlo Pes – arrangement, conducting (A2)
- Gianfranco Monaldi – arrangement, conducting (A3)
- Piero Piccioni (Piero Morgan) – arrangement, conducting (A4, B4)
- Bruno Canfora – arrangement, conducting (A5, A6, B2)
- Ennio Morricone – arrangement, conducting (B1)
- Angelo Giacomazzi – arrangement, conducting (B3)

Credits are adapted from the album's liner notes.

== Charts ==
=== Weekly charts ===
Weekly chart performance for Studio Uno 66
Chart (1966)	Peak position
Italian Albums (Musica e dischi)	1

=== Monthly charts ===
Monthly chart performance for Studio Uno 66
Chart (1966)	Peak position
Italian Albums (Musica e dischi)	1
