= Sabato sera – Studio Uno '67 =

Studio album by Mina
- Released: June 1967
- Genre: Pop
- Length: 28:20
- Language: Italian
- Label: Ri-Fi
- Producer: Wladimiro Albera

Mina studio albums chronology
Mina 2 (1966)	Sabato sera – Studio Uno '67 (1967)	Dedicato a mio padre (1967)

Singles from Sabato sera – Studio Uno '67
- 1. "L'immensità" Released: February 1967; 2. "Conversazione" Released: April 1967; 3. "La banda (A Banda)" Released: May 1967; 4. "Tu non mi lascerai" Released: October 1967

Sabato sera – Studio Uno '67 is a studio album by Italian singer Mina, issued in 1967.

== Overview ==
The songs from this album were originally recorded by Mina to participate in the new television program Sabato sera, which replaced the program Studio Uno. Mina took part in the program as a presenter. Previously, the singer has already released albums with material from the Studio Uno programs.

The album consists entirely of songs in Italian. Despite the fact that the previous album, Mina 2, was released using a new technology with stereo sound, this album has a mono sound.

The album was released in May 1967, when the show Sabato sera was already airing on Rai. This was the singer's last studio album released on the Ri-Fi label, the next albums will be released on her own label, PDU. The record reached the first position in the Italian chart. An export version of the album was also prepared for release in Latin America, the title was shortened (to Sabato sera), the order of the tracks was changed, and their titles were translated into Spanish. In 1997, RCA Italiana released a remastered version of the album.

== Track listing ==
Side A
No.	Title	Writer(s)	Length
1.	"La banda (A Banda)"	Chico Buarque de Hollanda; Antonio Amurri	2:34
2.	"Tu non credi più"	Tony Renis; Alberto Testa; Mogol	3:11
3.	"Se c'è una cosa che mi fa impazzire"	Amurri; Bruno Canfora	2:40
4.	"Se tornasse caso mai (If He Walked Into My Life)"	Jerry Herman; Giorgio Calabrese	2:43
5.	"Quando vedrò"	Carlo Alberto Rossi; Marisa Terzi	3:31
Total length:			14:39

Side B
No.	Title	Writer(s)	Length
1.	"L'immensità"	Don Backy; Detto Mariano; Mogol	2:39
2.	"Conversazione"	Amurri; Canfora	2:22
3.	"Sabati e domeniche"	Mogol; Giancarlo Colonnello	2:47
4.	"Noi due"	Alberto Testa; Augusto Martelli	3:14
5.	"Portami con te"	Amurri; Canfora	2:39
Total length:			13:41

== Charts ==
=== Weekly charts ===
Weekly chart performance for Sabato sera – Studio Uno '67
Chart (1967)	Peak position
Italian Albums (Musica e dischi)	1

=== Monthly charts ===
Monthly chart performance for Sabato sera – Studio Uno '67
Chart (1967)	Peak position
Italian Albums (Musica e dischi)	1
