= Studio Uno (album) =

Studio album by Mina
- Released: March 1965
- Recorded: 1963–1965
- Genre: Pop
- Length: 30:45
- Language: Italian
- Label: Ri-Fi

Mina studio albums chronology
Mina (1964)	Studio Uno (1965)	Studio Uno 66 (1966)

Singles from Studio Uno
- 1. "Città vuota" Released: December 1963; 2. "È l'uomo per me" Released: March 1964; 3. "Un buco nella sabbia" Released: May 1964; 4. "Io sono quel che sono" Released: September 1964; 5. "Un anno d'amore" Released: November 1964; 6. "Se piangi se ridi" Released: February 1965; 7. "L'ultima occasione" Released: June 1965

Studio Uno is a studio album by Italian singer Mina, released in March 1965 by Ri-Fi. All songs were performed during the Saturday TV show Studio Uno. Thanks to such hits as "Città vuota", "È l'uomo per me", "Un anno d'amore", and "Un buco nella sabbia", the record reached the top of the Italian chart.

== Track listing ==
Side A
No.	Title	Lyrics	Music	Length
1.	"L'ultima occasione"	Tony Del Monaco	Gianni Meccia; Jimmy Fontana	2:43
2.	"Un anno d'amore (C'est irreparable)"	Mogol; Alberto Testa	Nino Ferrer	3:10
3.	"Se piangi, se ridi"	Mogol	Bobby Solo; Gianni Marchetti	2:38
4.	"Più di te (I Won't Tell)"	Antonietta De Simone	Bob Gaudio; Bob Crewe	2:47
5.	"È l'uomo per me (He Walks Like a Man)"	Gaspare Gabriele Abbate; Vito Pallavicini	Diane Hildebrand	2:20
6.	"Un buco nella sabbia"	Testa	Piero Soffici	2:18
Total length:				15:56

Side B
No.	Title	Lyrics	Music	Length
1.	"So che mi vuoi (It's for You)"	Testa	John Lennon; Paul McCartney	2:08
2.	"E... (E adesso sono tua)"	Testa	Bruno Martelli	3:00
3.	"Tu farai"	Testa	Augusto Martelli; B. Martelli	2:25
4.	"Era vivere"	Testa	A. Martelli; B. Martelli	2:23
5.	"Città vuota (It's a Lonely Town)"	Giuseppe Cassia	Doc Pomus; Mort Shuman	2:40
6.	"Io sono quel che sono"	Mogol	Enrico Polito	2:13
Total length:				14:49

== Charts ==
=== Weekly charts ===
Weekly chart performance for Studio Uno
Chart (1965)	Peak position
Italian Albums (Musica e dischi)	1

=== Monthly charts ===
Monthly chart performance for Studio Uno
Chart (1965)	Peak position
Italian Albums (Musica e dischi)	1

=== Year-end charts ===
Year-end chart performance for Studio Uno
Chart (1965)	Position
Italian Albums (Musica e dischi)	1

== Cover versions ==
During the years of her long career, Mina re-recorded most of the songs of this album. In 1965, she covered "Un anno d'amore" in other three languages: in Spanish ("Un año de amor" with lyrics written by Gaby Verlor), in Turkish ("Dön bana") and in Japanese ("Wakare"), plus a second Spanish version in 2007 (lyrics by Pedro Almodóvar) for Todavía, in a duo with the flamenco singer Diego El Cigala. "Tu farai" was recorded in Spanish with the title of "Qué harás", as well as "È l'uomo per me" ("Mi hombre será"), "Città vuota" ("Ciudad solitaria"), "Io sono quel che sono" ("Yo soy la que soy"), "Se piangi, se ridi" ("Si lloras, si ríes") and "Un buco nella sabbia" ("Un hoyo en la arena"). While these last two were also recorded in Japanese (respectively with the titles "Kimi ni namida to hohoemi wo" and "Suna ni kieta namida"), "Io sono quel che sono" was also sung in Turkish ("Mesvim bahar"). In 1978, Mina made a sort of disco version of "Città vuota", issued on CD only twenty years later for the album compilation Mina Studio Collection. All the other songs were collected, during the 1990s, in unofficial compilation albums, such as España, mi amor..., Mina latina and Mina in the world.
