= Una casa in cima al mondo =

1966 song

Single by Pino Donaggio
- B-side: "Non ho colpa"
- Released: 1966
- Genre: Pop
- Label: Columbia
- Songwriters: Vito Pallavicini, Pino Donaggio

Pino Donaggio singles chronology
"Un amore" (1965)	"Una casa in cima al mondo" (1966)	"Io mi domando" (1966)

"Una casa in cima al mondo"

Single by Mina

from the album Studio Uno 66
- B-side: "Se tu non fossi qui"
- Released: January 1966
- Length: 3:01
- Label: Ri-Fi

Mina singles chronology
"Ora o mai più" (1965)	"Una casa in cima al mondo" (1966)	"Se telefonando" (1966)

"Una casa in cima al mondo" is a 1966 Italian song composed by Vito Pallavicini and Pino Donaggio. The song premiered at the 16th edition of the Sanremo Music Festival, with a double performance by Donaggio and Claudio Villa, and placed at the fourth place.

The song got an immediate commercial success, with the Donaggio's version peaking at the eleventh place on the Italian hit parade. It was immediately covered by Mina, and her version got an even larger success, ranking #8 on the Italian hit parade. Donaggio and Mina also recorded a Spanish version of the song, "Una casa encima del mundo".

It was later covered by numerous artists in several languages, including a French version titled "Demain" recorded by Josephine Baker and Luis Mariano, a Portuguese version titled "Uma Casa Sobre O Mundo" by João Dias, and an English version titled "Don't Cry" recorded by The Ray Charles Singers.

== Track listing ==
Pino Donaggio – 7" single

1. "Una casa in cima al mondo" – 3:35
2. "Non ho colpa" (Vito Pallavicini, Pino Donaggio) – 2:47

Mina – 7" single

1. "Una casa in cima al mondo" – 3:01
2. "Se tu non fossi qui" (Carlo Alberto Rossi, Marisa Terzi) – 3:03

== Charts ==
Chart performance for "Una casa in cima al mondo" by Pino Donaggio
Chart (1966)	Peak position
Italy (Musica e dischi)	11

Chart performance for "Una casa in cima al mondo" by Mina
Chart (1966)	Peak position
Argentina (CAPIF)	7
Italy (Billboard)	8
Italy (Musica e dischi)	8
