= Christmas Song Book (Mina album) =

2013 album by Italian singer Mina

Studio album by Mina
- Released: 19 November 2013
- Recorded: 2010–2013
- Studio: Studi PDU, Lugano
- Genre: Christmas; jazz
- Length: 37:47
- Label: GSU
- Producer: Massimiliano Pani; Ugo Bongianni

Mina chronology
12 (American Song Book) (2012)	Christmas Song Book (2013)	Selfie (2014)

Christmas Song Book is a studio album by Italian singer Mina, released on 19 November 2013 by GSU.

== Overview ==
In the album, Mina covers twelve Christmas songs, written between 1818 ("Stille Nacht, heilige Nacht", original version of "Silent Night") and 1973 ("Old Fashion Christmas"). Among the others, she sings four Bing Crosby hits ("The Secret of Christmas", "I'll Be Home for Christmas", "How Lovely Is Christmas" and "White Christmas"). The song "Baby, It's Cold Outside", always performed in a duo, has been recorded with Italian comedian and TV presenter Fiorello.

Two songs were previously released: "Have Yourself a Merry Little Christmas" (for the 2012 album, 12 (American Song Book)) and "Silent Night" (for the 2010 movie, The Santa Claus Gang by Italian comedians Aldo, Giovanni & Giacomo and published in the EP Piccola strenna).

During the design of the album, drawings in the style of "Disney" were used, specially painted by Giorgio Cavazzano, Mina herself appeared in the image of Mina Duck; previously, a similar design was used for the 1998 album Mina Celentano. The album was released in three versions:

- CD with a book containing 18 pages of illustrations, song descriptions and a letter from Mina to the listeners.
- CD with a book containing 248 pages of Disney Christmas stories.
- LP (limited edition), including, in addition to a color vinyl record, 12 illustrations by Cavazzano in large format.

The album reached number 6 on the Italian Albums chart and was certified platinum by Federazione Industria Musicale Italiana.

== Track listing ==
No.	Title	Writer(s)	Length
1.	"Old Fashion Christmas"	Kenny Williams; F. P. Sturm	5:59
2.	"The Secret of Christmas"	Jimmy Van Heusen; Sammy Cahn	4:51
3.	"Baby, It's Cold Outside"	Frank Loesser	2:25
4.	"I'll Be Home for Christmas"	Walter Kent; Kim Gannon	3:22
5.	"Have Yourself a Merry Little Christmas"	Ralph Blane; Hugh Martin	3:59
6.	"Jingle Bell Rock"	Joseph Carleton Beal; James Ross Boothe	1:19
7.	"Silent Night (Stille Nacht, heilige Nacht)"	Franz Xaver Gruber; John Freeman Young; Joseph Mohr	3:06
8.	"Let It Snow"	Jule Styne; Cahn	2:48
9.	"How Lovely Is Christmas"	Alec Wilder; Arnold Sundgaard	1:59
10.	"Santa Claus Got Stuck in My Chimney"	Billy Moore Jr.; William D. Hardy	2:48
11.	"It Came Upon a Midnight Clear"	Richard Storrs Willis; Edmund Sears	2:25
12.	"White Christmas"	Irving Berlin	2:36
Total length:			37:47

== Charts ==
=== Weekly charts ===
Weekly chart performance for Christmas Song Book
Chart (2013)	Peak position
Italian Albums (FIMI)	6

=== Year-end charts ===
Year-end chart performance for Christmas Song Book
Chart (2013)	Position
Italian Albums (FIMI)	32

== Certifications ==
Certifications for Christmas Song Book
Region	Certification	Certified units/sales
Italy (FIMI)	Platinum	50,000^{‡}
^{‡} Sales+streaming figures based on certification alone.
