= Un buco nella sabbia =

- One of the variants of the Japanese edition

Single by Mina

from the album Studio Uno
- Language: Italian
- B-side: "Se mi compri un gelato"
- Released: May 1964
- Genre: Pop
- Length: 2:18
- Label: Ri-Fi
- Composer: Piero Soffici
- Lyricist: Alberto Testa

Mina singles chronology
"Fremdes Land" (1964)	"Un buco nella sabbia" (1964)	"Rapsodie" (1964)

"Un buco nella sabbia" (English: "A Hole in the Sand") is a song by Italian singer Mina, written by Piero Soffici and Alberto Testa. The song was released as a single, reaching number 7 on the Italian chart, and was later included in the album Studio Uno (1965).

There is also a Spanish-language version titled "Un Hoyo en la Arena", released in Spain in 1964 on the EP Mina Canta en Español.

In 1965, a Japanese version of the song with lyrics by Kenji Sazanami was released in Japan. The song achieved extraordinary success, taking the second position on the chart, and sales exceeded 400,000 copies; at the end of the year, Mina was also recognized as the best international artist.

== Track listing ==
7" single (Italy)
A. "Un buco nella sabbia" – 2:18
B. "Se mi compri un gelato" (Vito Pallavicini, Italo Terzoli, Bernardino Zapponi, Gorni Kramer) – 1:58

7" single (Japan)
A. "砂にきえた涙の歌詞 (Suna ni kieta namida)" – 2:22
B. "Un buco nella sabbia" – 2:18

== Charts ==
=== Weekly charts ===
Chart performance for "Un buco nella sabbia"
Chart (1964–1965)	Peak position
Italy (Musica e dischi)	7
Japan (Oricon)	1

=== Year-end charts ===
Chart performance for "Un buco nella sabbia"
Chart (1965)	Peak position
Japan (Oricon)	10
