= Mina 2 =

Studio album by Mina
- Released: November 1966
- Genre: Pop; jazz
- Length: 32:23
- Language: Italian; English; Spanish
- Label: Ri-Fi

Mina chronology
Studio Uno 66 (1966)	Mina 2 (1966)	Sabato sera – Studio Uno '67 (1967)

Singles from Mina 2
- 1. "Sono come tu mi vuoi" Released: September 1966

Mina 2 (or Mina Due) is the tenth studio album by Italian singer Mina, released in November 1966 by Ri-Fi.

== Overview ==
This studio work mainly consists of foreign songs performed in the original language. Most of them had never been released before, with the exception of the opening song "Se non ci fossi tu", released a month earlier as a single, as well as the songs "Lontanissimo (Somewhere)" and "Ebb Tide", released on the previous studio album Studio Uno 66 in July of the same year.

Augusto Martelli was involved as a song arranger and conductor of his orchestra.

The album was released in November 1966 in mono sound format, but a month later it was reissued with stereo sound. It became the eighth in the sales chart. The album was also distributed in Latin American countries under the name Mina 5 – El Quinto Disco de la Ùnica with a slightly changed track order, but with the same cover.

== Critical reception ==
Claudio Milano from OndaRock highlighted the track "My Melancholy Baby" in the album with an exquisite Martelli arrangement and Mina's personal interpretation: "The interpreter's voice, announced by a caressing string intro, immediately flies on high frequencies, caressed with superb lightness, to become loaded with harmonics as it falls back on low and deliberately dirty frequencies, with a typically "Fitzgerald" manner that is not as soon as the brass appears to thunder. While the strings retain an almost fairy-tale dimension, the singing shows off a palette of colors that transfigures every word into a thousand of a thousand. It is a continuous up and down: in high gracefulness, on the low frequencies a support of the orchestral crescendos. There is also room for a trumpet solo, supported by repetitions on the piano. Mina closes with a unique elegance of timbre and phrasing. Pure enchantment".

== Track listing ==
Side A
No.	Title	Writer(s)	Length
1.	"Se non ci fossi tu"	Mario Rusca; Vito Pallavicini	2:25
2.	"Uno (Tango celebre)"	Enrique Santos Discépolo; Marianito Morés	2:57
3.	"Full Moon and Empty Arms"	Ted Mossman; Buddy Kaye	2:48
4.	"I'm Glad There Is You"	Jimmy Dorsey; Paul Madeira	2:31
5.	"Lontanissimo (Somewhere)"	Leonard Bernstein; Stephen Sondheim; Alberto Curci	2:07
6.	"Caminemos"	Herivelto Martins; Alfredo Gil	2:36
Total length:			15:24

Side B
No.	Title	Writer(s)	Length
1.	"Lunedì 26 ottobre"	Franco Califano; Gigi Cichellero; Giuseppe Marchese	2:39
2.	"Ebb tide"	Carl Sigman; Robert Maxwell	2:43
3.	"Invitation"	Paul Francis Webster; Bronislaw Kaper	3:07
4.	"Angustia"	Orlando Brito	3:08
5.	"My Melancholy Baby"	George A. Norton; Ernie Burnett	3:23
6.	"I'm a Fool to Want You"	Frank Sinatra; Jack Wolf; Joel Heron	1:59
Total length:			16:59

== Charts ==
Chart performance for Mina 2
Chart (1964)	Peak position
Italian Albums (Musica e dischi)	8
