= Un anno d'amore =

Single by Mina

from the album Studio Uno
- Language: Italian
- B-side: "E se domani"
- Released: November 1964
- Recorded: 1964
- Genre: Pop
- Length: 3:10
- Label: Ri-Fi
- Composer: Nino Ferrer
- Lyricists: Mogol; Alberto Testa

Mina singles chronology
"Io sono quel che sono" (1964)	"Un anno d'amore" (1964)	"Se piangi se ridi" (1965)

Music video
- "Un anno d'amore" on YouTube

"Un anno d'amore" (English: "A Year of Love") is a song recorded by Italian singer Mina. The song is a cover version of the French song "C'est irréparable", originally written and recorded by Nino Ferrer. The Italian lyrics were written by Mogol and Alberto Testa. The song is arranged by Augusto Martelli.

In November 1964, the song was released as a single. It became number one on the Italian singles chart and spent a total of eleven consecutive weeks in the top three. Also, the song receive gold certification. The B-side was the song "E se domani", which was previously included in the album Mina (1964), but in a different version. In 1965, it was reissued with the song "Era vivere" as a B-side. The song "Un anno d'amore" was included in the album Studio Uno (1965).

Among other things, Mina recorded "Un anno d'amore" in Spanish ("Un año de amor"), Japanese ("Wakare") and Turkish ("Dön bana"). In 2007, for her album Todavía, Mina re-recorded the song in Spanish in a duet with Diego el Cigala. She also recorded the song "E se domani" in Spanish ("Y si mañana"), and in 1988 she re-recorded an acoustic version in Italian for the compilation Oggi ti amo di più.

== Charts ==
=== Weekly charts ===
Weekly chart performance for "Un anno d'amore"
Chart (1964–65)	Peak position
Italy (Billboard)	1
Italy (Musica e dischi)	1

=== Year-end charts ===
Year-end chart performance for "Un anno d'amore"
Chart (1965)	Position
Italy (Cashbox)	58
Japan (Cashbox)	20

== Cover versions ==
- Italian singer Iva Zanicchi originally wanted to record an Italian version of the song, but the author told her that he had already let maestro Vittorio Buffoli hear it and he stopped it for a Mina, although according to Zanicchi, Mina did not like the song. Zanicchi recorded it in 1987 for the album Care colleghe, which features cover versions of songs by her colleagues on the Italian scene.
- For his 1991 film High Heels, Pedro Almodovar used the Spanish song "Un año de amor", and he translated the songs from Italian, not the original French.
- In 2008, Italian singer Orietta Berti recorded the song for her album Swing – Un omaggio alla mia maniera.
- In 2010, Serbian and Yugoslav punk rock band Pekinška Patka recorded a punk rock cover of the Spanish version, releasing it as a single.
- In 2012, Al Bano recorded song in Italian for his album Fratelli d'Italia and in Spanish for Canta Italia.
