= Everything Happens to Me (song) =

1940 pop standard by Adair and Dennis

Song by Tommy Dorsey Orchestra featuring Frank Sinatra
- Genre: Pop standard
- Composer: Matt Dennis
- Lyricist: Tom Adair

"Everything Happens to Me" (1940) is a pop standard written by Tom Adair (lyrics) and Matt Dennis (music). It was first recorded by the Tommy Dorsey Orchestra featuring Frank Sinatra. Unusually, the song focused on Sinatra's vocal, with no trombone solo by Dorsey. Years later, Sinatra rerecorded the song with the Hollywood String Quartet; this version was featured on his 1957 album Close to You.

== Notable versions ==
- Chet Baker – (Chet Baker Sings) It Could Happen to You (1958)
- June Christy – A Friendly Session, Vol. 1 (2000) with the Johnny Guarnieri Quintet, Cool Christy (2002)
- Rosemary Clooney
- Nat King Cole
- Clare Fischer – Alone Together (recorded 1975, released 1977 in Germany by MPS Records, and in the US by Discovery Records in 1980). Speaking with the Los Angeles Times in 1986, the composer - himself a popular singer-pianist who counted Fischer as one of his major influences - called this solo piano rendition "fantastic".
- Ella Fitzgerald with the Frank De Vol orchestra – Hello, Love (1960)
- Stan Getz – At Storyville (1951)
- Billie Holiday recorded the song with Her Orchestra in New York City on February 14, 1955. Her orchestra consisted of Charlie Shavers on trumpet, Tony Scott on clarinet, Budd Johnson on tenor saxophone, Carl Drinkard on piano, Billy Bauer on guitar, Leonard Gaskin on bass, and Cozy Cole on drums.
- Julie London – Julie...At Home (1962). Al Viola on acoustic guitar
- Branford Marsalis – Bloomington (1991)
- Pat Metheny recorded a solo guitar version for his 2024 album MoonDial.
- Mina – Mina (1964), 12 (American Song Book) (2012)
- Thelonious Monk –Thelonious Alone in San Francisco (1959) + Solo Monk (1965)
- Gerry Mulligan – Presenting the Gerry Mulligan Sextet (1956)
- Charlie Parker – Charlie Parker with Strings (1949)
- Frank Sinatra – Close to You (1957)
