= Senza rete =

- Created by: Giorgio Calabrese
- Country of origin: Italy
- Original language: Italian
- No. of seasons: 8

Original release
- Network: Programma Nazionale
- Release: June 27, 1968 – August 16, 1975

Senza rete ("Without a network") was a music show created by Giorgio Calabrese and broadcast by Rai 1 (at the time Programma Nazionale) from 1968 to 1975.

== History ==
The first episode was aired June 27, 1968. Initially broadcast on Thursday night, thanks to the high ratings (up to 18 million viewers) starting from the third edition it was moved to the more prestigious Saturday night slot. The show consisted on two or three popular musical guests performing live several hits of their repertoire at the Auditorium Rai in Naples.

Over the years several presenters alternated: Enrico Simonetti, Luciano Salce, Raffaele Pisu, Ric e Gian, Enrico Montesano, Paolo Villaggio, Renato Rascel, Pippo Baudo, Aldo Giuffrè, Alberto Lupo, Lino Banfi, Jenny Tamburi. Pino Calvi (1968-1973), Bruno Canfora (1974) and Tony De Vita (1975) served as conductors.

Among the guests of the show, there were Mina, Milva, Rita Pavone, Ornella Vanoni, Gianni Morandi, Bruno Lauzi, Enzo Jannacci, Antonello Venditti, Roberto Vecchioni, Le Orme, Pooh, Mia Martini, Marcella Bella, Vinicius de Moraes and Toquinho, New Trolls.
