= Sono come tu mi vuoi =

Single by Mina
- Language: Italian
- B-side: "Se non ci fossi tu"
- Released: September 1966
- Genre: Pop
- Length: 3:34
- Label: Ri-Fi
- Composer: Bruno Canfora
- Lyricists: Antonio Amurri; Maurizio Jurgens

Mina singles chronology
"Breve amore" (1966)	"Sono come tu mi vuoi" (1966)	"Mi sei scoppiato dentro il cuore" (1966)

Music video
- "Sono come tu mi vuoi" on YouTube

"Sono come tu mi vuoi" (English: "I Am What You Want Me to Be") is a 1966 song by Italian singer Mina.

== Overview ==
The song was written by Bruno Canfora, Antonio Amurri and Maurizio Jurgens. In 1966, it was recorded and released as a single by Italian singer Mina. This is one of the last singles recorded by Mina for the Ri-Fi label, and never appeared on studio albums, but only on compilations released after the singer's move to the PDU label. The reason for the release of the song was Mina's participation in the first season of the radio program Gran varietà, and "Sono come tu mi vuoi" was also the main theme for it.

Released as a single, the song managed to reach number four on the Italian chart, spending a total of ten weeks on it.

== Reception ==
The music reference book Dizionario della Canzone Italiana stated that Mina does not risk falling into interpretative mannerism even when it comes to singing yet another theme song, indeed, thanks to the quality of the musical material provided to her and her extraordinary singing skills, pieces like this have become classics of pop music.

== Track listing ==
7" single
A. "Sono come tu mi vuoi" – 3:34
B. "Se non ci fossi tu" (Vito Pallavicini, Mario Rusca) – 2:27

== Charts ==
Chart performance for "Sono come tu mi vuoi"
Chart (1966)	Peak position
Italy (Musica e dischi)	4

== Cover versions ==
- In 2007, Italian singer Irene Grandi recorded her version of the song, which reached ninth place in the Italian chart.
