= Città vuota =

1963 single by Mina

- Artwork for 1963 release

Single by Mina

from the album Studio Uno
- Language: Italian
- B-side: "È inutile"; "Valentino vale"
- Released: December 1963
- Genre: Pop
- Length: 2:34
- Label: Ri-Fi
- Composers: Mort Shuman; Doc Pomus
- Lyricist: Giuseppe Cassia
- Producer: Piero Gosio

Mina singles chronology
"Vulcano" (1963)	"Città vuota" (1963)	"A volte" (1964)

"Città vuota" (Italian: [tʃitˌta vˈvwɔːta]; transl. "Empty City") is a song recorded by Italian singer Mina in 1963, an Italian version of "It's a Lonely Town" by Gene McDaniels. The song was originally written by Doc Pomus and Mort Shuman, and was adapted by Giuseppe Cassia.

== Original version ==
It was the singer's first single on the Ri-Fi label. After the release, the song quickly became popular and rose to number three on the Italian singles chart. The songs "È inutile" (written by Ricky Gianco and Gian Pieretti) and "Valentino vale" (by Vittorio Buffoli and Vito Pallavicini) were used as a b-side. Mina also recorded Spanish version called "Ciudad solitaria".

This single marked Mina's return to television after she was banned by Italian national broadcaster RAI due to scandals related to her personal life.

== Track listing ==
7" single – 1963
A. "Città vuota" – 2:34
B1. "È inutile" (Gian Pieretti, Ricky Gianco) – 1:56
B2. "Valentino vale" (Vito Pallavicini, Vittorio Buffoli) – 2:11

7" single – 1978 (Ri-Fi)
A. "Città vuota" – 2:34
B. "Un anno d'amore" (Mogol, Alberto Testa, Nino Ferrer) – 3:10

== Charts ==
Initial chart performance for "Città vuota"
Chart (1963–1965)	Peak position
Italy (Musica e dischi)	3
Peru (La Prensa)	1

2012 chart performance for "Città vuota"
Chart (2012)	Peak position
US World Digital Songs (Billboard)	8

== 1978 remake ==
"Città vuota (It's a Lonely Town)"
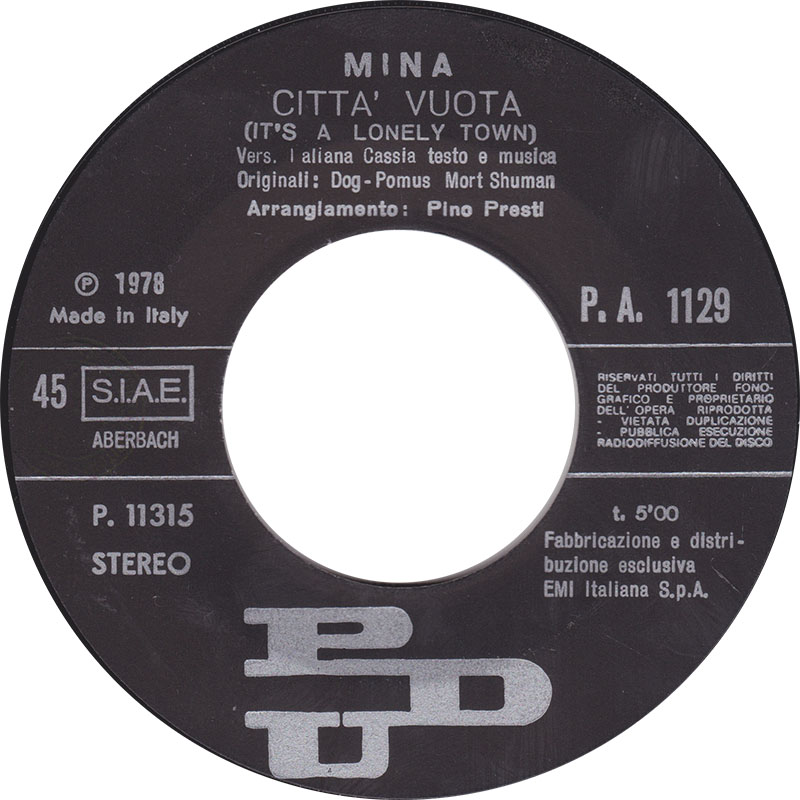

Single by Mina

from the album Live '78
- Language: Italian
- B-side: "Ancora, ancora, ancora"
- Released: May 1978
- Recorded: 12 May 1978
- Genre: Disco; jazz
- Length: 5:00
- Label: PDU
- Composers: Mort Shuman; Doc Pomus
- Lyricists: Giuseppe Cassia; Doc Pomus
- Producer: Piero Gosio

Mina singles chronology
"Giorni" (1977)	"Città vuota (It's a Lonely Town)" (1978)	"Anche un uomo" (1979)

In 1978, Mina released a disco-style remake, conceived and arranged by Pino Presti with the inclusion of a jazz part. Combined with "Ancora, ancora, ancora" (by Cristiano Malgioglio and Gian Pietro Felisatti), it became one of the most successful singles of the summer of that year, reaching number five in Italian singles chart in August. Mina performed this version during her concerts in Bussoladomani and later included it on her live album Live '78.

=== Track listing ===
7" single – 1978 (PDU)
A. "Città vuota (It's a Lonely Town)" – 5:00
B. "Ancora ancora ancora" (Cristiano Malgioglio, Gian Pietro Felisatti) – 4:19

=== Charts ===
Chart performance for "Città vuota (It's a Lonely Town)"
Chart (1978)	Peak position
Italy (Billboard)	4
Italy (Musica e dischi)	5

=== Certifications and sales ===
Certifications for "Città vuota (It's a Lonely Town)"
Region	Certification	Certified units/sales
Italy (FIMI) Sales from 2009	Gold	50,000^{‡}
^{‡} Sales+streaming figures based on certification alone.
