= Mina (1964 album) =

Studio album by Mina
- Released: May 1964
- Genre: Pop; jazz; bossa nova
- Length: 33:52
- Language: English; Italian; Portuguese; Spanish
- Label: Ri-Fi
- Producer: Vladimiro Albera

Mina studio albums chronology
Stessa spiaggia, stesso mare (1963)	Mina (1964)	Studio Uno (1965)

Mina is a studio album by Italian singer Mina, issued in 1964 through Ri-Fi.

== Overview ==
This is Mina's first album released on the new Ri-Fi label after breaking up with Italdisc. Also, for the first time, the album is not a so-called compilation of already released singles, but consists entirely of unreleased tracks. The album mainly features cover versions of famous standards in English and Portuguese, as well as the songs "E se domani" and "Non illuderti" in Italian.

The album was released in Italy in May 1964, reaching number three on the chart. The album was also released abroad, in Spain (with an alternative track listing), in Canada under the title Mina We Love You – Benvenuta in Canada, and in Latin America as Mina, l'unica (only in Brazil with the original cover and title). In 2011, the Halidon label released a remastered version of the album.

For recording the album, Mina was awarded the Oscar del disco '64 prize.

== Critical reception ==
Claudio Milano of OndaRock wrote that jazz is the main character here, and Mina makes it pleasant, but only sometimes luxurious. He especially highlighted the song "Stella by Starlight" with an orchestral arrangement combining the nobility of Duke Ellington and the rhythmic vivacity of Latin American music. Mina, in his opinion, interprets the song with excellent tonal lightness, elegance and absolute mastery of intervals, which lead her from the middle frequencies to brilliant peaks rich in timbral and harmonic nuances. In 2015, the magazine Panorama named the album one of the ten essential albums by Mina.

== Track listing ==
Side A
No.	Title	Writer(s)	Length
1.	"The Nearness of You"	Hoagy Carmichael; Ned Washington	2:38
2.	"Angel Eyes"	Matt Dennis; Earl Brent	2:24
3.	"Nadie me ama (Ninguém me ama)"	Fernando Lobo; Antônio Maria; Giancarlo Testoni	2:47
4.	"La barca"	Roberto Cantoral	3:09
5.	"Stella by Starlight"	Victor Young; Washington	2:26
6.	"Insensatez"	Antônio Carlos Jobim; Vinícius de Moraes	2:37
Total length:			16:01

Side B
No.	Title	Writer(s)	Length
1.	"E se domani"	Giorgio Calabrese; Carlo Alberto Rossi	3:08
2.	"Non illuderti"	Michelino Rizza; Berto Pisano	2:55
3.	"Sabor a mí"	Álvaro Carrillo Alarcón	3:01
4.	"You Go to My Head"	J. Fred Coots; Haven Gillespie	2:53
5.	"Stars Fell on Alabama"	Mitchell Parish; Frank Perkins	3:16
6.	"Everything Happens to Me"	Tom Adair; Matt Dennis	2:38
Total length:			17:51

== Charts ==
Chart performance for Mina
Chart (1964)	Peak position
Italian Albums (Musica e dischi)	3

== Cover versions ==
Over the years, Mina re-recorded some of the songs of this album. In 1988, she sang again "E se domani" for her compilation album Oggi ti amo di più. In 1993 and in 2012, she made a new cover of "Everything Happens to Me" (respectively in Lochness and in 12 (American Song Book)). In 2005, in her tribute album to Frank Sinatra, L'allieva, she sang again the standards "The Nearness of You" and "Angel Eyes", while - in 1964 - she made a Spanish version of "E se domani" under the title of "Y si mañana".
