= Ancora, ancora, ancora =

- Cover art for French release

Song by Mina
- Language: Italian
- A-side: "Città vuota (It's a Lonely Town)"
- Released: May 1978
- Recorded: 1978
- Studio: La Basilica, Milan
- Genre: Pop
- Length: 4:19
- Label: PDU
- Composer: Gian Pietro Felisatti
- Lyricist: Cristiano Malgioglio
- Producer: Alberto Nicorelli

Music video
- "Ancora, ancora, ancora" on YouTube

"Ancora, ancora, ancora" (English: Again, again, again) is a song recorded by Italian singer Mina in 1978. It was written by Gian Pietro Felisatti and Cristiano Malgioglio.

== Overview ==
According to Cristiano Malgioglio, he originally wrote one song for Mina, but at the meeting she rejected it and asked him to write something more "hot" for her. In the evening, entangled in a creative crisis, Malgioglio unexpectedly received a phone call from his former lover, who asked: "And you, do you still love me?". Malgioglio answered "Yes". Another in response: "Tell me that again, again, again." The lyrics were recorded in just two minutes and the very next day he handed it to Mina in the recording studio.

Mina at the last moment chooses this song with provocative lyrics as the final theme of the television program Mille e una luce instead of the very popular new version of "Città vuota (It's a Lonely Town)". She also specifically shoots the music video because it's her only appearance on the show. However, the song falls under censorship, this time not so much because of Malgioglio's lyrics, but because of the performance, recognized as overly sensual, and because of the candid video shot in close-up. After the airing of the first episode of the show, the original video was rewired in subsequent ones, narrowing the frame and duplicating it on many small mini-screens to avoid eye-catching juicy details.

The song was released as a single in 1978 for the first time together with a remake of "Città vuota (It's a Lonely Town)" and managed to reach number four on the Italian chart. The live version of the song was included in the album Mina Live '78 (1978), and the studio version was published on the compilation Del mio meglio numero sette (1983).

In September 2023, on the occasion of the first fashion show organized by the new creative director of Gucci, Sabato De Sarno, British musician Mark Ronson produced a remix of "Ancora, ancora, ancora". The single was then released on radio and streaming platforms in October of the same year.

== Track listing ==
7" single – 1978 (PDU)
A. "Città vuota (It's a Lonely Town)" (Giuseppe Cassia, Doc Pomus, Mort Shuman) – 5:00
B. "Ancora, ancora, ancora" – 4:19

Digital download and streaming – 2023 (Warner)
1. "Ancora, ancora, ancora" (Extended version) [Mark Ronson] Remix] – 5:45
2. "Ancora, ancora, ancora" (Radio edit) [Mark Ronson Remix] – 4:16

== Charts ==
1978 chart performance for "Ancora, ancora, ancora"
| Chart (1978) | Peak position |
|---|---|
| Italy (Billboard) | 4 |
| Italy (Musica e dischi) | 4 |

2023 chart performance for "Ancora, ancora, ancora" (Remix)
| Chart (2023) | Peak position |
|---|---|
| Italy (FIMI) | 60 |

== Certifications and sales ==
Certifications for "Ancora, ancora, ancora"
| Region | Certification | Certified units/sales |
|---|---|---|
| Italy (FIMI) sales from 2009 | Platinum | 100,000^{‡} |
^{‡} Sales+streaming figures based on certification alone.

== Cover versions ==
- In 2000, Mónica Naranjo performed a cover version of the song in Spanish called "Ahora, ahora" to the words of José Manuel Navarro, it was released by Epic Records first as a single, and then as part of an album Minage.
- Irish singer Róisín Murphy recorded Italian version for her EP Mi Senti in 2014.
- American singer Liza Minnelli wanted to record an English version of the song or record this song in a duet with Mina, but the collaboration never took place.
