= 12 (American Song Book) =

Studio album by Mina
- Released: 4 December 2012
- Genre: Jazz
- Length: 49:07
- Label: GSU/PDU; Sony
- Producer: Massimiliano Pani

Mina chronology
Piccolino (2011)	12 (American Song Book) (2012)	Christmas Song Book (2013)

Singles from 12 (American Song Book)
- 1. "Over the Rainbow" Released: 23 November 2012; 2. "Have Yourself a Merry Little Christmas" Released: 19 December 2012

12 (American Song Book) is a studio album by Italian singer Mina, released on 4 December 2012 by GSU/PDU and Sony Music.

== Overview ==
In the album, Mina covers 12 standards of American music, originally published between 1930 ("Just a Gigolo") and 1970 ("Fire and Rain"). Among the others, she sings "Everything Happens to Me" for the third time (previously recorded in 1964 for the album Mina and in 1993 for Lochness) and "Love Me Tender" for the second time (previously covered for the 1991 album Caterpillar).

The album was produced by Mina's son, Massimiliano Pani. It was recorded in the studio with the participation of an orchestra, some of the musicians are long-time friends of the singer: Danilo Rea (piano), Alfredo Golino (drums), Massimo Moriconi (double bass) and Gianni Ferrio (string arrangement).

In the first edition of the album, 12 different covers were released.

The album was preceded by the single "Over the Rainbow" released on 23 November 2012. The second single "Have Yourself a Merry Little Christmas" was released on 19 December, on the occasion of the Christmas holidays.

== Track listing ==
No.	Title	Writer(s)	Length
1.	"September Song"	Kurt Weill; Maxwell Anderson	2:48
2.	"Banana Split for My Baby"	Louis Prima; Stan Irwin	3:18
3.	"Everything Happens to Me"	Matt Dennis; Tom Adair	3:15
4.	"Fire and Rain"	James Taylor	4:45
5.	"Have Yourself a Merry Little Christmas"	Ralph Blane; Hugh Martin	4:00
6.	"I'll Be Seeing You"	Sammy Fain; Irving Kahal	5:48
7.	"I'm Glad There Is You"	Jimmy Dorsey; Paul Madeira	4:25
8.	"I've Got You Under My Skin"	Cole Porter	2:48
9.	"Just a Gigolo"	Leonello Casucci; Irving Caesar	3:28
10.	"Love Me Tender"	Elvis Presley; Vera Matson	4:36
11.	"Over the Rainbow"	Harold Arlen; Edward Yip Harburg	6:00
12.	"Anytime, Anywhere"	Mary Imogene Carpenter; Lenny Adelson	3:57
Total length:			49:07

== Charts ==
=== Weekly charts ===
Weekly chart performance for 12 (American Song Book)
Chart (2012–2013)	Peak position
Greek Albums (IFPI)	42
Italian Albums (FIMI)	6

=== Year-end charts ===
Year-end chart performance for 12 (American Song Book)
Chart (2012)	Position
Italian Albums (FIMI)	48

== Certifications ans sales ==
Certifications for 12 (American Song Book)
Region	Certification	Certified units/sales
Italy (FIMI)	Gold	30,000^{*}
^{*} Sales figures based on certification alone.
