= Frank Pearce Sturm =

English poet and translator (1879–1942)

Frank Pearce Sturm (1879–1942) was an English poet and translator, known for his 1906 translations of Baudelaire; his short poem Still-heart is a popular favourite.

During the 1920s he was a collaborator and correspondent of W. B. Yeats, particularly in matters of astrology.
