= È l'uomo per me =

Single by Mina

from the album Studio Uno
- Language: Italian
- B-side: "So che non è così"
- Released: March 1964
- Genre: Pop
- Length: 2:20
- Label: Ri-Fi
- Composer: Diane Hildebrand
- Lyricists: Gaspare Gabriele Abbate; Vito Pallavicini

Mina singles chronology
"A volte" (1964)	"È l'uomo per me" (1964)	"Fremdes Land" (1964)

"È l'uomo per me" (English: "He's the One Man for Me") is a song by Italian singer Mina. The song is an Italian-language cover of the song "He Walks Like a Man" (1964) by American country singer Jody Miller. The music was written by Diane Hildebrand, and the Italian lyrics was written by Gaspare Gabriele Abbate and Vito Pallavicini. The song was released as a single and reached the top of the Italian chart, spending seven consecutive weeks at number one. The song "So che non e così" was used as the B-side.

Mina recorded Spanish versions of both songs under the titles "Mi hombre será" ("È l'uomo per me") and "Se que no es así" ("So che non e così"). Later, both songs were included in the EP Canta en Español released in Spain.

== Track listing ==
7" single
A. "È l'uomo per me" – 2:20
B. "So che non è così" (Alberto Testa, Augusto Martelli, Bruno Martelli) – 2:18

== Charts ==
Chart performance for "È l'uomo per me"
Chart (1964)	Peak position
Italy (Musica e dischi)	1
