= Se telefonando =

"Se telefonando..."

Single by Mina

from the album Studio Uno 66
- Language: Italian
- B-side: "No"
- Released: May 1966
- Genre: Pop
- Length: 2:58
- Label: Ri-Fi
- Composer: Ennio Morricone
- Lyricists: Maurizio Costanzo; Ghigo De Chiara
- Producer: Ennio Morricone

Mina singles chronology
"Una casa in cima al mondo" (1966)	"Se telefonando..." (1966)	"Breve amore" (1966)

Music video
- "Se telefonando..." on YouTube

"Se telefonando" (transl. "If, by calling on the telephone") is a song performed by Italian singer Mina, released in May 1966. The music was composed, orchestrated and conducted by Ennio Morricone to Italian lyrics by Ghigo De Chiara and Maurizio Costanzo. The song was written for an episode of the Sunday morning TV programme "Aria condizionata" ("Air conditioning").

It was a standout track of Mina's Studio Uno 66, the fifth-biggest-selling album of the year 1966 in Italy, which sold over a million copies worldwide.

Morricone's sophisticated arrangement of "Se telefonando" combined melodic trumpet lines, Hal Blaine-style drumming, a string set, a '60s Europop female choir, and intensive subsonic-sounding trombones. The main theme of the song thrills around just three notes, taken from the siren of a police car in Marseille. The Italian hit parade #7 song featured eight transitions of tonality building tension throughout the chorus. In late 1966, Mina recorded an English version of the song for United Artists' release in English-speaking countries.

In the reader's poll conducted by the la Repubblica newspaper to celebrate Mina's 70th anniversary in 2010, 30,000 voters picked the track as the best song ever recorded by Mina.

== Charts ==
Initial chart performance for "Se telefonando..."
Chart (1966)	Peak position
Italy (Musica e dischi)	11

2011 chart performance for "Se telefonando"
Chart (2011)	Peak position
Italy (FIMI)	91

== Certifications and sales ==
Certifications for "Se telefonando..."
Region	Certification	Certified units/sales
Italy (FIMI)	Platinum	70,000^{‡}
^{‡} Sales+streaming figures based on certification alone.

== Cover versions ==
During the following decades, the song was covered by several performers in Italy and abroad, most notably by Françoise Hardy (in French "Je changerais d'avis" and in English "I Will Change My Life"), Iva Zanicchi (1966), Orietta Berti (2003), Delta V (2005), Claudio Baglioni, Vanessa and the O's (2007), Neil Hannon (2008), Cheryl Porter (2008) and Etta Scollo (2011).

In February 2015, the Italian singer Nek won with his cover of "Se telefonando" the award for "Best Cover" during the Sanremo Music Festival 2015. Nek's version of the song sold over 50,000 copies in Italy. On November of the same year, Franco Battiato also inserted his own cover of the song in the album Anthology – Le nostre anime.
