= E se domani =

Song by Mina

from the album Mina
- Released: 1964
- Length: 3:04
- Label: Ri-Fi
- Songwriter(s): Giorgio Calabrese, Carlo Alberto Rossi

Audio
- "E se domani" on YouTube

"E se domani" ('And if tomorrow') is a 1964 Italian song composed by Carlo Alberto Rossi (music) and Giorgio Calabrese (lyrics). It premiered at the 14th edition of the Sanremo Music Festival with a double performance by Fausto Cigliano and Gene Pitney, and was brought to success by Mina.

== Overview ==
The song was entered into the main competition Sanremo Music Festival 1964. Before being assigned to Fausto Cigliano and Gene Pitney, Mia Martini was considered as a possible performer. Suffering from "pompous and banal arrangements", the song was eliminated from the competition, in what music critic Dario Salvatori described as "one of the most striking artistic blunders in the history of the festival".

A few months later, Carlo Alberto Rossi convinced Mina, who needed a song to wrap up her album, to record it. Mina's version eventually became a classic, with the song later recorded in more than a hundred cover versions. Mina also recorded the song in Spanish as "Y si mañana". Artists who covered the song include Dalida, Julio Iglesias, Amii Stewart, Giuseppe Di Stefano, Natalino Otto, Morgana King, Nilla Pizzi, Fausto Papetti, Lara Saint Paul, and Marisa Terzi.
