= Carlo Alberto Rossi =

Italian composer and record producer

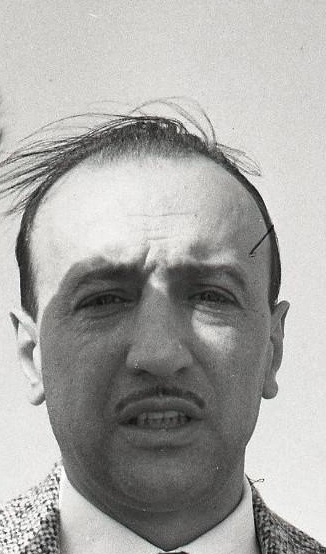
- Born: 30 August 1921; Rimini, Italy
- Died: 12 April 2010 (aged 88); Milan, Italy
- Occupations: Composer; Record producer

Carlo Alberto Rossi (30 August 1921 – 12 April 2010) was an Italian composer and record producer.

== Life and career ==
Born in Rimini, when he was 8 years old, Rossi started performing as a child actor and singer in operettas. In 1936, he moved with his family to Milan, where he studied at the Giuseppe Verdi Conservatory and formed a vocal ensamble, I Barboni. In 1939, he made his professional debut as a songwriter with "Tango di Manuelita". During World War II, he served as an official in the infantry, also composing some military anthems and a musical comedy.

After the war, Rossi began a full-time career as a composer; among his early hits were Natalino Otto's “Conosci mia cugina” and “Non ho più pace”, and Lidia Martorana's "Amore baciami", which saw renewed success revamped in the early 1960s thanks to a Pat Boone cover version. In 1949, he co-founded Ariston Group with his brother Alfredo and Ladislao Sugar. In 1955, he left Ariston to found the label C.A. Edizioni, and in 1958 he founded another record company, CAR Juke Box, and a recording and dubbing studio, Fonorama. He also ran two discotheques, Whisky Juke Box in Rimini and Tropicana Club in Ferrara. He retired in 1974.

Starting from its first edition in 1951, Rossi was a protagonist of the Sanremo Music Festival; among the hit songs he launched in the festival were Carla Boni's "Acque amare", Milva's "Stanotte al Luna Park", Joe Sentieri's "Quando vien la sera", Mina's "Le mille bolle blu", as well as Gene Pitney/Fausto Cigliano's "E se domani" and Peppino Gagliardi/Pat Boone's "Se tu non fossi qui", which were initially ignored before being brought to success by cover versions of Mina. Rossi's hits also include the Canzone Napoletana classic "'Na voce, 'na chitarra e 'o poco 'e luna", Jula De Palma's "Mon Pays", Teddy Reno's "Trieste mia", Peppino di Capri's "Nun è peccato", Ornella Vanoni's "Fra tanta gente".
