= Studio Uno (TV series) =

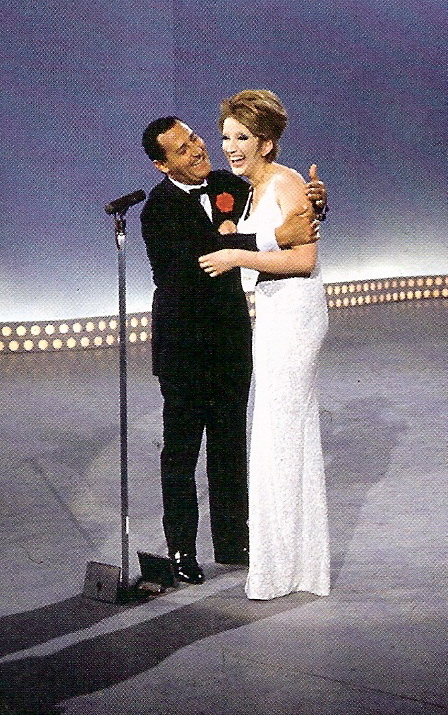
- Alberto Sordi and Mina on Studio Uno, 1966
- Genre: Variety show
- Created by: Antonello Falqui; Guido Sacerdote
- Directed by: Antonello Falqui
- Country of origin: Italy
- Original language: Italian
- No. of seasons: 4
- No. of episodes: 56

Production
- Production company: RAI

Original release
- Network: Programma Nazionale
- Release: October 21, 1961 – June 25, 1966

Studio Uno ("Studio One") is an Italian Saturday night variety show, broadcast on Rai 1 (at the time Programma Nazionale) between 1961 and 1966. It is considered one of the most innovative shows on Italian television at the time. This show marked the debut of Mina as television presenter, as well as the breakout of Kessler Twins and Don Lurio.

Created and directed by Antonello Falqui, it was conceived by Falqui during a trip to the United States he made with the then RAI president Sergio Pugliese, and was inspired by Broadway theatre and by Fred Astaire and Ginger Rogers' musical films. For this reason, together with Don Lurio and a young Gino Landi, longtime Fred Astaire collaborator Hermes Pan was chosen as choreographer. The show has been described as 'characterized by a perfect equilibrium between comical sketches, songs, ballets and guests'. During the show Kesslers and Don Lurio launched the song "Da-da-un-pa". Bruno Canfora served as conductor in all the editions of the show.

C'era una volta Studio Uno ("Once upon a time Studio Uno"), a television miniseries inspired by the show, was broadcast in 2017; it stars Alessandra Mastronardi, Giusy Buscemi, Diana Del Bufalo and Edoardo Pesce as Falqui.

== Editions ==
Year	Episodes	Broadcasting dates	Writers	Cast
1961–1962	12	21 October – 13 January	Guido Sacerdote, Dino Verde	Mina, Marcel Amont, Kessler Twins, Bluebell Girls, Don Lurio, Quartetto Cetra, Mac Ronay, Renata Mauro, Emilio Pericoli
1962–1963	12	22 December – 16 March	Antonello Falqui, Guido Sacerdote, Dino Verde	Walter Chiari, Zizi Jeanmaire, Quartetto Cetra, Don Lurio, Bluebell Girls, Rita Pavone, Giancarlo Cobelli, Dany Saval
1965	12	13 February – 1 May	Antonello Falqui, Guido Sacerdote, Castellano e Pipolo	Mina, Luciano Salce, Lelio Luttazzi, Paolo Panelli, Milly, Kessler Twins
1966	20	12 February – 25 June	Antonello Falqui, Guido Sacerdote, Lina Wertmüller	Lelio Luttazzi, Sandra Milo, Luciano Salce, Ornella Vanoni, Rita Pavone, Kessler Twins, Mina, Romolo Valli, Franca Valeri, Caterina Caselli
