= Mina (Italian singer) =

Italian singer (born 1940)

Mina Grand Officer OMRI
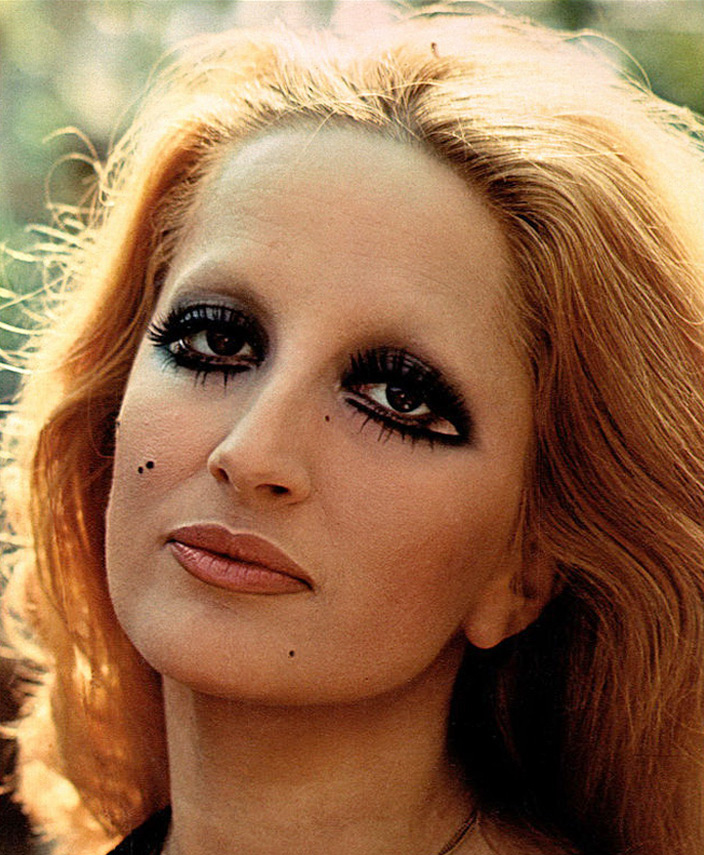
- Mina in 1972
- Born: Mina Anna Mazzini (Note: Birth name often reported as Anna Maria Mazzini.); 25 March 1940 (age 86); Busto Arsizio, Lombardy, Kingdom of Italy
- Other names: Anna Maria Mazzini; Mina Anna Quaini; Anna Maria Quaini
- Citizenship: Italy; Switzerland
- Occupations: Singer; actress; television presenter
- Spouses: Virgilio Crocco (m. 1970; died 1973); Eugenio Quaini (m. 2006)
- Partners: Corrado Pani (1962–1965); Augusto Martelli (c. 1965–1970)
- Children: 2, including Massimiliano Pani
- Musical career
- Also known as: "The Tigress of Cremona"; Baby Gate; "the Queen of Screamers"
- Origin: Cremona, Lombardy, Italy
- Genres: Pop; blues; jazz; swing; rhythm and blues; rock and roll; canzone napoletana; bossa nova; dance
- Works: Albums; singles; all songs
- Years active: 1958–present
- Labels: Italdisc; Ri-Fi; PDU; EMI; Warner
- Website: mina.music

Mina Anna Mazzini (by marriage Quaini on the Swiss civil registry; born 25 March 1940), known mononymously as Mina, is an Italian singer and former actress. She was a staple of television variety shows and a dominant figure in Italian pop and rock and roll music from the late 1950s to the mid-1970s, known for her three-octave vocal range, the agility of her soprano voice, and her image as an emancipated woman.

In performance, Mina combined several modern styles with traditional Italian melodies and swing music, which made her one of the most versatile pop singers in Italian music. With over 150 million records sold worldwide, she is the best-selling Italian musical artist as well as one of the best-selling music artists of all time. Mina dominated the country's charts for 15 years and reached an unsurpassed level of popularity. She has scored 79 albums and 71 singles on the Italian charts.

Mina's TV appearances in 1959 were the first for a female rock and roll singer in Italy. Her loud, syncopated singing earned her the nickname "Queen of Screamers". The public also labelled her the "Tigress of Cremona", after her hometown and her wild gestures and body shakes. When she turned to light pop tunes, Mina's chart-toppers in West Germany in 1962 and Japan in 1964 earned her the title of the best international artist in these countries. Mina's more refined sensual manner was introduced in 1960 with Gino Paoli's ballad "Il cielo in una stanza", which charted on the Billboard Hot 100 in 1961 as "This World We Love In".

Mina was banned from TV and radio in 1963 because her pregnancy from and relationship with married actor Corrado Pani did not accord with the dominant Catholic and bourgeois morals. After the ban, the public broadcasting service RAI tried to continue to prohibit her songs, which were forthright in dealing with subjects such as religion, smoking and sex. Mina's cool act combined sex appeal with public smoking, dyed blonde hair, and shaved eyebrows to create a "bad girl" image. She gave up public appearances in 1978, but has continued to release popular albums and musical projects on a yearly basis to the present day.

Mina's voice has a distinctive timbre and great power. Her main themes are anguished love stories performed in high dramatic tones. The singer combined classic Italian pop with elements of blues, R&B and soul music during the late 1960s, especially when she worked in collaboration with the singer-songwriter Lucio Battisti. Top Italian songwriters created material with large vocal ranges and unusual chord progressions to showcase her singing skills, particularly "Brava" by Bruno Canfora (1965) and the pseudo-serial "Se telefonando" by Ennio Morricone (1966). The latter song was covered by several performers abroad. Shirley Bassey carried Mina's ballad "Grande grande grande" to the charts in the U.S., UK, and other English-speaking countries in 1973. Mina's easy listening duet "Parole parole" was turned into a worldwide hit by Dalida and Alain Delon in 1974. Her 1982 disco single "Morirò per te" entered in the Billboard Hot Dance/Disco Top 100.

== Early life ==
Mina Anna Mazzini was born into a working-class family in Busto Arsizio, in the region of Lombardy. The family moved to work in Cremona, Lombardy, in her childhood. She listened to American rock and roll and jazz records and was a frequent visitor at the Santa Tecla and the Taverna Messicana clubs of Milan, both known for promoting rock and roll. After finishing high school in 1958, she attended college, where she majored in accounting.

== Career ==
=== Queen of Screamers (1958–1961) ===
While on a summer holiday in Versilia on 8 August 1958, Mazzini gave an improvised performance of the song "Un'anima tra le mani" to amuse her family after a concert at the La Bussola night club. During the following nights, Sergio Bernardini, the owner of the club, held her back in her attempts to get back on stage.

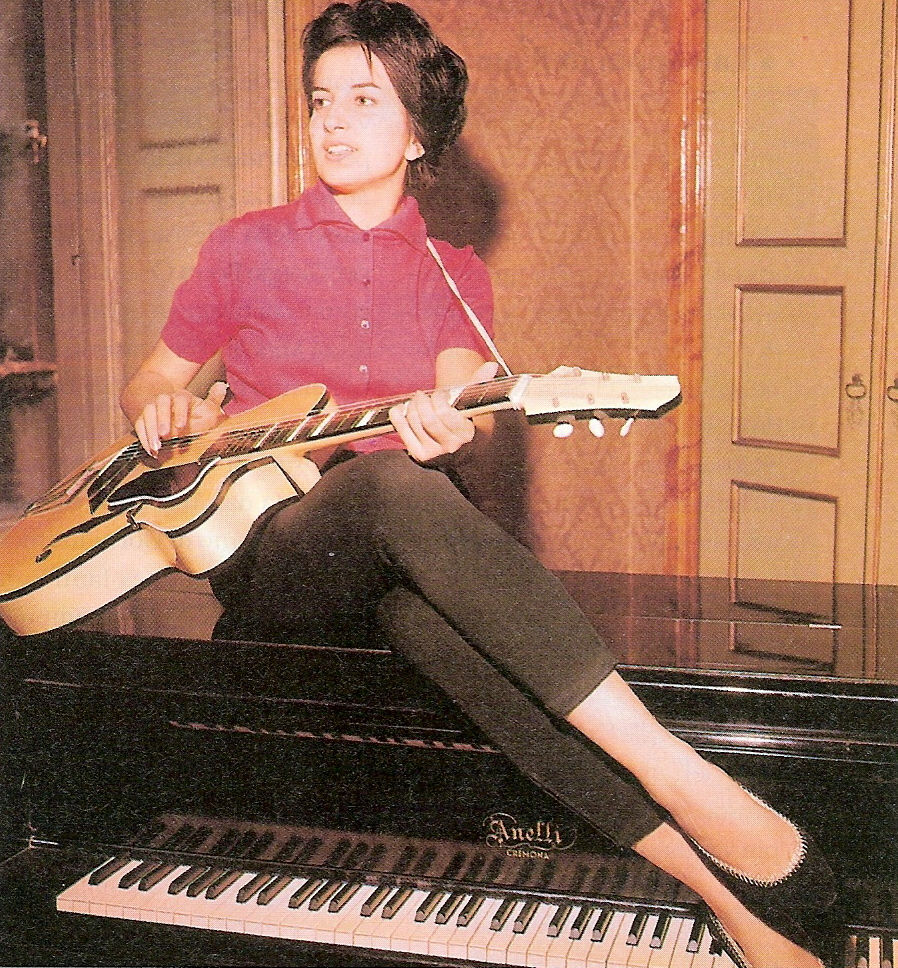
Mina with her Anelli piano and a Giemmei guitar at home in Cremona, 1959

In September, she started her solo career with the backing of the band Happy Boys. Her concert in September 1958, before an audience of 2,500 people at the Theatre of Rivarolo del Re, won enthusiastic approval from local critics. She soon signed with Davide Matalon, owner of the small record company Italdisc. Her first single, "Non partir"/"Malatia", was produced under the stage name Mina for the Italian audience. Simultaneously, "Be Bop A Lula"/"When" was issued under the name Baby Gate for the international audience. Baby was chosen as a contrast to her 178 cm (5 ft 10 in) height – exceptionally tall for an Italian woman – and Gate as a tribute to The Golden Gate Quartet. In December, her performance at the Sei giorni della canzone festival of Milan was described by the La Notte newspaper as the "birth of a star". It was Mina's last performance with the Happy Boys, as her family refused to let her skip college for a scheduled tour of Turkey.

Less than a month after the breakup with her previous band, Mina co-founded a new group called Solitari, which consisted of a singer, a saxophonist, a pianist, a contrabassist, and a guitarist. Her first hit with the band featured Mina performing an extra-loud, syncopated version of the popular song "Nessuno" ("Nobody"), which she performed at the first rock festival in the Milan Ice Palace in February 1959. Performances of the song on the TV game shows Lascia o raddoppia? and Il musichiere on 1 March and 4 April were hailed by Italian critics. The starlet signed with Elio Gigante, an experienced artist manager. In the following years, he organized her performances in the grand ballrooms of Italy. Her first Italian No. 1 hit was the up-tempo "Tintarella di luna" ("Moon Tan") in September 1959, which was performed in her first musicarello (musical comedy film), Juke box – Urli d'amore. In late 1959, Matalon had her drop the name Baby Gate in favour of Mina.

=== Growing up (1960–1965) ===
In 1960, Mina made her Festival della canzone italiana debut in Sanremo with two songs. She turned to slow emotional love songs for the first time. The song "È vero" ("It's True") reached No. 4 on the Italian charts. Gino Paoli's song "Il cielo in una stanza" ("The Sky in a Room") marked the beginning of the young singer's transformation from a rock and roll shrieker to a feminine inspiration for cantautori. The idea for the song "Love can grow at any moment at any place" had come to Paoli while lying on a bed and looking at the purple ceiling. The single topped the list of annual sales in Italy and reached the Billboard Hot 100 as "This World We Love In". Video performances of the song were included in the musicarellos Io bacio... tu baci and Appuntamento a Ischia, and in 1990, in the soundtrack of the film Goodfellas.

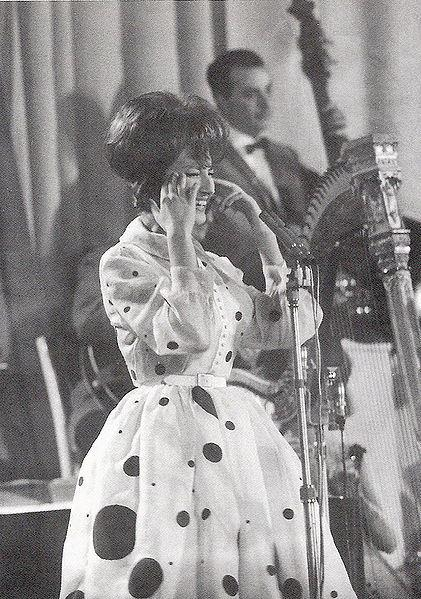
Mina performing at Sanremo Music Festival in 1961

At the 1961 Sanremo Song Festival, Mina performed two songs. "Io amo, tu ami" ("I Love, You Love") finished fourth and "Le mille bolle blu" ("A Thousand Blue Bubbles") placed fifth. Greatly disappointed by this, Mina declared her intention of never performing at the Sanremo song festival again.

As her songs and movies were already popular abroad, Mina started to tour Spain and Japan, and performed on Venezuelan TV in 1961. Mina performed on Spanish TV and at the Paris Olympia hall at the beginning of 1962. The presentation of her German single "Heißer Sand" on 12 March 1962 on Peter Kraus's TV show caused a boom of 40,000 record sales in ten days in Germany. The record went to No. 1 and spent over half the year on the German charts in 1962. Mina had six more singles on the German chart in the next two years. In a listeners' poll conducted in July 1962 in Germany, Austria, and the German-speaking portion of Switzerland, Mina was voted the most popular singer in the world. In May 1962, she performed in Buenos Aires. Meanwhile, her version of the mambo rhythm "Moliendo cafe" and the surf pop "Renato" peaked at No. 1 and No. 4 respectively on the Italian charts. "L'eclisse twist" appeared on the flip side of "Renato", and was used on the soundtrack of Michelangelo Antonioni's feature film Eclipse.

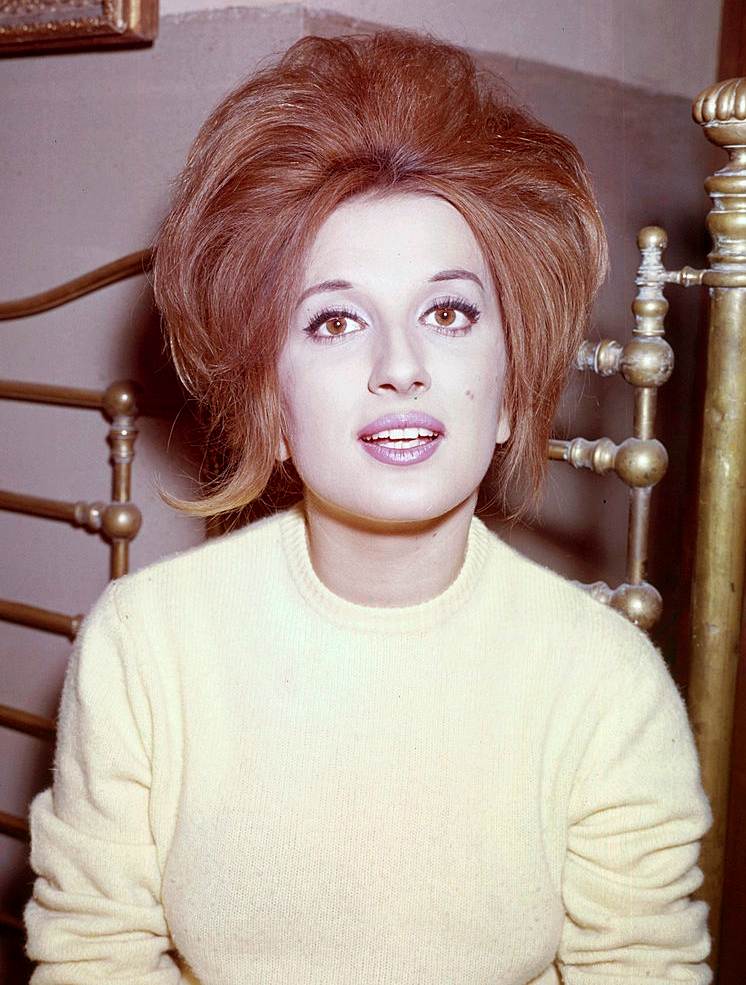
Mina in the early 1960s

Mina refused to cover up her relationship and resulting pregnancy with the married actor Corrado Pani, so her TV and radio career was interrupted by the Italian public broadcasting service RAI in 1963, as at the time, divorce was not yet legal in Italy. Mina's record sales were unaffected and due to public demand, RAI ended the ban. On 10 January 1964, she returned to the TV screen on the program La fiera dei sogni, and performed the song "Città vuota", a cover of Gene McDaniels' "It's a Lonely Town (Lonely Without You)", which was her first release on the RiFi label. Her next single, "È l'uomo per me", a cover of Jody Miller's "He Walks Like a Man", became the biggest-selling record of the year in Italy. Her new melodic manner was demonstrated again on the 11 December 1964 TV programme Il macchiettario, where she performed "Io sono quel che sono" ("I Am What I Am"). A reminder of her previous adolescent image, her single "Suna ni kieta namida" ("Tears Disappear in the Sand"), sung in Japanese, peaked at No. 1 on the Japanese singles chart and earned Mina the title of Best International Artist in Japan.

The first episode of the Studio Uno live Saturday night series showcased Mina's new blonde look with shaved eyebrows. The shows included the brooding songs "Un bacio è troppo poco" ("One Kiss is Not Enough") and "Un anno d'amore" ("A Year of Love"), a cover of Nino Ferrer's "C'est irreparable". In the same series, she performed "Brava" ("Good"), a rhythmic jazz number specially written by Bruno Canfora to demonstrate Mina's vocal range and performing skills. Her Studio Uno album topped the Italian chart that year. Her recordings of 1965 included the scatting performance of "Spirale Waltz", the theme song for the film The 10th Victim.

=== Independence (1966–1968) ===
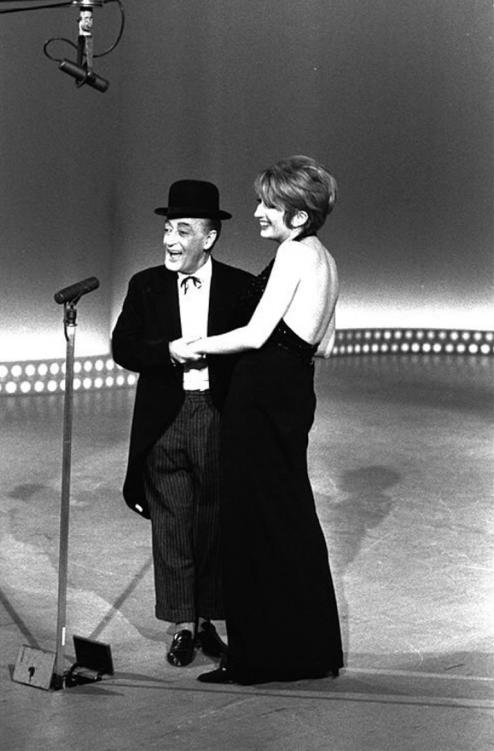
Mina with Totò on Studio Uno, 1966

Maurizio Costanzo and Ghigo De Chiara wrote the lyrics of "Se telefonando" ("If Over the Phone") as the theme for the TV program Aria condizionata in spring 1966. The lyrics were composed in a dark, Hal David mode. The serialist composer Ennio Morricone was asked to compose the music. Mina and the three songwriters met in an RAI rehearsal room at Via Teulada, Rome. Morricone started to repeat a short musical theme of just three notes (by his term a micro-cell) on an upright piano. He had copied the snippet of melody from the siren of a police car in Marseilles. After a few bars, Mina grabbed the lyrics sheet and started to sing as if she had known the tune before. Composed in this way, "Se telefonando" is a pop song with eight transitions of tonality that builds tension throughout the chorus. Morricone's arrangement featured a sophisticated combination of melodic trumpet lines, Hal Blaine-style drumming, a string set, a 1960s Europop female choir, and intense subsonic-sounding trombones.

"Se telefonando" was presented in May 1966 in a Studio Uno episode and in August the same year at Aria condizionata. The single peaked at No. 11 on the Italian chart and was 53rd in the annual list of sales. The album Studio Uno 66 featured the song as one of the standout tracks along with "Ta-ra-ta-ta" and "Una casa in cima al mondo". It was the fifth biggest-selling album of the year in Italy.

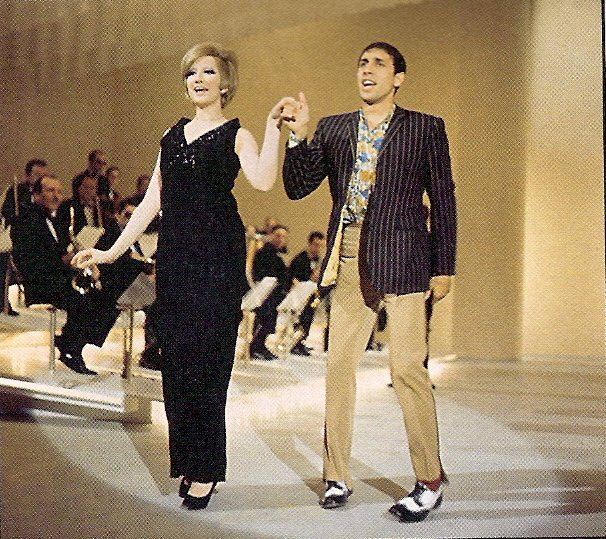
Mina and Adriano Celentano in 1967

In 1966, Mina started working with the Swiss Broadcasting Service and the Orchestra Radiosa in Lugano. She founded the independent record label PDU in collaboration with her father. The first record issued under the label was Dedicato a mio padre (Dedicated to My Father). Mina's growing interest in Brazilian music resulted in "La banda" ("The Band"), a Chico Buarque song, which reached No. 2 in Italy. Mina continued to perform on Italian TV, and presented "Zum zum zum" on the spring 1967 variety series Sabato sera, accompanied by the NATO naval band. The series also included "La coppia più bella del mondo" ("The Most Beautiful Couple in the World"), a duet with Adriano Celentano. The title of the song "Sono come tu mi vuoi" ("I Am, as You Want Me to Be") was taken from Luigi Pirandello's play Come tu mi vuoi. The lyrics talk about the manic attention of the press on an artist's private life. Another hit from Sabato sera was "L'immensità" ("Immensity"), which was re-scored by Augusto Martelli and released as "La inmensidad" in Spain and Latin American countries.

RAI broadcast the third episode of Senza Rete ("Without Safety Net") live on 18 July 1968 from the Auditorio A of the corporation's regional headquarters in Naples. The program presented Mina's homage to Luigi Tenco, who had recently died. She turned his song "Se stasera sono qui" ("If I Stay Here Tonight") into a rigorous piece of soul music in the score of Pino Calvi. She celebrated the 10th anniversary of her career with a concert at La Bussola, backed by the Orchestra Augusto Martelli. The concert was recorded and issued as Mina alla Bussola dal vivo.

Canzonissima 1968 was a Saturday night prime-time variety show that aired on Rai Uno from September 1968 to January 1969. It was hosted by Mina, Walter Chiari and Paolo Panelli. The orchestrations were scored by the conductors Bruno Canfora and Augusto Martelli. "Sacumdì Sacumdà", Mina's talking and laughing version of Carlos Imperial's bossa nova "Nem Vem Que Não Tem", narrowly escaped a ban by RAI because of its irreverent lyrics. The song was performed as part of a musical fantasy, back to back with "Quelli che hanno un cuore", her intense version of "Anyone Who Had a Heart". Another interpretation of a Dionne Warwick song was "La voce del silenzio" ("Silent Voices") by Paolo Limiti and Elio Isola, presented in a live session during the show. "Niente di niente" ("Nothing at All") was her version of the Delfonics' "Break Your Promise". The series also included the songs "Fantasia", "La musica è finita" ("The Music is Over") and the elegant "Un colpo al cuore" ("Heart Attack"). "Un colpo al cuore" ended up as No. 68 on the best-selling singles chart for that year in Italy. Each show was closed by Mina singing "Vorrei che fosse amore" ("Wish It Was Love"), a piece of atmospheric music by Bruno Canfora that was No. 50 on the best-selling singles chart for 1968 in Italy. A selection of songs from the series were issued as the album Canzonissima '68.

=== Mogol–Battisti (1969–1973) ===
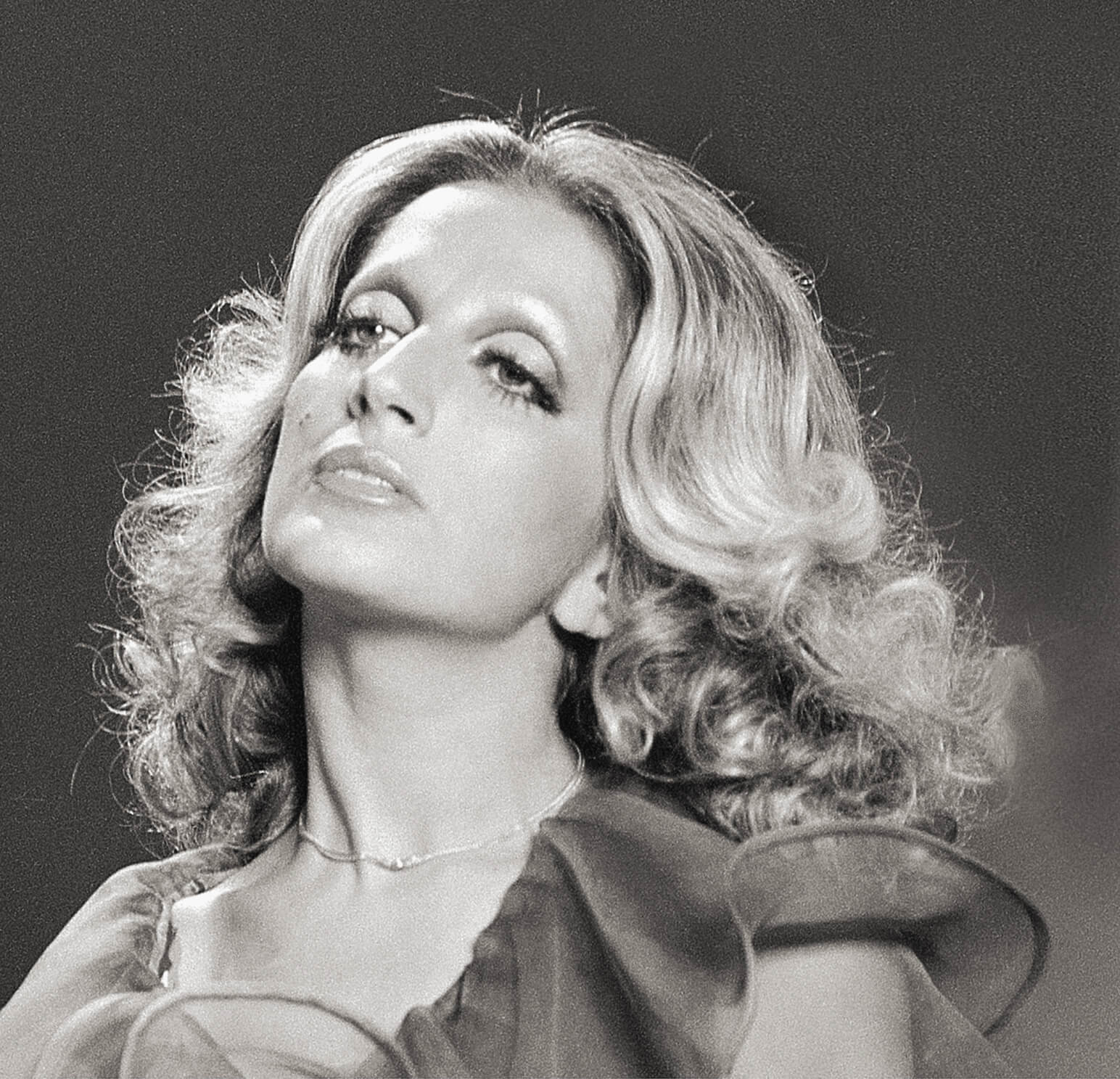
Mina in a 1970 advertisement

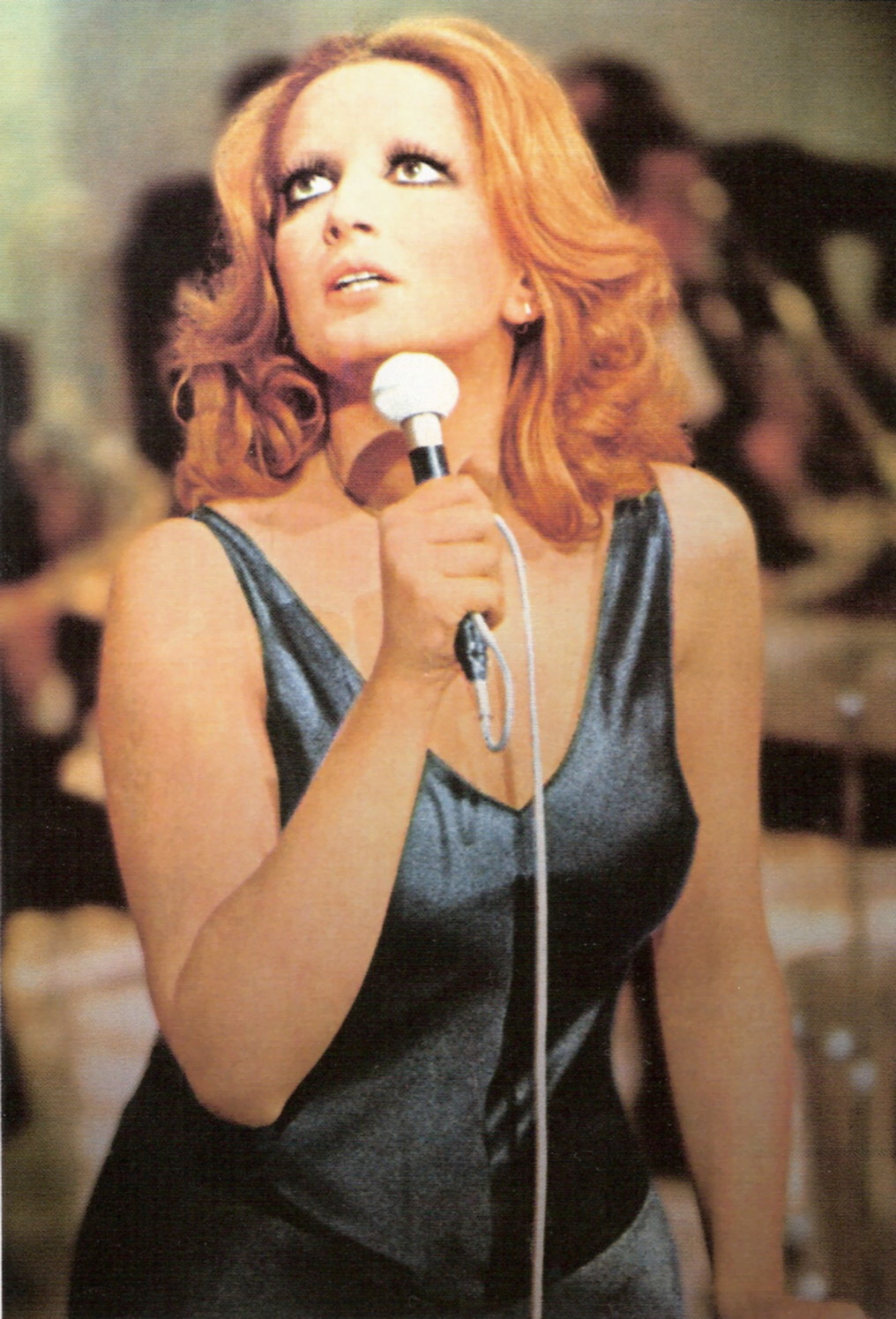
Mina on the Teatro 10 television programme in 1972

After a break of three months, Mina returned and recorded the song "Non credere" ("Disbelieve"), composed by Luigi Clausetti and Pietro Soffici, with lyrics by Mogol, in April. The single became the third biggest-selling record of the year in Italy. Mogol and his fellow composer Lucio Battisti, along with the Premiata Forneria Marconi on backup instrumentals, worked with Mina on several songs as a result of the success of "Non credere". The team produced a set of songs including "Io e te da soli" ("You and Me Alone"), "Insieme" ("Together"), "Amor mio" ("Love of Mine"), "Io vivrò senza te" ("I'll Live without You"). " One of the first introductions of the new repertoire was the Senza Rete live televised concert from the Auditorio A in Naples on 20 January 1970. The material provided by Mogol–Battisti was the core for five albums. Among them, ...bugiardo più che mai... più incosciente che mai... was Mina's first independent album to reach No. 1 of the weekly Italian charts and was the biggest-selling album of 1969 in Italy. ...quando tu mi spiavi in cima a un batticuore... was seventh on the annual record chart of 1970. Del mio meglio... (My Best...) was second in 1971. Mina was the biggest seller of 1972. The latter two albums were recorded during a break from live performances to give birth to her daughter, Benedetta.

Mina's comeback took place at RAI's variety series Teatro 10 in the spring of 1972. One of the highlights of the series was a selection of Battisti's songs performed in duet with the composer. The shows also included "Balada para mi muerte" ("Ode to My Death"), a nuevo tango duet with Astor Piazzolla at the bandoneón, backed by the Argentinian group Conjunto 9. "Grande grande grande", arranged by Pino Presti, was the second biggest-selling single of the year in Italy. The successes pushed Enrico Riccardi to take inspiration from Battisti's style in Riccardi's composition "Fiume azzurro", which earned another place in the top 100 of annual record sales in Italy.

The final number of the eight Teatro 10 episodes was "Parole parole" ("Words Words"), a duet with Alberto Lupo. The song is an easy listening dialogue between Mina's singing and Lupo's declamation. The lyrics' theme is hollow words. These intertwine the lady's lamentation of the end of love and the lies she has to hear with the male protagonist's recitation. In the dialogue she scoffs at the compliments he gives her, calling them parole – just words. The single was released in April 1972 and topped the Italian charts. It was covered by numerous Italian and French duets.

Mina said she would be retiring from public appearances after an exclusive concert at the La Bussola Club on 16 September. Thousands of people turned up at the nightclub's doorstep. Gianni Ferrio's Orchestra featured Gianni Basso on tenor saxophone and Oscar Valdambrini on trumpet.

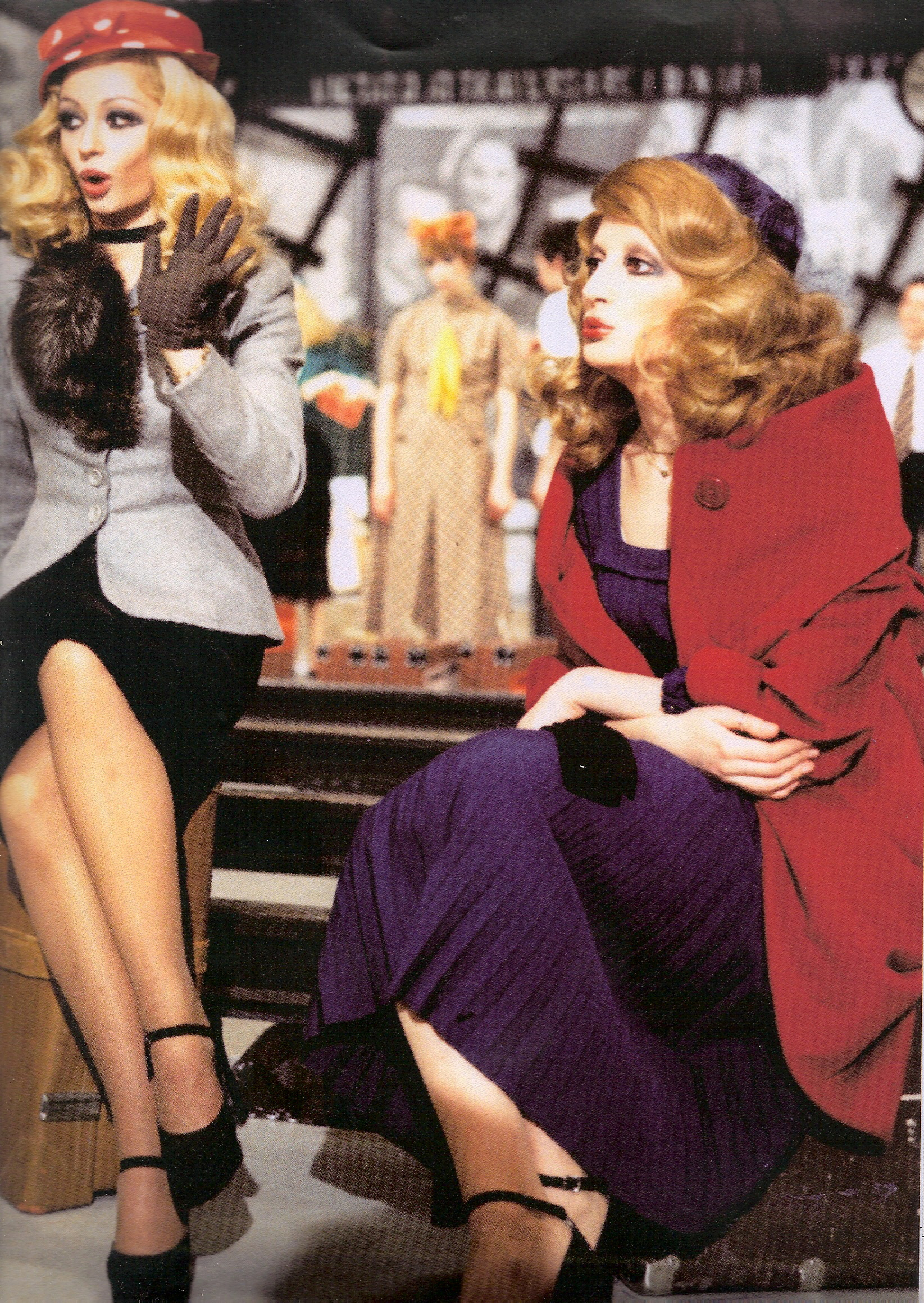
Mina with Raffaella Carrà on Milleluci, 1974

Mina lost her husband, Virgilio Crocco, in a car accident in 1973. She continued her career with the top Italian chart hits "E poi..." ("And Then...") and "L'importante è finire" ("It's Important to Finish"). She recorded the theme song "Fa presto, fa piano" ("Works Quickly, Works Quietly") for the film La sculacciata, issued in 1974.

=== Since 1974 ===
Mina's last live TV appearance was the final episode of the Milleluci series on 16 March 1974. Mina was the hostess of the series alongside Raffaella Carrà. During the series, she explored different musical styles in the songs "Everything's Alright", "Mack the Knife", "Night and Day", and "Someday (You'll Want Me to Want You)". After "Non gioco più" ("The Game Is Over"), a blues duet with the harmonica player Toots Thielemans, Mina announced her withdrawal from public performances.

Her last appearance on TV was her performance of "Ancora ancora ancora". The video was the final number of the "Mille e una luce" show on 1 July 1978. Her last concert appearances, a series of thirteen fully booked concerts at La Bussola in 1978, were cut short due to her illness. Mina gave her last public performance on 23 August 1978 at the Bussoladomani theatre. It was recorded and issued as Mina Live '78.

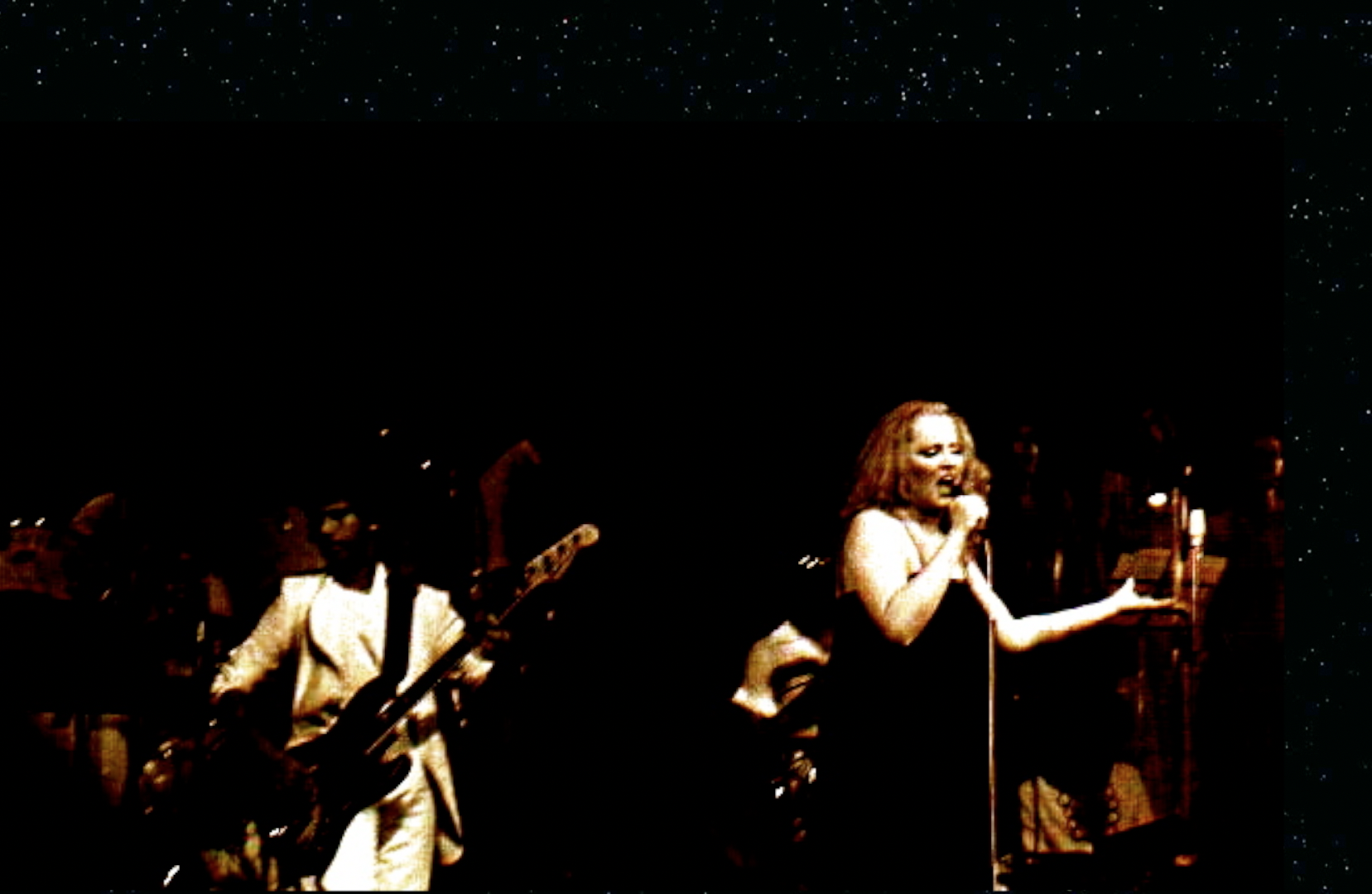
Mina backed by the orchestra conducted by bassist/arranger Pino Presti on the occasion of her last public performances at the Bussoladomani Theatre in 1978

Mina continued to release albums on a yearly basis with her son Massimiliano Pani as the producer. Between 1972 and 1995, she published a double album each year. Since 1973, her LPs and CDs have been characterized by artistic motifs of the designers Luciano Tallarini, Gianni Ronco and the photographer Mauro Balletti. From the mid-1980s, the design of the album covers was entrusted to Balletti alone. All of Mina's records under the PDU label have reached the Italian Top 100. A large part of her work has consisted of covering well-known songs; she has dedicated tribute albums to The Beatles, Frank Sinatra, Renato Zero, Domenico Modugno, Lucio Battisti, Enzo Jannacci, the Neapolitan song, and sacred music. Starting in 1989, all of her records included the jazzy piano playing of Danilo Rea.

After leaving the stage, her greatest chart successes have been duets. In 1985, "Questione di feeling", a duet with Riccardo Cocciante, was the 13th biggest-selling single of the year in Italy and became an evergreen (as a hit song is called in Europe). The duet album Mina Celentano, recorded with Celentano, was the biggest-selling album of 1998 in Italy. The break in Mina's TV appearances lasted until 2001, when she released footage of her recording sessions. The videos were broadcast over the Wind internet site on 30 March. This resulted in millions of visits to the site on that night and additional millions on the following days. The footage was released as the DVD Mina in Studio.

After that event, Mina's singles started to chart in Italy again. The track "Succhiando l'uva" (2002), written for her by Zucchero, peaked at No. 3 on the chart. Mina's cover of "Don't call me baby (Can't take my eyes off you)" (2003) reached No. 4 in Italy. The single "Alibi" (2007) reached No. 6 in Italy. The triple CD The Platinum Collection reached No. 1 on the Italian charts. So did Olio (1999), Veleno (2002), Bula Bula (2005), Todavía (2007), Le migliori (2016) and Maeba (2018). Mina's later releases included duets with Mick Hucknall, Fabrizio De André, Piero Pelù, Celentano, Lucio Dalla, Joan Manuel Serrat, Chico Buarque, Miguel Bosé, Tiziano Ferro, Giorgia and Seal. In recent years, Mina has been writing a weekly column on the front page of La Stampa (from 2000 until 2011) and a page in the Italian edition of the magazine Vanity Fair, where she answered fan letters (from 2003 until 2015).

Mina continues to publish gold selling albums. She alternates pop albums with jazz-arranged projects and other styles and keeps surprising with new musical collaborations. Meanwhile, her voice and songs are omnipresent in radio and TV commercials, theme tunes of sports programs, talent shows (where they sing classics), tribute shows, new covers, and even as samples in the recordings of other artists (for example, rapper Mondo Marcio). Although not appearing live, she opened and closed the 2009 national Sanremo Music Festival with her version of the Puccini opera aria "Nessun dorma". Her voice was also present, singing a cover in videos by main sponsor TIM, at the Festival editions of 2017 and 2018. The latter year, on the final night, a digitized version of Mina was shown performing Another Day of Sun, a cover of the song from the La La Land musical soundtrack, as a three-dimensional hologram of spaceship commander Mina, being projected onto the Ariston festival stage.

In 2016, there was quite a hype about a second album of Mina and Celentano together: Le Migliori. It became the best-selling album of the year in Italy. In 2018, Mina's new album MAEBA in 2018 debuted again at the Number 1 spot of the Italian albums and vinyls hit parade.

In 2023, a duet of Blanco and Mina, "Un briciolo di allegria", was number 1 in the Italian hit parade for 5 consecutive weeks.

On 20 April 2024, the triple live album Mina Live at the Bussola 1968-1978 was packaged and released by Warner Music Italy, consisting of a limited and numbered edition box containing the 4 LPs recorded live by Mina, the only live performances of her career, realized at the Bussola in Marina di Pietrasanta in the years 1968 (Mina alla Bussola dal vivo) 1972 (Dalla Bussola) and 1978 (Mina Live '78).

== Musical style and public image ==
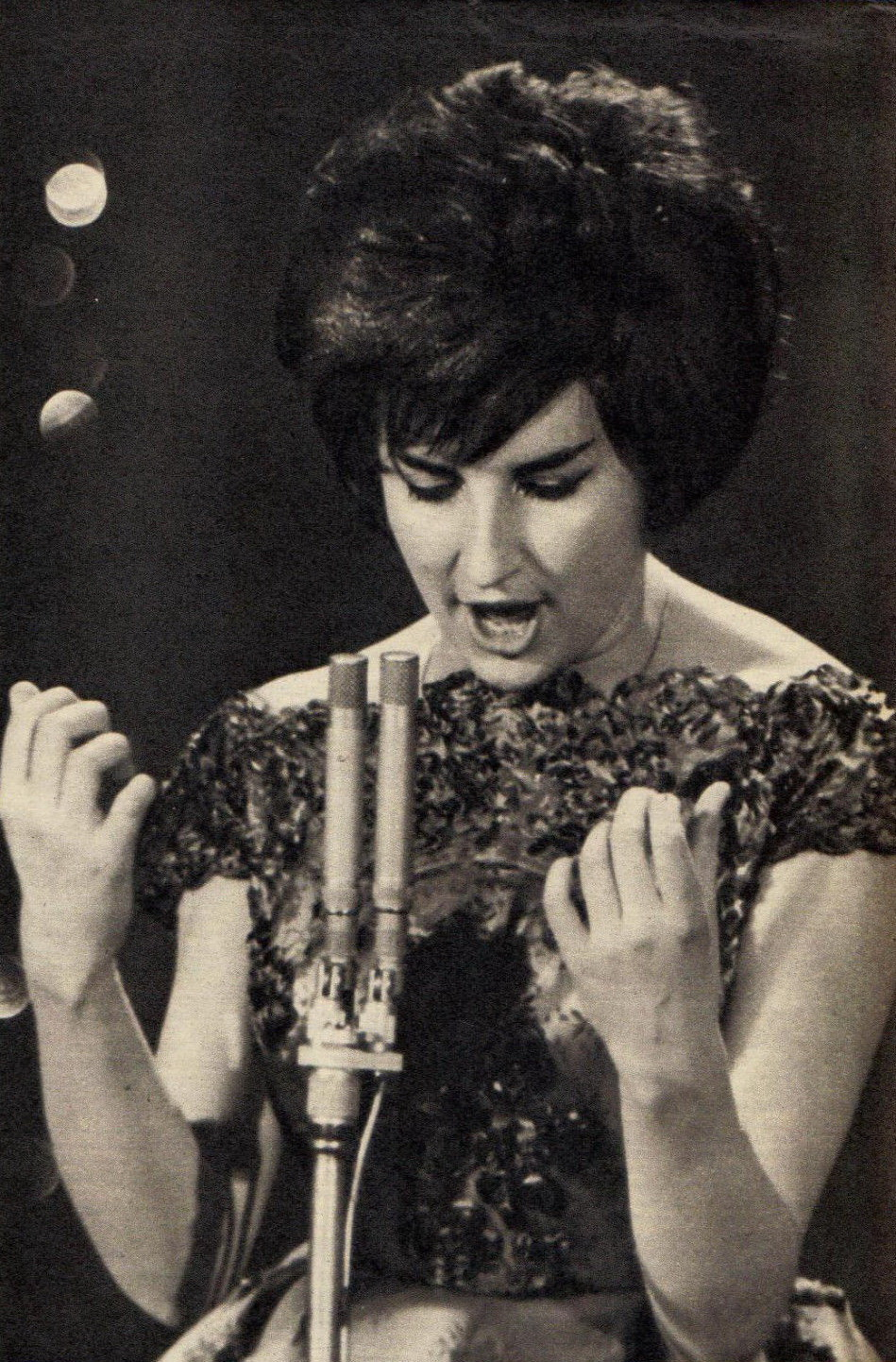
Mina at the Sanremo Music Festival 1960

=== Voice ===
Mina is a soprano with great agility and a range of three octaves. Swingy and anti-melodic in her early years ("Tintarella di luna", 1959), her singing later acquired high dramatic tones. Louis Armstrong famously declared her to be "the greatest white singer in the world".

=== Queen of Screamers ===
Caught up in the wave of rock and roll sweeping across Italy in 1958, Mina listened to American records, and she was a frequent visitor at the Derby Club, the Santa Tecla, and the Taverna Messicana clubs of Milan, which promoted rock and roll music. Mina's repertoire at the beginning of her career included clumsy imitations of British and American rock and jazz songs, while her extra-loud and syncopated version of the song "Nessuno" showcased her excellent sense of rhythm. Earlier in 1958, Domenico Modugno had caused astonishment by raising his hands in the air during his performance of "Nel blu dipinto di blu" ("Volare"). In Mina's first TV appearances, she further broke with tradition by shaking her head, hands, and hips to the rhythm. The writer Edoardo Sanguineti recalled the Italian public's first encounter with the enthusiastic singer as "for many people a memorable experience, ... a revelation." TV host Mario Riva named her one of the urlatori ("screamers"), for her distinctive timbre and power. Later, the public called Mina "the Queen of Screamers". Her extravagant gestures earned her another nickname – "the Tigress of Cremona" (la Tigre di Cremona).

=== Grown up ===
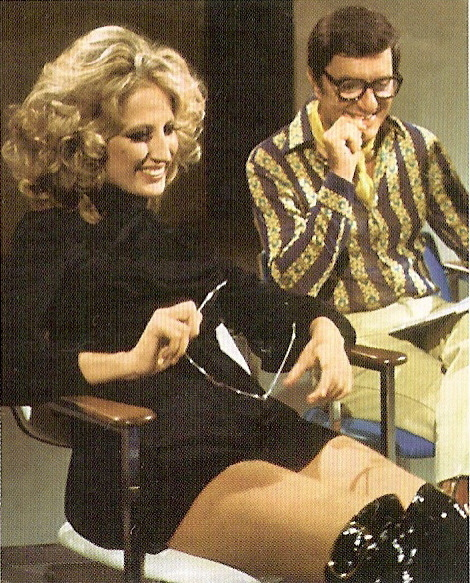
Mina with Lelio Luttazzi in 1969

Mina introduced her new sensual manner in her presentation of the ballad "Il cielo in una stanza" in 1960. Three years later, her love affair with Corrado Pani challenged the moral foundations of Italy, a country where divorce was illegal and single motherhood was considered shameful. Thus, her non-conformist choices represented the emancipation of women in Italy, which did not accord with the dominant Catholic and bourgeois virtues prevalent at the time. The subsequent ban from performing on Italian TV and radio channels further developed Mina's image as an independent bad girl, which she emphasized with her choice of song themes. An example was her performance of "Sacumdì Sacumdà" on air after RAI had expressed their displeasure with the song's lyrics about a girl's encounter with the Devil. Other songs that RAI initially banned as immoral were "Ta-ra-ta-ta" (dealing forthrightly with smoking), "La canzone di Marinella", and "L'importante è finire" (alluding to sex without love). Mina's cool act featured sex appeal, public smoking, dyed blonde hair, shaved eyebrows, and heavy use of eye make-up.

The main themes of Mina's songs were distressing love stories. Her style was to interpret them in a highly dramatic way by using gestures and body language to bring the story alive. Mina's performance was typically characterised by expressive intensity, subtle variations, and original phrasing. The music critic Gherardo Gentili has noted her interpretive skills as such: "By Mina, a word became the word, a note became the note."

To demonstrate Mina's vocal range, the composer Bruno Canfora penned the song "Brava", and Ennio Morricone wrote "Se telefonando" with numerous transitions of tonality. More songs were composed exclusively for Mina and arranged for RAI's all-star orchestras for performance on the TV variety series Studio Uno, Sabato sera, Canzonissima and Teatro 10. Mina (alongside Carmen Villani) pioneered by combining classic Italian pop and swing music with features of blues, R&B and soul music, particularly in the songs "Se stasera sono qui" and "Deborah". She helped to incorporate new styles into Italian pop music, including nuevo tango, as seen in her duet "Balada para mi muerte" with Astor Piazzolla.

=== Mogol–Battisti ===
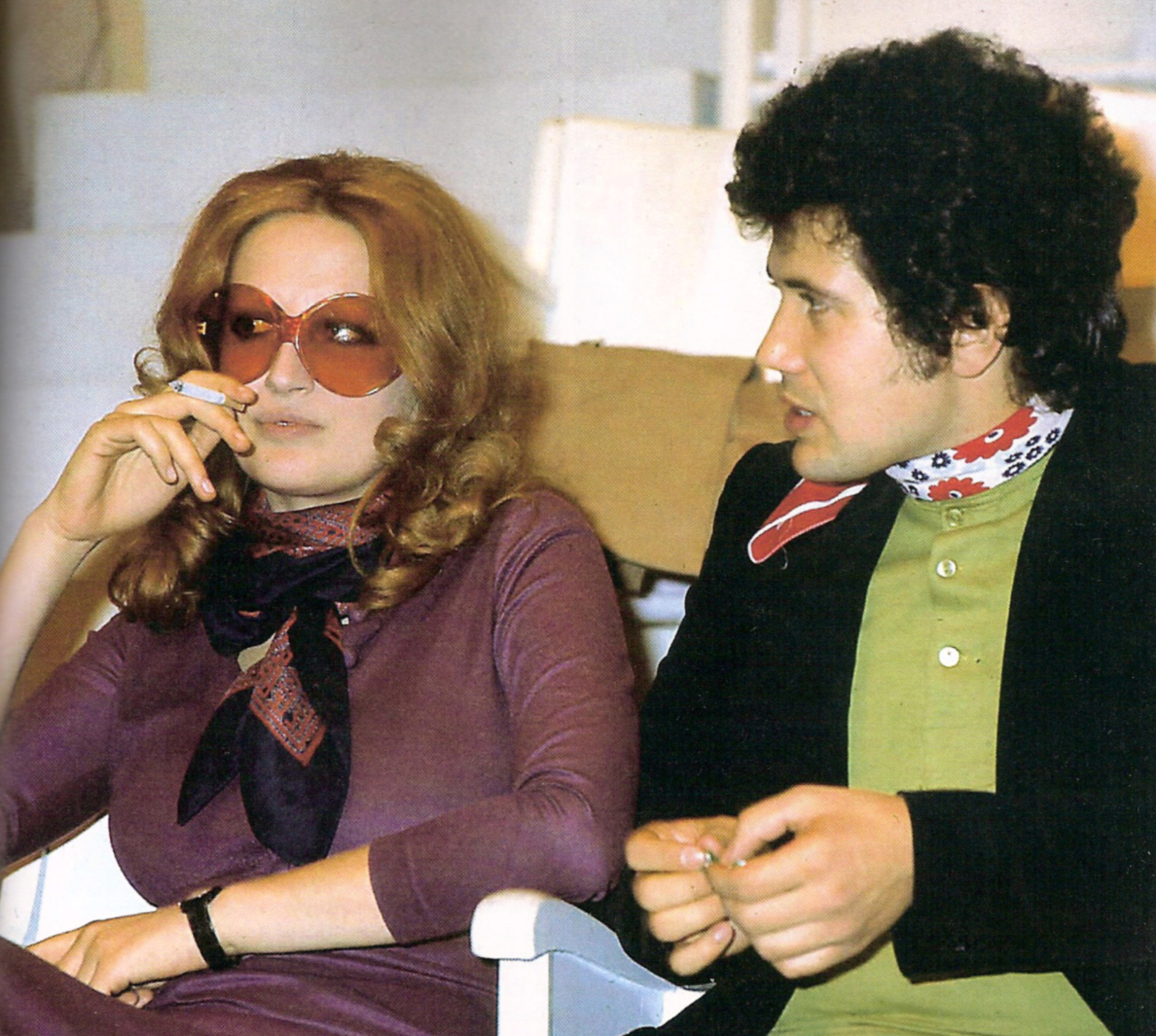
Mina and Lucio Battisti, 1972

When she altered her musical style in 1969, Mina changed her hairdo from short and straight to long blonde curls, and started to wear a black minidress. Mogol's and Lucio Battisti's first songs, particularly "Insieme" and "Io e te da soli", showcased Mina's blues and soul skills. Around the time of their collaboration, Mina turned toward middle-of-the-road pop. Battisti's melodies were sophisticated and had a complex chord sequence. The songs were characterized by frequent changes of rhythm, pauses, and dialogues between the voice and the orchestra. Another characterizing feature was an instrumental introduction without a rhythmic base.

=== Mina Latina ===
A fan of bossa nova, Mina recorded in Spanish and Portuguese from the start of her career and enjoys a fan base in Spain and Latin America. The Spanish director Pedro Almodóvar has used Mina's songs in his movie soundtracks. In 2001, Mina published the compilation album Colección Latina. It includes standards in Spanish, as well as Spanish covers of her originals. In 2003, the musical Mina... che cosa sei? based on Mina's songs was staged in Argentina, starring Elena Roger. It was nominated for four Premios ACE in 2003 and 2004, among them Best Musical, and won the Premio Clarín for Best Musical. In 2007, Mina published Todavía, an album in Spanish and Portuguese, which reached No. 36 on the Spanish charts and No. 1 on the Italian charts. It included duets with Joan Manuel Serrat, Miguel Bosé, Diego Torres, Chico Buarque, and Diego El Cigala.

== Collaborations ==
=== Collaborations with arrangers ===
  - Tony De Vita – "Tintarella di luna"
  - "Piano"
  - "Il cielo in una stanza"
- Ennio Morricone – "Se telefonando"
  - Bruno Canfora – "Vorrei che fosse amore"
  - "Brava"
  - "Sono come tu mi vuoi"
  - Augusto Martelli – "E se domani"
  - "Un anno d'amore"
  - "Non credere"
  - several albums
- Detto Mariano – "Insieme"
  - Gian Piero Reverberi – "Amor mio"
  - "Io e te da soli"
  - Gianni Ferrio – "Parole parole"
  - "Non gioco più"
  - several albums
  - Pino Presti – "Grande grande grande"
  - "E poi"
  - "L'importante è finire"
  - "Fiume azzurro"
  - "E penso a te"
  - several albums
- Alberto Nicorelli – "Ancora ancora ancora"
- Paul Buckmaster – "Questione di feeling"
  - Massimiliano Pani – "Acqua e sale"
  - "Brivido felino"

=== Collaborations with other performers ===
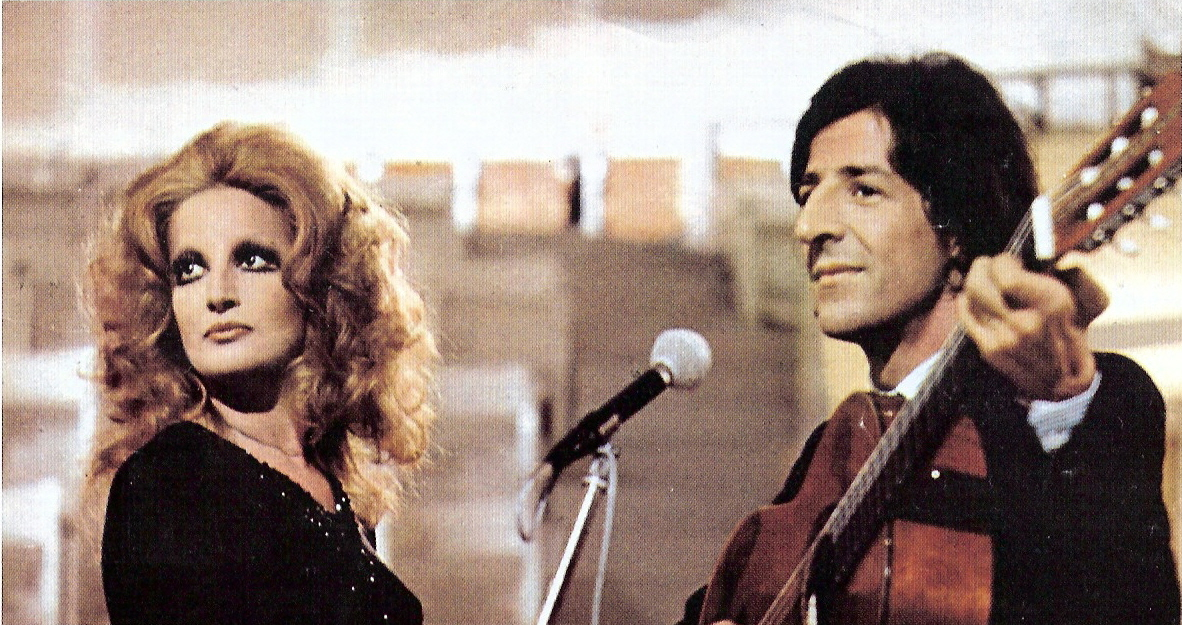
Mina duetting with Giorgio Gaber in 1972

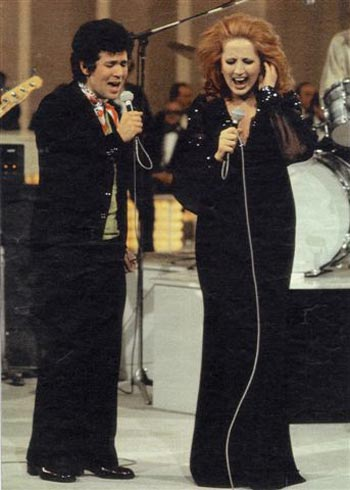
Mina duetting with Lucio Battisti in 1972

- With Adriano Celentano:
  - "Acqua e sale"
  - "Amami amami"
  - "A un passo da te"
  - "Brivido felino"
  - "Che t'aggia di'"
  - "Come un diamante nascosto nella neve"
  - "Dolce fuoco dell'amore"
  - "E l'amore"
  - "Io non volevo"
  - "Ma che ci faccio ancora qui"
  - "Messaggio d'amore"
  - "Non mi ami"
  - "Prisencolinensinainciusol"
  - "Se mi ami davvero"
  - "Sempre sempre sempre"
  - "Sono le tre"
  - "Specchi riflessi"
  - "Ti lascio amore"
- With Alberto Lupo: "Parole parole"
- With Alberto Sordi: "Fumo di Londra"
- With Andrea Mingardi:
  - "Datemi della musica"
  - "Mogol Battisti"
- With Ángel "Pato" García: "Contigo en la distancia"
- With Astor Piazzolla: "Balada para mi muerte"
- With Audio 2:
  - "Dentro ad ogni cosa"
  - "Rotola la vita"
- With Benedetta Mazzini: "More than Words"
- With Beppe Grillo: "Dottore"
- With Enzo Jannacci: "È l'era tardi"
- With Fabrizio De André: "La canzone di Marinella"
- With Fausto Leali:
  - "Via di qua"
  - "A chi mi dice"
- With Fred Bongusto:
  - "Non ci lasceremo mai"
  - "Frida"
  - "Sei proprio tu"
  - "Doce doce"
  - "A Detroit" (medley)
- With Gianni Morandi:
  - "Reggio Emilia"
  - "Meglio sarebbe"
  - "L'uva fogarina (Teresina imbriaguna)"
  - "Come porti i capelli bella bionda" (medley)
- With Giorgio Gaber:
  - "Porta Romana"
  - "La ballata del Cerutti"
  - "Trani a gogò"
  - "Barbera e champagne"
  - "Il Riccardo" (medley)
- With Johnny Dorelli and Renato Carosone:
  - "Scapricciatiello"
  - "Pigliate 'na pasticca"
  - "Pasqualino marajà"
  - "'Na voce e 'na chitarra" (medley)
- With Lelio Luttazzi: "Chi mai sei tu"
- With Lucio Battisti:
  - "Insieme"
  - "Mi ritorni in mente"
  - "Il tempo di morire"
  - "E penso a te"
  - "Io e te da soli"
  - "Eppur mi son scordato di te"
  - "Emozioni" (medley)
- With Lucio Dalla: "Amore disperato"
- With Massimiliano Pani:
  - "Come stai"
  - "If I Fell"
- With Massimo Lopez: "Noi"
- With Mick Hucknall: "Someday in My Life"
- With Miguel Bosé: "Agua y sal"
- With Milva:
  - "Motherless Child"
  - "Non arrenderti uomo"
- With Mónica Naranjo: "Él se encuentra entre tú y yo"
- With Piero Pelù: "Stay with Me"
- With Renato Zero:
  - "Neri"
  - "Tutti gli zeri del mondo"
- With Riccardo Cocciante:
  - "Amore" (from Un uomo felice)
  - "Bella senz'anima"
  - "Questione di feeling"
- With Seal: "You Get Me"
- With Toots Thielemans: "Non gioco più"
- With Voci Atroci: "Suona ancora"

=== Legacy ===
Mina has scored 77 albums and 71 singles on the Italian charts. She is the only artist to land an album at the top of the Italian charts in each of the six decades from the start of record keeping in 1965. She released an album every year from 1958 to 2003, and continues to release new albums and singles.

President Carlo Azeglio Ciampi presented her with the Second Class of the Italian Order of Merit on 1 June 2001.

British singer Dusty Springfield referenced Mina in performance.

A number of Mina's songs were turned into hits by singers in other languages:

- The first of these was "Piano", scored by Matt Monro as "Softly, as I Leave You", which reached No. 10 in the UK Top 40. In 1964, the song reached No. 27 on the Billboard Hot 100 in the version by Frank Sinatra.
- "Se telefonando" was covered by several performers in Italy and abroad, most notably by Françoise Hardy and Iva Zanicchi (1966), Delta V (2005), Vanessa and the O's (2007), and Neil Hannon (2008).
- "Grande grande grande", recorded by Shirley Bassey as "Never Never Never" in 1973, reached the Billboard Hot 100, UK Top 10, No. 1 of the Australian charts, No. 2 in South Africa and No. 3 in Singapore.
  Celine Dion with Luciano Pavarotti also recorded a version of the song in 1997 (Released as "I Hate You Then I Love You").
- A year later, Dalida and Alain Delon recorded "Paroles, paroles", the French version of "Parole parole" and made it an international hit. It became one of the most recognizable French songs in the world.
- Mexican icon José José recorded the Spanish version of the hit "Sono, come tu mi vuoi", entitled "Soy como quieras tú".
- English musician Elvis Costello used a sample from Mina's "Un bacio è troppo poco" on his album When I Was Cruel.
- Tanita Tikaram covered Mina's "And I Think of You - E penso a te" in English as a track on the album The Best of Tanita Tikaram.
- Turkish singer Ajda Pekkan has covered more than a dozen of Mina's songs.
- In 2010, the Chicago band La Scala released a rock cover of her hit "Tu Farai" with Gretta Rochelle on vocals.
- Spanish artist Mónica Naranjo recorded the album Minage with Mina's covers in Spanish, published on 20 March 1999. The tracks included "Ancora, ancora, ancora", "Io é te da soli", "Fiume azzurro" (as "Sobreviviré") and "L'immensità". Mina collaborated on the album, recording the duet "Él se encuentra entre tú y yo" ("He is between you and me").
- Irish dance music artist Róisín Murphy covered Mina's ″Non credere″ and ′Ancora, ancora, ancora″ (remixed into extended tracks by UK and Italian DJs) in her 2014 EP "Mi Senti", a reinterpretation of pop classic hits by various Italian music artists.

To celebrate Mina's 70th anniversary, the la Repubblica newspaper held a reader's poll to pick Mina's best song of all time. In a vote of 30,000 participants, "Se telefonando" emerged at the top of the list.

== Awards, nominations, honours and records ==
1958

- Nomination and performance at Sei giorni della canzone with "Proteggimi"
  - Second place

1959

- Nomination and performance at Canzonissima with "Nessuno" and "Tua"
- Juke Box d'oro Award
- Microfono d'oro Award

1960

- Nomination and performance at the Sanremo Music Festival with "Non sei felice" and "E' vero"
  - Seventh place
- Nomination and performance at Canzonissima with "Tintarella di luna", "Il cielo in una stanza", "Folle banderuola", "E' vero", "Na sera 'e maggio", "O Sarracino", "Ma l'amore no", "Violino tzigan" e "Due note"
  - Finalist with "Tintarella di luna"
  - Finalist with "Na sera 'e maggio"

1961

- Nomination and performance at the Sanremo Music Festival with:
  - "Io amo tu ami" (Fourth place)
  - "Le mille bolle blu" (Fifth place)

1963

- Nomination and performance at Canzonissima with "Il cielo in una stanza" and "Stringimi forte i polsi"
  - Finalist with "Il cielo in una stanza"

1964

- Best international artist Award, in Japan
- Best Album of the Year Critics Award for the album "Mina"
- Oscar del disco '64 Critics Award for the album "Mina"

1965

- Nomination and performance at the Mostra Internazionale di Musica Leggera with "L'ultima occasione"

1966

- Nomination and performance at the Mostra Internazionale di Musica Leggera with "Ta-ra-ta-ta"
- Gondola d'oro Award at the Mostra Internazionale di Musica Leggera

1968

- Nomination and performance at the Mostra Internazionale di Musica Leggera with "Ta-ra-ta-ta"

1987

- Targa Tenco in the category Performer of the Year with the album "Rane supreme"

2001

– Grand Officer Order of Merit of the Italian Republic: Awarded the second highest civil honour in Italy, by President Carlo Azeglio Ciampi on 1 June 2001.

2015

- Ambrogino d'oro medal by the city of Milan

=== Records ===
- The web event, live on the portal Wind, which portrays some video clips of the artist in the recording studio, has recorded over 20 million hits and was one of the most followed of all times in Italy.
- She is the most charted artist in the Italian charts, and between albums and singles, she has scored 24 number one, 61 top-three, 86 top-five, 114 top-ten and 130 top-twenty, for a total of 79 albums and 71 singles in the chart.

==== Albums: records in Italy ====
Weekly chart						Year-end chart						General chart					
No. 1	Top 3	Top 5	Top 10	Top 20	Top 30	No. 1	Top 3	Top 5	Top 10	Top 20	Top 100	No. 1	Top 3	Top 5	Top 10	Top 20	Top 100
15	34	52	62	64	67	4	7	10	20	36	72	16	37	56	70	74	79

==== Singles: records in Italy ====
Weekly chart						Year-end chart						General chart					
No. 1	Top 3	Top 5	Top 10	Top 20	Top 30	No. 1	Top 3	Top 5	Top 10	Top 20	Top 30	No. 1	Top 3	Top 5	Top 10	Top 20	Top 40
8	24	30	44	56	59	1	7	8	10	16	25	8	24	30	44	56	62

== Personal life ==
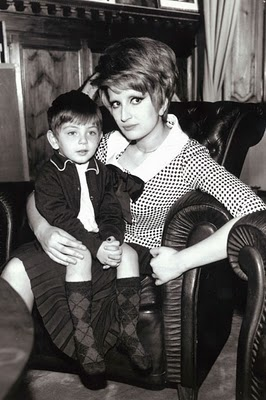
Mina with her son Massimiliano Pani in 1966

In her early teens, Mina was a competitive swimmer for the Canottieri Baldesio sports club in Cremona, attended by the elite of the Cremonese bourgeoisie at the time. At 16 she met her first boyfriend, a fullback for the U.S. Cremonese football club, at the swimming pool.

Mina fell in love with actor Corrado Pani in 1962. Their relationship shocked Italian audiences as he was already married, although separated from his wife. Their son Massimiliano was born on 18 April 1963. Owing to Mina's refusal to hide the relationship, the singer was banned from performing on public Italian television or radio channels. As her record sales were unaffected and audiences demanded to see Mina on the air, RAI was forced to end the ban and let Mina return to television on 10 January 1964. Within a year, her affair with Pani ended.

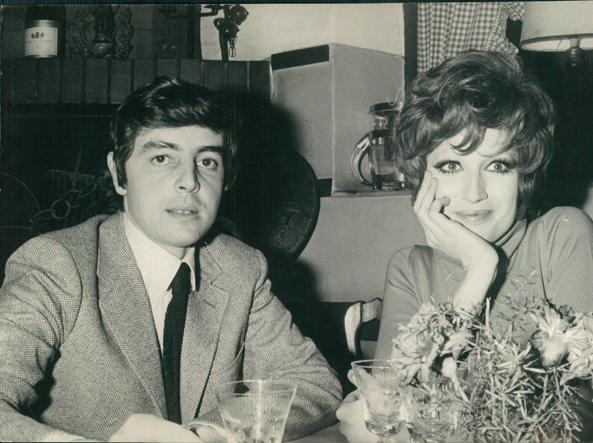
Mina and Virgilio Crocco

Mina's brother Alfredo Mazzini, also a singer under the stage name Geronimo, died in a car accident in 1965. A year later she and her father moved to Lugano, Switzerland. Mina's intimate relationships, however, remained in Italy, as she had a brief affair with the actor Walter Chiari. A later relationship with actor Gian Maria Volonté ended after she found out about Volonté's affair with an actress. Mina's great love of the late 1960s, with whom she had a relationship that lasted three years and almost led to marriage, was the composer Augusto Martelli. Her second spouse was Virgilio Crocco, a journalist for Il Messaggero, in 1970. As a result of their marriage, her legal name was changed to Mina Anna Mazzini Crocco. Their daughter Benedetta Mazzini was born on 11 November 1971. Crocco died in a car accident in 1973.

Mina became engaged to her last husband, cardiologist Eugenio Quaini, in 1981. They were married on 10 January 2006 in Lugano. She obtained Swiss citizenship in 1989. As required in that country, she took on her husband's last name and her legal name became Mina Anna Quaini. For the public, the Italian civil registry and its Italian documents, however, she still addresses herself as Mina Mazzini, also seen in her website's domain name.

== Discography ==
Studio albums

- Tintarella di luna (1960)
- Il cielo in una stanza (1960)
- Due note (1961)
- Moliendo café (1962)
- Renato (1962)
- Stessa spiaggia, stesso mare (1963)
- Mina (1964)
- Studio Uno (1965)
- Studio Uno 66 (1966)
- Mina 2 (1966)
- Sabato sera - Studio Uno '67 (1967)
- Dedicato a mio padre (1967)
- Le più belle canzoni italiane interpretate da Mina (1968)
- Canzonissima '68 (1968)
- I discorsi (1969)
- Mina for You (1969)
- ...bugiardo più che mai... più incosciente che mai... (1969)
- Mina canta o Brasil (1970)
- ...quando tu mi spiavi in cima a un batticuore... (1970)
- Mina (1971)
- Cinquemilaquarantatre (1972)
- Altro (1972)
- Frutta e verdura (1973)
- Amanti di valore (1973)
- Mina^{®} (1974)
- Baby Gate (1974)
- La Mina (1975)
- Minacantalucio (1975)
- Singolare (1976)
- Plurale (1976)
- Mina quasi Jannacci (1977)
- Mina con bignè (1977)
- Attila (1979)
- Kyrie (1980)
- Salomè (1981)
- Italiana (1982)
- Mina 25 (1983)
- Catene (1984)
- Finalmente ho conosciuto il conte Dracula... (1985)
- Sì, buana (1986)
- Rane supreme (1987)
- Ridi pagliaccio (1988)
- Uiallalla (1989)
- Ti conosco mascherina (1990)
- Caterpillar (1991)
- Sorelle Lumière (1992)
- Mina canta i Beatles (1993)
- Lochness (1993)
- Canarino mannaro (1994)
- Pappa di latte (1995)
- Cremona (1996)
- Napoli (1996)
- Leggera (1997)
- Mina Celentano (1998)
- Olio (1999)
- Mina n° 0 (1999)
- Dalla terra (2000)
- Sconcerto (2001)
- Veleno (2002)
- Napoli secondo estratto (2003)
- Bula Bula (2005)
- L'allieva (2005)
- Bau (2006)
- Todavía (2007)
- Sulla tua bocca lo dirò (2009)
- Facile (2009)
- Caramella (2010)
- Piccolino (2011)
- 12 (American Song Book) (2012)
- Christmas Song Book (2013)
- Selfie (2014)
- Le Migliori (2016)
- Maeba (2018)
- Mina Fossati (2019)
- Ti amo come un pazzo (2023)
- Gassa d'amante (2024)

== Filmography ==
=== Films ===
Film roles showing year released, title, role played, director and notes
Title	Year	Role	Director	Notes
Juke Box: Urli d'amore	1959	Singer	Mauro Morassi	Cameo appearance
I Teddy Boys della canzone	1960	Minuccia	Domenico Paolella	
Sanremo - La grande sfida	1960	Herself	Piero Vivarelli	Cameo appearance
Appuntamento a Ischia	1960	Herself	Mario Mattoli	Mid-credit cameo
Madri pericolose	1960	Nicky Improta	Domenico Paolella	
Howlers in the Dock	1960	Mina	Lucio Fulci	
Mina… fuori la guardia!	1961	Valeria	Armando Tamburella	
Io bacio… tu baci	1961	Marcella	Piero Vivarelli	
Appuntamento in Riviera	1962	Mina	Mario Mattoli	
Des haben die Mädchen gern	1962	Herself	Kurt Nachmann	Cameo appearance
Canzoni nel mondo	1963	Herself	Vittorio Sala	Documentary film
Per amore... per magia...	1967	Aichesiade	Duccio Tessari	

=== Television ===
Television roles showing year released, title, role played, network and notes
Title	Year	Role	Network	Notes
Studio Uno	1961–1966	Herself / Presenter	Rai 1	Variety show (seasons 1, 3–4)
Sabato sera	1967	Herself / Presenter	Rai 1	Variety show
TuttoTotò	1967	Night club singer	Rai 1	Episode: "Totò ye ye"
Canzonissima	1968–1969	Herself / Presenter	Rai 1	Musical/variety program (season 6)
Senza Rete	1968–1970	Herself / co-host	Rai 1	Variety show (seasons 1–3)
Non cantare, spara	1968	Wilhelmina	Rai 1	Episode: "Seconda puntata"
Noches de Europa	1969	Herself / Musical guest	La 2	Episode dated Nov. 8, 1969
Teatro 10	1972	Herself / Performer	Rai 1	Variety show (season 3)
Milleluci	1974	Herself / co-host	Rai 1	Variety show

== Bibliography ==
- Mina, come sono by Gianni Pettenati (Virgilio 1980)
- Mina, la voce by Mario Guarino (Forte 1983)
- Unicamente Mina by Flavio Merkel and Paolo Belluso (Gammalibri 1983)
- La leggendaria Mina (PDU Italiana Edizioni Musicali S.r.l./Curci 1983)
- Mina. Storia di un mito raccontato by Nino Romano (Rusconi 1986)
- Mina nelle fotografie di Mauro Balletti (Campanotto 1990)
- Mina – Le immagini e la storia di un mito (Eden 1992)
- Mina – Mito e mistero by Nino Romano (Sperling & Kupfer 1996)
- Mina – I miti by Antonella Giola, Daniela Teruzzi & Gherardo Gentili (Arnoldo Mondadori 1997)
- Mina – I mille volti di una voce by Romy Padovano (Arnoldo Mondadori 1998)
- Divina Mina by Dora Giannetti (Zelig 1998)
- Mina by Roberta Maresci (Gremese 1998)
- Mina – Una forza incantatrice by Franco Fabbri & Luigi Pestalozza (eds. Euresis 1998)
- Mina – La sua vita, i suoi successi by Gianni Lucini (Sonzogno 1999)
- Mina, il mito (Tempo Libro 1999)
- Studio Mina by Flaviano De Luca (ed. Elle U Multimedia 1999)
- Mina disegnata fotografata – Authors' copyright 2001
- Mina: Gli anni Italdisc 1959–1964 by Marco Castiglioni, Fulvio Fiore, Maurizio Maiotti, Stefania Fiore, Barbara Alari and Maurizio Maiotti (Satisfaction 2001)
- Mina 1958–2005 Ancora insieme by Marcello Bufacchi (Riuniti 2005)
- Mina talk. Vent'anni di interviste. 1959–1979 by Fernando Fratarcangeli (Coniglio 2005)
- Mina... il fascino della tigre by Ghea Irene (Lo Vecchio 2006)
- La Storia della Disco Music by Andrea Angeli Bufalini / Giovanni Savastano (Hoepli 2019)
- Mina, Una Voce Universale by Luca Cerchiari (Mondadori 2020)

== See also ==
- List of best-selling music artists
- List of estimated best-selling Italian music artists
