= Ri-Fi =

Italian record label

Ri-Fi was an Italian record company and label, active between 1959 and 1982.

The company was founded in Milan by Giovanni Battista Ansoldi, who also was CEO. The company discovered and launched many artists, including Iva Zanicchi, Fred Bongusto and I Giganti, as well as recording established artists such as Fausto Leali and Michele. Notably, singer Mina had several major hits with Ri-Fi between 1963 and 1967, including "Città vuota", "È l'uomo per me", "Un anno d'amore" and "E se domani". A few years after the death of Ansoldi in 1979, the company went on hiatus. Its catalogue was subsequently bought by Southern Music.
