= Del mio meglio n. 4 =

Del mio meglio numero quattro

Compilation album by Mina
- Released: 1977
- Recorded: 1967–1977
- Studios: La Basilica, Milan
- Genre: Pop
- Length: 47:05
- Label: PDU

Mina chronology
| Singolare e plurale (1976) | Del mio meglio numero quattro (1977) | Mina quasi Jannacci (1977) |

Del mio meglio numero quattro is a compilation album released by Mina in 1977. All the tracks have been previously released, with the exception of "Never, Never, Never", the English version of "Grande, grande, grande". The song "Never Never Never" was recorded by Shirley Bassey in 1973, and was an international success. It has since been recorded by, among others, Celine Dion as a duet with Luciano Pavarotti in 1997, with the title "I Hate You Then I Love You" (on the album Let's Talk About Love).

== Track listing ==
| No. | Title | Writer(s) | Length |
|---|---|---|---|
| 1. | "Uappa" (from La Mina, 1975) | Luigi Albertelli, Enrico Riccardi | 3:20 |
| 2. | "Never, Never, Never" (English version of "Grande grande grande") | Tony Renis, Alberto Testa, Norman Newell | 3:59 |
| 3. | "Ma se ghe penso" (from Dedicato a mio padre, 1967) | Attilio Margutti, Mario Cappello | 3:33 |
| 4. | "E penso a te" (from Mina; studio version, 1971) | Lucio Battisti, Mogol | 3:43 |
| 5. | "Immagina un concerto" (from La Mina, 1975) | Andrea Lo Vecchio, Shel Shapiro | 4:18 |
| 6. | "Solo lui" (from Mina®, 1974) | Fabio Massimo Cantini, Franca Evangelisti | 4:25 |
| 7. | "I giardini di marzo" (from Minacantalucio, 1975) | Lucio Battisti, Mogol | 6:07 |
| 8. | "L'importante è finire" (from La Mina, 1975) | Cristiano Malgioglio, Alberto Anelli | 3:22 |
| 9. | "Colpa mia" (from Singolare, 1976) | Roberto Soffici, Dante Pieretti, Simon Luca | 4:06 |
| 10. | "Il nostro caro angelo" (from Minacantalucio, 1975) | Lucio Battisti, Mogol | 4:09 |
| 11. | "Don't" (from Baby Gate, 1974) | Jerry Leiber, Mike Stoller | 3:01 |
| 12. | "Caravel" (from Mina®, 1974) | Guido Bolzoni | 2:58 |
| Total length: | | | 47:05 |

== Credits ==
- Mina – vocals
- Enrico Riccardi - arranger and conductor in "Uappa"
- Pino Presti – arranger and conductor in "Never, Never, Never", "E penso a te", "L'importante è finire" and "Don't"
- Augusto Martelli – arranger and conductor in "Ma se ghe penso"
- Shel Shapiro – arranger and conductor in "Immagina un concerto"
- Toto Torquati – arranger and conductor in "Solo lui"
- Gabriel Yared – arranger and conductor in "I giardini di marzo" and "Il nostro caro angelo"
- Roberto Soffici – arranger and conductor in "Colpa mia"
- Simon Luca – arranger and conductor in "Colpa mia"
- Vince Tempera – arranger and conductor in "Caravel"
- Nuccio Rinaldis – sound engineer
