= Del mio meglio n. 5 =

Studio album by Mina
- Released: May 1979
- Recorded: at PDU studios in Lugano
- Length: 41:01
- Label: PDU
- Producer: Massimiliano Pani

Mina chronology
Mina Live '78 (1978)	Del mio meglio n. 5 (1979)	Attila (1979)

Del mio meglio n. 5 is a compilation album by Italian singer Mina released in May 1979.

== Overview ==
The album contains tracks Mina recorded between 1972's "Altro" and 1977's "Mina con bignè". The version of L'abitudine (Daddy's Dream) featured here is an alternate version of the same title on Mina con bignè (1977). This is the first compilation disc to contain this alternate version.

== Track listing ==
No.	Title	Writer(s)	Length
1.	"Ma che bontà from the album Mina con bignè (1977)."	Enrico Riccardi	3:04
2.	"Ancora dolcemente from the album Singolare (1976)."	Fabio Massimo Cantini, Luigi Lopez, Paolo Cassella	5:01
3.	"C'è un uomo in mezzo al mare from the album Plurale (1976)."	Nino Giuseppe Rastelli, Dino Olivieri	2:30
4.	"Nuur from the album Mina® (1974)."	Osvaldo Miccike, Ermanno Capelli	4:31
5.	"Carlo detto il mandrillo from the album Amanti di valore (1973)."	Franco Califano, Carlo Pes	3:01
6.	"L'abitudine (Daddy's Dream) alternate version to track on Altro (1972)."	Harold Stott, H. Onward, Bruno Lauzi	3:20
7.	"Una ragazza in due (Down came the rain) from the album Mina con bignè (1977)."	Mitch Murray, Robin Conrad, Leo Chiosso	3:13
8.	"Pennsylvania 6-5000 from the album Plurale (1976)."	Carl Sigman, Jerry Gray	2:57
9.	"L'amore, forse (Ao amigo Tom) from the album Altro (1972)."	Marcos Valle Osmar Milito, Giorgio Calabrese	2:44
10.	"That's When Your Heartaches Begin from the album Baby Gate (1974)."	Fred Fisher, William J. Raskin, George Brown	3:40
11.	"Triste from the album Singolare (1976)."	Antonio Amurri, Gianni Ferrio	5:42
12.	"La mia vecchiaia from the album Amanti di valore (1973)."	Franco Califano, Carlo Pes	3:18

== Musicians ==
=== Artists ===
- Mina- voice

=== Arrangement and orchestra director ===
- Enrico Riccardi: Track 1
- Tony Mimms: Track 2
- Gianni Ferrio: Track 3, 8, 9, 11
- Pino Presti: Track 4, 7, 10
- Carlo Pes / Pino Presti: Track 5, 12
- Massimo Salerno: Track 6
- Sound engineer: Nuccio Rinaldis
