= Je suis Mina =

Compilation album by Mina
- Released: 22 March 2011
- Recorded: 1969–1981
- Studio: La Basilica, Milan
- Genre: Europop
- Length: 79:21
- Label: EMI

Mina chronology
| Piccola strenna (2010) | Je suis Mina (2011) | I Am Mina (2011) |

Je suis Mina is a compilation album by Italian singer Mina, released on 22 March 2011 by EMI.

== Overview ==
Je suis Mina is part of a multilingual triptych along with I Am Mina and Yo soy Mina, performed in English and Spanish respectively, in this case all the songs are performed in French and are being released on CD for the first time.

Mostly there are French versions of songs from the 70s, taken from the albums Frutta e verdura (1973), Mina® (1974), La Mina (1975) and Singolare (1976). There are French versions of such big hits as "Non credere" ("Ne la crois pas"), "Io e te da soli" and original song "Cigarette" by singer and songwriter Jacques Higelin. The album also includes "C'est une chanson", the last single released for the French market, the original of which, "Una canzone", was taken from the album Salomè (1981), and its B-side "Quand l'amour vous touche". The French versions of "Sognando" ("A cœur ouvert") and "Ancora dolcemente" ("Les mauvais jours") are published here for the first time.

Most of the French lyrics were written by Pierre Delanoë and Eddy Marnay.

== Track listing ==
| No. | Title | Writer(s) | Length |
|---|---|---|---|
| 1. | "Si..." ("Vorrei che fosse amore") | Antonio Amurri; Bruno Canfora; Eddy Marnay | 2:23 |
| 2. | "L'amour est mort" ("Io e te da soli") | Mogol; Lucio Battisti; Jacques Demarny | 4:29 |
| 3. | "Pour en finir comment faire" ("L'importante è finire") | Alberto Anelli; Cristiano Malgioglio; Pierre Delanoë | 3:12 |
| 4. | "Et puis ça sert à quoi" ("E poi...") | Andrea Lo Vecchio; Shel Shapiro; Delanoë | 4:23 |
| 5. | "Lumière" ("Nuur") | Ermanno Capelli; Osvaldo Miccichè; Delanoë | 4:15 |
| 6. | "C'est une chanson" ("Una canzone") | Gianni Belleno; Nico Di Palo; Ricky Belloni; Vittorio De Scalzi; Delanoë | 3:50 |
| 7. | "La chiromancienne" ("Caravel") | Guido Bolzoni; Delanoë | 2:44 |
| 8. | "Ensemble" ("Distanze") | Luigi Albertelli; Roberto Soffici; Delanoë | 4:32 |
| 9. | "Comme un homme" | Hubert Giraud; Delanoë | 3:10 |
| 10. | "Quand l'amour vous touche" ("Quando l'amore ti tocca") | Dibì; Nini Carucci; Delanoë | 3:16 |
| 11. | "Moi je te regarde" ("Io innamorata") | Augusto Martelli; Giorgio Calabrese; Marnay | 2:56 |
| 12. | "Ne la crois pas" ("Non credere") | Ascri; Mogol; Soffici; Marnay | 4:15 |
| 13. | "Le cœur en larmes" ("Un colpo al cuore") | Giancarlo Bigazzi; Mario Capuano; Marnay | 3:18 |
| 14. | "La vie" ("Credi") | Mario Nobile; Paolo Limiti; Demarny | 3:27 |
| 15. | "Les oiseaux reviennent" ("Non tornare più") | Dario Baldan Bembo; Franco Califano; Delanoë | 4:39 |
| 16. | "Cigarette" | Jacques Higelin | 3:52 |
| 17. | "Deux peut-être trois" ("Due o forse tre") | Lo Vecchio; Shapiro; Delanoë | 4:05 |
| 18. | "C'est comme un arc en ciel" ("Racconto") | Giraud; Delanoë | 3:38 |
| 19. | "Rien que vous" ("Solo lui") | Fabio Massimo Cantini; Franca Evangelisti; Delanoë | 4:19 |
| 20. | "A cœur ouvert" ("Sognando") | Don Backy; Delanoë | 3:59 |
| 21. | "Les mauvais jours" ("Ancora dolcemente") | Massimo Cantini; Luigi Lopez; Paolo Cassella; Delanoë | 4:20 |
| Total length: | | | 79:21 |

== Personnel ==
- Mina – vocals
- Gianluca Lazzarin – digital mastering
- Mauro Baletti – cover art
- Giuseppe Spada – graphic design
- Gianni Rosco – illustrations

Credits are adapted from the album's liner notes.

== Charts ==
Chart performance for Je suis Mina
| Chart (2011) | Peak position |
|---|---|
| Italian Albums (FIMI) | 48 |
