= I Am Mina =

Compilation album by Mina
- Released: 22 March 2011
- Recorded: 1969–1991
- Studio: La Basilica, Milan; Studi PDU, Lugano
- Genre: Europop
- Length: 68:59
- Label: EMI

Mina chronology
Je suis Mina (2011)	I Am Mina (2011)	Yo soy Mina (2011)

I Am Mina is a compilation album by Italian singer Mina, released on 22 March 2011 by EMI.

== Overview ==
This album is a trilogy of compilations released in 2011 and also includes albums in French (Je suis Mina) and Spanish (Yo soy Mina). Some of the songs on the compilation have never been released in albums or in Italy.

I Am Mina covers the period from the late 1960s to the early 1990s with English versions of some of his classic works, such as "Il cielo in una stanza" ("The World We Love In"), "Vorrei che fosse amore" ("More Than Strangers") and "Quand'ero piccola". There are several songs from the repertoire of the 70s, when her albums usually topped the charts: "I Still Love You" ("Fate piano"), "Where Would I Be Without Your Love?" ("Ancora dolcemente"), "Love Me" ("Uappa"), with a different arrangement than the original. The album also features English versions of Mina's bestselling singles, such as "Runaway" ("E poi..."), "Never, Never, Never" ("Grande, grande, grande") and "Take Me" ("L'importante è finire").

English versions of "Quand'ero piccola", "Io innamorata" and "I discorsi" were previously unreleased. "Walk on By", "Strangers in the Night", "Only You" and "Stardust" are already released on Mina's previous studio albums.

Most of the songs were adapted into English by Norman Newell.

== Critical reception ==
Professional ratings
Review scores
Source	Rating
AllMusic	3/5 stars

Mariano Prunes from AllMusic highly appreciated the album's design, vocals and Mina's performing abilities, but noted that the translated versions of the songs are worse than the original lyrics in almost all songs, and also stated that the American jazz and pop melodies that end the compilation are not particularly inspiring. In conclusion, he wrote that this compilation is suitable only for fans of Mina, but for those who want to understand what her genius is, it is necessary to avoid it and listen to Italian albums.

== Track listing ==
No.	Title	Writer(s)	Length
1.	"Take Me" ("L'importante è finire")	Cristiano Malgioglio; Alberto Anelli; Norman Newell	3:24
2.	"Runaway" ("E poi...")	Andrea Lo Vecchio; Shel Shapiro	4:47
3.	"More Than Strangers" ("Vorrei che fosse amore")	Antonio Amurri; Bruno Canfora; Gladys Shelley; Jimmy Nebb	2:20
4.	"Love Me" ("Uappa")	Enrico Riccardi; Luigi Albertelli; Newell	3:29
5.	"Never, Never, Never" ("Grande, grande, grande")	Alberto Testa; Tony Renis; Newell	3:58
6.	"I Still Love You" ("Fate piano")	Lo Vecchio; Shapiro	4:10
7.	"Why? (Why Do You Treat Me Like You Do)" ("Vorrei averti nonostante tutto")	Testa; Danilo Vaona; Virca; Newell	4:32
8.	"The Way I Love You" ("Amore mio")	Canfora; Gina Basso; Newell	3:42
9.	"Where Would I Be Without Your Love?" ("Ancora dolcemente")	Fabio Massimo Cantini; Luigi Lopez; Paolo Amerigo Cassella; Newell	4:24
10.	"Don't Ask Me to Love You" ("Domenica sera")	Corrado Castellari; Stefano Scandolara; Newell	3:18
11.	"The World We Love In" ("Il cielo in una stanza")	Gino Paoli; Mogol; Renato Angiolini; Don Raye	2:28
12.	"Quand'ero piccola" (English version)	Bruno Zambrini; Franco Migliacci; Luis Enriquez; Newell	2:43
13.	"Io innamorata" (English version)	Augusto Martelli; Giorgio Calabrese; Newell	2:59
14.	"I discorsi" (English version)	Martelli; Mina; Newell	3:09
15.	"Walk on By"	Burt Bacharach; Hal David	8:25
16.	"Strangers in the Night"	Bert Kaempfert; Charles Singleton; Eddie Snyder	3:40
17.	"Only You"	Ande Rand; Buck Ram	3:11
18.	"Stardust"	Hoagy Carmichael; Mitchell Parish	3:50
Total length:			68:59

== Personnel ==
- Mina – vocals
- Gianluca Lazzarin – digital mastering
- Mauro Baletti – cover art
- Giuseppe Spada – graphic design
- Gianni Rosco – illustrations

Credits are adapted from the album's liner notes.

== Charts ==
Chart performance for I Am Mina
Chart (2011)	Peak position
Italian Albums (FIMI)	57
