= International Association for Child Safety =

The International Association for Child Safety (IAFCS) is a network of child safety professionals and babyproofers. IAFCS is a non-profit trade association of child safety-related businesses whose aim is to promote and support its members' businesses and the professional childproofing industry as a whole. Member-businesses accomplish this by educating parents, evaluating homes for potential hazards, and professionally installing safety products.

== History ==
The evolution of the International Association for Child Safety began in the mid 1980s. At that time, professional babyproofing was a new entrepreneurial idea. The first companies were all individual businesses working independently of one another, experiencing the typical difficulties of starting a small, unique-concept business. The first meeting was held in Dallas on November 4, 1995, the day before the opening of the Juvenile Products Manufacturers Association (JPMA) show. About 15 different companies were represented. The name International Association for Child Safety was adopted, with the word “international” added to reflect two members from Canada in attendance. This proved insightful as it allowed for the Association to later include members from other countries such as Turkey, England, New Zealand, South Africa, Columbia and the Netherlands.

On October 15, 1997, the International Association for Child Safety was incorporated as a nonprofit organization.

== Moving Forward ==
In February 2008, the Officers and Board of Directors held a facilitated strategic planning meeting to lay out future goals for the IAFCS. Many of these goals have since been completed, some highlights of which include:

- Hiring an executive director. After over 10 years of operating solely by volunteer members, it was decided that the Association could not continue to grow without this position added. In November 2008, Colleen Driscoll, a long-time IAFCS volunteer and babyproofer, accepted this position.
- Streamlining the leadership into three officer/board members to work more efficiently with the executive director, committees and task forces. This was approved and implemented during the 2009 elections.
- Moving the annual meetings away from the juvenile industry product show. Annual meetings were held in different locations to encourage attendance and for vendors to bring their safety products to the IAFCS. Recent meetings were held in Atlanta, Georgia (2011); Ft. Lauderdale, Florida (2012); and Las Vegas, Nevada (2013).
- Creating new categories of membership including foundation, associate, and manufacturing members. All three categories have been developed with new members in each category.
- Creating a task force to develop and implement the childproofing industry's first certification program. The Certified Professional Childproofer (CPC) program was officially launched in 2010, with candidates sitting for the required exam at the 2010 IAFCS conference in Phoenix, Arizona. Additional requirements for certification include 600+ field hours of in-home child safety services, background checks, and references from current clients.

== See also ==
- Childproofing
- Baby gate
