= Nuda (Mina song) =

Single by Mina

from the album Singolare
- Language: Italian
- B-side: "Colpa mia"
- Released: May 1976
- Recorded: 13 May 1976
- Studio: La Basilica, Milan
- Genre: Pop
- Length: 4:00
- Label: PDU
- Songwriter: Don Backy

Mina singles chronology
"L'importante è finire" (1975)	"Nuda" (1976)	"Giorni" / "Ormai" (1977)

"Nuda" (English: "Naked") is a song recorded by Italian singer Mina for her 1976 album Singolare. Don Backy wrote the song, and Pino Presti did the arrangement. In May 1976, the song was released as a single and peaked at number 6, spending 17 weeks on the Italian chart.

The B-side of the single was the song "Colpa mia"(English: "My Fault"), written by Gian Pieretti, Roberto Soffici, and Simon Luca. It was used as the theme song of the radio program Gran varietà. On 18 June 1976, Mina performed the song in the musical show Dal Ticino con simpatia on the RSI TV channel, broadcast from the Lugano Congress Palace with the participation of Italian musicians living in Switzerland. It was one of her last television appearances.

== Track listing ==
7" single
A. "Nuda" – 4:00
B. "Colpa mia" (Gian Pieretti, Roberto Soffici, Simon Luca) – 4:02

== Charts ==
Chart performance for "Nuda"
Chart (1976)	Peak position
Italy (Billboard)	10
Italy (Musica e dischi)	6
