= Del mio meglio n. 3 =

Compilation album by Mina
- Released: 1975
- Recorded: 1972–1974
- Studio: La Basilica, Milan
- Genre: Pop
- Length: 44:14
- Language: Italian; English
- Label: PDU

Mina chronology
Baby Gate (1974)	Del mio meglio n. 3 (1975)	Minacantalucio (1975)

Singles from Del mio meglio n. 3
- 1. "Non gioco più" Released: September 1974

Del mio meglio n. 3 is a compilation album by Italian singer Mina, released in 1975 by PDU and distributed by EMI Italiana.

== Overview ==
This is the third compilation of the Del mio meglio series. It included songs from albums released from 1972 to 1974. Only the songs "Non gioco più" and "La scala buia" were previously released only as non-album single.

The album's design, as in previous times, is a Greek cross. The photos were taken during the creation of four color music video intended for the foreign market and shot simultaneously with recordings of the Milleluci TV show.

== Track listing ==
Side A
No.	Title	Writer(s)	Original album	Length
1.	"E poi..."	Andrea Lo Vecchio; Shel Shapiro	Frutta e verdura (1973)	3:34
2.	"La pioggia di marzo (Águas de Março)"	Antônio Carlos Jobim; Giorgio Calabrese	Frutta e verdura (1973)	3:39
3.	"Domenica sera"	Stefano Scandolara; Corrado Castellari	Frutta e verdura (1973)	2:44
4.	"Bird Dog"	Boudleaux Bryant; Felice Bryant	Baby Gate (1974)	2:27
5.	"Distanze"	Luigi Albertelli; Roberto Soffici	Mina^{®} (1974)	4:39
6.	"Amore mio"	Bruno Canfora; Gina Basso	Altro (1972)	3:39
Total length:				22:32

Side B
No.	Title	Writer(s)	Original album	Length
1.	"Non gioco più"	Roberto Lerici; Gianni Ferrio	—	2:57
2.	"Fa qualcosa"	Alberto Testa; Walter Malgoni	Frutta e verdura (1973)	4:17
3.	"Mr. Blue"	DeWayne Blackwell	Baby Gate (1974)	2:40
4.	"La scala buia"	Gianni Boncompagni; Franco Bracardi; Riccardo Pazzaglia	—	3:51
5.	"Mai prima"	Fabio Massimo Cantini; Franca Evangelisti	Mina^{®} (1974)	4:09
6.	"Amanti di valore"	Franco Califano; Carlo Pes	Amanti di valore (1973)	4:22
Total length:				21:42

== Personnel ==
- Mina – vocals
- Pino Presti – arrangement (A1–A5, B2–B4, B6)
- Bruno Canfora – arrangement (A6)
- Gianni Ferrio – arranger (B1)
- Toto Torquati – arranger (B5)
- Carlo Pes – arranger (B6)
- Nuccio Rinaldis – sound engineer
- Luciano Tallarini – cover art

Credits are adapted from the album's liner notes.

== Charts ==
Chart performance for Del mio meglio n. 3
Chart (1975)	Peak position
Italian Albums (Billboard)	4
Italian Albums (Musica e dischi)	4
