= Zum zum zum (song) =

Single by Mina

from the album Canzonissima '68
- Language: Italian
- B-side: "Sacumdì sacumdà"
- Released: October 1968
- Recorded: 10–13 October 1968
- Genre: Pop
- Length: 2:41
- Label: PDU
- Composer: Bruno Canfora
- Lyricist: Antonio Amurri

Mina singles chronology
| "Nè come nè perchè" (1968) | "Zum zum zum" (1968) | "Lunedì 26 ottobre" (1968) |

"Zum zum zum" is a song written by Bruno Canfora and Antonio Amurri as an opening theme for the 1968 television program Canzonissima, when all the participants performed it in chorus.

The song was originally recorded by Italian singer Mina, who was the host of the show. Her version was released as a single, but only reached number 20 on the Italian chart. The B-side was the song "Sacumdi sacumdà", which is the Italian version of the Portuguese song "Nem Vem Que não Tem" by Carlos Imperial. At the same time, the French version of the song "Tu veux, tu veux pas", performed by Brigitte Bardot, among others, became popular in Europe. In 1970, Mina recorded the Portuguese version for the album Mina canta o Brasil.

== Track listing ==
7" single
A. "Zum zum zum" (Antonio Amurri, Bruno Canfora) – 2:41
B. "Sacumdì sacumdà (Nem Vem Que não Tem)" (Paolo Limiti, Carlos Imperial) – 2:33

== Charts ==
Chart performance for "Zum zum zum"
| Chart (1968) | Peak position |
|---|---|
| Italy (Musica e dischi) | 20 |

== Cover versions ==
- A little later in the same 1968, the song was recorded by French singer Sylvie Vartan, having had much more success, reaching top five of the Italian chart.
