= Canzonissima '68 =

Studio album by Mina
- Released: December 1968
- Genre: Pop
- Length: 36:24
- Language: Italian
- Label: PDU

Mina chronology
| Le più belle canzoni italiane interpretate da Mina (1968) | Canzonissima '68 (1968) | I discorsi (1969) |

Singles from Canzonissima '68
- 1. "Quand'ero piccola" Released: October 1968; 2. "Vorrei che fosse amore" Released: October 1968; 3. "Zum zum zum" Released: October 1968; 4. "Nè come nè perchè" Released: November 1968

Canzonissima '68 is a studio album by Italian singer Mina, released in 1968 by PDU and distributed by Durium.

== Overview ==
The album features songs previously published on 45 rpm records (except for "E sono ancora qui"), all of which were performed during the TV show Canzonissima of the 1968 season, where Mina was also the host. The tracks "Zum zum zum" and "Vorrei che fosse amore" were the show's theme songs.

== Track listing ==
Side A
| No. | Title | Writer(s) | Length |
|---|---|---|---|
| 1. | "Zum zum zum" | Antonio Amurri; Bruno Canfora | 2:41 |
| 2. | "Io innamorata" | Giorgio Calabrese; Augusto Martelli | 2:59 |
| 3. | "Sacumdì, sacumdà (Nem Vem Que não Tem)" | Carlos Imperial; Paolo Limiti | 2:37 |
| 4. | "Né come né perché" | Amurri; Canfora | 4:17 |
| 5. | "Un colpo al cuore" | Giancarlo Bigazzi; Mario Capuano | 3:19 |
| 6. | "La voce del silenzio" | Mogol; Limiti; Elio Isola | 3:23 |
| Total length: | | | 19:16 |

Side B
| No. | Title | Writer(s) | Length |
|---|---|---|---|
| 1. | "Vorrei che fosse amore" | Amurri; Canfora | 2:31 |
| 2. | "Quand'ero piccola" | Franco Migliacci; Bruno Zambrini; Luis Bacalov | 2:53 |
| 3. | "Deborah" | Paolo Conte; Vito Pallavicini | 2:58 |
| 4. | "Fantasia (Fantasy)" | Geoff Stephens; Calabrese | 3:03 |
| 5. | "Niente di niente (Break Your Promise)" | Thom Bell; William Hart; Calabrese | 3:14 |
| 6. | "E sono ancora qui" | Amurri; Bruno Canfora | 2:29 |
| Total length: | | | 17:08 |

== Personnel ==
- Mina – vocals
- Bruno Canfora – arrangement (A1, A4, B1, B6)
- Augusto Martelli – arrangement (A2, A3, A5, A6, B3, B4, B5)
- Luis Bacalov – arrangement (B2)

Credits are adapted from the album's liner notes.

== Charts ==
Chart performance for Canzonissima '68
| Chart (1968) | Peak position |
|---|---|
| Italian Albums (Musica e dischi) | 2 |
