= Mina con bignè =

Studio album by Mina
- Released: November 1977
- Recorded: 1977
- Studio: La Basilica, Milan
- Genre: Pop; disco
- Length: 45:18
- Language: Italian; Spanish
- Label: PDU

Mina chronology
Del mio meglio n. 4 (1977)	Mina con bignè (1977)	Mina quasi Jannacci (1978)

Singles from Mina con bignè
- 1. ""Giorni" / "Ormai"" Released: July 1976

Mina con bignè is a studio album by Italian singer Mina, released in November 1977 by PDU and distributed by EMI Italiana.

According to tradition, in 1977, Mina recorded one album with new songs, and another (Mina quasi Jannacci) with cover versions. Originally, both albums were sold together as a double album, later they went on sale separately.

== Critical reception ==
Claudio Milano of OndaRock highlighted the song "Ormai" in the album, stating that Mina had created a new form of drama by reaching artistic maturity. In 2015 Panorama magazine named Mina con bignè among the ten fundamental albums by Mina. Carlo Gibertini from Rolling Stone magazine included "Ma che bontà" in the list of the 15 best Italian songs about food, calling it "brilliant".

== Track listing ==
Side A
No.	Title	Writer(s)	Length
1.	"Da capo"	Marco Luberti; Riccardo Cocciante	3:16
2.	"Ma che bontà"	Enrico Riccardi	3:00
3.	"Amante amore"	Cristiano Malgioglio; Pino Presti	4:10
4.	"Oroscopo"	Malgioglio; Corrado Castellari	3:45
5.	"Balla chi balla (Bala com bala)"	Giorgio Calabrese; João Bosco	3:38
6.	"Giorni"	Luigi Albertelli; Shel Shapiro	4:50
Total length:			22:39

Side B
No.	Title	Writer(s)	Length
1.	"Ormai"	Andrea Lo Vecchio	4:08
2.	"Tradirò"	Simon Luca	4:20
3.	"Una ragazza in due (Down Came the Rain)"	Leo Chiosso; Mitch Murray; Robin Conrad	3:08
4.	"Señora melancolía"	Willy Morales	4:43
5.	"La tua voce dentro l'anima"	Mario Nobile	3:42
6.	"Che lui mi dia (Basta um dia)"	Sergio Bardotti; Chico Buarque de Hollanda	2:38
Total length:			22:39

== Personnel ==
- Mina – vocals
- Alberto Visentin – arrangement, conducting (A1)
- Gianni Ferrio – arrangement, conducting (A2, A5, B4, B6)
- Pino Presti – arrangement, conducting (A3, B3, B5)
- Sergio Parisini – arrangement, conducting (A4)
- Shel Shapiro – arrangement, conducting (A6)
- Rodolfo Grieco – arrangement, conducting (B1)
- Simon Luca – arrangement, conducting (B2)
- Alberto Mompellio – arrangement, conducting (B2)
- Luciano Tallarini – art direction
- Nuccio Rinaldis – sound engineer
- Mauro Balletti – photography

Credits are adapted from the album's liner notes.

== Charts ==
Chart performance for Mina con bignè and Mina quasi Jannacci
Chart (1977–1978)	Peak position
Italian Albums (Billboard)	5
Italian Albums (Musica e dischi)	4

Chart performance for Mina con bignè
Chart (1978)	Peak position
Italian Albums (Musica e dischi)	7
