= Giorni =

Single by Mina

from the album Mina con bignè
- Language: Italian
- A-side: "Ormai"
- Released: July 1977
- Recorded: 29 June 1977
- Studio: La Basilica, Milan
- Genre: Pop
- Length: 4:35
- Label: PDU
- Composer: Shel Shapiro
- Lyricist: Luigi Albertelli

Mina singles chronology
"Nuda" (1976)	"Giorni" / "Ormai" (1977)	"Città vuota (It's a Lonely Town)" (1978)

"Giorni" (English: "Days") is a song by Italian singer Mina. It was written by Shel Shapiro and Luigi Albertelli. Initially "Giorni" and the song "Ormai" (English: "Now"; written by Andrea Lo Vecchio) were released as a double A-sided single in July 1977 to support of Mina's new album Mina con bignè which was released later in November. The single stayed on the chart for 13 weeks, peaking at number 9.

== Critical reception ==
Claudio Milano of OndaRock noted that in "Ormai" Mina had created a new form of drama by reaching artistic maturity.

== Track listing ==
7" single
A1. "Giorni" – 4:35
A2. "Ormai" (Andrea Lo Vecchio) – 4:08

== Charts ==
Chart performance for "Giorni" / "Ormai"
Chart (1977)	Peak position
Italy (Musica e dischi)	9

== Cover versions ==
- In 1978, Katri Helena recorded a cover version of the song "Giorni" in Finnish called "Päivät" (adapted lyrics by Pertti Reponen) for the album Ystävä.
- In the same year, singer Ajda Pekkan recorded a Turkish version of "Giorni" called "Ya Sonra" with adapted lyrics by Fikret Şeneş.
