= Yo soy Mina =

Compilation album by Mina
- Released: 22 March 2011
- Recorded: 1968–1975
- Studio: La Basilica, Milan
- Genre: Europop
- Length: 71:39
- Label: EMI

Mina chronology
I Am Mina (2011)	Yo soy Mina (2011)	Piccolino (2011)

Yo soy Mina is a compilation album by Italian singer Mina, released on 22 March 2011 by EMI.

== Overview ==
This album is the Spanish-language counterpart of the 2011 trilingual Mina compilation series, the other two are performed in French (Je suis Mina) and English (I Am Mina). Yo soy Mina combines eighteen of the singer's numerous recordings in Spanish since 1968, many of which were originally released as singles only in Spanish-language countries and have never before been available either in long-playing or digital format.

The songs "Yo pienso en ti", "Distancias", "La mente cambia", "Canción para ti", "Dos o acaso tres", "Todo pasará, verás", "Los problemas del corazón" and "Yo qué puedo hacer" were released on CD for the first time. The Spanish version of "Nuur" was previously unreleased.

== Track listing ==
No.	Title	Writer(s)	Length
1.	"Juntos" ("Insieme")	Mogol; Lucio Battisti; Julio César	4:06
2.	"Grande, grande, grande" (Spanish version)	Alberto Testa; Tony Renis; Amart; Cholo Baltasar	3:57
3.	"Amor mío" ("Amor mio")	Mogol; Battisti; C. Mapel	4:50
4.	"No juego más" ("Non gioco più")	Gianni Ferrio; Roberto Lerici; Jaime Israel	2:53
5.	"¿Y qué?" ("E poi...")	Andrea Lo Vecchio; Shel Shapiro; Gefingal	4:48
6.	"Que nos separemos" ("Io e te da soli")	Mogol; Battisti; Mapel	4:32
7.	"Yo pienso en ti" ("E penso a te")	Mogol; Battisti; A. Belgrano	3:41
8.	"No lo creas" ("Non credere")	Ascri; Mogol; Roberto Soffici; César	4:15
9.	"Distancias" ("Distanze")	Luigi Albertelli; Soffici; César	4:36
10.	"Nuur" (Spanish version)	Ermanno Capelli; Osvaldo Miccichè; Belgrano	4:14
11.	"La mente cambia" ("La mente torna")	Mogol; Battisti; Belgrano	4:24
12.	"Canción para ti" ("Canzone per te")	Sergio Bardotti; Sergio Endrigo; César	3:34
13.	"Dos o acaso tres" ("Due o forse tre")	Lo Vecchio; Shapiro; Israel	4:00
14.	"Todo pasará, verás" ("Tutto passerà vedrai")	Lo Vecchio; Shapiro; Belgrano	3:27
15.	"De qué servirá" ("Che vale per me")	Carlo Alberto Rossi; Marisa Terzi; César	2:17
16.	"Los problemas del corazón" ("I problemi del cuore")	Claudio Daiano; Pino Massara; Belgrano	3:44
17.	"Balalda para mi muerte"	Angela Tarenzi; Astor Piazzolla; Horacio Ferrer; Semmdri	3:56
18.	"Yo qué puedo hacer" ("Uomo")	Enrico Riccardi; Albertelli; César	3:55
Total length:			71:39

== Personnel ==
- Mina – vocals
- Gianluca Lazzarin – digital mastering
- Mauro Baletti – cover art
- Giuseppe Spada – graphic design
- Gianni Rosco – illustrations

Credits are adapted from the album's liner notes.

== Charts ==
Chart performance for Yo soy Mina
Chart (2011)	Peak position
Italian Albums (FIMI)	55
Spanish Albums (Promusicae)	99
