= Lady Love (Katri Helena album) =

Studio album by Katri Helena
- Released: November 1976
- Recorded: 1976
- Studio: Finnvox and Finnlevy, Helsinki
- Genre: Pop
- Length: 41:25
- Language: Finnish
- Label: Scandia-Musiikki
- Producer: Chrisse Johansson

Katri Helena chronology
Paloma Blanca (1975)	Lady Love (1976)	Ystävä (1978)

Singles from Lady Love
- 1. "Kesän lapsi" Released: August 1976; 2. "Syysunelma" Released: October 1976; 3. "Lady Love" Released: April 1977; 4. "Palman mainingi" Released: May 1977

Lady Love is the eleventh studio album by Katri Helena, released in 1976 through Scandia-Musiikki. The album held the first place in the Finnish chart for fourteen weeks in a row.

== Track listing ==
1. "Syysunelma" (Veikko Samuli, Chrisse Johansson) – 2:39
2. "Lady Love" (Pietsch, Dietrich, Ekkehardt, Chrisse Johansson, Veikko Samuli) – 2:33
3. "Hän on mennyt pois (Tears and Souvenirs)" (Luigi Creatore, Hugo Peretti, George David Weiss, Chrisse Johansson) – 3:57
4. "Aurinkoon (Morning Sky)" (Hans Bouwens, Chrisse Johansson) – 3:14
5. "Hei jos mentäis naimisiin (Can't Give You Anything But My Love)" (Luigi Creatore, Hugo Peretti, George David Weiss, Raul Reiman) – 3:14
6. "Yksin kuljen sateeseen (Crying in the Rain)" (Carole King, Howard Greenfield, Pertti Reponen) – 2:00
7. "Bye-Bye (Na-Na Is the Saddest Word)" (Luigi Creatore, Hugo Peretti, George David Weiss, Raul Reiman) – 2:53
8. "Palman mainingit (Méditerranée)" (Eddy Marnay, Claude Morgan, Raul Reiman) – 3:18
9. "Ystäväin (My Poor Friend)" (Juan Carlos Calderon, Hans van Hemert, Chrisse Johansson) – 3:45
10. "Pappa kuplettejaan lauloi (My Daddy Was a Song and Dance Man)" (Digby Richards, Saukki) – 3:06
11. "On kaikki ennallaan (Ça va pas changer le monde)" (Joe Dassin, Pino Massara, Jukka Kuoppamäki) – 3:15
12. "Loppu tuskaa tuo aina (L'importante è finire)" (Alberto Anelli, Cristiano Malgioglio, Saukki) – 3:07
13. "Kesän lapsi (Viva America)" (Subway, Douglas Gylsbi, Chrisse Johansson) – 3:49

== Personnel ==
- Katri Helena – vocals
- Veikko Samuli – arrangement (1, 2, 6, 8, 11, 13)
- Olli Heikkilä – arrangement (3, 4, 9, 10, 12)
- Chrisse Johansson – producer
- Antti Joki – recording
- Jouko Ahera – recording
- Jukka Teittinen – recording
- Erik Uddström – cover art, photography

Credits are adapted from the album's liner notes.

== Charts ==
Chart performance for Lady Love
Chart (1976)	Peak position
Finnish Albums (Suomen virallinen lista)	1
