= La Mina =

Studio album by Mina
- Released: October 1975
- Recorded: 1975
- Studio: La Basilica, Milan
- Genre: Pop
- Length: 40:18
- Language: Italian
- Label: PDU

Mina chronology
Minacantalucio (1975)	La Mina (1975)	Singolare (1976)

Singles from La Mina
- 1. "L'importante è finire" Released: 1975

La Mina is a studio album by Italian singer Mina, released in October 1975 by PDU and distributed by EMI Italiana initially as double album with Minacantalucio.

== Track listing ==
Side A
No.	Title	Writer(s)	Length
1.	"Uappa"	Luigi Albertelli; Enrico Riccardi	3:20
2.	"Ti accetto come sei"	Gino Paoli; Lorenzo Raggi; Armando Brenna	3:54
3.	"Quasi come musica (A Song for You)"	Leon Russell; Gino Paoli; Claudio Daiano	4:19
4.	"Racconto (C'est comme l'arc en ciel)"	Hubert Giraud; Pierre Delanoë; Bruno Lauzi	3:47
5.	"Signora più che mai"	Fabio Massimo Cantini; Franca Evangelisti	4:47
Total length:			20:04

Side B
No.	Title	Writer(s)	Length
1.	"Immagina un concerto"	Andrea Lo Vecchio; Shel Shapiro	4:13
2.	"L'importante è finire"	Cristiano Malgioglio; Alberto Anelli	3:21
3.	"Come un uomo (Comme un homme)"	Giraud; Delanoë; Lauzi	3:07
4.	"Tu no"	Cantini; Evangelisti; Antonio Coggio	6:08
5.	"Di già"	Lo Vecchio; Shapiro	3:25
Total length:			20:14

== Personnel ==
- Mina – vocals
- Enrico Riccardi – arrangement (A1)
- Pino Presti – arrangement (A2, A3, B2, B5)
- Gabriel Yared – arrangement (A4, B3)
- Toto Torquati – arrangement (A5, B4)
- Shel Shapiro – arrangement (B1)
- Nuccio Rinaldis – sound engineer
- Mauro Balletti – photography
- Luciano Tallarini – cover art

Credits are adapted from the album's liner notes.

== Charts ==
=== Weekly charts ===
Weekly chart performance for La Mina and Minacantalucio
Chart (1976)	Peak position
Italian Albums (Musica e dischi)	3

Weekly chart performance for La Mina
Chart (1976)	Peak position
Italian Albums (Billboard)	5
Italian Albums (Musica e dischi)	5

=== Year-end charts ===
Year-end chart performance for La Mina and Minacantalucio
Chart (1976)	Position
Italian Albums (Musica e dischi)	5
