= Childproofing =

Act of making an environment or object safer for children

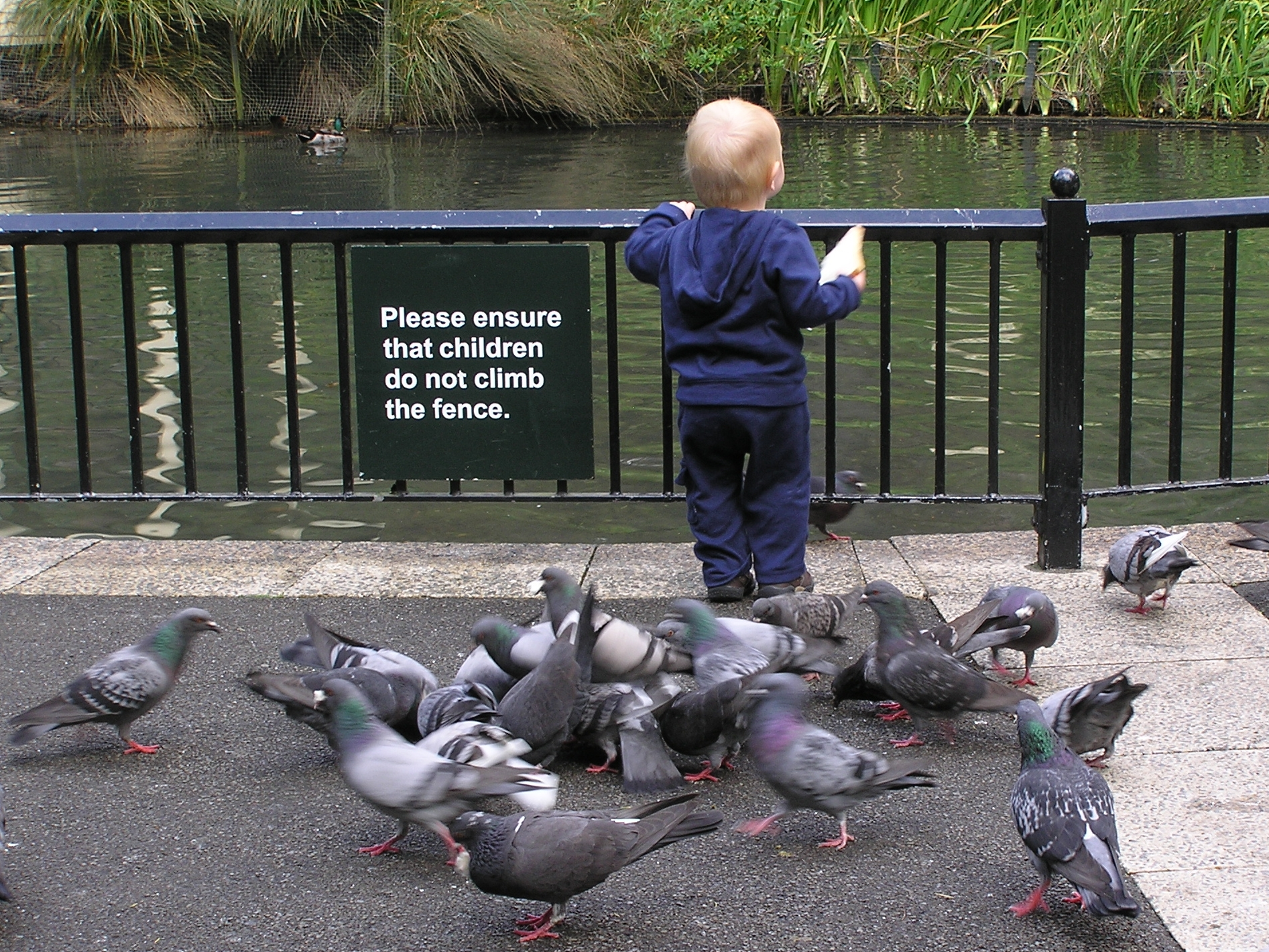
A childproof fence

Childproofing (also called baby proofing) is the act of making an environment or object safe for children. This reduces risks to a level considered acceptable by a society, an institution, or to specific parents. Childproofing may include restriction of children to safe areas or preventing children from reaching unsafe areas. This can be accomplished by the parent or by hiring a professional for assistance. Childproofing is gaining more prominence now that parents have greater access to information on child injury and a wide variety of products are available to help prevent it. It has become the top-of-mind for parents so much so that hotels and child-friendly resorts are offering "child-proof" rooms.

== Electrical safety ==
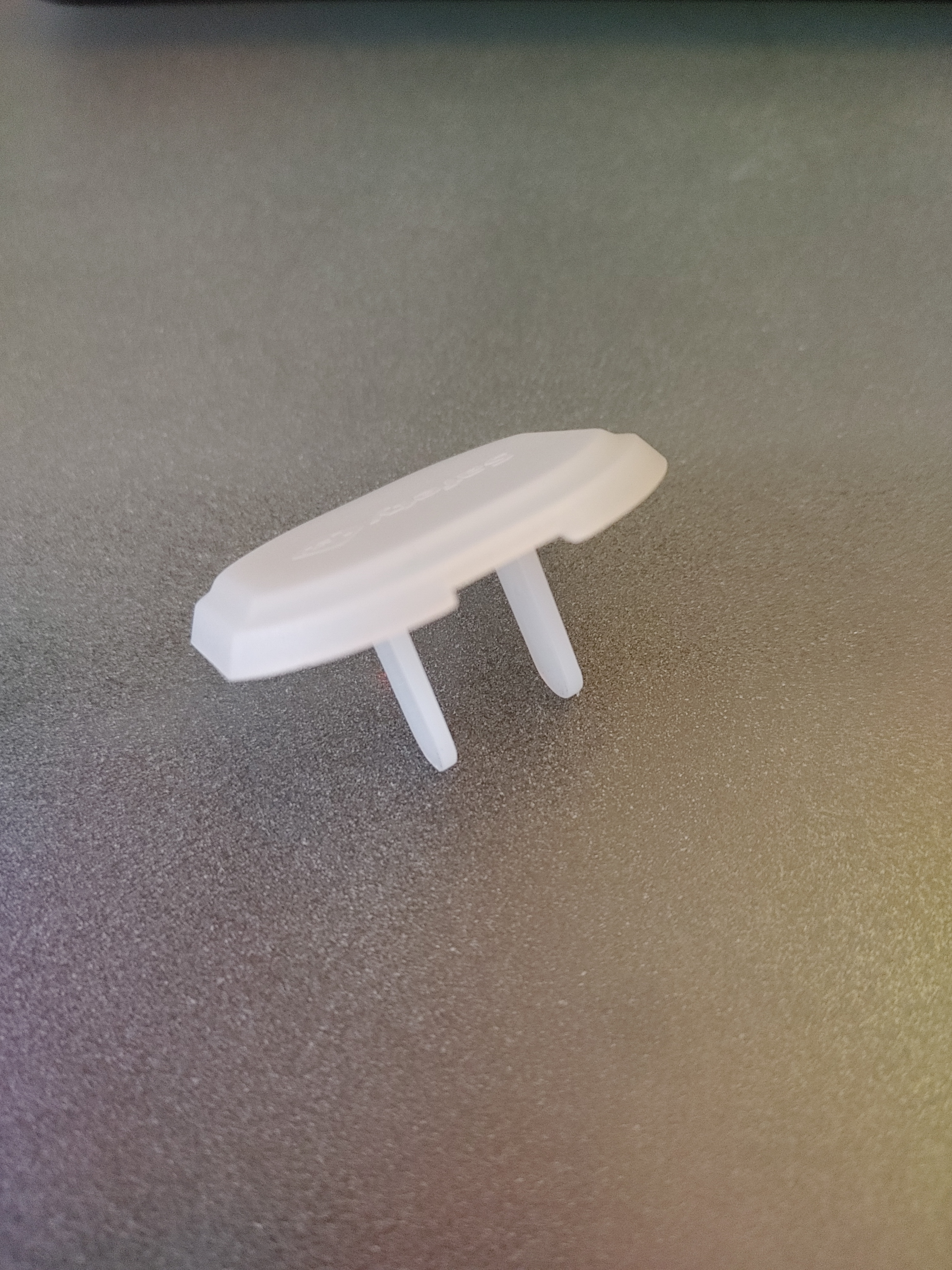
A plastic electrical outlet cover

One of the more common concerns of child safety is the potential for electrocution or serious injury when an object, such as a key or metal paper clip, is inserted into an electrical outlet. Many childproofing devices exist that block access to the electrical outlets. These devices may be as simple as plastic units that plug into each individual socket but this type could be removed by a toddler or parents might forget to re-insert them after using the outlet. Once removed from the outlet, most plastic plug-in caps become potential choking hazards. Other devices such as sliding outlet covers replace the current outlet plate but still allow parents access to use the outlet.

The United States government publishes a free brochure for children that discusses electrical safety.

== Physical access ==
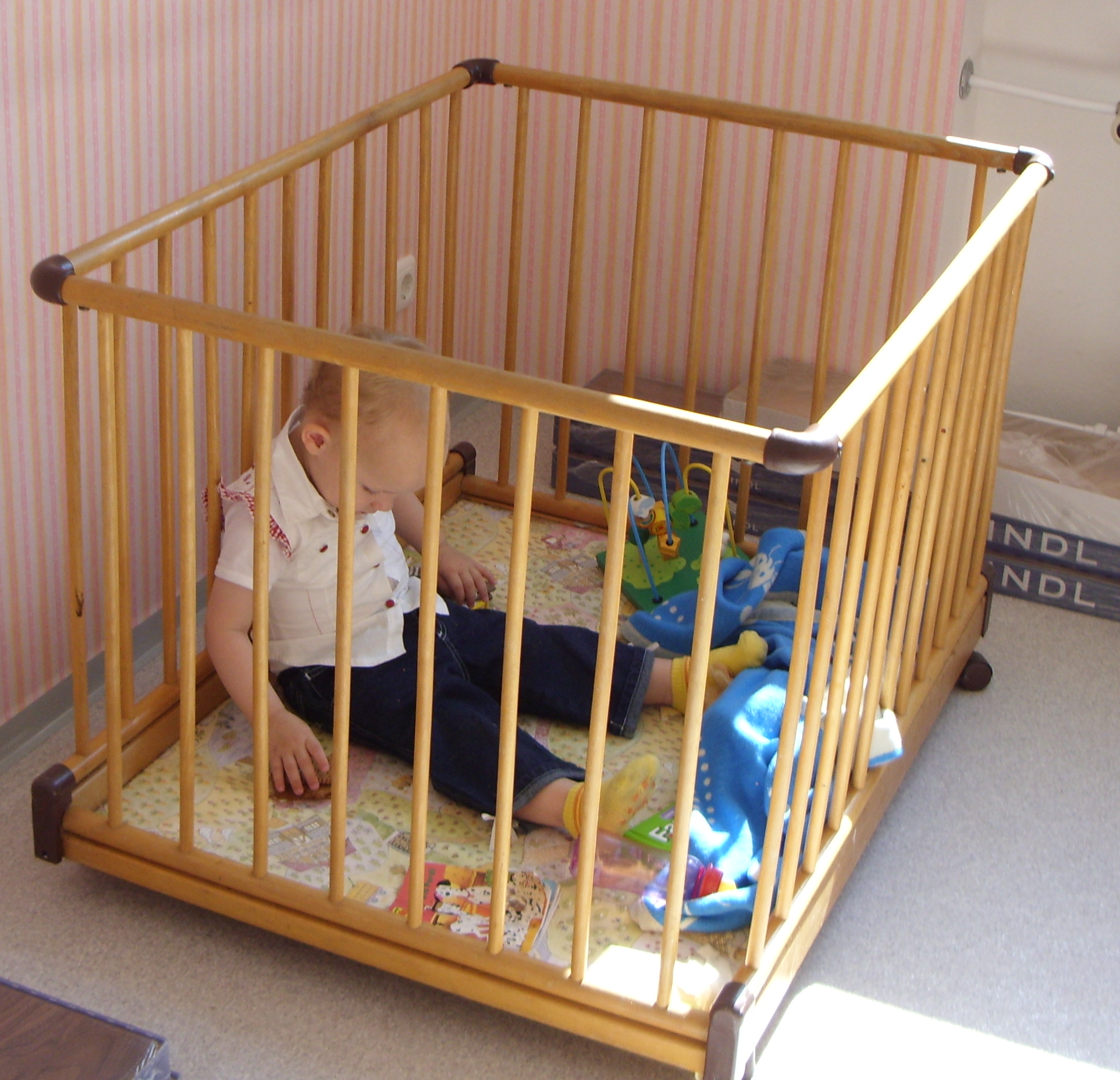
Common playpen

One of the more common methods of childproofing is to move potentially dangerous items to higher levels, beyond the reach of young children. This may include small items that pose a choking hazard, sharp items that might poke or cut a child, breakable items such as glass vases and anything that is long and flexible, like ropes and cables. Adults who want to get a better understanding of the potential dangers around the house can get down to the eye level of a child; this will enable them to see the house the way the child does.

Drawers, cabinets, and other openables can be fitted with inexpensive devices that prevent easy opening. External devices are easily inserted around or between handles; they work by restricting movement unless the locking mechanism is released. Another type of lock is internal: it consists of a bendable plastic rod with a blunt hook on one side, and is situated on the inside of the drawer or cabinet. These devices are inexpensive and easy to install.

A playpen is another device that is commonly used as a form of childproofing, by restricting the movement of a child while resting, playing or bottle feeding, requiring a somewhat lower level of supervision while in use. Many playpens are portable, making them an alternative when the parent and child are visiting a home that has not been "childproofed".

Safety gates are used to help prevent a child from accessing an area of a house, especially the stairway, or to allow an exterior door to be open for ventilation while restricting movement of a child. Pressure gates and hardware mounted gates are available. Pressure gates can be dislodged by children and should not be used at the top of stairs. In some situations, pressure gates at the top of stairs have caused serious injury when a child has run against it or when a parent has fallen trying to step over the gate. Hardware mounted gates are the most secure option and should be installed securely into wall studs.

Interior doors should be closed and secured to restrict a child's access to such areas as garages, basements, laundry rooms, home offices & gyms, bathrooms, or any other potentially hazardous area. Many different types of door latches are available. from simple door knob covers to top-of-door latches that can be operated from both sides of the door.

== Drowning ==
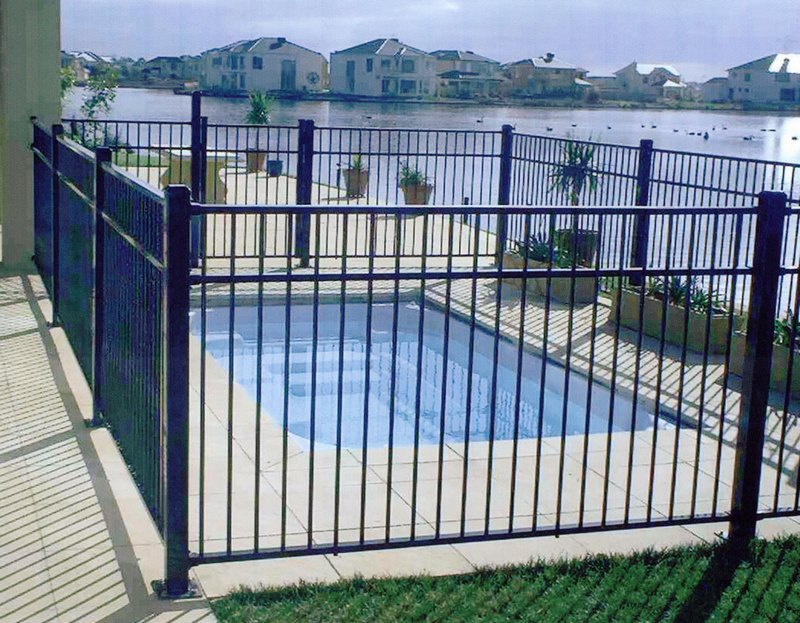
A pool fence prevents small children from falling into water and drowning

In 2014, drownings were the leading cause of unintentional deaths for children 1–4 years old in the United States and most drownings occur in home swimming pools. A pool fence is a safety barrier that completely blocks access to a swimming pool, and may be permanent or removable. They are commonly used to improve pool safety and to help prevent small children from accidentally falling into the pool and drowning. The lack of a pool fence can greatly increase a child's risk of drowning. A four-sided isolation fence (separating the pool area from the house and yard) reduces a child's risk of drowning 83% compared to three-sided property-line fencing. Inside the home, the bathroom and the bathtub are an area of safety concern for drowning. Parents should never leave any water in the bathtub after they have finished a bath session as only a small amount of standing water can create a scenario for drowning when left unattended.

== Chemical access ==
It is common to store a number of potentially dangerous chemicals under the kitchen & bathroom sinks or in the laundry room, such as drain cleaners, ammonia, and products containing chlorine and various chemical polishes, which are one of the most common causes of accidental child poisoning. The safest solution is to relocate these hazards to an out-of-reach latched cabinet. There are also a number of special latches that lock lower cabinets and require two actions to open, reducing the chance that a small child may gain access.

== Medicine access ==
A medicine cabinet

Child-resistant packaging is now common for medications. There are a variety of methods to secure medications, including caps that must be pinched or pushed down while turning. It may be required by regulation for prescription drugs, for over the counter medications, for pesticides, or for household chemicals where there is a significant risk of death from ingestion. Patients can request medications come in non-protected bottles at their pharmacy, but this is not recommended for patients with young children in the home. Because some children will defeat child-resistant caps, medicine should always be stored up out of reach in latched cabinets or closets.

== Fire safety ==
When childproofing a house in terms of fire safety, it is essential that the home be equipped with properly maintained smoke alarms on every level both inside and outside of sleeping areas. Smoke alarms that are linked up to one another are ideal because if one alarm sounds, they all will. It is important to make sure that there are both ionization AND photoelectric smoke alarms in the house, or a dual-sensor smoke alarm which contains both. This is because each type of sensor is specialized at detecting distinctly different, yet potentially fatal fires. Parents must be sure to test smoke alarms monthly and change alkaline batteries at least once every year.

A fire escape plan is essential for all residents to know in case of an emergency. Parents of infants and young toddlers should be prepared and in agreement on what actions to take in order to escape a fire, and children should also be taught the escape plan once old enough. Ensure that safety bars on windows can be quickly removed from the inside.

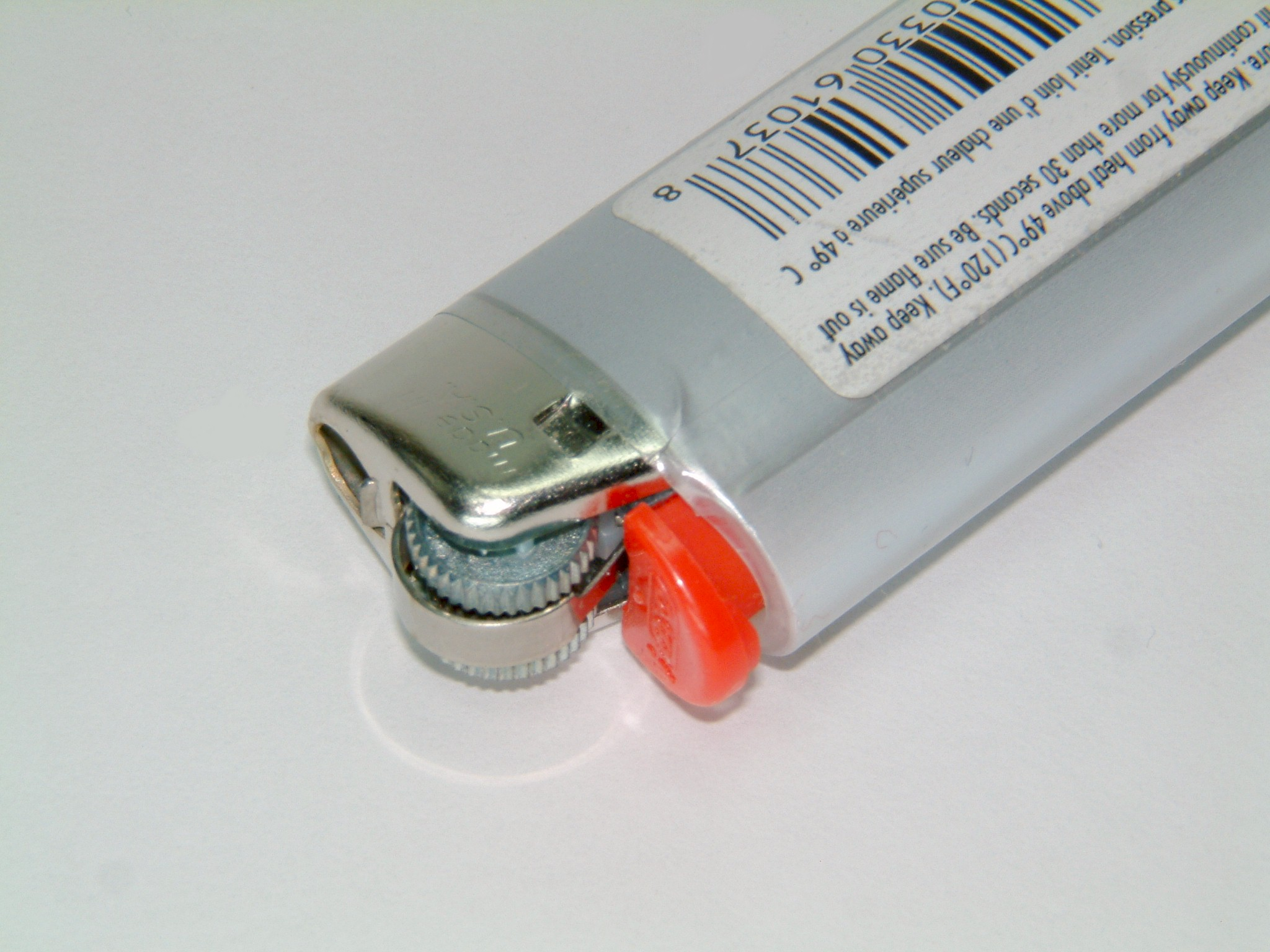
Disposable lighter with built-in child guard. It requires more dexterity and strength to get the abrasive wheel to rotate due to a spring cover.

Disposable lighters sold in Australia, Canada, New Zealand, and the United States (since 1994) must incorporate child-resistant features. The European Union added the same standard in 2010. The inexpensive alterations have resulted in fewer juvenile-set fires and deaths. One firefighter was quoted as saying "Children love to play with lighters. They figure it out", while another fire fighting official said "kids' brains do not have the ability to understand how dangerous fire is, and how quickly it can spread".

== Legal aspects ==
Due to a number of high-profile legal cases, many manufacturers now produce goods with built-in safety measures, such as child-resistant locks. The U.S. Consumer Product Safety Commission has attempted to increase awareness of potential hazards and has made it easier for consumers to report potentially dangerous products.

== See also ==
- Baby gate
- Babysitting
- Child care
