= Non gioco più =

Single by Mina
- Language: Italian
- B-side: "La scala buia"
- Released: 1974
- Genre: Blues
- Length: 2:53
- Label: PDU
- Composer: Gianni Ferrio
- Lyricist: Roberto Lerici

Mina singles chronology
"Und dann..." (1974)	"Non gioco più" (1974)	"Et puis ça sert à quoi" (1974)

Music video
- "Non gioco più" on YouTube

"Non gioco più" (English: "I'm not playing anymore") is a song by Italian singer Mina, released as a single in 1974 by PDU. The song reached number two on the Italian Singles chart, staying in the top five for nine consecutive weeks. The song was not included in any studio album, but was included in the compilation Del mio meglio n. 3 (1975).

The song was written as a television theme song for the show Milleluci, which aired in prime time on Saturdays and was hosted by Raffaella Carrà and Mina herself. Music, arrangement and conducting by Gianni Ferrio, and lyrics by Roberto Lerici. In fact, Mina started saying goodbye to the scene with this song. She no longer participated in major music programs on TV, and Milleluci became the last show where she appeared as a presenter.

The harmonica is played by the Belgian musician Toots Thielemans.

Mina also recorded a Spanish version of the song called "No juego más" (adapted lyrics by Jaime Israel). This version was first released on the album Mina canta en español in 1975 in Spain. For the first time in Italy, it was published on the compilation Collection latina (2001) and later on Yo soy Mina (2011).

The song "La scala buia", written by Riccardo Pazzaglia, Gianni Boncompagni and Franco Bracardi, was used as a b-side. The song was also included in the compilation Del mio meglio n. 3, and its Spanish version called "Me siento libre" included in Mina canta en español.

== Track listing ==
7" single
A. "Non gioco più" – 2:53
B. "La scala buia" (Riccardo Pazzaglia, Gianni Boncompagni, Franco Bracardi) – 3:50

== Charts ==
Chart performance for "Non gioco più"
Chart (1974)	Peak position
Italy (Billboard)	2
Italy (Musica e dischi)	2

== Cover versions ==
- In 1976, singer Nilüfer recorded a Turkish version of the song "La scala buia" called "Baştan Anlat" (translated by Ülkü Aker) for Selam Söyle.
- In 2004, the band Marlene Kuntz recorded a cover version of the song "Non gioco più" for the EP Fingendo la poesia.
