= Gross motor skill =

Motor skills involving large muscle groups

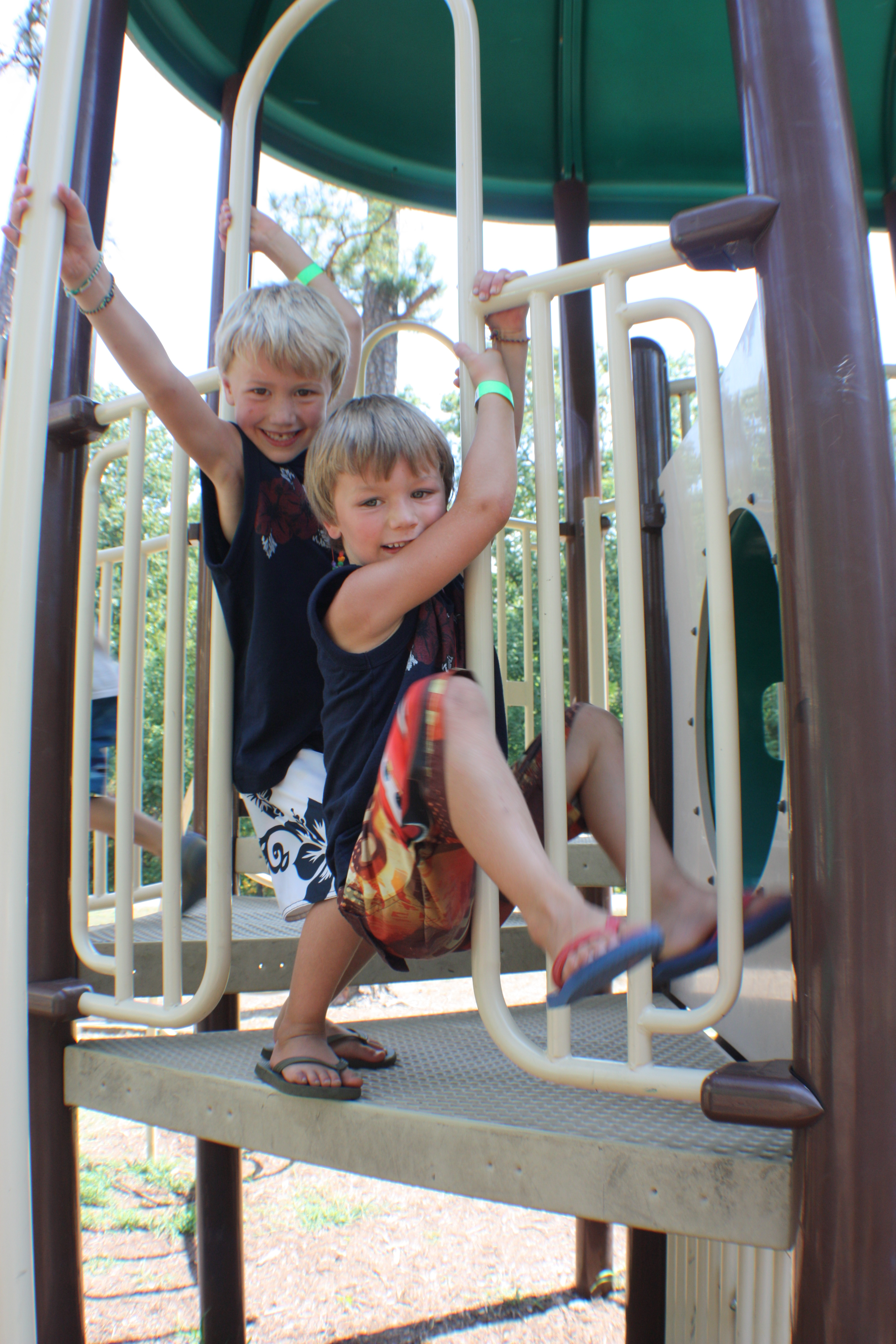
Playground structures often help children to develop gross motor skills such as climbing and balancing.

Gross motor skills are the abilities usually acquired during childhood as part of a child's motor learning. By the time they reach two years of age, almost all children are able to stand up, walk and run, walk up stairs, etc. These skills are built upon, improved and better controlled throughout early childhood, and continue in refinement throughout most of the individual's years of development into adulthood. These gross movements come from large muscle groups and whole body movement. These skills develop in a head-to-toe order. The children will typically learn head control, trunk stability, and then standing up and walking. It is shown that children exposed to outdoor play time activities will develop better gross motor skills.

== Types of motor skills ==
Motor skills are movements and actions of the muscles. Typically, they are categorized into two groups: gross motor skills and fine motor skills. Gross motor skills are involved in movement and coordination of the arms, legs, and other large body parts and movements. Gross motor skills can be further divided into two subgroups of locomotor skills and object control skills. Gross locomotor skills would include running, jumping, sliding, and swimming. Object control skills would include throwing, catching and kicking. Fine motor skills are involved in smaller movements that occur in the wrists, hands, fingers, and the feet and toes. They participate in smaller actions such as picking up objects between the thumb and finger, writing carefully, and even blinking. These two motor skills work together to provide coordination. Less developed children focus on their gross movements, while more developed children have more control over their fine movements.

== Development of posture ==
Gross motor skills, as well as many other activities, require postural control. Infants need to control the heads to stabilize their gaze and to track moving objects. They also must have strength and balance in their legs to walk. Newborn infants cannot voluntarily control their posture. Within a few weeks, though, they can hold their heads erect, and soon they can lift their heads while prone. By 2 months of age, babies can sit while supported on a lap or an infant seat, but sitting independently is not accomplished until 6 or 7 months of age. Standing also develops gradually across the first year of life. By about 8 months of age, infants usually learn to pull themselves up and hold on to a chair, and they often can stand alone by about 10 to 12 months of age. There is a new device called a "Standing Dani" developed to help special needs children with their posture.

== Learning to walk ==
Walking upright requires being able to stand up and balance position from one foot to the other. Although infants usually learn to walk around the time of their first birthday, the neural pathways that control the leg alternation component of walking are in place from a very early age, possibly even at birth or before. When 1- to 2-month-olds, walking 15 months fifteen are given support with their feet in contact with a motorized treadmill, they show well-coordinated, alternating steps. If it were not for the problem of switching balance from one foot to the other, babies could walk earlier. Tests were performed on crawling and walking babies where slopes were placed in front of the path and the babies had to decide whether or not it was safe. The tests proved that babies who just learned how to walk did not know what they were capable of and often went down slopes that were not safe, whereas experienced walkers knew what they could do. Practice plays a big part in teaching a child how to walk.

Vision does not have an effect on muscle growth, however it could slow down the child's process of learning to walk. According to the nonprofit Blind Children Center, "Without special training, fully capable infants who are visually impaired may not learn to crawl or walk at an appropriate age and gross and fine motor skills will not properly develop." When the child is not able to see an object then there is no motivation for the child to try to reach for it. Therefore, they do not want to learn independently. Children with visual impairments often experience a delay in achieving static balance, and use objects, such as furniture, for balance longer than children with normal vision.

Learning to walk is done by modeling others and watching them. Children when put in environments with older children will observe and try and copy their movements. This helps the child learn through trial and error. Children learning to walk will imitate other children, developing walking and balance skills more quickly than if relying on their own errors. Visually impaired children may need physical therapy to help them learn these gross motor skills faster. One hour of therapy each week is not sufficient so parents have to make sure they are involved in this process. The parent can help by telling the baby the direction where an object is and encourage them to get it. Parents must have patience because every child has their own developmental schedule and it is even more true for the children with special needs. Focus on the child's progress is more important than comparison of the child's development to other children.

== Infancy development ==
It has been observed by scientists that motor skills generally develop from the center to the body outward and head to tail. Babies need to practice their skills; therefore they will grow and strengthen better. They need space and time to explore in their environment and use their muscles. "Tummy-time" is a good example of this. At first they are only able to lay their belly on the floor but by around two months they start to gain muscle to raise their head and chest off the ground. Some are also able to go on their elbows. They will also start to kick and bend their legs while lying there, this helps to prepare for crawling. By four months they are able to start to control their head and hold it steady while sitting up. Rolling from belly to back movements is started. At about five months the baby will start to wiggle their limbs to strengthen crawling muscles. Infants can start to sit up by themselves and put some weight on their legs as they hold onto something for support by six months. As they enter their first-year caregivers needs to be more active. The babies will want to get into everything so the house needs to become 'baby proofed'. Babies are able to start to reach and play with their toys too. It is said that the use of baby walkers or devices that help to hold the baby upright are said to delay the process of walking. Research has been found that it delays developing the core torso strength, which can lead to different issues down in their future. Around ten months they should be able to stand on their own. Throughout their years of life different motor skills are formed. (Oswalt) With regards to the gait pattern, study shows that infant at 12 months old exhibit larger mediolateral motion, which may be caused by weak muscle strength and lack of stability. They also show a synchronized use of hip and shoulder while they are walking, which is different from a mature gait pattern performed by adults. The ankles didn't move as much among 12-month infants as compared to that of adults performing a mature walking.

=== Development in the second year ===
Development in the second year of life, toddlers become more motorically skilled and mobile. They are no longer content with being contained in a playpen and want to move and explore their surroundings. Child development experts believe that motor activity during the second year is vital to the child's competent development and that few restrictions, except for safety, should be placed on their motoric adventures. By 13 to 18 months, toddlers can move up and down steps and carry toys. Once they reach the top of the stairs though, they are not able to get back down. They also begin to move from one position to another more smoothly. (Oswalt) Significant changes in gait patterns are also observed in the second year. Infants in the second year have a discordant use of hip and shoulder while walking, which is closer to an adult walking pattern. They are also able to utilize the range of motion of their ankles, toes, and heels more, which is similar to a mature walk. By 18 to 24 months, can move quicker or run for a short distance along with other motor skills. They also start to walk backwards and in circles and begin to run. They can also not only walk up the stairs with their hands and feet but are now able to hold onto the handrail and walk up. Near the end of their second year, complex gross motor skills begin to develop including throwing and kicking. Their skills becomes more natural. Pedaling a tricycle and jumping in place is acquired. At the end they are very mobile and can go from place to place. It is normal for them to get themselves into small situations that could be dangerous such as walking into the street because their brain can't send the information fast enough to their feet. Parents need to keep an eye on their children at all times. (Oswalt) In a majority of the select kinematic and kinetic variables, there are greater differences between two-year-old children and four-year-old-children than there are between four year old children and six year old children. The variables for which there were significant differences tended to be in displacement, velocity, and magnitude of force measurements.

== Development of children with disabilities ==
Children with disabilities who are as young as seven months can learn to drive a power wheelchair using a joystick interface.

This chair may decrease the rate of development of the child's gross motor skills, but there are ways to compensate for this. These children usually work with a physical therapist to help with their leg movements. Walkers and other devices are used to help aide this process and avoid obstacles. The negative side to this is that they are limited in their mobility. There is research out to find a device to encourage children to explore their environment while gaining their gross motor skills. This will also hopefully help them with their exercise.

A 2017 Cochrane review found that for children with delays associated with cerebral palsy or Down Syndrome up to the age of six the use of a treadmill may accelerate the development of independent walking.

== Childhood ==
Early childhood is a critical period for the development of fundamental motor skills. Children in preschooler, develop depending on their interactions with the surrounding environment. A child in an encouraging environment with constructive feedback will develop fundamental motor skills at a faster rate. Typically, females perform better fundamental movement skills at an earlier age than males. Although many studies prove this to be true, it is dominantly true in walking. Girls typically go through maturity faster than boys do, causing them to also be less active. This allows boys to be deemed more active, due to the fact that they mature much later than their opposing gender. However, this does not give a clear answer as to whether or not girls learn to walk before boys. One would think that learning to walk sooner would allow for a higher activity level, though since girls have a noticeably lower activity level than boys, one would assume that this would mean that girls would learn to walk after boys. But since they mature earlier, that would involve the walking stage. As they grow older, children become more proficient in their tasks allowing them to use their high developed skill for events such as sports where these motor skills are highly required. Children who do not master fundamental motor skills are less likely to participate in sport games during childhood and adolescence. This is one explanation of why boys tend to be more or less athletic than their opposite gender. Children at a younger age might not be able to perform at the level of older children, but their ability to learn and improve on motor skills is much higher.

At 3 years of age, children enjoy simple movements, such as hopping, jumping, and running back and forth, just for the sheer delight of performing these activities. However, the findings in the article "The relationship between fine and gross motor ability, self-perceptions and self-worth in children and adolescents" it stated that there was not a statistical significance in athletic competence and social competence. This correlation coefficient was .368 and simply means that there is a low correlation between those two relationships. A child being able to perform certain gross and fine motor skills does not mean that they will have the ability to demonstrate social skills such as conversation, social awareness, sensitivity, and body language. This Their body stability is focused on the child's dynamic body base and is related to their visual perceptions such as height, depth, or width. A study was done to assess motor skill development and the overall rate and level of growth development. This study shows that at the preschool age children develop more goal-directed behaviors. This plays a big role, because their learning focuses around play and physical activity. While assessing the gross motor skills in children can be challenging, it is essential to do so in order to ensure that children are prepared to interact with the environment they live in. Different tests are given to these children to measure their skill level.

At age 4, children continue to do the same actions as they did at age 3, but further their moving. They are beginning to be able to go down the stairs with one foot on each step. At 5 years of age, they are fully able to go down the stairs one foot at a time in addition to improvements in their balance and running. Their body stability becomes more mature and their trunk is fixed on their posture. Performances are more fluent and are less influenced by factors such a slope and width. During middle and late childhood, children's motor development becomes much smoother and more coordinated than it was in early childhood. As they age, children become able to have control over their bodies and have an increased attention span. Having children practice a sport helps them develop their coordination through the use of the varied movements involved in the sport. Participating in a sport also shows benefits in social development for children. Teachers will suggest that their students may need occupational therapists in different situations. Students could get frustrated doing writing exercises if they are having difficulties with their writing skills. It also may affect the teacher because it is illegible. Some children also may have reports of their "hands getting tired". There are many occupational therapists out there today to give students the help they need. These therapists were once used when something was seriously wrong with your child but now they are used to help children be the best they can be. According to the article "The Relationship Between Fundamental Motor Skills and Outside-School Physical Activity of Elementary School Children", the developmental level of overhand throwing and jumping of elementary kids is related to skill specific physical activity outside of school. In the studies done, boys were seen to have higher scores in developmental level of overhand throwing and higher scores for the Caltrac accelerometer, rapid-trunk movement, and motor skill related physical activities. Girls were seen to have higher scores in lower-intensity physical activities and physical inactivity. The study showed that the developmental level of the fundamental skills (overhand-throwing and jumping) are related to skill-specific physical activity outside of school in elementary children. We can conclude that boys will develop fundamental motor skills more quickly than girls will. In other studies it has been seen that having a higher motor proficiency leads to kids being more physically active, and in most cases more athletic. This can lead to some issues in childhood development such as issues with weight, and increasing the public health epidemic of childhood obesity.

== Adolescence and adulthood ==
Between the ages of 7 and 12, children's running speed continues to increase and they get better at motor tasks such as skipping. Along with horizontal movement skills, they also improve with vertical/diagonal movement skills such as jumping, as well as in skills involving strength and precision like throwing, kicking, hitting a baseball with a bat, or dribbling a basketball. Gross motor skills usually continue improving during adolescence. The peak of physical performance is before 30, between 18 and 26. Even though athletes continue to exceed the performance of their predecessors—running faster, jumping higher, and lifting more weight—the age at which they reach their peak performance has remained virtually the same. After age 30, most functions begin to decline. Older adults move slower than younger adults. This can be moving from one place to another or continually moving. Exercising regularly and maintaining a healthy lifestyle can slow this process. Aging individuals who are active and biologically healthy perform motor skills at a higher level than their less active, less healthy aging counterparts.

== See also ==
- Apraxia
- Developmental coordination disorder
- Fine motor skill
