= Singolare =

Studio album by Mina
- Released: October 1976
- Recorded: 1976
- Studio: La Basilica, Milan
- Genre: Pop
- Length: 41:45
- Language: Italian
- Label: PDU

Mina chronology
Minacantalucio (1975)	Singolare (1976)	Plurale (1976)

Singles from Singolare
- 1. "Nuda" Released: May 1976

Singolare is a studio album by Italian singer Mina, released in 1976 by PDU and distributed by EMI Italiana. It was originally distributed as a double album with Plurale.

== Track listing ==
Side A
No.	Title	Writer(s)	Length
1.	"Sognando"	Don Backy	4:05
2.	"Devo dirti addio (Pra dizer adeus)"	Edu Lobo; Torquato Neto; Bruno Lauzi	3:58
3.	"Colpa mia"	Roberto Soffici; Dante Pieretti; Simon Luca	4:02
4.	"L'ultima volta"	Fausto Leali; Mamared (Milena Cantù)	3:10
5.	"Terre lontane"	Mino Reitano; Franco Reitano; Ermanno Capelli; Bruno Longhi	4:05
Total length:			19:20

Side B
No.	Title	Writer(s)	Length
1.	"Ancora dolcemente"	Fabio Massimo Cantini; Luigi Lopez; Paolo Cassella	4:55
2.	"Io camminerò"	Umberto Tozzi; Giancarlo Bigazzi	4:25
3.	"Triste"	Antonio Amurri; Gianni Ferrio	5:35
4.	"Cablo"	Camillo Castellari; Corrado Castellari	3:30
5.	"Nuda"	Don Backy	4:00
Total length:			22:25

== Personnel ==
- Mina – vocals
- Pino Presti – arrangement, conducting (A1, A4, A5, B2, B5)
- Gianni Ferrio – arrangement, conducting (A2, B3)
- Roberto Soffici – arrangement, conducting (A3)
- Simon Luca – arrangement, conducting (A3)
- Massimo Salerno – arrangement, conducting (A4)
- Tony Mimms – arrangement, conducting (B1)
- Nuccio Rinaldis – sound engineer
- Luciano Tallarini – cover art
- Mauro Balletti – photography

Credits are adapted from the album's liner notes.

== Charts ==
Chart performance for Singolare and Plurale
Chart (1976–1977)	Peak position
Italian Albums (Billboard)	2
Italian Albums (Musica e dischi)	1

Chart performance for Singolare
Chart (1976)	Peak position
Italian Albums (Musica e dischi)	4
