= L'importante è finire =

Single by Mina

from the album La Mina
- Language: Italian
- B-side: "Quando mi svegliai"
- Released: 1975
- Genre: Pop
- Length: 3:22
- Label: PDU
- Composer: Alberto Anelli
- Lyricist: Cristiano Malgioglio
- Producer: Pino Presti

Mina singles chronology
| "Et puis ça sert à quoi" (1974) | "L'importante è finire" (1975) | "Nuda" (1976) |

"L'importante è finire" (English: "The important thing is to finish") is a song recorded by Italian singer Mina for her 1975 album La Mina. The song was written by Alberto Anelli and Cristiano Malgioglio.

== Overview ==
The song became the first and only single from the album. Immediately after its release, it was censored and banned from central radio and television because of its sexual overtones. Nevertheless, the song became commercially successful, reaching the second place in the chart, where it spent seven weeks in a row – "Sabato pomeriggio" by Claudio Baglioni did not miss her on the first place, – in total, the song spent 31 weeks there. The song "Quando mi svegliai" was chosen as the B-side (words by Daniele Pace, music by Mario Panzeri and Corrado Conti).

Pino Presti's arrangement, still considered in the 2020s to be current and taken as a model by the latest generation of artists such as Marracash, is characterized by a slow Bossa nova rhythm, a bassline with shades of funk, the percussive supports of the Hammond and the groove of the Roland drum machine (which with the acoustic guitar, the melodic interventions of the moog and the congas) offer Mina the ideal support for a performance of her own.

Mina recorded a French version called "Pour en finir comment faire" (adaptation by Pierre Delanoë) and an English version "Take Me" (adaptation by Norman Newell), the first was released as a single, in 2011 both were included on the compilations Je suis Mina and I Am Mina accordingly.

== Critical reception ==
Giusy Cascio of TV Sorrisi e Canzoni included "L'importante é finire" in the list of 15 songs that made Mina a star, and called it one of the most sensual in her repertoire.

== Track listing ==
7" single
A. "L'importante è finire" – 3:22
B. "Quando mi svegliai" – 3:07

== Charts ==
=== Weekly charts ===
Weekly chart performance for "L'importante è finire"
| Chart (1975) | Peak position |
|---|---|
| Italy (Billboard) | 2 |
| Italy (Musica e dischi) | 2 |

Weekly chart performance for "Quando mi svegliai"
| Chart (1975) | Peak position |
|---|---|
| Italy (Musica e dischi) | 20 |

=== Year-end charts ===
Year-end chart performance for "L'importante è finire"
| Chart (1969) | Position |
|---|---|
| Italy (Musica e dischi) | 1 |

== Cover versions ==
- The lyricist Cristiano Malgioglio also recorded the song. In 2010, an updated version was included in the album Cara Mia ti scrivo....
- Japanese singer Masako Togawa recorded a Japanese-language version titled “終りが大切” for her 1976 album インモラル物語.
- Finnish singer Katri Helena in 1976 released a Finnish version of the song called "Loppu tuskaa tuo aina", the song was included in the album Lady Love.
- Raffaella Carrà recorded a Spanish version of the song called "Lo importante es... amarle" for her album Hola Raffaella (1990).
- In 1991, Yugoslav Croatian singer Ksenija Erker presented a cover version on her album Ciao Italia.
- The Spanish version of the song was recorded by singer Mónica Naranjo for the tribute album Minage (2001).
- For her 2001 album Heart, Amanda Lear also recorded a cover version of the song.
- In 2008, French singer Catherine Ringer presented a cover version on her live album Catherine Ringer chante Les Rita Mitsouko and more à la Cigale.
