= Anna mulle tähtitaivas =

Studio album by Katri Helena
- Released: 1992
- Language: Finnish

Anna mulle tähtitaivas (English: Give Me the Starry Sky) is an album by Finnish singer Katri Helena, released in 1992 after a five-year recording hiatus. The album sold enough copies to earn double platinum certification, making it the best-selling album of Katri Helena’s career up to that point.

In addition to the album’s success, the title track—written by Jukka Kuoppamäki and also released as a single—became a major hit. In a 1995 newspaper interview, Katri Helena expressed surprise that the highest-selling album of her career came only after 32 years of performing.

In a 1997 interview, Kuoppamäki described "Anna mulle tähtitaivas" as one of the finest songs of his career, calling it a kind of modern prayer:

“When writing lyrics, you don’t know how seriously they will be taken—how someone battered by life might pin the words to their corkboard.”

Katri Helena likewise said that she only gradually came to understand how serious the song’s message is beneath its upbeat exterior.

The album includes four additional songs composed and written by Jukka Kuoppamäki, as well as two compositions by Katri Helena herself.

== Track listing ==
No.	Title	(English meaning)	(Karelian – Livvi)	(Swedish meaning)	(Russian meaning)	Writer(s)	Arranger	Length
1	"Anna mulle tähtitaivas"	Give Me the Starry Sky	Анна минулле тяхтитайвас	Ge mig stjärnhimlen	Дай мне звёздное небо	Jukka Kuoppamäki	Esa Nieminen	3:12
2	"Kukat kellojaan soittaa"	Flowers Ring Their Bells	Цветат соиттах хейлызет биеллат	Blommorna ringer sina klockor	Цветат соиттах хейлызет биеллат	Jori Nummelin	Esa Nieminen	3:43
3	"Sydäntango"	Heart Tango	Сювянь танго	Hjärtats tango	Танго сердца	Jukka Kuoppamäki	Esa Nieminen	2:55
4	"Valkolintu lennä"	White Bird, Fly	Валкеа линду, летта	Vit fågel, flyg	Белая птица, лети	Jukka Kuoppamäki	Esa Nieminen	3:39
5	"Vain unta onko hän?"	Is She Only a Dream?	Онко хян вайни уни?	Är hon bara en dröm?	Она лишь сон?	François Feldman, Jean-Marie Moreau; Finnish lyrics: Jori Nummelin	Esa Nieminen	3:46
6	"Me teimme sen"	We Did It	Мё тиемме сэн	Vi gjorde det	Мы сделали это	Juha Vainio	Veikko Samuli	3:21
7	"Sua rakastan"	I Love You	Мянь раккостан суа	Jag älskar dig	Я люблю тебя	Jukka Kuoppamäki	Esa Nieminen	2:59
8	"Kohtaaminen"	Encounter	Кохтамиже	Möte	Встреча	Jukka Kuoppamäki	Esa Nieminen	3:40
9	"Älä elämää pelkää"	Do Not Fear Life	Эй пяля элямя	Var inte rädd för livet	Не бойся жизни	Elina Kalenius	Esa Nieminen	2:32
10	"Kun rakastetaan"	When Love Is Shared	Кун раккостетаан	När man älskar	Когда любят	Katri Helena Kalaoja; lyrics by Toini Karivalo	Jari Puhakka	3:06
11	"Sinistä silkkiä"	Blue Silk	Синистэ силккя	Blått siden	Синий шёлк	Katri Helena Kalaoja; lyrics by Elina Kalenius	Esa Nieminen	2:36
12	"Saaret"	Islands	Суарет	Öar	Острова	Leena-Kristiina Ronimus; lyrics by Turkka Mali	Esa Nieminen	4:09
