= Piccola strenna =

EP by Mina
- Released: 30 November 2010
- Studio: Studi PDU, Lugano
- Genre: Pop; Christmas
- Length: 11:44
- Label: PDU
- Producer: Massimiliano Pani

Mina chronology
Caramella (2010)	Piccola strenna (2010)	Je suis Mina (2011)

Piccola strenna is an EP by the Italian singer Mina, released on 30 November 2010 by PDU. The album contains four songs recorded for the soundtrack of the film The Santa Claus Gang by Aldo, Giovanni & Giacomo.

== Overview ==
Piccola strenna opens with the track "Mele Kalikimaka", a song Christmas joyful and cheerful, sung partly in English and partly in the Hawaiian language. "Walking the Town" is rather a song-style English rock that adheres perfectly to the setting of a particular scene in the movie, as well as "Il sogno di Giacomo" whose notes underline the recurring nightmare of one of the protagonists, referring to the atmosphere of classic soundtracks, with the voice of Mina that accompanies the music with vocals thrill. Finally, the best-known Christmas songs, "Silent Night" is proposed in an exciting and evocative key jazz ballad.

== Track listing ==
No.	Title	Writer(s)	Length
1.	"Mele Kalikimaka"	Robert Alex Anderson	3:07
2.	"Walking the Town"	Samuele Cerri; Franco Serafini	3:42
3.	"Il sogno di Giacomo"	Massimiliano Pani; Franco Serafini	1:38
4.	"Silent Night"	John Freeman Young; Franz Gruber	3:17
Total length:			11:44
