= Plurale =

Studio album by Mina
- Released: October 1976
- Recorded: 1976
- Studio: La Basilica, Milan
- Genre: Pop; jazz
- Length: 34:56
- Language: Italian; English; Piedmontese; Spanish; French
- Label: PDU

Mina chronology
Singolare (1976)	Plurale (1976)	Del mio meglio n. 4 (1977)

Plurale is a studio album by Italian singer Mina, released in October 1976 by PDU and distributed by EMI Italiana. It was originally distributed as a double album with Singolare.

== Overview ==
The peculiarity of the album is that it was entirely recorded with the technique of the subsequent overdubbing of a single voice of Mina, which with its three octaves of extension gave the possibility of creating vocal formations ranging from the trio to the sixteen-voice choir. The album became Mina's most expensive record at that time, but above all, it was also one of the very first albums that made the most of the overdubbing technique and emphasized the human voice as an instrument. This album is contrasted with Singolare, where only one voice of Mina is heard.

In 1977 the album won first prize at the XV Italian Music Critics Awards. On 29 December 2021 an episode of the TV program 33 Giri – Italian Masters was shown, which was entirely dedicated to the album Plurale.

== Track listing ==
Side A
No.	Title	Writer(s)	Length
1.	"Intro"	Mina	2:25
2.	"Moonlight Serenade"	Glenn Miller; Mitchell Parish	3:53
3.	"C'è un uomo in mezzo al mare"	Nino Giuseppe Rastelli; Dino Olivieri	2:26
4.	"My Love"	Paul McCartney; Linda McCartney	4:12
5.	"Il testamento del capitano"	Gianni Ferrio	3:42
Total length:			16:38

Side B
No.	Title	Writer(s)	Length
1.	"El Porompompero"	José Antonio Ochaíta; Xandro Valerio; Juan Solano Pedrero	3:11
2.	"Michelle"	John Lennon; P. McCartney	5:30
3.	"Pennsylvania 6-5000"	Carl Sigman; Jerry Gray	2:52
4.	"Scettico Blues"	Dino Rulli; T. De Filippis	3:25
5.	"Mood Indigo"	Duke Ellington; Barney Bigard; Irving Mills	3:12
6.	"Good Evening Friends"	Ferrio	0:08
Total length:			18:18

== Personnel ==
- Mina – vocals
- Gianni Ferrio – arrangement, conducting
- Alba Ferrio – producer assistant
- Nuccio Rinaldis – sound engineer
- Luciano Tallarini – cover art
- Mauro Balletti – photography

Credits are adapted from the album's liner notes.

== Charts ==
Chart performance for Plurale and Singolare
Chart (1976–1977)	Peak position
Italian Albums (Billboard)	2
Italian Albums (Musica e dischi)	1

Chart performance for Plurale
Chart (1977)	Peak position
Italian Albums (Musica e dischi)	12
