= Playpen =

Portable enclosure in which young children may safely play

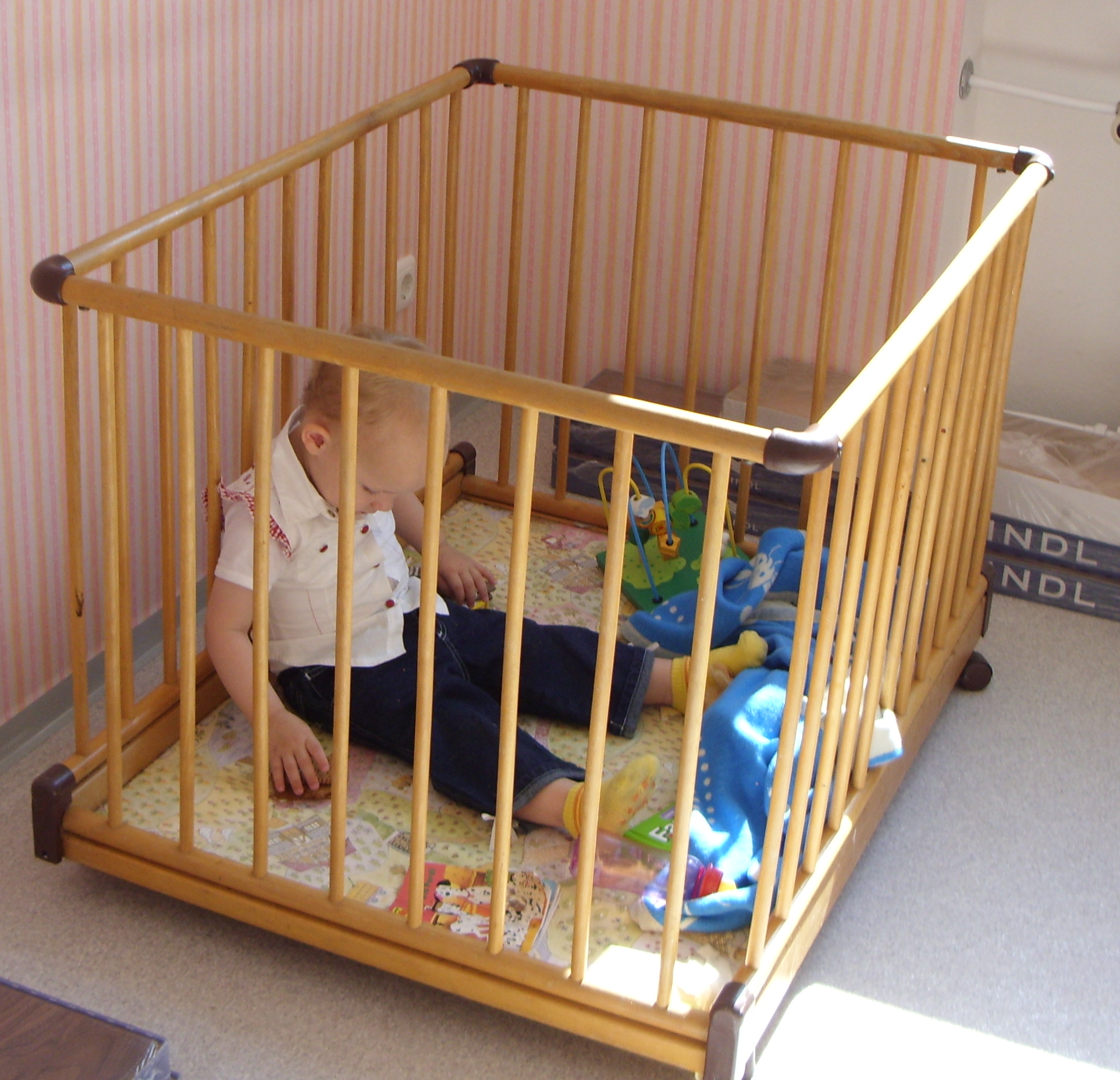
Traditional wooden playpen

A playpen or playard is a piece of furniture used to contain an infant or young toddler in specific area to prevent the child from being harmed while unsupervised.

== History ==
The earliest use of the word playpen was cited in the Oxford English Dictionary in 1902. Little is known about these early playpens, which may have also been referred to as walking frames. Playpens that mimic modern designs existed by the 1920s and were sold to upper-class families that had a nursery. This design may have been influenced by a lack of domestic servants available for hire at the time.

Playpens were traditionally made of wood, and consisted of a flat rectangular platform, usually square in shape, with vertical bars on four sides, so that the child can see out. The floor of the playpen is usually a soft mat. The walls of the playpen are usually higher than the height of the child, so as to avoid climbing injuries; playpens may also have a detachable lid.

Modern playpens are portable and typically consist of a basic metal and plastic support system and mesh, soft plastic or nylon sides. An optional removable bassinet can be attached at the top for the child to sleep in or be changed in until four months of age. Some models have attachments such as mobiles, side pockets for supplies and toys, change table attachment, night lights, music boxes, and clip-on adapter for CD player for the child to listen to music while sleeping or playing. Portable playpens can be collapsed into a small roll for easy storage and transport.

Parenting debates exist on whether or not to use a playpen. There is limited research on playpens since it is not considered to be a parenting choice that has a significant impact on child development. Use of a playpen can improve gross motor skill in preterm infants.

== Safety and regulation ==
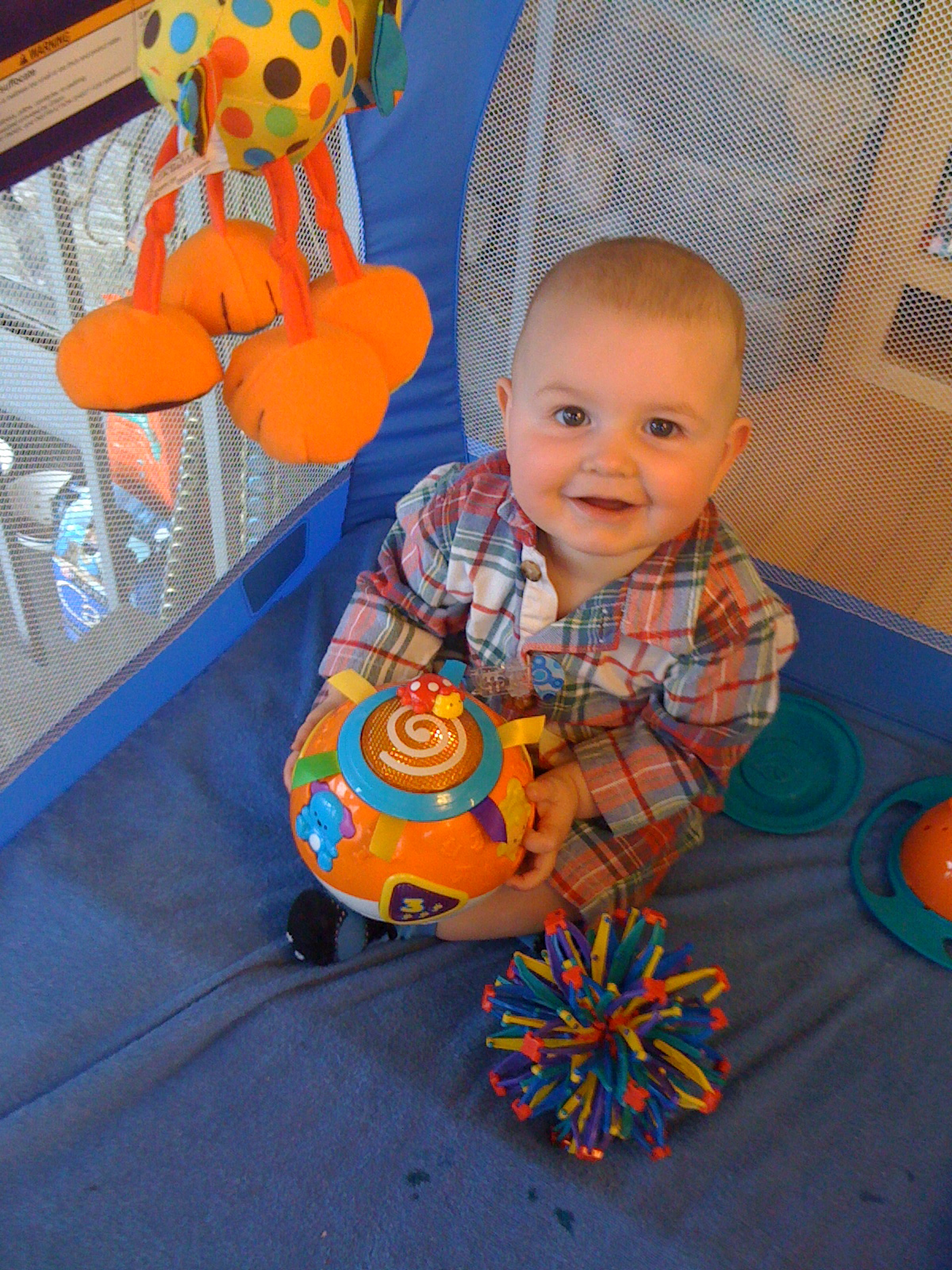
Child in modern playpen

Most injuries related to playpens involve children climbing out and falling. A high side rail height can prevent this outcome. The Consumer Product Safety Commission has recorded at least 52 deaths involving playpens, most of which were caused by positional asphyxia. Pillows and blankets placed in a playpen increase the risk of suffocation. Another safety risk is entrapment through wedging, clothes getting stuck, or parts falling on top of the child.

For playpens, the European Norm EN 12227 is a standard that sets requirements for testing whether clothes or fingers can get caught or crushed. In addition there are stability requirements to ensure that the gate will not give in to pressure, and this is tested with heavy weights to see if the gate easily collapses or falls over.

Some products have a flexible configuration such that they can be configured either as playpens, safety gates or room dividers. For safety gates and pet gates, EN 1930 is a standard for indoor use. In addition, the EN 71 standard sets requirements for the materials it is made of, and these must be free of harmful substances so that it is safe for the child to suck on it. Amongst other things, it is tested to see whether children can get their head, hip or leg through the safety gate or otherwise get stuck or pinched, or whether objects can get stuck in such a way that they pose a choking risk. It is also tested that the gate can withstand children running into it with full force without the gate moving.

== See also ==
- Baby gate
