= Mina quasi Jannacci =

Studio album by Mina
- Released: November 1977
- Recorded: 24 October 1977
- Studio: La Basilica, Milan
- Genre: Canzone italiana
- Length: 37:25
- Language: Italian
- Label: PDU

Mina chronology
| Mina con bignè (1977) | Mina quasi Jannacci (1977) | Mina Live '78 (1978) |

Mina quasi Jannacci is the thirty-second studio album by Italian singer Mina, released in November 1977 by PDU and distributed by EMI Italiana. It was originally distributed as a double LP with Mina con bignè.

== Overview ==
The album contains ten songs originally written by Enzo Jannacci, who duets with Mina on this album. All ten songs were reinterpreted and special arrangements for the orchestra was written by Gianni Ferrio. The songs have mostly already been performed by the author, with the exception of two previously unpublished ones:

- "Vita vita" was used in the same year for the soundtrack to the Mauro Bolognini film Great boiled: This is the main theme of the film and is present in both the opening and ending credits. It has never been performed by Jannacci.
- "Ecco tutto qui" – the music from the song has already been used by the author in the song "Dagalterun fandango" (from O vivere o ridere, 1976); this version will also be recorded by Janacci for the 1979 album Foto ricordo.

There are no other songs by Enzo Jannacci in Mina's discography, except for these ten.

== Critical reception ==
Claudio Milano from OndaRock in a retrospective review stated that these are the most beautiful songs from the author's collection of Enzo Jannacci, who, having thrown off the mask of a buffoon, reveals himself in all the weaknesses and in the greatness of the narrator of human despair, the transmission of the spirit of the time. Milano also noted Mina's perfect, heavenly performance, albeit in a dramatic way, and also that the arrangements seem perfect. Summarizing, he wrote: "A record bordering on perfection, a milestone that caresses genres, surpassing them, a treasure box that needs to be opened with care, a diary abandoned in the attic, the story of Italy in life, which is present every day, but which, unfortunately, no longer exists in music." Italian journalist Aldo Dalla Vecchia, in his book Mina for Beginners, noted that this is a sophisticated tribute, which is one of her least understood, but most unusual and charming entries. Claudio Zonta of La Civiltà Cattolica wrote that Mina performed the material with all her naturalness and class.

== Track listing ==
All tracks are written by Enzo Jannacci, except were noted.

Side A
| No. | Title | Writer(s) | Length |
|---|---|---|---|
| 1. | "Rino" | | 2:17 |
| 2. | "E l'era tardi" | | 3:33 |
| 3. | "Saxophone" | Jannacci; Beppe Viola | 3:22 |
| 4. | "Vincenzina e la fabbrica" | | 3:53 |
| 5. | "Tira a campà" | Jannacci; Viola; Lina Wertmüller | 5:37 |

Side B
| No. | Title | Writer(s) | Length |
|---|---|---|---|
| 1. | "La sera che partì mio padre" | | 4:26 |
| 2. | "Vita vita" | Jannacci; Viola | 3:46 |
| 3. | "E savè" | | 4:35 |
| 4. | "Sfiorisci bel fiore" | | 4:00 |
| 5. | "Ecco tutto qui" | | 3:56 |

== Personnel ==
- Mina – vocals
- Enzo Jannacci – vocals (A2)
- Gianni Ferrio – arrangement, conductor
- Nuccio Rinaldis – mixing, recording
- Alba Ferrio – mixing
- Mauro Balletti – photography
- Luciano Tallarini – art direction

Credits are adapted from the album's liner notes.

== Charts ==
Chart performance for Mina quasi Jannacci and Mina con bignè
| Chart (1977–1978) | Peak position |
|---|---|
| Italian Albums (Billboard) | 5 |
| Italian Albums (Musica e dischi) | 4 |
