= Mina® =

Mina^{®}

Studio album by Mina
- Released: October 1974
- Recorded: 1974
- Studio: La Basilica, Milan
- Genre: Pop
- Length: 42:16
- Language: Italian
- Label: PDU

Mina chronology
Evergreens (1974)	Mina^{®} (1974)	Baby Gate (1974)

Mina^{®} is a studio album by Italian singer Mina, released in 1974 by PDU and distributed by EMI Italiana. Originally distributed as a double album along with Baby Gate. The album topped the Italian albums chart.

== Cover versions ==
Some of the songs of this album were recorded in different languages by Mina during the 1970s. In 1975, she recorded "Due o forse tre", "Nuur" and "Distanze" in Spanish ("Dos o acaso tres", "Nuur", " Dostancias"), as well "Tutto passerà vedrai" ("Todo pasara veras"). The same first three songs were covered in French one year later (as "Deux peut-être trois", "Lumière", "Ensemble"), as well "Caravel" ("La chiromancienne") and "Solo lui" ("Rien que vous"). All the tracks were published on albums for French and Spanish-speaking countries only and were re-issued on cd by EMI in 2011 (in the compilations Je suis Mina and Yo soy Mina).

== Critical reception ==
Mattia Marzi from Rockol noted that this album stated Mina as one of the most valuable voices of Italian pop music.

== Track listing ==
Side A
No.	Title	Writer(s)	Length
1.	"Due o forse tre"	Andrea Lo Vecchio; Shel Shapiro	4:12
2.	"Tutto passerà vedrai"	Lo Vecchio; Shapiro	3:50
3.	"Caravel"	Guido Bolzoni	3:00
4.	"Una musica va"	Mario Nobile; Guido Bolzoni	3:28
5.	"L'amore è un'altra cosa"	Lo Vecchio; Giuseppe Prestipino	2:34
6.	"Penombra"	Giorgio Calabrese; Gianni Ferrio	3:53
Total length:			20:57

Side B
No.	Title	Writer(s)	Length
1.	"Nuur"	Osvaldo Miccike; Ermanno Capelli	4:28
2.	"Distanze"	Luigi Albertelli; Roberto Soffici	4:39
3.	"Mai prima"	Fabio Massimo Cantini; Franca Evangelisti	4:09
4.	"Solo lui"	Cantini; Evangelisti	4:26
5.	"Trasparenze"	Calabrese; Ferrio	3:46
Total length:			21:19

== Personnel ==
- Mina – vocals
- Pino Presti – arrangement (A1, A2, A4, A5, B1, B2)
- Vincenzo Tempera – arrangement (A3)
- Gianni Ferrio – arrangement (A6, B5)
- Toto Torquati – arrangement (B3, B4)
- Nuccio Rinaldis – sound engineer
- Gianni Ronco – illustrations
- Luciano Tallarini – cover art

Credits are adapted from the album's liner notes.

== Charts ==
Chart performance for Mina^{®} and Baby Gate
Chart (1975)	Peak position
Italian Albums (Billboard)	2
Italian Albums (Musica e dischi)	1
