= Baby Gate (album) =

Studio album by Mina
- Released: October 1974
- Recorded: 1974
- Studio: La Basilica, Milan
- Genre: Pop; rock and roll; jazz
- Length: 34:24
- Language: English; Italian
- Label: PDU

Mina chronology
Mina^{®} (1974)	Baby Gate (1974)	Del mio meglio n. 3 (1975)

Baby Gate is a studio album by Italian singer Mina, released in October 1974 by PDU and distributed by EMI Italiana. It was originally released as a double album along with Mina^{®}.

== Overview ==
The name of the album comes from the pseudonym used by the singer at the beginning of her career. As Mina, she recorded songs in Italian; as Baby Gate, she recorded songs only in English for foreign releases. The idea was to try to figure out which of the two images and two different forms of expression would be more successful. The pseudonym Baby Gate existed for a relatively short time (from December 1958 to June 1959). The album is recorded in English and is filled with cover versions of popular songs from the 1950s.

== Track listing ==
Side A
No.	Title	Writer(s)	Length
1.	"Bird Dog"	Boudleaux Bryant; Felice Bryant	2:26
2.	"Mr. Blue"	DeWayne Blackwell	2:39
3.	"I Only Have Eyes for You"	Harry Warren; Al Dubin	3:13
4.	"That's When Your Heartaches Begin"	Fred Fisher; William J. Raskin; Billy Hill	3:40
5.	"Amorevole"	Vittorio Buffoli; Vito Pallavicini; Pino Massara	5:20

Side B
No.	Title	Writer(s)	Length
1.	"Don't"	Jerry Leiber; Mike Stoller	3:00
2.	"Flamingo"	Edmund Anderson; Ted Grouya	3:04
3.	"It's Only Make Believe"	Conway Twitty; Jack Nance	2:20
4.	"I'm in the Mood for Love"	Dorothy Fields; Jimmy McHugh	3:00
5.	"To Be Loved"	Berry Gordy; Tyran Carlo	2:22
6.	"Non so"	Umberto Bindi; Giorgio Calabrese	3:20

== Personnel ==
- Mina – vocals
- Pino Presti – arrangement
- Nuccio Rinaldis – sound engineer
- Gianni Ronco – illustrations
- Luciano Tallarini – cover art

== Charts ==
Chart performance for Baby Gate and Mina^{®}
Chart (1975)	Peak position
Italian Albums (Billboard)	2
Italian Albums (Musica e dischi)	1
