= Vorrei che fosse amore =

Single by Mina

from the album Canzonissima '68
- Language: Italian
- B-side: "Caro"
- Released: October 1968
- Recorded: 2 October 1968
- Genre: Pop
- Length: 2:26
- Label: PDU
- Composer: Bruno Canfora
- Lyricist: Antonio Amurri

Mina singles chronology
"Quand'ero piccola" (1968)	"Vorrei che fosse amore" (1968)	"Nè come nè perchè" (1968)

"Vorrei che fosse amore" (English: "I wish it was love") is a song written by Antonio Amurri and Bruno Canfora. Italian singer Mina recorded it in 1968 as the final theme of the musical TV show Canzonissima. The song was later included on her album Canzonissima '68, and was also released as a single, reaching number 9 on the Italian chart. According to Cash Box magazine, it was ranked 77th on the list of the best-selling singles in Italy between July 1968 and July 1969.

The following year, the song was re-recorded by Mina in French under the title "Si..." and released as a single. To promote this publication, at the end of April 1969, the singer went to Paris, where she performed the song on local television. Mina also recorded an English version called "More Than Strangers", which was released as a single and later included on the album of the same name distributed in the USA.

== Track listing ==
7" single (Italy)
A. "Vorrei che fosse amore" (Antonio Amurri, Bruno Canfora) – 2:26
B. "Caro" (Mina, Maurizio Seymandi, Augusto Martelli) – 3:16

7" single (France)
A. "Si... (Vorrei che fosse amore)" (Amurri, Canfora, Eddy Marnay) – 2:24
B. "Moi je te regarde (Io innamorata)" (Martelli, Giorgio Calabrese, Marnay) – 3:01

7" single (USA)
A. "More Than Strangers (Vorrei che fosse amore)" (Amurri, Canfora, Gladys Shelley, Jimmy Nebb) – 2:17
B. "I Want to Be Loved" (Savannah Churchill) – 2:20

== Charts ==
Chart performance for "Vorrei che fosse amore"
Chart (1968)	Peak position
Italy (Musica e dischi)	9
