= Katri Helena =

Finnish singer (born 1945)

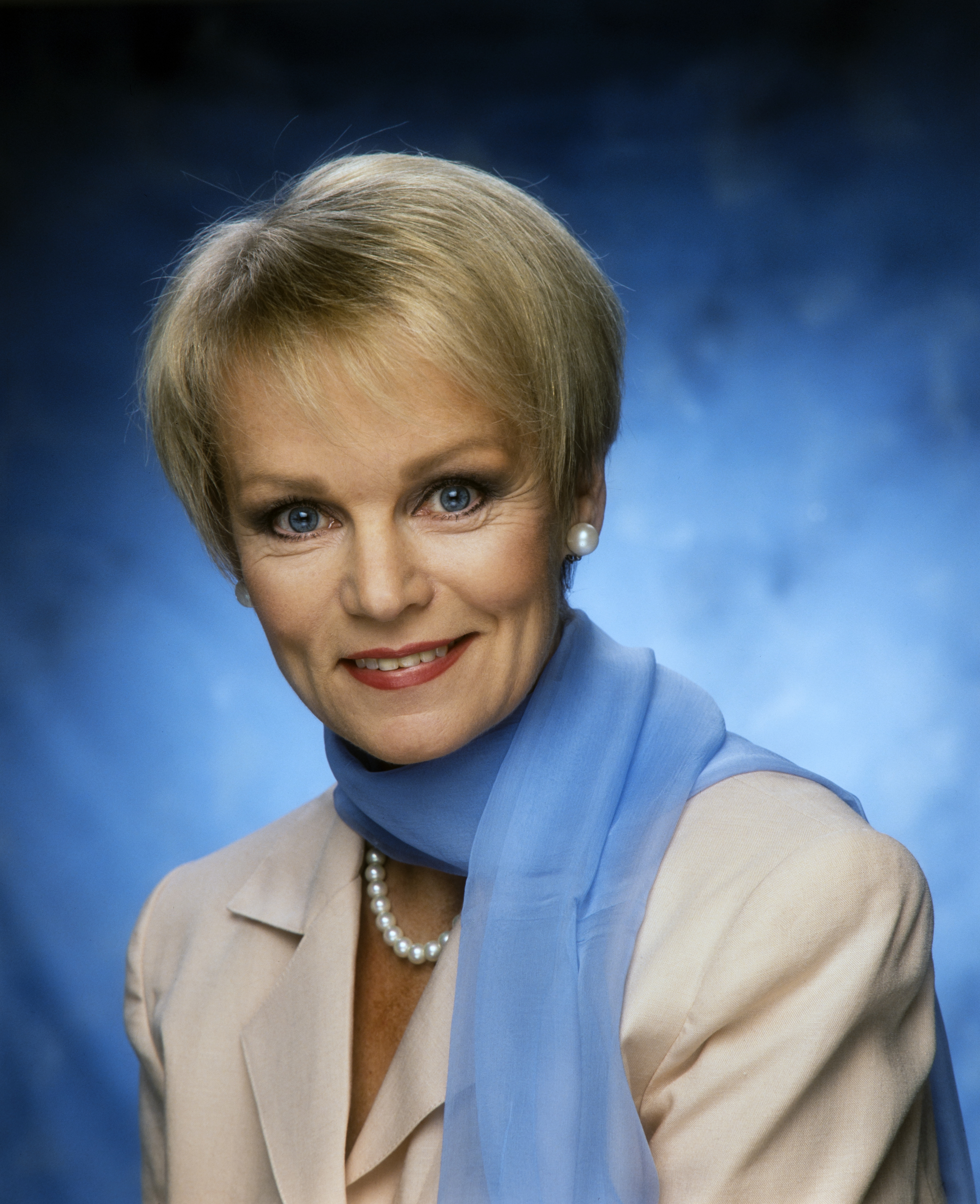
- Katri Helena in 1993

Background information
- Born: Katri Helena Koistinen; 17 August 1945 (age 80); Tohmajärvi, Finland
- Occupation: Singer
- Instrument: Vocals
- Years active: 1963–2025

Katri Helena Kalaoja (née Koistinen; born 17 August 1945) is a retired Finnish singer.

== Career ==
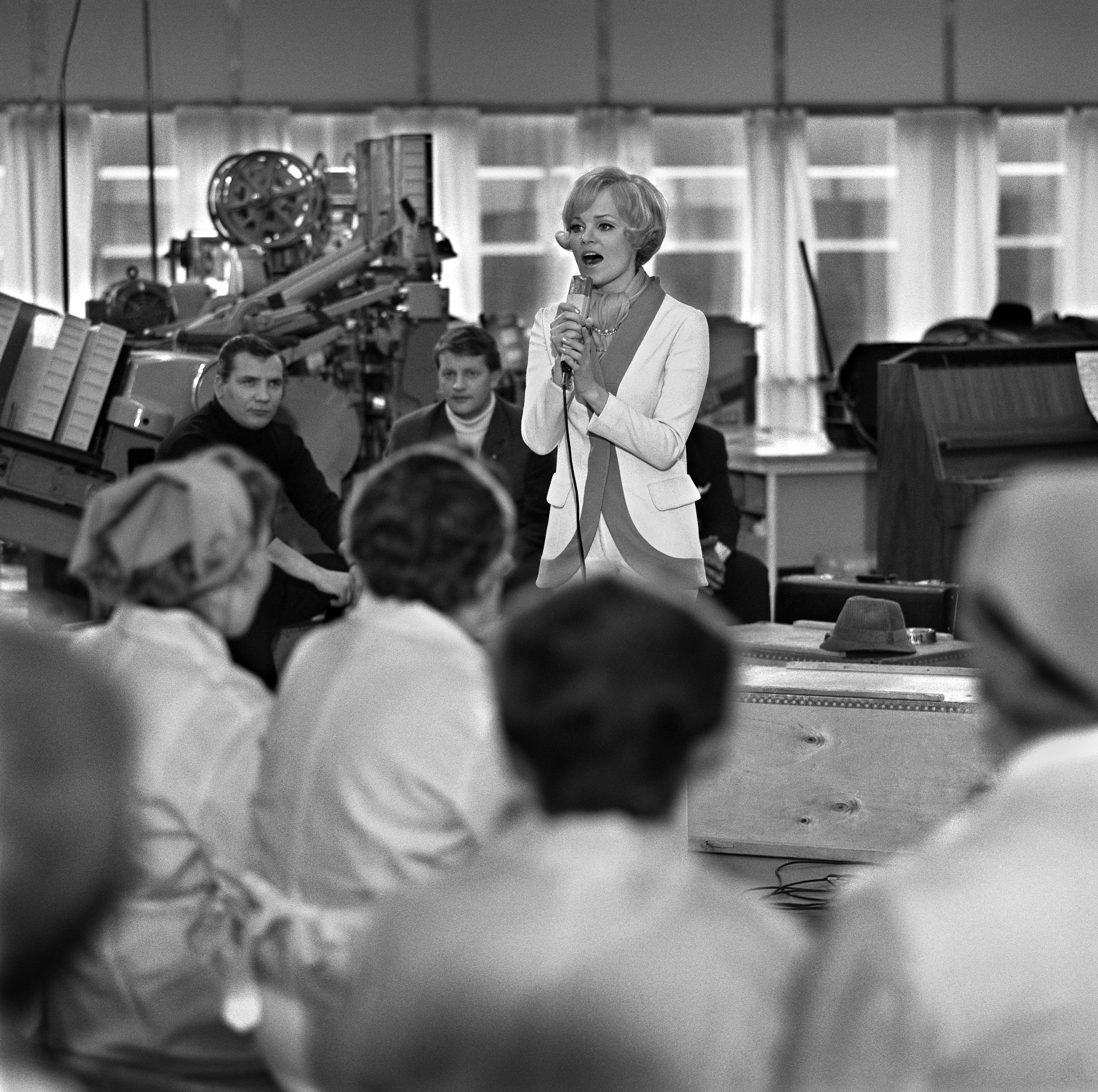
Katri Helena performing for the workers at Rettig Tobacco Factory in Turku. In the background are Eino Grön and Matti Heinivaho in 1968

Katri Helena released her first songs in 1963 and has since sold over 630,000 certified records, which makes her the second-best-selling female soloist in Finland behind Madonna and places her also among the top 20 best-selling music artists in the Finnish market. She has represented Finland twice in the Eurovision Song Contest: in 1979 with her song "Katson sineen taivaan" and in 1993 with "Tule luo". She also took part in the Sopot International Song Festival in Poland in 1969, singing "Valssi".

== Personal life ==
Katri Helena has been married three times. She had two daughters and a son with her husband Timo Kalaoja, who died of a heart attack in 1988. His death affected her so much that she withdrew from public view and stopped performing and recording for four years. Her only son, Juha Kalaoja, died at age 33 of a stroke on 29 April 2009.

== Discography ==
=== Albums ===
- Vaalea valloittaja (1964)
- Puhelinlangat laulaa (1964)
- Katri Helena (1966)
- Katupoikien laulu (1967)
- Paikka auringossa (1968)
- Ei kauniimpaa (1969)
- Kai laulaa saan (1971)
- Lauluja meille kaikille (1972)
- Kakarakestit (1973)
- Kun kohdattiin (1973)
- Paloma blanca (1975)
- Lady Love (1976)
- Ystävä (1978)
- Katson sineen taivaan (1979)
- Sydämeni tänne jää (1980)
- Kotimaa (1981)
- Minä soitan sulle illalla (1982)
- Kirje sulle (1984)
- On elämä laulu (1986)
- Almaz (1988)
- Juhlakonsertti (1989)
- Anna mulle tähtitaivas (1992)
- Lähemmäksi (1993)
- Vie minut (1995)
- Hiljaisuudessa (1996)
- Missä oot (1998)
- Leidit levyllä (2000)
- Tässä tällä hetkellä (2004)
- Elämänlangat (2006)
- Hiljaisuudessa (2006)
- Tulet aina olemaan (2009)
- Valon maa (2011)
- Sinivalkoinen (2012)
- Taivaan tie (2014)
- Niin on aina ollut (2015)

=== Singles ===
- "Vasten auringon siltaa" (1974)
- "Katson sineen taivaan" (1979)
- "Tule luo" (1993)
- "Vierellesi kaipaan" (with Jari Sillanpää; 2007)
- "Taivaan tie" (2014)

== See also ==
- List of best-selling music artists in Finland

Preceded by Seija Simola with Anna rakkaudelle tilaisuus	Finland in the Eurovision Song Contest; 1979	Succeeded by Vesa-Matti Loiri with Huilumies

Preceded by Pave Maijanen with Yamma, yamma	Finland in the Eurovision Song Contest; 1993	Succeeded by CatCat with Bye Bye Baby
