= Minacantalucio =

Studio album by Mina
- Released: October 1975
- Recorded: 9 October 1975
- Studio: La Basilica, Milan
- Genre: Pop
- Length: 39:04
- Language: Italian
- Label: PDU

Mina chronology
| Del mio meglio n. 3 (1975) | Minacantalucio (1975) | La Mina (1975) |

Minacantalucio (also referred as Mina Canta Lucio) is a studio album by Italian singer Mina, released in October 1975 by PDU and distributed by EMI Italiana.

== Overview ==
The title translates as Mina Sings Lucio, referring to the album's consisting entirely of songs composed by Lucio Battisti (and originally recorded by him except for "L'aquila", originally performed by Bruno Lauzi). The album was also released as a double LP along with La Mina, and a large poster of Mina, painted by Piero Crida and inspired by Maxfield Parrish's work, was used as packaging.

== Critical reception ==
Claudio Milano from OndaRock praised the album, especially its complex, avant-garde and very individual arrangements, associated with a voice that refuses all condescension. He also stated that this album is a "pearl" and the best tribute to Battisti.

== Track listing ==
All lyrics are written by Mogol; all music is composed by Lucio Battisti.

Side A
| No. | Title | Length |
|---|---|---|
| 1. | "I giardini di marzo" | 6:04 |
| 2. | "Il nostro caro angelo" | 4:08 |
| 3. | "Dieci ragazzi (Dieci ragazze)" | 2:36 |
| 4. | "Innocenti evasioni" | 3:24 |
| 5. | "7 e 40" | 3:35 |
| Total length: | | 19:47 |

Side B
| No. | Title | Length |
|---|---|---|
| 1. | "Emozioni" | 4:35 |
| 2. | "Fiori rosa, fiori di pesco" | 3:04 |
| 3. | "29 settembre" | 3:34 |
| 4. | "L'aquila" | 4:30 |
| 5. | "Non è Francesca" | 3:34 |
| Total length: | | 19:17 |

== Personnel ==
- Mina – vocals
- Gabriel Yared – arrangement
- Nuccio Rinaldis – sound engineer
- Mauro Balletti – photography
- Luciano Tallarini – cover art

Credits are adapted from the album's liner notes.

== Charts ==
=== Weekly charts ===
Weekly chart performance for Minacantalucio and La Mina
| Chart (1976) | Peak position |
|---|---|
| Italian Albums (Musica e dischi) | 3 |

Weekly chart performance for Minacantalucio
| Chart (1976) | Peak position |
|---|---|
| Italian Albums (Billboard) | 3 |
| Italian Albums (Musica e dischi) | 3 |

=== Year-end charts ===
Year-end chart performance for Minacantalucio and La Mina
| Chart (1976) | Position |
|---|---|
| Italian Albums (Musica e dischi) | 5 |
