= Carlos Eduardo Imperial =

Brazilian actor, filmmaker, television presenter, songwriter and music producer

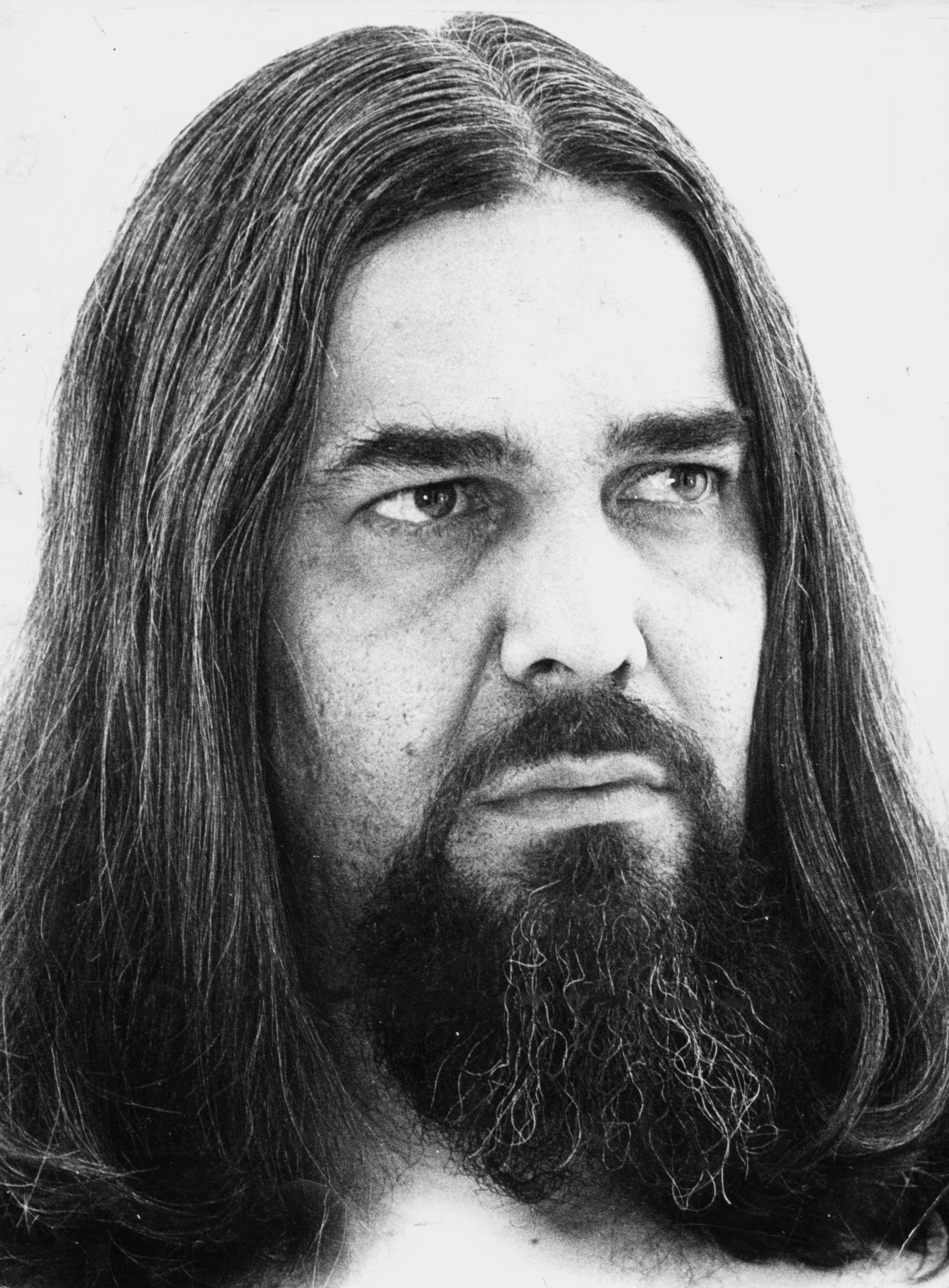
Imperial in 1971

Carlos Eduardo da Corte Imperial (Brazilian Portuguese: [ˈkaʁluz eduˈaʁdu dɐ ˈkoʁtʃi ĩpeɾiˈaw]; November 24, 1935 – November 4, 1992) was a Brazilian actor, filmmaker, television presenter, songwriter and music producer from Rio de Janeiro.

== Early life and education ==
Carlos Eduardo da Corte Imperial was born on November 24, 1935, in Cachoeiro de Itapemirim, Espírito Santo, Brazil.

== Career ==
In the early 1970s, Imperial became a controversial judge on a talent show presented by Chacrinha. At the end of the decade, he presented TV Tupi as an attraction on Saturday nights and was a show that the country watched religiously; it later migrated to TVS - Canal 11 Rio de Janeiro.

Imperial was also a columnist for the magazine Amiga, published by Bloch Publishing from 1969. His column was characterised by its irreverence. At the 1984 Carnival, Imperial became famous for releasing the notes of the jurors in the parades of the samba schools in Rio. Every time a maximum score was awarded he exclaimed loudly "dez, nota dez" ("ten! ten points!"). This sentence appealed to popular taste, gaining him real support. He was elected an alderman of Rio de Janeiro in 1982. He ran for mayor of Rio in 1985, but lost the election.

He later became an author of the well-known 1960s song "A Praça" ("the square"), the Ronnie Von hit that became the opening theme of the humorous television programme A Praça É Nossa ("the square is ours").

Around 1961, at the age of 29, Imperial tried to launch the career of Roberto Carlos as a "prince of bossa nova", producing his first album, Crazy For You. However, his pupil was accused of shamelessly imitating Joao Gilberto, and the album failed. But he continued until he was signed to CBS in 1958 as a producer. At that time he was known as "Dad". Imperial also launched the Career of vários Brazilian superstars such as Elis Regina, Erasmo Carlos, Tim Maia, Wilson Simonal and many others. He was known as the father of Rock’n Roll in Brazil and was fundamental in the music, movie, theater, television and politics. His music and art still expanding in Brazil and it’s showcased in documentaries and biographies of several artists life story.

== Personal life ==
Imperial had a daughter Maria Luiza and a son Marco Antonio from his marriage to Rose Gracie, the daughter of Carlos Gracie from the Gracie Family. Maria Luiza married her second cousin Rorion Gracie and had two daughters that were the love of Imperial’s life as he would always claim named Rose Corte Imperial Gracie (named after her grandmother) and Riane Corte Imperial Gracie. Rose took care of her grandfather for the last few months of his life and moved to the US soon after Imperial's death and has lived there since then. She has three daughters, Stephanie Milius that is also the granddaughter of John Milius, Railey and Raifa that are from her second marriage to Cuban MMA Fighter Javier Vazquez. She resides in California, US.

Riane also moved to the US after living in Europe for a few years and she now lives in Georgia, US and has one daughter named Raianne.

Marco Antonio got involved with the Santo Daime and has become a prominent figure in that religion. He has 13 kids.

== Death ==
Imperial was a victim of the rare disease myasthenia gravis. After an operation to remove his thymus, he died on November 4, 1992, in Rio de Janeiro, at the age of 56.

== Filmography ==
=== TV shows ===
- 1977: Programa Carlos Imperial
- 1979: Show Carlos Imperial

=== Director ===
- 1974: A Building Called 200
- 1975: The Death Squad
- 1976: Sex Dolls
- 1976: The sex fiend
- 1979: Humor, the Golden Butt
- 1981: Delights of Sex
- 1981: A Martian in My Bed
- 1981: Women

=== Actor ===
- 1954: The oil is ours - Bit part
- 1956: Smuggling
- 1957: De Vento em Popa
- 1957: Sherlock Araque - Carlos
- 1957: cowboy up
- 1957: Canjerê
- 1958: My mother and Police
- 1958: And He Do not Bug - Chicão
- 1958: Joy of Life
- 1958: Agüenta o Rojão
- 1959: Women on Vista
- 1959: Walking in the Table
- 1959: Lean Girl
- 1960: Go That Is Soft - Pé de Cabra
- 1961: Women, I came
- 1961: Rio Night
- 1961: The owner of the Ball - Ronaldo
- 1962: Blood at Dawn
- 1964: Asphalt Wild
- 1968: The King of Pilantragem
- 1968: Bebel, Garota Propaganda
- 1969: Time of Violence
- 1971: The Loves of a Tacky
- 1971: The Sweet Sex Sports
- 1972: The Virgin Widow - Coronel Alexandrão
- 1972: Independence or Death - taberneiro
- 1972: Cassy Jones, Magnificent Seducer
- 1973: A building called 200 - Bororó
- 1973: Pica-Pau Amarelo - Capitão Gancho
- 1973: The depraved
- 1974: Sex Dolls
- 1974: Banana Mechanics - Dr. Ferrão
- 1975: The Expletive
- 1975: The Monster Caraíba
- 1975: The Death Squad
- 1976: The Pervert
- 1976: O Palavrão
- 1976: Girls Want ... And the Crown may
- 1976: The island of Virgin Cangaceiros
- 1977: Bad Step
- 1977: Holiday Loving
- 1978: O Gigante da América
- 1978: The Bride of the City
- 1978: Amada Amante - Godoy
- 1980: Delights of Sex
- 1981: Women - Fausto
- 1985: Lost in Dinosaur Valley - China
- 1985: The good times roll: Let's Enjoy It Again - (segment "Sábado Quente")
- 1990: O Escorpião Escarlate
