= Baby gate =

Protective barrier for young children

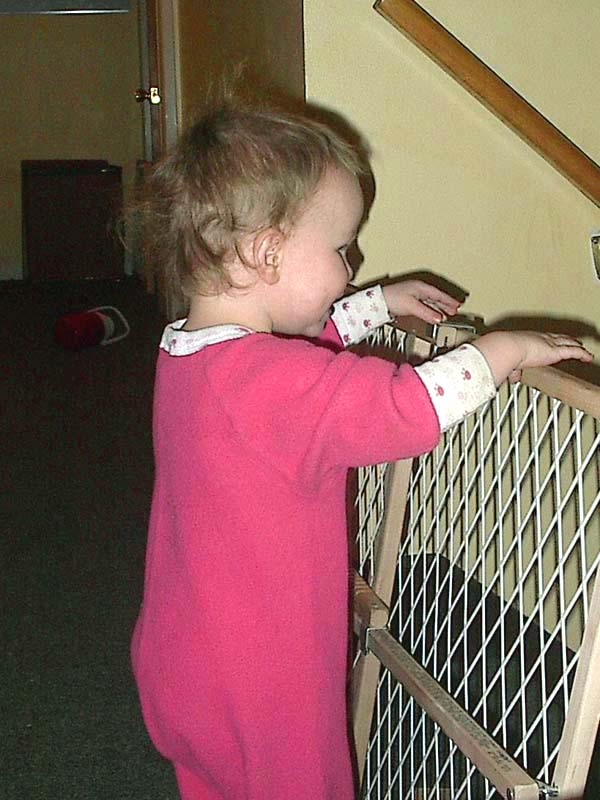
A child peering over a baby gate

A baby gate or stair gate is a protective barrier designed to prevent babies and toddlers from accessing areas of a home that may not be safe for them, such as stairways and kitchens. Baby gates are typically constructed of metal, plastic and/or wood, and can be expanded to fit in a range of doorway widths. They may be designed for use indoors or out, and may be either hardware or pressure-mounted.

Pressure-mounted gates are typically held in place by friction with the walls on either side, while hardware-mounted gates are screwed into the wall studs and swing fully open like a door. There are hardware-mounted gates that can be customized to fit wide and irregularly shaped openings, as well as mesh retractable gates that roll out of the way.

Safety gates are used to help prevent a child from accessing an area of a house, especially the stairway, or to allow an exterior door to be open for ventilation while restricting movement of a child. Pressure gates and hardware mounted gates are available. Pressure gates can be dislodged by children and should not be used at the top of stairs. In some situations, pressure gates at the top of stairs have caused serious injury when a child has run against it or when a parent has fallen trying to step over the gate. Hardware mounted gates are the most secure option and should be installed securely into wall studs. A hearth gate is a safety gate used to prevent access to a wood burning stoves and fireplaces.

Baby gates are typically removed once a child is capable of opening or climbing over the gate.

Baby gates are also frequently used to contain small pets, especially ones that are not housebroken. A pet gate may not meet the voluntary standard for baby gates.

== Standards ==
For safety gates and pet gates, EN 1930 is a standard for indoor use. In addition, the EN 71 standard sets requirements for the materials it is made of, and these must be free of harmful substances so that it is safe for the child to suck on it. Amongst other things, it is tested to see whether children can get their head, hip or leg through the safety gate or otherwise get stuck or pinched, or whether objects can get stuck in such a way that they pose a choking risk. It is also tested that the gate can withstand children running into it with full force without the gate moving.

Some products have a flexible configuration such that they can be configured either as playpens, safety gates or room dividers. For playpens, the European Norm EN 12227 is a standard that sets requirements for testing whether clothes or fingers can get caught or crushed. In addition there are stability requirements to ensure that the gate will not give in to pressure, and this is tested with heavy weights to see if the gate easily collapses or falls over.

== See also ==
- Childproofing
- Child care
- Playpen, furniture a child can play inside without getting into harm
- Playwork
- Babysitting
- Child development
