= Gian Pieretti =

Italian singer-songwriter

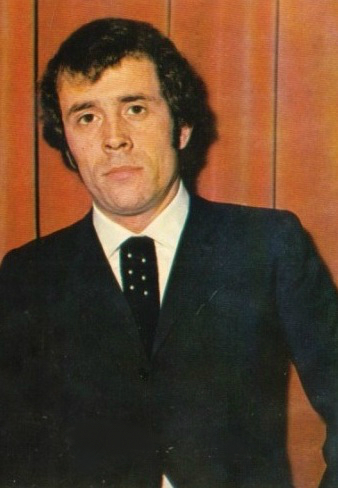
- Born: Dante Luca Pieretti; 12 May 1940 (age 85); Ponte Buggianese, Tuscany, Kingdom of Italy
- Occupation: Singer-songwriter

Dante Luca Pieretti (born 12 May 1940), better known as Gian Pieretti, is an Italian singer-songwriter and composer, mainly successful in the second half of the 1960s.

== Life and career ==
Born in Ponte Buggianese, in 1963 Pieretti released his first single "Perduto Amor" as Perry, before adopting the name Gian Pieretti for his second single "Ciao", released the same year. In 1964, he started performing accompanied by I Grifoni, a band consisting of future Premiata Forneria Marconi members Franco Mussida, Giorgio Piazza and Franz Di Cioccio. In 1966, he had his breakout with "Il vento dell'est", a song co-written with Ricky Gianco and influenced by Donovan's and Bob Dylan's style; the same year, he served as supporting act in a series of happenings held by Jack Kerouac in Rome, Milan and Naples.

In 1967, Gian Pieretti took part in the Sanremo Music Festival with "Pietre", a protest song co-written with Gianco; the song became a massive hit in the more light heart version of Antoine. The same year, he released his first album, Se vuoi un consiglio. In 1969, he got a significant success with "Celeste", lead single of the album Il viaggio celeste di Gian Pieretti. His following works became more politically and socially engaged, touching sensitive themes such as homosexuality and alienation, but failed to achieve positive results in terms of sales, leading to his semi-retirement in 1975. He returned to release a new work in 1989 with Don Chisciotte. In 2019 he released the album Nobel, dedicated to Bob Dylan's repertoire, with 11 songs translated into Italian (including A Hard Rain's a-Gonna Fall, Just Like a Woman and Knockin' on Heaven's Door) and a cover of Woody Guthrie's song Deportee

== Discography ==
Album

- 1967 - Se vuoi un consiglio
- 1969 - Il viaggio celeste di Gian Pieretti
- 1973 - Il vestito rosa del mio amico Piero
- 1975 - Cianfrusaglie
- 1989 - Don Chisciotte
- 1992 - Bang
- 1993 - Il vento dell'Est
- 1997 - Caro Bob Dylan...
- 2011 - Tatanka Yotanka
- 2013 - Cinquant'anni da poeta
- 2019 - Nobel
