= Cristiano Malgioglio =

Italian singer

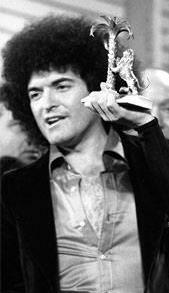
- Malgioglio in 1974
- Born: Giuseppe Cristiano Malgioglio; 23 April 1945 (age 81); Ramacca, Catania, Italy
- Occupations: Singer; songwriter; composer; television personality

Giuseppe Cristiano Malgioglio (pronounced [kriˈstjaːno malˈdʒɔʎʎo]; born 23 April 1945) is an Italian singer, songwriter, and television personality. Over the course of his career, he published thirty studio albums, being appreciated as a songwriter in the 1970s and 1980s. Starting in the 2000s, he also launched a successful television career, in various roles such as commentator, contestant, and host of TV programs, both on Rai and Mediaset.

== Biography ==
Born in Ramacca, Catania, Malgioglio obtained his first contract with a record label, Durium, thanks to the efforts of Fabrizio De André. In 1974 he composed Iva Zanicchi's song "Ciao cara come stai?" ("Hi darling, How Are You?"), which won the Sanremo Music Festival. In 1975 he had his most significant success as songwriter with Mina's "L'importante è finire" ("What Matters Is to finish"). In the same period he became a collaborator of Roberto Carlos, dealing with the Italian lyrics of his songs. He composed songs for, among others, Adriano Celentano, Rita Pavone, Amanda Lear, Raffaella Carrà, Mónica Naranjo, Dori Ghezzi, Milva, Patty Pravo, Ornella Vanoni, Giuni Russo, Marcella Bella, Sylvie Vartan, Umberto Balsamo, Fred Bongusto, Pupo, Rosanna Fratello, Loretta Goggi, Franco Califano. Parallel to his activity as a composer, Malgioglio started a singing career, characterized by ironical songs, often rich in sexual innuendos; his main success as a singer-songwriter is the song "Sbucciami" ("Peel Me").

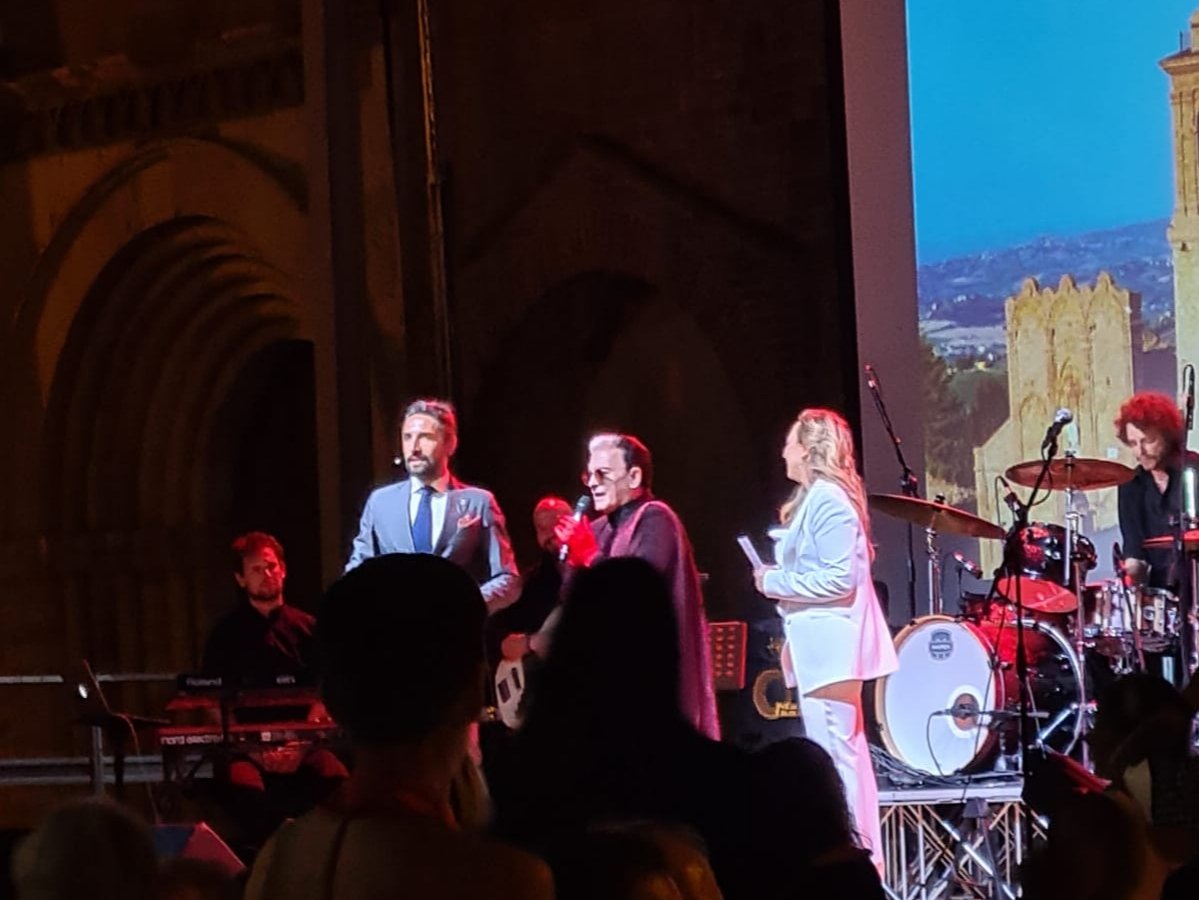
Malgioglio (center) performing in 2022

After a period spent in Latin America, Malgioglio returned to popularity in his country in the 2000s as a television personality. In 2017 and 2020 he competed in the reality television Grande Fratello VIP, the Italian adaptation of Celebrity Big Brother. He was a judge on the programme Tale e quale show. He co-hosted the second night of the Sanremo Music Festival 2025 alongside Bianca Balti, Nino Frassica and Carlo Conti.

== Personal life ==
Cristiano Malgioglio is openly gay; he also considers himself Roman Catholic.
