= Antonio Amurri =

Italian writer (1925–1992)

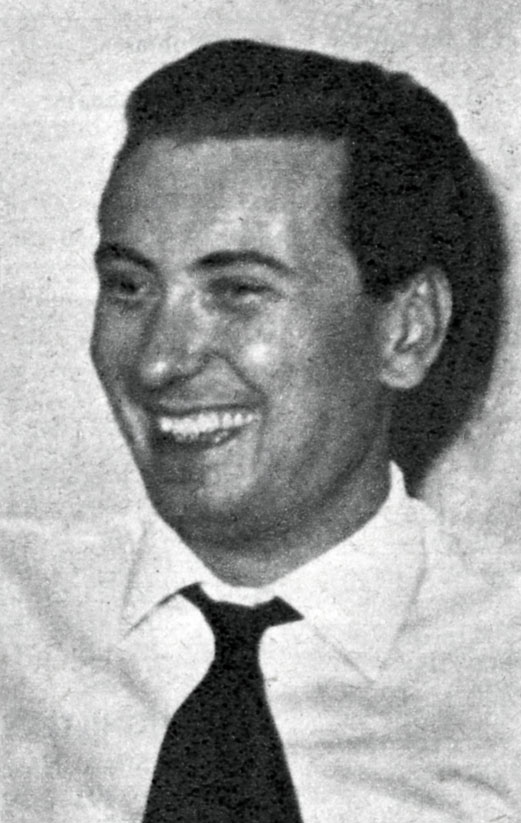
- Born: 28 June 1925; Ancona, Italy
- Died: 18 December 1992 (aged 67); Rome, Italy
- Occupations: Author, writer, lyricist
- Children: 2, including Franco Amurri
- Relatives: Eva Amurri (granddaughter)

Antonio Amurri (28 June 1925 – 18 December 1992) was an Italian author, radio and television writer and lyricist.

Born in Ancona, Amurri was author of some of the most popular RAI variety shows, such as Canzonissima, Gran Varietà, Fantastico and Studio Uno. He was also author of fourteen books, several of them best sellers, which were mainly collections of short stories consisting of satirical portraits of collapsing family groups.

Amurri was the father of the television writer Valentina Amurri and of the film director Franco Amurri; he was also the paternal grandfather of American actress Eva Amurri.
