= Roberto Soffici =

Italian singer-songwriter, composer, and lyricist

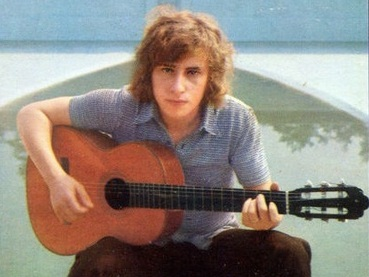
- Born: 29 October 1946 (age 79); Pula, AMG-occupied Istria
- Occupation: singer-songwriter

Roberto Soffici (born 29 October 1946) is an Italian pop singer-songwriter, composer and lyricist.

== Background ==
Born in Pula, the son of composer and conductor Piero, Soffici enrolled at the Giuseppe Verdi Conservatory in Milan, graduating in clarinet, harmony and composition. In the 1970s he started a productive career as a composer, writing songs for Mina, Equipe 84, Nomadi and Ornella Vanoni, among others. From the second half of the seventies he has been also active as a singer-songwriter; his main success was the 1980 song "Io ti voglio tanto bene", which peaked at sixth place at the Italian hit parade.
