= Mina albums discography =

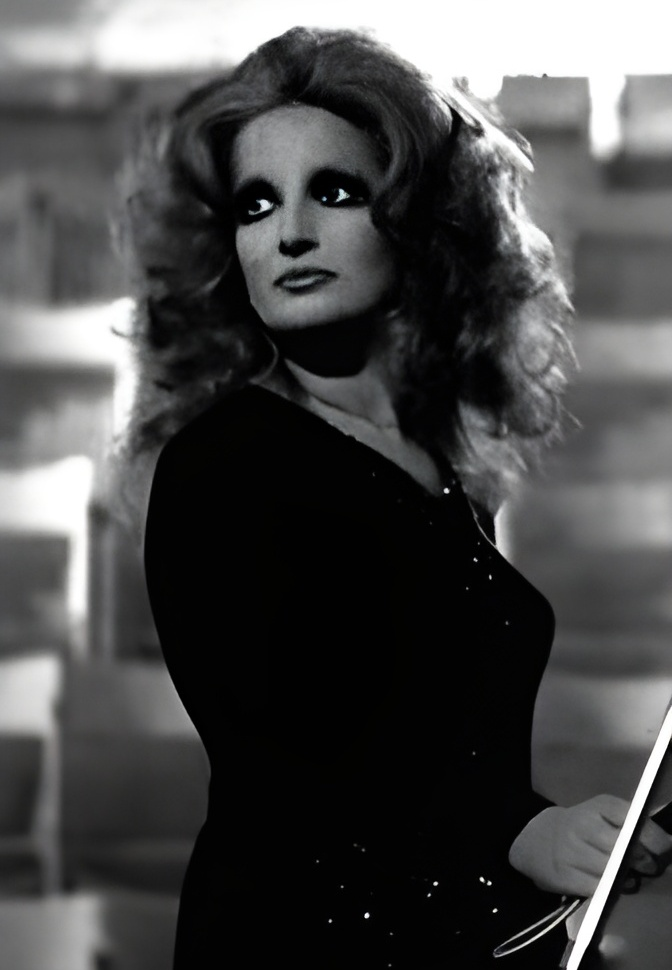
- Mina in 1972
- Studio albums: 76
- Extended plays: 18
- Live albums: 4
- Compilation albums: 49+
- Video albums: 6

Italian singer Mina has released seventy-six studio albums, four live albums, forty-nine official compilation albums, six video albums and eighteen extended plays. During her career, Mina has sold more than 150 million records worldwide, making her one of the best-selling music artists of all time.

Mina made her debut on the music scene in the late 1950s. In 1959, her first recordings were released on the Italdisc label, and in 1960 her debut album Tintarella di luna was composed, which was a great success with the public. In the next three years, the singer released five more albums on the Italdisc label, but in 1963 she left it and switched to Ri-Fi, where her new album Mina was released in 1964. However, Mina stayed there for only a few years, having managed to release several studio albums-soundtracks to the popular TV show Studio Uno, in which she also was a presenter.

In 1967, Mina gained full creative freedom by founding her own label, PDU. In December 1967, the first independent album was released, the English-language album Dedicato a mio padre, dedicated to Mina's father. In May of the following year, Mina was the first Italian artist to release a live album, Mina alla Bussola dal vivo. In 1969, the album ...bugiardo più che mai... più incosciente che mai... was released, which stayed at the top of the national chart for sixteen weeks. It was followed by such bestsellers as ...quando tu mi spiavi in cima a un batticuore..., Mina and Cinquemilaquarantatre, all of them reached the first position and lasted in the Italian chart for more than twenty-five weeks. The 1971 album Mina is also one of the best—selling in the singer's career – more than 900,000 copies sold in Italy alone. In addition, in 1971, the compilation Del mio meglio was released, which spent 45 weeks on the charts including fifteen weeks at number one.

Starting in 1972, the singer began to release double albums, which were also distributed separately. Thus, Altro and Dalla Bussola, Frutta e verdura and Amanti di valore, Mina® and Baby Gate, Minacantalucio and La Mina, Singolare and Plurale, Mina con bignè and Mina quasi Jannacci were released. In 1978, the singer's third and last live album, Mina Live '78, was released. 1978 was the last year when Mina appeared in the public plane, after which the singer went into seclusion and began to communicate with listeners only through music.

In 1979, Mina's next album, Attila, was released, which, although it did not top the chart, but lasted in the top five for eighteen weeks. However, the next studio album, Kyrie, reached only the ninth place, which was at that time the lowest position in the charts of all the studio albums of the singer. One of the most successful releases of the 80s was the studio album Sì, buana and the compilation Oggi ti amo di più, which topped the Italian chart and lasted twenty-one weeks in it. Starting with Finalmente ho conosciuto il conte Dracula... (1986), the singer began releasing her albums on CDs.

In the 1990s, the singer did not slow down the pace of releasing albums. In 1993, for the first time in a long time, two albums were released immediately: the first was a tribute album to the Beatles, Mina canta i Beatles, the second was the studio Lochness, which topped the Italian chart. Since 1996, Mina has stopped releasing double albums. The first such releases were the albums Cremona and Napoli. Together with Adriano Celentano in 1998, the singer released the album Mina Celentano, which was a resounding success in Italy – the record topped the charts for thirteen weeks, and also received twice diamond status in the country.

The singer opened the new millennium with an album of academic music Dalla terra. In 2001, a remastered reissue of fifty-nine Mina albums from the PDU catalog was released. In 2004, The Platinum Collection was released, which lasted 172 weeks in the Italian charts – the best indicator of the singer. In 2005, a new tribute album L'allieva was released, this time to Frank Sinatra. In 2007, Mina released the album Todavía, for which she re-recorded her previous hits in Spanish and Portuguese. In the 2010s, the singer continued to release studio albums, all of them were in the top ten and received music certifications in Italy. In 2016, the Mina—Celentano couple released their second joint album, Le migliori, which also topped the Italian charts and received seven platinum certifications. The singer released her last studio album to date, Gassa d'amante, in 2024.

== Studio albums ==
Title	Album details	Peak chart positions						Sales	Certifications
Title	Album details	ITA	EU	GRE	SPA	SWI	SWI RO	Sales	Certifications
Tintarella di luna	Released: March 1960; Label: Italdisc; Formats: LP	—	—	—	—	—	—		
Il cielo in una stanza	Released: June 1960; Label: Italdisc; Formats: LP	—	—	—	—	—	—		
Due note	Released: 18 September 1961; Label: Italdisc; Formats: LP	—	—	—	—	—	—		
Moliendo café	Released: April 1962; Label: Italdisc; Formats: LP	—	—	—	—	—	—		
Renato	Released: December 1962; Label: Italdisc; Formats: LP	—	—	—	—	—	—		
Stessa spiaggia, stesso mare	Released: 1 October 1963; Label: Italdisc; Formats: LP	—	—	—	—	—	—		
Mina	Released: May 1964; Label: Ri-Fi; Formats: LP	3	—	—	—	—	—		
Studio Uno	Released: March 1965; Label: Ri-Fi; Formats: LP	1	—	—	—	—	—		
Studio Uno 66	Released: July 1966; Label: Ri-Fi; Formats: LP	1	—	—	—	—	—		
Mina 2	Released: November 1966; Label: Ri-Fi; Formats: LP	8	—	—	—	—	—		
Sabato sera – Studio Uno '67	Released: May 1967; Label: Ri-Fi; Formats: LP	1	—	—	—	—	—		
Dedicato a mio padre	Released: December 1967; Label: PDU; Formats: LP, cassette	5	—	—	—	—	—		
Le più belle canzoni italiane interpretate da Mina	Released: 1968; Label: PDU; Formats: LP	65	—	—	—	—	—		
Canzonissima '68	Released: December 1968; Label: PDU; Formats: LP, cassette	2	—	—	—	—	—		
I discorsi	Released: 1969; Label: PDU; Formats: LP, 8-Trk	1	—	—	—	—	—		
Mina for You	Released: July 1969; Label: PDU; Formats: LP	4	—	—	—	—	—		
...bugiardo più che mai... più incosciente che mai...	Released: November 1969; Label: PDU; Formats: LP, cassette	1	—	—	—	—	—		
Mina canta o Brasil	Released: 1970; Label: PDU; Formats: LP	—	—	—	—	—	—		
...quando tu mi spiavi in cima a un batticuore...	Released: November 1970; Label: PDU; Formats: LP, cassette	1	—	—	—	—	—		
Mina	Released: November 1971; Label: PDU; Formats: LP, 8-Trk, cassette	1	—	—	—	—	—	ITA: 900,000	
Cinquemilaquarantatre	Released: 27 May 1972; Label: PDU; Formats: LP, 8-Trk, cassette	1	—	—	—	—	—		
Altro	Released: November 1972; Label: PDU; Formats: LP	2	—	—	—	—	—		
Frutta e verdura	Released: October 1973; Label: PDU; Formats: LP, cassette	1	—	—	—	—	—		
Amanti di valore	Released: October 1973; Label: PDU; Formats: LP, cassette	1	—	—	—	—	—		
Mina^{®}	Released: October 1974; Label: PDU; Formats: LP, cassette	1	—	—	—	—	—		
Baby Gate	Released: October 1974; Label: PDU; Formats: LP, cassette	1	—	—	—	—	—		
Minacantalucio	Released: October 1975; Label: PDU; Formats: LP, 8-Trk, cassette	3	—	—	—	—	—		
La Mina	Released: October 1975; Label: PDU; Formats: LP, 8-Trk, cassette	3	—	—	—	—	—		
Singolare	Released: October 1976; Label: PDU; Formats: LP, cassette	1	—	—	—	—	—		
Plurale	Released: October 1976; Label: PDU; Formats: LP, cassette	1	—	—	—	—	—		
Mina con bignè	Released: October 1977; Label: PDU; Formats: LP, cassette	4	—	—	—	—	—		
Mina quasi Jannacci	Released: October 1977; Label: PDU; Formats: LP, cassette	4	—	—	—	—	—		
Attila	Released: October 1979; Label: PDU; Formats: LP, cassette	2	—	—	—	—	—		
Kyrie	Released: 27 November 1980; Label: PDU; Formats: LP, cassette	9	—	—	—	—	—	ITA: 350,000	
Salomè	Released: November 1981; Label: PDU; Formats: LP, cassette	2	—	—	—	—	—		
Italiana	Released: November 1982; Label: PDU; Formats: LP, cassette	6	—	—	—	—	—		
Mina 25	Released: October 1983; Label: PDU; Formats: LP, cassette	8	—	—	—	—	—	ITA: 400,000	
Catene	Released: November 1984; Label: PDU; Formats: LP, cassette	2	—	—	—	—	—		
Finalmente ho conosciuto il conte Dracula...	Released: October 1985; Label: PDU; Formats: LP, CD, cassette	2	—	—	—	—	—		
Sì, buana	Released: October 1986; Label: PDU; Formats: LP, CD, cassette	1	—	—	—	—	—	ITA: 240,000	
Rane supreme	Released: 17 October 1987; Label: PDU; Formats: LP, CD, cassette	5	—	—	—	—	—		
Ridi pagliaccio	Released: 20 October 1988; Label: PDU; Formats: LP, CD, cassette	2	51	—	—	—	—		
Uiallalla	Released: 14 October 1989; Label: PDU; Formats: LP, CD, cassette	4	67	—	—	—	—	ITA: 300,000	
Ti conosco mascherina	Released: 12 October 1990; Label: PDU; Formats: LP, CD, cassette	3	48	—	—	—	—		
Caterpillar	Released: 18 October 1991; Label: PDU; Formats: LP, CD, cassette	4	52	—	—	—	—		
Sorelle Lumière	Released: 24 October 1992; Label: PDU; Formats: LP, CD, cassette	4	60	—	—	—	—		
Mina canta i Beatles	Released: 11 June 1993; Label: PDU; Formats: LP, CD, cassette	3	42	—	—	—	—		
Lochness	Released: 29 October 1993; Label: PDU; Formats: LP, CD, cassette	1	29	—	—	—	—		
Canarino mannaro	Released: 21 October 1994; Label: PDU; Formats: LP, CD, cassette	1	30	—	—	—	—	ITA: 260,000	
Pappa di latte	Released: 20 October 1995; Label: PDU; Formats: CD, cassette, LP	4	32	—	—	—	—		
Cremona	Released: 18 September 1996; Label: PDU; Formats: CD, cassette, LP	2	25	—	—	—	—	ITA: 500,000	
Napoli	Released: 28 November 1996; Label: PDU; Formats: CD, cassette, LP	4	29	—	—	—	—		
Leggera	Released: 17 October 1997; Label: PDU; Formats: CD, cassette, LP	1	28	—	—	—	—		
Nostalgias	Released: 1998; Label: RTI Music; Formats: CD	—	—	—	—	—	—		
Mina Celentano (with Adriano Celentano)	Released: 14 May 1998; Label: PDU; Formats: CD, cassette, LP	1	26	—	—	39	—	ITA: 2,000,000; Europe: 1,000,000	FIMI: 2× Diamond; IFPI Europe: Platinum
Olio	Released: 15 апреля 1999; Label: PDU; Formats: CD, cassette, LP	1	26	—	—	—	—	ITA: 200,000	FIMI: 2× Platinum
Mina Nº 0	Released: 12 November 1999; Label: PDU; Formats: CD, cassette	2	36	—	—	—	—		
Dalla terra	Released: 6 October 2000; Label: PDU; Formats: CD, cassette	3	33	—	—	—	—	ITA: 200,000	
Sconcerto	Released: 19 April 2001; Label: PDU; Formats: CD, cassette	2	34	—	—	—	—	ITA: 200,000	
Veleno	Released: 25 October 2002; Label: PDU; Formats: CD, cassette	2	47	—	—	—	—		FIMI: 2× Platinum
Napoli secondo estratto	Released: November 2003; Label: PDU; Formats: CD, cassette	8	—	—	—	—	—		
Bula Bula	Released: 13 January 2005; Label: PDU; Formats: CD, cassette	1	—	—	—	95	—	ITA: 130,000	
L'allieva	Released: 11 November 2005; Label: PDU; Formats: CD, LP	4	—	—	—	—	—	ITA: 130,000	
Bau	Released: 24 November 2006; Label: PDU; Formats: CD, LP	5	—	42	—	—	—		FIMI: 2× Platinum
Todavía	Released: 21 September 2007; Label: PDU; Formats: CD	1	—	—	36	—	—		FIMI: Platinum
Sulla tua bocca lo dirò	Released: 20 February 2009; Label: PDU; Formats: CD, LP, digital download	2	—	—	—	—	—		FIMI: Gold
Facile	Released: 30 October 2009; Label: PDU; Formats: CD, LP, digital download	5	—	—	—	—	—		FIMI: Gold
Caramella	Released: 25 May 2010; Label: PDU; Formats: CD, LP, digital download	3	—	6	—	—	—		FIMI: Gold
Piccolino	Released: 22 November 2011; Label: PDU; Formats: CD, LP, digital download	6	—	—	—	—	—		FIMI: Gold
12 (American Song Book)	Released: 4 December 2012; Label: PDU; Formats: CD, LP, digital download	6	—	42	—	—	—		FIMI: Gold
Christmas Song Book	Released: 19 November 2013; Label: PDU; Formats: CD, LP, digital download	6	—	—	—	—	—		FIMI: Platinum
Selfie	Released: 10 June 2014; Label: PDU; Formats: CD, LP, digital download	5	—	—	—	—	—		
Le migliori (with Adriano Celentano)	Released: 11 November 2016; Label: PDU; Formats: CD, LP, digital download	1	—	—	—	23	49	ITA: 350,000	FIMI: 7× Platinum
Maeba	Released: 28 March 2018; Label: PDU; Formats: CD, LP, digital download	1	—	—	—	35	—	ITA: 25,000	FIMI: Gold
Mina Fossati (with Ivano Fossati)	Released: 22 November 2019; Label: PDU; Formats: CD, LP, digital download	2	—	—	—	26	—	ITA: 50,000	FIMI: Platinum
Ti amo come un pazzo	Released: 21 April 2023; Label: PDU; Formats: CD, LP, digital download	4	—	—	—	—	—		
Gassa d'amante	Released: 22 November 2024; Label: PDU; Formats: CD, LP, cassette, digital download	3	—	—	—	—	—		
"—" denotes a recording that did not chart or was not released in that territory.

== Live albums ==
Title	Album details	Peak chart positions
Title	Album details	ITA
Mina alla Bussola dal vivo	Released: May 1968; Label: PDU; Formats: LP, cassette	1
Dalla Bussola	Released: November 1972; Label: PDU; Formats: LP, cassette	2
Mina Live '78	Released: October 1978; Label: PDU; Formats: LP, 8-Trk, cassette	4
Live 1970	Released: 18 April 2026; Label: PDU; Formats: LP, CD	—
"—" denotes a recording that did not chart or was not released in that territory.

== Compilation albums ==
List of Mina's main and charted compilations
Title	Album details	Peak chart positions						Sales	Certifications
Title	Album details	ITA	GRE	EU	SPA	SWI	SWI RO	Sales	Certifications
20 successi di Mina	Released: 11 April 1964; Label: Italdisc; Formats: LP	—	—	—	—	—	—		
Mina Nº 7	Released: 5 October 1964; Label: Italdisc; Formats: LP	—	—	—	—	—	—		
Mina interpretata da Mina	Released: 16 July 1965; Label: Italdisc; Formats: LP	—	—	—	—	—	—		
Un'ora con loro (with Giorgio Gaber)	Released: October 1965; Label: Ri-Fi; Formats: LP	10	—	—	—	—	—		
Mina canta Napoli	Released: January 1966; Label: Italdisc; Formats: LP	—	—	—	—	—	—		
4 anni di successi	Released: November 1967; Label: Ri-Fi; Formats: LP	2	—	—	—	—	—		
Appuntamento con Mina	Released: 1968; Label: PDU; Formats: LP, cassette	—	—	—	—	—	—		
Stasera...Mina	Released: 1968; Label: PDU; Formats: 8-Trk, cassette	—	—	—	—	—	—		
Mina d'estate	Released: June 1969; Label: PDU; Formats: 8-Trk, cassette	—	—	—	—	—	—		
Incontro con Mina	Released: July 1969; Label: PDU; Formats: LP	—	—	—	—	—	—		
Mina con voi	Released: September 1969; Label: PDU; Formats: LP	—	—	—	—	—	—		
Mina per voi	Released: 1969; Label: PDU; Formats: LP	—	—	—	—	—	—		
Del mio meglio n. 1	Released: April 1971; Label: PDU; Formats: LP, cassette	1	—	—	—	—	—		
Del mio meglio n. 2	Released: April 1973; Label: PDU; Formats: LP, cassette	4	—	—	—	—	—		
Evergreens	Released: May 1974; Label: PDU; Formats: касета	—	—	—	—	—	—		
Del mio meglio n. 3	Released: March 1975; Label: PDU; Formats: LP, 8-Trk, cassette	4	—	—	—	—	—		
Del mio meglio n. 4	Released: March 1976; Label: PDU; Formats: LP, 8-Trk, cassette	—	—	—	—	—	—		
Di tanto in tanto	Released: 1978; Label: PDU; Formats: 8-Trk	—	—	—	—	—	—		
Del mio meglio n. 5	Released: May 1979; Label: PDU; Formats: LP, cassette	—	—	—	—	—	—		
Del mio meglio n. 6 – Live	Released: June 1981; Label: PDU; Formats: LP, cassette	—	—	—	—	—	—		
Del mio meglio n. 7	Released: April 1983; Label: PDU; Formats: LP, CD	—	—	—	—	—	—		
Del mio meglio n. 8	Released: May 1985; Label: PDU; Formats: LP, CD	—	—	—	—	—	—		
Del mio meglio n. 9	Released: May 1987; Label: PDU; Formats: LP, CD	—	—	—	—	—	—		
Oggi ti amo di più	Released: February 1988; Label: PDU; Formats: CD, LP	1	—	—	—	—	—		
Mazzini canta Battisti	Released: 13 May 1994; Label: PDU; Formats: CD	5	—	64	—	—	—		
Mina & Battisti	Released: 1996; Label: RCA; Formats: CD, MC	27	—	—	—	—	—		
Canzoni d'autore	Released: 21 June 1996; Label: PDU; Formats: CD	5	—	46	—	—	—		
Minantologia	Released: 20 June 1997; Label: PDU; Formats: CD	10	—	72	—	—	—		
Brava Mina	Released: 1997; Label: WEA; Formats: CD, MC	17	—	—	—	—	—		
Mina Gold	Released: 1998; Label: Carosello; Formats: CD	29	—	—	—	—	—		
Mina Sanremo	Released: 1998; Label: PDU; Formats: LP	24	—	—	—	—	—		
Studio Collection	Released: 25 November 1998; Label: PDU / EMI; Formats: CD, cassette	8	—	96	—	—	—		
Mina Gold 2	Released: 1999; Label: MBO; Formats: CD	38	—	—	—	—	—		
Love Collection	Released: May 2000; Label: EMI; Formats: CD, cassette	16	—	—	—	—	—		
Le canzoni d'amore	Released: 2000; Label: Ricordi; Formats: CD	29	—	—	—	—	—		
Colección latina	Released: March 2001; Label: EMI; Formats: CD	20	—	—	—	—	—		
Una storia. Il mito	Released: 2002; Label: MBO; Formats: CD	46	—	—	—	—	—		
In duo	Released: 4 March 2003; Label: EMI; Formats: CD, cassette	6	—	72	—	—	—		
Napoli primo, secondo e terzo estratto	Released: 2003; Label: PDU; Formats: CD	—	—	—	—	—	—		
The Platinum Collection	Released: February 2004; Label: PDU; Formats: LP	1	—	—	—	—	—	ITA: 600 000	FIMI: Platinum
Una Mina d'amore	Released: 2004; Label: Carosello; Formats: CD	—	—	—	—	—	—		
The Platinum Collection 2	Released: 2006; Label: PDU; Formats: CD	8	—	—	—	—	—		
Ti amo...	Released: 16 June 2006; Label: PDU; Formats: CD	29	—	—	—	—	—		
Tutto Mina – Le origini	Released: 2006; Label: Warner Music Italia; Formats: CD	29	—	—	—	—	—		
Love Box	Released: 2007; Label: EMI; Formats: CD	44	—	—	—	—	—		
Mina сanta Sinatra	Released: 2007; Label: Steamroller; Formats: CD	85	—	—	—	—	—		
The Best of Platinum Collection	Released: 15 October 2007; Label: EMI; Formats: CD	38	—	—	—	—	—		FIMI: Gold
Straniera	Released: 12 June 2009; Label: GSU; Formats: CD	80	—	—	—	—	—		
Con archi	Released: 12 June 2009; Label: GSU; Formats: CD	78	—	—	—	—	—		
Cover	Released: 12 June 2009; Label: GSU; Formats: CD	82	—	—	—	—	—		
La calma	Released: 12 June 2009; Label: GSU; Formats: CD	81	—	—	—	—	—		
Per quando ti amo	Released: 12 June 2009; Label: GSU; Formats: CD	87	—	—	—	—	—		
Je suis Mina	Released: 22 March 2011; Label: EMI; Formats: CD, digital download	48	—	—	—	—	—		
I Am Mina	Released: 22 March 2011; Label: EMI; Formats: CD, digital download	57	—	—	—	—	—		
Yo soy Mina	Released: 22 March 2011; Label: EMI; Formats: CD, digital download	55	—	—	99	—	—		
Scritte per Mina – Firmato: Paolo Limiti	Released: 4 June 2013; Label: EMI; Formats: CD, digital download	17	—	—	—	—	—		
I miei preferiti – Gli anni RAI	Released: 7 May 2014; Label: GSU; Formats: CD	17	—	—	—	—	—		
Gli originali	Released: 9 December 2014; Label: PDU; Formats: CD	—	—	—	—	—	—		
The Collection 3.0	Released: 31 March 2015; Label: PDU; Formats: CD, digital download	18	—	—	—	—	—		FIMI: Platinum
Tutte le migliori (with Adriano Celentano)	Released: 1 December 2017; Label: PDU, Clan Celentano; Formats: CD, digital download	3	—	—	—	53	—		
Paradiso (Lucio Battisti Songbook)	Released: 30 November 2018; Label: PDU; Formats: CD, LP, digital download	2	—	—	—	—	—		FIMI: Platinum
Orione (Italian Songbook)	Released: 27 November 2020; Label: PDU, Warner Music Italy; Formats: CD, LP, digital download	4	—	—	—	—	—		
Cassiopea (Italian Songbook)	Released: 27 November 2020; Label: PDU, Sony Music; Formats: CD, LP, digital download	3	—	—	—	78	—		
MinaCelentano – The Complete Recordings (with Adriano Celentano)	Released: 26 November 2021; Label: Clan Celentano, PDU, Sony Music; Formats: CD, LP, digital download	10	—	—	—	—	—		
Encadenados	Released: 21 October 2022; Label: PDU; Formats: LP, USB, magnetic tape	—	—	—	—	—	—		
Mina in Studio 2001–2021	Released: 21 October 2022; Label: PDU; Formats: LP, USB, magnetic tape, digital download	—	—	—	—	—	—		
Dilettevoli eccedenze	Released: 4 November 2022; Label: PDU; Formats: LP, USB, magnetic tape, digital download	—	—	—	—	—	—		
The Beatles Songbook	Released: 18 November 2022; Label: Warner Music Italy; Formats: CD, LP, digital download	9	—	—	—	—	—		
Dilettevoli eccedenze 2	Released: 1 December 2022; Label: PDU; Formats: CD, LP, digital download	93	—	—	—	—	—		
1963/1967	Released: 7 November 2025; Label: PDU, Peer-Southern; Formats: LP, digital download	47	—	—	—	—	—		
1963/1967 – Rarità e versioni alternative	Released: 7 November 2025; Label: PDU, Pirames; Formats: CD	84	—	—	—	—	—		
Dilettevoli inedite eccedenze	Released: 9 October 2026; Label: PDU, Pirames; Formats: CD, LP, digital download	8	—	—	—	—	—		
"—" denotes a recording that did not chart or was not released in that territory.

Other compilations

- 1983 – L'album di Mina
- 1986 – Mina Export Vol. 1
- 1986 – Mina Export Vol. 2
- 1986 – Mina Ornella
- 1987 – Tua... Mina
- 1987 – L'oro di Mina
- 1987 – Hit Parade Vol. 1 1964-65
- 1987 – Hit Parade Vol. 2 1966-67
- 1987 – Una Mina fa
- 1988 – Mina Americana
- 1988 – L'immensità
- 1989 – Mina rarità
- 1989 – E adesso sono tua...
- 1990 – Speciale Mina
- 1990 – Italian compilation
- 1990 – Brava!
- 1990 – Personale di Mina
- 1990 – 15 Grandi successi di Mina
- 1991 – Mina Brava
- 1991 – Mina il cielo in una stanza
- 1991 – Summertime
- 1992 – España, mi amor...
- 1993 – Mina ...Di baci
- 1993 – Signori... Mina! vol. 1
- 1993 – Signori... Mina! vol. 2
- 1993 – Signori... Mina! vol. 3
- 1993 – Signori... Mina! vol. 4
- 1995 – Mina canta in inglese
- 1995 – Mina canta in spagnolo
- 1995 – SuperMina Vol. 1
- 1996 – Le canzoni d'amore degli anni 60
- 1996 – Heisser Sand
- 1996 – Un anno d'amore
- 1996 – Le Canzonissime Vol. 1
- 1996 – Le Canzonissime Vol. 2
- 1997 – Fantastica...
- 1997 – La Mina del Sabato Sera
- 1997 – I duetti di Teatro 10
- 1997 – Extra Mina Vol. 1
- 1997 – Extra Mina Vol. 2
- 1997 – Mina Madrid
- 1997 – Mina studio 1
- 1997 – Il cielo in una stanza
- 1998 – Internazionale
- 1998 – Mina latina
- 1999 – Brava Mina 2
- 1999 – Mina latina due
- 1999 – Notre étoile
- 2000 – Mina in the world
- 2000 – Sanremo
- 2000 — Le canzoni d'amore
- 2002 – Mina per Wind 2º volume
- 2002 – ...Se tornasse caso mai
- 2005 – Le più belle canzoni di Mina
- 2006 – Del mio meglio n. 10 — Live
- 2006 – Tutto Mina. Le origini
- 2007 – Magica/Straordinaria
- 2007 – Fantastica / La mia storia
- 2007 – Love Box
- 2007 – Mina canta Sinatra
- 2007 – The Best of Platinum Collection
- 2007 – Grande grande grande
- 2009 – Città vuota
- 2010 – I successi di Mina
- 2010 – Italian Style presenta Mina
- 2010 – Ritratto: I singoli Vol. 1
- 2010 – Ritratto: I singoli Vol. 2
- 2010 – Io Baby Gate
- 2010 – The Essential: Ri-Fi Record
- 2010 – Mina Studio Uno
- 2011 – Mina — Le origini
- 2011 – I primi successi
- 2011 – Tintarella di luna
- 2011 – Mina... e le altre
- 2012 – Se telefonando
- 2012 – E se domani
- 2012 – Brava
- 2012 – Mina canta Battisti
- 2013 – Scritte per Mina. Firmato Paolo Limiti

== Video albums ==
Title	Album details	Peak chart positions	Sales
Title	Album details	ITA	Sales
Mina In Studio	Released: 2001; Label: GSU S.A.; Formats: DVD, VHS	—	
Mina Alla Bussola Live 72	Released: 2003; Label: Copia D'Autore S.r.l; Formats: DVD	2	
Mina nei caroselli Barilla	Released: 2003; Label: Copia D'Autore S.r.l.; Formats: DVD	—	
Mina gli anni Rai	Released: 2008; Label: PDU; Formats: DVD (Box Set)	—	ITA: 500 000
InDVDbile	Released: 2013; Label: GSU; Formats: DVD	1	
I miei preferiti – Gli anni RAI	Released: 7 May 2014; Label: GSU; Formats: DVD	17	
"—" denotes a recording that did not chart or was not released in that territory.

== EPs ==
Title	Album details
Sanremo 1959	Released: 1959; Label: Italdisc; Formats: LP
Baby Gate	Released: 1959; Label: Italdisc; Formats: LP
Tintarella di luna	Released: 1959; Label: Italdisc; Formats: LP
Al Festival di Sanremo	Released: 1960; Label: Italdisc; Formats: LP
Folle banderuola	Released: 1960; Label: Italdisc; Formats: LP
Mina	Released: 1960; Label: Italdisc; Formats: LP
Una zebra a pois	Released: 1960; Label: Italdisc; Formats: LP
Mina canta Napoli	Released: 1960; Label: Italdisc; Formats: LP
Il cielo in una stanza	Released: 1960; Label: Italdisc; Formats: LP
11° Festival di Sanremo	Released: 1961; Label: Italdisc; Formats: LP
Cappuccetto rosso	Released: October 1964; Label: Ri-Fi; Formats: LP
Mina	Released: 1968; Label: PDU; Formats: LP
Mina per Wind	Released: 2000; Label: PDU; Formats: CD
Mina per Wind 2º volume	Released: 2002; Label: PDU; Formats: CD
Piccola strenna	Released: 30 November 2010; Label: PDU; Formats: CD, digital download
1963/1967 – Dilettevoli eccedenze	Released: 7 November 2025; Label: PDU, Pirames; Formats: digital download

== See also ==
- Mina singles discography
- List of best-selling albums in Italy
