= The Best of Platinum Collection =

Compilation album by Mina
- Released: 15 October 2007
- Recorded: 1968–1986
- Genre: Pop; rock
- Length: 74:55
- Language: Italian
- Label: EMI

Mina chronology
| Todavía (2007) | The Best of Platinum Collection (2007) | Sulla tua bocca lo dirò (2009) |

The Best of Platinum Collection is a compilation album by Italian singer Mina, released on 15 October 2007 by EMI. The album features selected tracks from the compilations The Platinum Collection (2004) and The Platinum Collection 2 (2006). The song "Uappa" was also added, which was not included in the previous compilations. All songs are arranged in chronological order. In 2009, the album received a gold certification in Italy.

== Track listing ==
| No. | Title | Writer(s) | Original album | Length |
|---|---|---|---|---|
| 1. | "Vorrei che fosse amore" | Antonio Amurri; Bruno Canfora | Canzonissima '68 (1968) | 2:26 |
| 2. | "Bugiardo e incosciente" | Paolo Limiti; Joan Manuel Serrat | ...bugiardo più che mai... più incosciente che mai... (1969) | 6:18 |
| 3. | "Non credere" | Mogol; Ascri; Roberto Soffici | ...bugiardo più che mai... più incosciente che mai... (1969) | 4:06 |
| 4. | "Insieme" | Mogol; Lucio Battisti | ...quando tu mi spiavi in cima a un batticuore... (1970) | 4:07 |
| 5. | "Grande, grande, grande" | Alberto Testa; Tony Renis | Mina (1971) | 3:56 |
| 6. | "Amor mio" | Mogol; Battisti | Mina (1971) | 4:43 |
| 7. | "Io e te da soli" | Mogol; Battisti | Del mio meglio (1971) | 4:31 |
| 8. | "Parole parole" | Gianni Ferrio; Leo Chiosso; Giancarlo Del Re | Cinquemilaquarantatre (1972) | 3:55 |
| 9. | "E poi..." | Andrea Lo Vecchio; Shel Shapiro | Frutta e verdura (1972) | 4:48 |
| 10. | "L'importante è finire" | Cristiano Malgioglio; Alberto Anelli | La Mina (1975) | 3:17 |
| 11. | "Uappa" | Enrico Riccardi; Luigi Albertelli | La Mina (1975) | 3:20 |
| 12. | "Non gioco più" | Ferrio; Roberto Lerici | Del mio meglio n. 3 (1975) | 2:53 |
| 13. | "Ma che bontà" | Riccardi | Mina con bignè 1977) | 3:00 |
| 14. | "Ancora, ancora, ancora" | Malgioglio; Gian Pietro Felisatti | Live '78 (1978) | 4:13 |
| 15. | "Città vuota (It's a Lonely Town)" | Giuseppe Cassia; Doc Pomus; Mort Shuman | Live '78 (1978) | 4:59 |
| 16. | "Devi dirmi di sì" | Massimiliano Pani; Piero Cassano; Valentino Alfano | Mina 25 (1983) | 4:12 |
| 17. | "Questione di feeling" | Mogol; Riccardo Cocciante | Finalmente ho conosciuto il conte Dracula... (1985) | 4:33 |
| 18. | "Via di qua" | Giorgio Calabrese; Pani | Sì, buana (1986) | 4:51 |
| Total length: | | | | 74:55 |

== Charts ==
Chart performance for The Best of Platinum Collection
| Chart (2007) | Peak position |
|---|---|
| Italian Albums (FIMI) | 38 |

== Certifications and sales ==
Certifications for The Best of Platinum Collection
| Region | Certification | Certified units/sales |
|---|---|---|
| Italy (FIMI) | Gold | 40,000^{*} |
^{*} Sales figures based on certification alone.
