= In duo =

Compilation album by Mina
- Released: 4 March 2003
- Recorded: 1972–1997
- Genre: Pop; rock
- Length: 68:23
- Language: Italian
- Label: EMI

Mina chronology
Veleno (2002)	In duo (2003)	Napoli secondo estratto (2003)

In duo is a compilation album by Italian singer Mina, released on 4 March 2003 by EMI. The album features Mina's duets with various artists recorded throughout her career.

== Overview ==
Fifteen duet compositions are presented in In duo. Among the songs contained is the famous "Parole parole", the final theme of the TV show Teatro 10 (sung in a duet with Alberto Lupo. "La canzone di Marinella", sung in duet with Fabrizio De Andre, in a version made in 1997 at the studios of GSU Lugano, the last official studio recording of the Genoese singer and songwriter. "Sono ancora" was recorded without instruments in collaboration with the vocal quintet Le Voci Atroci. And also the song "Come stai", recorded with Mina's son, Massimiliano Pani, which was written and arranged by him.

== Track listing ==
No.	Title	Lyrics	Music	Original album	Length
1.	"Stay with Me (Stay)" (with Piero Pelù)	Siobhan Fahey; Marcella Detroit; Jean Guiot; Maurizio Morante	Fahey; Detroit; Guiot	Olio (1999)	4:13
2.	"Questione di feeling" (with Riccardo Cocciante)	Mogol	Riccardo Cocciante	Finalmente ho conosciuto il conte Dracula... (1985)	4:15
3.	"Neri" (with Renato Zero)	Renato Zero	Giulia Fasolino	Mina Nº 0 (1999)	5:18
4.	"Via di qua" (with Fausto Leali)	Giorgio Calabrese	Massimiliano Pani	Sì, buana (1986)	4:51
5.	"Rotola la vita" (with Audio 2)	Giovanni Donzelli; Vincenzo Leomporro	Donzelli; Leomporro	Canarino mannaro (1994)	4:48
6.	"Suona ancora" (with Le Voci Atroci)	Fernando Masi; Alioscia Bisceglia; Giuliano Palma; Michele Pauli; Alessio Argenteri	Masi; Bisceglia; Palma; Pauli; Argenteri	Leggera (1997)	4:24
7.	"Dottore" (with Beppe Grillo)	Carlo Fava; Gianluca Martinelli	Fava	Cremona (1996)	5:29
8.	"Come stai?" (with Massimiliano Pani)	Pani; Calabrese; Claudia Ferrandi	Pani	Sorelle Lumière (1992)	4:35
9.	"Amore" (with Riccardo Cocciante)	Maurizio Monti	Cocciante	Canarino mannaro (1994)	5:20
10.	"Contigo en la distancia" (with Angel "Pato" Garcia)	César Portillo De La Luz	De La Luz	Salomè (1981)	3:13
11.	"Parole parole" (with Alberto Lupo)	Leo Chiosso; Giancarlo Del Re	Gianni Ferrio	Cinquemilaquarantatre (1972)	3:56
12.	"Someday in My Life" (with Mick Hucknall)	Mick Hucknall	Hucknall	Leggera (1997)	4:02
13.	"Noi" (with Massimo Lopez)	Mauro Santoro	Santoro	Canarino mannaro (1994)	5:27
14.	"E l'era tardi" (with Enzo Jannacci)	Enzo Jannacci	Jannacci	Mina quasi Jannacci (1977)	3:32
15.	"La canzone di Marinella" (with Fabrizio De André)	Fabrizio De André	De André	Previously unreleased	5:03
Total length:					68:23

== Charts ==
Chart performance for In duo
Chart (2003)	Peak position
European Albums (Music & Media)	72
Italian Albums (FIMI)	6
