= The Platinum Collection (Mina album) =

Compilation album by Mina
- Released: 20 February 2004
- Recorded: 1968–2003
- Genre: Pop; rock
- Length: 218:00
- Language: Italian; English; Spanish
- Label: EMI

Mina chronology
Napoli secondo estratto (2003)	The Platinum Collection (2004)	Bula Bula (2005)

The Platinum Collection is a compilation album by Italian singer Mina, released on 20 February 2004 by EMI.

== Overview ==
The 52-track, three-disc box set details Mina's recording career at PDU starting in 1968. The set highlights Mina's best moments and give a depth that is essential to her fans, but does not include any tracks recorded by Mina for Italdisc (1959-1964) or Ri-Fi (1964-1967).

Some rare songs previously published only on vinyl records were published here for the first time: "Caro" (B-side of the single "Vorrei che fosse amore", 1968), "Dai dai domani" (B-side of "Glaube Ihr Nicht" or "Non credere", 1969), "La musica e finita" (published in the 1968 album Le più belle canzoni italiane interpretate da Mina) and "Can't Take My Eyes Off You" (the Italian version first appeared on the 1968 live album Mina alla Bussola dal vivo, and in 2003 Mina re-recorded the English version and released it as a single).

The album reached the first place in the Italian album chart, in total it stayed on the chart for 172 weeks (almost a year in the top twenty and three years in total). Also in 2011, the album was certified gold in Italy, and platinum in 2014.

In 2006, the compilation was reissued in the limited box set The Platinum Collection Special Edition, along with the continuation of this compilation The Platinum Collection 2.

== Track listing ==
Disc 1: 1968–1975
No.	Title	Writer(s)	Length
1.	"L'importante è finire"	Cristiano Malgioglio; Alberto Anelli	3:17
2.	"Non gioco più"	Roberto Lerici; Gianni Ferrio	2:53
3.	"Amor mio"	Mogol; Lucio Battisti	4:43
4.	"Io e te da soli"	Mogol; Battisti	4:31
5.	"Insieme"	Mogol; Battisti	4:07
6.	"Parole parole" (with Alberto Lupo)	Leo Chiosso; Giancarlo Del Re; Ferrio	3:55
7.	"Bugiardo e incosciente (La tieta)"	Paolo Limiti; Joan Manuel Serrat	6:18
8.	"Non credere"	Mogol; Luigi Clausetti; Roberto Soffici	4:06
9.	"E poi..."	Andrea Lo Vecchio; Shel Shapiro	4:48
10.	"Emozioni"	Mogol; Battisti	4:33
11.	"La voce del silenzio"	Mogol; Limiti; Elio Isola	3:46
12.	"Fa qualcosa"	Alberto Testa; Walter Malgoni	3:55
13.	"Vorrei che fosse amore"	Antonio Amurri; Bruno Canfora	2:26
14.	"E penso a te"	Mogol; Battisti	3:38
15.	"Zum zum zum"	Amurri; Canfora	2:36
16.	"Grande, grande, grande"	Testa; Tony Renis	3:56
17.	"Caro"	Mina; Maurizio Seymandi; Augusto Martelli	3:15
18.	"Dai dai domani (A praça)"	Limiti; Carlos Imperial	2:57
19.	"La musica è finita"	Nisa; Franco Califano; Umberto Bindi	3:08
Total length:			72:48

Disc 2: 1976–1989
No.	Title	Writer(s)	Length
1.	"Questione di feeling" (with Riccardo Cocciante)	Mogol; Riccardo Cocciante	4:33
2.	"Ancora, ancora, ancora"	Malgioglio; Gian Pietro Felisatti	4:13
3.	"Magica follia"	Lo Vecchio	3:53
4.	"Les cornichons (Big Nick)"	Nino Ferrer; James Booker	2:59
5.	"Una lunga storia d'amore"	Gino Paoli	3:25
6.	"Già visto"	Massimiliano PaniCelso Valli	5:13
7.	"Momento magico"	Anselmo Genovese	6:18
8.	"Allora sì"	Califano; Massimo Guantini	4:10
9.	"Via di qua" (with Fausto Leali)	Giorgio Calabrese; Pani	4:51
10.	"Senza fiato"	Osvaldo Miccichè; Anselmo Genovese	4:01
11.	"Se il mio canto sei tu"	Paola Blandi; Beppe Cantarelli	4:22
12.	"Rose su rose"	Pani; Piero Cassano	3:56
13.	"Ma che bontà"	Enrico Riccardi	2:59
14.	"Un'aquila nel cuore"	Genovese	3:32
15.	"Buonanotte, buonanotte"	Carla Vistarini; Fabio Massimo Cantini	5:54
16.	"Città vuota (It's a Lonely Town)" (1978 version)	Giuseppe Cassia; Doc Pomus; Mort Shuman	4:59
17.	"Tres palabras"	Osvaldo Farrés	3:21
18.	"Il cielo in una stanza" (with Renato Sellani)	Paoli	2:41
Total length:			75:20

Disc 3: 1990–2003
No.	Title	Writer(s)	Length
1.	"Neve"	Giovanni Donzelli; Vincenzo Leomporro	5:16
2.	"Il pazzo"	Giancarlo Bigazzi	4:05
3.	"Volami nel cuore"	Testa; Manrico Mologni; Gualtiero Malgoni	3:32
4.	"Johnny"	Giulia Fasolino	4:53
5.	"Non c'è più audio"	Donzelli; Leomporro	4:44
6.	"In vista della sera"	Camillo Castellari; Corrado Castellari	5:06
7.	"Can't Take My Eyes Off You"	Bob Gaudio, Bob Crewe	5:23
8.	"Un'estate fa (Une belle histoire)"	Pierre Delanoë; Franco Califano; Michel Fugain	4:00
9.	"Fosse vero"	Alberto De Martini; Pani	4:16
10.	"Amore, amore, amore mio"	Castellari; Giacinto De Mitri	4:53
11.	"Raso" (with Audio 2)	Donzelli; Leomporro	4:26
12.	"Something"	George Harrison	3:01
13.	"Come stai?" (with Massimiliano Pani)	Pani; Calabrese; Claudia Ferrandi	4:28
14.	"Il corvo"	Marco Luberti	3:38
15.	"Fortissimo"	Lina Wertmüller; Canfora	5:54
16.	"Cry Me a River"	Arthur Hamilton	5:18
Total length:			69:52

In the first batch of the album on the third disc, the 1971 version of the song "Something" from the album Mina was mistakenly placed instead of the 1993 version from the album Mina canta i Beatles, in subsequent editions this was corrected.

== Charts ==
=== Weekly charts ===
Weekly chart performance for The Platinum Collection
Chart (2004)	Peak position
Italian Albums (FIMI)	1

=== Year-end charts ===
Year-end chart performance for The Platinum Collection
Chart (2004)	Position
Italian Albums (FIMI)	5

Year-end chart performance for The Platinum Collection
Chart (2005)	Position
Italian Albums (FIMI)	47

== Certifications and sales ==
Certifications for The Platinum Collection
Region	Certification	Certified units/sales
Italy (FIMI)	Platinum	650,000
