= The Collection 3.0 =

Compilation album by Mina
- Released: 31 March 2015
- Recorded: 1967–2012
- Genre: Pop; rock
- Length: 219:42
- Language: Italian; English
- Label: Warner
- Producer: Massimiliano Pani

Mina chronology
Selfie (2014)	The Collection 3.0 (2015)	Le migliori (2016)

The Collection 3.0 is a compilation album by Italian singer Mina, released on 31 March 2015 by Warner Music Italy.

== Overview ==
After the purchase of EMI, the label Warner Music Italy also acquired the rights to the catalog of Mina's songs. The success of the last two parts of The Platinum Collection prompted the label to release another one, which is why it is called The Collection 3.0. The compilation consists of three discs, each with 18 tracks. The album contains almost all the iconic hits of the singer from different periods of her career. Some of the songs were presented in an updated version, such as "Città vuota (It's a Lonely Town)" or "Il cielo in una stanza". Duet versions of some songs were also included on the album.

== Track listing ==
CD1
No.	Title	Writer(s)	Length
1.	"Grande, grande, grande"	Alberto Testa; Tony Renis	4:00
2.	"Amor mio"	Mogol; Lucio Battisti	4:49
3.	"Parole parole"	Gianni Ferrio; Leo Chiosso; Giancarlo Del Re	3:58
4.	"Vorrei che fosse amore"	Antonio Amurri; Bruno Canfora	2:28
5.	"E poi..."	Andrea Lo Vecchio; Shel Shapiro	4:52
6.	"Città vuota (It's a Lonely Town)"	Giuseppe Cassia; Doc Pomus; Mort Shuman	5:00
7.	"L'importante è finire"	Cristiano Malgioglio; Alberto Anelli	3:22
8.	"Non gioco più"	Ferrio; Roberto Lerici	2:56
9.	"Zum zum zum"	Amurri; Canfora	2:39
10.	"La voce del silenzio"	Mogol; Paolo Limiti; Amelio Isola	3:46
11.	"Sacumdì, sacumdà"	Limiti; Carlos Imperial	2:35
12.	"Nuda"	Don Backy	4:06
13.	"Un colpo al cuore"	Giancarlo Bigazzi; Mario Capuano	3:17
14.	"Bugiardo e incosciente"	Limiti; Joan Manuel Serrat	6:20
15.	"I discorsi"	Augusto Martelli; Mina	3:05
16.	"Ancora, ancora, ancora"	Malgioglio; Gian Pietro Felisatti	4:18
17.	"Non credere"	Mogol; Ascri; Roberto Soffici	4:07
18.	"La pioggia di marzo (Aguas de março)"	Antônio Carlos Jobim; Giorgio Calabrese	3:44
Total length:			69:22

CD2
No.	Title	Writer(s)	Length
1.	"Io e te da soli"	Mogol; Battisti	4:31
2.	"Emozioni"	Mogol; Battisti	4:36
3.	"Insieme"	Mogol; Battisti	4:09
4.	"E penso a te"	Mogol; Battisti	3:43
5.	"Una lunga storia d'amore"	Gino Paoli	3:29
6.	"Il cielo in una stanza"	Paoli	2:41
7.	"Fiori di rosa, fiori di pesco"	Mogol; Battisti	3:04
8.	"La canzone di Marinella"	Elvio Monti; Fabrizio De André	3:12
9.	"Eppur mi son scordato di te"	Mogol; Battisti	3:32
10.	"Vincenzina e la fabbrica"	Enzo Jannacci	3:53
11.	"Estate"	Bruno Brighetti; Bruno Martino	3:35
12.	"Amorevole"	Giuseppe Massara; Vito Pallavicini; Vittorio Buffoli	5:25
13.	"Que serà"	Chico Buarque De Hollanda; Luis Gómez-Escolar	5:26
14.	"Ormai"	Lo Vecchio	4:11
15.	"Ancora"	Francesco Migliacci; Claudio Mattone	4:25
16.	"Noi due nel mondo e nell'anima"	Roby Facchinetti; Valerio Negrini	4:25
17.	"Che male fa"	Carlo Marrale; Pierangelo Cassano; Salvatore Stellita	4:25
18.	"Napule è"	Pino Daniele	5:09
Total length:			73:51

CD3
No.	Title	Writer(s)	Length
1.	"Questione di feeling"	Mogol; Riccardo Cocciante	4:20
2.	"Neve"	Giovanni Donzelli; Vincenzo Leomporro	5:20
3.	"Oggi sono io"	Alex Britti	4:05
4.	"Fa' qualcosa"	Testa; Walter Malgoni	4:01
5.	"Se il mio canto sei tu"	Giuseppe Cantarelli; Paola Blandi	4:27
6.	"Anche tu"	Giuseppe Cantarelli; Cristiano Minellono	4:56
7.	"My Love"	Linda McCartney; Paul McCartney	4:15
8.	"Parlami d'amore Mariù"	Ennio Neri; Carlo Alberto Bixio	2:02
9.	"Ossessione '70"	Fausto Cigliano	3:52
10.	"Laia ladaia (Reza)" (Live)	Edu Lobo; Ruy Guerra	3:19
11.	"Devo dirti addio (Pra dizer adeus)"	Lobo; Bruno Lauzi	3:57
12.	"Un'estate fa"	Pierre Delanoë; Franco Califano; Michel Fugain	4:04
13.	"Portati via"	Stefano Borgia	3:56
14.	"Fortissimo"	Lina Wertmuller; Canfora	4:22
15.	"Can't Take My Eyes Off You"	Robert Gaudio; Bob Crewe	5:26
16.	"Mi parlavi adagio"	Calabrese; Remo Giazotto; Tomaso Albinoni	3:49
17.	"Mente"	Samuele Cerri; Ferrio	4:16
18.	"Over the Rainbow"	Harold Arlen; Yip Harburg	6:02
Total length:			76:29

== Charts ==
Chart performance for The Collection 3.0
Chart (2015)	Peak position
Italian Albums (FIMI)	18

== Certifications and sales ==
Certifications for The Collection 3.0
Region	Certification	Certified units/sales
Italy (FIMI)	Platinum	50,000^{‡}
^{‡} Sales+streaming figures based on certification alone.
