= Nostalgias (album) =

Studio album by Mina
- Released: 1998
- Recorded: 1994–1998
- Studio: Studi GSU, Lugano, Switzerland; Wolfi Studio, Rome, Italy
- Genre: Pop
- Length: 52:47
- Language: Spanish; English
- Label: PDU; RTI Music España
- Producer: Massimiliano Pani

Mina chronology
Mina Celentano (1998)	Nostalgias (1998)	Olio (1999)

Nostalgias is a studio album by Italian singer Mina, released by PDU and RTI Music España in 1998 in Spain and later in Argentina. The album contains Spanish versions of songs from her previous albums.

In October 2022, a remastered reissue of the album under the title Encadenados was released on analog tape, vinyl and USB.

== Overview ==
The songs "Hoy", "De acuerdo" and "Lo se" are Spanish versions of the songs "Noi" (duet with Massimo Lopez), "Va bene, va bene così" by Vasco Rossi and "Fosse vero", featured on the 1994 double album Canarino mannaro. "Porque tu me acostumbraste was first released in 1995 on Pappa di latte. "Nostalgias" is also in a different version than the version released on Lochness. The track "Crazy" is the only one not in Spanish, it is in English and taken from Canarino mannaro.

For the cover, Mauro Balletti uses a shot already used in 1980 for the single "Buonanotte buonanotte", adding other unreleased images of the same photo shoot.

== Track listing ==
Nostalgias track listing
No.	Title	Writer(s)	Length
1.	"Lo se"	Massimiliano Pani; Alberto DeMartini; Alberto Garcia Demestres	4:18
2.	"Porque tu me acostumbraste"	Frank Domínguez	4:16
3.	"Amore" (with Riccardo Cocciante)	Maurizio Monti; Riccardo Cocciante; Ignacio Ballesteros	5:15
4.	"De acuerdo"	Vasco Rossi; Roberto Casini; Domenico Camporeale; Alberto Garcia Demestres	5:26
5.	"Nostalgias"	Enrique Cadícamo; Juan Carlos Cobián	5:03
6.	"Puro teatro"	Tite Curet Alonso	4:01
7.	"Da vueltas la vida" (with Audio 2)	Giovanni Donzelli; Vincenzo Leomporro; Alberto Garcia Demestres	4:42
8.	"Somos novios"	Armando Manzanero	4:26
9.	"Crazy"	Willie Nelson	5:42
10.	"Encadenados"	Carlos Arturo Briz	4:15
11.	"Hoy"	Mauro Santoro; Alberto Garcia Demestres	5:23
Total length:			52:47

Encadenados track listing
No.	Title	Writer(s)	Length
1.	"Puro teatro"	Tite Curet Alonso	4:01
2.	"Porque tu me acostumbraste"	Frank Domínguez	4:15
3.	"Somos novios"	Armando Manzanero	4:31
4.	"Hoy"	Mauro Santoro; Alberto Garcia Demestres	5:18
5.	"Encadenados"	Carlos Arturo Briz	4:12
6.	"Lo se"	Massimiliano Pani; Alberto DeMartini; Alberto Garcia Demestres	4:18
7.	"De acuerdo"	Vasco Rossi; Roberto Casini; Domenico Camporeale; Alberto Garcia Demestres	5:26
8.	"Nostalgias"	Enrique Cadícamo; Juan Carlos Cobián	5:03
Total length:			37:04
