= Mina in Studio 2001–2021 =

Compilation album by Mina
- Released: 21 October 2022
- Recorded: 2001–2021
- Studio: Studi PDU, Lugano
- Genre: Pop; vocal jazz
- Length: 47:25
- Language: Italian; Spanish; English; Neapolitan
- Label: PDU
- Producer: Massimiliano Pani

Mina chronology
Encadenados (2022)	Mina in Studio 2001–2021 (2022)	Dilettevoli eccedenze (2022)

Mina in Studio 2001–2021 is a double compilation album by Italian singer Mina, released on 21 October 2022 by PDU.

== Overview ==
This album was released in honor of the twentieth anniversary of the release in 2001 of the video album Mina in Studio, which sold 50,000 copies and attracted millions of viewers on the Internet and was not subsequently reissued. For the first time, a double vinyl album is being released on audio media, which contains all 10 tracks made during the live recording sessions in 2001 with the addition of a new song recorded in 2021 with the same recording technique live in the studio, "Accarezzame".

The album contains jazz ballad from the Great American Songbook, two Latin Boleros and eternal songs of Italian traditions. The singer is accompanied by a group of jazz musicians and a string orchestra conducted by Gianni Ferrio.

== Critical reception ==
Claudio Milano from OndaRock stated that the album is an eternal masterpiece, both in the moments with the fusion band accompanying Mina's vocals and in the precious orchestral moments.

== Track listing ==
No.	Title	Writer(s)	Length
1.	"Tu sì 'na cosa grande"	Domenico Modugno; Roberto Gigli	4:24
2.	"Oggi sono io"	Alex Britti	3:51
3.	"Come hai fatto"	Domenico Modugno	4:38
4.	"Tres Palabras"	Osvaldo Farrés	4:00
5.	"La Barca"	Roberto Cantoral	3:56
6.	"Espérame En El Cielo"	Paquito López Vidal	3:45
7.	"Blue Moon"	Lorenz Hart; Richard Rodgers	5:47
8.	"The Nearness of You"	Ned Washington; Hoagy Carmichael	3:03
9.	"Ill Wind"	Harold Arlen; Ted Koehler	4:43
10.	"Pasqualino Marajà"	Domenico Modugno; Franco Migliacci	4:26
11.	"Accarezzame"	Nisa; Pino Calvi	4:45
Total length:			47:25

== Personnel ==
- Mina – vocals
- Gianni Ferrio – arrangement, conductor
- Mauro Balletti – art direction
- Giulia Fasolino, Manu Cortesi, Massimiliano Pani, Massimo Bozzi, Mina, Moreno Ferrara, Paul Rosette, Silvio Pozzoli – backing vocals
- Massimo Moriconi – bass, contrabass
- Christian Bellisario, Jennifer Flint, Johann Sebastian Paetsch – cello
- Ermanno Ferrari, Umberto Ferrari – contrabass
- Alfredo Golino – drums
- Carmine Di – mixing, recording
- Andrea Braido – guitar
- Celeste Frigo – mastering
- Stefano Pisetta – percussion
- ByFederico Leone – photography
- Danilo Rea – piano, electric piano, accordion
- Gian Paolo Guatteri, Loredana Botta, Matthias Müller – viola
- Anthony Flint – first violin
- Barbara Ciannamea, Crista Bohny-Nidecker, Cristina Tavazzi Savoldo, Duilio Galfetti, Fabio Arnaboldi, Hans Liviabella, Irina Roukavitsina, Walter Zagato – violin

Credits are adapted from the album's liner notes.
