= Love Collection =

Compilation album by Mina
- Released: May 2000
- Recorded: 1970–1993
- Studio: La Basilica, Milan; Studi PDU, Lugano
- Genre: Pop; rock
- Length: 116:48
- Language: Italian
- Label: EMI

Mina chronology
Mina per Wind (2000)	Love Collection (2000)	Dalla terra (2000)

Love Collection is a compilation album by Italian singer Mina, released in 2000 by EMI. It features love-themed songs recorded between 1970 and 1993, but does not include the main hits of the singer. The album reached sixteen position on the Italian albums chart.

== Critical reception ==
Professional ratings
Review scores
Source	Rating
AllMusic	1.5/5 stars

Bradley Torreano from AllMusic gave a negative assessment of the album, stating that it is filled with featureless and faceless tracks, which sometimes are not even saved by Mina's beautiful voice. Summing up, he stated that he does not recommend this album to anyone, because it does not compare with the singer's previous achievements.

== Track listing ==
Disc 1
No.	Title	Writer(s)	Length
1.	"Una lunga storia d'amore"	Gino Paoli	3:29
2.	"Colori"	Andrea Lo Vecchio; Simon Luca	5:15
3.	"Giuro di dirti la verità"	Cristiano Malgioglio; Corrado Castellari	4:27
4.	"Una canzone" (feat. New Trolls)	Vittorio De Scalzi; Nico Di Palo; Gianni Belleno; Ricky Belloni	4:13
5.	"La verità"	Sergio Bardotti; Armando Trovajoli; Carlo Pes	4:15
6.	"Noi due nel mondo e nell'anima"	Roby Facchinetti; Valerio Negrini	4:25
7.	"Fortissimo"	Lina Wertmüller; Bruno Canfora	4:23
8.	"Devo tornare a casa mia"	Luigi Clausetti	3:55
9.	"Non ti riconosco più"	Michele Anzoino; Dario Baldan Bembo	4:18
10.	"Amore mio"	Gina Basso; Bruno Canfora	3:40
11.	"La notte (La nuit)"	Nicola Salerno; Salvatore Adamo	3:52
12.	"Scrivimi"	Giovanni Raimondo; Enrico Frati	4:47
13.	"Amore, amore, amore mio"	Corrado Castellari; Giacinto De Mitri	5:00
14.	"Come stai?" (feat. Massimiliano Pani)	Massimiliano Pani; Giorgio Calabrese; Claudia Ferrandi	4:35
Total length:			60:34

Disc 2
No.	Title	Writer(s)	Length
1.	"Lui, lui, lui"	Paolo Limiti; Massimiliano Pani	4:16
2.	"L'altra metà di me"	Piergiorgio Benda	3:19
3.	"E tu come stai?"	Claudio Baglioni	5:09
4.	"Traditore"	Giorgio Faletti	4:33
5.	"Chitarra suona più piano" (feat. Ángel "Pato" García)	Franca Evangelisti; Marcello Marrocchi; Nicola Di Bari	3:18
6.	"Nessuno al mondo (No Arms Can Ever Hold You)"	Nino Rastelli; Art Crafer; Jimmy Nebb	2:38
7.	"Che male fa"	Piero Cassano; Aldo Stellita; Carlo Marrale	4:20
8.	"La vita goccia a goccia"	Franco Califano; Carlo Pes	4:34
9.	"Magia"	Andrea Lo Vecchio; Gino Mescoli	4:20
10.	"Adagio"	Paolo Limiti; Vittorio Buffoli; Mario Nobile	3:32
11.	"Distanze"	Luigi Albertelli; Roberto Soffici	4:39
12.	"Oroscopo"	Cristiano Malgioglio; Corrado Castellari	3:50
13.	"Da capo"	Marco Luberti; Riccardo Cocciante	3:21
14.	"Un'ora"	Antonio Amurri; Bruno Canfora	3:27
Total length:			55:16

== Charts ==
Chart performance for Love Collection
Chart (2000)	Peak position
Italian Albums (FIMI)	16
