= Le più belle canzoni italiane interpretate da Mina =

Studio album by Mina
- Released: 1968
- Genre: Pop
- Length: 36:47
- Language: Italian
- Label: PDU

Mina chronology
Mina alla Bussola dal vivo (1968)	Le più belle canzoni italiane interpretate da Mina (1968)	Canzonissima '68 (1968)

Le più belle canzoni italiane interpretate da Mina is a studio album by Italian singer Mina, released in 1968 by PDU.

== Overview ==
The tracks for this album were chosen by the readers of the Italian magazines Amica, La Domenica del Corriere and La Tribuna illustrata. According to the results of the voting, 10 songs were selected out of 80, cover versions of which Mina recorded for the album in her own manner. Only the songs "Il cielo in una stanza", "E se domani" and "Canzone per te" were previously published. This album was distributed exclusively among readers of the above-mentioned magazines as a gift for one of the issues. Nevertheless, a year later, Mina's album I discorsi was released, which features almost all the songs from this playlist (except for the songs "E se domani" and "La musica è finita", replaced by "I discorsi" and "La canzone di Marinella").

== Track listing ==
Side A
No.	Title	Writer(s)	Length
1.	"Il cielo in una stanza"	Gino Paoli; Mogol	2:29
2.	"E se domani"	Giorgio Calabrese; Carlo Alberto Rossi	3:08
3.	"Munastero 'e santa Chiara"	Michele Galdieri; Alberto Barberis	2:34
4.	"Canzone per te"	Sergio Endrigo; Sergio Bardotti	3:35
5.	"Ma l'amore no"	Giovanni D'Anzi; Galdieri	3:35
6.	"Se stasera sono qui"	Luigi Tenco; Mogol	3:32
Total length:			18:53

Side B
No.	Title	Writer(s)	Length
1.	"'O sole mio"	Eduardo Di Capua; Giovanni Capurro	3:44
2.	"La musica è finita"	Nicola Salerno; Franco Califano; Umberto Bindi	3:09
3.	"Io che amo solo te"	Sergio Endrigo	3:11
4.	"Non ti scordar di me"	Ernesto De Curtis; Domenico Furnò; Ernst Marischka	2:23
5.	"Silenzioso slow (Abbassa la tua radio per favor)"	D'Anzi; Alfredo Bracchi	2:58
6.	"Roma, nun fa la stupida stasera"	Armando Trovajoli; Pietro Garinei; Sandro Giovannini	2:29
Total length:			17:54

== Personnel ==
- Mina – vocals
- Augusto Martelli – arrangement, conducting

Credits are adapted from the album's liner notes.

== Charts ==
Chart performance for Le più belle canzoni italiane interpretate da Mina
Chart (2005)	Peak position
Italian Albums (FIMI)	65
