= Riassunti d'amore =

Box set by Mina
- Released: 12 June 2009
- Recorded: 1994–2007
- Studio: Studi PDU/GSU, Lugano; Cambiomusica Studio, Brescia; Studio 2, RSI, Lugano
- Genre: Pop; rock; jazz; religious
- Language: Italian; English; Spanish; Latin; Neapolitan
- Label: GSU; Sony
- Producer: Massimiliano Pani

Mina chronology
Sulla tua bocca lo dirò (2009)	Riassunti d'amore (2009)	Facile (2009)

Riassunti d'amore is a box set by Italian singer Mina, released on 12 June 2009 by GSU and distributed by Sony Music Italy. The box set includes five compilations with songs recorded by Mina from 1994 to 2007. The compilations were also released separately, all of them debuted on the Italian album chart.

== Track listing ==
=== Straniera ===
The album contains four songs in Spanish, previously unreleased in Italy: "Lo se (Fosse vero"), "Amore (Amore"), "Hoy (Noi"), "De acuerdo (Va bene, va bene così"). They are taken from the 1998 album Nostalgias, released only in Spanish-speaking countries.

1. "Wave (Vou te contar)" – 5:07
2. "Lo sé (Fosse vero)" – 4:24
3. "La fin des vacances" – 4:20
4. "One for My Baby (and One More for the Road)" – 4:40
5. "Amore (Amore)" (with Riccardo Cocciante) – 5:21
6. "Strangers in the Night" – 4:04
7. "Hoy (Noi)" – 5:26
8. "Crazy" – 5:46
9. "Encadenados" – 4:16
10. "De acuerdo (Va bene, va bene così)" – 5:32
11. "The Captain of Her Heart/Every Breath You Take" – 5:08
12. "¿Cómo estás? (Come stai)" – 4:36
13. "Someday in My Life" (with Mick Hucknall) – 4:02
14. "Puro teatro" – 4:01
15. "Come Together" – 7:42

=== Con archi ===
1. "Core 'ngrato" – 2:17
2. "Che m'importa del mondo" – 3:55
3. "Indifferentemente" – 4:38
4. "Come hai fatto" – 4:42
5. "Dulcis Christe" – 3:00
6. "Valsinha" (with Chico Buarque) – 2:50
7. "La seconda da sinistra" – 4:32
8. "Maruzzella" – 3:29
9. "Amara terra mia" – 4:19
10. "Maria mari'!..." – 3:08
11. "April in Paris" – 2:41
12. "Tu ca nun chiagne!" – 3:34
13. "Only the lonely" – 4:32
14. "Te voglio bene assaje" – 4:16
15. "Laura" – 3:41

=== Cover ===
This album contains songs from the EPs Mina per Wind (2000) and Mina per Wind 2º volume (2002), which were recorded by Mina for the telecommunications company Wind and distributed only as part of their special promotion. This was the first publication of tracks for commercial sale.

1. "Oggi sono io" – 3:57
2. "La canzone di Marinella" (with Fabrizio De André) – 5:03
3. "Somos novios" – 4:26
4. "Blowin' in the Wind" – 4:31
5. "Amaro è 'o bene" – 3:12
6. "Napule è" – 5:09
7. "Wind of Change" – 4:17
8. "Notturno delle tre" (with Ivano Fossati) – 4:23
9. "Amico" – 3:58
10. "A Rose in the Wind" – 4:18
11. "Cercami" – 5:23
12. "Night Wind Sent" – 4:19
13. "Ill Wind" – 4:40
14. "A Night in Tunisia/Penso positivo/Copacabana (At the Copa)" – 5:52
15. "Rosso" – 4:29

=== La calma ===
1. "All the Way" – 4:42
2. "Carmela" – 2:12
3. "The Nearness of You" – 3:28
4. "I' te vurria vasa'!..." – 5:51
5. "Good-Bye" – 2:55
6. "Passione" – 3:28
7. "These Foolish Things" – 5:32
8. "Blue Moon" – 6:19
9. "Canto largo" – 3:12
10. "Un año de amor (Un anno d'amore)" (with Diego "El Cigala") – 4:46
11. "Impagliatori d'aquile" – 4:12
12. "They Can't Take That Away from Me" – 4:13
13. "Je so pazzo" – 3:43
14. "Sincerely" – 4:04
15. "Chiedimi tutto" – 3:26

=== Per quando ti amo ===
1. "Se finisse tutto così" – 4:34
2. "Fra mille anni" – 4:26
3. "Nessun altro mai" – 4:32
4. "Dint'o viento" – 4:18
5. "Resta lì" – 4:45
6. "Tornerai qui da me" – 4:59
7. "Il pazzo" – 4:07
8. "Per poco che sia" – 3:29
9. "Sulamente pè parlà" – 4:11
10. "L'amore viene e se ne va" – 4:37
11. "Quella briciola di più" – 5:14
12. "Noi soli insieme" – 4:38
13. "Se" – 4:31
14. "Ecco il doman" – 3:31
15. "Succede" – 5:37

== Personnel ==
- Mina – vocals
- Mauro Balletti – graphics
- Stefania La Gioiosa – graphics
- Gianni Ronco – illustrations
- Alessandro "Gengy" Di Guglielmo – mastering
- Massimiliano Pani – production

Credits are adapted from the album's liner notes.

== Charts ==
Chart performance for Straniera
Chart (2009)	Peak position
Italian Albums (FIMI)	80

Chart performance for Con archi
Chart (2009)	Peak position
Italian Albums (FIMI)	78

Chart performance for Cover
Chart (2009)	Peak position
Italian Albums (FIMI)	82

Chart performance for La calma
Chart (2009)	Peak position
Italian Albums (FIMI)	81

Chart performance for Per quando ti amo
Chart (2009)	Peak position
Italian Albums (FIMI)	87
