= The Platinum Collection =

The Platinum Collection or Platinum Collection may refer to:

== Albums ==
- The Platinum Collection (Alicia Keys album)
- The Platinum Collection (Blancmange album)
- The Platinum Collection (Blondie album)
- The Platinum Collection (Blue album)
- The Platinum Collection (Chaka Khan album)
- The Platinum Collection (Cliff Richard album)
- The Platinum Collection (D:Ream album)
- The Platinum Collection (Dannii Minogue album)
- The Platinum Collection (David Bowie album)
- The Platinum Collection (Deep Purple album)
- The Platinum Collection (Dollar album)
- The Platinum Collection (The Doors album)
- The Platinum Collection (En Vogue album)
- The Platinum Collection (Enigma album)
- The Platinum Collection (Everything but the Girl album)
- The Platinum Collection (Faith No More album)
- The Platinum Collection (Frank Sinatra album)
- The Platinum Collection (Gary Moore album)
- The Platinum Collection (Glen Campbell album)
- The Platinum Collection (Guy Clark album)
- The Platinum Collection (Happy Mondays album)
- The Platinum Collection (Il Volo album)
- The Platinum Collection (Héroes Del Silencio album)
- The Platinum Collection Volume 1: Shout to the Lord (Hillsong)
- The Platinum Collection Volume 2: Shout to the Lord 2 (Hillsong)
- The Platinum Collection Volume 2: Shout to the Lord 3 (Hillsong)
- The Platinum Collection (John Williamson album)
- The Platinum Collection (Laura Branigan album)
- The Platinum Collection (Mike Oldfield album)
- The Platinum Collection (Mina album)
- The Platinum Collection (Nomadi album)
- The Platinum Collection (Peter Andre)
- The Platinum Collection (Phil Collins album)
- The Platinum Collection (Queen album)
- The Platinum Collection (Sandra album)
- The Platinum Collection (Scorpions album)
- The Platinum Collection (Take That album)
- The Platinum Collection (The Darkness album)
- The Platinum Collection (Tina Turner album)
- Platinum Collection (Genesis album)
- Platinum Collection (Rossa album), 2013
- Platinum Collection (Željko Joksimović album)
- Platinum Collection (Steps album), 2022
- The Best of Platinum Collection by Mina, 2007

== DVDs ==
- The Platinum Collection (DVD), by Shania Twain

== Games ==
- Xbox 360 Platinum Hits are known as "Platinum Collection games" in Japan.

== See also ==
- The Platinum Collection (Sounds of Summer Edition), a three-disc greatest hits album by American rock band the Beach Boys
