= I discorsi =

Studio album by Mina
- Released: 1969
- Recorded: 20 March 1969
- Genre: Pop
- Length: 37:08
- Language: Italian; Neapolitan
- Label: PDU

Mina chronology
Canzonissima '68 (1968)	I discorsi (1969)	Mina for You (1969)

I discorsi is a studio album by Italian singer Mina, released in 1969 by PDU and distributed by EMI Italiana.

This album is almost identical to previous Le più belle canzoni italiane interpretate da Mina, published the year before and given as a present to readers of some Italian magazines of Rusconi Group. In this album, the tracks "E se domani" and "La musica è finita" were replaced by the songs "I discorsi" and "La canzone di Marinella".

== Track listing ==
Side A
No.	Title	Writer(s)	Length
1.	"I discorsi"	Augusto Martelli; Mina	3:05
2.	"Se stasera sono qui"	Luigi Tenco; Mogol	3:59
3.	"Silenzioso slow"	Giovanni D'Anzi; Alfredo Bracchi	2:57
4.	"Non ti scordar di me"	Ernesto De Curtis; Domenico Furnò; Ernst Marischka	2:23
5.	"Canzone per te"	Sergio Endrigo; Sergio Bardotti	3:38
6.	"Io che amo solo te"	Endrigo	3:11
Total length:			19:03

Side B
No.	Title	Writer(s)	Length
1.	"La canzone di Marinella"	Fabrizio De André; Elvio Monti	3:15
2.	"Roma nun fa' la stupida stasera"	Armando Trovajoli; Pietro Garinei; Sandro Giovannini	2:29
3.	"Ma l'amore no"	D'Anzi; Michele Galdieri	3:34
4.	"Il cielo in una stanza"	Gino Paoli; Mogol	2:29
5.	"Munastero 'e santa Chiara"	Galdieri; Alberto Barberis	2:34
6.	"'O sole mio"	Eduardo Di Capua; Giovanni Capurro	3:44
Total length:			18:05

== Personnel ==
- Mina – vocals
- Augusto Martelli – arrangement, conducting

Credits are adapted from the album's liner notes.

== Charts ==
=== Weekly charts ===
Weekly chart performance for I discorsi
Chart (1969)	Peak position
Italian Albums (Musica e dischi)	1

=== Monthly charts ===
Monthly chart performance for I discorsi
Chart (1969)	Peak position
Italian Albums (Musica e dischi)	1
