= Napoli secondo estratto =

Studio album by Mina
- Released: 14 November 2003
- Recorded: 2003
- Studio: Studio Gianni Donzelli
- Genre: Canzone napoletana
- Length: 53:09
- Language: Neapolitan
- Label: PDU
- Producer: Massimiliano Pani

Mina chronology
In duo (2003)	Napoli secondo estratto (2003)	The Platinum Collection (2004)

Napoli secondo estratto is a studio album by Italian singer Mina, released on 14 November 2003 by PDU and distributed by Sony.

== Overview ==
The album is a direct continuation of the 1996 album Napoli, which is also filled with covers of Neapolitan songs. This time the singer interprets the Neapolitan classics through mainly orchestral arrangements, giving the impression that the listener is in the theater hall.

The album design, as always, was done by Mauro Baletti, the singer lost the album cover to three real Neapolitans, Totò, Tina Pica and Titina De Filippo, they are sitting on the balcony of the opera house waiting for the performance, and Mina herself can only be found in the booklet, she looks out from behind the scenes.

== Critical reception ==
Paola Maraone from Rockol stated that Mina "remains the only non-Neapolitan singer who can play Parthenopean classics without looking ridiculous" and noted her "soulful performance".

== Track listing ==
No.	Title	Lyrics	Music	Length
1.	"Tu ca nun chiagne!"	Ernesto De Curtis	Libero Bovio	3:34
2.	"O cielo ce manna sti' ccose"	Armando Trovajoli	Fred Bongusto	5:42
3.	"Te voglio bene assaje"	Alessandro Longo	Roberto Sacco	4:16
4.	"Carmela"	Sergio Bruni	Salvatore Palomba	2:12
5.	"Napule è"	Pino Daniele	Daniele	5:09
6.	"Maria Mari'!..."	Eduardo Di Capua	Vincenzo Russo	3:08
7.	"'O sole mio"	Di Capua	Giovanni Capurro	3:12
8.	"Canzona appassiunata"	E. A. Mario	Mario	3:34
9.	"Era de maggio"	Mario Pasquale Costa	Salvatore Di Giacomo	5:21
10.	"Guapparia"	Rodolfo Falvo	Libero Bovio	3:09
11.	"I' te vurria vasa'!..."	Di Capua	Vincenzo Russo	5:51
12.	"Cu 'e mmane"	Giovanni Donzelli; Vincenzo Leomporro	Donzelli; Leomporro	4:13
13.	"'O cuntrario 'e l'ammore"	Maurizio Morante	Gianni Ferrio	3:44
Total length:				53:09

== Personnel ==
- Mina – vocals
- Andrea Braido – acoustic guitar, electric guitar
- Gianni Ferrio – arrangement, conducting
- Massimiliano Pani – arrangement (12), production
- Nicolò Fragile – arrangement (12), programming (12)
- Alessandro Ciervo – backing vocals (5)
- Alessio Donzelli – backing vocals (5)
- Benedetta Pollio – backing vocals (5)
- Daniela Minopoli – backing vocals (5)
- Erika Infantocci – backing vocals (5)
- Giuliana Di Girolamo – backing vocals (5)
- Luca Ciervo – backing vocals (5)
- Pina Pollio – backing vocals (5)
- Veronica Flocco – backing vocals (5)
- Massimo Moriconi – bass, double bass
- Gabriele Mirabassi – clarinet
- Shiho Ferrari – contrabass
- Alfredo Golino – drums, percussion
- Bruno Grossi – flute
- Giorgio Cocilovo – guitar (12)
- Georges Alvarez – horn
- Giorgio Secco – mandolin (6)
- Alessandro Cutolo – mastering
- Ignazio Morviducci – mastering, mixing, recording
- Danilo Rea – piano, organ
- Alba Arnova – production (6), creative direction (6)
- Ilaria Negrotti – viola
- Ivan Vukcevic – viola
- Monica Benda – viola
- Anthony Flint – first violin
- Alessandro Milani – violin
- Andreas Laake – violin
- Barbara Ciannamea Monte Rizzi – violin
- Klaidi Sahatci – violin
- Piotr Nikiroff – violin
- Susanne Holm – violin
- Walter Zagato – violin
- Yoko Paetsch – violin
- Claude Hauri – violoncello
- Jennifer Flint – violoncello
- Johann Sebastian Paetsch – violoncello

Credits are adapted from the album's liner notes.

== Charts ==
=== Weekly charts ===
Weekly chart performance for Napoli secondo estratto
Chart (2003)	Peak position
Italian Albums (FIMI)	8

=== Year-end charts ===
Year-end chart performance for Napoli secondo estratto
Chart (2003)	Position
Italian Albums (FIMI)	32
