= Mina canta o Brasil =

Studio album by Mina
- Released: 1970
- Recorded: 1970
- Studio: La Basilica, Milan
- Genre: Pop; Tropicália; bossa nova
- Length: 35:07
- Language: Portuguese
- Label: PDU
- Producer: Bob Mitchell

Mina chronology
...bugiardo più che mai... più incosciente che mai... (1969)	Mina canta o Brasil (1970)	...quando tu mi spiavi in cima a un batticuore... (1970)

Mina canta o Brasil is a studio album by Italian singer Mina, released in 1970 by PDU. The album, inspired by Brazilian culture, is completely recorded in Portuguese (this is the singer's second album after Mina for You, which is recorded only in a foreign language).

== Overview ==
Seven songs of this album had been previously recorded by Mina in Italian: "Canto de ossanha" (with the title "Chi dice non dà", on Mina alla Bussola dal vivo); "Upa neguinho" ("Allegria", on Mina alla Bussola dal vivo); "Que maravilha" ("Che meraviglia", on Quando tu mi spiavi in cima a un batticuore); "A banda" ("La banda", on Sabato sera – Studio Uno '67); "Tem mais samba" ("C'è più samba", on Mina alla Bussola dal vivo); "A praça" ("Dai dai domani", B side to the "Non credere" single); "Nem vem que não tem" ("Sacumdì sacumdà", on Canzonissima '68).

== Critical reception ==
Claudio Milano of OndaRock reviewed the album positively, stating that it is "a really good album with great 'Todas Mulheres Do Mundo' and 'Cancao Latina', but there is nothing superfluous here, from more festive episodes (the reworked version of 'La banda' is really wonderful) to more melancholic." In 2018, Rolling Stone magazine placed it on the first place in the list of the most underrated albums of Mina. The reviewer stated that "it is impossible to remain cold in front of this free, sensual and feminine collection of eleven tracks borrowed from the Brazilian cradle." Optimagazine magazine wrote that this is "an exquisite album where Mina's sensual voice manages to rethink the works of Brazilian musical culture without sounding forced and completely immersed in the tropical atmosphere."

== Track listing ==
Side A
No.	Title	Writer(s)	Length
1.	"Canto de Ossanha"	Vinícius de Moraes; Baden Powell de Aquino	2:39
2.	"Com açúcar, com afeto"	Chico Buarque de Hollanda	4:21
3.	"Upa neguinho"	Edu Lobo; Gianfrancesco Guarnieri	2:08
4.	"Todas as mulheres do mundo"	Erasmo Carlos	2:57
5.	"Que maravilha"	Jorge Ben Jor; Toquinho	2:31
6.	"A banda"	De Hollanda	2:30
Total length:			17:06

Side B
No.	Title	Writer(s)	Length
1.	"Canção latina"	Olmir Stocker; Vítor Martins	2:59
2.	"Tem mais samba"	De Hollanda	3:27
3.	"Sentado à beira do caminho"	Roberto Carlos; Erasmo Carlos	6:00
4.	"A praça"	Carlos Imperial	3:01
5.	"Nem vem que não tem"	Imperial	2:34
Total length:			18:01
