= Lochness (album) =

Studio album by Mina
- Released: 29 October 1993
- Recorded: 1993
- Studio: Studi PDU, Lugano
- Genre: Pop; rock; jazz
- Length: 83:30
- Language: Italian; English; Spanish; French
- Label: PDU; EMI

Mina chronology
Mina canta i Beatles (1993)	Lochness (1993)	Mazzini canta Battisti (1994)

Lochness is a studio album by Italian singer Mina, released on 29 October 1993 by PDU in association with EMI. The album received positive reviews from critics, who noted the atmosphere and vocal abilities of Mina. It also topped the Italian albums chart.

== Track listing ==
Volume 1
No.	Title	Writer(s)	Length
1.	"Everything Happens to Me"	Tom Adair; Matt Dennis	5:35
2.	"Joana Francesa"	Chico Buarque de Hollanda	3:48
3.	"Body and Soul / Non so dir (ti voglio bene) / Nuages"	Johnny Green; Frank Eyton; Edward Heyman; Robert Sour / Pietro Garinei; Sandro Giovannini; Gorni Kramer / Django Reinhardt; Jacques Larue	5:58
4.	"Nostalgias"	Enrique Cadícamo; Juan Carlos Cobián	4:06
5.	"Parlami d'amore Mariù"	Ennio Neri; Cesare Andrea Bixio	2:00
6.	"Love Me"	Mike Stoller; Jerry Leiber	3:23
7.	"Adoro"	Armando Manzanero	4:35
8.	"Con il nastro rosa"	Mogol; Lucio Battisti	4:55
9.	"La notte (La nuit)"	Nicola Salerno; Salvatore Adamo	3:52
10.	"Teorema"	Herbert Pagani; Marco Ferradini	4:47
Total length:			43:02

Volume 2
No.	Title	Writer(s)	Length
1.	"Sì, l'amore"	Pomodoro; Massimiliano Pani	4:05
2.	"L'irriducibile"	Alberto De Martini; Pani	4:20
3.	"Stile libero"	Claudio Sanfilippo	3:02
4.	"Raso"	Giovanni Donzelli; Vincenzo Leomporro	4:30
5.	"Mille motivi"	Biagio Antonacci; Massimo Bozzi	4:36
6.	"Se avessi tempo"	Massimo Bizzarri; Riccardo Cocciante	4:14
7.	"Om mani peme hum"	Marcella Brizzi	4:57
8.	"Sì che non sei tu"	Donzelli; Leomporro	3:00
9.	"Ti accompagnerò"	Fabrizio Berlincioni; Mauro Culotta	4:42
10.	"Ninna pà"	Luca Raffaelli	2:57
Total length:			40:28

== Charts ==
Chart performance for Lochness
Chart (1993)	Peak position
European Albums (Music & Media)	29
Italian Albums (Musica e dischi)	1
