= Pappa di latte =

Studio album by Mina
- Released: 20 October 1995
- Recorded: 1995
- Studio: Studi PDU, Lugano
- Genre: Pop; rock; jazz
- Length: 92:12
- Language: Italian; English; Spanish
- Label: PDU

Mina chronology
Canarino mannaro (1994)	Pappa di latte (1995)	Canzoni d'autore (1996)

Pappa di latte is a double studio album by Italian singer Mina, released on 20 October 1995 by PDU. The album received mixed reviews from critics and reached number two on the Italian Albums chart.

In 2018, Rolling Stone magazine placed it on the seventh place in the list of the most underrated Mina's albums.

== Overview ==
Mina's previous album, Canarino mannaro, was said to be of a high standard of excellence, however Pappa di latte was not well received. It reached the lowest position on the year-end chart since Mina started singing. For this reason the album represented a break with the practice of the past 20 years in which Mina has consistently recorded a double album consisting of one disc of covers and one of unpublished material.

There have been a few positive reviews, however. Some speak of "hard sounds and manicured arrangements sought by the rich and good musicians, but too unbalanced" while other reviews were more scathing saying Mina should retire. This album was considered a moment of low creativity but some critics remarked that her vocal prowess saved some of the songs.

Mina becomes "exceptional" when she faces the Gershwin's "They Can't Take that Away from Me" or on the sparkling swing of "Chiedimi tutto" by Luttazzi and especially when she gives "one of those thrilling interpretations that leave a mark" with the track "Almeno tu nell'universo" by the late Mia Martini.

Some album reviews found the medley composed of "A Night in Tunisia / Penso positivo / Copacabana (At the Copa)" "curious" or "just to irritate [...] purists", Notably the interweaving of "The Captain of Her Heart" and "Every Breath You Take" by the group Police by adding "small but essential artistic brushstrokes" creates pure vocal and musical class.

On this album, Mina duets with her daughter, Benedetta Mazzini, on the remake of the track "More Than Words" by the group Extreme. Mina also duets with her son, Massimiliano Pani, on the track "If I Fell" by the Beatles blending their voices harmoniously.

Among the unusual selection of composers, the trio of songs written by Audio2 is interesting "Naufragati" and "Metti uno zero" "wallow between dance and rock without much conviction", while "Non c'è più audio" according to a review was "decent but nothing more". Other songs which received favourable reviews were "Per te che mi hai chiesto una canzone" written by Philip Trojani, who also duets with Mina on the track and the Italian-Neapolitan "Sulamente pe' parlà".

Massimiliano Pani is credited to writing two love songs "Se finisse tutto così" and "Torno venerdì". These are included among the unpublished tracks, but they have actually been recorded by Pani. "Se finisse tutto così" is from his album Storie per cani sciolti released with the original title Valentina Without You and "Torno venerdì" is from his debut album L'occasione.

The track "Timida" has a delicious bossanova rhythm and as a review put it "between Elvis and flavors of Brazil". The other track is "Di vista" which creates a "dark and rarefied atmosphere". The "dark and deformed" "Donna donna donna" written by, amongst others, Cocciante and arranged by Christian Cappellutti is a "dramatic song with very low tones".

== Track listing ==
Volume 1
No.	Title	Writer(s)	Length
1.	"A Night in Tunisia / Penso positivo / Copacabana (At the Copa)"	Frank Paparelli; Jon Hendricks; Dizzy Gillespie) / Jovanotti; Saturnino Celani / Barry Manilow; Jack Feldman; Bruce Sussman	5:52
2.	"Almeno tu nell'universo"	Bruno Lauzi; Maurizio Fabrizio	4:03
3.	"They Can't Take That Away from Me"	Ira Gershwin; George Gershwin	4:13
4.	"More Than Words" (featuring Benedetta Mazzini)	Nuno Bettencourt; Gary Cherone	3:52
5.	"Porque tu me acostumbraste"	Frank Domínguez	4:20
6.	"The Captain of Her Heart / Every Breath You Take"	Kurt Maloo; Felix Haug / Sting	5:08
7.	"Sincerely"	Harvey Fuqua; Alan Freed	4:04
8.	"When You Let Me Go"	Christian Cappelluti; Raf; Giancarlo Bigazzi; Beppe Dati	4:49
9.	"If I Fell" (featuring Massimiliano Pani)	John Lennon; Paul McCartney	2:35
10.	"Encadenados"	Carlos Arturo Briz	4:16
Total length:			43:15

Volume 2
No.	Title	Writer(s)	Length
1.	"Non c'è più audio"	Giovanni Donzelli; Vincenzo Leomporro	4:52
2.	"Naufragati" (featuring Audio 2)	Donzelli; Leomporro	4:16
3.	"Di vista"	Tullio Pizzorno	4:36
4.	"Donna donna donna"	Massimo Bizzarri; Pino Marcucci; Riccardo Cocciante	5:18
5.	"Per te che mi hai chiesto una canzone" (featuring Filippo Trojani)	Filippo Trojani; Massimiliano Pani	2:42
6.	"Chiedimi tutto"	Leo Chiosso; Lelio Luttazzi	3:26
7.	"Sulamente pe' parlà"	Stefania Dal Pino; Francesco Graziano Accinni; Vincenzo Micucci	4:11
8.	"Metti uno zero"	Donzelli; Leomporro	4:28
9.	"Se finisse tutto così"	Maurizio Morante; Pani	4:34
10.	"Torno venerdì"	Giorgio Calabrese; Pani	5:24
11.	"Timida"	Maria Enrica Andolfi	5:07
Total length:			48:57

== Personnel ==
- Mina – vocals
- Gabriele Comeglio – arrangement (1-1, 1-3, 1-7, 2-6)
- Massimiliano Pani – arrangement (1-5, 1-6, 1-8 to 1-10, 2-1 to 2-3, 2-5, 2-8 to 2-11), backing vocals, keyboard, vocals (1-9)
- Christian Cappelluti – arrangement (2-4), guitar, keyboard
- Mauro Santoro – arrangement (2-7), keyboard
- Massimo Moriconi – electric bass, double bass, fretless
- Riccardo Fioravanti – electric bass
- Sergio Farina – guitar
- Paolo Gianolio – guitar
- Massimo Varini – guitar
- Maurizio Dei Lazzaretti – drums
- Alfredo Golino – drums
- Christian Meyer – drums
- Armando Armando – percussion
- Candelo Cabezas – percussion
- Danilo Rea – piano
- Maurizio Giammarco – saxophone
- Michael Rosen – saxophone
- Franco Ambrosetti – trumpet
- Benedetta Mazzini – vocals (1-4)
- Audio2 – vocals (2-2)
- Filippo Trojani – vocals (2-5)
- Emanuela Cortesi – backing vocals
- Simonetta Robbiani – backing vocals

== Charts ==
Initial chart performance for Pappa di latte
Chart (1995)	Peak position
European Albums (Music & Media)	32
Italian Albums (Musica e dischi)	4
Italian Albums (FIMI)	2

2022 chart performance for Pappa di latte
Chart (2022)	Peak position
Italian Vinyl Albums (FIMI)	16
