= Dalla terra =

Studio album by Mina
- Released: 6 October 2000
- Recorded: 2000
- Studio: Studi GSU, Lugano, Switzerland; Forum Music Village, Rome, Italy
- Genre: Religious; classical
- Length: 49:17
- Language: Italian; Latin
- Label: PDU
- Producer: Massimiliano Pani

Mina chronology
Love Collection (2000)	Dalla terra (2000)	Sconcerto (2001)

Professional ratings
Review scores
Source	Rating
AllMusic	2.5/5 stars

Dalla terra is a studio album by Italian singer Mina, released on 6 October 2000 by PDU.

== Overview ==
This is the only album in Mina's discography that consist entirely of non-secular music. In album Dalla Terra, Anna Mazzini has made one of the few and first Italian arrangements, starting from some liturgical chants of the Christian tradition. For example, she made a version not for choral groups nor organo, of the Veni Creator Spiritus, without the last three stanzas of the original Latin text (regarding the power against the evil, and the knowledge of the Father God and His Son, beginning from the Holy Spirit God).

In 2018, Rolling Stone placed it on the 3rd place in the list of the most underrated albums of Mina.

== Track listing ==
1. Magnificat - 4:34 - (Marco Frisina. Lyrics based on "Gospel of Luke")
2. Voi ch'amate lo criatore - 3:40 - (from "Laudario di Cortona", 13th century)
3. Memorare - 4:32 - (Gianni Ferrio. Lyrics attributed to Bernard of Clairvaux (1090-1153))
4. Quando corpus morietur - 3:31 - (Giovanni Battista Pergolesi (1710-1736). From "Stabat Mater)
5. Omni die - 3:02 - (Anonymous writer, 12th century)
6. Quanno nascette ninno - 4:33 - (Alphonsus Maria de Liguori (1696-1787))
7. Nada te turbe - 4:50 - (Marco Frisina. Lyrics based on a text by Teresa of Ávila (1515-1582))
8. Veni creator spiritus - 3:12 - (Liturgical hymn of the feast of Pentecost)
9. Pianto della Madonna - 1:46 - (Claudio Monteverdi (1567-1643), from the collection of sacred music "Selva morale e spirituale" (1640))
10. Dulcis Christe - 3:00 - (Michelangiolo Grancini (1605-1669))
11. Qui presso a te - 4:54 - (Anonymous writer, 19th century)
12. Ave Maria - 3:58 - (Charles Gounod (1818-1893). Based on the "Prelude No. 1 in C major (BWV 846)" from "The Well-Tempered Clavier" by Johann Sebastian Bach (1685-1750))
- The hidden track Voi ch'amate lo criatore is found at the end of track 12 in CD editions of the album.

== Charts ==
Chart performance for Dalla terra
Chart (2000)	Peak position
European Albums (Music & Media)	33
Italian Albums (FIMI)	3
