= Dedicato a mio padre =

Studio album by Mina
- Released: December 1967
- Recorded: 14 December 1967
- Genre: Pop; jazz
- Length: 36:08
- Language: English; Italian; Spanish
- Label: PDU

Mina chronology
4 anni di successi (1967)	Dedicato a mio padre (1967)	Mina alla Bussola dal vivo (1968)

Dedicato a mio padre is a studio album by Italian singer Mina, released in 1967 by PDU and distributed by Durium.

== Overview ==
In December 1967 Mina and her father Giacomo Mazzini opened their own record label, PDU – Platten Durcharbeitung Ultraphone, in Lugano, Switzerland. The founding of the label answered Mina's requests for independent creativity from producers. One of the first releases on the label was Mina's album Dedicato a mio padre (English: Dedicated to my father).

== Critical reception ==
In 2018 Giorgio Moltisanti from Rolling Stone placed it on the 6th place in the list of Mina's most underrated albums. Moltisanti stated that this is actually the peak from an artistic point of view, which did not succeed in sales, comparing this result with Dusty in Memphis, which did not shine on the charts and was recognized only after a while.

== Track listing ==
Side A
No.	Title	Writer(s)	Length
1.	"Lazy River"	Hoagy Carmichael; Sidney Arodin	2:49
2.	"I Should Care"	Axel Stordahl; Paul Weston; Sammy Cahn	3:15
3.	"I discorsi"	Augusto Martelli; Mina	3:06
4.	"Somos"	Mario Clavell	2:29
5.	"La canzone di Marinella"	Fabrizio De André; Elvio Monti	3:11
6.	"The Man that Got Away"	George Gershwin; Harold Arlen	2:44
Total length:			17:34

Side B
No.	Title	Writer(s)	Length
1.	"That Old Feelin'"	Lew Brown; Sammy Fain	3:33
2.	"So (Preciso aprender a ser só)"	Marcos Valle; Paulo Sérgio Valle; Tania Bellanca	3:19
3.	"Sentimental Journey"	Ben Homer; Les Brown; Bud Green	2:50
4.	"Johnny Guitar"	Peggy Lee; Victor Young	2:41
5.	"Ma se ghe penso"	Attilio Margutti; Mario Cappello	3:31
6.	"Bésame Mucho"	Consuelo Velázquez	2:40
Total length:			18:34

== Personnel ==
- Mina – vocals
- Augusto Martelli – arrangement, conducting

Credits are adapted from the album's liner notes.

== Charts ==
Chart performance for Dedicato a mio padre
Chart (1967)	Peak position
Italian Albums (Musica e dischi)	5
