= Dilettevoli inedite eccedenze =

Compilation album by Mina
- Released: 9 October 2026
- Recorded: 1974–2026
- Genre: Pop
- Length: 33:59
- Languages: Italian; Sicilian; French; English
- Label: PDU
- Producer: Massimiliano Pani

Mina chronology
1963/1967 (2025)	Dilettevoli inedite eccedenze (2026)

Singles from Dilettevoli inedite eccedenze
- 1. "A costo di morire" Released: 2 March 2026; 2. "Vento di passione" Released: 18 September 2026

Dilettevoli inedite eccedenze is a compilation album by Mina, released on 9 October 2026 through PDU record label. The album became the third part in a series of archival releases by the singer, which included rare and previously unreleased "excesses" (eccedenze) of her many years of work, recorded between the 1970s and April 2026. The tracklist includes Mina's interpretations of famous compositions, such as the Beatles' "Eleanor Rigby" in a flamenco style, Pino Daniele's "Yes, I Know My Way," and "Settembre" by Ivano Fossati—the only song on the disc that is neither a cover nor rare archival material.

== Track list ==
No.	Title	Writer(s)	Length
1.	"A costo di morire"	Fabio Massimo Cantini; Franca Evangelisti	4:13
2.	"Vento di passione"	Pino Daniele	3:40
3.	"Settembre"	Ivano Fossati	3:18
4.	"Canzone triste"	Gianni Ferrio; Roberto Lerici	3:28
5.	"Carrettieri"	Alfonso Gibilaro	2:51
6.	"La mia serenata"	Gianni Boncompagni; Italo Nicola Greco; Jimmy Fontana; Mogol	3:51
7.	"Dans mon île"	Henri Salvador	3:00
8.	"Vierno"	Vincenzo Acampora; Armando De Gregorio	3:49
9.	"Yes I Know My Way"	Pino Daniele	3:01
10.	"Eleanor Rigby"	John Lennon; Paul McCartney	2:48
Total length:			33:59

== Charts ==
Chart performance for Dilettevoli inedite eccedenze
Chart (2026)	Peak position
Italian Albums (FIMI)	8
Italian Physical Albums (FIMI)	3
