= Todavía (album) =

Studio album by Mina
- Released: 21 September 2007
- Genre: Pop; rock; latin
- Length: 60:17
- Language: Spanish; Portuguese
- Label: PDU
- Producer: Massimiliano Pani

Mina chronology
Bau (2006)	Todavía (2007)	Sulla tua bocca lo dirò (2009)

Todavía is a studio album by Italian singer Mina, released on 21 September 2007 by PDU. The album features 13 songs in Spanish and one in Portuguese, and includes seven duets with Latin-American, Spanish and Italian stars.

== Track listing ==
No.	Title	Writer(s)	Length
1.	"Grande amor (Grande amore)"	Giulia Fasolino; Samuele Cerri	4:38
2.	"Vuela por mi vida (Volami nel cuore)"	Alberto Testa; Manrico Mologni; Gualtiero Malgoni; Mila Ortiz	3:29
3.	"Un año de amor (Un anno d'amore [C'est irréparable])" (duet with Diego el Cigala)	Nino Ferrer; Testa; Mogol; Pedro Almodóvar	4:46
4.	"Llévate ahora (Portati via)"	Stefano Borgia; Ortiz	3:56
5.	"Cuestión de feeling (Questione di feeling)" (duet with Tiziano Ferro)	Mogol; Riccardo Cocciante; Luis Gómez-Escolar	4:56
6.	"Corazón felino (Brivido felino)" (duet with Diego Torres)	Stefano Cenci; Paolo Audino; Ortiz	3:44
7.	"Uvas maduras (Succhiando l'uva)"	Zucchero Fornaciari; Matteo Saggese; Mino Vergnaghi; Ortiz	4:10
8.	"Valsinha" (duet with Chico Buarque)	Vinícius de Moraes; Chico Buarque de Hollanda	2:50
9.	"Nieve (Neve)"	Giovanni Donzelli; Vincenzo Leomporro; Ortiz	5:19
10.	"Agua y sal (Acqua e sale)" (duet with Miguel Bosé)	Donzelli; Leomporro; Cerri	4:44
11.	"No sè si eres tù (Sei o non sei)"	Valentino Alfano; Piero Cassano; Massimiliano Pani; Ortiz	3:48
12.	"Parole parole" (duet with Javier Zanetti)	Leo Chiosso; Giancarlo Del Re; Gianni Ferrio; Antonio Guijarro; Alfonso Alpin	4:06
13.	"Sin piedad" (duet with Joan Manuel Serrat)	Joan Manuel Serrat	5:11
14.	"¿Cómo estás? (Come stai?)"	Giorgio Calabrese; Pani; Claudia Ferrandi; Cerri	4:36
Total length:			60:17

== Personnel ==
- Mina – vocals (all tracks)
- Diego el Cigala – vocals (3)
- Tiziano Ferro – vocals (5)
- Diego Torres – vocals (6)
- Chico Buarque – vocals (8)
- Miguel Bosé – vocals (10)
- Javier Zanetti – vocals (12)
- Joan Manuel Serrat – vocals (13)
- Samuele Cerri – adapted lyrics (1, 10, 14)
- Mila Ortiz – adapted lyrics (2, 4, 6, 7, 9, 11)
- Pedro Almodóvar – adapted lyrics (3)
- Luis Gómez-Escolar – adapted lyrics (5)
- Antonio Guijarro – adapted lyrics (12)
- Alfonso Alpin – adapted lyrics (12)
- Nicolò Fragile – arrangement (1, 2, 6, 7, 9, 10, 11, 12)
- Massimiliano Pani – arrangement (4, 5, 6, 7, 9, 10, 11, 12, 14), background vocals
- Gianni Ferrio – arrangement (8, 12)
- Ugo Bongianni – arrangement (13)
- Jaime Calabuch Asensio – piano
- Faso – bass
- Sabú Juárez Escobar – bass
- Lorenzo Poli – bass
- Alfredo Golino – percussions
- Lele Melotti – percussions
- Giorgio Cocilovo – guitar
- Luca Meneghello – guitar
- Diego Moreno Jiménez – guitar
- Nicolò Fragile – Hammond organ
- Gabriele Comeglio – soprano saxophone
- Anthony Flynt – first violin
- Giulia Fasolino – background vocals
- Stefania Martin – background vocals

== Charts ==
=== Weekly charts ===
Weekly chart performance for Todavía
Chart (2007)	Peak position
Italian Albums (FIMI)	1
Spanish Albums (Promusicae)	36

=== Year-end charts ===
Year-end chart performance for Todavía
Chart (2007)	Position
Italian Albums (FIMI)	55

== Certifications and sales ==
Certifications for Todavía
Region	Certification	Certified units/sales
Italy (FIMI)	Platinum	80,000^{*}
^{*} Sales figures based on certification alone.
