= Via di qua =

Single by Mina and Fausto Leali

from the album Sì, buana
- Language: Italian
- B-side: "Cosa manca"
- Released: September 1986
- Recorded: 9 September 1986
- Studio: Studi PDU, Lugano
- Genre: Pop
- Length: 4:51
- Label: PDU
- Composer: Massimiliano Pani
- Lyricist: Giorgio Calabrese

Mina singles chronology
| "Questione di feeling" (1985) | "Via di qua" (1986) | "Tutti gli zeri del mondo" (2000) |

Fausto Leali singles chronology
| "Io, io senza te" (1984) | "Via di qua" (1986) | "Io amo" (1987) |

"Via di qua" (English: "Get out of here") is a song written by Massimiliano Pani and Giorgio Calabrese. It was recorded by Italian singers Mina and Fausto Leali for 1986 album Sì, buana. Released as a single, the song peaked at number eight on the Italian chart. "Via di qua" was also used as the opening theme for Enzo Dell'Aquila's program Trent'anni della nostra storia, dedicated to the history of RAI broadcasting company.

== Track listing ==
7" single
A. "Via di qua" – 4:51
B. "Cosa manca" (Adelio Cogliati, Piero Cassano, Massimiliano Pani) – 4:00

== Charts ==
Chart performance for "Via di qua"
| Chart (1986) | Peak position |
|---|---|
| Italy (Musica e dischi) | 8 |
