= Sulla terra io e lei =

Single by Riccardo Cocciante

from the album Sincerità
- B-side: "Di notte"
- Released: 1983
- Length: 4:18
- Label: Virgin
- Songwriter(s): Riccardo Cocciante; Mogol

Riccardo Cocciante singles chronology
"Sincerità" (1983)	"Sulla terra io e lei" (1983)	"Questione di feeling" (1985)

Audio
- "Sulla terra io e lei" on YouTube

"Sulla terra io e lei" ('On the earth me and her') is a 1983 Italian song by Riccardo Cocciante (music) and Mogol (lyrics), arranged by James Newton Howard and performed by Riccardo Cocciante.

== Overview ==
"Sulla terra io e lei" was the second and most successful single of the 1983 album Sincerità. The lyrics, described as "halfway between disconsolate and fatalistic tones", depict a man who painfully and regretfully remembers his lost love. The song has been praised for "the interesting harmonic structure,[...] the skillful handling of the strings,[...] and the immediate grip of the singing, which has in the prolongation of notes on the same syllable the dominant characteristic of the refrain".

Cocciante recorded the song in English as "Something's Gone from My Life", in French as " Sur la terre, elle et moi", and in Spanish as "Ella y Yo".

== Track listing ==
No.	Title	Writer(s)	Length
1.	"Sulla terra io e lei"	Cocciante, Mogol	4:18
2.	"Di notte"	Cocciante, Mogol	4:31

== Charts ==
Chart (1983)	Peak position
Italy (Musica e dischi)	13
