= Mina Celentano =

Studio album by Mina and Adriano Celentano
- Released: 14 May 1998
- Recorded: 1998
- Studio: Studi GSU, Lugano; Air Studio, Galbiate
- Genre: Pop
- Length: 45:16
- Language: Italian
- Label: Clan Celentano; PDU; RTI

Mina chronology
Leggera (1997)	Mina Celentano (1998)	Nostalgias (1998)

Adriano Celentano chronology
Arrivano gli uomini (1996)	Mina Celentano (1997)	Io non so parlar d'amore (1999)

Mina Celentano is a collaborative studio album by Italian singers Mina and Adriano Celentano, released on 14 May 1998 by Clan Celentano and PDU and distributed by RTI Music. It became one of the best-selling albums in Italy, with over 2 million copies sold.

== Overview ==
A special edition of the album, titled Mina Celentano – Buon Natale, was released during the Christmas season packaged with a CD-ROM titled "Molly e destino solitario" featuring an animated video of Che t'aggia di.

18 years later, in 2016, Mina and Celentano recorded a second collaborative album called Le Migliori ("the best ones", in reference to a quote by Celentano describing their collaboration).

Lucio Battisti was initially attached to the project but he eventually dropped out.

The album was recorded in Galbiate and Lugano and was produced by Massimiliano Pani.

The album spawned two singles, Acqua e sale and Brivido felino. Mina would later record Spanish versions of both songs with different male singers, respectively Miguel Bosé and Diego Torres).

== Track listing ==
No.	Title	Writer(s)	Length
1.	"Acqua e sale"	Giovanni Donzelli, Vincenzo Leomporro	4:42
2.	"Brivido felino"	Stefano Cenci, Paolo Audino	3:44
3.	"Io non volevo"	Adriano Celentano	4:08
4.	"Specchi riflessi"	Giovanni Donzelli, Vincenzo Leomporro	4:59
5.	"Dolce fuoco dell'amore"	Giulia Fasolino	4:39
6.	"Che t'aggia di'"	Adriano Celentano	5:09
7.	"Io ho te"	Giovanni Donzelli, Vincenzo Leomporro	4:54
8.	"Dolly"	Adriano Celentano, Marco Vaccaro	5:35
9.	"Sempre sempre sempre"	Luigi Albertelli, Enrico Riccardi	4:46
10.	"Messaggio d'amore"	Massimiliano Pani	2:36
Total length:			45:16

== Credits ==
- Adriano Celentano – vocals
- Mina – vocals
- Alfredo Golino – drums
- Maurizio Dei Lazzaretti – drums
- Paolo Gianolio – guitar
- Massimo Varini – guitar
- Giorgio Cocilovo – guitar
- Umberto Fiorentino – guitar
- Danilo Rea – piano, accordion
- Nicolò Fragile – keyboards
- Massimo Moriconi – bass
- Massimiliano Pani – keyboards

== Charts ==
=== Weekly charts ===
Initial weekly chart performance for Mina Celentano
Chart (1998)	Peak position
European Albums (Music & Media)	26
Italian Albums (FIMI-Nielsen)	1
Italian Albums (Musica e dischi)	1
Swiss Albums (Schweizer Hitparade)	39

2004 weekly chart performance for Mina Celentano
Chart (2004)	Peak position
Italian Albums (FIMI)	72

2010 weekly chart performance for Mina Celentano
Chart (2010)	Peak position
Italian Albums (FIMI)	93

2024 weekly chart performance for Mina Celentano
Chart (2024)	Peak position
Italian Albums (FIMI)	40
Italian Physical Albums (FIMI)	19

=== Year-end charts ===
Year-end chart performance for Mina Celentano
Chart (1998)	Position
European Albums (Music & Media)	57
Italian Albums (Musica e dischi)	1

== Certifications and sales ==
Certifications for Mina Celentano
Region	Certification	Certified units/sales
Italy (FIMI)	2× Diamond	2,000,000
Summaries
Europe (IFPI)	Platinum	1,000,000^{*}
^{*} Sales figures based on certification alone.

== See also ==
- List of best-selling albums in Italy
