= Sì, buana =

Studio album by Mina
- Released: October 1986
- Recorded: 1986
- Studio: Studi PDU, Lugano
- Genre: Pop
- Length: 90:11
- Language: Italian; English
- Label: PDU
- Producer: Massimiliano Pani

Mina chronology
Finalmente ho conosciuto il conte Dracula... (1985)	Sì, buana (1986)	Del mio meglio n. 9 (1987)

Singles from Sì, buana
- 1. "Via di qua" Released: September 1986

Sì, buana is a studio album by Italian singer Mina, released in October 1986, by PDU.

With this album, the singer continued her collaboration with Paolo Fayese's program "Thirty Years of Our History" (30 anni della nostra storia) about the history of RAI broadcasting company. Initially, the album was released on vinyl, CDs and cassettes, and it was sold both as a double album and in separate parts.

The album took the first place in the Italian album chart, and its sales exceeded the mark of 240,0000 copies.

== Track listing ==
Volume 1
No.	Title	Lyrics	Music	Length
1.	"Bella senz'anima" (with Riccardo Cocciante)	Paolo Cassella	Riccardo Cocciante; Marco Luberti	4:40
2.	"Che male fa"	Piero Cassano; Aldo Stellita; Carlo Marrale	Cassano; Stellita; Marrale	4:20
3.	"Ancora"	Franco Migliacci	Claudio Mattone	4:22
4.	"Questo piccolo grande amore"	Claudio Baglioni	Baglioni; Antonio Coggio	5:20
5.	"Grease"	Barry Gibb	Gibb	3:20
6.	"E tu come stai?"	Baglioni	Baglioni	5:09
7.	"Venus"	Robbie van Leeuwen	Leeuwen	3:49
8.	"Buonasera dottore" (with Francesco Donatelli)	Paolo Limiti	Shel Shapiro	4:30
9.	"Io domani"	Giancarlo Bigazzi	Gianni Bella	4:40
10.	"Azzurro"	Vito Pallavicini	Paolo Conte	4:02
Total length:				44:55

Volume 2
No.	Title	Lyrics	Music	Length
1.	"Un cucchiaino di zucchero nel thè"	Gianfranco Manfredi	Ricky Gianco	3:19
2.	"Via di qua" (with Fausto Leali)	Giorgio Calabrese	Massimiliano Pani	4:51
3.	"Semplicemente tua"	Ugo Nicolicchia	Sandro Gelmetti	5:03
4.	"Sotto il sole dell'Avana"	Adelio Cogliati; Claudia Ferrandi	Piero Cassano	3:52
5.	"Ritratto in bianco e nero (Retrato em branco e preto)"	Calabrese	Antônio Carlos Jobim	5:30
6.	"Cosa manca"	Adelio Cogliati	Piero Cassano; Pani	4:00
7.	"Domande"	Riccardo Borghetti	Franco Serafini	4:28
8.	"L'altra metà di me"	Piergiorgio Benda	Benda	3:19
9.	"Ogni tanto è bello stare soli"	Andrea Mingardi	Mingardi	4:43
10.	"Pomeriggio sonnolento"	Calabrese	Randy Jackson	3:25
11.	"Secondo me"	Calabrese	Cocciante	2:07
Total length:				45:16

== Personnel ==
- Mina – vocals, background vocals
- Aldo Banfi – synthesizer
- Danilo Rea – piano, Rhodes piano
- Gigi Cappellotto – bass guitar
- Ellade Bandini – drums
- Renè Mantegna – percussion
- Massimiliano Pani – guitar, background vocals
- Piergiorgio Benda – electronic keyboard, piano
- Massimo Moriconi – bass guitar
- George Aghedo – percussion
- Walter Scebran – drums
- Giovanni Tommaso – bass guitar
- Renato Sellani – piano
- Mario Robbiani – electronic keyboard, background vocals
- Paolo Gianolio – guitar, programming, bass guitar, synthesizer
- Angel "Pato" Garcia – guitar
- Fernando Brusco – trumpet
- Gustavo Bregoli – trumpet
- Moreno Fassi – trombone
- Piero Cassano – background vocals
- Franco Serafini – background vocals
- Gianni Farè – background vocals
- Andy Surdi – background vocals
- Sam Jordan – background vocals

== Charts ==
Chart performance for Sì, buana
Chart (1986–87)	Peak position
Italian Albums (Billboard)	4
Italian Albums (Musica e dischi)	1
