= Mina alla Bussola dal vivo =

First live album by Italian singer Mina

Live album by Mina
- Released: 2 May 1968
- Recorded: 14 April 1968
- Venues: Bussola di Viareggio, Tuscany
- Genres: Pop; jazz
- Length: 32:48
- Languages: Italian; English
- Label: PDU

Mina chronology
Dedicato a mio padre (1967)	Mina alla Bussola dal vivo (1968)	Le più belle canzoni italiane interpretate da Mina (1968)

Mina alla Bussola dal vivo is the first live album by Italian singer Mina, released by PDU and distributed by Durium. Mina was the first Italian woman to record a live album during her performance at the Bussola, a popular night club in Marina di Pietrasanta, Versilia, Tuscany, Italy. She recorded this live in occasion of tenth year of her smashing career.

== Track listing ==
Side A
No.	Title	Writer(s)	Length
1.	"Chi dice non dà (Canto de Ossanha)"	Vinícius de Moraes; Baden Powell de Aquino; Giorgio Calabrese	2:42
2.	"Regolarmente"	Gianfranco Baldazzi; Daniela Casa	2:50
3.	"Cry"	Churchill Kohlman	3:31
4.	"Un colpo al cuore"	Giancarlo Bigazzi; Mario Capuano	3:26
5.	"Se stasera sono qui"	Luigi Tenco; Mogol	3:59
Total length:			16:28

Side B
No.	Title	Writer(s)	Length
1.	"C'è più samba (Tem mais samba)"	Chico Buarque de Hollanda; Bruno Lauzi	3:32
2.	"La voce del silenzio"	Mogol; Paolo Limiti; Elio Isola	3:28
3.	"Per ricominciare (Can't Take My Eyes Off You)"	Bob Gaudio; Bob Crewe; Ermanno Parazzini	3:30
4.	"Allegria (Upa neguinho)"	Lobo; Gianfrancesco Guarnieri; Calabrese	2:11
5.	"Deborah"	Paolo Conte; Vito Pallavicini	3:39
Total length:			16:20

== Personnel ==
- Mina – vocals
- Glauco Masetti – alto saxophone
- Sergio Rigon – alto saxophone, bass clarinet, flute
- Sergio Valenti – alto saxophone, baritone saxophone
- Augusto Martelli – arrangement, conducting
- Pino Presti – bass guitar
- Rolando Ceragioli – drums
- Filippo Daccò – electric guitar
- Ernesto Massimo Verardi – electric guitar
- Gianni Zilioli – flute piano, piccolo
- Alberto Baldan Bembo – organ
- Loreto Ficorilli – percussion
- Gianni Bedori – piano
- Eraldo Volonté – tenor saxophone, clarinet
- Gianni Caranti – trombone
- Nicola Castriotta – trombone
- Enos Patracchini – trombone
- Dino Piana – trombone
- Alberto Corvini – trumpet
- Fermo Lini – trumpet
- Oscar Valdambrini – trumpet
- Nuccio Rinaldis – sound engineer

== Charts ==
=== Weekly charts ===
Weekly сhart performance for Mina alla Bussola dal vivo
Chart (1968)	Peak position
Italian Albums (Musica e dischi)	1

=== Monthly charts ===
Monthly chart performance for Mina alla Bussola dal vivo
Chart (1968)	Peak position
Italian Albums (Musica e dischi)	1

=== Year-end charts ===
Year-end chart performance for Mina alla Bussola dal vivo
Chart (1968)	Position
Italian Albums (Musica e dischi)	1
