= Finalmente ho conosciuto il conte Dracula... =

Studio album by Mina
- Released: October 1985
- Recorded: 1985
- Studio: Studi PDU, Lugano
- Genre: Pop; rock
- Length: 84:06
- Language: Italian; English
- Label: PDU

Mina chronology
Del mio meglio n. 8 (1985)	Finalmente ho conosciuto il conte Dracula... (1985)	Sì, buana (1986)

Singles from Finalmente ho conosciuto il conte Dracula...
- 1. "Questione di feeling" Released: October 1985

Finalmente ho conosciuto il conte Dracula... is a double studio album by Italian singer Mina, released in October 1985 by PDU and distributed by EMI Italiana.

== Overview ==
The record continues Mina's collaboration with Paolo Frajese's program Trent'anni della nostra storia (Thirty Years of Our History) about the history of RAI broadcasting company. For this album, the singer recorded cover versions of famous songs from the 1970s, both foreign and Italian. All of them are placed in the first volume of the album. According to tradition, the second volume of the album includes only new songs.

For the album, Mina recorded a duet with Riccardo Cocciante called "Questione di feeling". The song was released as a single and became number two on the Italian chart. It was also used as the theme song of the Mike Bongiorno's TV show Pentatlon. The song was also later recorded by Mina in 2007 in Spanish as a duet with Tiziano Ferro for the album Todavía. The song "Eppur mi son scordato di te" was first sung live as part of a medley with Lucio Battisti in 1972 for the show Teatro 10.

For the first time, the album was released simultaneously on vinyl, CDs and cassettes, and both "Vol. 1" + "Vol. 2" editions and individual parts of the album were sold. In the Italian album chart, Finalmente ho conosciuto il conte Dracula... reached the second position, in total, it spent seventeen weeks on the chart. In Argentina, the album was released as Finalmente ru conocido al conde Dracula... and with a different cover (only the first volume of the album was contained), the album was also released in Greece and Switzerland.

== Critical reception ==
Gino Castaldo from La Repubblica noted that Mina is an "excellent interpreter of classics" and "nothing can resist her talent to transform even average songs into masterpieces." He also praised the new material and suggested that Mina returns to the game with fashionable trends and a more commercial product.

In 2015, the magazine Panorama named Finalmente ho conosciuto il conte Dracula... one of the ten essential albums by Mina. In 2018, Rolling Stone magazine placed it on the 8th place in the list of Mina's most underrated albums. The reviewer noted that a sublime and ever-changing Mina can be found here, and thanks to the gloomy atmosphere, he called it the twilight zone of her discography.

== Track listing ==
=== Volume 1 ===
Side A
No.	Title	Writer(s)	Length
1.	"Just the Way You Are"	Billy Joel	5:28
2.	"You're So Vain"	Carly Simon	4:55
3.	"Killing Me Softly with His Song"	Norman Gimbel; Charles Fox	4:16
4.	"Eloise"	Paul Ryan; Giuseppe Cassia	5:54

Side B
No.	Title	Writer(s)	Length
1.	"My Sharona"	Doug Fieger; Berton Averre	4:07
2.	"Poster"	Claudio Baglioni; Antonio Coggio	4:50
3.	"If You Leave Me Now"	Peter Cetera	3:31
4.	"How Deep Is Your Love"	Barry Gibb; Robin Gibb; Maurice Gibb	4:24
5.	"Eppur mi son scordato di te"	Mogol; Lucio Battisti	3:30

=== Volume 2 ===
Side C
No.	Title	Writer(s)	Length
1.	"You Are My Love"	Marisa Terzi	3:51
2.	"Mi mandi rose (Todo prosa)"	Antônio Gilson Porfírio "Agepê"; Antônio José Feitosa "Canário"; Cristiano Malgioglio	4:00
3.	"Senza umanità"	Anselmo Genovese	4:30
4.	"Dopo il cielo"	Vittorio De Scalzi	3:55
5.	"Nei miei occhi"	Riccardo Borghetti; Franco Serafini	5:23

Side D
No.	Title	Writer(s)	Length
1.	"Spara"	Massimiliano Pani; Vittorio De Scalzi; Beppe Quirici	5:05
2.	"C'aggio a ffà"	Pani, Angelo Sotgiu	4:27
3.	"Questione di feeling"	Mogol; Riccardo Cocciante	4:15
4.	"In autostrada"	Renato Arrouh	4:17
5.	"Mio di chi"	Aldo Donati; Pasquale Panella; Roberto Fia	3:28

== Personnel ==
- Mina – vocals, backing vocals
- Massimiliano Pani – arrangement (A1–B5), backing vocals, guitar (C1–D5)
- Mario Robbiani – arrangement (A1–B5), keyboards
- Vince Roll – arrangement (C1–C4, D5)
- Giovanni Tommaso – arrangement (C5-D2, D4), bass guitar
- Riccardo Cocciante – arrangement (D3), vocals (D3)
- Paul Buckmaster – arrangement (D3)
- Andy Surdi – backing vocals (A1–B5)
- Piero Cassano – backing vocals (A1–B5)
- Sam Trevino – backing vocals (A1–B5)
- Samuele Cerri – backing vocals (A1–B5)
- Ellade Bandini – drums (A1–B5), percussion (A1–B5)
- Walter Scebran – drums (A1–B5), percussion (A1–B5)
- Claudio Bazzari – guitar (A1–B5)
- Giorgio Cocilovo – guitar (C1–D5)
- Paolo Gianolio – guitar (C1–D5)
- Marco Rinalduzzi – guitar, synthesizer (C1–D5)
- Bruno De Filippi – harmonica (C1–D5)
- Danilo Rea – keyboards (A1–B5)
- Riccardo Biseo – keyboards (C1–D5)
- Roberto Zanaboni – keyboards
- Nuccio Rinaldis – recording, mixing
- Gustavo Bregoli – trumpet
- Demo Morselli – trumpet
- Moreno Fassi – trombone

Credits are adapted from the album's liner notes.

== Charts ==
Chart performance for Finalmente ho conosciuto il conte Dracula...
Chart (1985)	Peak position
Italian Albums (Billboard)	5
Italian Albums (Musica e dischi)	2
