= Canarino mannaro =

Studio album by Mina
- Released: 21 October 1994
- Recorded: 1994
- Studio: Studi PDU, Lugano; Wolfi Studio, Le Rughe, Rome
- Genre: Pop; rock; jazz; blues
- Length: 99:48
- Language: Italian; English; Neapolitan
- Label: PDU

Mina chronology
Mazzini canta Battisti (1994)	Canarino mannaro (1994)	Pappa di latte (1995)

Canarino mannaro is a double studio album by Italian singer Mina, released on 21 October 1994 by PDU. The album debuted from the first position in the Italian albums chart, and a month later its sales exceeded the threshold of 260,000 copies.

== Track listing ==
Volume 1
No.	Title	Writer(s)	Length
1.	"Che m'importa del mondo"	Franco Migliacci; Luis Bacalov	3:55
2.	"Va bene, va bene così"	Vasco Rossi; Roberto Casini; Domenico Camporeale	5:30
3.	"Wave"	Antônio Carlos Jobim	5:07
4.	"Oro / La canzone del sole" (feat. Audio 2)	Mogol; Giuseppe Mango / Mogol; Lucio Battisti	6:03
5.	"Il posto mio"	Alberto Testa; Tony Renis	5:29
6.	"Je so' pazzo"	Pino Daniele	3:43
7.	"Na voce 'na chitarra (e 'o poco 'e luna)"	Ugo Calise; Carlo Alberto Rossi	4:37
8.	"Crazy"	Willie Nelson	5:46
9.	"Rosso"	Gianni Boncompagni; Giancarlo Magalli; Franco Bracardi	4:29
10.	"Come Together"	John Lennon; Paul McCartney	7:42
Total length:			52:25

Volume 2
No.	Title	Writer(s)	Length
1.	"Noi" (feat. Massimo Lopez)	Mauro Santoro	5:27
2.	"Fosse vero"	Alberto De Martini; Massimiliano Pani	4:23
3.	"Rotola la vita" (feat. Audio 2)	Giovanni Donzelli; Vincenzo Leomporro	4:48
4.	"Tu dimmi che città"	De Martini; Tippete; Pani	4:05
5.	"Non è niente"	Donzelli; Leomporro	5:02
6.	"Amore" (feat. Riccardo Cocciante)	Maurizio Monti; Cocciante	5:20
7.	"In onda"	Gianfranco Salvatore; Lello Panico	4:41
8.	"Tornerai qui da me"	Samuele Cerri; Pani	4:59
9.	"Continuando"	Giovanni Di Gennaro	4:23
10.	"Impagliatori d'aquile"	Cerri	4:12
Total length:			47:23

== Charts ==
Chart performance for Canarino mannaro
Chart (1994)	Peak position
European Albums (Music & Media)	30
Italian Albums (Musica e dischi)	1
