= Roma nun fa' la stupida stasera =

1962 Italian song

"Roma nun fa' la stupida stasera" (lit. "Rome don't be stupid tonight") is a 1962 Italian song composed by Armando Trovajoli (music) and Garinei & Giovannini (lyrics).

Originally part of the musical comedy Rugantino, starring Nino Manfredi and Lea Massari, in which it was performed at the end of the first act, it became a classic of Italian and particularly roman music. The song has been described as a song "of undisputed appeal" thanks to "the richness of the jazzy harmonisation, which creates an evocative and suave atmosphere typical of lounge songs".

The song was later covered by numerous artists, including Mina, Ornella Vanoni, Milva, Andrea Bocelli, Claudio Villa, Renato Rascel, Johnny Dorelli, Toquinho, Bobby Solo, Josh Groban, Bruno Martino, Fausto Papetti, Nini Rosso, Jula De Palma, Kenny Clarke/Francy Boland Big Band, Vianella, Fred Bongusto, Lisa Ono, Lando Fiorini, Aldo Donati, Robertino, Narciso Parigi and Rino Salviati.
