= Olio (Mina album) =

Studio album by Mina
- Released: 15 April 1999
- Recorded: 1999
- Studio: Studi GSU, Lugano
- Genre: Pop; rock
- Length: 45:13
- Language: Italian; English; Neapolitan
- Label: PDU
- Producer: Massimiliano Pani

Mina chronology
| Mina Gold 2 (1999) | Olio (1999) | Mina n° 0 (2000) |

Olio is a studio album by Italian singer Mina, released on 15 April 1999 by PDU and distributed by RTI Music.

The album includes a bilingual version of the Shakespears Sister's song "Stay", sung as a duet with Piero Pelù. Another notable track is "Canto largo" which has been used as the opening theme of the long-running Italian soap opera Vivere.

== Track listing ==
| No. | Title | Writer(s) | Length |
|---|---|---|---|
| 1. | "Grande amore" | Giulia Fasolino | 4:37 |
| 2. | "Dint' 'o viento" | Pasquale Ziccardi; Ferdinando Ghidelli | 4:18 |
| 3. | "Come gocce" | Francesco Garzone; Luigi Pignalosa; Vincenzo Capasso | 5:13 |
| 4. | "Canto largo" | Samuele Cerri; Massimiliano Pani | 3:12 |
| 5. | "Non passa" | Fabrizio Berlincioni; Mauro Culotta | 5:07 |
| 6. | "Stay with Me (Stay)" (featuring Piero Pelù) | Siobhan Fahey; Marcella Detroit; Jean Guiot; Maurizio Morante | 4:13 |
| 7. | "Io voglio solo te" | Giulia Fasolino | 4:43 |
| 8. | "Lacreme e voce" | Marcello Schena; Nicolò Fragile; Morante | 4:47 |
| 9. | "Il meccanismo" | Morante | 3:45 |
| 10. | "E mi manchi" | Mauro Santoro | 5:16 |
| Total length: | | | 45:13 |

== Personnel ==
- Mina – vocal
- Massimiliano Pani – arrangement (1–7, 9, 10), backing vocals (3, 5–7, 10)
- Giulia Fasolino – backing vocals (3, 5–7)
- Moreno Ferrara – backing vocals (3, 5, 7)
- Manù Cortesi – backing vocals (3, 6, 7)
- Massimo Moriconi – double bass
- Alfredo Golino – drums (3, 5–8)
- Giorgio Secco – electric guitar (3, 10)
- Massimo Varini – guitar (1, 6)
- Paolo Gianolio – guitar (3–7, 9)
- Nicolò Fragile – keyboards, programming (1, 3, 5–7, 9, 10)
- Danilo Rea – piano (2–4, 6, 9)
- Gian Luca Ambrosetti – soprano saxophone
- Carmine Di – sound engineering, recording, mixing

Credits are adapted from the album's liner notes.

== Charts ==
Initial chart performance for Olio
| Chart (1999) | Peak position |
|---|---|
| European Albums (Music & Media) | 26 |
| Italian Albums (Musica e dischi/FIMI) | 1 |

2016 chart performance for Olio
| Chart (2016) | Peak position |
|---|---|
| Italian Vinyl Albums (FIMI) | 18 |

== Certifications and sales ==
Certifications for Olio
| Region | Certification | Certified units/sales |
|---|---|---|
| Italy (FIMI) | 2× Platinum | 200,000^{*} |
^{*} Sales figures based on certification alone.
