= Mina per Wind =

EP by Mina
- Released: June 2000
- Recorded: at PDU studios in Lugano
- Length: 18 min : 03 s
- Label: PDU
- Producer: Massimiliano Pani

Mina per Wind is an EP by Italian singer Mina.

== Content ==
The album contains four songs, all with the word "wind" in the title. The album was recorded in 2000 as part of a special offer of Italian-based "Wind Telecommunications" which consisted of a package including a phone card and this album.

- "The Wind Cries Mary" is a cover of the rock ballad by the Jimi Hendrix Experience and written by Jimi Hendrix.
- "Blowin' in the Wind" is a cover of the song written by Bob Dylan in 1962 and released on his album The Freewheelin' Bob Dylan in 1963.
- "Ride Like the Wind" is a cover of a song by American singer-songwriter Christopher Cross.
- "Gone with the Wind" is a cover of a popular song written by Allie Wrubel and Herb Magidson in 1937 and sung by Horace Heidt.

== Track listing ==
No.	Title	Writer(s)	Length
1.	"The Wind Cries Mary"	Jimi Hendrix	3:55
2.	"Gone with the Wind"	Herbert Magidson, Allie Wrubel	4:48
3.	"Blowin' in the Wind"	Bob Dylan	4:31
4.	"Ride Like the Wind"	Christopher Cross	4:48

== Musicians ==
- Mina Mazzini – Vocals and background vocals
- Massimiliano Pani – Keyboards
- Nicolò Fragile – Keyboards and piano
- Gianni Ferrio – Strings
- Giorgio Cocilovo – Acoustic guitar, electric guitar
- Massimo Moriconi – Bass, contrabass
- Alfredo Golino – Drums
- Andrea Braido – Electric guitar
- Gabriele Comeglio – Saxophone, wind instruments
- Mauro Parodi – Trombone
- Emilio Soana – Trumpet
