= Questione di feeling =

Single by Mina and Riccardo Cocciante

from the album Finalmente ho conosciuto il conte Dracula... and Il mare dei papaveri
- Language: Italian
- Released: October 1985
- Recorded: 1985
- Studio: Chipping Norton, England
- Genre: Pop
- Length: 4:12
- Label: Virgin
- Composer: Riccardo Cocciante
- Lyricist: Mogol
- Producers: Paul Buckmaster; Riccardo Cocciante

Mina singles chronology
"Comincia tu" (1984)	"Questione di feeling" (1985)	"Via di qua" (1986)

Riccardo Cocciante singles chronology
"Sulla terra io e lei" (1983)	"Questione di feeling" (1985)	"L'onda" (1986)

Audio
- "Questione di feeling" on YouTube

"Questione di feeling" is a duet song recorded by Italian singers Mina and Riccardo Cocciante. The song was released as a single and anticipated Mina's album Finalmente ho conosciuto il conte Dracula... in which it is contained. Cocciante puts the track on his album Il mare dei papaveri (1985).

It was also used as the theme song of the Mike Bongiorno's TV show Pentatlon.

== Overview ==
The song was written by Mogol and Cocciante. According to Cocciante, the process of creating the song was difficult. Mina liked the song itself, but due to the fact that they could not find the key to the performance, she abruptly began to refuse to record. Nevertheless, Cocciante persuades Mina to try to perform another version of the song in a new way, but Mina declares that she will not sing like that. In the end, she succumbs to persuasion and tries to record a piece that she really likes and she agrees to record the whole song. The recording took place in England at Chipping Norton Recording Studios with the participation of the musician Paul Buckmaster.

== Critical reception ==
Giulia Ciavarelli from TV Sorrisi e Canzoni called this song the pearl of Italian music.

== Personnel ==
- Mina – vocals
- Riccardo Cocciante – arrangement, music, production, vocals
- Paul Buckmaster – arrangement, production
- Mogol – lyrics
- Piero Mannucci – mastering
- Massimiliano Pani – guitar
- Mario Robbiani – keyboards
- Giorgio Cocilovo – guitar
- Paolo Gianolio – guitar
- Marco Rinalduzzi – guitar, synthesizer
- Bruno De Filippi – harmonica
- Riccardo Biseo – keyboards

Credits are adapted from the single's and album's (Finalmente ho conosciuto il conte Dracula...) liner notes.

== Charts ==
Chart performance for "Questione di feeling"
Chart (1985)	Peak position
Italy (Billboard)	2
Italy (Musica e dischi)	2

== Cover versions ==
- In 1985, Cocciante recorded a French version of the song, "Question de feeling", in a duet with Fabienne Thibeault.
- In 1986, Italian singer Loretta Goggi performed a parody version of the song.
- The song was also later recorded by Mina in 2007 in Spanish as a duet with Tiziano Ferro for the album Todavía.
