= Nicola Salerno =

Italian lyricist

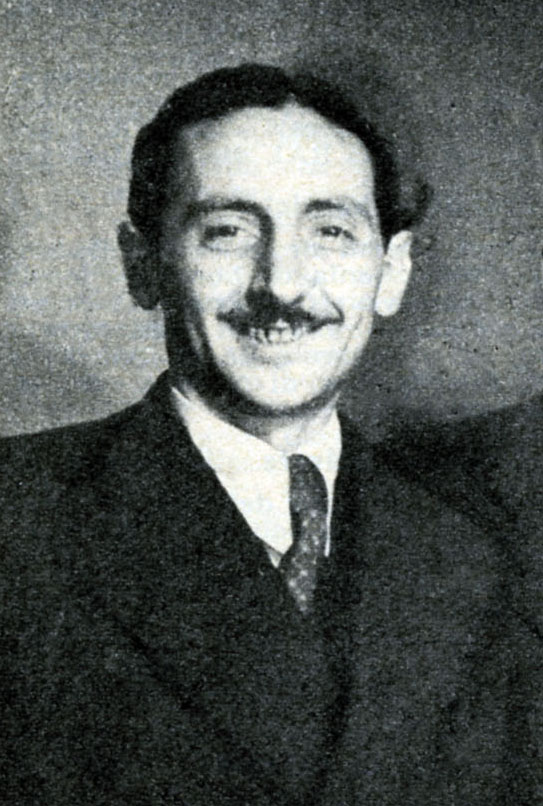
- Nisa on Radiocorriere magazine, 1938
- Born: 11 March 1910; Naples, Italy
- Died: 22 May 1969 (aged 59); Naples, Italy
- Other name: Nisa
- Occupation: Songwriter
- Children: Alberto Salerno

Nicola Salerno (11 March 1910 – 22 May 1969), often known as Nisa, was an Italian lyricist. He formed a famous songwriting duo with Renato Carosone.

== Life and career ==
Nicola Salerno was born in Naples in 1910.

His first hit was "Eulalia Torricelli" of 1947, about the unhappy love story between a wealthy girl from Forlì and a guy named Giosuè. Salerno put the whole team of songwriters (including himself, Gino Redi and Dino Olivieri) in the lyrics as heirs to each of Eulalia's three castles.

Salerno met Renato Carosone in 1955. It was Mariano Rapetti, Ricordi record company's director – and father of lyricist Mogol – who suggested that they should work together to enter a radio contest. Nisa brought Carosone three texts to be set to music. One of them was titled "Tu vuò fà l'americano". Carosone had an instant inspiration and started composing a boogie-woogie on the piano keyboard. It took just fifteen minutes to create Carosone's most famous song, that became a worldwide success. Other famous hits by the duo include "'O suspiro", "Torero", "Caravan Petrol", "Pigliate 'na pastiglia" and "'O sarracino".

Salerno worked also with other songwriters. Among his best-known lyrics are "Guaglione", winning song of the Naples Song Festival in 1956, and "Non ho l'età", with which Gigliola Cinquetti won both the Sanremo Music Festival and the Eurovision Song Contest in 1964.

Besides writing lyrics, Nicola Salerno was also an illustrator. He was the author, for example, of cover designs for some Neapolitan music scores published between the 1920s and 1930s.

He died in Naples in 1969. His son Alberto Salerno would also become a successful lyricist.

== See also ==
- We No Speak Americano
