= Augusto Martelli =

Italian musician and television personality (1940–2014)

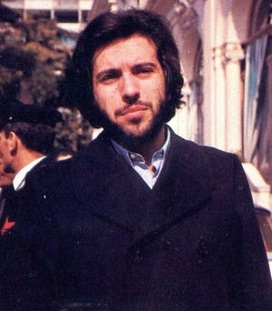
- Martelli in 1972
- Born: 15 March 1940; Genoa, Liguria, Kingdom of Italy
- Died: 3 November 2014 (aged 74); Milan, Lombardy, Italy
- Occupations: Composer; conductor; arranger; television personality
- Partner: Mina Mazzini (c. 1965–1970)

Augusto Martelli (15 March 1940 – 3 November 2014) was an Italian composer, conductor, arranger and television personality.

== Life and career ==
Born in Genoa, the son of conductor and composer Giordano Bruno Martelli, Martelli is probably best known for the song Djamballà, the theme song of the 1970 film Il dio serpente, which reached the first position in the Italian charts. He is also well known for his romantic and professional relationship with pop singer Mina, with whom he collaborated as a composer and an arranger and with whom he co-founded the music label PDU. After having been conductor in a number of RAI variety shows, starting from late seventies Martelli was also host of a number of TV programmes, mainly for Canale 5. He also composed songs and scores for a large number of Fininvest TV programmes, including the jazz-fusion instrumental piece "Round D Minor" for the motor racing show "Grand Prix" hosted by Andrea de Adamich in the 1980s.

In 2001, Martelli was involved in an investigation which culminated in the search of the homes of 113 people, who had connected to pornographic websites by paying for access with credit cards. Hundreds of child pornography images were found on Martelli's computer. He tried to exonerate himself by claiming to have conducted an investigation in collaboration with the Carabinieri, but this was denied by the military. On 12 November 2007, he was sentenced to one year and six months in prison for possession of child pornography. Martelli always claimed his innocence.

== Selected filmography ==
- Pensando a te (1969)
- More Dollars for the MacGregors (1970)
- Il dio serpente (1970)
- Sartana in the Valley of Death (1970)
- The Wind's Fierce (1970)
- We Are All in Temporary Liberty (1971)
