= Audio 2 =

Italian pop duo

Audio 2 is an Italian pop music duo, consisting of Gianni Donzelli (born 28 May 1961) and Vincenzo Leomporro (born 22 July 1961). Because of similarities in their vocal and composition style, the duo has often been compared to Lucio Battisti.

== Career ==
Born in Naples, Donzelli and Leomporro became friends in the second half of the 1970s. They formed Audio 2 after performing together in local festivals and public celebrations. Repeatedly rejected for years by record labels for sounding too similar to Lucio Battisti, they made their official songwriting debut with the song "Neve", which was recorded by Mina in her 1992 album Sorelle Lumière. After signing with Mina's label PDU, they released their first album, Audio 2, in 1993; produced by Massimiliano Pani, it became a surprise commercial success thanks to the airplay hits "Sì che non sei tu" and "Per una virgola". In 1994, Audio 2 composed and performed together with Mina "Rotola la vita".

In 1995, Audio 2 released their second album E=mc², which included the hits "Alle venti" and "Io ho te"; several songs of the album were included in Leonardo Pieraccioni's The Graduates. In 1996, they released their third album Senza riserve, and in 1998 they composed a number of songs for Mina Celentano, notably the hit "Acqua e sale". Following the strong sales with their greatest hits album The Best Airplay, the duo's subsequent releases failed to replicate the success of their earlier works. In 2009, they collaborated with longtime Battisti's collaborator Mogol for the album MogolAudio2.

== Discography ==
Album

- 1993 – Audio 2
- 1995 – E=mc²
- 1996 – Senza riserve
- 2000 – Audio2 - Mila
- 2002 – Sorrisi e canzoni
- 2006 – Acquatiche trasparenze
- 2009 – MogolAudio2
- 2019 – 432 hz
