= Giorgio Calabrese =

Italian songwriter

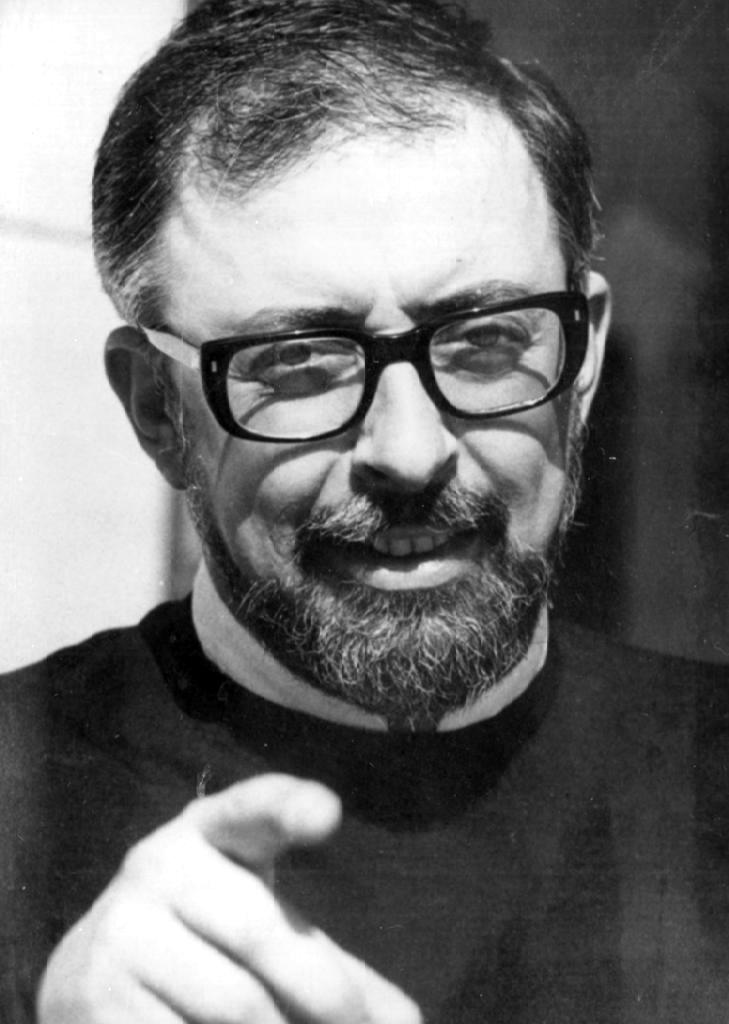
Giorgio Calabrese in 1967

Giorgio Calabrese (28 November 1929 – 31 March 2016) was an Italian songwriter and frequent collaborator with French pop music star Charles Aznavour.

Calabrese wrote the original Italian lyrics for the popular song "Softly, as I Leave You", and the Italian version of Aznavour's famous song, "She", titled "Lei". He also wrote the Italian lyrics for the song, "E se domani", composed by Carlo Alberto Rossi and recorded by Mina. It was entered in the 1964 Sanremo Music Festival.
