= Massimiliano Pani =

Italian songwriter and producer (born 1963)

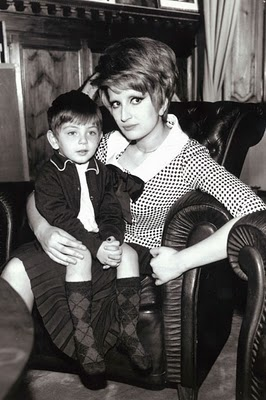
- Pani as a child with his mother Mina, 1966

Background information
- Also known as: Massimiliano Pani Mazzini
- Born: 18 April 1963 (age 63); Milan, Italy
- Genres: Pop; Europop; canzone napoletana; bossa nova; dance
- Occupations: Songwriter; producer
- Years active: 1979–present
- Labels: Italdisc; Ri-Fi; PDU; EMI

Massimiliano Pani Mazzini (born Pani, 18 April 1963) is an Italian songwriter, composer and producer.

== Early life ==
Pani was born in Milan to actor Corrado Pani and singer Mina Mazzini. Corrado Pani was married at the time and due to Mina's refusal to hide the relationship, the singer was banned from performing on public Italian television or radio channels. Within a year, her affair with Corrado ended.

== Musical career ==
At the age of sixteen he wrote his first two songs, Sensazioni and Il vento, which were both included on the 1979 album Attila by Mina. Following this, Pani trained Mario Robbiani and Celso Valli. Thereafter he started working with mother on her album Kyrie in 1980 and even appears on the cover. This would be the start of a permanent collaboration with his mother as a writer, arranger and keyboardist. While developing musical projects with Celso Valli and Piero Cassano for the musical group Matia Bazar, Pani continued to write songs for other artists including the opening theme of the 1984 Sanremo Festival, with the song Rose su rose sung by Mina.

Pani is also dedicated to the composing jingles for children's cartoons with the lyrics of Alessandra Valeri Manera. These jingles were aired by the Mediaset networks and sung by Cristina D'Avena including Principessa dai capelli blu and Prendi il mondo e vai in 1988, Siamo fatti così and Questa allegra gioventù in 1989, Un mondo di magia and Super Mario in 1990, Conosciamoci un po and Bravo Molière in 1991). In 1988, he composed some songs for the album Palla al centro per Rudy, sung by Cristina D'Avena and dedicated to the TV series of the same name.

Pani later moved on and became a talent scout. He produced the debut albums of Massimo Bozzi, the Proxima and Audio 2. Pani made his debut as a solo singer with L'occasione. The album contains music by Pani and lyrics by Giorgio Calabrese. The album is dedicated to his mother, who also appears among the choirs of the disc, under the pseudonym Regina Zoni. In 1992, his mother recorded "Non avere te", "Robinson" and a duet Come stai with Pani for her album Sorelle Lumière.

Two years later he released his second album, Storie per cani sciolti, again as a songwriter and arranger. Some pieces from this album were also recorded by Mina on her later albums. This was his past album and since then has been an active songwriter, producer and composing music for television and film.

In 1998 wrote the music for the soap opera Vivere, including the main theme, titled Canto largo, recorded later by Mina. Also in 1998, he arranged and produced the CD Mina Celentano . Four singles were released from the album (Acqua e sale, Specchi riflessi, Brivido felino, Io ho te) and the album remained in the sales chart for several months, selling more than 1,500,000 copies. In 1999 he arranges six tracks on the album Minage by Monica Naranjo, including a duet with Mina, titled El se encuentra entre tu y yo. He also occasionally arranges albums for singers Georgia, Fabrizio De André, Piero Cassano, Danilo Rea, Anna Oxa, Pelù, Fausto Leali and Franco Ambrosetti. In 2010, 2011 and 2012 he returned to TV as a judge in the children talent series Ti lascio una canzone, presented by Antonella Clerici.

== Personal life ==
He has a younger half-sister, Benedetta, who is the daughter of journalist Virgilio Crocco and his mother Mina. He has been married twice. His first marriage was to German model Ulrike Fellrath with whom he had a son, Axel Pani, in 1986.

Axel is a musician and songwriter in his own right, he has worked as a writer and has contributed to his grandmother Mina's albums, including the songs, Per poco che sia for the 2006 album Bau, Con o senza te and Il frutto che vuoi for the 2009 album Facile, Il povero e il re for the 2010 album Caramella Fly away and Only this song for the 2011 album Piccolino, "La sola ballerina che tu avrai" and "Oui c'est la vie" for the 2014 album Selfie. His second marriage is to showgirl Milena Martelli, with whom he has a son Edoardo Pani, born in June 2004. Edoardo sings on the opening lines of the song with his grandmother Mina on her 2014 album Selfie.

== Discography ==
- 1991 - L'occasione PDU CD 30015
- 1993 - Storie per cani sciolti PDU CD 30022

== Singles released by Mediaset ==
- 1988 - Prendi il mondo e vai
- 1988 - Principessa dai capelli blu
- 1989 - Questa allegra gioventù
- 1989 - Siamo fatti così (esplorando il corpo umano)
- 1990 - Super Mario (serie televisiva)|Super Mario
- 1990 - Un mondo di magia
- 1991 - Conosciamoci un po
- 1991 - Bravo Molière
- 1998 – 2008 - Canto largo

== Music for film and Television ==
- 1991 - Chiara e gli altri
- 1997 - Da cosa nasce cosa (film directed by Andrea Manni)
- 2000 - Sei forte maestro
- 2001 - Sei forte maestro
- 1998 - 2008 - Vivere (soap opera on Channel 5)
- 2006 - La terza stella (film directed by Alberto Ferrari)
- 2009 - Terapia d'urgenza
- 2010 - La banda dei Babbi Natale (directed by Paolo Genovese)

== Television ==
- 1996 - Gelato al limone, as host with Benedicta Boccoli, for Rai Uno,
- 1996 - David di Donatello, as the host of the evening awards ceremony on the network Telepiù
- 1996 - Europa mon amour, as host for Rai Uno,
- 1996 - Telethon, as host Rai Uno,
- 1997 - Telesogni, host for the Sanremo Festival for Rai Tre,
- 1997 - Premio Recanati per la Musica d'Autore, conductor for Rai Due,
- 1997 - Salone del Libro di Torino, as conductor for the Special for Rai Uno,
- 1998 - Capodanno, as conductor at the piazza di Torino for Rai Uno,
- 2010 - Ti lascio una canzone, presented by Antonella Clerici, Rai Uno, as President of the judging consisting of Stefania Sandrelli,
- 2011 - Ti lascio una canzone, condotto da Antonella Clerici, Rai Uno, as President of the judging panel consisting of Orietta Berti and Francesco Facchinetti
- 2012 - É stato solo un flirt, presented by Antonella Clerici, for Rai Uno,
- 2012 - Ti lascio una canzone, presented by Antonella Clerici, Rai Uno, member of the judging panel
- 2014 - Ti lascio una canzone, presented by Antonella Clerici, Rai Uno, member of the judging panel
