= Canzoni d'autore =

Compilation album by Mina
- Released: 21 July 1996
- Recorded: 1967–1994
- Studio: La Basilica, Milan; Studi PDU, Lugano
- Genre: Pop; rock
- Length: 65:23
- Language: Italian
- Label: PDU; EMI
- Producer: Massimiliano Pani; Mario Robbiani; Augusto Martelli

Mina chronology
Pappa di latte (1995)	Canzoni d'autore (1996)	Cremona (1996)

Canzoni d'autore is a compilation album by Italian singer Mina, released on 21 July 1996 by PDU and EMI. The album contains tracks written by Italian songwriters, but they are only in Italian. It was originally released in limited-jewel CD cases in different colors (red, yellow blue); a remastered version was reissued in 2001.

== Track listing ==
No.	Title	Writer(s)	Original album	Length
1.	"Poster"	Claudio Baglioni; Antonio Coggio	Finalmente ho conosciuto il conte Dracula... (1985)	4:50
2.	"Neve"	Giovanni Donzelli; Vincenzo Leomporro	Sorelle Lumière (1992)	5:22
3.	"Caruso"	Lucio Dalla	Ti conosco mascherina (1990)	4:13
4.	"Il leone e la gallina"	Mogol; Lucio Battisti	Canarino mannaro (1994)	3:52
5.	"Un nuovo amico / E poi..."	Mogol; Riccardo Cocciante / Andrea Lo Vecchio; Shel Shapiro	Sorelle Lumière (1992)	4:11
6.	"Zio Tom"	Fabio Concato	Ti conosco mascherina (1990)	4:56
7.	"Come mi vuoi"	Mariella Nava; Eduardo De Crescenzo	Sorelle Lumière (1992)	5:40
8.	"Canzoni stonate"	Mogol; Aldo Donati	Ridi pagliaccio (1988)	3:53
9.	"Sì, l'amore" (with Eugenio Quaini)	Pomodoro; Massimiliano Pani	Lochness (1993)	4:05
10.	"Ma chi è quello lì (ma chi è quella là)"	Michele Schembri; Giuseppe Chierchia	Rane supreme (1987)	4:24
11.	"Una lunga storia d'amore"	Gino Paoli	Uiallalla (1989)	3:29
12.	"Cowboys"	Ivano Fossati	Mina 25 (1983)	1:51
13.	"La casa del serpente"	Fossati	Caterpillar (1991)	6:10
14.	"La canzone di Marinella"	Elvio Monti; Fabrizio De André	Dedicato a mio padre (1967)	3:15
15.	"Il portiere di notte"	Enrico Ruggeri	Ridi pagliaccio (1988)	5:37
Total length:				65:23

== Charts ==
Chart performance for Canzoni d'autore
Chart (1996)	Peak position
European Albums (Music & Media)	46
Italian Albums (FIMI)	6
Italian Albums (Musica e dischi)	5
