= Orione (Italian Songbook) =

Compilation album by Mina
- Released: 27 November 2020
- Recorded: 1975–2020
- Genre: Pop
- Length: 57:15
- Language: Italian
- Label: PDU; Warner
- Producer: Massimiliano Pani

Mina chronology
Mina Fossati (2019)	Orione (Italian Songbook) (2020)	Cassiopea (Italian Songbook) (2020)

Singles from Orione (Italian Songbook)
- 1. "Nel cielo dei bars" Released: 19 November 2020

Professional ratings
Review scores
Source	Rating
Rockol	7/10

Orione (Italian Songbook) is a compilation album by Italian singer Mina, released on 27 November 2020 by PDU and Warner Music Italy. The album was released on the same day as Mina's other compilation, Cassiopea (Italian Songbook), by Sony Music Italy.

The album features songs only in Italian, recorded by Mina earlier for studio albums and compilations. A new song "Nel cielo dei bars" was also recorded for the album. It was released as a single on 19 November 2020.

== Track listing ==
No.	Title	Lyrics	Music	Original album	Length
1.	"Va bene, va bene così"	Vasco Rossi	Domenico Camporeale; Roberto Casini	Canarino mannaro (1994)	5:23
2.	"Oggi sono io"	Alex Britti	Britti	Mina in Studio (2003)	3:51
3.	"Portati via"	Stefano Borgia	Borgia	Bula Bula (2005)	3:53
4.	"Almeno tu nell'universo"	Bruno Lauzi	Maurizio Fabrizio	Pappa di latte (1995)	4:26
5.	"Io domani"	Giancarlo Bigazzi	Gianni Bella	Sì, buana (1986)	5:00
6.	"Questa canzone"	Paolo Limiti	Mario Nobile	Piccolino (2011)	3:21
7.	"Che m'importa del mondo"	Franco Migliacci	Luis Bacalov	Canarino mannaro (1994)	3:49
8.	"Una lunga storia d'amore"	Gino Paoli	Paoli	Uiallalla (1989)	3:45
9.	"Il cielo in una stanza"	Paoli	Paoli	Oggi ti amo di più (1988)	2:43
10.	"L'importante è finire"	Cristiano Malgioglio	Alberto Anelli	La Mina (1975)	3:22
11.	"Ricominciamo"	Bruno Tavernese	Luigi Albertelli	Cremona (1996)	4:04
12.	"La sola ballerina che tu avrai"	Samuele Cerri	Axel Pani; Gysi Mattia	Selfie (2014)	3:49
13.	"Parlami d'amore Mariù"	Ennio Neri	Cesare Andrea Bixio	Lochness (1993)	1:58
14.	"Amara terra mia"	Domenico Modugno; Enrica Bonaccorti	Modugno	Sconcerto (2001)	4:09
15.	"Nel cielo dei bars"	Fred Buscaglione; Leo Chiosso	Buscaglione; Chiosso	Previously unreleased	3:28
Total length:					57:15

== Charts ==
Chart performance for Orione (Italian Songbook)
Chart (2020)	Peak position
Italian Albums (FIMI)	4
Italian Vinyl Albums (FIMI)	3
