= Cassiopea (Italian Songbook) =

Compilation album by Mina
- Released: 27 November 2020
- Recorded: 1979–2020
- Genre: Pop
- Length: 68:00
- Language: Italian
- Label: PDU; Sony
- Producer: Massimiliano Pani

Mina chronology
| Orione (Italian Songbook) (2020) | Cassiopea (Italian Songbook) (2020) | MinaCelentano – The Complete Recordings (2021) |

Singles from Orione (Italian Songbook)
- 1. "Un tempo piccolo" Released: 19 November 2020

Professional ratings
Review scores
| Source | Rating |
|---|---|
| Rockol | 7/10 |

Cassiopea (Italian Songbook) is a compilation album by Italian singer Mina, released on 27 November 2020 by PDU and Sony Music Italy. The album was released on the same day as Mina's other compilation, Orione (Italian Songbook), by Warner Music Italy. The compilation contains a new song "Un tempo piccolo", written by Antonio Gaudi, Alberto Laurenti and Franco Califano, and first performed by Tiromancino in 2005.

== Track listing ==
| No. | Title | Lyrics | Music | Original album | Length |
|---|---|---|---|---|---|
| 1. | "Anche un uomo" | Alberto Testa; Ludovico Peregrini; Mike Bongiorno | Anselmo Genovese | Attila (1979) | 4:48 |
| 2. | "La lontananza" | Domenico Modugno; Enrica Bonaccorti | Modugno | Sconcerto (2001) | 6:11 |
| 3. | "Vento nel vento" | Mogol | Lucio Battisti | Paradiso (Lucio Battisti Songbook) (2018) | 4:36 |
| 4. | "Caruso" | Lucio Dalla | Dalla | Ti conosco mascherina (1990) | 4:07 |
| 5. | "Oro / La canzone del sole" | Mogol | Pino Mango / Battisti | Canarino mannaro (1994) | 5:59 |
| 6. | "I migliori anni della nostra vita" | Guido Morra | Maurizio Fabrizio | Mina n° 0 (1999) | 5:16 |
| 7. | "Canzoni stonate" | Mogol | Aldo Donati | Ridi pagliaccio (1988) | 4:12 |
| 8. | "Fortissimo" | Lina Wertmüller | Bruno Canfora | Ti conosco mascherina (1990) | 4:20 |
| 9. | "Malafemmena" | Totò | Totò | Ti conosco mascherina (1990) | 3:32 |
| 10. | "Volami nel cuore" | Testa | Gualtiero Malgoni; Manrico Mologni | Cremona (1996) | 3:34 |
| 11. | "Con te sarà diverso" | Fabrizio Berlincioni | Mauro Culotta | Leggera (1997) | 4:32 |
| 12. | "Compagna di viaggio" | Giorgio Faletti | Faletti | Piccolino (2011) | 4:11 |
| 13. | "Volevo scriverti da tanto" | Maria Francesca Polli | Moreno Ferrara | Maeba (2018) | 4:27 |
| 14. | "L'uomo dell'autunno" | Giuseppe Fulcheri | Fabrizio | Piccolino (2011) | 4:44 |
| 15. | "Un tempo piccolo" | Antonio Gaudino | Franco Califano; Alberto Laurenti | Previously unreleased | 4:06 |
| Total length: | | | | | 68:00 |

== Charts ==
Chart performance for Cassiopea (Italian Songbook)
| Chart (2020) | Peak position |
|---|---|
| Italian Albums (FIMI) | 3 |
| Italian Vinyl Albums (FIMI) | 2 |
| Swiss Albums (Schweizer Hitparade) | 78 |
