= Mina canta i Beatles =

Studio album by Mina
- Released: 11 June 1993
- Recorded: 1976; 1988; 26 May 1993
- Studio: La Basilica, Milan; Studi PDU, Lugano
- Genre: Pop; rock
- Length: 46:43
- Label: PDU

Mina chronology
Sorelle Lumière (1992)	Mina canta i Beatles (1993)	Lochness (1993)

Mina canta i Beatles (English: Mina sings the Beatles) is a studio album by Italian singer Mina, released on 11 June 1993 by PDU and distributed by EMI Italiana. The album is dedicated to the British band the Beatles.

== Overview ==
Mina canta i Beatles was released uncharacteristically in June 1993. For the past few albums Mina released a double album annually in the fall of each year. This album is "a hard modern take on The Beatles music, incorporating intelligence and technology". Mina canta i Beatles features eleven songs, of which only six were recorded in 1993. The remaining five songs were recorded by Mina at various times in her career when she ventured into the Beatles songbook. While the songs do not eclipse the original versions, they are interpreted in classical Mina style with interesting vocal arrangements.

The album starts with the track "Something", a song written by George Harrison taken from the album Abbey Road (1969), and played here on brushes and flugelhorn. Mina had recorded the song previously in a symphonic version for the album Mina of 1971. The track "Let It Be" has an eccentric opening as it starts "as a march of Kurt Weill, with the sound of an accordion, the sounds and the voices of a fair". The mood shifts for the track "The Fool on the Hill" where Mina sings over a light rhythm of the bossa nova. On the track "When I'm Sixty-Four", Mina hums in Italian as the 78 laps of the Trio Lescano play on. The track "The Long and Winding Road" is counterpointed by a romantic piano while on "Yesterday" Mina becomes "careful and respectful and does not deviate too much from the original arrangement with the classic of classics".

Mina had already recorded the tracks "Michelle" and "My Love" for her 1976 album Plurale, "She's Leaving Home" for her 1980 album Kyrie, "Hey Jude" for her 1984 album Catene and "Oh! Darling" for her 1989 album Uiallalla.

In Mina canta i Beatles, Mina "sings as if this were recorded live at a club. The songs are soft and loose, cementing her as a great interpreter without exaggeration or needing to prove that force is the cleverest. The songs are sung with naturalness, a simplicity that, coupled with her vocal abilities, makes for a splendid listening experience".

The weekly magazine Noi released an article about the album to coincide with the album’s release. The article was written by Mina herself, who is a regularly collaborator of the magazine. The article explains how Mina discovered the music of the Beatles and how she approached the album: When I was younger, if I listened to them no matter the reason or location I was immediately smitten with their music. I did not know who they were initially, but I realized that I was living in a memorable historic event. Like virtually every other person at that stage in music, I was struck by their melodies and lyrics, their music contained a uniformity of emotions, passion all encompassed in a single song. This was at the time really a phenomenon for all and I am sure I was not the only one who experienced this admiration for their music.

== Cover art ==
The album cover is almost a replica of the Revolver album by the Beatles released in 1966. Only instead of Beatles, logically the design of the face of Mina replicated four times. The designs of the face of Mina are taken from the singer's previous covers (starting from 'top left): Sorelle Lumière (Picture inside sleeve), Catene, Minacantalucio, Rane supreme.

== Track listing ==
All tracks are written by John Lennon and Paul McCartney, except were noted.

No.	Title	Writer(s)	Length
1.	"Something"	George Harrison	3:48
2.	"Let It Be"		4:06
3.	"The Fool on the Hill"		4:00
4.	"When I'm Sixty-Four"		2:48
5.	"The Long and Winding Road"		3:54
6.	"Yesterday"		2:49
7.	"Michelle"		5:36
8.	"Hey Jude"		6:17
9.	"She's Leaving Home"		5:33
10.	"My Love"	McCartney	4:17
11.	"Oh! Darling"		3:32
Total length:			46:43

== Personnel ==
- Mina – vocals
- Sergio Farina – acoustic guitar
- Manuela Cortesi – backing vocals
- Massimiliano Pani – backing vocals, keyboards
- Massimo Bozzi – backing vocals
- Monica Magnani – backing vocals
- Rino Ghiretti – bass tuba
- Massimo Moriconi – bass, double bass
- Giancarlo Porro – clarinet, bass Clarinet
- Maurizio Dei Lazzaretti – drums
- Andrea Braido – electric guitar, classical guitar
- Danilo Rea – electric piano, piano
- Franco Ambrosetti – flugelhorn
- Wally Allifranchini – flute
- Candelo Cabezas – percussion
- Paolo Cingolani-Frulla – recording, mixing (1–6)
- Nuccio Rinaldis – recording (7–11)

Credits are adapted from the album's liner notes.

== Charts ==
Chart performance for Mina canta i Beatles
Chart (1993)	Peak position
European Albums (Music & Media)	42
Italian Albums (Musica e dischi)	3
