= Oggi ti amo di più =

Compilation album by Mina
- Released: February 1988
- Recorded: 1968–1988
- Studio: La Basilica, Milan
- Genre: Pop; rock
- Length: 45:22
- Label: PDU

Mina chronology
Rane supreme (1987)	Oggi ti amo di più (1988)	Ridi pagliaccio (1988)

Oggi ti amo di più is a compilation album by Italian singer Mina, released in February 1988 by PDU and distributed by EMI Italiana.

The album includes new versions of Mina's classic hits "Il cielo in una stanza" and "E se domani".

== Track listing ==
No.	Title	Lyrics	Music	Original album	Length
1.	"Grande, grande, grande"	Alberto Testa	Tony Renis	Mina (1971)	4:00
2.	"L'importante è finire"	Cristiano Malgioglio	Alberto Anelli	La Mina (1975)	3:20
3.	"Ancora, ancora, ancora"	Malgioglio	Gian Pietro Felisatti	Live '78 (1978)	4:19
4.	"E se domani"	Giorgio Calabrese	Carlo Alberto Rossi	Previously unreleased	2:17
5.	"Ahi, mi' amor"	Paolo Limiti	Joan Manuel Serrat	Mina 25 (1983)	6:16
6.	"Amor mio"	Mogol	Lucio Battisti	Mina (1971)	4:48
7.	"Io e te da soli"	Mogol	Battisti	Del mio meglio (1971)	4:31
8.	"Bugiardo e incosciente (La tieta)"	Limiti	Serrat	...bugiardo più che mai... più incosciente che mai... (1969)	6:18
9.	"E poi..."	Andrea Lo Vecchio	Shel Shapiro	Frutta e verdura (1973)	4:49
10.	"Il cielo in una stanza"	Gino Paoli	Paoli	Previously unreleased	2:18
11.	"Emozioni"	Mogol	Battisti	Minacantalucio (1975)	4:36
12.	"Vorrei che fosse amore"	Antonio Amurri	Bruno Canfora	Canzonissima '68 (1968)	2:26
Total length:					45:22

== Personnel ==
- Mina – vocals (all tracks)
- Pino Presti – arrangement (1, 2, 9)
- Alberto Nicorelli – arrangement (3)
- Renato Sellani – arrangement, piano (4, 10)
- Mario Robbiani – arrangement (5)
- Gian Piero Reverberi – arrangement (6, 7)
- Augusto Martelli – arrangement (8)
- Gabriel Yared – arrangement (11)
- Bruno Canfora – arrangement (12)
- Nuccio Rinaldis – audio engineer

== Charts ==
Initial chart performance for Oggi ti amo di più
Chart (1988)	Peak position
Italian Albums (Billboard)	4
Italian Albums (Musica e dischi)	1

1995 chart performance for Oggi ti amo di più
Chart (1995)	Peak position
Italian Albums (FIMI)	20
