= Di tanto in tanto =

Compilation album by Mina
- Released: 1978
- Length: 44:00
- Label: PDU

Mina chronology
Mina con bignè (1977)	Di tanto in tanto (1978)	Mina Live '78 (1978)

Di tanto in tanto is a compilation album released by Mina in 1978. All tracks have previously been published on various albums.

== Track listing ==
No.	Title	Writer(s)	Length
1.	"La pioggia di marzo - Frutta e verdura (1973)"	Antônio Carlos Jobim, Giorgio Calabrese	3:44
2.	"Laia ladaia (Reza) - Dalla Bussola (1972)"	Edu Lobo, Ruy Guerra	3:43
3.	"Flamingo - Baby Gate (1974)"	Ed Anderson, Ted Grouya	3:07
4.	"Nuur - Mina® (1974)"	Osvaldo Miccike, Ermanno Capelli	4:30
5.	"E poi... - Frutta e verdura (1973)"	Andrea Lo Vecchio, Shel Shapiro	4:53
6.	"Non ho parlato mai - Mina (1971)"	Paolo Limiti, Mario Robbiani	3:21
7.	"It's Only Make Believe - Baby Gate (1974)"	Conway Twitty, Jack Nance	2:22
8.	"Due o forse tre - Mina® (1974)"	Andrea Lo Vecchio, Shel Shapiro	4:14
9.	"Carlo detto il mandrillo - Amanti di valore (1973)"	Franco Califano, Carlo Pes	3:00
10.	"Le mani sui fianchi - Cinquemilaquarantatre (1972)"	Romolo Forlai, Gian Franco Reverberi	2:57
11.	"Ballata d'autunno (Balada de otono) - Altro (1972)"	Joan Manuel Serrat, Paolo Limiti	5:45
12.	"Questo si, questo no - Frutta e verdura (1973)"	Pino Donaggio, Giorgio Calabrese	4:24
Total length:			44:00

== Credits ==
- Mina – vocals
- Pino Presti – arranger/conductor
- Gianni Ferrio – arranger/conductor in "Laia ladaia (Reza)"
- Natale Massara – arranger/conductor in "Ballata d'autunno (Balada de otono)"
- Nuccio Rinaldis – sound engineer
