= Mauro Balletti =

Italian photographer and painter

- Born: 4 September 1952 (age 73); Milan, Italy
- Occupations: Photographer; painter; graphic designer
- Years active: 1972–present
- Website: mauroballetti.com

Mauro Balletti (born 4 September 1952) is an Italian photographer, painter and graphic designer.

== Collaboration with Mina ==
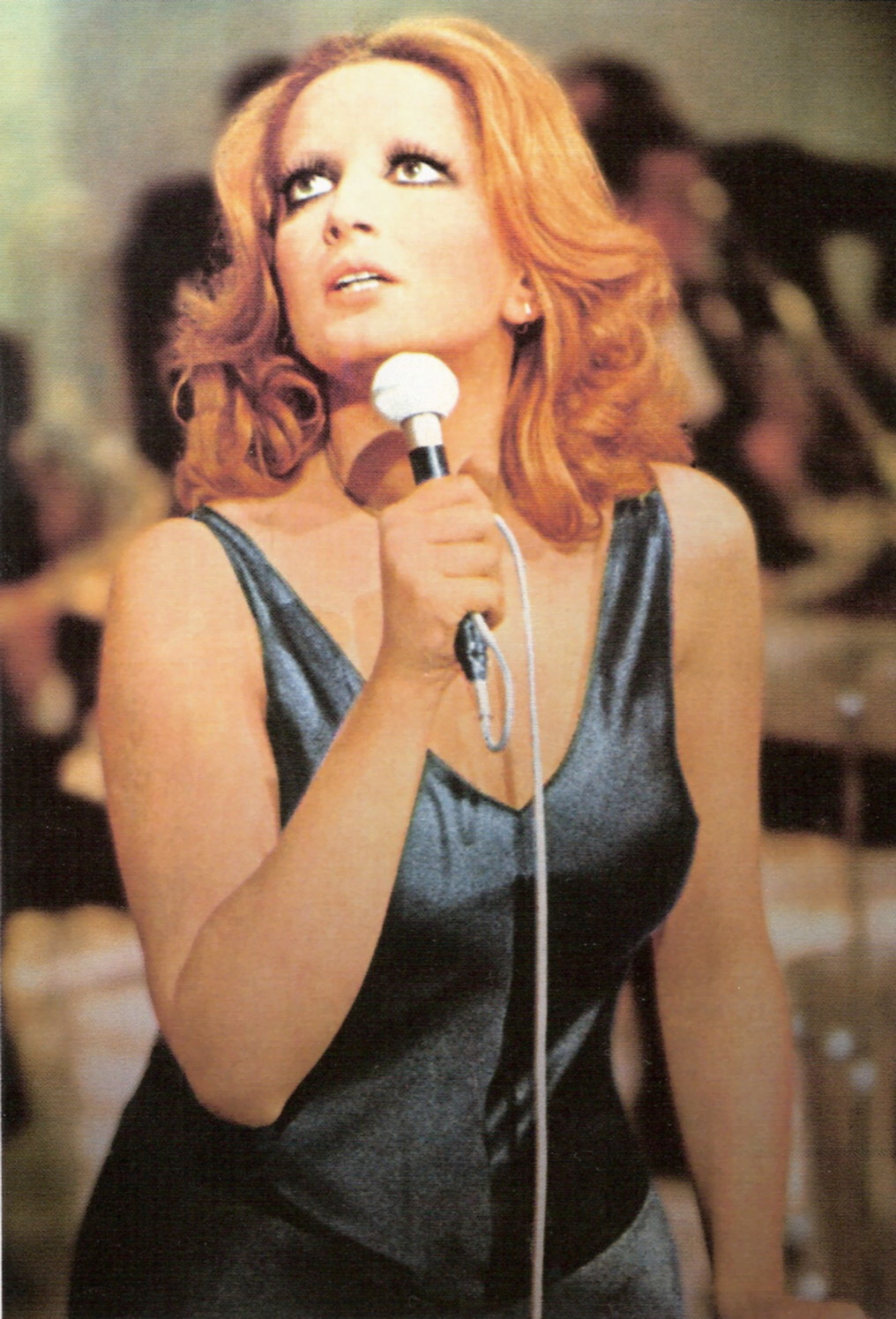
Mina, with whom Balletti has been collaborating since 1972

Belletti is particularly known for his work with Italian singer Mina. Mina met Belletti during the filming of a commercial for Tassoni, and knowing that he was an artist, she invited him to take some photos, thereby discovering a new talent in him.

A few months later, in 1973, Mina's albums Frutta e verdura/Amanti di valore, the author of the covers of which was Balletti. Some of Mina's album covers by his authorship have gained great fame (some of them are the result of collaboration with Gianni Ronco). In particular, the album cover of Attila was recognized as the best cover of the year and exhibited at the Museum of Modern Art in New York; while the album cover of Salomè (1981) with a "bearded" Mina, or Rane supreme, where Mina's face is photoshopped to the body of a bodybuilder, caused a lot of controversy. Balletti also actively used computer technology to create the covers. In 1992, he was the first to create a cover with a digital image, using a Mac computer. In the same year, he received the Italian Advertisers Award for the best image/packaging of the year (Sorelle Lumière album cover).

In 2016, Gianluigi Attorre and Katerina Mollica's special program Tra le immagini di Mina – L'arte di Mauro Balletti, dedicated to Balletti, was broadcast on Sky.

At the 2018 Sanremo Music Festival, Mina "appeared" as an avatar, a three-dimensional hologram previously featured on the cover of Gianni Ronco's Piccolino (2011), which was also created by Balletti.

In 2025, Mina released a music video "Senza farsi male", dedicated to Balletti, which also captures the artist's creative process.

Vogue Italia magazine stated that Balleti is "the only authorized emissary, the singular spokesman (although they are images) of a beloved national icon who for decades has been hiding in some far corner of the galaxy", created "richest and most transgressive series of album covers in the history of music".

== Other works ==
Balletti continued to pursue professional photography. His first solo exhibition was held in 1978 at the Galleria D'arte Treves; another solo exhibition in 1980 at the Galleria L'Isola on Via Solferino in Milan. In the following years, Balletti will hold many more solo exhibitions both in Italy and abroad.

In the 1980s, he began collaborating as a photographer with some fashion magazines, and since then he has also been directly involved in advertising.

Since the 1990s, he began making commercials, music videos, and short films, and supervised the production of television programs. His first short film, Strong Seat Belts, starring Benedetta Mazzini and Massimo Popolizio, entered the Venice Film Festival in 1996 and was selected to participate in the British Short Film Festival in 1997.
