= Ti amo... =

Compilation album by Mina
- Released: 16 June 2006
- Recorded: at PDU studios in Lugano
- Length: 67 min : 16 s
- Label: PDU
- Producer: Massimiliano Pani

Ti amo... is a compilation album released in 2006 by the Italian singer Mina. The album contains previously released songs between 1994 and 2005. The cover is inspired by the pop art artist Roy Lichtenstein.

== Track listing ==
No.	Title	Writer(s)	Length
1.	"Fragile from Bula Bula (2005)"	Gennaro Parlato, Leonardo Abbate, Tiziano Borghi	3:40
2.	"Noi soli insieme from Leggera (1997)"	Alberto Salerno, Mauro Culotta	4:38
3.	"Dove sarai from Bula Bula (2005)"	Antonio Elia, Nicolò Fragile	4:33
4.	"Io sarò con te fromCremona (album) (1996)"	Maurizio Morante	3:54
5.	"Portati via from Bula Bula (2005)"	Stefano Borgia	4:34
6.	"Stai così from Leggera (1997)"	Filippo Trojani	5:18
7.	"Amore (ft Riccardo Cocciante) from Canarino mannaro (1994)"	Maurizio Monti, Riccardo Cocciante	5:49
8.	"Come gocce from Olio (1999)"	Francesco Garzone, Luigi Pignalosa, Vincenzo Capasso	5:12
9.	"Dio, come ti amo from Sconcerto (2001)"	Domenico Modugno	5:34
10.	"Torno venerdi from Pappa di latte (1995)"	Giorgio Calabrese, Massimiliano Pani	5:21
11.	"20 parole from Bula Bula (2005)"	Roberto Roversi-Alberto Ravasini	3:09
12.	"La bacchetta magica from Cremona (album) (1996)"	Maria Enrica Andolfi	3:59
13.	"Canto largo from Olio (1999)"	Samuele Cerri, Massimiliano Pani)	3:11
14.	"D’amore non scrivo più from Veleno (2002)"	Mauro Santoro	4:00
15.	"Di vista from Pappa di latte (1995)"	Tullio Pizzorno	4:33
16.	"Na voce 'na chitarra (e o poco luna) from Canarino mannaro (1994)"	Ugo Calise, Carlo Alberto Rossi)	4:33

== Charts ==
Chart (2006)	Peak position
Classification Italian Chart (FIMI)	29
