= Frutta e verdura =

Studio album by Mina
- Released: 23 October 1973
- Recorded: 1972–1973
- Studio: La Basilica, Milan; Fonorama, Milan
- Genre: Pop; bossa nova
- Length: 38:50
- Language: Italian
- Label: PDU

Mina chronology
Del mio meglio n. 2 (1973)	Frutta e verdura (1973)	Amanti di valore (1973)

Singles from Frutta e verdura
- 1. "E poi..." Released: October 1973

Frutta e verdura is a studio album by Italian singer Mina, released in October 1973 by PDU and originally distributed by EMI Italiana as a double album along with Amanti di valore. This pair of albums spent eight consecutive weeks at the first place of the Italian chart.

The cover of this album is the first one created by Mauro Balletti.

== Track listing ==
Side A
No.	Title	Writer(s)	Length
1.	"Fa qualcosa"	Alberto Testa; Walter Malgoni	3:58
2.	"Non tornare più"	Dario Baldan Bembo; Franco Califano	4:42
3.	"Devo tornare a casa mia"	Luigi Clausetti	3:50
4.	"Domenica sera"	Stefano Scandolara; Corrado Castellari	3:20
5.	"La vigilia di Natale"	Andrea Lo Vecchio; Shel Shapiro	3:38
Total length:			19:28

Side B
No.	Title	Writer(s)	Length
1.	"Questo sì, questo no"	Pino Donaggio; Giorgio Calabrese	4:20
2.	"E poi..."	Lo Vecchio; Shapiro	4:47
3.	"Dichiarazione d'amore"	Alberto Anelli; Vito Pallavicini	3:00
4.	"La pioggia di marzo (Aguas de Março)"	Antônio Carlos Jobim; Giorgio Calabrese	3:40
5.	"Tentiamo ancora"	Lo Vecchio; Giuseppe Prestipino	3:35
Total length:			19:22

== Personnel ==
- Mina – vocals
- Pino Presti – arrangement (A1, A4–B5), bass, piano, Rhodes piano
- Dario Baldan Bembo – arrangement (A2)
- Natale Massara – arrangement (A3)
- Nuccio Rinaldis – sound engineering
- Mario Carulli – recording (A3)
- Massimo Verardi – acoustic guitar, mandolin
- Dino Comolli's "I musicals" – backing vocals
- Renè Mantegna – conga
- Tullio De Piscopo – drums
- Andrea Sacchi – electric and acoustic guitar
- Sergio Farina – electric guitar
- Hugo Heredia – flute
- Victor Bacchetta – piano, Hammond organ
- Oscar Valdambrini – trumpet
- Al Korvin – trumpet
- Fermo Lini – trumpet
- Giuliano Bernicchi – trumpet
- Sergio Almangano – violin
- Arturo Prestipino Giarritta – violin
- Dino Comolli – whistling (A4)
- Mauro Balletti – photography
- Luciano Tallarini – artwork, design

Credits are adapted from the album's liner notes.

== Charts ==
=== Weekly charts ===
Weekly chart performance for Frutta e verdura and Amanti di valore
Chart (1974)	Peak position
Italian Albums (Billboard)	2
Italian Albums (Musica e dischi)	1

Chart performance for Frutta e verdura
Chart (1974)	Peak position
Italian Albums (Musica e dischi)	2

=== Monthly charts ===
Monthly chart performance for Frutta e verdura and Amanti di valore
Chart (1974)	Peak position
Italian Albums (Musica e dischi)	1

== Cover versions ==
Some of the songs of this album have been recorded in different languages by Mina during the 1970s. "Non tornare più" was covered and released in French ("Les oiseaux reviennent") in a 1974 as a single. "Devo tornare a casa mia" was covered in 1975 in Spanish, "Debo volver ya con los mios", as well as "Questo sì, questo no" ("Esto sì, esto no"). "Domenica sera" has three different versions: in Spanish ("Domingo a la noche"), in German ("Die Liebe am Sonntag") and in English ("Don't Ask Me To Love You"). "E poi..." was recorded in other four languages: English ("Runaway"), Spanish ("¿Y que?""), french ("Et puis ça sert à quoi") and German ("Und dann"). There is also versions of the song in 1992 album Sorelle Lumière, in which the song was mixed with Riccardo Cocciante's "Un nuovo amico".
