= Mina Live '78 =

Live '78

Live album by Mina
- Released: October 1978
- Recorded: 23 August 1978
- Venue: Bussoladomani, Tuscany
- Genre: Pop; rock; disco; jazz
- Length: 64:47
- Language: Italian; English; Neapolitan; Spanish
- Label: PDU

Mina chronology
Di tanto in tanto (1978)	Live '78 (1978)	Del mio meglio n. 5 (1979)

Singles from Live '78
- 1. "Città vuota (It's a Lonely Town)" Released: May 1978

Live '78 is the third live album by Italian singer Mina, released in 1978 by PDU and distributed by EMI Italiana. Recorded at the Bussoladomani theatre on 23 August 1978, it captured the last public appearance made by the singer. It was arranged and conducted by Pino Presti, with Nuccio Rinaldis and Albramo Pesatori as the sound engineers.

== Critical reception ==
Claudio Milano of OndaRock gave the album an average rating, noting that it has both wonderful numbers and terrifying ones. He called Mina herself the main problem of the album, who sings mostly too pretentiously, and sometimes even vulgarly. In 2012 Rolling Stone placed it on the 81st place of the list of the hundred best Italian albums, and in 2021 the magazine included it in the list of the twenty best Italian live albums. Patrizio Ruviglioni noted that this is the most iconic and melancholic of Mina's three live albums, regal and at the same time modest. In 2015, the magazine Panorama named Live '78 one of the ten essential albums by Mina.

== Track listing ==
Side A
No.	Title	Writer(s)	Length
1.	"Stasera io qui"	Ivano Fossati	2:03
2.	"Stayin' Alive"	Barry Gibb; Robin Gibb; Maurice Gibb	1:45
3.	"L'importante è finire"	Cristiano Malgioglio; Alberto Anelli	2:54
4.	"Non può morire un'idea"	Fossati	4:25
5.	"E poi..."	Andrea Lo Vecchio; Shel Shapiro	5:07

Side B
No.	Title	Writer(s)	Length
1.	"Sognando"	Don Backy	4:02
2.	"Ancora, ancora, ancora"	Malgioglio; Gian Pietro Felisatti	4:33
3.	"Lacreme napulitane"	Libero Bovio; Francesco Buongiovanni	4:53
4.	"El Porompompero"	José Antonio Ochaita; Xandro Valerio; Juan Solano	2:53

Side C
No.	Title	Writer(s)	Length
1.	"Georgia on My Mind"	Hoagy Carmichael; Stuart Gorrell	3:15
2.	"Angela"	José Feliciano; Janna Merlyn Feliciano	1:40
3.	"Margherita"	Riccardo Cocciante; Marco Luberti	3:11
4.	"Città vuota (It's a Lonely Town)"	Doc Pomus; Mort Shuman; Giuseppe Cassia	3:35
5.	"Amante amore"	Malgioglio; Pino Presti	3:29

Side D
No.	Title	Writer(s)	Length
1.	"Emozioni"	Mogol; Lucio Battisti	2:13
2.	"Ancora tu"	Mogol; Battisti	1:40
3.	"Sì, viaggiare"	Mogol; Battisti	1:13
4.	"I giardini di marzo"	Mogol; Battisti	4:05
5.	"We Are the Champions"	Freddie Mercury	4:16
6.	"Grande, grande, grande"	Tony Renis; Alberto Testa	3:35

== Personnel ==
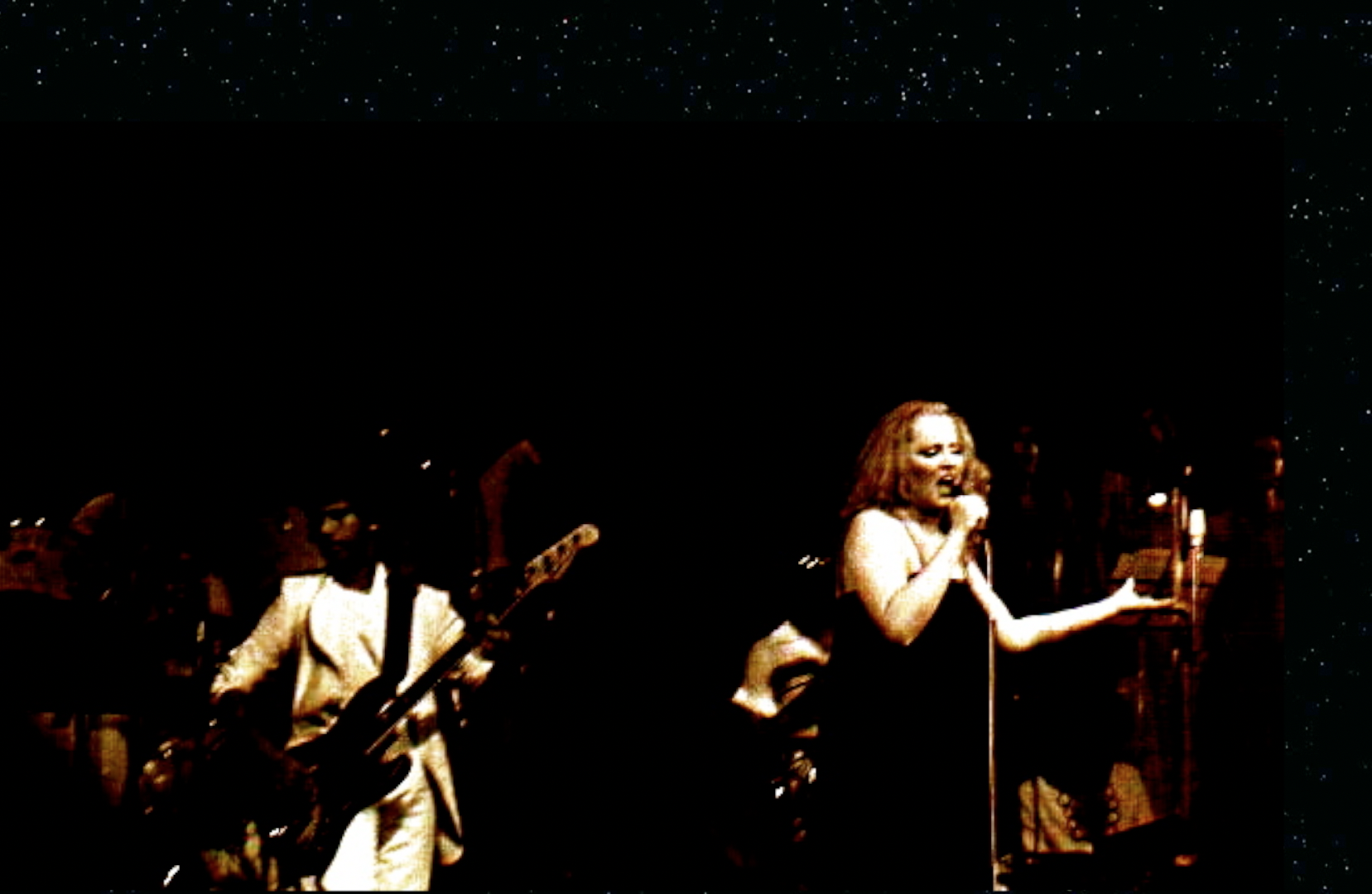
Mina during the live recording backed by the orchestra conducted by bassist/arranger Pino Presti

- Mina – vocals
- Pino Presti – arrangement, conducting, electric bass
- Sergio Farina – acoustic guitar, electric guitar
- Beppe Cantarelli – acoustic guitar, electric guitar
- Lella Esposito – backing vocals
- Marva Jan Marrow – backing vocals
- Miriam Del Mare – backing vocals
- Vanda Radicchi – backing vocals
- George Aghedo – congas, percussion
- Mino Fabiano – double bass
- Walter Scebran – drums
- Bruno De Filippi – electric guitar, harmonica, mandolin
- Alberto Mompellio – keyboards
- Aldo Banfi – keyboards
- Nando De Luca – piano
- Nuccio Rinaldis – sound engineer

Credits are adapted from the album's liner notes.

== Charts ==
Chart performance for Live '78
Chart (1978–1979)	Peak position
Italian Albums (Billboard)	5
Italian Albums (Musica e dischi)	4
