= L'occasione =

Studio album by Massimiliano Pani
- Released: May 1991
- Studio: PDU Studios, Lugano
- Length: 40:33
- Label: PDU
- Producer: Massimiliano Pani

Massimiliano Pani chronology
L'occasione (1991)	Storie per cani sciolti (1993)

L'occasione is the debut album by Italian producer Massimiliano Pani, released in 1991.

== Background and content ==
Pani's mother, noted singer Mina, appears on the album as part of the choir under the pseudonym of "Queen Zoni". In the credits, Pani acknowledged his mother as "the greatest woman I've ever known. Ten years ago she decided to hire me as her assistant because she believed in me."

Mina later recorded the tracks "Come stai", "Robinson" and "Non avere te" for her album Sorelle Lumière (1992), and "Torno venerdì" for Pappa di latte (1995).

== Track listing ==
No.	Title	Writer(s)	Length
1.	"Come stai"	G. Calabrese; G. Ferandi; M. Pani	4:06
2.	"Robinson"	G. Calabrese; M. Pani	3:32
3.	"Non avere te"	G. Calabrese; M. Bozzi; M. Pani	4:55
4.	"In brodo"	G. Calabrese; M. Pani	3:52
5.	"Torno venerdì"	G. Calabrese; M. Pani	5:00
6.	"Doveva essere il nostro giorno"	G. Calabrese; M. Pani	4:58
7.	"Di lì"	G. Calabrese; M. Pani	4:05
8.	"Giò"	G. Calabrese; M. Pani	4:33
9.	"Questo è quanto"	G. Calabrese; M. Pani	3:35
10.	"L'occasione"	G. Calabrese; M. Pani	3:57

== Personnel ==
- Massimiliano Pani – voice, arrangement and orchestra director
