= Leggera =

Leggera may refer to:

- Leggera (album), by Italian singer Mina
- Leggera (horse), a racehorse
