= Selfie (album) =

Studio album by Mina
- Released: 10 June 2014
- Genre: Pop, jazz
- Length: 54:24
- Language: Italian
- Label: GSU; PDU
- Producer: Massimiliano Pani

Mina chronology
Christmas Song Book (2013)	Selfie (2014)	Le migliori (2016)

Singles from Selfie
- 1. "La palla è rotonda" Released: 14 May 2014; 2. "Troppa luce" Released: 4 July 2014; 3. "Questa donna insopportabile" Released: 22 September 2014

Selfie is a studio album by Italian singer Mina. It was released originally on 10 June 2014 and also released on vinyl on 17 June 2014. It is Mina's first album of new songs since Piccolino in 2011.

== Critical reception ==
Professional ratings
Review scores
Source	Rating
All Music Italia	8/10

Simone Caprioli from All Music Italia stated that this is a good record that adds more to an artist who has something more to say even fifty-six years after her debut. Giovanni Ferrari from Panorama noted that this is an important project for Mina, who creates, in accordance with the title of the album, a real self-portrait of her current life, in which song after song she, not without a shadow of shame, reveals her gray areas and, based on them, talks about new problems and awareness.

== Track listing ==
No.	Title	Writer(s)	Length
1.	"Questa donna insopportabile"	Federico Spagnoli	5:11
2.	"Io non sono lei"	Maurizio Morante; Ugo Bongianni; Massimiliano Pani	3:39
3.	"La sola ballerina che tu avrai"	Samuele Cerri; Mattia Gysi; Axel Pani	3:50
4.	"Il pelo nell'uovo"	Gianni Bindi; Matteo Mancini	4:00
5.	"Alla fermata"	Gianni Leuci	4:15
6.	"Perdimi"	Mario Capuano	4:44
7.	"Il giocattolo"	Bindi; Mancini	4:16
8.	"Mai visti due"	Cerri; Franco Serafini	4:17
9.	"Troppa luce"	Bindi; Matteo Mancini	3:50
10.	"La palla è rotonda"	Maurizio Catalani; Claudio Sanfilippo	2:54
11.	"Oui c'est la vie"	Morante; A. Pani	4:30
12.	"Aspettando l'alba"	Fabrizio Berlincioni; Mauro Culotta	4:32
13.	"Fine"	Don Backy	4:26
Total length:			54:24

== Charts ==
=== Weekly charts ===
Weekly chart performance for Selfie
Chart (2014)	Peak position
Italian Albums (FIMI)	5

=== Year-end charts ===
Year-end chart performance for Selfie
Chart (2014)	Position
Italian Albums (FIMI)	81
