= Mina Fossati =

- Standard edition cover

Studio album by Mina and Ivano Fossati
- Released: 22 November 2019
- Recorded: 2017–2019
- Venue: Lugano, Switzerland
- Studio: Studi PDU
- Genre: Pop; chanson
- Label: PDU; Il Volatore
- Producer: Massimiliano Pani

Mina chronology
Paradiso (Lucio Battisti Songbook) (2018)	Mina Fossati (2019)	Orione (Italian Songbook) (2020)

Ivano Fossati chronology
Decadancing (2011)	Mina Fossati (2019)

Singles from Mina Fossati
- 1. "Tex-Mex" Released: 7 November 2019; 2. "Luna diamante" Released: 14 December 2019; 3. "L’infinito di stelle" Released: 17 January 2020; 4. "Ladro" Released: 16 October 2020

Professional ratings
Review scores
Source	Rating
All Music Italia	6/10
Rockol	4/5 stars
Newsic	4/5 stars

Mina Fossati is a collaborative album by Italian singers Mina and Ivano Fossati, released on 22 November 2019 by PDU and Il Volatore and distributed by Sony Music.

== Overview ==
Mina and Fossati decided to record a joint album back in 1997, they even met then and discussed the concept, but record labels were not enthusiastic about this venture and the project had to be shelved.

Nevertheless, twenty years later, Mina confessed to Fossati that she was still not against a joint record. Fossati himself released the last album in 2011, considering it formally the last, which is why he was somewhat hesitant to agree to this work. Nevertheless, he agreed and wrote lyrics and music for almost two years. He submitted twelve original songs, eleven of which were recorded, and another was rejected by Mina because she considered it "too sweet" for the album.

The record was released on November 22, 2019 in various formats, including digital, CD, vinyl and box set. The album peaked at number two in Italy and number 26 in Switzerland. In 2020, the album was certified platinum in Italy.

== Track listing ==
All tracks are written by Ivano Fossati

Standard edition
No.	Title	Length
1.	"L’infinito di stelle"	3:44
2.	"Farfalle"	2:59
3.	"Ladro"	3:51
4.	"Come volano le nuvole"	4:14
5.	"La guerra fredda"	4:24
6.	"Luna diamante"	4:34
7.	"Tex-Mex"	4:03
8.	"Amore della domenica"	4:04
9.	"Meraviglioso è tutto qui"	3:16
10.	"L’uomo perfetto"	4:18
11.	"Niente meglio di noi due"	3:43

Deluxe edition (bonus tracks)
No.	Title	Length
12.	"Settembre"	3:21
13.	"Settembre"	3:07
14.	"La guerra fredda" (Versione con archi)	4:25

== Personnel ==
- Mina – vocal
- Ivano Fossati – vocal
- Massimo Tagliata – accordion
- Luca Meneghello – acoustic guitar, electric guitar, guitar
- Gabriele Comeglio – alto saxophone, soprano saxophone
- Massimiliano Pani – arrangement, backing vocals
- Massimo Moriconi – contrabass, fretless bass
- Alfredo Golino – drums
- Faso – electric bass
- Danilo Rea – grand piano, electric piano
- Claudio Fossati – percussion
- Andrea Maini – viola
- Barbara Ostini – viola
- Laura Garuti – viola
- Stefano Zanolli – viola
- Valentino Corvino – lead violin
- Davide Dondi – first violin
- Davide Gaspari – first violin
- Elicia Silverstein – first violin
- Federico Braga – first violin
- Gabriele Bellu – first violin
- Anton Berovski – second violin
- Keti Ikonomi – second violin
- David Caramia – second violin
- Silvia Mandolini – second violin
- Tommaso Luison – second violin
- Ugo Bongianni – programming, keyboards, grand piano, backing vocals
- Celeste Frigo – recording, mixing, mastering
- Davide Martini – recording
- Pietro Giolito – recording
- Marco Borsatti – recording
- Alessandro Di Guglielmo – engineering
- Giuseppe Spada – graphics
- Mauro Balletti – illustration

== Charts ==
=== Weekly charts ===
Weekly chart performance for Mina Fossati
Chart (2019)	Peak position
Italian Albums (FIMI)	2
Italian Vinyl Albums (FIMI)	1
Swiss Albums (Schweizer Hitparade)	26

=== Year-end charts ===
2019 year-end chart performance for Mina Fossati
Chart (2019)	Position
Italian Albums (FIMI)	24

2020 year-end chart performance for Mina Fossati
Chart (2020)	Position
Italian Albums (FIMI)	88

== Certifications and sales ==
Certifications for Mina Fossati
Region	Certification	Certified units/sales
Italy (FIMI)	Platinum	50,000^{‡}
^{‡} Sales+streaming figures based on certification alone.
