= MinaCelentano – The Complete Recordings =

Compilation album by Mina and Adriano Celentano
- Released: 26 November 2021
- Recorded: 1998–2021
- Genre: Pop; rock
- Length: 79:53
- Language: Italian
- Label: PDU; Clan Celentano; Sony
- Producer: Massimiliano Pani; Claudia Mori

Mina chronology
Cassiopea (Italian Songbook) (2020)	MinaCelentano – The Complete Recordings (2021)	Encadenados (2022)

Adriano Celentano chronology
Adrian (2019)	MinaCelentano – The Complete Recordings (2021)

Singles from MinaCelentano – The Complete Recordings
- 1. "Niente è andato perso" Released: 26 November 2021

MinaCelentano – The Complete Recordings is a compilation album by Italian singers Mina and Adriano Celentano, released on 26 November 2021 by PDU, Clan Celentano and Sony Music.

== Overview ==
The release of the compilation is timed to coincide with the twenty-fifth anniversary of Mina and Celentano's first joint album, Mina Celentano, which was released in 1998, the record was a resounding success, reaching the top of the Italian charts and receiving two platinum certifications. In 2016, they released another studio album, Le migliori, which was able to repeat the success of its predecessor and even surpassed it, receiving seven platinums. Overall, this is the duo's fourth full-length release. The collection features 17 of the best tracks from two studio albums, the song "Eva" from the 2017 collection Tutte le migliori, as well as a brand new song called "Niente andato perso".

== Track listing ==
CD1
No.	Title	Writer(s)	Length
1.	"Niente è andato perso"	Fabio Ilacqua	4:08
2.	"Eva"	Andrea Gallo; Luigi De Rienzo	5:12
3.	"A un passo da te"	Ilacqua	4:31
4.	"Brivido felino"	Paolo Audino; Stefano Cenci	3:43
5.	"Ma che ci faccio qui"	Pietro Paletti	4:01
6.	"Acqua e sale"	Giovanni Donzelli; Vincenzo Leomporro	4:40
7.	"Amami amami"	Riccardo Sinigallia; Idan Raichel	3:18
8.	"È l'amore"	Andrea Mingardi; Maurizio Tirelli	3:39
9.	"Io non volevo"	Adriano Celentano	4:08
10.	"Come un diamante nascosto nella neve"	Marco Bruni	3:46
Total length:			41:06

CD2
No.	Title	Writer(s)	Length
1.	"Specchi riflessi"	Donzelli; Leomporro	4:57
2.	"Che t'aggia di'"	Celentano	5:08
3.	"Non mi ami"	Salvatore Marletta; Federico Spagnoli; Walter Dallari	3:59
4.	"Messaggio d'amore"	Massimiliano Pani	2:36
5.	"Sempre sempre sempre"	Luigi Albertelli; Enrico Riccardi	4:46
6.	"Se mi ami davvero"	Mondo Marcio	3:42
7.	"Ti lascio amore"	Toto Cutugno; Mario Culotta; Fabrizio Berlincioni	5:13
8.	"Sono le tre"	Luca Rustici; Philippe Leon	3:47
9.	"Dolce fuoco dell'amore"	Giulia Fasolino	4:39
Total length:			38:47

== Charts ==
Chart performance for MinaCelentano – The Complete Recordings
Chart (2021)	Peak position
Italian Albums (FIMI)	10
Italian Vinyl Albums (FIMI)	3
