= Caterpillar (Mina album) =

Studio album by Mina
- Released: 18 October 1991
- Recorded: 1991
- Studio: Studi PDU, Lugano
- Genre: Pop; rock; jazz
- Length: 82:25
- Language: Italian; English
- Label: PDU

Mina chronology
Ti conosco mascherina (1990)	Caterpillar (1991)	Sorelle Lumière (1992)

Caterpillar is a double studio album by Italian singer Mina, released on 18 October 1991 and distributed by EMI Italiana.

== Overview ==
The album, as usual, features a part with cover versions of famous world and Italian hits, originally released between 1927 (Hoagy Carmichael's "Stardust") and 1979 (Gianna Nannini's "California"), as well as a part with new original material.

The song "Il genio del bene" was used by Rete 4 as the theme song of the telenovela Vendetta di una donna starring Luisa Kuliok.

The album debuted at number fifteen on the Italian albums chart and peaked at number four in its fourth week, and stayed on the chart for a total of fifteen weeks. In the European albums chart, it became the fifty-second.

A remastered version of the album was released in 2001.

== Track listing ==
Volume 1
No.	Title	Writer(s)	Length
1.	"Stardust"	Hoagy Carmichael; Mitchell Parish	3:54
2.	"La casa del serpente"	Ivano Fossati	6:10
3.	"Canto (Anche se sono stonato)"	Leo Chiosso; Lelio Luttazzi	3:13
4.	"I'm a Fool To Care"	Ted Daffan	3:03
5.	"Love Me, Please Love Me"	Michel Polnareff; Frank Gerald	3:55
6.	"Doodlin'"	Horace Silver	4:36
7.	"California"	Gianna Nannini	5:29
8.	"Lo shampoo"	Giorgio Gaber	3:39
9.	"Love Me Tender"	Elvis Presley; Vera Matson	4:03
10.	"Legata ad uno scoglio"	Chiosso; Luttazzi	2:25
Total length:			40:29

Volume 2
No.	Title	Writer(s)	Length
1.	"Il corvo"	Marco Luberti	3:44
2.	"Acquolina"	Samuele Cerri; Roberto Costa	5:00
3.	"Lunarità"	Cerri; Fabio Sinigaglia	5:05
4.	"Flamenco"	Massimiliano Pani; Giorgio Calabrese; Massimo Bozzi	4:24
5.	"Traditore"	Giorgio Faletti	4:33
6.	"Fermi"	Cerri; Mauro Paoluzzi	4:49
7.	"Il genio del bene"	Maurizio Morante	4:07
8.	"L'indifferenza"	Silvestro Longo; Carlo Ambrosio	4:55
9.	"Amanti"	Gino De Nicola; Nicola Di Battista	5:15
Total length:			41:56

== Personnel ==
- Mina – vocals
- Danilo Rea – accordion, Hammond organ, piano
- Massimo Moriconi – acoustic bass
- Angel "Pato" Garcia – acoustic guitar
- Mario Robbiani – arrangement
- Massimiliano Pani – arrangement, backing vocals, keyboards
- Lele Cerri – backing vocals
- Margherita Ragnetti – backing vocals
- Massimo Bozzi – backing vocals, guitar, keyboards
- Moreno Ferrara – backing vocals
- Simonetta Robbiani – backing vocals
- Massimo Morriconi – bass
- Alfredo Golino – drums
- Ellade Bandini – drums
- Roberto Gatto – drums
- Franco Ambrosetti – flugelhorn
- Danilo Minotti – guitar
- Gigi Cifarelli – guitar
- Paolo Gianolio – guitar
- Sandro Gibellini – guitar
- Aldo Banfi – synclavier
- Candelo Cabezas – percussion
- Giancarlo Porro – saxophone
- Giovanni Troversi – saxophone
- Leonardo Prete – saxophone
- Maurizio Giammarco – saxophone
- Paolo Panigada – saxophone
- Sergio Rigon – saxophone
- Wally Allifranchini – saxophone
- Marco Tempesta – trombone
- Mauro Parodi – trombone
- Rudy Migliardi – trombone
- Emilio Soana – trumpet
- Fernando Brusco – trumpet
- Umberto Moretti – trumpet

Credits are adapted from the album's liner notes.

== Charts ==
Chart performance for Caterpillar
Chart (1991)	Peak position
European Albums (Music & Media)	52
Italian Albums (Musica e dischi)	4
