= L'allieva =

Studio album by Mina
- Released: 11 November 2005
- Recorded: 2005
- Studio: Studi GSU, Lugano
- Genre: Jazz
- Length: 62:42
- Label: PDU
- Producer: Massimiliano Pani

Mina studio albums chronology
Bula Bula (2005)	L'allieva (2005)	Bau (2006)

L'allieva is a studio album by Italian singer Mina, released on 11 November 2005 by PDU. The albums pays homage to the songs of Frank Sinatra, by whom Mina has been greatly influenced. The album reached the fourth place in the Italian chart, and its sales exceeded the threshold of 130 thousand copies.

The first 11 songs are accompanied by a small combo of jazz musicians, ending appropriately with "My Way", while the last 3 recordings are a sort of added bonus tracks, with orchestral strings arrangements by Gianni Ferrio.

== Critical reception ==
The Rockol reviewer Gianni Sibilla stated that this is a beautiful record, perfect for this autumn-winter period, with warm, beautifully arranged songs. Claudio Milano of OndaRock praised the album, but noted that this record should be listened to without the desire to resort to comparisons with the originals, given the huge discrepancy in the basic interpretative intentions, as if these were songs recorded for the first time. In 2018, Giorgio Moltisanti from Rolling Stone placed it on the 6th place in the list of Mina's most underrated albums. Moltisanti noted that the great feature of this CD, in addition to the indisputable value of the selected songs, is the gold of respect that shines through from the fourteen tracks included. Mina, in his opinion, interprets songs with measure and thrift, cleansing her style of excesses: Mina sometimes whispers, sighs, dreams, clearly reducing her ego by 4 octaves and 3 tones.

== Track listing ==
No.	Title	Writer(s)	Length
1.	"These Foolish Things (Remind Me of You)"	Eric Maschwitz; Jack Strachey	5:32
2.	"The Nearness of You"	Hoagy Carmichael; Ned Washington	3:28
3.	"Once I Loved (O Amor em Paz)"	Antônio Carlos Jobim; Vinícius de Moraes; Ray Gilbert	6:17
4.	"One for My Baby (and One More for the Road)"	Johnny Mercer; Harold Arlen	4:40
5.	"Angel Eyes"	Matt Dennis; Earl Brent	6:20
6.	"Blue Moon"	Richard Rodgers; Lorenz Hart	6:19
7.	"Strangers in the Night"	Eddie Snyder; Charlie Singleton; Bert Kaempfert	4:04
8.	"All the Way"	Jimmy Van Heusen; Sammy Cahn	4:42
9.	"Goodbye"	Gordon Jenkins	2:55
10.	"Dindi"	Jobim; Aloísio de Oliveira; Gilbert	4:53
11.	"My Way (Comme d’habitude)"	Gilles Thibault; Paul Anka; Claude François; Jacques Revaux	2:39
12.	"Only the Lonely"	Van Heusen; Cahn	4:32
13.	"April in Paris"	Vernon Duke; Yip Harburg	2:41
14.	"Laura"	Mercer; David Raksin	3:41
Total length:			62:46

== Charts ==
=== Weekly charts ===
Weekly chart performance for L'allieva
Chart (2005)	Peak position
Italian Albums (FIMI)	4

=== Year-end charts ===
Year-end chart performance for L'allieva
Chart (2005)	Position
Italian Albums (FIMI)	38
