= Ti conosco mascherina =

Studio album by Mina
- Released: 12 October 1990
- Recorded: 1990
- Studio: Studi PDU, Lugano
- Genre: Pop; rock; jazz
- Length: 86:37
- Language: Italian; English
- Label: PDU

Mina chronology
Uiallalla (1989)	Ti conosco mascherina (1990)	Caterpillar (1991)

Ti conosco mascherina is a double studio album by Italian singer Mina, released on 12 October 1990 by PDU and distributed by EMI Italiana.

== Overview ==
For this album, Mina again records cover versions of famous songs that are placed on the first volume. Among others, there are cover versions of the songs "Caruso" by Lucio Dalla, "Billie Jean" by Michael Jackson, "Fortissimo" by Rita Pavone and an Italian version of the French pop standard "Une belle histoire" called "Un'estate fa". There are new songs in the second volume of the album.

The illustrations for the album design, inspired by Picasso's work, were created by Mauro Balletti.

The album debuted at number three on the Italian albums chart, and spent a total of fourteen weeks there. The album reached the forty-eighth position in the overall European albums chart.

== Track listing ==
Volume 1
No.	Title	Writer(s)	Length
1.	"Caruso"	Lucio Dalla	4:13
2.	"Fortissimo"	Lina Wertmüller; Bruno Canfora	4:23
3.	"Billie Jean"	Michael Jackson	5:51
4.	"The Man I Love"	Ira Gershwin; George Gershwin	3:08
5.	"Malafemmena"	Antonio De Curtis	3:37
6.	"Zio Tom"	Fabio Concato	4:56
7.	"I Want to Be Free"	Jerry Leiber; Mike Stoller	3:53
8.	"Un'estate fa (Une belle histoire)"	Pierre Delanoë; Franco Califano; Michel Fugain	4:06
9.	"Yeeeeh (Ain't Gonna Eat My Heart Out Anymore)"	Pam Sawyer; Sergio Bardotti; Lori Burton	3:44
10.	"Sono stanco"	Bruno Martino; Bruno Brighetti; Berto Pisano	3:58
Total length:			41:53

Volume 2
No.	Title	Writer(s)	Length
1.	"Ma chi è, cosa fa? (Partido alto)"	Chico Buarque de Hollanda; Giorgio Calabrese	4:43
2.	"Franz"	Samuele Cerri	4:26
3.	"Amornero"	Duchesca; Lucumone; Aldo Donati	5:05
4.	"Lo farei"	Victor Bach	4:38
5.	"Ganimede"	Cerri; Francesco Sandi	4:01
6.	"In vista della sera"	Camillo Castellari	5:11
7.	"Notte di San Valentino"	Enrico Riccardi	3:49
8.	"Non ci sono emozioni"	Massimiliano Pani	5:40
9.	"Nient'altro che felici"	Vanda Di Paolo; Sergio Laccone	5:18
10.	"Per una volta tanto"	Calabrese; Pani	2:25
Total length:			44:34

== Personnel ==
- Mina – vocals, backing vocals (2-4)
- Massimiliano Pani – arrangement (1-1, 1-3, 1-6–1-10, 2-1–2-3, 2-5, 2-6, 2-8–2-10), backing vocals (1-1–1-3, 1-7–1-10, 2-1, 2-3), keyboards (1-1–1-4, 1-6–1-10, 2-1, 2-2, 2-5, 2-6, 2-8–2-10), mixing (2-4, 2-7, 2-10), programming (1-3, 2-1, 2-6), vocals (1-2)
- Victor Bach – arrangement (2-4), keyboards (2-4), backing vocals (2-4)
- Enrico Riccardi – arrangement (2-7), keyboards (2-7)
- Davide Piazza – backing vocals (1-1)
- Filippo Bernardinello – backing vocals (1-1)
- Gabriella Herklotz – backing vocals (1-1)
- Gianni Demarin – backing vocals (1-1)
- Jean-Claude Burri – backing vocals (1-1)
- Margherita Ragneti – backing vocals (1-1)
- Mario Fabrini – backing vocals (1-1)
- Massimo Bozzi – backing vocals (1-1–1-3, 1-7–1-10, 2-1), programming (1-9, 2-2, 2-3, 2-5, 2-6, 2-7, 2-9), guitar (2-6), keyboards (2-7)
- Matteo Marini – backing vocals (1-1)
- Matteo Piazza – backing vocals (1-1)
- Moreno Ferrara – backing vocals (1-1–1-3, 1-7–1-10, 2-1)
- Orio Soldini – backing vocals (1-1)
- Regina Paganin – backing vocals (1-1)
- Simonetta Robbiani – backing vocals (1-1–1-3, 1-7–1-10, 2-1)
- Ugo Norsa – backing vocals (1-1)
- Mario Robbiani – backing vocals (1-1, 1-7–1-10, 2-1)
- Massimo Moriconi – bass (1-1, 1-6–1-10, 2-3–2-5, 2-8), double bass (1-2, 1-4, 2-9)
- Riccardo Fioravanti – bass (2-1, 2-6)
- Ellade "Guru" Bandini – drums (1-1, 1-2, 1-4, 1-6, 1-7, 1-9, 2-3, 2-5, 2-8, 2-9)
- Nuccio Rinaldis – engineering (1-1, 1-2, 1-4, 1-5, 1-7–1-9, 2-1, 2-2, 2-6, 2-8)
- Fabrizio Rovelli – engineering (1-3, 2-4, 2-7, 2-10), mixing (2-4, 2-7, 2-10), recording
- Piero Bravin – engineering (1-6, 2-3, 2-5, 2-9)
- Kiko Berta – engineering (1-9, 2-1)
- Franco Ambrosetti – flugelhorn (1-2, 1-7)
- Paolo Gianolio – guitar (1-1–1-4, 1-6–1-10, 2-1, 2-3, 2-5, 2-8, 2-9)
- Gigi Cifarelli – guitar (2-2, 2-6)
- Danilo Minotti – guitar (2-4)
- Danilo Rea – keyboards (1-1, 1-2, 1-4, 1-6–1-10, 2-3, 2-5, 2-6, 2-8–2-10)
- Roberto Costa – mixing (1-1–1-10, 2-1, 2-2, 2-3, 2-5, 2-6, 2-8, 2-9), recording
- Candelo Cabezas – percussion (1-7–1-10, 2-1, 2-2, 2-6, 2-8)
- Renato Sellani – piano (1-5)
- Massimo Bozzi – programming (1-1)
- Gianni Plutino – programming (2-4)
- Kenny Garrett – alto saxophone (1-6, 2-3, 2-6)
- Giancarlo Porro – baritone saxophone (1-9)
- Wally Allifranchini – soprano saxophone (1-1, 1-2, 1-8, 2-8), alto saxophone (1-9, 1-10), tenor saxophone (1-10)
- Aldo Banfi – synthesizer (1-1, 1-3, 1-4, 1-6, 1-7, 1-9, 1-10, 2-1–2-3, 2-5, 2-6, 2-8, 2-9)
- Mauro Parodi – trombone (1-9, 1-10)
- Fernando Brusco – trumpet (1-9, 1-10)
- Mauro Balletti – creative direction, realization, cover art, illustration (drawings)

Credits are adapted from the album's liner notes.

== Charts ==
Chart performance for Ti conosco mascherina
Chart (1990)	Peak position
European Albums (Music & Media)	48
Italian Albums (Musica e dischi)	3
