= Bau (album) =

Studio album by Mina
- Released: 26 November 2006
- Recorded: 2006
- Studio: Studi GSU, Lugano
- Genre: Pop; rock
- Length: 59:57
- Language: Italian; English
- Label: PDU
- Producer: Massimiliano Pani

Mina chronology
Ti amo... (2006)	Bau (2006)	Todavía (2007)

Singles from Bau
- 1. "Mogol Battisti"; 2. "Alibi"

Bau is a studio album by Italian singer Mina, released on 26 November 2006 by PDU and distributed by Sony Music.

The album was first released in a limited edition on vinyl in 2023.

== Track listing ==
No.	Title	Writer(s)	Length
1.	"Mogol Battisti"	Andrea Mingardi; Maurizio Tirelli	4:04
2.	"Sull'Orient Express"	Mingardi; Tirelli	3:48
3.	"Johnny scarpe gialle"	Mingardi; Tirelli	4:54
4.	"Nessun altro mai"	Mingardi; Tirelli	4:32
5.	"Alibi"	Ania Cecilia; Luca Rustici	3:42
6.	"Per poco che sia"	Samuele Cerri; Mattia Gysi; Axel Pani	3:29
7.	"The end"	Mingardi; Tirelli	3:47
8.	"Un uomo che mi ama"	Maurizio Morante	6:18
9.	"L'amore viene e se ne va"	Mingardi; Tirelli	4:40
10.	"Fai la tua vita"	Giancarlo Bigazzi; Marco Falagiani	5:05
11.	"Inevitabile"	Mingardi; Tirelli	4:48
12.	"Come te lo devo dire"	Agostino Guarino	4:50
13.	"Datemi della musica"	Mingardi	5:38
Total length:			59:57

== Musicians ==
Arrangements

- Ugo Bongianni - arrangements (tracks 3, 8, 10, 11, 12, 13
- Nicolò Fragile - arrangements (tracks 1)
- Massimiliano Pani - arrangements tracks 2, 4, 5, 6, 7, 9)

Musicians

- Mina - vocals
- Ugo Bongianni - keyboards
- Danilo Rea - piano
- Faso, Lorenzo Poli - bass
- Lele Melotti - percussion
- Vincenzo Bramanti, Luca Meneghello - guitar
- Gabriele Comeglio - aerophone arrangements, flutes and clarinet
- Emilio Soana, Pippo Colucci, Umberto Mercandalli - trumpet
- Mauro Parodi, Angelo Rolando - trombones
- Paolo Barbieri, Gabriele Comeglio - saxophone
- Emilio Soana - flugelhorn
- Andrea Mingardi - vocals ("Mogol Battisti", "Datemi della musica")
- Giulia Fasolino, Antonio Galbiati, Stefania Martin, Massimiliano Pani - backing vocals

== Charts ==
=== Weekly charts ===
Weekly chart performance for Bau
Chart (2006–2007)	Peak position
Greek Albums (IFPI Greece)	42
Italian Albums (FIMI)	5

=== Year-end charts ===
Year-end chart performance for Bau
Chart (2006)	Position
Italian Albums (FIMI)	34

== Certifications ==
Region	Certification	Certified units/sales
Italy (FIMI)	2× Platinum	160,000^{*}
^{*} Sales figures based on certification alone.
