= Leggera (album) =

- Artwork for CD edition

Studio album by Mina
- Released: 17 October 1997
- Recorded: 1997
- Studio: Studi GSU, Lugano, Switzerland; Abbey Road Studios, London, United Kingdom
- Genre: Pop; rock; jazz
- Length: 55:47
- Language: Italian; English
- Label: PDU
- Producer: Massimiliano Pani

Mina chronology
Napoli (1996)	Leggera (1997)	Mina Celentano (1998)

Professional ratings
Review scores
Source	Rating
AllMusic	4.5/5 stars

Leggera is a studio album by Italian singer Mina, released on 17 October 1997 by PDU.

== Critical reception ==
Mario Luzzatto Fegiz of Corriere della Sera noted that it is "a good, diverse, funny, believable disc created to once again demonstrate the virtuoso Mina's capabilities, although it is probably a little less commercial than the previous album Cremona."

== Track listing ==
No.	Title	Writer(s)	Length
1.	"Johnny"	Giulia Fasolino	4:53
2.	"Someday in My Life" (featuring Mick Hucknall)	Mick Hucknall	4:02
3.	"Suona ancora" (featuring Le Voci Atroci)	Fernando Masi; Alioscia Bisceglia; Giuliano Palma; Michele Pauli; Alessio Argenteri	4:24
4.	"Con te sarà diverso"	Fabrizio Berlincioni; Mauro Culotta	4:32
5.	"Resta lì"	Samuele Cerri; Santoro; Massimiliano Pani	4:45
6.	"Clark Kent"	Fratelli Margiotta	4:38
7.	"Non si può morire in eterno"	Adelio Cogliati; Franco Fasano	3:41
8.	"Noi soli insieme"	Alberto Salerno; Culotta	4:38
9.	"Tre volte dentro me (Dentro Marilyn)"	Manuel Agnelli	5:47
10.	"Stai così"	Filippo Trojani	4:32
11.	"Grigio"	Roberto Pacco	4:32
Total length:			55:47

In the song "Grigio" there is a so-called hidden track "Suona ancora" (Mina's solo version), at the end of which you can hear the door open and a male voice says "Permesso?" (May I?). This voice belongs to Adriano Celentano, and the situation itself is a hint of a joint album Mina Celentano, which will be released in 1998.

== Personnel ==
- Mina – vocals (all tracks)
- Mick Hucknall – vocals (2)
- Le Voci Atroci – vocals (3)
- Danilo Rea – piano, Rhodes piano, Hammond organ
- Massimiliano Pani – electronic keyboard, background vocals
- Alfredo Golino – drums
- Massimo Moriconi – bass
- Umberto Fiorentino – guitar
- Lorenzo Malacrida – percussion
- Giorgio Cocilovo – electric guitar
- Paolo Gianolio – acoustic guitar, electric guitar
- Nicolò Fragile – electronic keyboard
- Gogo Ghidelli – guitar
- Cesare Chiodo – bass
- Massimo Varini – guitar
- Gabriele Comeglio – soprano saxophone
- Giulia Fasolino – background vocals
- Paola Folli – background vocals
- Simonetta Robbiani – background vocals
- Moreno Ferrara – background vocals

== Charts ==
Chart performance for Leggera
Chart (1997)	Peak position
European Albums (Music & Media)	28
Italian Albums (Musica e dischi/FIMI)	1
