= Napoli (album) =

Studio album by Mina
- Released: 28 November 1996
- Recorded: 1996
- Studios: Studi GSU, Lugano
- Genres: Canzone napoletana; jazz
- Length: 43:16
- Language: Neapolitan
- Label: PDU

Mina chronology
Cremona (1996)	Napoli (1996)	Minantologia (1997)

Napoli is a studio album by Italian singer Mina, released on 28 November 1996 by PDU. It features Neapolitan songs interpreted by Mina. The album became number four on the Italian albums chart (number two according to FIMI) and received positive reviews.

The songs "Passione" and "Voce 'e notte" were already recorded in 1961.

In the same year, the album was reissued in a deluxe edition of Natale 1996, which also included the album Cremona.

== Critical reception ==
Federico Vacalebre from Il Mattino noted that Napoli is an elegant interpretation of Parthenopean melodies and the most beautiful Mina's record of the nineties. Marco Molendini also stated that this is one of Mina's best works, in which she shows herself as an impeccable vocalist. Ernesto Assante from La Repubblica notes that the record is more than jazz, it is richer and more passionate. Claudio Milano from OndaRock wrote that Mina offers arrangements of priceless sophistication and exciting vocal versions accompanied by an amazing string choir.

== Track listing ==
No.	Title	Writer(s)	Length
1.	"Aggio perduto 'o suonno"	Gino Redi; Alvise Natili	5:27
2.	"Amaro è 'o bene"	Salvatore Palomba; Sergio Bruni	3:12
3.	"Quanno chiove"	Pino Daniele	3:33
4.	"Passione"	Libero Bovio; Nicola Valente; Ernesto Tagliaferri	3:28
5.	"Je sto vicino a te"	Daniele	5:58
6.	"Nun è peccato"	Ugo Calise; Carlo Alberto Rossi	4:55
7.	"Voce 'e notte"	Edoardo Nicolardi; Ernesto De Curtis	6:17
8.	"Maruzzella"	Enzo Bonagura; Renato Carosone	3:29
9.	"Core 'ngrato"	Alessandro Sisca; Salvatore Cardillo	2:17
10.	"Indifferentemente"	Umberto Martucci; Salvatore Mazzocco	4:38
Total length:			43:16

== Personnel ==
- Mina – vocals
- Massimo Moriconi – double bass
- Maurizio Dei Lazzaretti – drums
- Sandro Gibellini – guitar
- Naco – percussion
- Danilo Rea – piano
- Franco Ambrosetti – saxhorn
- Gabriele Comeglio – saxophone
- Emilio Soana – tromba
- Giuseppe Di Stefano - trombone
- Mauro Parodi – trombone
- Pippo Colucci - trumpet
- Umberto Marcandalli – trumpet

Credits are adapted from the album's liner notes.

== Charts ==
Chart performance for Napoli
Chart (1996)	Peak position
European Albums (Music & Media)	29
Italian Albums (FIMI)	2
Italian Albums (Musica e dischi)	4
