= Ridi pagliaccio =

Studio album by Mina
- Released: 20 October 1988
- Recorded: 1988
- Studio: Studi PDU, Lugano
- Genre: Pop; rock; jazz
- Length: 81:20
- Language: Italian; English
- Label: PDU

Mina chronology
Oggi ti amo di più (1988)	Ridi pagliaccio (1988)	Uiallalla (1989)

Ridi pagliaccio is a double studio album by Italian singer Mina, released on 20 October 1988 by PDU and distributed by EMI Italiana.

== Overview ==
With this album, the singer celebrated the thirtieth anniversary of her creative activity.

The album was released as a double on vinyl, cassette and CD in two volumes as usual. Separately it was distributed only on cassettes. The album debuted at number five on the Italian albums chart. In its third week, it peaked at number two. The album spent fifteen weeks in the top ten, and nineteen weeks in total on the chart. On the pan-European Music & Media' chart, the album rose to the fifty-first position.

The cover art was created by Mauro Baletti. In 2018, especially for Vogue magazine, the most vivid images of Mina were recreated, including the cover of the album Ridi pagliaccio. The model was Karen Elson.

== Track listing ==
Volume 1
No.	Title	Lyrics	Music	Length
1.	"Il portiere di notte"	Enrico Ruggeri	Ruggeri	5:37
2.	"Moody's Mood"	Eddie Jefferson	James Moody	2:27
3.	"Canzoni stonate"	Mogol	Aldo Donati	3:53
4.	"This Masquerade"	Leon Russell	Russell	4:23
5.	"Into the Groove"	Madonna	Stephen Bray	5:02
6.	"It's Impossible (Somos novios)"	Sid Wayne	Armando Manzanero	2:57
7.	"Un'ora"	Antonio Amurri	Bruno Canfora	3:27
8.	"You'll Never Never Know"	Paul Robi; Tony Williams; Jean Miles	Robi; Williams; Miles	2:53
9.	"La compagnia"	Mogol	Carlo Donida Labati	5:02
10.	"I Left My Heart in San Francisco"	Douglass Cross	George Cory	3:10
11.	"Noi due nel mondo e nell'anima"	Valerio Negrini	Roby Facchinetti	4:25
Total length:				43:16

Volume 2
No.	Title	Lyrics	Music	Length
1.	"Ridi pagliaccio"	Ruggero Leoncavallo	Leoncavallo	2:12
2.	"Das Kind ist in dem Teller"		Massimiliano Pani	1:12
3.	"Lui, lui, lui"	Paolo Limiti	Pani	4:16
4.	"È Natale"	Valentino Alfano	Pani	4:20
5.	"L'ultimo gesto di un clown"	Limiti; Moreno Ferrara	Gianfranco Fasano	4:03
6.	"Dalai"	Samuele Cerri	Randy Jackson	3:51
7.	"Un tipo indipendente"	Pani; Alberto De Martini	Pani	5:03
8.	"Cuore, amore, cuore"	Limiti	Pani	4:25
9.	"Bignè"	Alfano	Pino Presti	4:06
10.	"Rimani qui"	Giorgio Calabrese	Randy Jackson	4:16
Total length:				37:44

== Personnel ==
- Mina – vocals, backing vocals
- Massimo Moriconi – arrangement, double bass
- Massimiliano Pani – arrangement, backing vocals, guitar, programming, keyboards
- Franco Serafini – arrangement, drums
- Mario Robbiani – arrangement, strings
- Ellade Bandini – drums
- Paolo Gianolio – guitar
- Renato Sellani – piano
- Flaviano Cuffari – drums
- Angel "Pato" Garcia – guitar
- Walter Scebran – drums
- Giovanni Tommaso – bass guitar
- Alessandro Gallo – guitar
- Claudio Wally Allifranchini – saxophone, flute
- Cecilia Chailly – harp
- Piero Cassano – backing vocals
- Samuele Cerri – backing vocals
- Simonetta Giribone – backing vocals
- Moreno Ferrara – backing vocals

== Charts ==
Chart performance for Ridi pagliaccio
Chart (1988)	Peak position
European Albums (Music & Media)	51
Italian Albums (Musica e dischi)	2
