= Maeba =

Maeba is a surname. Notable people with the surname include:

- Kazuya Maeba (前場 一也), Japanese Paralympic athlete
- Lee Maeba (born 1966), Nigerian politician
- Maeba Yoshitsugu (前波 吉継; 1541–1574), Japanese samurai

== See also ==
- Maeba, studio album of italian singer Mina of 2018.
