= Amanti di valore =

Studio album by Mina
- Released: 22 October 1973
- Recorded: 1973
- Studio: La Basilica, Milan
- Genre: Pop
- Length: 38:56
- Language: Italian
- Label: PDU

Mina chronology
Frutta e verdura (1973)	Amanti di valore (1973)	Evergreens (1974)

Amanti di valore is a studio album by Italian singer Mina, released in October 1973 by PDU and originally distributed by EMI Italiana as a double album along with Frutta e verdura.

== Overview ==
The album's songs are dedicated to love and sex. Mina, again going against the flow, relies on the lyrics of the promising author Franco Califano, who describes without taboos the relationship between two adulterers ("Amanti di valore") or the absurd erotic games that she learns to please her man, thereby losing the natural spontaneity and naivety associated with the act of love ("Inibizioni al vento").

"Carlo detto il mandrillo" differs in that Mina does not perform the lead vocal part, but sounds like part of the choir. This is a song about a man overwhelmed with excessive passion in search of a woman. The song was removed from foreign releases due to censorship.

== Track listing ==
All lyrics are written by Franco Califano; all music is composed by Carlo Pes.

Side A
No.	Title	Length
1.	"Amanti di valore"	4:22
2.	"La vita goccia a goccia"	4:32
3.	"Ieri, ieri"	3:59
4.	"I sogni di un semplice"	5:04
5.	"La solita storia d'amore"	3:33
6.	"Un po' d'uva"	0:28
Total length:		21:58

Side B
No.	Title	Length
1.	"Il poeta che non pensa mai"	3:59
2.	"La mia vecchiaia"	3:14
3.	"Carlo detto il mandrillo"	2:57
4.	"Inibizioni al vento"	4:00
5.	"Ninna nanna amore stanco"	2:48
Total length:		16:58

== Personnel ==
- Mina – vocals
- Pino Presti – arrangement, bass, Rhodes piano, percussion
- Carlo Pes – arrangement, acoustic guitar, electric guitar, twelve-string guitar, mixing
- Dario Baldan Bembo – organ, electric piano, piano, eminent
- Renzo Bergonzi – percussion
- Bruno De Filippi – harmonica
- Tullio De Piscopo – drums, conga
- Lino Liguori – drums
- Arturo Prestipino Giarritta – violin
- Andrea Sacchi – electric guitar, classical guitar, lap steel guitar
- Nuccio Rinaldis – sound engineering
- Mauro Balletti – photography
- Luciano Tallarini – artwork, design

Credits are adapted from the album's liner notes.

== Charts ==
=== Weekly charts ===
Weekly chart performance for Amanti di valore and Frutta e verdura
Chart (1974)	Peak position
Italian Albums (Billboard)	2
Italian Albums (Musica e dischi)	1

Chart performance for Amanti di valore
Chart (1974)	Peak position
Italian Albums (Musica e dischi)	3

=== Monthly charts ===
Monthly chart performance for Amanti di valore and Frutta e verdura
Chart (1974)	Peak position
Italian Albums (Musica e dischi)	1
