= Acqua e sale =

Song by Mina and Adriano Celentano

from the album Mina Celentano
- Released: 1998
- Genre: Pop
- Songwriters: Gianni Donzelli; Vincenzo Leomporro
- Producer: Massimiliano Pani

"Acqua e sale" (English: "Water and Salt") is a song written by Gianni Donzelli and Vincenzo Leomporro from the Italian band Audio 2. It was recorded by singers Mina and Adriano Celentano in 1998 for their collaborative album Mina Celentano, and was produced by Mina's son Massimiliano Pani. It was certified gold record in the Italian charts in 2017 and platinum record in 2019.

Mina would later re-record the song in Spanish with Miguel Bosé, as "Agua y sal". It is included in Mina's and Bosé's respective 2007 albums Todavía and Papito.

== Charts ==
Chart performance for "Acqua e sale"
Chart (2012)	Peak position
Italy (FIMI)	88

== Certifications ==
Certifications for "Acqua e sale"
Region	Certification	Certified units/sales
Italy (FIMI) Sales since 2009	2× Platinum	100,000^{‡}
^{‡} Sales+streaming figures based on certification alone.
