= Rane supreme =

- Volume 1 cover

Studio album by Mina
- Released: 17 October 1987
- Recorded: 1987
- Studio: Studi PDU, Lugano
- Genre: Pop; rock
- Length: 77:56
- Language: Italian; English
- Label: PDU
- Producer: Massimiliano Pani

Mina chronology
Del mio meglio n. 9 (1987)	Rane supreme (1987)	Oggi ti amo di più (1988)

Alternative cover
- Volume 2 cover

Rane supreme is a studio album by Italian singer Mina, released on 17 October 1987 by PDU and distributed by EMI Italiana.

== Overview ==
On the first volume of the album, Mina presents her interpretations of songs by other artists. Among them: "Nessun dolore" by Lucio Battisti, in this song the singer demonstrates her wide vocal range, "Sorry Seems to Be the Hardest Word" by Elton John and "Careless Whisper" by George Michael. The song "Gloria" was already recorded by Mina for the album Due note (1961). There are new songs on the second volume.

As usual, the album was released in the fall, again as a double album on vinyl and in two volumes on CD and cassette. The album entered the top five of the chart in Italy.

For the recording of this album, Mina received the Targa Tenco prize as the best performer.

== Track listing ==
Volume 1
No.	Title	Lyrics	Music	Length
1.	"Careless Whisper"	George Michael	Andrew Ridgeley	6:06
2.	"Nessun dolore"	Mogol	Lucio Battisti	4:16
3.	"Gloria"	Leon René	René	2:55
4.	"Luna lunera"	Tony Fergo	Fergo	4:00
5.	"Scrivimi"	Enrico Frati	Giovanni Raimondo	4:47
6.	"My Cherie Amour"	Henry Cosby	Stevie Wonder; Cosby; Sylvia Moy	3:14
7.	"Sorry Seems to Be the Hardest Word"	Elton John; Bernie Taupin	John	3:51
8.	"You Make Me Feel Brand New" (with Samuele Cerri)	Linda Creed	Thom Bell; Creed	5:17
Total length:				34:28

Volume 2
No.	Title	Lyrics	Music	Length
1.	"Proprio come sei"	Samuele Cerri	Massimiliano Pani	4:05
2.	"Mappamondo"	Valentino Alfano	Mario Robbiani	3:20
3.	"Per avere te"	Giorgio Calabrese	Carlo Pes	5:33
4.	"Ma chi è quello lì"	Michele Schembri	Giuseppe Chierchia; Michele Schembri	4:24
5.	"Mi manchi tu"	Calabrese	Gianfranco Fornaciari	4:42
6.	"Serpenti"	Cerri	Pani	3:24
7.	"Tu vuoi lei"	Oscar Avogadro	Alberto Radius	4:17
8.	"Tu con me"	Giancarlo Colonnello	Luigi Albertelli; Colonnello	3:49
9.	"Certo su di me"	Pani; Alberto De Martini	Pani	4:27
10.	"Legittime curiosità"	Calabrese	Salvatore Vitale	5:19
Total length:				43:28

== Personnel ==
- Mina – vocals, background vocals
- Massimiliano Pani – background vocals, bass guitar, guitar
- Samuele Cerri – background vocals
- Pino Presti – background vocals
- Moreno Ferrara – background vocals
- Mario Robbiani – background vocals, strings
- Paolo Gianolio – bass guitar, guitar, electronic keyboard
- Massimo Moriconi – bass guitar
- Ellade Bandini – drums
- Flaviano Cuffari – drums
- Stefano Previsti – electronic keyboard
- Sergio Farina – guitar
- Alberto Radius – guitar
- Stefano Trevisti – keyboards
- Franco Serafini – piano, Rhodes piano
- Renato Sellani – piano
- Nuccio Rinaldis – recording, mixing
- Amedeo Bianchi – saxophone

Credits are adapted from the album's liner notes.

== Charts ==
Chart performance for Rane supreme
Chart (1987)	Peak position
European Albums (Music & Media)	86
Italian Albums (Billboard)	7
Italian Albums (Musica e dischi)	5
