= Uiallalla =

Studio album by Mina
- Released: 14 October 1989
- Recorded: 1989
- Studio: Studio GSU, Lugano
- Genre: Pop; rock
- Length: 74:36
- Language: Italian; English; French
- Label: PDU
- Producer: Massimiliano Pani

Mina chronology
Ridi pagliaccio (1988)	Uiallalla (1989)	Ti conosco mascherina (1990)

Uiallalla is a studio album by Italian singer Mina, released on 14 October 1989 by PDU and distributed by EMI Italiana.

The first of the two discs features cover versions of songs by other artists like "Oh! Darling" by the Beatles, "Les cornichons" and "La pelle nera" by Nino Ferrer, "Sarà per te" by Francesco Nuti, and "Io vorrei... non vorrei... ma se vuoi" by Lucio Battisti. The second disc featured original songs.

The album went on sale as a double album on vinyl, CDs and cassettes, it is noteworthy that unlike its predecessors, it was not distributed in separate parts. The album reached number four in the Italian album chart, as well as number sixty-seven in the pan-European chart.

== Track listing ==
Vol. 1
No.	Title	Writer(s)	Length
1.	"La pelle nera / Johnny B. Goode / Black Betty / Angeli negri (Angelitos negros)"	Nino Ferrer / Chuck Berry / Lead Belly /: Gian Carlo Testoni; Alberto Larici; Andrés Eloy Blanco; Manuel Álvarez Maciste	6:54
2.	"Una lunga storia d'amore"	Gino Paoli	3:29
3.	"Les cornichons"	Ferrer; James Booker	3:02
4.	"When Your Lover Has Gone"	Einar Aaron Swan	2:30
5.	"Oh! Darling"	John Lennon; Paul McCartney	3:35
6.	"Io vorrei... non vorrei... ma se vuoi..."	Mogol; Lucio Battisti
7.	"Are You Lonesome Tonight?"	Roy Turk; Lou Handman	2:57
8.	"Sarà per te"	Riccardo Mariotti	5:04
9.	"Chitarra suona più piano" (with Ángel "Pato" García)	Franca Evangelisti; Marcello Marrocchi; Nicola Di Bari	3:18
10.	"As Time Goes By"	Herman Hupfeld	3:58
Total length:			37:58

Vol. 2
No.	Title	Writer(s)	Length
1.	"La montagna"	Piergiorgio Benda	3:54
2.	"Lo faresti"	Aldo Donati; Paolo Limiti	4:12
3.	"Bachelite"	Francesco Salvi	4:42
4.	"Canterò per te"	Gatto Panceri	4:15
5.	"Che nome avrà"	Limiti; Morris Albert	4:49
6.	"Il plaid" (feat. Toots Thielemans)	Giorgio Conte	2:40
7.	"Tre volte sì"	Giorgio Calabrese; Massimiliano Pani	5:20
8.	"Uscita 29"	Calabrese; Pani	3:43
9.	"T.I.R."	Giorgio Conte	3:01
Total length:			36:38

== Personnel ==
- Mina – vocals
- Brian Auger – Hammond organ, piano
- Gigi Cappellotto – bass guitar
- Flaviano Cuffari – drums
- Ellade Bandini – drums
- Gigi Cifarelli – guitar
- Aldo Banfi – keyboard, synthesizer
- Danilo Rea – piano, keyboard
- Piergiorgio Benda – piano
- Angel "Pato" Garcia – guitar
- Alessio Tonini – guitar
- Candelo Cabezas – percussion, tumba
- Paolo Gianolio – bass guitar, guitar
- Giorgio Conte – guitar
- Massimiliano Pani – keyboard, background vocals
- Massimo Luca – guitar
- Tullio De Piscopo – drums, percussion
- Mario Robbiani – piano, Rhodes piano
- Massimo Moriconi – bass guitar, double bass
- Franco Serafini – piano, keyboard, Rhodes piano
- Fernando Brusco – trumpet
- Mauro Parodi – trombone
- Moreno Fassi – trombone
- Franco Ambrosetti – saxhorn
- Claudio Wally Allifranchini – flute, tenor saxophone, soprano saxophone
- Giancarlo Porro – baritone saxophone
- Toots Thielemans – harmonica, whistling, guitar
- Paola Folli – background vocals
- Laura Marcora – background vocals
- Moreno Ferrara – background vocals

== Charts ==
Chart performance for Uiallalla
Chart (1989)	Peak position
European Albums (Music & Media)	67
Italian Albums (Musica e dischi)	4
