= Bula Bula =

Studio album by Mina
- Released: 13 January 2005
- Recorded: 2004
- Studio: Studio 2 Radio Svizzera, Lugano
- Genre: Pop
- Length: 53:11
- Language: Italian
- Label: PDU; Sony
- Producer: Massimiliano Pani

Mina studio albums chronology
Napoli secondo estratto (2003)	Bula Bula (2005)	L'allieva (2005)

Bula Bula is a studio album by Italian singer Mina, released in 2005 by PDU and Sony Music. The album debuted at number one on the Italian albums chart, and its annual sales amounted to 130 thousand copies.

== Track listing ==
No.	Title	Writer(s)	Length
1.	"Vai e vai e vai"	Nicolò Fragile	4:15
2.	"Portati via"	Stefano Borgia	3:54
3.	"Fragile"	Gennaro Parlato; Leonardo Abbate; Tiziano Borghi	3:40
4.	"Se"	Alex Britti	4:31
5.	"Fra mille anni"	Daniel Vuletic; Alfredo Rapetti	4:26
6.	"La fin des vacances"	Henri Salvador; Boris Vian	4:20
7.	"Sei o non sei"	Valentino Alfano; Piero Cassano; Massimiliano Pani	3:46
8.	"20 parole"	Roberto Roversi; Alberto Ravasini	3:08
9.	"Bell'animalone"	Marzio Sandro Biancolino; Marco Fedrigo	4:08
10.	"Dove sarai"	Antonio Elia; Fragile	4:34
11.	"Quella briciola di più"	Maria Enrica Andolfi	5:14
12.	"La fretta nel vestito"	Tullio Pizzorno	7:11
Total length:			53:11

== Personnel ==
- Mina – vocals
- Massimiliano Pani – arrangement (1–7, 9), keyboards (1, 3, 9), backing vocals (2, 5–7, 10), programming (3, 7), strings (4), guitar (9)
- Luca Meneghello – guitar (1–5, 7, 9–11), acoustic guitar (6)
- Celeste Frigo – mixing (1, 8, 9, 10, 12)
- Ugo Bongianni – piano (1), keyboards (5, 11, 12), Rhodes piano (9), arrangement (11), programming (11, 12)
- Roberto Vernetti – programming (1, 2, 5, 9, 11)
- Ignazio Morviducci – recording (1, 2, 4, 5, 7, 9–12), mixing (2–7)
- Davide Pagano – recording (1–5, 7, 8, 10, 11)
- Antonio Galbiati – backing vocals (2, 10)
- Giulia Fasolino – backing vocals (2, 6, 10)
- Faso – bass guitar (2–5, 7, 10, 11)
- Nicolò Fragile – programming (2–4, 7, 9), keyboards (2–4, 7, 8, 10), arrangement (3, 7, 8, 10), Rhodes piano (3), Hammond organ (5), strings (8, 10)
- Carmine Di – recording (2, 4, 6, 9, 10)
- Axel Pani – vocals (2)
- Gabriele Kamm – recording (4, 8, 10)
- Gabriele Comeglio – strings (4, 8, 10), arrangement (12), saxophone (12)
- Franco Ambrosetti – trumpet (4)
- Manù Cortesi – backing vocals (6)
- Massimo Bozzi – backing vocals (6)
- Massimo Moriconi – double bass (6)
- Maurizio Dei Lazzaretti – drums (6)
- Sandro Gibellini – electric guitar (6)
- Francesco Corvino – drums (8)
- Marco Kaserer – guitar (11)
- Tullio Pizzorno – arrangement (12)
- Mauro Parodi – trombone (12)
- Emilio Soana – trumpet (12)
- Alessandro Di Guglielmo – mastering
- Mauro Balletti – photography, cover art

Credits are adapted from the album's liner notes.

== Charts ==
=== Weekly charts ===
Weekly chart performance for Bula Bula
Chart (2005)	Peak position
Italian Albums (FIMI)	1
Swiss Albums (Schweizer Hitparade)	95

=== Year-end charts ===
Year-end chart performance for Bula Bula
Chart (2005)	Position
Italian Albums (FIMI)	24
