= Sorelle Lumière =

Studio album by Mina
- Released: 24 October 1992
- Recorded: 1992
- Studios: Studi PDU, Lugano
- Genres: Pop; rock
- Length: 88:54
- Languages: Italian; English; Spanish
- Label: PDU

Mina chronology
Caterpillar (1991)	Sorelle Lumière (1992)	Mina canta i Beatles (1993)

Sorelle Lumière is a double studio album by Italian singer Mina, released on 24 October 1992 by PDU and distributed by EMI Italiana.

== Overview ==
The album draws inspiration and pays homage to the Lumière brothers. The cover image sees the singer transformed into a film projector with two coils instead of hair, the gears in the brain and the images that arise from the eyes. The images on the inside of the disc sleeve sees Mina become "dark" and, looking in the mirror, notice a "M" drawn on her back, quote of the film M by Fritz Lang. The album's artwork was created by Mauro Baletti.

The song "Neve", which opens with a Gregorian chant, sees the beginning of a collaboration between Mina and Audio2. The song was also produced a short promotional video which featured Platinette as Rita Hayworth from The Lady from Shanghai, repeating the famous scene of the shooting in the mirror.

The album also covers three songs, "Come stai", "Non avere te" and "Robinson", originally released on Massimiliano Pani’s debut album, L'occasione (1991). "Come stai" was re-recorded as a duet with Pani for this album.

Sorelle Lumière debuted on the Italian album chart at number five and peaked at number four the following week, then continued to remain in the top ten for another seven weeks. In total, it spent sixteen weeks on the chart. It also peaked at number sixty on the European albums chart.

== Critical reception ==
Mario Luzzatto Fegiz from Corriere della Sera noted that "If the first volume is elegant, intense", then the second volume is "a firework of unpredictable invention, of complex stories, twisted, men who do not understand, of women who suffer, they get bored, they dream". La Stampa contributor Marinella Venegoni also wrote that in the first volume there is "more diverse and suffused atmospheres velvety", and in the second part "the broad melodies are full of sadness, moans of desperate women and love".

In 2018, Rolling Stone magazine placed it on the ninth place in the list of the most underrated Mina's albums.

== Track listing ==
Volume 1
No.	Title	Writer(s)	Length
1.	"Come mi vuoi"	Mariella Nava; Edoardo De Crescenzo	5:40
2.	"Un nuovo amico / E poi..."	Mogol; Riccardo Cocciante / Andrea Lo Vecchio; Shel Shapiro	4:11
3.	"Come stai?" (with Massimiliano Pani)	Massimiliano Pani; Giorgio Calabrese; Claudia Ferrandi	4:35
4.	"Cry Me a River"	Arthur Hamilton	5:22
5.	"Figlio unico (Trem das onze)"	João Rubinato; Riccardo Del Turco	3:51
6.	"Non avere te"	Pani; Calabrese; Massimo Bozzi	5:02
7.	"I ricordi della sera (È scesa malinconica la sera)"	Tata Giacobetti; Virgilio Savona	3:03
8.	"Cigarettes and Coffee"	Scialpi; Franco Migliacci	4:30
9.	"I'll Fly for You / Oye Como Va / Black Magic Woman"	Gary Kemp / Tito Puente / Peter Green; Gábor Szabó	4:03
10.	"Robinson"	Pani; Calabrese	2:25
Total length:			45:05

Volume 2
No.	Title	Writer(s)	Length
1.	"Anima nera"	Piero Cassano; Maurizio Morante; Pani	4:35
2.	"Se poi"	Carlo Marrale	5:43
3.	"Fuliggine"	Morante	4:05
4.	"Uomo ferito"	Valgaut	4:01
5.	"Quando finisce una canzone"	Morante; Sergio Farina	4:23
6.	"Neve"	Giovanni Donzelli; Vincenzo Leomporro	5:22
7.	"Amore, amore, amore mio"	Corrado Castellari; Giacinto De Mitri	5:00
8.	"Ancora un po'" (with Roberto Costa)	Francesco Giardinazzo; Roberto Costa	4:37
9.	"Voli di risposte"	Samuele Cerri	2:17
10.	"La follia"	Morante; Farina	3:38
Total length:			43:49

== Personnel ==
- Mina – vocals (all tracks), backing vocals (1-2, 1-5, 1-10, 2-3, 2-6)
- Sergio Farina – acoustic guitar (1-1 to 1-3, 1-5, 1-6, 1-8, 2-3 to 2-7), arrangement (2-5, 2-10)
- Massimiliano Pani – arrangement (1-1 to 1-6, 1-8 to 1-10, 2-1 to 2-4, 2-6 to 2-8), backing vocals (1-5 to 1-7, 1-9, 1-10, 2-1 to 2-3), keyboards (1-1 to 1-10, 2-1 to 2-4, 2-7, 2-8), mixing (1-4, 2-1, 2-6)
- Mario Robbiani – arrangement (1-1, 1-5, 1-7, 1-10, 2-1 to 2-3)
- Lele Cerri – backing vocals (1-6, 1-7, 1-9, 1-10, 2-1 to 2-3)
- Massimo Bozzi – backing vocals (1-5 to 1-7, 1-9, 1-10, 2-1 to 2-3), mixing (1-4, 2-1, 2-5, 2-6, 2-9, 2-10), programming (2-5, 2-10), recording (2-1 to 2-3, 2-6), recording add. (1-1, 2-7, 2-8)
- Moreno Ferrara – backing vocals (1-3, 1-6, 1-7, 1-9)
- Simonetta Robbiani – backing vocals (1-3, 1-5, 1-6, 1-7, 1-9, 1-10, 2-1 to 2-3)
- Massimo Moriconi – bass
- Ellade Bandini – drums (1-1 to 1-4, 1-6 to 1-10, 2-1, 2-3, 2-5, 2-6, 2-8 to 2-10)
- Roberto Gatto – drums (2-4, 2-7)
- Andrea Braido – guitar (1-1 to 1-3, 1-6, 1-9, 1-10, 2-1 to 2-4, 2-6 to 2-8)
- Sandro Gibellini – guitar (1-4, 1-7, 2-8)
- Marti Robertson – mixing (1-1 to 1-3, 1-5 to 1-10)
- Roberto Costa – mixing (2-3, 2-4, 2-7, 2-8)
- Jacinto Pereira De Tazza – percussion (1-1, 1-3, 1-8, 2-2, 2-8)
- Danilo Rea – piano
- Fabrizio Rovelli – recording (1-1 to 1-10, 2-1 to 2-10)
- Nuccio Rinaldis – recording (2-1, 2-3, 2-5, 2-8, 2-10)
- Maurizio Giammarco – saxophone (1-1, 1-2, 1-6, 1-8, 1-9, 2-2, 2-3, 2-6, 2-7)

Credits are adapted from the album's liner notes.

== Charts ==
Chart performance for Sorelle Lumière
Chart (1992)	Peak position
European Albums (Music & Media)	60
Italian Albums (Musica e dischi)	4
