= Matteo Mancini =

Most Reverend Matteo Mancini
- Bishop of Sora
- Church: Catholic Church
- Diocese: Diocese of Sora
- In office: 1503–1505
- Successor: Giacomo de Massimi

Personal details
- Died: 1505 Sora, Italy

Matteo Mancini (died 1505) was a Roman Catholic prelate who served as Bishop of Sora (1503–1505).

== Biography ==
On 7 June 1503, Matteo Mancini was appointed during the papacy of Pope Julius II as Bishop of Sora. He served as Bishop of Sora until his death in 1505.

== External links and additional sources ==
- Cheney, David M. "Diocese of Sora-Cassino-Aquino-Portecorvino". Catholic-Hierarchy.org. (for Chronology of Bishops) ^{[self-published]}
- Chow, Gabriel. "Diocese of Sora-Cassino-Aquino-Portecorvino (Italy)". GCatholic.org. (for Chronology of Bishops) ^{[self-published]}

Catholic Church titles
Preceded by	Bishop of Sora; 1503–1505	Succeeded by Giacomo de Massimi
