= E poi... =

Single by Mina

from the album Frutta e verdura
- Language: Italian
- B-side: "Non tornare più"
- Released: October 1973
- Genre: Pop
- Length: 4:47
- Label: PDU
- Composer: Shel Shapiro
- Lyricist: Andrea Lo Vecchio

Mina singles chronology
"Lamento d'amore" (1973)	"E poi..." (1973)	"Non gioco più" (1974)

"E poi..." (English: "And then...") is a song recorded by Italian singer Mina. It was released in October 1973 by PDU as a lead single from her studio album Frutta e verdura (1973). The song was written by Shel Shapiro and Andrea Lo Vecchio, and arranged by Pino Presti.

The song was a great success in Italy. In its third week on the chart, the song entered the top five. In early January, the song became number one and stayed there for nine consecutive weeks.

The song "Non tornare più" was used as a b-side. It was written by Franco Califano and Dario Baldan Bembo. The French version of the song titled "Les oiseaux revent" has also become a b-side for the single "Et puis ça sert à quoi".

In 1973 and 1975 "E poi..." was used in commercials for Tassoni lemonade.

== Other versions ==
"E poi..." was recorded in other languages: English ("Runaway", adapted lyrics by Shel Shapiro), Spanish ("¿Y que?", by Caruso Genfingal), French ("Et puis ça sert à quoi", by Pierre Delanoë), and German ("Und dann", by Bert Olden). The English version was released as a single in the United States and Canada, the French version in France, and the German version in West Germany. The Spanish version was not released as a single, but was included in the Spanish-language compilation Mina canta en español (1975). There are also two other Italian versions of the same song: in the live album Mina Live '78 and in 1992 album Sorelle Lumière, in which the song was mixed with Riccardo Cocciante's hit "Un nuovo amico".

== Track listing ==
7" single (Italy, Spain, France, Portugal)
A. "E poi..." – 4:48
B. "Non tornare più» (Dario Baldan Bembo, Franco Califano) — 4:43

7" single (North America, Netherlands)
A. "Runaway (E poi...)" – 4:48
B. "I Still Love You (Fate piano)» (Shel Shapiro, Andrea Lo Vecchio) — 4:10

7" single (France, Italy)
A. "Et puis ca sert à quoi (E poi...)" – 4:22
B. "Les oises revent (Non tornare più)» (Dario Baldan Bembo, Franco Califano, Pierre Delanoë) — 4:40

7" single (West Germany)
A. "Und Dann… (E poi...)" – 4:47
B. "Die Liebe am Sonntag (Domenica sera)» (Corrado Castellari, Bert Olden) — 2:56

== Personnel ==
- Mina – vocals
- Pino Presti – bass guitar, Rhodes piano, piano, arrangement
- Shel Shapiro – acoustic quitar
- Andrea Sacchi – electric quitar, acoustic quitar
- Fabio Treves – harmonica
- Tullio De Piscopo – drums, percussion
- Renè Mantegna – congas, percussion
- Nuccio Rinaldis – audio engineer

== Charts ==
Chart performance for "E poi..."
Chart (1974)	Peak position
Italy (Billboard)	7
Italy (Musica e dischi)	1

== Cover versions ==
- In 1974, Finnish singer Irina Milan recorded a Finnish version of the song for the album Milankolia called "Ja Silti Jään".
- In 1976, Welsh singer Shirley Bassey recorded an English version of the song, "Runaway", which became the B-side of her single "Natali".
