= Piccolino =

Studio album by Mina
- Released: 22 November 2011
- Genre: Pop; blues; electro dance; techno salsa
- Length: 43:12
- Language: Italian; English; Portuguese
- Label: PDU; Sony
- Producer: Massimiliano Pani

Mina studio albums chronology
Caramella (2010)	Piccolino (2011)	12 (American Song Book) (2012)

Piccolino is a studio album by Italian singer Mina. It was released by PDU and Sony Music on 22 November 2011. There are two versions of the album, the "standard edition" with 10 tracks, and the "deluxe edition" with those same songs plus 4 bonus tracks.

== Critical reception ==
Professional ratings
Review scores
Source	Rating
AllMusic	3.5/5 stars

Mariano Prunes from AllMusic stated that this is another fine, typical Mina release with stylish arrangements, and the focus, as always, is on Mina's voice and her interpretation of the material. Prunes also noted that she is magnificent on the ballads, but occasionally indulges in shrilling tones, as if she feels she needs to prove that the famous Cremona tigress still has claws. Marinella Venegoni of La Stampa wrote that Piccolino is the mood music of our bitter days.

== Track listing ==
Standard edition
No.	Title	Writer(s)	Length
1.	"Compagna di viaggio"	Giorgio Faletti	4:11
2.	"Matrioska"	Emilio Di Stefano; Franco Fasano	4:11
3.	"Questa canzone"	Paolo Limiti; Mario Nobile	3:23
4.	"Ainda Bem"	Marisa Monte; Arnaldo Antunes	4:10
5.	"Brucio di te"	Giuliano Sangiorgi	4:15
6.	"Canzone maledetta"	Maurizio Tirelli; Andrea Mingardi	4:18
7.	"L'uomo dell'autunno"	Giuseppe Fulcheri; Maurizio Fabrizio	4:42
8.	"Fuori città"	Matteo Mancini; Gianni Bindi	4:32
9.	"Fly Away"	Axel Pani; Mattia Gysi	4:06
10.	"E così sia"	Giuliano Sangiorgi	5:25
Total length:			43:12

Deluxe edition (bonus tracks)
No.	Title	Writer(s)	Length
11.	"Only This Song"	Pani	3:36
12.	"Rattarira"	Anselmo Genovese; Manuel Genovese	3:41
13.	"Armoniche convergenze"	Adelio Cogliati; Piero Cassano; Fabio Perversi	4:40
14.	"Dr. Roberto"	Stefano Gislon	4:08
Total length:			59:17

== Charts ==
=== Weekly charts ===
Weekly chart performance for Piccolino
Chart (2011)	Peak position
Italian Albums (FIMI)	6

=== Year-end charts ===
Year-end chart performance for Piccolino
Chart (2011)	Position
Italian Albums (FIMI)	49

== Certifications ==
Certifications for Piccolino
Region	Certification	Certified units/sales
Italy (FIMI)	Gold	30,000^{*}
^{*} Sales figures based on certification alone.
