= Cremona (album) =

Studio album by Mina
- Released: 18 September 1996
- Recorded: 1996
- Studio: Studi GSU, Lugano
- Genre: Pop; rock
- Length: 46:46
- Language: Italian
- Label: PDU

Mina chronology
Canzoni d'autore (1996)	Cremona (1996)	Napoli (1996)

Cremona is a studio album by Italian singer Mina, released on 18 September 1996 by PDU.

== Overview ==
For the first time in almost twenty years, the singer released an album consisting of only one disc; previously, Mina's albums were released in two parts: the first consisted of cover versions, and the second contained original tracks, this album consists entirely of new songs. The name of the album Cremona is a reference to the city of Cremona, where the singer spent her childhood. When making the album, photos of Mina in a Versace outfit posing against the background of night Cremona were used.

The album received positive reviews from critics, who praised the atmosphere, the successful mixing of styles and genres, the lyrics and of course Mina's vocal abilities. The album also reached the second position in the weekly album chart of Italy and stayed there for 19 weeks. Sales of the album exceeded 500 thousand copies.

In the same year, the album was reissued in a deluxe edition of Natale 1996, which also included the album Napoli.

== Track listing ==
No.	Title	Writer(s)	Length
1.	"Meglio così"	Samuele Cerri; Mauro Santoro; Marino Paire	5:17
2.	"Dottore" (featuring Beppe Grillo)	Carlo Fava; Gianluca Martinelli	5:29
3.	"Succede"	Fabrizio Berlincioni; Mauro Culotta	5:37
4.	"Musica per lui"	Tullio Pizzorno	3:48
5.	"La bacchetta magica"	Maria Enrica Andolfi	4:03
6.	"Ricominciamo"	Bruno Tavernese; Luigi Albertelli	4:05
7.	"Boh!"	Alberto De Martini; Massimiliano Pani	5:17
8.	"Io sarò con te"	Maurizio Morante	5:03
9.	"Volami nel cuore"	Alberto Testa; Manrico Mologni; Gualtiero Malgoni	3:39
10.	"Ma tu ci pensi"	De Martini; Pani	4:21
Total length:			46:46

== Personnel ==
- Mina – vocals
- Sergio Farina – acoustic guitar (1)
- Giorgio Cocilovo – acoustic guitar (1, 4), bouzouki (3), guitar (1, 4), mandolin (3)
- Massimiliano Pani – arrangement (1, 3, 4, 6–8, 10), backing vocals (3, 6, 10), keyboards (1, 3, 4, 7, 8, 10)
- Gabriele Comeglio – arrangement (2, 5), saxophone (2, 5, 10)
- Paolo Gianolio – arrangement (9), guitar (2, 5, 6, 9, 10)
- Emanuela Cortesi – backing vocals (3, 4, 10)
- Simonetta Robbiani – backing vocals (3, 10)
- Stefano De Maco – backing vocals (3, 10)
- Massimo Moriconi – bass
- Maurizio Dei Lazzaretti – drums (1–6, 8, 9)
- Danilo Rea – electric piano (1–6, 8, 10)
- Massimo Varini – guitar (1, 4, 7, 10)
- Umberto Fiorentino – guitar (1, 8, 10)
- Carmine Di – mixing (1, 2, 4–7, 9, 10), sound engineering (1–8, 10)
- Marti Jane Robertson – mixing (3, 8)
- Lorenzo Malacrida – percussion (1, 3, 4, 8, 10)
- Giovanni Di Stefano – trombone (2, 5, 10)
- Mauro Parodi – trombone (2, 5, 10)
- Emilio Soana – trumpet (2, 5, 10)
- Pippo Colucci – trumpet (2, 5, 10)
- Umberto Marcandalli – trumpet (2, 5, 10)
- Gino Sgarbi – hairstyle
- Stefano Anselmo – make-up
- Mauro Balletti – photography, cover art

Credits are adapted from the album's liner notes.

== Charts ==
Chart performance for Cremona
Chart (1996)	Peak position
European Albums (Music & Media)	25
Italian Albums (FIMI)	2
Italian Albums (Musica e dischi)	2
