= Andrea Lo Vecchio =

Italian singer-songwriter and composer (1942–2021)

- Born: 7 October 1942; Milan, Italy
- Died: 17 February 2021 (aged 78); Rome, Italy
- Occupations: Composer; Lyricist; Producer

Andrea Lo Vecchio (7 October 1942 – 17 February 2021) was an Italian composer, lyricist, record producer, singer-songwriter and entrepreneur.

== Life and career ==
Born in Milan, Lo Vecchio started his career in 1962, performing as a singer-songwriter and a guitarist in local music halls and clubs. In 1963 he won a contest for new artists and subsequently got a contract with CBS.

In 1964 Lo Vecchio made his professional debut as a songwriter with the song "Era troppo bello", which was performed by Wilma Goich and won the Festival delle Rose. The same year he founded a cabaret in his hometown, "Le Clochard", where performed notable artists such as Bruno Lauzi, Gufi and Cochi e Renato. In 1966 he sold the cabaret and founded the nightclub "Student's Club"; the same year he started a long and fruitful collaboration as a songwriter with Roberto Vecchioni. In 1967 he participated in the RAI musical show Settevoci, where he launched his song "Ho scelto Bach", with whom he also participated in the Festivalbar.

In 1968 he debuted as a producer for the album Casatschok by Dori Ghezzi and for the self-titled album by Roberto Vecchioni. In 1969 he composed the music for "If I Only Had Time", which was performed by John Rowles and became an international success. The same year he founded a school of water skiing and a nightclub in Sanremo. In the following years Lo Vecchio became a usual collaborator of Mina. Other collaborations include Adriano Celentano, Shirley Bassey, Ornella Vanoni, Gigliola Cinquetti, Patty Pravo, Bruno Lauzi, Loredana Bertè, Mireille Mathieu, Gino Paoli, Al Bano and Romina Power, Raffaella Carrà, Demis Roussos, Claude François, Umberto Bindi, Ivan Graziani, Fausto Leali, Dik Dik, Manuel De Peppe, I Nuovi Angeli. He also wrote several songs for children, notably "Tarzan lo fà", which was performed by Nino Manfredi, as well as musical scores for films, TV-series and commercials.

In 1976 Lo Vecchio founded, together with Detto Mariano and Enzo Scirè, the label "Love Records", which published works of Mario Del Monaco, Bobby Solo and Léo Ferré, among others. In the 1980s he curated the collection "Profili Musicali", published by Ricordi.

Lo Vecchio died of complications from COVID-19 on 17 February 2021, aged 78, during the COVID-19 pandemic in Italy.
