= EMI Italiana =

- Parent company: EMI Records
- Founded: 1931 as VCM; 1967 with the name EMI Italiana in Milan
- Genre: Various
- Country of origin: Italy
- Location: Milan

EMI Italiana is a record label, it was an Italian offshoot of British Electric and Musical Industries, based in Milan. It was founded in 1931 as VCM and, in 1967 it was renamed EMI Italiana followed by EMI Music Italy in 1997 and, finally, EMI Records Italy Srl in 2013, when it was acquired by Universal Music Group.

== History ==
=== VCM's birth ===
Since 1904, La voce del padrone records were published and distributed by SAIF (Società Anonima Italiana di Fonotipia), based in Milan.

The British record company was actually called Grammofono, but due to the famous painting by Francis Barraud "La voce del padrone" which portrays the little dog Nipper listening to a gramophone, used a trademark on the label, it soon took on this unofficial name.

Meanwhile, in 1912, Alfredo Bossi (one of the first Italian record companies) had founded the SNG (Società Nazionale del Grammofono) also based in Milan, which in the 1920s had signed an agreement with the British record label Columbia Graphophone Company for the production and distribution of records in Italy.

Since in 1931 Columbia (not to be confused with the American label of the same name) and His Master's Voice merged giving life to EMI, the same operation took place in Italy also between SAIF and SNG with the involvement of a third partner, Marconiphone, a company specialized in the production of radio sets (the English EMI also intended to expand into this market) which was already distributing the records of the French label Pathé in Italy.

The company name was VCM (Voce del Padrone - Columbia - Marconiphone), and this denomination remained until 1967, when it was translated in EMI Italiana; the headquarters was established in Milan, in via Domenichino 14 (later it was moved to piazza Cavour 2), and the director was Aldo Mario De Luigi.

In the 1930s, Dennis Passadoro (who died in the war in 1942) was director of VCM.

Until the end of the 1950s, he also maintained some offices in Turin, in via Pietro Micca 1.

=== Success ===
Despite being a unique company, however, it maintained the diversity of labels in various publications, unifying the catalog only at the end of 1969.

With the outbreak of the World War II the company, like many others of English property, was placed under seizure, and resumed its activity in Italy in 1946; while giving priority to the distribution of foreign artists in the peninsula, it also dealt with the launch of Italian singers such as Beniamino Gigli, Carlo Buti or Renato Carosone (who recorded for the sub-label Pathé) and, in the 1960s, the Nomadi, Al Bano, Francesco Guccini and Adamo.

In 1972 the main office was moved from Milan to Rome, and then moved in the early 1980s to via Bergamo in Caronno Pertusella (in the province of Varese but a few steps from Milan), while maintaining some branch offices in Rome and Milan.

Over the years it has entered into agreements for the distribution in Italy of brands such as the American Capitol (since 1957), the British Harvest, the German Parlophone (published also in Italy under the name "Parlophon") and the French Odeon (the latter two, until 1967, distributed by Carisch) and many record companies.

Mostly from the post-war period onwards, the directors of the company were British such as the famous Stephen Gottieb who directed EMI Italiana throughout the 1960s; the first Italian was Alexis Rotelli in 1981, followed in 1986 by Roberto Citterio.

In 1997 it changed the company name to EMI Music Italy S.p.A. and in 1999 it moved to Milan, selling the Caronno Pertusella facilities which became IMS dedicated to CD printing. In 2013 became EMI Records Italy Srl, following the acquisition by Universal Music Group.

== Bibliography ==
- Mario de Luigi, L'industria discografica in Italia, published by Lato Side, Rome, 1982
- Mario de Luigi, Storia dell'industria fonografica in Italia, published by Musica e Dischi, Milan, 2008
- Magazine Musica e dischi (Years 1945 – 1968), Il Musichiere (Years 1959 – 1961), TV Sorrisi e Canzoni (Years 1952 – 1968) and others (Ciao amici, Giovani, Big, etc…etc…)
