= Massimo Moriconi (musician) =

Italian musician

Massimo Moriconi (born 20 May 1955 in Rome) is an Italian bassist.

== See also ==
- Glossary of Italian music
- Music history of Italy
- Music of Italy
