= Joe Dassin discography =

- Studio albums: 13
- Extended plays: 7
- Live albums: 7
- Compilation albums: 66
- Singles: 69
- Video albums: 5
- Collaborations: 6
- International Studio Albums: 4
- International Singles: 24
- International Compilation Albums: 7

This is a discography for Joe Dassin.

Joe Dassin, known as the most French of the Americans, was born in New York in 1938 and died in 1980 from a heart attack in Papeete, French Polynesia. He was the son of the American film director Jules Dassin.

Throughout his career, he recorded approximately 250 songs and sold over 50 million albums worldwide.

For a list of Joe Dassin's songs, please refer to this article.

== Studio albums ==
=== Studio albums in French ===
Title	Album details	Peak chart positions		Certifications
Title	Album details	FRA	NOR	Certifications
Joe Dassin à New York	Released: 1966; Label: CBS	—	—	
Les Deux Mondes de Joe Dassin	Released: 1967; Label: CBS	—	—	
Joe Dassin (Les Champs-Élysées)	Released: 1969; Label: CBS	—	—	
Joe Dassin (La Fleur aux dents)	Released: 1970; Label: CBS	1	—	
Joe Dassin (Elle était… Oh!)	Released: 1971; Label: CBS	10	—	
Joe	Released: 1972; Label: CBS	—	—	
13 chansons nouvelles	Released: 1973; Label: CBS	—	—	
Joe Dassin (Si tu t'appelles Mélancolie)	Released: 1974; Label: CBS	—	13	
Joe Dassin (Le Costume blanc)	Released: 1975; Label: CBS	—	—	
Le Jardin du Luxembourg	Released: 1976; Label: CBS	6	20	MC: Platinum; SNEP: 2× Gold
Les Femmes de ma vie	Released: 1978; Label: CBS	—	9	MC: Gold
15 ans déjà...	Released: 1978; Label: CBS	—	—	
Blue Country	Released: 1979; Label: CBS	—	—	
"—" denotes release did not chart or chart information not available.

=== Studio albums in other languages ===
Title	Album details	Notes
Ich Hab' Mich Verliebt	Language: German; Released: 1972; Label: CBS	
En Los Jardines De Mi Ciudad	Language: Spanish; Released: 1976; Label: CBS	Spanish reissue of Le Jardin du Luxembourg
Las Mujeres De Mi Vida	Language: Spanish; Released: 1978; Label: CBS	Spanish reissue of Les Femmes de ma vie
Люксембургский Сад	Language: Russian; Released: 1979; Label: Melodiya	Russian reissue of Le Jardin du Luxembourg
Home Made Ice Cream	Language: English; Released: 1979; Label: CBS	Previously unreleased english versions; Features a new version of Polk Salad Annie

== Live albums ==
Year	Album	Label	Notes
1974	À l'Olympia – Enregistrement public	CBS	Reissued in 1981, CBS; Reissued in 1995, Columbia.
2001	Musicorama	Laser light, Europe 1 et Delta music	Olympia 1968, Olympia 1969, Cambrai 1970, Cambrai 1972; Reissued in 2005 "Les grands concerts", boxset including the 3 Musicorama CD (Delta music).
2003	Concerts Musicorama (II)	Laser light, Europe 1 et Delta music	Musicorama 1970, Musicorama 1972 and two Europe 1 recordings at Studio Périer (1974 & 1975); Reissued in 2005 "Les grands concerts", boxset including 3 Musicorama CD (Delta music).
2004	Concerts Musicorama (III)	Laser light, Europe 1 et Delta music.	Recorded 1977-02-02 at the Olympia; Reissued in 2005 "Les grands concerts", boxset including the 3 Musicorama CD (Delta music).
2005	Joe à l'Olympia	Laser light, Europe 1 et Delta music.	Premiere night recorded on 1974-02-19 at the Olympia, different concert than the album "À l'Olympia" issued in 1974.
2005	Joe Dassin – 25 ans déjà	Sony BMG	Recorded in Sherbrooke, Québec, January 1977; Promo CD sold in a French magazine.
2010	Collector – 5 titres en version inédite	Sony musique	Recorded in Sherbrooke and Montréal, Québec, 1974; CD sold with the "Télé 7 jours" n°2614.

== Select compilation albums ==
Title	Album details	Peak chart positions				Certifications
Title	Album details	FRA	BEL (Fl.)	BEL (Wa.)	SWI	Certifications
Album d'or	Released: 1975; Label: CBS	—	—	—	—	SNEP: 2× Gold
Les 18 plus grands succès de Joe Dassin	Released: 1976; Label: CBS	—	—	—	—	MC: Platinum
20 disques d'or	Released: 1978; Label: CBS	—	—	—	—	MC: Gold
Le meilleur de Joe Dassin	Released: 1995; Label: Sony	—	9	4	—	SNEP: 2× Platinum
Le meilleur	Released: 1998; Label: Olivi	—	—	—	—	MC: Gold
Ses plus grands succès	Released: 2000; Label: Sony	—	—	9	62	SNEP: Platinum
Éternel...	Released: 2005; Label: Sony	43	98	6	58	SNEP: Gold
Les 100 plus belles chansons	Released: 2010; Label: Sony	188	—	19	—	

== Extended plays ==
Title	Album details
Je change un peu de vent	Released: February 1965; Label: CBS
Je vais mon chemin	Released: June 1965; Label: CBS
Bip Bip	Released: November 1965; Label: CBS; Features the first version of the song
Ça m'avance à quoi?	Released: April 1966; Label: CBS
Excuse Me, Lady	Released: November 1966; Label: CBS
Les Dalton	Released: May 1967; Label: CBS

== Singles ==
=== Singles in French ===
Title	B-side	Year	Peak chart positions					Album
Title	B-side	Year	FRA	BEL (Wa.)	GER	NLD	SWI	Album
"La loi" (by Gina Lollobrigida)	"La loi" (by Joe Dassin)	1958	—	—	—	—	—	La Loi (Extraits de la Bande Originale du film de Jules Dassin)
"Bip Bip"	"Guantanamera"	1965	—	39	—	—	—	Bip Bip (EP)
"Ça m'avance à quoi?"	"Comme la lune"	1966	—	17	—	—	—	Joe Dassin à New York
"Guantanamera"	"Katy Cruel"	1966	—	—	—	—	—	Joe Dassin à New York
"Excuse Me, Lady"	"Petite Mama"	1967	—	44	—	—	—	Joe Dassin à New York
"Les Dalton"	"Viens voir le loup"	1967	7	5	—	—	—	Les Deux Mondes de Joe Dassin
"Marie-Jeanne"	"Tout bébé a besoin d'une maman"	1967	—	28	—	—	—	Les Deux Mondes de Joe Dassin
"La bande à Bonnot"	"Plus je vois plus je te veux"	1968	—	35	—	—	—	Joe Dassin (Les Champs-Élysées)
"Siffler sur la colline"	"Comment te dire"	1968	7	2	—	—	—	Joe Dassin (Les Champs-Élysées)
"Le petit pain au chocolat"	"Le temps des œufs au plat"	1968	4	2	—	—	—	Joe Dassin (Les Champs-Élysées)
"Ma bonne étoile"	"Un peu comme toi"	1968	7	4	—	—	—	Joe Dassin (Les Champs-Élysées)
"Mon village du bout du monde"	"La violette africaine"	1969	—	—	—	—	—	Joe Dassin (Les Champs-Élysées)
"Les Champs-Elysées"	"Le chemin de papa"	1969	10	4	31	16	5	Joe Dassin (Les Champs-Élysées)
"C'est la vie, Lily"	"Billy le bordelais"	1970	6	7	—	—	—	Non-album single
"L'Amérique"	"Cecilia"	1970	3	3	—	—	—	Joe Dassin (La Fleur aux dents)
"La Fleur aux dents"	"La Luzerne"	1971	—	3	—	—	—	Joe Dassin (La Fleur aux dents)
"L'Équipe à Jojo"	"Le Portugais"	1971	—	27	—	—	—	Joe Dassin (La Fleur aux dents)
"Fais la bise à ta maman"	"Mais la mer est toujours bleue"	1971	—	16	—	—	—	Non-album single
"Elle était... Oh!"	"La mal-aimée du courrier du cœur"	1972	—	18	—	—	—	Joe Dassin (Elle était… Oh !)
"Taka takata (La femme du toréro)"	"Le cheval de fer"	1972	—	16	50	—	—	Joe
"La Complainte de l'heure de pointe (À vélo dans Paris)"	"Un peu de paradis"	1972	10	8	—	—	—	Joe
"Le Moustique"	"C'est ma tournée"	1973	10	8	—	—	—	Joe
"Salut les amoureux"	"S'aimer sous la pluie"	1973	8	12	—	—	—	Joe
"Je t'aime, je t'aime"	"La Chanson des cigales"	1973	—	26	—	—	—	Non-album single
"Quand on a seize ans"	"À chacun sa chanson"	1974	—	29	—	—	—	13 chansons nouvelles
"Les Plus Belles Années de ma vie"	"Fais-moi de l'électricité"	1974	—	25	—	—	—	13 chansons nouvelles
"C'est du mélo"	"Si tu viens au monde"	1974	—	46	—	—	—	Non-album single
"Vade retro"	"Si tu t'appelles Mélancolie"	1974	9	1	—	—	—	Joe Dassin (Si tu t'appelles Mélancolie)
L'Été indien	"Moi j'ai dit non"	1975	1	1	47	12	5	Joe Dassin (Si tu t'appelles Mélancolie)
"Ça va pas changer le monde"	"Il faut naître à Monaco"	1976	—	2	—	27	15	Joe Dassin (Le Costume blanc)
"Et si tu n'existais pas"	"Salut"	1976	—	3	—	—	—	Joe Dassin (Le Costume blanc)
"Il était une fois nous deux"	"Les Aventuriers" (non-album track)	1976	—	2	—	—	—	Le Jardin du Luxembourg
"À toi"	"Le Café des trois colombes" (non-album track)	1977	1	2	—	—	—	Le Jardin du Luxembourg
"Et l'amour s'en va"	"Le Château de sable"	1977	—	6	—	—	—	Non-album single
"Dans les yeux d'Émilie"	"Maria"	1977	121	—	—	—	—	Les Femmes de ma vie; The album features an edited shortened version of the song Maria featured on the single
"Si tu penses à moi"	"Sorry"	1978	—	—	—	—	—	Non-album single
"La vie se chante, la vie se pleure"	"Un Lord anglais"	1979	—	—	—	—	—	15 ans déjà...
"Côté banjo, côté violon"	"Toi, le refrain de ma vie"	1979	—	—	—	—	—	15 ans déjà...
"Le Dernier Slow"	"Tellement bu, tellement fumé"	1979	—	—	—	—	—	Non-album single
"Faut pas faire de la peine à John"	"Si je dis 'je t'aime'"	1979	—	—	—	—	—	Blue Country

=== Singles in German ===
Title	B-side	Year	Peak chart positions	Notes
Title	B-side	Year	GER	Notes
"Oh, Champs-Élysées"	"Es Ist Leicht"	1969	—	German version of "Les Champs-Elysées"
"Das Sind Zwei Linke Schuh"	"Meines Vaters Sohn"	1970	21	German single
"Es Gibt Mädchen So Zum Träumen"	"Melanie"	1971	—	German version of "La Fleur aux dents"
"In Versailles In Dem Großen Garten"	"Darauf Ein Glas"	1972	—	German singles
"Ich Hab' Mich Verliebt"	"Dieser Sänger Braucht Nur Ein Chanson"	1972	—	German singles
"In Paris Ringsumher" (with Schöneberger Sängerknaben)	"Schöne Grüsse An Mama"	1973	—	German singles
"Keiner Singt Gern Allein"	"Wahre Liebe Ist Ganz Leise"	1974	—	German singles
"Septemberwind"	"Ce n'est rien que du vent"	1975	28	German version of "L'Été indien"

=== Singles in other languages ===
Title	B-side	Year	Notes
"La banda Bonnot"	"Un giorno d'aprile"	1968	Italian version of "La bande à Bonnot"
"シャンゼリゼー"	"ル・シュマン・ド・パパ"	1969	Japanese version of "Les Champs-Elysées"
"The Champs-Elysées"	"Sunday Times"	1969	English version of "Les Champs-Elysées"
"Vaya na cumina"	"We ain't makin' it"	1973	English version of "Vaya-na-cumana"
"Indian Summer (Africa)"	"Sunday Times"	1975	English version of "L'Été indien"
"Aún vivo para el amor (África)"	"Ce n'est rien que du vent"	1975	Spanish version of "L'Été indien"; There is a single and an album version of Aún vivo para el amor (aka Solo puedo mirar atras)
"Y si tu no has de volver"	"Et si tu n'existais pas"	1976	Spanish version of "Et si tu n'existais pas" (released in Argentina and Chile)
"Y si no existieras"	"Esto no va a cambiar el mundo"	1977	Spanish version of "Et si tu n'existais pas" (released in Spain)
"A ti"	"À toi"	1978	Spanish version of "À toi"
"El amor se va"	"Et l'amour s'en va"	1978	Spanish version of "Et l'amour s'en va"

== Collaborations and other appearances ==
Year	Album	Collaborator	Notes
1974	Une journée de Monsieur Chose	Carlos	Contains "Crésus et Roméo" by Carlos and Joe Dassin (CBS).
1982	Little Italy	Marcella Bella	Recorded in 1978, issued posthumously in 1982; Reissued in 1989, Sélection du Reader's Digest (LP and CD).
2001	Les insolences d'un téléphone - Vol. 1	Yvan Ducharme	Prank call of Joe Dassin, done by Yvan Ducharme (end of the sixties).
2010	Dassin Symphonique	Zoltán Kovács	Virtual collaborations with the voice of Joe Dassin and the Budapest Symphonic Orchestra directed by Zoltán Kovács.
2013	Hélène Ségara en duo avec Joe Dassin – Et si tu n'existais pas	Hélène Ségara	Virtual duets with Hélène Ségara.
2015	Joe Dassin Chante avec les Chœurs de l'Armée Rouge	Alexandrov Ensemble	Virtual duets with the Alexandrov Ensemble.

== Video albums ==
=== Video ===
- 1989 Ses plus grands succès
- 1998 Le dernier slow
- 2000 De l'Amérique aux Champs-Élysées

=== DVD ===
- 2000 Ses plus grands succès
- 2005 À toi... (Live at the Olympia 1977, different than the version on Musicorama III)
