= Ses plus grands succès (Joe Dassin album) =

Studio album by Joe Dassin
- Released: 2000
- Genre: chanson
- Label: Versailles (Sony Music)

Ses plus grands succès is a 2000 greatest hits album by Joe Dassin.

== Track listing ==
CD 1
No.	Title	Length
1.	"Les Champs-Élysées"	2:39
2.	"Le Petit Pain au chocolat"	3:29
3.	"Guantanamera"	2:54
4.	"Salut les amoureux"	4:03
5.	"L'équipe à Jojo"	3:10
6.	"Et si tu n'existais pas"	3:30
7.	"La fleur aux dents"	2:11
8.	"Les Dalton"	2:39
9.	"La complainte de l'heure de pointe (À vélo dans Paris)"	1:52
10.	"Marie-Jeanne"	4:16
11.	"Le chemin de papa"	2:29
12.	"L'Amérique"	2:26
13.	"Siffler sur la colline"	2:37
14.	"La demoiselle de déshonneur"	2:47
15.	"Le moustique"	2:19
16.	"Il était une fois nous deux"	3:57
17.	"Ma bonne étoile"	2:38
18.	"Le grand parking"	2:15
19.	"Les plus belles années de ma vie"	4:38
20.	"Comme la lune"	3:38
21.	"Un lord anglais"	2:55
22.	"Vade retro"	3:02
23.	"Billy le bordelais"	4:07

CD 2
No.	Title	Length
1.	"L'été indien"	4:31
2.	"À toi"	2:51
3.	"Cécilia"	4:00
4.	"La bande à Bonnot"	2:52
5.	"Dans les yeux d'Émilie"	3:45
6.	"Il faut naître à Monaco"	1:52
7.	"C'est la vie Lily"	3:00
8.	"Ça va pas changer le monde"	3:04
9.	"Tellement bu, tellement fumé"	2:56
10.	"Un cadeau de papa"	2:20
11.	"Le temps des œufs au plat"	2:53
12.	"Ça m'avance à quoi?"	2:36
13.	"The Guitar Don't Lie"	4:17
14.	"Si tu t'appelles mélancolie"	3:17
15.	"Taka takata (La femme du Toréro)"	2:37
16.	"Excuse Me, Lady"	2:29
17.	"Mon village du bout du monde"	3:21
18.	"Je change un peu de vent"	2:20
19.	"Le café des 3 colombes"	3:59
20.	"Mé qué mé qué"	2:37
21.	"Le dernier slow"	3:33
22.	"Salut"	3:19
23.	"Taka takata (La femme du Toréro)" (Remix Latino)	3:26

== Charts ==
Chart (2000)	Peak position
Belgian Albums (Ultratop Wallonia)	9
Swiss Albums (Schweizer Hitparade)	62
