= Le Meilleur de Joe Dassin =

Le meilleur de Joe Dassin

Studio album by Joe Dassin
- Released: 1995
- Genre: chanson
- Label: Columbia (Sony Music)

Le meilleur de Joe Dassin is a 1995 "greatest hits" album by Joe Dassin.

== Track listing ==
=== 2×CD version ===
Cat. nr. Columbia COL 480787 2 (Sony Music)

CD 1
No.	Title	Length
1.	"Bip-bip"	2:15
2.	"L'Amérique"	2:18
3.	"L'été indien"	4:32
4.	"À toi"	2:51
5.	"Excuse Me, Lady"	2:29
6.	"La vie se chante, la vie se pleure"	4:20
7.	"La complainte de l'heure de pointe (À vélo dans Paris)"	1:45
8.	"Le moustique"	2:20
9.	"Salut les amoureux"	4:03
10.	"Siffler sur la colline"	2:39
11.	"Vade retro"	3:01
12.	"Cécilia"	4:00
13.	"Marie-Jeanne"	4:12
14.	"Le café des 3 colombes"	3:55
15.	"Il faut naître à Monaco"	1:53
16.	"Ça va pas changer le monde"	3:04
17.	"Il était une fois nous deux"	3:54
18.	"La fleur aux dents"	2:09

CD 2
No.	Title	Length
1.	"Les Champs-Élysées"	2:39
2.	"Les Dalton"	2:40
3.	"L'équipe à Jojo"	3:11
4.	"Et si tu n'existais pas"	3:27
5.	"La demoiselle de déshonneur"	2:49
6.	"Le petit pain au chocolat"	3:23
7.	"Le dernier slow"	3:32
8.	"Guantanamera"	2:52
9.	"Billy le bordelais"	4:07
10.	"C'est la vie Lily"	3:01
11.	"Ma bonne étoile"	2:39
12.	"Comment te dire"	3:03
13.	"Dans les yeux d'Émilie"	3:44
14.	"Un cadeau de papa"	2:21
15.	"Le chemin de papa"	2:29
16.	"La bande à Bonnot"	2:51
17.	"Si tu t'appelles mélancolie"	3:16
18.	"The Guitar Don't Lie"	4:16

=== 1×CD version ===
Cat. nr.: Columbia 481116 2 (Sony Music)

No.	Title	Length
1.	"Bip-bip"	2:14
2.	"Guantanamera"	2:51
3.	"Les Dalton"	2:38
4.	"Les Champs-Élysées"	2:38
5.	"Le Chemin de papa"	2:27
6.	"Le Petit Pain au chocolat"	3:21
7.	"Siffler sur la colline"	2:38
8.	"L'Équipe à Jojo"	3:09
9.	"La Fleur aux dents"	2:10
10.	"L'Amérique"	2:16
11.	"The Guitar Don't Lie"	4:16
12.	"Cécilia"	3:59
13.	"Salut les amoureux"	4:02
14.	"Si tu t'appelles Mélancolie"	3:14
15.	"Et si tu n'existais pas"	3:25
16.	"L'Été indien"	4:30
17.	"Ça va pas changer le monde"	3:03
18.	"Le café des 3 colombes"	3:54
19.	"À toi"	2:49
20.	"Le dernier slow"	3:30

== Charts ==
Chart (1995)	Peak position
Belgian Albums (Ultratop Flanders)	9
Belgian Albums (Ultratop Wallonia)	4
