= Salut Joe! Hommage à Joe Dassin =

Compilation album by Various artists
- Released: 2006
- Label: Disques Atlantis

Salut Joe! Hommage à Joe Dassin is an album containing 13 reinterpretations of Joe Dassin's most famous songs. It was released on February 7, 2006. Its total length is 00:45:52.

== Songs ==
1. "Le moustique (2:21) – Stefie Shock
2. "Siffler sur la colline" (3:07) – Les Respectables
3. "Dans les yeux d'Émilie" (4:10) – Pierre Lapointe
4. "Dans la brume du matin"" (3:52) – Patrick Norman
5. "Salut les amoureux" (4:03) – Guy A. Lepage & Marc Labrèche
6. "Le petit pain au chocolat" (3:21) – Sébastien Lacombe
7. "Il était une fois nous deux" (4:10) – Mélanie Renaud
8. "Et si tu n'existais pas" (4:24) – DobaCaracol
9. "À toi" (3:37) – Éric Lapointe
10. "Bip-Bip" (2:30) – Les Breastfeeders
11. "Les Champs Élysées" (2:26) – Mario Pelchat
12. "L'Amérique" (2:41) – Raphaël Torr
13. "L'été indien" (5:09) – Mara Tremblay & Stefie Shock
