= You'll See (disambiguation) =

"You'll See" is a song by Madonna

== Music ==
- You'll See, album by DJ Green Lantern
- "Crois-moi ça durera", a 1962 song by Gilbert Bécaud, English version "You'll See" from Monsieur Gilbert Bécaud, covered in 1965 as "You'll See" by Nat King Cole, written by Norman Gimbel, released on The Beautiful Ballads
- "You'll See', a 1978 song by Wendy Waldman, B-side of "Long Hot Summer Nights"
- "You'll See", a song by The Notorious B.I.G. from Special Dedication (The Notorious B.I.G. discography)
- "You'll See", a 1981 song by Jimmy Smith (musician) from All The Way Live
- "You'll See", a 2013 song by The Feeling from Boy Cried Wolf (The Feeling album)
- "You'll See a Man", song by Harvest (band)

== See also ==
- You'll Never See album by Swedish band Grave
