= Le Jardin du Luxembourg (song) =

Single by Joe Dassin

from the album Le Jardin du Luxembourg
- Released: 1976
- Genre: Chanson, pop
- Length: 12:00
- Label: CBS Disques
- Songwriters: Salvatore Cutugno, Vito Pallavicini; Claude Lemesle (French lyrics)
- Producer: Jacques Plait

Joe Dassin singles chronology
"Il était une fois nous deux" (1976)	"Le Jardin du Luxembourg" (1976)	"À toi" (1977)

Le Jardin du Luxembourg is a song by Joe Dassin. It was the first track of side 1 of his 1976 album Le Jardin du Luxembourg. The female vocals are by Dominique Poulain.

== Writing and versions ==
The song was written by Vito Pallavicini and Toto Cutugno. The French lyrics were written by Claude Lemesle.

The song was later covered by Dassin himself in Spanish under the title "En los jardines de mi ciudad".

The original Italian version (by Vito Pallavicini and Toto Cutugno), titled "Quindici minuti di un uomo", was recorded by Albatros (a band founded by Toto Cutugno).

== Release ==
The song was released as a two-part promo single.

== Composition and reception ==
According to the producer Jacques Plait, it is a "song / symphony / one-man musical", its main theme is "One more day without love".

The song lasts almost a quarter of an hour. "The most amazing thing," Dassin recounted, "is that with this song I found myself at the top of the charts at Canadian radio."

== Track listing ==
7" promo single CBS 4858 (1976)

A. "Le Jardin du Luxembourg" (1ėre Partie) (6:37)
B. "Le Jardin du Luxembourg" (2e Partie) (5:23)

== Other covers ==
- 2013: Hélène Ségara (virtual duet with Dassin) on the album Et si tu n'existais pas
