= Ses Plus Grands Succès =

Ses plus grands succès (French for "His/her greatest hits") and Ses grands succès ("His/her great hits") are popular titles for greatest-hits albums by Francophone artists.

== Ses plus grands succès ==
- Ses plus grands succès (Desireless album)
- Ses plus grands succès (Joe Dassin album)
- À planche... Ses plus grands succès, a 1976 greatest-hits album by Claude Dubois

== Ses grands succès ==
- Ses grands succès (France Gall album), a 1973 compilation album by France Gall
- Ses grands succès (William Sheller album), a 1981 greatest-hits album by William Sheller
