= Taka Takata =

Taka Takata may refer to:

- Taka Takata, a comic strip by Vicq which ran in the Franco-Belgian comics magazine Tintin from 1965 to 1980
- Taka takata, a Spanish pop song by Paco Paco released in 1972 and re-recorded in French by Joe Dassin
