= Joe Dassin (Les Champs-Élysées) =

Studio album by Joe Dassin
- Released: August 20, 1969
- Recorded: February 1968 – March 1969
- Genre: Chanson
- Label: CBS Disques
- Producer: Jacques Plait

Joe Dassin chronology
Les Deux Mondes de Joe Dassin (1967)	Joe Dassin (Les Champs-Élysées) (1969)	Joe Dassin (La Fleur aux dents) (1970)

Singles from Joe Dassin (Les Champs-Élysées)
- 1. "Siffler sur la colline" / "Comment te dire" Released: 1968; 2. "Ma bonne étoile" Released: 1968; 3. "Le Petit Pain au chocolat" Released: 1968; 4. "Me que me que" Released: 1969; 5. ""Les Champs-Élysées / "Le Chemin de papa"" Released: 1969; 6. "Mon village du bout du monde" Released: 1969

Joe Dassin (commonly called Les Champs-Élysées after its most famous track) is the third studio album by American musician Joe Dassin. It was originally released in 1969 on the CBS Disques label.

== Commercial performance ==
The album reached at least the top 10 in France (according to the chart that U.S. Billboard published in its "Hits of the World" section).

== Track listing ==
Side 1
No.	Title	Writer(s)	Length
1.	"Le Chemin de papa"	Pierre Delanoë – Joe Dassin
2.	"Le Petit Pain au chocolat"	Pierre Delanoë – Riccardo Del Turco – Giancarlo Bigazzi
3.	"Les Champs-Élysées"	Pierre Delanoë – Mike Wilsh – Mike Deighan
4.	"Siffler sur la colline"	Daniele Pace – Mario Panzeri – Lorenzo Pilat – Jean-Michel Rivat – Frank Thomas
5.	"Mon village du bout du monde"	Traditionnel – Joe Dassin – Pierre Delanoë
6.	"Me que - me que"	Charles Aznavour – Gilbert Bécaud

Side 2
No.	Title	Writer(s)	Length
1.	"Ma bonne étoile"	Pierre Delanoë – Daniele Pace – Mario Panzeri – Lorenzo Pilat
2.	"Un peu comme toi"	Johnny Nash – Richelle Dassin
3.	"La Bande à Bonnot"	Joe Dassin – Francis Baxter – Camille Sauvage – Christian Jollet – Jean-Michel Rivat – Frank Thomas – Guy Favereau
4.	"La Violette africaine"	Richelle Dassin – Joe Dassin
5.	"Le Temps des œufs au plat"	Richelle Dassin – Claude Lemesle – Joe Dassin
6.	"Sunday Times"	Richelle Dassin – Joe Dassin

== Notes ==
The song Mon village du bout du monde is a French cover of a traditional Irish song Carrickfergus.
