= List of number-one hits of 1968 (Italy) =

This is a list of the number-one hits of 1968 on Italian Hit Parade Singles Chart.

Issue date	Song	Artist
January 6	"L'ora dell'amore"	I Camaleonti
January 13	"L'ora dell'amore"	I Camaleonti
January 20	"L'ora dell'amore"	I Camaleonti
January 27	"L'ora dell'amore"	I Camaleonti
February 3	"L'ora dell'amore"	I Camaleonti
February 10	"L'ora dell'amore"	I Camaleonti
February 17	"L'ora dell'amore"	I Camaleonti
February 24	"Canzone"	Don Backy
March 2	"La tramontana"	Antoine
March 9	"Canzone"	Don Backy
March 16	"La tramontana"	Antoine
March 23	"La tramontana"	Antoine
March 30	"La tramontana"	Antoine
April 6	"La tramontana"	Antoine
April 13	"Gimme Little Sign"	Brenton Wood
April 20	"The Ballad of Bonnie and Clyde"	Georgie Fame
April 27	"Gimme Little Sign"	Brenton Wood
May 4	"La bambola"	Patty Pravo
May 11	"La bambola"	Patty Pravo
May 18	"La bambola"	Patty Pravo
May 25	"La bambola"	Patty Pravo
June 1	"La bambola"	Patty Pravo
June 8	"La bambola"	Patty Pravo
June 15	"La bambola"	Patty Pravo
June 22	"La bambola"	Patty Pravo
June 29	"La bambola"	Patty Pravo
July 6	"Luglio"	Riccardo Del Turco
July 13	"Luglio"	Riccardo Del Turco
July 20	"Ho scritto t'amo sulla sabbia"	Franco IV e Franco I
July 27	"Ho scritto t'amo sulla sabbia"	Franco IV e Franco I
August 3	"La nostra favola"	Jimmy Fontana
August 10	"La nostra favola"	Jimmy Fontana
August 17	"La nostra favola"	Jimmy Fontana
August 24	"La nostra favola"	Jimmy Fontana
August 31	"La nostra favola"	Jimmy Fontana
September 7	"Azzurro"	Adriano Celentano
September 14	"Azzurro"	Adriano Celentano
September 21	"Azzurro"	Adriano Celentano
September 28	"Azzurro"	Adriano Celentano
October 5	"Simon Says"	1910 Fruitgum Company
October 12	"Simon Says"	1910 Fruitgum Company
October 19	"Simon Says"	1910 Fruitgum Company
October 26	"Simon Says"	1910 Fruitgum Company
November 2	"Applausi"	I Camaleonti
November 9	"Applausi"	I Camaleonti
November 16	"Applausi"	I Camaleonti
November 23	"Applausi"	I Camaleonti
November 30	"Applausi"	I Camaleonti
December 7	"Applausi"	I Camaleonti
December 14	"Applausi"	I Camaleonti
December 21	"Zum zum zum"	Sylvie Vartan
December 28	"Zum zum zum"	Sylvie Vartan

== See also ==
- 1968 in music
- List of number-one hits in Italy
