= Jason Crest =

English psychedelic pop group

Jason Crest (formerly the Good Thing Brigade) were an English psychedelic pop group, active from around 1967 to 1969. Despite releasing five singles on Philips between 1967 and 1968 (including a cover version of the Move's "(Here We Go Round) the Lemon Tree"), the band never achieved commercial success and disbanded towards the end of the 1960s when their recording contract with Philips expired.

However, the singles "Black Mass", "Turquoise Tandem Cycle", "(Here We Go Round) The Lemon Tree" and "Place in the Sun" have since appeared on the Rubble collections of British psychedelia and freakbeat, and the band garnered a modest cult following.

Jason Crest's fourth single, "Waterloo Road" (1968), was adapted into French as "Les Champs-Élysées" by singer Joe Dassin and reached number one in France.

== Band members ==
- Terry Clarke (lead vocals)
- Terry Dobson (Hammond organ, vocals)
- Derek Smallcombe (lead guitar, vocals)
- Ron Fowler (bass, vocals) (replaced by John Selley after third single)
- Roger Siggery (drums) (born Roger William Siggery, 31 January 1945, East Grinstead, Kent)

== Discography ==
=== Singles ===
- "Turquoise Tandem Cycle" / "Good Life" (Philips BF 1633)
- "Juliano the Bull" / "Two by the Sea" (Philips BF 1650)
- "(Here We Go Round) The Lemon Tree" (Roy Wood) / "Patricia's Dream" (Philips BF 1687)
- "Waterloo Road" / "Education" (Philips BF 1752)
- "Place in the Sun" / "Black Mass" (Philips BF 1809)

=== Compilation albums ===
- The Collected Works of Jason Crest (Wooden Hill WHCD006) – CD only
- Radio Sessions (Tenth Planet TP 041) – Vinyl only
