= 13 chansons nouvelles =

Studio album by Joe Dassin
- Released: March 8, 1973
- Genre: chanson
- Label: CBS Disques
- Producer: Jacques Plait

Joe Dassin chronology
Joe (1972)	13 chansons nouvelles (1973)	Joe Dassin (Si tu t'appelles Mélancolie) (1974)

Singles from 13 chansons nouvelles
- 1. "Quand on a seize ans" Released: 1973; 2. "Quand on a du feu" Released: 1973; 3. "Fais-moi de l'électricité" Released: 1974

13 chansons nouvelles is the seventh French studio album by Joe Dassin. It came out in 1973 on CBS Disques.

== Track listing ==
Side 1
No.	Title	Writer(s)	Length
1.	"À chacun sa chanson" (I Shall Sing)	Van Morrison	3:10
2.	"On s'en va"	Pierre Delanoë, Claude Lemesle, Joe Dassin	2:47
3.	"Dédé le kid"	Pierre Delanoë, Claude Lemesle, Daniel Vangarde	2:37
4.	"Pourquoi pas moi" (I Got a Name)	[Charles Fox, Norman Gimbel]	3:45
5.	"Allons danser Valérie"	Jack Downing	2:45
6.	"Les Plus Belles Années de ma vie" ("Rock 'N' Roll (I Gave You the Best Years of My Life)")	Kevin Johnson	4:35

Side 2
No.	Title	Writer(s)	Length
1.	"La Dernière Page"	Gil Slavin	2:20
2.	"Qu'est-ce que j'ai pu faire hier soir ?"	Pierre Delanoë, Claude Lemesle, Joe Dassin	2:25
3.	"Quand on a seize ans"	Pierre Delanoë, Claude Lemesle, Joe Dassin	2:30
4.	"Oh la la !"	Pierre Delanoë, Claude Lemesle, Joe Dassin	3:00
5.	"Ton côté du lit"	Alice Dona, Claude Lemesle	3:18
6.	"Quand on a du feu"	Pierre Delanoë, Claude Lemesle, Joe Dassin	2:40
7.	"Fais-moi de l'électricité"	Gil Slavin	2:25
