= Crois-moi ça durera =

"Crois-moi ça durera" is a 1962 hit song by Gilbert Bécaud, with lyrics by Pierre Delanoë. The lyrics begin "Crois-moi crois-moi ça durera, On s'aimera on s'aimera très fort."

The French original was covered by Isabelle Aubret, by Les 3 Ménestrels, by Les 6 de Paris (all 1962) and by Paul Piot et son Orchestre (1963). The French pianist Jean-Michel Damase arranged the song into a 22-minute piece for orchestra in 1968. Later covers included Nana Mouskouri.

== English version "You'll See" ==
New English lyrics were written by Norman Gimbel. The song was covered as "You'll See", in 1965 by Nat King Cole as the B-side of "Wanderlust". Nat King Cole also recorded the French original for Capitol France in 1965 for the 4-song EP Nat King Cole Chante En Français. The EP also contained "Je Ne Repartirai Pas (Love)" by Bert Kaempfert, Milt Gabler, and Jean Delleme Rate, "Les Feuilles Mortes" by Joseph Kosma and Jacques Prévert and "Le Bonheur, C'est Quand On S'aime" by Georges Coulonges and Claude Henri Vic. In 1967 Nat King Cole's English B-side was released by Capitol Records on the posthumous collection The Beautiful Ballads. Bécaud himself recorded the English version "You'll See" on Monsieur Gilbert Bécaud.
