= Si tu t'appelles Mélancolie =

Single by Joe Dassin

from the album Joe Dassin (Si tu t'appelles Mélancolie)
- A-side: "Si tu t'appelles Mélancolie"
- B-side: "Vade retro"
- Released: 1974
- Genre: Chanson, pop
- Length: 3:17
- Label: CBS Disques
- Songwriter(s): Lyrics: Pierre Delanoë, Claude Lemesle
- Producer(s): Jacques Plait

Joe Dassin singles chronology
"C'est du mélo" (1974)	"Si tu t'appelles Mélancolie" / "Vade retro" (1974)	"L'été indien (Africa)" (1975)

"Si tu t'appelles Mélancolie" ("If Your Name Is Melancholia") is a song by Joe Dassin from his 1974 album Joe Dassin (Si tu t'appelles Mélancolie).

The song was based on the song "Please Tell Her (I Said Hello)", originally released by Shepstone & Dibbens; Dana's cover version became a UK and Irish hit single in 1975/76. It was adapted into French by Pierre Delanoë and Claude Lemesle.

It was released as a single in 1974, with "Vade retro" on the other side.

== Track listing ==
7" single (CBS S 2891, 1975, Germany etc.)

1. "Si tu t'appelles Mélancolie" (3:17)
2. "Vade retro" (2:55)

== Charts ==
Chart (1975)	Peak position
Belgium (Ultratop 50 Flanders)	8
France (SNEP)	4
