= 15 ans déjà... =

Studio album by Joe Dassin
- Released: 1978
- Genre: chanson
- Label: CBS Disques
- Producer: Jacques Plait

Joe Dassin chronology
Les Femmes de ma vie (1978)	15 ans déjà... (1978)	Blue Country (1979)

Singles from 15 ans déjà...
- 1. "La vie se chante, la vie se pleure" Released: 1978; 2. "Côté banjo, côté violon" Released: 1979

15 ans déjà... is the 12th French studio album by Joe Dassin. It came out in 1978 on CBS Disques.

== Track listing ==
Side 1
No.	Title	Writer(s)	Length
1.	"Un lord anglais"	Pierre Delanoë, Claude Lemesle, Joe Dassin, William Sheller	2:50
2.	"Toi, le refrain de ma vie" ("Tell Me to My Face")	Allan Clarke, Tony Hicks, Graham Nash	5:20
3.	"La Beauté du diable" ("A Mellow Melody")	Charlie Rich, Billy Sherrill	2:24
4.	"Happy Birthday" ("Balletto")	Pierre Delanoë, Claude Lemesle, Joe Dassin, Vito Pallavicini, Gianni Guarnieri, Michelle Vasseur	4:48
5.	"La Fan"	Alice Dona, Claude Lemesle, Joe Dassin	2:43

Side 2
No.	Title	Writer(s)	Length
1.	"La vie se chante, la vie se pleure" ("Down by the Water")	Jörg Evers, Jürgen Korduletsch, Keith Forsey, Mats Björklund	4:17
2.	"Darlin'" (En anglais)	Stewart Blandamer	3:13
3.	"Pour le plaisir de partir"	Pierre Delanoë, Claude Lemesle, Joe Dassin, Didier Barbelivien	2:50
4.	"Côté banjo, côté violon"	Pierre Delanoë, Claude Lemesle, Toto Cutugno, Joe Dassin	3:07
5.	"Qu'est-ce que tu fais de moi ?"	Pierre Delanoë, Claude Lemesle, Toto Cutugno	3:25
