= Et l'amour s'en va =

Single by Joe Dassin
- Released: 1977
- Genre: Chanson, pop
- Length: 3:40
- Label: CBS Disques
- Songwriter(s): Vito Pallavicini, Claude Lemesle, Salvatore Cutugno, Michele Vasseur
- Producer(s): Jacques Plait

Joe Dassin singles chronology
"À toi" (1977)	"Et l'amour s'en va" (1977)	"Dans les yeux d'Émilie" (1977)

"Et l'amour s'en va" is a song by Joe Dassin. It was released in 1977 as a single on CBS, with "Le château de sable" on the other side.

The song is credited to Vito Pallavicini, Claude Lemesle, Salvatore Cutugno and Michele Vasseur.

"Et l'amour s'en va" reached no. 29 in Flanders (Dutch Belgium).

== Track listing ==
7" single (CBS 5291)

1. "Et l'amour s'en va" (3:40)
2. "Le château de sable" (3:12)

== Charts ==
Classement (1977)	Peak position
Belgium (Ultratop 50 Flanders)	29
