= Le Jardin du Luxembourg =

Studio album by Joe Dassin
- Released: August 20, 1976
- Labels: CBS Disques; Columbia
- Producer: Jacques Plait

Joe Dassin chronology
| Joe Dassin (Le Costume blanc) (1975) | Le Jardin du Luxembourg (1976) | Les Femmes de ma vie (1978) |

Singles from Le Jardin du Luxembourg
- 1. "Il était une fois nous deux" Released: 1976; 2. "Le Jardin du Luxembourg (Part 1)" / "Le Jardin du Luxembourg (Part 2)" Released: 1976; 3. "À toi" Released: 1976

Professional ratings
Review scores
| Source | Rating |
|---|---|
| AllMusic | 4.5/5 stars |

Le Jardin du Luxembourg (French pronunciation: [lə ʒaʁdɛ̃ dy lyksɑ̃buʁ]) is the 10th studio album by American singer Joe Dassin. It came out in 1976 on CBS Disques.

== Commercial performance ==
The album reached at least the top 6 in France and at least the top 8 in Greece (according to the charts, courtesy respectively of the Centre d'Information et de Documentation du Disque and of Lefty Kongalides, that U.S. Billboard published in its "Hits of the World" section).

At a big gala in Wavre, Belgium, in late 1977 Joe Dassin received gold disks for this album and for one of his several albums titled Joe Dassin.

Also, U.S. Billboard wrote in its 24 December 1977 issue that according to CBS Le Jardin du Luxembourg and another Joe Dassin album, titled Joe Dassin, were among the company's best selling albums over the past month.

On April 19, 1995, the album was certified Double Gold by the French Syndicat National de l'Édition Phonographique.

== Track listing ==
Side 1
| No. | Title | Writer(s) | Length |
|---|---|---|---|
| 1. | "Le Jardin du Luxembourg" ("Quindici minuti di un uomo") | Toto Cutugno, Vito Pallavicini | 12:00 |
| 2. | "Il était une fois nous deux" ("Monja Monja") | Toto Cutugno, Vito Pallavicini | 3:55 |

Side 2
| No. | Title | Writer(s) | Length |
|---|---|---|---|
| 1. | "À toi" | Jean Baudlot, Joe Dassin, Pierre Delanoë, Claude Lemesle | 2:50 |
| 2. | "Le Café des trois colombes" ("In het kleine cafe aan de haven") | Pierre Kartner | 4:01 |
| 3. | "Comme disait Valentine" | Johnny Arthey, Joe Dassin, Pierre Delanoë, Claude Lemesle | 3:06 |
| 4. | "Laisse-moi dormir" ("Sleep All Mornin'") | Alex Harvey | 2:50 |
| 5. | "Que sont devenues mes amours ?" | Joe Dassin, Pierre Delanoë, Claude Lemesle | 3:41 |

== Charts ==
=== Monthly charts ===
Monthly chart performance for Le Jardin du Luxembourg
| Chart (1980) | Peak position |
|---|---|
| Soviet Albums (Moskovskij Komsomolets) | 2 |

=== Year-end charts ===
Year-end chart performance for Le Jardin du Luxembourg
| Chart (1980) | Peak position |
|---|---|
| Soviet Albums (Moskovskij Komsomolets) | 4 |
