= Les Femmes de ma vie =

Studio album by Joe Dassin
- Released: August 20, 1978
- Genre: chanson
- Label: CBS Disques
- Producer: Jacques Plait

Joe Dassin chronology
Le Jardin du Luxembourg (1976)	Les Femmes de ma vie (1978)	15 ans déjà... (1978)

Singles from Les Femmes de ma vie
- 1. "Dans les yeux d'Émilie" Released: 1977; 2. "Maria" Released: 1977

Les Femmes de ma vie is the 11th French studio album by Joe Dassin. It came out in 1978 on CBS Disques.

== Track listing ==
Side 1
No.	Title	Writer(s)	Length
1.	"La femme idéale (Angelina)" ("Amelia")	Joe Dassin, Gianni Mocchetti	3:15
2.	"La première femme de ma vie"	Pierre Delanoë, Alain Goraguer, Claude Lemesle	2:20
3.	"Noisette et Cassidy"	Pierre Delanoë, Claude Lemesle, Gilles Marchal	2:50
4.	"La demoiselle de déshonneur"	Claude Lemesle	2:46
5.	"Dans les yeux d'Émilie"	Pierre Delanoë, Claude Lemesle, Yvon Ouazana, Vivien Vallay	3:40
6.	"Quand on sera deux" ("'A canzuncella")	Paolo Morelli	3:03

Side 2
No.	Title	Writer(s)	Length
1.	"Maria"	Manipoli, Pino Massara, Gianni Mocchetti	4:00
2.	"Mon copain Julie" ("Southern Nights")	Allen Toussaint	3:02
3.	"Marie-Ange" ("Fallen Angel")	Guy Fletcher, Doug Flett	3:21
4.	"J'ai craqué"	Alain Goraguer, Claude Lemesle	2:27
5.	"Petit ballon"	Joe Dassin, Pierre Delanoë, Alain Goraguer, Claude Lemesle	3:02
6.	"La rue Marie-Laurence"	Guy Bulanger, Pierre Delanoë, Claude Lemesle	3:02
