= Non illuderti mai =

1968 single by Orietta Berti

Single by Orietta Berti

from the album Dolcemente
- B-side: "Amore per la vita"
- Released: 8 April 1968
- Genre: Pop
- Length: 2:27
- Label: Polydor
- Songwriters: Daniele Pace; Mario Panzeri; Lorenzo Pilat

Orietta Berti singles chronology
"Tu che non sorridi mai" (1968)	"Non illuderti mai" (1968)	"Se m'innamoro di un ragazzo come te" (1968)

"Non illuderti mai" ("Never Deceive Yourself") is a song by Italian singer Orietta Berti, released as a single in April 1968 for the summer festival Un disco per l'estate. The song came in second place at the festival behind "Luglio" by Riccardo Del Turco. It has notably been covered in English as "My Little Lady" by the Tremeloes and in French as "Ma Bonne Étoile" by Joe Dassin.

== Track listing ==
7"

1. "Non illuderti mai" – 2:27
2. "Amore per la vita" – 2:43

== Charts and certifications ==
=== Weekly charts ===
Chart (1968)	Peak position
Italy (Musica e dischi)	3

=== Certifications ===
Region	Certification	Certified units/sales
Italy (FIMI)	Silver	250,000

== The Tremeloes version ==
"My Little Lady"
- Cover of the single released in the Netherlands

Single by the Tremeloes

from the album My Little Lady
- B-side: "All the World to Me"
- Released: 6 September 1968
- Genre: Pop rock
- Length: 2:36
- Label: CBS
- Songwriters: Daniele Pace; Mario Panzeri; Lorenzo Pilat; Alan Blakely; Len Hawkes
- Producer: Mike Smith

The Tremeloes singles chronology
"Helule Helule" (1968)	"My Little Lady" (1968)	"I Shall Be Released" (1968)

British band the Tremeloes released an English-language version of the song in September 1968, with lyrics by band members Alan Blakely and Len "Chip" Hawkes. It became a top-ten hit in the UK.

=== Reception ===
Reviewing for Record Mirror, Peter Jones described "My Little Lady" as "a bouncy little song... with a very fine backing. It's all rather staccato and impressive in the way that it builds". For Melody Maker, Chris Welch wrote that "trumpets are also the standout feature of this bright and inventive arrangement that has the Infectious qualities of some French pop records". For New Musical Express, Derek Johnson described the song as "rich in appealing harmonies and the song itself is much in the style of "Suddenly You Love You", which also stemmed from Italian sources. The melody is catchy and quick to register, and I'm sure you're all be humming it".

=== Track listing ===
7"

1. "My Little Lady" – 2:36
2. "All the World to Me" – 2:40

=== Charts ===
Chart (1968–69)	Peak position
Australia (Kent Music Report)	51
Austria (Ö3 Austria Top 40)	5
Belgium (Ultratop 50 Flanders)	1
Belgium (Ultratop 50 Wallonia)	2
Denmark (Danmarks Radio)	5
Finland (Suomen virallinen lista)	18
Germany (GfK)	2
Ireland (IRMA)	1
Malaysia (Radio Malaysia)	1
Netherlands (Dutch Top 40)	3
Netherlands (Single Top 100)	3
New Zealand (Listener)	1
Norway (VG-lista)	5
Rhodesia (Lyons Maid)	2
Singapore (Radio Singapore)	3
South Africa (Springbok Radio)	1
Spain (Promusicae)	5
Sweden (Kvällstoppen)	11
Sweden (Tio i Topp)	3
Switzerland (Schweizer Hitparade)	1
UK Melody Maker Top 30	5
UK New Musical Express Top 30	5
UK Record Retailer Top 50	6
US Bubbling Under the Hot 100 (Billboard)	127

== Joe Dassin version ==
"Ma Bonne Étoile"

Single by Joe Dassin

from the album Joe Dassin (Les Champs-Élysées)
- B-side: "Un peu comme toi"
- Released: 25 November 1968
- Genre: Chanson; pop
- Length: 2:37
- Label: CBS
- Songwriters: Daniele Pace; Mario Panzeri; Lorenzo Pilat; Pierre Delanoë
- Producer: Jacques Plait

Joe Dassin singles chronology
"Siffler sur la colline" (1968)	"Ma Bonne Étoile" (1968)	"Le Petit Pain au chocolat" (1968)

American singer-songwriter Joe Dassin released a French-language version of the song as a single in November 1968 from his album Joe Dassin (Les Champs-Élysées). It was adapted into French by Pierre Delanoë and featured an orchestra conducted by Johnny Arthey. It topped the charts in France for one week from 30 November to 6 December 1968. The B-side, "Un peu comme toi", is a French-language version of Johnny Nash's "Hold Me Tight".

=== Track listing ===
7"

1. "Ma Bonne Étoile" – 2:37
2. "Un peu comme toi" – 2:48

=== Charts ===
==== Weekly charts ====
Chart (1968–69)	Peak position
Belgium (Ultratop 50 Wallonia)	4
France (IFOP)	1
Quebec (BAnQ)	28

==== Year-end charts ====
Chart (1968)	Position
France (IFOP)	6

== Other versions ==
- In 1968 the organist Dorsey Dodd records the instrumental version on the album Intimità (Intimacy) (Vedette Records, VPAS 874)
- In 1968, Anni-Frid Lyngstad released a Swedish-language version, titled "Mycket kär", as her fourth single.
- In 1968, Yugoslav band Sanjalice released a Croatian-language version, titled "Ta mala ledi", on their EP Marijana.
- In 1968, Finnish singer Johnny Liebkind released a Finnish-language version, titled "Tyttö niinkuin pitää", as a single, which peaked at number 6 on the Finnish Singles Chart.
- In 1969, French orchestra leader Caravelli covered "Ma bonne étoile" on his album Eloïse.
- In 1969, Italian singer Gigliola Cinquetti covered the song on her album Il treno dell'amore.
- In 1996, German band Die Flippers released a German-language version, titled "Mexican Lady", on their album Liebe ist...mein erster Gedanke.
