= Joe Dassin (La Fleur aux dents) =

Studio album by Joe Dassin
- Released: August 4, 1970
- Genre: chanson
- Label: CBS Disques
- Producer: Jacques Plait

Joe Dassin chronology
Joe Dassin (Les Champs-Élysées) (1969)	Joe Dassin (La Fleur aux dents) (1970)	Joe Dassin (Elle était... Oh !) (1971)

Singles from Joe Dassin (La Fleur aux dents)
- 1. "L'Amérique" / "Cécilia" Released: 1970; 2. "C'est bon l'amour" Released: 1970; 3. "La Fleur aux dents" Released: 1971; 4. "L'Équipe à Jojo" Released: 1971

Joe Dassin (commonly called La Fleur aux dents after the first track on side 1) is the fourth French studio album by Joe Dassin. It came out in 1970 on CBS Disques.

== Commercial performance ==
According to U.S. Billboard (its 1 May 1971 issue), the long play sold over 250,000 copies in three months.

The LP reached no. 1 in France (according to the chart, courtesy of the Centre d'Information et de Documentation du Disque, that U.S. Billboard published in its "Hits of the World" section).

Also, according to a survey published by the already mentioned U.S. Billboard in its 8 July 1972 issue and based on the charts compiled by the Centre d'Information et de Documentation du Disque, Joe Dassin became the top album artist of the whole year 1971 in France.

== Track listing ==
Side 1
No.	Title	Writer(s)	Length
1.	"La Fleur aux dents"	Joe Dassin, Claude Lemesle	2:18
2.	"L'Équipe à Jojo"	Claude Lemesle	3:08
3.	"C'est bon l'amour" ("Cherry, Cherry")	Neil Diamond	2:30
4.	"Le Portugais"	Joe Dassin, Richelle Dassin, Pierre Delanoë	2:40
5.	"Le Grand Parking" ("Big Yellow Taxi")	Joni Mitchell	2:12
6.	"Un garçon nommé Suzy" ("A Boy Named Sue")	Shel Silverstein	3:08

Side 2
No.	Title	Writer(s)	Length
1.	"Au bout des rails" ("Cracklin' Rosie")	Neil Diamond	2:52
2.	"La Luzerne"	Joe Dassin, Pierre Delanoë	2:37
3.	"Un petit air de musique" ("We're All Playing in the Same Band")	Bert Sommer	3:05
4.	"Un cadeau de papa"	Joe Dassin, Claude Lemesle	2:18
5.	"Je la connais si bien"	Joe Dassin, Pierre Delanoë	3:05
6.	"L'Amérique" ("Yellow River")	Jeffrey Christie	3:27
