= Joe (Joe Dassin album) =

Studio album by Joe Dassin
- Released: August 18, 1972
- Genre: chanson
- Label: CBS Disques
- Producer: Jacques Plait

Joe Dassin chronology
Joe Dassin (Elle était... Oh !) (1971)	Joe (1972)	13 chansons nouvelles (1973)

Singles from Joe
- 1. "Taka takata (La Femme du toréro)" Released: 1972; 2. "La Complainte de l'heure de pointe (À vélo dans Paris)" Released: 1972; 3. "S'aimer sous la pluie" Released: 1973; 4. "Le Moustique" Released: 1973; 5. "Salut les amoureux" Released: 1973

Joe is the sixth French studio album by Joe Dassin. It came out in 1972 on CBS Disques.

== Commercial performance ==
The album reached at least the top 4 in Wallonia (French Belgium) and at least the top 10 in Finland (according to the charts, courtesy respectively of Telemoustique and Intro, U.S. Billboard published in its "Hits of the World" section).

== Track listing ==
Side 1
No.	Title	Writer(s)	Length
1.	"Le Moustique" ("The Mosquito")	John Densmore, Ray Manzarek, Robby Krieger	2:18
2.	"Salut les amoureux" ("City of New Orleans")	Steve Goodman (arranged by Arlo Guthrie)	4:00
3.	"Ma nana"	Pierre Delanoë, Joe Dassin	2:25
4.	"Vaya-na-cumana"	Jeff Barry, B. Blum	3:00
5.	"C'est ma tournée"	Richelle Dassin, Claude Lemesle and Daniel Vangarde	3:10
6.	"S'aimer sous la pluie"	Pierre Delanoë, Joe Dassin	3:00

Side 2
No.	Title	Writer(s)	Length
1.	"La Complainte de l'heure de pointe (À vélo dans Paris)"	Chris Juwens, Leon Deane	2:00
2.	"Un peu de paradis"	Claude Lemesle, Daniel Seff, Richard Sef	2:18
3.	"Louisiana"	Mat Camison	2:45
4.	"Julie, Julie"	Pierre Delanoë, Joe Dassin	2:12
5.	"Le Roi du blues"	Pierre Delanoë, Joe Dassin	3:03
6.	"Taka takata (La Femme du toréro)"	Al Verlane	3:03
