= Blue Country =

Studio album by Joe Dassin
- Released: August 18, 1979
- Genre: chanson
- Label: CBS Disques
- Producer: Jacques Plait

Joe Dassin chronology
15 ans déjà... (1978)	Blue Country (1979)	Home Made Ice Cream (1979)

Singles from Blue Country
- 1. "Faut pas faire de la peine à John" Released: 1979

Blue Country is the 13th and final French studio album by Joe Dassin. It was issued by CBS Records.

The album was released either in 1979 or January 1980. It marked Joe Dassin's final French album released during his lifetime. Blue Country featured a collaboration with American singer-songwriter Tony Joe White and also received an English-language release, which was the only one in Dassin's career, titled Home Made Ice Cream.

== Track listing ==
Side 1
No.	Title	Length
1.	"Blue Country" ("Home Made Ice Cream")
2.	"Faut pas faire de la peine à John" ("You Don't Mess Around with Jim")
3.	"Un baby, bébé" ("My Kind of Woman")
4.	"On se connaît par cœur" ("Promises")
5.	"Polk Salad Annie"

Side 2
No.	Title	Length
1.	"La fille du shérif" ("High Sheriff")
2.	"La saison du blues" ("The Change")
3.	"Joe macho" ("Lustful Earl and the Married Woman")
4.	"Si je dis "Je t'aime"" ("I've Got a Thing About You Baby")
5.	"Le marché aux puces" ("The Guitar Don't Lie")
