= Joe Dassin (Si tu t'appelles Mélancolie) =

Studio album by Joe Dassin
- Released: August 4, 1974
- Genre: chanson
- Labels: CBS Disques (France), RCA (Canada)
- Producer: Jacques Plait

Joe Dassin chronology
13 chansons nouvelles (1973)	Joe Dassin (Si tu t'appelles Mélancolie) (1974)	Joe Dassin (Le Costume blanc) (1975)

Singles from Joe Dassin (Si tu t'appelles Mélancolie)
- 1. "Si tu t'appelles Mélancolie / Vade retro" Released: 1974

Joe Dassin, commonly called Si tu t'appelles Mélancolie (lit. 'If your name is Melancholy') after the second track on side 1, is the eighth French studio album by Joe Dassin. It came out in 1974 on CBS Disques.

There was also a 1975 version that included the song "L'Été indien" (as the first track on side 1) instead of "Six jours à la campagne" *(that was the fourth track on side 1 in the original edition).

== Track listing ==
Side 1
No.	Title	Writer(s)	Length
1.	"Vade retro"	Joe Dassin	2:55
2.	"Si tu t'appelles Mélancolie"	Delanoe/Lemesle, Shepstone & Dibbens	3:17
3.	"Messieurs les jurés"	Billy Joel	3:00
4.	"Six jours à la campagne"	Hoyt Axton	2:50
5.	"L'amour etc."	Gordon Lightfoot	2:36
6.	"Entre deux adieux"	Cyril Assous, Joe Dassin	2:41

Side 2
No.	Title	Writer(s)	Length
1.	"Le Service militaire"	Danny Sanderson	2:25
2.	"Annie de l'année dernière"	Georges Chatelain, Joe Dassin	2:45
3.	"Marie-Madeleine"	B. Parker, T. Moeller	3:30
4.	"Ce n'est rien que du vent"	Joe Dassin	4:15
5.	"Je te crois"	Cyril Assous	2:15
6.	"Ma dernière chanson pour toi"	A. Labacci	2:40
