= L'Équipe à Jojo =

Single by Joe Dassin

from the album Joe Dassin (La Fleur aux dents)
- A-side: "L'Équipe à Jojo"
- B-side: "Le Portugais"
- Released: 1971
- Genre: Chanson, pop
- Length: 3:08
- Label: CBS Disques
- Songwriter(s): Claude Lemesle
- Producer(s): Jacques Plait

Joe Dassin singles chronology
"La Fleur aux dents" (1971)	"L'Équipe à Jojo" (1971)	"Elle était oh !" (1971)

Music video
- "L'équipe à Jojo" (French TV, 1977) on YouTube

"L'Équipe à Jojo" is a song by Joe Dassin from his 1970 album Joe Dassin (La Fleur aux dents). In 1971 it was released as a single.

== Writing and composition ==
The song was written and composed by Claude Lemesle. He wrote it when he was just 25 and still feels a particular tenderness towards it. Lemesle recalled to Le Figaro:

I wrote it when I was very young, at 25. I wrote [both] the lyrics and the music. It really resembles me. I wanted to call it "La bande à Jojo", but since Joe had already done "La bande à Bonnot", there was too much similarity between the two titles. Forty-seven years later it holds on, I still love it. It embodies the philosophy of the 1960–1970 era, but I did not realize it [back then]. It joined a song by Pierre Delanoë I adore, "Soiree de prince". Mine is more festive, it represents another mood of the [same] era.

== Commercial performance ==
Unlike the album Joe Dassin (La Fleur aux dents), the single "L'Équipe à Jojo" didn't sell well.

== Track listing ==
7" single CBS 7151 (1971)

A. "L'équipe à Jojo" (3:08)
B. "Le Portugais" (2:40)

== Cover versions ==
The song was covered by Les Objets on the various-artists compilation album L'équipe à JoJo – Les Chansons de Joe Dassin par... (1993).
