= Joe Dassin à New York =

Studio album by Joe Dassin
- Released: August 4, 1966
- Genre: chanson
- Label: CBS Disques
- Producer: Jacques Plait

Joe Dassin chronology
Joe Dassin à New York (1966)	Les Deux Mondes de Joe Dassin (1967)

Singles from Joe Dassin à New York
- 1. "Ça m'avance à quoi ?" Released: 1966; 2. "Guantanamera" Released: 1966; 3. "Excuse Me Lady" Released: 1966; 4. "Vive moi" Released: 1966

Professional ratings
Review scores
Source	Rating
AllMusic	3/5 stars

Joe Dassin à New York is the debut French studio album by Joe Dassin. It came out in 1966 on CBS Disques.

== Track listing ==
Side 1
No.	Title	Writer(s)	Length
1.	"Excuse Me, Lady" ("Excuse Me Baby")	Artie Wayne	2:22
2.	"Sometime Lovin'"	Gary Shearston	2:38
3.	"Guantanamera"	Hector Angulo, José Martí, Pete Seeger	2:59
4.	"Je change un peu de vent" ("Freight Train")	Jean-Michel Rivat, Joe Dassin	2:18
5.	"Celle que j'oublie"	Camille Monte, Estelle Levitt	2:30
6.	"Comme la lune" ("Four Kinds of Lonely")	Lee Hazlewood	3:30

Side 2
No.	Title	Writer(s)	Length
1.	"Petite mama" ("Mama")	Mark Charron	2:30
2.	"Joli minou"	Jean-Michel Rivat, Joe Dassin, Georges Liferman	2:05
3.	"Dans la brume du matin" ("Early Morning Rain")	Gordon Lightfoot	3:20
4.	"Vive moi !" ("Turn Down Day")	David Blume, Jerry Keller	2:30
5.	"Katy Cruel"	Chanson traditionnelle	1:52
6.	"Ça m'avance à quoi" ("You Were on My Mind")	Sylvia Fricker	2:30
