= Les Deux Mondes de Joe Dassin =

Studio album by Joe Dassin
- Released: August 4, 1967
- Genre: chanson
- Label: CBS Disques
- Producer: Jacques Plait

Joe Dassin chronology
Joe Dassin à New York (1966)	Les Deux Mondes de Joe Dassin (1967)	Joe Dassin (Les Champs-Élysées) (1969)

Singles from Les Deux Mondes de Joe Dassin
- 1. "Les Dalton" Released: 1967; 2. "Marie-Jeanne" Released: 1967

Les Deux Mondes de Joe Dassin (or The Two Worlds of Joe Dassin) is the second French studio album by Joe Dassin. It came out in 1967 on CBS.

Half the songs on the album were in French, and half the songs were in English.

== Track listing ==
Side 1
No.	Title	Writer(s)	Length
1.	"Les Dalton"	Jean-Michel Rivat, Joe Dassin, Frank Thomas	2:36
2.	"Pauvre Doudou"	The Smokes	2:42
3.	"Tout bébé a besoin d'une maman"	Jean-Michel Rivat, Joe Dassin, Frank Thomas	3:04
4.	"The Last Thing on My Mind"	Tom Paxton	2:56
5.	"Saint James Infirmary Blues"	Joe Dassin, traditional	3:09
6.	"L'Ombre d'un amour"	Claude Lemesle, Joe Dassin	2:51

Side 2
No.	Title	Writer(s)	Length
1.	"Paper Heart"	Jean-Michel Rivat, Joe Dassin, Leon Pober	2:13
2.	"Marie-Jeanne" ("Ode to Billie Joe")	Bobbie Gentry	4:14
3.	"Hello! Hello!"	Peter Kraemer, Terry MacNeil	2:18
4.	"My Funny Valentine"	Richard Rodgers, Lorenz Hart	4:14
5.	"Viens voir le loup"	Jean-Michel Rivat, Joe Dassin, Frank Thomas	2:56
