= Riccardo Del Turco =

Italian singer (born 1939)

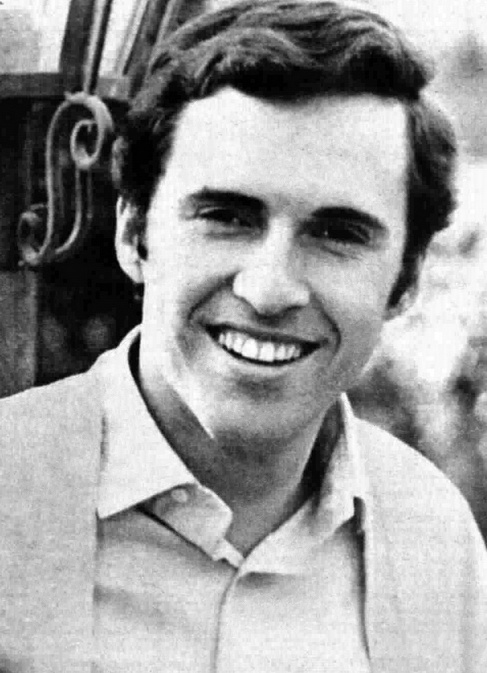
- Del Turco in Radiocorriere magazine (1965)

Background information
- Born: 7 September 1939 (age 87); Fiesole, Florence, Kingdom of Italy
- Genres: Pop, Rock
- Years active: 1955–present
- Labels: RCA Italiana, CGD, Dischi Ricordi, Fonit Cetra

Riccardo Del Turco (born 7 September 1939) is an Italian singer-songwriter and record producer, best known for the song "Luglio".

== Life and career ==
Born in Fiesole, at young age Del Turco started studying composition and singing, and in 1957 he entered the Riccardo Rauchi Orchestra. Noted by producer Nanni Ricordi during a concert in Cortina d'Ampezzo, in 1962 he was put under contract by RCA.

After some poorly received singles that Del Turco co-wrote with established composers such as Gino Paoli, Sergio Endrigo and Gianni Meccia, he got his first hits in 1966 with "Figlio unico", a cover of Adoniran Barbosa's "Trem das Onze", and in 1967 with "Uno tranquillo". In 1968, he got his major hit with "Luglio", which topped the Italian Hit Parade Singles Chart for two weeks in July 1968, selling over 500,000 copies. "Luglio"'s tune was marketed across Europe and was covered by The Tremeloes, Herman's Hermits, Joe Dassin, and Bengt Huhta. In 1969, he took part in the Sanremo Music Festival with "Cosa hai messo nel caffè", but the song and the following singles failed to repeat the success of "Luglio", and led to Del Turco's decision of semi-retiring in 1973, to devote himself to managing a bar in Florence.

Del Turco made a comeback in the early 1980s, participating in two editions of the Sanremo Music Festival, in 1982 with "Non voglio ali" and in 1984 with "Serena alienazione", and then co-founding the group Superquattro, together with Jimmy Fontana, Nico Fidenco and Gianni Meccia.

Also active as a songwriter for other artists, Del Turco wrote songs for Andrea Bocelli, Mina, Ornella Vanoni, Patty Pravo, and Riccardo Fogli, among others.

== Discography ==
=== 33 rpm ===
- Riccardo Del Turco, 1969
- Tanto io non vinco mai, 1973

=== 45 rpm ===
- Le cose che non ci diciamo/La nostra casa, 1962
- M'hanno detto che/Dimmi se vuoi, 1964
- Parla di te/Non chiudere la porta, 1964
- Figlio unico/Quanto amore, 1966
- Uno tranquillo/Allora hai vinto tu, 1967
- L'importante è la rosa/Se è scritto nel cielo, 16 October 1967
- Luglio/Il temporale, 1968
- Cosa hai messo nel caffè/Commedia, 2 January 1969
- Il compleanno/Geloso, 23 aprile 1969
- Due biglietti perchè/Se non hai pensato, 1970
- Babilonia/Non ti voglio amare, 1970
- La cicala/Nel giardino dietro casa, 1971
- Uno, nessuno/La domenica ti penso di più, 1972
- Tanto io non vinco mai/L'appartamento, 1973
- Tanto io non vinco mai/La musica sta arrivando, 1973
- The Summer Of Mary Ann/Ramona, 1976
- Winter Flower/Sette e ventinove, 1979
- Non voglio ali/Noi due, 1982
- Serena alienazione/Spazio profondo, 1984

== Filmography ==
- Io non protesto, io amo, 1967
- Il professor Matusa e i suoi hippies, 1968
