= The Mosquito (song) =

1972 single by the Doors

- Argentine single sleeve

Single by the Doors

from the album Full Circle
- B-side: "It Slipped My Mind"
- Released: September 1972
- Recorded: May 1972 - June 1972
- Studio: A&M, Hollywood
- Genre: Psychedelic rock; latin rock
- Length: 5:16 (album version); 2:47 (single version)
- Label: Elektra
- Songwriters: John Densmore; Robby Krieger; Ray Manzarek
- Producer: The Doors

The Doors singles chronology
"Get Up and Dance"/"Treetrunk" (1972)	"The Mosquito" (1972)	"The Piano Bird" (1972)

"The Mosquito" is a song by American rock band the Doors from their 1972 album Full Circle. In the same year it was released as a single. Billboard called it an "unusual off beat disc" with a "clever Latin beat". Record World called it an "infectious ditty with calypso feel." The vocal is by Robby Krieger.

== Personnel ==
- Robby Krieger – guitar, lead vocals
- Ray Manzarek – keyboards
- John Densmore – drums
- Leland Sklar – bass

== Charts ==
Chart (1972)	Peak position
Austria (Ö3 Austria Top 40)	15
Canada Top Singles (RPM)	73
Finland (Suomen Virallinen)	15
Netherlands (Single Top 100)	17
West Germany (GfK)	25
US Billboard Hot 100	85

== Joe Dassin version ==
"Le Moustique"

Single by Joe Dassin

from the album Joe
- Language: French (adapted by Pierre Delanoë)
- B-side: "C'est ma tournée"; "La Complainte de l'heure de pointe (À vélo dans Paris)"
- Released: 1973
- Label: CBS Disques
- Songwriters: John Densmore; Robby Krieger; Ray Manzarek
- Producer: Jacques Plait

Joe Dassin singles chronology
"S'aimer sous la pluie" (1973)	"Le Moustique" (1973)	"Salut les amoureux" (1973)

A French-language version was recorded by Joe Dassin as "Le Moustique") with lyrics adaptated by Pierre Delanoë. It was included on his 1972 album Joe and in 1973 released as a single.

Charts

The single "Le Moustique" by Joe Dassin reached at least the top 10 in France and at least the top 5 in Finland (according to the charts, courtesy respectively of the Centre d'Information et de Documentation du Disque and of Intro, that U.S. Billboard published in its "Hits of the World" section).

Chart (1973)	Peak position
Belgium (Ultratop Wallonia)	8
France (SNEP Streaming)	10
