= City of New Orleans (song) =

1972 single by Steve Goodman

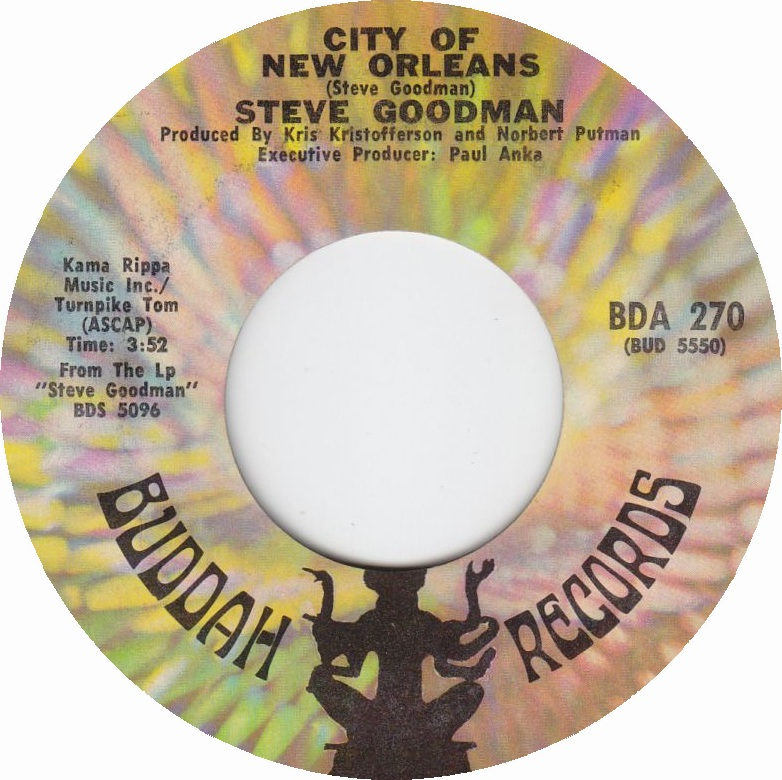
- Side A of the original US single

Single by Steve Goodman

from the album Steve Goodman
- B-side: "Would You Like to Learn to Dance?"
- Written: 1970
- Released: January 1972
- Recorded: 1971
- Studio: Quadrafonic, Nashville, TN
- Genre: Country folk
- Length: 3:52
- Label: Buddah
- Songwriter: Steve Goodman
- Producers: Kris Kristofferson, Norbert Putnam, Paul Anka (exec.)

Steve Goodman singles chronology
"City of New Orleans" (1972)	"Election Year Rag" (1972)

Audio
- "City of New Orleans" (1999 remaster) on YouTube

"City of New Orleans" is a country folk song written by Steve Goodman (and first recorded for Goodman's self-titled 1971 album), describing a train ride from Chicago to New Orleans on the Illinois Central Railroad's City of New Orleans in bittersweet and nostalgic terms.

Goodman got the idea while traveling on the Illinois Central line for a visit to his wife's family. The song has been recorded by numerous artists in the United States, including two major hit versions: first by Arlo Guthrie in 1972, and later by Willie Nelson in 1984. Goodman posthumously won the songwriting Grammy Award for Nelson's version. In Europe, his melody has most often been used with original foreign language lyrics, rather than translations of Goodman's lyrics.

An article in the September 2017 issue of Trains magazine chronicles the writing and recording of the song and includes a biographical sketch of Steve Goodman. In June 2026, CBS News included the song in its list of the 250 essential American songs of the past 250 years. The opening line of the song's chorus, "Good morning, America, how are you?", serves as the namesake for the long-running ABC News program Good Morning America (GMA).

== Arlo Guthrie version ==
"The City of New Orleans"
- Side A of the New Zealand single

Single by Arlo Guthrie

from the album Hobo's Lullaby
- B-side: "Days Are Short"
- Released: June 1972
- Recorded: Late 1971
- Genre: Folk
- Length: 4:31
- Label: Reprise
- Songwriter: Steve Goodman
- Producers: Lenny Waronker, John Pilla

Arlo Guthrie singles chronology
"Ballad of Tricky Fred" (1971)	"The City of New Orleans" (1972)	"Ukulele Lady" (1972)

Audio
- "The City of New Orleans" (2004 remaster) on YouTube

While at the bar of the Quiet Knight in Chicago, Goodman saw Arlo Guthrie, and asked to be allowed to play a song for him. Guthrie grudgingly agreed, on the condition that if Goodman bought him a beer, Guthrie would listen to him play for as long as it took to drink the beer. Goodman played "City of New Orleans", which Guthrie liked enough that he asked to record it. The song was a hit for Guthrie on his 1972 album Hobo's Lullaby, reaching Number 4 on the Billboard Easy Listening chart and Number 18 on the Hot 100; it would prove to be Guthrie's only top-40 hit and one of only two he would have on the Hot 100 (the other was a severely shortened and rearranged version of his magnum opus, "Alice's Restaurant", which hit Number 97). In New Zealand, "City of New Orleans" spent two weeks at number one, charting throughout the winter of 1973.

In December 2005, sparked by the news the train was back in service after Hurricane Katrina, the Arlo Guthrie and Friends tour traveled by the train itself in a benefit concert tour to aid musicians who lost everything in the hurricane.

Guthrie's version of "The City of New Orleans" was inducted into the Grammy Hall of Fame in 2017.

=== Weekly charts ===
Chart (1972–1973)	Peak position
Canada RPM Top Singles	11
Canada RPM Adult Contemporary	14
New Zealand (Listener)	1
US Billboard Hot 100	18
U.S. Billboard Easy Listening	4
Australia (Kent Music Report)	58

=== Year-end charts ===
Chart (1972)	Rank
U.S. Billboard Hot 100	45

== Willie Nelson version ==
"City of New Orleans"
- Side A of the 1984 Canadian single

Single by Willie Nelson

from the album City of New Orleans
- B-side: "Why Are You Pickin' on Me"
- Released: July 30, 1984
- Recorded: October 1983
- Genre: Country
- Length: 4:48
- Label: Columbia
- Songwriter: Steve Goodman
- Producer: Chips Moman

Willie Nelson singles chronology
"To All the Girls I've Loved Before" (1984)	"City of New Orleans" (1984)	"Seven Spanish Angels" (1984)

Audio
- "City of New Orleans" on YouTube

Steve Goodman won a posthumous Grammy Award for Best Country Song at the 27th Grammy Awards in 1985 for Willie Nelson's version, which was included as the title track on Nelson's 1984 album City of New Orleans. It reached #1 on both the Billboard Hot Country Singles chart in the United States and the RPM Country Tracks chart in Canada.

=== Chart performance ===
Chart (1984)	Peak position
US Hot Country Songs (Billboard)	1
US Adult Contemporary (Billboard)	30
Canadian RPM Country Tracks	1
Canadian RPM Adult Contemporary Tracks	5

== Foreign-language versions ==
=== French version ===
"Salut les amoureux"

Single by Joe Dassin

from the album Joe
- Language: French
- English title: Hi, lovebirds
- B-side: "S'aimer sous la pluie"
- Released: March 1973
- Recorded: 1972
- Genre: Chanson
- Length: 4:00
- Label: CBS
- Composer: Steve Goodman
- Lyricists: Claude Lemesle, Richelle Dassin
- Producer: Jacques Plait

Joe Dassin singles chronology
"Le Moustique" (1973)	"Salut les amoureux" (1973)	"Je t'aime, je t'aime" (1973)

Audio
- "Salut les amoureux" on YouTube

Live video
- "Salut les amoureux" (Top à Gérard Lenorman, 1973) on YouTube

Also in 1972, the song was adapted into the French language as "Salut les amoureux" (translation: "Hi, lovebirds") by Claude Lemesle and Richelle Dassin and performed by the latter's brother, American singer Joe Dassin, appearing on his album Joe and released as a single the following year in 1973, backed by another track from the album, "S'aimer sous la pluie" (which Dassin co-wrote with Pierre Delanoë, meaning "Loving each other in the rain"). Dassin sings the last line of the chorus a fourth lower than the original on a conventional IV-V-I chord progression. The single was a success, peaking at Number 8 in France and Number 12 in Wallonia (French Belgium), selling over 200,000 copies. It is not a direct translation of the original, addressing the end of a short relationship, of which Lemesle took inspiration from his breakup with fellow French singer Valentine "Vava" Saint-Jean.

=== Charts ===
Chart (1973)	Peak position
France (CIDD)	8
Belgium (Ultratop 50 Wallonia)	12

=== Dutch version ===
"'t Is weer voorbij die mooie zomer"

Single by Gerard Cox

from the album De Beste Van Gerard Cox
- Language: Dutch
- English title: That beautiful summer is over again
- B-side: "Zullen we ritselen?"
- Written: 1973
- Released: October 1973
- Recorded: 1973
- Genre: Pop
- Length: 4:30
- Label: CBS
- Composer: Steve Goodman
- Lyricist: Gerard Cox
- Producer: Ruud Jacobs

Gerard Cox singles chronology
"Morgen Word Het Beter" (1973)	"'t Is weer voorbij die mooie zomer" (1973)	"Die Goeie Ouwe Tijd" (1973)

Music video
- "'t Is weer voorbij die mooie zomer" on YouTube

"Nederland is helemaal oranje"

Single by Wilfred Genee and Johan Derksen
- English title: The Netherlands is completely orange
- Released: April 26, 2012
- Genre: Pop, novelty
- Length: 3:35
- Label: FBR/NRGY
- Composer: Steve Goodman
- Lyricist: Ferdi Bolland
- Producer: Ferdi Bolland

Wilfred Genee and Johan Derksen singles chronology
"Nederland is helemaal oranje" (2012)	"Helden" (2012)

Music video
- "Nederland is helemaal oranje" on YouTube

Also in 1973, Dutch singer and CBS Records labelmate Gerard Cox released a Dutch-language cover entitled "'t Is weer voorbij die mooie zomer" (translation: "That beautiful summer is over again") as a single from his greatest hits album De Beste Van Gerard Cox (translation: The Best of Gerard Cox). The single was a Top 10 hit in the Dutchophone markets, reaching Number 1 in the Netherlands and Number 2 in Flanders (Dutch Belgium). The Dutch lyrics are not about a train or a short relationship, but are a look back on the warm days of summer. Cox based his version on the French version, Salut les amoureux by Dassin, which he had heard while on vacation at a nightclub in France. Yet, the Dutch lyrics are again very different from both the English and the French versions. The single's B-side, "Zullen we ritselen?" (translation: "Shall we sort something out?"), composed by Rogier van Otterloo and also featured on the aforementioned compilation, was previously featured on Cox's 1972 album Vrijblijvend... (translation: No-obligation...). Cox's version has also been parodied by Sports journalists Wilfred Genee and Johan Derksen in 2012 as "Nederland is helemaal oranje" (translation: "The Netherlands is completely orange"), a song about the Netherlands national football team written and produced by Ferdi Bolland and recorded specially for that year's UEFA Euro, which was released as a non-album single, peaking at Number 4 on the Single Top 100 and selling over 25,000 copies.

=== Charts ===
Chart (1973–1974)	Peak position
Netherlands (Single Top 100)	1
Belgium (Ultratop 50 Flanders)	2

Chart (2012)	Peak position
Netherlands (Single Top 100)	4

=== German version ===
"Wann wird's mal wieder richtig Sommer?"

Single by Rudi Carrell

from the album Rudi Carrell
- Language: German
- English title: When will it finally be a real summer again?
- B-side: "Heul nicht"
- Released: March 1975
- Genre: Pop
- Length: 4:20
- Label: Ariola
- Composer: Steve Goodman
- Lyricist: Thomas Woitkewitsch
- Producer: Thomas Woitkewitsch

Rudi Carrell singles chronology
"Trimm Dich Und Halte Dich Fit" (1971)	"Wann wird's mal wieder richtig Sommer?" (1975)	"La la la" (1975)

Audio
- "Wann wird's mal wieder richtig Sommer?" (2026 remaster) on YouTube

Live video
- "Wann wird's mal wieder richtig Sommer?" (German TV, 1975) on YouTube

"Wann wird's mal wieder richtig Sommer?"

Single by Creme 21

from the album Creme 21 (30% Mehr)
- B-side: "Ich kann mich nicht entscheiden" "Ich will auch mit (in den Übungsraum)"
- Released: April 15, 1996
- Recorded: 1995
- Genre: Pop rock
- Length: 3:24
- Label: Epic
- Composer: Steve Goodman
- Lyricist: Thomas Woitkewitsch
- Producer: Jeo

Creme 21 singles chronology
"Liebe In Den Neunzigern ('96)" (1996)	"Wann wird's mal wieder richtig Sommer?" (1996)	"Verdammt Lang Her" (1997)

Music video
- "Wann wird's mal wieder richtig Sommer?" on YouTube

In 1975, Dutch singer Rudi Carrell released a German-language cover with lyrics by producer Thomas Woitkewitsch. The lyrics were based on the Dutch version (see above) by Gerard Cox. The lead single off of Carrell's 1975 self-titled album, "Wann wird's mal wieder richtig Sommer?" (translation: "When will it finally be a real summer again?"), stayed on the West German record charts for 14 weeks, peaking at Number 18. This version has since been widely covered in the Germanophone market, spawning a German Top-40 recording by Creme 21 (as a tribute to Carrell) in 1996. Creme 21, a pop rock band from Frankfurt am Main, recorded a version, using Woitkewitsch's German lyrics, appearing on re-issues of the band's 1995 self-titled debut studio album (a.k.a. 30% Mehr, meaning 30% More). The cover spent 12 weeks on the German record charts, peaking at Number 36. It was accompanied by a music video, directed by Andreas Kidess, paying tribute to Carrell, the original performer of the adaptation, who makes a cameo in the video, also featuring footage of old Rudi Carrell shows. Creme 21 also promoted their version with a performance on Die Harald Schmidt Show.

=== Charts ===
Chart (1975)	Peak position
West Germany (GfK)	18

Chart (1996)	Peak position
Germany (GfK)	36

== Other notable versions ==
- Dolly Parton performed the song in a 1977 episode of her short-lived TV show Dolly.
- In September 2005, Jimmy Buffett and the Coral Reefer Band closed their Labor Day weekend performance at Wrigley Field with the song; Buffett referenced the ongoing impact of Hurricane Katrina and dedicated the song to the people of New Orleans and the wider Gulf Coast region. In May 2006, Buffett opened his set with the song at the first New Orleans Jazz & Heritage Festival following Hurricane Katrina.
- Former Bro'Sis member Indira Weis covered the German adaptation, Wann wird's mal wieder richtig Sommer? (see above), as her debut solo single, which was released in September 2009, covering the song as a fan of Carrell's and in irony of her experiences that summer, as well as promoting and performing it at that year's Oktoberfest with then-Chancellor Angela Merkel present. Despite heavy publicity, Weis' version failed to chart.
- The song was also covered by American punk band Me First and the Gimme Gimmes on their 2017 compilation album Rake It In: The Greatestest Hits.
- In June 2025, the German version was parodied by punk bands ZSK and Rogers in the anti-AfD single "Sommer ohne Nazis" ("Summer Without Nazis") and was featured on the former's eighth studio album Feuer & Papier (Fire & Paper) later that year.

== See also ==
- List of train songs
- List of 1970s one-hit wonders in the United States

Mentioned in the song

- Mail car
- Kankakee, Illinois
- Club car
- Pullman porter
- Memphis, Tennessee
- "Passengers will please refrain"
