= Home Made Ice Cream =

Studio album by Joe Dassin
- Released: 1979
- Label: CBS
- Producer: Jacques Plait

Joe Dassin chronology
Blue Country (1979)	Home Made Ice Cream (1979)	Le meilleur de Joe Dassin (1995)

Home Made Ice Cream was a 1979 album by Joe Dassin. The disc was originally issued by CBS Canada. Many of the songs, including the title track, were written by Tony Joe White whose 1969 hit "Polk Salad Annie" is also covered in this collection.

Home Made Ice Cream was a rare album in which Dassin sang in his native English language; the American-born singer otherwise recorded the vast majority of his music in French, as Dassin had lived most of his adult life in France, where he had become a major star. Dassin's concurrent album Blue Country included the same songs, recorded in French. Home Made Ice Cream was his fifth and final foreign-language, lone English, and Eighteenth overall studio album.

== Track listing ==
=== Side A ===
- Home Made Ice Cream 3:30
- You Don't Mess Around With Jim 3:15
- My Kind Of Woman 2:58
- Promises 3:32
- Polk Salad Annie 4:20

=== Side B ===
- The Guitar Don't Lie 4:14
- High Sheriff 3:40
- The Change 3:20
- Lustful Earl And The Married Woman 3:27
- I've Got A Thing About You Baby 2:44
