= Marie (Cat Mother and the All Night Newsboys song) =

1969 single by Cat Mother and the All Night Newsboys

Single by Cat Mother and the All Night Newsboys

from the album The Street Giveth... And The Street Taketh Away
- A-side: "Can You Dance To It?"
- Released: May 1969
- Label: Polydor

"C'est la vie, Lily"

Single by Joe Dassin
- Language: French
- A-side: "C'est la vie, Lily"; "Billy le Bordelais"
- Released: January 1970
- Label: CBS Disques
- Songwriter: French adaptation: Pierre Delanoë

Joe Dassin singles chronology
"Les Champs-Élysées" (1969)	"C'est la vie, Lily" / "Billy le Bordelais" (1970)	"L'Amérique" / "Cécilia" (1970)

Music video
- "C'est la vie, Lily" (French TV, 1970) on YouTube

"Marie" is a song, originally recorded by Cat Mother and the All Night Newsboys on their 1969 album The Street Giveth... And The Street Taketh Away. In the same year it was released on the B-side of the single "Can You Dance to It?".

Soon it was adapted into French (under the title "C'est la vie, Lily") by Pierre Delanoë. The French version was released in 1970 by Joe Dassin.

== Background and writing ==
The original was produced by Jimi Hendrix and Cat Mother.

== Commercial performance ==
According to the charts, courtesy of the Centre d'Information et de Documentation du Disque, that U.S. Billboard published in its "Hits of the World" section), the song "C'est la vie Lily" by Joe Dassin reached at least the top 6 in France (in the national [i.e. domestic] singles chart).

== Track listings ==
=== Joe Dassin version ===
7" single "C'est la vie, Lily / Billy Le Bordelais" CBS 4736

A. "C'est la vie, Lily" (3:03)
B. "Billy le Bordelais" (4:02)

== See also ==
- List of number-one singles of 1970 (France)
