= Joe Dassin (Elle était... Oh!) =

Joe Dassin (Elle était… Oh !)

Studio album by Joe Dassin
- Released: August 4, 1971
- Genre: chanson
- Label: CBS Disques
- Producer: Jacques Plait

Joe Dassin chronology
Joe Dassin (La Fleur aux dents) (1970)	Joe Dassin (Elle était… Oh !) (1971)	Joe (1972)

Singles from Joe Dassin
- 1. "Elle était... Oh !" Released: 1972; 2. "Bye Bye Louis" Released: 1972

Joe Dassin (commonly called Elle était… Oh ! after the first track on side 2) is the fifth French studio album by Joe Dassin. It came out in 1971 on CBS Disques.

== Commercial performance ==
The album reached at least the top 3 in Wallonia (French-speaking Belgium) and the top 10 in France (according to the charts, courtesy respectively of Telemoustique and of Centre d'Information et de Documentation du Disque, U.S. Billboard published in its "Hits of the World" section).

According to a survey published by U.S. Billboard in its 8 July 1972 issue and based on the charts compiled by Centre d'Information et de Documentation du Disque, Joe Dassin was the top album artist of 1971 in France.

== Track listing ==
Side 1
No.	Title	Writer(s)	Length
1.	"La Ligne de vie"	Claude Lemesle, Joe Dassin, Richelle Dassin	3:10
2.	"La Mal-Aimée du courrier du cœur"	Claude Lemesle, Eric Wolfson, Richelle Dassin	2:45
3.	"Bye Bye Louis"	Joe Dassin, Richelle Dassin	3:28
4.	"Allez roulez !"	Joe Dassin, Pierre Delanoë	3:05
5.	"Sylvie"	Claude Lemesle, Joe Dassin, Richelle Dassin	3:05
6.	"Les Joies de la cuisine"	Charles Dilenis, Claude Lemesle, Furry Lewis, Terry Garthwaite, Toni Brown	2:50

Side 2
No.	Title	Writer(s)	Length
1.	"Elle était... Oh !"	Joe Dassin, Pierre Delanoë	4:10
2.	"Le Chanteur des rues"	Claude Lemesle, Joe Dassin, Richelle Dassin	2:35
3.	"À la santé d'hier"	Joe Dassin, Pierre Delanoë	3:05
4.	"Pauvre Pierrot"	Joe Dassin, Pierre Delanoë	2:40
5.	"Si tu peux lire en moi"	Gordon Lightfoot, Pierre Delanoë	3:08
6.	"Le général a dit"	Alice Dona, Claude Lemesle, Michel Mallory	3:08
