= ZSK (band) =

German punk band

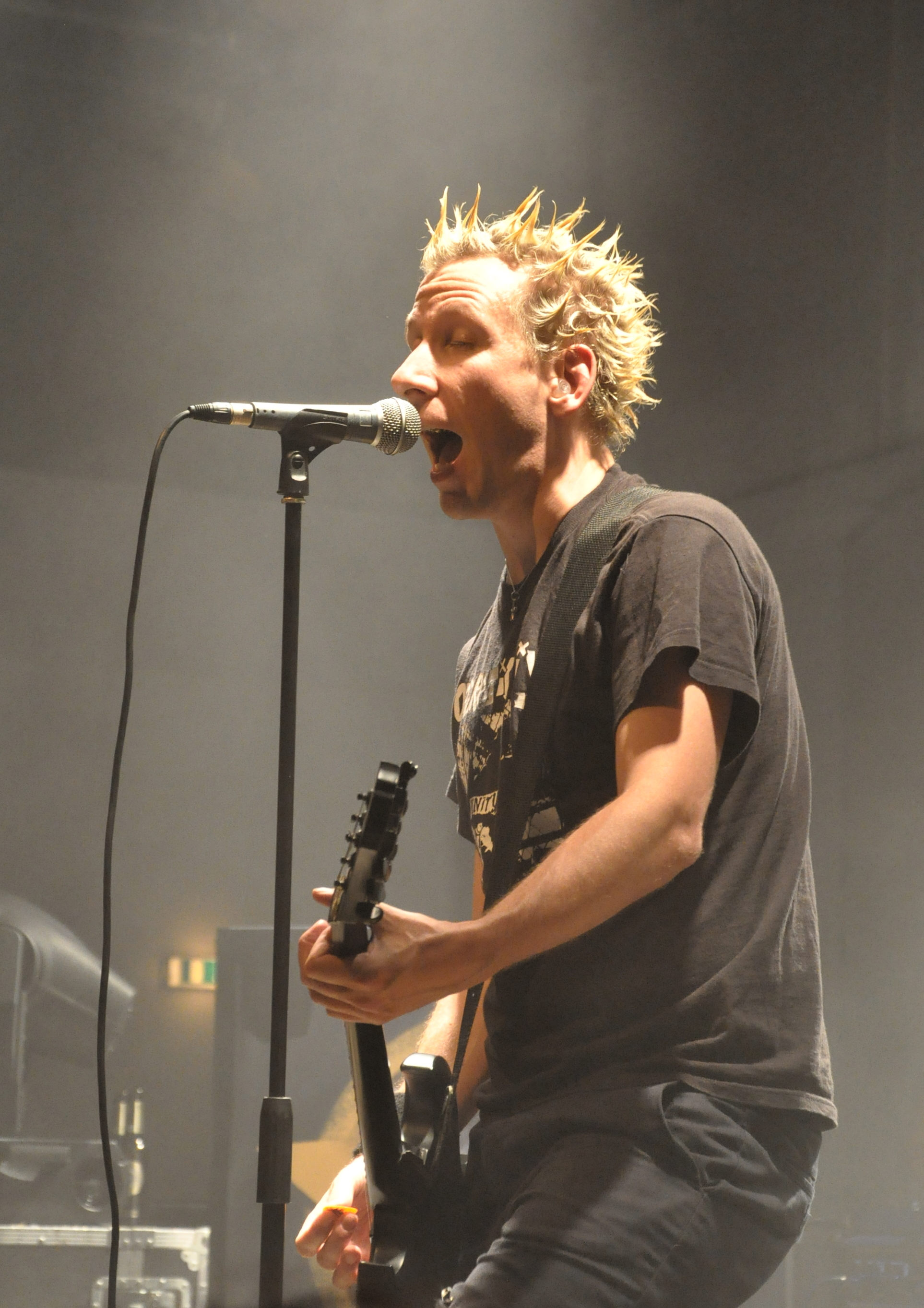
Band member Joshi, Düsseldorf, 2013

ZSK is a German skate punk band. They have released eight albums, successively on Wolverine Records, Bitzcore, People Like You Records, Century Media Records and Hamburg Records.

The band, originally from Göttingen, split up in 2007, only to reunite later.

== Discography ==
=== Albums ===
- Riot Radio (2002)
- From Protest To Resistance (2004)
- Discontent Hearts And Gasoline (2006)
- Herz Für Die Sache (2013)
- Hallo Hoffnung (2018)
- Ende Der Welt (2021)
- Hass↯Liebe (2023)
- Feuer & Papier (2025)

=== Other ===
- Split album with Blowing Fuse (1999)
- Wenn so viele schweigen, müssen wir noch lauter schreien (DVD, 2007)

== External link ==
- Discogs

=== Further reading ===
- Review of From Protest To Resistance by Burn Your Ears (in German)
- Review of Herz Für Die Sache by Burn Your Ears (in German)
- Review of Herz Für Die Sache by Pressure Magazine (in German)
- Review of Ende Der Welt by CYB Magazine (in German)
- Review of Ende Der Welt by Krachfink (in German)
- Review of Ende Der Welt by Tough Magazine (in German)
- Review of Ende Der Welt by Popmonitor(in German)
- Review of Hass↯Liebe by Stormbringer.at (in German)
- Review of Hass↯Liebe by Frontstage Magazine (in German)
- Review of Hass↯Liebe by Obliveon (in German)
- Review of Hass↯Liebe by Burn Your Ears (in German)
- Review of Feuer & Papier by Frontstage Magazine (in German)
- Review of Feuer & Papier by Tough Magazine(in German)
