= Luglio =

1968 single by Riccardo Del Turco

Single by Riccardo Del Turco

from the album Riccardo Del Turco
- B-side: "Il temporale"
- Released: April 1968
- Genre: Pop
- Length: 3:05
- Label: CGD
- Songwriters: Giancarlo Bigazzi; Riccardo Del Turco

Riccardo Del Turco singles chronology
"L'importante è la rosa" (1968)	"Luglio" (1968)	"Cosa hai messo nel caffè" (1969)

Music video
- "Luglio" (audio) on YouTube

"Luglio" (Italian pronunciation: [ˈluʎʎo]; "July") is a 1968 song by Riccardo Del Turco. The song won the Un disco per l'estate competition and was awarded the Golden Gondola at the International Light Music Exhibition, marking Del Turco's breakout and becoming his signature song. The single sold over 500,000 copies.

== Track listing ==
7" single (CBS – 3587)

1. "Luglio" (R. Del Turco, G. Bigazzi) – 3:05
2. "Il temporale" (R. Del Turco, G. Bigazzi, Mogol, L. Enríquez Bacalov) – 3:07

== Charts ==
Chart	Peak position
Italy (Musica e dischi)	2

== Cover versions ==
=== Le Petit Pain au chocolat ===
"Le Petit Pain au chocolat"

Single by Joe Dassin

from the album Joe Dassin (Les Champs-Élysées)
- B-side: "Le Temps des œufs au plat"
- Released: November 1968
- Genre: Chanson; pop
- Length: 3:30
- Label: CBS Disques
- Songwriters: Giancarlo Bigazzi; Riccardo Del Turco
- Lyricist: Pierre Delanoë
- Producer: Jacques Plait

Joe Dassin singles chronology
"Ma Bonne Étoile" (1968)	"Le Petit Pain au chocolat" (1968)	"Le Chemin de papa / Les Champs-Élysées" (1969)

Music video
- "Le petit pain au chocolat" (audio) on YouTube

"Luglio" was covered by Joe Dassin as "Le Petit Pain au chocolat" ("The Little Chocolate Bread"), with the lyrics adapted into French by Pierre Delanoë. Released as a single in 1968, the song reached no. 2 in Wallonia (French Belgium). It was the second track of side 1 of his 1969 album Joe Dassin (Les Champs-Élysées).

==== Track listing ====
7" single (CBS – 3871)

1. "Le Petit Pain au chocolat" (R. Del Turco, G. Bigazzi, P. Delanoë) – 3:30
2. "Le Temps des œufs au plat" (J. Dassin, R. Dassin, C. Lemesle) – 2:43

==== Charts ====
Chart (1968)	Peak position
Belgium (Ultratop 50 Wallonia)	2

=== Something's Happening ===
"Something's Happening"

Single by Herman's Hermits
- B-side: (UK) "The Most Beautiful Thing in My Life"; (US) "Little Miss Sorrow, Child of Tomorrow"
- Released: (UK) 29 November 1968 (US) December 1968
- Recorded: October 1968
- Studio: De Lane Lea Studios, London
- Genre: Pop rock
- Length: 3:07
- Label: (UK) Columbia (US) MGM
- Songwriters: Giancarlo Bigazzi; Riccardo Del Turco
- Lyricist: Jack Fishman
- Producer: Mickie Most

Herman's Hermits singles chronology
"The Most Beautiful Thing in My Life" (1968)	"Something's Happening" (1968)	"My Sentimental Friend" (1969)

"Something's Happening" is the English version of "Luglio", performed by Herman's Hermits on new lyrics by Jack Fishman. It was produced by Mickie Most and arranged by John Paul Jones.

=== Critical reception ===
Billboard described the song as a "catchy, clever number". Cash Box predicted that the song would be a hit with both young adults and teenagers, noting that it "should spur excitement among middle-of-the-road programmers right off with the teen channels coming in after the action has started".

==== Charts ====
Chart (1968)	Peak position
Australia (Kent Music Report)	25
Canada (The RPM 100)	84
New Zealand (Official New Zealand Music Chart)	20
Norway (VG-lista)	4
South Africa (Springbok Top 20)	3
UK (Record Retailer)	6
US Billboard Bubbling Under the Hot 100	130

=== Other covers ===
The song was also covered by The Tremeloes as "I'm Gonna Try", by Los Hermanos Rigual as "Julia" (in Spanish), and by Carmela Corren as "Heiß wie die Sonne" (in German).
