= Il était une fois nous deux =

Single by Joe Dassin

from the album Le Jardin du Luxembourg
- B-side: "Les aventuriers"
- Released: June 1976
- Genre: Chanson, pop
- Length: 3:55
- Label: CBS Disques
- Songwriters: Lyrics: Claude Lemesle; Pierre Delanoë
- Producer: Jacques Plait

Joe Dassin singles chronology
"Et si tu n'existais pas" / "Salut" (1976)	"Il était une fois nous deux" (1976)	"Le Jardin du Luxembourg" (1976)

Music video
- "Il était une fois nous deux" (Live) "Il était une fois nous deux" (audio) on YouTube

"Il était une fois nous deux" ("Once Upon a Time There Were We Two") is a song by Joe Dassin from his 1976 album Le Jardin du Luxembourg.

The song was based on the song "Monja Monja" written by Toto Cutugno and Vito Pallavicini and originally released by Cutugno's band Albatros. It was adapted into French by Claude Lemesle and Pierre Delanoë.

Released in 1976 as a single, in France it was number one on the singles sales chart for two consecutive weeks from June 17 to June 30, 1976.

== Track listing ==
7" single (CBS 4433)

1. "Il était une fois nous deux" (3:55)
2. "Les aventuriers" (2:40)

== Charts ==
Chart (1976)	Peak position
Belgium (Ultratop 50 Flanders)	23
France (IFOP)	1
