= La Fleur aux dents =

"La fleur aux dents"

Single by Joe Dassin

from the album Joe Dassin (La Fleur aux dents)
- A-side: "La fleur aux dents"
- B-side: "La Luzerne"
- Released: 1971
- Genre: Chanson, pop
- Length: 2:18
- Label: CBS Disques
- Songwriter(s): Claude Lemesle, Joe Dassin
- Producer(s): Jacques Plait

Joe Dassin singles chronology
"L'Amérique" / "Cécilia" (1970)	"La fleur aux dents" (1971)	"L'Équipe à Jojo" (1971)

Music video
- "La fleur aux dents" (audio); Joe Dassin and Dave "La fleur aux dents" (Live) on YouTube

"La fleur aux dents" is a song by Joe Dassin from his 1970 album Joe Dassin (La Fleur aux dents).

Released as a single, in France it was number one on the singles sales chart for seven consecutive weeks from January 28 to March 10, 1971.

== Track listing ==
7" single (CBS 5417)

1. "La fleur aux dents" (2:18)
2. "La Luzerne" (2:37)

== Charts ==
Chart (1971)	Peak position
France (IFOP)	1
