= À toi =

Single by Joe Dassin

from the album Le Jardin du Luxembourg
- A-side: "À toi"
- B-side: "Le Café des trois colombes"
- Released: 1977
- Recorded: October 1976
- Genre: Chanson, pop
- Length: 2:50
- Label: CBS Disques
- Songwriters: Lyrics: Claude Lemesle; Pierre Delanoë; Music: Jean Baudlot; Joe Dassin
- Producer: Jacques Plait

Joe Dassin singles chronology
"Le Jardin du Luxembourg" (1976)	"À toi" (1977)	"Et l'amour s'en va" (1977)

Music video
- "À toi" (audio) "A toi" (Live) on YouTube

"À toi" ("To You") is a song by Joe Dassin from his 1976 album Le Jardin du Luxembourg.

Released in 1977 as a single, in France it was number one on the singles sales chart for two consecutive weeks from February 18 to March 3, 1977.

== Track listing ==
45 rpm 7" vinyl (France, 1977)

No.	Title	Writer(s)	Length
1.	"À toi"	Claude Lemesle, Pierre Delanoë, Jean Baudlot, Joe Dassin	2:50
2.	"Le Café des trois colombes" ("In het kleine cafe aan de haven")	Claude Lemesle, Pierre Delanoë, Pierre Kartner	4:12

== Charts ==
Chart (1977–1978)	Peak position
Belgium (Ultratop 50 Flanders)	30
France (IFOP)	1
