= Taka takata =

1972 single by Paco Paco

Single by Paco Paco
- Language: Spanish
- B-side: "Olé España"
- Released: July 1972
- Label: Bellaphon
- Songwriter: Al Verlane

"Taka takata (La femme du Toréro)"

Single by Joe Dassin

from the album Joe
- Language: French
- B-side: "Le Cheval de fer"
- Released: October 1972
- Label: CBS Disques
- Songwriters: Al Verlane; French adaptation: Claude Lemesle, Richelle Dassin

Joe Dassin singles chronology
"Elle était Oh !" (1972)	"Taka takata (La femme du Toréro)" (1972)	"La Complainte de l'heure de pointe (À vélo dans Paris)" (1972)

"Taka takata" is a song originally recorded by Paco Paco, a Spanish singer living in Málaga, Spain. The song was released as a single in 1972 and was a hit in Europe.

In the same year the song was adapted into French under the title "Taka takata (La femme du Toréro)" by Claude Lemesle and Richelle Dassin. and recorded by Joe Dassin, who released it in 1972 on his album Joe and as a single.

== Background and writing ==
The original was written by Paco Paco (Francisco Ropero Gómez) and his father-in-law Belgian artist Al Verlane. The recording was produced by Biram.

== Commercial performance ==
The single "Taka takata" by Joe Dassin reached no. 1 in Finland (according to the chart, courtesy of Intro, that U.S. Billboard published in its "Hits of the World" section), at least no. 9 in Greece in the international singles chart (courtesy of Hellenikos Vorras and Epikera), and at least no. 4 in French Switzerland (chart courtesy of Radio Suisse Romande).

A version by Frederik reached at least the top 3 in Finland.

== Track listings ==
=== Paco Paco (original) version ===
7" single Bellaphon BL 18093

1. "Taka takata" (2:29)
2. "Olé España" (2:44)

=== Joe Dassin version ===
7" single CBS S 8121 (Germany, etc.)

1. "Taka takata (La femme du Toréro)" (2:41)
2. "Le cheval de fer" (2:35)

== Charts ==
"Taka takata" by Paco Paco

Chart (1972)	Peak position
Belgium (Ultratop 50 Flanders)	12
Netherlands (Single Top 100)	10

"Taka takata (La femme du Toréro)" by Joe Dassin

Chart (1972)	Peak position
West Germany (GfK)	50
