= The Beautiful Ballads =

Compilation album by Nat King Cole
- Released: 1967
- Length: 29:43
- Label: Capitol
- Producer: Lee Gillette

Nat King Cole chronology
The Unforgettable Nat King Cole Sings the Great Songs! (1966)	The Beautiful Ballads (1967)	Thank You Pretty Baby (1967)

The Beautiful Ballads is a 1967 posthumous album of recordings by Nat King Cole. The album was issued after the singer's death by Capitol Records collecting recordings which had not previously been available in LP form. Most of the tracks were previously released as single A-sides or B-sides.

== Track listing ==
1. "Felicia" (Ray Gilbert, Ulpio Minucci) - 2:15
2. "Miss Me" (Bob Marcus) - 2:20
3. "Marnie" - 2:40
4. "Here's To My Lady" (Rube Bloom, Johnny Mercer) - 3:00
5. "A Fool Was I" (Roy Alfred) - 2:49
6. "Bend A Little My Way" (Joel Sherman, Jack Wolf) - 2:25
7. "You'll See" (Eddie DeLange, Norman Gimbel) - 2:56 originally released as the B-side of "Wanderlust" in 1965
8. "If I Knew" (Meredith Willson) - 2:48
9. "Back In My Arms" (Johnny Mandel) - 3:02
10. "When It's Summer" (Johnny Burke, Nat "King" Cole) - 2:34
11. "I'll Always Be Remembering ("Things")" (Dok Stanford) - 2:54
