= Dans les yeux d'Émilie =

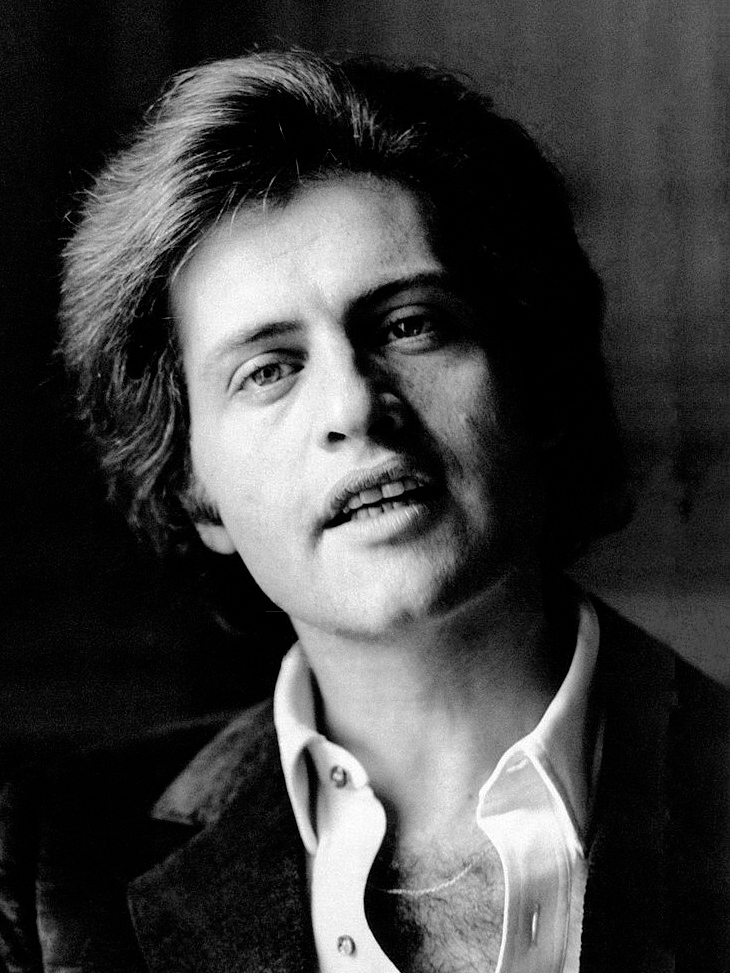
- Joe Dassin, the singer of Dans les yeux d'Émilie

Single by Joe Dassin

from the album Les Femmes de ma vie
- A-side: "Dans les yeux d'Émilie"; "Maria"
- Released: 1977
- Genre: Chanson, pop
- Length: 3:40
- Label: CBS Disques
- Songwriters: Pierre Delanoë / Claude Lemesle / Yvon Ouazana and Vivien Vallay
- Producer: Jacques Plait

Joe Dassin singles chronology
"Et l'amour s'en va" (1977)	"Dans les yeux d'Émilie" (1977)	"Maria" (1977)

Music video
- "Dans les yeux d'Émilie" (French TV, 1977) "Dans les yeux d'Émilie" (French TV, 1978) on YouTube

Dans les yeux d'Émilie is a song by Joe Dassin from his 1978 album Les Femmes de ma vie. It was also released as a single in 1977, with "Maria" on the other side.

== Writing and composition ==
The song was written by Pierre Delanoë and Claude Lemesle and composed by Yvon Ouazana and Vivien Vallay.

In this song Joe Dassin sings about winter in Quebec.

== 2015 EuroBasket ==
The song was the official song of the French basketball team at the 2015 European Basketball Championship (EuroBasket).

== Track listing ==
7" single CBS 5928

1. "Dans les yeux d'Émilie" (3:40)
2. "Maria" (4:40)

== Cover versions ==
- 2013: Bart Kaëll (in Dutch under the title "Zonneschijn")
- 2013: Hélène Ségara with Joe Dassin on the album Et si tu n'existais pas
- 2015: Joe Dassin, Les Choeurs de l'Armée Rouge (Joe Dassin with the Red Army Choir on the album Joe Dassin chante avec les Chœurs de l'Armée Rouge
