= Les Dalton (song) =

- 1967 French single cover

Single by Joe Dassin

from the album Les Deux Mondes de Joe Dassin
- Released: 1967
- Genre: Chanson, pop
- Length: 2:36
- Label: CBS Disques
- Songwriter(s): Franck Thomas, Joe Dassin. Jean-Michel Rivat
- Producer(s): Jacques Plait

Music video
- "Les Dalton" (audio) on YouTube

"Les Dalton" ("The Daltons") is a 1967 song by Joe Dassin. It was originally released as the first track of a 4-title EP on CBS.

The song is based on The Daltons, the characters from the comic strip series Lucky Luke. Dassin recorded it for CBS in London, accompanied by the Johnny Arthey band.

The song reached the top 10 in France.

== Track listing ==
7-inch EP (CBS EP 6356, 1975, 1967)

1. Les Dalton (2:36)
2. Hello Hello! (2:18)
3. Viens voir le loup (2:52)
4. C'est un cœur de papier (2:12)
