= Uno tranquillo =

1967 single by Riccardo Del Turco

Single by Riccardo Del Turco

from the album Riccardo Del Turco
- B-side: "Allora hai vinto tu"
- Released: 1967
- Genre: Pop
- Length: 3:10
- Label: CGD
- Songwriters: Daniele Pace; Lorenzo Pilat; Mario Panzeri

Riccardo Del Turco singles chronology
"Figlio unico" (1966)	"Uno tranquillo" (1967)	"L'importante è la rosa" (1967)

"Uno tranquillo" ("Quiet One") is a song by Italian singer Riccardo Del Turco, released as a single in 1967. The song is notable for being covered in English as "Suddenly You Love Me" by the Tremeloes and in French as "Siffler sur la colline" by Joe Dassin.

== Track listing ==
7”: CGD / N 9658

1. "Uno tranquillo" – 3:10
2. "Allora hai vinto tu" – 3:15

== The Tremeloes version ==
"Suddenly You Love Me"

Single by the Tremeloes

from the album Suddenly You Love Me
- A-side: "As You Are" (double A-side)
- Released: 12 January 1968
- Genre: Rock; beat; bubblegum pop
- Length: 2:45
- Label: CBS; Epic
- Songwriters: Daniele Pace; Mario Panzeri; Lorenzo Pilat; Peter Callander
- Producer: Mike Smith

The Tremeloes singles chronology
"Be Mine" (1967)	"Suddenly You Love Me" (1968)	"Helule Helule" (1968)

British band the Tremeloes released an English-language version of the song in January 1968. It became a top-ten hit in the UK and peaked at number 44 on the US Billboard Hot 100. It was an early example of British bubblegum pop.

=== Release ===
"Suddenly You Love Me" was released as a double A-sided single with "As You Are" in most countries. In the Netherlands and Germany, "As You Are" was promoted as the sole A-side and peaked at number 35 on the German Singles Chart. In the US and Canada, "Suddenly You Love Me" was released two weeks later than the UK, with the flip side "Suddenly Winter", which was the B-side to the band's previous single "Be Mine". In New Zealand, "Suddenly You Love Me" was released with the B-side "Negotiations in Soho Square", taken from the album Alan, Dave, Rick and Chip.

=== Reception ===
Reviewing for New Musical Express, Derek Johnson wrote that "Suddenly You Love Me" "exudes a wonderfully lighthearted atmosphere, with organ, rattling tambourine and handclaps providing a sizzling backcloth to the boys' spirited vocal". Whilst "As You Are" was described as being "much slower", "a rhythmic ballad with a descriptive lyric".

Billboard described is as "one of [the Tremeloes] most powerful entries to date" and as an "infectious and rhythmic rocker that should quickly surpass their "Even the Bad Times Are Good" and bring them back to the "Silence Is Golden" selling class". Cash Box wrote that "Happy bounce and a terrific up-tempo side done with mirthful group vocals and a soiid orchestral drive make it possibly the brightest side by the Tremeloes in a long while".

In a retrospective article, Robin Carmody of Freaky Trigger praised the song's "grinning rush" and grouped it among other early British bubblegum songs, like the Love Affair's "Everlasting Love" (1967) and the Casuals' "Jesamine" (1968), for their emerging sense of optimism, "not in a cloying or false way, but appealingly (and unreachably) pre-ironic."

The song's intro was sampled in Gabi Shoshan's song, "Lehishtatot Lifamim".

=== Track listing ===
7": CBS / 3234

1. "Suddenly You Love Me" – 2:45
2. "As You Are" – 2:45

7": CBS / BA-461174 (New Zealand)

1. "Suddenly You Love Me" – 2:45
2. "Negotiations in Soho Square" – 3:01

7": Epic / 5-10293 (US and Canada)

1. "Suddenly You Love Me" – 2:45
2. "Suddenly Winter" – 2:26

=== Charts ===
Chart (1968)	Peak position
Australia (Go-Set)	24
Australia (Kent Music Report)	20
Belgium (Ultratop 50 Wallonia)	43
Canada Top Singles (RPM)	9
Canada (CHUM)	7
Finland (Suomen virallinen lista)	18
Ireland (IRMA)	9
New Zealand (Listener)	6
Rhodesia (Lyons Maid)	7
Spain (Promusicae)	8
Sweden (Kvällstoppen)	7
Sweden (Tio i Topp)	1
UK Melody Maker Top 30	5
UK New Musical Express Top 30	6
UK Record Retailer Top 50	6
US Billboard Hot 100	44
US Cash Box Top 100	40

== Joe Dassin version ==
"Siffler sur la colline"

Single by Joe Dassin

from the album Joe Dassin (Les Champs-Élysées)
- B-side: "Comment te dire"
- Released: March 1968
- Genre: Chanson; pop
- Length: 2:32
- Label: CBS
- Songwriters: Daniele Pace; Mario Panzeri; Lorenzo Pilat; Jean-Michel Rivat; Frank Thomas
- Producer: Jacques Plait

Joe Dassin singles chronology
"La Bande à Bonnot" (1968)	"Siffler sur la colline" (1968)	"Ma bonne étoile" (1968)

Music video
- "Siffler sur la colline" (audio) on YouTube

American singer-songwriter Joe Dassin released a French-language version of the song as a single in March 1968 from his album Joe Dassin (Les Champs-Élysées). It was adapted into French by Jean-Michel Rivat and Frank Thomas and featured an orchestra conducted by Johnny Arthey.

=== Track listing ===
7": CBS / 3368

1. "Siffler sur la colline" – 2:32
2. "Comment te dire" – 2:55

=== Charts ===
Chart (1968)	Peak position
Belgium (Ultratop 50 Wallonia)	2
France (IFOP)	2

== Other versions ==
- In 1967, Dutch singer Ben Cramer released a Dutch-language version, titled "Zai zai zai", as his debut single, which peaked at number 12 on the Dutch Single Top 100 and number 7 on the Dutch Top 40.
- In 1968, Finnish singer Tapani Kansa released a Finnish-language version, titled "Päättyneet on päivät", as a single coupled with a cover of "Delilah". The single topped the Finnish Singles Chart.
- In 1968, Yugoslav band Crni Biseri released a Serbo-Croatian-language version, entitled "Nisam više taj". Their version became a nationwide hit in Yugoslavia, spending several weeks on the top of the charts in radio shows Minimaks and Sastanak u devet i pet.
- In 1968, Peruvian band Los Doltons released a Spanish-language version of the song titled "De repente tú me amas." This version was also performed by other Spanish-speaking artists.
- In 1968, Greek band The Idols released a Greek-language version of the song titled "Ξαφνικά Μ'Αγαπάς".
- In 1994, Belgian band Championettes released a Dutch-language version, titled "Elke keer opnieuw", as a single, which peaked at number 13 on the Ultratop 50 Flanders.
