= La Complainte de l'heure de pointe =

"La complainte de l'heure de pointe"

Single by Joe Dassin

from the album Joe
- A-side: "La complainte de l'heure de pointe (À vélo dans Paris)"
- B-side: "Un peu de paradis"
- Released: 1973
- Genre: Chanson, pop
- Length: 2:00
- Label: CBS Disques
- Songwriters: Chris Juwens, Leon Deane French lyrics: Richelle Dassin; Claude Lemesle
- Producer: Jacques Plait

Joe Dassin singles chronology
"Taka takata (La Femme du toréro)" (1972)	"La complainte de l'heure de pointe" (1973)	"S'aimer sous la pluie" (1973)

"La complainte de l'heure de pointe (À vélo dans Paris)" is a song by Joe Dassin from his 1972 album Joe.

The song was based on the song "La Di Li La Di Lo" written by Chris Juwens and Leon Deane and originally released by Jeremias. It was adapted into French by Richelle Dassin et Claude Lemesle.

Released in 1973 as a single, in France it was number one on the singles sales chart for one week from February 12 to 18, 1973.

== Track listing ==
7" single (CBS 1109)

1. "La complainte de l'heure de pointe (À vélo dans Paris)" (2:00)
2. "Un peu de paradis" (2:18)

== Charts ==
Chart (1973)	Peak position
Belgium (Ultratop 50 Wallonia)	8
France (IFOP)	1
