= L'Été indien =

Single by Joe Dassin

from the album Joe Dassin (Si tu t'appelles Mélancolie) (1975 version)
- Released: May 24, 1975
- Genre: Pop
- Length: 4:30
- Label: CBS
- Songwriters: Toto Cutugno, Graham Stuart Johnson, Pasquale Losito, Vito Pallavicini
- Producer: Jacques Plait

Joe Dassin singles chronology
"Si tu t'appelles Mélancolie" / "Vade retro" (1974)	"L'Été indien" (1975)	"Ça va pas changer le monde" (1975)

Music video
- "L'Été indien" (2010 video) on YouTube

Live video
- "L'Été indien" (French TV, 1975) on YouTube

"L'Été indien" (French, 'Indian summer') is a 1975 single by American singer Joe Dassin. In the song he reflects with fond memories of his lover, whom he met during an indian summer, but with whom he has now lost contact.

== Background ==
The song was based on the song "Africa" by Toto Cutugno, Vito Pallavicini, Pasquale Losito, and Sam Ward (originally released by Toto Cutugno's band Albatros), hence the subtitle ["L'Été indien (Africa)"] on some single releases. It was adapted into French by Claude Lemesle and Pierre Delanoë, arranged by Johnny Arthey and produced by Jacques Plait. "L'Été indien" went on to become Dassin's biggest hit, selling almost 2 million copies worldwide.

== Track listing ==
- 7" Single
1. "L'Été indien (Africa)" – 4:30
2. "Moi j'ai dit non" – 2:20

== Usages in rhythmic gymnastics ==
- In 2010 Israeli gymnast Neta Rivkin used the tune for her ribbon routine.
- In 2011 Russian gymnast Yevgeniya Kanayeva designed her hoop routine with this music in preparation for the World Championships to be held at Montpellier, France.

== Cover versions ==
- French actor and comedian Guy Bedos performed a parody of the song, entitled "Le Tube de l'Hiver".
- Polish dance singer Mandaryna recorded a cover of the song for her debut album Mandaryna.com in 2004, and released it as her second single.
- Nancy Sinatra and Lee Hazlewood released an English language cover of the song as a single in 1976. A previously unreleased extended version was included on Sinatra's 2009 digital only collection, Cherry Smiles - The Rare Singles. A remastered version of the original single edit was released digitally on October 21, 2020 as the first single from Sinatra's Start Walkin' 1965-1976. Another version without Sinatra also appeared on the 1976 Hazlewood album 20th Century Lee.
- German music-producer Frank Farian (sang under a pseudonym "Exodus", produced under pseudonym "Monfa") recorded a slightly different and longer cover in English of the song as a single in 1975, his cover-version served as the exact basis for the Finnish language cover named "Kuusamo" recorded by Finnish artist Danny.
- Hungarian singer Kati Kovács recorded a cover of the song on her ninth album, Csendszóró (Silentophone) in 1977, entitled "Indián nyár".
- Slovak actor and singer Michal Dočolomanský recorded a cover of the song, entitled "Ľúbim Ťa" (means 'I love You'), together with a vocal group Bezinky, on the SP in 1977.
- A German Version exists by Peter Alexander ("Liebe kommt so wie ein bunter Schmetterling")
- A Spanish Version "Africa" exists by Dassin
- Another French version exists by singer Ysa Ferrer
- A Hungarian version "Indián nyár" exists by Kati Kovács, lyrics Iván Bradányi
- A Finnish version "Kuusamo" exists by Danny, lyrics Juha Vainio
- A Greek version "Όνειρα" ("Dreams") exists, by Dakis and later Teris Chrisos, lyrics by Sasa Maneta.
- A Hebrew version "אלי את לי פריז" exists by Shai Hamber.
- A version in the style of Peruvian cumbia (also known as "chicha") called "Indian Summer" exists by Brooklyn-based band Chicha Libre
- A Russian Version "Где же ты" (Where are you) by Valery Obodzinsky exists.

== Commercial performance ==
Dassin's version reached no. 1 on the French singles sales chart compiled by the Centre d'Information et de Documentation du Disque in 1975.

== Charts ==
=== Weekly charts ===
Chart (1975)	Peak position
Argentina (Billboard)	10
Belgium (Ultratop 50 Flanders)	4
Belgium (Ultratop 50 Wallonia)	1
Finland (Suomen virallinen lista)	4
France (CIDD)	1
Israel (IBA)	1
Netherlands (Dutch Top 40)	22
Netherlands (Single Top 100)	12
Quebec (Palmarès francophone)	1
Spain (El Gran Musical)	12
Switzerland (Schweizer Hitparade)	5
Turkey (Billboard)	11
West Germany (GfK)	47
Yugoslavia (Billboard)	8

Chart (1989)	Peak position
France (SNEP)	35

=== Monthly charts ===
Monthly chart performance for "L'Été indien"
Chart (1977)	Peak position
Soviet Union International Songs (MK)	1

=== Year-end charts ===
Chart (1975)	Position
Belgium (Ultratop Flanders)	17
France (SNEPA)	2
Switzerland (Schweizer Hitparade)	20
