= Les Champs-Élysées (song) =

1969 single by Joe Dassin

"Les Champs-Elysées"

Single by Joe Dassin

from the album Joe Dassin (Les Champs-Élysées)
- Language: French
- B-side: "Le Chemin de papa"
- Released: 11 May 1969
- Length: 2:40
- Label: CBS
- Songwriters: Pierre Delanoë, Michael Wilshaw, Michael Deighan
- Producer: Jacques Plait

Joe Dassin singles chronology
"Me que me que" (1969)	"Les Champs-Elysées" (1969)	"C'est la vie, Lily" (1970)

Music video
- "Les Champs-Elysées" on YouTube

Audio
- "Les Champs-Elysées" on YouTube

Live video
- "Les Champs-Elysées" (French TV, 1969) on YouTube

"Waterloo Road"
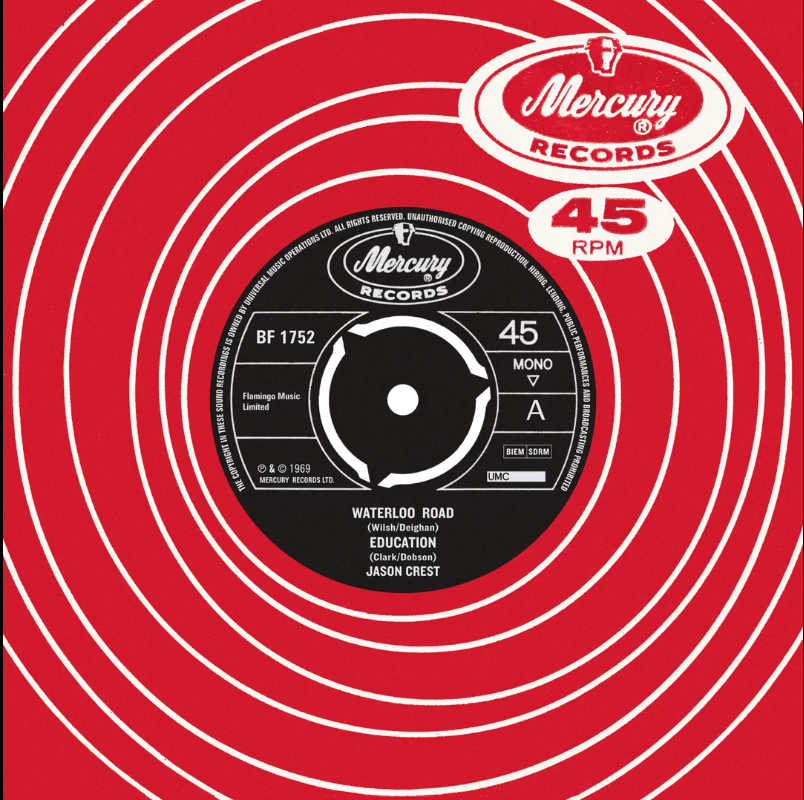
- Digital reissue cover

Single by Jason Crest
- B-side: "Education"
- Released: 28 February 1968
- Label: Phillips
- Songwriters: Michael Anthony Deighan, Michael Wilshaw

Jason Crest singles chronology
"Here We Go Round (The Lemon Tree)" (1967)	"Waterloo Road" (1968)	"Place in the Sun" (1969)

Audio
- "Waterloo Road" on YouTube

"Les Champs-Élysées" is a 1969 song by the American singer Joe Dassin. It is a French-language cover of "Waterloo Road", a single released the previous year by the English rock band Jason Crest.

== Composition ==
"Les Champs-Élysées" is based on the English-language song "Waterloo Road", written by Michael Antony Deighan and Mike Wilsh, and released by English rock band Jason Crest in 1968. For Dassin's version of the song, Pierre Delanoë adapted the lyrics into French, and Jean Musy arranged the song.

== Release and reception ==
"Les Champs-Élysées" was released by CBS Records as a 7" single in 1969, with "Le Chemin de papa" as the B-side. The single was also included on Dassin's 1969 studio album Joe Dassin (Les Champs-Élysées). Dassin later recorded versions of the song in English, German, Italian and Japanese.

While Jason Crest's "Waterloo Road" had been unsuccessful, Dassin's "Les Champs-Élysées" was a success in multiple European countries, selling 600,000 copies in France. The song also earned Dassin the 1969 Grand Prix du Disque from the Académie Charles-Cros.

== Music video ==
An animated music video for "Les Champs-Élysées" was released on YouTube on 15 June 2024 and was also premiered at the 2024 Annecy International Animation Film Festival. The music video was directed by Florent Grattery and with animation created with Caribara Animation.

== Track listing ==
7" single (CBS 4281)

1. "Les Champs-Élysées" (2:40)
2. "Le chemin de papa" (2:22)

== Charts ==
Chart (1969)	Peak position
Belgium (Ultratop 50 Wallonia)	4
France (CIDD)	10
Netherlands (Dutch Top 40)	11
Netherlands (Single Top 100)	16
Switzerland (Schweizer Hitparade)	5
West Germany (GfK)	31

== Other versions ==
In 1969, Yugoslav singer Majda Sepe recorded a Slovenian language version, titled "Šuštarski most" ("Shoemakers Bridge", referring to Ljubljana's Shoemakers Bridge). In 1983, Yugoslav avant-garde rock band Buldožer recorded a cover, entitled "Garçon De Yougoslavie", featuring actress Mira Furlan on vocals. In 1986, Yugoslav pop rock band Poslednja Igra Leptira recorded a Serbo-Croatian cover entitled "Šanzelize" (transliteration for "Champs-Élysées").

A Dutch version of the song, Oh, Waterlooplein, was released by Johnny Kraaijkamp and Rijk de Gooyer in 1969.

The song was covered by the American punk band NOFX on their 1997 album So Long and Thanks for All the Shoes.

In 2018, the song was remade by Paul Pogba and Benjamin Mendy to honor Chelsea and French star N'Golo Kante, known as "he is small, he is kind, he stopped Leo Messi". The adaptation achieved great popularity in France during the French team's title run in the 2018 FIFA World Cup, and also among Kante's teammates. The song was later reused in 2026 FIFA World Cup to honor Michael Olise due to coincidentally similar sounding of Olise’s name with the song.

A Hebrew parody version of the song, titled Oh, Ibn Gvirol, and referring to Tel Aviv's Ibn Gabirol Street was released by Uri Falk and Ariel Zilber in 2024.

== In popular culture ==
The entire song plays under the closing credits of Wes Anderson's film The Darjeeling Limited (2007).

The melody of Les Champs-Élysées was later used for the television commercial of CJ CheilJedang's dessert brand Petitzel Eclair in 2016, with lyrics sung by I.O.I.

The refrain of the song, accompanied by a yellow bouncing ball over the lyrics, was played during breaks in NBCSN's coverage of the 2018 Tour de France.

The song is performed in the ninth episode (titled "Evil Patrol") of the third season of the DC Comics television show Doom Patrol in 2021 by Riley Shanahan (Ultimax the Brain) and Jonathan Lipow (Monsieur Mallah).

Les Champs-Élysées was also played in the Ariake Arena at the 2020 Summer Olympics in Tokyo after the upcoming host nation France beat the Russian Olympic Committee in the gold medal game. The song, accompanied by a yellow bouncing ball over the lyrics, was played during breaks in events held at the Stade de France during the 2024 Summer Olympics in Paris. The song was also played during the closing ceremony as well. During the opening ceremony of the 2024 Summer Paralympics at the Place de la Concorde, the song was also played as the host nation, France, was introduced in the Parade of Nations.

A cover version by Pomplamoose was used in an Airbnb commercial campaign in 2024.
