= Pierre Delanoë =

French lyricist (1918–2006)

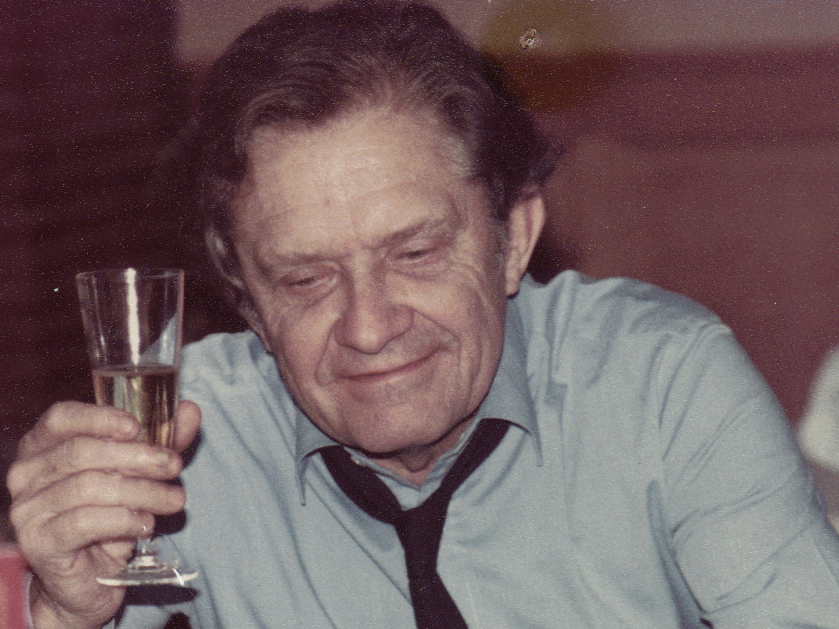
- Delanoë in 1982

Background information
- Born: Pierre Charles Marcel Napoléon Leroyer; 16 December 1918; Paris, France
- Died: 27 December 2006 (aged 88) Poissy, France
- Genre: Chanson
- Occupations: Civil servant; songwriter; author
- Years active: 1945–2006
- Website: pierre-delanoe.fr

Pierre Charles Marcel Napoléon Leroyer (16 December 1918 – 27 December 2006), known professionally as Pierre Delanoë (French pronunciation: [pjɛʁ dəlanɔe]), was a French lyricist who wrote thousands of songs for dozens of singers, including Dalida, Edith Piaf, Charles Aznavour, Petula Clark, Johnny Hallyday, Joe Dassin, Michel Sardou and Mireille Mathieu.

== Career ==
Pierre Leroyer was born in Paris. For his professional career, he adopted his grandmother's maiden name Delanoë. After obtaining a law degree, he began a career as a tax collector, and later a tax inspector. After World War II, he met Gilbert Bécaud and began working as a lyricist. For a period, he even performed alongside Bécaud in clubs. They penned some of France's best loved songs, including "Et maintenant", translated into English as "What Now My Love", which was covered by artists including Agnetha Fältskog, Elvis Presley, Frank Sinatra, Barbra Streisand, the Supremes, Sonny & Cher, Herb Alpert & the Tijuana Brass and the Temptations. "Je t'appartiens" ("Let It Be Me") was covered by the Everly Brothers, Tom Jones, Bob Dylan, Willie Nelson, Nina Simone and Nofx. "Crois-moi ça durera" was covered as "You'll See" by Nat King Cole.

In addition to Bécaud, Delanoë wrote for Édith Piaf ("La Goualante du pauvre Jean"), Tino Rossi, Hugues Aufray, Michel Fugain ("Je n'aurai pas le temps", "Une belle histoire"), Nicoletta, Nana Mouskouri, Michel Polnareff, Gérard Lenorman ("La Ballade des gens heureux"), Joe Dassin ("L'Été indien", "Les Champs-Élysées", "Et si tu n'existais pas"), Nicole Rieu ("Et bonjour à toi l'artiste") and Michel Sardou ("Les Vieux Mariés", "Le France"). He wrote a passionate song about Joan of Arc in "La demoiselle d'Orléans" for Mireille Mathieu. The final lyric: "When I think of all I have given France... and she has forgotten me" was truly how the singer felt as she was made a caricature by Communists.

The song "Dors, mon amour", performed by André Claveau, for which Delanoë only wrote the music, and went on to win the Eurovision Song Contest 1958.

In 1955, Delanoë was involved as Director of Programs in the launch of Europe 1, the first French radio station to program popular music in a modern way.

He served as President of SACEM in 1984 and 1986, then from 1988 to 1990, and again from 1992 to 1994. He was awarded the Poets Grand Prize in 1997 by the institution.

On 31 March 2004, Delanoë was given France's highest culture award, Commandeur of the Ordre des Arts et des Lettres.

He created some controversy in July 2006 after expressing dislike for rap music, saying that it is "a form of expression for people incapable of making music" and "not music but vociferations, eructations (belching)".

== Death ==
Delanoë died of cardiac arrest in the early morning of 27 December 2006, at the age of 88 in Poissy near Paris. He is buried in the Cimetière de Fourqueux, which is just southeast of Poissy. His wife Micheline Leroyer (née Biesel) died on 16 January 2015, aged 97, and is buried beside him. They had three children: Pierre-Denis, Sylvie and Caroline.

== Bibliography ==
- Pierre Delanoë, La vie en chantant, éditions René Julliard, 1980
- Pierre Delanoë, Le surnuméraire, éditions René Julliard, 1982
- Pierre Delanoë, Le 19è trou, éditions Robert Laffont, 1984
- Pierre Delanoë, en collaboration avec A. J. Lafaurie et Philippe Letellier, Golfantasmes, éditions Albin Michel, 1986
- Pierre Delanoë, La retraite aux flambeaux, éditions Robert Laffont, 1986
- Pierre Delanoë, Poésies et chansons, éditions Seghers, 1986
- Pierre Delanoë, Et à part ça qu'est-ce que vous faites ?, éditions Michel Lafon, 1987
- Pierre Delanoë, Comment écrire une chanson, éditions Paul Beuscher, 1987
- Pierre Delanoë, avant-propos de Jean-Marc Natel, Paroles à lire, poèmes à chanter, éditions Le Cherche Midi, 1990
- Pierre Delanoë, entretiens avec Alain-Gilles Minella, La chanson en colère, éditions Mame, 1993
- Pierre Delanoë, illustrations de Barberousse, Les comptines de Titine, éditions Hemma Éditions, 1995
- Pierre Delanoë, illustrations de Barberousse, Les comptines d'Eglantine, éditions Hemma Éditions, 1995
- Pierre Delanoë, préface de Jean-Marc Natel, voix de Charles Aznavour à Jean-Claude Brialy en passant par Renaud, Anthologie de la poésie française de Charles d'Orléans à Charles Trenet, éditions du Layeur, 1997
- Pierre Delanoë, en collaboration avec Alain Poulanges, préface de Gilbert Bécaud, La vie en rose, éditions Plume, 1997
- Pierre Delanoë, illustrations de Barberousse, musique Gérard Calvi, interprètes Jacques Haurogné, Juliette, Fabienne Guyon, Pierre Delanoë, Xavier Lacouture et Catherine Estourelle, La comptine à Titine, éditions Hemma Éditions, 1998
- Pierre Delanoë, préface de Michel Tournier de l'Académie Goncourt, Des paroles qui chantent, éditions Christian Pirot, 1999
- Pierre Delanoë, préface de Gilbert Bécaud, Le témoin était aveugle, éditions Les vents contraires, 2000
- Pierre Delanoë, préface de Jean-Marc Natel, narration de Brigitte Lahaie, musique de Guy Boyer, La poésie dans le boudoir, éditions du Layeur, 2000
- Pierre Delanoë, préface de Jean Orizet, D'humeur et d'humour, éditions Mélis éditions, 2002
- Pierre Delanoë, Tous des putes, éditions Mélis éditions, 2002
- Pierre Delanoë, en collaboration avec Jean Beaulne, Pierre Delanoë…Et maintenant, éditions City Éditions, 2004
