= Joe Dassin =

American musician (1938–1980)

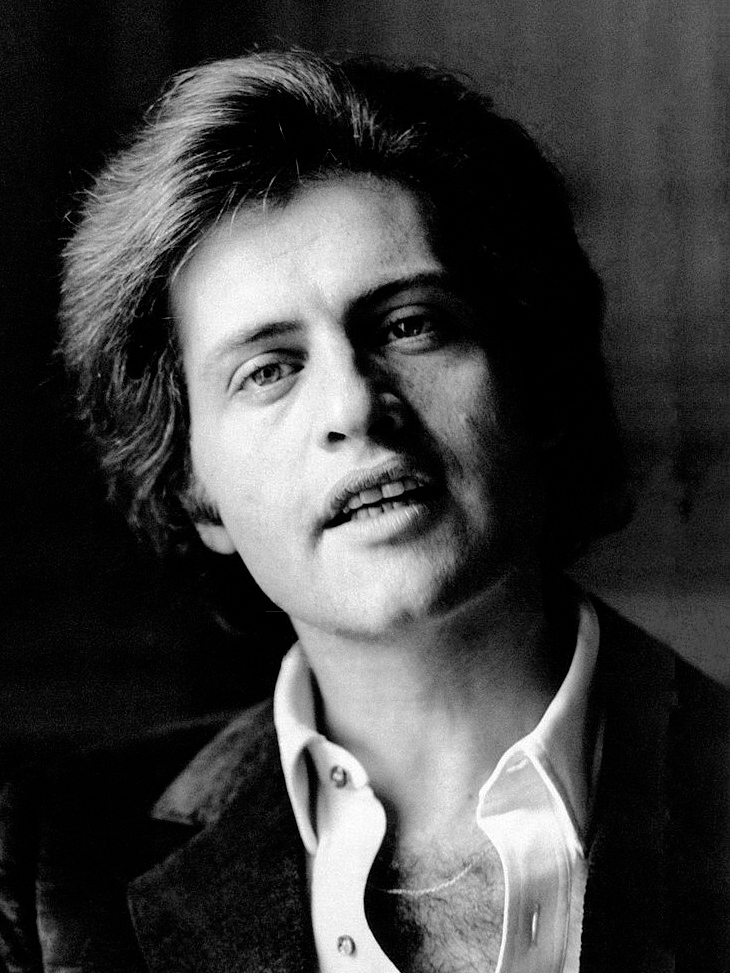
- Dassin c. 1970
- Born: Joseph Ira Dassin; November 5, 1938; New York City, U.S.
- Died: August 20, 1980 (aged 41); Papeete, Tahiti, French Polynesia
- Occupations: Musician; songwriter
- Years active: 1958–1980
- Spouses: Maryse Massiéra (m. 1966; div. 1977); Christine Delvaux (m. 1978)
- Children: 3
- Father: Jules Dassin
- Relatives: Melina Mercouri (stepmother); Stamatis Merkouris (step-grandfather)
- Musical career
- Genres: Chanson; French pop
- Instruments: Vocals; guitar; piano
- Labels: Columbia; RCA; CBS
- Website: joedassin.fr

Joseph Ira Dassin (November 5, 1938 – August 20, 1980) was an American singer-songwriter. He sang in multiple languages but found his greatest successes in France and the French-speaking world. In total, he sold nearly 25 million records worldwide.

== Early life ==
Dassin was born in Brooklyn, New York City, to Jewish-American parents. His father was film director Jules Dassin and his mother was violinist Béatrice Launer, who studied at the Juilliard School. Both of his parents were mostly of Ukrainian-Jewish descent from Kamianets-Podilskyi, Sataniv and Buchach.

Dassin lived in New York City and Los Angeles until his father was placed on the Hollywood blacklist in 1950, at which time his family moved to Europe. Between the ages of ten and fifteen Dassin changed schools eleven times. Dassin returned to the United States to attend the University of Michigan, where he won a Hopwood Award for fiction in 1958. Dassin earned a bachelor's degree in 1961 and a Master of Arts degree in 1963.

== Career ==
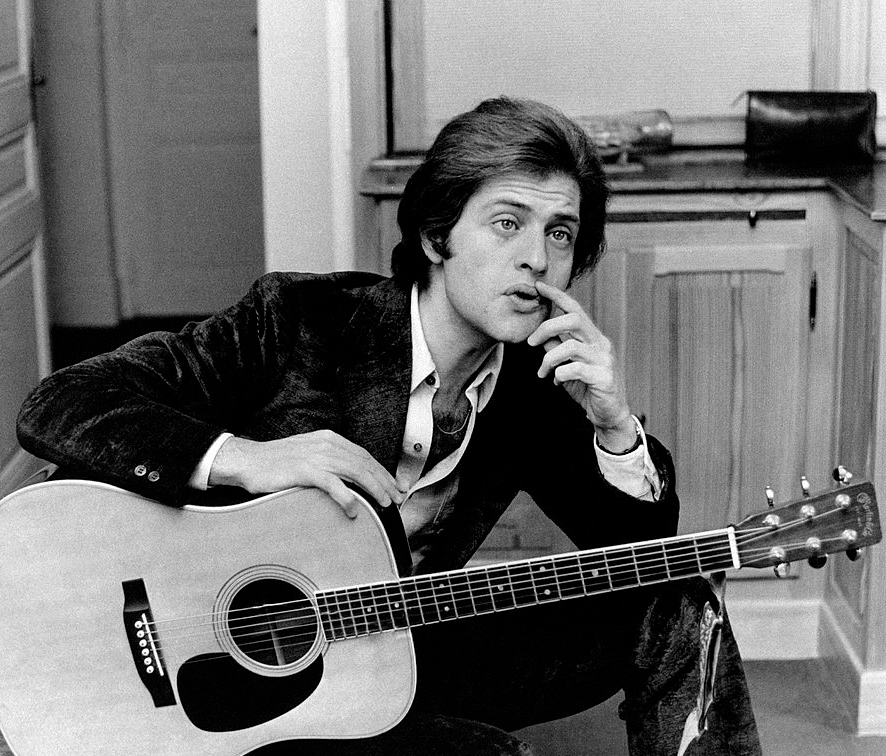
Dassin in the 1960s

Moving to France, Dassin worked as a technician for his father and appeared as an actor in supporting roles, among others in three movies directed by his father, including Topkapi (1964) in which he played the role of Josef. He met his future wife Maryse Massiéra in Paris in 1963.

On December 26, 1964, Dassin signed with CBS Records, making him the first French-language singer to be signed with an American record label.

By the early 1970s, Dassin's songs were at the top of the charts in France, and he became immensely popular there. He recorded songs in German, Spanish, Italian, and Greek, as well as French and English. Amongst his most popular songs are "Les Champs-Élysées" (Originally "Waterloo Road") (1969), "Salut les amoureux" (originally "City of New Orleans") (1973), "L'Été indien" (1975), "Et si tu n'existais pas" (1975), and "À toi" (1976).

== Personal life ==
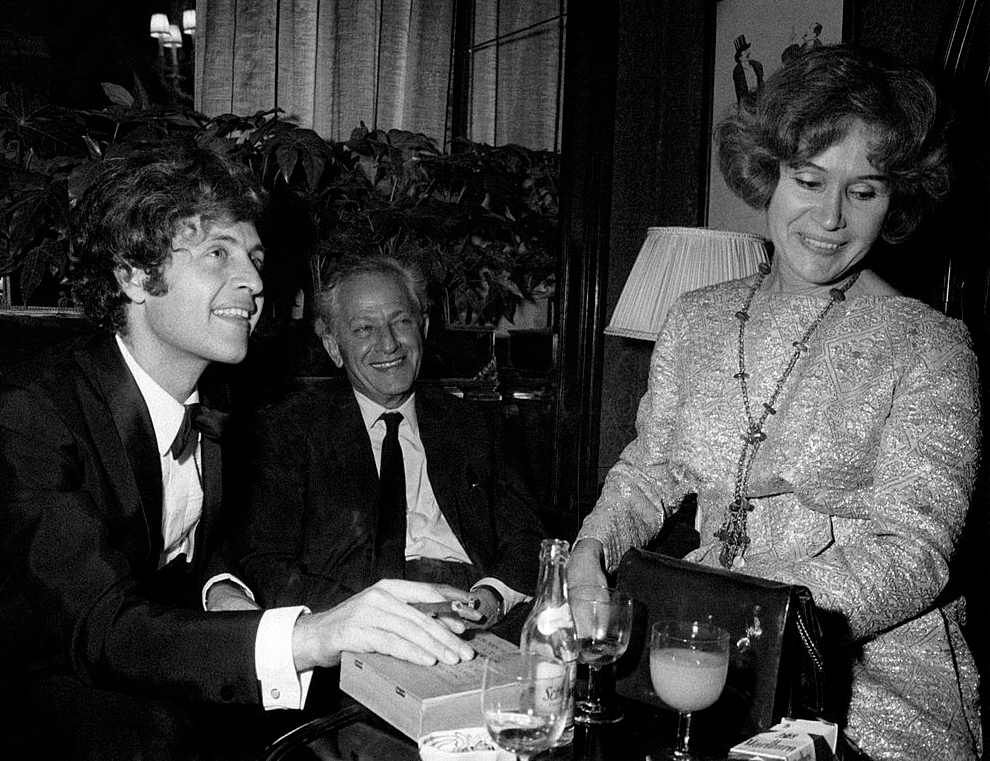
Dassin with his parents, Jules Dassin and Béatrice Launer, in Paris in 1970

While Dassin is sometimes described as being French, his son Julien said: "He was an American living in France. He didn't have French citizenship. But he often said, 'I'm American on paper but French at heart.'"

Dassin married Maryse Massiéra in Paris on January 18, 1966. Their son Joshua was born two and a half months early on September 12, 1973, and died five days later. They divorced in 1977. On January 14, 1978, Dassin married Christine Delvaux in Cotignac, and they had two sons together. Christine died in December 1995.

== Death ==
Dassin's grave at Hollywood Forever Cemetery in Los Angeles

Dassin died from a heart attack during a vacation to Tahiti on August 20, 1980, aged 41. He was eating lunch with family and friends at the restaurant Chez Michel et Éliane in Papeete when he suddenly slumped in his chair, unconscious. A doctor who was also eating at the restaurant performed CPR on him, but Dassin died at the restaurant. The only ambulance in Papeete was unavailable at the time and took 40 minutes to arrive. His body was returned to the United States and is interred in the Beth Olam section of Hollywood Forever Cemetery in Hollywood, California.

== Tributes ==
In 2020, many established artists paid tribute to Dassin songs on a tribute album, À toi, Joe Dassin. The album peaked at No. 44 in the French SNEP Albums chart. It also charted in Belgium peaking at No. 26 in the country's Ultratop albums francophone chart and also peaking at No. 4 in the Swiss Hitparade (Albums Chart). Artists appearing on the album included Ycare, Axelle Red, Les Frangines, Trois Cafés Gourmands, Patrick Fiori, Kids United Nouvelle Génération, Madame Monsieur, and Camélia Jordana.

== Discography ==
=== Studio albums ===
- Joe Dassin à New York (1966)
- Les Deux Mondes de Joe Dassin (1967)
- Joe Dassin (Les Champs-Élysées) (1969)
- Joe Dassin (La Fleur aux dents) (1970)
- Joe Dassin (Elle était... Oh!) (1971)
- Joe (1972)
- 13 chansons nouvelles (1973)
- Joe Dassin (Si tu t'appelles Mélancolie) (1974)
- Joe Dassin (Le Costume blanc) (1975)
- Le Jardin du Luxembourg (1976)
- Les Femmes de ma vie (1978)
- 15 ans déjà... (1978)
- Blue Country (1979)

=== Foreign-language studio albums ===
- Ich Hab' Mich Verliebt (1972; in German)
- En Los Jardines De Mi Ciudad (1976; in Spanish)
- Las Mujeres De Mi Vida (1978; in Spanish)
- Люксембургский Сад (1979; in Russian)
- Home Made Ice Cream (1979; in English)
