= Nostalgia canaglia =

Single by Al Bano and Romina Power

from the album Sempre sempre
- Language: Italian
- B-side: "Caro amore"
- Released: February 1987
- Recorded: 1986–87
- Genre: Pop ballad
- Length: 3:25
- Label: WEA
- Composers: Albano Carrisi; Romina Power; Vito Mercurio
- Lyricists: Vito Pallavicini; Willy Molco
- Producer: Anthony Monn

Al Bano and Romina Power singles chronology
"Sempre sempre" (1986)	"Nostalgia canaglia" (1987)	"Libertà!" (1987)

Music video
- "Nostalgia canaglia" (audio) on YouTube

"Nostalgia canaglia" (Italian pronunciation: [nostalˈdʒiːa kaˈnaʎʎa]; "Rogue Nostalgia") is a 1987 song by Italian–American duo Al Bano and Romina Power, released via the label WEA as a single from their album Sempre sempre. The music was composed by the singers alongside Vito Mercurio, and the lyrics were written by Vito Pallavicini and Willy Molco.

Al Bano and Romina competed with the song in the Sanremo Music Festival 1987, returning to the contest three years after their 1984 victory with "Ci sarà". "Nostalgia canaglia" placed third behind winning song "Si può dare di più" (by Gianni Morandi, Enrico Ruggeri and Umberto Tozzi) and runner-up "Figli" (by Toto Cutugno). The single peaked at number 4 on the Italian charts and went on to become one of the duo's most popular tracks.

== Track listing ==
7" single – Europe (WEA 248 452-7, 1987)

1. "Nostalgia canaglia" (Albano Carrisi, Romina Power, Vito Mercurio, Vito Pallavicini, Willy Molco) – 3:25
2. "Caro amore" (Albano Carrisi, Vito Pallavicini, Willy Molco) – 4:07

== Charts ==
Weekly chart performance for "Nostalgia canaglia"
Chart (1987)	Peak position
Italy (Musica e dischi)	4

== Sources ==
- Anselmi, Eddy (2009). Festival di Sanremo: Almanacco illustrato della canzone italiana (in Italian). Modena: Panini.
