= Romina Power =

American singer and actress (born 1951)

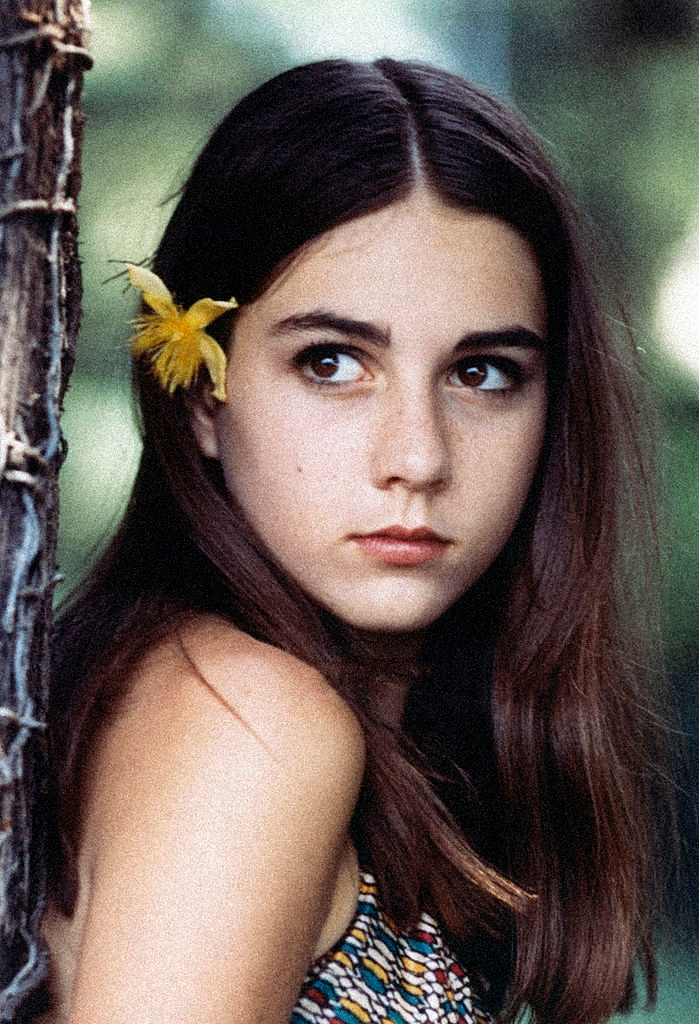
- Romina Power in the movie Las trompetas del apocalipsis (1969)
- Born: Romina Francesca Power; October 2, 1951 (age 74); Los Angeles, California, U.S.
- Occupations: Actress; singer
- Years active: 1964–present
- Spouse: Albano Carrisi (m. 1970; div. 2012)
- Children: 4, including Ylenia Carrisi
- Parent(s): Tyrone Power; Linda Christian
- Relatives: Taryn Power (sister); Tyrone Power Jr. (half-brother); Ariadna Welter (maternal aunt); Tyrone Power Sr. (grandfather); Tyrone Power (great-great-grandfather)
- Website: www.rominapower.guru

Romina Francesca Power (born October 2, 1951) is an American actress and singer. She is the daughter of actor Tyrone Power and actress Linda Christian. With her then-husband, Albano Carrisi, she formed the music duo Al Bano & Romina Power, which gained popularity in many parts of the world during the 1980s.

== Biography ==
=== Childhood ===
Power is the eldest daughter of American screen idol Tyrone Power and his second wife, Mexican actress Linda Christian. She was named after Rome, where her parents had fallen in love; her middle name is in reference to the church of Santa Francesca Romana, the site of their wedding ceremony.

Initially, she grew up in the Bel Air neighborhood of Los Angeles. After her parents divorced in 1956, Power and her younger sister Taryn were sent to live with their maternal grandmother in Mexico. They went to live briefly with their mother and her new husband, Edmund Purdom, but were later sent to boarding schools in England, Switzerland, and Italy. Among the schools Power attended was Cobham Hall School in Kent, England. Later, both Power and her mother lived in a penthouse in the Roman quartiere of Parioli.

=== Acting career ===
Power began trying out for film roles at age 12. She made her screen debut at age 14 in the Italian film Menage all'italiana, starring alongside Ugo Tognazzi and Anna Moffo. Power subsequently appeared in several films, achieving notoriety for acting in roles that highlighted her sex appeal. In December 1966, her role in the film How I Learned to Love Women came under attack from the Italian public and government, as well as the Catholic Church. Ludovico Montini, brother of Pope Paul VI, and other Christian Democratic senators charged that Power was forced to rehearse "lewd scenes for the film countless times." The Vatican newspaper, L'Osservatore Romano, called the film's moral content dubious and opined that minors should have been banned from viewing it. In 1969, her starring role in the film Marquis de Sade: Justine resulted in its banning in Italy and in the seizure of all prints.

In an interview Power gave in 1966, she said that despite her typecasting she did not regard herself as a "Lolita." In a later interview in 1970, Power expressed regret for having let her mother choose sexually suggestive film roles for her.

=== Musical fame ===
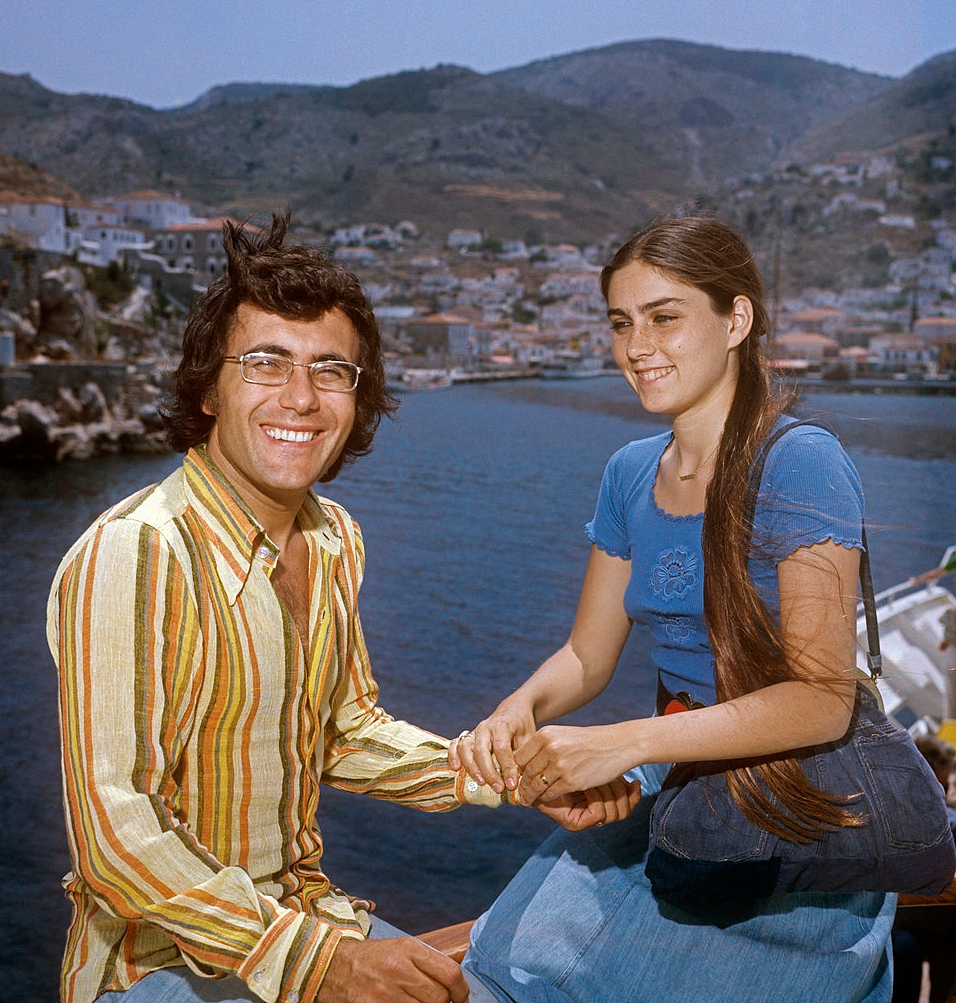
Power and Albano "Al Bano" Carrisi in Greece in 1975

In 1975, Power and her husband Albano "Al Bano" Carrisi founded the singing duo Al Bano and Romina Power, which became a sensation in Continental Europe and Latin America. They released multiple albums in different languages and achieved 7th place for Italy in both the 1976 and 1985 Eurovision Song Contests. Their biggest hits included "Felicità", "Sharazan", and "Ci sarà". At the Sanremo Music Festival, the duo placed second in 1982 with "Felicità" and won the 1984 festival with "Ci sarà"; they later placed third in 1987 with "Nostalgia canaglia" and in 1989 with "Cara terra mia".

=== Later years ===
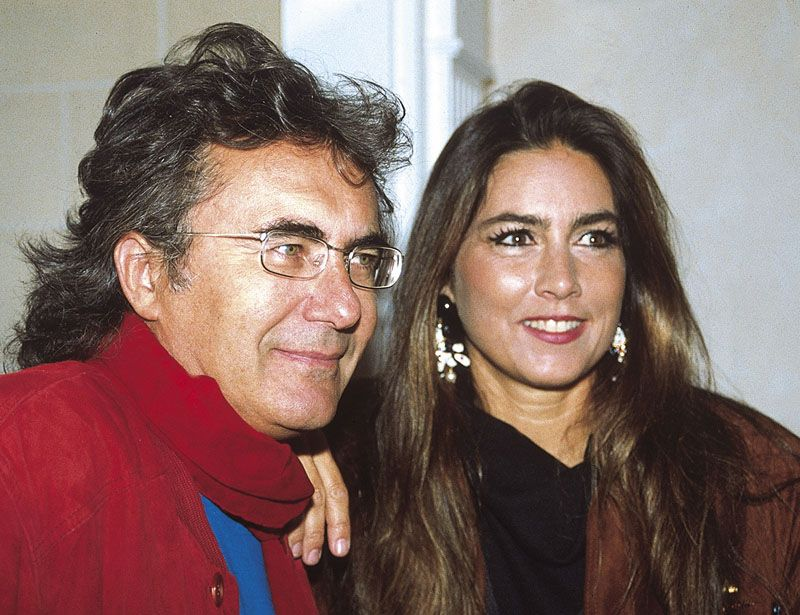
Power and Carrisi in the 1990s

In 2005, Power was a judge in the Italian TV show Ballando con le Stelle. Between 2006 and 2007, she organized exhibitions of her paintings, mainly in Milan. At the same time she dedicated herself to directing her film Upaya.

In 2007, Power moved back to the United States, buying a house in Sedona, Arizona. According to an interview she gave to the Italian press at the time, she felt to be perceived by the Italian public merely as a performer of "Il ballo del qua-qua" (a song for children), and that she found it difficult to establish herself in Italy as a painter and writer. Power also stated that she was disturbed by the intrusive attention of the local press, which published multiple articles speculating about her private life and the disappearance of her daughter Ylenia.

Shortly after Power's relocation in 2008, her mother Linda Christian was diagnosed with colon cancer. Power went to live in her mother's house in Palm Springs, where she remained until her mother's death on July 22, 2011. In a November 2009 interview she gave to Italian TV she stated she had considered, at least for some time, a possible return to Italy. She has continued living and working in the United States.

In the fall of 2012 her album Da lontano was released, containing songs written in 1999. In the summer of 2013, Power and Carrisi reunited for a concert performance in Moscow.

== Personal life ==
Stanislas "Stash" Klossowski de Rola, the eldest son of the painter Balthus, proposed marriage to Power when she was 15 and he was 23. She accepted and her mother approved, provided that he wait until Power turned 18 and was allowed to develop artistically first. Klossowski de Rola introduced Power to Paul McCartney, Jane Asher, and Syd Barrett, with whom she later became friends. The couple later postponed their wedding indefinitely.

In 1969, Power announced her engagement to Albano Carrisi. Upon their engagement, Carrisi persuaded Power to refrain from accepting any more risqué film roles and restricted the presence of her mother on set. They married on July 26, 1970.

Power and Carrisi separated in 1999. Their divorce was finalized in 2012. They have four children:

- Ylenia Maria Sole (born November 29, 1970), their eldest daughter who went missing in New Orleans, Louisiana in January 1994 (declared dead in absentia in 2014).
- Yari Marco Carrisi (born April 21, 1973)
- Cristèl Chiara Carrisi (born December 25, 1985), who appeared in Italian reality TV show La Fattoria 2 (The Farm).
- Romina Yolanda Carrisi (born June 1, 1987), who appeared in the 2005 edition of Italian reality TV show Isola dei Famosi (a version of Survivor) with her father.

Power is a polyglot who speaks five languages: English, Italian, Spanish, French and Dutch. She is a follower of Tibetan Buddhism.

== Filmography ==
=== Films ===
Title	Year	Role	Notes
1965	Menage all'italiana	Stella	
1966	How I Learned to Love Women	Irene	
1967	Assicurarsi vergine	Lucia Impallomeni	
1967	Nel sole	Lorena Vivaldi	
1968	24 Hours in the Life of a Woman	Mariette	
1968	L'oro del mondo	Lorena Vivaldi	
1969	Il suo nome è Donna Rosa	Rosetta Belmonte	
1969	Pensando a te	Livia	
1969	Marquis de Sade: Justine	Justine	
1969	Carnal Circuit	Gloria Brighton	
1970	Mezzanotte d'amore	Rosetta Belmonte	
1970	Angeli senza paradiso	Anna Roskova	
1984	Champagne in paradiso	Paola Davis	
2007	Go Go Tales	Yolanda Vega	
2014	Il segreto di Italia	Adult Italia Martin	
2016	Quo Vado?	Herself	Cameo appearance
2021	Nightmare Alley	Show's viewer	Cameo appearance

=== Television ===
Year	Title	Role	Notes
1969	Nero Wolfe (Italian TV series)	Lois Jarrell	Episode: "Circuito chiuso"
1970	Doppia coppia	Herself/ Co-host	Variety show (season 2)
1981–1982	Fantastico	Herself/ Co-host	Variety show (season 2)
1985	Il tastomatto	Herself/ Host	Variety show
1985	I promessi sposi	Lucia Mondella	Special
1989–1990	Cinema Insieme	Herself/ Host	Interstitial program
1991	Albano e Romina Power Story	Herself/ Host	Special
1996	The Return of Sandokan	Maharani Surama	Series regular (4 episodes)
1996	Canzoni sotto l'albero	Herself/ Judge	Musical contest (season 5)
1998–2000	Per tutta la vita...?	Herself/ Host	Variety show (seasons 2–4)
2003	Tutti i sogni del mondo	Cinzia's teacher	Miniseries
2010	Ciak... Si canta!	Herself/ Contestant	Talent show (season 2)
2016	Così lontani così vicini	Herself/ Co-host	Reality show (season 3)
2017	Standing Ovation	Herself/ Judge	Talent show
2020	Amici di Maria De Filippi	Herself/ Guest	Performer

== Discography ==
=== Solo ===
- 12 canzoni e una poesia (1969)
- Ascolta, ti racconto di un amore (1974)
- Con un paio di Blue-Jeans (1974)
- Da lontano (2012)

=== With Al Bano ===
- Atto I (1975)
- 1978 (1978)
- Aria pura (1979)
- Sharazan (1981) (Spanish)
- Felicità (1982)
- Felicidad (1982) (Spanish)
- Che angelo sei (1982)
- Que ángel será (1983) (Spanish)
- The Golden Orpheus Festival 1984 (1984)
- Effetto amore (1984)
- Sempre sempre (1986)
- Siempre siempre (1986) (Spanish)
- Libertà! (1987)
- Libertad (1987) (Spanish)
- Fragile (1988)
- Fragile (1988) (Spanish)
- Fotografia di un momento (1990)
- Fotografía de un momento (1990) (Spanish)
- Weihnachten bei uns zu Hause (1990) (also known as Corriere di Natale)
- Navidad ha llegado (1991) (Spanish)
- Vincerai (1991)
- Vencerás (1991) (Spanish)
- Notte e giorno (1993)
- El tiempo de amarse (1993) (Spanish)
- Emozionale (1995)
- Amor sagrado (1995) (Spanish)
- Ancora... Zugabe (1996)
- The Very Best – Live aus Verona (2015)
- Raccogli l'attimo (2020)

== Bibliography ==
- Al Bano & Romina Power: Autoritratto dalla A alla R (Rizzoli, 1989)
- Cercando mio padre (Gremese, 1998)
- Ho sognato Don Chisciotte (Bompiani, 2000)
- Kalifornia (It's Here Now) (Arcana, 2004)
- Upaya (Fazi Editore, 2005)
- Ti prendo per mano (Mondadori, 2015)
- Karma Express (Mondadori, 2017)

Preceded by Wess & Dori Ghezzi	Italy in the Eurovision Song Contest; 1976 (as Al Bano and Romina Power)	Succeeded by Mia Martini
Preceded by Alice & Franco Battiato	Italy in the Eurovision Song Contest; 1985 (as Al Bano and Romina Power)	Succeeded by Umberto Tozzi & Raf
