= Carrisi =

Carrisi is an Italian surname from Salento. Notable people with the surname include:

- Albano Carrisi (born 1943), Italian singer, actor and winemaker
- Donato Carrisi (born 1973), Italian writer, film director and screenwriter
- Ylenia Carrisi (1970–disapp. 1994), the eldest daughter of Albano Carrisi

== See also ==
- Carisi
