= Loredana =

Loredana is an Italian and Romanian feminine given name, claimed to be invented by French author George Sand in her novel Mattea (1833) – although the name had been documented prior – and later popularized by Luciano Zuccoli with L'amore di Loredana (1908). It may have been inspired by the real-life Venetian surname Loredan, itself from the toponym Loreo, Veneto, which originated from its Latin name Lauretum, meaning "laurel field".

A related version, Oredana, exists in Italy, originating from wrongly perceiving the opening L as an article (L'Oredana).

Notable people with the name include:

- Ioana Loredana Roșca (born 1996), Romanian tennis player
- Loredana (actress) (1924–2016), Italian actress
- Loredana Auletta (born 1969), Italian softball player
- Loredana Bertè (born 1950), Italian singer
- Loredana Boboc (born 1984), Romanian gymnast
- Loredana Bujor (born 1972), Romanian tennis player
- Loredana Cannata (born 1975), Italian actress
- Loredana Capone (born 1964), Italian politician
- Loredana De Petris (born 1957), Italian politician
- Loredana Dinu (born 1984), Romanian épée fencer
- Loredana Errore (born 1984), Romanian-born Italian singer
- Loredana Groza (born 1970), Romanian singer
- Loredana Lanzani (born 1965), Italian-American mathematician
- Loredana Lecciso (born 1972), Italian entertainer
- Loredana Marcello (1518–1572), Dogaressa of Venice
- Loredana Angela Mihai, Romanian mathematician, numerical analyst and academic
- Loredana Nusciak (1942–2006), Italian actress and model
- Loredana Polezzi, Italian literary critic
- Loredana Sasso (born 1957), Italian academic
- Loredana Sciolla (born 1947), Italian sociologist, academic and author
- Loredana Simioli (1974–2019), Italian actress and television host
- Loredana Simonetti (1930–2026), Italian middle-distance runner
- Loredana Sperini (born 1970), Swiss artist
- Loredana Toma (born 1995), Romanian female weightlifter
- Loredana Trigilia (born 1976), Italian wheelchair fencer
- Loredana Zefi (born 1995), Swiss rapper
- Loredana Zisu (born 1979), Romanian swimmer
- Loredana Zugna (born 1952), Italian sports shooter
