= Un po' artista un po' no =

Studio album by Adriano Celentano
- Released: 1980
- Label: Clan

Adriano Celentano chronology
Me, live! (1979)	Un po' artista un po' no (1980)	Deus (1981)

Professional ratings
Review scores
Source	Rating
AllMusic	3/5 stars
Recensiamo Musica	positive

Un po' artista un po' no is a studio album by Italian singer Adriano Celentano, released in 1980 on his label Clan.

After the success of his previous-year's album Soli, Celentano decided not to change a winning team. All the songs on Un po' artista un po' no are composed by Toto Cutugno, with lyrics by Cristiano Minellono.

The song "L'italiano" could have been included on this album. Cutugno offered him the song, but Celentano turned it down.

The album's cover features a photo of Celentano with young Pamela Prati.

== Track listing ==
All lyrics are written by Cristiano Minellono; all music is composed by Toto Cutugno.

No.	Title	Length
1.	"Un po' artista un po' no"	4:59
2.	"L'orologio"	4:44
3.	"Manifesto"	4:36
4.	"Il tempo se ne va"	3:48
5.	"Una parola non ci scappa mai"	4:18
6.	"Non se ne parla nemmeno"	4:16
7.	"Se non è amore"	4:18
8.	"Spettabile Signore"	3:02

== Charts ==
Chart (1980)	Peak position
Italy (Musica e dischi)	4
