= Joe Dassin (Le Costume blanc) =

1975 studio album by Joe Dassin

Studio album by Joe Dassin
- Released: November 22, 1975
- Recorded: Studio CBE, Paris
- Genre: chanson
- Label: CBS Disques
- Producer: Jacques Plait

Joe Dassin chronology
Joe Dassin (Si tu t'appelles Mélancolie) (1974)	Joe Dassin (Le Costume blanc) (1975)	Le Jardin du Luxembourg (1976)

Singles from Joe Dassin (Le Costume blanc)
- 1. "Et si tu n'existais pas" / "Ça va pas changer le monde" Released: 1975; 2. "Ça va pas changer le monde" / "Il faut naître à Monaco" Released: 1976; 3. "Et si tu n'existais pas" / "Salut" Released: 1976

Joe Dassin (commonly called Le Costume blanc after the fourth track on side 1 or Ça va pas changer le monde after the first track on side 2) is the ninth French studio album by Joe Dassin. It came out in 1975 on CBS Disques.

== Commercial performance ==
The album was a big seller for CBS.

== Track listing ==
Side 1
No.	Title	Writer(s)	Length
1.	"Et si tu n'existais pas"	Vito Pallavicini, Toto Cutugno, Pasquale Losito	3:25
2.	"Il faut naître à Monaco"	Pierre Delanoë, Claude Lemesle, Joe Dassin	2:02
3.	"Chanson triste"	Pierre Delanoë, Claude Lemesle, Bernard Estardy	3:14
4.	"Le Costume blanc"	Pierre Delanoë, Claude Lemesle, Joe Dassin	3:06
5.	"L'Albatros"	Vito Pallavicini, Toto Cutugno, Tonet	3:05
6.	"Alors qu'est-ce que c'est ?" (Harmour Love)	Stevie Wonder	2:41

Side 2
No.	Title	Writer(s)	Length
1.	"Ça va pas changer le monde"	Vito Pallavicini, Joe Dassin, Pino Massara	3:00
2.	"Salut"	Vito Pallavicini, Toto Cutugno, Pasquale Losito	3:20
3.	"Carolina" (Sad Sweet Dreamer)	Des Parton	3:14
4.	"C'est la nuit" (Dance With Me)	Johanna Hall, John Hall	2:50
5.	"Ma musique" (Sailing)	Gavin Sutherland	2:50
6.	"Piano mécanique"	Pierre Delanoë, Claude Lemesle, Claude Bolling	2:36
