= Sanremo Music Festival 1987 =

Italian song contest (37th edition)

Dates and venue
- Semi-final 1: 4 February 1987
- Semi-final 2: 5 February 1987
- Semi-final 3: 6 February 1987
- Final: 7 February 1987
- Venue: Teatro Ariston; Sanremo, Italy

Organisation
- Broadcaster: Radiotelevisione italiana (RAI)
- Presenters: Pippo Baudo

Big Artists section
- Number of entries: 24
- Winner: "Si può dare di più" Gianni Morandi, Enrico Ruggeri and Umberto Tozzi

Newcomers' section
- Number of entries: 16
- Winner: "La notte dei pensieri" Michele Zarrillo

The Sanremo Music Festival 1987 (Italian: Festival di Sanremo 1987), officially the 37th Italian Song Festival (37º Festival della canzone italiana), was the 37th annual Sanremo Music Festival, held at the Teatro Ariston in Sanremo between 4 and 7 February 1987 and broadcast by Radiotelevisione italiana (RAI). The show was presented by Pippo Baudo, while Carlo Massarini hosted the segments from the Sanremo PalaRock, where a number of foreign guests performed.

The winners of the Big Artists section were the trio consisting Gianni Morandi, Enrico Ruggeri and Umberto Tozzi with the song "Si può dare di più", while Fiorella Mannoia won the Critics Award with the song "Quello che le donne non dicono". Michele Zarrillo won the Newcomers section with the song "La notte dei pensieri".

During the final night, an ashen-faced Baudo came out to announce the death of four-time Sanremo winner Claudio Villa.

== Participants and results ==
=== Big Artists ===
Big Artists section
Song	Artist(s)	Songwriter(s)	Rank
"Si può dare di più"	Gianni Morandi, Enrico Ruggeri and Umberto Tozzi	Giancarlo Bigazzi; Umberto Tozzi; Raffaele Riefoli	1
"Figli"	Toto Cutugno	Toto Cutugno	2
"Nostalgia canaglia"	Al Bano and Romina Power	Vito Pallavicini; Willy Molco; Albano Carrisi; Romina Power; Vito Mercurio	3
"Io amo"	Fausto Leali	Toto Cutugno; Franco Fasano; Italo Ianne; Fausto Leali	4
"Il sognatore"	Peppino di Capri	Toto Cutugno; Depsa	5
"Tanti auguri"	Marcella Bella	Gino Paoli; Gianni Bella	6
"Canzone d’amore"	Ricchi e Poveri	Toto Cutugno; G. Rampazzo; Dario Farina	7
"Quello che le donne non dicono"	Fiorella Mannoia	Enrico Ruggeri; Luigi Schiavone	8 / Critics Award
"Come dentro un film"	Luca Barbarossa	Luca Barbarossa	9
"Aria e musica"	Christian	Silvio Amato; Franco Morgia	10
"Vita mia"	Lena Biolcati	Stefano D'Orazio; Marco Tansini	11
"Destino"	Rossana Casale	Guido Morra; Maurizio Fabrizio	12
"Canto per te"	Flavia Fortunato	Elio Palumbo; Antonello de Sanctis; Miro Banis	13
"E non si finisce mai"	Dori Ghezzi	Adelio Cogliati; Piero Cassano	14
"L’odore del mare"	Eduardo De Crescenzo	Guido Morra; Eduardo De Crescenzo; Maurizio Fabrizio	15
"Bella età"	Scialpi	Franco Migliacci; Giovanni Scialpi; Roberto Zaneli	16
"Dimmi che cos’è"	Le Orme	Aldo Tagliapietra	17
"Dal cuore in poi"	Mango	Alberto Salerno; Armando Mango; Giuseppe Mango	18
"Sinué"	Tony Esposito	Gianluigi Di Franco; Tony Esposito	19
"Pigramente signora"	Patty Pravo	Mauro Arnaboldi; Franca Evangelisti	20
"Il Garibaldi innamorato"	Sergio Caputo	Sergio Caputo	21
"Madonna di Venere"	Mario Castelnuovo	Mario Castelnuovo	22
"Rosanna"	Nino Buonocore	Nino Buonocore	23
"Bolero"	Nada	Gerry Manzoli	24

=== Newcomers ===
Newcomers section
Song	Artist(s)	Songwriter(s)	Rank
"La notte dei pensieri"	Michele Zarrillo	Luigi Albertelli; Luigi Lopez; Michele Zarrillo	1
"Straniero"	Miki	Michele Porru; Marco Tansini	2
"Briciole di pane"	Future	M. Festuccia	3
"Notte di Praga"	Andrea Mirò	A. Istrioni; Graziano Pegoraro	4
"Un bacio alla mia età"	Enrico Cifiello	Silvio Testi; Roberto Zaneli; Romano Musumarra	5
"La forza della mente"	Claudio Patti	Claudio Patti; Norina Piras	6
"In volo nel futuro"	Ricky Palazzolo	Alberto Salerno; Renato Brioschi	7
"Fai piano"	Mariella Nava	Mariella Nava	8
"Campi d'atterraggio"	Chiari e Forti	Cheope; Angelillo	Eliminated
"Conta chi canta"	Umberto Marzotto	Umberto Marzotto	Eliminated
"L'esteta"	Paolo Scheriani	Paolo Scheriani; Gianni Farè	Eliminated
"Ma che bella storia"	Teo	Enzo Miceli; Gaetano Lorefice	Eliminated
"Nel mio profondo fondo"	Alessandro Bono	Alessandro Bono	Eliminated
"Non cadere mai in ginocchio"	Berger	Alberto Salerno; A. Bartolozzi	Eliminated
"Primo tango"	Paola Turci	Gaio Chiocchio; Mario Castelnuovo; Roberto Righini	Eliminated / Critics Award
"Stringimi le mani"	Charley Deanesi	Roberto Ferri; Charley Deanesi	Eliminated

== Broadcasts ==
=== Local broadcasts ===
All shows were broadcast on Rai Uno.

=== International broadcasts ===
Known details on the broadcasts in each country, including the specific broadcasting stations and commentators are shown in the tables below.

International broadcasters of the Sanremo Music Festival 1987
Country	Broadcaster	Channel(s)	Commentator(s)	Ref(s)
Australia	SBS	SBS TV (Note: Delayed broadcast on 7 March at 21:30 (AEST))		
United States	WQTV (Note: Delayed broadcast on 27 March at 23:00 (EDT))			
Yugoslavia	JRT	TV Beograd 1, TV Titograd 1, TV Zagreb 1 (Note: Delayed broadcast on 28 March at 22:50 (CET))		
