= Ça va pas changer le monde =

Single by Joe Dassin

from the album Joe Dassin (Le Costume blanc)
- A-side: "Ça va pas changer le monde"
- B-side: "Il faut naître à Monaco"
- Released: January 1976
- Recorded: 1975
- Genre: Chanson, pop
- Length: 3:00
- Label: CBS Disques
- Songwriter(s): Lyrics: Vito Pallavicini; Pierre Delanoë; Claude Lemesle; Music: Joe Dassin; Pino Massara
- Producer(s): Jacques Plait

Joe Dassin singles chronology
"L'été indien (Africa)" (1975)	"Ça va pas changer le monde" (1976)	"Et si tu n'existais pas" / "Salut" (1976)

Music video
- "Ça va pas changer le monde" (audio) "Ça va pas changer le monde" (Live) on YouTube

"Ça va pas changer le monde" ("It Won't Change the World") is a song by Joe Dassin from his 1975 album Joe Dassin (Le Costume blanc).

Released as a single, in France it was number one on the singles sales chart for two consecutive weeks from January 22 to February 4, 1976.

== Charts ==
Chart (1976)	Peak position
Belgium (Ultratop 50 Flanders)	16
France (IFOP)	1
Netherlands (Dutch Top 40)	23
Netherlands (Single Top 100)	27
Switzerland (Schweizer Hitparade)	15
