= Albano Carrisi =

Italian recording artist; singer and actor

Al Bano
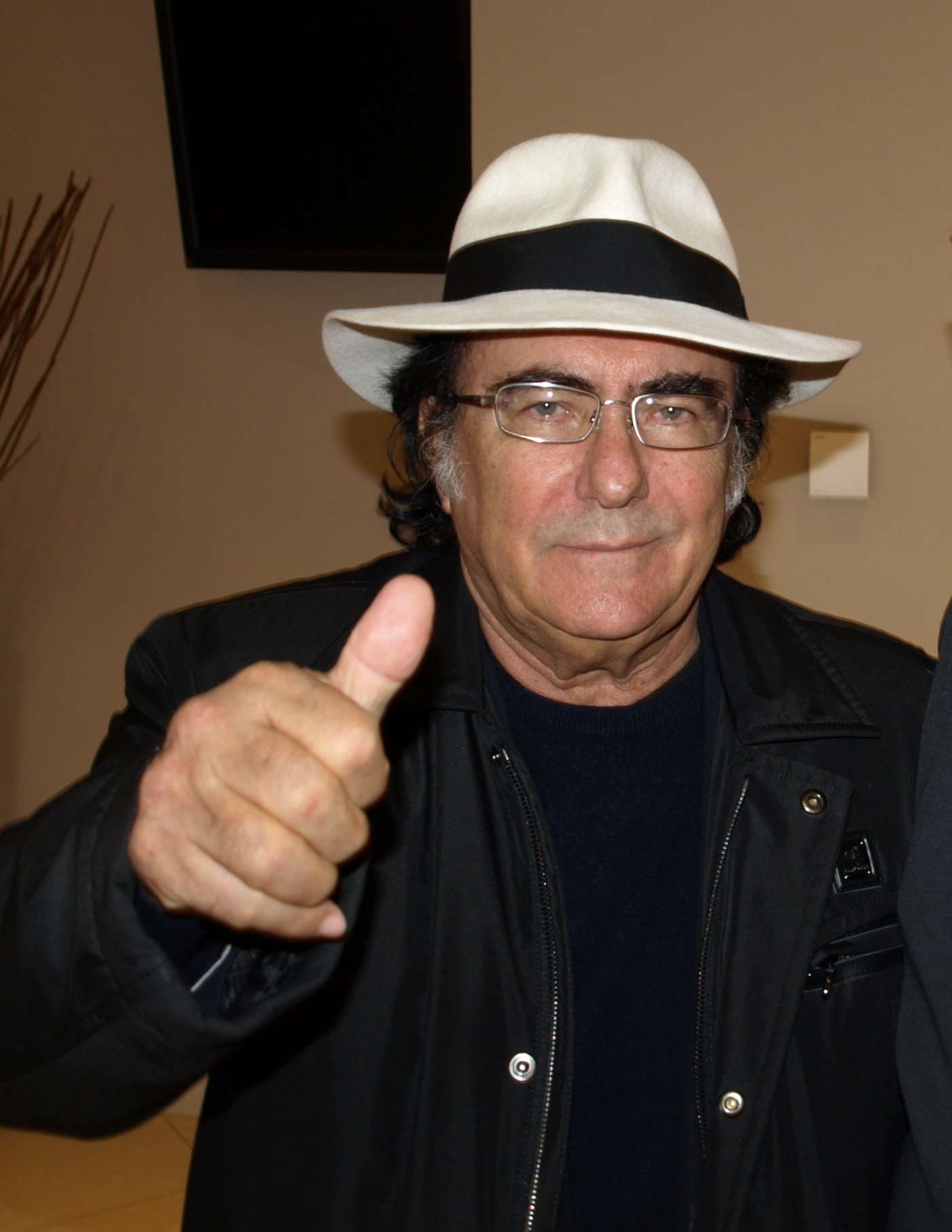
- Al Bano in 2014

Background information
- Also known as: Al Bano
- Born: Albano Antonio Carrisi; 20 May 1943 (age 83); Cellino San Marco, Kingdom of Italy
- Origin: Apulia, Italy
- Genres: Pop
- Occupations: Singer; actor; winemaker
- Instrument: Vocals (tenor)
- Years active: 1965–present
- Labels: La voce del padrone; EMI Italiana
- Member of: Al Bano and Romina Power
- Website: www.albanocarrisi.eu

Albano Antonio Carrisi (Italian: [alˈbaːno karˈriːzi]; born 20 May 1943), better known as Al Bano, is an Italian singer and actor. Having sold over 25 million records globally and career spanning seven decades, he is one of the most recognisable Italian singers in the world. He has gained worldwide notability due to his four and a half octave vocal range as well as his personal and professional association with Romina Power, daughter of Hollywood actor Tyrone Power, lasting until the 1990s. Carrisi is acclaimed for singing with operatic affinity in pop, rock and italo disco repertoires with extensive head voice and minimal usage of falsetto vocal register. As of 2023, he has participated in 15 editions of the Sanremo Music Festival, tying the record for most participations with Anna Oxa, Milva, Peppino di Capri and Toto Cutugno; this includes a victory in 1984 duetting with Power. He additionally took part in the Sanremo Giovani selection in 1965.

In 2016, he was awarded Albanian citizenship owing to his close ties with the country and a forename referring to the land.

== Early life ==
Carrisi was born in the town of Cellino San Marco in the province of Brindisi, Apulia, where he still lives. His mother Iolanda Ottino named him Albano because, when he was born, his father Carmelo Carrisi was fighting in Albania for the Royal Italian Army during World War II. He has one brother, Franco Carrisi (known as Kocis).

== Career ==
Having moved to Milan for work, Carrisi was noticed by a producer. He made his debut in 1966, both as a singer, at the Festival delle Rose, and on television. In 1968, he won the Un disco per l'estate, an Italian song contest, with "Pensando a te" ("Thinking of you"). He went on to record some major hits such as "La siepe" and "Nel sole", which sold 600,000 copies in Italy within three months of its release in 1967, and eventually over one million copies. It was awarded a gold disc in July 1968.

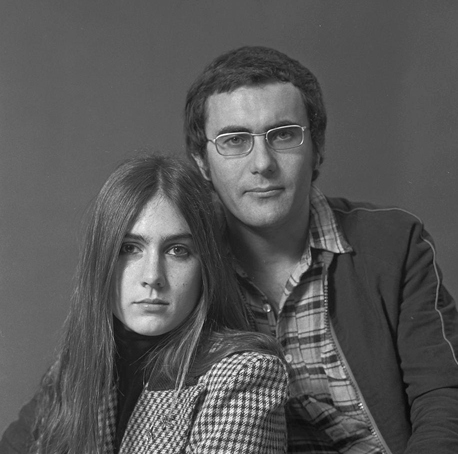
Al Bano & Romina Power in 1976

Soon afterwards, he started a musical collaboration with Romina Power (daughter of the American actor Tyrone Power), whom he married in 1970. After their marriage, they recorded "Storia di due innamorati". They sang as the duo Al Bano & Romina Power for almost thirty years; their work has been especially popular in Italy, Austria, France, Spain, Bulgaria, Romania, Greece, Russia and Germany. They released "Dialogo" in 1975 and took part in the Eurovision Song Contest 1976 with the song "We'll Live It All Again" ("Noi lo rivivremo di nuovo"). They sang "Sharazan" in 1981 and the following year they took part in the Sanremo Music Festival with the song "Felicità", which came second. They won first prize in 1984 singing "Ci sarà" and again took part in the Eurovision Song Contest 1985 with "Magic Oh Magic". Both their Eurovision entries placed 7th. Other hits of 1987 include: "Nostalgia canaglia" (awarded 3rd prize at Festival di Sanremo '87) and "Libertà". Those successful songs were followed by "Cara terra mia", which came in third once more at the 1989 Sanremo Music Festival, and "Oggi sposi" which placed 8th at the 1991 Sanremo Music Festival.

Al Bano returned to his solo career in 1996 with "È la mia vita" which was followed by "Verso il sole" in 1997 and "Ancora in volo" in 1999 (that year, both his duo and his marriage with Romina broke up). In 1997, he also played in "Herşeye Rağmen" ("Nonetheless" in Turkish), a music video of Sima Sarıkaya, a Turkish singer. In 2000, Al Bano returned to the Eurovision stage, providing backing vocals for the Swiss entry (performed in Italian) "La vita cos'è?" performed by Jane Bogaert. This song placed 20th out of 24 in the contest. On 16 October 2001, Carrisi was nominated Goodwill Ambassador of the Food and Agriculture Organization of the United Nations (FAO).

In 2005, with his daughter, Romina Carrisi, Al Bano starred in the Italian reality show L'isola dei Famosi (an Italian version of Celebrity Survivor). He returned to the Sanremo Music Festival in 2007, where he sang "Nel perdono" which came in second place.

Al Bano still tours all over the world. He appears often on Italian television and has a large number of fans who follow his career very closely. To date, Al Bano has sold 165 million albums around the world. He has visited Albania a number of times. He was there for a concert in 1989 and has enjoyed great popularity there.

In June 2016, Al Bano was granted Albanian citizenship due to his close ties with the country and career successes in Albania.

In March 2019, Al Bano was included in the blacklist of the Ukrainian website "Myrotvorets" and the Ukrainian government banned him from entering Ukraine because of his support of the 2014 Russian annexation of Crimea.

In April 2020 Al Bano released a dual-language song in Italian and English praising the natural beauty of Latvia. Terra d'Ambra e di Emozioni / Land of Amber was written and composed by Charles Goodger with Italian lyrics by Alberto Zeppieri. The Latvian Tourist Board used it in a promotional video.

== Opera ==
Al Bano grew up listening to opera for which he has a great passion. A tenor, he has released several opera albums. In 1997, he released an opera solo album entitled Concerto Classico, which went double platinum in a short time. Songs he sang on that album include "Una furtiva lagrima", "Va, pensiero", "La nostra serenata", "E lucevan le stelle", "Ave Maria", and "Canto alla Gioia" (inspired by Ludwig van Beethoven's "Ode to Joy"). (Note: It is unclear as to which version of "Ave Maria" this was, but the best-known ones are those by Bach/Gounod and by Schubert.)

== Filmography ==
Year	Title	Role	Notes
1967	Nel sole	Carlo Carrera	Leading role
1968	L'oro del mondo	Carlo Carrera	Leading role
1969	Il ragazzo che sorride	Giorgio	Leading role
1969	Il suo nome è Donna Rosa	Andrea	Leading role
1969	Pensando a te	Carlo	Leading role
1970	Mezzanotte d'amore	Andrea	Leading role
1970	Angeli senza paradiso	Franz Schubert	Leading role
1984	Champagne in paradiso	Marco Allegri	Leading role
1985	I promessi sposi	Renzo Tramaglino	Leading role
2016	Poveri ma ricchi	Himself	Cameo appearance
2016	Quo Vado?	Himself	Cameo appearance

== Personal life ==
On 26 July 1970, Al Bano married Romina Power (daughter of the American actor Tyrone Power), who had already started to share her musical career with him, and remained his stage partner for about 30 years.

Carrisi and Power separated in 1999. Their divorce was finalized in 2012. They have a son, Yari (1973), and three daughters: Ylenia Maria Solle (1970 – went missing in New Orleans in 1994), Cristel Chiara (1985; starred in the Reality TV show La Fattoria, an Italian version of The Farm) and Romina Iolanda (1987). He has one daughter and one son from girlfriend and showgirl Loredana Lecciso, Jasmine Caterina (2001) and Albano Giovanni (2002).

In the summer of 2013, Al Bano and Romina Power reunited, reportedly only on a professional basis and for one final time, for a concert performance in Moscow. They later performed as guests at the Sanremo Festival 2015. They also performed together in Atlantic City, USA, in April 2015, and following that, in Los Angeles.

On 30 May 2015, Al Bano produced a show at the Arena di Verona, before a sold-out audience of 11,000, in which he starred with Romina Power. The show, featuring Tyrone Power Jr. and other special guests was transmitted by the Italian national TV network RAI, and was watched in over eight countries by 51,000,000 viewers around the globe, a 37 ratings share.

== See also ==
- List of celebrities who own wineries and vineyards

== Notes ==
Preceded by Wess & Dori Ghezzi	Italy in the Eurovision Song Contest; 1976 (as Al Bano and Romina Power)	Succeeded by Mia Martini
Preceded by Alice & Franco Battiato	Italy in the Eurovision Song Contest; 1985 (as Al Bano and Romina Power)	Succeeded by Umberto Tozzi & Raf
