= Salut =

Salut may refer to:

== Places ==
- Îles de Salut, also known as Salvation's Islands
- La Salut, neighbourhood in the Gràcia district of Barcelona, Catalonia, Spain
- Salut, Armenia, a village in the province of Shirak

== Other ==
- Salut, an implementation of Telepathy (software)
- Salut d'amor, Occitan genre
- "Salut" (song), a 1976 song by Joe Dassin
- Aranza Salut (born 1991), Argentinian tennis player
- Jean Salut (1943–2025), French rugby union player

== See also ==
- Salute
- Port Salut, a type of cheese
- Port-Salut, Haiti
