= Salut (song) =

Single by Joe Dassin

from the album Joe Dassin (Le Costume blanc)
- A-side: "Et si tu n'existais pas"; "Salut"
- Released: 1976
- Genre: Chanson, pop
- Length: 3:20
- Label: CBS Disques
- Songwriters: Pierre Delanoë, Vito Pallavicini, Claude Lemesle, Pasquale Losito, Salvatore Cutugno
- Producer: Jacques Plait

Joe Dassin singles chronology
"Ça va pas changer le monde" (1976)	"Et si tu n'existais pas" / "Salut" (1976)	"Il était une fois nous deux" (1976)

Music video
- Salut (audio); Salut (official live); Hélène Ségara, Joe Dassin "Salut" on YouTube

Salut is a song performed by Joe Dassin from his 1975 album Joe Dassin (Le Costume blanc) (CBS 81147).

It was also released as a single, in 1976 with "Et si tu n'existais pas" on the other side.

It is a French adaptation, by Pierre Delanoë and Claude Lemesle, of an Italian song, "Uomo dove vai" (by Toto Cutugno). The other adaptation is in Russian (Russian: Здравствуй), lyrics are written by Igor Kokhanovsky, the singer is Lev Leshchenko.

It is one of the most famous songs by Dassin.

== Track listing ==
7" single (CBS 4112 and CBS C5 8122)

1. "Et si tu n'existais pas" (3:25)
2. "Salut" (3:20)

or

1. "Salut" (3:20)
2. "Et si tu n'existais pas" (3:25)

== Cover versions ==
- 2013: Hélène Ségara (in a virtual duet with Dassin) on the album Et si tu n'existais pas
