= Soli =

Soli or SOLI may refer to:

== Places ==
- Soli, Cyprus, an ancient city on the island of Cyprus
- Soli (Cilicia), an ancient city in Cilicia, later renamed Pompeiopolis, and the source of the word solecism
- Soli, Iran, a village in Gilan Province, Iran
- Soli (region), a 10th-century region that is today mostly Tuzla Canton, Bosnia and Herzegovina

== Music ==
- A series of compositions by the Mexican composer Carlos Chávez:
  - Soli I
  - Soli II
  - Soli III
  - Soli IV
- Soli, in music, a divided string section with only one player to a line, or an indication that the music is being performed by a soloist; See Solo (music)
- "Soli" (Mina song), 1965
- Soli (Adriano Celentano album), 1979
  - "Soli" (Adriano Celentano song), the title song

== Other uses ==
- Project Soli, a small radar chip made by Google's ATAP division to be used for gesture recognition
- Society of Our Lady of the Isles, an Anglican religious order of nuns in Scotland
- Sons of Liberty International, a self-described non-profit security contracting firm founded by Matthew VanDyke
- Soli language, a Bantu language of Zambia
- Soli people of Zambia

== See also ==
- Solidaritätszuschlag (solidarity tax), a tax in Germany to pay for the development of former East Germany
