= Solmi =

Solmi is a surname. Notable people with the surname include:

- Arrigo Solmi (1873–1944), Italian scholar and politician
- Federico Solmi (born 1973), Italian visual artist
- Sergio Solmi (1899–1981), Italian poet, essayist, and literary critic

== See also ==
- Park Sol-mi (born 1978), South Korean actress
- Soli (disambiguation)
- Solresol, a constructed language where the word solmi means bad, wrong, or evil
