= Me, live! =

Live album by Adriano Celentano
- Released: 1979
- Label: Clan

Adriano Celentano chronology
Soli (1979)	Me, live! (1979)	Un po' artista un po' no (1980)

Me, live! is the first live album by Italian singer Adriano Celentano, released in 1979 on his label Clan.

== Overview ==
The album was recorded on 7 August 1977 at the Stadio Dino Manuzzi in Cesena, in front of an audience of about 30,000 people.

In addition to songs, the album include all the spoken interludes by Celentano, including a comical and mostly mimicked sketch with drummer Gianni Dall'Aglio and the introduction of "Storia d'amore", with Celentano stumbling over his words. In 2000, it was reissued on CD under the title Il concerto di Adriano.

Until 2012 album Adriano Live, it remained Celentano's only live album for over 30 years.

== Track listing ==
Side 1
No.	Title	Writer(s)	Length
1.	"Taparara"	Adriano Celentano	3:24
2.	"Pregherò"	Don Backy, Ben E. King, Elmo Glick	3:46
3.	"Bellissima"	Cristiano Minellono, Dario Baldan Bembo	4:03
4.	Untitled (Presentazione orchestra)	—	1:35
5.	".....When Love.."	D.B. Besquet, Miki Del Prete	4:35

Side 2
No.	Title	Writer(s)	Length
1.	"L'albero di 30 piani"	Celentano	4:10
2.	"A Woman in Love"	Frank Loesser	1:24
3.	"Rock Around the Clock"	Jimmy DeKnight, Max C. Freedman	1:55
4.	Untitled (Il pallone da basket)	—	0:40
5.	"Storia d'amore"	Celentano, Nando De Luca	6:05

Side 3
No.	Title	Writer(s)	Length
1.	"Il ragazzo della via Gluck"	Celentano, Detto Mariano	4:12
2.	"Svalutation"	Gino Santercole, Celentano, Vito Pallavicini, Luciano Beretta	5:00
3.	"Azzurro"	Paolo Conte, Vito Pallavicini	3:10

Side 4
No.	Title	Writer(s)	Length
1.	"Kiss Me Good-bye"	Barry Mason, Les Reed	7:15
2.	"Aih! Aih! Rock" "Rip It Up"	Celentano / Robert Blackwell, John Marascalco	4:34; 2:47
3.	"Prisencolinensinainciusol"	Celentano	2:50
4.	"Ciao ragazzi"	Del Prete, Mogol, Celentano, Mariano	1:42
