= Et si tu n'existais pas =

Song by Joe Dassin

from the album Joe Dassin (Le Costume blanc)
- A-side: "Salut"; "Et si tu n'existais pas"
- Released: 1976
- Recorded: Studio CBE, Paris
- Length: 3:25
- Label: CBS Disques
- Songwriters: Pierre Delanoë; Claude Lemesle; Vito Pallavicini
- Composers: Toto Cutugno; Pasquale Losito
- Producer: Jacques Plait

Joe Dassin singles chronology
"Ça va pas changer le monde" (1976)	"Et si tu n'existais pas" / "Salut" (1976)	"Il était une fois nous deux" (1976)

Music video
- "Et si tu n'existais pas" (audio) "Et si tu n'existais pas" (TV) on YouTube

"Et si tu n'existais pas" (English: And if you did not exist) is a 1975 song by Joe Dassin. It is the first track of his album Joe Dassin (Le Costume blanc). The lyrics are by Pierre Delanoë and Claude Lemesle, the music is by Salvatore Cutugno and Pasquale Losito. The song was covered by Iggy Pop (in French) in 2012.

== Track listings ==
7" promo single CBS 3907 (1975, France)

A. "Et si tu n'existais pas" (3:25)
AA. "Ça va pas changer le monde" (3:00)

7" single CBS 4112, CBS C5 8122 (1976)

1. "Et si tu n'existais pas" (3:25)
2. "Salut" (3:20)

or

1. "Salut" (3:20)
2. "Et si tu n'existais pas" (3:25)

== Charts ==
Chart (1976)	Peak position
Belgium (Ultratop 50 Flanders)	16
Belgium (Ultratop 50 Wallonia)	12
France (SNEP)	8

Chart (2010)	Peak position
Belgium (Flanders, Back Catalogue Singles)	19
Belgium (Wallonia, Back Catalogue Singles)	8
