= Sharazan =

Single by Al Bano and Romina Power

from the album Felicità
- Released: 1981
- Genre: Pop
- Length: 4:45
- Label: Baby
- Songwriters: Albano Carrisi, Romina Power, Ciro Dammicco

Al Bano and Romina Power singles chronology
"Aria pura" (1979)	"Sharazan" (1981)	"Felicità" (1982)

"Sharazan" is a song by Italian–American duo Al Bano and Romina Power, released in 1981. It was an international commercial success and remains one of their best-known hits.

== Meaning of the word ==
They are told to say that Sharazan means "Dreamland", what would fit to the Italian text.

There is a German Cover by Marco Bakker, the meaning there is the name of a girl in a far, probably Arabic country ("Rose im Wüstensand").

Another cover named "Parmesan", by a satirical Czech band "Triky a pověry" (meaning "Tricks And Superstitions", a name that sounds like Ricchi e Poveri: the band produced a dozen of parodies of Italian hits), stated that "parmesan is spread on bread".

== Track listing ==
- 7" Single

A. "Sharazan" – 4:45
B. "Prima notte d'amore" – 2:55

- Spanish 7" Single

A. "Sharazan" – 3:54
B. "Na, na, na" – 3:30

== Charts ==
Chart (1981–82)	Peak position
Belgium (Ultratop)	14
Italy (Musica e dischi)	3
Netherlands (Single Top 100)	15
Switzerland (Swiss Hitparade)	1
West Germany (Official German Charts)	7
