= Gruppo Italiano =

Italian band active in the 1980s

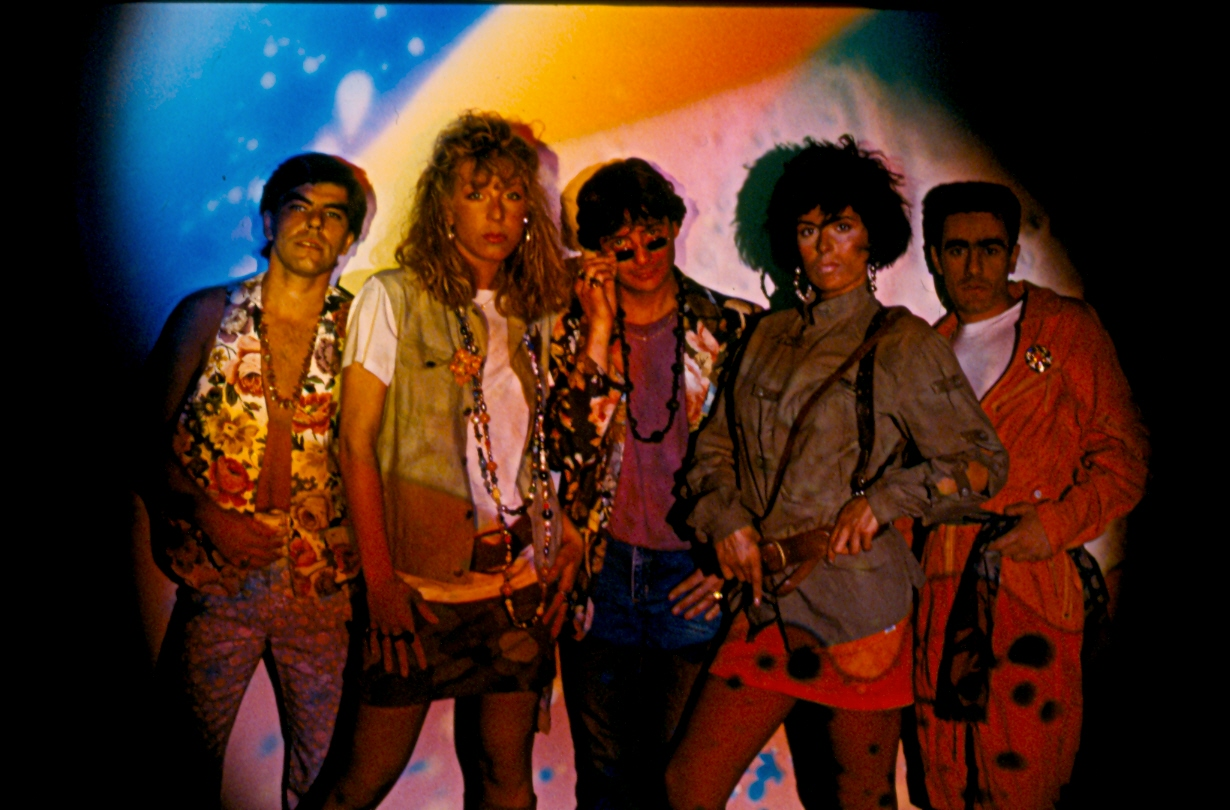
- Gruppo Italiano in 1985; from left to right: Bozo Del Bo, Raffaella Riva, Chicco Santulli, Patrizia Di Malta and Gigi Folino

Background information
- Origin: Italy
- Genres: Italo disco; dance-pop; easy listening
- Years active: 1980–1989
- Label: Ricordi
- Past members: Patrizia Di Malta; Raffaella Riva; Gigi Folino; Roberto "Bozo" Del Bo; Enrico Francesco "Chicco" Santulli

Gruppo Italiano ("Italian Group") were an Italian Italo disco band active in the 1980s. They are best known for the song "Tropicana", which ranked sixth on the Italian hit parade in 1983.

== History ==
Gruppo Italiano was founded in 1980 when Roberto "Bozo" Del Bo and Enrico Francesco "Chicco" Santulli, upon returning to Italy from a four months stay in Los Angeles, California, decided to set up a band that would merge sophisticated musical ideas and humour. The group's best-known line-up comprised Patrizia Di Malta, Raffaella Riva, Gigi Folino, Del Bo and Santulli. In 1984 the group entered the Sanremo Music Festival with the song "Anni ruggenti" ("Roaring Years"), that peaked at number 12 on hit parade.

== Personnel ==
- Patrizia Di Malta – vocals
- Raffaella Riva – vocals, percussion
- Gigi Folino – bass
- Bozo Del Bo – drums
- Chicco Santulli – guitar

== Discography ==
- Maccherock (1982)
- Tapioca manioca (1984)
- Surf in Italy (1985)

== Sources ==
- Salvatori, Dario (1989). Storia dell'Hit Parade. Gramese. ISBN 8876054391.
- Deregibus, Enrico (2010). Dizionario completo della Canzone Italiana. Giunti Editore. ISBN 978-8809756250.
- Anselmi, Eddy (2009). Festival di Sanremo: almanacco illustrato della canzone italiana. Panini Comics. ISBN 978-8863462296.
