= Pensando a te =

- Directed by: Aldo Grimaldi
- Screenplay by: Giovanni Grimaldi
- Story by: Aldo Grimaldi
- Starring: Romina Power; Al Bano; Helena Ronee; Francesco Mulè; Yvonne Sanson; Riccardo Garrone
- Cinematography: Fausto Zuccoli
- Edited by: Daniele Alabiso
- Music by: Augusto Martelli
- Distributed by: Titanus
- Release date: 1969
- Country: Italy
- Language: Italian

Pensando a te (Italian for 'Thinking of you') is a 1969 Italian musicarello comedy film directed by Aldo Grimaldi and starring Al Bano and Romina Power.

== Cast ==
- Romina Power as Livia
- Al Bano as Carlo
- Helene Ronee as The English Teacher
- Nino Taranto as Filippo Leccisi
- Antonella Steni as Antonella Pugliesi
- Yvonne Sanson as Livia's Mother
- Riccardo Garrone as Livia's Father
- Francesco Mulé as Commendator Aldini the undertaker
- Roger Mattson as Fabrizio
- Isabella Biagini as Bernarda
- Marina Pagano as Giuliana
- Paolo Villaggio as Traffic Cop Filini
- Rosita Pisano as Santina
- Nino Terzo
