= Al Bano and Romina Power =

Italian–American pop music duo

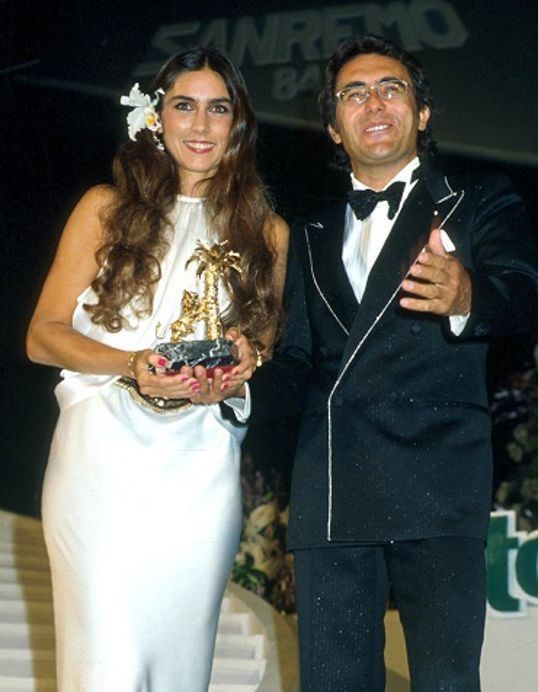
- Al Bano and Romina Power upon winning the Sanremo Music Festival 1984

Background information
- Origin: Italy
- Genre: Pop
- Years active: 1975–1999; 2013–present
- Labels: Baby; WEA
- Members: Albano Carrisi; Romina Power

Al Bano and Romina Power are an Italian–American pop music duo formed in 1975 by then-married couple Italian tenor Albano Carrisi and American singer Romina Power, the daughter of Hollywood actor Tyrone Power. They have recorded over 22 albums, which have sold 150 million copies across six decades. Their best known international hits include "Felicità", "Sharazan", "Tu, soltanto tu (Mi hai fatto innamorare)", "Ci sarà", "Sempre sempre", and "Libertà!". They participated twice in the Eurovision Song Contest in 1976 and 1985 and performed five times at the Sanremo Music Festival, winning in 1984 with the song "Ci sarà". The couple also shot seven films, based on their songs, between 1967 and 1984. The two separated in 1999 and divorced in 2012, but reunited professionally in 2013.

== Careers ==
Albano Carrisi met Romina Power, daughter of American actor Tyrone Power, during the filming of the movie Nel sole, named after one of his songs, in 1967. He had already released a number of solo recordings and she by then had appeared in several Italian films. The two married in 1970 in Cellino San Marco. Their debut single, "Storia di due innamorati", was released the same year by the labels La voce del padrone and Odeon, and went on to become a minor hit in Italy. The song appeared on Al Bano's solo album A cavallo di due stili. Power also released three solo albums between 1969 and 1974.

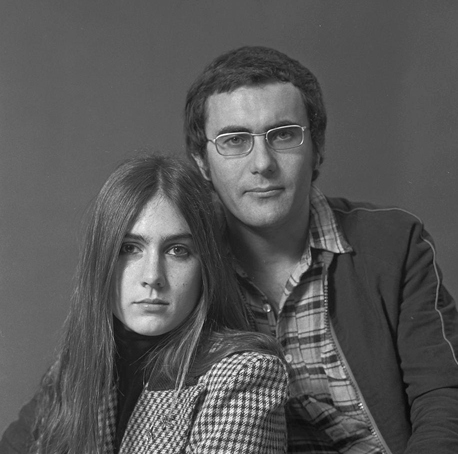
Al Bano & Romina Power in 1976

In 1975, the couple released their first album as a duo, Atto I (also known as Dialogo and Arena blanca, mar azul), which included popular song "Dialogo". They represented Italy at the Eurovision Song Contest 1976 with the song "We'll Live It All Again", sung in Italian and English, and finished seventh. They also recorded the song in Spanish and in French, as "Viviremos todo de nuevo" and "T'aimer encore une fois", respectively. The duo then made several recordings in French, including hits "Des nuits entières" and "Enlacés sur le sable" (French version of "Prima notte d'amore").

In 1981, they released the single "Sharazan", which went on to become their breakthrough international hit, and released a Spanish language album. In 1982, the duo broke Italian records by having four songs on the Italian hit parade at the same time. The same year, they participated in the Sanremo Music Festival with the song "Felicità", and finished second. The song became widely popular, selling in over 6 million copies and receiving "German Golden Globe 1982". It appeared on their next album, Felicità (released as Aria pura in some territories), which was a chart success. The album was also recorded in Spanish and released as Felicidad. The duo would maintain the tradition of recording Spanish versions of their albums in the following years.

Al Bano and Romina released yet one more album in 1982, Che angelo sei, with another big hit "Tu, soltanto tu (Mi hai fatto innamorare)". Their 1983 compilation Amore mio was met with a great commercial success in German-speaking countries. In 1984, they won the Sanremo Music Festival with the song "Ci sarà" from their album Effetto amore, gathering over 2 million votes. In 1985, they participated in the Eurovision Song Contest for the second and final time, with the song "Magic Oh Magic" and, again, took the seventh place.

In 1986, Al Bano and Romina Power signed a contract with WEA and recorded the album Sempre sempre, which confirmed their international success. The song "Settembre" featured the voice of their baby daughter Cristel, while for "Lord Byron" they used recordings of Byron's poetry by Tyrone Power. In 1987, they participated in the Sanremo Festival with the song "Nostalgia canaglia" and came third. The album Libertà! was released in the same year. The couple's daughter Ylenia sang a duet with Romina in "Abbi fede". In 1988, the couple released the album Fragile, and the following year, took part in Sanremo Music Festival with the song "Cara terra mia", placing at the third position. The single was a minor chart hit in Italy.

In 1990, they released the album Fotografia di un momento, with the successful single "Donna per amore", followed by the Christmas album Weihnachten bei uns zu Hause released in Germany, which later appeared in Italy as Corriere di Natale. In 1991, Al Bano and Romina Power participated in the Sanremo Music Festival for the fifth and final time as a duo, this time around with the song "Oggi sposi", placing at the eighth position. In the same year, they celebrated 25 years of their joint artistic career and released two greatest hits anthologies: Le più belle canzoni (in Italy) and Vincerai (in Europe). They also wrote an autobiography and released a video, both entitled Autoritratto dalla A alla R.

Their daughter Ylenia Carrisi disappeared under mysterious circumstances in 1994 in New Orleans, which prompted Al Bano and Romina to withdraw from touring in order to dedicate themselves to the search for their daughter. Her case remains unsolved. In 1995, the couple released their last studio album together, Emozionale, followed by a video version, Una vita emozionale. In 1996, Al Bano participated solo in the Sanremo Music Festival, singing "È la mia vita", while Romina took part in the television mini-series The Return of Sandokan. Together, they released the compilation Ancora... Zugabe. In 1997, he released a solo album Concerto classico, and she published a book about her father, entitled Cercando mio padre in 1998.

In 1999, the couple separated. In an open letter to the weekly magazine Oggi, Al Bano explained the reasons for their break-up as related to the disappearance of their daughter. The two reunited in 2013, reportedly only on a professional basis, for a concert performance in Moscow (their first live performance together in sixteen years). They continued to perform live as a duo in 2014 and 2015, including at Sanremo 2015.

== Discography ==
=== Studio albums ===
Year	Title	Peak chart positions			
Year	Title	ITA	AUT	GER	NLD
1975	Atto I	—	—	—	—
1977	1978	—	—	—	—
1979	Aria pura	—	—	—	—
1982	Felicità	4	—	17	39
1982	Che angelo sei	—	—	34	—
1984	Effetto amore	—	—	—	—
1986	Sempre sempre	—	3	—	—
1987	Libertà!	—	10	35	—
1988	Fragile	—	28	53	—
1990	Fotografia di un momento	—	10	—	53
1990	Weihnachten bei uns zu Hause	—	—	—	—
1993	Notte e giorno	—	31	58	—
1995	Emozionale	—	13	62	—

=== Compilation albums ===
Year	Title	Peak chart positions			
Year	Title	AUT	FRA	GER	NLD
1976	Io con te	—	—	—	—
1976	Des nuits entières	—	—	—	—
1981	Cantan en español – Sharazan	—	—	—	—
1982	Ieri e oggi	—	—	—	—
1982	16 chanson 16 succès	—	23	—	—
1982	Al Bano e Romina Power	—	—	—	—
1982	Al Bano e Romina	—	—	—	—
1983	Collection	—	—	—	—
1983	Amore mio	6	—	3	37
1987	Romantica – Die großen Erfolge	—	—	—	—
1988	Felicità	—	—	—	—
1989	Al Bano & Romina Power	—	—	—	—
1989	Super 20	—	—	—	—
1991	Star Collection	—	—	—	—
1991	Le più belle canzoni	—	—	—	—
1991	Vincerai	27	—	24	—
1993	Che amici	—	—	—	—
1994	The Collection	—	—	—	—
1994	Sharazan	—	—	—	—
1994	Golden Stars International	—	—	—	—
1994	Golden Stars International Vol. 2	—	—	—	—
1995	Best Of	—	—	—	—
1996	Donna per amore	—	—	—	—
1996	Storia di due innamorati	—	—	—	—
1996	Ancora... Zugabe	—	—	—	—
1997	Prima notte d'amore	—	—	—	—
1997	Sentire ti amo	—	—	—	—
1997	Grandes exitos	—	—	—	—
1997	I grandi successi – Ihre grossen Erfolge	—	—	—	—
1998	I successi – Volume 1	—	—	—	—
1998	The Collection	—	—	—	—
2000	Collection	—	—	—	—
2002	Love Songs	—	—	—	—
2004	Największe przeboje	—	—	—	—
2005	Le più belle canzoni di Al Bano & Romina Power	—	—	—	—
2007	Italienische momente	—	—	—	—
2008	Le nostre emozioni	—	—	—	—
2011	Cantando in libertà... Le più belle canzoni	—	—	—	—
2012	Un'ora con...	—	—	—	—
2013	Vacanze Italiane	—	—	—	—
2015	The Very Best – Live aus Verona	71	—	82	—

=== Singles ===
Year	Title	Peak chart positions							Album
Year	Title	ITA	AUT	BEL	FRA	GER	NLD	SWI	Album
1970	"Storia di due innamorati"	7	—	—	—	—	—	—	A cavallo di due stili
1975	"Dialogo"	6	—	—	—	—	—	—	Atto I
1976	"We'll Live It All Again (Lo riviveri)"	—	—	—	2	—	—	—	1978
1976	"Des nuits entières"	—	—	—	3	—	—	—	Des nuits entières
1977	"Prima notte d'amore"	—	—	—	19	—	—	—	1978
1979	"Et je suis à toi"	—	—	—	—	—	—	—	—N/a
1979	"Aria pura"	—	—	—	—	—	—	—	Aria pura
1981	"Sharazan"	2	—	14	—	7	15	1	Felicità
1982	"Felicità"	1	9	7	10	6	18	3	Felicità
1982	"Tu, soltanto tu (Mi hai fatto innamorare)"	14	16	—	40	16	—	5	Che angelo sei
1982	"Che angelo sei (Amore mio)"	—	—	—	—	35	—	—	Che angelo sei
1984	"Ci sarà"	1	13	—	—	51	—	7	Effetto amore
1984	"Canzone blu"	—	—	—	—	57	—	—	Effetto amore
1984	"Al ritmo de beguine (Ti amo)"	—	—	—	—	—	—	—	Effetto amore
1985	"Magic Oh Magic"	—	—	—	—	—	—	—	—N/a
1986	"Sempre sempre"	47	3	—	—	33	—	—	Sempre sempre
1987	"Nostalgia canaglia"	4	—	—	—	—	—	—	Sempre sempre
1987	"Libertà!"	10	—	—	—	—	36	—	Libertà!
1988	"Makassar"	—	20	—	—	—	—	—	Libertà!
1988	"Fragile"	—	—	—	—	—	76	—	Fragile
1989	"Cara terra mia"	33	—	—	—	—	—	—	Fragile
1989	"Donna"	—	—	—	—	—	—	—	Fragile
1990	"Donna per amore"	—	21	—	—	—	52	—	Fotografia di un momento
1990	"Bussa ancora"	—	—	—	—	—	—	—	Fotografia di un momento
1990	"Fotografia"	—	—	—	—	—	—	—	Fotografia di un momento
1990	"Un altro Natale"	—	—	—	—	—	—	—	Weihnachten bei uns zu Hause
1991	"Oggi sposi"	8	—	—	—	—	—	—	Le più belle canzoni
1991	"Vincerai"	—	—	—	—	65	—	—	Vincerai
1993	"Domani, domani"	—	—	—	—	72	—	—	Notte e giorno
1993	"(Torneremo a) Venezia"	—	—	—	—	—	—	—	Notte e giorno
1993	"Sha-E-O"	—	—	—	—	—	—	—	Notte e giorno
1995	"Na na na"	—	—	—	—	—	—	—	Emozionale
1995	"Impossibile"	—	—	—	—	—	—	—	Emozionale
1996	"Anno 2000"	—	—	—	—	—	—	—	Ancora... Zugabe
1997	"Ma il cuore no"	—	—	—	—	—	—	—	Ancora... Zugabe

== Filmography ==
- Nel sole, directed by Aldo Grimaldi (1967)
- L'oro del mondo, directed by Aldo Grimaldi (1968)
- Il suo nome è Donna Rosa, directed by Ettore Maria Fizzarotti (1969)
- Pensando a te, directed by Aldo Grimaldi (1969)
- Mezzanotte d'amore, directed by Ettore Maria Fizzarotti (1970)
- Angeli senza paradiso, directed by Ettore Maria Fizzarotti (1970)
- Champagne in paradiso, directed by Aldo Grimaldi (1984)

Awards and achievements
Preceded by Wess and Dori Ghezzi with "Era"	Italy in the Eurovision Song Contest; 1976	Succeeded by Mia Martini with "Libera"
Preceded by Tiziana Rivale with "Sarà quel che sarà"	Sanremo Music Festival; Winner; 1984	Succeeded by Ricchi e Poveri with "Se m'innamoro"
Preceded by Alice and Franco Battiato with "I treni di Tozeur"	Italy in the Eurovision Song Contest; 1985	Succeeded by Umberto Tozzi and Raf with "Gente di mare"
