= Champagne in paradiso =

- Directed by: Aldo Grimaldi
- Written by: Albano Carrisi
- Produced by: Egidio Valentini
- Starring: Al Bano; Romina Power
- Cinematography: Cristiano Pogany; Enzo Falessi
- Edited by: Daniele Alabiso
- Music by: Albano Carrisi
- Release date: 1984
- Running time: 90 minutes
- Language: Italian

Champagne in paradiso (Italian for 'Champagne in Paradise') is a 1984 Italian musicarello comedy film directed by Aldo Grimaldi and starring Al Bano and Romina Power. It is the last film of the couple.

== Cast ==
- Romina Power as Paola Davis
- Albano Carrisi as Marco Allegri
- Renzo Montagnani as Don Giovanni
- Anna Mazzamauro as Cesarina/Tina
- Gigi Reder as The School Principal
- Francesca Romana Coluzzi as Miss Lorenza
- Edmund Purdom as Mr. Davis
- Gegia as Mamma
- Gianni Magni as The Major
- Ylenia Carrisi as Ylenia
- Yari Carrisi as Yari
