= Carisi =

Carisi is an Italian surname from Chioggia. Notable people with the surname include:

- Dominick Carisi Jr., fictional police detective, and later assistant district attorney, on Law & Order: Special Victims Unit
- John Carisi (1922–1992), American trumpeter and composer

== See also ==
- Carrisi
