= Stella stai =

Single by Umberto Tozzi

from the album Tozzi
- B-side: "Gabbie"
- Released: 1980
- Genre: Pop rock
- Length: 6:45
- Label: CGD
- Songwriters: Umberto Tozzi, Giancarlo Bigazzi

Umberto Tozzi singles chronology
"Gloria" (1979)	"Stella stai" (1980)	"Dimmi di no" (1980)

Audio
- "Stella stai" on YouTube

"Stella stai" (lit. 'Star, stay') is a 1980 song composed by Umberto Tozzi and Giancarlo Bigazzi and performed by Tozzi.

== Background ==
The song is the leading single of the 1980 album Tozzi. It is characterised by the frenetic series of on-beat cadences and by the use of truncated rhymes. Its style has been described as heavily influenced by disco, with strong rock overtones. Its ambiguous lyrics have been described as a "linguistic delirium" and have been variously interpreted.

The song has been included in the soundtrack of several films, notably Spider-Man: Far From Home and The Guest Room.

== Other versions ==
The song's spanish language version, "Claridad" with lyrics adapted by Óscar Gómez Díaz, has been covered, amongst others, by boy band Menudo and later Luis Fonsi. Thelma Houston recorded an English-language version of the song with the title "Shining Star". The song was also covered in Czech by Michal David with the title "Třetí Galaxie".

In 2019–20, Mina performed the song for a series of TIM commercials.

== Track listing ==
No.	Title	Length
1.	"Stella stai"	6:45
2.	"Gabbie"	6:05

== Charts ==
Chart (1980)	Peak position
Austria (Ö3 Austria Top 40)	18
Italy (Musica e dischi)	3
Spain (AFYVE)	3
Switzerland (Schweizer Hitparade)	3
West Germany (Media Control)	61

== Certifications ==
Region	Certification	Certified units/sales
Italy (FIMI) sales from 2009	Gold	50,000^{‡}
^{‡} Sales+streaming figures based on certification alone.
