= Felicità =

Single by Al Bano and Romina Power

from the album Felicità
- Released: 14 May 1982
- Recorded: 1982
- Genre: Pop
- Length: 3:13
- Label: Baby
- Songwriters: Cristiano Minellono; Dario Farina; Gino De Stefani
- Producer: Dario Farina

Al Bano and Romina Power singles chronology
"Sharazan" (1981)	"Felicità" (1982)	"Tu, soltanto tu (Mi hai fatto innamorare)" (1982)

"Felicità" (pronounced [felitʃiˈta]; Italian for "Happiness") is a song by Italian–American duo Al Bano and Romina Power, released in 1982. It was an international commercial success and remains arguably their best-known song.

== Song information ==
The duo participated with the track in the 1982 Sanremo Music Festival and finished second. The song was recorded in Munich in Giorgio Moroder's studio, with Gian Piero Reverberi serving as arranger. It appeared on their 1982 album Felicità (also known as Aria pura). The closing track from the album, "Arrivederci a Bahia", was released as the B side. For the Spanish release, both songs were re-recorded in Spanish, and the single received a different cover image.

"Felicità" was met with a great commercial success, topping Italian singles chart and eventually selling in millions of copies internationally in March–June 1982.

The song was performed by Laislavo 'Lado' Kravanja and Léa Seydoux at the end of the 2009 film Lourdes.

== Music video ==
The music video for the song was filmed in Leningrad, on the banks of Neva River. It pictures Albano Carrisi and Romina Power performing the song while driving a motorboat and sitting in a carriage. Romina and most extras wear historic costumes.

== Track listing and formats ==
- Italian 7-inch single

A. "Felicità" – 3:13
B. "Arrivederci a Bahia" – 3:02

== Charts ==
Weekly chart performance for "Felicità"
Chart (1982)	Peak position
Austria (Ö3 Austria Top 40)	9
Belgium (Ultratop 50 Flanders)	7
France (SNEP)	14
Italy (Musica e dischi)	1
Netherlands (Single Top 100)	18
Spain (AFYVE)	4
Switzerland (Schweizer Hitparade)	3
West Germany (GfK)	6

== Certifications ==
Region	Certification	Certified units/sales
Germany (BVMI)	Gold	300,000^{‡}
Italy (FIMI) certification for digital sales and streaming since January 2009	Gold	35,000^{‡}
^{‡} Sales+streaming figures based on certification alone.
