= Serenata (Toto Cutugno song) =

Single by Toto Cutugno

from the album Per amore o per gioco
- B-side: "Serenata (se la canti sarai felice) (Instrumental)"
- Released: February 1984
- Label: Baby
- Songwriter(s): Toto Cutugno; Vito Pallavicini

Toto Cutugno singles chronology
"L'italiano" (1983)	"Serenata" (1984)	"Mi piacerebbe... (andare al mare... al lunedì...)" (1985)

"Serenata" is a 1984 song written by Toto Cutugno and Vito Pallavicini. It placed second the 34th edition of the Sanremo Music Festival, gaining 1,042,864 votes.

== Track listing ==
- 7" single
1. "Serenata" (Cutugno, Pallavicini) 3:50
2. "Serenata (Se La Canti Sarai Felice) (Instrumental)" (Cutugno) 3:56

== Charts ==
Chart (1984)	Peak position
Italy (Musica e dischi)	5
Switzerland (Schweizer Hitparade)	12
West Germany (Media Control)	31
