= Il tempo se ne va =

1980 song

"Il Tempo Se Ne Va"

Single by Adriano Celentano
- Language: Italian
- English title: As time goes by
- B-side: "Non se ne parla nemmeno"
- Released: 1980
- Length: 3:50
- Label: Clan
- Songwriter(s): Toto Cutugno, Cristiano Minellono, Claudia Mori

Adriano Celentano singles chronology
| "Qua la mano" (1980) | "Il Tempo Se Ne Va" (1980) | "Innamorata, incavolata a vita" (1980) |

Audio
- "Il tempo se ne va" on YouTube

"Il tempo se ne va" is a song by Italian singer Adriano Celentano from his 1980 album Un po' artista un po' no. It was composed by Toto Cutugno (music), Cristiano Minellono and Claudia Mori (lyrics). The song is dedicated to Celentano's daughter Rosita.

== Background ==
The idea for the song came from Cristiano Minellono, who, with the collaboration of Celentano's wife Claudia Mori, crafted the lyrics on the basis of Celentano's relationship with his daughter Rosita, then 14 years old. Celentano was so emotionally affected by the lyrics that for years he chose not to perform it.

Celentano had initially planned to release the song only in Germany before deciding otherwise; he eventually recorded a German-language version of the song titled "Es bleibt die Zeit für keinen steh'n".

== Reception ==
The song spent three weeks at number two in Switzerland, prevented from rising higher by Lipps, Inc.'s "Funkytown".

The song has been considered "one of the most beautiful songs that deal with the theme of parenthood".

== Charts and certifications ==
=== Weekly charts ===
| Chart (1980) | Peak position |
|---|---|
| Italy (Musica e dischi) | 2 |
| Switzerland (Schweizer Hitparade) | 2 |

=== Certifications ===
| Region | Certification | Certified units/sales |
|---|---|---|
| Italy (FIMI) Sales since 2009 | Gold | 50,000^{‡} |
^{‡} Sales+streaming figures based on certification alone.
