= Ci sarà =

Single by Al Bano and Romina Power

from the album Effetto amore
- Released: 1984
- Genre: Pop
- Length: 3:30
- Label: Baby
- Songwriters: Cristiano Minellono, Dario Farina
- Producer: Dario Farina

Al Bano and Romina Power singles chronology
"Che angelo sei (Amore mio)" (1982)	"Ci sarà" (1984)	"Canzone blu" (1984)

"Ci sarà" (Italian for "There Will Be") is a song by Italian duo Al Bano and Romina Power, released in 1984. It was met with an international commercial success and remains one of their best-known hits.

The duo performed the song at the 1984 Sanremo Music Festival, and won gathering over 2 million votes. It was their second chart-topper in Italy, and another international hit. The duo also recorded a Spanish version of the track, called "Pasará".

== Music video ==
The music video for the song was filmed as part of the 1984 film Champagne in paradiso, directed by Aldo Grimaldi. It pictures Albano Carrisi and Romina Power performing the song at the seaside and in the forest.

== Track listing ==
- 7" Single

A. "Ci sarà" – 3:30
B. "Quando un amore se ne va" – 3:22

- Spanish 7" Single

A. "Pasará" – 3:23
B. "Ángeles" – 3:29

== Charts ==
Chart (1984)	Peak position
Austria (Ö3 Austria Top 40)	13
Italy (Musica e dischi)	2
Switzerland (Schweizer Hitparade)	7
Germany (GfK)	51
