= Soli (Adriano Celentano album) =

Studio album by Adriano Celentano
- Released: 1979
- Recorded: 1979
- Studios: Regson Studio, Milan
- Genres: Pop; disco; Italo disco
- Length: 36:31
- Languages: Italian; English
- Label: Clan Celentano
- Producer: Miki Del Prete

Adriano Celentano chronology
Geppo il folle (1978)	Soli (1979)	Me, live! (1979)

Singles from Soli
- 1. "Soli" Released: June 1979; 2. "Stivali e colbacco" Released: 1979 (France)

Professional ratings
Review scores
Source	Rating
AllMusic	4.5/5 stars

Soli is the nineteenth studio album by Italian singer Adriano Celentano, released in 1979 through his own label, Clan Celentano.

The album reached the second place in the Italian chart, and stayed in the top ten for twenty-four weeks. The title track from the album was also very popular, topping the Italian chart for five weeks in a row. The album was also released in many European countries, including France, Germany, Spain, and the USSR.

== Track listing ==
Side A
No.	Title	Writer(s)	Length
1.	"Soli"	Cristiano Minellono; Toto Cutugno	4:05
2.	"People"	Bob Merrill; Jule Styne	5:27
3.	"Pay, pay, pay"	Gianni Guarnieri; Michelle Vasseur; Vito Pallavicini	4:16
4.	"Io e te"	Minellono; Giuseppe di Stefano; Van Patterson	5:11

Side B
No.	Title	Writer(s)	Length
1.	"Amore no"	Minellono; Cutugno	5:10
2.	"Non è"	Minellono; Cutugno	4:17
3.	"Stivali e colbacco"	Eros Sciorilli; Fiorenzo Batacchi; Michele del Prete; Nicolaj Butrowsky	4:14
4.	"Medley"	Various	3:49

== Charts ==
Chart performance for Soli
Chart (1979)	Peak position
Italian Albums (Billboard)	2
Italian Albums (Musica e dischi)	2
