= Flavia Fortunato =

Italian singer, actress and television presenter

- Born: 16 March 1964 (age 62); Cosenza, Italy
- Occupations: Singer; Actress; Television presenter
- Years active: 1982-1992

Flavia Fortunato (born 16 March 1964) is an Italian singer, actress and television presenter. She was primarily associated with the Italo disco genre during the 1980s, and was a competitor in the Sanremo Music Festival.

== Life and career ==
Born in Cosenza, Fortunato studied dance and artistic gymnastics for ten years and performed artistic gymnastics at a competitive level, becoming a regional champion. She made her debut as a singer in 1982, with the single "Delirio". In 1983, she entered into the Sanremo Music Festival with the song "Casco blu", reaching the finals; the single peaked at number 11 on the Italian hit parade in 1983. The same year she debuted as a television presenter, hosting the RAI musical show Discoteca festival.

During the 1980s, Fortunato made regular appearances on television as a hostess as well as a musical guest in popular variety shows. She also entered the Sanremo Music Festival five more times between 1984 and 1992. In 1989 she made her acting debut on stage, starring alongside Lando Buzzanca in L'opera da tre soldi. In the 1990s, she focused on theatre and television, then she gradually moved away from show business to devote herself to her family.

Two greatest hits CD compilations, Flavia Fortunato and Canto Per Te, were respectively released in March 2000 and December 2010.

== Discography ==
Albums

- Flavia (1984)
- Verso il 2000 (1986)
- Nuovo Amore (1986)
- Canto Per Te (1987)
- Piccole danze (1990)
- Le donne chi sono (1991)
- Flavia Fortunato (2000) [Greatest Hits Compilation]
- Canto Per Te (2010) [Greatest Hits Compilation]

Singles

- "Delirio" (1982) - Italy #44
- "L'amore è" (1982)
- "Casco Blu / Promessa D'amore" (1983) - Italy #25
- "Rincontrarsi" (1983) - Italy #28
- "Aspettami Ogni Sera" (1984) - Italy #28
- "C'è una ragione" (1985) - Italy #46
- "Verso il 2000" (1986) - Italy #33
- "Nuovo Amore Mio" (1986) - Italy #45
- "Canto per te" (1987) - Italy #35
- "Una bella canzone" (1988)
- "Per niente al mondo" (1992) (with Franco Fasano) - Italy #12
