= Mario Castelnuovo =

Italian singer-songwriter and composer (born 1955)

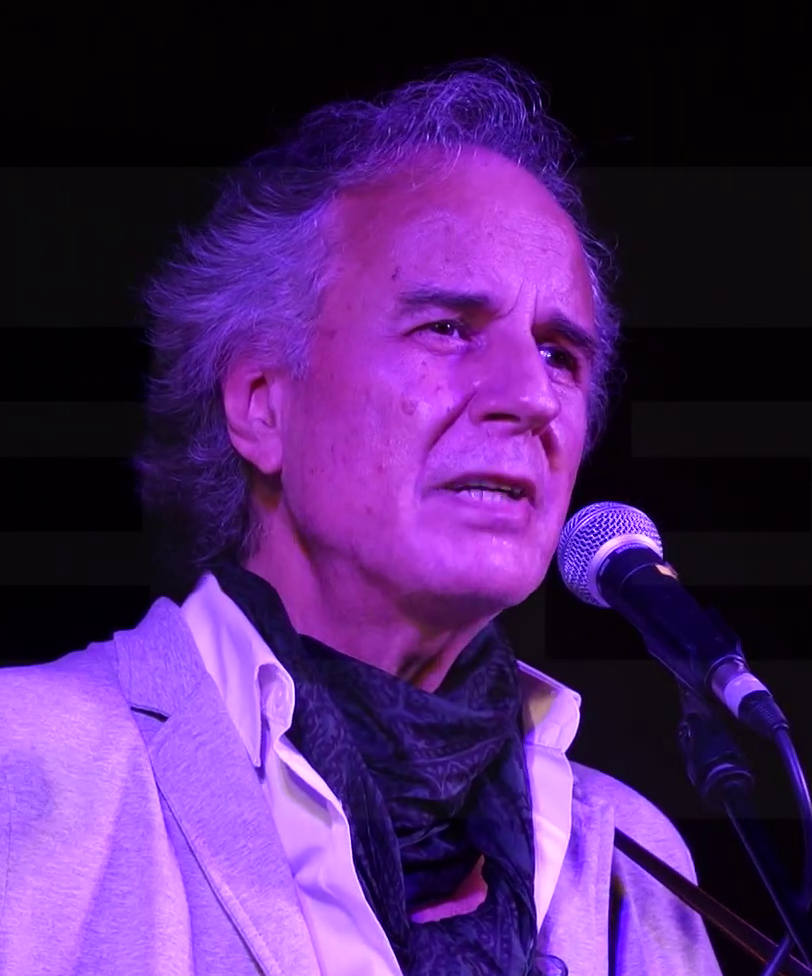
- Castelnuovo in 2021
- Born: 25 January 1955 (age 71); Rome, Italy
- Occupation: Singer-songwriter

Mario Castelnuovo (born 25 January 1955) is an Italian singer-songwriter and composer.

== Life and career ==
Born in Rome, after the diploma in surveying Castelnuovo studied French literature at the university, specializing in Provençal and Troubadour aesthetics. In the same period he started to play guitar and to attend the Folkstudio, a well-known Roman musical club. He started composing his first songs in the late 1970s, when was noted by singer-songwriter Amedeo Minghi, who started producing him and also earned him a contract with the label It.

Castelnuovo made his record debut with "Oceania", a single which won a selection organized by Domenica in that put up for grabs a place in the 32nd edition of the Sanremo Music Festival. He entered the competition with the song "Sette fili di canapa", the title track of his debut album, reaching the finals and getting large critical acclaim as well as some commercial success.

Castelnuovo's major hit was "Nina", a song which tells the story of his parents during the wartime; the song premiered at the 34th edition of the Sanremo Music Festival, placing sixth and subsequently peaking 10th on the Italian hit parade. In the following years Castelnuovo gradually moved away from the spotlight, still keeping to record critically acclaimed works.

Castelnuovo's style has been described as "characterized by an elegant mastery of melody, by an intimate and elegant atmosphere created by minimalist and refined lyrics and by a delicate and theatrical singing style". According to Enrico Deregibus' Dizionario completo della Canzone Italiana, his songs are "enchanting", especially because of their "fascinating and delicate writing, rich in literary references".

== Discography ==
Album

- 1982 - Sette fili di canapa ( IT / RCA Italiana )
- 1982 - Q Concert ( RCA Italiana ) (EP with Marco Ferradini and Goran Kuzminac)
- 1984 - Mario Castelnuovo ( RCA Italiana )
- 1985 - È piazza del Campo ( RCA Italiana )
- 1987 - Venere ( RCA Italiana )
- 1988 - Sul nido del cuculo ( RCA Italiana / BMG International )
- 1991 - Come sarà mio figlio ( RCA Italiana / BMG International ) (collection with three new songs)
- 1993 - Castelnuovo ( Fonit Cetra )
- 1996 - Signorine adorate ( DFV / Fonit Cetra )
- 2000 - Buongiorno( DFV / Fonit Cetra )
- 2005 - Com'erano venute buone le ciliegie nella primavera del '42 ( Rai Trade )
- 2014 - Musica per un incendio ( Rai Trade )
