= Si può dare di più =

Single by Umberto Tozzi, Gianni Morandi and Enrico Ruggeri
- B-side: "La canzone della verità"
- Released: February 1987
- Label: Ariola
- Songwriter(s): Giancarlo Bigazzi; Umberto Tozzi; Raf
- Producer(s): Giancarlo Bigazzi

Umberto Tozzi singles chronology
"Hurrah!" (1984)	"Si può dare di più" (1987)	"Gente di mare" (1987)

Gianni Morandi singles chronology
"Uno su mille" (1986)	"Si può dare di più" (1987)	"Tutti abbiamo una canzone" (1987)

Enrico Ruggeri singles chronology
"Rien ne va plus" (1986)	"Si può dare di più" (1987)	"Giorni randagi" (1988)

Music video
- "Si può dare di più" on YouTube

"Si può dare di più" (lit. 'One can give more') is a 1987 song composed by Giancarlo Bigazzi, Umberto Tozzi and Raf and performed by Tozzi with Gianni Morandi and Enrico Ruggeri. It won the 37th edition of the Sanremo Music Festival.

== Background ==
The song was composed by Bigazzi, Raf and Tozzi during a Christmas party at Caterina Caselli's house. Shortly later, Tozzi proposed the song to Morandi and Ruggeri, with whom he had developed a close friendship during the matches of the Nazionale Cantanti ("National Team of Singers", an amateur football team made up of musicians and playing charity games). The first demo of the song was recorded by a then-unknown Marco Masini.

The song won the Sanremo Festival and was a major commercial success, topping the Italian hit parade for seven weeks, but received a mixed response from critics.

== Track listing ==
No.	Title	Writer(s)	Length
1.	"Si può dare di più"	Giancarlo Bigazzi, Umberto Tozzi, Raf	4:25
2.	"La canzone della verità"	Enrico Ruggeri, Luigi Schiavone	4:12

== Charts ==
=== Weekly charts ===
Chart (1987)	Peak position
Italy (Musica e dischi)	1
Italy Airplay (Music & Media)	1
Switzerland (Schweizer Hitparade)	15
