= Loredana Lecciso =

Italian entertainer (born 1972)

Loredana Lecciso (born 26 August 1972) is an Italian entertainer. She is also known for appearances on tabloid talk shows. She became famous as the partner of celebrated Italian singer Albano Carrisi.

== Career ==
Her television career began in Lecce, at the local television station "Canale Otto".

In 2004 she was part of the cast of the first season of the reality show La Fattoria, the Italian version of The Farm. In the next months, with her twin Raffaella, she appeared as a dancer in shows such as Domenica In and I Raccomandati.

In 2005, she released her first music single "Si vive una volta sola" (literally We only live once) published by BMG Records. In 2006 this single was also released in Spain and in the Spanish speaking nations of South America with the title "Se vive una ves sola".

In October 2005 her partner Albano Carrisi was a contestant on L'Isola dei Famosi, the Italian version of Celebrity Survivor, when she announced their separation through an article in the Italian magazine Gente; Albano was notified of the decision during the weekly live broadcast of the show and decided to leave the show. Lecciso also was a contestant of this reality show, in the 2010 edition.

As a singer she recorded three singles:

- "Si vive una volta sola" (2005)
- "Tuka Kulos" (2007); this single was not sold commercially, but broadcast by radio stations and on the internet.
- "Se mi lasci non vale" (2009); a cover of a Julio Iglesias song.

== Private life ==
Lorendana Lecciso has been married to Fabio Cazzato from 1993 to 1996; she has a daughter from that marriage. In 1999 she started a relationship with Albano Carrisi, with whom she had a daughter and a son. They separated after several public frictions and then got back together after some time. She considers herself Roman Catholic.
