= Felicità (album) =

Studio album by Al Bano and Romina Power
- Released: 1982
- Genre: Pop
- Label: Baby
- Producer: Dario Farina

Al Bano and Romina Power chronology
Aria pura (1979)	Felicità (1982)	Che angelo sei (1982)

Felicità (Italian for Happiness) is a studio album by Italian–American duo Al Bano and Romina Power, released in 1982 by Baby Records. The album was an international commercial success and included two of their biggest hits, "Felicità" and "Sharazan".

In some territories, it was confusingly released under the title of their previous album, Aria pura, even though the two LPs contained different material. The duo also recorded a Spanish language version of the album, Felicidad.

== Track listing ==
=== Original Italian release ===
Side A

1. "Aria pura" – 3:12
2. "Felicità" – 3:13
3. "Prima notte d'amore" – 2:55
4. "Sharazan" – 4:45
5. "Il ballo del qua qua" – 2:52

Side B

1. "Angeli" – 3:25
2. "E fu subito amore" – 3:59
3. "Canto di libertà" – 2:45
4. "Caro Gesù" – 3:30
5. "Arrivederci a Bahia" – 3:02

=== Spanish release (Felicidad) ===
Side A

1. "Felicidad" – 3:13
2. "Nestra primera noche" – 2:55
3. "Canto de libertad" – 2:45
4. "Il ballo del qua qua" – 2:52
5. "Arrivederci en Bahia" – 3:02

Side B

1. "Aire puro" – 3:12
2. "Oye Jesús" – 3:30
3. "Vivirlo otra vez" – 3:59
4. "Angeles" – 3:25

== Charts ==
=== Weekly charts ===
Chart (1982)	Peak position
Dutch Albums (Album Top 100)	39
German Albums (Offizielle Top 100)	17

Chart (2025)	Peak position
Hungarian Physical Albums (MAHASZ)	25

=== Year-end charts ===
Chart (1982)	Position
German Albums (Offizielle Top 100)	52
