= Loredana Sciolla =

Italian sociologist (born 1947)

- Born: 10 November 1947 (age 78)
- Occupations: Sociologist, academic, and author

Academic background
- Education: University of Turin

Academic work
- Institutions: University of Turin

Loredana Sciolla is an Italian sociologist, academic, and author. She is a professor emeritus of sociology at the University of Turin.

Sciolla is most known for her works on the sociology of young people, socialization processes, personal and collective identity and civic culture. Among her authored works are her publications in academic journals, including Rassegna Italiana di Sociologia as well as books such as Senza Padri Né Maestri: Inchiesta Sugli Orientamenti Politici e Culturali Degli Studenti and Italiani. Stereotipi di Casa Nostra.

Sciolla has been a corresponding member of the Academy of Sciences of Turin since 2018 and was later appointed as a national resident member in 2024.

== Education ==
Sciolla earned her degree in Sociology of knowledge from the Faculty of Political Sciences at the University of Turin in 1971. Following this, she served as a CNR research fellow in the faculty of political science at the same institution until 1974.

== Career ==
Sciolla joined the University of Turin, where she held various appointments. She initially served as an assistant professor of sociology of knowledge from 1974 to 1985, followed by an appointment as an associate professor from 1985 to 1990. Between 1990 and 1993, she held the position of full professor of sociology of culture at the University of Florence. Returning to the University of Turin in 1993, she served as a full professor of sociology until 1998. During this period, she concurrently held the role of vice dean of the faculty of political science from 1993 to 1996. Additionally, she served as a full professor of sociology in the department of social sciences from 1998 to 2012, concurrently acting as the director of the department from 1998 to 2001. From 2012 to 2018, she was a full professor of sociology in the department of culture, politics, and society at the University of Turin, also serving as a member of the academic senate from 2012 to 2015. Since 2015, she has been serving as the director of the observatory on social change and cultural innovation as well as a professor emeritus of sociology at the same institution since 2018.

Sciolla served two terms as the director of the journal Rassegna Italiana di Sociologia, first from 1995 to 1998 and then from 2007 to 2009. She also held the position of vice-president of the "Associazione di politica e cultura il Mulino" from 2009 to 2011.

== Works ==
Sciolla has authored books throughout her career. In 1980, she authored the book Senza Padri né Maestri: Inchiesta Sugli Orientamenti Politici e Culturali Degli Studenti. The book explored the political and cultural beliefs, values, and orientations of students, particularly in the absence of traditional authority figures such as fathers and teachers. Her 1983 book titled Identità: Percorsi di Analisi in Sociologia examined sociological perspectives and methodologies regarding the construction, perception, and societal influences on identity. In related research, her 2004 publication La Sfida dei Valori: Rispetto Delle Regole e Rispetto Dei Diritti in Italia investigated the shifts in civic values in Italy over the past twenty years, comparing them with other Western nations, noting Italy's rapid growth alongside its more traditional, less secularized, and more dogmatic values. In her assessment of the evolving dynamics of socialization in Western culture, her 2006 publication La Socializzazione Flessibile critiqued traditional authoritarian approaches while examining the challenges and new methods of transmitting values to young people across various social contexts, and challenging stereotypes about youth behaviour. Moreover, in her 2020 publication titled Italiani. Stereotipi di Casa Nostra, she explored the stereotypes surrounding Italian familial attachment, societal solidarity, and civic sense. Through this book, she presented ideas that challenged conventional wisdom, providing an understanding of the interplay between familial ties, societal values, and individual identities in Italian culture.

Sciolla directed for the Institute of the Enciclopedia Italiana Treccani the work in 4 volumes L'Italia e le Sue Regioni (Roma 2015), with M. Salvati, and the work, Europa. Culture e Società (Roma 2018), with M. Lazar and M. Salvati.

== Awards and honours ==
- 2020 – Honorary Member, Italian Sociological Association

== Selected publications ==
=== Books ===
- Identità : percorsi di analisi in sociologia (1983) ISBN 9788870111798
- La socializzazione flessibile. Identità e trasmissione dei valori tra i giovani (2006) ISBN 9788815112767
- L’identità a più dimensioni. Il soggetto e la trasformazione dei legami sociali (2010) ISBN 9788823015432
- Italiani. Stereotipi di casa nostra (2020) ISBN 9788855262934
- I valori dell'Europa (editor) (2021). ISBN 9788812008988

=== Articles ===
- Sciolla, L. (1983). Differenziazione simbolica e identità. Rassegna italiana di sociologia, 1, 41–77.
- Sciolla, L. (1990). Identità e mutamento culturale nella Italia di oggi. In La cultura dell'Italia contemporanea (pp. 35–69). Edizioni della Fondazione Giovanni Agnelli.
- Sciolla, L. (1995). La dimensione dimenticata dell'identità. Rassegna Italiana di Sociologia, 1, 41–52.
- Sciolla, L. (2000). Riconoscimento e teoria dell’identità. In D. della Porta, M. Greco, & A. Szakolczai (Eds.), Identità, riconoscimento, scambio (pp. 5–29). Roma-Bari: Laterza. ISBN 9788842060642.
- Sciolla, L. (2003). Quale capitale sociale? Partecipazione associativa, fiducia e spirito civico. Rassegna Italiana di Sociologia, 2, 287–289.
- Sciolla, L. (2005). Razionalità e identità nella spiegazione dei valori. In La spiegazione sociologica. Metodi, tendenze, problemi (pp. 235–253). Il Mulino.
- Sciolla, L. (2008). La forza dei valori. Rassegna Italiana di Sociologia, n.1, 89–115.
- Sciolla, L. (2008). "Déception et participation politique des jeunes". In A. Cavalli, V. Cicchelli, & O. Galland (Eds.), Deux pays deux jeunesses ? La condition juvénile en France et en Italie (pp. 141–150). Presses Universitaires de Rennes. ISBN 978-2-7535-0744-9
- Sciolla, L. (2013). "Quando sono le istituzioni a generare sfiducia". Sistemi intelligenti, 1, 164–173.
- Sciolla, L., (2021). "Volunteering and Trust. New Insights on a Classical Topic" (with L. Maraviglia and J. Wilson). In R. Guidi, K. Fonović, & T. Cappadozzi (Eds.), Accounting for the Varieties of Volunteering (pp. 267–286). Springer. ISBN 978-3-030-70548-0
- Sciolla, L., (2023). "Ritrovare la società Oltre la dicotomia individuo società". Quaderni di Teoria Sociale, 1(2), 55–70.
