= Soli (Adriano Celentano song) =

1979 song

Single by Adriano Celentano
- B-side: "Io e te"
- Released: 23 April 1979
- Length: 4:03
- Label: Clan
- Songwriter(s): Toto Cutugno, Cristiano Minellono

Adriano Celentano singles chronology
"Che cosa ti farei" (1979)	"Soli" (1979)	"Qua la mano" (1980)

Audio
- "Soli" on YouTube

"Soli" is a song by Italian singer Adriano Celentano from his eponymous 1979 album Soli. As many songs on that album, it was written by Toto Cutugno.

== Overview ==
"Soli" marked the beginning of Celentano's collaboration with songwriting duo Toto Cutugno and Cristiano Minellono.

While being a love song, its lyrics subtly address the socio-political situation of the time, as it portrays a couple in love who prefer to seclude themselves in their home and isolate themselves from a violent and unstable society. Celentano premiered the song during an episode of the Walter Chiari's RAI television show Una valigia tutta blu.

== Charts ==
Chart (1979–80)	Peak position
Italy (Musica e dischi)	1
