= Angeli senza paradiso =

1970 film

- Directed by: Ettore Maria Fizzarotti
- Written by: Giovanni Grimaldi
- Starring: Romina Power; Al Bano
- Cinematography: Mario Capriotti
- Music by: Angelo Francesco Lavagnino; Franz Schubert
- Release date: 1970
- Country: Italy
- Language: Italian

Angeli senza paradiso ("Angels without Paradise") is a 1970 Italian musicarello romance film directed by Ettore Maria Fizzarotti. It is an unofficial remake of the 1933 film Gently My Songs Entreat by Willi Forst.

== Cast ==
- Al Bano as Franz Schubert
- Romina Power as Anna Roskoff
- Agostina Belli as Marta
- Paul Müller as Hermann Fux
- Cinzia De Carolis as Irina Roskoff
- Wolf Fischer as Baron Ludwig
- Caterina Boratto as Princess Vorokin
- Gérard Herter as count Roskoff
- Renato Malavasi as Schultz
- Edoardo Toniolo as school director
- Emma Baron as mother of Martha
- Franco Carrisi as Karl
