= Sanremo Music Festival 1984 =

Italian song contest (34th edition)

Dates and venue
- Semi-final 1: 2 February 1984
- Semi-final 2: 3 February 1984
- Final: 4 February 1984
- Venue: Teatro Ariston; Sanremo, Italy

Organisation
- Broadcaster: Radiotelevisione italiana (RAI)
- Presenters: Pippo Baudo and Iris Peynado, Elisabetta Gardini, Tiziana Pini, Edy Angelillo

Big Artists section
- Number of entries: 20
- Winner: "Ci sarà" Al Bano and Romina Power

Newcomers' section
- Number of entries: 16
- Winner: "Terra promessa" Eros Ramazzotti

The Sanremo Music Festival 1984 (Italian: Festival di Sanremo 1984), officially the 34th Italian Song Festival (34º Festival della canzone italiana), was the 34th annual Sanremo Music Festival, held at the Teatro Ariston in Sanremo between 2 and 4 February 1984 and broadcast by Radiotelevisione italiana (RAI). The show was presented by Pippo Baudo, who also served as the artistic director, assisted by Iris Peynado, Elisabetta Gardini, Tiziana Pini and Edy Angelillo.

The winners of the Big Artists section were Al Bano and Romina Power with the song "Ci sarà", while Patty Pravo won the Critics Award with "Per una bambola". Eros Ramazzotti won the Newcomers section, held for the first time this year, with the song "Terra promessa".

"Favola triste", sung by Silvia Conti, was disqualified because it had been published earlier. It was replaced with the song "Pomeriggio a Marrakech", sung by the duo I Trilli. Loretta Goggi, which was supposed to participate with the song "Un amore grande", withdrew last minute and was replaced by Pupo, who eventually ranked fourth.

== Participants and results ==
=== Big Artists ===
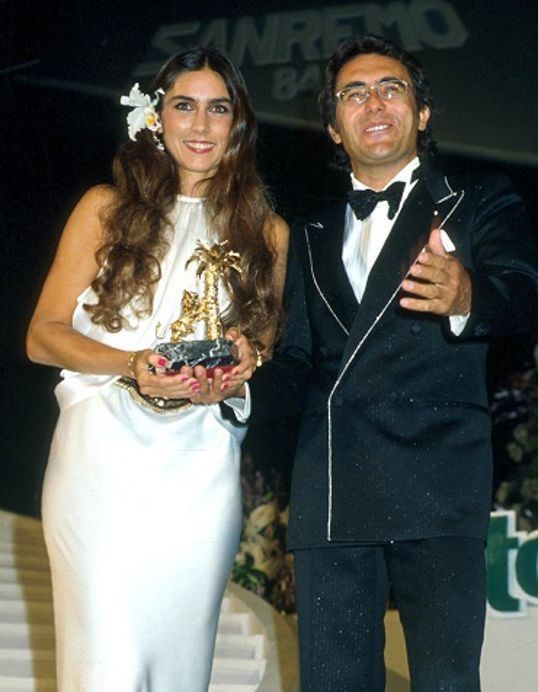
Al Bano and Romina Power upon their victory

Big Artists section
| Song | Artist(s) | Songwriter(s) | Rank |
|---|---|---|---|
| "Ci sarà" | Al Bano and Romina Power | Cristiano Minellono; Dario Farina | 1 |
| "Serenata" | Toto Cutugno | Toto Cutugno; Vito Pallavicini | 2 |
| "Cara" | Christian | Mario Balducci | 3 |
| "Un amore grande" | Pupo | Totò Savio; Giancarlo Bigazzi; Umberto Tozzi | 4 |
| "Non voglio mica la luna" | Fiordaliso | Enzo Malepasso; Luigi Albertelli; Zucchero Fornaciari | 5 |
| "Nina" | Mario Castelnuovo | Mario Castelnuovo | 6 |
| "Non scendo" | Anna Oxa | Oscar Avogadro; Mario Lavezzi | 7 |
| "Regalami un sorriso" | Drupi | Adelio Cogliati; Drupi; Franco Fasano | 8 |
| "Chi (mi darà)" | Iva Zanicchi | Umberto Balsamo; Cristiano Malgioglio | 9 |
| "Per una bambola" | Patty Pravo | Maurizio Monti | 10 / Critics Award |
| "Anni ruggenti" | Gruppo Italiano | Patrizia Di Malta; Raffaella Riva; Gigi Folino; Chicco Santulli | 11 |
| "Ancora ti vorrei" | Bobby Solo | Roberto Satti; Susuki; Manrico Mologni | 12 |
| "Libera" | Donatella Milani | Donatella Milani; Mirko Filistrucchi; Raimondo Putzolu | 13 |
| "Come si cambia" | Fiorella Mannoia | Maurizio Piccoli; Renato Pareti | 14 |
| "Amore amore" | Marisa Sannia | Daniele Pace; Corrado Conti | 15 |
| "La bottega del caffè" | Alberto Camerini | Alberto Camerini | 16 |
| "Serena alienazione" | Riccardo Del Turco | Mogol; Riccardo Del Turco | 17 |
| "Radioclima" | Garbo | Garbo | 18 |
| "Nuovo swing" | Enrico Ruggeri | Enrico Ruggeri | 19 |
| "Allo stadio" | Stadio | Luca Carboni; Gaetano Curreri | 20 |

=== Newcomers ===
Newcomers section
| Song | Artist(s) | Songwriter(s) | Rank |
|---|---|---|---|
| "Terra promessa" | Eros Ramazzotti | Eros Ramazzotti; Alberto Salerno; Renato Brioschi | 1 |
| "Solo con l'anima mia" | Marco Armani | Rosalino Cellamare; Luca Carboni | 2 |
| "Aspettami ogni sera" | Flavia Fortunato | Elio Palumbo; Vania Magelli; Lazzari; Sebastiani | 3 |
| "Sonnambulismo" | Canton | Luigi Schiavone; Enrico Ruggeri | 4 |
| "Notte di luna" | Valentino | Sergio Basile | 5 |
| "Principessa delle rose" | Ivano Calcagno | Ivano Calcagno | 6 |
| "Lei balla sola" | Fabio Vanni | Franca Poli; Elisabetta Paselli | 7 |
| "Walkin'" | Dhuo | Mike Loghan; Bruno Bergonzi | 8 |
| "Acqua alta in piazza San Marco" | Giampiero Artegiani | Giampiero Artegiani; Marcello Marrocchi | Eliminated |
| "La Fenice" | Santandrea | Riccardo Cocciante; Santandrea | Eliminated / Critics Award |
| "I'm in Love With You" | Luigi Sutera | Luigi Sutera | Eliminated |
| "Madame" | Rodolfo Banchelli | Rodolfo Banchelli; Angelo Valsiglio; D'Apruzzo | Eliminated |
| "Mondorama" | Richter, Venturi & Murru | Marcello Murru; Liliana Ritteri; Varo Venturi | Eliminated |
| "Pomeriggio a Marrakech" | I Trilli | Gian Piero Reverberi; Giuseppe Zullo; Michele Maisano; Roberto Della Casa | Eliminated |
| "Quanto ti amo" | Collage | Paolo Amerigo Cassella; Dario Farina | Eliminated |
| "Se ti spogli" | Giorgia Fiorio | Sergio Menegale; Renato Pareti | Eliminated |

== Guests ==
Guests
| Artist(s) | Song(s) |
|---|---|
| Claudio Villa | "Un amore così grande" |
| Queen | "Radio Ga Ga" |
| Pippo Franco | "Pinocchio chiò" |
| Paul Young | "Love of the Common People" |
| Culture Club | "Victims" |
| Bonnie Tyler | "Total Eclipse of the Heart" |
| Bonnie Bianco & Pierre Cosso | "Stay" |
| David Knopfler | "Soul Kissing" |
| Randy Crawford | "Why" |
| José Luis Rodríguez | "Due come noi" |
| Stephen Schlaks | "Europe" |
| Gilbert Montagné | "Just For Tonight" |

== Broadcasts ==
=== Local broadcasts ===
All shows were broadcast on Rai Uno and in radio stations RadioUno and RaiStereoUno beginning at 20:30 CET.

=== International broadcasts ===
Known details on the broadcasts in each country, including the specific broadcasting stations and commentators are shown in the tables below.

International broadcasters of the Sanremo Music Festival 1984
| Country | Broadcaster | Channel(s) | Commentator(s) | Ref(s) |
|---|---|---|---|---|
| Australia | Network 0–28 (Note: Delayed broadcast on 29 April at 21:30 (AEST)) | | | |
| Colombia | Inravisión | Cadena 2 (Note: Delayed broadcast on 1 May 1985 at 13:00 (CST)) | | |
| East Germany | DFF | DFF1 (Note: Delayed in a shortened format on 30 May 1984 at 20:35 (CET)) | | |
