= Ylenia Carrisi =

Italian who disappeared in New Orleans

- Carrisi in 1989, in the backstage of the TV program La ruota della fortuna
- Born: Ylenia Maria Sole Carrisi; November 29, 1970; Rome, Italy
- Disappeared: January 6, 1994 (aged 23); New Orleans, Louisiana, U.S.
- Status: Missing for 32 years, 7 months and 13 days Declared dead in absentia in December 2014
- Height: 5 ft 9 in (1.75 m)
- Parents: Albano Carrisi (father); Romina Power (mother)
- Relatives: Tyrone Power (maternal grandfather; see for more relatives); Linda Christian (maternal grandmother; see for more relatives)

Ylenia Maria Sole Carrisi (born November 29, 1970 – missing since January 6, 1994) was an Italian-American woman who disappeared under mysterious circumstances while visiting New Orleans, Louisiana, in January 1994, and was declared presumed dead in December 2014 upon her father's request.

She was eldest daughter of Italian–American performers Albano Carrisi and Romina Power.

== Early life ==
Carrisi was born in Rome on November 29, 1970, the eldest daughter of Albano Carrisi and Romina Power, an Italian–American couple of singers and actors who primarily performed as a duo. Her maternal grandparents are American actor Tyrone Power and Mexican actress Linda Christian.

In 1983, she appeared with her parents in the film Champagne in paradiso. In 1989, she was a letter-turner on La ruota della fortuna, the Italian version of Wheel of Fortune. She planned to become a novelist, and studied literature at King's College London, where she received the highest marks in her year.

== Disappearance ==
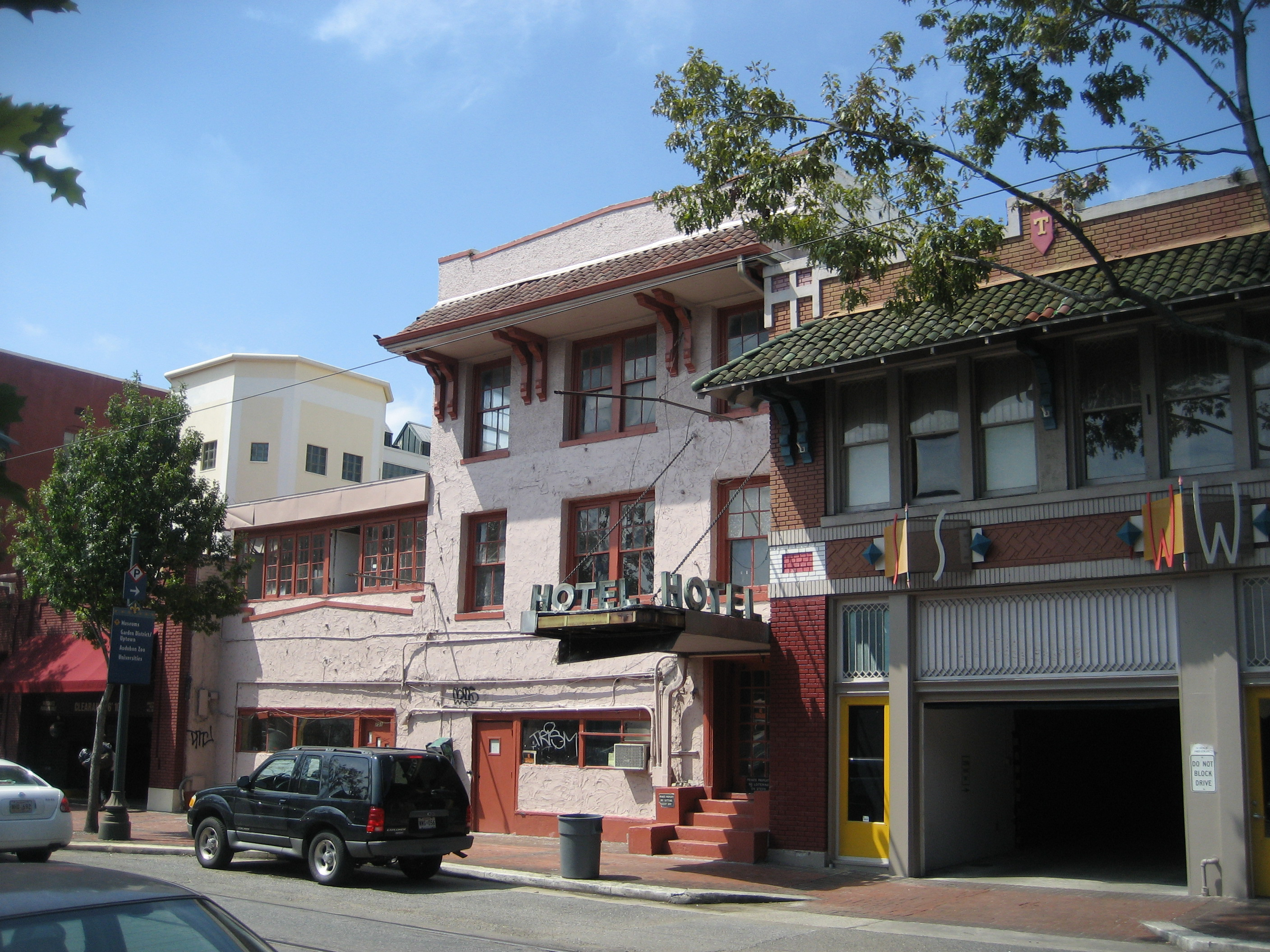
The LeDale Hotel on St. Charles Avenue, New Orleans, where Carrisi was staying at the time of her disappearance

During her studies, she began to entertain the idea of travelling the world solo with nothing but a backpack and her journal. She decided to take a break from studying and returned to Italy, where she sold all her belongings in order to pay for the voyage. She began in Central America. After having spent a few months in Belize, she decided to leave the day after Christmas 1993 by bus to New Orleans, Louisiana. Her brother Yari, also an experienced traveler, had decided to surprise his sister by visiting her that Christmas. He arrived on a rainy December 27 in the Belizean village of Hopkins, going door-to-door searching for her, only to discover that the previous day she had boarded a bus to New Orleans.

Carrisi was last seen in the French Quarter area of New Orleans, around January 6. Police efforts to find her did not yield any result. At the time of her disappearance, she was staying in the LeDale Hotel with Alexander Masakela, a street musician twenty years her senior. Masakela was arrested on January 31 on an unrelated charge but eventually released for lack of evidence to connect him to Carrisi's disappearance.

In relation to her disappearance, a security guard testified that he saw a woman vaguely matching her description jump into the Mississippi River saying the words "I belong in water". A Coast Guard search turned up no sign of the young woman's body, which may have been washed out to sea. In any case, it has never been established that the person was Carrisi. In 1996, two years after her disappearance, an unidentified caller claimed that Carrisi was still alive but her whereabouts were unknown.

Carrisi's parents last heard from their daughter on New Year's Eve 1993. They reported her missing on January 18, 1994. Her mother believes that she is still alive. In November 2006, her father Albano stated for the first time that he believed the security guard's story about the woman jumping into the Mississippi River, and that the woman was his daughter. In January 2013, Albano filed a request for an official declaration of the death of his daughter.

In June 2008, the German weekly Freizeit Revue reported that Ylenia was living in a convent in Arizona, the US state where her mother owns a home. Her father dismissed the report as "shameful speculation containing not a bit of truth".

== See also ==
- List of people who disappeared mysteriously (1990s)
