= Umberto Tozzi =

Italian musician (born 1952)

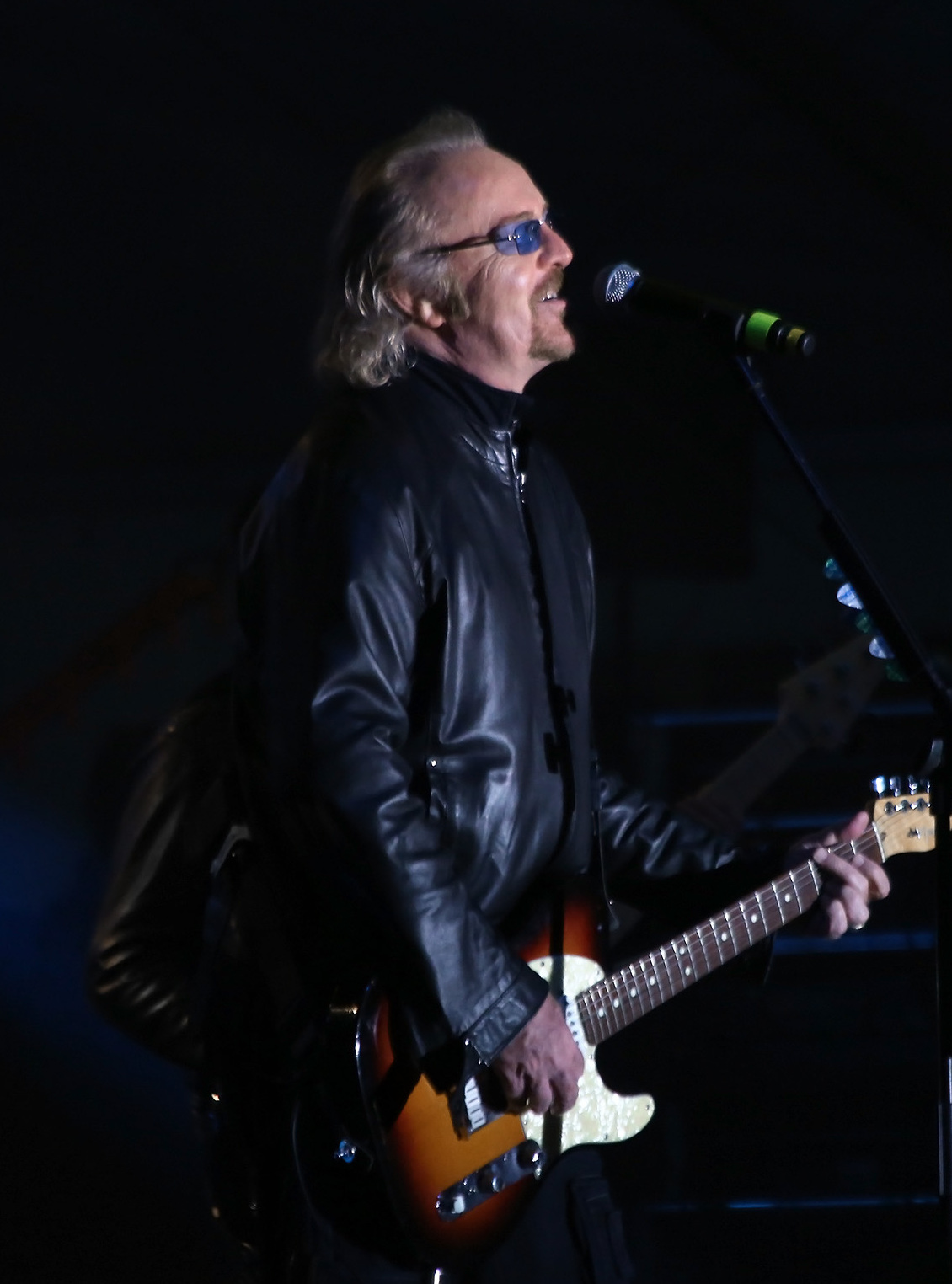
- Tozzi performing in 2014

Background information
- Born: Umberto Antonio Tozzi; 4 March 1952 (age 74); Turin, Piedmont, Italy
- Genres: Pop; rock; italo disco
- Occupations: Singer; songwriter; composer; record producer
- Instruments: Vocals; keyboard; guitar
- Years active: 1968–present
- Formerly of: Off Sound
- Website: umbertotozzi.com

Umberto Antonio Tozzi (pronounced [umˈbɛrto anˈtɔːnjo ˈtɔttsi]; born 4 March 1952) is an Italian pop and rock singer and songwriter. Throughout his career, he has sold over 70 million records in different languages internationally. His biggest international hits are: "Stella Stai", "Gloria", "Tu" and "Ti Amo".

== Biography ==
Tozzi was born on 4 March 1952 in Turin, Italy. He is the second son of Nicola Tozzi, a police officer originally from Vico del Gargano, and Immacolata from Montesarchio. They moved to Turin in 1945.

In 1968, at the age of 16, Umberto Tozzi joined 'Off Sound', one of the many groups that performed in small venues around Turin. In Milan, he met Adriano Pappalardo, with whom he formed a 13-piece band and began a large-scale Italian tour.

In 1974, Tozzi had his first success as a songwriter, with the song "Un Corpo, un'anima" ("One Body, One Soul"), co-written with Damiano Dattoli and performed by Wess and Dori Ghezzi. It appeared on Canzonissima, an Italian music programme running from 1956 to 1974.

In 1976, he released his first album, Donna Amante Mia ("Woman, My Lover"), which contained the single "Io Camminerò" ("I Will Walk"), which was sung with great success by Fausto Leali. In 1977, "Ti Amo", one of Tozzi's most famous songs, was released. It stayed at number one on the Italian song charts for seven months and went on to become an international success throughout continental Europe. It also achieved decent success in the Americas and Australia, primarily in nightclubs. The single was awarded a gold record award in Australia, despite the fact that it only made number 25 on the charts there in late 1979. In 1978 he released Tu, another hit in Italy, and held an Australian tour, which was organized by the Italo-Australian promoter Duane Zigliotto and concluded at the Sydney Opera House with two full house concerts.

The following year Tozzi recorded one of his most famous songs, "Gloria", which became a major hit in Italy in 1979 and 1980. Jonathan King wrote English lyrics for the song, which became popular in the UK as well in 1979, and was sung and recorded by the English singer Elkie Brooks in 1980. A cover version of the song by the American singer Laura Branigan in 1982 caused the song to grow in popularity in the US as well. Branigan worked with the arranger and keyboardist of Tozzi's own version, Greg Mathieson, to give the song what she called "an American kick." The song reached the top of the charts, reached gold and platinum status in several countries, and stayed on the US pop charts for 36 weeks.

By late 1980 he released "Stella Stai", another one of his major hits. In the early 1980s, he released a studio album called Tozzi, and his first live album In Concerto which he recorded at a concert with a band of American musicians. Soon after, the Latin Group Menudo recorded the Spanish version of "Stella Stai", entitled "Claridad", which made it one of the highest-selling records in the whole of Latin America.

After a period of absence from the music scene, Tozzi returned in 1987 and won the Sanremo Music Festival with the song "Si Può Dare Di Più" ("More can be given"), which he sang with Gianni Morandi and Enrico Ruggeri. In 1987 he also released "Gente Di Mare" ("People of the Sea"), which he performed with Raf at Eurovision, and won third place. In 1988, Tozzi released his second live album, The Royal Albert Hall.

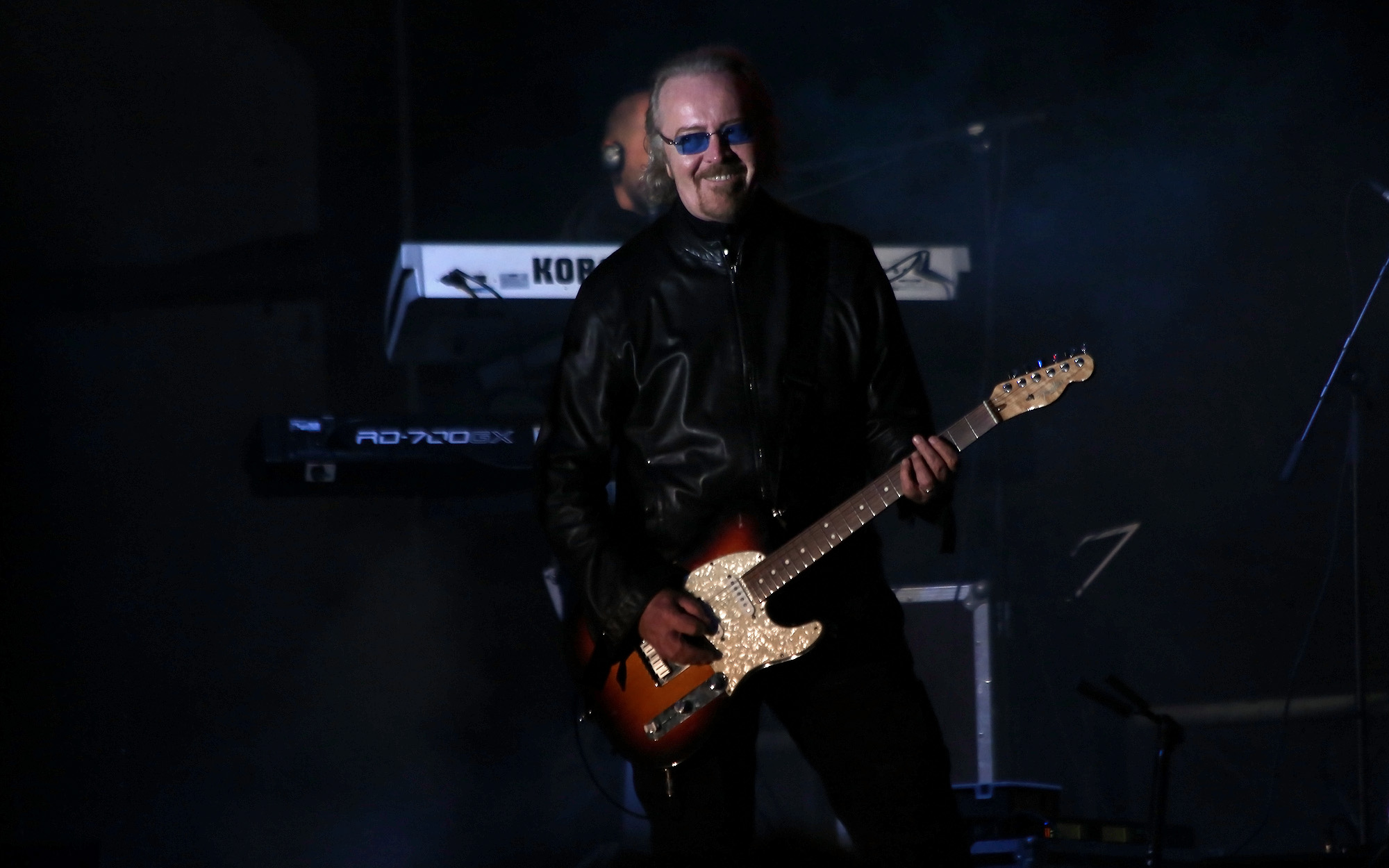
Tozzi in 2014

In the 1990s, Tozzi recorded several more songs such as "Gli Altri Siamo Noi" ("We Are the Others"), the album Equivocando ("Misunderstanding"), Il Grido ("The Outcry") and Aria e Cielo ("Air and Sky"). He also released a greatest hits compilation, Le Mie Canzoni ("My Songs").

In 2000 and 2005, he performed "Un'altra Vita" ("Another Life") and "Le Parole" ("The Words") at the Sanremo Music Festival. Between the two events, he also released a duet with the French singer Lena Ka of his classic "Ti Amo" as "Ti Amo (Rien Que des Mots)". Tozzi released another greatest hits compilation, a 2-disc set entitled The Best of, and another single, "E Non Volo". In January 2009 he released the single "Cerco ancora te", composed by Emilio Munda and Matteo Gaggioli.

In 2013, his re-edited version of "Gloria", sung in its original Italian, was placed by Martin Scorsese onto the soundtrack of the 2014 Academy Award nominated blockbuster, The Wolf of Wall Street.

Throughout his career, Tozzi has sold over 70 million records in different languages internationally.

== Discography ==
Studio albums

- 1976 - Donna amante mia
- 1977 - E' nell'aria...ti amo
- 1978 - Tu
- 1979 - Gloria
- 1980 - Tozzi
- 1981 - Notte rosa
- 1982 - Eva
- 1984 - Hurrah!
- 1987 - Invisibile
- 1991 - Gli altri siamo noi
- 1994 - Equivocando
- 1996 - Il grido
- 1997 - Aria & cielo
- 2000 - Un'altra vita
- 2005 - Le parole
- 2006 - Heterogene
- 2012 - Yesterday, Today
- 2015 - Ma che spettacolo

Greatest hits albums

- 1987 - Minuti di un'eternità
- 1989 - Nell'aria c'è
- 1991 - Le mie canzoni
- 1999 - Bagaglio a mano
- 2002 - The best of Umberto Tozzi
- 2006 - Tozzi Masini
- 2009 - Superstar
- 2013 - Collection:Umberto Tozzi
- 2018 - The best of Umberto Tozzi
- 2018 - Raf Tozzi

Live albums

- 1980 - In concerto
- 1988 - Royal Albert Hall
- 2009 - Non solo live
- 2017 - Quarant'anni che ti amo
- 2017 - Quarant'anni che ti amo in Arena
- 2019 - Due, la nostra storia

== Notes ==
Awards and achievements
Preceded by Eros Ramazzotti with "Adesso tu"	Sanremo Music Festival; Winner; 1987	Succeeded by Massimo Ranieri with "Perdere l'amore"
Preceded by Al Bano and Romina Power	Italy in the Eurovision Song Contest; 1987 (with Raf)	Succeeded by Luca Barbarossa
