= Toto Cutugno =

Italian musician (1943–2023)

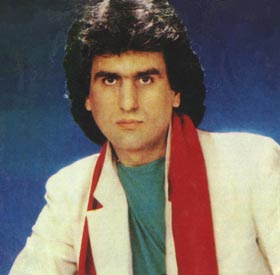
- Cutugno in the early 1970s

Background information
- Born: Salvatore Cutugno; 7 July 1943; Fosdinovo, Tuscany, Kingdom of Italy
- Died: 22 August 2023 (aged 80) Milan, Lombardy, Italy
- Occupations: Singer-songwriter; instrumentalist; television presenter
- Instruments: Vocals; piano; guitar; drums; saxophone; melodica
- Years active: 1966–2023
- Formerly of: Albatros

Salvatore "Toto" Cutugno (Italian: [ˈtɔːto kuˈtuɲɲo]; 7 July 1943 – 22 August 2023) was an Italian pop singer-songwriter, musician, and television presenter. He was best known for his worldwide hit song, "L'Italiano", released on his 1983 album of the same title. Cutugno also won the Eurovision Song Contest 1990 held in Zagreb, SFR Yugoslavia, with the song "Insieme: 1992", for which he wrote both the lyrics and music. He has been described as "one of the most popular singers in Italy and a symbol of Italian melody abroad", as well as "one of the most popular Italian performers on a global scale" and "one of the most successful Italian songwriters of all time", selling over 100 million records worldwide.

== Early life ==
Toto Cutugno was born on 7 July 1943 in Tendola, a borough of Fosdinovo, Lunigiana, Tuscany, to a Sicilian sea marshal father from Barcellona Pozzo di Gotto and a housewife mother from Tuscany. Shortly after his birth the family moved to the nearby city of La Spezia, Liguria.

== Career ==
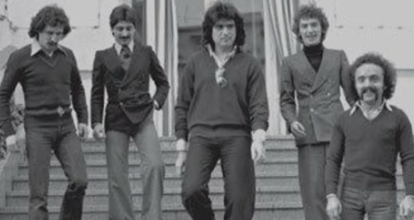
Cutugno (center) with Albatros

Cutugno began his musical career as a drummer, and at 19 he founded his first band, Toto e i Tati. He later formed the disco band Albatros together with Lino Losito and Mario Limongelli. He also started a career as a songwriter, contributing some of French-American singer Joe Dassin most well-known songs such as "L'été indien", "Et si tu n'existais pas", and "Le Jardin du Luxembourg" (written with Vito Pallavicini). He also co-wrote Dalida's "Monday, Tuesday... Laissez-moi danser" ("Voglio l'anima" in its Italian version), which achieved Platinum record status shortly after being released, as well as songs for Johnny Hallyday, Mireille Mathieu, Ornella Vanoni, Domenico Modugno, Claude François, Gigliola Cinquetti, Gérard Lenorman, Michel Sardou, Hervé Vilard, and Paul Mauriat.

In 1976, Albatros participated for the first time in the Sanremo Music Festival finishing in third place with the song "Volo AZ 504". Following another chart success with the song "Santamaria de Portugal", in 1978 Cutugno left Albatros to concentrate on his solo career. The same year he had his first solo hit with "Donna donna mia", the opening song of the Mike Bongiorno's RAI TV show Scommettiamo?. In 1979, he wrote Adriano Celentano's number one hit "Soli".

In 1980, Cutugno returned to the Sanremo Music Festival and won the competition with the song "Solo noi" ("Only us"). However, Cutugno's affiliation with the festival is mostly remembered for "L'Italiano" ("The Italian"), a song he presented in 1983. Originally intended for Adriano Celentano – who declined to sing it because, despite liking the song, he did not feel comfortable singing the refrain sono un italiano vero ("I am a true Italian") – "L'Italiano"'s recapitulation of some of Italy's most popular social traits made the song very popular with Italian expats. Although the song finished only fifth in Sanremo, it went on to become Cutugno's biggest international hit. Cutugno would finish second in six more editions of the Sanremo festival: in 1984 with the song "Serenata" ("Serenade"); in 1987 with "Figli" ("Children"); in 1988 with "Emozioni" ("Emotions"); in 1989 with the song "Le mamme" ("Mothers"); in 1990 with the song "Gli amori" ("Loves", but entitled "Good Love Gone Bad" in Ray Charles's version); and in 2005 with Annalisa Minetti with the song "Come noi nessuno al mondo" ("No one else in the world like us"); a record which would lead him to be nicknamed "the eternal second" (l'eterno secondo). Cutugno shares the record for the highest number of participations in the festival – 15, namely in 1976, 1977, 1980, 1983, 1984, 1986, 1987, 1988, 1989, 1990, 1995, 1997, 2005, 2008, and 2010; one of only five artists (as of 2023), the others being Al Bano, Anna Oxa, Milva and Peppino di Capri. In 2013, Cutugno was awarded a lifetime career award at the Sanremo Festival.

As a songwriter, during the 1980s Cutugno composed hit songs for numerous artists, notably Miguel Bosé (the Festivalbar winning song "Super Superman"), Adriano Celentano ("Il tempo se ne va"), Luis Miguel ("Noi, ragazzi di oggi"), Fausto Leali ("Io amo"), Peppino di Capri ("Il sognatore"), Ricchi e Poveri ("Canzone d'amore"), Fiordaliso ("Per noi" and "Se non avessi te"). Starting from 1987, when he co-hosted with Lino Banfi the Sunday television show Domenica in, Cutugno also had a successful career as a television presenter.

In 1990, at the refusal of Sanremo winners Pooh, Cutugno, who had placed second, was invited to represent Italy at the Eurovision Song Contest in Zagreb. He went on to win the contest with his own original composition "Insieme: 1992" ("Together: 1992"), a ballad which celebrated European political integration and the establishment of the European Union. Aged 46 years, 302 days, Cutugno became the oldest winner of the contest to that date, surpassing the record set by André Claveau in 1958. Cutugno's record stood until 2000, when the Olsen Brothers won the contest. Along with Gigliola Cinquetti, Italy's earlier Eurovision winner, he presented the 1991 contest, which was staged in Rome as a result of his victory. Italy would only win again with Måneskin in 2021.

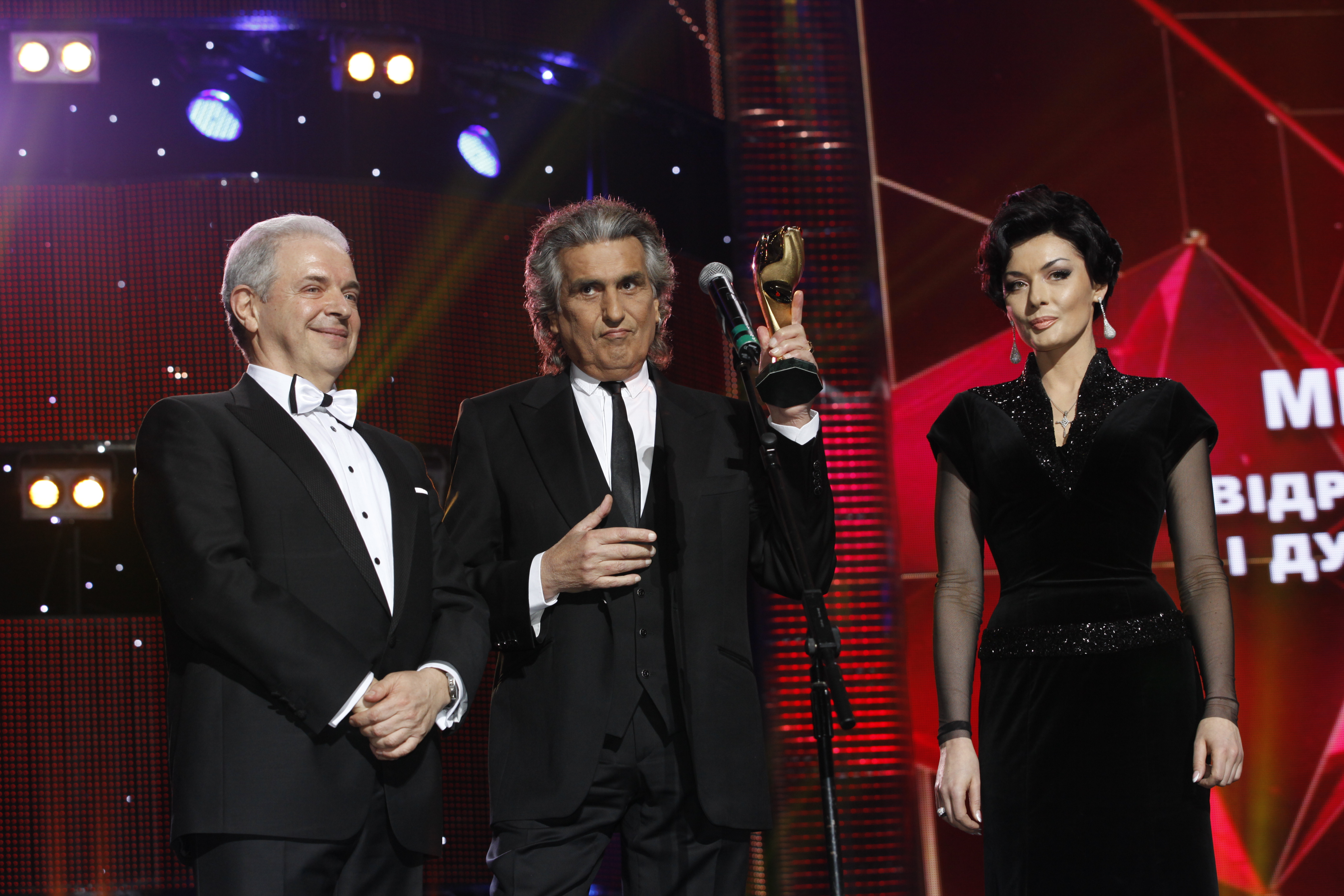
Cutugno receiving an award in Ukraine, 2012

In 2014, he was the main subject of a Facebook page, La stessa foto di Toto Cutugno ogni giorno (lit. 'The same photo of Toto Cutugno every day'), which in a short time became an internet phenomenon, attracting thousands of likes, sharings and comments; the case eventually became the subject of a study of the Institute for Advanced Study in Pavia. In 2016, he returned to collaborate with Adriano Celentano, co-writing the song "Ti lascio amore" for the Mina–Celentano album Le migliori.

Outside of Italy, Cutugno often toured in the United States, regularly performing in New York City and Atlantic City; he also toured Australia three times, represented by Italo-Australian impresario Duane Zigliotto. Countries where he was very popular include Germany, Spain, Romania, Turkey and Russia, where in 2013 he performed "L'Italiano" accompanied by the Red Army Choir. In March 2019, a group of politicians from the Ukrainian Parliament tried to stop Cutugno from performing in Kyiv, demanding through an open letter to the head of the country's security services, Vasyl Hrytsak, to ban the singer from entering Ukrainian territory, labelling him as "a Russian war supporter in Ukraine" – probably because of his success in Russia and his relationship with the Red Army Choir. Two days before, fellow Italian singer Al Bano had been blacklisted on the Ukrainian website Myrotvorets. Cutugno rejected the accusations, describing himself as apolitical and highlighting how he had refused to perform in Crimea following its 2014 Russian occupation. Despite the controversy, the concert was eventually held in Kyiv on 23 March. The same year, Cutugno had his last significant television role as one of the coaches in the musical show Ora o mai più. In August of that same year, he made one of his last live performances, as a guest in Jovanotti's Jova Beach Tour.

== Personal life and death ==
When he was five, Cutugno witnessed the death of his seven-year-old sister Anna, who choked on a gnocchi. His other siblings included Roberto and Rosanna (the first child to receive heart surgery in Italy, in Turin).

Cutugno was married to Carla from 1971 until his death. In 1990, he had a son from an extramarital relationship.

In 2007, Cutugno was diagnosed with prostate cancer with metastases reaching his kidneys, undergoing surgery and having his right kidney removed. He regarded his colleague Al Bano as the one who helped him to discover the cancer in time and who assisted him in the situation.

Cutugno died from prostate cancer at the San Raffaele Hospital in Milan, on 22 August 2023, aged 80.

== Discography ==
=== Studio albums ===
- Come ieri, come oggi, come sempre (1978)
- Voglio l'anima (1979)
- Innamorata, innamorato, innamorati (1980)
- La mia musica (1982)
- L'Italiano (1983)
- Per amore o per gioco (1985)
- Azzurra malinconia (1986)
- Mediterraneo (1987)
- Toto Cutugno (1990)
- Insieme: 1992 (1990)
- Non è facile essere uomini (1991)
- Voglio andare a vivere in campagna (1995)
- Canzoni nascoste (1997)
- Il treno va (2002)
- Cantando (2004)
- Come noi nessuno al mondo (2005)
- Un falco chiuso in gabbia (2008)

==== With Albatros ====
- Albatros (1976)

== See also ==
- List of Eurovision Song Contest presenters
- List of Eurovision Song Contest winners

Awards and achievements
Preceded by Mino Vergnaghi with "Amare"	Sanremo Music Festival; Winner; 1980	Succeeded by Alice with "Per Elisa"
Preceded by (Socialist Federal Republic of Yugoslavia) Riva with "Rock Me"	Winner of the Eurovision Song Contest; 1990	Succeeded by (Sweden) Carola with "Fångad av en stormvind"
Preceded by Anna Oxa and Fausto Leali with "Avrei voluto"	Italy in the Eurovision Song Contest; 1990	Succeeded by Peppino di Capri with "Comme è ddoce 'o mare"
Preceded by (Socialist Federal Republic of Yugoslavia) Helga Vlahović and Oliver Mlakar	Eurovision Song Contest presenter (with Gigliola Cinquetti); 1991	Succeeded by (Sweden) Lydia Capolicchio and Harald Treutiger
