= Vito Pallavicini =

Italian lyricist (1924–2007)

- Born: 22 April 1924; Vigevano, Kingdom of Italy
- Died: 16 August 2007 (aged 83); Vigevano, Italy
- Occupations: Journalist; songwriter

Vito Pallavicini (22 April 1924 – 16 August 2007) was an Italian lyricist.

== Biography ==
Born in Vigevano, Pallavicini started his career as a journalist, founding in 1950 the local weekly magazine L'informatore vigevanese. In 1959, he made his professional debut as a lyricist, co-writing with Pino Massara the song "Amorevole" for Nicola Arigliano; soon after he co-wrote "Ghiaccio bollente" for Tony Dallara. He got his first major hit in 1961, with "Le mille bolle blu," sung by Mina.

Pallavicini is best-known for his long professional association with composers Pino Donaggio, with whom he composed Donaggio's signature song "Io che non vivo (senza te)", and Paolo Conte, with whom he co-wrote among other songs the hits "Tripoli '66" for Patty Pravo, "Azzurro" for Adriano Celentano and "Insieme a te non ci sto più" for Caterina Caselli. Other hits he penned include Albano Carrisi's "Nel sole", Adriano Celentano's "Svalutation", Mina's "È l'uomo per me", John Foster's "Amore scusami", Petula Clark's "Ciao Ciao", Robertino's and Bobby Rydell's "Un bacio piccolissimo", Fausto Leali's and Wilson Pickett's "Deborah", Milva's "La filanda" and "Nessuno di voi", Enzo Jannacci's "Messico e nuvole", Tony Dallara's "Come potrei dimenticarti", Remo Germani's "Stasera no no no", Fred Bongusto's "Amore fermati", Toto Cutugno's "Serenata", Al Bano and Romina Power's "Nostalgia canaglia" and "Cara terra mia". He died on 16 August 2007 at the age of 83.

== See also ==
- "You Don't Have to Say You Love Me"
