= Robert Goulet discography =

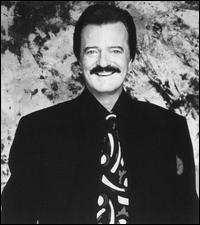
- Studio albums: 29
- Live albums: 2
- Compilation albums: 6
- Singles: 28

American and Canadian singer and actor of French-Canadian ancestry, Robert Gérard Goulet (1933 – 2007), known professionally as Robert Goulet, released 29 studio albums, two original live albums, various compilation and archival projects, and 28 singles. His most successful single was "My Love, Forgive Me" reached No. 16 on the Billboard Hot 100 and No. 22 in Canada.

== Albums ==
=== Studio albums ===
Year	Album	Peak positions		
Year	Album	US BB	US CB	CAN RPM
1961	Always You	43	—	—
1962	Two of Us	20	17	—
1962	Sincerely Yours...	9	6	—
1963	The Wonderful World of Love	11	8	—
1963	Annie Get Your Gun (with Doris Day)	—	—	—
1963	This Christmas I Spend With You	4	30	—
1964	Manhattan Tower / The Man Who Loves Manhattan	31	12	—
1964	Without You	72	29	—
1964	My Love Forgive Me	5	6	22
1965	Begin to Love	69	52	—
1965	Summer Sounds	31	26	—
1965	On Broadway	33	33	—
1966	I Remember You	73	73	—
1967	On Broadway, Vol. 2	145	—	—
1967	Hollywood Mon Amour – Great Love Songs from the Movies	—	96	—
1968	Woman, Woman	162	101	—
1968	Both Sides Now	135	—	—
1968	Robert Goulet's Wonderful World of Christmas	—	—	—
1969	Souvenir D'Italie	174	—	—
1969	Come Back to Sorrento	—	—	—
1970	Today's Greatest Hits	—	—	—
1970	I Wish You Love	198	—	—
1971	I Never Did as I Was Told,	—	—	—
1971	Bridge Over Troubled Water	—	—	—
1976	After All Is Said and Done	—	—	—
1978	You're Something Special...	—	—	—
1982	Close to You	—	—	—

=== Live albums ===
Year	Album	Peak positions		
Year	Album	US	US Cashbox	CAN
1963	Robert Goulet in Person: Recorded Live in Concert: Recorded in Chicago Opera House, Chicago, Illinois; Goulet's first live album	16	8	66
1966	Travelin' On Tour: Goulet's second live album	—	—	—

=== Compilation albums ===
Several Goulet compilations are noteworthy for either their chart success, as noted by 7 of them listed below, or the material included

Year	Title	Peak chart positions	
Year	Title	US	UK
1969	Robert Goulet's Greatest Hits: Label: Columbia	—	—
1986	As Time Goes By: Label: Memoir	—	—
1989	16 Most Requested Songs: Label: Columbia	—	—
1995	In Love: Label: Sony Music Distribution	—	—
2008	Music of Your Life: Best of Robert Goulet: Label: TGG Direct, LLC	—	—
2014	The Complete Columbia Christmas Recordings: Label: Real Gone Music	—	—

== Singles ==
Year	Single	Chart positions		Album
Year	Single	US	US AC	Album
1961	"I'm Just Taking My Time" b/w "One Life"	–	–	Non-album tracks
1962	"Too Soon" b/w "Two Different Worlds" (from My Love Forgive Me)	–	–	Non-album tracks
1962	"What Kind of Fool Am I?" b/w "Where Do I Go from Here" (from Two of Us)	89	–	My Love Forgive Me
1962	"Don't Be Afraid of Romance" b/w "Young at Love"	–	–	Non-album tracks
1963	"Two of Us" b/w "(These Are) The Closing Credits" (Non-album track)	132	–	Two Of Us
1963	"Believe in Me" b/w "How Very Special You Are"	–	–	Non-album tracks
1963	"Under the Yum Yum Tree" b/w "If You Go"	–	–	Non-album tracks
1964	"The Name of the Game" b/w "Choose"	–	–	Non-album tracks
1964	"Too Good" b/w "Seventh Dawn" (Non-album track)	–	–	My Love Forgive Me
1964	"My Love, Forgive Me (Amore, scusami)" /	16	2	My Love Forgive Me
1964	"I'd Rather Be Rich"	131	–	Non-album track
1965	"Begin to Love" b/w "I Never Got to Paris"	110	–	Begin to Love
1965	"Summer Sounds" b/w "The More I See of Mimi" (from Begin to Love)	58	14	Summer Sounds
1965	"Come Back to Me, My Love" /	118	5	On Broadway
1965	"On a Clear Day You Can See Forever"	119	13	On Broadway
1965	"Everlasting" b/w "Crazy Heart of Mine"	–	–	Non-album tracks
1966	"Why Be Ashamed" /	–	28	Non-album tracks
1966	"Young Only Yesterday"	–	37	I Remember You
1966	"Daydreamer" (from The Daydreamer (soundtrack)) b/w "My Best Girl"	–	22	Non-album tracks
1966	"Once I Had a Heart" b/w "I Hear a Different Drummer"	–	15	Non-album tracks
1966	"There But for You Go I" b/w "Fortissimo" (from Robert Goulet's Greatest Hits)	–	–	On Broadway, Volume 2
1967	"World of Clowns" b/w "Ciao Compare" (from On Broadway, Volume 2)	–	20	Non-album tracks
1967	"One Life, One Dream" b/w "There's a Way"	–	33	Non-album tracks
1967	"The Sinner" b/w "How Can I Leave You"	–	29	Non-album tracks
1967	"Mon Amour, Mon Amour" b/w "This Year"	–	–	Hollywood Mon Amour – Great Love Songs from the Movies
1967	"If Ever I Would Leave You" b/w "Follow Me"	–	–	Non-album tracks
1968	"The Happy Time" b/w "I Don't Remember You"	–	33	The Happy Time (Soundtrack)
1968	"What a Wonderful World" b/w "I Don't Want to Hurt You Anymore" (Non-album track)	–	26	Woman, Woman
1968	"Thirty Days Hath September" b/w "A Chance to Live in Camelot" (Non-album track)	–	17	Both Sides Now
1968	"Hurry Home for Christmas" b/w "A Wonderful World of Christmas"	–	–	Robert Goulet's Wonderful World of Christmas
1969	"Wait for Me" b/w "I'll Catch the Sun"	–	–	Non-album tracks
1969	"Didn't We" b/w "Bon Soir Dame" (from Both Sides Now)	–	33	I Wish You Love
1969	"Only Yesterday" b/w "One Life to Live"	–	–	Non-album tracks
1969	"One Night" b/w "I Can't Live Without You"	–	–	Non-album tracks
1970	"My Woman, My Woman, My Wife" b/w "Come Saturday"	–	–	Robert Goulet Sings Today's Greatest Hits
1970	"Healing River" b/w "One at a Time"	–	–	Non-album tracks
1973	"God Is at Work Within You" b/w "One Solitary Life"	–	–	Non-album tracks
1974	"Pages of Life" b/w "Summer Green, Autumn Gold"	–	–	Non-album tracks
1974	"The Little Prince" b/w "I Won't Send Roses"	–	–	After All Is Said and Done
1975	"Someone to Give My Love To" b/w "Something to Believe In"	–	–	After All Is Said and Done
1976	"After All Is Said and Done" b/w "The Little Prince"	–	–	After All Is Said and Done
1999	"You've Got a Friend in Me"	-	-	Toy Story 2: An Original Walt Disney Records Soundtrack
2001	"Green Tambourine"	-	-	Recess: School's Out (Original Movie Soundtrack)
