= List of number-one hits of 1963 (Brazil) =

This is a list of the songs that reached number one in Brazil in 1963, according to Cashbox magazine with data provided by the Brazilian Institute of Public Opinion and Statistics.

Issue date	Song	Artist(s)
February 9	"I Can't Stop Loving You"	Ray Charles
February 16	"I Can't Stop Loving You"	Ray Charles
February 23	"I Can't Stop Loving You"	Ray Charles
March 2	"I Can't Stop Loving You"	Ray Charles
March 9	"Filme triste"	Trio Esperança
March 16	"Filme triste"	Trio Esperança
March 23	"Filme triste"	Trio Esperança
March 30	"Filme triste"	Trio Esperança
April 6	"Filme triste"	Trio Esperança
April 13	"Filme triste"	Trio Esperança
April 20	"Filme triste"	Trio Esperança
May 4	"Filme triste"	Trio Esperança
May 11	"Filme triste"	Trio Esperança
May 18	"O Amor Mais Puro"	Francisco Petronio
May 25	"O Amor Mais Puro"	Francisco Petronio
June 1	"O Amor Mais Puro"	Francisco Petronio
June 8	"Que Será De Ti"	Moacyr Franco
June 22	"Que Será De Ti"	Moacyr Franco
June 29	"Tudo De Mim"	Altemar Dutra
July 6	"Tudo De Mim"	Altemar Dutra
July 13	"Tudo De Mim"	Altemar Dutra
July 20	"Tudo De Mim"	Altemar Dutra
July 27	"Tudo De Mim"	Altemar Dutra
August 3	"Tudo De Mim"	Altemar Dutra
August 17	"Sonhar Contigo"	Adilson Ramos
August 24	"Sonhar Contigo"	Adilson Ramos
September 7	"Sonhar Contigo"	Adilson Ramos
September 14	"Sonhar Contigo"	Adilson Ramos
September 21	"El Relicario"	The Clevers
September 28	"El Relicario"	The Clevers
October 5	"El Relicario"	The Clevers
October 12	"El Relicario"	The Clevers
October 26	"Doce Amargura"	Moacyr Franco
November 9	"Doce Amargura"	Moacyr Franco
November 16	"Doce Amargura"	Moacyr Franco
December 7	"Doce Amargura"	Moacyr Franco
December 14	"Doce Amargura"	Moacyr Franco
December 21	"Acorrentados"	Agnaldo Rayol

== See also ==
- 1963 in music
- List of number-one hits of 1964 (Brazil)
- List of number-one hits of 1965 (Brazil)
- List of number-one hits of 1966 (Brazil)
- List of number-one hits of 1967 (Brazil)
