= List of number-one hits of 1967 (Brazil) =

This is a list of the songs that reached number one in Brazil in 1967, according to Cashbox magazine with data provided by the Brazilian Institute of Public Opinion and Statistics.

Issue date	Song	Artist(s)
January 14	"Lara's Theme"	Al Korvin/The Jordans
January 21	"A Carta/Gatinho Manhosa"	Erasmo Carlos
January 28	"Lara's Theme"	Al Korvin/The Jordans
February 4	"Lara's Theme"	Al Korvin/The Jordans
February 11	"A Carta/Gatinho Manhosa"	Erasmo Carlos
February 18	"A Carta/Gatinho Manhosa"	Erasmo Carlos
February 25	"A Carta/Gatinho Manhosa"	Erasmo Carlos
March 11	"Namoradinho De Um Amigo Meu"	Roberto Carlos
March 18	"Namoradinho De Um Amigo Meu"	Roberto Carlos
March 25	"Namoradinho De Um Amigo Meu"	Roberto Carlos
April 1	"Bus Stop (Pensando Nela)"	The Hollies/Golden Boys
April 8	"Bus Stop (Pensando Nela)"	The Hollies/Golden Boys
April 15	"Bus Stop (Pensando Nela)"	The Hollies/Golden Boys
April 22	"Bus Stop (Pensando Nela)"	The Hollies/Golden Boys
April 29	"Bus Stop (Pensando Nela)"	The Hollies/Golden Boys
May 27	"A Praça"	Ronnie Von/Francisco Petrônio/Wilson Simonal
June 3	"A Praça"	Ronnie Von/Francisco Petrônio/Wilson Simonal
June 10	"A Praça"	Ronnie Von/Francisco Petrônio/Wilson Simonal
June 17	"A Praça"	Ronnie Von/Francisco Petrônio/Wilson Simonal
June 24	"A Praça"	Ronnie Von/Francisco Petrônio/Wilson Simonal
July 1	"O Bom Rapaz"	Wanderléa
July 8	"O Bom Rapaz"	Wanderléa
July 15	"O Bom Rapaz"	Wanderléa
July 22	"O Bom Rapaz"	Wanderléa
July 29	"O Bom Rapaz"	Wanderléa
August 12	"Meu Grito"	Agnaldo Timóteo
August 19	"Meu Grito"	Agnaldo Timóteo
August 26	"Meu Grito"	Agnaldo Timóteo
September 16	"Meu Grito"	Agnaldo Timóteo
September 23	"Eu Te Amo Mesmo Assim"	Martinha
September 30	"Eu Te Amo Mesmo Assim"	Martinha
October 7	"Eu Te Amo Mesmo Assim"	Martinha
October 14	"Eu Te Amo Mesmo Assim"	Martinha
October 21	"Eu Te Amo Mesmo Assim"	Martinha
October 28	"Eu Te Amo Mesmo Assim"	Martinha
November 4	"A Whiter Shade of Pale"	Procol Harum
November 11	"A Whiter Shade of Pale"	Procol Harum
November 18	"A Whiter Shade of Pale"	Procol Harum
November 25	"A Whiter Shade of Pale"	Procol Harum
December 2	"A Whiter Shade of Pale"	Procol Harum
December 9	"Maria, Carnival e Cinzas"	Roberto Carlos

== See also ==
- 1967 in music
- List of number-one hits of 1964 (Brazil)
- List of number-one hits of 1965 (Brazil)
- List of number-one hits of 1966 (Brazil)
