= Always You =

Always You may refer to:

- Always You (James Ingram album), 1993
- Always You (Robert Goulet album), 1961
- "Always You" (Charice Pempengco song)
- "Always You" (Jennifer Paige song), 1999
- "Always You", a song by Nat King Cole and later covered by Robert Goulet
- "Always You", a song by Louis Tomlinson from his 2020 album Walls
