= Francesco Romano =

Francesco Romano may refer to:

- Francesco Romano (footballer) (born 1960), Italian footballer
- Francesco Romano (cyclist) (born 1997), Italian racing cyclist
- Francesco Saverio Romano (born 1964), Italian politician
- Francesco Romano (born 1946), musician with Franco IV e Franco I
