= List of number-one hits of 1965 (Argentina) =

Billboard top one songs in Argentina

This is a list of the songs that reached number one in Argentina in 1965, according to Billboard magazine with data provided by Rubén Machado's "Escalera a la fama".

Issue date	Song	Artist(s)
January 2	"Flauta e' caña"	La Charanga del Caribe
January 16	"Flauta e' caña"	La Charanga del Caribe
January 23	"Amor"	Nat King Cole
January 30	"Amor"	Nat King Cole
March 6	"Amor"	Nat King Cole
March 13	"Trinidad"	Cuarteto imperial
March 20	"Trinidad"	Cuarteto imperial
March 27	"Nosotros"/"Piel Canela"	Eydie Gormé & Los Panchos/Chico Miranda
April 3	"Do Re Mi"	The Cousins/Millie Small/Simonette
April 10	"Do Re Mi"	The Cousins/Millie Small/Simonette
April 17	"Trinidad"	Cuarteto imperial
May 1	"Es una mujer (She's a Woman)"/"Me siento bien (I Feel Fine)"	The Beatles/Juan Ramón
May 8	"Es una mujer (She's a Woman)"/"Me siento bien (I Feel Fine)"	The Beatles/Juan Ramón
May 22	"Ma vie"	Alain Barriere
May 29	"A mover el esqueleto"	La Charanga del Caribe
June 5	"A mover el esqueleto"	La Charanga del Caribe
June 12	"Lección de besos (Letkis)"	Piero Sancho/Míster Trombón/ Ronnie Kranckin/S.O. Waldoff
June 19	"Lección de besos (Letkis)"	Piero Sancho/Míster Trombón/ Ronnie Kranckin/S.O. Waldoff
June 26	"Lección de besos (Letkis)"	Piero Sancho/Míster Trombón/ Ronnie Kranckin/S.O. Waldoff
July 3	"Lección de besos (Letkis)"	Piero Sancho/Míster Trombón/ Ronnie Kranckin/S.O. Waldoff
July 10	"Amor, perdóname (Amore scusami)"	John Foster/Juan Ramón/ Tito Rodríguez/Dalida/Claudia
July 17	"Amor, perdóname (Amore scusami)"	John Foster/Juan Ramón/ Tito Rodríguez/Dalida/Claudia
July 24	"He comprendido que te amo (Ho capito che ti amo)"	Luigi Tenco/Wilma Goich/José Antonio
July 31	"He comprendido que te amo (Ho capito che ti amo)"	Luigi Tenco/Wilma Goich/José Antonio
August 7	"Venecia sin ti"	Charles Aznavour/Juan Ramón
August 14	"Venecia sin ti"	Charles Aznavour/Juan Ramón
August 21	"Venecia sin ti"	Charles Aznavour/Juan Ramón/Ely Neri
August 28	"Venecia sin ti"	Charles Aznavour/Juan Ramón/Ely Neri
September 4	"Venecia sin ti"	Charles Aznavour/Juan Ramón/Ely Neri
September 11	"Venecia sin ti"	Charles Aznavour/Juan Ramón/Ely Neri
September 18	"Venecia sin ti"	Charles Aznavour/Juan Ramón/Ely Neri
September 25	"Venecia sin ti"	Charles Aznavour/Juan Ramón/Ely Neri
October 2	"Venecia sin ti"	Charles Aznavour/Juan Ramón/Ely Neri
October 9	"Venecia sin ti"	Charles Aznavour/Juan Ramón/Ely Neri
October 16	"Venecia sin ti"	Charles Aznavour/Juan Ramón/Ely Neri
October 23	"Venecia sin ti"	Charles Aznavour/Juan Ramón/Ely Neri
October 30	"Venecia sin ti"	Charles Aznavour/Juan Ramón/Ely Neri
November 6	"Venecia sin ti"	Charles Aznavour/Juan Ramón/Ely Neri
November 20	"¡Socorro! (Help!)"	The Beatles/Los Búhos
November 27	"¡Socorro! (Help!)"	The Beatles/Los Búhos
December 4	"Shame and Scandal in the Family"	Shawn Elliot/Sacha Distel/Lance Percival/ Juan Montego & The Kingston Orchestra
December 11	"Shame and Scandal in the Family"	Shawn Elliot/Sacha Distel/Lance Percival/ Juan Montego & The Kingston Orchestra
December 18	"A veces me pregunto yo"	Richard Anthony
December 25	"Changuito Dios"	Palito Ortega

== See also ==
- 1965 in music
