= List of number-one hits of 1965 (Brazil) =

This is a list of the songs that reached number one in Brazil in 1965, according to Cashbox magazine with data provided by the Brazilian Institute of Public Opinion and Statistics.

Issue date	Song	Artist(s)
January 30	"Michael"	Trini Lopez
February 6	"Michael"	Trini Lopez
February 13	"Michael"	Trini Lopez
February 20	"Michael"	Trini Lopez
February 27	"Amore scusami"	John Foster
March 6	"Amore scusami"	John Foster
March 13	"Amore scusami"	John Foster
March 20	"Amore scusami"	John Foster
March 27	"Perfidia"	Trini Lopez
April 3	"Perfidia"	Trini Lopez
April 10	"Perfidia"	Trini Lopez
April 17	"Amore scusami"	John Foster
April 24	"Amore scusami"	John Foster
May 1	"Oferenda"	Altemar Dutra
May 8	"Oferenda"	Altemar Dutra
July 17	"Se piangi, se ridi"	Bobby Solo
July 24	"Se piangi, se ridi"	Bobby Solo
July 31	"Se piangi, se ridi"	Bobby Solo
August 7	"Se piangi, se ridi"	Bobby Solo
August 14	"Se piangi, se ridi"	Bobby Solo
August 21	"Não quero ver você triste"	Roberto Carlos
September 11	"Não quero ver você triste"	Roberto Carlos
September 25	"Io che non vivo (senza te)"	Pino Donaggio
October 2	"Pau de Arara"	Ary Toledo
October 9	"Pau de Arara"	Ary Toledo
October 16	"Ma vie"	Alain Barrière
October 23	"Ma vie"	Alain Barrière
November 27	"Shame and Scandal in the Family"	Shawn Elliott/Chantecler
December 4	"Shame and Scandal in the Family"	Shawn Elliott/Chantecler
December 11	"Shame and Scandal in the Family"	Shawn Elliott/Chantecler
December 18	"Shame and Scandal in the Family"	Shawn Elliott/Chantecler

== See also ==
- List of number-one hits of 1964 (Brazil)
- 1965 in music
- List of number-one hits of 1966 (Brazil)
