= Acting Sheriff =

Unsold 1991 American television pilot

- Genre: Comedy; Drama
- Written by: Larry Strawther; Gary Murphy
- Directed by: Michael Lembeck
- Starring: Robert Goulet; John Putch; Hillary Bailey Smith; Ruth Kobart; Diane Delano; Lee Tergesen
- Country of origin: United States
- Original language: English
- No. of seasons: 1
- No. of episodes: 1

Production
- Executive producer: Gary Murphy
- Producer: Tim Steele
- Running time: 30 minutes (including commercials)
- Production company: Walt Disney Television

Original release
- Release: August 17 – August 17, 1991

Acting Sheriff is an unsold, half-hour television pilot sitcom created by Walt Disney Television for television network CBS that aired across the United States on Saturday, August 17, 1991. Identified as episode number 895 in Walt Disney Television season number 35, the 30-minute comedy drama featured Robert Goulet as B movie actor Brent McCord who is elected to the unlikely job of sheriff in a small Northern California town. With only an actor's knowledge and experience of what a sheriff does, the McCord character clashes with the local district attorney, character Donna Singer, and eventually lets a bank robber–prisoner escape. Character Mike Swanson, a deputy who is loyal to McCord, captures the escaped prisoner and helps cover for McCord's mistake by informing news reporters that McCord made the capture.

== Response ==
Initially, Acting Sheriff was thought to have a good chance of filling the Saturday 10:30 PM slot in the CBS 1991 fall television schedule. In addition to the draw of noted actor Robert Goulet, the show was developed by the writing team of Larry Strawther and Gary Murphy, who were the writers of Night Court, a then-widely popular American television situation comedy, and the writers of Without a Clue, a 1988 comedy film starring Michael Caine and Ben Kingsley. However, the one-time-only, August 17, 1991, presentation of Acting Sheriff received poor ratings.

In the August 21, 1991 primetime ratings for the week of August 12 to August 18, Acting Sheriff received a 4.6 share and was ranked as number 83 out of a total of 90 primetime television shows. The 4.6 share represented 4.3 million TV homes out of a possible 93.1 million TV homes. Despite the poor showing by Acting Sheriff, CBS tied television network ABC for first place in the August 12 to August 18 network ratings battle. CBS eventually filled the Saturday 10:30 PM to 11:00 PM primetime slot with 48 Hours, a documentary and news program broadcast on the CBS television network since January 19, 1988.

Critics' reactions were mixed. The Florida daily newspaper St. Petersburg Times rated Acting Sheriff a "best bet." However, the weekly entertainment trade newspaper Variety found the Brent McCord character too cartoonish to support the show as a series. In describing Goulet's performance as Brent McCord, Variety stated that it was "a goof on Ronald Reagan by way of Ted Baxter" and came across as a "trigger-happy, ACLU-bashing boob whose disregard for the law is equaled only by his vanity." Variety also faulted the show's appearance and other characters as too closely resembling the look, feel, and characters of Night Court. Fourteen years later, American actor Lee Tergesen, who was on Acting Sheriff with Robert Goulet, characterized Goulet's performance as "quite good."

== Reaction to response ==
The August 17, 1991, airing of the show was its only broadcast. In a December 1991 effort to raise more than $200 million to finance Disney's network television business, Disney created Zero Coupon Based Rate Adjustment Securities ("ZEBRAS") as promissory notes to be used to obtain money from the investing public. Disney added Acting Sheriff and other television projects such as Lenny, The Fanelli Boys, Singer & Sons, and Stat to the ZEBRAS. Even though Acting Sheriff and the other projects were considered "dead dogs" by some, Disney presented ZEBRAS as a way for the public to buy into programming Walt Disney Television that was started in October 1988 and profiting from possible hits similar to Blossom, Golden Girls, and Empty Nest.

The 15-year ZEBRA zero-coupon bonds carried a guaranteed yield of 4% with a promise of up to a 20% return if Acting Sheriff or any of the other included shows were sold into syndication. The bonds were seen both as innovative and controversial by tying their investment return to the performance of Disney's television shows. With analysts saying the deal was not a good one for investors, the ZEBRAS were not successful. Disney ended their offerings 23 days after the program started, citing falling interest rates as a reason for terminating the ZEBRA program.

Interest in Acting Sheriff largely remained dormant for the next thirteen years. However, in 2004, Acting Sheriff made its way onto the August 16, 2004, television show, The Best TV Shows That Never Were. As one of 40+ reviewed television pilots from a pool of thousands available pilots, clips of Acting Sheriff were used by The Best TV Shows That Never Were show to insinuate that it was one of the worst aired pilots. In reviewing The Best TV Shows That Never Were, the New York Post ranked Acting Sheriff along the lines of the pilot for a "mellow John Denver cast against type as a two-fisted FBI agent in the mountain adventure Higher Ground" and the pilot where Tom Selleck and Robert Urich co-starred in the cop drama Bunco.
