= This Christmas I Spend With You =

Studio album by Robert Goulet
- Released: November 1963
- Genre: Christmas, traditional pop
- Length: 33:51
- Label: Columbia Records
- Producer: Jim Foglesong

Robert Goulet chronology
Robert Goulet in Person: Recorded Live in Concert (1963)	This Christmas I Spend With You (1963)	Manhattan Tower / The Man Who Loves Manhattan (1964)

This Christmas I Spend With You is the fifth studio album by American singer Robert Goulet, released in November 1963, by Columbia Records, and was available both in stereo and mono. It was produced by Jim Foglesong,

== Background ==
The selections are a mix of traditional Christmas carols (such as "O Holy Night", and "O Come, All Ye Faithful", and "Silent Night",) and 20th-century tunes of the season (including "Winter Wonderland", "Let It Snow! Let It Snow! Let It Snow!", and "The Christmas Song"), including two original tunes.

== Chart performance ==
The album debuted on Billboard magazine's Christmas Albums sales chart in the issue dated November 30, 1963, and spent two of its 16 weeks-stay at number four, his highest position had achieved on that chart. It also appeared on the magazine's seasonal LP chart each year from 1964 to 1965 as well as in 1967 and 1968. the album debuted on the Cashbox albums chart in the issue dated November 30, 1963 and remained on the chart for a total of eight weeks, peaking at number 30.

== Other releases ==
Real Gone Music labels included this CD in the 2014 The Complete Columbia Christmas Recordings box set.

== Reception ==
Professional ratings
Review scores
Source	Rating
Allmusic	3/5 stars

Marvin Jolly of AllMusic believed "This Christmas I Spend with You is no less delightful, with renditions of seasonal favorites including "Have Yourself a Merry Little Christmas," "Let It Snow! Let It Snow! Let It Snow!" and "Silver Bells."

Billboard wrote in their review stated "Goulet sings with warmth and real meaning a well-selected mixture of the secular and the sacred things from raning from 'Panis Angelicus' and 'Ave Maria' to 'Let it Snow', and 'This Christmas I Spend With You'

Cashbox praised Goulet for "his rich, warm treatments of “The Christmas Song,” “Silver Bells” and “O Come All Ye Faithful."

== Track listing ==
=== Side one ===
No.	Title	Writer(s)	Length
1.	"This Christmas I Spend With You"	Tony Velona	2:30
2.	"Have Yourself a Merry Little Christmas" (from the Metro-Goldwyn-Mayer Pictures: Meet Me in St. Louis)	Ralph Blane, Hugh Martin	2:54
3.	"December Time"	Walter Grieve	2:41
4.	"Let It Snow! Let It Snow! Let It Snow!"	Sammy Cahn, Jule Styne	2:42
5.	"The Christmas Song (Chestnuts Roasting on an Open Fire)"	Mel Tormé, Robert Wells	3:30
6.	"Silver Bells" (from the Paramount Pictures: The Lemon Drop Kid)	Jay Livingston, Ray Evans	2:39

=== Side two ===
No.	Title	Writer(s)	Length
1.	"Winter Wonderland"	Felix Bernard, Richard Bernhard Smith	2:39
2.	"White Christmas" (from the Paramount Pictures: Holiday Inn)	Irving Berlin	3:19
3.	"O Holy Night"	Adolphe Adam, John Sullivan Dwight	2:10
4.	"Panis Angelicus"	César Franck	3:15
5.	"Ave Maria"	Johann Sebastian Bach, Charles Gounod	2:17
6.	"O Come, All Ye Faithful"	Frederick Oakeley, John Francis Wade	2:21

== Billboard and Cashbox Christmas Albums charts ==
Billboard debut date	Peak position
11/30/63	4
12/12/64	5
12/18/65	17
12/23/67	90
12/21/68	30

Cashbox debut date	Peak position
11/30/63	30
12/26/64	88
