= Gino Mescoli =

Italian composer and conductor (born 1930)

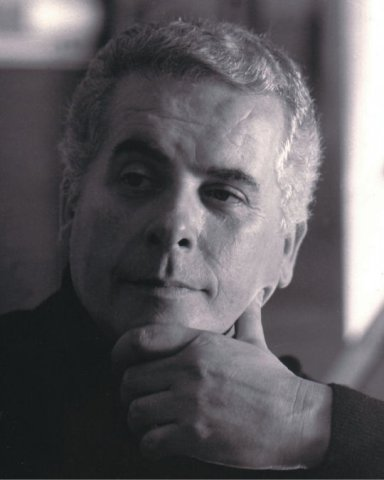
- Mescoli in 1986
- Born: Gianni Mescoli; 11 July 1930 (age 94); San Benedetto Po, Italy
- Other names: Musikus
- Occupation: Composer

Gianni "Gino" Mescoli (born 11 July 1930) is an Italian composer, arranger, conductor, pianist and record producer.

== Life and career ==
Born in San Benedetto Po, Mescoli started studying music with composers Giacomo Savini and Ettore Campogalliani, and graduated in piano from the Parma Conservatory.

Mescoli entered the music industry as a pianist, and got his first contract as a composer thanks to Carlo Alberto Rossi. As a composer, he became a close collaborator of Vito Pallavicini, and got his early hits for John Foster. His best known compositions include Foster's "Amore scusami", "Eri un'abitudine" and "Cominciamo ad amarci", Franco IV e Franco I's "Ho scritto t'amo sulla sabbia", Robertino's "Un bacio piccolissimo", Claudio Villa's 1967 Eurovision entry "Non andare più lontano" and Gilda Giuliani's "Serena".

In the 1970s, Mescoli served as main conductor in several editions of the Castrocaro Music Festival. He took part in four editions of the World Popular Song Festival, winning the competition twice, in 1973 with Gilda Giuliani's "Parigi a volte cosa fa" and in 1976 with Franco & Regina's "Amore Mio". He also served as artistic director for the record company Style.
