= My Love Forgive Me (album) =

Studio album by Robert Goulet
- Released: December 1964
- Genre: Traditional pop
- Length: 31:12
- Label: Columbia
- Producer: Ralph Burns

Robert Goulet chronology
Without You (1964)	My Love Forgive Me (1964)	Begin to Love (1965)

Singles from My Love Forgive Me
- 1. "What Kind of Fool Am I?" Released: August 10, 1962; 2. "Too Good" Released: June 8, 1964; 3. "My Love Forgive Me" Released: September 4, 1964

My Love Forgive Me is the eighth studio album by American singer Robert Goulet, released in December 1964, by Columbia Records, and was available both in stereo and mono. It was produced by Ralph Burns, and features the singles, "What Kind of Fool Am I?", "Too Good" and his most successful "My Love, Forgive Me". The album included mix of originals and covers of old standards and like "This Is All I Ask", "Softly, as I Leave You", and "Quiet Nights of Quiet Stars"

The album was released on compact disc as one of two albums on one CD by Collectables Records on July 1, 1997, as tracks 1 through 12 on a pairing of two albums on one CD with tracks 13 through 24 consisting of Goulet's 1962 Columbia album, Sincerely Yours...

== Chart performance ==
The album debuted on the Billboard Top LPs chart in the issue dated December 26, 1964, and remained on the chart for 29 weeks, peaking at number five, his highest position for a non-holiday album on that chart. It debuted on the Cash Box albums chart in the issue dated December 19, 1964, and remained on the chart for a total of 26 weeks, peaking at number six. The album was certified Gold by the Recording Industry Association of America on October 30, 1968, for sales over 500,000 copies.

The single, "What Kind of Fool Am I?", debuted on the Billboard Hot 100 in the chart dated October 6, 1962, reaching number 89 in a two-week stay on the chart. "My Love Forgive Me", debuted on the Hot 100 on October 24, 1964, spending three weeks at number 16 during a 15-week run, his highest single chart. number 15 on the Cash Box singles chart, in a 16-week run on the chart, and number two on the Billboard Easy Listening chart during its 15-week run.

== Reception ==
Professional ratings
Review scores
Source	Rating
AllMusic	3/5 stars
The Encyclopedia of Popular Music	4/5 stars

William Ruhlmann of AllMusic called it "one of Goulet's better collections and stated that "Anglicized foreign songs, such as "Just Say I Love Her (Dicitencello Vuie)" and Antonio Carlos Jobim's "Quiet Nights of Quiet Stars (Corcovado)." Suddenly with this material, Goulet seemed less like a fading middle-of-the-road pop singer and more like a potential competitor to the mop-topped hordes".

Billboard praised Goulet for working "his distinctive, powerful voice softly over a dozen pop ballads such as 'Corcovado', 'Just Say I Love Her', 'This Is All I Ask' and a fine legit redition of 'What Kind of Fool Am I'."

Variety praised Goulet for "Giving out with large and lush vocal treatment of such songs as 'Now That It's Ended' ... and others".

Record World notes: "Goulet gives a more off-handed delivery than usual on this disk."

The Encyclopedia of Popular Music referred to the album as one of "Goulet's Top Performing Albums", giving it a four-star rating, meaning that they believed that album was "A high standard album from Goulet, and therefore highly recommended. while getting a three-star rating from AllMusic.

== Track listing ==
=== Side one ===
No.	Title	Writer(s)	Length
1.	"My Love, Forgive Me (Amore scusami)"	Gino Mescoli, Vito Pallavicini, Sydney Lee	2:48
2.	"Now That It's Ended"	Charlie Chaplin	2:12
3.	"Quiet Nights of Quiet Stars (Corcovado)"	Antônio Carlos Jobim, Buddy Kaye	2:08
4.	"Softly, as I Leave You"	Giorgio Calabrese, Tony De Vita, Hal Shaper	2:28
5.	"What Kind of Fool Am I?" (from the Broadway Musical: Stop the World – I Want to Get Off)	Leslie Bricusse, Anthony Newley	2:34
6.	"What Can I Do?"	Jack Segal, Paul Vance	2:21

=== Side two ===
No.	Title	Writer(s)	Length
1.	"Just Say I Love Her"	Rodolfo Falvo, Jack Val, Jimmy Dale, Enzo Fusco, Martin Kalmanoff, Sam Ward	3:07
2.	"Two Different Worlds"	Al Frisch, Sid Wayne	2:45
3.	"Welcome Home Angelina"	Bart Howard	2:23
4.	"Choose"	Lionel Bart	2:38
5.	"Too Good"	Louis Amade, Gilbert Bécaud, Norman Gimbel	2:29
6.	"This Is All I Ask"	Gordon Jenkins	3:19

== Charts ==
Chart peaks for My Love Forgive Me
Chart (1964–1965)	Peak position
US Billboard Top LPs	5
US Cashbox Top 100 Albums	6

=== Singles ===
Year	Single	Chart	Peak position
1962	"What Kind of Fool Am I?"	US Billboard Hot 100	89
1964	"My Love Forgive Me"	US Billboard Hot 100	16
1964	"My Love Forgive Me"	US Cashbox Top 100	15
1964	"My Love Forgive Me"	US Easy Listening	2

== Certifications ==
Certifications for My Love Forgive Me
Region	Certification	Certified units/sales
United States (RIAA)	Gold	500,000^{‡}
^{‡} Sales+streaming figures based on certification alone.
