= Begin to Love =

Studio album by Robert Goulet
- Released: May 1965
- Genre: Traditional pop
- Length: 32:39
- Label: Columbia
- Producer: Ernie Altschuler

Robert Goulet chronology
My Love Forgive Me (1964)	Begin to Love (1965)	Summer Sounds (1965)

Singles from Begin To Love
- 1. "Begin To Love (Cominciamo Ad Amarci)" Released: February 8, 1965

Begin to Love is the ninth studio album by American singer Robert Goulet, released in May 1965, by Columbia Records. and was available both in stereo and mono. It was produced by Ernie Altschuler, it was arranged and conducted by Artie Schroeck. and features the singles, "Begin to Love". It also contains a mix of originals and covers of old and recent hits that included one song that also had chart success in 1964 via The New Christy Minstrels: "Today".

The album debuted on the Billboard Top LPs chart in the issue dated June 5, 1965, and remained on the chart for 16 weeks, peaking at number 69. It debuted on the Cash Box albums chart in the issue dated June 5, 1965, and remained on the chart for 10 weeks, peaking at number 52.

The single, "Begin To Love", bubbled under" Billboard's Hot 100, for seven weeks in the issue dated February 27, 1965, reaching number 110. It peaked at number 79 on the Cash Box Top 100 Singles chart, in a two-week run on the chart.

The album was released on compact disc as one of two albums on one CD by Collectables Records on July 1, 1997, as tracks 13 through 24 on a pairing of two albums on one CD with tracks 1 through 12 consisting of Goulet's 1962 Columbia album, Two of Us.

== Reception ==
Professional ratings
Review scores
Source	Rating
AllMusic	4/5 stars
The Encyclopedia of Popular Music	3/5 stars

William Ruhlmann of AllMusic notes "the selections and the musical approaches taken with them are quite varied. A playful style is given to Cy Coleman and Carolyn Leigh's "Real Live Girl" (from the 1962 musical Little Me), then there are more traditional piano-and-string arrangements for "In the Still of the Night" and "Smile." "The More I See of Mimi," one of a few mediocre contemporary songs, has a barbershop quartet quality."

Billboard believed that the album "follows the pattern and it is a continual job" and praised Sid Ramin for his additional credit of "much of the arranging-conducting."

Cashbox notes that Goulet "spins a web of romantic mood music, with strong emphasis on melodies from past decades."

Variety said the album" is a solid collection of oldies and a few recents ballads, including his hit title song, plus 'Real Live Girl', and the pretty ballad 'Today'."

it was given a three-star rating by The Encyclopedia of Popular Music as well, meaning that they believed that album was "Good by the Goulet's usual standrands, and therefore recommended while AllMusic gave the album a four-star rating

== Track listing ==
=== Side one ===
No.	Title	Writer(s)	Length
1.	"Begin To Love (Cominciamo Ad Amarci)"	Gino Mescoli, Vito Pallavicini, Sydney Lee	2:09
2.	"As Time Goes By" (from the Warner Bros. Pictures film: Casablanca)	Herman Hupfeld,	2:40
3.	"Real Life Girl" (from the Broadway Musical: Little Me)	Carolyn Leigh, Cy Coleman	2:49
4.	"In the Still of the Night" (from the Metro-Goldwyn-Mayer Pictures film: Rosalie)	Cole Porter	3:14
5.	"Smile"	Charlie Chaplin, Geoffrey Parsons, John Turner	2:32
6.	"With These Hands"	Benny Davis, Abner Silver	2:25

=== Side two ===
No.	Title	Writer(s)	Length
1.	"The More I See of Mimi"	Jack Segal	2;22
2.	"Today"	Randy Sparks	3:58
3.	"Long Ago (and Far Away)" (from the Columbia Pictures film: Cover Girl)	Ira Gershwin, Jerome Kern	2:23
4.	"Time After Time" (from the Metro-Goldwyn-Mayer Pictures film: It Happened in Brooklyn)	Sammy Cahn, Jule Styne	2:47
5.	"I Never Got to Paris"	Jack Segal, Fred E. Ahlert	2:20
6.	"The Fall Of Love"	Dimitri Tiomkin, Ned Washington	2:33

== Charts ==
Chart (1965)	Peak position
US Billboard Top LPs	69
US Cash Box	52

Singles

Year	Single	Chart	Peak
1965	"Begin to Love"	US Billboard Hot 100	110
1965	"Begin to Love"	US Cash Box	79
