= Manhattan Tower (Robert Goulet album) =

1964 studio album by Robert Goulet

Manhattan Tower / The Man Who Loves Manhattan

Studio album by Robert Goulet
- Released: 1964
- Genres: Traditional pop; vocal pop
- Length: 32:21
- Label: Columbia
- Producer: Gordon Jenkins

Robert Goulet chronology
This Christmas I Spend With You (1963)	Manhattan Tower / The Man Who Loves Manhattan (1964)	Without You (1964)

Manhattan Tower / The Man Who Loves Manhattan is the sixth studio album by American singer Robert Goulet, released in April 1964, by Columbia Records, and was available both in stereo and mono. It was conductor by Gordon Jenkins. and produced by Jim Foglesong.

it features a new recordings of songs about the life about of Manhattan, while most of the songs are sung by a chours rather than by a soloist and Goulet serves as narrator, gets to really sing only one song, "New York's My Home." the album also features the first recording of the Jenkins composition in stereo."

The album debuted on the Billboard Top LPs chart in the issue dated May 2, 1964, and remained on the chart for 22 weeks, peaking at number 31. It debuted on the Cashbox albums chart in the issue dated April 25, 1964, and remained on the chart for a total of 28 weeks, peaking at number 12.

== Reception ==
Professional ratings
Review scores
Source	Rating
AllMusic	2/5 stars
The Encyclopedia of Popular Music	3/5 stars

Music Vendor notes Goulet "gives a slick, moving reading to the Gordon Jenkins tone (and tune) poem to New York."

Billboard stated Goulet and Jenkins "musically romanticize about the great city and its powerful on the individuals who become a part of it."

Cashbox in its Popular Picks of the Week Reviews believed "this set is sure to get top radio and sales attention."

Variety notes "Robert Goulet handles the narrative and vocal assignment in impressive style, registering with special force in the classic 'New York's My Home' and the ballads and special material."

American Record Guide stated that the album showed "a stylish presentation by Robert Goulet with the orchestra under the driection of [Jenkins'] himself."

In a Biographical Guide to the Great Jazz and Pop Singers, Will Friedwald referred to it as one of "Goulet best moments" It was given a three-star rating by The Encyclopedia of Popular Music, meaning that they believed that album was "Good by Goulet's usual standrands, and therefore recommended. while getting a lower two-star rating from AllMusic. The album also did not receive retrospective reviews.

== Track listing ==
All tracks are written by Gordon Jenkins.

Side one
No.	Title	Length
1.	"Magical City"	5:31
2.	"The Party"	3:07
3.	"New York's My Home"	3:40
4.	"Love in a Tower (Never Leave Me)"	5:28

Side two
No.	Title	Length
1.	"Once Upon A Dream"	3:13
2.	"I'm Learnin' My Latin"	2:41
3.	"Repeat After Me"	2:24
4.	"Married I Can Always Get"	2:21
5.	"Never Leave Me"	3:53

== Charts ==
Chart (1964)	Peak position
US Billboard Top LPs	31
US Cash Box	12
