= The Daydreamer (soundtrack) =

Soundtrack album by cast
- Released: June 9, 1966
- Genre: Soundtrack
- Length: 30:30 (original release); 74:10 (re-release)
- Label: Columbia Records; Percepto Records (reissue)
- Producer: Ernie Altschuler

The Daydreamer was the soundtrack for the 1966 film The Daydreamer which starred Paul O'Keefe, Jack Gilford, Margaret Hamilton and Ray Bolger.

The album was issued on vinyl (both mono and stereo versions) on Columbia Records in 1966. In 2006 the album had an extremely limited release (200 copies) by Percepto Records, which included three demos for unproduced Rankin-Bass films and a lengthy interview with composer Maury Laws conducted by author/historian Rick Goldschmidt. The album cover was slightly altered on the Percepto release and the original liner notes were omitted.

Aside from the title tune, performed by Robert Goulet, it is unclear who provided the vocals on the songs, as the rest are credited to the film's characters rather than the actors who voiced them (and in several instances the singing voices sound nothing like the actors' speaking voices).

== Track listing ==
All the songs are written by Jules Bass and Maury Laws.

Original track listing

1. "Daydreamer" - Robert Goulet -2:47
2. "Overture" - Maury Laws -3:48
3. "Wishes and Teardrops" - The Little Mermaid -3:11
4. "Happy Guy" - Thumbelina -2:09
5. "Isn't It Cozy?" - Three Bats and the Mole -2:01
6. "Tivoli Bells (Papa Anderson's Theme)" - Maury Laws -1:58
7. "Daydreamer" - Chorus and Orchestra -2:24
8. "Luck to Sell" - Paul O'Keefe -2:13
9. "Who Can Tell" - The Pieman of Odense and Big Claus -2:20
10. "Waltz for a Mermaid (Little Mermaid's Theme)" - Maury Laws -1:30
11. "Simply Wonderful" - The Emperor and His Three Ministers -2:08
12. "Voyage of the Walnut Shell (Thumbelina's Theme)" - Maury Laws -1:35
13. "Finale (The Daydreamer)" - Orchestra -2:26

Bonus tracks in reissue

1. "Punch and Judy" -3:11
2. "Champs Elysees" -2:11
3. "Hey Bellhop" -1:25
4. "Author/Historian Rick Goldschmidt Interviews Composer Maury Laws" -36:40
