= Woman, Woman (Robert Goulet album) =

Studio album by Robert Goulet
- Released: July 1968
- Genre: Traditional pop
- Length: 35:44
- Label: Columbia
- Producers: Jack Gold, Jimmy Wisner

Robert Goulet chronology
Hollywood Mon Amour – Great Love Songs from the Movies (1967)	Woman, Woman (1968)	Both Sides Now (1968)

Singles from Woman, Woman
- 1. "What a Wonderful World" Released: May 3, 1968

Woman, Woman is the fifteenth studio album by American singer Robert Goulet, released in July 1968, by Columbia Records, and was available in mono. It was produced by Jack Gold and Jimmy Wisner. It was arranged and conducted by Artie Schroeck , and included the single, "What a Wonderful World". The album featured covers of recent pop hits by Bobby Hebb, Glen Campbell, Bobby Goldsboro, and Gary Puckett & The Union Gap.

== Chart performance ==
The album debuted on the Billboard Top LPs chart in the issue dated September 14, 1968, and remained on the chart for 15 weeks, peaking at number 162. It debuted on the Cash Box albums chart in the issue dated August 31, 1968, and remained on the chart for five weeks, peaking at number 101. It debuted on the Record World Coming Up LP's chart in the issue dated September 7, 1968, and remained on the chart for six weeks, reaching number 102.

The single "What a Wonderful World" debuted on the Billboard Easy Listening chart in the issue dated June 8, 1968, and peaked at number 26 during a six-week stay on it.

== Reception ==
Professional ratings
Review scores
Source	Rating
AllMusic	4/5 stars
The Encyclopedia of Popular Music	4/5 stars

JT Griffith of AllMusic described the album as "A good, dramatic pop album by one of the masters," and noted "It is soft enough to be sweet and bombastic enough to be fun and cheesy."

Billboard said the album showed "Nicely styled collection of top class songs, with a mood of sadness running through them all, maintains the high Goulet quality."

Cash Box noted that Goulet "lends his powerful, dynamic voice to a selection of strong pop tunes," and believed "This set is likely to have appeal for a wide listenership."

Both The Encyclopedia of Popular Music and AllMusic gave the album a four-star ratings.

== Track listing ==
Side One
No.	Title	Writer(s)	Length
1.	"Woman, Woman"	Jim Glaser, Jimmy Payne	3:05
2.	"Live for Life" (from the U.A. release: Live for Life)	Francis Lai, Norman Gimbel	3:15
3.	"This Guy's in Love with You"	Burt Bacharach, Hal David	3:49
4.	"Sunny"	Bobby Hebb	3:23
5.	"Love is Blue"	André Popp, Pierre Cour	2:37
6.	"What a Wonderful World"	Bob Thiele, George David Weiss	2:14

Side Two
No.	Title	Writer(s)	Length
7.	"The Unicorn"	Shel Silverstein	3:45
8.	"By the Time I Get to Phoenix"	Jimmy Webb	2:57
9.	"Do You Know the Way to San Jose"	Burt Bacharach, Hal David	2:45
10.	"Honey (I Miss You)"	Bobby Russell	4:15
11.	"A Man Without Love (Quando m'innamoro)"	Daniele Pace, Mario Panzeri, Roberto Livraghi, Barry Mason	3:34

== Charts ==
Chart peaks for Woman, Woman
Chart (1968)	Peak position
US Top LPs (Billboard)	162
US Cashbox Looking Ahead	101
US Record World Coming Up LP's	102

=== Singles ===
Year	Title	U.S. AC
1968	"What a Wonderful World"	26
