= The Wonderful World of Love =

Studio album by Robert Goulet
- Released: April 1963
- Genre: Traditional pop
- Length: 28:50
- Label: Columbia
- Producer: Jim Foglesong

Robert Goulet chronology
Sincerely Yours... (1962)	The Wonderful World of Love (1963)	Annie Get Your Gun (1963)

The Wonderful World of Love is the fourth studio album by American singer Robert Goulet, released in April 1963, by Columbia Records, and was available both in stereo and mono. It was produced by Jim Foglesong, arranged and conducted by Sid Raminand, contains a mix of ballads old and new, exciting and sentimental romance tunes including "You're Nobody till Somebody Loves You", I'll Take Romance" and "Life Is Just A Bowl Of Cherries".

== Chart performance ==
The album debuted on the Billboard Top LPs chart in the issue dated April 27, 1963, and remained on the chart for 29 weeks, peaking at number 11. It debuted on the Cashbox albums chart in the issue dated April 20, 1963, and remained on the chart for a total of 33 weeks, peaking at number eight.

== Other releases ==
The Wonderful World of Love was included in a box set entitled The Wonderful World of Robert Goulet - The First Four Albums, released on June 23, 2017.

== Critical reception ==
Professional ratings
Review scores
Source	Rating
AllMusic	2.5/5 stars
The Encyclopedia of Popular Music	3/5 stars
Record Mirror	3/5 stars

Billboard selected the album for a "Spotlight Album" review and believed it "should be a powerhouse" for Goulet.

Cashbox notes Goulet's "handles these bold and bluesy tunes with deftness and sureness as he eassays 'I'll Take Romance', and 'Life Is Just A Bowl of Cherries'.

Variety noted "The peg is romance, of course, and Goulet presents it in the masculine manner that's been working so well for him."

American Record Guide notes Goulet "employs good material such as the excellent old Ben Oakland-Oscar Hammerstein 'I'll Take Romance'."

Record Mirror referred to it as a "romantic mood", giving it a three-star rating. It received the same rating from The Encyclopedia of Popular Music, meaning that they believed that album was "Good by Goulet's usual standrands, ane therefore recommended, while getting a lower two.five-star rating from AllMusic.

== Track listing ==
=== Side one ===
No.	Title	Writer(s)	Length
1.	"I'll Take Romance" (from the Columbia Pictures film: I'll Take Romance)	Oscar Hammerstein II, Ben Oakland	2:13
2.	"(I Wanna Go Where You Go, Do What You Do) Then I'll Be Happy"	Cliff Friend, Lew Brown, Sidney Clare	2:21
3.	"S'posin"	Andy Razaf, Paul Denniker	1:57
4.	"You're Nobody till Somebody Loves You"	James Cavanaugh, Russ Morgan, Larry Stock	2:39
5.	"Do It Again" (from the Broadway Musical: The French Doll)	George Gershwin, Buddy DeSylva	2:14
6.	"No Moon At All"	David Mann, Redd Evans	2:43

=== Side two ===
No.	Title	Writer(s)	Length
1.	"Mean to Me"	Fred E. Ahlert, Roy Turk	2:29
2.	"All I Do Is Dream Of You" (from the Metro-Goldwyn-Mayer Pictures film: Sadie McKee)	Nacio Herb Brown, Arthur Freed	2:39
3.	"Out of This World"	Harold Arlen, Johnny Mercer	2:28
4.	"Life Is Just a Bowl of Cherries" (from the Broadway Musical: George White's Scandals of 1931)	Ray Henderson, Lew Brown	1:53
5.	"All of Me"	Gerald Marks, Seymour Simons	2:28
6.	"The Wonderful World of Love"	Jack Brooks, Sid Ramin	2:40

== Charts ==
Chart (1963)	Peak position
US Billboard Top LPs	11
US Cash Box	8
