= Summer Sounds =

Studio album by Robert Goulet
- Released: July 1965
- Genre: Traditional pop
- Length: 29:11
- Label: Columbia
- Producer: Ernie Altschuler

Robert Goulet chronology
Begin to Love (1965)	Summer Sounds (1965)	On Broadway (1965)

Singles from Summer Sounds
- 1. "Summer Sounds" Released: May 10, 1965

Summer Sounds is the tenth studio album by American singer Robert Goulet, released in July 1965, by Columbia Records. and was available both in stereo and mono. It was produced by Ernie Altschuler, it was arranged and conducted by Don Costa. and features the singles, "Summer Sounds".

== Background ==
The album included mix of originals and covers of old standards from the 1930s ("Summertime", "I've Got the World on a String"), 1940s ("Mam'selle",), 1950s (Old Cape Cod", "Till"), and 1961 ("What Now My Love"). as well as his own songs.

== Chart performance ==
The album debuted on the Billboard Top LPs chart in the issue dated August 14, 1965, and remained on the chart for 19 weeks, peaking at number 31. It debuted on the Cash Box albums chart in the issue dated July 17, 1965, and remained on the chart for 26 weeks, peaking at number 17.

The album's title track, debuted on the Hot 100 on June 5, 1965, spending one week at number 58 during a seven-week run. number 43 on the Cash Box singles chart, in an eight-week run on the chart, and number 14 on the Billboard Easy Listening chart during its eight-week run.

== Reception ==
Professional ratings
Review scores
Source	Rating
AllMusic	2.5/5 stars
The Encyclopedia of Popular Music	3/5 stars

Billboard stated Goulet's "revival of ''Mam'selle'' is tender and warmly delivered."

Cashbox notes Goulet "is at his best on this outing, loosing his rich, warm tonsils on a savory and appetizing bill of fare that includes such sturdies as “I’ll Get By” and “Summertime,” as well as the title tune"."

Variety notes "Goulet perfroms a superb French ballad, "Once Upon a Summertime" and the evergreen "Summertime"

Record World notes Goulet "is in superb voice for this collection of standards, topped off by his current single hit", and praised Costa, Ramin, Burns for their "provide superb backing." American Record Guide referred to it as "another finely (Though at times either stuffily or affectedly) sung album."

it was given a three-star rating by The Encyclopedia of Popular Music. AllMusic gave it a two and a half star out of five rating.

== Track listing ==
=== Side one ===
No.	Title	Writer(s)	Length
1.	"Summer Sounds"	Sid Tepper, Roy C. Bennett	2:09
2.	"Old Cape Cod"	Claire Rothrock, Milton Yakus, Allan Jeffrey	3:13
3.	"I've Got the World on a String"	Harold Arlen, Ted Koehler	3:01
4.	"Mam'selle" (from the 20th Century Fox Pictures film: The Razor's Edge)	Edmund Goulding, Mack Gordon	2:51
5.	"I'll Get By (As Long as I Have You)"	Fred E. Ahlert, Roy Turk	2:51
6.	"Till"	Charles Danvers, Carl Sigman	2:12

=== Side two ===
No.	Title	Writer(s)	Length
1.	"Walk Into The Dawn"	Lion Bart	2:08
2.	"Once Upon a Summertime (La valse des lilas)"	Johnny Mercer, Michel Legrand, Eddie Barclay and Eddy Marnay	2:26
3.	"What Now My Love (Et maintenant)"	Pierre Delanoë, [Carl Sigman]], Gilbert Bécaud	2:55
4.	"If You Love Me (Really Love Me) (Hymne à l'amour)"	Marguerite Monnot, Édith Piaf, Geoffrey Parsons	2:21
5.	"Summertime" (from the Broadway Musical: "Porgy and Bess")	George Gershwin, DuBose Heyward	2:59

== Charts ==
Chart (1965)	Peak position
US Billboard Top LPs	31
US Cash Box	17

Singles

Year	Single	Chart	Peak
1965	"Summer Sounds"	US Billboard Hot 100	58
1965	"Summer Sounds"	US Cash Box	43
1965	"Summer Sounds"	US Easy Listening	14
