= Without You (Robert Goulet album) =

Studio album by Robert Goulet
- Released: September 1964
- Genre: Traditional pop
- Length: 35:11
- Label: Columbia
- Producer: Jim Foglesong

Robert Goulet chronology
Manhattan Tower / The Man Who Loves Manhattan (1964)	Without You (1964)	My Love Forgive Me (1964)

Without You is the seventh studio album by American singer Robert Goulet, released in September 1964, by Columbia Records. and was available both in stereo and mono. It was produced by Jim Foglesong. it was arranged and conducted by Sid Ramin.

== Background ==
the album included mix of originals and covers of old standards from the 1930s ("I'll Be Seeing You"), 1940s ("Lush Life", "Autumn Leaves"), 1951 ("I'm a Fool to Want You" and 1962 ("Once Upon a Time") as well as his own songs.

== Chart performance ==
The album debuted on the Billboard Top LPs chart in the issue dated October 17, 1964, and remained on the chart for 16 weeks, peaking at number 72. It debuted on the Cashbox albums charts in the issue dated April 25, 1964, and remained on the chart for a total of 24 weeks, peaking at number 29 on the Top 50 Stereo one, while reaching a lower number 38 on the Top 100 Monaural Albums chart.

== Reception ==
Professional ratings
Review scores
Source	Rating
AllMusic	2.5/5 stars
The Encyclopedia of Popular Music	3/5 stars

Record World notes Goulet's "dramatic, full baritone takes on an added heartbroken quality that serves him well."

Billboard notes "The collections of songs are great crowd pleasers, too. Included are 'Where Are You?', 'Autumn Leaves', 'I'll Be Seeing You', 'What's New?', 'Where Is the One'."

Cashbox notes: "The rich-voiced Goulet's delivery of these melodic gems is almost effortless. In addition to a collection of years-back favorites."

Variety reported that the album showed Goulet "high-ranging performance of 'I'll Be Seeing You' is one of the highlights of this collection." It was given a three-star rating by The Encyclopedia of Popular Music, meaning that they believed that album was "Good by Goulet's usual standrands, and therefore recommended," while AllMusic gave it a two and a half star out of five rating.

== Track listing ==
=== Side one ===
No.	Title	Writer(s)	Length
1.	"Where Is The One"	Alec Wilder, Edwin Finckel	2:57
2.	"I'll Be Seeing You" (from the Broadway Musical: Right This Way)	Sammy Fain, Irving Kahal	2:23
3.	"Sad Songs"	Tony Velona	2:55
4.	"Once Upon a Time" (from the Broadway Musical: All Musical)	Charles Strouse, Lee Adams	3:20
5.	"Autumn Leaves"	Joseph Kosma, Johnny Mercer, Jacques Prévert	2:52
6.	"My Lady Won't Be Here Tonight"	F. Parker, Ludwig Flato, Moe Jaffe	2:21

=== Side two ===
No.	Title	Writer(s)	Length
1.	"Without You"	Jerry Bresler, Lyn Duddy	3:10
2.	"Don't Worry 'Bout Me"	Rube Bloom, Ted Koehler	3:04
3.	"What's New?"	Bob Haggart, Johnny Burke	2:46
4.	"I'm a Fool to Want You"	Frank Sinatra, Jack Wolf, and Joel Herron	2:41
5.	"Lush Life"	Billy Strayhorn	3:29
6.	"Where Are You?" (from the Universal Pictures film: Top of the Town)	Jimmy McHugh, Harold Adamson	2:53

== Charts ==
Chart peaks for Without You
Chart (1964)	Peak position
US Billboard Top LPs	72
US Cashbox Top 100 Monaural Albums	38
US Cashbox Top 50 Stereo	29
