= List of number-one hits of 1964 (Brazil) =

This is a list of the songs that reached number one in Brazil in 1964, according to Cashbox magazine with data provided by the Brazilian Institute of Public Opinion and Statistics.

Issue date	Song	Artist(s)
January 4	"Acorrentados"	Agnaldo Rayol
January 11	"Acorrentados"	Agnaldo Rayol
February 29	"Dominique"	Giane
March 7	"Dominique"	Giane
March 14	"Dominique"	Giane
March 21	"Dominique"	Giane
March 28	"Dominique"	Giane
April 4	"Dominique"	Giane
April 11	"Dominique"	Giane
April 18	"Io che amo solo te"	Sergio Endrigo
April 25	"Io che amo solo te"	Sergio Endrigo
May 2	"Io che amo solo te"	Sergio Endrigo
May 9	"Io che amo solo te"	Sergio Endrigo
May 16	"Io che amo solo te"	Sergio Endrigo
May 23	"Io che amo solo te"	Sergio Endrigo
May 30	"Io che amo solo te"	Sergio Endrigo
June 6	"Io che amo solo te"	Sergio Endrigo
June 13	"O Ritmo da Chuva"	Demétrius
June 20	"Rua Augusta"	Ronnie Cord
June 27	"O Divórcio"	Oslain Galvão
July 4	"Io che amo solo te"	Sergio Endrigo
July 11	"Que Queres Tu de Mim"	Altemar Dutra
July 25	"Datemi un martello"	Rita Pavone
August 1	"Datemi un martello"	Rita Pavone
August 8	"Datemi un martello"	Rita Pavone
August 15	"Datemi un martello"	Rita Pavone
August 22	"Datemi un martello"	Rita Pavone
August 29	"Datemi un martello"	Rita Pavone
September 5	"Datemi un martello"	Rita Pavone
September 12	"Datemi un martello"	Rita Pavone
September 26	"Datemi un martello"	Rita Pavone
October 3	"Datemi un martello"	Rita Pavone
October 10	"Datemi un martello"	Rita Pavone
October 17	"Datemi un martello"	Rita Pavone
October 24	"Deixa Isso Pra Lá"	Jair Rodrigues
October 31	"Deixa Isso Pra Lá"	Jair Rodrigues
November 7	"Deixa Isso Pra Lá"	Jair Rodrigues
November 21	"Deixa Isso Pra Lá"	Jair Rodrigues
November 28	"Deixa Isso Pra Lá"	Jair Rodrigues
December 5	"My Boy Lollipop"	Millie Small
December 12	"Deixa Isso Pra Lá"	Jair Rodrigues
December 19	"Deixa Isso Pra Lá"	Jair Rodrigues

== See also ==
- 1964 in music
- List of number-one hits of 1965 (Brazil)
- List of number-one hits of 1966 (Brazil)
