= Hollywood Mon Amour – Great Love Songs from the Movies =

Hollywood Mon Amour - Great Love Songs From The Movies

Studio album by Robert Goulet
- Released: September 1967
- Genre: Traditional pop
- Length: 34:21
- Label: Columbia
- Producer: Robert Mersey

Robert Goulet chronology
| On Broadway, Vol. 2 (1967) | Hollywood Mon Amour - Great Love Songs From The Movies (1967) | Woman, Woman (1968) |

Singles from Hollywood Mon Amour - Great Love Songs From The Movies
- 1. "Mon Amour...Mon Amour" Released: September 21, 1967

Hollywood Mon Amour - Great Love Songs From The Movies is the fourteenth studio album by American singer Robert Goulet, released in September 1967 by Columbia Records. It was available both in stereo and mono. The album was arranged, conducted, and produced by Robert Mersey.

== Background ==
It features songs from the soundtracks of then current and/or recent motion pictures including 1960's Exodus ("The Exodus Song (This is Mine)", High Time ("The Second Time Around"), 1965's Doctor Zhivago ("Somewhere, My Love"), and 1966's A Man and a Woman (namesake "A Man and a Woman"). The only single from the album was "Mon Amour...Mon Amour".

== Chart performance ==
This was his first solo studio album out of 14 released by Columbia that didn't make either the Billboard 200 nor Christmas Albums charts, but instead entered the Cashbox albums chart in the issue dated October 7, 1967. The album spent a week on the charts, peaking at number 96. The album also debuted on Record World magazine's LP's Coming Up chart in the issue dated October 14, 1967, peaking at No. 109 during a longer nine-week run.

== Other releases ==
Ten of the 11 songs of Hollywood Mon Amour - Great Love Songs From The Movies were released as part of the box set entitled Robert Goulet Collection, released on June 15, 2004.

== Reception ==
Professional ratings
Review scores
| Source | Rating |
|---|---|
| The Encyclopedia of Popular Music | 3/5 stars |

Variety noted that "Robert Goulet's powerful pipes are showcased here in a program of film songs, the type of material he does very effectively."

Billboard praised "Robert Merset's arrangements complement a strong vocal job on Goulet's part."

Cashbox believed Goulet's "voice is rich and warm, and the album should become a favorite with his followers."

Honolulu Star-Advertiser stated that the album "is a lyrical, tender assortment of movie tunes", and that "A Man and a Woman" "sets the mood."

Record World in its Pick Hits album reviews described the album as "glossy". It was given a three-star rating by The Encyclopedia of Popular Music as well, meaning that they believed that album was "Good by the Goulet's usual standrands, and therefore recommended.

== Track listing ==
=== Side one ===
| No. | Title | Writer(s) | Length |
|---|---|---|---|
| 1. | "A Man and a Woman" (from the U.A. release: A Man and a Woman) | Alan Jay Lerner, Frederick Loewe, Francis Lai | 3:23 |
| 2. | "A Time for Love" (from the Warner Bros. Pictures film: An American Dream) | Johnny Mandel, Paul Francis Webster | 3:27 |
| 3. | "The Second Time Around" (from the 20th Century Fox Pictures film: High Time) | Sammy Cahn, Jimmy Van Heusen | 3:10 |
| 4. | "This Year" (from the Warner Bros. Pictures film: Hotel) | Johnny Keating, Jack Worth | 2:51 |
| 5. | "Invitation" (from the Metro Goldwyn Mayer Pictures film: Invitation) | Bronisław Kaper, Paul Francis Webster | 3:07 |
| 6. | "The Exodus Song (This Land Is Mine)" (from the U.A. release: Exodus) | Pat Boone, Ernest Gold | 3:21 |

=== Side two ===
| No. | Title | Writer(s) | Length |
|---|---|---|---|
| 1. | "Laura" (from the 20th Century Fox Pictures film: Laura) | Johnny Mercer, David Raksin | 3:07 |
| 2. | "Somewhere My Love (Lara's Theme)" (from the Metro-Goldwyn-Mayer Pictures film: Doctor Zhivago) | Paul Francis Webster, Maurice Jarre | 3:00 |
| 3. | "Mon Amour... Mon Amour" (from the Cocinor Pictures film Mon Amour... Mon Amour) | Francis Lai, Pierre Barouh, Carl Sigman | 2:42 |
| 4. | "Days of Love" (from the 20th Century Fox Pictures film: Hombre) | Paul Francis Webster, David Rose | 3:07 |
| 5. | "Temptation" (from the Metro Goldwyn Mayer Pictures film: Going Hollywood) | Nacio Herb Brown, Arthur Freed | 3:25 |

== Charts ==
Chart peaks for Hollywood Mon Amour – Great Love Songs from the Movies
| Chart (1967) | Peak position |
|---|---|
| US Cashbox Top 100 Albums | 96 |
| US Record World LP's Coming Up | 109 |
