= Two of Us (Robert Goulet album) =

Studio album by Robert Goulet
- Released: August 1962
- Genres: Traditional pop; vocal pop
- Length: 36:01
- Label: Columbia
- Producer: Jim Foglesong

Robert Goulet chronology
Always You (1961)	Two of Us (1962)	Sincerely Yours... (1962)

Singles from Two of Us
- 1. "Where Do I Go from Here?" Released: August 10, 1962; 2. "Two of Us" Released: March 16, 1963

Two of Us is the second studio album by American singer Robert Goulet, released in August 1962 by Columbia Records, and was available both in stereo and mono. It was produced by Jim Foglesong.

== Chart performance ==
The album debuted on the Billboard Top LPs chart in the issue dated September 1, 1962, and remained on the chart for 55 weeks, peaking at number 20. It debuted on the Cashbox albums chart in the issue dated August 25, 1962, and remained on the chart for a total of 38 weeks, peaking at number 17.

The single from the album, "Two of Us" bubbled under" Billboard's Hot 100, for its sole week in the issue dated April 13, 1963, reaching number 132.

== Other releases ==
The album was released on compact disc as one of two albums on one CD by Columbia Records on March 31, 2003, as tracks 1 through 12 with tracks 13 through 24 consisting of Goulet's Columbia 1965 album, Begin to Love. Two of Us was included in a box set entitled The Wonderful World of Robert Goulet - The First Four Albums, released on June 23, 2017.

== Critical reception ==
Professional ratings
Review scores
Source	Rating
AllMusic	4/5 stars
The Encyclopedia of Popular Music	3/5 stars

Billboard notes Goulet "turns in heartfelt performance of a flock of cozy, intimate songs over pretty support from the Glenn Osser ork". Cashbox stated "Goulet's has a big voice but modulates it to create an atmosphere of intimacy in this session of standards and show tunes". Variety claims "The style is soft and easy with the help of Glenn Osser, who conducts the orch[estra] and arranged the songbag, Goulet does very well by some showtunes and straight pop entries." American Record Guide referred to it as a "pleasant album".

William Ruhlmann of AllMusic stated that Two of Us presented Goulet with some good material to use in that effort. Arranger/conductor Glenn Osser wisely played down the boom in Goulet's voice, using him instead in a well-chosen selection of romantic ballads and, even when turning to a rhythm tune like Johnny Mercer's 'Something's Gotta Give' from the film Daddy Long Legs, having Goulet undersing the potentially aggressive lyric, giving the album a four-star rating." It was given a three-star rating by The Encyclopedia of Popular Music, meaning that they believed that album was "Good by Goulet's usual standrands, ane therefore recommended

== Track listing ==
=== Side one ===
No.	Title	Writer(s)	Length
1.	"Two Of Us"	Tony Velona	2:43
2.	"Something's Gotta Give" (from the 20th Century Fox Pictures film: Daddy Long Legs)	Johnny Mercer	3:25
3.	"But Beautiful" (from the Paramount Pictures film: Road to Rio)	Jimmy Van Heusen, Johnny Burke	3:05
4.	"Don't Blame Me" (from the Broadway Musical: "Clowns in Clover")	Jimmy McHugh, Dorothy Fields	2:30
5.	"Where Do I Go from Here?"	Jerry Bock, Sheldon Harnick	2:53
6.	"Here's That Rainy Day" (from the Broadway Musical: "Carnival in Flanders")	Jimmy Van Heusen, Johnny Burke	3:10

=== Side two ===
No.	Title	Writer(s)	Length
1.	"All of You" (from the Broadway Musical: "Silk Stockings")	Cole Porter	3:23
2.	"Goodbye"	Gordon Jenkins	3:11
3.	"Make Someone Happy" (from the Broadway Musical: "Do Re Mi")	Jule Styne, Betty Comden, Adolph Green	3:02
4.	"Take Me in Your Arms"	Fred Markush, Mitchell Parish	2:50
5.	"Little White Lies"	Walter Donaldson	2:43
6.	"I Wish You Love"	Albert A. Beach, Charles Trenet	3:06

== Charts ==
=== Album ===
Chart (1962)	Peak position
U.S. Top LPs (Billboard)	20
U.S. Cashbox	17

=== Singles ===
Year	Title	U.S. Hot 100
1963	"Two of Us"	133
