= Sincerely Yours... (Robert Goulet album) =

Studio album by Robert Goulet
- Released: December 1962
- Genre: Traditional pop
- Length: 33:52
- Label: Columbia
- Producer: Jim Foglesong

Robert Goulet chronology
Two of Us (1962)	Sincerely Yours... (1962)	The Wonderful World of Love (1963)

Sincerely Yours... is the third studio album by American singer Robert Goulet, released in December 1962, by Columbia Records, and was available both in stereo and mono. It was produced by Jim Foglesong.

== Background ==
the album included mix of originals and covers of old standards from the 1930s ("The Nearness of You, "Poinciana (Song of the Trees)"), 1940s ("Stella by Starlight", "You Stepped Out of a Dream), and the 1950s (Another Time, Another Place", and "Gigi)

== Chart performance ==
The album debuted on the Billboard Top LPs chart in the issue dated January 5, 1963, and remained on the chart for 48 weeks, peaking at number nine. It debuted on the Cashbox albums chart in the issue dated December 29, 1962, and remained on the chart for a total of 57 weeks, peaking at number six.

== Other releases ==
The album was released on compact disc as one of two albums on one CD by Collectables Records on July 1, 1997, as tracks 13 through 24 with tracks 1 through 12 consisting of Goulet's Columbia 1964 album, My Love Forgive Me. Sincerely Yours... was included in a box set entitled The Wonderful World of Robert Goulet - The First Four Albums, released on June 23, 2017.

== Critical reception ==
Professional ratings
Review scores
Source	Rating
AllMusic	3/5 stars
New Record Mirror	3/5 stars
The Encyclopedia of Popular Music	4/5 stars
Disc	5/5 stars

Billboard described the album as "A highly salable item" and notes "there are a dozen fine, moody ballads done with much warmth and charm." Cashbox believed "Goulet displays a dynamic vocal talent and a smooth handling of lyric that could [made] this his best-selling album to date" Variety notes "Goulet sticks to the romantic mood and pours it out for all its worth" New Record Mirror says the combination of Goulet's "rich baritone voice" with a collection of good songs with good arrangements "adds up...to disc success", like AllMusic, it also received three-star rating. Nigel Hunter of Disc believed "Sid Ramin's arrangements and lush accompaniments show off [Goulet's] voice and these first-class pop songs to perfection without getting busy or ostentatious, giving it five-star rating." It received the four-star rating from The Encyclopedia of Popular Music, meaning that they believed that album was "A high standard album from Goulet, and therefore highly recommended.

Pemberton Roach of AllMusic said the album "showed Goulet fully realizes a complete visual and musical iconography all his own. If you ever wondered what the world was like when [Robert] Goulet was not considered cheesy, this album might give you a glimpse. Though it's not a great piece of art, in some ways Sincerely Yours is as much an important historical document as an album like Sgt. Pepper's Lonely Hearts Club Band, giving the album a three-star rating."

== Track listing ==
=== Side one ===
No.	Title	Writer(s)	Length
1.	"I Talk to the Trees" (from the Broadway musical: Paint Your Wagon)	Alan Jay Lerner, Frederick Loewe	3:00
2.	"The Nearness of You"	Hoagy Carmichael, Ned Washington	2:33
3.	"Tonight" (from the U.A. release: West Side Story)	Leonard Bernstein, Stephen Sondheim	2:30
4.	"Another Time, Another Place" (from the Paramount Pictures film: Another Time, Another Place)	Jay Livingston, Ray Evans	3:04
5.	"Poinciana (Song of the Trees)"	Nat Simon, Buddy Bernier, Manuel Lliso	2:56
6.	"Ebb Tide"	Carl Sigman, Robert Maxwell	3:13

=== Side two ===
No.	Title	Writer(s)	Length
1.	"The Moon Was Yellow"	Edgar Leslie, Fred E. Ahlert	2:05
2.	"You Stepped Out of a Dream" (from the Metro-Goldwyn-Mayer Pictures film: Ziegfeld Girl)	Nacio Herb Brown, Gus Kahn	2:12
3.	"Two People"	W. M. Angelos, Buz Kohan	2:30
4.	"Maria" (from the U.A. release: West Side Story)	Leonard Bernstein, Stephen Sondheim	3:07
5.	"Gigi" (from the Metro Goldwyn Mayer Pictures film: Gigi)	Alan Jay Lerner, Frederick Loewe	3:22
6.	"Stella by Starlight" (from the Paramount Pictures film: The Uninvited)	Ned Washington, Victor Young	3:06

== Charts ==
Chart (1962–1963)	Peak position
US Billboard Top LPs	9
US Cash Box	6
