= List of number-one hits of 1966 (Brazil) =

This is a list of the songs that reached number one in Brazil in 1966, according to Cashbox magazine with data provided by the Brazilian Institute of Public Opinion and Statistics.

| Issue date | Song | Artist(s) |
|---|---|---|
| January 29 | "Quero que vá tudo pro inferno" | Roberto Carlos |
| February 5 | "Quero que vá tudo pro inferno" | Roberto Carlos |
| February 12 | "Quero que vá tudo pro inferno" | Roberto Carlos |
| February 19 | "Quero que vá tudo pro inferno" | Roberto Carlos |
| February 26 | "Quero que vá tudo pro inferno" | Roberto Carlos |
| March 5 | "Quero que vá tudo pro inferno" | Roberto Carlos |
| March 12 | "Quero que vá tudo pro inferno" | Roberto Carlos |
| March 26 | "Quero que vá tudo pro inferno" | Roberto Carlos |
| April 2 | "Quero que vá tudo pro inferno" | Roberto Carlos |
| April 16 | "Quero que vá tudo pro inferno" | Roberto Carlos |
| April 23 | "Quero que vá tudo pro inferno" | Roberto Carlos |
| April 30 | "Quero que vá tudo pro inferno" | Roberto Carlos |
| May 7 | "Quero que vá tudo pro inferno" | Roberto Carlos |
| May 14 | "Quero que vá tudo pro inferno" | Roberto Carlos |
| May 21 | "Quero que vá tudo pro inferno" | Roberto Carlos |
| May 28 | "Michelle" | Billy Vaughn |
| June 4 | "Michelle" | Billy Vaughn |
| June 11 | "Michelle" | Billy Vaughn |
| June 18 | "Michelle" | Billy Vaughn |
| June 25 | "Michelle" | Billy Vaughn |
| July 2 | "Michelle" | Billy Vaughn |
| July 9 | "Tristeza" | Jair Rodrigues |
| July 16 | "Tristeza" | Jair Rodrigues |
| July 23 | "Tristeza" | Jair Rodrigues |
| July 30 | "Tristeza" | Jair Rodrigues |
| August 6 | "Tristeza" | Jair Rodrigues |
| August 13 | "Tristeza" | Jair Rodrigues |
| August 20 | "Tristeza" | Jair Rodrigues |
| August 27 | "Tristeza" | Jair Rodrigues |
| September 3 | "California Dreamin'" | The Mamas & the Papas |
| September 10 | "California Dreamin'" | The Mamas & the Papas |
| September 17 | "California Dreamin'" | The Mamas & the Papas |
| September 24 | "California Dreamin'" | The Mamas & the Papas |
| October 1 | "Esqueça" | Roberto Carlos |
| October 8 | "Esqueça" | Roberto Carlos |
| October 15 | "Strangers in the Night" | Frank Sinatra |
| October 22 | "Strangers in the Night" | Frank Sinatra |
| October 29 | "Strangers in the Night" | Frank Sinatra |
| November 5 | "Strangers in the Night" | Frank Sinatra |
| November 12 | "Strangers in the Night" | Frank Sinatra |
| November 19 | "A Banda (Ah Bahn-da)" | Chico Buarque |
| December 3 | "A Banda (Ah Bahn-da)" | Chico Buarque |
| December 10 | "A Banda (Ah Bahn-da)" | Chico Buarque |
| December 17 | "A Banda (Ah Bahn-da)" | Chico Buarque |
| December 24 | "Disparada" | Jair Rodrigues |
| December 31 | "Disparada" | Jair Rodrigues |

== See also ==
- List of number-one hits of 1964 (Brazil)
- List of number-one hits of 1965 (Brazil)
- 1966 in music
