= Agnaldo Rayol =

Brazilian singer and actor (1938–2024)

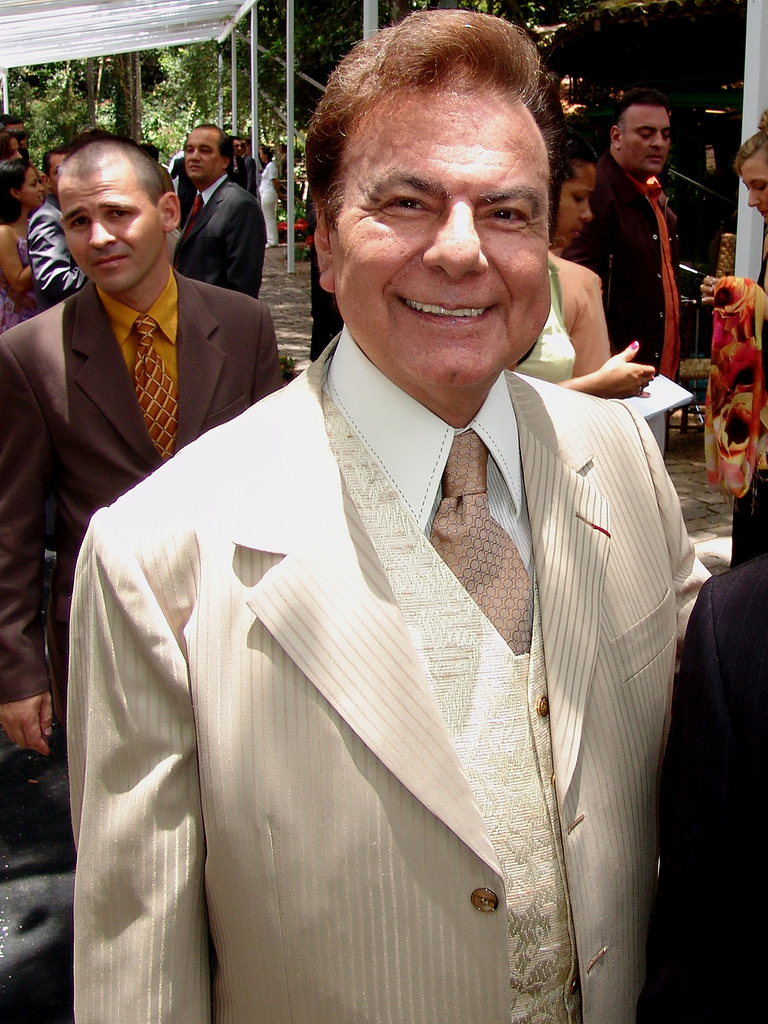
- Rayol in 2005

Background information
- Born: Agnaldo Coniglio Rayol; May 3, 1938; Niterói, Rio de Janeiro, Brazil
- Died: November 4, 2024 (aged 86) São Paulo, Brazil
- Occupation: Singer

Agnaldo Coniglio Rayol (born May 3, 1938 – November 4, 2024) was a Brazilian singer and actor. He sang love ballads and romantic music in general, with an emphasis on Italian songs.

Rayol died on November 4, 2024, at the age of 86, following complications from a fall at his house in Santana, São Paulo.

== Filmography ==
- 2004 – Olga del Volga
- 1976 – Possuída Pelo Pecado
- 1971 – A Herança
- 1970 – A Moreninha
- 1968 – Agnaldo, Perigo à Vista
- 1961 – Tristeza do Jeca
- 1960 – Zé do Periquito
- 1960 – Pistoleiro Bossa Nova
- 1959 – Garota Enxuta
- 1959 – Jeca Tatu
- 1958 – Uma Certa Lucrécia
- 1958 – Chofer de Praça
- 1951 – Maior Que o Ódio
- 1949 – Também Somos Irmãos
