= Amore scusami =

1964 song performed by John Foster

Single by John Foster
- B-side: "Dedicata a Paola"
- Released: April 1964
- Genre: Pop
- Label: Style
- Songwriters: Gino Mescoli, Vito Pallavicini

John Foster singles chronology
| "Ed ora insegnami" (1964) | "Amore scusami" (1964) | "Io e te" (1964) |

"My Love, Forgive Me"

Single by Robert Goulet

from the album My Love, Forgive Me
- B-side: "I'd Rather Be Rich"
- Released: September 4, 1964
- Recorded: 1964
- Studio: Columbia 30th Street Studio, New York City
- Genre: Traditional pop
- Length: 2:47
- Label: Columbia 4-43131
- Songwriters: Gino Mescoli, Vito Pallavicini, Sydney Lee
- Producer: Ernie Altschuler

Robert Goulet singles chronology
| "Too Good" (1964) | "My Love, Forgive Me" (1964) | "I Never Got To Paris" (1965) |

"Amore scusami" is a 1964 song composed by Gino Mescoli and Vito Pallavicini. The song premiered at the Un disco per l'estate music festival with a performance of John Foster, and then got an immediate commercial success, peaking at third place on the Italian hit parade and remaining in the top ten for five months.

== Background ==
The song portrays the crisis of a sentimental relationship, and it is regarded as an innovation for the Italian music of the time for its realistic lyrics and for the absence of pathetic and pitiful tones.

== Cover versions ==
It was later covered by numerous artists, including:

- Rita Pavone
- Dalida
- Jula De Palma
- Rosanna Fratello
- Giuseppe Di Stefano
- Fausto Papetti
- Jerry Adriani (Brazilian Singer)
- Elvina Makarian (Armenian Jazz singer)
- Andre Hazes (Dutch Singer)

"Amore scusami" was adapted in French by Dalida "Amore scusami" was adapted in English as "My Love, Forgive Me" by Sydney Lee and was recorded by:

- Robert Goulet whose 1964 recording peaked at number sixteen on the Hot 100, number three on the Middle-of-the-Road Singles chart, and number 22 in Canada.
- Jerry Vale whose 1967 recording was taken from his from album Time Alone Will Tell and Other Great Hits of Today and reached number 25 on the US Easy Listening chart in mid 1968.
- Lovelace Watkins
- The Ray Charles Singers
- Patrizio Buanne in The Italian (2005)
- Peggy Lee

== Track listing ==
7" single – STMS 588

1. "Amore scusami" (Gino Mescoli, Vito Pallavicini)
2. "Dedicata a Paola" (Bruno Lauzi, Maggiorino Icardi, Elio Isola)

== Charts ==
| Chart (1964–65) | Peak position |
|---|---|
| Argentina (CAPIF) | 1 |
| Belgium (Ultratop 50 Flanders) | 11 |
| Belgium (Ultratop 50 Wallonia) | 12 |
| Brazil (IBOPE) | 1 |
| Italy (Musica e dischi) | 3 |
