= Franco IV e Franco I =

Italian musical duo

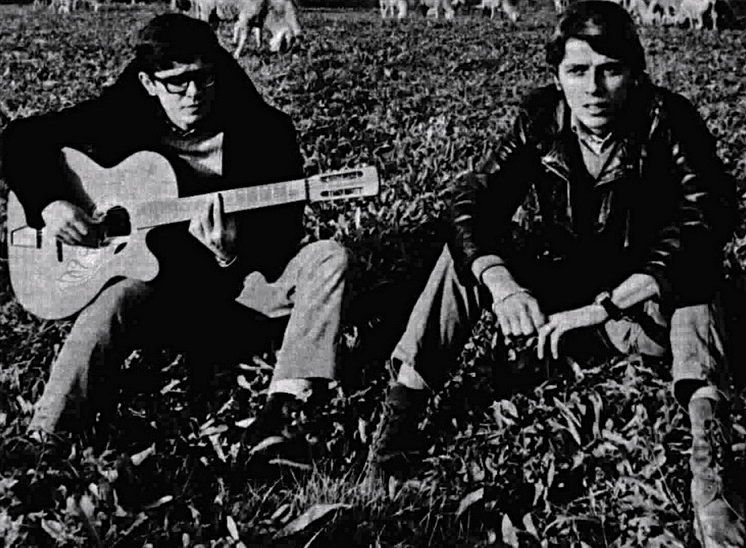
Franco IV e Franco I in Radiocorriere magazine, 1968.

Franco IV e Franco I were an Italian pop musical and vocal duo, active between the 1960s and the early 1970s.

== Career ==
The duo consisted of Francesco "Franco" Romano (born in Naples on 26 July 1946) and Francesco "Franco" Calabrese (born in Naples on 10 March 1943). They started performing under their birth names in the early 1960s, in music halls and clubs of Amalfi Coast. Initially the duo had a repertoire of cover songs, mainly classics of the Canzone Napoletana, rearranged in a modern beat style.

In 1968, shortly after adopting their stage name and starting to record original songs, they got a large success with the song "Ho scritto t'amo sulla sabbia", which reached the first place and stayed sixteen weeks in the top ten of the Italian hit parade.

After a number of minor hits, the duo disbanded in the early 1970s as Romano decided to abandon his music career to pursue his studies. Calabrese continued his musical career, recording some singles and continuing on performing live.

== Discography ==
Album

- 1968 - Franco IV e Franco I (Style, STMS 8067)
- 1970 - Franco IV e Franco I (Style, STMS 8068)
