= Always You (Robert Goulet album) =

Studio album by Robert Goulet
- Released: September 1961
- Genres: Traditional pop; vocal pop
- Length: 36:35
- Label: Columbia Records
- Producer: Frank De Vol

Robert Goulet chronology
Always You (1961)	Two of Us (1962)

Always You is a debut album by American singer Robert Goulet, released in September 1961, by Columbia Records. and was available both in stereo and mono. It was produced by Frank De Vol. AllMusic's William Ruhlmann explained that Columbia producer Frank DeVol took advantage of that voice on Always You, having Goulet record show tunes and old-time standards and bathing them all in string arrangements that [Goulet's] had no trouble dominating.

The album debuted on the Billboard Top LPs chart in the issue dated March 17, 1962, and remained on the chart for 65 weeks, peaking at number 43..

The album was released on compact disc as one of two albums on one CD by Collectables Records on February 5, 2002, as tracks 1 through 12 with tracks 13 through 24 consisting of Goulet's Columbia 1963 live album, In Person. Always You was included in a box set entitled The Wonderful World of Robert Goulet - The First Four Albums, released on June 23, 2017.

== Reception ==
Professional ratings
Review scores
Source	Rating
AllMusic	3/5 stars
The Encyclopedia of Popular Music	3/5 stars

JT Griffith of AllMusic believed "The album's focus is of a jazz crooner nature, not a swinging one. There is not a single tongue-in-cheek note on Always You, rather every song fits into that Jackie Gleason genre of heart-felt sentiment similar to Music to Make You Misty or Songs for Young Lovers. Standout tracks include "Strange Music," "Always You," and "You're Breaking My Heart."

Billboard stated the "Selections" of songs throughout the album, "all wrapped up in a rich, feelingful baritone, include 'The Lamp Is Low", "Strange Music," "The Breeze and I," and other poignant oldies.

Cashbox states that Goulet "Baritone’s typically legit voice has excellent range and pitch in 'And This Is My Beloved', 'It’s All In The Game', and 'Always You'."

Variety notes Goulet's "baritone style is legit and strong and taliormade for the repertoire that includes such hefty items as 'Strange Music' and 'The Lamp is Low'.' Both The Encyclopedia of Popular Music and AllMusic gave the album a three-star rating as well, the latter's rating meaning they believed the album was "Good by Goulet's usual standrands, and therefore recommended.

== Track listing ==
=== Side one ===
No.	Title	Writer(s)	Length
1.	"The Lamp Is Low"	Mitchell Parish, Peter DeRose, Bert Shefter	3:05
2.	"And This Is My Beloved" (from the Broadway Musical: Kismet)	Alexander Borodin, Robert Wright, George Forrest	2:24
3.	"You're Breaking My Heart"	Pat Genaro, Sunny Skylar, Ruggero Leoncavallo	2:59
4.	"It's All in the Game"	Charles G. Dawes, Carl Sigman	3:28
5.	"Full Moon and Empty Arms"	Buddy Kaye, Ted Mossman	2:37
6.	"The Breeze and I"	Ernesto Lecuona, Al Stillman	2:51

=== Side two ===
No.	Title	Writer(s)	Length
1.	"Strange Music"	George Forrest, Edvard Grieg, Robert Wright	3:02
2.	"Always You"	Will Jason, Sid Robin, Pyotr Ilyich Tchaikovsky	2:57
3.	"Here"	Dorcas Cochran, Francesco Maria Piave, Henri René, Giuseppe Verdi	3:09
4.	"The Things I Love"	Harold Barlow, Lew Harris, Pyotr Ilyich Tchaikovsky	3:23
5.	"The Story Of A Starry Night"	Al Hoffman, Jerry Livingston, Mann Curtis	3:21
6.	"If You Are But a Dream" (from the RKO Pictures film: The House I Live In)	Nathan J. Bonx, Jack Fulton, Moe Jaffe	3:15

== Charts ==
Chart (1962)	Peak position
US Billboard Top LPs	43
