= John Foster (Italian singer) =

Italian singer and journalist

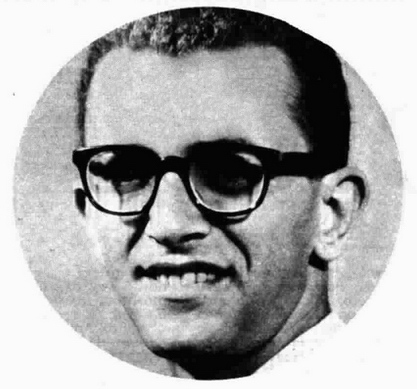
- Born: Paolo Occhipinti; 23 August 1939 (age 87); Milan, Italy
- Occupation: Singer

Paolo Occhipinti (born 23 August 1939), best known as John Foster, is an Italian former singer and journalist.

== Life and career ==
Born in Milan, Occhipinti had already a professional career as a musical critic and a journalist when he started singing in an amateur band. Put under contract by the label Phonocolor in the late 1950s, he adopted the stage name John Foster. He initially specialized in cover versions of American songs, in particularly from the repertoire of Ray Charles.

Foster got his first hit in 1963, with the song "Eri un'abitudine" (Can't Get Used to Losing You), which ranked #5 on the Italian hit parade. Foster's major hit was "Amore scusami", his entry to the 1964 Un disco per l'estate competition; the single peaked third on the Italian charts and was subsequently covered by dozens of artists, including Rita Pavone, Dalida, Robert Goulet and Jerry Vale (with the title "My Love, Forgive Me").

In 1965 and in 1966 Foster entered the main competition at the Sanremo Music Festival with the songs "Cominciamo ad amarci" and "Se questo ballo non finisse mai". In the late 1960s, he left the music industry and resumed his work as a journalist. Between 1976 and 2005 he was the editor of the weekly magazine Oggi.

== Discography ==
Album

- 1963: I successi di John Foster (Style, STLP 8052)
- 1964: Nel mondo dei giovani (Style, STLP 8054)
- 1965: Cominciamo ad amarci (Style, STLP 8055)
