= Robert Goulet =

American singer and actor (1933–2007)

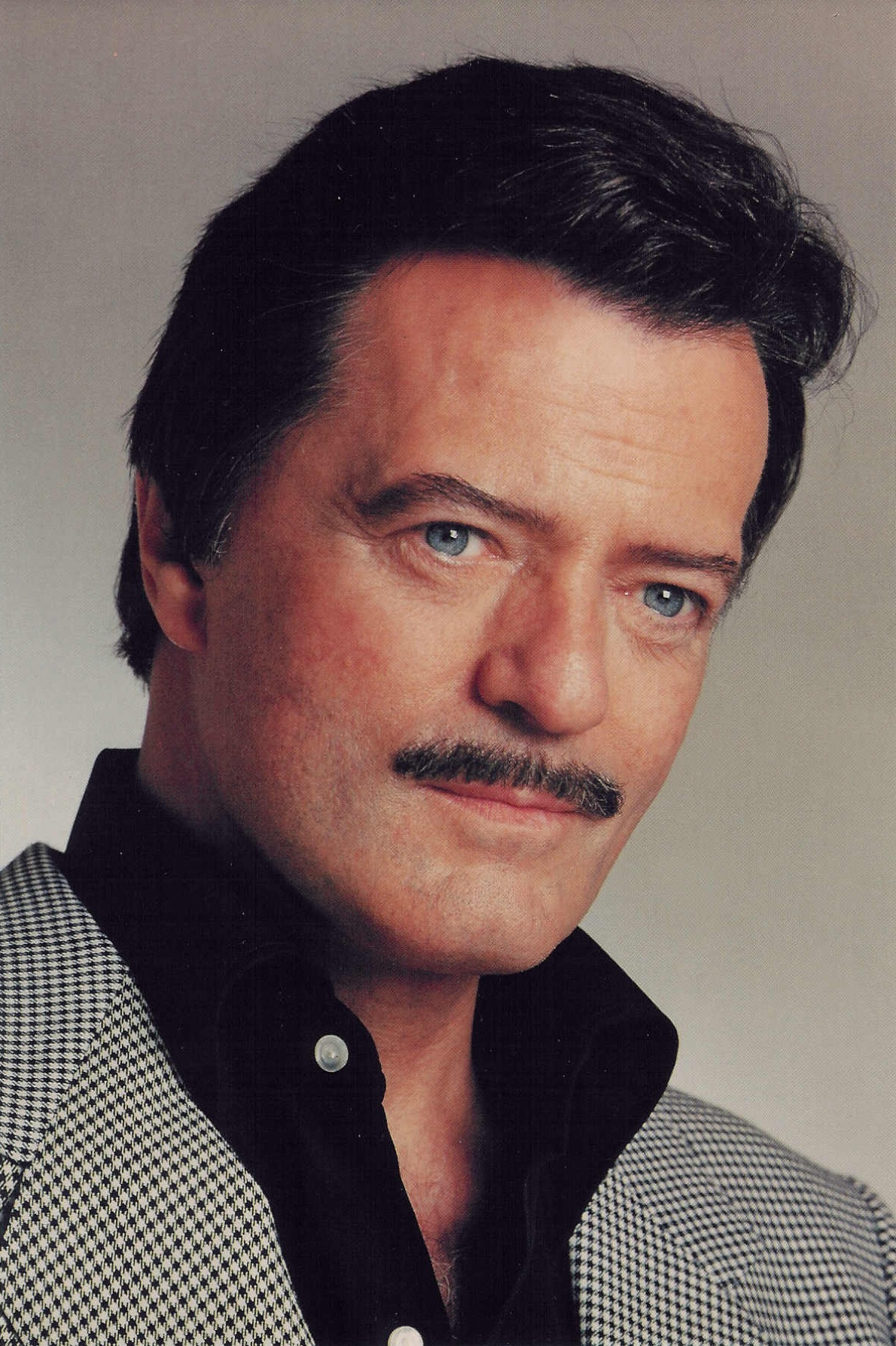
- Goulet in 1988
- Born: Robert Gerard Goulet; November 26, 1933; Lawrence, Massachusetts, U.S.
- Died: October 30, 2007 (aged 73); Los Angeles, California, U.S.
- Occupations: Singer; actor
- Years active: 1951–2007
- Spouses: Louise Longmore (m. 1956; div. 1963) Carol Lawrence (m. 1963; div. 1981) Vera Chochorovska Novak (m. 1982)
- Children: 3, including Nicolette
- Website: www.robertgoulet.com

Signature
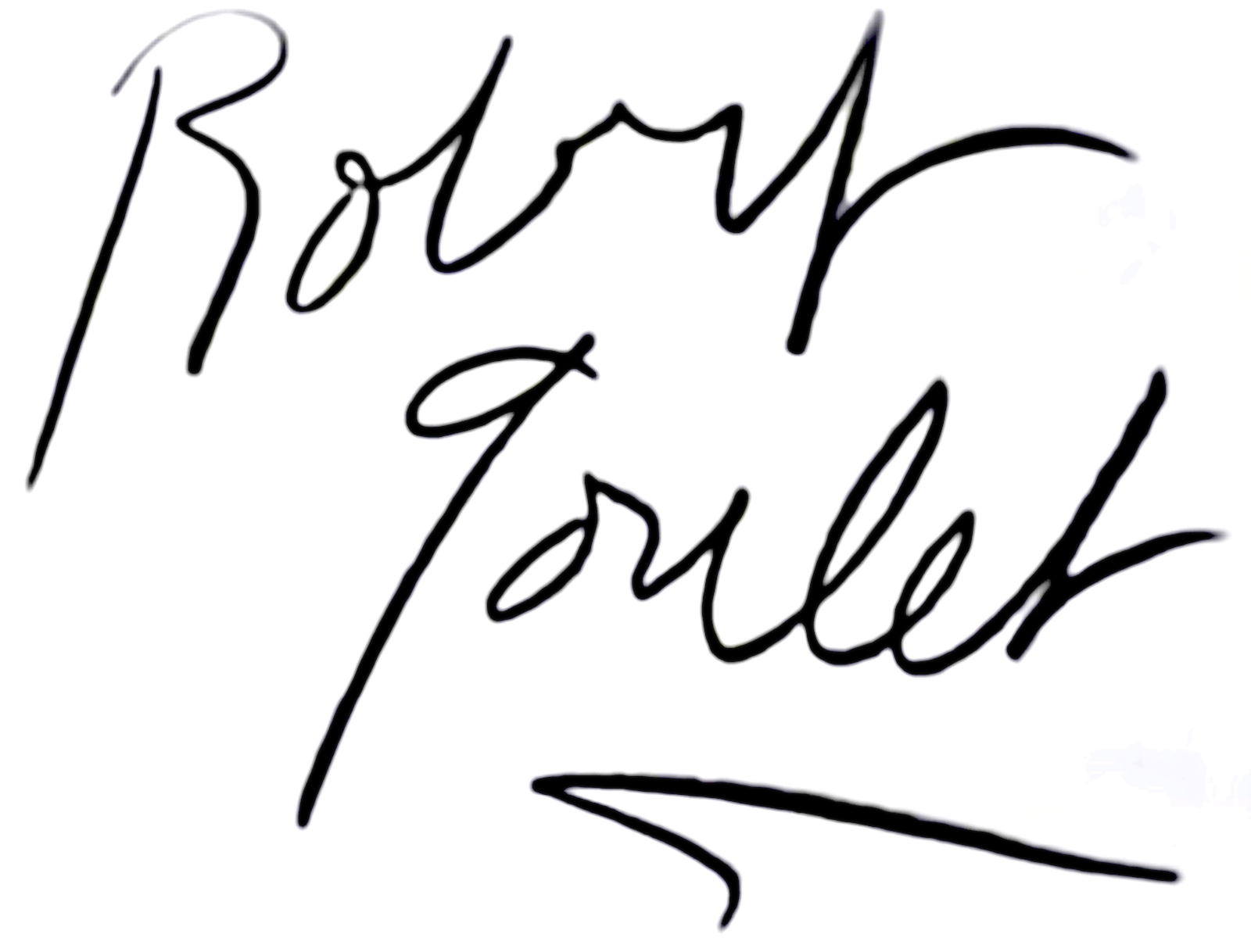

Robert Gerard Goulet (November 26, 1933 – October 30, 2007) was an American singer and actor.

Cast as Sir Lancelot and originating the role in the 1960 Broadway musical Camelot starring opposite established Broadway stars Richard Burton and Julie Andrews, he achieved instant recognition with his performance and interpretation of the song "If Ever I Would Leave You", which became his signature song. His debut in Camelot marked the beginning of a stage, screen, and recording career. A Tony Award and Grammy Award winner, his career spanned almost six decades.

Goulet starred in a 1966 television version of the musical Brigadoon, a production which won five primetime Emmy Awards. He gained recognition for his performance as Billy Bigelow in an abridged 1967 network television version of the musical Carousel.

In 1968, he won Broadway's Tony Award for Best Actor in a Musical for The Happy Time, a musical about a French-Canadian family set in Ottawa, in the role of photographer Jacques Bonnard, which gave Goulet the opportunity to display an authentic French-Canadian accent. He later returned to Broadway in 1993 as King Arthur in a revival of Camelot.

== Early life ==
Goulet was born and raised in Lawrence, Massachusetts, to French Canadian parents Jeanette (née Gauthier) and Joseph Goulet. After his father's death in 1947, the 13-year-old Goulet moved with his mother and sister Claire to Girouxville, Alberta, Canada, where his uncle and other relatives lived.

In 1949, the family moved to Edmonton, Alberta, to take advantage of the performance opportunities offered in the city. There, he attended the voice schools founded by Herbert G. Turner and Jean Létourneau, and later became a radio announcer for radio station CKUA. Goulet received a scholarship to the Royal Conservatory of Music in Toronto, where he studied voice with oratorio baritones George Lambert and Ernesto Vinci and with Mary Rezza. Goulet performed in opera productions with other Conservatory vocal students, including Jon Vickers and James Milligan.

In 1952, he moved to New York City in search of work as a singer, but finding none, returned to Toronto. There, he made the semifinals in CBC Television's Pick the Stars, leading to other network appearances on shows like Singing Stars of Tomorrow, Opportunity Knocks, Juliette, and the Canadian version of Howdy Doody in which he starred as Trapper Pierre opposite William Shatner. From 1957 to 1959, he co-hosted the CBC Television programme Showcase with Joyce Sullivan.

== Career ==
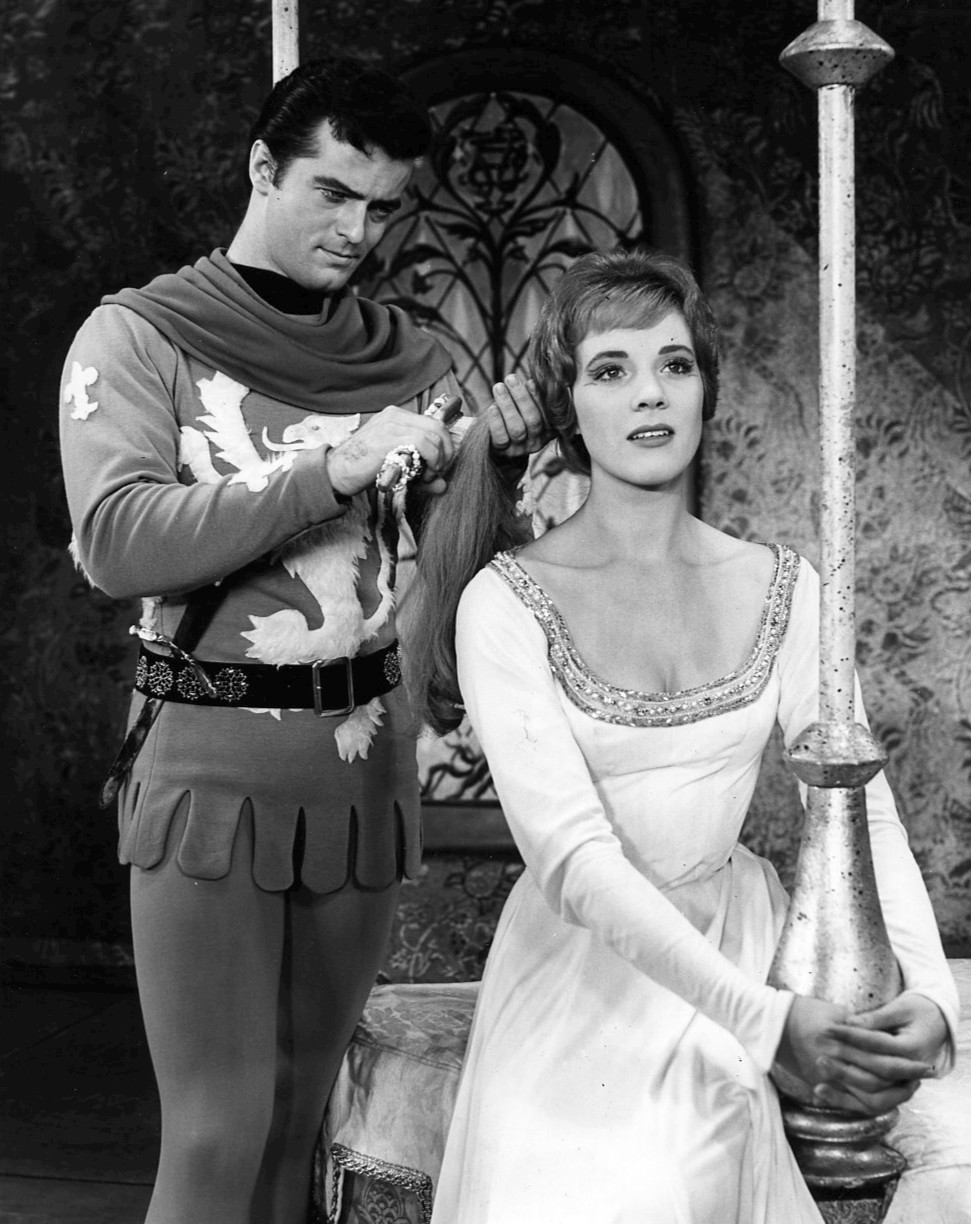
Robert Goulet and Julie Andrews in Camelot

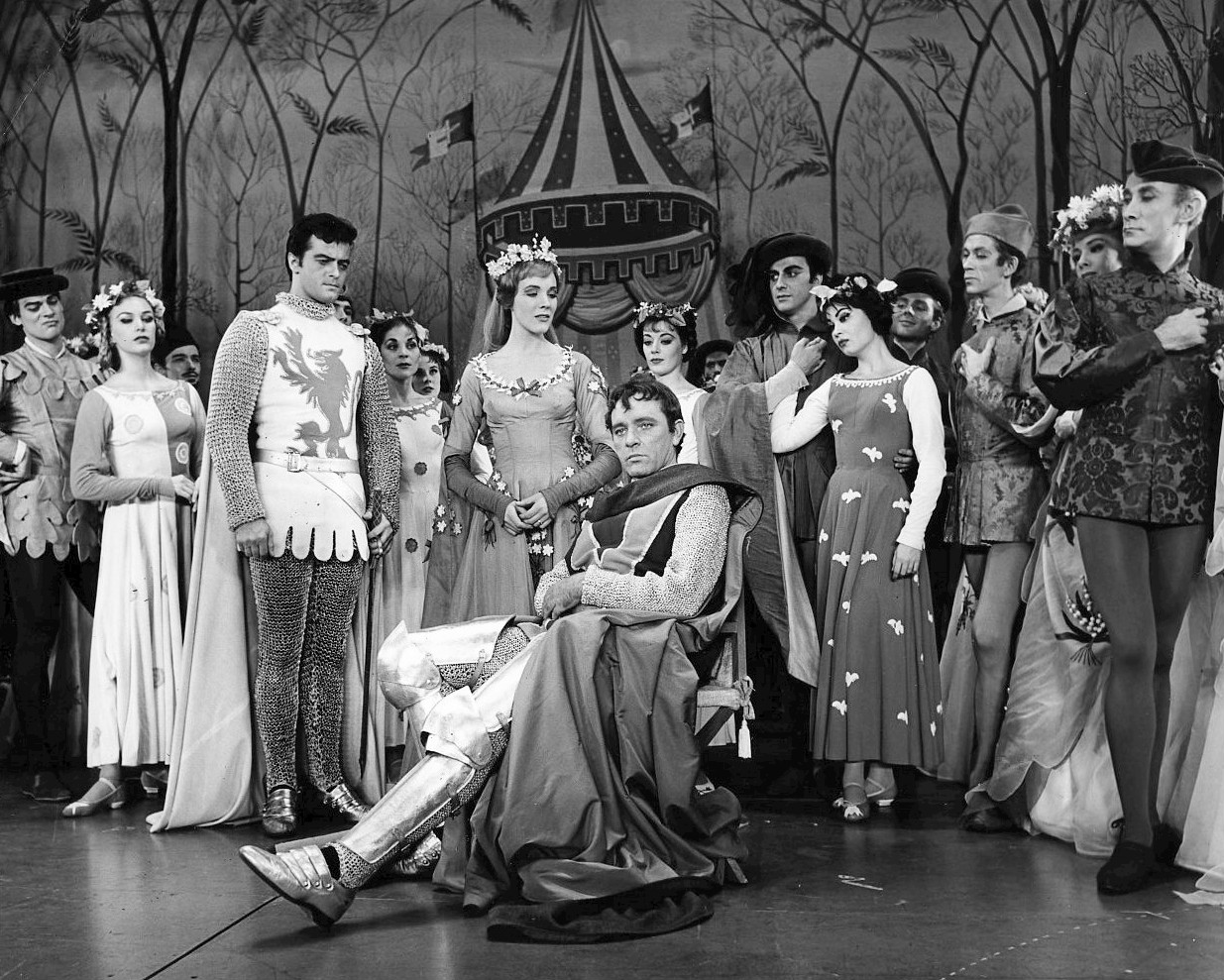
Scene from the musical Camelot

=== Musicals ===
Goulet's first serious musical stage work was in the 1958 Stratford Festival in Stratford, Ontario, Canada production of The Beggar's Opera by John Gay in a run of 12 performances, in which Goulet sang the lead role of Macheath.

Goulet's first U.S. bookings were in summer stock theatre with the Kenley Players, touring in Ohio and other Midwestern states. He appeared in eight productions, including Pajama Game (1959), Bells Are Ringing (1959), Dream Girl (1959), South Pacific (1960), Meet Me in St. Louis (1960) and Carousel (1960). John Kenley came to his dressing room after the opening of Pajama Game and gave him a raise, saying it was "because he knew he could never afford to again", Goulet said in 2006. "He was right." Goulet repeated his role in South Pacific for Kenley in a 1995 production.

In 1959, Goulet was introduced to librettist Alan Jay Lerner and composer Frederick Loewe, who were having difficulty casting the role of Lancelot in their new stage production destined for Broadway, the musical Camelot. Lerner and Loewe, impressed by Goulet's singing capabilities, signed the virtual newcomer to play the part, opposite Richard Burton (King Arthur) and Julie Andrews (Queen Guenevere). Camelot had its world premiere in Toronto in October 1960, although Goulet was at that time still under contract to host musical programs for CBC Television. Then a four-week engagement in Boston led to the show opening on Broadway two months later. It was necessary to remove much of the extended dialogue which had resulted in negative reviews, and early business in New York City was slow. According to Goulet, “Shortly after Camelot opened [on Broadway], Richard [Burton], Julie [Andrews] and I went on The Ed Sullivan Show, that’s what turned things around. We were given about 17 minutes, which was unheard of. The next day people were lined up around the block, and Camelot was a hit." Goulet received favorable reviews, for his introductory aria C'est Moi, and most notably for his show-stopping romantic ballad, If Ever I Would Leave You which would become his signature song. The music of the production was greatly appreciated by President Kennedy, who would play the cast recording at the White House before going to bed at night. The 1960 cast recording of Camelot was later inducted into the Grammy Hall of Fame.

Goulet starred in an award-winning two-hour 1966 television version of the Broadway musical Brigadoon, which had been the first notable success for librettist Alan Jay Lerner and composer Frederick Loewe. His co-star in the strong cast was Sally Ann Howes, who had achieved great acclaim in the female lead role in Brigadoon on Broadway in the 1963 revival of the musical, and also for a special performance at the White House for President Kennedy. Also in the cast were Peter Falk as the cynical traveling friend, famed ballet dancer Edward Vilella as the jilted courter, and Finlay Currie in his final performance as the minister. The production was highly praised and won five prime-time Emmy Awards.

Goulet also performed the lead roles in television productions of Carousel in 1967, and Kiss Me Kate in 1968, opposite his then-wife Carol Lawrence. The musicals were produced by Goulet's company Rogo Productions and aired on ABC, but none have been rebroadcast since the 1960s or released on video. All three were recorded on videotape rather than film.

In 1968, Goulet was back on Broadway in the Kander and Ebb musical The Happy Time, a story about a French-Canadian family in Ottawa. Goulet performed the role of photographer Jacques Bonnard, which had been taken in the 1952 non-musical film version by Louis Jourdan, and which gave Goulet the opportunity to display an authentic French-Canadian accent. The musical ran on Broadway from January 18 to September 28, 1968. Goulet won a Tony Award for Best Actor in a Musical for his role. Gower Champion also won two Tony awards for the musical, Best Choreography and Best Direction of a Musical. The musical co-starred David Wayne. John Serry Sr. collaborated as the orchestral accordionist.

Goulet, costumed as an RCMP officer or "Mountie", and Inga Swenson sang a medley of staged arias and duets from the 1924 Broadway musical Rose-Marie in the opening presentation at the 1982 Tony Awards ceremony, as well as two other Broadway songs from the 1981 season.

He starred as King Arthur in Camelot in a 1992 National Tour and returned to Broadway in 1993 with the same production.

Goulet played Don Quixote in the 1997–98 U.S. national tour of Man of La Mancha and recorded the theme song for the talk show Jimmy Kimmel Live! in 2003.

In 2005, he appeared on the Broadway stage for the last time as a mid-run replacement in La Cage aux Folles and found critical success once again. Clive Barnes of The New York Post wrote of his performance:

Goulet's still radiant grin is in better shape than his joints, giving his movements rather less grace than before. But when he sings, or even speaks, the years fall away. His gorgeous voice seems untouched by time, and his dapper presence fills the stage... With Robert Goulet's new, expansively embracing Georges, Beach seems revitalized, appearing to find a passion and pathos in the role previously eluding him.

=== Film, television, recordings ===
Goulet's first film performance was the animated musical feature Gay Purr-ee (1962), in which he provided the voice of the male lead character, 'Jaune Tom', opposite the female lead character, 'Mewsette', voiced by Judy Garland. His first non-singing film role was in Honeymoon Hotel (1964), co-starring Jill St. John.

Goulet frequently appeared on U.S. network television programs singing with Judy Garland and Julie Andrews.

On May 25, 1965, Goulet mangled the lyrics to the U.S. national anthem at the opening of the second Muhammad Ali–Sonny Liston heavyweight championship fight in Lewiston, Maine in front of the smallest crowd in a heavyweight championship. It was actually the last fight for Cassius Clay before he chose the name Muhammad Ali. It was supposed to have been held in Boston but there was a mix-up and Lewiston was a last minute site replacement. Goulet had never sung the U.S. anthem in public before; the only anthem that he had ever performed publicly was "O Canada". Goulet replaced the lyric "dawn's early light" with "dawn's early night" and also fervently intoned "gave proof through the fight." The fans booed while Howard Cosell chortled thinking it good fun and all part of the spectacle. Now there was something to talk about besides the strange fight that ended in the first round with what has become known in the history books as the "phantom punch". The gaffes were reported in newspapers nationwide the next morning, and Goulet was criticized in opinion columns for a lack of knowledge of the lyrics. As Dorothy Kilgallen had predicted on Goulet's appearance on What's My Line? a few days before, the anthem lasted longer than the fight, which was over early in the first round.

Goulet began a recording career with Columbia Records in 1962, which resulted in more than 60 best selling albums. Goulet had his biggest pop hit in 1965, when his single "My Love, Forgive Me" reached No. 16 on the Billboard Hot 100 and No. 22 in Canada. Goulet won the Grammy Award for Best New Artist in 1962.

In 1966, Goulet starred in the television series Blue Light in which he played a journalist working undercover in Nazi Germany as a spy on behalf of the Allies. The series ran for 17 episodes between January 12, 1966, and May 18, 1966. In December, a theatrical film starring Goulet, I Deal in Danger, was released, made up of the first four episodes of Blue Light edited together.

Goulet guest starred on The Lucy Show in 1967 as himself and two additional characters who entered a Robert Goulet look-alike contest.

In 1972, he played a lead villain in the season finale of television original Mission: Impossible. In 1978, he sang "You Light Up My Life" at the Miss Universe Pageant to the five finalists. Goulet was featured in a two-part episode of the sitcom Alice during the 1981 season, again playing himself. The plot involves Mel (Vic Tayback) and the girls winning a free trip to Las Vegas, and while there, losing his diner in a gambling spree. Alice (Linda Lavin) plans to impersonate Goulet in an effort to persuade the casino owner to return the diner to Mel. The real Goulet appears and sings a duet with the (much shorter) fake Robert Goulet portrayed by Alice.

Goulet made a cameo appearance as himself in Louis Malle's Atlantic City (1980). The movie was nominated for five Academy Awards, including Best Picture. He recorded the song "Atlantic City (My Old Friend)" for Applause Records in 1981.

Goulet's career strongly oriented in Las Vegas, and he was named Las Vegas Entertainer of the Year in 1982.

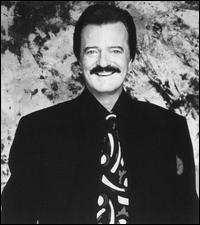
Goulet in 1988

In 1988, Tim Burton cast him as a houseguest blown through the roof by Beetlejuice, and Goulet also played himself in Bill Murray's Scrooged (both 1988). He performed the Canadian national anthem to open WrestleMania VI at SkyDome in Toronto in 1990. Goulet also made several appearances on the ABC sitcom Mr. Belvedere during its five-year run.

In 1991, Goulet starred, with John Putch and Hillary Bailey Smith, in the unsold television series pilot Acting Sheriff. That same year, he appeared as Quentin Hapsburg, opposite Priscilla Presley and Leslie Nielsen, in the comedy film The Naked Gun 2½: The Smell of Fear. This followed a cameo as a "Special Guest Star" in the episode "The Butler Did It (A Bird in the Hand)" of the 1982 TV series Police Squad! in which he died by firing squad during the opening credits. The television series spawned The Naked Gun film series.

In 1992, Goulet made an uncredited appearance as the piano player who suffers agonizing injuries in the "Weird Al" Yankovic video for "You Don't Love Me Anymore". That same year, Goulet guest-starred as country music singer Eddie Larren in an episode of the TV series In the Heat of the Night, "When the Music Stopped".

In 1993, he played himself in The Simpsons episode "$pringfield". In that episode, Bart Simpson booked him into his own casino (actually Bart's treehouse), where he sang "Jingle Bells (Batman Smells)".

In 1995 he appeared fronting a big band in a small sports themed nightclub for a series of humorous 30-second ESPN ads revolving around NCAA basketball. NCAA head coaches appeared in the audience as Goulet happily, not to mention strongly and authoritatively, sang variations on popular songs, with lyrics changed to include college basketball references. He appeared in the commercials for two seasons before ending the run in 1996.

In 1996, Goulet appeared in Ellen DeGeneres' first starring movie, Mr. Wrong, as an insecure TV host; and he returned to Broadway in Moon Over Buffalo, co-starring Lynn Redgrave. He provided the singing voice of Wheezy the penguin in the big band-style finale of the 1999 Pixar film Toy Story 2, singing a new version of "You've Got a Friend in Me". In 2000, he played himself on two episodes of the Robert Smigel series TV Funhouse; as a sort-of mentor to the show's animal puppet troupe, he was the only character who had the respect of Triumph the Insult Comic Dog. Goulet also appeared in the Disney animated series Recess, as the singing voice for Mikey Blumberg, and in the film Recess: School's Out.

Goulet's commercial work included a 30-second spot for the 1998 Mercedes-Benz C-Class, showing him in different costumes (toll collector, construction worker, meter maid, etc.), all while singing "It's Impossible"; and an Emerald Nuts television advertising campaign in 2006, which debuted during Super Bowl XL and continued until his death.

In 2006, Goulet appeared in an episode ("Sold'y Locks") of The King of Queens as himself. In 2007, Goulet received the Voice Education Research Awareness (VERA) Award from The Voice Foundation.

Goulet's last public performance was on the PBS televised special, My Music: 50's Pop Parade, broadcast on August 1, 2007, in which he sang "Sunrise, Sunset" and "If Ever I Would Leave You".

== Personal life ==
Goulet, a Canadian American who had spent time living and working in Canada, applied for Canadian citizenship in 2006, but died the following year while his application was still pending.

Goulet and his first wife Louise Longmore had one daughter, Nicolette. He also had two sons with his second wife, actress and singer Carol Lawrence.

In 1982, Goulet married Yugoslavian-born artist and writer Vera Novak, who was also his business partner and manager. He sang "God Bless America" on Friday, August 8, 2003, when she was sworn in as a citizen of the United States in Las Vegas. They resided in Las Vegas and Los Angeles.

== Honors ==
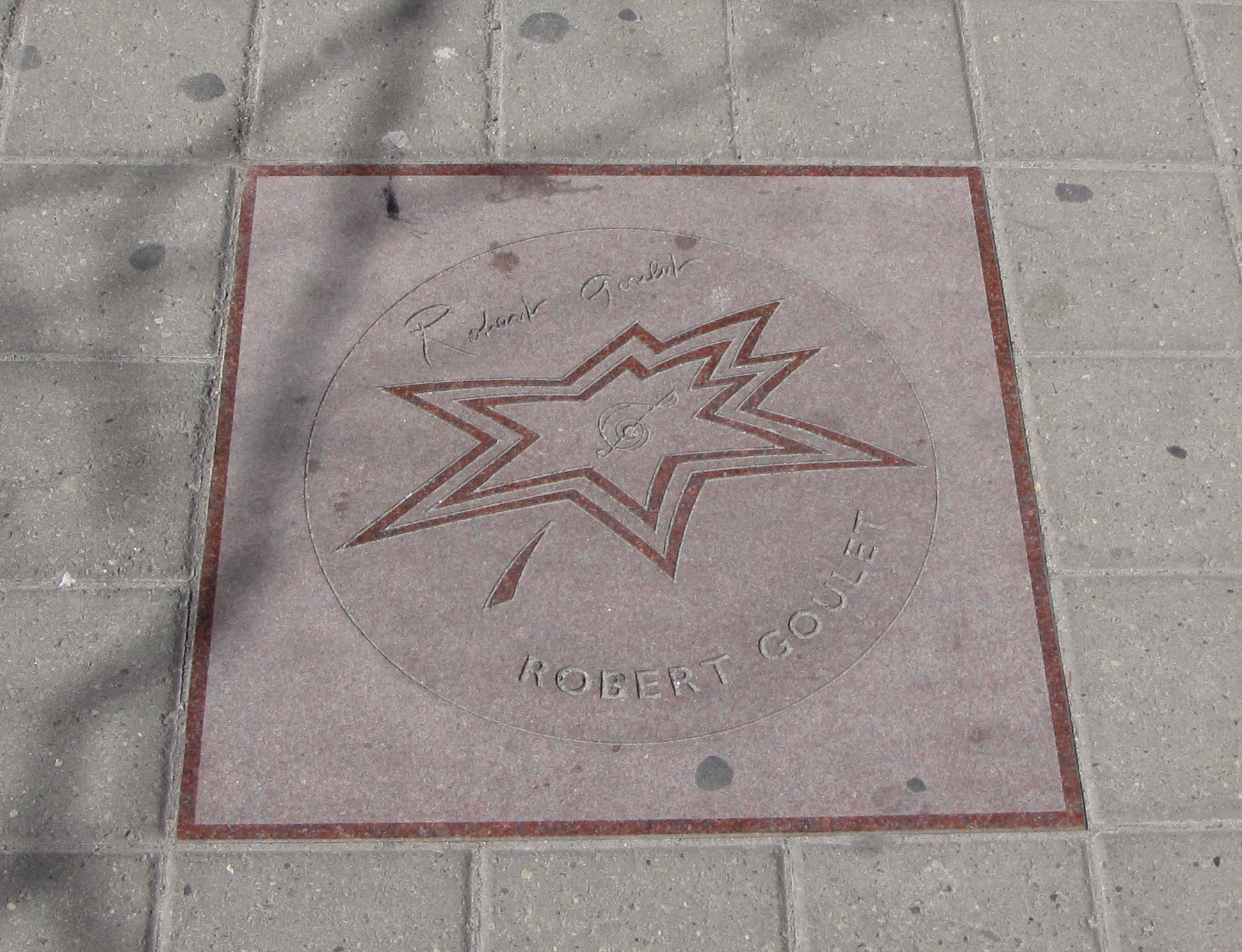
Robert Goulet's star on Canada's Walk of Fame

In 1975, Goulet received a star on the Hollywood Walk of Fame. In 1993, he was named an Honorary Fellow of the Royal Conservatory of Toronto. In 2000, he was awarded the Distinguished Lifetime Service Award for Touring Broadway by the League of American Theatres and Producers. In 2006, he received a star on Canada's Walk of Fame.

== Death ==
On September 30, 2007, Goulet was hospitalized in Las Vegas, where he was diagnosed with idiopathic pulmonary fibrosis, a rare but rapidly progressive condition with extremely poor long-term survival rates. On October 13 he was transferred to Cedars-Sinai Medical Center in Los Angeles after it was determined he would not survive without an emergency lung transplant. While awaiting a lung transplant, Goulet died from pulmonary fibrosis on the morning of October 30 at Cedars-Sinai Medical Center at the age of 73. Theater marquees in New York and in cities across North America were dimmed in his memory the following day. On November 9, the day of his funeral at the Shrine of the Most Holy Redeemer, Las Vegas honored Goulet by closing the Las Vegas Strip for his funeral procession. Several venues also posted his name on their marquees as a final tribute.

== Legacy ==
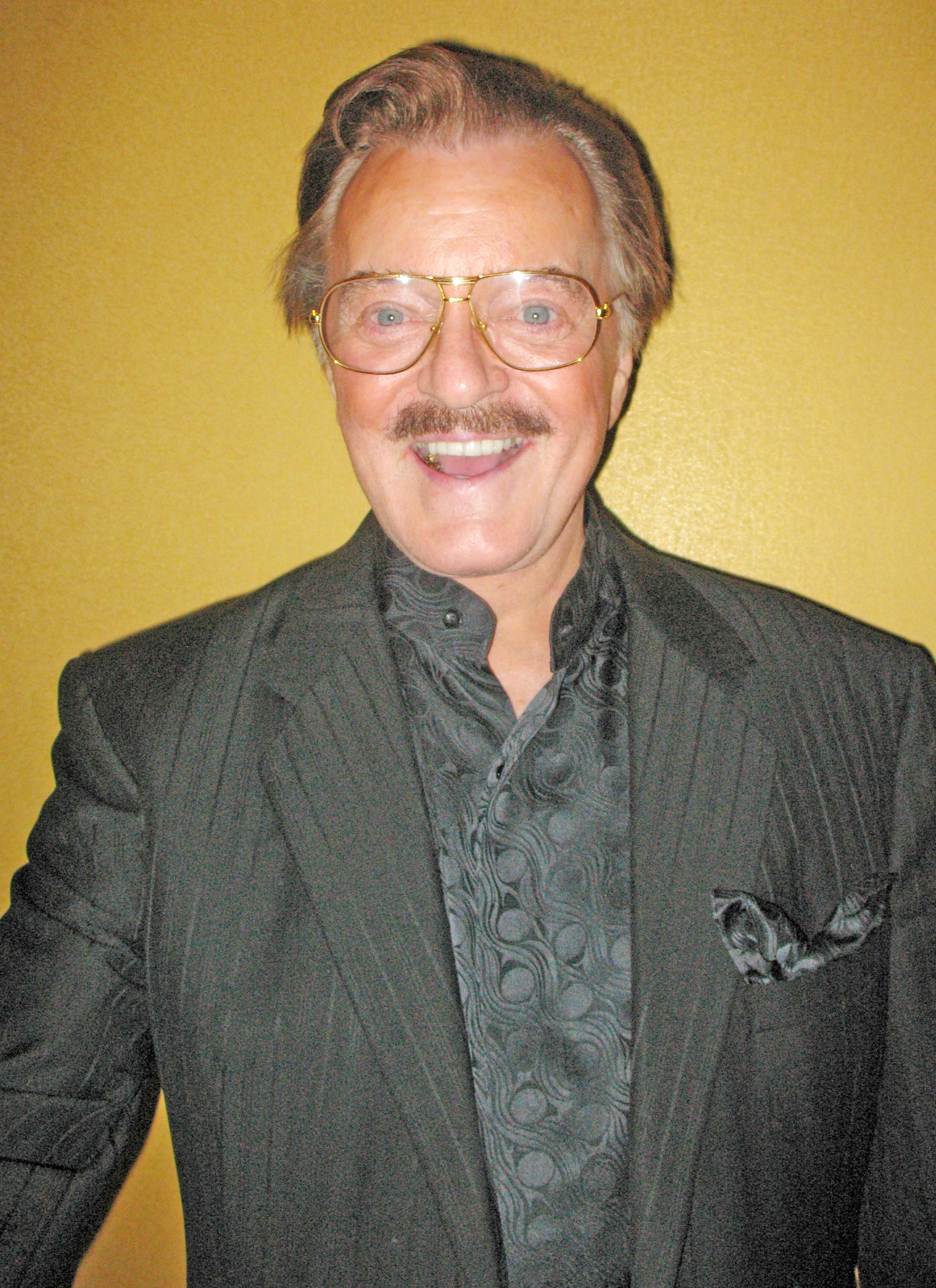
Goulet in May 2007

In the early 2000s, Goulet was often subject to parody in Saturday Night Live skits in which he was portrayed by comedian Will Ferrell. In one segment Will Ferrell, portraying Goulet, performed several songs from a farce compilation album titled Coconut Bangers Ball: It's a Rap! Ferrell performed "Big Poppa" by The Notorious B.I.G., as well as the "Thong Song" by Sisqo, in a mock crooning style similar to that of Goulet.

Ferrell portrayed Goulet on the April 7, 2001, episode of SNL in a lengthy sketch opposite fellow cast member Chris Parnell and host Alec Baldwin. A cult favorite, the sketch is ostensibly a commercial for a stage production of a new musical titled "Red Ships of Spain" in which Robert Goulet (Ferrell) is appearing in the leading role of Captain Ferdinand Poncho. Parnell and Baldwin portray Goulet's (fictitious) brothers Wes and Ken Goulet, respectively, who have supporting roles in the production. Ana Gasteyer also appears as Robert's (fictitious) daughter Sheila Goulet, who is oddly cast as her father's character's love interest.

He is also known for singing the theme song for the talk show Jimmy Kimmel Live!, which he recorded in 2003.

The musical A Chorus Line included a reference to him in "Hello Twelve, Hello Thirteen, Hello Love".

The American Mustache Institute presents The Robert Goulet Memorial Mustached American of the Year Award to the person who best represents or contributes to the Mustached American community during that year.

Journalist Scott Simon, host of Weekend Edition Saturday on NPR, said in 2007:

A professional entertainer doesn't give any less of himself just because the audience gets a little smaller. What Robert Goulet taught us ... is that people who've been up and down are more interesting than people who are on their way up and think that's the only direction life has. ... He worked hard; he made people happy.

In 2016, Goulet was portrayed by Broadway star Matt Bogart in episode 4 of HBO's Vinyl as an act for American Century.

== Singles ==
Year	Single	Chart positions		Album
Year	Single	US	US AC	Album
1961	"I'm Just Taking My Time" b/w "One Life"	–	–	Non-album tracks
1962	"Too Soon" b/w "Two Different Worlds" (from My Love Forgive Me)	–	–	Non-album tracks
1962	"What Kind of Fool Am I?" b/w "Where Do I Go from Here" (from Two of Us)	89	–	My Love Forgive Me
1962	"Don't Be Afraid of Romance" b/w "Young at Love"	–	–	Non-album tracks
1963	"Two of Us" b/w "(These Are) The Closing Credits" (Non-album track)	132	–	Two Of Us
1963	"Believe in Me" b/w "How Very Special You Are"	–	–	Non-album tracks
1963	"Under the Yum Yum Tree" b/w "If You Go"	–	–	Non-album tracks
1964	"The Name of the Game" b/w "Choose"	–	–	Non-album tracks
1964	"Too Good" b/w "Seventh Dawn" (Non-album track)	–	–	My Love Forgive Me
1964	"My Love, Forgive Me (Amore, scusami)" /	16	2	My Love Forgive Me
1964	"I'd Rather Be Rich"	131	–	Non-album track
1965	"Begin to Love" b/w "I Never Got to Paris"	110	–	Begin to Love
1965	"Summer Sounds" b/w "The More I See of Mimi" (from Begin to Love)	58	14	Summer Sounds
1965	"Come Back to Me, My Love" /	118	5	On Broadway
1965	"On a Clear Day You Can See Forever"	119	13	On Broadway
1965	"Everlasting" b/w "Crazy Heart of Mine"	–	–	Non-album tracks
1966	"Why Be Ashamed" /	–	28	Non-album tracks
1966	"Young Only Yesterday"	–	37	I Remember You
1966	"Daydreamer" (from The Daydreamer (soundtrack)) b/w "My Best Girl"	–	22	Non-album tracks
1966	"Once I Had a Heart" b/w "I Hear a Different Drummer"	–	15	Non-album tracks
1966	"There But for You Go I" b/w "Fortissimo" (from Robert Goulet's Greatest Hits)	–	–	On Broadway, Volume 2
1967	"World of Clowns" b/w "Ciao Compare" (from On Broadway, Volume 2)	–	20	Non-album tracks
1967	"One Life, One Dream" b/w "There's a Way"	–	33	Non-album tracks
1967	"The Sinner" b/w "How Can I Leave You"	–	29	Non-album tracks
1967	"Mon Amour, Mon Amour" b/w "This Year"	–	–	Non-album tracks
1967	"If Ever I Would Leave You" b/w "Follow Me"	–	–	Non-album tracks
1968	"The Happy Time" b/w "I Don't Remember You"	–	33	The Happy Time (Soundtrack)
1968	"What a Wonderful World" b/w "I Don't Want to Hurt You Anymore" (Non-album track)	–	26	Woman, Woman
1968	"Thirty Days Hath September" b/w "A Chance to Live in Camelot" (Non-album track)	–	17	Both Sides Now
1968	"Hurry Home for Christmas" b/w "A Wonderful World of Christmas"	–	–	Robert Goulet's Wonderful World of Christmas
1969	"Wait for Me" b/w "I'll Catch the Sun"	–	–	Non-album tracks
1969	"Didn't We" b/w "Bon Soir Dame" (from Both Sides Now)	–	33	I Wish You Love
1969	"Only Yesterday" b/w "One Life to Live"	–	–	Non-album tracks
1969	"One Night" b/w "I Can't Live Without You"	–	–	Non-album tracks
1970	"My Woman, My Woman, My Wife" b/w "Come Saturday"	–	–	Robert Goulet Sings Today's Greatest Hits
1970	"Healing River" b/w "One at a Time"	–	–	Non-album tracks
1973	"God Is at Work Within You" b/w "One Solitary Life"	–	–	Non-album tracks
1974	"Pages of Life" b/w "Summer Green, Autumn Gold"	–	–	Non-album tracks
1974	"The Little Prince" b/w "I Won't Send Roses"	–	–	After All Is Said and Done
1975	"Someone to Give My Love To" b/w "Something to Believe In"	–	–	After All Is Said and Done
1976	"After All Is Said and Done" b/w "The Little Prince"	–	–	After All Is Said and Done
1999	"You've Got a Friend in Me"	-	-	Toy Story 2: An Original Walt Disney Records Soundtrack
2001	"Green Tambourine"	-	-	Recess: School's Out (Original Movie Soundtrack)

== Discography ==
Columbia Records (except as noted):

- Camelot, 1960 (original Broadway cast) #1 US, Grammy Hall of Fame
- Always You, 1962 #43 US
- Two of Us, 1962 #20 US
- Sincerely Yours, 1962 #9 US
- The Wonderful World of Love, 1963 #11 US
- Annie Get Your Gun, studio cast, with Doris Day, 1963
- Robert Goulet in Person: Recorded Live in Concert, 1963 #16 US
- This Christmas I Spend with You, 1963
- Manhattan Tower / The Man Who Loves Manhattan, 1964 #31 US
- Without You, 1964 #72 US
- My Love, Forgive Me, 1964 #5 US (#22 Canada)
- Summer Sounds, 1965 #31 US
- Begin to Love, 1965 #69 US
- On Broadway, 1965 #33 US
- I Remember You, 1966 #73 US
- Travelin' On Tour, 1966
- On Broadway, Volume 2, 1967
- Hollywood Mon Amour – Great Love Songs from the Movies. 1967
- The Happy Time, 1968 (original broadway cast)
- Woman, Woman, 1968
- Both Sides Now 1968
- Robert Goulet's Wonderful World of Christmas, 1968
- Souvenir D'Italie 1969
- Come Back to Sorrento 1969
- Robert Goulet's Greatest Hits 1969 1990
- Today's Greatest Hits, 1970
- I Wish You Love, 1970
- I Never Did as I Was Told, MGM Records, 1971
- Bridge Over Troubled Water, Harmony Label Columbia, 1971
- After All Is Said and Done, Artists of America, 1976
- Close to You, Applause Records, 1982
- 16 Most Requested Songs, Columbia, 1989
- Best of Robert Goulet, Curb Records, 1990
- In Love, Sony Music Distribution, 1995
- A Personal Christmas Collection, Columbia/Legacy, 1997
- My Love Forgive me/Sincerely Yours, Collectables, 1997
- On Broadway/On Broadway 2, 2000
- Love Songs, Sony Music Special Products, 2001
- 36 All-Time Favorites, GSC/Sony Special Products, 2001
- Always you/In Person, Collectables, 2002
- Two of Us/Begin to Love, 2003
- Robert Goulet Collection, 2004
- In a Mellow Mood, United Audio Entertainment, 2005
- Won't You Dance with This Man, Rove, 2012
- Kiss Me, Kate/Brigadoon (Original Television Cast Recording) Masterworks Broadway 2014
- The Complete Columbia Christmas Recordings, Real Gone Music, 2014
- Definitive Collection , Real Gone Music, 2016
- Wonderful World of Robert Goulet, Jasmine Records, 2017

== Filmography ==
=== Film ===
Year	Title	Role	Notes
1962	Gay Purr-ee	Jaune-Tom	Voice
1964	Honeymoon Hotel	Ross Kingsley	
1964	I'd Rather Be Rich	Paul Benton	
1966	The Daydreamer	The Singer	Voice
1966	I Deal in Danger	David March	
1970	Underground	Dawson	
1980	Atlantic City	Singer	
1988	Beetlejuice	Maxie Dean	
1988	Scrooged	Himself	He portrays himself in a commercial for "Robert Goulet's Cajun Christmas" on the fictional IBC television network.
1991	The Naked Gun 2½: The Smell of Fear	Quentin Hapsburg	
1996	Mr. Wrong	Dick Braxton	
1999	Toy Story 2	Wheezy the Penguin	Singing Voice, Uncredited
2000	The Last Producer	Henry Moore	
2000	G-Men from Hell	The Devil	
2001	Recess: School's Out	Mikey Blumberg	Singing voice

=== Television ===
Year	Title	Role	Notes
1954	Howdy Doody	Trapper Pierre	
1954–1955	Scope	Mal Tompkins	2 episodes
1955–1958	Folio	Jeff	4 episodes
1955–1960	Encounter	Jim Mercer / Laz / Frank Taylor	5 episodes
1957	On Camera	Michael	Episode: "Innocent Deception"
1959	The Unforeseen		Episode: "Heaven Can Wait"
1959–1960	Wayne and Shuster		4 episodes
1960	Startime	The Traveller / Prince Zorn	2 episodes
1960	First Person		Episode: "At the Railing"
1961	The Enchanted Nutcracker	Johnny	TV movie
1962	The Garry Moore Show with Barbra Streisand	Himself	
1963	The Jack Benny Program	Himself	Episode: "The Robert Goulet Show"
1964	Kraft Suspense Theatre	Private LeRoy Brubaker / James O. Vitelli	Episode: "Operation Greif"
1965	The Patty Duke Show	Gregory Noble	Episode: "Don't Monkey with Mendel"
1965–1966	The Red Skelton Show	Nathan Nothing / Harry Handout	2 episodes
1966	Blue Light	David March	17 episodes
1966	Brigadoon	Tommy Albright	TV movie
1967	The Jackie Gleason Show	Ace Fargo	Episode: "The Honeymooners: Life Upon the Wicked Stage"
1967	The Big Valley	Brother Love	Episode: "Brother Love"
1967	Carousel	Billy Bigelow	TV movie
1967	The Lucy Show	Chuck Willis	Episode: "Lucy and Robert Goulet"
1968	Kiss Me Kate	Fred Graham / 'Petruchio'	TV movie
1968	The Carol Burnett Show		Season 2 Episode 25
1968	That's Life		Episode: "The Honeymoon"
1968	The Pepsodent Show	Pilot	Episode dated December 19, 1968
1969	The Name of the Game	Dr. Claude Evenhauer	Episode: "Keep the Doctor Away"
1969	Muhammad Ali, The Greatest		Documentary
1972	Mission: Impossible	Joe Epic	Episode: "Leona"
1972	The Couple Takes a Wife	Randy Perkins	TV movie
1973	Cannon	Capt. Mel Danvers	Episode: "A Well Remembered Terror"
1975	Police Woman	Eddie Diamond	Episode: "Pawns of Power"
1977	Police Story	Glenn Talbot	Episode: "Prime Rib"
1978	The Love Boat	Charlie Godwin	Episode: "A Time for Everything/The Song Is Ended/Accidental Cruise/Anoushka"
1978	Flying High	Reggie	Episode: "Brides and Grooms"
1980	The Dream Merchants	Craig Warren	2 episodes
1980	Alice	Himself	Episode: "Too Many Robert Goulets"
1980–1983	Fantasy Island	Eugène Henri Paul Gauguin; Frank Miller / Avery Williams	4 episodes
1982	Police Squad!	Executed Man	Episode: "The Butler Did It (A Bird in the Hand)"
1983	Matt Houston	Johnny Foster	Episode: "The Showgirl Murders"
1984	Glitter		Episode: "Illusions"
1985	Murder, She Wrote	Willard Kaufmann	Episode: "Paint Me a Murder"
1985	Finder of Lost Loves	Gabe McGuire	Episode: "Haunted Memories"
1986–1990	Mr. Belvedere	Himself	4 episodes
1991	Acting Sheriff	Sheriff Brent McCord	TV movie
1992	The New WKRP in Cincinnati	Prince Reynaldo	Episode: "Jennifer and the Prince"
1992	In the Heat of the Night	Eddy Larren	Episode: "When the Music Stopped"
1993	The Simpsons	Himself	Voice; Episode: "$pringfield (or, How I Learned to Stop Worrying and Love Legalized Gambling)"
1993	Based on an Untrue Story	Remo	TV movie
1995	Boy Meets World	Himself	Episode: "The Thrilla in Phila"
1995	Get Smart	Agent 0 / Himself	Episode: "Casino Evil"
1995	Burke's Law	Earl Rankin	Episode: "Who Killed the Centerfold?"
1996	The Line King: The Al Hirschfeld Story		Documentary
1998–2000	Recess	Mikey Blumberg's singing voice	4 episodes
1999	Just Shoot Me!	Himself	Episode: "Toy Story"
1999	Two Guys and a Girl	Himself	Episode: "Out with the Old" Episode: "El matrimonio Loco"
2000	TV Funhouse	Himself	
2001	Recess Christmas: Miracle on Third Street	Mikey Blumberg	Direct-to-Video; Singing voice
2003	Broadway: The Golden Age	Himself	Documentary
2003	Gary the Rat	Himself	Voice, Episode: "Manratten"
2006	The King of Queens	Himself / Performer	Episode: "Sold-Y Locks"
2008	My Gym Partner's a Monkey	Asst. Coach Ferret	Voice, Episode: "Animal School Musical", Posthumous release, (final appearance)

== Stage appearances ==
- Visit to a Small Planet (1951)
- Thunder Rock (1951)
- Sunshine Town (1954)
- Spring Thaw (1955–1957)
- Carousel as Billy Bigelow (1956)
- The Pajama Game (1956)
- Gentlemen Prefer Blondes (1956)
- Finian's Rainbow (1956)
- South Pacific (1956)
- The Pajama Game (1957–1958)
- The Optimist (1957)
- The Beggar's Opera (1958)
- Bells Are Ringing (1959)
- Dream Girl (1959)
- Meet Me in St. Louis (1960)
- Carousel as Billy Bigelow (1960)
- Camelot as Lancelot du Lac (cast member from December 3, 1960 – October 8, 1962) (replaced by Robert Peterson)
- The Happy Time as Jacques Bonnard (January 18 – September 28, 1968)
- I Do! I Do! (1970–1971)
- Camelot as King Arthur (1975)
- Carousel as Billy Bigelow (1979)
- On a Clear Day You Can See Forever as Dr. Conrad Fuller (1980–1981)
- Kiss Me, Kate as Fred Graham / Petruchio (1981)
- South Pacific as Emile de Becque (1986–1989)
- Camelot as King Arthur (1990)
- The Fantasticks as El Gallo (1990)
- Camelot as King Arthur (1992–1994)
- Man of La Mancha as Don Quixote / Miguel de Cervantes (1996–1997)
- Moon Over Buffalo (1996) (replacement for Philip Bosco)
- Sweet Charity as Vittorio Vidal (1998)
- Camelot as King Arthur (1998)
- South Pacific as Emile de Becque (2002)
- Camelot as King Arthur (2004)
- La Cage aux Folles as Georges (2005) (replacement for Daniel Davis)

Awards and achievements
Preceded by Peter Nero	Grammy Award for Best New Artist; 1962	Succeeded by The Swingle Singers
Preceded by Nancy Dussault for Do Re Mi	Theatre World Award; 1961 for Camelot	Succeeded by Joan Hackett for Call Me By My Rightful Name
