= Il cantante mascherato =

Italian reality singing competition television series

- Genre: Reality competition; Panel show
- Based on: The Masked Singer by Fox; King of Mask Singer by Munhwa Broadcasting Corporation
- Directed by: Luca Alcini
- Presented by: Milly Carlucci
- Judges: Francesco Facchinetti; Flavio Insinna; Patty Pravo; Guillermo Mariotto; Ilenia Pastorelli; Costantino della Gherardesca; Caterina Balivo; Arisa; Iva Zanicchi; Serena Bortone; Christian De Sica
- Opening theme: Who Are You by The Who
- Country of origin: Italy
- Original language: Italian
- No. of seasons: 4
- No. of episodes: 22

Production
- Producer: Endemol Shine Italy

Original release
- Network: Rai 1
- Release: 10 January – 22 April 2020

Related
- Masked Singer franchise

Il cantante mascherato is an Italian reality singing competition television series part of the Masked Singer franchise. It premiered on Rai 1 on 10 January 2020.

== Production ==
On 9 July 2019, it was announced that Rai 1 and Endemol Shine Italy were producing a local version of the Fox reality singing competition, The Masked Singer, which itself is based on the Munhwa Broadcasting Corporation singing competition, King of Mask Singer.

=== Panelists and host ===
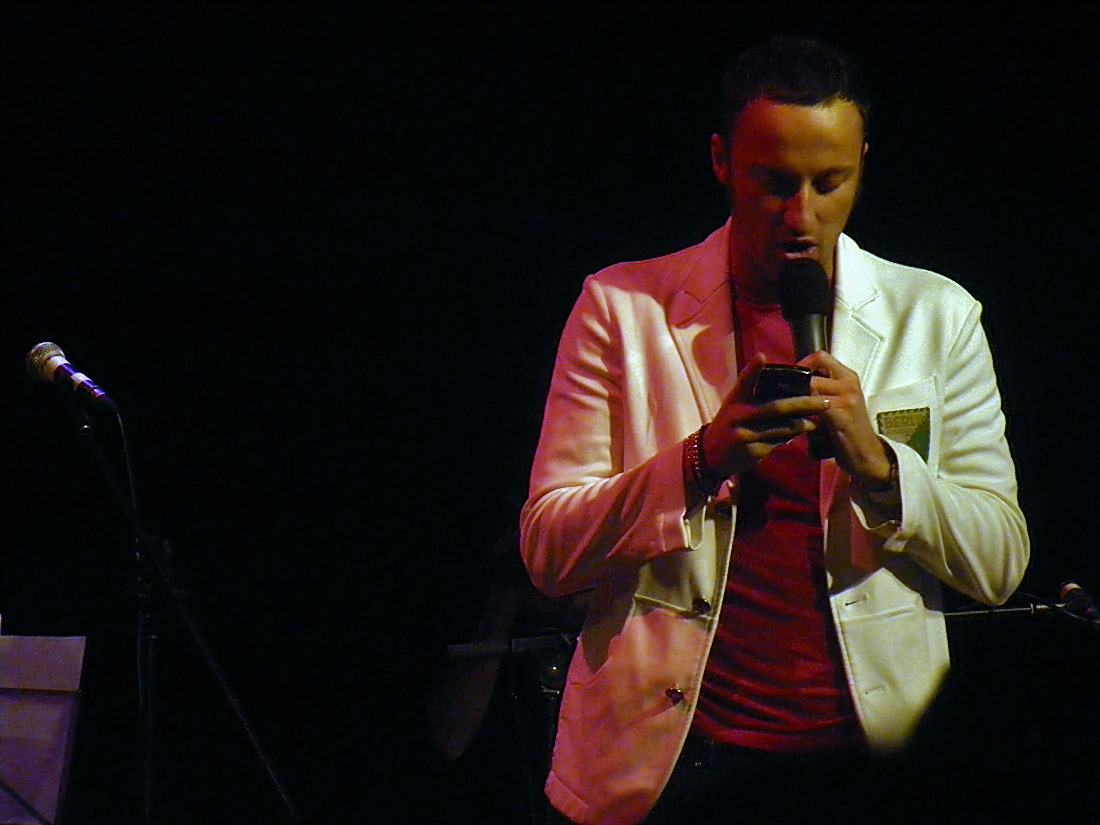
Francesco Facchinetti

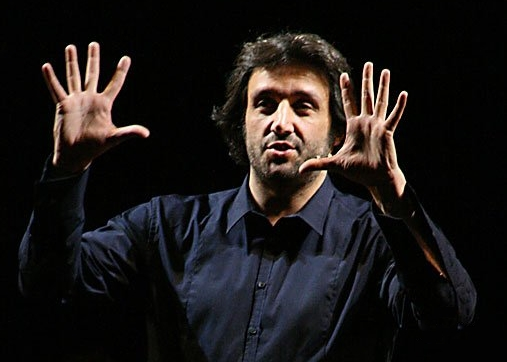
Flavio Insinna

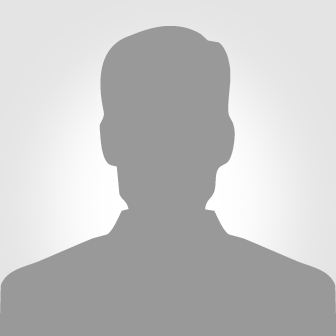
Guillermo Mariotto

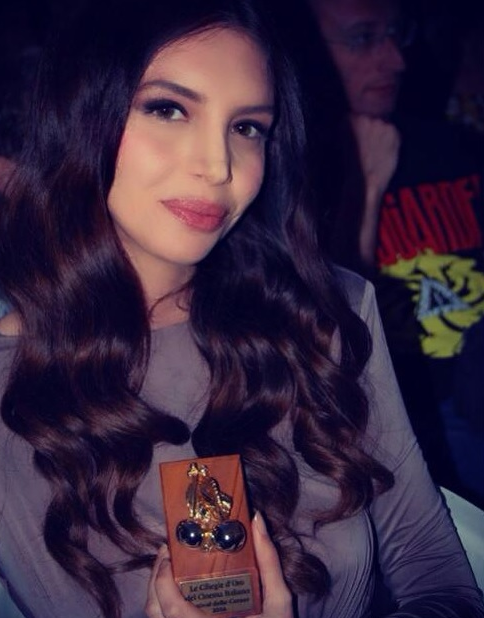
Ilenia Pastorelli

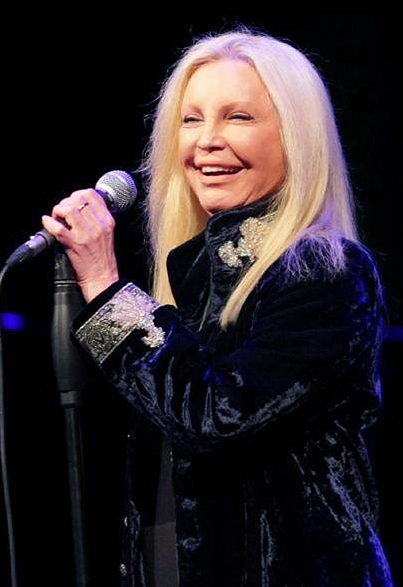
Patty Pravo

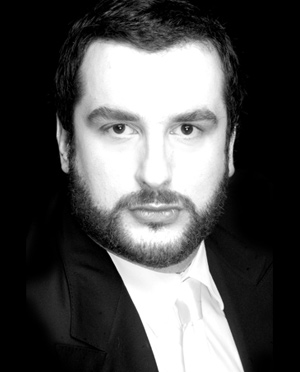
Costantino della Gherardesca

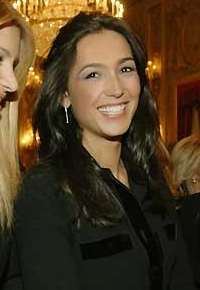
Caterina Balivo

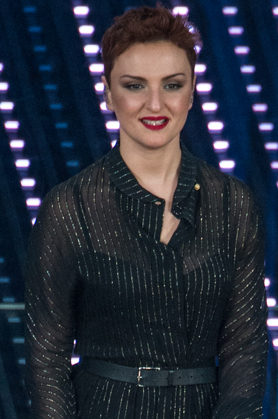
Arisa

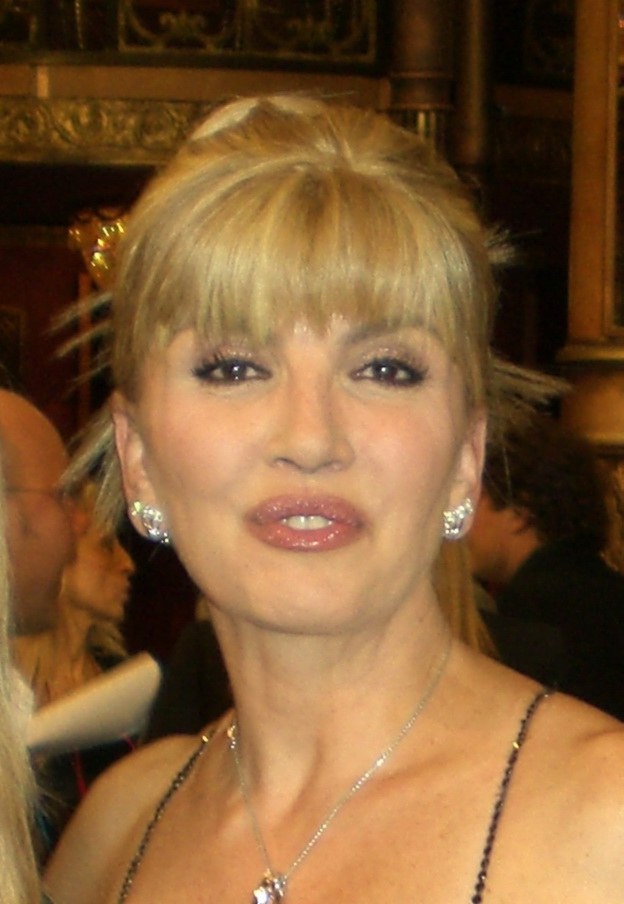
Milly Carlucci

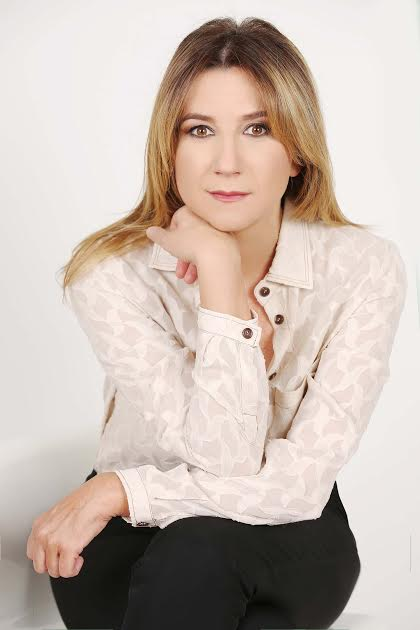
Serena Bortone

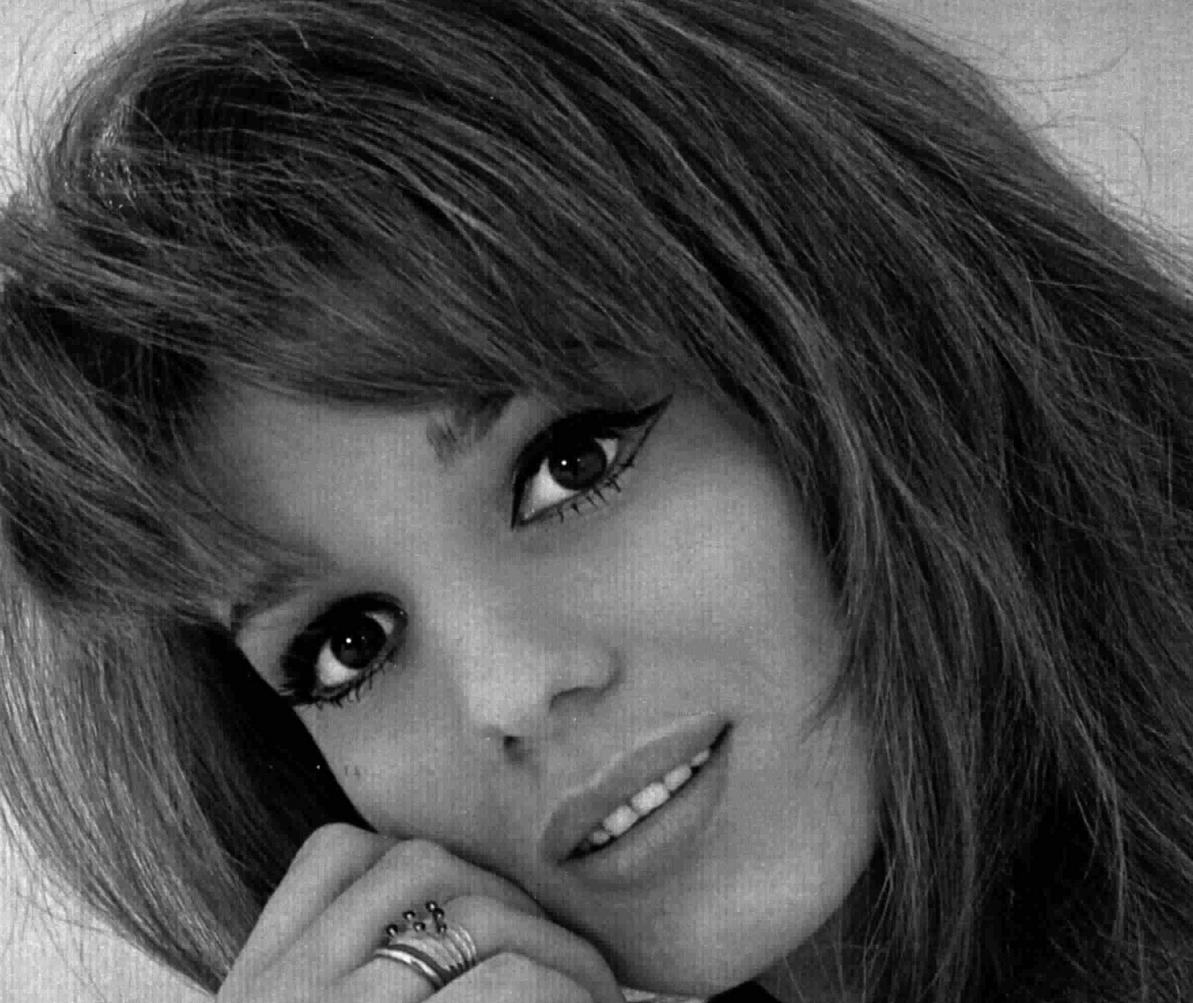
Iva Zanicchi

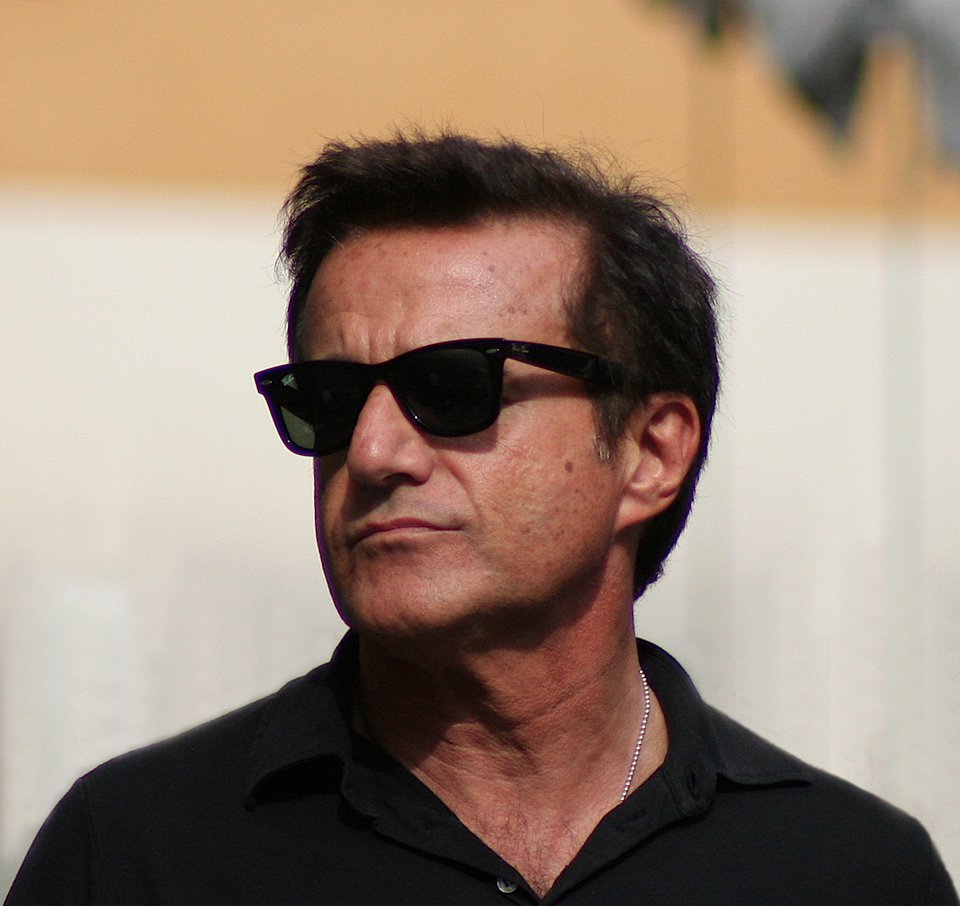
Christian De Sica

Following the announcement, it was confirmed by Rai 1 through the official Instagram account of the program, that the judging panel would consist of musician, TV presenter and producer Francesco Facchinetti, TV presenter and comedian Flavio Insinna, fashion designer Guillermo Mariotto (who is also a judge on Ballando con le Stelle), actress Ilenia Pastorelli, and singer Patty Pravo. It was also confirmed that Milly Carlucci would host the show, acting also as art director. In Season 2, Guillermo Mariotto and Ilenia Pastorelli were replaced by Costantino della Gherardesca and Caterina Balivo as members of the jury. During season 2 Al Bano appeared as a guest panellist in episode 3.

Cast Member	Seasons			
Cast Member	1	2	3	4
Cast Member	Host			
Milly Carlucci	Main	Main	Main	Main
Panelists
Francesco Facchinetti	Main	Main	Main	Main
Flavio Insinna	Main	Main	Main	Main
Patty Pravo	Main	Main		
Guillermo Mariotto	Main			
Ilenia Pastorelli	Main			
Costantino della Gherardesca		Main		
Caterina Balivo		Main	Main	
Arisa			Main	
Iva Zanicchi			Guest	Main
Al Bano		Guest		
Serena Bortone				Main
Christian De Sica				Main

== Series overview ==
Series overview
Season	Contestants	Episodes	Originally released		Winner	Runner-up	Third place
Season	Contestants	Episodes	First released	Last released	Winner	Runner-up	Third place
1	8	4	January 10, 2020	January 31, 2020	Teo Mammucari as "Rabbit"	Al Bano as "Lion"	Alessandro Greco as "Mastiff"
2	10	5	January 29, 2021	February 26, 2021	Red Canzian as "Parrot"	Mietta as "Butterfly"	Max Giusti as "Wolf"
3	15	7	February 11, 2022	April 1, 2022	Paolo Conticini as "Fox"	Lino Banfi and Rosanna Banfi as "Chick"	Riccardo Rossi as "Chameleon"
4	12	6	March 18, 2023	April 22, 2023	Samuel Peron as "Venetian Knight"	Nino Frassica as "Donkey"	Massimo Lopez as "Hedgehog"

== Season 1 (2020) ==
Stage name	Celebrity	Occupation	Episodes			
Stage name	Celebrity	Occupation	1	2	3	4
Coniglio (Rabbit)	Teo Mammucari	TV host	SAFE	SAFE	WIN	WINNER
Leone (Lion)	Al Bano	Singer	SAFE	SAFE	WIN	RUNNER-UP
Mastino napoletano (Neapolitan Mastiff)	Alessandro Greco	TV host	RISK	RISK	RISK	THIRD
Angelo (Angel)	Valerio Scanu	Singer	SAFE	SAFE	WIN	FINALIST
Mostro (Monster)	Fausto Leali	Singer	SAFE	SAFE	OUT	
Pavone (Peacock)	Emanuela Aureli	Impressionist	SAFE	SAFE	OUT	
Barboncino (Poodle)	Arisa	Singer	SAFE	OUT		
Unicorno (Unicorn)	Orietta Berti	Singer	OUT			

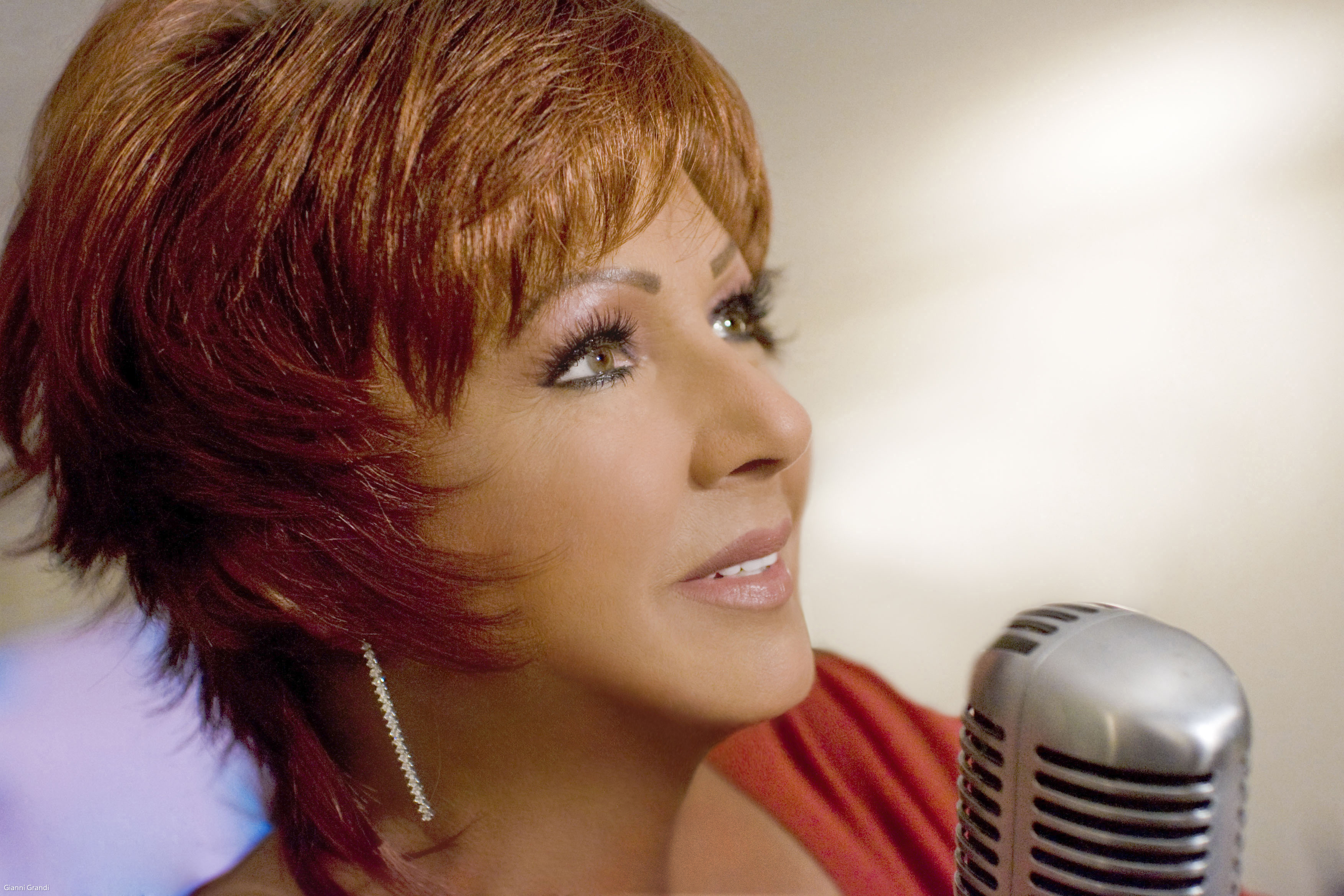
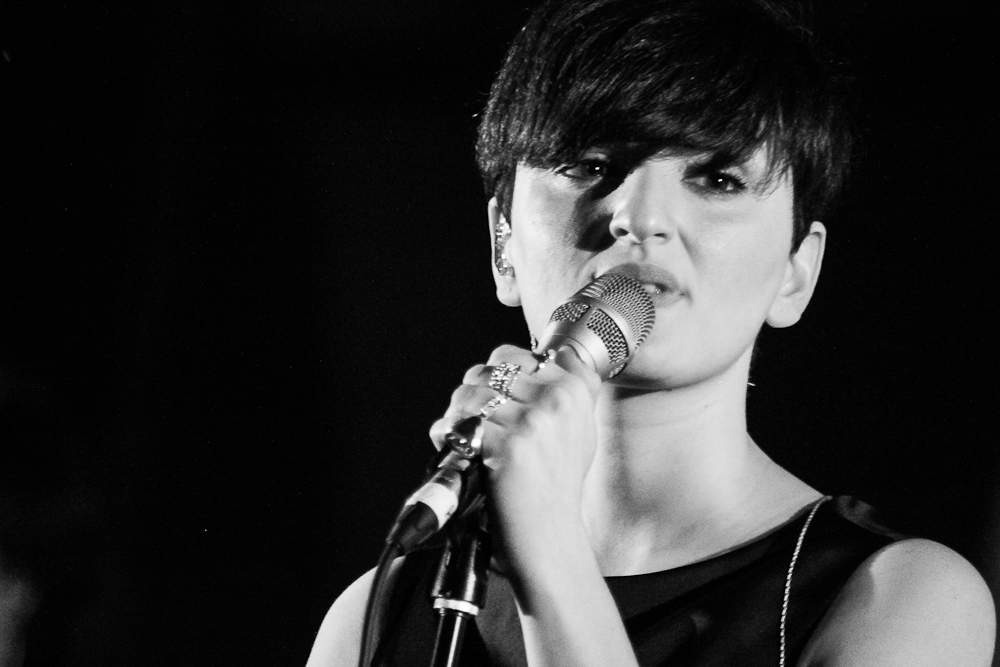
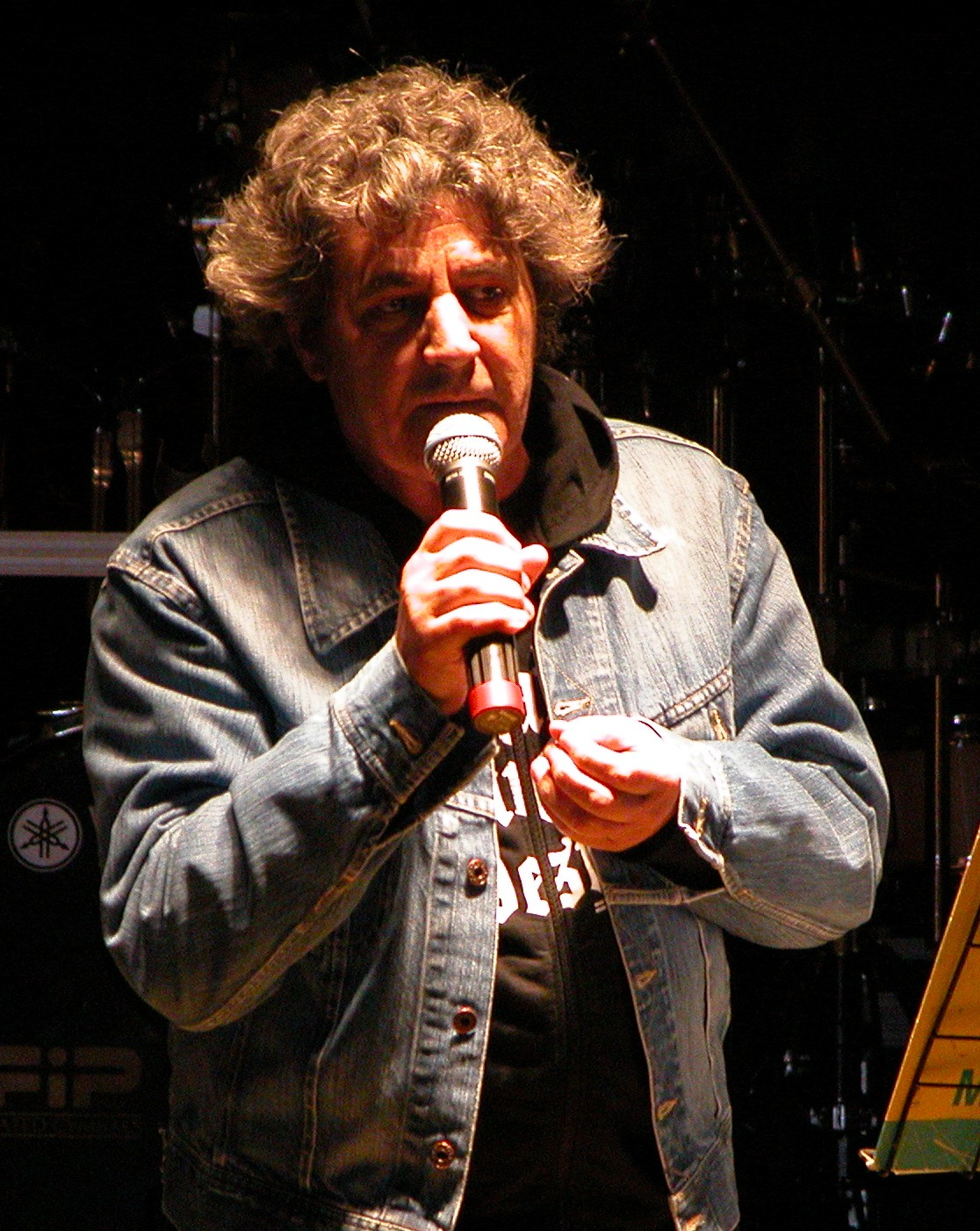
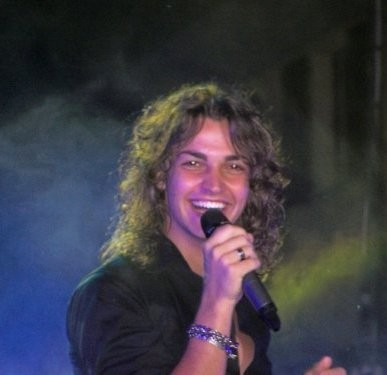
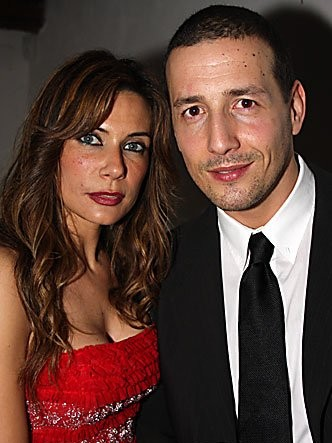
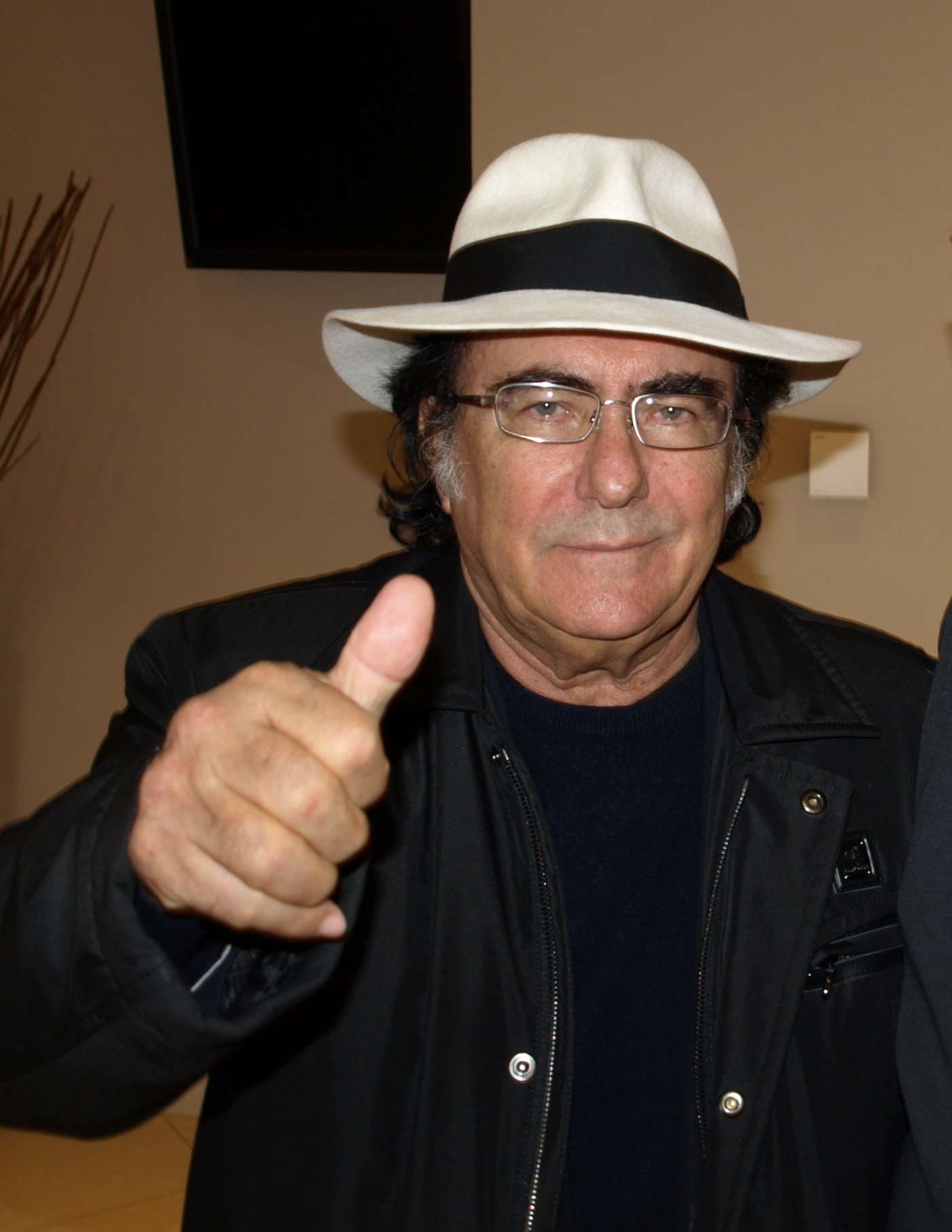
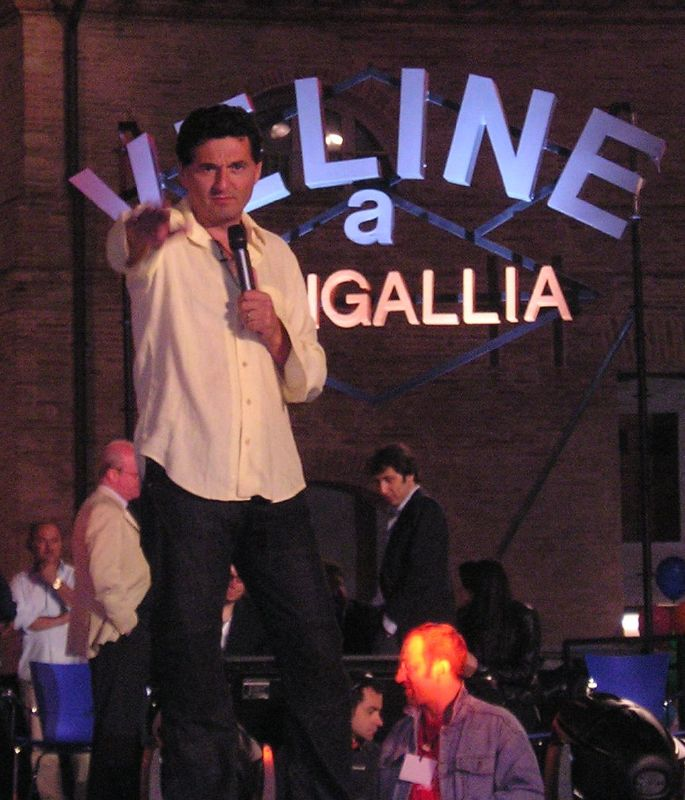
The celebrities who competed in the first season of Il cantante mascherato, pictured in order of elimination (l-r):

Orietta Berti ("Unicorn"), Arisa ("Poodle"), Fausto Leali ("Monster"), Valerio Scanu ("Angel"), Alessandro Greco ("Mastiff"), Al Bano ("Lion"), Teo Mammucari ("Rabbit").

Not pictured: Emanuela Aureli ("Peacock").
The masked singer was safe from elimination.
The masked singer was at risk but was safe from elimination.
The masked singer was eliminated from the competition and unmasked upon their elimination.
The masked singer withdrew from the competition and unmasked upon their elimination.
- Al Bano later appeared as the Sunflower on the Spanish version of the show, Mask Singer: Adivina quién canta, where he placed 5th. He is the first person to appear on The Masked Singer in two different countries. On Il cantante mascherato, he was also the first person on a non-Asian version to perform their own songs, singing his 1996 song È la mia vita in Week 2, and his 1967 song Nel sole in Week 3 (as a medley with Adriano Pappalardo's Ricominciamo).

=== Week 1 (10 January) ===
Performances on the first episode
#	Stage name	Song	Result	
1	Peacock	"Mi vendo" by Renato Zero	SAFE	
2	Rabbit	"Meraviglioso" by Negramaro	SAFE	
3	Monster	"You Shook Me All Night Long" by AC/DC	SAFE	
4	Unicorn	"E la luna bussò" by Loredana Bertè	RISK	
5	Angel	"The Sound of Silence" by Simon & Garfunkel	SAFE	
6	Neapolitan Mastiff	"'O sarracino" by Renato Carosone	RISK	
7	Poodle	"Rolling in the Deep" by Adele	SAFE	
8	Lion	"Perdere l'amore" by Massimo Ranieri	SAFE	
Sing-off details			Identity	Result
1	Unicorn	"Fotoromanza" by Gianna Nannini	Orietta Berti	OUT
2	Neapolitan Mastiff	"Andamento lento" by Tullio De Piscopo	undisclosed	SAFE

=== Week 2 (17 January) ===
Performances on the second episode
#	Stage name	Song	Result	
1	Angel	"Diavolo in Me" by Zucchero	SAFE	
2	Peacock	"La favola mia" by Renato Zero	SAFE	
3	Poodle	"Proud Mary" by Tina Turner	RISK	
4	Neapolitan Mastiff	"Caravan Petrol" by Renato Carosone	RISK	
5	Rabbit	"I tuoi particolari" by Ultimo	SAFE	
6	Monster	"Highway to Hell" by AC/DC	SAFE	
7	Lion	"È la mia vita" by Al Bano	SAFE	
Sing-off details			Identity	Result
1	Poodle	"Think" by Aretha Franklin	Arisa	OUT
2	Neapolitan Mastiff	"Yes I Know My Way" by Pino Daniele	undisclosed	SAFE

=== Week 3 (24 January) - Semi-final ===
Performances on the third episode
#	Stage name	Song	Result	
1	Rabbit	"A mano a mano" by Rino Gaetano	WIN	
2	Neapolitan Mastiff	"Como sueña el corazón" by Gigi D'Alessio	RISK	
3	Angel	"This Is Me" by Keala Settle	WIN	
4	Monster	"Shallow" by Bradley Cooper and Lady Gaga	RISK	
5	Peacock	"Se bruciasse la città" by Massimo Ranieri	RISK	
6	Lion	"Ricominciamo" by Adriano Pappalardo/"Nel sole" by Al Bano	WIN	
First sing-off details			Identity	Result
1	Peacock	"Nessuno mi può giudicare" by Caterina Caselli	Emanuela Aureli	OUT
2	Neapolitan Mastiff	"Caruso" by Lucio Dalla	undisclosed	SAFE
3	Monster	"You Never Can Tell" by Chuck Berry	undisclosed	SAFE
Second sing-off details			Identity	Result
1	Neapolitan Mastiff	"'A pizza" by Aurelio Fierro	undisclosed	SAFE
2	Monster	"Rag Doll" by Aerosmith	Fausto Leali	OUT

=== Week 4 (31 January) - Final ===
Performances on the fourth episode
#	Stage name	Song	Identity	Result
1	Angel	"Il cielo" by Renato Zero	Valerio Scanu	FINALIST
2	Rabbit	"Anna e Marco" by Lucio Dalla	undisclosed	WIN
3	Lion	"Margherita" by Riccardo Cocciante	undisclosed	WIN
4	Neapolitan Mastiff	"Reginella" by Libero Bovio	Alessandro Greco	THIRD
Final sing-off details			Identity	Result
1	Rabbit	"Bella senz'anima" by Riccardo Cocciante	Teo Mammucari	WINNER
2	Lion	"Nessun dorma" by Giacomo Puccini	Al Bano	RUNNER-UP

== Season 2 (2021) ==
Stage name	Celebrity	Occupation	Episodes						
Stage name	Celebrity	Occupation	1	2	3		4		5
Pappagallo (Parrot)	Red Canzian	Singer	SAFE	SAFE	SAFE	SAFE	SAFE	WIN	WINNER
Farfalla (Butterfly)	Mietta	Singer	SAFE	SAFE	SAFE	SAFE	RISK	RISK	RUNNER-UP
Lupo (Wolf)	Max Giusti	TV host	SAFE	SAFE	SAFE	RISK	SAFE	WIN	THIRD
Orsetto (Teddy Bear)	Simone Montedoro	Actor	SAFE	SAFE	RISK	SAFE	SAFE	OUT	
Gatto (Cat)	Sergio Assisi	Actor	SAFE	SAFE	SAFE	SAFE	OUT		
Giraffa (Giraffe)	Katia Ricciarelli	Opera singer	SAFE	SAFE	SAFE	OUT			
Tigre azzurra (Blue Tiger)	Mauro Coruzzi	Radio host	SAFE	RISK	OUT				
Baby Alieno 2 (Baby Alien 2)	Gigi e Ross	Comedians	RISK	OUT					
Pecorella (Little Lamb)	Alessandra Mussolini	Former politician	RISK	OUT					
Baby Alieno 1 (Baby Alien 1)	Ricchi e Poveri	Singers	WD						

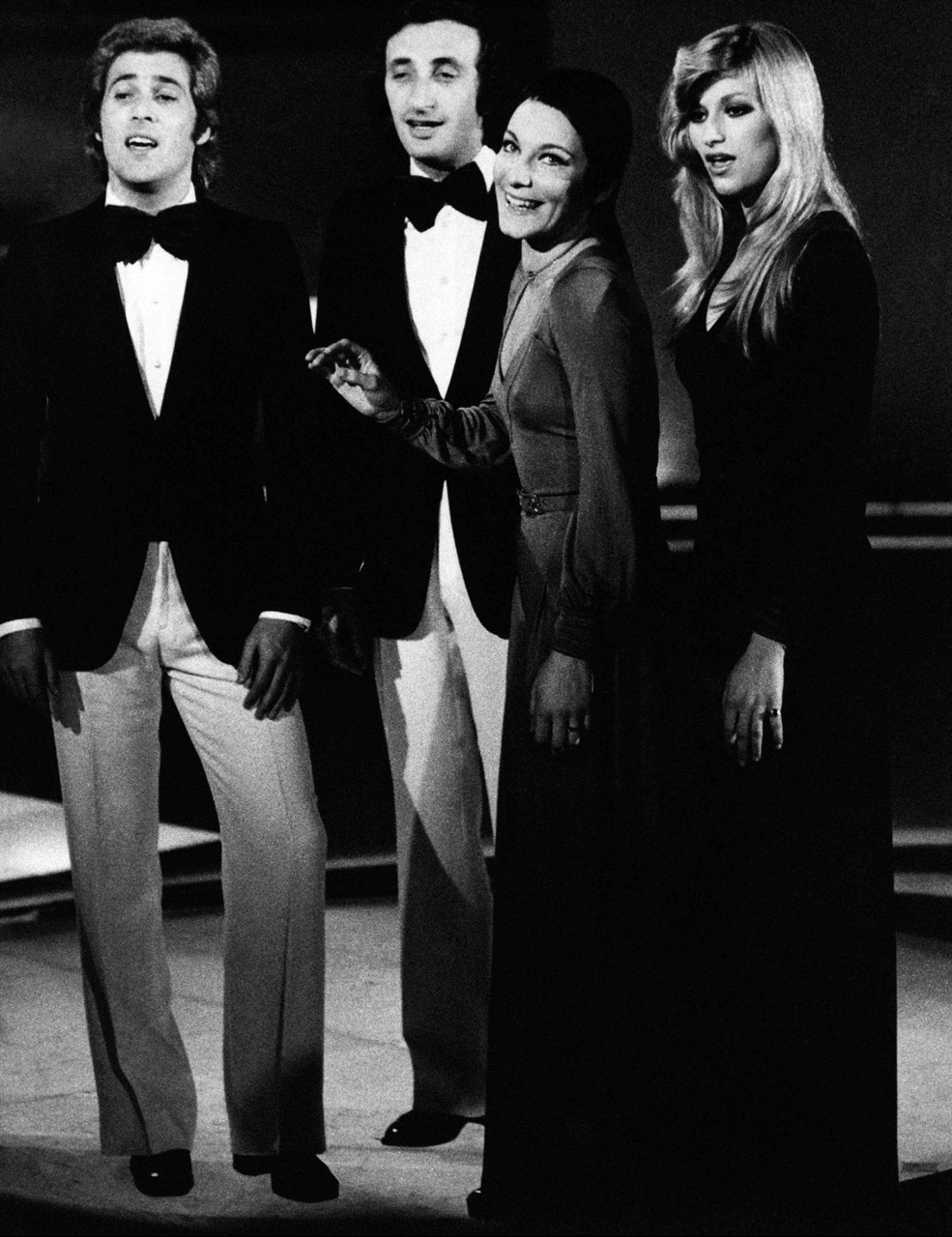
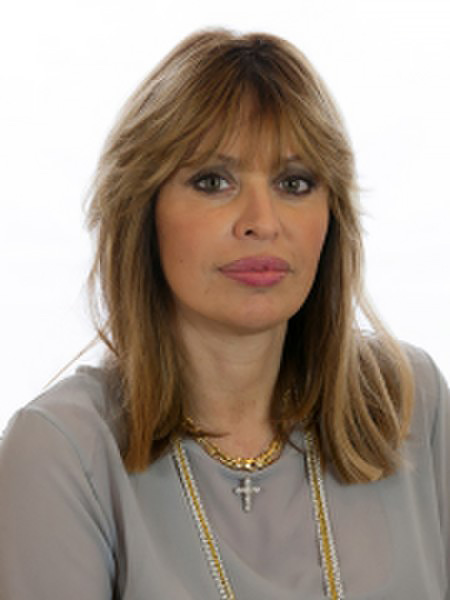
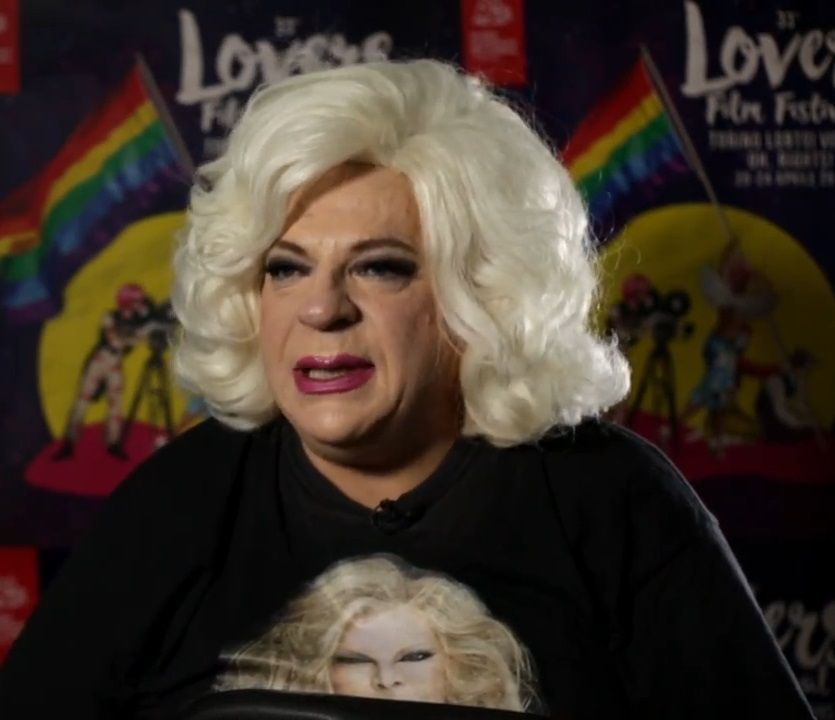
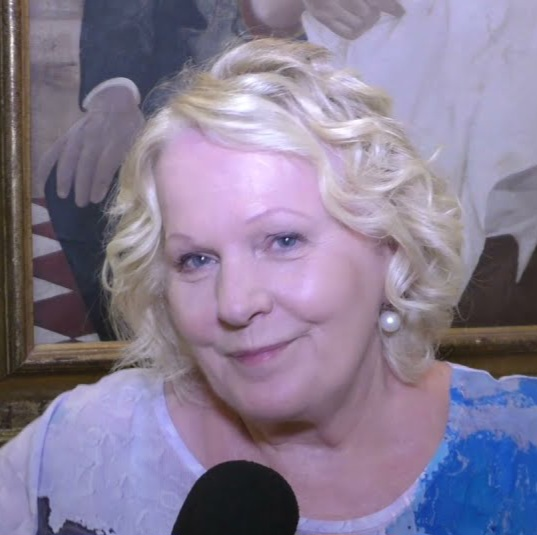
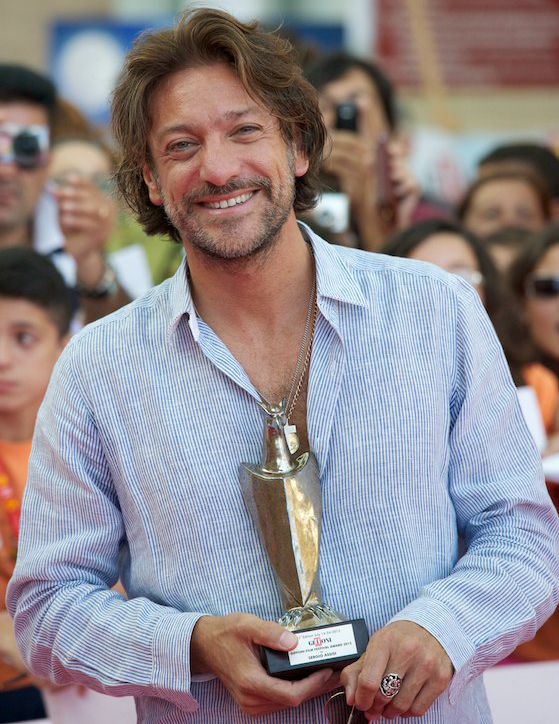
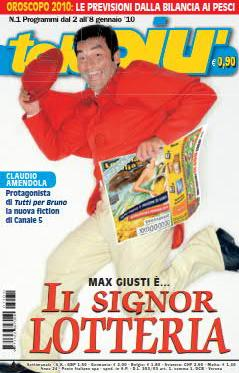
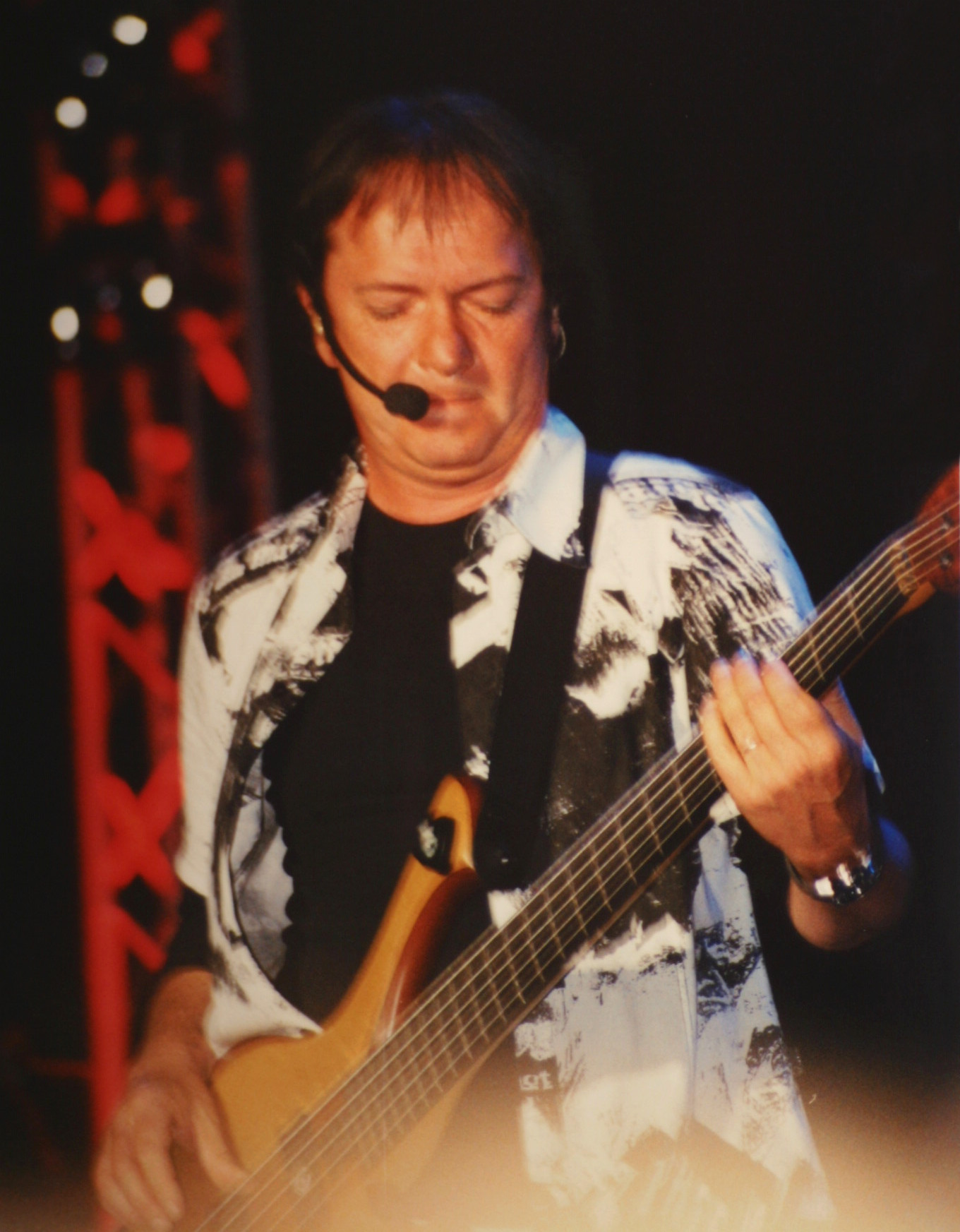
The celebrities who competed in the second season of Il cantante mascherato, pictured in order of elimination (l-r):

Ricchi e Poveri ("Baby Alien 1"), Alessandra Mussolini ("Little Lamb"), Gigi e Ross ("Baby Alien 2"), Mauro Coruzzi as Drag persona "Platinette" ("Blue Tiger"), Katia Ricciarelli ("Giraffe"), Sergio Assisi ("Cat"), Simone Montedoro ("Teddy Bear"), Max Giusti ("Wolf"), Mietta ("Butterfly"), Red Canzian ("Parrot").

Not pictured: Gigi e Ross ("Baby Alien 2"), Simone Montedoro ("Teddy Bear").
The masked singer was safe from elimination.
The masked singer was at risk but was safe from elimination.
The masked singer was eliminated from the competition and unmasked upon their elimination.
The masked singer withdrew from the competition and unmasked upon their elimination.

=== Week 1 (29 January) ===
Performances on the first episode
#	Stage name	Song	Result	
1	Butterfly	"Mentre tutto scorre" by Negramaro	SAFE	
2	Teddy Bear	"Andavo a cento all'ora" by Gianni Morandi	SAFE	
3	Wolf	"I giardini di marzo" by Lucio Battisti	SAFE	
4	Baby Alien 1	Medley Luna	RISK	
5	Little Lamb	"Diamonds Are a Girl's Best Friend" by Marilyn Monroe	RISK	
6	Blue Tiger	"L'immensità" by Johnny Dorelli	SAFE	
7	Cat	"Smooth Criminal" by Michael Jackson	SAFE	
8	Giraffe	"Roma-Bangkok" by Baby K feat. Giusy Ferreri	SAFE	
9	Parrot	"The Greatest Show" from The Greatest Showman	SAFE	
First sing-off details			Identity	Result
1	Baby Alien 1	Medley Stella	Ricchi e Poveri	WD
2	Little Lamb	-	undisclosed	SAFE

=== Week 2 (5 February) ===
Sing-off details		Song	Identity	Result
1	Baby Alien 2	"Sarà perché ti amo" by Ricchi e Poveri	undisclosed	SAFE
2	Little Lamb	"La notte vola" by Lorella Cuccarini	Alessandra Mussolini	OUT

Performances on the second episode
#	Stage name	Song	Result	
1	Wolf	"Cercami" by Renato Zero	SAFE	
2	Blue Tiger	"Il pescatore" by Fabrizio De André	RISK	
3	Butterfly	"Un'emozione da poco" by Anna Oxa	SAFE	
4	Teddy Bear	"Dieci ragazze" by Lucio Battisti	SAFE	
5	Parrot	"La Voce del Silenzio" by Tony Del Monaco	SAFE	
6	Cat	"It's My Life" by Bon Jovi	SAFE	
7	Giraffe	"Bam Bam Twist" by Achille Lauro	SAFE	
8	Baby Alien 2	"Triangolo" by Renato Zero	RISK	
Sing-off details			Identity	Result
1	Baby Alien 2		Gigi e Ross	OUT
2	Blue Tiger		undisclosed	SAFE

=== Week 3 (12 February) ===
==== Round One ====
Performances on the third episode - round one
#	Stage name	Song	Result	
1	Giraffe	"Felicità" by Al Bano and Romina Power	SAFE	
1	Wolf	"Felicità" by Al Bano and Romina Power	SAFE	
1	Teddy Bear	"Felicità" by Al Bano and Romina Power	RISK	
1	Cat	"Felicità" by Al Bano and Romina Power	SAFE	
1	Butterfly	"Felicità" by Al Bano and Romina Power	SAFE	
1	Parrot	"Felicità" by Al Bano and Romina Power	SAFE	
1	Blue Tiger	"Felicità" by Al Bano and Romina Power	RISK	
Sing-off details			Identity	Result
1	Blue Tiger	"La pelle nera" by Nino Ferrer	Mauro Coruzzi	OUT
2	Teddy Bear	"Ragazzo fortunato" by Jovanotti	undisclosed	SAFE

==== Round Two ====
Performances on the third episode - round two
#	Stage name	Song	Result	
1	Parrot	"I migliori anni della nostra vita" by Renato Zero	SAFE	
2	Wolf	"Chi fermerà la musica" by Pooh	RISK	
3	Cat	"E dimmi che non vuoi morire" by Patty Pravo	SAFE	
4	Giraffe	"Una Vita In Vacanza" by Lo Stato Sociale	RISK	
5	Butterfly	"Adrenalina" by Wisin feat. Ricky Martin and Jennifer Lopez	SAFE	
6	Teddy Bear	"24.000 baci" by Adriano Celentano	SAFE	
Sing-off details			Identity	Result
1	Giraffe		Katia Ricciarelli	OUT
2	Wolf		undisclosed	SAFE

=== Week 4 (19 February) - Semi-final ===
==== Round One ====
Performances on the fourth episode - round one
#	Stage name	Song	Result	
1	Wolf	"Non mollare mai" by Gigi D'Alessio	SAFE	
2	Teddy Bear	"50 Special" by Lùnapop	SAFE	
3	Parrot	"Il mondo" by Jimmy Fontana	SAFE	
4	Cat	"Mamma Mia" by ABBA	RISK	
5	Butterfly	"Nessun dolore" by Lucio Battisti	RISK	
Sing-off details			Identity	Result
1	Cat		Sergio Assisi	OUT
2	Butterfly		undisclosed	SAFE

==== Round Two ====
Performances on the fourth episode - round two
#	Stage name	Song	Result
1	Wolf	"Sabato pomeriggio" by Claudio Baglioni	WIN
2	Teddy Bear	"Sono solo canzonette" by Edoardo Bennato	RISK
3	Parrot	"What a Wonderful World" by Joey Ramone	WIN
4	Butterfly	"Nel blu, dipinto di blu" by Domenico Modugno	RISK

=== Week 5 (26 February) - Final ===
Sing-off
Sing-off details			Identity	Result
1	Teddy Bear	"Ti porto via con me" by Jovanotti	Simone Montedoro	OUT
2	Butterfly	"Mi sei scoppiato dentro il cuore" by Mina	undisclosed	SAFE

Performances on the fifth episode
#	Stage name	Song	Identity	Result
1	Wolf & Anna Tatangelo	"Se bruciasse la città" by Massimo Ranieri	Max Gusti	THIRD
2	Butterfly & Red Canzian	"Un amore così grande" by Claudio Villa	undisclosed	SAFE
3	Parrot & Rita Pavone	"Una ragione di più" by Ornella Vanoni	undisclosed	SAFE
Final sing-off details			Identity	Result
1	Butterfly	"Nessun dolore" by Giorgia	Mietta	RUNNER-UP
2	Parrot	"Gimme Some Lovin'" by The Spencer Davis Group	Red Canzian	WINNER

== Season 3 (2022) ==
Stage name	Celebrity	Occupation	Episodes						
Stage name	Celebrity	Occupation	1	2	3	4	5	6	7
Volpe (Fox)	Paolo Conticini	Actor	SAFE	RISK	WIN	WIN	WIN	WIN	WINNER
Pulcino (Chick) (Note: Pulcino was announced as a new mask to join the running for the show at the first part of Semi-Finals. They were introduced at the second part of the Semis.)	Lino Banfi	Actors						WIN	RUNNERS-UP
Pulcino (Chick)	Rosanna Banfi	Actors						WIN	RUNNERS-UP
Camaleonte (Chameleon)	Riccardo Rossi	Actor	SAFE	WIN	WIN	WIN	WIN	RISK	THIRD
Lumaca (Snail)	Giancarlo Magalli	Actor	SAFE	WIN	WIN	RISK	RISK	WIN	FINALIST
Lumaca (Snail)	Michela Magalli	Influencer	SAFE	WIN	WIN	RISK	RISK	WIN	FINALIST
SoleLuna (Sun and Moon)	Cristiano Malgioglio	Singer	SAFE	RISK	RISK	RISK (Note: While put at risk of elimination, Caterina Balivo tried to have SoleLuna unmask using her Golden Mask. The attempt was unsuccessful as her guess was incorrect which allowed the mask in question to go straight to the Semi-Finals.)	RISK (Note: While put at risk of elimination, Francesco Facchinetti tried to have SoleLuna unmask using his Golden Mask. The attempt was unsuccessful as his guess was incorrect which allowed the mask in question to go straight to the second part of the Semi-Finals.)	RISK	FINALIST
Pinguino 2 (Penguin 2) (Note: Pinguino 1 did a self elimination and was replaced by a second Pinguino in the Quarterfinals.)	Gabriele Cirilli	Comedian				WIN	WIN	OUT	
Gatta (Lady Cat) (Note: Gatta was announced as a new mask to join the running for the show at the first part of Semi-Finals. They were introduced at the second part of the Semis.)	Eleonora Giorgi	Actress						OUT	
Medusa (Jellyfish)	Bianca Guaccero	Actress	SAFE	WIN	WIN	WIN	OUT		
Drago (Dragon)	Simone Di Pasquale	Dancer	SAFE	RISK	RISK	RISK	OUT		
Pesce Rosso (Goldfish)	Vladimir Luxuria	Activist	RISK	WIN	RISK	OUT			
Pastore Maremmano (Maremma Sheepdog)	Riccardo Fogli	Singer	SAFE	WIN	RISK	OUT			
Pinguino 1 (Penguin 1)	Edoardo Vianello	Singer	SAFE	RISK	WD (Note: Pinguino 1 due to heat and weight decided to self-eliminate instead of continuing in the show.)				
Cavalluccio Marino (Seahorse)	Cristina D'Avena	Singer	SAFE	OUT					
Aquila (Eagle)	Alba Parietti	Television presenter	RISK	OUT					
Gallina (Hen)	Fiordaliso	Singer	OUT						

The masked singer was safe from elimination.
The masked singer was at risk but was safe from elimination.
The masked singer was eliminated from the competition and unmasked upon their elimination.
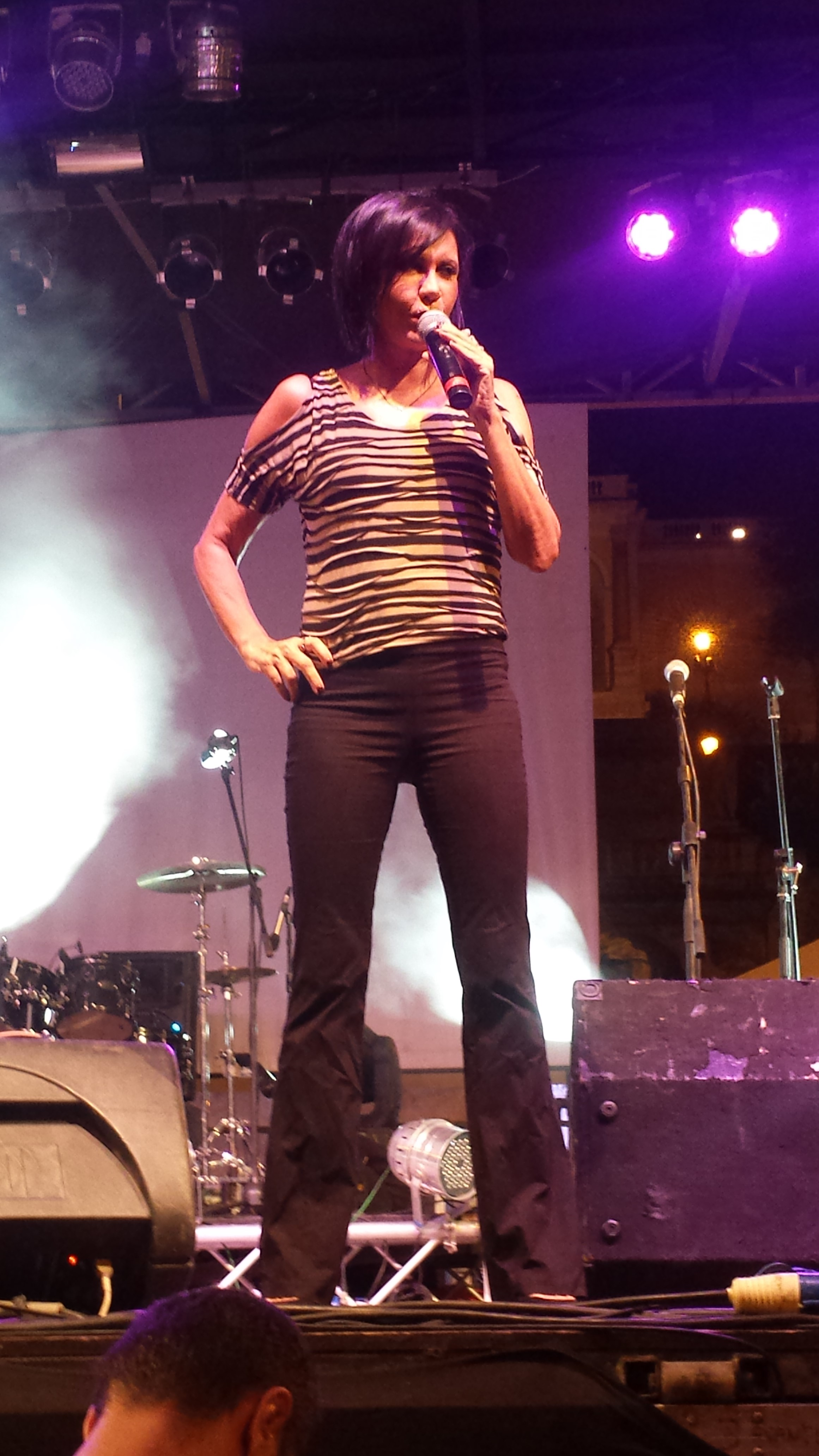
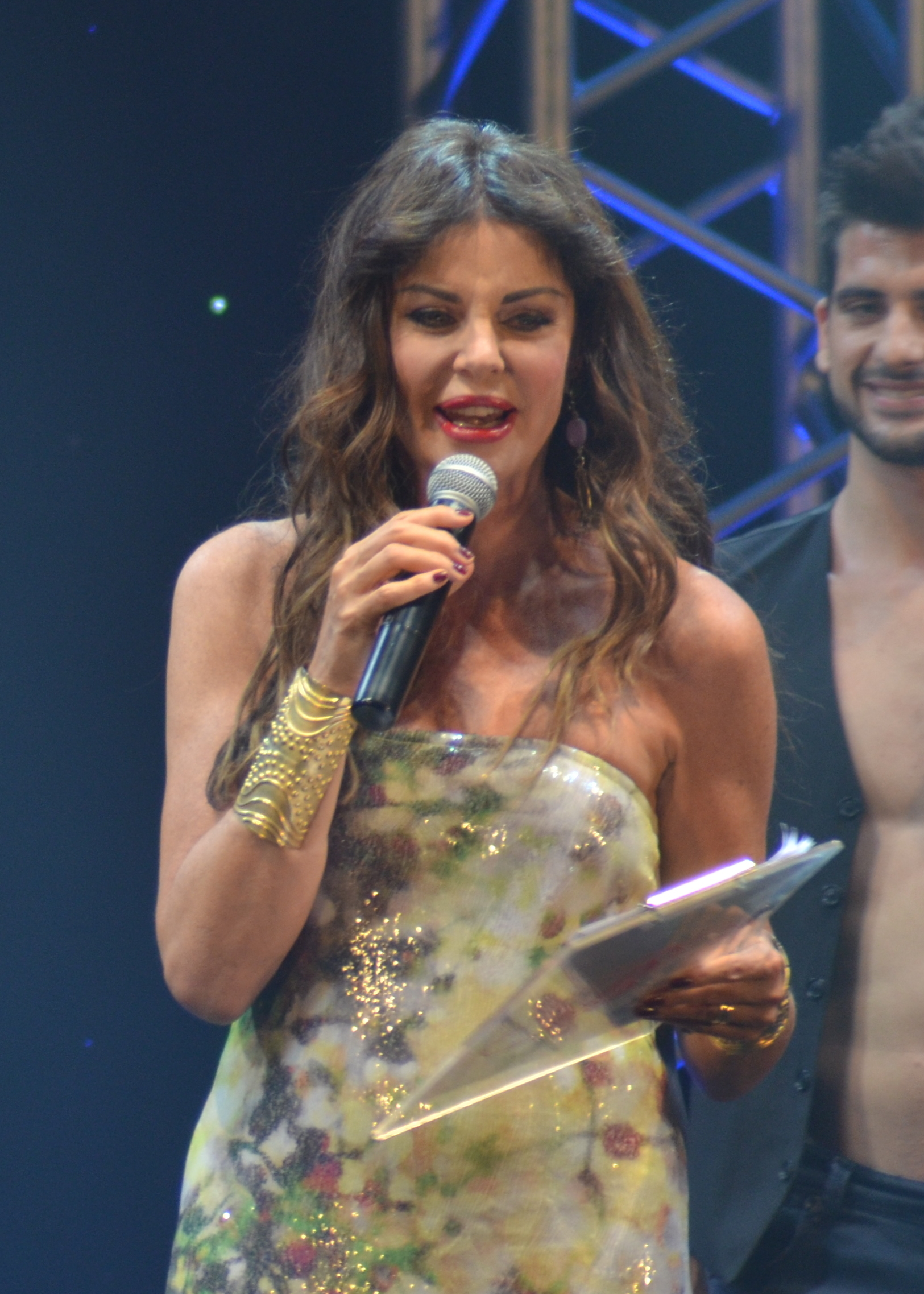
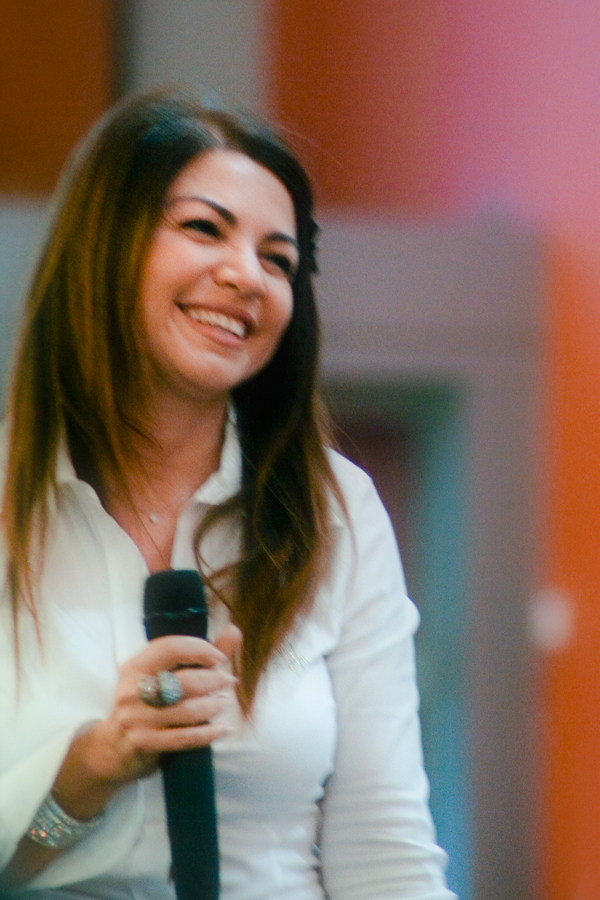
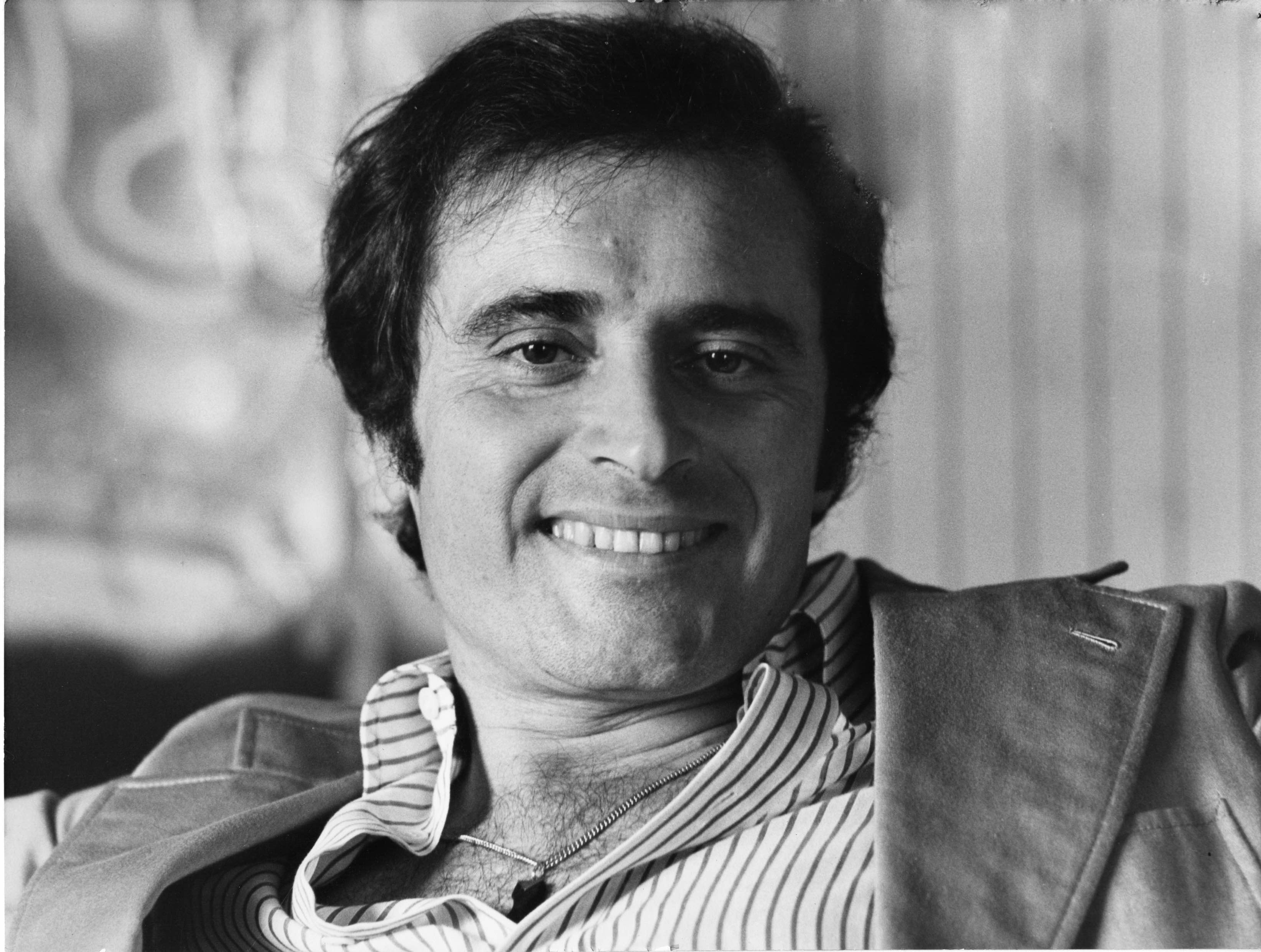
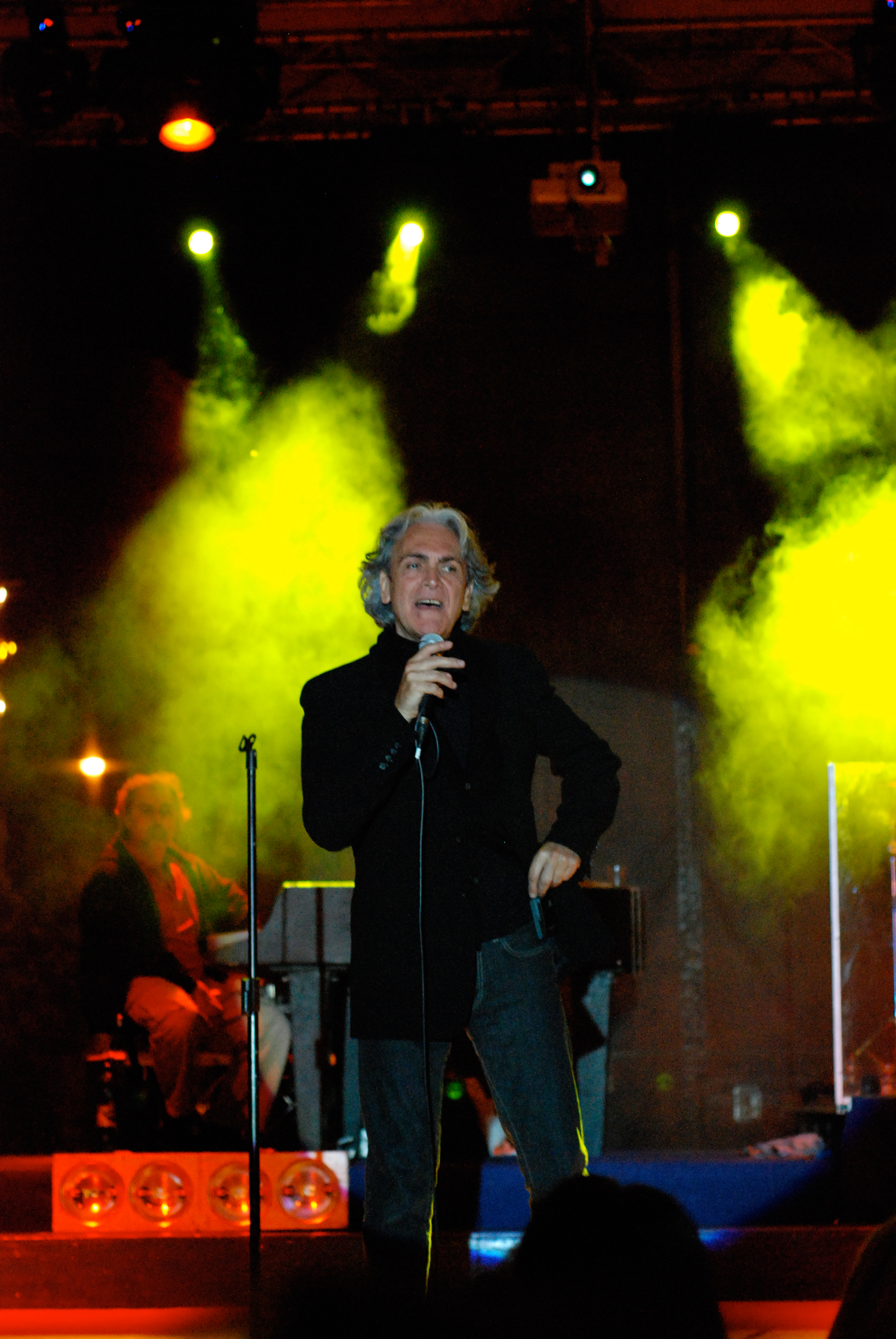
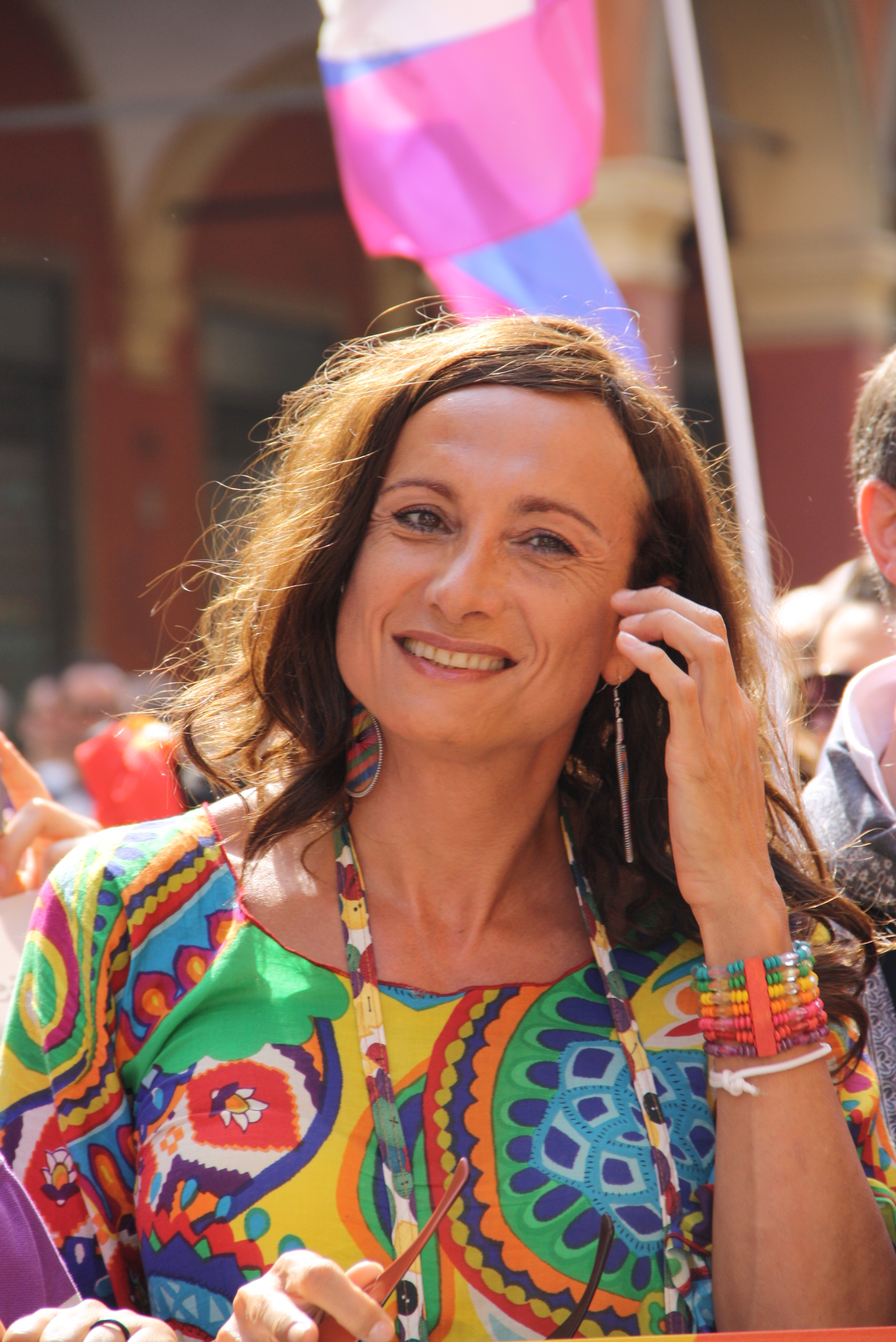
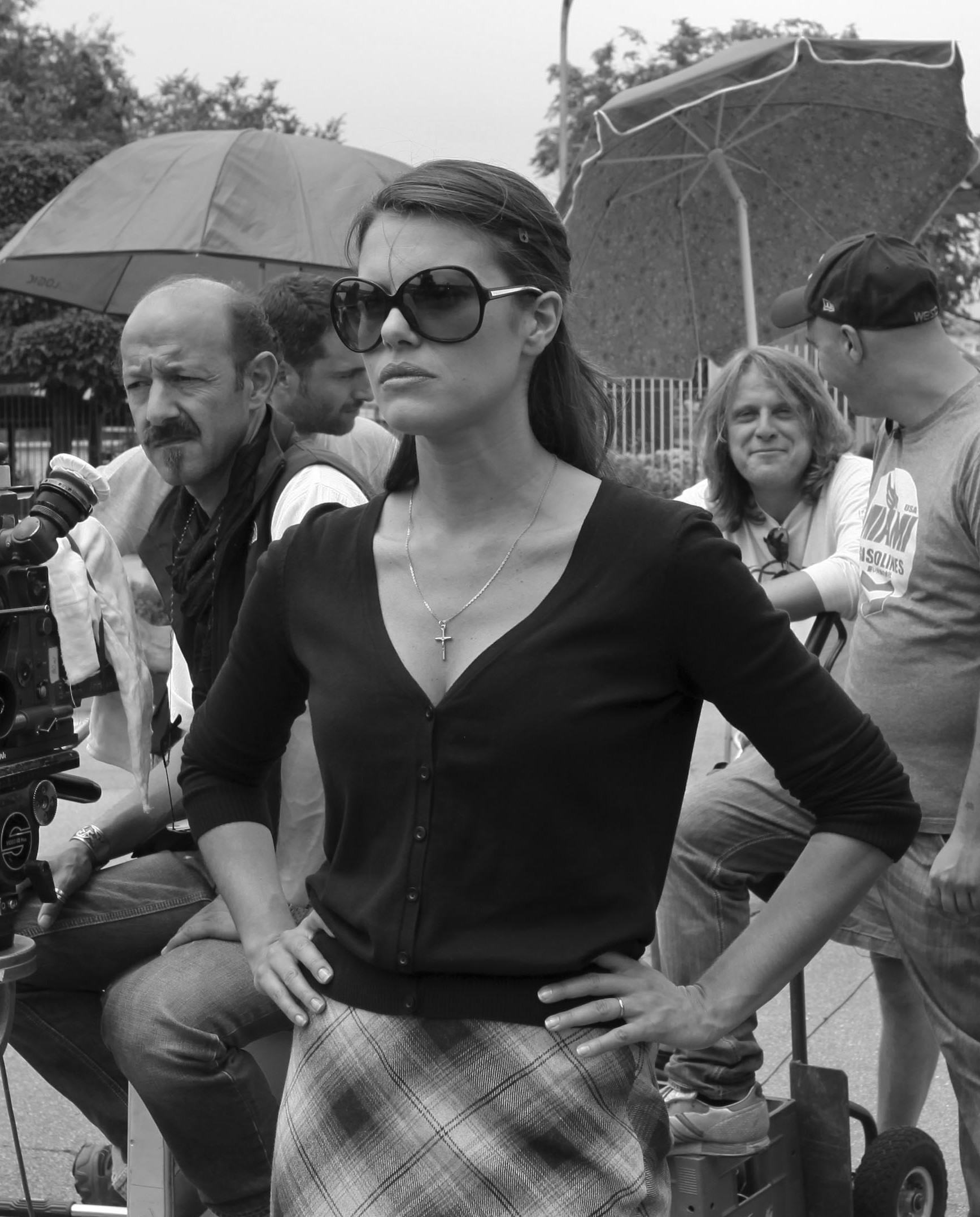
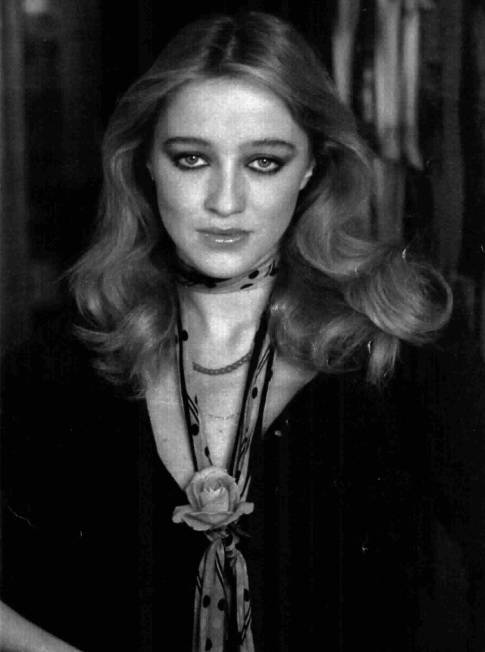
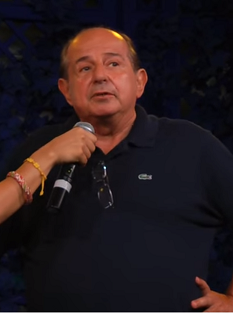
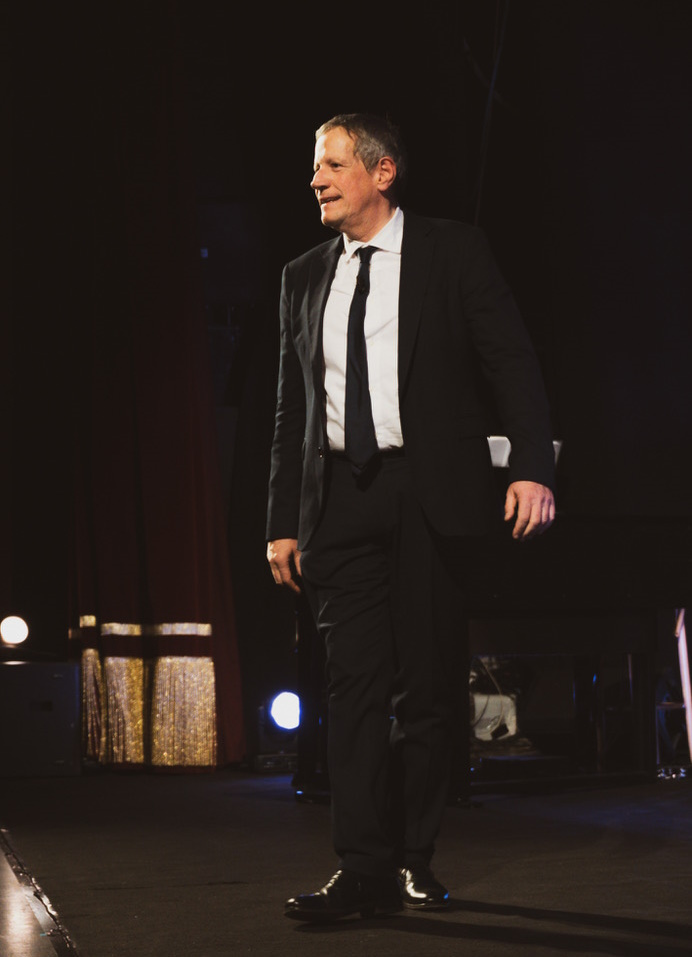
The celebrities who competed in the third season of Il cantante mascherato, pictured in order of elimination (l-r):

Fiordaliso ("Hen"), Alba Parietti ("Eagle"), Cristina D'Avena ("Seahorse"), Edoardo Vianello ("Penguin 1"), Riccardo Fogli ("Maremma Sheepdog"), Vladimir Luxuria ("Goldfish"), Bianca Guaccero ("Jellyfish"), Eleonora Giorgi ("Lady Cat"). Cristiano Malgioglio ("Sun and Moon"). Giancarlo Magalli ("Snail"). Lino Banfi & Rosanna Banfi ("Chick"). Paolo Conticini ("Fox"). Riccardo Rossi ("Chameleon").

Not pictured: Simone Di Pasquale ("Dragon"), Gabriele Cirilli ("Penguin 2"). Michela Magalli ("Snail")

=== Week 1 (11 February) ===
Performances on the first episode
#	Stage name	Song	Result	
1	Fox & I Cugini di Campagna	"Zitti e buoni" by Måneskin	SAFE	
2	Jellyfish & Cristiano Malgioglio	"L'importante è finire" by Mina	SAFE	
3	Snail & Orietta Berti	"Mille" by Fedez, Achille Lauro and Orietta Berti	SAFE	
4	Hen & Edoardo Vianello	"Per colpa di chi?" by Zucchero Fornaciari	RISK	
5	Dragon & Marco Masini	"Guerriero" by Marco Mengoni	SAFE	
6	Chameleon & Riccardo Fogli	"Sono solo canzonette" by Edoardo Bennato	SAFE	
7	Sun and Moon & Arisa	"La notte" by Arisa	SAFE	
8	Penguin & Cristina D'Avena	"Il pinguino innamorato" by Trio Lescano	SAFE	
9	Eagle & Morgan	"A mano a mano" by Riccardo Cocciante	RISK	
10	Goldfish & Memo Remigi	"Le mille bolle blu" by Mina	RISK	
11	Maremma sheepdog & Fausto Leali	"Mi manchi" by Fausto Leali	SAFE	
12	Seahorse & Mietta	"Bad Romance" by Lady Gaga	SAFE	
Sing-off details			Identity	Result
1	Eagle		undisclosed	SAFE
2	Goldfish		undisclosed	SAFE
3	Hen		Fiordaliso	OUT

=== Week 2 (18 February) ===
Sing-off
Sing-off details		Song	Identity	Result
1	Goldfish	"A far l'amore comincia tu"/"Tanti auguri" by Raffaella Carrà	undisclosed	SAFE
2	Eagle	"Minuetto" by Mia Martini	Alba Parietti	OUT

Performances on the second episode
#	Stage name	Guest artist	Song	Result	
1	Chameleon	Dodi Battaglia	"Piccola Katy" by Pooh	WIN	
2	Fox	Dodi Battaglia	"Tanta Voglia di Lei" by Pooh	RISK	
3	Jellyfish	Iva Zanicchi	"Zingara" by Iva Zanicchi	WIN	
4	Sun & Moon	Iva Zanicchi	"Testarda io, la mia solitudine" by Iva Zanicchi	RISK	
5	Penguin	Paolo Belli	"Sotto questo sole" by Francesco Baccini & Ladri di Biciclette	RISK	
6	Snail	Paolo Belli	"La prima cosa bella" by Ricchi e Poveri	WIN	
7	Maremma Sheepdog	Morgan	"Io che non vivo" by Pino Donaggio	WIN	
8	Dragon	Morgan	"Altrove" by Morgan	RISK	
9	Seahorse	Peppino di Capri	"St. Tropez Twist" by Peppino di Capri	RISK	
10	Goldfish	Peppino di Capri	"Un grande amore e niente più" by Peppino di Capri	WIN	
Sing-off details				Identity	Result
1	Fox			undisclosed	SAFE
2	Sun & Moon			undisclosed	SAFE
3	Penguin			undisclosed	SAFE
4	Dragon			undisclosed	SAFE
5	Seahorse			Cristina D'Avena	OUT

=== Week 3 (4 March) ===
Sing-off
Sing-off details		Song	Identity	Result
1	Penguin	"Gelato al Cioccolato" by Pupo/"Abbronzatissima" by Edoardo Vianello	Edoardo Vianello	WD
2	Dragon	"Stayin' Alive" by Bee Gees/"Disco Inferno" by The Trammps	-	SAFE

Performances on the third episode
#	Stage name	Guest artist	Song	Result	
1	Goldfish	Fiordaliso	"Non voglio mica la luna" by Fiordaliso	RISK	
2	Jellyfish	Fiordaliso	"Amandoti" by CCCP	WIN	
3	Snail	Cristina D'Avena	"Ciao ciao" by La Rappresentante di Lista	WIN	
4	Dragon	Cristina D'Avena	"Sere nere" by Tiziano Ferro	RISK	
5	Fox	Arisa	"Controvento" by Arisa	WIN	
6	Maremma Sheepdog	Arisa	"Meraviglioso amore mio" by Arisa	RISK	
7	Sun & Moon	Mietta	"Splendido splendente" by Donatella Rettore	RISK	
8	Chameleon	Mietta	"Dove Si Balla" by Dargen D'Amico	WIN	
Sing-off details			Song	Result	
1	Goldfish	Monica Mancini	"Pippo Non Lo Sa" by Rita Pavone	undisclosed	SAFE
2	Dragon	Toto Cutugno	"Charlie è Una Lenza" by Corrado	undisclosed	RISK
3	Maremma Sheepdog	Alexia	"Mamma Maria" by Ricchi E Poveri	undisclosed	RISK
4	Sun & Moon	Tiziano Ferro	"Importante" by Marracash	undisclosed	SAFE

=== Week 4 (11 March) ===
Sing-off
Sing-off details		Song	Identity	Result
1	Dragon	"Summer Nights"/"Greased Lightnin'" by John Travolta & Olivia Newton-John	undisclosed	SAFE
2	Maremma Sheepdog	"Regina di cuori" by Litfiba/"Storie di tutti i giorni" by Riccardo Fogli	Riccardo Fogli	OUT

Performances on the fourth episode
#	Stage name	Guest artist	Song	Result	
1	Jellyfish	Donatella Rettore	"Chimica" by Ditonellapiaga & Donatella Rettore	WIN	
2	Goldfish	Donatella Rettore	"Kobra" by Donatella Rettore	RISK	
3	Snail	Edoardo Vianello	"Apri tutte le porte" by Gianni Morandi	RISK	
4	Penguin 2	Edoardo Vianello	"Sul cucuzzolo" by Edoardo Vianello	WIN	
5	Chameleon	Francesco Facchinetti	"La canzone del capitano" by Francesco Facchinetti	WIN	
6	Sun & Moon	Francesco Facchinetti	"Ragazzo fortunato" by Jovanotti/"Figli delle stelle" by Alan Sorrenti	RISK	
7	Fox	Iva Zanicchi	"Voglio amarti" by Iva Zanicchi	WIN	
8	Dragon	Iva Zanicchi	"Le montagne" by Iva Zanicchi	RISK	
Sing-off details				Identity	Result
1	Goldfish			Vladimir Luxuria	OUT
2	Snail			undisclosed	SAFE
3	Dragon			undisclosed	SAFE

=== Week 5 (18 March) ===
Sing-off
Sing-off details		Song	Identity	Result
1	Dragon	"Wake Me Up Before You Go-Go"/"Careless Whisper" by Wham!	Simone Di Pasquale	OUT
2	Snail	"Andavo a Cento All'ora" by Gianni Morandi	undisclosed	SAFE

Performances on the fifth episode
#	Stage name	Guest artist	Song	Result
1	Fox	Red Canzian	"Uomini soli" by Pooh	WIN
2	Jellyfish	Red Canzian	"Noi due nel mondo e nell'anima" by Pooh	RISK
3	Chameleon	Ivana Spagna	"Call Me" by Ivana Spagna	WIN
4	Snail	Ivana Spagna	"Easy Lady" by Ivana Spagna	RISK
5	Penguin 2	Orietta Berti	"Fin che la barca va" by Orietta Berti	WIN
6	Sun & Moon	Orietta Berti	"Luna Piena" by Orietta Berti	RISK
Sing-off details		Song	Identity	Result
1	Jellyfish	"La bambola" by Patty Pravo	Bianca Guaccero	OUT
2	Snail	"Felicità" by Al Bano and Romina Power	undisclosed	SAFE

=== Week 6 (25 March) - Semi-final ===
Sing-off
Sing-off details		Song	Identity	Result
1	Snail	"Ciao Ciao" by La rappresentante di lista	undisclosed	SAFE
2	Chick	"Medley" by Jovanotti e Renato Carosone	undisclosed	SAFE
3	Lady Cat	"La gatta" by Gino Paoli	Eleonora Giorgi	OUT

Performances on the sixth episode
#	Stage name	Guest artist	Song	Result
1	Sun & Moon	Al Bano	"Nostalgia canaglia" by Al Bano & Romina Power	RISK
2	Fox	Al Bano	"È la mia vita" by Al Bano	WIN
3	Penguin 2	Arisa	"Mi sento bene" by Arisa	RISK
4	Chick	Arisa	"Sincerità" by Arisa	WIN
5	Snail	Gigi D'Alessio	"Non mollare mai" by Gigi D'Alessio	WIN
6	Cameleon	Gigi D'Alessio	"Mon amour" by Gigi D'Alessio	RISK
Sing-off details		Song	Identity	Result
1	Sun & Moon	"Figli delle stelle" by Alan Sorrenti	undisclosed	SAFE
2	Penguin 2	"Il pinguino innamorato" by Trio Lescano	Gabriele Cirilli	OUT

=== Week 7 (1 April) - Final ===
Sing-off
Sing-off details		Song	Identity	Result
1	Chameleon	"Dove si balla" by Dargen D'Amico	undisclosed	SAFE
2	Sun & Moon	"Oh Marie" by Louis Prima	Cristiano Malgioglio	FINALIST

Performances on the seventh episode
#	Stage name	Song	Identity	Result
1	Snail	"Medley" by Renzo Arbore, Renato Rascel & Liza Minnelli	Giancarlo Magalli	FINALIST
1	Snail	"Medley" by Renzo Arbore, Renato Rascel & Liza Minnelli	Michela Magalli	FINALIST
2	Chick	"Medley" by Morgana Giovannetti, Raffaella Carrà, Renato Carosone & Liza Minnelli	undisclosed	WIN
3	Fox	"Sabato pomeriggio" by Claudio Baglioni	undisclosed	WIN
4	Chameleon	"Salirò" by Daniele Silvestri	Riccardo Rossi	THIRD
Sing-off details		Song	Identity	Result
1	Chick	"Il paradiso"/"La spada nel cuore" by Patty Pravo	Lino Banfi	RUNNERS-UP
1	Chick	"Il paradiso"/"La spada nel cuore" by Patty Pravo	Rosanna Banfi	RUNNERS-UP
2	Fox	"Pazza idea"/"Se perdo te" by Patty Pravo	Paolo Conticini	WINNER

== Season 4 (2023) ==
Stage name	Celebrity	Occupation	Episodes					
Stage name	Celebrity	Occupation	1	2	3	4	5	6
Cavaliere Veneziano (Venetian Knight)	Samuel Peron	Dancer	SAFE	SAFE	SAFE	RISK	RISK	WINNER
Ciuchino (Donkey)	Nino Frassica	Actor	SAFE	SAFE	IMM	SAFE	WIN	RUNNER-UP
Riccio (Hedgehog)	Massimo Lopez	Actor	SAFE	SAFE	SAFE	SAFE	WIN	THIRD
Criceto (Hamster)	Nathalie Guetta	Actress	WIN	WIN	WIN	WIN	WIN	FINALIST
Stella (Star)	Simona Ventura	TV Host	SAFE	RISK	SAFE	RISK	RISK	FINALIST
Squalo (Shark)	Tullio Solenghi	Actor	SAFE	IMM	SAFE	IMM	OUT	
Scoiattolo Nero (Black Squirrel)	Valeria Marini	Actress	SAFE	IMM	IMM	OUT		
Porcellino (Piggy)	Maurizio Ferrini	Actor	SAFE	SAFE	RISK	GOLD		
Ippopotamo (Hippo)	Mal	Singer	SAFE	SAFE	OUT			
Colombi (Doves)	Simona Izzo	Actress	SAFE	OUT				
Colombi (Doves)	Ricky Tognazzi	Actor	SAFE	OUT				
Rosa (Rose)	Valeria Fabrizi	Singer	RISK	GOLD				
Cigno (Swan)	Antonio Mezzancella	Singer	OUT					
Cigno (Swan)	Sandra Milo	Actress	OUT					

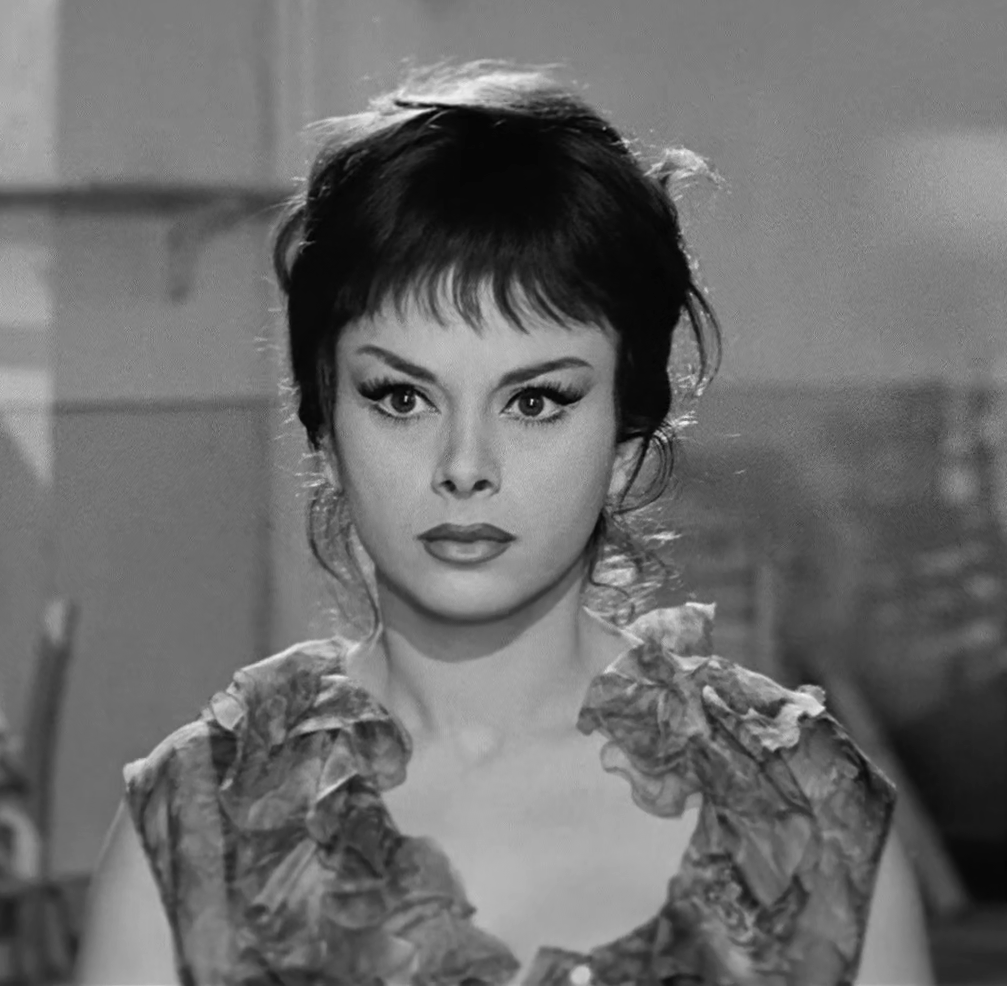
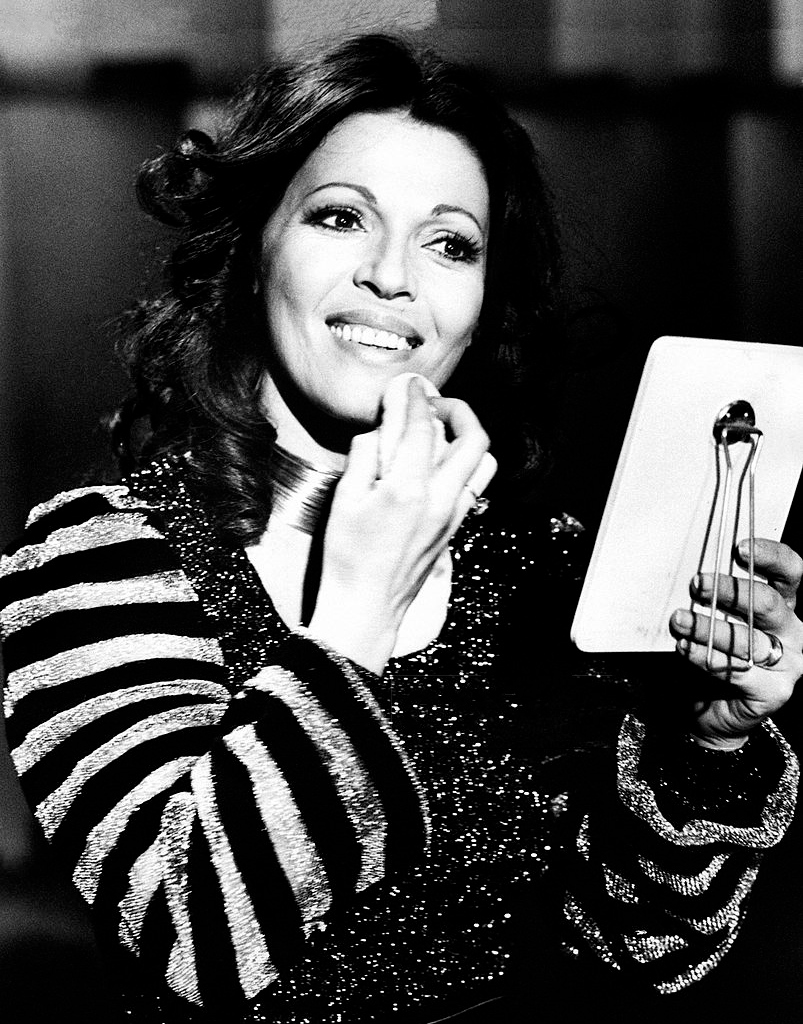
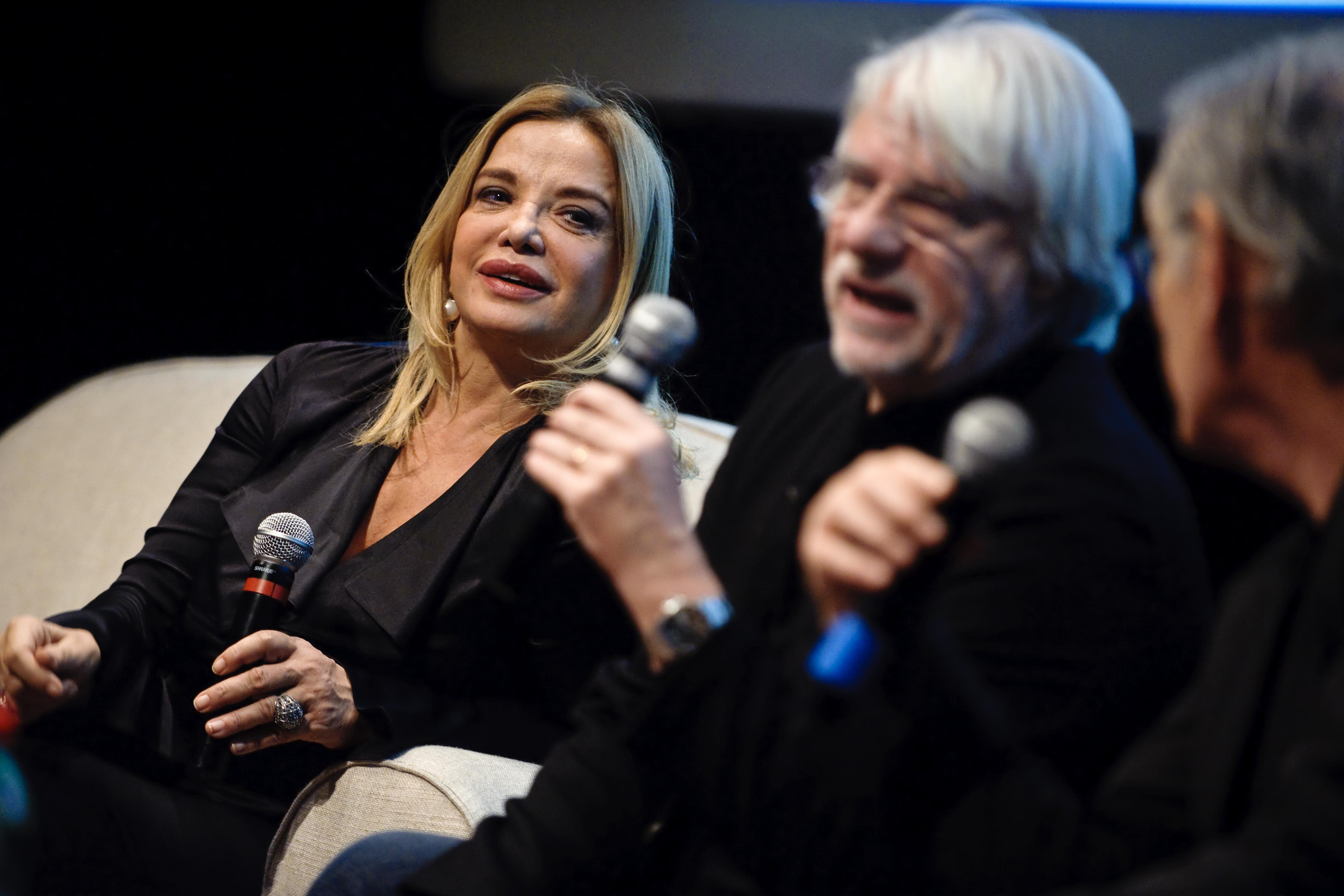
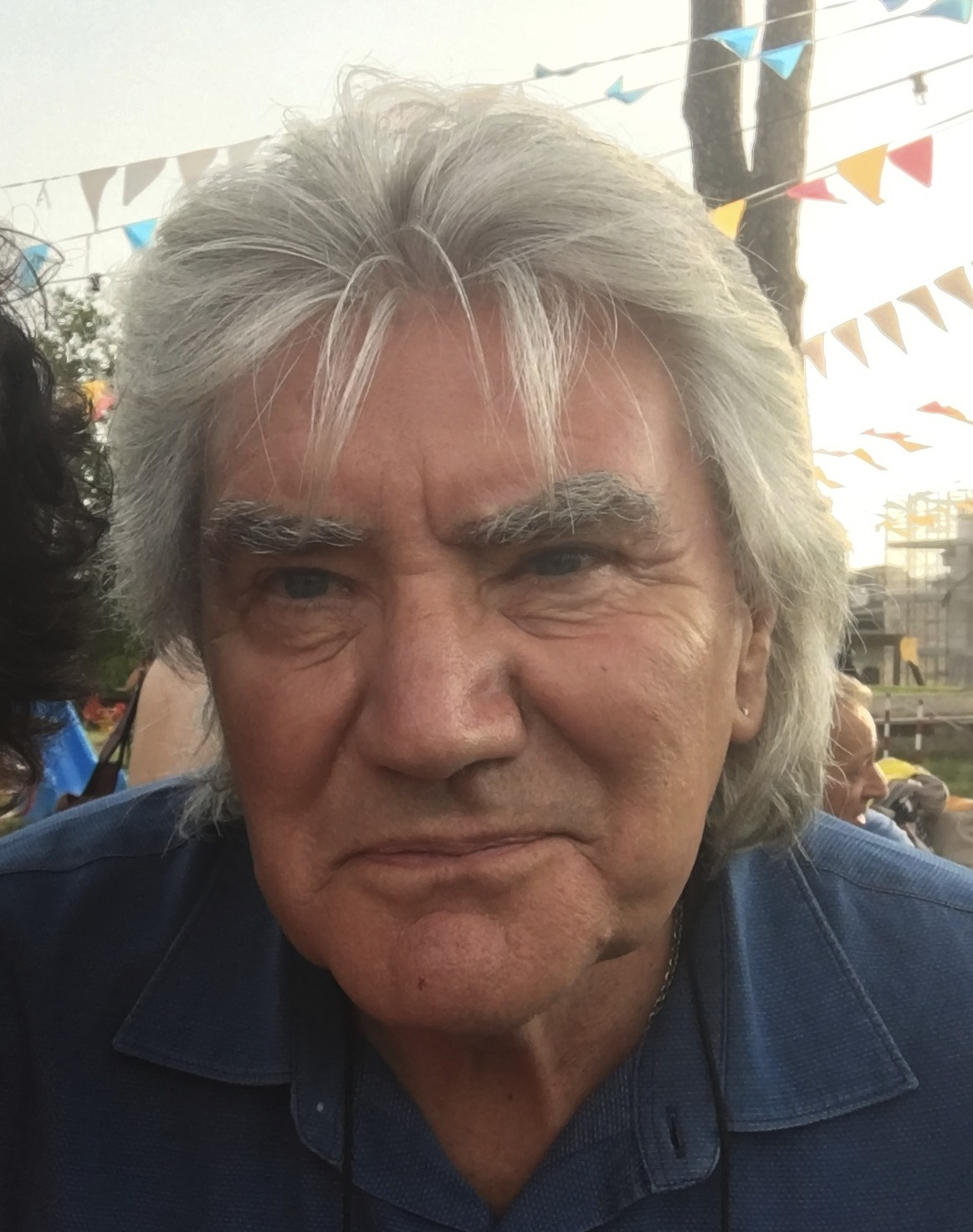
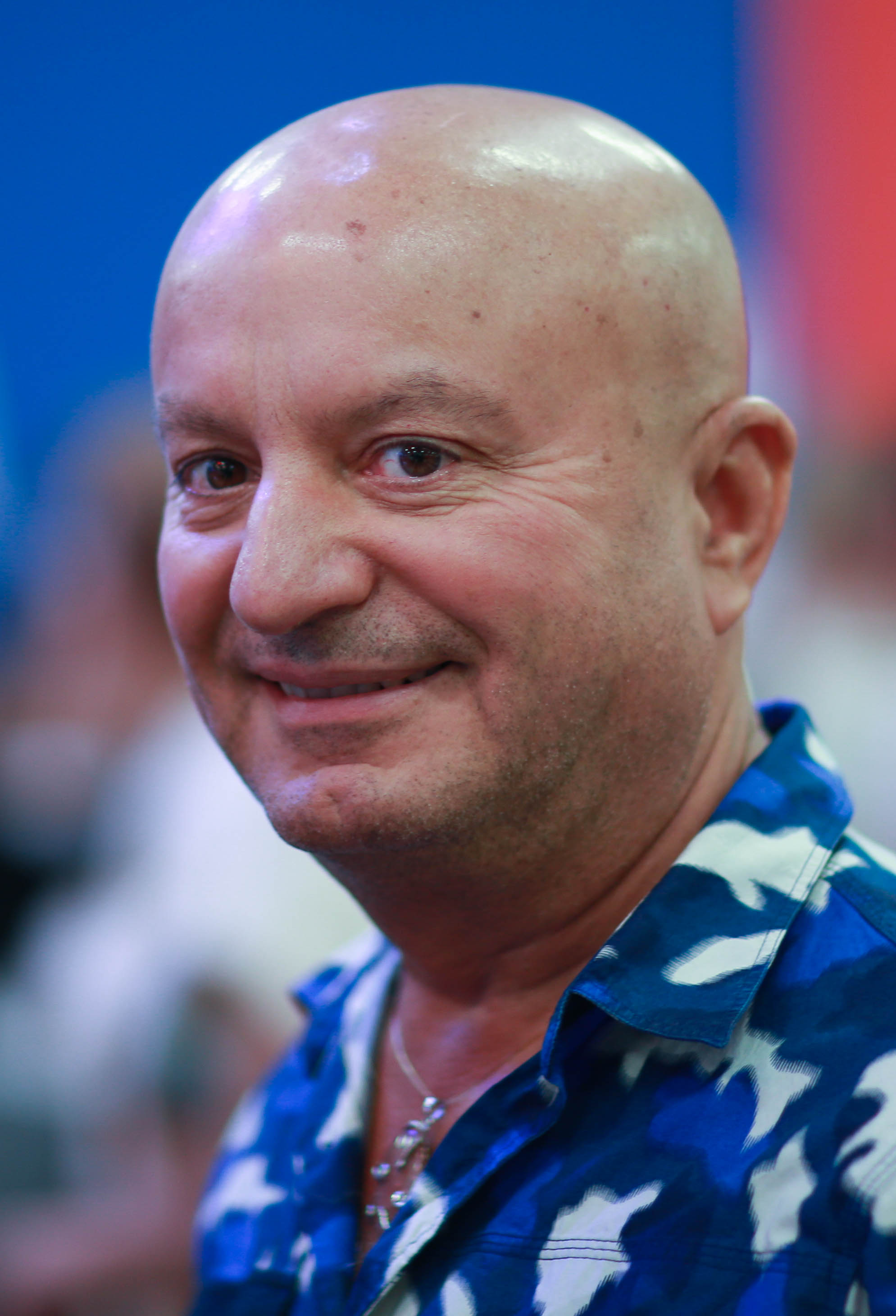
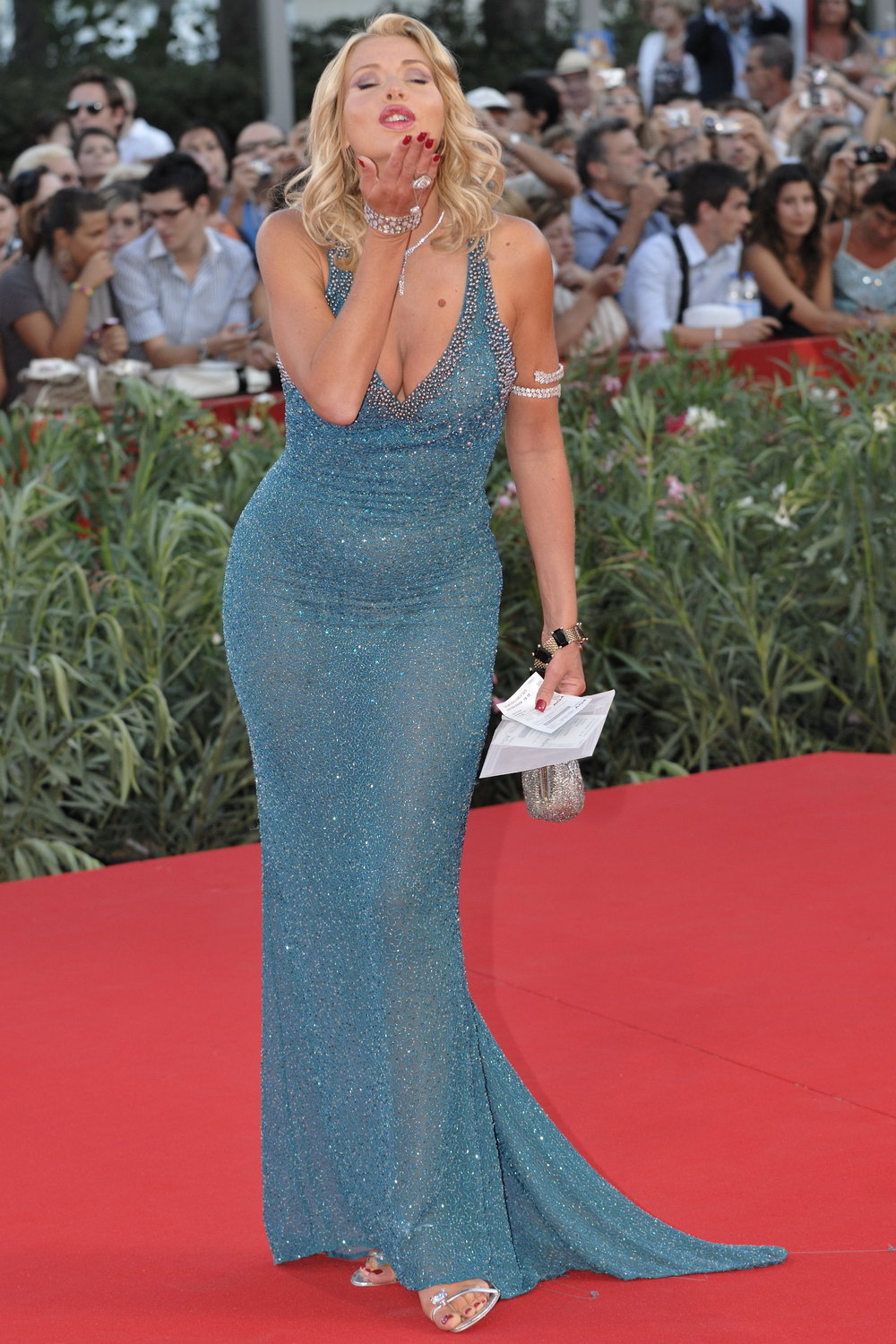
The celebrities who competed in the fourth season of Il cantante mascherato, pictured in order of elimination (l-r):

Sandra Milo ("Swan"), Valeria Fabrizi ("Rose"), Simona Izzo ("Doves"), Ricky Tognazzi ("Doves"), Mal ("Hippo"), Maurizio Ferrini ("Piggy"), Valeria Marini ("Black Squirrel"),

Not pictured: Antonio Mezzancella ("Swan")

=== Week 1 (19 March) ===
Performances on the first episode
#	Stage name	Song	Identity	Result
1	Hedgehog	"Erba Di Casa Mia" by Massimo Ranieri	undisclosed	SAFE
2	Hamster	"Tu vuò fà l'americano" by Renato Carosone	undisclosed	SAFE
3	Doves	"Fatti mandare dalla mamma" by Gianni Morandi	undisclosed	SAFE
3	Doves	"Fatti mandare dalla mamma" by Gianni Morandi	undisclosed	SAFE
4	Black Squirrel	"Chimica" by Ditonellapiaga	undisclosed	SAFE
5	Piggy	"Vincenzina e la fabbrica"/"Io e te"/"Mario"/ "Vengo anch'io, no tu no"/"El portava i scarp del tennis" by Enzo Jannacci	undisclosed	SAFE
6	Hippo	"Beggin'" by Måneskin	undisclosed	SAFE
7	Queen of Hearts	"Medley"	Stefania Sandrelli	GUEST
7	Queen of Hearts	"Medley"	Amanda Sandrelli	GUEST
8	Donkey	"Personalitá" by Caterina Valente	undisclosed	SAFE
9	Star	"Supereroi" by Mr. Rain	undisclosed	SAFE
10	Shark	"Vita spericolata" by Vasco Rossi	undisclosed	SAFE
11	Rose	"Via Con Me" by Paolo Conte	undisclosed	RISK
12	Venetian Knight	"Mentre tutto scorre" by Negramaro	undisclosed	SAFE
13	Swan	"La Bambola" by Patty Pravo/"Tristezza" by Ornella Vanoni	Antonio Mezzancella	OUT
13	Swan	"La Bambola" by Patty Pravo/"Tristezza" by Ornella Vanoni	Sandra Milo	OUT

=== Week 2 (25 March) ===
Performances on the second episode
#	Stage name	Song	Identity	Result
1	Doves	"Triangolo" by Renato Zero	Ricky Tognazzi	OUT
1	Doves	"Triangolo" by Renato Zero	Simona Izzo	OUT
2	Black Squirrel	"E la luna bussò" by Loredana Bertè	undisclosed	IMM
3	Hamster	"Dove sta Zazà" by Gabriella Ferri	undisclosed	SAFE
4	Hedgehog	"La voce del silenzio" by Massimo Ranieri	undisclosed	SAFE
5	Piggy	"Medley"	undisclosed	SAFE
6	Queen of Hearts	"Medley"	Al Bano	GUEST
6	Queen of Hearts	"Medley"	Jasmine Carrisi	GUEST
7	Donkey	"Nuntereggae più" by Rino Gaetano	undisclosed	SAFE
8	Shark	"Certe notti" by Luciano Ligabue	undisclosed	IMM
9	Venetian Knight	"Noi due nel mondo e nell'anima" by Pooh	undisclosed	SAFE
10	Star	"Made in Italy" by Rosa Chemical	undisclosed	RISK
11	Rose	"Ritornerai" by Bruno Lauzi	Valeria Fabrizi	GOLD MASK
12	Hippo	"Smells Like Teen Spirit" by Nirvana	undisclosed	SAFE

=== Week 3 (1 April) ===
Performances on the third episode
#	Stage name	Song	Identity	Result
1	Star	"Ciao Ciao" by La Rappresentante di Lista	undisclosed	SAFE
2	Shark	"L'emozione non ha voce" by Adriano Celentano	undisclosed	SAFE
3	Hamster	"Chella llà" by Renato Carosone	undisclosed	SAFE
4	Black Squirrel	"Furore" by Paola & Chiara	undisclosed	IMM
5	Queen of Hearts	"Medley"	Ricchi e Poveri	GUEST
6	Piggy	"Medley" by Cochi e Renato	undisclosed	RISK
7	Donkey	"Buonasera Signorina" by Fred Buscaglione	undisclosed	IMM
8	Venetian Knight	"Diavolo in me" by Zucchero	undisclosed	SAFE
9	Hedgehog	"Tango" by Tananai	undisclosed	SAFE
10	Hippo	"Medley" by Elvis Presley	Mal	OUT

=== Week 4 (8 April) ===
Performances on the fourth episode
#	Stage name	Song	Identity	Result
1	Venetian Knight	"X colpa di chi?" by Zucchero	undisclosed	RISK
2	Star	"Dove si balla" by Dargen D'Amico	undisclosed	RISK
3	Hamster	"'O Sarracino" by Renato Carosone	undisclosed	SAFE
4	Queen of Hearts	"Medley"	Gigi D'Alessio	GUEST
5	Hedgehog	"Pensieri e parole" by Lucio Battisti	undisclosed	SAFE
6	Piggy	"Medley" by Adriano Celentano	Maurizio Ferrini	GOLD MASK
7	Donkey	"Stasera mi butto" by Rocky Roberts	undisclosed	SAFE
8	Black Squirrel	"Mi vendo" by Renato Zero	undisclosed	RISK
9	Shark	"Una lunga storia d'amore" by Gino Paoli	undisclosed	IMM

== See also ==
- Masked Singer franchise
