= Caterina Balivo =

Italian television presenter and actress

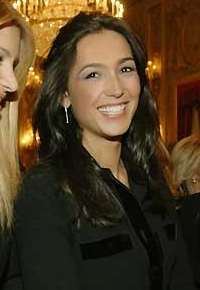
- Born: 22 February 1980 (age 45); Naples, Italy
- Occupations: Television presenter; model
- Years active: 1999 - present
- Spouse: Guido Maria Brera (m. 2014)
- Children: 2
- Website: www.caterinabalivo.com

Caterina Balivo (born 21 February 1980) is an Italian television presenter and model.

== Life and career ==
Born in Naples, Balivo grew up in Aversa, Province of Caserta. In 1999 she entered the main competition at Miss Italia and she eventually ranked third. Since 2000 she works with RAI as a television presenter. In 2003 she debuted as an actress, and she also appeared in fotoromanzi. Since 2012 Balivo is a freelance journalist.

== Personal life ==
In 2012 Balivo gave birth to her first child, a son, she had from the financial manager Guido Maria Brera. The couple were married on August 30, 2014, in a civil ceremony in Capri.

== Television ==
Year	Title	Role	Notes
1999	Miss Italia	Contestant	Annual beauty contest (3rd place)
1999–2000	Scommettiamo che…?	Co-host	Game show (season 7)
2000	Miss Italia	Reporter	Annual beauty contest
2003–2004	Casa Raiuno	Presenter	Variety show (seasons 2–3)
2003–2005	Unomattina	Co-host	Talk show (seasons 18–19)
2004	L'anno che verrà	Guest	New Year's Eve special
2005–2010	Festa italiana	Presenter	Talk show
2007	Nel nome del cuore	Presenter	Musical show (season 5)
2007	Stasera mi butto	Presenter	Talent show (season 4)
2008–2009	Dimmi la verità	Presenter	Game show
2008–2009	Miss Italia nel Mondo	Presenter	Annual beauty contest
2009	I sogni son desideri	Presenter	Reality show (season 4)
2010	Bravo Show	Presenter	Comedy/cabaret show
2010–2011	Pomeriggio sul 2	Presenter	Talk show
2012, 2019	Miss Italia	Judge	Annual beauty contest
2013–2018	Detto fatto	Presenter	Variety/tutorial show (seasons 1–6)
2013	Concerto di Natale	Presenter	Special
2014	Il più grande pasticcere	Presenter	Cooking show (season 1)
2015	Monte Bianco - Sfida verticale	Presenter	Reality show
2018–2020	Vieni da me	Presenter	Talk show
2021–present	Il cantante mascherato	Judge	Talent show (seasons 2–present)
2022–present	Help ho un dubbio	Presenter	Talent/reality show
