= Pino Massara =

Italian musician, composer, record producer and conductor

Pino Massara (24 April 1931 – 23 July 2013) was an Italian musician, composer, record producer and conductor.

Born in Vigevano as Giuseppe Previde Massara, graduated in chemistry, from the university years he devoted himself to jazz music. Among his successful songs "Permette, signorina?", originally performed by Nicola Arigliano and later covered by Nat King Cole with the title "Cappuccina", "I Sing ammore" and "Grazie prego scusi", both recorded by several artists including Dean Martin, "Nel Sole", which sold over one million copies and launched the career of Al Bano, and "Siamo la coppia più bella del mondo", a duet between Adriano Celentano and Claudia Mori which was number one at the Italian hit parade for six weeks. In the seventies Massara founded "Bla Bla Records", an alternative recording company that produced the first works of Franco Battiato, Juri Camisasca and the avant-garde rock band Capsicum Red.
