= Nel sole =

Single by Al Bano

from the album Nel sole
- B-side: "Pensieri "P" 33"
- Released: March 1967
- Genre: Pop
- Length: 3:50
- Label: La voce del padrone
- Songwriter(s): Al Bano, Pino Massara and Vito Pallavicini

Al Bano singles chronology
"Io di notte" (1966)	"Nel sole" (1967)	"L'oro del mondo" (1967)

"Nel sole" is a song composed by Al Bano, Pino Massara and Vito Pallavicini, and performed by Al Bano. The song marked his first commercial success, and launched his career as a singer. The single peaked at first place four weeks on the Italian hit parade and sold about one million and half copies. The song gave its name to a film, Nel sole, directed by Aldo Grimaldi and starring the same Al Bano and his then-wife Romina Power.

== Track listing ==
- 7" single – MQ 2085
1. "Nel Sole" (Albano Carrisi, Pino Massara, Vito Pallavicini) – 3:50
2. "Pensieri "P" 33" (Luciano Beretta, Monegasco, Rossella Conz) – 3:01
