= Figli delle stelle (song) =

Single by Alan Sorrenti

from the album Figli delle stelle
- B-side: "E tu mi porti via"
- Released: 24 November 1977
- Genre: Disco, pop
- Label: EMI
- Songwriter(s): Alan Sorrenti

Alan Sorrenti singles chronology
"Sienteme" (1976)	"Figli delle stelle" (1977)	"Donna luna" (1978)

Music video
- "Figli delle stelle" on YouTube

"Figli delle stelle" (transl. "Children of the stars") is a 1977 song written and performed by Alan Sorrenti.

== Background ==
The song was initially composed with the title "Heaven". It marked a turning point in Sorrenti's career, who had previously released critically acclaimed but commercially disappointing progressive and experimental rock albums characterized by hermetic and metaphor-rich lyrics. With this song and the eponymous album he embraced pop and disco music as well as romantic and simply constructed lyrics, and while he had a massive commercial success he also faced harsh reviews from critics. Artists who covered the song include Gianni Morandi, Claudio Baglioni, Irene Grandi and Mario Venuti.

== Track listing ==
- 7" single - EMI – 3C 006-18307
1. "Figli delle stelle" (Alan Sorrenti) - 4:33
2. "E tu mi porti via" (Alan Sorrenti) - 3:50

== Charts ==
Chart	Peak position
Italy (Musica e dischi)	1

== Certifications ==
Region	Certification	Certified units/sales
Italy (FIMI) certification for digital sales and streaming since January 2009	Platinum	100,000^{‡}
^{‡} Sales+streaming figures based on certification alone.
