= Thalía discography =

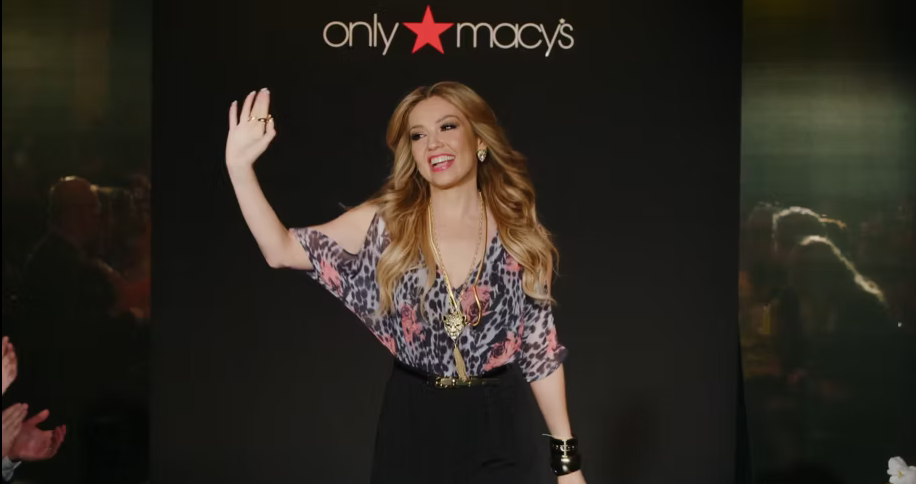
- Thalía promoting her Macy's brand in 2015
- Studio albums: 21
- Extended plays: 3
- Live albums: 2
- Compilation albums: 5
- Singles: 77
- Video albums: 6
- Music videos: 106
- Limited releases: 13

The discography of Mexican recording artist Thalía, consists of 20 studio albums, 5 compilation albums, 13 limited releases, two live albums and 70 singles. She has also sung in Portuguese, French and Tagalog, apart from Spanish and English, in order to promote her music in other music markets. Thalía's popularity was further enhanced by her telenovelas, that were broadcast in over 180 countries, giving her the chance to create a solid fan base in many countries and gain stardom mainly by Spanish recording records. According to Time magazine in 2001, her records have been sold in markets that Latin stars don't normally sell such as China, Yemen, and the Philippines.

Her self-titled debut album Thalía, was released in 1990 by Fonovisa Records. With the same label she released two more albums; Mundo De Cristal in 1991 and Love in 1992, both attained commercial success in Mexico, while the lattermost became her best-selling album under Fonovisa with estimated copies at 500,000 in Mexico alone. In 1994, she signed a recording contract with EMI Music and released her fourth studio album En Éxtasis the following year. It was launched in over 25 countries. In 1997, she released her next studio album Amor A La Mexicana (1997), and her first multilingual and first compilation album named Nandito Ako, which became a success in the Philippines.

During the 2000s, she released more albums, including US Latin multi-platinum records Arrasando in 2000, Thalía in 2002 and El Sexto Sentido in 2005 and also attained multiple music certifications around the world. In 2008, she released her tenth studio album, Lunada, which was considered to be her lowest-selling album at that time with 250,000 copies sold worldwide. However, she regained her commercial performance in 2009 when she joined Sony Music and released her first live album, Primera Fila, selling between 1 to 1.5 million copies worldwide. As of 2013, it remained in the Mexican charts for over 170 weeks, according to AMPROFON, and spent 55 non-consecutive weeks at the top of the chart. During the 2010s, Thalía released more albums, including Habítame Siempre (2012), Amore Mío (2014), Latina (2016), and Valiente (2018). All of them reached gold or platinum status in Mexico.

She has four number one in the Billboard Hot Latin Tracks and is among the female artists with most number one in that chart. Her biggest singles includes "Piel Morena", "Amor A La Mexicana", "Entre El Mar Y Una Estrella", "Arrasando", "Tú Y Yo", "No Me Enseñaste", "Cerca De Ti", "Desde Esa Noche" and "No Me Acuerdo". "No Me Acuerdo" became one of the highest-certified Latin singles in the United States with 14× Platinum (Latin).

In 2006, she received an award by her then record company EMI, for sales of more than 10 million copies with all her discography with the company (total of 15 million by 2005). By 2008, she sold 1,374,000 in the United States, according to Nielsen SoundScan. Thalía has sold over 25 million records worldwide, being considered one of the best-selling Latin musicians of all time. She is also the biggest selling female Mexican soloist in Brazil and have at least one album among the best selling of all-time in Mexico, and the Philippines.

== Albums ==
=== Studio albums ===
Title	Album details	Peak chart positions										Certifications	Sales
Title	Album details	MEX	CZE	GRE (Intern.)	HUN	JAP	SPA	SWI	US	US Latin	US Latin Pop	Certifications	Sales
Thalía	Released: October 10, 1990; Label: Melody/Fonovisa; Formats: CD, cassette, LP	—	—	—	—	—	—	—	—	—	—	MEX: 2× Gold	MEX: 200,000
Mundo de Cristal	Released: September 26, 1991; Label: Melody/Fonovisa; Formats: CD, cassette, LP	—	—	—	—	—	—	—	—	—	—	MEX: 2× Gold	MEX: 200,000
Love	Released: October 7, 1992; Label: Melody/Fonovisa; Formats: CD, cassette, LP	—	—	—	—	—	—	—	—	—	15	MEX: Platinum + Gold	MEX: 500,000
En Éxtasis	Released: October 1, 1995; Label: EMI; Formats: CD, cassette, LP	—	—	5	7	—	—	—	—	13	7	US: 2× Platinum (Latin)	World: 2,000,000; MEX: 500,000; US: 300,000
Amor a la Mexicana	Released: July 1, 1997; Label: EMI; Formats: CD, cassette	—	—	3	4	—	22	—	—	6	2	GRE: Gold; MEX: Gold; SPA: 2× Platinum; US: 2× Platinum (Latin)	World: 2,000,000; MEX: 140,000 (Note: Mexican sales for Amor a la Mexicana as of November 1997.); SPA: 300,000
Arrasando	Released: April 25, 2000; Label: EMI; Formats: CD, cassette	—	—	1	5	—	3	41	—	4	1	GRE: Gold; HUN: Platinum; US: 2× Platinum (Latin); MEX: Platinum; SPA: 4× Platinum	World: 2,000,000; MEX: 250,000; US: 240,000
Thalía	Released: May 21, 2002; Label: EMI; Format: CD	1	9	1	—	—	22	30	126	1	1	MEX: Gold; SPA: Gold; US: 2× Platinum (Latin)	MEX: 170,000; US: 200,000
Thalía (English)	Released: July 8, 2003; Label: EMI/Virgin; Formats: CD, digital download	—	27	3	—	10	—	—	11	—	—	MEX: Gold; JAP: Gold	World: 750,000; MEX: 70,000 (Note: Mexican sales for Thalía (English album) as of August 2003.); JAP: 200,000; US: 196,000
El Sexto Sentido	Released: July 19, 2005; Label: EMI; Formats: CD, digital download	2	—	5	—	63	41	—	63	3	2	US: 2× Platinum (Latin); MEX: Gold	JAP: 6,702
Lunada	Released: June 24, 2008; Label: EMI, Televisa Music; Formats: CD, digital download	8	—	17	—	—	—	—	—	10	4		US: 14,000
Habítame Siempre	Released: November 19, 2012; Label: Sony Music Latin; Formats: CD, digital download	1	—	—	—	—	26	—	153	1	1	MEX: 4× Platinum+Gold; US: Gold (Latin)	World: 500,000
Viva Kids Vol. 1	Released: March 25, 2014; Label: Sony Music Latin; Formats: CD, digital download	1	—	—	—	—	—	—	—	—	—		
Amore Mío	Released: November 4, 2014; Label: Sony Music Latin; Formats: CD, digital download	1	—	—	—	—	55	—	173	1	1	MEX: Platinum	
Latina	Released: May 6, 2016; Label: Sony Music Latin; Formats: CD, digital download	4	—	53	—	—	17	—	—	1	1	MEX: Platinum; US: Platinum (Latin)	
Valiente	Released: November 9, 2018; Label: Sony Music Latin; Formats: CD, digital download	2	—	—	—	—	20	—	—	7	1	MEX: Platinum; US: 2× Platinum (Latin)	
Viva Kids Vol. 2	Released: May 29, 2020; Label: Sony Music Latin; Formats: CD, digital download	—	—	—	—	—	—	—	—	—	—		
Desamorfosis	Released: May 14, 2021; Label: Sony Music Latin; Formats: CD, digital download	—	—	—	—	—	—	—	—	—	—		
Thalía's Mixtape	Released: May 28, 2023; Label: Sony Music Latin; Formats: CD, digital download	—	—	—	—	—	—	—	—	—	—		
A Mucha Honra	Released: April 26, 2024; Label: Sony Music Latin; Formats: CD, digital download	—	—	—	—	—	—	—	—	—	—		
Navidad Melancólica	Released: November 1, 2024; Label: Sony Music Latin; Formats: Vinyl, digital download	—	—	—	—	—	—	—	—	—	—		
Todo Suena Mejor en Cumbia	Released: April 17, 2026; Label: Sony Music Latin; Formats: Vinyl, digital download	—	—	—	—	—	—	—	—	—	—		
"—" denotes items that did not chart or were not released.

=== Live albums ===
Title	Album details	Peak chart positions						Certifications	Sales
Title	Album details	MEX	GRE	SPA	US	US Latin	US Latin Pop	Certifications	Sales
Primera Fila	Released: December 1, 2009; Label: Sony Music Latin; Formats: CD, DVD, digital download	1	6	32	198	4	2	MEX: 2× Diamond + Platinum	World: 1,000,000; US: 96,000
Viva Tour (En Vivo)	Released: November 12, 2013; Label: Sony Music Latin; Formats: CD, DVD, digital download	5	—	—	—	—	—	MEX: Gold	MEX: 30,000
"—" denotes items that did not chart or were not released.

=== Compilation albums ===
Title	Album details	Peak chart positions						Certifications
Title	Album details	GRE (Intern.)	HUN	SPA	US	LATIN	LATIN POP	Certifications
Nandito Ako	Released: January 28, 1997; Label: EMI Philippines; Formats: CD, cassette	—	—	—	—	—	—	
Con Banda: Grandes Éxitos	Released: August 28, 2001; Label: EMI; Formats: CD, cassette	1	17	7	167	2	—	MEX: Gold; SPA: Gold; US: Platinum (Latin)
Thalía's Hits Remixed	Released: February 25, 2003; Label: EMI; Format: CD	25	—	99	—	7	4	US: Platinum (Latin)
Greatest Hits	Released: February 10, 2004; Label: EMI; Formats: CD, DVD	8	—	37	128	2	1	MEX: Gold
Thalía	Released: December 24, 2013; Label: Sony Music Brasil; Format: CD	—	—	—	—	—	—	

==== Limited releases ====
Title	EP details
Los Deseos De Thalia (Grandes Exitos)	Released: 1994; Label: Melody; Formats: CD, cassette
20 Kilates Musicales	Released: 1996; Label: FonoVisa; Formats: CD, cassette
Bailando En Éxtasis	Released: 1997; Label: EMI; Formats: CD
Jugo De Exitos	Released: 1998; Label: Universal Music; Formats: CD, cassette
Mis Mejores Momentos	Released: 1998; Label: Universal Music; Formats: CD
Serie Millennium 21	Released: 1999; Label: Universal Music; Formats: CD
La Sensación de Thalia	Released: 2000; Label: Universal Music; Formats: CD
Serie 32	Released: October 30, 2001; Label: Universal Music; Formats: CD
15 Exitos	Released: April 2, 2002; Label: Universal Music; Formats: CD
Ediciónlimitada	Released: August 6, 2002; Label: Universal Music; Formats: CD
Esenciales: The Ultimate Collection	Released: November 26, 2002; Label: Universal Music; Formats: CD
Oro: Grandes Éxitos	Released: October 6, 2004; Label: Universal Music; Formats: CD
El comienzo de la Historia	Released: May 5, 2009; Label: Universal Music; Formats: CD

== Extended plays ==
List of extended plays
Title	Details
Mix	Released: 1993; Label: Melody; Format: CD, Cassette
El Sexto Sentido (Re+Loaded)	Released: 2006; Label: EMI; Format: digital download

== Singles ==
=== As lead artist ===
==== 1990s ====
List of singles as lead artist in the 1990s decade, showing year released, selected chart positions, certifications, and originating album (Note: Thalía's singles prior to 1995 do not have enough database available regarding their chart performance.)
Title	Year	Peak chart positions								Certifications	Album
Title	Year	MEX	BEL	FRA	ITA	ROM	SPA	US Latin	US Latin Pop	Certifications	Album
"Un Pacto entre Los Dos"	1990	16	—	—	—	—	—	—	—		Thalía (1990)
"Saliva"	1990	—	—	—	—	—	—	—	—	PROMUSICAE: Gold	Thalía (1990)
"Pienso en Ti"	1990	11	—	—	—	—	—	—	—		Thalía (1990)
"Amarillo Azul"	1991	—	—	—	—	—	—	—	—		Thalía (1990)
"Sudor"	1991	9	—	—	—	—	—	—	—		Mundo de Cristal
"En La Intimidad"	1991	—	—	—	—	—	—	—	—		Mundo de Cristal
"Fuego Cruzado"	1992	12	—	—	—	—	—	—	—		Mundo de Cristal
"Te Necesito"	1992	—	—	—	—	—	—	—	—		Mundo de Cristal
"Sangre"	1992	2	—	—	—	—	—	—	—		Love
"Maria Mercedes"	1992	11	—	—	—	—	—	—	—		Love
"Love"	1993	5	—	—	—	—	—	—	—		Love
"La Vie en Rose"	1993	—	—	—	—	—	—	—	—		Love
"Marimar"	1994	—	—	—	—	—	—	—	—		Non-album single
"Piel Morena"	1995	—	—	—	—	—	—	7	4		En Éxtasis
"Amándote"	1995	—	—	—	—	—	—	—	—		En Éxtasis
"María La del Barrio"	1995	—	—	—	—	—	—	30	14		En Éxtasis
"Quiero Hacerte el Amor"	1996	—	—	—	—	—	—	—	—		En Éxtasis
"Gracias a Dios"	1996	—	—	—	—	—	—	26	8		En Éxtasis
"Nandito Ako"	1997	—	—	—	—	—	—	—	—		Nandito Ako
"Amor a La Mexicana"	1997	—	9	11	17	—	2	6	—	SNEP: Gold	Amor a La Mexicana
"Viaje Tiempo Atrás"	1997	—	—	—	—	—	—	—	—		Anastasia
"Por Amor"	1997	—	—	—	—	55	—	—	—		Amor a La Mexicana
"Mujer Latina"	1997	—	—	—	—	—	13	—	—		Amor a La Mexicana
"Noches sin Luna"	1998	—	—	—	—	—	—	—	—		Amor a La Mexicana
"Ponle Remedio"	1998	—	—	—	—	—	—	—	—		Amor a La Mexicana
"Es Tu Amor"	1998	—	—	—	—	—	—	—	—		Amor a La Mexicana
"De Dónde Soy"	1998	—	—	—	—	—	—	—	—		Amor a La Mexicana
"—" denotes a recording that did not chart or was not released in that territory.

==== 2000s ====
List of singles as lead artist in the 2000s decade, showing year released, selected chart positions, certifications, and originating album
Title	Year	Peak chart positions										Sales	Certifications	Album
Title	Year	MEX	AUS	GER	GRE	NZ	SPA	SWI	US	US Latin	US Latin Pop	Sales	Certifications	Album
"Entre el mar y una estrella"	2000	—	—	—	1	—	5	—	— (Note: "Entre el mar y una estrella" did not enter the Billboard Hot 100, but peaked at number two on the Bubbling Under Hot 100 singles chart.)	1	1			Arrasando
"Regresa a Mí"	2000	—	—	—	—	—	—	—	—	19	12			Arrasando
"Arrasando" / "It's My Party"	2000	3	—	—	7	—	—	—	—	—	5			Arrasando
"Menta y Canela" (Note: Limited Brazilian release.)	2000	—	—	—	—	—	—	—	—	—	—			Arrasando
"Rosalinda"	2000	—	—	—	—	—	—	—	—	46	23			Arrasando
"Reencarnación"	2000	—	—	—	—	—	—	—	—	30	17			Arrasando
"Arrasando (Banda Version)"	2000	—	—	—	—	—	—	—	—	—	—			Thalía con Banda: Grandes Éxitos
"Amor a La Mexicana (Banda Version)"	2001	—	—	—	—	—	—	—	—	—	—			Thalía con Banda: Grandes Éxitos
"Piel Morena (Banda Version)"	2001	—	—	—	—	—	—	—	—	—	—			Thalía con Banda: Grandes Éxitos
"La Revancha"	2001	—	—	—	—	—	—	—	—	—	—			Thalía con Banda: Grandes Éxitos
"Tú y Yo" (solo or remix featuring Kumbia Kings)	2002	1	—	—	31	—	17	63	— (Note: "Tú y Yo" did not enter the Billboard Hot 100, but peaked at number seven on the Bubbling Under Hot 100 singles chart.)	1	4	US: 200,000 (Note: Sales figures for "Tú y Yo" in the United States as of August 2002.)		Thalía (2002)
"No Me Enseñaste"	2002	—	—	—	—	—	—	—	— (Note: "No Me Enseñaste" did not enter the Billboard Hot 100, but peaked at number 14 on the Bubbling Under Hot 100 singles chart.)	1	3			Thalía (2002)
"¿A Quién Le Importa?"	2002	14	—	—	—	—	—	—	—	9	6			Thalía (2002)
"Dance, Dance (The Mexican)"	2002	—	—	—	10	—	—	—	—	—	—			Thalía (2002)
"I Want You" / "Me Pones Sexy" (featuring Fat Joe)	2003	—	25	86	25	38	—	64	22	9	9			Thalía (2003)
"Baby, I'm in Love" / "Alguien Real"	2003	—	—	—	45	—	20	—	—	—	—			Thalía (2003)
"Closer to You" / "Cerca de Ti"	2003	5	—	—	—	—	—	—	— (Note: "Closer to You" did not enter the Billboard Hot 100, but peaked at number 4 on the Bubbling Under Hot 100 singles chart.)	1	3			Thalía (2003)
"Don't Look Back"	2004	—	—	—	—	—	—	—	—	—	—			Thalía (2003)
"Acción y Reacción"	2004	—	—	—	—	—	—	—	—	—	—			Greatest Hits
"Amar Sin Ser Amada" / "You Know He Never Loved You"	2005	—	—	—	—	—	—	—	— (Note: "You Know He Never Loved You" did not enter the Billboard Hot 100, but peaked at number 17 on the Bubbling Under Hot 100 singles chart.)	2	7			El Sexto Sentido
"Un Alma Sentenciada"	2005	—	—	—	—	—	—	—	—	13	11			El Sexto Sentido
"Seducción"	2006	—	—	—	—	—	—	—	—	32	14			El Sexto Sentido
"Cantando Por Un Sueño" (Note: Limited Mexican release.)	2006	—	—	—	—	—	—	—	—	—	—			El Sexto Sentido (Re+Loaded)
"Olvídame" (Note: Limited Mexican and Argentine release.)	2006	—	—	—	—	—	—	—	—	—	—			El Sexto Sentido
"No, No, No" (featuring Romeo Santos)	2006	—	—	—	—	—	—	—	— (Note: "No, No, No" did not enter the Billboard Hot 100, but peaked at number 15 on the Bubbling Under Hot 100 singles chart.)	4	4			El Sexto Sentido (Re+Loaded)
"Ten Paciencia"	2008	—	—	—	—	—	—	—	—	39	24			Lunada
"Equivocada"	2009	1	—	—	—	—	—	—	—	8	2		AMPROFON: Gold	Primera Fila
"—" denotes a recording that did not chart or was not released in that territory.

==== 2010s ====
List of singles as lead artist in the 2010s decade, showing year released, selected chart positions, certifications, and originating album
Title	Year	Peak chart positions										Certifications	Album
Title	Year	MEX	ARG	BOL	CHI	DR	ECU	SPA	URU	US Latin	US Latin Pop	Certifications	Album
"Qué Será de Ti"	2010	2	—	—	—	—	—	—	—	35	15	AMPROFON: Platinum	Primera Fila
"Estoy Enamorado" (with Pedro Capó)	2010	1	—	—	—	—	—	—	—	28	6	AMPROFON: Platinum	Primera Fila
"Enséñame A Vivir"	2010	—	—	—	—	—	—	—	—	—	—		Primera Fila
"El Próximo Viernes"	2011	—	—	—	—	—	—	—	—	—	—	AMPROFON: Platinum	Primera Fila
"Manías"	2012	1	—	—	—	—	—	—	—	26	14	AMPROFON: Platinum	Habítame Siempre
"Te Perdiste Mi Amor" (featuring Prince Royce)	2013	4	—	—	—	—	—	—	—	4	3	AMPROFON: 3× Platinum+Gold	Habítame Siempre
"La Apuesta" (featuring Erik Rubin)	2013	11	—	—	—	—	—	—	—	—	—	AMPROFON: Gold	Habítame Siempre
"Estou Apaixonado" (featuring Daniel)	2014	—	—	—	—	—	—	—	—	—	—		Thalía (2013)
"Vamos a Jugar"	2014	—	—	—	—	—	—	—	—	—	—		Viva Kids, Vol. 1
"Por Lo Que Reste de Vida"	2014	9	—	—	—	— (Note: "Por Lo Que Reste de Vida" did not enter the Dominican Airplay chart, but peaked at number three on the Dominican Pop Airplay chart.)	—	—	—	50	19		Amore Mío
"Como Tú No Hay Dos" (featuring Becky G)	2015	—	—	—	—	—	—	—	—	—	20		Amore Mío
"Amore Mio"	2015	6	—	—	—	—	—	—	—	—	—		Amore Mío
"Sólo Parecía Amor"	2015	28	—	—	—	—	—	—	—	—	—		Amore Mío
"Desde Esa Noche" (featuring Maluma)	2016	20	4	— (Note: "Desde Esa Noche" did not enter the Bolivian Airplay chart, but peaked at number 41 on the Monitor Latino#Bolivian Year-End Airplay chart.)	2	— (Note: "Desde Esa Noche" did not enter the Dominican Airplay chart, but peaked at number three on the Dominican Pop Airplay chart.)	1	22	4	16	4	AMPROFON: Diamond+2× Platinum+Gold; PMB: Platinum; PROMUSICAE: Platinum; RIAA: 2× Platinum (Latin)	Latina
"Vuélveme a Querer"	2016	40	—	—	—	—	— (Note: "Vuélveme a Querer" did not enter the Ecuadorian Airplay chart, but peaked at number 15 on the Ecuadorian Pop Airplay chart.)	—	—	—	20 (Note: "Vuelveme A Querer" peaked at number 20 on the Billboard Latin Pop Charts.)	AMPROFON: Gold	Latina
"Todavía Te Quiero" (featuring De La Ghetto)	2016	—	—	—	—	—	—	—	—	—	32 (Note: "Todavia Te Quiero" peaked at number 32 on the Billboard Latin Pop Charts.)		Latina
"Junto a Ti" (with Sasha, Benny y Erik)	2017	—	—	—	—	—	—	—	—	—	—		Non-album single
"No Me Acuerdo" (with Natti Natasha)	2018	1	2	1	1	7	1	5	1	14	8	AMPROFON: Diamond+Gold; PMB: Gold; PROMUSICAE: 3× Platinum; RIAA: 14× Platinum (Latin)	Valiente
"Me Oyen, Me Escuchan	2018	— (Note: "Me Oyen, Me Escuchan" did not enter the Billboard Mexico Airplay chart, but peaked at number 31 on the Billboard Mexico Pop Espanol Airplay chart.)	—	—	—	—	—	— (Note: "Me Oyen, Me Escuchan" did not enter the Spanish Top 100 chart, but peaked at number 26 on the Spain Physical/Digital chart)	—	—	—		Valiente
"Lento" (with Gente de Zona)	2018	15	—	10	18	—	—	88	—	—	30		Valiente
"Lindo Pero Bruto" (with Lali)	2019	— (Note: "Lindo Pero Bruto" did not enter the Billboard Mexico Airplay chart, but peaked at number 14 on the Billboard Mexico Pop Espanol Airplay chart.)	21	10	—	—	64	—	—	—	32	AMPROFON: Platinum; RIAA: Gold (Latin)	Valiente
"Qué Ironía" (with Carlos Rivera)	2019	—	—	—	—	—	—	—	—	—	—		Valiente
"Ahí" (with Ana Mena)	2019	—	—	—	—	—	—	—	—	—	—		Valiente
"Vikingo"	2019	—	—	—	—	—	—	—	—	—	—		Valiente
"—" denotes a recording that did not chart or was not released in that territory.

==== 2020s ====
List of singles as lead artist in the 2020s decade, showing year released, selected chart positions, certifications, and originating album
Title	Year	Peak chart positions										Certifications	Album
Title	Year	MEX	BOL	CHI	DR	GUA	HON	PER	PR	US Latin Pop	VEN	Certifications	Album
"Ya Tú Me Conoces" (with Mau y Ricky)	2020	34	12	19	— (Note: "Ya Tú Me Conoces" did not enter the Dominican Airplay chart, but peaked at number four on the Dominican Pop Airplay chart.)	—	— (Note: "Ya Tú Me Conoces" did not enter the Honduras Airplay chart, but peaked at number four on the Honduras Pop Airplay chart.)	—	— (Note: "Ya Tú Me Conoces" did not enter the Puerto Rico chart, but peaked at number 12 on the Puerto Rico Pop chart.)	30	16		Desamorfosis
"Lo Siento Mucho" (with Río Roma)	2020	4	— (Note: "Lo Siento Mucho" did not enter the Bolivia Airplay chart, but peaked at number 18 on the Bolivia Latino Airplay chart.)	—	—	—	—	—	—	— (Note: "Lo Siento Mucho" did not enter the Billboard Latin Pop Songs, but peaked at number 10 on the Latin Pop Digital Song Sales chart.)	—	AMPROFON: Gold	Rojo
"Tímida" (with Pabllo Vittar)	2020	—	—	9	—	—	—	—	—	— (Note: "Tímida" did not enter the Billboard Latin Pop Songs, but peaked at number 13 on the Latin Pop Digital Song Sales chart.)	—	PMB: Platinum	111
"Mi No Cumpleaños"	2020	—	—	—	—	—	—	—	—	—	—		Viva Kids, Vol. 2
"Estoy Soltera" (with Leslie Shaw and Farina)	2020	11	— (Note: "Estoy Soltera" did not enter the Bolivia Airplay chart, but peaked at number 16 on the Bolivia Latino Airplay chart.)	—	—	—	— (Note: "Estoy Soltera" did not enter the Honduras Airplay chart, but peaked at number five on the Honduras Pop Airplay chart.)	2	—	— (Note: "Estoy Soltera" did not enter the Billboard Latin Pop Songs, but peaked at number 11 on the Latin Pop Digital Song Sales chart.)	— (Note: "Estoy Soltera" did not enter the Venezuela Airplay chart, but peaked at number 12 on the Venezuela Pop Airplay chart.)		Yo Soy Leslie Shaw
"La Luz" (with Myke Towers)	2020	— (Note: "La Luz" did not enter the Billboard Mexico Airplay chart, but peaked at number 16 on the Billboard Mexico Pop Espanol Airplay chart.)	—	— (Note: "La Luz" did not enter the Chile Airplay chart, but peaked at number 19 on the Chile Pop Airplay chart.)	— (Note: "La Luz" did not enter the Dominican Airplay chart, but peaked at number 16 on the Dominican Pop Airplay chart.)	—	—	—	— (Note: "La Luz" did not enter the Puerto Rico chart, but peaked at number 7 on the Puerto Rico Pop chart.)	17	—		Desamorfosis
"Ten Cuidao" (with Farina)	2020	—	17	—	—	—	—	—	—	—	—		Non-album single
"Tick Tock" (with Sofía Reyes and Farina)	2020	—	—	—	—	—	—	—	—	17	—		Desamorfosis
"Feliz Navidad"	2020	—	—	—	— (Note: "Felíz Navidad" did not enter the Dominican Airplay chart, but peaked at number six on the Dominican Pop Airplay chart.)	—	—	—	—	—	—		Navidad Melancólica
"Mojito"	2021	—	—	—	— (Note: "Mojito" did not enter the Dominican Airplay chart, but peaked at number 16 on the Dominican Pop Airplay chart.)	—	—	—	— (Note: "Mojito" did not enter the Puerto Rico chart, but peaked at number 9 on the Puerto Rico Pop chart.)	18	—		Desamorfosis
"Eres Mío"	2021	—	—	—	—	—	—	—	—	—	—		Desamorfosis
"Baila Así" (with Play-N-Skillz and Becky G featuring Chiquis)	2021	—	—	—	—	—	—	—	—	— (Note: "Baila Así" did not enter the Billboard Latin Pop Songs, but peaked at number 8 on the Latin Pop Digital Song Sales chart.)	—	RIAA: Gold (Latin)	Non-album single
"Psycho Bitch"	2022	19	—	—	—	14	—	—	20	14	—		Non-album single
"Para No Verte Más" (with Kenia Os)	2023	18	—	—	—	—	—	—	—	—	—		Thalia's Mixtape
"Devuélveme A Mi Chica" (with David Summers)	2023	—	—	—	—	—	—	—	—	—	—		Thalia's Mixtape
"Mixtape Medley"	2023	—	—	—	—	—	—	—	—	—	—		Thalia's Mixtape
"Bebé, Perdón"	2023	—	—	—	—	—	—	—	—	—	—		A Mucha Honra
"Choro" (with Estilo Sin Límite)	2023	—	—	—	—	—	—	—	—	—	—		A Mucha Honra
"Troca" (with Angela Aguilar)	2024	—	—	—	—	—	—	—	—	—	—		A Mucha Honra
"Te Va a Doler" (with Grupo Firme or Remix with Deorro)	2024	4	—	—	—	—	—	—	—	1	—		A Mucha Honra
"Nació La Luz" (with Marcos Witt)	2024	—	—	—	—	—	—	—	—	—	—		Navidad Melancólica
"Yo Me Lo Busqué" (with Los Ángeles Azules)	2025	2	2	18	—	—	—	—	—	1	—		Todo Suena Mejor en Cumbia
"Amiga Date Cuenta" (with Ha*Ash)	2025	—	—	—	—	—	—	—	—	15	—		Non-album single
"Tu Amor" (with Rave Jesus)	2025	—	—	—	—	—	—	—	—	—	—		Non-album single
"Ojitos Mexicanos"	2025	—	—	—	—	—	—	—	—	11	—		Todo Suena Mejor en Cumbia
"SANTA (Crush on You)" / "SANTA (Tengo un Crush Contigo)"	2025	—	—	—	—	—	—	—	—	—	—		Non-album single
"Miro Tu Cara En La Luna" (with Grupo Maximo Grado)	2026	—	—	—	—	—	—	—	—	—	—		Non-album single
"Dancing Queen"	2026	—	—	—	—	—	—	—	—	—	—		Todo Suena Mejor en Cumbia
"Boomerang"	2026	—	—	—	—	—	—	—	—	10	—		Todo Suena Mejor en Cumbia
"Todo, Todo, Todo" (with Yuri)	2026	—	—	—	—	—	—	—	—	—	—		Todo Suena Mejor en Cumbia
"Cariño Mío"	2026	—	—	—	—	—	—	—	—	—	—		Todo Suena Mejor en Cumbia
"A Quién Le Importa" (with Luck Ra)	2026	—	8	—	—	—	—	—	—	—	—		Non-album single
"—" denotes a recording that did not chart or was not released in that territory.

=== As featured artist ===
Year	Song	Peak chart positions								Certifications	Album
Year	Song	BEL	BOL	HUN	MEX Español Airplay	US Latin Pop Airplay	US Latin Pop	US Tropical Sales	US Jazz Sales	Certifications	Album
2010	"Love Me Tender" (duet with Elvis Presley)	—	—	—	—	—	—	—	—		Viva Elvis
2010	"De Qué Manera Te Olvido" (duet with Rocío Dúrcal)	—	—	—	—	—	—	—	—		Una Estrella En El Cielo
2011	"Mis Deseos/Feliz Navidad" (Michael Bublé featuring Thalía)	53	—	27	36	—	—	—	19	BPI: Silver	Christmas
2012	"The Way You Look Tonight" (duet with Tony Bennett)	—	—	—	—	—	—	—	15		Viva Duets
2013	"Me dediqué a perderte" (duet with Leonel García)	—	—	—	—	—	—	—	—		Todas mías
2014	"Sino A Ti" (Laura Pausini featuring Thalía)	—	—	—	34	—	18	—	—		20 – The Greatest Hits
2017	"Todo Me Gusta" (Carlos Vives featuring Thalía)	—	12	—	—	—	—	14	—		Vives
2017	"Triángulo" (Los Baby's featuring Thalía)	—	—	—	—	—	—	—	—		Tributo A Los Baby's
2020	"Color Esperanza" (Note: In May 2020, Sony Music Latin and Global Citizen teamed up to release a new version of the 2001 Diego Torres's song "Color Esperanza" to benefit the Pan American Health Organization's (PAHO) response to the COVID-19 pandemic. The track includes vocals by Torres, Lali, Rubén Blades, Mario Domm, Camilo, Pedro Capó, Coti, Dilsinho, El Cigala, Farruko, Fonseca, Kany García, Leonel García, Gente de Zona, Leslie Grace, Nicky Jam, Ara Malikian, Dani Martín, Mau y Ricky, Prince Royce, Rauw Alejandro, Reik, Río Roma, Carlos Rivera, Ivete Sangalo, Thalía, Ángela Torres, Manuel Turizo, Jorge Villamizar and Carlos Vives.) (Diego Torres featuring various artists)	—	—	—	—	21	—	—	—		Non-album singles
2020	"Pa' La Cultura" (David Guetta with Human(X) featuring Sofía Reyes, Abraham Mateo, De La Ghetto, Zion & Lennox, Manuel Turizo, Lalo Ebratt, Thalía and Maejor)	—	—	—	—	—	—	—	—		Non-album singles

=== Promotional singles ===
Year	Song	Album
1996	"Me Faltas Tú"	En Éxtasis
1996	"Lágrimas"	En Éxtasis
1998	"Dicen Por Ahí"	Amor A La Mexicana
1998	"Echa Pa'Lante"	Amor A La Mexicana
2008	"Será Porque Te Amo"	Lunada
2012	"Atmósfera"	Habitame Siempre
2013	"Chupie (The Binky That Returned to Home)"	Viva Kids Vol. 1
2014	"Tú Y Yo (Amore Mio Version)"	Amore Mio
2014	"Cerveza En Mexico"	Amore Mio
2015	"Si Alguna Vez"	Antes muerta que Lichita
2019	"Sube Sube" (featuring Fonseca)	Valiente
2019	"Corazón valiente"	Valiente
2020	"Por Amor Al Arte"	Valiente
2021	"Cristo Heme Aquí"	Non-album single
2023	"Pachuco" (with Roco Pachukote)	Thalia's Mixtape
2023	"La Muralla Verde" (with Ben Carrillo and Bruses)	Thalia's Mixtape
2023	"Florecita Rockera" (with Aterciopelados and Leon Leiden)	Thalia's Mixtape
2024	"Persiana Americana" (with Charly Alberti)	Thalia's Mixtape

== Other appearances ==
Title	Year	Album
"Todo Es Posible"	1996	Voces Unidas
"Viaje Tiempo Atrás" (Film's Version)	1997	Anastasia: Banda Sonora Original
"Una Vez en Diciembre"	1997	Anastasia: Banda Sonora Original
"Lograrás Hacerlo"	1997	Anastasia: Banda Sonora Original
"Echa Pa' Lante (Spanglish Cha-Cha Mix)"	1998	Dance with Me: Music from the Motion Picture
"Amor Prohibido"	2005	Selena ¡Vive!
"Cuando nadie me ve"	2013	Y Si Fueran Ellas
"Quien Sera with Julio Iglesias"	2017	Mexico & Amigos

== Music videos ==
Year	Video	Director	Album
1990	Un Pacto Entre Los Dos	Benny Corral	Thalía
1990	Saliva	Benny Corral	Thalía
1990	Pienso En Ti¹	-	Thalía
1991	Amarillo Azul¹	-	Thalía
1991	Sudor¹	-	Mundo De Cristal
1991	En La Intimidad	Carlos Somonte	Mundo De Cristal
1991	En La Intimidad ("Siempre En Domingo" Beach Version)¹	-	Mundo De Cristal
1992	Te Necesito¹	-	Mundo De Cristal
1992	Fuego Cruzado	L. Hernandez	Mundo De Cristal
1992	Fuego Cruzado ("Siempre En Domingo" Horse Version)¹	-	Mundo De Cristal
1992	Sangre	-	Love
1992	María Mercedes	Beatriz Sheridan	Love
1992	Love	-	Love
1992	Love (Waterfall Version)¹	-	Love
1992	La Vie En Rose (La Vida En Rosa)	-	Love
1992	El Bronceador	-	Love
1992	El Bronceador (Pool Version)¹	-	Love
1992	El Día Del Amor	-	Love
1992	No Trates De Engañarme	-	Love
1992	Déjame Escapar	-	Love
1992	Flor De Juventud	-	Love
1992	Sangre (Second Version)	-	Love
1994	Marimar	-	Single - Marimar
1995	Piel Morena	Daniel Gruener	En Éxtasis
1995	Amándote	Peter Begman	En Éxtasis
1995	María La Del Barrio	Beatriz Sheridan	En Éxtasis
1995	Quiero Hacerte El Amor¹	-	En Éxtasis
1996	Gracias A Dios	Benny Corral	En Éxtasis
1996	Lágrimas¹	-	En Éxtasis
1997	Nandito Ako	-	Nandito Ako
1997	Amor A La Mexicana	Benny Corral	Amor A La Mexicana
1997	Viaje Tiempo Atrás	Don Bluth	Anastasia
1997	Por Amor / Por Amor (Remix)	Gustavo Garzón	Amor A La Mexicana
1998	Mujer Latina	Gustavo Garzón	Amor A La Mexicana
1998	Mujer Latina (European Version)	-	Amor A La Mexicana
1998	Amor A La Mexicana (European Remix)	-	Amor A La Mexicana
2000	Entre El Mar Y Una Estrella	Simon Brand	Arrasando
2000	Regresa A Mí	Simon Brand	Arrasando
2000	Arrasando / It's My Party	Simon Brand	Arrasando
2000	Rosalinda	Beatriz Sheridan	Arrasando
2001	Reencarnación	Emilio Estefan	Arrasando
2001	Amor A La Mexicana (Emilio Banda Remix)	Emilio Estefan	Con Banda: Grandes Éxitos
2002	Tú Y Yo	Antii Jokinen	Thalía
2002	Tú Y Yo (Cumbia Version) (featuring Kumbia Kings)	Leche, Antii Jokinen	Thalía
2002	No Me Enseñaste	Antii Jokinen	Thalía
2002	Y Seguir¹	-	Thalía
2003	¿A Quién Le Importa?	Mo Zarte	Thalía
2003	I Want You / Me Pones Sexy (featuring Fat Joe)	Dave Meyers	Thalía (English)
2003	Baby I'm In Love / Alguien Real	Antii Jokinen	Thalía (English)
2004	Cerca De Ti	Jeb Brien	Thalía (English)
2004	Acción Y Reacción	-	Greatest Hits
2005	Amar Sin Ser Amada / You Know He Never Loved You	Jeb Brien	El Sexto Sentido
2005	Un Alma Sentenciada	Jeb Brien	El Sexto Sentido
2006	Seducción	Jeb Brien	El Sexto Sentido
2006	Cantando por un sueño	Jeb Brien	El Sexto Sentido: Re+Loaded
2006	Olvídame	Thalía	El Sexto Sentido: Re+Loaded
2006	No, No, No (featuring Romeo Santos)	-	El Sexto Sentido: Re+Loaded
2008	Ten Paciencia	Emilio Estefan	Lunada
2009	Equivocada	Nahuel Lerena	Primera Fila
2010	Qué Será De Ti	Nahuel Lerena	Primera Fila
2010	Con La Duda (featuring Joan Sebastian)	Nahuel Lerena	Primera Fila
2010	Estoy Enamorado (featuring Pedro Capó)	Nahuel Lerena	Primera Fila
2010	Enseñame A Vivir (iTunes Plus Version)	Nahuel Lerena	Primera Fila
2010	Enseñame A Vivir	-	Primera Fila
2011	El Próximo Viernes	-	Primera Fila
2012	The Way You Look Tonight (with Tony Bennett)	-	Viva Duets
2012	Manías (Lyric Video)	Ruslan Shakirov	Habítame Siempre
2012	Manías (Studio Version)	-	Habítame Siempre
2012	Manías	Bruce Gowers	Habítame Siempre
2013	Habítame Siempre	Bruce Gowers	Habítame Siempre
2013	Me Dedique A Perderte (With Leonel Garcia)	-	Todas Mías
2013	Te Perdiste Mi Amor (featuring Prince Royce)	Bruce Gowers, Emilio Estefan	Habítame Siempre
2013	La Apuesta (Hammerstein Concert Version) (featuring Erik Rubín)	Bruce Gowers	Habítame Siempre
2013	La Apuesta (featuring Erik Rubín)	Diego Álvarez	Habítame Siempre
2014	Estou Apaixonado (featuring Daniel)	Thalía	Thalía (Brazil album)
2014	Tema De Chupi	-	Viva Kids Vol. 1
2014	Vamos A Jugar (Lyric Video)	-	Viva Kids Vol. 1
2014	Vamos A Jugar	-	Viva Kids Vol. 1
2014	El Piojo Y La Pulga	-	Viva Kids Vol. 1
2014	El Garabato Colorado	-	Viva Kids Vol. 1
2014	La Risa De Las Vocales	-	Viva Kids Vol. 1
2014	Caballo De Palo	-	Viva Kids Vol. 1
2014	En Un Bosque De La China	-	Viva Kids Vol. 1
2014	Sugar Rush	-	Viva Kids Vol. 1
2014	Las Mañanitas	-	Viva Kids Vol. 1
2014	Osito Carpintero	-	Viva Kids Vol. 1
2014	Estrellita	-	Viva Kids Vol. 1
2014	Sino A Ti (with Laura Pausini)	Leandro Manuel Emede and Nicolo Cerioni	20 – The Greatest Hits
2014	Por Lo Que Reste De Vida	Leandro Manuel Emede and Nicolo Cerioni	Amore Mio
2015	Como Tú No Hay Dos (ft. Becky G)	Hannah Lux Davis	Amore Mio
2015	Sólo Parecía Amor	Hannah Lux Davis	Amore Mio
2016	Desde Esa Noche (ft. Maluma)	Carlos Perez	Latina
2016	Vuelveme a Querer	Gustavo Garzón	Latina
2016	Todavía Te Quiero	Bruno Scopazzo	Latina
2018	"No Me Acuerdo" (feat. Natti Natasha)	Daniel Duran	Valiente
2018	"Lento" (feat. Gente de Zona)	Santiago Salviche	Valiente
2019	"Lindo Pero Bruto" (feat. Lali)	Daniel Duran	Valiente
2019	"Qué Ironía" (First Lyric Video Version) (featuring Carlos Rivera)		Valiente
2019	"Qué Ironía" (Second Lyric Video Version) (featuring Carlos Rivera)		Valiente
2019	"Ahí" (8D Version Lyric Video) (featuring Ana Mena)		Valiente
2019	"Vikingo"	MG Video Productions	Valiente
2020	"Ya Tú Me Conoces" (with Mau y Ricky)		TBA
2020	"Lo Siento Mucho" (with Río Roma)		TBA
2020	"Tímida" (with Pabllo Vittar)		111

¹Some music videos were made for special TV (or other) appearances

== Video albums ==
=== Music video compilations ===
- Greatest Hits Videos (2004)

=== Concert DVDs ===
- Primera Fila (2009)
- Habítame Siempre (2012)
- Viva Tour (En Vivo) (2013)

=== Box sets ===
- La Historia (2010)

== See also ==
- List of best-selling albums in Mexico
- List of best-selling albums in the Philippines
- List of best-selling Latin albums
- List of best-selling Latin music artists
