= Thalía's Hits Remixed =

Remix album by Thalía
- Released: 25 February 2003 (United States)
- Recorded: 1995–2003
- Genre: Latin pop; dance
- Length: 57:55
- Label: EMI Latin
- Producer: Lawrence Dermer, Emilio Estefan Jr., David Ferrero, Allen Kelman, Pedro del Moral, Steve Morales, Bernardo Ossa, Archie Pena, Poke, Cory Rooney, Kike Santander, Fábio Tabach

Thalía chronology
Thalía (2002)	Thalía's Hits Remixed (2003)	Thalía (2003)

Singles from Thalía's Hits Remixed
- 1. "A Quién le Importa (Club Mix Hex Hector-Mac Qualye Re-Mixes)"; 2. "It's My Party (English Version)"

Thalía's Hits Remixed is a remix album by Latin pop singer Thalía released on 25 February 2003 in North America. It contains remixes of many of her hits, such as "Amor a la Mexicana", "Piel Morena", "No Me Enseñaste" and "Tú y Yo." It also contains the English version of "Arrasando", called "It's My Party" that was released only on CD single back in 2001 and the previously unreleased medley that Thalía recorded especially for her the 2001 Latin Grammy Awards performance. In the Japanese version, the remix of "The Mexican (Dance Dance)"' used was the "Hex Hector-Mac Qualye Radio Remix".

Thalía's Hits Remixed received generally favorable critical response. Commercially, the album peaked within the top five on Billboard's charts Top Dance/Electronic Albums and Latin Pop Albums, while reached the number 7 on the Top Latin Albums and 26 on the Top Heatseekers Albums. Thalía's Hits Remixed received a Platinum (Latin) certification by the Recording Industry Association of America (RIAA), denoting 100,000 shipments.

== Background ==
Since her first studio album on the EMI label Thalía's albums were released with added remixes of some songs as bonus tracks. In 1997, after the success of the album En éxtasis EMI released an EP entitled Bailando en Éxtasis which included remixes of the album, but none of the remixes from the EP were included in Thalía's Hits Remixed, instead the Hitmakers Version of "Piel Morena" that was added, that version appeared in the album Por Amor (French version of the album Amor a la Mexicana) and was used to promote the album in Brazil. From the next Thalía's album Amor a la Mexicana, "Mujer Latina" (Remix "España"), "Por Amor" (Primera Vez Remix) and "Amor a la Mexicana" (Cuca's Fiesta Mix) were added, the latter was the version released as a single in France in 1997 and has a different music video, the single of the song was certified gold there and in the same year others two remixes of "Amor a la Mexicana" were added as bonus tracks in international editions in some countries. Representing the Arrasando album are the remix of "Entre el Mar y una Estrella" (Pablo Flores Club Mix), the English version of "Arrasando" and a medley of the songs "Entre el Mar y una Estrella" and "Arrasando" that would be used in a performance at the 2001 Latin Grammy which was canceled due to the September 11 attacks. From Thalía's 2002 self-titled album was included the remixes "A Quién le Importa" (Hex Hector / Mac Quayle Club Mix), "Tú y Yo" (Ballad Version), "No me Enseñaste" (Estéfano Remix) and "The Mexican (Dance Dance) "(Hex Hector / Mac Quayle Radio Mix).

== Reception ==
=== Critical response ===
Professional ratings
Review scores
Source	Rating
Allmusic	3/5 stars
Billboard Magazine	Favorable
About.com	3.5/5 stars

Thalía's Hits Remixed received generally favorable reviews from music critics. Ron Slomowicz from About.com gave the album a favorable review and stated that while he "don't speak a word of Spanish" he "can feel the emotion through the chord changes, tempo transitions, and Thalia's heartfelt vocal interpretations". Billboard's Michael Paoletta gave the album a favorable review in which he wrote that "Remix package can be hit or miss" and that Thalía's Hits Remixed "fall in to the former category". He also picked "Amor a la Mexicana" (Cuca's Fiesta Mix) as the "absolute highlight of the set". Jason Birchmeier from AllMusic gave the album three out of four stars in a mixed review in which he wrote that the album is "for fanatics only" and one of Thalía's "least listenable albums" even though it "served as a good stopgap release in 2003" after Thalía "having released her smash self-titled album".

=== Commercial performance ===
In Europe, Thalía's Hits Remixed reached the number 25 and 99 in Greece and Spain, respectively. In the United States, it failed to chart on the Billboard 200. However, it reached the number 26 on the Top Heatseekers chart, four on the Top Dance/Electronic Albums, and the top ten within Top Latin Albums and Latin Pop Albums. It was certified with a Latin Platinum award by the Recording Industry Association of America (RIAA), denoting shipments of 100,000 units in the U.S.

== Track listing ==
No.	Title	Writer(s)	Length
1.	"A Quién le Importa" (Hex Hector/Mac Quayle Club Mix)	Carlos García, Berlanga, Ignacio Canut	7:12
2.	"It's My Party" (Arrasando English Version)	Lawrence Dermer, Robin Dermer, Emilio Estefan Jr., Thalía	3:56
3.	"Amor a la Mexicana" (Cuca's Fiesta Mix)	Mario Pupparo	6:49
4.	"Piel Morena" (Hitmakers Remix)	Kike Santander	5:12
5.	"Mujer Latina" (Remix "España")	Kike Santander	3:52
6.	"The Mexican (Dance Dance)" (Hex Hector/Mac Quayle Radio Mix)	Thalía, Cory Rooney, JC Oliver, S. Barne, Alan Shacklock	3:28
7.	"No Me Enseñaste" (Estéfano Remix)	Estéfano, Julio C. Reyes	4:18
8.	"Entre el Mar y una Estrella" (Pablo Flores Club Mix)	Emilio Estefan Jr., Marco Flores	10:50
9.	"Por Amor" (Primera Vez Remix)	Kike Santander	4:39
10.	"Tú y Yo" (Ballad Version)	Julio C. Reyes, Estéfano	3:28
11.	"Entre el Mar y una Estrella/Arrasando" (Medley)	Emilio Estefan Jr., Marco Flores/Thalía, Emilio Estefan Jr., Lawrence P. Dermer, Robin Dermer	4:06
12.	"A Quién le Importa" (Bonus Enhanced Video)	Carlos García, Berlanga, Ignacio Canut

== Charts ==
=== Weekly charts ===
Charts	Peak Position
Greece International Albums (IFPI Greece)	25
Spanish Albums (Promusicae)	99
US Top Latin Albums (Billboard)	7
US Latin Pop Albums (Billboard)	4
US Top Dance Albums (Billboard)	4
US Top Heatseekers (Billboard)	26

=== Year-end charts ===
Chart (2003)	Peak position
US Billboard Latin Albums	33
US Latin Pop Albums (Billboard)	14
US Top Dance/Electronic Albums (Billboard)	16

== Certifications and sales ==
Region	Certification	Certified units/sales
United States (RIAA)	Platinum (Latin)	100,000^{^}
^{^} Shipments figures based on certification alone.
