= Thalía con banda: Grandes éxitos =

Greatest hits album by Thalía
- Released: 28 August 2001
- Recorded: Various
- Genres: Latin pop; Banda
- Length: 56:00
- Label: EMI Latin

Thalía chronology
Arrasando (2000)	Thalía con banda: Grandes éxitos (2001)	Thalía (2002)

Singles from Thalía con banda: Grandes éxitos
- 1. "Arrasando (Banda Version)"; 2. "Amor A La Mexicana (Banda Version)"; 3. "Piel Morena (Banda Version)"; 4. "La Revancha"

Thalía con banda: Grandes éxitos is a 2001 compilation album by Thalía. The album was released in August 2001 while successful singles off her Arrasando album were still receiving heavy airplay, like "Arrasando", "Reencarnacion" and "It's My Party."

The album includes ten of Thalía's greatest hits remade in banda style, plus two new banda tracks "La Revancha" and "Cuco Peña" and two bonus remixes of "Piel Morena" and "Amor a la mexicana." The only video filmed from this album was for the mix of "Amor a la mexicana" but the single did not have great success.

According to Billboard, Thalía con banda: Grandes éxitos earned various music certifications, including a Gold award in Spain, becoming the first banda album to do so, and a Platinum (Latin) in the United States.

== Background and production ==
After the success of Thalía's first three studio albums by EMI, which reached multimillions of sales according to Billboard magazine, the singer and her record company decided to launch a record with the hit songs from her previous musical productions with the label. Instead of launching a common collection Thalía decided to gather the past hits arranged in the banda style. About recording an album of Banda music, she stated: "I spent my entire adolescence listening to banda with my friends [...] And on the other hand, my life has changed drastically since I've been living in the U.S., and everything holds a terrible nostalgia ... Losing your customs, your friends".

The bass of the album was recorded in Los Mochis, Sinaloa. Thalía said that the album is "completely Mexican music, very much from our roots (…) it is a dream that I always longed for and that I will finally achieve". The album was released at Hacienda de Los Morales, one of the most typical restaurants in Mexico City. The album was produced by Memo Gil and featured arrangements by Adolfo and Omar Valenzuela and Pancho Ruíz, composers of the banda musical genre.

== Critical reception ==
Professional ratings
Review scores
Source	Rating
AMG	4/5 stars
Billboard	Favorable

The album received favorable reviews from music critics. Drago Bonacich from the website AllMusic gave the album four out of five stars. Leila Cobo from Billboard gave the album a favorable review and said that Thalía's strong vocals stand out even though she complained that the frequent whispering in some songs is "distracting". In a report on the album, the ¡HOLA! magazine praised the album and stated that "Thalia is once again at the forefront" and that once again she "surprises us with a totally renewed image. With the new album, she reinvents herself once again, showing why she continues to be number one."

The album was nominated for a Latin Grammy for Best Banda Album at the 3rd Annual Show in 2002.

== Commercial performance ==
The album achieved success by its genre standards. Thalía con banda: Grandes éxitos shifted 75,000 units in its first day of release. The album sold an estimated half-million copies worldwide. In late 2001, Billboard said that the album sold well, and proved "appealing both to regional Mexican and pop audiences who do not seem turned off by the singer's new look or sound". Although sources stated that EMI awarded the album a gold record for its sales in Mexico, it was not certified by AMPROFON.

Thalía con banda: Grandes éxitos entered the Billboard 200 at number 167, and peaked at number two in both Billboard's Top Latin Albums and Regional Mexican Albums. The album was certified "Disco De Platino" by the Recording Industry Association of America for shipment of 100,000 copies to the United States. According to Leila Cobo from Billboard, Thalía received multiple certifications for the album's sales in the United States and Latin America. "Amor a la Mexicana (version banda)" stayed four weeks at number one in Thalía's home country, according to her record label.

In Europe, Thalía con banda: Grandes éxitos debuted at number 24 on the Hungarian Charts, and stayed three weeks at number one in Greece. It became the first Regional Mexican-style album to be certified in Spain, and entered in markets such as Czech Republic, Portugal, Russia, Canada, Israel, and Bulgaria.

== Track listing ==
No.	Title	Writer(s)	Length
1.	"Amor a la Mexicana"	Mario Pupparo	3:58
2.	"Piel Morena"	Kike Santander	4:37
3.	"Rosalinda"	K. Santander	3:53
4.	"Quiero Hacerte el Amor"	Daniel Garcia, Mario Schajris	3:47
5.	"Arrasando"	Thalia Sodi, Emilio Estefan Jr., Lawrence P. Dermer, Robin Dermer	3:58
6.	"Cuco Peña"	T. Sodi	3:49
7.	"Por Amor"	K. Santander	3:54
8.	"Entre el mar y una estrella"	Marco Flores	3:29
9.	"María la del Barrio"	Viviana Pímstein, Paco Navarrete	3:55
10.	"Noches Sin Luna"	Jose Miguel Velasquez, K. Santander	3:48
11.	"La revancha"	T. Sodi	4:01
12.	"Gracias a Dios"	Juan Gabriel	3:45
13.	"Amor a la Mexicana" (Emilio Mix)	M. Pupparo	4:01
14.	"Piel Morena" (Emilio Mix)	K. Santander	4:40

== Charts ==
=== Weekly charts ===
Country	Peak position
Greece International Albums (IFPI Greece)	1
Hungarian Albums (MAHASZ)	17
Spain Albums Chart (Promusicae)	7
US Billboard 200	167
US Top Latin Albums (Billboard)	2
US Regional Mexican Albums (Billboard)	2
US Heatseekers Albums (Billboard)	7

=== Year-end charts ===
Chart (2001)	Peak position
Hungarian Albums Chart	143
US Top Latin Albums (Billboard)	51
US Regional Mexican Albums (Billboard)	18

== Certifications and sales ==
Region	Certification	Certified units/sales
Spain (Promusicae)	Gold	80,000
United States (RIAA)	Platinum (Latin)	100,000^{^}
^{^} Shipments figures based on certification alone.
