= No me enseñaste =

Single by Thalía

from the album Thalía
- Released: July 2002
- Recorded: 2002
- Genre: Rock
- Length: 4:26
- Label: EMI Latin
- Songwriters: Estéfano; Julio Reyes
- Producer: Estéfano

Thalía singles chronology
"Tú Y Yo" (2002)	"No me enseñaste" (2002)	"¿A Quién Le Importa?" (2003)

Music video
- "No me enseñaste" on YouTube

"No me enseñaste" (English: You Did Not Teach Me) is a song by Mexican singer and songwriter Thalía, taken from her self-titled eighth studio album released in 2002. Written by Estéfano and Julio Reyes, it was produced by the former. "No me enseñaste" was released as the second single from the album during July 2002 in America, while being the third one in Europe. It is a rock ballad which features electric guitar, piano and percussion. Lyrically, it's a heartbreaking ballad about desolation and the pain one feels after the end of a relationship.

Critically, "No me enseñaste" is one of Thalia's most recognizable ballads, with the majority of the critics commending either its lyrics or Thalia's performance on the track. Concurrently with the critics, the song also attained success on the charts; it topped the US Hot Latin Songs for two weeks - her first song to do so -, while also topping the Bolivian and Mexican charts, as well as reaching the top-three in Argentina and Panama, and top-five in Perú and Venezuela.

Thalía shot the music video for the song in Soho, Manhattan (in New York City) and it was directed by Antti Jokinen. Released in August of the same year, the video features the singer in a garage-style space with her band, intercut with shots of Thalía singing in the rain. Thalía performed the song numerous times, including the 2002 Latin Grammy Awards, where she stood atop a platform, with a costume featuring an extended, illuminated skirt effect, as well as the Premio Lo Nuestro 2004, where the song was nominated for a Lo Nuestro Award for Pop Song of the Year. It was also featured on her 2004 High Voltage Tour, and part of a medley on both Viva! Tour (2013) and Latina Love Tour (2016).

== Background, composition and release ==
Work on Thalia's eighth studio album commenced in early 2002, with Estéfano being one of the main writers and producers of the album, as requested by Sony Music Latin. In an interview for Billboard, he revealed he was "told to write songs in a fresher, more aggressive vein, and he developed a strong rapport with the singer." "No Me Enseñaste" was all written and produced by Estéfano, while having writing credits by Julio Reyes. They both were also responsible for sound design, while Reyes arranged and programmed the song, while also providing accordion. Guitars were played by Dan Warner, Armando Gola provided bass, and additional programming was conducted by Mauricio Gasca. Recording took place at MidnightBlue Studios in Miami, Florida.

"No Me Enseñaste" was released as the album's second single in July 2002, with the song also being available in three different versions: a dance remix, a regional rendition and a salsa version, with the latter being produced by Marc Anthony. The four versions of the song - including the original - were available on a promotional CD single. It was sent to radio stations a month later at the end of August 2002. The song is a rock ballad that starts with sparse piano and percussion before transitioning into a "broad, catchy chorus" filled with electric guitars. Lyrically, the song is a heartbreaking tale about desolation, pain, heartbreak, and resignation that one feels after the sudden end of a relationship.

== Critical reception ==
Writing for Billboard, Leila Cobo wrote two distinct reviews of the song. While reviewing the album, Cobo praised her vocals, saying it "highlights a voice with range and pathos. Meanwhile, in its single review, Cobo called it a "moody, broody heartbreak ballad [...] the kind of track that Spanish-language radio loves". She praised the "straightforward, mesmerizing" opening verse, as well as its lyrics, saying: "it's typical Estéfano in its blend of the colloquial and romantic and manages to avoid hokeyness in conveying desolation." The Spanish website Estación Zafiro commended for being a "powerful ballad", stating: "No Me Enseñaste" not only became a classic of Latin pop, but also showcased Thalía’s versatility as a performer." [...] "Ultimately, it is one of those songs that hurt… but also heal." When Ron Slomowicz reviewed Thalía's Hits Remixed album, he named it a "Gloria Estefan-channeling" song. In his list of "Best Thalía Songs", Carlos Quintana called "No me enseñaste" a "romantic song [that] has been one of the most celebrated Thalia songs since its release back in 2002."

While reviewing her Greatest Hits album, Jason Birchmeier of AllMusic selected it as one of the album's highlights, whilst Colin Jacobson of DVD Movie Guide wrote favorably that the song "feels like a throwback for Thalia. The power ballad easily would have fit into the tracklist for any of her first three albums. That’s pretty much a compliment, given my feelings about those records." In March 2022, Billboard named it as the 87th best song of 2002. While writing about the track, Griselda Flores called it the "ultimate breakup anthem" that "showed fans another side of the singer, who was generally known for her more up-tempo pop songs (Arrasando, Tú y Yo), allowing her to shine as a vocalist delivering a head-turning performance, with such pathos to make you really feel for her. Twenty years later, Thalía’s heartfelt rendition of the ballad still inspires goosebumps." Another Billboard writer, Lucas Villa, while ranking her "10 Best Songs", affirmed "its sweeping melodies and heartbreak lyrics are perfectly suited for Thalia’s dramatic flair."

== Chart performance ==
On the US Billboard Hot Latin Tracks chart in United States, the single debuted at number 49 on the week of 24 August 2002, and climb to number-one nine weeks later, becoming Thalía's third chart topper there (and second consecutive after Tú y Yo). "No Me Enseñaste" spent two weeks at pole position - her first and only song to spend more than one week at the top -, as well as twelve non-consecutive weeks in the top-ten and 28 weeks in the chart. It also attained success in other countries, peaking atop of the charts in Bolivia and Mexico, where it remained for four weeks at the latter's radio charts. It also became a huge success in Argentina and Panama - reaching number two in both charts -, while also reaching the top-five in both Perú and Venezuela.

== Music video ==
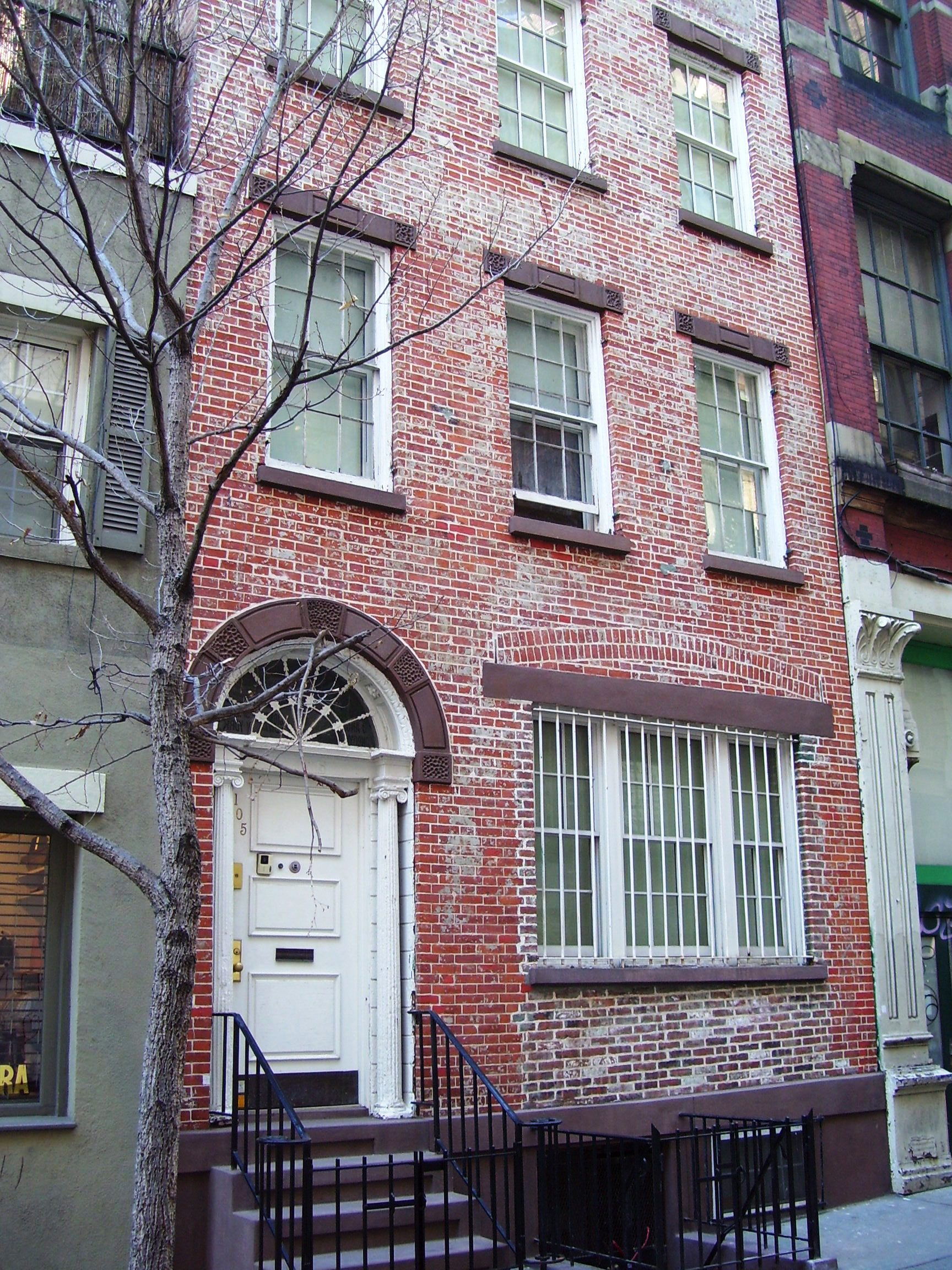
Thalía shot the music video for the song in Soho, Manhattan.

Thalía shot the music video for "No me enseñaste" in Soho, Manhattan - in New York City - with Antti Jokinen as the director. Shooting took place on 25 June 2002. It premiered in late August and it "intersperses faux band rehearsal shots with images of a rainy day." In August 2020, the singer celebrated the 200 million views that the video reached on YouTube. In late 2021, Thalía updated her videos on YouTube, remastering the majority of them, including the "No me enseñaste" video.

== Live performances and accolades ==
"No me enseñaste" was performed live several times. Its first televised performance occurred at the 3rd Annual Latin Grammy Awards on 18 September 2002. In the performance, Thalía started with the original song while sitting atop of a huge platform hovering over a constellation of shimmering lights in the shape of a dress. Midway through the performance, the arrangement switched into a vibrant, high-octane salsa version of the song (produced by Marc Anthony). Two days later, she performed the song at 2002 Hispanic Heritage Awards, similarly using the same version of the Latin Grammy performance, starting out as a ballad and transitioning into its salsa version. At the 2004 Premio Lo Nuestro, Thalía also performed the song, where it was nominated for a Lo Nuestro Award for Pop Song of the Year.

"No me enseñaste" was part of Thalía's High Voltage Tour in 2004, as well as part of a medley during her 2013 Viva! Tour and the Latina Love Tour (2016). "No me enseñaste" was nominated for two 2003 Latin Billboard Music Awards; the original in "Pop Track Female" and the salsa version in the "Tropical Track Female" category. Also, the song won “Song of the Year” at Premios Gente. Argentinian artist Cazzu performed the song on her tour, Latinaje (2025), which received praise by Thalía herself.

== Track listings ==
CD single

1. "No me enseñaste" – 4:25
2. "No me enseñaste" [Marc Anthony Mix / Salsa Remix] – 4:30
3. "No me enseñaste" [Estéfano Mix / Dance Remix] – 4:18
4. "No me enseñaste" [Regional Version] – 3:05

== Charts ==
=== Weekly charts ===
Chart (2002)	Peak Position
Argentina (CAPIF)	2
Bolivia (Notimex)	1
México (Monitor Latino)	1
Panama (Notimex)	2
Paraguay Airplay	8
Perú (El Siglo de Torreón)	5
US Bubbling Under Hot 100 Singles (Billboard)	3
US Hot Latin Songs (Billboard)	1
US Latin Tropical/Salsa Airplay (Billboard)	1
Venezuela (El Siglo de Torreón)	5

=== Year-end charts ===
Chart (2002)	Peak position
US Hot Latin Tracks (Billboard)	29
US Latin Pop Airplay (Billboard)	32
US Tropical Airplay (Billboard)	35
