= Entre el Mar y una Estrella =

Single by Thalía

from the album Arrasando
- Released: 27 March 2000
- Studio: Crescent Moon Studios, Miami, Florida
- Genre: Pop
- Length: 3:44
- Label: EMI Latin
- Songwriter: Emilio Estefan Jr. • Marco Flores
- Producers: Estefan, Jr.; Flores

Thalía singles chronology
"Echa Pa'lante" (1999)	"Entre el Mar y una Estrella" (2000)	"Regresa a Mí" (2000)

Music video
- "Entre el Mar y una Estrella" on YouTube

"Entre el Mar y una Estrella" (transl. "Between the Sea and a Star") is a song by Mexican singer Thalía from her sixth studio album, Arrasando (2000). It was released as the album's lead single on 27 March 2000 by EMI Latin. The song was written and co-produced by Emilio Estefan and Marco Flores. The track is a pop ballad that deals with lost love and the song was dedicated to her former lover, Alfredo Díaz Ordaz, who died in 1993.

The song received positive reactions from music critics, who found it to be a gentle ballad. The accompanying music video was directed by Simón Brand and filmed in Brooklyn, New York. The visual was nominated Best Latin Clip and Video of the Year at the Billboard Video Music Awards and El Premio de la Gente in 2000, respectively. Commercially, it reached number one in Costa Rica and the Billboard Hot Latin Songs, Latin Pop Airplay, and Tropical Airplay charts in the United States. The song also peaked at the top ten in Ecuador, Honduras, Panama, Paraguay, Spain, and Venezuela.

== Background and composition ==
In 1997, Thalía released her fifth studio album, Amor a la Mexicana, which sold over 2 million copies. Following the release and tour of the album, she would later star in the Mexican telenovela Rosalinda (1999) and film Mambo Café (2000). During this time, the singer started recording her sixth album; EMI Latin's press manager, Rosario Valeriano, claimed that "Thalía wanted to prepare a quality product, so it took almost a year to make it. It's true that it took a while but it was worth the wait, because it comes, as the album title says, 'triumphing' strongly internationally". For the album, Thalía wrote eight tracks, with the help of other songwriters, such as Kike Santander and Roberto Blades, whilst Emilio Estefan produced the album. Valeriano also claimed, "All we know is that Mr. Estefan trusted Thalía, when it comes to writing her own music, and this shows that aside from singing very well, she can also show how good she is on the writing part".

"Entre el Mar y una Estrella"
A sample of Thalía's song "Entre el Mar y una Estrella". According to The Monitor's Vilma Maldonado, the song "begins with ethnic signing from the soul similar to tribal music".

Thalía also commissioned a song for the album from her friend Marco Flores, who has written songs for the artist since she was part of Timbiriche in the 1980s. This led to Flores composing the album's opening track "Entre el Mar y una Estrella" along with Estefan. When Thalía first heard it, she recalled telling Flores: "'Marco, how bad you are, how bad you are! You're playing with my feelings, but I'm going to record it, I don't care' and I recorded it because I loved it". It is a pop ballad about lost love. Thalía described the song as "reminiscent of all human beings to feel that once they were in love in such a way, and suddenly their partner left, died or disappeared or ended" and further elaborated that it "reflects that nostalgia but with a beautiful, sweet and romantic rhythms, yet danceable". Thalía dedicated the song to her former lover Alfredo Díaz Ordaz who died of hepatitis C in 1993. The song was recorded at the Crescent Moon Studios in Miami. This was the second song that Thalía dedicated to Ordaz, after "Sangre" in 1992. Thalía would later re-record "Entre el Mar y una Estrella" as a banda track, which was included on her compilation album Thalía con banda: Grandes éxitos (2001).

== Music video ==
The music video for "Entre El Mar y una Estrella" was directed by Simón Brand and filmed in Brooklyn, New York. Luis del Valle of BuzzFeed described the video as "everything you'd expect from a 2000s pop star: exotic costumes, close-ups that would make any mortal look terrible, and water dripping everywhere." The video received airplay on music video channels throughout Latin America. The visual was nominated in the category of Best Clip of the Year in the Latin field at the 2000 Billboard Video Music Awards but lost to "Ritmo Total" (1999) by Enrique Iglesias. It also received a nomination at the 2000 El Premio de la Gente in the category of Video of the Year but lost to "Atado a Tu Amor" by Chayanne.

== Promotion and reception ==
"Entre el Mar y una Estrella" was released as the album's lead single on 27 March 2000 by EMI Latin. It was later included on her compilation album, Greatest Hits (2004). A remix version by Pablo Flores was featured on the compilation album Thalía's Hits Remixed (2003). Thalía recorded a live version of the song as part of a medley on her live album Primera Fila (2009). AllMusic's Jason Birchmeier described the song as "airy" and noted it as one of the two "slower songs that help relieve the intensity" along with "No Hay Que Llorar". An editor for Qvmagazine called it a "gentle ballad". Chuck Taylor of Billboard regarded the song as a "stylish romantic ballad that should spark interest in a long list of follow-up single prospects". In a positive review of the album, El Norte critic Deborah Davis referred the track as "honeyed nostalgia". On the website Caras, Alejandra Morón listed the song as one of the most iconic in Thalía's career in 2021. In a fan poll published by Billboard, "Entre el Mar y una Estrella" was selected as the best song to reach number one in 2000.

Commercially, it became Thalía's first number one song on the Billboard Hot Latin Songs chart in the United States. It also reached the top spot on the Billboard Latin Pop Airplay and Tropical Airplay subcharts as well. Due to the fact that tropical stations do not generally play pop ballads, EMI Latin was suspected of performing payola, and after further investigation by the magazine, it was removed from the chart for one week on 24 June 2000. According to Notimex, it reached number one in Costa Rica and reached the top-ten in Ecuador, Honduras, Panama, Paraguay, and Venezuela. In addition, it reached number five in Spain.

== Accolades ==
Awards for "Entre el Mar y una Estrella"
Award	Year	Category	Result	Ref.
Billboard Music Video Awards	2000	Best Clip of the Year — Latin	Nominated	
Ritmo Latino - Premio de la Gente	2000	Music Video of the Year	Nominated	

== Formats and track listings ==
Remixes

1. Entre El Mar y una Estrella (Album Version) – 3:43
2. Entre El Mar y una Estrella (Pablo Flores Miami Mix (Radio Edit) – 4:12
3. Entre El Mar y una Estrella (Pablo Flores Miami Mix) – 10:50
4. Entre El Mar y una Estrella (Pablo Flores Dub) – 8:50

== Personnel ==
Adapted from the Arrasando liner notes:

- Thalía – lead vocals
- Marco Flores – background vocals, producer, songwriter, arranger
- Emilio Estefan Jr. – songwriter, producer, mix engineer, music arranger
- Freddy Piñero Jr. – engineer
- Charles Dye – engineer
- Robb Williams – engineer
- Mike Gouzauski – engineer
- Ricky Blanco – assistant engineer
- Tony Martini – assistant engineer
- Ken Theis – assistant engineer
- Ralf Stemman – keyboards, arranger
- René Toledo – guitar
- Archie Peña – percussion

== Chart performance ==
=== Weekly charts ===
Weekly chart positions for "Entre el Mar y una Estrella"
Chart (2000)	Peak position
Chile (EFE)	4
Costa Rica (EFE)	1
Ecuador (EFE)	6
Guatemala (EFE)	5
Honduras (EFE)	6
Panama (EFE)	10
Spain (AFYVE)	5
US Bubbling Under Hot 100 (Billboard)	2
US Hot Latin Songs (Billboard)	1
US Latin Pop Airplay (Billboard)	1
US Tropical Airplay (Billboard)	1
US Regional Mexican Airplay (Billboard)	25
Venezuela (EFE)	2

=== Year-end charts ===
2000 year-end chart performance for "Entre El Mar y una Estrella"
Chart (2000)	Position
Spain (AFYVE)	37
US Hot Latin Songs (Billboard)	15
US Latin Pop Airplay (Billboard)	9

== See also ==
- List of number-one Billboard Hot Latin Tracks of 2000
- List of Billboard Latin Pop Airplay number ones of 2000
- List of Billboard Tropical Airplay number ones of 2000
