= Regresa a mí (Thalía song) =

2000 single by Thalía

Single by Thalía

from the album Arrasando
- Released: 5 May 2000
- Recorded: 2000
- Genre: Latin pop
- Length: 4:28
- Label: EMI Latin
- Songwriter: Thalía Sodi
- Producers: Thalía, Emilio Estefan Jr., Lawrence P. Dermer, Robin Dermer

Thalía singles chronology
"Entre el Mar y una Estrella" (2000)	"Regresa a mí" (2000)	"Arrasando" (2000)

"Regresa a mí" (Spanish for Return to Me) is a song by Thalía, from her album Arrasando. It is her biggest hit to date in European countries like Czech Republic, Slovakia and Poland. As a result of its success, Arrasando was certified platinum in the Czech Republic the song reached number three.

On February 10, 2022, Thalía officially released the music video for the English version of the song, titled "Don't Close The Door."

== Music video ==
The music video was directed by the Colombian director Simon Brand.

=== Official versions and remixes ===
1. "Regresa a mí" (Album Version) – 4:27
2. "Regresa a mí" (Radio Edit) – 3:52
3. "Regresa a mí" (English Versión) – 4:28

== Charts ==
Chart performance for "Regresa a mí"
Chart (2001)	Peak position
Czech Republic (IFPI)	3
Ecuador (El Siglo de Torreón)	8
Guatemala (El Siglo de Torreón)	10
Honduras (El Siglo de Torreón)	6
Panama (El Siglo de Torreón)	4
US Hot Latin Songs (Billboard)	19
US Latin Pop Airplay (Billboard)	12
Venezuela (El Siglo de Torreón)	7
