= Thalía (2002 album) =

Studio album by Thalía
- Released: 21 May 2002
- Recorded: 2001–2002
- Genres: Latin pop; pop rock; dance-pop
- Length: 54:12 (Standard/European version); 57:34 (US version)
- Languages: Spanish; English
- Label: EMI Latin
- Producers: Estéfano; Emilio Estéfan, Jr.; Steve Morales; Cory Rooney; Poke y Tone; Hex Hector & Mac Quayle

Thalía chronology
Thalía con banda: Grandes éxitos (2001)	Thalía (2002)	Thalía's Hits Remixed (2003)

Alternative cover
- European cover artwork

Singles from Thalía
- 1. "Tú y Yo" Released: 12 March 2002; 2. "No me enseñaste" Released: 23 July 2002; 3. "¿A Quién le Importa?" Released: 19 November 2002; 4. "Dance Dance (The Mexican)" Released: 18 March 2003

Thalía is the eighth studio album and second eponymous album by Mexican singer Thalía, released on 21 May 2002, by EMI Latin. The follow-up to her successful sixth studio album, Arrasando (2000), the album sees Thalía collaborating with previous producers Emilio Estéfan, Jr. and Cory Rooney, while working for the first time with Estéfano, Julio C. Reyes and Steve Morales. Thalía incorporates strong elements of pop rock, while also having Latin pop influences. Lyrically, the album touches on themes of self-empowerment and individuality. It also features two covers and a new version of an old Latin classic.

The album received generally positive reviews from music critics, who praised the album and indicating that Thalía has found her sound. Four singles were released from the album: the lead single "Tú y Yo" became a hit in Thalía's music career peaking at number-one on the Billboard's Hot Latin Tracks. The second single "No me enseñaste" was another success on the Hot Latin Tracks chart, while the third single "¿A Quién le Importa?" was another top-ten hit on the same chart. The album went straight to number one, spending six consecutive weeks on Billboard's Top Latin Album Chart and Top Latin Pop Albums. It also reached the top of the Mexican chart and was certified Gold.

== Background and recording ==
In January 2002, Mexican local press reported that Thalía was immersed on the recording process of a new album, which was announced as a "millionaire production" and that it would be released by mid-year. Thalía recorded the album in Miami and New York City, and according to Thalía's spokesperson, the album was going to include pop songs, ballads and some rhythmic parts as well. He claimed: "There will be some surprises. The producers are taking care of every single detail so the album can be perfect. Obviously, Tommy (Mottola) gave her a few orientations, but Thalía has a lot of experience in her job."

In an interview for the newspaper Clarin, Thalía declared that the album was the start of a new phase of expansion that the singer found herself "very productive, evolving, wanting to enjoy it." She also announced that the album was going to have three songs in English, becoming her first to have "a crossover appeal", and that it would be her second self-titled album, the first since her self titled debut album (1990). It was also announced that she was working for the first time with Cory Rooney (who worked with Jennifer Lopez and Destiny's Child), Steve Morales (who produced for Enrique Iglesias) and Estéfano. The singer also worked with previous collaborator Emilio Estéfan, Jr., who launched her into the international market on Amor a la Mexicana (1997).

Estéfano, one of the album's main songwriters, revealed that when the project came into his hands, he was told to write songs in a fresher, more aggressive vein, and he developed a strong rapport with the singer. He claimed: "She surprised me from the beginning. [...] She is far cooler than her TV roles, far nicer and more relaxed, and that's what I wanted to project. I found she had much more of an edge. She's an extremely talented, hard-working girl, and she works with love. I think this will be the most important album of her career. It's a great album." EMI Latin USA president Jorge Pino claimed that Thalía "has such a star quality, and with this album she's found her match. This a deep album - it has five or six singles - the marketing plan is comprehensive, and she's eager to support it to the max."

== Composition ==
"It's been a marvelous personal encounter where it was about simply letting things flow and taking them as they came, without so much starch and fuss. It's not that I'm not doing pop anymore, but the tendency of everyone who worked on the album was to go toward [more rock-oriented] sounds, and it feels incredible."

— Thalía on the album's direction.

Thalía is a collection of ten tracks in Spanish, mostly penned by Colombian songwriter Estéfano, who co-wrote and co-produced several of them with collaborator Julio C. Reyes, and three others in English, which was envisioned as her introduction to that language's market. As noted by Leila Cobo of Billboard, the album "has far more aggressive rock undertones than its namesake's previous material, edgier arrangements that often rely on crunchy guitars, and a generally relaxed feel that belies the nine months of work that went into it." She also stated that Thalía "is a gutsy album, flush with personality and hooks." Joey Guerra noted that lyrically, the album "has a lock on independent-woman anthems," which he said that "[i]t's a familiar ground for Thalia, who explored similar themes on 1997's Amor a la Mexicana and 1999's Arrasando." The opening track, "Tú y Yo", was considered a "guitar-based pop rock track," while "Así Es el Destino" talks about destiny and how two people are meant to be. "En la Fiesta Mando Yo" was considered a dance and ska-tinged track, with accordion accompaniment, about girl-power, while "No me enseñaste" was defined as a sentimental rock ballad that "highlights a voice with range and pathos."

The fifth track, "Y Seguir", is another ballad, and was conceived after a long conversation in which Thalía told Estéfano that in love, one leaves pieces of oneself behind, only to have to turn around, pick those pieces up, and go on." The sixth track "¿A Quién le Importa?" is a cover of Alaska y Dinarama's 1986 hit and lyrically is "a devil-may-care ode to individuality." Thalía commented that the song reflected what she was going through at the time and called it "an anthem of freedom." "Vueltas en el Aire" was named a "glittering [song] destined to fill dance floors," while "Heridas en el Alma" talks about the fear of not overcoming someone. "La Loca" is a "smorgasbord of rock, cumbia, and rap rhythms, having Los Rabanes lead singer Emilio Regueira rapping. The album also features two versions of the song "The Mexican 2002", a remake of the song "The Mexican", one in Spanish and other in English, with the former featuring background vocals by Marc Anthony. It also features a "yearning ballad" in English, "Closer to You", and another cover: a dance version of Dead or Alive's hit "You Spin Me Round (Like a Record)", which was noted for Thalía "purring like a sex kitten." In some editions, a grupera version of "Tú y Yo" featuring Kumbia Kings was included, as well as an acoustic version.

== Promotion ==
=== Singles ===
"Tú y Yo" was released on 12 March 2002 as the album's lead single. It became a huge success on the US Hot Latin Songs, reaching number-one, and also reached number four on the Latin Pop Songs. It also reached number-one in Argentina and Colombia. The song was also Thalía's first song to enter the Swiss Music Charts at number 63. She heavily promoted the song in a number of places, including the 2002 Latin Billboard Music Awards. The second single, "No Me Enseñaste", was released in July 2002, and it was also another success, reaching the top of the Hot Latin Songs and number three on the Latin Pop Songs. Thalía performed the song on the Latin Grammy Awards of 2002. The third single, "¿A Quién Le Importa?", was released in November 2002, and it was another top-ten on the Hot Latin Songs and Latin Pop Songs. She performed the song on the 2003 Latin Billboard Music Awards and the Latin Grammy Awards of 2003. "Dance Dance (The Mexican)" was released to US club stations in February 2003 as the album's fourth single and reached number six on the Dance Music/Club Play Singles.

== Critical reception ==
Professional ratings
Review scores
Source	Rating
AllMusic	4/5 stars
Billboard	(positive)
Joey Guerra (Amazon)	(favorable)

Thalía received generally positive reviews from music critics. AllMusic editor Jason Birchmeier gave the album a four-out-of-five-stars rating, calling it "a buffet of delights -- finely prepared pop songs of all types, each with its own flavor and appeal, some tastier than others, sure, but practically all of them delectable. [...] It's an album that's as much the result of Estéfano's songwriting genius as it is Thalía's unmatched appeal. It does sound a little dated in hindsight -- closely tied to the production trends of its time, too closely perhaps -- but not nearly to the extent of Arrasando. A touchstone Latin pop album, no question, Thalia is also one of Estéfano's crowning achievements." Billboard's Leila Cobo was also positive, noting that on the album, "Thalía brings forth a new sound that aims to be earthier, edgier, and far more rock-driven than her previous, more dulcified pop. That said, Thalía is pop, but of the most satisfactory kind, aided by excellent songs (most written by Estéfano); interesting, organic arrangements; and Thalía's distinctive (if sometimes affected) vocals." Cobo also declared that " she's found her voice and her material." In a retrospective commentary, Jessica Rolz from the same magazine, described that the album showcased her "versatility to sing in both Spanish and English, while exploring with rock, pop, and ballads". Joey Guerra wrote that "[t]his new set is not as instantly addictive, but it showcases Thalia's continued evolution as an artist. [...] If she keeps it up, we'll all soon be a slave for a new kind of diva."

== Commercial performance ==
Thalía debuted at number 126 on the Billboard 200, while it reached the top of the Top Latin Albums and the Latin Pop Albums. It fell to number 148 the following week on the Billboard 200, but it remained at the top of the Top Latin Albums and the Latin Pop Albums for further five weeks, becoming her longest-leading title with six consecutive weeks at the top of the Latin Pop charts. As of January 2004, the album had sales of 179,000 units according to Nielsen SoundScan. According to Billboard, Thalía received multiple certifications for its sales in the United States and Latin America.

Elsewhere, the album peaked the number one in Thalía's home country, Mexico, and sold 170,000 units as of November 2002. Across Europe, the album also peaked at number one in Greece, the number 9 on Czech Albums chart, and 22nd spot on Spanish charts. In Switzerland, Thalía was her second record to chart in the country, becoming her highest charting album, peaking at number thirty, and spending ten weeks on the chart.

== Accolades ==
Thalía won the 2003 Latin Billboard Music Awards for "Best Female Latin Pop Album". She was also nominated for Best Female Latin Pop Airplay Track for "No Me Enseñaste" and Best Female Tropical/Salsa Airplay Track for the tropical version of "No Me Esenãste". The album was also nominated for Best Female Pop Vocal Album on the Latin Grammy Awards of 2003. In 2004, "¿A Quién Le Importa?" was nominated for Best Female Latin Pop Airplay Track on the 2004 Latin Billboard Music Awards, while "Dance Dance (The Mexican)" won the International Dance Music Awards on the category "Best Latin Dance Track". In About.com's list of her "Ten Best Songs", "Tú y Yo", "No Me Ensenãste" and "¿A Quién Le Importa?" were included, with Carlos Quintana acknowledging that the album is "one of the most celebrated works of her discography." [...] "That said, if you want to get an album from the Mexican singer, this is definitely the title you need to get."

== Track listing ==
Standard edition
No.	Title	Lyrics	Music	Producer(s)	Length
1.	"Tú y Yo"	Estéfano	Estéfano; Julio C. Reyes	Estéfano	3:43
2.	"Así Es El Destino"	Estéfano	Estéfano; Reyes	Estéfano	4:02
3.	"En la Fiesta Mando Yo"	Estéfano	Estéfano; Reyes	Estéfano	4:18
4.	"No me enseñaste"	Estéfano	Estéfano; Reyes	Estéfano	4:29
5.	"Y Seguir"	Estéfano	Estéfano; Reyes	Estéfano	4:04
6.	"¿A Quién le Importa?"	Carlos Berlanga; Nacho Canut	Berlanga; Canut	Estéfano	3:45
7.	"Vueltas En El Aire"	Estéfano	Estéfano; Reyes	Estéfano	5:02
8.	"Heridas En El Alma"	Estéfano	Estéfano; Cory Rooney	Estéfano; Roney^{[a]}	3:46
9.	"La Loca"	Emilio Estéfan, Jr.; Emilio Regueira Pérez; Randall Barlow	Estéfan, Jr.; Pérez; Barlow	Estéfan, Jr.; Barlow	3:50
10.	"The Mexican 2002" (Spanish version) (featuring Marc Anthony)	Thalía	JC Olivier; S. Barnes; Rooney; Alan Shacklock	Poke y Tone; Rooney; Steve Morales^{[a]}	3:53
11.	"The Mexican 2002" (English version)	Rooney	Olivier; Barnes; Rooney; Shacklock	Poke y Tone; Rooney; Morales^{[a]}	3:52
12.	"Closer To You"	Thalía; Morales; David Siegel; Gerina Di Marco	Morales	Morales	3:48
13.	"You Spin Me 'Round"	Pete Burns; Steve Coy; Tim Lever; Mike Percy	Burns; Coy; Lever; Percy	Morales; Hex Hector & Mac Quayle	4:33

USA edition
No.	Title	Lyrics	Music	Producer(s)	Length
1.	"Tú y Yo"	Estéfano	Estéfano; Julio C. Reyes	Estéfano	3:43
2.	"Así Es El Destino"	Estéfano	Estéfano; Reyes	Estéfano	4:02
3.	"En la Fiesta Mando Yo"	Estéfano	Estéfano; Reyes	Estéfano	4:18
4.	"No me enseñaste"	Estéfano	Estéfano; Reyes	Estéfano	4:29
5.	"Y Seguir"	Estéfano	Estéfano; Reyes	Estéfano	4:04
6.	"¿A Quién le Importa?"	Carlos Berlanga; Nacho Canut	Berlanga; Canut	Estéfano	3:45
7.	"Vueltas En El Aire"	Estéfano	Estéfano; Reyes	Estéfano	5:02
8.	"Heridas En El Alma"	Estéfano	Estéfano; Cory Rooney	Estéfano; Roney^{[a]}	3:46
9.	"La Loca"	Emilio Estéfan, Jr.; Emilio Regueira Pérez; Randall Barlow	Estéfan, Jr.; Pérez; Barlow	Estéfan, Jr.; Barlow	3:50
10.	"Tú y Yo" (Cumbia Remix) (featuring A.B. Quintanilla & Kumbia Kings)	Estéfano	Estéfano; Reyes	Estéfano	3:51
11.	"The Mexican 2002" (Spanish version) (featuring Marc Anthony)	Thalía	JC Olivier; S. Barnes; Rooney; Alan Shacklock	Poke y Tone; Rooney; Steve Morales^{[a]}	3:53
12.	"The Mexican 2002" (English version)	Rooney	Olivier; Barnes; Rooney; Shacklock	Poke y Tone; Rooney; Morales^{[a]}	3:52
13.	"Closer To You"	Thalía; Morales; David Siegel; Gerina Di Marco	Morales	Morales	3:48
14.	"You Spin Me 'Round"	Pete Burns; Steve Coy; Tim Lever; Mike Percy	Burns; Coy; Lever; Percy	Morales; Hex Hector & Mac Quayle	4:33
15.	"Message (Hidden Track)"				0:15

European edition
No.	Title	Lyrics	Music	Producer(s)	Length
1.	"Tú y Yo"	Estéfano	Estéfano; Julio C. Reyes	Estéfano	3:43
2.	"Así Es El Destino"	Estéfano	Estéfano; Reyes	Estéfano	4:02
3.	"En la Fiesta Mando Yo"	Estéfano	Estéfano; Reyes	Estéfano	4:18
4.	"No me enseñaste"	Estéfano	Estéfano; Reyes	Estéfano	4:29
5.	"Y Seguir"	Estéfano	Estéfano; Reyes	Estéfano	4:04
6.	"¿A Quién le Importa?"	Carlos Berlanga; Nacho Canut	Berlanga; Canut	Estéfano	3:45
7.	"Vueltas En El Aire"	Estéfano	Estéfano; Reyes	Estéfano	5:02
8.	"Heridas En El Alma"	Estéfano	Estéfano; Cory Rooney	Estéfano; Roney^{[a]}	3:46
9.	"La Loca"	Emilio Estéfan, Jr.; Emilio Regueira Pérez; Randall Barlow	Estéfan, Jr.; Pérez; Barlow	Estéfan, Jr.; Barlow	3:50
10.	"The Mexican 2002" (Spanish version) (featuring Marc Anthony)	Thalía	JC Olivier; S. Barnes; Rooney; Alan Shacklock	Poke y Tone; Rooney; Steve Morales^{[a]}	3:53
11.	"The Mexican 2002" (English version)	Rooney	Olivier; Barnes; Rooney; Shacklock	Poke y Tone; Rooney; Morales^{[a]}	3:52
12.	"Closer To You"	Thalía; Morales; David Siegel; Gerina Di Marco	Morales	Morales	3:48
13.	"You Spin Me 'Round"	Pete Burns; Steve Coy; Tim Lever; Mike Percy	Burns; Coy; Lever; Percy	Morales; Hex Hector; Mac Quayle	4:33
14.	"Message (Hidden Track)"				0:15

Remastered edition (US only)
No.	Title	Lyrics	Music	Production	Length
1.	"Tú y Yo"	Estéfano	Estéfano; Julio C. Reyes	Estéfano	3:43
2.	"Así Es El Destino"	Estéfano	Estéfano; Reyes	Estéfano	4:02
3.	"En la Fiesta Mando Yo"	Estéfano	Estéfano; Reyes	Estéfano	4:18
4.	"No me enseñaste"	Estéfano	Estéfano; Reyes	Estéfano	4:29
5.	"Y Seguir"	Estéfano	Estéfano; Reyes	Estéfano	4:04
6.	"¿A Quién le Importa?"	Carlos Berlanga; Nacho Canut	Berlanga; Canut	Estéfano	3:45
7.	"Vueltas En El Aire"	Estéfano	Estéfano; Reyes	Estéfano	5:02
8.	"Heridas En El Alma"	Estéfano	Estéfano; Cory Rooney	Estéfano; Roney^{[a]}	3:46
9.	"La Loca"	Emilio Estéfan, Jr.; Emilio Regueira Pérez; Randall Barlow	Estéfan, Jr.; Pérez; Barlow	Estéfan, Jr.; Barlow	3:50
10.	"Tú y Yo" (Cumbia Remix) (featuring A.B. Quintanilla & Kumbia Kings)	Estéfano	Estéfano; Reyes	Estéfano	3:51
11.	"The Mexican 2002" (Spanish version) (featuring Marc Anthony)	Thalía	JC Olivier; S. Barnes; Rooney; Alan Shacklock	Poke y Tone; Rooney; Steve Morales^{[a]}	3:53
12.	"The Mexican 2002" (English version)	Rooney	Olivier; Barnes; Rooney; Shacklock	Poke y Tone; Rooney; Morales^{[a]}	3:52
13.	"Closer To You"	Thalía; Morales; David Siegel; Gerina Di Marco	Morales	Morales	3:48
14.	"You Spin Me 'Round"	Pete Burns; Steve Coy; Tim Lever; Mike Percy	Burns; Coy; Lever; Percy	Morales; Hex Hector & Mac Quayle	4:33
15.	"No Me Enseñaste" (Salsa Remix)	Estéfano	Estéfano; Reyes	Estéfano	4:31
16.	"Tú Y Yo" (Ballad Version)	Estéfano	Estéfano; Reyes	Estéfano	3:30
17.	"The Mexican (Dance Dance)" (Hex Hector & Mac Quayle Radio Remix)	Thalía	Olivier; Barnes; Rooney; Alan Shacklock	Poke y Tone; Rooney; Morales^{[a]}	3:27
18.	"No Me Enseñaste" (Estéfano Remix)	Estéfano	Estéfano; Reyes	Estéfano	4:15

- ^{^a} signifies an additional producer
- "¿A Quién Le Importa?" is a cover of the song of the same name by Alaska y Dinarama.
- "The Mexican 2002" samples the song "The Mexican" by Jellybean.
- "You Spin Me 'Round" is a cover of the song "You Spin Me Round (Like a Record)" by Dead or Alive.

== Charts ==
=== Weekly charts ===
Chart (2002)	Peak position
Czech Albums (ČNS IFPI)	9
Greek International Albums (IFPI Greece)	1
Mexican Albums (AMPROFON)	1
Spanish Albums (PROMUSICAE)	22
Swiss Albums (Swiss Hitparade)	30
US Billboard 200	126
US Latin Pop Albums (Billboard)	1
US Top Heatseekers Albums	4
US Top Latin Albums (Billboard)	1

=== Year-end charts ===
Chart (2002)	Peak position
US Billboard Latin Albums	14
US Billboard Latin Pop Albums	9

Chart (2003)	Peak position
US Billboard Latin Albums	37
US Latin Pop Albums (Billboard)	16

=== Decade-end charts ===
2000s decade-end chart performance for "Thalía"
Chart (2000–2009)	Position
US Latin Albums (Billboard)	93

== Certifications and sales ==
Region	Certification	Certified units/sales
Argentina	Gold	
Mexico	—	170,000
Puerto Rico	Platinum	
Spain (Promusicae)	Gold	50,000^{^}
United States (RIAA)	2× Platinum (Latin)	200,000^{^}
^{^} Shipments figures based on certification alone.

== Release history ==
Country	Date	Version	Format	Label	Ref.
United States	21 May 2002	Standard; Deluxe	CD; digital download	EMI Latin	
Mexico	21 May 2002	Standard; Deluxe	CD; digital download	EMI Latin	
Brazil	21 May 2002	Standard; Deluxe	CD; digital download	EMI Latin	
United Kingdom	21 May 2002	Standard; Deluxe	CD; digital download	EMI Latin	
Germany	1 July 2002	New version	CD; digital download	EMI	
Japan	10 July 2002	Standard	CD; digital download	EMI	
France	29 July 2002	New version	CD; digital download	Virgin	
Worldwide	3 March 2003	New version	CD; digital download	EMI Latin	
United States	27 September 2005	Reissue	CD; digital download	EMI Latin	
