= Latina Love Tour =

2016 concert tour by Thalia

- Tour by Thalía
- Associated album: Latina
- Start date: September 23, 2016
- End date: October 18, 2016
- Legs: 1
- No. of shows: 6 in United States, 3 in Mexico
- Box office: TBA

Thalía concert chronology
- The VIVA! Tour (2013); Latina Love Tour (2016)

The Latina Love Tour was the sixth concert tour by Mexican recording artist Thalía in support of her 2016 album Latina. This album had a huge commercial impact in all over Latin America and the United States. It was also Thalía's first tour in three years, following the 2013 The VIVA! Tour. The tour started in New Jersey on September 23, 2016 and concluded on October 18 at the National Auditorium in Mexico City.

== Broadcast and recordings ==
On October 10, 2016, Thalía announced through her social medias that she will release a documentary film about her Latina Love tour.

== Set list ==
United States
1. "Video Intro" (contains elements from "Acción y Reacción", "Reencarnación", "Amor a la Mexicana", "Noches sin luna", and "El día del amor")
2. "Amor a la Mexicana"
3. "Te Perdiste Mi Amor"
4. "No No No"
5. "El Próximo Viernes"
6. "Gracias a Dios"
7. "Insensible"
8. "Más"
9. "En silencio" (Video Interlude)
10. "Por Lo Que Resta de Vida"
11. "¿Qué Será de Ti?"
12. "Equívocada"
13. "Habítame Siempre"
14. "Te encontrare" (Video Interlude)
15. "La Movidita"
16. "Todavia Te Quiero"
17. "De Ti"
18. "Medley" (Telenovelas)
  1. "Rosalinda"
  2. "Marimar"
  3. "María la del Barrio"
19. "Frutas"
20. "Gracias" (Video Interlude)
21. "Entre El Mar y Una Estrella"
22. "Tiki tiki ta"
23. "Medley"
  1. "Tú y Yo"
  2. "No Me Enseñaste"
  3. "Seducción"
  4. "Piel Morena"
24. "Desde Esa Noche"

Encore

21. "¿A Quién Le Importa?"
22. "Arrasando"

Sources :

Mexico
1. "Video Intro" (contains elements from "Acción y Reacción", "Reencarnación", "Amor a la Mexicana", "Noches sin luna", and "El día del amor")
2. "Love"
3. "Medley" (Retro)
  1. "Un Pacto entre los Dos"
  2. "Amándote"
  3. "En la Intimidad"
  4. "Fuego cruzado"
  5. "Sangre"
  6. "Pienso en ti"
  7. "Amarillo azul"
4. "Gracias a Dios"
5. "Insensible"
6. "Amore mio"
7. "Más"
8. "En silencio" (Video Interlude)
9. "Por Lo Que Resta de Vida"
10. "¿Qué Será de Ti?"
11. "Equívocada"
12. "Habítame Siempre"
13. "Te encontrare" (Video Interlude)
14. "Pena negra"
15. "La Movidita"
16. "Todavia Te Quiero"
17. "De Ti"
18. "Medley" (Telenovelas)
  1. "Rosalinda"
  2. "Marimar"
  3. "María la del Barrio"
19. "Frutas"
20. "Gracias" (Video Interlude)
21. "Entre El Mar y Una Estrella"
22. "Tiki tiki ta"
23. "Medley"
  1. "Tú y Yo"
  2. "No Me Enseñaste"
  3. "Seducción"
  4. "Piel Morena"
24. "Amor a la mexicana"
25. "Desde Esa Noche"

Encore

21. "¿A Quién Le Importa?"
22. "Arrasando"

Additional Set list Information
- During the performances in New Jersey, New York, and Miami, Thalía performed the song "Todo" and remixed versions of "Vuélveme a Querer" and "Entre el mar y una Estrella".
- During the concert in New York, Thalía was joined on stage by Fat Joe to perform "I Want You". Later that night, Chiky Bom Bom "La Pantera" joined Thalía on stage to perform "Frutas".
- During the performance in Miami, Thalía was joined on stage by Jacob Forever to perform "Todo".
- During the performance in Monterrey, actor and singer Pedro Fernández joined Thalía on stage to perform "De ti". Also, the concert set list changed considerably as Thalía included "Amore mio" and a medley of her earlier 90's hits on reworked versions as opening performance. The song "Amor a la Mexicana" was performed before "Desde esta Noche".
- During the last concert in Mexico City, Thalía included a video interlude of her former teen band Timbiriche. After that, Erik Rubín, Benny Ibarra and Sasha Sokol,as their bandmates, joined Thalía on stage to perform "Junto a ti" and "Si no es ahora". Later that night, Mexican tropical music orchestra Sonora Santanera joined Thalía on stage to perform "Pena negra" and "Enemigos". Also, a video interlude of "Menta y canela" was included. The songs "Frutas" and "Tiki tiki ta" were not performed.

== Tour dates ==
Date	City	Country	Venue
North America
September 23, 2016	New Brunswick	United States	State Theatre
September 28, 2016	New York City	United States	Beacon Theatre
September 30, 2016	Miami	United States	Adrienne Arsht Center
October 3, 2016	Houston	United States	Revention Music Center
October 4, 2016	Dallas	United States	Majestic Theatre
October 8, 2016	Los Angeles	United States	Dolby Theatre
October 15, 2016	Monterrey	Mexico	Auditorio Banamex
October 17, 2016	Mexico City	Mexico	National Auditorium
October 18, 2016	Mexico City	Mexico	National Auditorium
