= Reencarnación =

2000 single by Thalía

Single by Thalía

from the album Arrasando
- Released: 9 April 2001
- Recorded: 2000
- Genre: Latin pop
- Length: 5.04
- Label: EMI Latin
- Songwriters: Thalía, Lawrence P. Dermer, Robi Rosa
- Producers: Thalía, Emilio Estefan, Lawrence P. Dermer

Thalía singles chronology
| "Arrasando" (2000) | "Reencarnación" (2001) | "Rosalinda" (2001) |

"Reencarnación" (Reincarnation) is a song by Thalía, released as the fourth single from her album Arrasando. It was a hit single throughout Latin America. Its music video was also a hit. To promote the song she appeared in various TV shows to sing the song. Reencarnacion is a powerful Latin dance song.

== History ==
Reencarnación talks about a love that lasts through eternity. She states that even though she and her love keep meeting through various lifetimes, she doesn't want to fall in love again. The song features middle eastern samples. Lyrics was written by Thalía.

== Video ==
Reencarnación was directed by: Emilio Estefan Jr

== Single ==
1. Reencarnación (Radio Edit) - 3:53

== Charts ==
| Chart (2001) | Peak position |
|---|---|
| US Hot Latin Songs (Billboard) | 30 |
| US Latin Pop Airplay (Billboard) | 17 |
