= El comienzo de la Historia =

Compilation album by Thalía
- Released: 2009
- Recorded: 1990–1991
- Genre: Pop
- Label: Universal

Thalía chronology
'Combo de Exitos: Somos la Historia' (2006)	''El comienzo de la Historia'' (2009)

El comienzo de la Historia is a Greatest Hits compilation by Mexican pop star Thalía. It comprises ten tracks taken from her first two albums, both of which are now out of print.

== Background and reception ==
Professional ratings
Review scores
Source	Rating
AllMusic	5/5 stars

The album consists of songs from Thalía's first two studio albums. The album was well received by the public. The album was also among the Best Sellers Rank on Amazon in the CDs & Vinyl in the general category, Latin Pop category, Dance Pop category, and Banda category with the latter being its highest ranking at number 75.

== Track listing ==
1. "Pienso en ti"
2. "Saliva"
3. "Un pacto entre los dos"
4. "Te necesito"
5. "Fuego cruzado"
6. "Mundo de cristal"
7. "En la intimidad"
8. "Me matas"
9. "El poder de tu amor"
10. "Amarillo azul"
