= Arrasando =

Studio album by Thalía
- Released: 25 April 2000
- Recorded: 1999–2000
- Studio: Crescent Moon Studios (Miami, Florida)
- Genre: Latin pop; dance-pop; techno
- Length: 48:32
- Label: EMI Latin
- Producer: Emilio Estefan, Jr.; Thalía; Roberto Blades; Lawrence Dermer; Kike Santander

Thalía chronology
Amor a la Mexicana (1997)	Arrasando (2000)	Thalía con banda: Grandes éxitos (2001)

Singles from Arrasando
- 1. "Entre el mar y una estrella" Released: 28 March 2000; 2. "Regresa a mí" Released: 9 May 2000; 3. "Arrasando" / "It's My Party" Released: 22 August 2000; 4. "Menta Y Canela" (World) / Pata Pata (Argentina)" Released: 9 January 2001; 5. "Reencarnación" Released: 10 April 2001; 6. "Rosalinda" Released: 15 May 2001

Arrasando (English: Razing) is the seventh studio album by Mexican singer Thalía, released on 25 April 2000, by EMI Latin. She collaborated with producers like Emilio Estefan, Roberto Blades and Lawrence Dermer. In many interviews during the album launch, Thalía said that this album was different from her previous ones, because it shows her turn to a more dance/techno-influenced sound, describing it as a fusion between many types of music. Thalía co-wrote eight songs on the album, in addition, it includes two covers: the South African hit "Pata Pata" and Gloria Estefan's "Lucky Girl".

The album received positive reviews and achieved two nominations at the Latin Grammy Awards of 2001 for Female Pop Vocal Album and Best Engineered Album, winning the latter one. Arrasando was also nominated for Pop Album of the Year at the Lo Nuestro Awards of 2001. Upon release, the album topped the record charts of Czech Republic, Greece, Slovakia and Billboard's Latin Pop Albums, while reaching the top five on Billboard's Top Latin Albums, Spain and Hungary. Arrasando remains one of the best-selling Spanish-language albums, with over 2 million copies worldwide as of September 2001.

In 2025, to mark the album's 25th anniversary, a remastered edition was released on streaming services and digital stores, along with two other albums by the singer, En Éxtasis and El Sexto Sentido.

== Background and recording ==
In 1997, Thalía released her fifth studio album, Amor a la Mexicana, which was certified 2× Platinum in Argentina, Chile, Spain and the United States. Later, she starred the Mexican telenovela Rosalinda, in 1999. During this time, the singer started recording her sixth album, claiming that, "she wanted to prepare a quality product, so it took almost a year to make it. It's true that it took a while but it worth the wait, because it comes as the album title says, 'triumphing' strongly internationally". For the album, Thalía wrote eight tracks, with the help of other songwriters, such as Kike Santander and Roberto Blades, whilst Emilio Estefan Jr. produced the album. EMI Latin's press manager Rosario Valeriano claimed that, "All we know is that Mr. Stefan trusted Thalía, when it comes to writing her own music, and this shows that aside from singing very well, she can also show how good she is on the writing part". In order to promote Arrasando, Thalía visited several countries in the Americas, Europe and Asia.

== Composition ==
In Arrasando, Thalia experiments with different music genres, besides the traditional latin pop, the album also takes large influence on dance-pop and rap. Lyrically, it is an album that deals with her own life experiences. EMI's press manager claimed that, "This album, which has 12 tracks, will supply everyone's needs, because it has Latin tracks, such as the Brazilian batucada, and others that they will enjoy." He further added, "Something that people will like is a song in the vein of Cher, where Thalia does an excellent job. Actually, this song and the other ones have different styles." Thalia herself commented about the album's multiple styles, saying, "My music has always been Latin pop, but in this record it has a dance vibe, a little bit of rap and R&B, in a way that they blend perfectly."

The album opens with the slow ballad "Entre el mar y una estrella" ("Between the Sea and a Star"), which was praised by critics, who called it a "majestic" song. "Regresa a mí" ("Come Back to Me") follows, with its dance-pop style and Thalia's autotuned vocals, while the third track "Reencarnación" ("Reincarnation"), co-written by Draco Rosa, is a heavily dance-inspired track about reincarnation. The fourth and title track, the techno-infused "Arrasando" ("Razing"), was considered "tailor-made for peak-hour club play". The fifth track is the soothing "No Hay Que Llorar" ("There's no Need to Cry"), while "Tumba la Casa" follows the high-energy style of previous songs. The album also recorded a version of Miriam Makeba's hit "Pata Pata", while the closing track, "Rosalinda", the theme song of Thalía's soap opera of the same name, being the most traditionally Mexican song on the set.

== Promotion ==
=== Singles ===
The album's lead-single "Entre el mar y una estrella" was released on 28 March 2000. The ballad became a success on the chart, peaking at number-one on the Hot Latin Tracks, Latin Pop Airplay and Latin Tropical/Salsa Airplay charts. The album's second single "Regresa a mí" peaked moderately on the charts in the US, on the Hot Latin Tracks, it peaked at number 19, on the Latin Pop Airplay, it peaked at number 12. In Mexico the song topped the charts. The third single, the title track "Arrasando", only went to peak at number 25 on the US Latin Pop Airplay chart but again, it was another number one single in Mexico. A version in English, called "It's My Party", was also released. "Menta Y Canela" was released as the fourth single in countries like Mexico and Brazil, while "Pata Pata" was released only in Argentina.

The album's fifth single "Reencarnación" fared a little better, peaking at number 30 on the Hot Latin Tracks and number 17 on the Latin Pop Airplay. The sixth single, "Rosalinda", charted on the Hot Latin Tracks at number 46, on the Latin Pop Airplay at number 23 and on the Latin Tropical/Salsa Airplay at number 37.

== Critical reception ==
Professional ratings
Review scores
Source	Rating
AllMusic	3.5/5 stars
Amazon.com	positive

The album received mainly positive reviews from music critics. Jason Birchmeier of Allmusic gave the album a rating of 3.5. out of 5 stars, claiming that Arrasando, "firmly established her as a full-fledged superstar in 2000," calling the album "a trendy one, very much of its time – that is, right at the turn of the millennium, when high-intensity, trancy dance music was all the rage in fashionable circles." Birchemeier also noted the "abundance of synthesizers and dance beats, as well as its ecstatic choruses, which seem to reach for the stars song after song." He also noted that "it certainly differs from its predecessor (Amor a la Mexicana) and successor (Thalia). All are among her best efforts, with Arrasando being probably the most contrived. It's more adventurous than the streamlined Thalia, yet it's not as free-flowing as Amor a la Mexicana. Of the three, it surely sounds the most dated, and for all these reasons, it's a strangely curious album, very evocative of its time."

Joey Guerra wrote for Amazon.com that the album is "the singer's most focused collection to date", where "Thalia and Estefan blend salsa, rap, reggae, cumbia, and aggressive club beats into one irresistible mix." Guerra called the songs "Regresa a Mi", "Pata Pata", and "Siempre Hay Carino" "infectious", claiming that "Thalia proves equally adept at ballads, particularly on the majestic first single, 'Entre el Mar y una Estrella'."

In the Billboard special feature, critics Sigal Ratner-Arias, Isabela Raygoza, and Jessica Roiz emphasize that Arrasando marked a turning point in Thalía's career, ushering in the new millennium with bold and diverse sounds. The authors highlight how the album successfully blended "emotive ballads, dancefloor anthems, and sonic experimentation" into one body of work, bringing together fusions that were still uncommon in 2000, such as pop with R&B, techno, and Latin rhythms. Revisiting each track, they note that songs like "Entre el Mar y una Estrella" retain their "magic even after 25 years", while "Arrasando" is remembered as one of her "most defining party songs", mixing mambo, rap, and electronic beats. Tracks such as "Reencarnación" are described as a "triumphant celebration of renewal", whereas "Rosalinda" demonstrates the artist's ability to connect music with television drama. For the journalists, the album reflects not only Thalía's versatility as a performer and songwriter but also her pioneering role in exploring musical fusions that would later become staples of Latin pop.

== Commercial performance ==
According to Billboard, Thalía received multiple certifications for its sales in the United States and Latin American. The album shifted 400,000 worldwide units in two days, according to La Nación, also noting a well-received reception in musical markets such as Mexico, Brazil and Argentina. By June 2000, Billboard's Larry Flick said that EMI reported worldwide sales of 600,000 copies. Worldwide sales stand between 1.5 and 2 million copies.

In the United States, Arrasando debuted at number-one on the Latin Pop Albums chart and number 4 on the Top Latin Albums chart; both component of Billboard charts. The album was certified 2× Platinum (Latin) by the Recording Industry Association of America (RIAA), for selling over 200,000 copies in the U.S. In Mexico, the record sold 151,892 after its first six months, in October 2000. Actual sales stand at 250,000 in the region, as of April 2001.

In Europe, the album reached the number 60 on the European Top 100 Albums. Arrasando sold 100,000 copies in its first 15 days in Spain, obtaining a certification of Platinum by PROMUSICAE. It was later certified with 4× Platinum in the region, for shipments of 400,000 units. Arrasando topped the album charts of Czech Republic, and its singles received strong airplay rotation. It also topped the album charts of Greece and Slovakia, while reached the top five in Hungary, and 41 in Switzerland.

== Impact ==
Laura Gomez from Billboard Colombia, stated Arrasando established Thalía as one of the most influential Latin pop artists of the era, paving the way for future artists who would seek to blend different styles in their music. She noted artists such as Karol G and Danna Paola have cited Arrasando as an influence in their careers. According to the journal Vértigo: análisis y pensamiento de México (2001), the album allowed Thalía to enter commercially for her first time in markets such as Canada, Italy, Switzerland, Turkey, Lithuania, the Arab world, and Japan (where it stated she became the first Hispanic women artist to do it).

=== Accolades ===
Arrasando was nominated for two Latin Grammy Awards of 2001, one in Best Female Pop Vocal Album (losing to Christina Aguilera's debut Spanish album Mi Reflejo) and "Best Engineered Album" (which it won). It was also nominated for Pop Album of the Year at the Lo Nuestro Awards of 2001, losing to Paulina by fellow Mexican singer Paulina Rubio. It won the Best Pop Album by a Female Artist in New York's awards, Globo in 2000.

== Track listing ==
=== Standard edition ===
No.	Title	Lyrics	Music	Length
1.	"Entre el mar y una estrella"	Marco Flores	Marco Flores	3:44
2.	"Regresa a mí"	Thalía	Angie Chirino · Emilio Estefan · Lawrence Dermer · Robin Dermer	4:28
3.	"Reencarnación"	Thalía	Lawrence Dermer · Robi Draco Rosa	5:03
4.	"Arrasando"	Thalía	Thalía · Emilio Estefan · Lawrence Dermer · Robin Dermer	3:59
5.	"No Hay que Llorar"	Thalía	Lawrence Dermer	3:39
6.	"Quiero Amarte"	Thalía	Lawrence Dermer · Robin Dermer	3:30
7.	"Suerte en Mí"	Thalía	Emilio Estefan · Lawrence Dermer	4:15
8.	"Menta y Canela"	Thalía	Pérez Prado	3:47
9.	"Tumba la Casa"	Thalía	Thalía · Lawrence Dermer · Luis Tineo · Norberto Cotto	4:26
10.	"Pata Pata"	Edgardo Franco	Miriam Makeba · Jerry Ragovoy	4:39
11.	"Siempre Hay Cariño"	Angie Chirino · Emilio Estefan · Roberto Blades	Angie Chirino · Emilio Estefan · Roberto Blades	3:10
12.	"Rosalinda"	Kike Santander	Kike Santander	3:52

Re-release edition
No.	Title	Length
13.	"Arrasando" (Versión Banda)	3:58
14.	"Entre el Mar y una Estrella" (Pablo Flores Club Mix)	10:50
15.	"Entre el Mar y una Estrella/Arrasando" (Medley)	4:04

- "Suerte en Mí" is a Spanish version of Gloria Estefan's "Lucky Girl" from her album Gloria!.

== Charts ==
=== Weekly charts ===
Chart (2000)	Peak position
Argentina (CAPIF)	7
Czech Albums (ČNS IFPI)	1
European Albums (Music & Media)	60
Greek Albums (IFPI Greece)	1
Hungarian Albums (MAHASZ)	5
Slovak Albums (ČNS IFPI)	1
Spanish Albums (PROMUSICAE)	3
Swiss Albums (Schweizer Hitparade)	41
US Top Latin Albums (Billboard)	4
US Latin Pop Albums (Billboard)	1
US Top Heatseekers Albums (Billboard)	26

=== Year-end charts ===
Chart (2000)	Peak position
Hungarian Albums (MAHASZ)	25
Spanish Albums (PROMUSICAE)	41
US Top Latin Albums (Billboard)	28
US Latin Pop Albums (Billboard)	15

Chart (2001)	Peak position
US Top Latin Albums (Billboard)	23
US Latin Pop Albums (Billboard)	14

== Certifications and sales ==
Region	Certification	Certified units/sales
Argentina (CAPIF)	Platinum	60,000^{^}
Chile	2× Gold	20,000
Colombia	Gold	
Czech Republic	—	15,000
El Salvador	Platinum	
Greece	Gold	
Hungary (MAHASZ)	Platinum	
Mexico (AMPROFON)	Platinum	250,000
Perú	Platinum	
Philippines	Platinum	
Portugal	Gold	
Puerto Rico	Platinum	
Slovakia	Platinum	15,000
Spain (Promusicae)	4× Platinum	400,000^{^}
United States (RIAA)	2× Platinum (Latin)	240,000
Uruguay (CUD)	Gold	3,000^{^}
Venezuela	Gold	
Summaries
Central America (CFC)	Gold	
Worldwide	—	2,000,000
^{^} Shipments figures based on certification alone.

== See also ==
- List of best-selling Latin albums
