= El Siglo de Torreón =

Daily paper in the Comarca Lagunera, Mexico

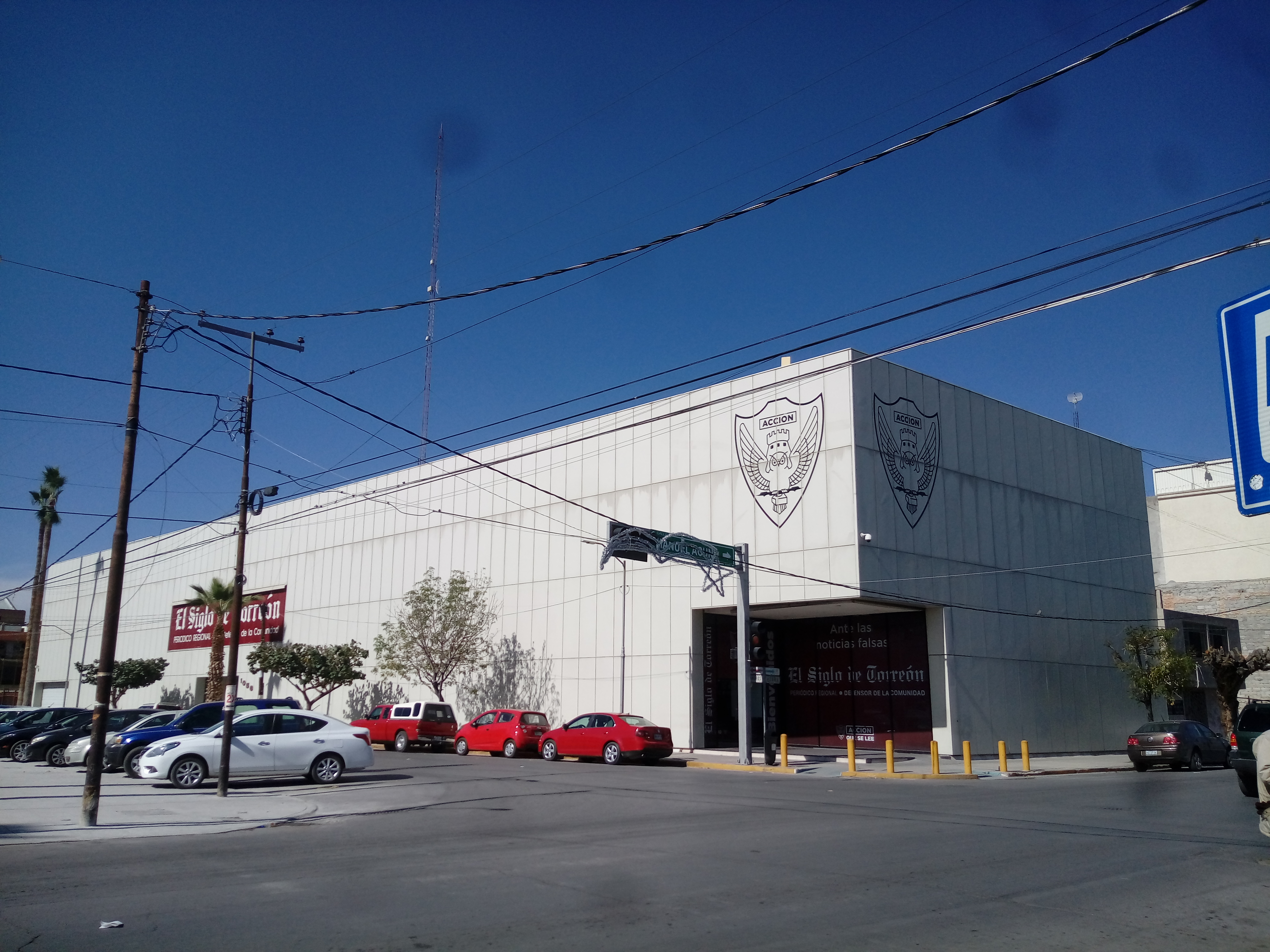
- Type: Daily newspaper
- Format: Broadsheet
- Founder(s): Antonio de Juambelz
- Founded: February 28, 1922; 103 years ago
- Language: Spanish
- Country: Mexico
- Website: elsiglodetorreon.com.mx

El Siglo de Torreón is a Mexican daily newspaper based in Comarca Lagunera, Mexico. It was founded in 1922 in Torreón, Coahuila by Antonio de Juambelz y Bracho under the direction of Joaquin Moreno.

== History ==
In 1921, Antonio de Juambelz y Bracho was dedicated to the edition of a newspaper in the capital of Coahuila that promoted the candidacy for governor of Gral. Arnulfo González, and when he became governor, the newspaper disappeared. Antonio de Juambelz already had extensive experience in the journalistic field, so Joaquín Moreno invited him to the city of Torreón to start with the project of a regional newspaper, calling himself "Defender of the Community."

The first printing machine was obtained from the then governor of the state of Durango, he never refused to donate it because Joaquín Moreno, Antonio de Juambelz was appointed sub-manager while Mr. Moreno himself was the managing director of the nascent company.

With few sources and some people who "knew something", the first issue of the newspaper "El Siglo" began to be published. It was on September 22 when it was ready to be printed, but mechanical failures prevented it from being ready for the next day, and it was until February 28, 1922, when "El Siglo" was heard on the streets for the first time.

In 1925, due to an illness, Joaquín Moreno was forced to leave management and was replaced by José E. Campos, who had already worked for El Excélsior, a newspaper with national circulation. Mr. Campos modified many of the aspects of the edition, giving it a more modern touch, but Campos felt strange in the province and directing a newspaper that was barely growing, so he returned to the capital of the country; It was then that Antonio de Juambelz took the reins of this project.

== Current directors ==
- Founder: Antonio de Juambelz
- Managing Director: Antonio González-Karg de Juambelz
- Deputy General Manager: Alfonso González-Karg de Juambelz
- Director of Operations: Enrique Irazoqui Morales
- President of the Council: Patricia González-Karg de Juambelz
- Council Vice President: Enriqueta Morales de Irazoqui
- Deputy Director of Finance: María del Socorro Soto Navarrete
- Editorial Sub-Director: Yohan Uribe Jiménez

== See also ==
- List of newspapers in Mexico
