= Mujer Latina =

1997 single by Thalia

Single by Thalía

from the album Amor a la Mexicana
- Language: Spanish
- English title: "Latin Woman"
- Released: 10 December 1997
- Recorded: 1997
- Genre: Latin pop, mambo
- Length: 3:38
- Label: EMI Latin
- Songwriter: Kike Santander
- Producers: Emilio Estefan Jr, Kike Santander, Bernando Ossa

Thalía singles chronology
"Por Amor" (1997)	"Mujer Latina" (1997)	"Noches Sin Luna" (1998)

European Cover
- Vengo! Vengo! (Mujer Latina) Cover

Music video
- "Mujer Latina" on YouTube

European Version video
- "Vengo! Vengo!" (Mujer Latina) on YouTube

"Mujer Latina" (Latin Woman) is a song by Thalía, released as the fifth single from her fifth album Amor a la Mexicana. In Europe it was released as Vengo! Vengo! (Mujer Latina).

== In popular culture ==
Former Rugby player Kenny Logan danced samba to Mujer Latina on the popular British TV series Strictly Come Dancing (series 5) in 2007. In 2011, Peruvian actress and dancer Leysi Suárez danced to the song on week six of the first season of the popular Peruvian dancing competition El Gran Show. The South Korean figure skating team performed to a medley of songs, which included "Mujer Latina", at the 2018 Winter Olympics in Pyeongchang, South Korea. In March 2019, Country music singer Cliona Hagan danced salsa to the song on week 9 of Dancing with the Stars (Irish series 3).

== Music video ==
Mujer Latina has two official music videos. The first one is the original version, released worldwide in 1997 and directed by Gustavo Garzon. The second one was only released in Europe and features a totally different footage and was directed by Emmanuel Saada. The European version is considered rare, since it is not available online in good image quality.

== Commercial performance ==
The song had airplay success in Latin American radio stations and reached the top spot in Chile. It reached number two in Guatemala, thirteen in Spain, and also had success in some European countries such as Turkey and Greece. The first music video for "Mujer Latina" was nominated for Video of the Year at the Premio Lo Nuestro 1998

The song was also well received by critics. Joey Guerra from Vibe called the "A fiery hip-swiveling rhythm which effortlessly blended independent-woman themes with Thalía's own sexy persona."

== Single ==
1. Mujer Latina (album version) - 3:53

== Official versions and remixes ==
1. Mujer Latina (Album Version) - 3:36
2. Mujer Latina (Zero Radio Mix) - 3:53
3. Mujer Latina (Euro Mix) - 3:11
4. Mujer Latina (Spirit Mix) - 3:38
5. Mujer Latina (Zero Club Mix) - 6:23

== Charts ==
Chart (1997–1998)	Peak position
Guatemala (Notimex)	2
Spain (AFYVE)	13

== Awards and nominations ==
Premio Lo Nuestro

Year	Nominee / work	Award	Result
1998	Mujer Latina	Video of the Year	Nominated
