= Por amor (Thalía song) =

1997 single by Thalia

"Por Amor"

Single by Thalía

from the album Amor a la Mexicana
- Language: Spanish
- English title: "For Love"
- Released: 3 September 1997
- Genre: Latin pop, merengue
- Length: 3:53
- Label: EMI Latin
- Songwriter: Kike Santander
- Producers: Emilio Estefan Jr.; Kike Santander; Bernando Ossa

Thalía singles chronology
"Amor a la Mexicana" (1997)	"Por Amor" (1997)	"Mujer Latina" (1997)

International Cover
- International Cover

Music video
- "Por Amor" on YouTube

"Por amor" (For love) is a song by Thalía, released as the second single from her fifth album, Amor a la Mexicana (1997). In France this was the titular song of the album. Music videos have been released both for the original and the remix version (Primera Vez remix) which was released after the success of the album in European countries like Turkey and Greece.

The song also received radio airplay in Spain.

== Music video ==
The video for "Por Amor" was released in two versions directed by Gustavo Garzon. The original and international (European) versions were first aired in late 1997. The remix of the song performed well in clubs and was included on the 2003 album Thalía's Hits Remixed.

== Live Performances ==
Thalía performed the song on various notable tv shows all around the world, such as Sábado Gigante and Susana Giménez.

== Releases ==
=== CD promo ===
- "Por Amor" (album version) – 3:56

=== Official versions and remixes ===
- "Por Amor" (album version) – 3:56
- "Por Amor" (Primer Encuentro mix) – 3:54
- "Por Amor" (Primer Abrazo mix) – 3:54
- "Por Amor" (Primer Beso mix) – 3:55
- "Por Amor" (Primera Vez mix) – 4:39
- "Por Amor" (banda version) – 3:58

== Charts ==
=== Year-end charts ===
Chart (1999)	Position
Romania (Romanian Top 100)	55

== Covers ==
- Argentinian actress Florencia Pena recorded a cover of the song for one of her shows.
