= Tú y Yo (Thalía song) =

"Tú Y Yo"

Single by Thalía

from the album Thalía
- Released: March 13, 2002
- Recorded: 2001
- Genre: Latin pop
- Length: 3:45
- Label: EMI
- Songwriters: Estéfano; Julio Reyes
- Producer: Estéfano

Thalía singles chronology
"Rosalinda" (2001)	"Tú Y Yo" (2002)	"No Me Enseñaste" (2002)

"Tú Y Yo" (English: "You and I") is the first single from Thalía's 2002 self-titled album Thalía. The song was written by Estéfano and Julio Reyes, and produced by Estéfano. An English-language version was included on Thalia's 2003 English-language album, also titled Thalia. It topped the charts reaching number one at Billboard's hot Latin tracks, becoming her second number one single on this chart. The song also received airplay in European countries like Greece and Spain.

== Commercial performance ==
The song entered charts in America and Europe reaching the top spot in Mexico and the U.S. Latin charts. The song has sold 200,000 copies in the United States.

== Music video ==
The music video for "Tú Y Yo" was directed by Antti Jokinen and shot in The Bronx, New York. In the video, Thalía sings in the streets, and also visits a music store, plays the guitar and drives a motorbike. In this video, Thalía's appearance is more aggressive. The video used Thalia's first version of the song with added vocals during the guitar drift. This version can still be heard when aired on TV, unlike its online streams. The same year she made a second version of the video with Kumbia Kings, for the cumbia version of the song, this time directed by Leche and Antti Jokinen.

== Track listings ==
CD single

1. "Tú Y Yo" [album version] – 3:43
2. "Tú Y Yo" [ballad version] – 3:33

Maxi single

1. "Tú Y Yo" [album version] – 3:43
2. "Tú Y Yo" [cumbia remix] (feat. A.B. Quintanilla & Kumbia Kings) – 3:52
3. "Tú Y Yo" [cumbia norteña] – 3:44
4. "Tú Y Yo" [ballad version] – 3:33
5. "Tú Y Yo" [master's at bed remix long] – 9:46
6. "Tú Y Yo" [master's at bed remix radio edit] – 4:36

== Official Remixes/Versions ==
1. Album Version
2. Ballad Version
3. Cumbia Remix (feat. A.B. Quintanilla & Kumbia Kings)
4. Cumbia Norteña
5. Latin Version (Unreleased)
6. Master's At Bed Mix
7. Master's At Bed Mix Edit
8. English Version
9. Video Version

== Charts ==
=== Weekly charts ===
Chart (2002)	Peak position
Greece (Greek IFPI Singles Chart)	31
Mexico (Monitor Latino)	1
Spain (PROMUSICAE)	17
Switzerland (Schweizer Hitparade)	63
US Bubbling Under Hot 100 Singles (Billboard)	7
US Hot Latin Songs (Billboard)	1
US Latin Pop Airplay (Billboard)	4
US Regional Mexican Airplay (Billboard)	5

=== Year-end charts ===
Chart (2002)	Peak position
US Hot Latin Tracks (Billboard)	16
US Latin Pop Airplay (Billboard)	29
US Regional Mexican (Billboard)	37

== Sales ==
Region	Certification	Certified units/sales
United States	—	200,000

== Covers ==
- In 2002 the Hong Kong girl group Cookies released a Cantonese version of the song titled " Hong Zu Jia You" (which means "Go Red Team!") as lead single of their album Happy Birthday. This helped the group become one of the best selling new groups of 2002 in Hong Kong.
