= Arrasando (song) =

2000 single by Thalía

"Arrasando / It's My Party"

Single by Thalía

from the album Arrasando
- Released: 18 August 2000
- Recorded: 2000
- Genre: Latin pop; rap; techno
- Length: 3:59
- Label: EMI Latin
- Songwriters: Thalía, Emilio Estefan Jr., Lawrence P. Dermer, Robin Dermer
- Producers: Thalía, Emilio Estefan Jr.

Thalía singles chronology
"Regresa A Mí" (2000)	"Arrasando / It's My Party" (2000)	"Reencarnación" (2001)

"Arrasando" is the third single from Thalía's 2000 Arrasando album, and it was written by herself. A list song, it is recognized as one of her signature songs. Also, it has an English version called "It's My Party". Although both share a general theme of optimism about the human race moving on from mistakes of the past, the English version is an entirely new lyric, rather than a translation. "It's My Party" later appeared on the album Thalía's Hits Remixed.

== Music video ==
The music video was shot in Los Angeles, and it was directed by Simon Brand, who had directed also her two previous videos. Two versions of this video were filmed - Spanish and English.

== Reception ==
The song was also well received by critics. Joey Guerra from Vibe called the "A fiery hip-swiveling rhythm which effortlessly blended independent-woman themes with Thalía's own sexy persona."

The song entered the top ten in Mexico and Greece. The English version, "It's My Party" registered an audience impression of over 3 million between April 9 and 22, 2001, according to Broadcast Data Systems (BDS).

== Challenge ==
In November 2019, Thalía posted a video of her rapping the song a capella. The video went viral and started the #ArrasandoChallenge in which the people record themselves trying to rap to the song.

== Single ==
1. Arrasando (Album Version) - 3:56

== It's My Party / Single & LP ==
1. It's My Party (English Version) - 3:56
2. It's My Party (Instrumental) - 3:56

== Arrasando (Brazilian Edition) ==
1. Arrasando (Album Version)
2. Arrasando (Hitmakers Rio de Janeiro Mix)
3. Arrasando (Hitmakers Rio de Janeiro Radio Edit)

== Official Versions & Remixes ==
1. Arrasando (Album Version)
2. It's My Party (English Version)
3. Arrasando (Banda Version Feat. Banda Pequeños Musical)
4. Arrasando (Con Banda)
5. Arrasando (Hitmakers Rio de Janeiro Mix)
6. Arrasando (Hitmakers Rio de Janeiro Radio Edit)
7. Arrasando (M&M Blown Away Extended Mix)
8. Arrasando (M&M Blown Away Radio Edit)
9. Arrasando (M&M En La Casa Club Mix)
10. Arrasando (M&M En La Casa Radio Mix)
11. Arrasando (M&M En La Casa Dub Mix)

== Chart performance ==
Chart (2000)	Peak position
Greece (IFPI Greece)	7
Mexico (AMPROFON)	3
Panama (Notimex)	4
Paraguay (Notimex)	5
US Latin Pop Airplay (Billboard)	25

=== Year-end charts ===
Chart (2001)	Peak position
Argentina Single Charts (CAPIF)	12
