= Amor a la Mexicana =

Studio album by Thalía
- Released: 24 June 1997
- Recorded: 1996–1997
- Genre: Latin pop; cumbia; salsa; tropical
- Length: 41:17
- Label: EMI Latin
- Producer: Emilio Estefan; Kike Santander; Pablo Flores

Thalía chronology
Nandito Ako (1997)	Amor a la Mexicana (1997)	Arrasando (2000)

Alternative cover
- Por Amor cover

Singles from Amor a la Mexicana
- 1. "Amor a la Mexicana" Released: 3 June 1997; 2. "Por Amor" Released: 23 September 1997; 3. "Mujer Latina" Released: 9 December 1997; 4. "Noches Sin Luna" Released: 20 January 1998; 5. "Ponle Remedio" Released: 10 March 1998; 6. "Es tu amor" Released: 26 May 1998; 7. "De dónde soy" Released: 4 August 1998

Amor a la Mexicana (English: Mexican-style love) is the sixth studio album by Mexican singer Thalía, released on 24 June 1997, by EMI Latin. Recording took place in the Crescent Moon Studios, Miami, with producers Emilio Estefan, Kike Santander, Bernardo Ossa, Pablo Flores, Roberto Blades and Javier Garza. It blends various genres incorporating elements cumbia, salsa, and balladry.

Upon its release, the album received positive reviews and entered the top 10 on both the Top Latin Albums and Latin Pop Albums charts. It was later certified two times platinum by RIAA. The lead single, "Amor a la Mexicana", was particularly praised for showcasing Thalía's artistic evolution. Worldwide it sold two million copies, making it one of Thalía's best-selling releases and one of the best-selling Latin albums of its era.

According to Luca Villa from Billboard, Thalía's album played a key role in popularizing and globalizing Mexican culture.

== Production and promotion ==
Following the success of Thalía's fourth studio album, En éxtasis (1995), EMI Latin began planning the release of a new album. Recording sessions for this project started in 1996, with the label investing approximately 1.5 million dollars in its promotion.

The album was scheduled for a worldwide release in 1997. However, in certain countries, such as Brazil, it was launched in 1998. For the Brazilian edition, three songs were recorded in Portuguese and included as bonus tracks.

In France, the album was titled Por Amor and featured different cover artwork to appeal to the local market.

Thalía visited many countries to promote her album including: Peru, Puerto Rico, Venezuela, Italy, France, Philippines, Germany, Belgium, Ecuador, Argentina, Brazil, Chile, China, the United Kingdom, El Salvador, Bolivia, Spain, Portugal, Indonesia, Lebanon, Finland, Austria and the United States.

== Singles ==
"Amor a la Mexicana" was released as the album's lead single, it became one of Thalia's biggest international hits and is widely recognized as one of her signature songs. A remixed version called "Cuca's Fiesta Mix" was included in some editions of the album and a banda version was included in Thalía's compilation album Thalía con banda: Grandes éxitos (2001), the three versions have their own music video.

"Por Amor" was released as the second single of the album, the music video was released in two different versions, directed by Gustavo Garzon, the original album version and the "Primera Vez Remix" version, both first aired in late 1997. It was the 55th most played song in Romania in 1999. The song also received radio airplay in Spain.

The third single of the album was "Noches Sin Luna" it was released in early 1998 and a Portuguese version of the song was included as a bonus track in the Brazilian edition.

"Ponle Remedio" was Released in 1998 as the fifth single and presented in television programs and radios stations as advertisement.

The fifth single was "Mujer Latina" it was released as "Vengo! Vengo! (Mujer Latina)" in Europe. It has two videos, and it was directed by Gustavo Garzon. The song had airplay success in Latin American radio stations and reached the top spot in Chile. The song reached number two in Guatemala.

"Es Tu Amor" was released as the sixth single, it was also included in the soundtrack of the movie Ever After. Thalia presented the song live during concerts and performed in several events. De Dónde Soy was released as the seventh and final single from the album only in Spain and Latin America. A Portuguese version of the song ("De onde sou") was also released and was included in the Brazilian edition of the album.

Two promotional singles were released: "Dicen Por Ahí" which was released at the same time of "De dónde soy" which received airplay in Spain and later performed on Thalía's soap opera Rosalinda in 1999. The song "Echa Pa'lante" that was included in the Dance with Me movie soundtrack in an English version and the original version was performed in Thalía's soap opera Rosalinda. The version in the movie is completely different from the original song, even changing its message. The original song, in this album, was a political protest song against the ruling PRI in the 1997 Mexican parliamentary elections.

== Critical reception ==
Professional ratings
Review scores
Source	Rating
Allmusic	4/5 stars

The album was praised by music critics. Jason Birchmeier from AllMusic website gave the album four out of five stars and called the album's production "predictably excellent". He also wrote that the album has "songs with compelling, appropriately mexicana lyrics and catchy, singalong hooks" and that it includes "very few, if any, dull moments". He conclude that "Amor a la Mexicana is a sort of timeless album".

== Commercial performance ==
The album achieved commercial success in Latin America, the U.S., Philippines and European countries such as France and Spain. According to Billboard magazine Amor a la Mexicana is a multimillion seller. It sold over 2 million copies worldwide, and is considered "Thalía's best selling album" according to The New York Times in 2003, though they estimated its sales at 1.3 million worldwide.

Across South America, the album sold 93,000 copies in Argentina in early 1998. It ended as one of the most successful releases by EMI during that year in the country, obtaining a certification of Double Platinum, denoting sales of 120,000 units. In Chile, Amor a la Mexicana sold 70,000 copies as of 2000. In Colombia, the album sold over 14,000 units by May 1998, according to El Tiempo. Across Europe, the album increased sales in Spain from 10,000 to 150,000 after her visit in various TV spots. In 2000, during the promotion of her album Arrasando in Greece, she received two Gold records, including one from Amor a la Mexicana. It peaked within the top five in European countries such as Greece and Hungary.

== Track listing ==
No.	Title	Writer(s)	Length
1.	"Por Amor"	Kike Santander	3:55
2.	"Noches sin luna"	Santander, Miguel Jose Velasquez	3:59
3.	"Mujer Latina"	Santander	3:38
4.	"Amor a la Mexicana"	Mario Pupparo	4:25
5.	"Rosas"	Héctor Martínez, Pupparo	4:36
6.	"Echa pa'lante"	Emilio Esfefan Jr., Javier Garza, Pablo Flores, Roberto Blades	3:52
7.	"Ponle remedio"	Blades	4:09
8.	"Es tu amor"	Santander	4:38
9.	"De dónde soy"	Karla Aponte, Cesar Lemos	3:57
10.	"Dicen por ahí"	Aureo Baqueiro	3:57

Brazilian Edition Bonus Tracks
No.	Title	Writer(s)	Length
11.	"Menino lindo" (Menina linda)	Luciano Sotelino	4:11
12.	"De onde sou" (De Donde Soy)	Carla Aponet, Cesar Lemos	3:56
13.	"Noites Sem Lua" (Noches sin luna)	Kike Santander, Migel Jose Velasquez	3:57

European Edition Bonus Tracks
No.	Title	Writer(s)	Length
11.	"Amor a la Mexicana" (Cuca's Fiesta Edit Mix)	Mario Pupparo	3:46
12.	"Por amor" (Primera Vez Remix)	Kike Santander	4:39
13.	"Mujer Latina" (Remix España)	Kike Santander	3:53

USA Re-release edition (2005)
No.	Title	Writer(s)	Length
11.	"Amor a la Mexicana" (Emilio Mix)	Mario Pupparo	3:59
12.	"Por amor" (Primera Vez Remix)	Kike Santander	4:39
13.	"Mujer Latina" (Remix España)	Kike Santander	3:53
14.	"Amor a la Mexicana" (Cuca's Fiesta Mix)	Mario Pupparo	6:44

Por Amor (French Edition of Amor a La Mexicana)
No.	Title	Writer(s)	Length
1.	"Amor a la Mexicana" (Cuca's Fiesta Edit Mix)	Mario Pupparo	3:46
2.	"Por amor"	Kike Santander	3:56
3.	"Piel Morena" (Hitmakers Radio Edit)	Kike Santander	3:54
4.	"Noches sin luna"	Kike Santander, Migel Jose Velasquez	4:00
5.	"Mujer Latina"	Kike Santander	3:38
6.	"Rosas"	Héctor Martínez, Mario Pupparo	4:39
7.	"Echa pa'lante"	Emilio Esfefan Jr., Javier Garza, Pablo Flores, Roberto Blades	3:54
8.	"Ponle remedio"	Roberto Blades	4:09
9.	"Es tu amor"	Kike Santander	4:37
10.	"De dónde soy"	Karla Aponte, Cesar Lemos	3:58
11.	"Dicen por ahí"	Aureo Baqueiro	4:00
12.	"Amor a la Mexicana"	Mario Pupparo	4:26

== Charts ==
=== Weekly charts ===
Chart (1997)	Peak position
Argentine Albums (CAPIF)	3
Greek International Albums (IFPI Greece)	2
Hungarian Albums (MAHASZ)	4
Spain Albums Chart (Promusicae)	22
US Top Latin Albums (Billboard)	6
US Latin Pop Albums (Billboard)	2

=== Year-end charts ===
Chart (1997)	Peak position
US Top Latin Albums (Billboard)	39

Chart (1998)	Peak position
Spain (AFYVE)	47

== Certifications and sales ==
Region	Certification	Certified units/sales
Argentina (CAPIF)	2× Platinum	120,000^{^}
Brazil	—	50,000
Chile	Platinum	70,000
Colombia	—	14,638
Greece (IFPI Greece)	Gold	
Mexico (AMPROFON)	Gold	140,000
Philippines (PARI)	Platinum	40,000
Spain (Promusicae)	2× Platinum	300,000
United States (RIAA)	2× Platinum (Latin)	200,000^{^}
Summaries
Latin America	—	500,000
Worldwide	—	2,000,000
^{^} Shipments figures based on certification alone.

== See also ==
- List of best-selling Latin albums
