= Rosalinda (song) =

1998 single by Thalia

Single by Thalía

from the album Arrasando
- Released: May 14, 2001
- Recorded: 2000
- Genre: Latin pop
- Length: 3:52
- Label: EMI Latin
- Songwriter: Kike Santander
- Producers: Thalía, Emilio Estefan Jr., Lawrence P. Dermer, Robin Dermer

Thalía singles chronology
"Reencarnación" (2001)	"Rosalinda" (2001)	"Tú y Yo" (2002)

"Rosalinda" is a song by Thalía, released as the fifth single from her album Arrasando.

It is the theme song of Thalía's hit telenovela of the same name.

== Background and impact ==
The song is considered to be a catchy up-tempo mix of pop and cumbia. Thalía usually performs the songs as part of a medley with the theme songs for her other telenovelas such as María la del Barrio and Marimar, all which made her be considered a pop princess and household name.

== Single ==
1. Rosalinda (Album Version) - 3:52

== Official versions and remixes ==
1. Rosalinda (Album Version) - 3:52
2. Rosalinda (Banda Version) - 3:54
3. Rosalinda (Tele-Novela Version) - 1:30

== Credits ==
- Words and music: Kike Santander
- Production and arrangement: Kike Santander, Para Crescent Moon Inc.
- Programming and sequencing: Kike Santander, Daniel Betancount
- Guitars: Rene Toledo
- Bass guitar: Kike Santander
- Percussion: Edwin Bonilla
- Trombone: Heman "Teddy" Mule
- Choir: Kike Santander, Maria de Pombo, Lena Perez
- Recording engineers: J.C. Ultoa, Marcelo Añes
- Mixing engineer: Sebastian Krys
- Assistanr engineers: Gustavo Bonnet, Chris Wiggins
- Publisher: F.I.P.P International (BMI)

== Charts ==
Chart (2001)	Peak position
US Hot Latin Songs (Billboard)	46
US Latin Pop Airplay (Billboard)	23
US Tropical Airplay (Billboard)	37

== Covers ==
- Slovak gypsy artists Tomáš Botló and Vanesa Horáková composition "Phenav".
