= Amor a la Mexicana (song) =

1997 single by Thalía

Single by Thalía

from the album Amor a la Mexicana
- Released: 29 June 1997
- Recorded: 1996
- Genre: Latin pop; ranchera; cumbia
- Label: EMI Latin
- Songwriter: Mario Puparro
- Producer: Emilio Estefan Jr.

Thalía singles chronology
"Nandito Ako" (1997)	"Amor a la Mexicana" (1997)	"Por Amor" (1997)

"Amor a la Mexicana" (Love, Mexican-Style) is a song by Mexican artist Thalía written by Mario Puparro and produced by Emilio Estefan Jr. It was the first single from her fifth studio album of the same title. It is recognized as one of Thalía's signature songs and it's one of the biggest classics of Mexican pop music. Cuca's Fiesta Mix was released in Europe as a single. The single was certified Gold in France for more 250,000 Copies.

== Music video ==
There are three different music videos for the song.

The first one, for the original version, was released in July, 1997. It was directed by Benny Corral and mostly shot in a Mexican casa where Thalia walks around, sleeps in various places (a hammock, a large bed and a chair) and interacts with various typically Mexican props (such as a sombrero and several cacti).

The second version was released for the European remix version of the song in 1998. It features Thalia as the sales clerk at a truck stop in the desert and a lot of dance.

In 2001 Thalia re-released the song (with a new mix) as a single for the album “Con Banda”. A third music video was made and features several traditional and iconic elements from the mexican culture.

== Track listings ==
CD Promo

1. Amor A La Mexicana (Album Version) – 4:23

Official Versions and Remixes

1. Amor a La Mexicana (Album Version) – 4:23
2. Amor a La Mexicana (Banda Version) – 3:55
3. Amor a La Mexicana (Emilio Mix) – 4:00
4. Amor a La Mexicana (Tequila radio edit) – 4:42
5. Amor a La Mexicana (Cuca's fiesta edit) – 3:50
6. Amor a La Mexicana (Fiesta latina edit) – 4:02
7. Amor a La Mexicana (Tequila club mix) – 5:18
8. Amor a La Mexicana (Cuca's fiesta mix) – 6:56
9. Amor a La Mexicana (Fiesta latina club) – 7:00

Promo CD + Interview

1. Amor a La Mexicana (Album Version) – 4:23
2. Entrevista
3. Presentando Sus Temas

== Charts ==
=== Weekly charts ===
Chart (1997)	Peak Position
Belgium (Ultratop 50 Wallonia)	9
Europe Hot 100 (Music & Media)	41
France (SNEP)	11
Italy (Musica e dischi)	17
Spain (AFYVE)	2
US Hot Latin Songs (Billboard)	6
US Latin Pop Airplay (Billboard)	2

=== Year-end charts ===
Chart (1998)	Rank
Belgium (Ultratop 50 Wallonia)	71
France (SNEP)	54

== Certifications and sales ==
Region	Certification	Certified units/sales
France (SNEP)	Gold	250,000^{*}
^{*} Sales figures based on certification alone.
