= List of awards and nominations received by Thalía =

Thalía awards and nominations
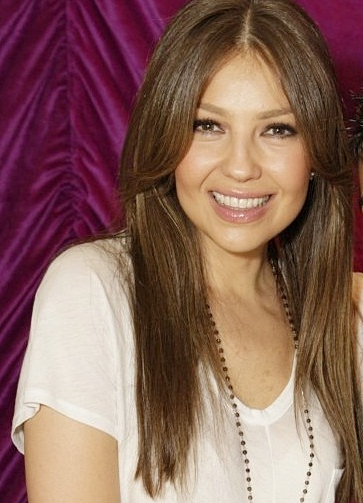
- Thalía in 2010
Awards and nominations
Award	Wins	Nominations
Amigo Awards	0	2
Billboard Latin Music Awards	6	20
International Dance Music Awards	1	2
Juventud Awards	5	59
Latin Grammy Awards	0	6
Lo Nuestro Awards	9	40
TVyNovelas Awards	8	11
World Music Awards	0	1

Totals (Note: Certain award groups do not simply award one winner. They acknowledge several different recipients, have runners-up, and have third place. Since this is a specific recognition and is different from losing an award, runner-up mentions are considered wins in this award tally. For simplification and to avoid errors, each award in this list has been presumed to have had a prior nomination.)
- Wins: 119
- Nominations: 263

Mexican recording artist Thalía began her career as the lead singer of children's group Pac-Man (renamed Din-Din) in mid-1980s. They won second place at the children's festival Juguemos a Cantar by Televisa. She later became a member of the teenage band Timbiriche (1986–1989). Thalía won her first major national awards while still a member of Timbiriche, with her acting in Quinceañera (1987), which made her the winner of the TVyNovelas Awards for Best Female Revelation. Since her solo debut in 1990, she has received nominations and accolades at the international level, including five Billboard Latin Music Awards, eight Lo Nuestro Awards and six Latin Grammy Award nominations. She became the first recipient of Latin Billboard's Star Award (Premio Estrella, 2001) and Global Powerhouse (Poderosa Global, 2023). In 2019, the Latin Recording Academy honored her with the President's Merit Award in recognition of her artistic contributions and influence.

Aside from her works in music, Thalía has been recognized for her charity work by organizations such as Hispanic Organization of Latin Actors (2008), St. Jude Children's Research Hospital (2009), United Nations (2017), and Ballet Hispanico (2022). Her first book, Thalía: Belleza (2007), was selected by the Young Adult Library Services Association for the booklist award of Quick Picks for Reluctant Young Adult Readers. She was included in Radio Ink's annual list of 100 Most Influential Women in Radio in 2011 and 2015.

Thalía has also earned accolades for her image and fashion, including a record-breaking appearance among People en Español's 50 Most Beautiful, making her winner of the "Mas Bellos Hall of Fame Award". Throughout the mid-1990s, Thalía was crowned Queen of multiple festival and carnivals, including Viña del Mar (Chile), Rio Carnival (Brazil) and Feria de la Molina (Peru); the lattermost front a record-breaking attendance (100,000) and graced by then Peru's president Alberto Fujimori, in addition to be received with honors by then Filipino president Fidel V. Ramos. These events and success led Mexican press such as Milenio, to call her as "Queen of the Third World". She has been inducted into the Hollywood Walk of Fame (2013) and Plaza de las Estrellas (1996) in Mexico.

== Awards and nominations ==
Award/organization (Note: Charts are not included, unless they are explicitly described as "awards" or specific trophies are given.)	Year	Nominee/work	Category	Result	Ref.
ACE Award (Argentina)	1997	Thalía	Latin Tropical — Female Artist	Won	
Amigo Awards (Spain)	1998	Thalía	Best Solo Female Latin Artist	Nominated	
Amigo Awards (Spain)	2000	Thalía	Best Solo Female Latin Artist	Nominated	
Ballet Hispanico	2022	Thalía	"Nuestra Inspiración" (Our Inspiration)	Honoree	
Bella Beauty Awards	2019	Adria by Thalía	Best Tressed	Won	
BDSCertified Spin Award	2003	"I Want You" (with Fat Joe)	50,000 Spins	Won	
Billboard Latin Music Awards	2001	Arrasando	Latin Pop Album — Female	Nominated	
Billboard Latin Music Awards	2001	Thalía	Star Award	Honoree	
Billboard Latin Music Awards	2003	Thalía	Latin Pop Album — Female	Won	
Billboard Latin Music Awards	2003	"No Me Enseñaste"	Tropical/Salsa Airplay Track Of The Year — Female	Nominated	
Billboard Latin Music Awards	2003	"No Me Enseñaste"	Latin Pop Airplay Track Of The Year — Female	Nominated	
Billboard Latin Music Awards	2003	Thalía	Viewer's Choice Award	Won	
Billboard Latin Music Awards	2004	"I Want You" (with Fat Joe)	Hot Latin Track Of The Year — Vocal Duet	Nominated	
Billboard Latin Music Awards	2004	"Baby, I'm in Love (Boris & Beck Remix)"	Latin Dance Single Of The Year	Nominated	
Billboard Latin Music Awards	2004	"I Want You (Pablo Flores Remix)"	Latin Dance Single Of The Year	Nominated	
Billboard Latin Music Awards	2004	"¿A quién le importa?"	Latin Pop Airplay Track Of The Year — Female	Nominated	
Billboard Latin Music Awards	2006	El Sexto Sentido	Best Female Pop Vocal Album	Nominated	
Billboard Latin Music Awards	2007	"Un alma sentenciada (Dance Remixes)"	Latin Dance Club Play Track Of The Year	Nominated	
Billboard Latin Music Awards	2014	"Te Perdiste Mi Amor"	Hot Latin Song of the Year — Vocal Event	Nominated	
Billboard Latin Music Awards	2014	Thalía	Hot Latin Songs Artist of the Year — Female	Won	
Billboard Latin Music Awards	2015	Thalía	Top Latin Albums Artist of the Year — Female	Nominated	
Billboard Latin Music Awards	2017	Thalía	Hot Latin Songs Artist of the Year — Female	Nominated	
Billboard Latin Music Awards	2017	Thalía	Top Latin Albums Artist of the Year — Female	Nominated	
Billboard Latin Women in Music	2023	Thalía	Global Powerhouse (Poderosa global)	Honoree	
Billboard Women In Music	2026	Thalía	Icon Award	Won	
Billboard Music Video Awards	2000	"Entre El Mar Y Una Estrella"	Best Clip of the Year — Latin	Nominated	
Billboard Music Video Awards	2001	"Arrasando"	Best Clip of the Year — Latin	Nominated	
BMI Latin Awards	1999	"Amor a la Mexicana"	Most Performed Latin Song	Won	
BMI Latin Awards	2002	"Tú y Yo"	Songs List	Won	
BMI Latin Awards	2002	"Arrasando"	Songs List	Won	
BMI Latin Awards	2003	"No Me Enseñaste"	Most Performed Latin Songs	Won	
BMI Latin Awards	2005	"Cerca de Ti"	Songs List	Won	
BMI Latin Awards	2014	"Te Perdiste Mi Amor"	Winning Songs	Won	
Buhos de Oro (Golden Owls)	1993	Thalía		Honoree	
Bravo Awards (Note: An award given by Asociación Rafael Banquells, A. C. in Mexico)	1993	Thalía in María Mercedes	Best Young Actress	Won	
Calendario Azteca de Oro (Note: transl. Aztec Gold Calendar, an award given by the Asociación Mexicana de Periodistas de Radio y Televisión (AMPRyT))	1988	Thalía in Quinceañera	New Actress	Won	
Casita María Foundation (Note: A Puerto Rican settlement house)	2008	Thalía	Gold Medal	Gold	
Cosmopolitan Fun, Fearless Latina Awards	2014	Thalía	Woman of the Year	Won	
Desi Entertainment Awards	1995	Thalía in Marimar	Best Actress	Won	
Dial Awards (Spain)	2012	Thalía	Dial Award 2012	Won	
Diosas de Plata	1997	Thalía	Special Career Achievement Award	Honoree	
Directors Guild of America Awards	2017	15: A Quinceañera Story: Zoey	Outstanding Directorial Achievement in Children's Programs	Nominated	
E! Awards	1998	Thalía	Celebrity of the Year	Won	
El Heraldo de México Awards	1993	Thalía in María Mercedes	Best New Actress	Won	
El Heraldo de México Awards	1996	Thalía	Best Female Singer of the Year	Won	
El Heraldo de México Awards	1996	"Piel morena"	Best Song of the Year	Won	
El Heraldo de México Awards	1999	Thalía	Special Award	Honoree	
Eres Award (Mexico)	1992	Thalía	Best Album	Nominated	
Eres Award (Mexico)	1993	Thalía in María Mercedes	Best Actress	Won	
Eres Award (Mexico)	1997	Thalía	Special Artist Achievement Award	Honoree	
Eres Award (Mexico)	1997	"Piel Morena"	Best Dance Song	Won	
Eres Award (Mexico)	2001	Thalía	La Mas Sexy (Most Sexy)	Won	
Estrellas Magazine (Mexico)	1989	Thalía	Miss Star	Won	
Estrella de Plata (Note: transl. Silver Star)	1988	Thalía in Quinceañera	Best New Actress	Won	
Fan Choice Awards (Mexico) (Note: A Mexican fan-voted award.)	2019	Thalía	Pop Latino	Nominated	
Fan Choice Awards (Mexico)	2019	Thalía	Urban Artist	Nominated	
Fan Choice Awards (Mexico)	2021	Thalía	Pop Latino	Won	
Fan Choice Awards (Mexico)	2021	Thalía	Best Female Feature Video	Nominated	
Fan Choice Awards (Mexico)	2021	Thalía	Best Urban Female Artist	Nominated	
Fan Choice Awards (Mexico)	2022	Thalía	Lifetime Award	Nominated	
Fan Choice Awards (Mexico)	2023	Thalía	Pop Female Artist	Nominated	
Fan Choice Awards (Mexico)	2023	Thalía	Music Icon	Nominated	
Fan Choice Awards (Mexico)	2026	Thalía	Trayectoria	Pending	
Furia Musical Awards	2001	Thalía	Special Award	Honoree	
Galardón a los Grandes (Mexico) (Note: An award given by Raul Velasco in Siempre en Domingo.)	1992	Thalía	Singer of the Year	Won	
Galardón a los Grandes (Mexico)	1993	Thalía	Singer of the Year	Won	
Galardón a los Grandes (Mexico)	1997	Thalía	Singer of the Year	Won	
Globo Awards (New York) (Note: transl. Globe Awards)	2000	Arrasando	Best Pop Album — Female Artist	Won	
Global Lyme Alliance	2015	Thalía	Gala Honoree	Honoree	
Golden Laurel (Note: transl. Laurel de Oro)	1988	Thalía in Quinceañera	Best New Actress	Won	
Golden Laurel	1992	Thalía	A La Calidad (Quality Award)	Won	
GQ Mexico Awards	2021	Thalía	Career Lifetime Award	Honoree	
Heat Latin Music Awards	2020	"Lindo Pero Bruto"	Best Video	Nominated	
Heat Latin Music Awards	2020	Thalía	Best Female Artist	Nominated	
Heat Latin Music Awards	2026	Thalía	Best Female Artist	Nominated	
Heat Latin Music Awards	2026	"Así Fue" (with Arthur Hanlon)	Best Collaboration	Won	
Hispanic Organization of Latin Actors	2008	Thalía	HOLA Ilka — Humanitarian Award	Honoree	
HTV Awards	2005	Thalía		Nominated	
International Dance Music Awards	2003	"Dance, Dance (The Mexican)"	Best Latin Dance Track	Won	
International Dance Music Awards	2004	"¿A quién le importa?"	Best Latin Dance Track	Nominated	
Juventud Awards	2004	Thalía and Fat Joe	La Pareja Más Pareja (Dynamic Duet)	Nominated	
Juventud Awards	2004	Thalía and Kumbia Kings	La Pareja Más Pareja (Dynamic Duet)	Nominated	
Juventud Awards	2004	Thalía	Que rico se mueve (Best moves)	Nominated	
Juventud Awards	2004	Thalía	Voz del momento (All Over the Dial)	Nominated	
Juventud Awards	2004	"¿A quién le importa?"	La Más Pegajosa (Catchiest Tune)	Nominated	
Juventud Awards	2004	Greatest Hits	Me Muero Sin Ese CD (CD To Die For)	Nominated	
Juventud Awards	2004	"¿A quién le importa?"	Canción Rompehielo (Party Starter)	Won	
Juventud Awards	2004	Thalía	Quiero Vestir Como Ella (She's Totally Red Carpet)	Nominated	
Juventud Awards	2004	Thalía	Chica Que Me Quita el Sueño (Dream Chic)	Won	
Juventud Awards	2004	Thalía	Actriz que se Roba la Pantalla (She Steals the Show)	Nominated	
Juventud Awards	2004	Thalía	My Idol Is	Won	
Juventud Awards	2004	Thalía and Tommy Mottola	Tórridos Romances (Hottest Romance)	Nominated	
Juventud Awards	2004	Thalía	En la Mira de los Paparazzi (Paparazzi's Favorite Target)	Nominated	
Juventud Awards	2005	Thalía	Quiero Vestir Como Ella (She's Totally Red Carpet)	Nominated	
Juventud Awards	2005	Thalía	Chica Que Me Quita el Sueño (Dream Chic)	Nominated	
Juventud Awards	2005	Thalía	En la Mira de los Paparazzi (Paparazzi's Favorite Target)	Nominated	
Juventud Awards	2005	Thalía	Mi ídolo es (My Idol Is)	Nominated	
Juventud Awards	2006	Thalía	All Over the Dial	Nominated	
Juventud Awards	2006	El Sexto Sentido: Re+Loaded	CD To Die For	Nominated	
Juventud Awards	2006	"Un alma sentenciada"	Best Ballad	Nominated	
Juventud Awards	2006	Thalía	Favorite Pop Star	Nominated	
Juventud Awards	2006	Thalía	She's Got Style	Nominated	
Juventud Awards	2006	Thalía	Dream Chic	Nominated	
Juventud Awards	2006	Thalía	My Idol Is	Nominated	
Juventud Awards	2006	Thalía	Paparazzi's Favorite Target	Nominated	
Juventud Awards	2007	Thalía and Romeo Santos	The Perfect Combo	Nominated	
Juventud Awards	2007	"No, no, no"	My Favorite Video	Nominated	
Juventud Awards	2007	"No, no, no"	Best Ballad	Nominated	
Juventud Awards	2007	"No, no, no"	Song of the Year	Won	
Juventud Awards	2007	Thalía	Favorite Pop Star	Nominated	
Juventud Awards	2007	Thalía	She's Got Style	Nominated	
Juventud Awards	2007	Thalía	Dream Chic	Nominated	
Juventud Awards	2007	Thalía	My Idol Is	Nominated	
Juventud Awards	2008	Thalía	Diva Award	Honoree	
Juventud Awards	2009	Thalía	Dream Chic	Nominated	
Juventud Awards	2009	Thalía	Favorite Pop Artist	Nominated	
Juventud Awards	2010	Primera Fila	CD To Die For	Nominated	
Juventud Awards	2010	"Equivocada"	Best Ballad	Nominated	
Juventud Awards	2010	Thalía	Favorite Pop Artist	Nominated	
Juventud Awards	2010	Thalía	Dream Chic	Nominated	
Juventud Awards	2010	Thalía	My Idol Is	Nominated	
Juventud Awards	2010	"Somos El Mundo"	The Perfect Combination	Won	
Juventud Awards	2012	Thalía	Siganme Los Buenos (Follow me The Good)	Nominated	
Juventud Awards	2013	Thalía and Prince Royce	The Perfect Combination	Nominated	
Juventud Awards	2013	Habítame Siempre	Lo Todo Todo	Nominated	
Juventud Awards	2013	Thalía	Favorite Pop Artist	Nominated	
Juventud Awards	2013	Thalía	Follow me The Good	Nominated	
Juventud Awards	2016	Thalía and Maluma	The Perfect Combination	Nominated	
Juventud Awards	2016	"Si Alguna Vez"	Mejor Tema Novelero (Best Theme for a Telenovela)	Nominated	
Juventud Awards	2019	"Lindo Pero Bruto"	This Is a BTS (Best Behind the Scenes)	Nominated	
Juventud Awards	2019	Thalía	Me Llama la Atención (Best Scroll Stopper)	Nominated	
Juventud Awards	2019	Thalía	Hair Obsessed	Nominated	
Juventud Awards	2020	Thalía	High Fashion	Nominated	
Juventud Awards	2020	Thalía	Hair Obsessed	Nominated	
Juventud Awards	2020	"Color Esperanza (2020)"	El Cuarentema (The Quarentune)	Nominated	
Juventud Awards	2021	"Tick Tock"	Girl Power	Nominated	
Juventud Awards	2023	"Para No Verte Más"	Girl Power	Nominated	
Juventud Awards	2025	"Amiga Date Cuenta" (with Ha*Ash)	Girl Power	Nominated	
Juventud Awards	2025	A Mucha Honra	Best Pop Album	Nominated	
Juventud Awards	2026	"Yo Me Lo Busqué" (with Los Ángeles Azules)	Best Cumbia Song	Pending	
Latin Grammy Awards	2001 (Note: At the 2nd Annual Latin Grammy Awards, Arrasando won the award for Best Engineered Album, its recipients were Marcelo Añez, Gustavo Celis, Gordon Chinn, Charles Dye, Javier Garza, Mick Guzauski, Sebastian Krys, Freddy Piñero Jr., Eric Schilling, Joel Someillan, Ron Taylor, J. C. Ulloa and Robb Williams.)	Arrasando	Best Female Pop Vocal Album	Nominated	
Latin Grammy Awards	2002	Con Banda: Grandes Exitos	Best Banda Album	Nominated	
Latin Grammy Awards	2003	Thalía	Best Female Pop Vocal Album	Nominated	
Latin Grammy Awards	2006	El Sexto Sentido: Re+Loaded	Best Female Pop Vocal Album	Nominated	
Latin Grammy Awards	2010	Primera Fila	Best Long Form Music Video	Nominated	
Latin Grammy Awards	2014	Viva Kids Vol. 1	Best Latin Children's Album	Nominated	
Latin Music Italian Awards	2020	"Timida"	Best Latin Video Choreography	Won	
Latin Recording Academy	2019	President's Merit Award	Thalía	Honoree	
Latino Music Awards (Colombia)	2021	Thalía	Best Female Pop Artist	Won	
Lo Nuestro Awards	1996	Thalía	Pop New Artist of the Year	Nominated	
Lo Nuestro Awards	1996	Thalía	Pop Female Artist of the Year	Nominated	
Lo Nuestro Awards	1996	En éxtasis	Pop Album of the Year	Nominated	
Lo Nuestro Awards	1996	"Piel Morena"	Pop Song of the Year	Nominated	
Lo Nuestro Awards	1997	Thalía	Female Artist of the Year	Nominated	
Lo Nuestro Awards	1998	Thalía	Pop Female Artist	Won	
Lo Nuestro Awards	1998	"Piel Morena"	Video of the Year	Nominated	
Lo Nuestro Awards	2001	Thalía	People Choice: Pop Artist of the Year	Won	
Lo Nuestro Awards	2001	Arrasando	Pop Album of the Year	Nominated	
Lo Nuestro Awards	2002	"Amor a la Mexicana" (Banda version)	Video of the Year	Nominated	
Lo Nuestro Awards	2002	"Reencarnación"	Video of the Year	Nominated	
Lo Nuestro Awards	2002	Thalía	Regional Mexican Female Artist of the Year	Won	
Lo Nuestro Awards	2002	Thalía	People Choice: Regional Mexican Artist of the Year	Won	
Lo Nuestro Awards	2003	Thalía	Pop Female Artist	Nominated	
Lo Nuestro Awards	2003	Thalía	Pop Album of the Year	Nominated	
Lo Nuestro Awards	2003	Thalía	People Choice: Pop Artist of the Year	Won	
Lo Nuestro Awards	2004	Thalía	Best Female Artist	Nominated	
Lo Nuestro Awards	2004	Thalía / "No Me Enseñaste"	Song of the Year and Performer	Nominated	
Lo Nuestro Awards	2005	Thalía	Female Artist of the Year	Nominated	
Lo Nuestro Awards	2007	El Sexto Sentido: Re+Load	Pop Album of the Year	Nominated	
Lo Nuestro Awards	2007	"No, no, no"	Pop Song of the Year	Won	
Lo Nuestro Awards	2010	Thalía	Young Artist Legacy Award	Honoree	
Lo Nuestro Awards	2011	Thalía	Pop Album of the Year	Nominated	
Lo Nuestro Awards	2014	Habítame Siempre	Pop Album of the Year	Won	
Lo Nuestro Awards	2014	"Te Perdiste Mi Amor"	Pop Song of the Year	Nominated	
Lo Nuestro Awards	2014	Thalía	Pop Female Artist	Nominated	
Lo Nuestro Awards	2016	Amore Mio	Pop Album of the Year	Nominated	
Lo Nuestro Awards	2016	Thalía	Pop/Rock Female Artist	Nominated	
Lo Nuestro Awards	2017	Latina	Pop Album of the Year	Nominated	
Lo Nuestro Awards	2017	Thalía	Pop Female Artist	Won	
Lo Nuestro Awards	2019	"No Me Acuerdo"	Pop/Rock Collaboration of the Year	Nominated	
Lo Nuestro Awards	2019	Thalía	Pop/Rock Artist of the Year	Nominated	
Lo Nuestro Awards	2020	Thalía	Social Artist of the Year	Nominated	
Lo Nuestro Awards	2022	Desamorfosis	Pop Album of the Year	Nominated	
Lo Nuestro Awards	2023	"Baila Así"	Urban Dance/Pop Song of the Year	Nominated	
Lo Nuestro Awards	2024	Thalía's Mixtape	Urban/Pop Album of the Year	Nominated	
Lo Nuestro Awards	2024	Thalía	Female Pop Artist of the Year	Nominated	
Lo Nuestro Awards	2025	Thalía	Pop Female Artist of the Year	Nominated	
Lo Nuestro Awards	2025	"Troca" (with Angela Aguilar)	Best Female Combination	Nominated	
Lo Nuestro Awards	2025	"Te va a Doler" (with Deorro)	Pop-Urban/Dance Song of the Year	Nominated	
Lo Nuestro Awards	2026	"Amiga Date Cuenta" (with Ha-Ash)	Best Female Combination	Nominated	
Lo Nuestro Awards	2026	"Yo Me Lo Busqué" (with Los Ángeles Azules)	Collaboration of the Year - Mexican Music	Nominated	
Lyme Disease Research Alliance	2013	Thalía	Your Voice Inspires Many	Honoree	
Luces Award (Peru)	2020	"Estoy Soltera"	Hit of the Year	Won	
Mara de Oro Awards (Venezuela)	1994	Thalía	International Actress	Won	
Monitor Latino Awards	2010	Thalía	Best Pop Artist	Nominated	
Monitor Latino Awards	2010	Thalía	Best Pop Female Artist	Nominated	
Monitor Latino Awards	2010	"Equivocada"	Pop Song of the Year	Nominated	
Monitor Latino Awards	2010	"Equivocada"	Pop Song of the Year, Female	Nominated	
Monitor Latino Awards	2010	Primera Fila	Pop Album of the Year, Female	Nominated	
MTV Europe Music Awards	2004	"I Want You" (with Fat Joe)	Video of the Year	Longlisted	
MTV MIAW Awards	2019	Thalía	Viral Artist of the Year	Nominated	
MTV MIAW Awards	2023	"Para No Verte Más"	Music Ship of the Year	Nominated	
MTV Video Music Awards Latin America	2002	Thalía	Best Female Artist	Nominated	
MTV Video Music Awards Latin America	2003	Thalía	Best Pop Artist	Nominated	
National Radio and Television Week	1997	Thalía	Artistic Trajectory	Won	
New York Latin ACE Awards	1992	Thalía in María Mercedes	Best Latin Actress	Nominated	
New York Latin ACE Awards	1995	Thalía in Marimar	Best Latin Actress	Won	
New York Latin ACE Awards	1996	Thalía	Female Latin Act	Nominated	
New York Latin ACE Awards	1997	Thalía	Female Latin Act	Won	
New York Latin ACE Awards	1997	En éxtasis	Female Latin Album	Nominated	
New York Latin ACE Awards	1998	Thalía	Female Latin Act	Won	
New York Latin ACE Awards	2001	Thalía	Female Latin Act	Won	
Orgullosamente Latino Award	2004	"Me Pones Sexy"	Latin Video of the Year	Won	
Orgullosamente Latino Award	2004	Thalía	Latin Female Singer of the Year	Won	
Orgullosamente Latino Award	2006	"Amar sin ser amada"	Latin Song of the Year	Won	
Orgullosamente Latino Award	2006	"Un alma sentenciada"	Latin Song of the Year	2nd place	
Orgullosamente Latino Award	2006	"Un alma sentenciada"	Latin Video of the Year	Nominated	
Orgullosamente Latino Award	2006	"Amar sin ser amada"	Latin Video of the Year	Nominated	
Orgullosamente Latino Award	2006	El Sexto Sentido	Latin Album of the Year	Nominated	
Orgullosamente Latino Award	2006	Thalía	Latin Female Singer of the Year	Nominated	
Orgullosamente Latino Award	2008	Thalía	Latin Trajectory of the Year	Won	
Orgullosamente Latino Award	2010	Primera Fila	Latin Album of the Year	Nominated	
Orgullosamente Latino Award	2010	Thalía	Latin Female Singer of the Year	Nominated	
Outstanding American by Choice	2015	Thalía	The Outstanding American by Choice	Won	
Palmas de Oro (Mexico) (Note: transl. Golden Palm, an award given by the Círculo Nacional de Periodistas de México (CINPE).)	1988	Thalía in Quinceañera	Best New Actress	Won	
Paoli Awards (Puerto Rico) (Note: An award established in Puerto Rico in 1983.)	2004	Thalía	Ballad/Pop Best Female Singer	Nominated	
People en Español Awards	2010	Primera Fila	Album of the Year	Nominated	
People en Español Awards	2010	"Equivocada"	Song of the Year	Nominated	
People en Español Awards	2010	Thalía	Best Pop Singer or Group	Nominated	
People en Español Awards	2010	Thalía	Best Dressed	Nominated	
People en Español Awards	2010	"Estoy Enamorado"	Best Cover	Won	
People en Español Awards	2012	Thalía	Photo of the Year	Won	
People en Español Awards	2012	Thalía	Queen of Twitter	Nominated	
People en Español Awards	2012	Thalía	Queen of Facebook	Nominated	
People en Español Awards	2013	Habítame Siempre	Album of the Year	Nominated	
People en Español Awards	2013	Thalía	Female Singer of the Year	Nominated	
People en Español Awards	2014	Thalía	Selfie of the Year	Nominated	
People en Español Awards	2017	Thalía	Más Bellos Hall of Fame Award	Honoree	
Premios Gardel	1999	Thalía	Best Female Artist	Nominated	
Premios Ídolo (Argentina)	2026	"A QUIÉN LE IMPORTA (VERSIÓN CUARTETO)" (with Luck Ra)	Most Viral Song	Won	
Premios Mixup	2001	Thalía	Spanish-Language Female Artist	Nominated	
Premios Oye!	2010	Primera Fila	Spanish Record of the Year	Nominated	
Premios Oye!	2010	Thalía	Best Female Pop Artist	Won	
Premios Oye!	2012	Thalía	Best Female Pop Artist	Nominated	
Quiero Awards (Argentina)	2013	"Manías"	Best Female Video	Nominated	
Quiero Awards (Argentina)	2015	"Sólo Parecía Amor"	Best Female Video	Nominated	
Quiero Awards (Argentina)	2016	"Desde Esa Noche"	Best Female Video	Nominated	
Quiero Awards (Argentina)	2016	"Desde Esa Noche"	Mejor Encuentro Extraordinario	Nominated	
Quiero Awards (Argentina)	2016	"Desde Esa Noche"	Video of the Year	Nominated	
Quiero Awards (Argentina)	2016	Thalía	Best Singer-Instagramer	Nominated	
Quiero Awards (Argentina)	2021	Thalía	Best Singer-Influencer	Nominated	
Ritmo Latino Awards (Note: Also known as "Premio de la Gente" or Latin Music Fan Awards.)	2000	"Entre el Mar y una Estrella"	Video of the Year	Nominated	
Ritmo Latino Awards	2000	Thalía	Female Pop Artist	Nominated	
Ritmo Latino Awards	2001	"Arrasando"	Video of the Year	Nominated	
Ritmo Latino Awards	2001	Thalía	Female Pop Artist or Group	Nominated	
Ritmo Latino Awards	2001	Thalía	Most Popular Artist in the United States (Male/Female)	Nominated	
Ritmo Latino Awards	2003	Thalía	Female Pop Artist or Group	Won	
Ritmo Latino Awards	2003	"No Me Enseñaste"	Song of the Year	Won	
Spotify Awards	2020	Thalía	Most-Streamed Pop-Urban Artist	Nominated	
St. Jude Children's Research Hospital	2009	Thalía and Tommy Mottola	Rashid Hope — Humanitarian Award	Honoree	
Telehit Awards	2010	Thalía	Pop Artist	Nominated	
Telehit Awards	2010	Thalía	Most Popular Artist	Nominated	
TVyNovelas Awards (Mexico)	1988	Thalía in Quinceañera	Best Female Revelation	Won	
TVyNovelas Awards (Mexico)	1991	Thalía	Musical Debut of the Year	Won	
TVyNovelas Awards (Mexico)	1993	Thalía in María Mercedes	Best Actress	Nominated	
TVyNovelas Awards (Mexico)	1993	Thalía in María Mercedes	Best Young Lead Actress	Won	
TVyNovelas Awards (Mexico)	1993	Thalía	Best Female Singer	Won	
TVyNovelas Awards (Mexico)	1995	Thalía in Marimar	Best Actress	3rd place	
TVyNovelas Awards (Mexico)	1996	María la del Barrio	Highest International Audience (Note: Credited to both Thalía and Angelli Nesma Medina)	Honoree	
TVyNovelas Awards (Mexico)	1998	Thalía	International Impact Award	Honoree	
TVyNovelas Awards (Mexico)	1999	Thalía	Best International Artist	Won	
TVyNovelas Awards (Mexico)	2016	"Si Alguna Vez"	Best Musical Theme	Nominated	
United Nations' Impacto Latino	2017	Thalía	Latino Impact Award — Humanitarian Award	Honoree	
Vanidades	2013	Thalía	Macy's Icon of Style	Won	
Vevo Certified Awards	2015	"Equivocada"	100,000,000 Views	Won	
Vevo Certified Awards	2015	"Te Perdiste Mi Amor"	100,000,000 Views	Won	
Vevo Certified Awards	2016	"Desde Esa Noche" (Premio Lo Nuestro 2016)	100,000,000 Views	Won	
Vevo Certified Awards	2016	"Qué Será de Ti (Como Vai Você)"	100,000,000 Views	Won	
Vevo Certified Awards	2017	"No Me Enseñaste"	100,000,000 Views	Won	
World Music Awards	2014	Thalía	World's Best Female Artist	Longlisted	
Young Adult Library Services Association (YALSA)	2007	Thalía: ¡Belleza! - Lessons in Lipgloss and Happiness	Quick Picks for Reluctant Young Adult Readers	Won	

== Other accolades ==
=== Cultural honors ===
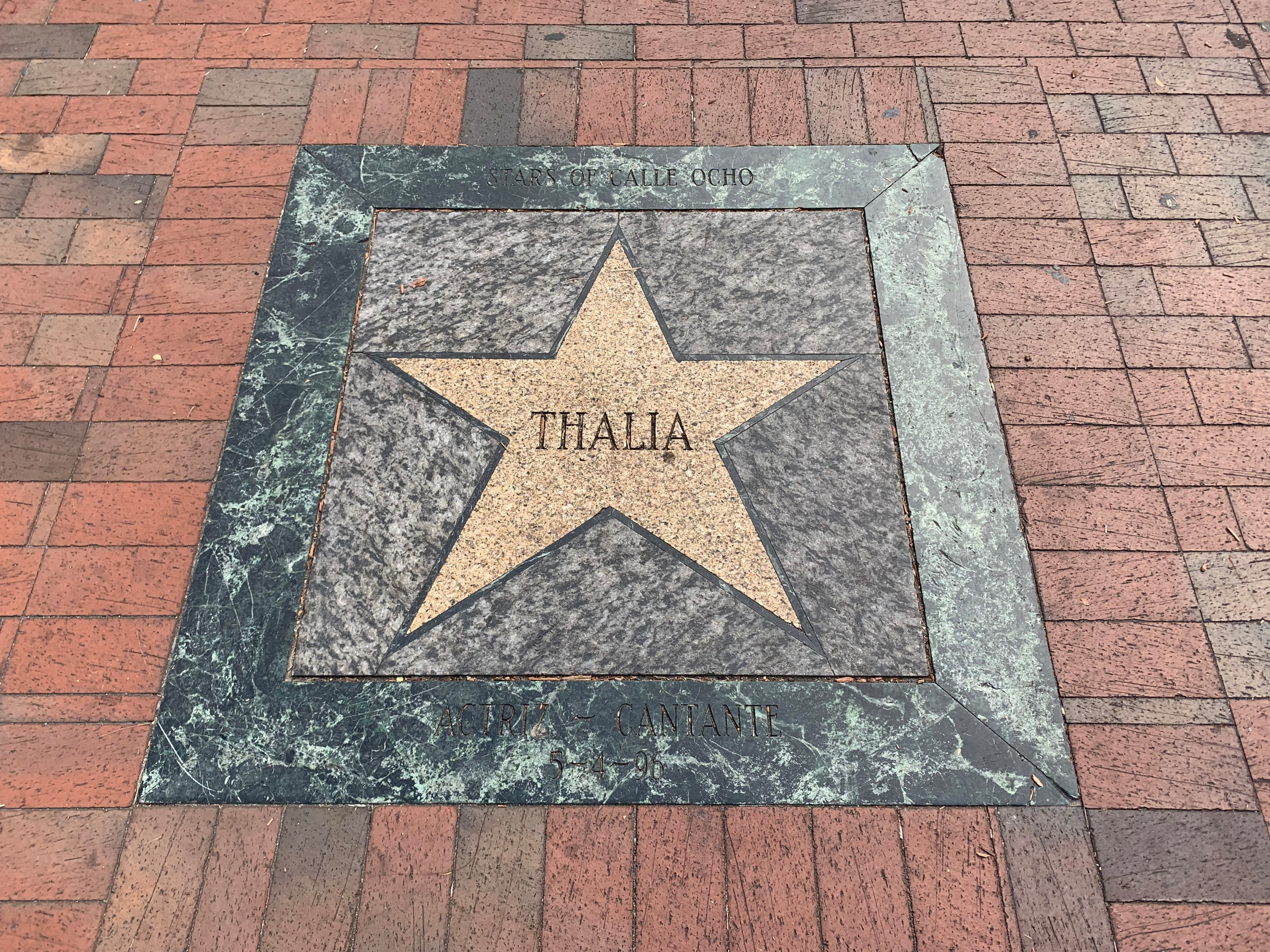
Star for Thalía on the Miami's Little Havana, Calle 8, Hall of Fame

Thalía crowned as Queen of the 1997 Viña del Mar International Song Festival
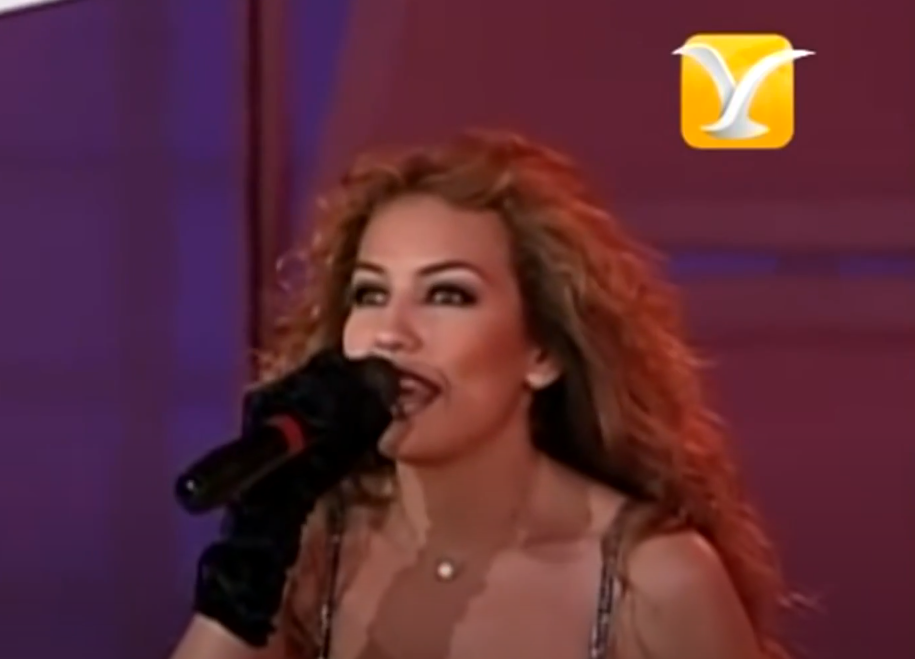
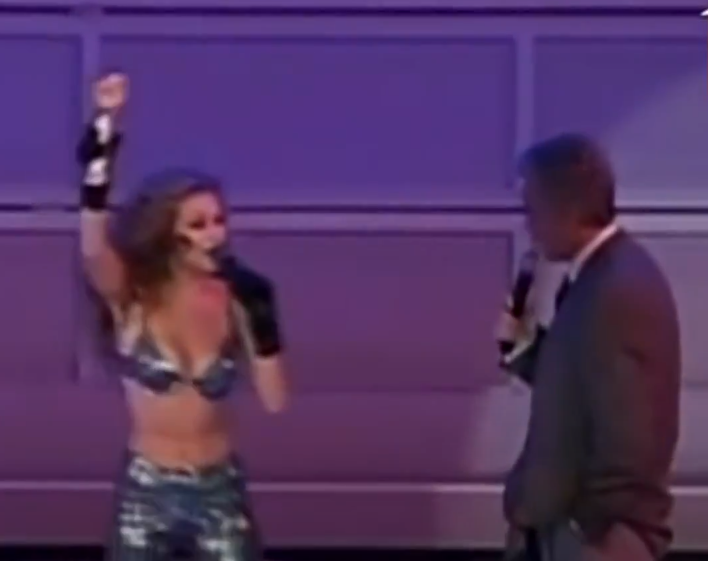

Name of country, year given, and name of honor
Country	Year	Honor	Result	Ref.
Mexico	1996	Plaza de las Estrellas Walk of Fame	Won	
Peru	1996	Festival Queen of Feria de la Molina	Won	
United States	1997	Thalia's Day (25th April) by Los Angeles City Council	Honoree	
United States	1997	Festival Queen of Fiesta Broadway	Won	
United States	1997	Little Havana, Miami: Walkway of the Stars	Won	
United States	1997	Festival Queen of Miami	Won	
Brazil	1997	Festival Queen (Imperatriz Leopoldinense) at Rio Carnival	Won	
Chile	1997	Festival Queen of Viña del Mar	Won	
Philippines	1997	Key to the city of Manila	Honoree	
Philippines	1997	Guest of Honor of Quezon	Honoree	
Mexico	1998	Lottery Ticket Queen of the Mexican National Lottery	Won	
Venezuela	2000	Venezuela Walk of Fame	Won	
United States	c. 2002	Ritmo Latino Handprints: Latin Music Greats	Won	
Argentina	2005	Buenos Aires' Walk of Fame (Note: Walk of Fame established by FM Hit Radio, now Los 40)	Won	
United States	2013	Hollywood Walk of Fame	Won	
United States	2016	Thalia's Day (30th September) by Miami City Council	Honoree	

=== Listicles ===
Year/era	Publication(s)	List or Work	Rank	Ref.
2020	Billboard	Greatest of All Time Latin Artists	n/a	
2025	Billboard	Best 50 Female Latin Pop Artists of All Time	15	
2008	People en Español	100 Most Iconic Hispanic Entertainers of All Time	n/a	
2018	People en Español	The 25 Most Powerful Latinas	23	
2026	People en Español	The 25 Most Powerful Women: The Merit of Never Giving Up	n/a	
2011	Radio Ink	Annual List: 100 Most Influential Women in Radio	n/a	
2015	Radio Ink	Annual List: 100 Most Influential Women in Radio	91	
2011	Univision	25 Most Influential Mexicans Singers	7	
