= High Voltage Tour =

2004 concert tour by Thalía

The High Voltage Tour
- Tour by Thalía
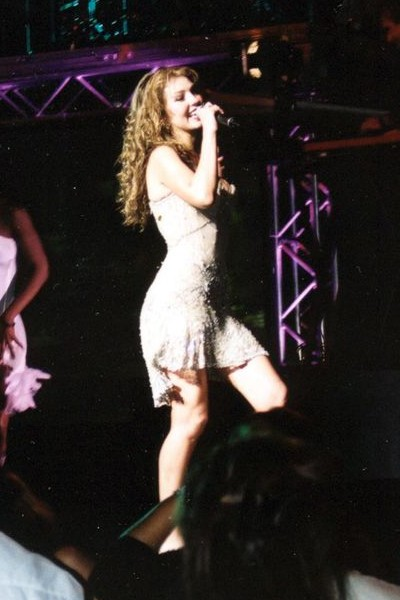
- Thalía performing during Los Angeles concert
- Associated album: Greatest Hits
- Start date: April 27, 2004
- End date: May 16, 2004
- Legs: 1
- No. of shows: 3 in Mexico; 9 in United States

Thalía concert chronology
- Amor a la Mexicana Tour (1998); High Voltage Tour (2004); VIVA! Tour (2013)

The High Voltage Tour was the fourth concert tour of Mexican recording artist Thalía. This tour promoted her 2004 album Greatest Hits. It marks her debut in the United States with a concert series and also passed through three cities of Mexico.

== Background ==
The High Voltage Tour marks the first concert tour of Thalía in the United States, and it was released in promotion of her 2004 album Greatest Hits, which gathers the singer greatest hits, from the beginning of her long labor relationship with the record company EMI Music in 1994.

The Hershey Company, United States' bigger chocolate factory, was the sponsor of High Voltage concerts, and the production was in charge of Clear Channel Entertainment and Televisa Music Promotion.

Thalía had commented in more than an occasion that her concert would be an entire show, with wardrobe, robotic lights, choreographies and other stuffs.

== Concert synopsis ==
During the concerts, queerly Thalía also interpreted songs of her first albums as solo artist, as well as songs of her time with the Mexican Pop teen band Timbiriche, although that songs are not very popular between the general public, inclusive the North American audience and other non Hispanic-speaker audiences.

As for the artistic talent that accompanied Thalía along the tour, the concerts had 2 backing-vocals, 12 dancers, and 5 band members. Thalia had 15 costume changes during the concert.

== Set list ==
1. "Love" (Intro)
2. "Reencarnación"
3. "Regresa a mí"
4. "I Want You"
5. "Un Pacto Entre los Dos"
6. "Amarillo Azul"
7. "En la Intimidad"
8. "Gracias a Dios"
9. "Quinceañera"
10. "Pienso en Ti"
11. "Fuego Cruzado"
12. "Sangre"
13. "Si No Es Ahora"
14. "No Se Si Es Amor"
15. "Don't Look Back"
16. "Entre El Mar Y Una Estrella"
17. "No Me Enseñaste"
18. "Acción Y Reacción"
19. "Tú Y Yo"
20. "Cerca de Ti"
21. "Mujer Latina" (band interlude)
22. "Marimar"
23. "Rosalinda"
24. "María la del Barrio"
25. "Amor a la Mexicana"
26. "Piel Morena"
27. "Arrasando"
28. "¿A Quién Le Importa?"

Notes

- In the Mexico City concert, the singers Diego Shoenning and Mariana Garza, both former members of the teen band Timbiriche, joined Thalía to sing together the song "No Se Si Es Amor".
- In the North American leg of the tour, the rapper Fat Joe joined Thalía to interpret to sing the song "I Want You" together.
- The Guadalajara concert had problems with the lighting. For a moment faded all the lights. The sound system of Thalía didn't arrive on time. A confetti rain fell on the audience but these they lit up fire when they were reached by the pyrotechnic effects.
- In the Mexico City concert, during the song "Arrasando", Thalía broke her pants.
- At the New York City concert, the celebrities that they rumored was present are Francis Lawrence, besides Tommy Mottola.
- During the performance of these concerts, Thalía was accused of not singing totally live, and to use to the playback in several occasions.
- It was also notorious the low sale of tickets for her concerts in certain performances in Mexico and United States, what questioned her convocation power as for audiences' attendance, since none of the tour concerts was sold out, fact that determined the non continuity of the tour toward other regions.
- Another of the critics carried out Thalía with regard to High Voltage, they were linked to the few dates that were part of the tour schedule, what caused the anger and the disillusion of her fans in other parts of the world.

Thalia Notes

- In the rehearsal, I realized that half of my lighting and sound systems had not arrived but rather it had been blocked in customs. So, we made what we could, and with more anger and desires than never, we prepare an incredible concert in the Plaza de Toros. The venue was full of audience, an impressive and full energy people.
- Without a doubt, to sing in the Auditorio Nacional was one of the concerts that more turns in my head during the last years. The night before the concert I could not sleep for all the opposing feelings-love, nerves and happiness. So, the day of the show we commend ourselves to God, so that we presented the best show ever and it was this way. The show in the Auditorio Nacional will never forget it, since the venue was to explode with all my people. For my surprise, they were present Diego Shoening and Mariana Garza, former partners of Timbiriche, and I invited them to the stage to sing with me the song «No se si es amor». Also were present my family and many of my partners of the show business. It was a perfect show that has filled from pride and happiness to the whole High Voltage crew.

== Tour dates ==
North America
Date	City	Country	Venue
April 27, 2004	Guadalajara	Mexico	Plaza De Toros
April 29, 2004	Mexico City	Mexico	Auditorio Nacional
May 1, 2004	Monterrey	Mexico	Arena Monterrey
May 4, 2004	New York City	United States	Beacon Theatre
May 5, 2004	Miami	United States	James L. Knight
May 7, 2004	Chicago	United States	Rosemont Theatre
May 9, 2004	San Antonio	United States	Municipal Auditorium
May 10, 2004	McAllen	United States	Dodge Arena
May 12, 2004	El Paso	United States	El Paso County Coliseum
May 14, 2004	Los Angeles	United States	Universal Amphitheatre
May 15, 2004	San Diego	United States	Sports Arena
May 16, 2004	San Jose	United States	San Jose Center For Performing Arts

- Box office data is not available.
