= 2006 Premios Juventud =

3rd Premios Juventud
- Date: July 16, 2006
- Location: Watsco Center in Miami, Florida
- Hosted by: Alessandra Rosaldo, Cristián de la Fuente, Jan, Ninel Conde
- Website: Official Page

Television/radio coverage
- Network: Univision

The 3rd Annual Premios Juventud (Youth Awards) were broadcast by Univision on July 16, 2006. This was the first edition be held in the month of July.

== Winners and nominees ==
=== Music ===
The Perfect Combo	Best Moves
"Mayor Que Yo" - Baby Ranks ft. Daddy Yankee, Héctor el Father, Tonny Tun-Tun, Wisin & Yandel; "Ella y Yo" - Aventura ft. Don Omar; "Mojado" - Ricardo Arjona ft. Intocable; "Amiga" - Yahir featuring Yuridia	Shakira; Chayanne; Dulce Maria; Ricky Martin
Voice of the Moment	Catchiest Tune
RBD; Daddy Yankee; Thalía; Yuridia	"Aun Hay Algo" - RBD; "Angel" - Yuridia; "Nuestro amor" - RBD; "Rompe" - Daddy Yankee
CD To Die For	My Favorite Concert
Nuestro Amor - RBD; Barrio Fino en Directo - Daddy Yankee; La Voz de un Angel - Yuridia; El Sexto Sentido - Thalía	RBD; Chayanne; Daddy Yankee; Juanes
Best Ballad	Favorite Mexican Artist
"Este Corazón" - RBD; "Un Alma Sentenciada" - Thalía; "Ángel" - Yuridia; "Tu Mirada en Mi" - Ha*Ash	Intocable; Alejandro Fernández; Ana Bárbara; Banda el Recodo; Pepe Aguilar
Favorite Pop Star	Favorite Tropical Artist
RBD; Chayanne; Luis Fonsi; Shakira; Thalía	Aventura; La India; Marc Anthony; Olga Tañón; Víctor Manuelle
Favorite Urban Artist	Favorite Rock Star
Daddy Yankee; Akwid; Don Omar; Ivy Queen; Wisin & Yandel	Shakira; Alejandra Guzmán; Juanes; La Secta AllStar; Maná

=== Films ===
Can He Act or What?	She Steals The Show
Antonio Banderas - The Legend of Zorro; Andy García - The Lost City; Jaime Camil - 7 Días; John Leguizamo - Sueño	Jessica Alba - Fantastic Four; Jennifer Lopez - An Unfinished Life; Kate del Castillo - American Visa; Roselyn Sánchez - Shooting Gallery
Favorite Film
The Legend of Zorro; 7 Días; Four Brothers; Rosario Tijeras; Voces inocentes

=== Sports ===
Most Electrifying Male Player	Most Electrifying Female Player
Alex Rodríguez - New York Yankees; Cuauhtémoc Blanco - Club América; Guillermo Ochoa - Club América; Oswaldo Sánchez - Club Deportivo Guadalajara	Ana Guevara - Track and field; Lorena Ochoa - Mexican golfer; Maribel Domínguez - Soccer player; Milka Duno - Race car driver
I'm a Die Hard Fan of...	Rookie of the Year
New York Yankees; Club América; Club Deportivo Guadalajara; Mexico National Football Team	Omar Bravo Club Deportivo Guadalajara; Carlos Vela - Celta de Vigo; Francisco "Kikin" Fonseca - Cruz Azul; Lionel Messi - FC Barcelona
Most Explosive Rivals
Club América vs. Club Deportivo Guadalajara; FC Barcelona vs. Real Madrid C.F.; Cuba National Baseball Team vs. Puerto Rico National Baseball Team; Mexico National Football Team vs. United States National Soccer Team

== Fashion and Image Category ==
=== She's Got Style ===
1. Anahí
2. Dulce María
3. Jennifer Lopez
4. Thalía

=== He's Got Style ===
1. Alfonso Herrera
2. Chayanne
3. Daddy Yankee
4. Luis Fonsi

=== What a Hottie! ===
1. Alfonso Herrera
2. Chayanne
3. Christopher Uckermann
4. Daddy Yankee

=== Girl of My Dreams ===
1. Anahí
2. Bárbara Mori
3. Dulce Maria
4. Thalía

=== Supermodel ===
1. Adriana Lima
2. Amelia Vega
3. Dayanara Torres
4. Gisele Bündchen
5. Sissi

== Pop Culture category ==
=== My Idol is... ===
1. Daddy Yankee
2. Dulce María
3. RBD
4. Thalía

=== Hottest Romance ===
1. Ana Bárbara & Jose Maria Fernandez
2. Aracely Arámbula & Luis Miguel
3. Dulce María & Guillermo "Memo" Ochoa
4. Luis Fonsi & Adamari López

=== Paparazzi's Favorite Target ===
1. Ana Bárbara & José María Fernández
2. Luis Miguel
3. RBD
4. Thalía

== Special awards ==
=== Most Searched (Internet) ===
- RBD

=== Supernova Award ===
- Maná

=== Diva Award ===
- Ivy Queen

== Performers ==
- Alejandra Guzmán - Volverte Amar
- Alicia Villarreal
- Anaís
- Calle 13 - Atrevete-te
- Chelo - Cha Cha
- Don Omar - Angelito
- Ivy Queen - Te He Querido, Te He Llorado
- Kumbia Kings - Pachuco
- La India featuring Cheka
- Maná - Labios Compartidos
- Ninel Conde - Bombon Asesino
- Rakim & Ken-Y featuring Héctor el Father
- Reik - Noviembre Sin Tí
- Thalía featuring Anthony "Romeo" Santos - No, No, No

== Presenters & arrivals ==
- A.B. Quintanilla
- Adriana Fonseca
- Adrian Alonso
- Alessandra Rosaldo
- Alexis & Fido
- Alfonso Herrera
- Ana Carolina da Fonseca
- Anahí
- Ana Layevska
- Ana María Canseco
- Carmen Dominicci
- Christian Chávez
- Christopher von Uckermann
- Cristián de la Fuente
- Daisy Fuentes
- Dulce Maria
- Eduardo Cruz
- Felipe Viel
- Fernando Arau
- Giselle Blondet
- Jackie Guerrido
- Jan
- Jorge Ramos
- Karla Martínez
- Karyme Lozano
- Kate del Castillo
- La Secta AllStar
- Lidia Avila
- Lili Estefan
- Luny Tunes
- Marisa Del Portillo
- Marlene Favela
- Maite Perroni
- Milka Duno
- Nek
- Rafael Amaya
- Raúl De Molina
- Raúl González
- RBD
- Sherlyn
- Verónica del Castillo
- Wisin & Yandel
