= 24.000 baci =

Single by Adriano Celentano
- B-side: "Aulì-ulè"
- Released: January 1961
- Genre: Pop, rock
- Label: Jolly
- Songwriters: Ezio Leoni, Piero Vivarelli, Lucio Fulci, and Adriano Celentano

Adriano Celentano singles chronology
"Nata per me" (1961)	"24.000 baci" (1961)	"Non esiste l'amor" (1961)

Audio
- "24.000 baci" on YouTube

"24.000 baci" ('24,000 kisses'), also spelled as "24 mila baci", is a 1961 song composed by Ezio Leoni, Piero Vivarelli, Lucio Fulci, and Adriano Celentano. The song premiered at the 11th edition of the Sanremo Music Festival with a double performance of Adriano Celentano and Little Tony, and placed second. It is regarded as the first rock and roll song to enter the competition at the Sanremo Festival. During his performance, Celentano created a large controversy for turning his back to the public during the instrumental intro.

The song has been described as a "portrait of the disenchanted youth of that time, not inclined to romanticism, and on the threshold of sexual liberation".

== Track listing ==
7" single – J 20127

1. "24.000 baci" (Ezio Leoni, Piero Vivarelli, Lucio Fulci, Adriano Celentano)
2. "Aulì-ulè" (Ezio Leoni, Beretta)

== Charts ==
=== Weekly charts ===
Chart performance for "24.000 baci"
Chart (1961)	Peak position
Belgium (Ultratop 50 Wallonia)	4
Italy (Musica e dischi)	1
Spain (AFYVE)	1

=== Year-end charts ===
Chart (1961)	Peak position
Italy (Musica e dischi)	14

== Cover versions ==
The song had a large success in France with the version performed by Johnny Hallyday titled "24.000 baisers". It was covered in English by Claudio Simonetti with the title "Four An'Twenty Thousand Kisses".

In 1999, Greek musician Christos Dantis covered the song, and it was subsequently used as the main soundtrack to the 1999 blockbuster Greek comedy film Safe Sex.

In 2005, Mexican singer Thalía recorded a Spanish version of the song called "24,000 Besos" for her album El Sexto Sentido. The song was planned to be the third single of the album, but was replaced with "Seducción". Even though it was not released as a single, her cover managed to peak at number 83 in Romania.

Other artists who covered the song include Dalida, Connie Francis, Fausto Papetti, Jenny Luna, Carla Boni, and Peter Koelewijn.
