= Vuélveme a Querer =

Vuélveme a Querer may refer:

- "Vuélveme a Querer" (Cristian Castro song), 1995
- Vuélveme a querer (TV series), 2009
- "Vuélveme a Querer" (Thalía song), 2016
