= Greatest Hits (Thalía album) =

Greatest hits album by Thalía
- Released: 10 February 2004 (Mexico, United States)
- Recorded: 1995–2004
- Genre: Latin pop
- Length: 65:52
- Label: EMI Latin
- Producer: Thalía (also executive); Dan Shea, Cory Rooney, Estéfano, Emilio Estefan Jr., Kike Santander, Julio Reyes, José Luis Pagán

Thalía chronology
Thalía (2003)	Greatest Hits (2004)	El Sexto Sentido (2005)

Singles from Greatest Hits
- 1. "Cerca de Ti"; 2. "Acción y Reacción"; 3. "Toda la Felicidad"

Greatest Hits is a compilation album by Mexican pop star Thalía. Released on February 10, 2004, the album features 14 singles from her five previous albums of original material for EMI Latin (it does not include any material from before 1995, nor from her various remake and remix albums), plus two previously unreleased songs "Acción y Reacción" & "Cuando Tu Me Tocas". All of the songs appear in Spanish, including those originally released in English. In April and May 2004, Thalía toured the United States and Mexico on her High Voltage Tour. This marked the first time Thalía toured the US.

== Background and production ==
Greatest Hits is the first compilation of songs from Thalía's EMI catalog. Previously, in 1994, the singer released her first compilation of hits entitled Los Deseos De Thalia (Grandes Exitos) which included tracks from her first three albums: Thalía, Mundo de Cristal and Love, the collection was promoted on TV through commercials and ended Thalía's contract with Fonovisa. Since Los Deseos de Thalía, several other collections with songs from the singer's first three albums were released. The album Greatest Hits includes songs from En éxtasis, Amor a la Mexicana, Arrasando, Thalía (2002) and Thalía (2003). It also includes the theme of Thalía's soap opera María la del Barrio and plus two previously unreleased songs "Acción y Reacción" and "Cuando Tu Me Tocas". All of the songs appear in Spanish, including those originally released in English.

The album was released in three formats: a Walmart's exclusive CD + DVD which includes 10 tracks plus 10 music videos and multimedia gallery, a standard CD with 16 tracks and DVD that features a grand total of sixteen videos, such as "Gracias a Dios", "Amor a la Mexicana", "Entre el Mar y una Estrella", "Tú y Yo", and "¿A Quién le Importa?". The DVD does not contain all of Thalía's videos, leaving out videos such as: "Viaje Tiempo Atrás", "Mujer Latina (European Version)" and all her videos from the first three albums, released by Fonovisa. In the United States the album came with 4 bonus videos.

The singer stressed that delivering a greatest hits album to the public is important: "For me it is very important to give this to the public, because the last ten or fifteen years of my musical history is a story that we have both built, and they have given me the opportunity to have a space and a place in the world of music. entertainment".

== Singles ==
"Acción y reacción": The song was previously unreleased, written by Estéfano and Julio Reyes and produced by Estéfano. This track was recorded during the Thalía sessions, but didn't make it. So the unfinished demo was leaked in May 2002, and received favorable reactions among her fans. Thalia decided this track should be re-recorded and re-arranged. The mastered version became included on the Greatest Hits album. This song talks about Thalía and Tommy Mottola's relationship. The music video contains footage from Thalía's "High Voltage Tour" in the United States and Mexico. It mixes images of her performances and of her fans when they were waiting in the concert's queues. The video was officially released by the TV magazine Primer Impacto.

== Critical reception ==
Professional ratings
Review scores
Source	Rating
Allmusic	4.5/5 stars
Allmusic	(DVD)
DVD Movie Guide	Favorable (DVD)

The album was well received by music critics. Jason Birchmeier from AllMusic website wrote that the album is "a well-balanced sample of the Latin pop star's many hits from the mid-'90s to the early 2000s" and "a great beginning-to-end listen -- again, a nonstop pleasure as the joyful, feel-good parade of hits cascades over the course of the hour-plus CD." He also gave four and a half stars for both album and DVD. About the selection of videos of the DVD he wrote that "Given her big budget, unmatched charisma, acting prowess, and knockdown-gorgeous beauty, these are very appealing videos by any standard" and that the consumer should prefer the DVD version rather than the hybrid CD/DVD. In his review for DVD Movie Guide Colin Jacobson wrote that "despite some misfires, Thalia's Greatest Hits offers a pretty nice collection" and that "the package still tosses in a lot of solid stuff, and the videos mostly work well". He criticized the lack of extras and the absence of "some pre-EMI material" and conclude that "because it doesn’t include material from her entire career, Thalia’s Greatest Hits doesn’t present a completely satisfying package."

== Chart performance ==
In the United States, Greatest Hits reached the number 128 on the Billboard 200. It also debuted at number two on Billboard Top Latin Albums, on the issue 28 February, 2004, while topped the Latin Pop Albums charts. After one month of its release, the compilation sold 50,000 copies in the U.S., according to Nielsen SoundScan.

In Thalía's home country, Mexico, both the album and the DVD release, were certified with Gold by AMPROFON. In Europe, the compilation peaked at number 8 and 37 in Greece and Spain, respectively. The DVD peaked at number 14 in the Spanish charts.

== Track listing ==
No.	Title	Writer(s)	Length
1.	"Piel Morena" (from En Éxtasis)	Kike Santander	4:42
2.	"María la del Barrio" (from En Éxtasis)	Viviana Pímstein, Paco Navarrete	3:53
3.	"Amor a la Mexicana" (from Amor a la Mexicana)	Mario Pupparo	4:26
4.	"Mujer Latina" (from Amor a la Mexicana)	Santander	3:38
5.	"Rosalinda" (from Arrasando)	Santander	3:52
6.	"Arrasando" (from Arrasando)	Thalía Sodi, Emilio Estefan, Lawrence P. Dermer, Robin Dermer	3:59
7.	"Regresa a mí" (from Arrasando)	Sodi, Estefan, L. Dermer, R. Dermer, Angie Chirino	4:28
8.	"Entre el mar y una estrella" (from Arrasando)	Marco Flores	3:44
9.	"Tú y Yo" (from Thalía)	Estefano, Julio C. Reyes	3:43
10.	"No me enseñaste"" (from Thalía)	Estefan, Reyes	4:29
11.	"¿A Quién Le Importa?" (from Thalía)	G. Berlanga, I. Canut	3:45
12.	"Me Pones Sexy" (from Thalía (English))	Sodi, B. Russell, Rooney, Deluge, Bruno, Cartagena	3:46
13.	"Cerca de Ti" (from Thalía (English))	Sodi, Siegel, Di Marco, Gerina, Morales	3:57
14.	"Toda la Felicidad" (from Thalía (English))	Howes, Harrington, Davies	3:17
15.	"Cuando Tu Me Tocas" (previously unreleased)	Ricardo Gaitán, Alberto Gaitán, Maggie Porcell	3:51
16.	"Acción y Reacción" (previously unreleased)	Estefano, Reyes	3:56

CD Greatest Hits (limited edition CD+DVD)
No.	Title	Writer(s)	Length
1.	"Piel Morena"	Kike Santander	4:42
2.	"María la del Barrio"	Viviana Pímstein, Paco Navarrete	3:53
3.	"Amor a la Mexicana"	Mario Pupparo	4:26
4.	"Rosalinda"	Kike Santander	3:52
5.	"Arrasando"	Thalía, Emilio Estefan Jr., Lawrence P. Dermer, Robin Dermer	3:59
6.	"Regresa a mí"	Thalia Sodi, Emilio Estefan Jr., Lawrence P. Dermer, Robin Dermer, Angie Chirino	4:28
7.	"Entre el mar y una estrella"	Marco Flores	3:44
8.	"¿A Quién Le Importa?"	G. Berlanga, I. Canut	3:45
9.	"Cerca de Ti"	Thalia Sodi/D. Siegel/Di Marco/Gerina/S. Morales	3:57
10.	"Acción y Reacción"	Estefano/ Julio Reyes	3:56

DVD Greatest Hits (limited edition CD+DVD)
No.	Title	Length
1.	"Piel Morena" (music video)
2.	"Gracias a Dios" (music video)
3.	"Amor a la Mexicana" (music video)
4.	"Mujer Latina" (music video)
5.	"Arrasando" (music video)
6.	"Entre el mar y una estrella" (music video)
7.	"Tú y Yo" (music video)
8.	"No me enseñaste" (music video)
9.	"¿A quién le importa?" (music video)
10.	"I Want You" (music video)

DVD Greatest Hits
No.	Title	Length
1.	"Piel Morena" (music video)
2.	"Gracias a Dios" (music video)
3.	"Amándote" (music video)
4.	"Por Amor" (music video)
5.	"Amor a la Mexicana" (music video)
6.	"Mujer Latina" (music video)
7.	"Arrasando" (music video)
8.	"Regresa a Mi" (music video)
9.	"Entre el mar y una estrella" (music video)
10.	"Reencarnacion" (music video)
11.	"Amor a la Mexicana (Emilio Banda remix)" (music video)
12.	"Tú y Yo" (music video)
13.	"No me enseñaste" (music video)
14.	"¿A quién le importa?" (music video)
15.	"Me pones sexy" (music video)
16.	"Baby, I'm in Love" (music video)
17.	"Nandito Ako" (music video)
18.	"Amor a la Mexicana (Cuca's Fiesta mix)" (music video)
19.	"It's my party" (music video)
20.	"I Want You (featuring Fat Joe)" (music video)

== Charts ==
=== Weekly charts ===
Chart (2004)	Peak position
Greece International Albums (IFPI Greece)	8
Spanish Albums (Promusicae)	37
Spanish Music DVD (Promusicae)	14
US Billboard 200	128
US Top Latin Albums (Billboard)	2
US Latin Pop Albums (Billboard)	1

=== Year-end charts ===
Chart (2004)	Peak position
US Billboard Latin Albums	21
US Billboard Latin Pop Albums	10

== Certifications and sales ==
Region	Certification	Certified units/sales
Album
Mexico (AMPROFON)	Gold	50,000^{^}
United States as of March 2004	—	50,000
Video
Mexico (AMPROFON)	Gold	10,000^{^}
^{^} Shipments figures based on certification alone.
