= Seducción (song) =

Single by Thalía

from the album El Sexto Sentido
- Released: 10 February 2006
- Recorded: 2005
- Genre: Dance-pop
- Length: 4:02
- Label: EMI Latin
- Songwriters: Estéfano, Julio Reyes
- Producer: Estéfano

Thalía singles chronology
"Un Alma Sentenciada" (2005)	"Seducción" (2006)	"Olvídame" (2006)

"Seducción" (English: "Seduction") is the third single from Thalía's tenth studio album El Sexto Sentido (2005). The song was written by Estéfano and Julio Reyes and produced by Estéfano. This pop/dance track was originally scheduled to be the first single from the album instead of "Amar sin ser amada."

== Music video ==
The music video for "Seducción" was directed by Jeb Brien, who has also directed more videos for Thalía like "¿A quién le importa?" and "Amar sin ser amada", and was shot in the Nikki Beach Club in New York, and featured model Greg Plitt as her love interest.

The video was officially released by the EMI Music official website, and later by Primer Impacto on TV. It aired in January 2006.

== Single ==
1. Seducción" (Album Version)

== Official Versions & Remixes ==
1. "Seducción" (Spanish Version)
2. "Seducción" (Duranguense Version)
3. "Seducción" (Cumbia Norteña Version)
4. "Seduction" ("Seducción" English Version)

== Charts ==
Chart (2006)	Peak position
US Hot Latin Songs (Billboard)	32
US Latin Pop Airplay (Billboard)	14
US Tropical Airplay (Billboard)	23
