= Latina (album) =

Studio album by Thalía
- Released: May 6, 2016
- Recorded: 2015–2016
- Genre: Latin; pop
- Length: 46:19
- Label: Sony Music Latin
- Producer: Sergio George; Armando Avila; Cory Rooney; Mauricio Rengifo; Andres Torres; Khateeb M. Muhammad; Chris Grayson; Isaac Delgado Jr.

Thalía chronology
Amore Mio (2014)	Latina (2016)	Valiente (2018)

Singles from Latina
- 1. "Desde Esa Noche" Released: January 29, 2016; 2. "Vuélveme A Querer" Released: April 29, 2016; 3. "Todavía Te Quiero" Released: December 2, 2016

Latina (Latin) is the fifteenth studio album by Mexican recording artist Thalía, released on May 6, 2016, by Sony Music Latin. The album consists of 13 tracks, including collaborations with Maluma, Silvestre Dangond, De La Ghetto, OMI, Jacob Forever and Chiky Bom Bom "La Pantera". Latina is Thalia's follow-up album to 2014's Amore Mio. The album was praised by music critics' and well received commercially receiving Platinum certifications in both Mexico and United States.

== Background and production ==
Latina represents Thalía's return eighteen months after the release of her previous album, Amore Mio. It is the first time that Thalía has worked with producer Sergio George and the sixth that has worked with Cory Rooney that produced Arrasando (2000), Thalía (2002), Thalía (2003), Thalía's Hits Remixed (2003) and El Sexto Sentido (2005). Pre-production on the album started in August 2015, five months after the launch of her Macy's clothing collection, which would be launched in January 2016. The recording sessions started around November 2015 and post-production in January 2016, ending on February 17, 2016. On February 27, almost a month after the release of the first single "Desde Esa Noche" and ten days after the end of the recordings, Thalía posted the album's cover and its name.

== Singles ==
The lead single “Desde Esa Noche” featuring Maluma was released on January 29, 2016, meeting huge success and landing at the #4 spot on the Latin Pop chart, published by Billboard, while it also became a smash hit all over Latin America and Spain. The music video of "Desde Esa Noche" premiered on Thalia's VEVO account on March 18.

The second single of the album, 'Vuélveme a Querer' was released on April 29, 2016. The song had airplay success throughout Latin America and was certified Gold in Mexico.

On December 2, 2016 "Todavía Te Quiero" was released as the third and final single of the album.

Despite not being released as an official or promotional single, the song "De Ti" featuring Silvestre Dangond peaked at number 17 in the Latin pop charts in Ecuador and was the 70th most played song of 2016 on pop radios in Venezuela.

== Commercial performance ==
The album sold 3,000 in United States in its first week of release, peaking the top-spot and earning Thalía's fourth No. 1 on Top Latin Albums chart. In 2021, the album came in second place as the Best Latin Album by a Female Artist in a fan poll by Billboard.

== Critical response ==
Professional ratings
Review scores
Source	Rating
AllMusic	4/5 stars
Rhapsody	(positive)

Upon its release, Latina has received mostly positive reviews from the majority of music critics, who praised her artistic confidence and vocal performance, as well as the overall production of the album. All music gave the album 4 out 5 stars. Latina was nominated for a Lo Nuestro Award for Pop Album of the Year.

== Track listing ==
No.	Title	Writer(s)	Producer(s)	Length
1.	"Desde Esa Noche" (feat. Maluma)	Pablo Uribe, Sergio George, Maria Adelaida Agudelo, Mauricio Rengifo, Juan Luis Arias	Sergio George	3:47
2.	"La Movidita"	America Jimenez, Antonio Rayo Gibo "Rayito"	Sergio George	3:53
3.	"De Ti" (feat. Silvestre Dangond)	Sergio George, Edgar Barrera, Joey Montana	Sergio George	3:46
4.	"Vuélveme A Querer"	Sergio George, Mauricio Rengifo	Mauricio Rengifo, Armando Avila, Andres Torres	4:05
5.	"Todavía Te Quiero" (feat. De La Ghetto)	Sergio George, Mauricio Rengifo, Sebastian Obando Giraldo	Sergio George	3:21
6.	"Frutas" (feat. Chiky Bom Bom "La Pantera")	Thalia, Cory Rooney, Marcela De La Garza, Sergio George, Tommy Mottola, Lissette Eduardo Cleto a.k.a. Chiky Bom Bom	Sergio George	4:18
7.	"Pena Negra"	Homero Aguilar	Sergio George	2:46
8.	"Tiki Tiki Ta [Uno Momento]"	Filip Miletić, Miloš Roganović, Spanish adaptation by Thalia, Marcela De La Garza	Sergio George	3:30
9.	"Todo [Poso Se Thelo]" (feat. OMI & Jacob Forever)	Hristodoulos Siganos, Konstantinos Pantzis, Valentino, Spanish adaptation by Thalia, Marcela De La Garza	Sergio George	3:37
10.	"Te Encontraré"	Cory Rooney, Mitchell Delgado, Alejandro Fernandez Delgado, Isaac Delgado Jr.	Cory Rooney, Khateeb M. Muhammad, Chris Grayson, Isaac Delgado Jr.	3:46
11.	"Poquita Fe"	Bobby Capo	Sergio George	3:17
12.	"Enemigos"	Homero Aguilar	Sergio George, Cory Rooney	2:46
13.	"Vivir Junto a Ti"	Thalia, Marcela De La Garza, Sergio George	Sergio George	3:28

- Produced by Sergio George
- Co-produced by Armando Avila
- Executive producers: Thalia, Tommy Mottola
- Associate producer to Sergio George: Fernando Rojo

== Personnel ==
Credits in alphabetical order.

Personnel listing
- Maria Adelaida Agudelo - Composer
- Homero Aguilar - Composer
- Jose Aguirre - Arranger, Musical Direction, Trumpet, Trumpet (Bass)
- Jair Alcalá - Accordion, Engineer
- Chris Allgood - Assistant
- Carlos Alvarez - Mixing
- Juan Mario "Mayito" Aracil - Drums, Engineer, Mixing
- Pablo Arraya - Engineer
- Armando Ávila - Arranger, Drums, Engineer, Guitar, Guitar (Electric), Hammond B3, Keyboards, Mixing, Musical Direction, Piano, Producer, Programming, Vocals (Background)
- Emilio Ávila - Production Coordination
- Edgar Barrera - Composer, Engineer, Guitar
- Richard Bravo - Engineer, Percussion
- Alvaro Cabarcas - Piano
- Diego Camacho - Bongos, Percussion, Timbales
- Bobby Capó - Composer
- Eri Carranco - Vocals (Background)
- Lissette Eduardo Cleto - Composer
- Tom Coyne - Mastering
- Lucas Dangond - Accordion
- Silvestre Dangond - Featured Artist
- Juan David - Engineer
- Nicolás Ladrón De Guevara - Engineer
- Marcela de la Garza - Composer
- De la Ghetto - Featured Artist
- Issac Delgado - Composer
- Mitchell Delgado - Composer
- Doug Emery - Engineer, Keyboards
- Eric Erickson - Engineer
- Alejandro Fernández - Composer
- Francesc Freixes - Artwork
- Giuseppe Gallo - Guitar, Requinto
- Carlos Galvez - Piano
- Sergio George - Arranger, Associate Producer, Bass, Composer, Keyboards, Musical Direction, Piano, Producer, String Arrangements
- Antonio Rayo Gibo - Composer
- Gianko Gomez - Vocals (Background)
- Víctor González - Piano
- Chris Grayson - Composer, Producer, Keyboards
- Adelmo Granados - Accordion
- Carlos Guerrero - Percussion
- Manuel Guillermo - Engineer
- Hristodoulos Siganos - Composer
- Jacob Forever - Featured Artist
- Amerika Jimenez - Composer
- Emily Lazar - Mastering
- Lee Levin - Drums, Engineer
- Beatriz Cesar Llanes - Vocals (Background)
- Mills Logan - Engineer
- Juan Luis Londoño - Composer
- Edwin Lozano - Engineer
- Maluma - Featured Artist
- Elkin Medina - Bass
- Juan Daniel Melgarejo - Congas, Percussion
- Filip Miletić - Composer
- Joey Montana - Composer
- Tommy Mottola - Composer, Executive Producer
- Javier Mugno - Engineer
- Khateeb M. Muhammad - Composer, Producer, Drum Programming
- Adriana Munoz - Production Assistant
- Junichi Murakawa - Engineer
- Harlinson Murillo - Clarinet, Saxophone
- Josh Murty - Engineer
- Sebastián Obando - Composer
- Alfredo Oliva - Contractor
- Omi - Featured Artist
- Luis Ortega - Arranger, Engineer, Keyboards, Musical Direction, Programming
- Guacharaca Reynaldo Ortiz - Accordion
- Chiky Bom Bom "La Pantera" - Composer, Featured Artist
- Konstantinos Pantzis - Composer
- William Paredes - Trombone
- Gerardo Pérez - Trumpet
- Marc Quiñones - Congas, Percussion
- Mauricio Rengifo - Arranger, Composer, Engineer, Musical Direction, Producer, Programming
- Abelardo Rivera - Engineer
- Rubén Rodríguez - Bass
- Miloš Roganović - Composer
- Fernando Rojo - Associate Producer, Production Coordination
- Matt Rollings - Hammond B3, Piano
- Cory Rooney - Composer, Drums, Producer
- Jhoanna Rosero - Engineer
- Caliche Sabogal - Percussion
- Juan Salazar - Conductor, String Arrangements, Accordion
- Garcia Salcedo - Engineer
- Luis Sandoval - Bass
- Gustavo Serna - Guitar
- Thalía - Primary artist, Composer, Photography, Executive Producer, Vocals (Background)
- Richard Stella - Trombone
- Michael Thompson - Engineer, Guitar
- Andres Torres - Arranger, Drums, Engineer, Musical Direction, Producer
- Sharo Torres - Arranger, Keyboard Programming, Keyboards, Musical Direction, Rhythm Programming
- Pablo Uribe - Arranger, Composer, Guitar
- Guillermo Vadala - Bass
- Julia Valdés - Bass
- Valentino - Composer
- Dan Warner - Arranger, Engineer, Guitar, Keyboards, Musical Direction

== Charts ==
=== Weekly charts ===
Chart (2016)	Peak position
Argentine Albums (CAPIF)	5
Greek Albums (IFPI Greece)	53
Mexican Albums (AMPROFON)	4
Spanish Albums (PROMUSICAE)	17
US Top Latin Albums (Billboard)	1
US Latin Pop Albums (Billboard)	1
US Billboard Top Album Sales	94

=== Year-end charts ===
Chart (2016)	Position
Mexico (Mexican Albums Chart)	56
US Top Latin Albums	62
US Latin Pop Albums	16

== Certifications and sales ==
Region	Certification	Certified units/sales
Mexico (AMPROFON)	Platinum	60,000^{‡}
United States (RIAA)	Platinum (Latin)	60,000^{‡}
^{‡} Sales+streaming figures based on certification alone.

== Release history ==
Country	Date	Format(s)
Worldwide	May 6, 2016	Digital download
Mexico	May 5, 2016	Compact disc
United States	May 6, 2016	Compact disc
Spain	May 6, 2016	Compact disc
Argentina	May 9, 2016	Compact disc
Turkey	May 12, 2016	Compact disc
Greece	May 16, 2016	Compact disc
Chile	May 18, 2016	Compact disc
Brazil	May 20, 2016	Compact disc
Taiwan	May 21, 2016	Compact disc
