= Desde Esa Noche =

Single by Thalía featuring Maluma

from the album Latina
- Released: January 29, 2016
- Recorded: 2015
- Genre: Latin pop; reggaeton; banda
- Length: 3:48
- Label: Sony Latin
- Songwriters: Pablo Uribe; Sergio George; Maria Adelaida Agudelo; Mauricio Rengifo
- Producers: Sergio George; Armando Ávila

Thalía singles chronology
"Si Alguna Vez" (2015)	"Desde Esa Noche" (2016)	"Vuélveme a Querer" (2016)

Maluma singles chronology
"Borró Cassette" (2015)	"Desde Esa Noche" (2016)	"El Perdedor" (2016)

Music video
- "Desde Esa Noche" on YouTube

"Desde Esa Noche" (English: "Since That Night") is a song recorded by Mexican singer Thalía, featuring Colombian singer Maluma, for her thirteenth studio album, Latina (2016). The song was released as the album's first single on January 29, 2016 through Sony Music Latin. The song was written and produced by Sergio George with María Adelaida Agudelo, Pablo Uribe, Mauricio Rengifo and Maluma. "Desde Esa Noche" is a Latin pop and reggaeton song, with banda and norteño influences, as well as mariachi horns and cumbian accordion. It has received mostly positive reviews and has become a commercial success all over Latin America and the United States, where it peaked at number 16 on the Hot Latin Songs chart and number 4 on the Latin Pop Songs chart, published by Billboard.

== Background and release ==
On December 16, 2015, Thalía posted on her Instagram account a picture with record producer Sergio George, with the caption: "R u ready for the hit of the year?!?!." Later, on January 4, 2016, she posted another picture with him, explaining: "Trying to decide on the percussion rhythm of a song. Those moments in the studio, when one is producing a new song, discussing ideas and mixing musical styles are the ones we singers love!." On January 25, 2016, Thalia started to tease a new single through her social media, claiming that she would release new music "soon". She kept posting the lyrics to the single throughout the week, until it was released on January 29, 2016.

In an interview with Billboard, Thalía commented about the song: "From the first moment I heard the song I said, 'This is a hit.' When Sergio and I worked on the arrangement, I wanted to include Mexican trumpets and he wanted the song to have a reggaeton base. Then I felt I needed an accomplice, someone to sing it to me and of course have me responding to him. Hence the idea to have Maluma came about."

== Composition ==
"Desde Esa Noche" was written by María Adelaida Agudelo, Pablo Uribe, Mauricio Rengifo, Sergio George and Maluma, and was produced by George and co-produced by Armando Ávila. It is a Latin pop and reggaeton song, with "mariachi horns and cumbian accordion," as well as "banda/norteño flourishes." Its instrumentation consists in accordion, horns, trumpets and guitars. Lyrically, the song talks about a sensual encounter between two people that could transform in something else, with the singers trading lines, such as: "Desde esa noche solo pienso en ti" ("From that night I only think about you") and "Me muero por tenerte aquí, pero me da miedo enamorarme de ti" ("I'm dying to have you here, but I'm scared of falling in love with you").

== Reception ==
=== Critical ===
Nichole Fratangelo of Latina praised the track, writing that "the song shows off both of the singers' killer voices and has a beat thats enough to get anyone up and out of their chair." Thom Jurek of AllMusic picked it as one of the album's highlights, and noted that "the skittering beats and pulsing bassline are exhortations to the dancefloor." Cosmopolitan en Español Staff praised the pairing, noting that they enjoyed the collaboration. Billboard Staff analyzed that "[t]hroughout the song, Thalía's flirtatiousness intertwines with Maluma's expressiveness over reggaeton rhythms." The staff from the website FMBox commented that "creative and bold, Thalia surprises us with an unexpected jewel that will serve as an introduction to her upcoming album that is guaranteed to make everyone dance". David Lopez from Miusyk wrote that "Thalía wagers creativity and risk. It's a milestone for an artist who has nothing left to prove to make this option."

=== Commercial ===
"Desde Esa Noche" became one of Thalía's biggest hits in Latin America, where it charted in many countries where she had not charted for many years. In Argentina, the song managed to reach number four on the charts; in Chile, the song managed to peak at number three; while in Ecuador, the song topped the charts. In Mexico, the song managed to reach number three, becoming her highest charting single since "Por Lo Que Reste De Vida" (2014). In Spain, the song peaked at number twenty-two, becoming Thalía's first appearance on the PROMUSICAE charts in over thirteen years; the last song in Spanish was with "Tú y Yo" in (2002) and last overall was Baby, I'm in Love (2003). On the US Hot Latin Tracks, "Desde Esa Noche" peaked at number sixteen, while on the Latin Pop Songs, it reached number four, becoming Thalía's highest charting single since "Te Perdiste Mi Amor" (2013) on both charts. On the Latin Pop Songs chart, the song became her 14th top 10, making her only one of five female acts to place as many top 10s on the chart.

== Music video ==
The music video of the song was directed by Carlos Perez in Chinatown, New York. The shooting of the video took place on February 4 and 5 and it was released on March 18, 2016. In the music video, as noted by E! News' Diana Marti, it "includes a chemistry-filled performance by the [Thalía and Maluma]. The singer rocks several hairstyles, while Maluma gets some new ink." Celia Fernandez of Latina praised the video, writing that "the two are a match made in musical heaven!."

== Live performances ==
Thalia and Maluma performed the song live for the first time in Premios Lo Nuestro Awards, an event that took place on February 18, 2016. It caused a strong reaction in the media for the chemistry between both artists. The video of the performance has surpassed 770 million views on YouTube as of November 2019. Both Thalia and Maluma have performed the song live on their respective tours. On January 31, 2023 the video of the performance broke a record after becoming the first video of a performance to reach one billion views.

== Credits and personnel ==
Credits adapted from Tidal.

Personnel

- Thalía – vocals
- Maluma - vocals, writing
- Sergio George – writing, production, keyboards, drums
- María Adelaida Agudelo – writing
- Mauricio Rengifo - writing, programming, arranger
- Pablo Uribe - writing, guitar, arranger
- Armando Ávila – co-production, mixing engineer
- Juan Mario Aracil "Mayito" – mixing engineer, recording engineer
- Carlos Álvarez – mixing engineer
- Tom Coyne – mastering engineer
- Gerardo Pérez – trumpet
- Jair Alcalá – accordion
- Fernando Rojo – assistant producer, coordinator
- Adriana Muñoz – coordinator
- Emilio Ávila - coordinator
- Edgar Barrera - guitar
- Pablo Arraya - recording engineer

== Awards ==
Year	Ceremony	Award	Result	Ref.
2016	Premios Juventud	The Perfect Combination	Nominated	
2016	Premios Quiero	Best Female Video	Nominated	
2016	Premios Quiero	Mejor Encuentro Extraordinario	Nominated	
2016	Premios Quiero	Video of the Year	Nominated	
2017	ASCAP Award	Winning Song	Won	

== Charts ==
=== Weekly charts ===
Chart (2016–17)	Peak position
Argentina (Monitor Latino)	4
Chile (Monitor Latino)	2
Dominican Republic Pop (Monitor Latino)	3
Ecuador (Monitor Latino)	1
Ecuador (National-Report)	1
Guatemala (Monitor Latino)	1
Mexico (Billboard Espanol Airplay)	3
Mexico Pop (Monitor Latino)	4
Spain (PROMUSICAE)	22
Uruguay (Monitor Latino)	11
US Hot Latin Songs (Billboard)	16
US Latin Airplay (Billboard)	25
US Latin Rhythm Airplay (Billboard)	12
Venezuela (Monitor Latino)	7

=== Monthly charts ===
Chart (2016)	Peak position
Argentina Digital Songs (CAPIF)	1
Uruguay (CUD)	4

=== Year-end charts ===
Chart (2016)	Position
Argentina Digital Songs (CAPIF)	9
Argentina (Monitor Latino)	7
Chile (Monitor Latino)	3
Dominican Republic Pop (Monitor Latino)	10
Ecuador (Monitor Latino)	13
Guatemala (Monitor Latino)	4
México (Monitor Latino)	49
US Hot Latin Songs (Billboard)	55
US Latin Pop Songs (Billboard)	28
Venezuela (Monitor Latino)	25

Chart (2017)	Position
Bolivia (Monitor Latino)	41
Chile (Monitor Latino)	20
Guatemala (Monitor Latino)	69
Uruguay (Monitor Latino)	23

Chart (2018)	Position
Chile (Monitor Latino)	75

Chart (2020)	Position
Chile Pop (Monitor Latino)	91

== Certifications ==
Region	Certification	Certified units/sales
Brazil (Pro-Música Brasil)	Platinum	60,000^{‡}
Mexico (AMPROFON)	Diamond+2× Platinum+Gold	450,000^{‡}
Spain (Promusicae)	Platinum	40,000^{‡}
United States (RIAA)	2× Platinum (Latin)	120,000^{‡}
^{‡} Sales+streaming figures based on certification alone.
