= Thalía (English-language album) =

Studio album by Thalía
- Released: July 8, 2003
- Recorded: 2002
- Genre: Pop; R&B
- Length: 56:59
- Language: English; Spanish
- Label: Virgin
- Producer: Steve Morales; Cory Rooney; Davy Deluge; Martin Harrington; Ric Wake; Estéfano

Thalía chronology
Hits Remixed (2003)	Thalía (2003)	Greatest Hits (2004)

Singles from Thalia (English album)
- 1. "I Want You/Me Pones Sexy" Released: May 5, 2003; 2. "Baby, I'm in Love/Alguien Real" Released: November 2, 2003

Thalía is the ninth studio album and first English-language album by Mexican singer Thalía. Released on July 8, 2003, by Virgin Records, it represents her first full-length project recorded entirely in English and a significant step in her effort to expand into the global pop market. The album’s production marked her first collaboration with Virgin Records, which also reissued her previous EMI catalog worldwide in support of this new international phase of her career.

The record generated notable attention for its lead single "I Want You", featuring rapper Fat Joe, which achieved commercial success in several countries and became her most successful English-language hit. Despite its strong promotional campaign, Thalía received mixed reviews from critics, who praised its polished production and R&B influences but criticized the album’s reliance on bilingual versions and lack of artistic risk. Commercially, it debuted at number 11 on the Billboard 200 and earned Gold certifications in Mexico and Japan.

== Background and production ==
EMI Music planned a major investment in Thalia's career with her follow-up album Arrasando. In 2000, Jose Behar, president of her record label told to Billboard that Thalia was "completely committed reaching the largest possible audience" and that "an English crossover is part of the ultimate plan for Thalia, but we're not rushing anything, our intention is for things to evolve naturally."

In 2003 she signed with Virgin Records and released her first album in English. Months later Virgin re-released all of her previous albums produced by EMI Music globally.

== Singles ==
Three singles were released: "I Want You" was the first one and also the album's most popular song, peaking at number 21 in the U.S. on Billboard's Hot 100 and number 1 at Brazil's Hot 100. In Australia & Greece the song peaked number 25 and number 29 in Canada. The spanish version of the song peaked number 9 at Hot Latin Songs.

"Baby, I'm in Love" was the second single, it performed poorly peaking number 20 in Spain, number 45 in Greece. and number 77 in Romania. The Boris & Beck Remix peaked number 6 at Billboard's Dance Singles Sales. "Alguien Real" the Spanish version of the song, didn't chart in any country.

"Cerca de Ti" was the third and last single of the album only for Latin America, it peaked at number one on Billboard's Hot Latin Songs.

"Don't Look Back" was remixed on an EP on two variants, the "Norty Cotto" Remixes and the "Jason Nevins" Remixes, later they were fused onto one same album and it did well on Billboard's Dance Music/Club Play Singles peaking at number 9.

== Critical reception ==
Professional ratings
Review scores
Source	Rating
Allmusic	2.5/5 stars
Entertainment Weekly	C
Rolling Stone	3/5 stars
Vibe	2/5 stars

Thalía received mixed reviews from music critics. Johnny Loftus from AllMusic website wrote that the album "stylization in both sound and sight -- is more marketable than breaking new ground" and that it "is doubly disappointing, since its second half consists mostly of Spanish-language versions of the singles in its first half." Barry Walters from Rolling Stone magazine gave the album three out of five stars and claimed that "unfortunately, Thalia's efforts to break the language barrier, make her meek and mute her charms". Neil Drumming from Entertainment Weekly website gave the album a C and called it "unoriginal." He also criticized the fact that half of the songs are in Spanish. Joey Guerra from Vibe magazine noted that the singer's English-language debut shifts away from her usual vibrant style, offering R&B-influenced tracks like "I Want You" with Fat Joe. However, according to him the album relies on clichéd songwriting and lacks the confident, fiery energy of her Spanish hits. Guerra affirmed that the only standout moments come from reworked older material, making it feel like something was lost in translation.

== Commercial performance ==
Thalía achieved a moderate commercial performance. The album debuted at the number 11 on the US Billboard 200 chart with 50,000 units sold on its first week, becoming the highest charting album on the chart by any Latin act since Paulina Rubio's Border Girl (2002), which similarly debuted at number 11 with 56,000 copies on July 6, 2002. Initially, 400,000 units of the album were shipped, and sold 196,000 copies in the US until July 2005, according to Nielsen Soundscan. In Mexico, the album was certified Gold on November 17, 2003, by AMPROFON, denoting sales of over 50,000 units. As of August 2003, Thalía sold 70,000 copies there. Elsewhere, the album peaked at number 3 in both Argentina and Greece, and number 27 in Czech Republic.

Across Asia, Thalía debuted and peaked at number 17 on the South Korean international monthly album charts, selling 3,000 units according to the Korea Record Industry Association. The Japanese release, titled I Want You, was certified Gold by the Recording Industry Association of Japan (RIAJ) on September 2003, denoting shipments of 100,000 units. The album spent at least ten weeks on the Japanese Oricon Albums Chart peaking within the top ten, and sold an estimated 200,000 copies by early 2004.

== Track listing ==
Thalía track listing
No.	Title	Writer(s)	Producer(s)	Length
1.	"I Want You" (featuring Fat Joe)	Brenda Russell; Cory Rooney; Fat Joe; Gregory Bruno	Rooney; Davy Deluge	3:46
2.	"Baby, I'm in Love"	Guy Roche; Kara DioGuardi	Ric Wake	3:54
3.	"Misbehavin'"	Cathy Dennis; David Siegel; Steve Morales	Morales	3:38
4.	"Don't Look Back"	Ash Howes; Martin Harrington; Rob Davis	Howes; Harrington	3:15
5.	"Another Girl"	Dennis; Siegel; Morales	Morales	3:46
6.	"What's It Gonna Be Boy?"	Rooney; Morales	Morales	3:40
7.	"Closer to You"	Thalía; Siegel; Di Marco; Morales	Morales	3:56
8.	"Save the Day"	Thalía; Siegel; Kara DioGuardi; Lincoln Browder; Morales	Morales; Dmo^{[a]}	3:45
9.	"Tú y Yo (English Version)"	DioGuardi	Estéfano	3:43
10.	"Dance Dance (The Mexican)" (Hex Hector Club Mix)	Thalía; Rooney; Alan Shacklock; Jean-Claude Olivier; Samuel Barnes	Rooney; Poke & Tone	8:46
11.	"Me Pones Sexy" (featuring Fat Joe)	Thalía; Russell; Rooney; Fat Joe; Bruno	Rooney; Deluge	3:46
12.	"Alguien Real"	Thalía; Roche; DioGuardi	Ric Wake	3:56
13.	"Cerca de Ti"	Thalía; Siegel; Di Marco; Morales	Morales	3:57
14.	"Toda la Felicidad"	Thalía; Howes; Harrington; Davis	Howes; Harrington	3:17
Total length:				56:59

Japanese limited edition
No.	Title	Writer(s)	Producer(s)	Length
15.	"Baby, I'm In Love" (GW-1 Bario Mix)	Roche; DioGuardi	Wake; GW-1^{[b]}	7:39
16.	"Baby, I'm In Love" (Boris & Beck Club Mix)	Guy Roche; Kara DioGuardi	Wake; DJ Boris^{[b]}; Doug Beck^{[b]}	3:39

Japanese limited edition DVD
No.	Title	Length
1.	"I Want You" (Music video)	3:43
2.	"Baby, I'm In Love" (Music video)	3:54
3.	"Exclusive Interview" (English)	10:00

I Want You Japanese edition
No.	Title	Writer(s)	Producer(s)	Length
15.	"I Want You" (Pablo Flores Club Mix)	Thalía; Russell; Rooney; Fat Joe; Bruno	Rooney; Deluge; Pablo Flores^{[b]}	7:39
16.	"I Want You" (Pablo Flores Import House Mix)	Thalía; Russell; Rooney; Fat Joe; Bruno	Rooney; Deluge; Flores^{[b]}	3:39

Notes

- ^{^[a]} denotes co-producer(s)
- ^{^[b]} denotes additional producer(s)

Sample credits

- "I Want You" contains excperts and elements from the composition "A Little Bit of Love" by Brenda Russell.

== Charts ==
Weekly chart performance
Chart (2003)	Peak position
Argentine Albums (CAPIF)	3
Czech Albums (IFPI Czech)	27
Greece International Albums (IFPI Greece)	3
Japan Albums (Oricon)	10
US Billboard 200	11

Monthly chart performance
Chart (2003)	Peak position
South Korea International Albums (MIAK)	17

== Certifications and sales ==
Certifications
Region	Certification	Certified units/sales
Japan (RIAJ)	Gold	200,000
Mexico (AMPROFON)	Gold	70,000
South Korea	—	3,039
United States	—	196,000
Summaries
Worldwide	—	750,000

== Release history ==
Release dates and formats
Region	Date	Edition(s)
United States, Canada, Latin America & Spain	July 8, 2003	Standard
United Kingdom	July 12, 2003	Standard
France	July 22, 2003	Standard
South Korea	August 25, 2003	Standard
Australia	September 1, 2003	Standard
Japan	September 3, 2004	Standard
Japan	January 16, 2004	Special Edition
