= Todavía Te Quiero =

- Promo ad of the single by Sony Music.

Single by Thalía featuring De La Ghetto

from the album Latina
- Released: December 2, 2016
- Recorded: 2015
- Genre: Latin pop; reggaeton; banda
- Length: 3:21
- Label: Sony Latin
- Songwriters: Sergio George; Mauricio Rengifo; Sebastian Obando Giraldo
- Producer: Sergio George

Thalía singles chronology
| "Vuélveme a Querer" (2016) | "Todavía Te Quiero" (2016) | "Junto A Ti" (2017) |

De La Ghetto singles chronology
| "Bailen" (2015) | "Todavía Te Quiero" (2017) | "Pide Lo Que Tú Quieras" (2017) |

Music video
- "Todavía Te Quiero" on YouTube

"Todavía Te Quiero" (transl. "I Still Love You") is a song recorded by Mexican singer Thalía, featuring American singer De La Ghetto, for her thirteenth studio album, Latina (2016). The song was released as the album's third single on December 2, 2016 through Sony Music Latin.

It entered the LatinPop charts in the U.S.and the top 100 in Venezuela, staying on the latter chart for over 20 weeks.

== Live performance ==
Thalía and De La Ghetto performed the song at the Premios Lo Nuestro 2017. The performance was considered one of the best from the night.

== Music video ==
The music video was released the same day as the song. The video is fully animated by Pochoclo Studios in Argentina. It features Thalía working on a time travel gadget that her doggy snatches and travels to an unknown time to. Thalía goes back in time to rescue her dog and eventually he is returned to her by De La Ghetto. When she gets her dog back, she takes him with her back to the present and she is so happy that she doesn't realize that she altered the timeline. The video makes reference to much from Thalía's career, such as the dog being "Pulgoso" from her telenovela Marimar, a robot with a "sink bra" like the one she wore on her video for "Piel Morena", and even references the rumor that she had her ribs removed.

== Charts ==
| Chart (2017) | Peak position |
|---|---|
| US Latin Pop Airplay (Billboard) | 32 |
| Venezuela (Record Report) | 74 |
