= Tick-Borne Disease Alliance =

American charity

The Tick-Borne Disease Alliance (TBDA) was an American national not-for-profit charity that was dedicated to raising awareness, supporting initiatives and promoting advocacy to find a cure for tick-borne diseases, including Lyme.

TBDA was formed in the spring of 2012 by Staci Grodin, the co-founder of the Turn the Corner Foundation, and David Roth, the co-founder of the Tick-Borne Disease Initiative. Roth has stated that he knew very little about Lyme disease or any other tick-borne diseases until he was diagnosed with Lyme himself, motivating him to raise awareness and increase funding for diagnostic testing.

== Bite Back for a Cure ==
In 2013, TBDA launched the Bite Back for a Cure campaign, a national grassroots campaign to build support for the fight against tick-borne diseases through raising awareness and through supporting tick-borne disease research. Candice Accola, star of The Vampire Diaries, is a spokesperson.

== Fundraising ==
TBDA held its first annual gala on May 16, 2012, at Chelsea Piers in New York City. The benefit helped support TBDA's public awareness and advocacy campaign, and helped raise money for research to find an accurate diagnostic tool. On May 2, 2013, TBDA held the Tick-Borne Disease Alliance 2nd Annual Benefit, also at Chelsea Piers. Candice Accola was the host.

== Advocacy ==
On March 11, 2013, TBDA hosted a forum with U.S. Senators Kirsten Gillibrand (D-N.Y.), Richard Blumenthal (D-CT) and Congressman Chris Gibson (R-NY) at Weill Cornell Medical College in New York City to discuss the fight against the silent epidemic of tick-borne diseases, including Lyme disease. Gillibrand, Blumenthal, Weill Cornell Medical College's dean Dr. Laurie H. Glimcher and co-chairman of TBDA David Roth were distinguished speakers at the forum.

== Merger ==
In February 2014, TBDA merged with the Stamford-based Lyme Research Alliance to form a new charity, the Global Lyme Alliance. The GLA has been criticized for promoting the pseudoscientific diagnosis of chronic Lyme disease, with David Gorski of Science-Based Medicine commenting the Alliance "appears very much into chronic Lyme disease woo."
