= Vuélveme a Querer (Thalía song) =

Single by Thalía

from the album Latina
- Released: April 29, 2016
- Recorded: 2015
- Genre: Latin rock
- Length: 4:05
- Label: Sony Music Latin
- Songwriters: Mauricio Rengifo; Sergio George
- Producers: Mauricio Rengifo; Armando Ávila; Andres Torres

Thalía singles chronology
"Desde Esa Noche" (2016)	"Vuélveme a Querer" (2016)	"Todavía Te Quiero" (2016)

"Vuélveme a Querer" (English: "Love Me Again") is a song recorded by Mexican recording artist Thalía from her thirteenth studio album Latina (2016). It was written by Mauricio Rengifo and Sergio George, and produced by Rengifo, Armando Ávila and Andres Torres. The song was released as the album's second single on April 29, 2016. A Bachatón version of the song featuring Tito El Bambino was released on June 24, 2016. "Vuélveme a Querer" is a Latin rock ballad about trying to rekindle the passion with a lover.

== Composition and lyrics ==
"Vuélveme a Querer" was written by Mauricio Rengifo and Sergio George, and produced by Rengifo, Armando Ávila and Andres Torres. Ávila was also responsible for arrangements, musical direction, drums, piano, B3, electric and acoustic guitars, keyboards and programming; Rengifo and Torres also provided arrangements and musical direction, with Torres also providing drums. Its instrumentation consists in acoustic guitar, electric guitar, organ, piano, drums and keyboards.

The song is a Latin rock ballad about trying to rekindle the passion with a lover, with the singer talking about the different stages of love. Thalía talked about the song in an interview for Semana, stating: "In my career, there's always been this duality between the fun and the romantic persona, and this song is the "tearjerker" kind of ballad that gives stitches to the heart. It's a power ballad like I've never done it before. I believe it's one of my best ballads."

== Release and reception ==
"Vuélveme a Querer" was released as the album's second single on April 29, 2016 as a digital download. A Bachatón version of the song featuring Puerto Rican singer Tito El Bambino was released on June 24, 2016. Thom Jurek of AllMusic called it a powerful song that "begins as a tender pop ballad and transforms itself into a Latin rock anthem in waltz time." Alejandro Mendoza of Farandula was impressed with its lyrics, noting that they "ring close directly to the heart."

== Music video ==
The music video was released on May 10, 2016. As explained by Griselda Flores of Billboard, the video is set "in a beautiful theater, [where] the Mexican pop star appears running through its empty halls in a glamorous nude-colored ball gown while also sporting a second casual look, jeans and a white t-shirt, when singing the romantic song onstage."

== Track listings ==
- Digital download
1. "Vuélveme a Querer" – 4:05
- Bachata version digital download
1. "Vuélveme a Querer [feat. Tito El Bambino]" – 4:08

== Charts ==
=== Weekly charts ===
Chart (2016)	Peak position
Colombia Pop (Monitor Latino)	11
Ecuador Pop (Monitor Latino)	15
Mexico (Billboard Mexican Airplay)	40
Mexico (Billboard Espanol Airplay)	6
US Latin Pop Airplay (Billboard)	20
Venezuela Pop (Monitor Latino)	15
Venezuela (Record Report)	99

=== Year-end charts ===
Chart (2016)	Position
Ecuador Pop (Monitor Latino)	51
México Pop (Monitor Latino)	71
Venezuela Pop (Monitor Latino)	44

Chart (2017)	Position
Colombia Pop (Monitor Latino)	71

== Certifications ==
Region	Certification	Certified units/sales
Mexico (AMPROFON)	Gold	30,000^{*}
^{*} Sales figures based on certification alone.
