= Piero Vivarelli =

Italian film director, screenwriter and lyricist

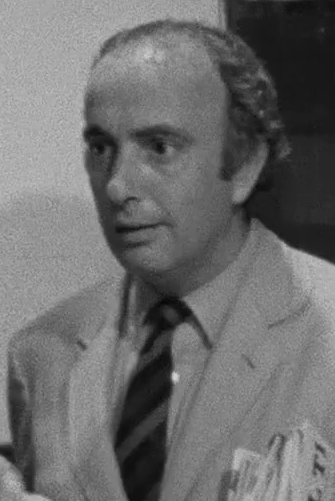
- Born: 26 February 1927; Siena, Kingdom of Italy
- Died: 7 September 2010 (aged 83); Rome, Italy
- Occupations: Film director; screenwriter; lyricist

Piero Vivarelli (26 February 1927 – 7 September 2010) was an Italian film director, screenwriter and lyricist.

Vivarelli was born in Siena. After his father's death in 1942 at the hands of Yugoslav Partisans, Vivarelli joined the Republic of Salò as a young volunteer of the Decima Flottiglia MAS and for a short time was a member of the Italian Social Movement. Later, from 1949 through the 1990s, he was a member of the Italian Communist Party, and was also the only Italian to receive the Communist Party of Cuba's membership card from Fidel Castro. Mainly active in genre films, he is regarded as a key figure in the musicarello genre. He was also active as a lyricist of pop songs such as "24.000 baci", and several hits popularized by Adriano Celentano.

== Selected filmography ==
- Supreme Confession (1956)
- The Wanderers (1956)
- Cavalier in Devil's Castle (1959)
- Rita the American Girl (1965)
- Avenger X (1967)
- Satanik (1968)
