= ¿A quién le importa? =

Spanish pop rock single

"A quién le importa"

Single by Alaska y Dinarama

from the album No es pecado
- B-side: "Bote de Colón (Techno Chochi' 86)" "La funcionaria asesina"
- Released: March 20, 1986
- Recorded: 1985
- Genre: Hi-NRG; pop rock; synth-pop
- Length: 3:24
- Label: Hispavox
- Songwriters: Carlos García Berlanga; Ignacio Canut
- Producer: Nick Patrick

Alaska y Dinarama singles chronology
"Un hombre de verdad" (1985)	"A quién le importa" (1986)	"La funcionaria asesina" (1986)

"A quién le importa" (Who cares) is a song by Spanish band Alaska y Dinarama from their third studio album No es pecado (1986). The song was written and composed by Carlos Berlanga and Nacho Canut, and it was released as the album's lead single on March 20, 1986.

The lyrics of the song refer to freedom and individual independence, regardless of others' prejudices. Although it does not explicitly mention them, the LGBTQ community adopted it as an anthem, making it an iconic song of the 1980s. "A quién le importa" is the most successful single of Alaska's career, topping Spain's main music chart, AFYVE. Additionally, in 2010, Rolling Stone ranked it number 52 on their list of the 200 Best pop rock songs in Spain. In 2025, Billboard named Alaska y Dinarama's version of the song as the 63th Greatest LGBTQ+ Anthem of All Time.

== Composition and themes ==
The song was originally written and produced by Carlos Berlanga and Nacho Canut.

The song describes a person who is criticized for being different. The question and title lyric "Who cares?" is repeated throughout the song indicating that criticism does not affect her and she will stay the way she is. The chorus of the song asks (translated from Spanish): "Who cares what I do? / Who cares what I say? / I am the way I am. I'll keep on being that. / I will never change."

Alaska y Dinarama's version of the song was later used as a gay anthem by the Spanish language-speaking LGBT community.

== Track listing ==
"Alaska y Dinarama Spanish Single"

1. ¿A quién le importa?
2. ¿A quién le importa? (Club mix)

== Music videos ==
The performance for World Pride Madrid 2017

=== Alaska y Dinarama's music video ===
Alaska y Dinarama's music video features a performance of the song for the television show La Bola de Cristal, which was hosted by Alaska herself. The performance was filmed by Televisión Española at its studios in Prado del Rey, and was first aired on the show on 29 November 1986 as part of a concert by the band.

The music video depicts Alaska with her "Rastafari Punk" look (her makeup is green, and her hair is shaved from the sides and is grabbed into a high pony tail with dreadlocks), as she sings at the center of an energetic crowd (whom seem to get motivated by her and support her). In this video Alaska is wearing a silver fringe jacket. This style later inspired Thalia to dress up almost identically to her during her trip to Argentina.

=== Fangoria's music video ===
Fangoria's music video was shot at Benidorm. The video is basically a theater play, starring Alaska using five different sets of clothing. A group compose of 28 energetic people dancing in the "play". This video is a tribute to the New Year's Eve television variety shows.

== Thalía version ==
"¿A quién le importa?"

Single by Thalía

from the album Thalía
- B-side: "You Spin Me 'Round (Like a Record)"
- Released: 15 November 2002
- Recorded: 2002
- Genre: Latin house; dance-pop; techno
- Length: 3:45
- Label: EMI Latin
- Songwriters: Carlos Berlanga; Ignacio Canut
- Producer: Estéfano

Thalía singles chronology
"No Me Enseñaste" (2002)	"¿A quién le importa?" (2002)	"Dance Dance" (2003)

In 2002, Mexican pop recording artist Thalía covered the song from her self-titled studio album as its third single, along with an accompanying music video. The music video for the song was shot in black and white and directed by Jeb Brien and shot in Manhattan, New York City, in the "Frying Pan" ship. In the video, Thalía has a punk look, and performs her song in a gay club. Miri Ben-Ari, who plays the violin in the song, also makes a cameo in the video. Amanda Lepore and DJ Keoki (of Club Kids fame) also make an appearance. The video was first aired in the fall of 2002. In December 2003, Thalía was invited to the Jingle Ball along with other artists such as Jennifer Lopez, Britney Spears, Kelly Clarkson, Beyoncé, Sean Paul, and Simple Plan and where she was the first of nine artists to sing where she performed the song along with her hits "Dance Dance (The Mexican)", "I Want You", and "Baby, I'm in Love". Thalía also performed the song at the 2003 Latin Grammy Awards where she was nominated for Best Female Pop Vocal Album.

=== Track listings ===
Mexican & U.S. CD single

1. "¿A Quién le Importa?" [Album Version] – 3:44
2. "¿A Quién le Importa?" [Hex Hector/Mac Quayle Radio Vocal Mix] – 3:58
3. "¿A Quién le Importa?" [Hex Hector/Mac Quayle Club Vocal Mix] – 7:14
4. "You Spin Me 'Round (Like a Record)" – 3:56

Promo CD Single

1. "¿A Quién le Importa?" [Album Version]
2. "¿A Quién le Importa?" [Hex Hector/Mac Quayle Radio Vocal Mix] – 3:58
3. "¿A Quién le Importa?" [Hex Hector/Mac Quayle Club Vocal Mix] – 7:14

European Single

1. "¿A Quién le Importa?" [Hex Hector/Mac Quayle Club Vocal Mix] – 7:14

U.S. 12" vinyl single
A-side

1. "¿A Quién le Importa?" [Hex Hector/Mac Quayle Club Vocal Mix] – 7:14
2. "¿A Quién le Importa?" [Hex Hector/Mac Quayle Radio Vocal Mix] – 3:58

B-side

1. "You Spin Me 'Round (Like a Record)" – 3:56
2. "¿A Quién le Importa?" [Album Version] – 3:44

=== Charts ===
==== Weekly charts ====
Chart (2003)	Peak position
Argentina Single Charts (CAPIF)	6
El Salvador (Notimex)	3
Mexico (Monitor Latino)	14
Panama (Notimex)	1
Uruguay (CUD)	1
US Hot Latin Songs (Billboard)	9
US Latin Pop Airplay (Billboard)	6

==== Year-end charts ====
Chart (2003)	Peak position
US Hot Latin Songs (Billboard)	23
US Latin Pop Airplay (Billboard)	16
US Tropical Airplay (Billboard)	26

== In popular culture ==
The song was used in important scenes in four Spanish-language Netflix productions between 2018 and 2021. The first was in the Mexican dark comedy The House of Flowers, performed by the character Julián as he comes out both in a recital and in a fantasy cabaret sequence. The second was in the Spanish romcom Despite Everything, where it is performed by the four sisters as they start smoking marijuana in the car at the outset of a road trip to find their fathers, and the third in the Mexican film Ready to Mingle, where it is danced and sung to at the end to show that main character Ana has learned an important lesson about herself and the single ladies have all come to acceptance. The song was also used in the Mexican Spanish television series Rubí as the main theme song; it is sung by Thalia's niece, Camila Sodi, who also starred in the series. In the last episode of the second season of El juego de las llaves, the song was used for the final scene.

At the end of each episode of Drag Race España, the host Supremme de Luxe recites the song's refrain, paralleling RuPaul's slogan, "If you can't love yourself, how in the hell are you gonna love somebody else? Can I get an amen?", in each episode of the original American series from which the Spanish version is adapted.

In the finale of the first season of Drag Race México, the show's finalists perform a choreographed lipsync to Thalía's version of the song as their last challenge of the season.
