= Dance, Dance (The Mexican) =

Single by Thalía featuring Marc Anthony

from the album Thalía
- Released: 2003
- Recorded: 2002
- Genre: Dance-pop
- Length: 3:55
- Label: EMI Latin
- Songwriters: Thalía; Cory Rooney; JC Oliver; S. Barne; Alan Shacklock
- Producers: Poke & Tone; Cory Rooney

Thalía singles chronology
"¿A Quién Le Importa?" (2003)	"Dance, Dance (The Mexican)" (2003)	"I Want You / Me Pones Sexy" (2003)

Marc Anthony singles chronology
"I Need You" (2002)	"Dance, Dance (The Mexican)" (2003)	"Ahora Quien" (2004)

"Dance, Dance (The Mexican)" was the fourth and final single from Thalía's 2002 self-titled studio album. It contains a sample of "The Mexican", performed by English band Babe Ruth and written by Alan Shacklock. The Hex Hector remix was played by several radio stations in 2002 and reached number six on the US Dance Club Songs chart.

== Song information ==
This song was written by Thalía, Cory Rooney, JC Oliver and S. Barnes, and produced by Poke y Tone and Cory Rooney. Also, it contains an excerpt of "The Mexican", written by Alan Shacklock.

Spanish version features Marc Anthony's vocals in the chorus. Both Thalía and Marc Anthony were recording their new albums with Cory Rooney at the same time, and one day Rooney showed Anthony a song that he was producing for Thalía ("The Mexican 2002"). Then he thought it was amazing and asked Rooney for a collaboration in the chorus in order to surprise her.

The Hex Hector Club remix of the song received airplay in 2002. An extended version of this remix (clocking in at 8:48 & is performed in English) appears on Thalia's self titled 2003 album.

== Promotion ==
In December 2003, Thalía was invited to the Jingle Ball along with other artists such as Jennifer Lopez, Britney Spears, Kelly Clarkson, Beyonce, Sean Paul, and Simple Plan and where she was the first of nine artists to sing where she performed the song along with her hits "Baby, I'm in Love", "I Want You", and "¿A Quién le Importa?".

== Track listing ==
U.S. 12" vinyl single (2002)

1. "Dance Dance (The Mexican)" [Hex Hector/Mac Quayle Club Vocal Up Mix]
2. "Dance Dance (The Mexican)" [Ricky Crespo Dance Radio Edit]
3. "Dance Dance (The Mexican)" [Hex Hector/Mac Quayle Dub Mix]
4. "Dance Dance (The Mexican)" [Alterboy Remix]

== Official Remixes/Versions ==
1. "Dance Dance (The Mexican)" [Hex Hector/Mac Quayle Club Vocal Up Mix]
2. "Dance Dance (The Mexican)" [Hex Hector/Mac Quayle Dub Mix]
3. "Dance Dance (The Mexican)" [Hex Hector/Mac Quayle Radio Remix]
4. "Dance Dance (The Mexican)" [Ricky Crespo Dance Radio Edit]
5. "Dance Dance (The Mexican)" [Alterboy Remix]
6. "Dance Dance (The Mexican)" [Fluid Dark Side Mix]
7. "Dance Dance (The Mexican)" [Spanish - featuring Marc Anthony]
8. "Dance Dance (The Mexican)" [Hex Hector/Mac Quayle Radio Remix] [Spanish - featuring Marc Anthony]

== Charts ==
Chart (2003)	Peak position
Greece (Greek IFPI Singles Chart)	10
US Dance Club Songs (Billboard)	6
