= Don't Look Back (Thalía song) =

- Side-A label of U.S. 12-inch vinyl single

Single by Thalía

from the album Thalía
- Released: 2004
- Recorded: 2003
- Genre: Latin pop
- Length: 3:14
- Label: Virgin
- Songwriters: Martin Harrington, Ash Howes, Rob Davis
- Producers: Martin Harrington, Ash Howes

Thalía singles chronology
"Baby, I'm in Love/Alguien Real" (2003)	"Don't Look Back" (2004)	"Cerca de Tí" (2004)

"Don't Look Back" is the third English single released from the Mexican Latin pop singer Thalía's crossover 2003 album, Thalía. The song was written by Martin Harrington, Ash Howes and Rob Davis, and produced by Martin Harrington and Ash Howes; its melody is nearly identical to that of Kylie Minogue's "Love at First Sight", also co-written by Harrington and Howes. A Spanish version of the song (titled "Toda La Felicidad") was also recorded and included on the album. The remix version reached #9 position of "Billboard's Dance/Club Play Songs".

== Track listings ==
U.S. CD single (Norty Cotto Remixes)

1. "Don't Look Back" [Norty Cotto Club Remix] – 7:40
2. "Don't Look Back" [English Radio Mix] – 3:39
3. "Don't Look Back" [Norty Cotto A Little Bit 'O Dub] – 6:37

U.S. 12" vinyl single (Norty Cotto Remixes)

1. "Don't Look Back" [Norty Cotto Club Remix] – 7:40
2. "Don't Look Back" [Norty Cotto A Little Bit 'O Dub] – 6:37

U.S. 12" vinyl single ('Jason Nevins Remixes)

1. "Don't Look Back" [Jason Nevins "Rock Da Club" Remix] – 7:28
2. "Don't Look Back" [Jason Nevins "Rock Da Dub" Remix] – 5:45

== Official remixes/versions ==
1. "Don't Look Back" [Album Version] – 3:14
2. "Don't Look Back" [Norty Cotto English Club Mix] – 7:38
3. "Don't Look Back" [Norty Cotto English Radio Mix] – 3:39
4. "Don't Look Back" [Norty Cotto A Little Bit 'O Dub] – 6:32
5. "Don't Look Back" [Norty Cotto Spanglish Club Mix] - 7:36
6. "Don't Look Back" [Norty Cotto Spanglish Radio Edit] - 3:37
7. "Don't Look Back" [Jason Nevins "Rock Da Club" Remix] – 7:28
8. "Don't Look Back" [Jason Nevins "Rock Da Dub" Remix] – 5:45
9. "Don't Look Back" [Jason Nevins "Rock Da Club" Radio Edit]
10. "Don't Look Back" [Jason Nevins "Rock Da Club" Radio Edit Extended]
11. "Toda la Felicidad" [Spanish Version of "Don't Look Back"]

== Charts ==
Chart (2004)	Peak position
US Dance/Mix Show Airplay (Billboard)	8
US Dance Club Songs (Billboard)	9
