= El Sexto Sentido =

Studio album by Thalía
- Released: 19 July 2005
- Recorded: 2004–2005
- Genres: Latin pop; dance-pop
- Length: 65:52
- Languages: Spanish; English
- Label: EMI Latin
- Producers: Thalía; Dan Shea; Cory Rooney; Estéfano; Julio C. Reyes; José Luis Pagán

Thalía chronology
Greatest Hits (2004)	El Sexto Sentido (2005)	Lunada (2008)

Singles from El Sexto Sentido
- 1. "Amar sin ser amada/You Know He Never Loved You" Released: 17 June 2005; 2. "Un alma sentenciada" Released: 28 October 2005; 3. "Seducción" Released: 10 February 2006; 4. "Olvídame" Released: 12 May 2006

Alternative cover
- El Sexto Sentido Re+Loaded cover artwork

Singles from El Sexto Sentido Re+Loaded
- 1. "Cantando por un sueño" Released: 20 January 2006; 2. "No, no, no" Released: 21 July 2006

El Sexto Sentido (English: The Sixth Sense) is the tenth studio album by Mexican singer Thalía. It was released on 19 July 2005 by EMI Latin. Its music spans several modern genres, such as Latin pop, dance-pop and R&B. The album, which also has a DVD version, reveals a lot about the personality and life of its performer. It brings more mature, demanding, rhythmic and catchy music. The most successful singles of the album were "Amar sin ser amada", "Un alma sentenciada" and "Seducción". Thalía collaborated again with the Colombian songwriter and producer Estéfano. El Sexto Sentido is an album sung in Spanish, except for three songs translated into English at the end of it. The album overall was well planned, well done and played with emotion.

Four singles were released from the album: "Amar sin ser amada", "Un alma sentenciada", "Seducción" and "Olvídame", all of them became moderate hits on the charts.

The album was reissued in 2006 as El Sexto Sentido Re+Loaded in Mexico. It includes three new songs that did not appear on the original album. Two of the three new songs were released as singles: "Cantando por un sueño" and "No, no, no", the latter is a duet with American bachata singer Anthony "Romeo" Santos. The reissue was nominated for Best Female Pop Vocal Album at the 7th Annual Latin Grammy Awards.

== Production and release ==
Thalía was the executive producer of album and most songs are in Spanish but includes some versions of her songs in English. El Sexto Sentido was the most expensive album during its release in Latin American and Thalía set a record for the largest number of interviews granted to an electronic medium, Televisa. The album was produced by Colombian producer, Estefano. The album was recorded in different countries like Brazil, where the percussions were played and Argentina where various songs were recorded with an orchestra of strings and arrangement with the bandoneon. The bases of the songs were made in Miami. In New York they recorded the vocals and the mixings were done in Puerto Rico. The first single "Amar sin ser amada" was recorded in Buenos Aires and it has several remixes.

El Sexto Sentido is a primarily Latin pop and dance-pop album with slight influences of R&B. It contains some ballads (like "Un alma sentenciada" or "Olvídame"), pop songs (like "Un sueño para dos"), a pop rock/tango song ("Amar sin ser amada"), and Latin dance songs (like "Seducción" and "No me voy a quebrar"). She also covered "Amor Prohibido", which belongs to the fellow Latina Selena, Thalía performed the song Live on Selena ¡VIVE! concert in 2005 and "24,000 Besos", a 1960s Italian hit by Adriano Celentano. On the other hand, El Sexto Sentido Re+Loaded (a reissue of this album) included the bachata-ballad styled song "No, no, no" featuring American singer Anthony "Romeo" Santos. Lyrically, it talks about the loss of a loved one as in "Olvídame", optimism as in "No Me Voy a Quebrar", fun as in "Seducción" and even to an extremely sensual point in "Sabe Bien".

According to Diana Rodriguez which was the marketing director for Spanish-speaking artists from EMI Latin America the album was the company's most expensive and parallel release at the time, it was treated as an EMI priority and was released simultaneously in United States, Latin America and Japan.

Four singles were released from the album. The lead single, "Amar sin ser amada", is a song that instantly impressed the female audience, thus peaking at the first positions on the charts of Latin America and some European countries. The next three singles, "Un alma sentenciada", "Seducción" and "Olvídame" became moderate hits on the charts. Even though the song "24,000 Besos" was not released as a single it peak at #83 in Romania.

== Critical reception ==
Professional ratings
Review scores
Source	Rating
Allmusic	2.5/5 stars

Johnny Loftus from AllMusic gave the album a mixed review and wrote that it's "a straightforward Latin pop album, with the requisite balladry (the rousing "Olvídame" really shows off her voice), bouncy hybrid pop (the bandoneon-flavored opener, "Amar Sin Ser Amada"), and exuberant anthems you can imagine the entire dancefloor singing along with ("Seducción," "No Me Voy a Quebrar") but noted that "while it will likely appeal to her die-hard fans, Thalía's El Sexto Sentido is neither up to her superstar standard nor a domestic breakthrough."

The album has also been nominated in both 2005 and 2006 Latin Billboard Awards and Latin Grammy.

== Commercial performance ==
El Sexto Sentido debuted at No. 3 on the U.S. Billboard Top Latin Albums and No. 63 on the Billboard 200, selling 25,000 copies in its first week. The album was held off from being number one on the Billboard Top Latin Albums chart by Shakira's Fijación Oral Vol. 1, which sold 60,000 copies that same week. It also debuted at number 2 on the U.S. Billboard Latin Pop Albums chart.

In Mexico, El Sexto Sentido peaked at number two on the Top 100 Mexico and was certified Gold by AMPROFON for shipments of 50,000 copies. In Argentina, the album attained the same peak position and obtained a Gold certification by the Cámara Argentina de Productores de Fonogramas y Videogramas (CAPIF) for shipment of over 20,000 copies. Elsewhere, El Sexto Sentido charted in the official charts of Japan (63), Spain (41), and the international charts of IFPI Greece at number five.

According to Billboard ’s Leila Cobo, the album was a financial success worldwide and became the first Spanish-language U.S. release with an iTunes pre-order campaign. According to El Universal, sales reached 1 million copies worldwide.

== Re-release ==
On 14 February 2006, the album was reissued as El Sexto Sentido Re+Loaded in Mexico (29 May in Spain, 6 June in the US). It includes three new songs that did not appear on the original album. Two of the three new songs were released as singles: "Cantando por un sueño" and "No, no, no", the latter is a duet with American bachata singer Anthony "Romeo" Santos. The reissue was nominated for Best Female Pop Vocal Album at the 7th Annual Latin Grammy Awards.

== Track listing ==
No.	Title	Writer(s)	Length
1.	"Amar Sin Ser Amada"	Estéfano, José Luis Pagán	3:32
2.	"Seducción"	Thalía Sodi, Estéfano, José Luis Pagán	4:02
3.	"Un Sueño para Dos"	Estéfano, José Luis Pagán	4:00
4.	"Sabe Bien"	Estéfano, Julio C. Reyes	4:14
5.	"24000 Besos (24000 Baci)"	Adriano Celentano, Lucio Fulci, Piero Vivarelli	3:20
6.	"Olvídame"	Estéfano, Julio C. Reyes	4:10
7.	"No Puedo Vivir Sin Ti"	Estéfano, José Luis Pagán	4:20
8.	"Un Alma Sentenciada"	Estéfano, José Luis Pagán	3:42
9.	"No Me Voy a Quebrar"	Estéfano, José Luis Pagán	3:52
10.	"Loca"	Estéfano, José Luis Pagán	4:27
11.	"Empezar de "0""	Thalía Sodi	3:14
12.	"Amor Prohibido" (Bonus Track)	A.B. Quintanilla III, Pete Astudillo	3:02
13.	"You Know He Never Loved You" ("Amar Sin Ser Amada")	Thalía Sodi, Estéfano, José Luis Pagán	3:35
14.	"Seduction" (Seducción)	Thalía Sodi, Estéfano, Alexandra Taveras, José Luis Pagán, Sheppard	4:06
15.	"A Dream for Two" ("Un Sueño para Dos")	Thalía Sodi, Estéfano, Alexandra Taveras, José Luis Pagán, Sheppard	3:59

El Sexto Sentido (CD + DVD) DVD
No.	Title	Length
1.	"El Mundo de Thalía" (Interview in English)
2.	"Acción y Reacción" (music video)
3.	"Seducción" (music video)
4.	"Amar Sin Ser Amada" (music video)

The Sixth Sense (CD + DVD) DVD
No.	Title	Length
1.	"Thalía's World" (Interview in English)
2.	"Acción y Reacción" (music video)
3.	"Seducción" (music video)
4.	"Amar Sin Ser Amada" (music video)

The Sixth Sense (Japanese version)
No.	Title	Writer(s)	Length
1.	"Amar Sin Ser Amada" (Reggaeton Mix featuring Héctor 'El Bambino')	Estéfano, José Luis Pagán	3:21
2.	"You Know He Never Loved You" ("Amar Sin Ser Amada")	Thalía Sodi, Estéfano, José Luis Pagán	3:35
3.	"Seduction" (Seducción English Version)	Thalía Sodi, Estéfano, Alexandra Taveras, José Luis Pagán, Sheppard	4:06
4.	"A Dream for Two" ("Un Sueño para Dos" English Version)	Thalía Sodi, Estéfano, Alexandra Taveras, José Luis Pagán, Sheppard	3:59
5.	"Amar Sin Ser Amada"	Estéfano, José Luis Pagán	3:32
6.	"Seducción"	Thalía Sodi, Estéfano, José Luis Pagán	4:02
7.	"Un Sueño para Dos"	Estéfano, José Luis Pagán	4:00
8.	"Sabe Bien"	Estéfano, Julio C. Reyes	4:14
9.	"24000 Besos (24000 Baci)"	Adriano Celentano, Lucio Fulci, Piero Vivarelli	3:20
10.	"Olvídame"	Estéfano, Julio C. Reyes	4:10
11.	"No Puedo Vivir Sin Ti"	Estéfano, José Luis Pagán	4:20
12.	"Un Alma Sentenciada"	Estéfano, José Luis Pagán	3:42
13.	"No Me Voy a Quebrar"	Estéfano, José Luis Pagán	3:52
14.	"Loca"	Estéfano, José Luis Pagán	4:27
15.	"Empezar de "0""	Thalía Sodi	3:14
16.	"Amor Prohibido" (Bonus Track)	A.B. Quintanilla III, Pete Astudillo	3:02
17.	"Message from Thalia (Documental Video)" (Enhanced CD portion)
18.	"You Know He Never Loved You (Music Video)" (Enhanced CD portion)
19.	"Amar Sin Ser Amada (Music Video)" (Enhanced CD portion)

El Sexto Sentido: Re+Loaded
No.	Title	Writer(s)	Length
1.	"Cantando por un Sueño"	Estéfano	4:12
2.	"No, No, No" (featuring Romeo Santos)	Santos, Anthony "Romeo"	4:11
3.	"Amar Sin Ser Amada"	Estéfano, José Luis Pagán	3:32
4.	"Seducción"	Thalía Sodi, Estéfano, José Luis Pagán	4:02
5.	"Un Sueño para Dos"	Estéfano, José Luis Pagán	4:00
6.	"Sabe Bien"	Estéfano, Julio C. Reyes	4:14
7.	"24000 Besos (24000 Baci)"	Adriano Celentano, Lucio Fulci, Piero Vivarelli	3:20
8.	"Olvídame"	Estéfano, Julio C. Reyes	4:10
9.	"No Puedo Vivir Sin Ti"	Estéfano, José Luis Pagán	4:20
10.	"Un Alma Sentenciada"	Estéfano, José Luis Pagán	3:42
11.	"No Me Voy a Quebrar"	Estéfano, José Luis Pagán	3:52
12.	"Empezar de "0""	Thalía Sodi	3:14
13.	"Un Alma Sentenciada" (Hex Hector Remix)	Estéfano, José Luis Pagán	3:38
14.	"La Super Chica"	Lilly Ponce/Chris Rodríguez/Michael Cosculluela	4:00

== Charts ==
=== Weekly charts ===
Chart (2005)	Peak position
Argentine Albums (CAPIF)	2
Greek International Albums (IFPI Greece)	5
Japanese Albums (Oricon)	63
Mexican Albums (AMPROFON)	2
Spanish Albums (Promusicae)	41
US Billboard 200	63
US Top Latin Albums (Billboard)	3
US Latin Pop Albums (Billboard)	2

=== Year-end charts ===
Chart (2005)	Position
Mexican Albums (AMPROFON)	59
US Top Latin Albums (Billboard)	72
US Latin Pop Albums (Billboard)	20

== Certifications and sales ==
Region	Certification	Certified units/sales
Argentina (CAPIF)	Gold	20,000^{^}
Colombia	Gold	
Japan	—	6,702
Mexico (AMPROFON)	Gold	50,000^{^}
United States (RIAA)	2× Platinum (Latin)	200,000^{^}
^{^} Shipments figures based on certification alone.
