= Cerca de ti (song) =

Single by Thalía

from the album Thalía and Greatest Hits
- Released: 14 November 2003
- Recorded: 2002
- Genre: Latin pop
- Length: 3:56
- Label: EMI Latin
- Songwriters: Thalía, Steve Morales, David Siegel
- Producer: Steve Morales

Thalía singles chronology
"Don't Look Back" (2004)	"Cerca de ti" (2003)	"Acción y Reacción" (2004)

Alternative cover
- Remix Cover

Cerca de ti is both the third Spanish single from Thalía's 2003 crossover album Thalía and the first from her 2004 Greatest Hits compilation. The ballad was written by Thalía and produced by Steve Morales. Also, the original English version was first included on 2002's Thalía album, and later included in that album's English-language counterpart released the following year.

"Cerca de ti" became her fourth number-one single on the Billboard Hot Latin Tracks chart.

== Music video ==
The music video for "Cerca de ti" was directed by Jeb Brien and shot in New York City. It shows Thalía walking along the streets as an anonymous person. The video was released in January 2004.

== Official versions/remixes ==
1. "Cerca de ti" [Album Version]
2. "Cerca de ti" [Salsa Remix]
3. "Cerca de ti" [Regional Mexican Version]
4. "Closer to You"

== Track listing ==
Mexican CD single (#1)

1. "Cerca de ti" [Grupera Version]

Mexican CD single (#2)

1. "Cerca de ti" [Album Version]

== Chart performance ==
=== Weekly charts ===
Chart (2004)	Peak Position
Argentina Single Charts (CAPIF)	7
Mexico (Monitor Latino)	5
US Bubbling Under Hot 100 Singles (Billboard)	4
US Hot Latin Songs (Billboard)	1
US Latin Pop Airplay (Billboard)	3
US Regional Mexican Airplay (Billboard)	17

=== Year-end charts ===
Chart (2004)	Peak position
US Hot Latin Songs (Billboard)	26
US Latin Pop Songs (Billboard)	19

== See also ==
- List of number-one Billboard Hot Latin Tracks of 2004
