= Amar sin ser amada =

"Amar Sin Ser Amada"

Single by Thalía

from the album El Sexto Sentido
- Released: 17 June 2005
- Recorded: 2005
- Genre: Tango; rock
- Length: 3:32
- Label: EMI Latin
- Songwriters: Estéfano, Julio Reyes
- Producer: Estéfano

Thalía singles chronology
"Acción y Reacción" (2004)	"Amar Sin Ser Amada" (2005)	"Un Alma Sentenciada" (2005)

"Amar Sin Ser Amada" / "You Know He Never Loved You" is a song recorded by Mexican singer Thalía for her ninth studio album El Sexto Sentido (2005).

== Song information ==
The song is written and produced by the Colombian Estéfano and Jose Luis Pagán. The English version was written by Thalía.

Literally translated "Amar Sin Ser Amada" means "To Love Without Being Loved". In the song, Thalía advises women who are "heartbroken" to leave it all behind and try not to think of their exes anymore. When she unintentionally does think about him and miss him, she has to recall the pain she's been through, so she will never go through it again.

The song reached number two on the Billboard's Hot Latin Tracks chart.

== Music video ==
The video was shot in a white background showing Thalia getting over her controlling ex-boyfriend after he turned down her advantages while trying to seduce him. There were two music videos for the song: one for the Spanish Version ("Amar sin ser amada") and another one for the English one ("You Know He Never Loved You"). The English version contains the same footage of the Spanish video.

The music video was directed by Jeb Brien and shot in New York City, and was officially released by the TV Magazine Primer Impacto ("First Impact").

== Synopsis ==
The video begins with a vintage radio and a woman's voice speaking in French. We then see Thalia and her boyfriend in a car with the singer slapping and pushing him away. As they get out of the car, they go to a restaurant where they drink glasses of champagne together. Thalia attempts to seduce and dance for him, but the boyfriend brushes her off and rejects her charm. When the boyfriend looks away from her, she confronts him and gets back into the car. Thalia sees her boyfriend in the rear view mirror trying to be apologetic, but she takes one last look at him before driving away. Scenes of Thalia singing are shown, dancing in front of a car, dancing with a microphone and sitting on a chair.

== Track listings ==
Argentina 5" CD single

1. "Amar Sin Ser Amada" [Album Version] – 3:31

== Charts ==
Chart (2005)	Peak position
Guatemala (La Nación)	3
Honduras (La Nación)	2
Nicaragua (La Nación)	9
Paraguay (Hispanos Unidos)	7
Romania (Romanian Top 100)	20
Uruguay (Hispanos Unidos)	1
US Hot Latin Songs (Billboard)	2
US Latin Pop Airplay (Billboard)	2
US Regional Mexican Airplay (Billboard)	7
