= Baby, I'm in Love =

Single by Thalía

from the album Thalía
- B-side: "Alguien Real"
- Released: November 2, 2003
- Genre: Pop; R&B
- Length: 3:54
- Label: Virgin
- Songwriters: Guy Roche; Kara DioGuardi

Thalía singles chronology
"I Want You" (2003)	"Baby, I'm in Love" (2003)	"Don't Look Back" (2003)

"Baby I'm in Love" is the second single from the Mexican Latin pop singer Thalía's 2003 crossover studio album Thalía. In his review of the single, Chuck Taylor from Billboard magazine described the song as "well-crafted song with a super-catchy pop melody and contemporary production".

== Promotion ==
Thalía performed the song on various shows to promote it including Good Morning America and Live with Regis & Kelly. Thalia also performed the song at the opening game of the NBA season in 2003. In December 2003, Thalía was invited to the Jingle Ball along with other artists such as Jennifer Lopez, Britney Spears, Kelly Clarkson, Beyonce, Sean Paul, and Simple Plan and where she was the first of nine artists to sing where she performed the song along with her hits Dance Dance (The Mexican), I Want You, and ¿A Quién le Importa?.

== Chart performance ==
It was also released in 2003 and performed poorly, compared to her previous single I Want You peaking only #20 in Spain, #46 in Greece and #77 in Romania. The remixed version "The Boris & Beck, Norty Cotto Mixes" peaked at #12 in the Dance Music/Club Play Singles chart. "Alguien Real", the Spanish version of the song, did not appear on any of the Latin Charts. The song's remix success on the dance charts earned the song a nomination Latin Dance Single Of The Year at the 2004 Latin Billboard Music Awards where she was competing against herself with the remix of the album's lead hit single I Want You.

== Music video ==
The music video (of both English and Spanish version) was directed by Antti Jokinen, and it was shot at CBGB's on the Bowery on July 23, being published on September 20, 2003. In it, Thalía has fun with her friends, going out at night and playing the song in a club, representing the spirit of punk.

== Remixes ==
1. Baby, I'm In Love (Serban Ghenea Mix)
2. Baby, I'm In Love (Crew In 2 Deep Mix)
3. Baby, I'm In Love (GW-1 Barrio Mix)
4. Baby, I'm In Love (Boris & Beck Club Mix)
5. Baby, I'm In Love (Boris & Beck Radio Mix)
6. Baby, I'm In Love (Boris & Beck Love Dud Mix)
7. Baby, I'm In Love (Norty Cotto Club Mix)
8. Baby, I'm In Love (Norty Cotto Radio Mix)
9. Baby, I'm In Love (Norty Cotto Spanglish Club Mix)
10. Baby, I'm In Love (Norty Cotto Spanglish Radio Mix)
11. Baby, I'm In Love (Norty Cotto Dubmental Mix)
12. Baby, I'm In Love (Dr. Octavo Extended Mix)
13. Baby, I'M In Love (Dr. Octavo Radio Mix)
14. Baby, I'm In Love (Dr. Otavo Spanglish Extended Mix)
15. Baby, I'm In Love (Dr. Octavo Spanglish Radio Mix)
16. Baby, I'm In Love (Maurice Club Mix)
17. Baby, I'm In Love (Mike Rizzo Global Soul Remix)
18. Baby, I'm In Love (Mike Rizzo Radio Mix)

== Charts ==
Chart (2003)	Peak Position
Greece (Greek IFPI Singles Chart)	45
Romania (Romanian Top 100)	44
Spain (Promusicae)	20
US Dance Club Songs (Billboard)	12
US Hot Dance Singles Sales (Billboard); Boris & Beck Remix	6
