= Un alma sentenciada =

"Un Alma Sentenciada"

Single by Thalía

from the album El Sexto Sentido
- Released: 28 October 2005
- Recorded: 2005
- Genre: Latin pop
- Length: 3:42
- Label: EMI Latin
- Songwriters: Estéfano, Julio Reyes
- Producer: Estéfano

Thalía singles chronology
"Amar Sin Ser Amada" (2005)	"Un Alma Sentenciada" (2005)	"Seducción" (2006)

Alternative cover
- Remixes cover

"Un Alma Sentenciada" (English: "A Sentenced Soul") is the second single from Thalía's tenth studio album El Sexto Sentido (2005). The ballad was written by Estéfano and Julio Reyes and produced by Estéfano. The remixes of the song were done by Hex Hector (as HQ2), Dennis Nieves, Jean Smith, and Javier Garza.

"Un Alma Sentenciada" is one of the songs that proves her high vocal abilities.

The remix Hex Hector's version reached #37 position of "Billboard's Dance/Club Play Songs".

== Music video ==
Directed by Jeb Brien and shot in New Jersey, the music video for "Un Alma Sentenciada" tells the story of a hermit woman who lives in a lost city. She lives alone, and therefore she feels surprised when she finds a strange shoe lying on the ground.

Then, she starts looking for the intruder, and she find a poor, injured man. She takes him home, takes care of him and washes his feet. Finally, she falls asleep at his side, and she has a dream where the poor man is Jesus, who puts a little rock in her hand. When she wakes up, the man is not at her side, but the rock of her dream is in her hand. Then, she realizes that the dream was not a dream.

The video was officially released by the TV Magazine "Primer Impacto" ("First Impact").

== Track listing ==
Mexican 5" CD single

1. "Un alma sentenciada" [Album Version] – 3:41

U.S. Remixes 5" CD single

1. "Un Alma Sentenciada" [HQ2 Club] – 7:42
2. "Un Alma Sentenciada" [HQ2 Dub] – 5:13
3. "Un Alma Sentenciada" [HQ2 Radio] – 3:36
4. "Un Alma Sentenciada" [Reggaeton Mix] – 4:16
5. "Un Alma Sentenciada" [Reggaeton Mix] (feat. Chavito) – 3:49
6. "Un Alma Sentenciada" [Salsa Version] – 4:41
7. "Un Alma Sentenciada" [Grupero Version] – 2:55
8. "Un Alma Sentenciada" [Ranchera Version] – 3:49
9. "Un Alma Sentenciada" [Album Version] – 3:41

== Charts ==
Chart (2005/2006)	Peak position
US Hot Latin Songs (Billboard)	11
US Latin Pop Airplay (Billboard)	11
US Tropical Airplay (Billboard)	6
US Dance Club Songs (Billboard)	37

- ^{1}: Hex Hector & Mac Quayle Mixes
