= No, no, no (Thalía song) =

"No, No, No"

Single by Thalía featuring Romeo Santos

from the album El Sexto Sentido Re+Loaded
- Released: 21 July 2006
- Recorded: 2005
- Genre: Latin pop; bachata
- Length: 4:10
- Label: EMI
- Songwriter(s): Anthony "Romeo" Santos
- Producer(s): Archie Peña

Thalía singles chronology
"Olvídame" (2006)	"No, No, No" (2006)	"Ten Paciencia" (2008)

Romeo Santos singles chronology
"No, No, No" (2006)	"Me Voy (Remix)" (2007)

"No, No, No" is Thalía's sixth single from the re-released edition of her El Sexto Sentido album, El Sexto Sentido Re+Loaded. The song features the Latin singer Anthony "Romeo" Santos, from the Latin group Aventura. The song was written by Anthony "Romeo" Santos, and produced by Archie Peña. The song reached number four on Billboard's Hot Latin Songs chart. The song was awarded "Pop Song of the Year" at the Premio Lo Nuestro 2007 awards.

== Music video ==
The music video was shot in New York, and officially premiered on 13 July 2006. In the beginning, Thalía and her boyfriend Anthony are shown happily bowling together. While the video goes on, the two are shown singing the song. When Thalía's part comes, she is seated. Next, they are playing billiards. When the bachata part (the actual chorus) breaks, Thalía and Anthony are dancing, in what seems to be a private room. After this, Thalía walks down to the bar and while asking for a drink, she sees Anthony with another woman. Thalía gets mad and walks away, whereafter Anthony calls her, apologizing for his actions and begging her to forgive him. Thalía does not let him finish talking, and hangs up on him.

== Official remixes and versions ==
1. "No, No, No" (Reggaeton Remix)
2. "No, No, No" (Regional Mexican Version)

== Charts ==
Chart (2006)	Peak position
Mexico Regional Airplay (Billboard)	37
US Bubbling Under Hot 100 (Billboard)	19
US Hot Latin Songs (Billboard)	4
US Latin Airplay (Billboard)	1
US Latin Pop Airplay (Billboard)	3
US Latin Rhythm Airplay (Billboard)	24
US Tropical Airplay (Billboard)	7
Uruguay (Associated Press)	10

=== Year-end charts ===
Chart (2006)	Position
US Hot Latin Songs (Billboard)	30
US Latin Pop Songs (Billboard)	22
