= I Want You (Thalía song) =

2003 single by Thalía

Single by Thalía featuring Fat Joe

from the album Thalía
- B-side: "It's My Party"
- Released: 5 May 2003
- Length: 3:45
- Label: Virgin
- Songwriters: Brenda Russell; Cory Rooney; Fat Joe; Gregory Bruno; Spanish lyrics by Thalía
- Producer: Cory Rooney

Thalía singles chronology
| "Dance Dance (The Mexican)" (2003) | "I Want You" (2003) | "Baby, I'm in Love"/"Alguien Real" (2003) |

Fat Joe singles chronology
| "All I Need" (2003) | "I Want You"/"Me Pones Sexy" (2003) | "Lean Back" (2004) |

Music video
- "I Want You" on YouTube

"I Want You"/"Me Pones Sexy" is a song by Mexican singer Thalía, released as the lead single from her 2003 crossover studio album Thalía. The track features American rapper Fat Joe and samples Brenda Russell's "A Little Bit of Love". It peaked at number 22 on the US Billboard Hot 100. The song was written by Cory Rooney, Gregory Bruno, Fat Joe, Thalía, and Brenda Russell, and produced by Rooney and Davy Deluge.

== Promotion ==
Thalía performed the song "I Want You" on various shows to promote it including Good Morning America. In December 2003, Thalía was invited to perform at Jingle Ball along with other artists such as Jennifer Lopez, Britney Spears, Kelly Clarkson, Beyoncé, Sean Paul, and Simple Plan. She was the first of nine artists to sing where she performed the song along with her hits "Dance, Dance (The Mexican)", "Baby, I'm in Love", and "¿A Quién le Importa?".

== Chart performance ==
"I Want You" became a modest success, peaking at number 22 on the US Billboard Hot 100 chart. The song also achieved international success in countries like Australia, Canada, New Zealand, and Romania.

== Music video ==
The music video for "I Want You" was directed by Dave Meyers and shot in The Bronx, New York. The video aired in May 2003. In the video, Thalía seduces some bricklayers and sings while some guys are playing basketball. Fat Joe also appears in the video.

== Track listings ==
CD single

1. "I Want You" [Radio Edit] – 3:34
2. "It's My Party" [English Version of "Arrasando"] – 3:57
3. "I Want You" [Pablo Flores Club Mix] – 8:21

Mexican 2-track promotional only CD

1. "Me Pones Sexy"
2. "I Want You" [Pop Edit] – 3:46

US 4-track promo-only remix 12"

1. "I Want You" [Radio Edit] – 3:34
2. "I Want You" [Album Instrumental] – 3:34
3. "I Want You" [Pablo Flores Import House Mix] – 8:36
4. "I Want You" [Pablo Flores Club Mix] – 8:21

== Charts ==
=== Weekly charts ===
==== "I Want You" ====
| Chart (2003) | Peak position |
|---|---|
| Argentina Single Charts (CAPIF) | 5 |
| Australia (ARIA) | 25 |
| Australian Urban (ARIA) | 9 |
| Brazil (ABPD) | 10 |
| Canada (Nielsen SoundScan) | 29 |
| Colombia (ASINCOL) | 5 |
| Germany (GfK) | 86 |
| Greece (IFPI) | 25 |
| Hungary (Editors' Choice Top 40) | 28 |
| Netherlands (Dutch Top 40) | 33 |
| Netherlands (Single Top 100) | 30 |
| New Zealand (Recorded Music NZ) | 38 |
| Romania (Romanian Top 100) | 38 |
| Switzerland (Schweizer Hitparade) | 64 |
| US Billboard Hot 100 | 22 |
| US Dance Club Songs (Billboard); Pablo Flores remix | 27 |
| US Dance Airplay (Billboard) | 14 |
| US Hot Dance Singles Sales (Billboard); Pablo Flores remix | 14 |
| US Hot R&B/Hip-Hop Songs (Billboard) | 61 |
| US Pop Airplay (Billboard) | 7 |
| US Rhythmic Airplay (Billboard) | 13 |

==== "Me Pones Sexy" ====
| Chart (2003) | Peak position |
|---|---|
| US Hot Latin Songs (Billboard) | 9 |
| US Latin Pop Airplay (Billboard) | 9 |
| US Tropical Airplay (Billboard) | 3 |

=== Year-end charts ===
| Chart (2003) | Position |
|---|---|
| Brazil (Crowley) | 9 |
| Colombia (B & V Marketing) | 8 |
| US Billboard Hot 100 | 95 |
| US Mainstream Top 40 (Billboard) | 55 |
| US Rhythmic Top 40 (Billboard) | 66 |

== Release history ==
| Region | Date | Format(s) | Label(s) | Ref. |
|---|---|---|---|---|
| United States | 5 May 2003 | Rhythmic contemporary radio | Virgin | |
| United States | 12 May 2003 | Urban radio | Virgin | |
| United States | 19 May 2003 | Contemporary hit radio | Virgin | |
| Australia | 11 August 2003 | CD | Virgin | |
