= En la Intimidad (Thalía song) =

1991 song by Thalía

Single by Thalía

from the album Mundo de Cristal
- Released: 1991
- Genre: Soft rock
- Length: 5:06
- Label: Melody/Fonovisa
- Songwriters: Fernando Riba; Kiko Campos

Thalía singles chronology
"Sudor" (1991)	"En la Intimidad" (1991)	"Fuego Cruzado" (1992)

"En la Intimidad" (In Private) is a song by Mexican singer Thalía, released in 1992 as the third single from the album Mundo de Cristal. The song and its music video caused controversy due to the provocative and sensual lyrics but was successful on the charts of the Mexican newspaper El Siglo de Torreón.

== Background and production ==
After almost giving up on pursuing her career due to criticism received by her first album, the singer was guided by her mother and her then boyfriend Alfredo Díaz to continue with her career. After a brief season in Paris the singer decided to continue and together with Alfredo Díaz began to select a repertoire for her second solo album. Among the chosen songs was "En la Intimidad" which was composed by Fernando Riba and Kiko Campos, a pop rock song that resembled some of the songs from the artist's first release, from 1990. Like the songs "Saliva" and "Un Pacto Entre los Dos" the singer continued to sing controversial themes, this time because of the lyrics in which she talks about leaving "footprints" in her lover.

== Promotion and commercial performance ==
For the promotion of the single a video clip was recorded, directed by Carlos Somonte, and released in 1991. The video and the lyrics of the song caused controversy in Mexico due to its sexual content. In response to the controversy, the singer said: "I do things with a lot of sensuality but with a lot of quality, I don't do vulgarities and leave things between the lines for people to notice and nothing more and that way I leave everything just to people's imagination." The music video was included in the Thalía's boxset La Historia released by Universal Music in 2010, which included the singer's first three albums and a DVD with her music videos from the Fonovisa era. A different music video was made exclusively for the show Siempre en Domingo presented by Raúl Velasco on the Televisa channel. In 1993, during the promotion of the singer's third album entitled Love, a live performance was added to the special Love and Other Fantasies the performance was recorded by Televisa in San Ángel. Despite the controversy, the song proved to be a success it peaked at #4 on the charts of the newspaper El Siglo de Torreón, in both Lima and San Salvador.

== Track listing ==
A side
No.	Title	Writer(s)	Length
1.	"En La Intimidad"	Fernando Riba, Kiko Campos	3:25

B side
No.	Title	Writer(s)	Length
2.	"En La Intimidad"	Fernando Riba, Kiko Campos	5:04
