= Sudor =

1991 song by Thalía

Single by Thalía

from the album Mundo de Cristal
- Released: 1991
- Genre: Latin pop
- Length: 3:15
- Label: Melody/Fonovisa
- Songwriter: Alfredo Díaz Ordaz
- Producer: Alfredo Díaz Ordaz

Thalía singles chronology
"Amarillo Azul" (1991)	"Sudor" (1991)	"En la Intimidad" (1991)

"Sudor" (English: "Sweat") is a song by the Mexican singer Thalía released as the first single of her second album release Mundo de Cristal, in 1991. "Sudor" is the second of four songs in which Thalía talks about body fluids, the others are "Saliva", "Sangre" and "Lágrimas" from the albums Thalía, Love and En éxtasis, respectively.

== Promotion ==
The song was included in the promotional tour for the album Mundo de Cristal, which went through Mexican cities like Acapulco and also in the tour for her 1993's album Love. The song did not receive an official music video but a video was made for the Raúl Velasco's TV show Siempre en Domingo, also a live performance was made when Thalía was promoting her album Love in a TV special called Thalía y otras Fantasias by Televisa.

== Chart performance ==
According to the daily paper El Siglo de Torreón, Sudor was one of the most played songs in Mexico in 1992. The song reached number three in Mexico City, number six in Los Angeles and number eight in San Salvador. In the Notitas Musicales chart, Sudor peaked #9 in Mexico.

== Track listing ==
A side
No.	Title	Writer(s)	Length
1.	"Sudor"	Alfredo Díaz Ordaz	3:15

B side
No.	Title	Writer(s)	Length
2.	"Sudor (Parte I & II)"	Alfredo Díaz Ordaz	5:04

== Charts ==
Chart (1991)	Peak position
Mexico Top Airplay (Notitas Musicales)	9
