= Sangre (song) =

1992 song by Thalía

Single by Thalía

from the album Love
- Released: 1992
- Genre: Latin pop
- Length: 3:36
- Label: Melody/Fonovisa
- Songwriter: Thalía Sodi

Thalía singles chronology
"Te Necesito" (1992)	"Sangre" (1992)	"Maria Mercedes" (1992)

"Sangre" (Blood) is the first single taken from the album Love by Mexican singer Thalía. The song was composed by the singer herself and the lyrics are dedicated to Alfredo Díaz Ordáz who died before the album was released. The song was successful in Mexico peaking at number two in the Notitas Musicales chart. "Sangre" is the third of four songs in which Thalía talks about body fluids, the others are "Saliva", "Sudor" and "Lágrimas" from the albums Thalía, Mundo de Cristal and En éxtasis, respectively.

== Background and production ==
In 1990, while working on the production of her first solo album, Thalía met Alfredo Diaz Ordaz who was part of Televisa's music department, he produced the artist's first album and at the same time became her boyfriend. The producer proposed to the singer when she thought about giving up her career after the severe criticism she received for her first album. About to get married the singer discovered that the one who was considered to be a mentor and future husband had just died and in his honor the singer wrote the song "Sangre". The song was produced by Luis Carlos Esteban and was chosen as the first single from the singer's Love album. A music video for the special Love Thalía was made. It was included in the Thalía's box set La Historia released by Universal Music in 2010, which included the singer's first three albums and a DVD with her music videos from the Fonovisa era.

== Commercial reception ==
Like her previous singles "Sangre" was a huge success in Mexico and according to the journal El Siglo de Torreón peaked at number two in Mexico City. It also peaked number one in San Salvador, number two in Lima number three in Panama, and number eight in Santo Domingo.

== Track listing ==
A side
No.	Title	Writer(s)	Length
1.	"Sangre"	Thalía Sodi	3:15

B side
No.	Title	Writer(s)	Length
2.	"Sangre"	Thalía Sodi	3:35

== Charts ==
Chart (1992)	Peak position
Mexico Top Airplay (Notitas Musicales)	2
