= Gracias a Dios (song) =

Single by Thalía

from the album En éxtasis
- Released: 7 May 1996
- Recorded: 1995
- Genre: Latin pop
- Length: 4:02
- Label: EMI Latin
- Songwriter: Juan Gabriel
- Producer: Oscar Lopez

Thalía singles chronology
"Quiero Hacerte el Amor" (1996)	"Gracias a Dios" (1996)	"Nandito Ako" (1997)

"Gracias a Dios" (English: "Thanks God") is a song written by Mexican singer-songwriter Juan Gabriel and recorded by Thalía. It was released as the fifth single from Thalía's fourth studio album En éxtasis (1995). The song was one of her most popular singles at the time and a big radio hit, peaking number one in many Latin countries.

== History and release ==
Thalia performed "Gracias a Dios" for the first time in 1989, in the final episode of her telenovela Luz y Sombra. In 1995, she officially recorded a new version of the song for her fourth studio album, En éxtasis. After the success of her previous singles, "Piel morena", "Amándote", "María la del Barrio", and "Quiero hacerte el amor", "Gracias a Dios" was released as the fifth and final single from the album in May 1996.

Argentine composer Héctor Abel Maldonado sued both Juan Gabriel and Thalía for violation of intellectual property law. According to him, the song was a copy of another of his authorship, entitled "Cuando estoy contigo", performed in Argentina by Ricky Maravilla. The judge decided to dismiss the case against Gabriel, clarifying that the judicial process did not affect his good name and honor and in his resolution stated that Thalía was never included in the accusations, since she "only sings the song".

The song was a radio hit and was a constant airplay gainer. "Gracias a Dios" was a chart topper in many countries, specially in Central and South America, Spain and the Philippines. It was also recorded in an English version, titled "I Found Your Love". It was included in her Philippine album Nandito Ako (1997).

== Music video ==
The music video for "Gracias a Dios" was directed by Benny Corral. The video shows Thalía in one of her most iconic images, wearing a black leather bustier, a short black wig, and shiny clothes. She seduces and dominates a guy, shaving and using a firehose to throw water against him. It also shows the famous "lighting candles bra".

== Single ==
- Cd Single (1995)
1. Gracias a Dios (Album Version) - 4:01
- Cd Single + Remixes (1995/1996)
1. Gracias a Dios (Album Version) - 4:01
2. Gracias a Dios (70's Midi Mix)- 6:11
3. Gracias a Dios (70's Mid Mix Radio Edit) - 4:00
4. Gracias a Dios (Midi's Club Mix) - 6:15
5. Gracias a Dios (Midi's Club Mix Radio Edit) - 4:00
- Other official versions
1. I Found Your Love (English Version) - 4:08
2. Gracias a Dios (Con Banda) 3:45

== Charts ==
Chart (1996)	Peak position
US Hot Latin Songs (Billboard)	26
US Latin Pop Airplay (Billboard)	8
