= Pienso en Ti =

Single by Thalía

from the album Thalía
- Released: 1990
- Genre: Latin pop
- Length: 4:47
- Label: Melody/Fonovisa
- Songwriter(s): Aureo Baqueiro
- Producer(s): Alfredo Díaz Ordaz

Thalía singles chronology
"Saliva" (1990)	"Pienso en Ti" (1990)	"Amarillo Azul" (1991)

"Pienso en Ti" (Spanish for "I think of you") is a song by Mexican singer Thalía from her self titled debut solo album. It was released by Melody/Fonovisa as the album's third single after the controversies generated by the previous songs. It achieved the album's best performance on the Mexican charts. About 20 years after the release, the song was part of the singer's Primera Fila live show and appeared as a bonus track for the special edition of the album: Primera Fila...un año después, released in 2010.

== Background and production ==
Since the beginning of her solo career in 1990, Thalía started using a flashy look inspired by Flower power and singing lyrics of sexual nature, which caused the singer to be widely criticized in her home country and made many radio stations refused playing her first two singles: "Un Pacto Entre los Dos" and Saliva. As the third single of the album the singer and her label chose the ballad "Pienso en ti", a song totally different from the spicy tracks she released previously, which was composed by Aureo Baqueiro. The song was dedicated to Alfredo Diaz, her fiancé and producer at the time.

== Promotion and commercial performance ==
Unlike the two singles previously released, the song "Pienso en Ti" did not have an official music video, although the singer performed the track in manyf TV shows. In 1993, when she released her album Love a TV special was made and it was titled Love Thalía, after the success it was re-released and titled Love Thalía y Otras Fantasias, for this new TV special a live performance of "Pienso en Ti" was recorded in San Ángel, together with other songs from the singer first two albums. The song was the greatest success of the singer's album Thalía, it peaked at # 5 in Mexico City and # 4 in San Salvador, in the charts of the newspaper El Siglo de Torreón. It also peaked at # 11 on the charts of the weekly magazine Notitas Musicales, which covered all radio stations in the singer's home country.

== Track listing ==
A side
No.	Title	Writer(s)	Length
1.	"Pienso en Tí"	Aureo Baqueiro	4:47

B side
No.	Title	Writer(s)	Length
2.	"Pienso en Tí"	Aureo Baqueiro	4:47

== Charts ==
Chart (1991)	Peak position
Mexico Top Airplay (Notitas Musicales)	11
