= Love (Thalía song) =

1992 song by Thalía

Single by Thalía

from the album Love
- Released: 1993
- Length: 4:20
- Label: Melody/Fonovisa
- Songwriter(s): Luis Carlos Esteban

Thalía singles chronology
"Maria Mercedes" (1992)	"Love" (1993)	"La Vie en rose (La Vida en Rosa)" (1993)

"Love" is a song by the singer Thalía, released as the third single from the album Love, from 1992. The track was released as 12" single with remix versions and a music video was made for the TV special Love Thalía, from 1993. The song appeared on the charts of the Mexican newspaper El Siglo de Torreón and the magazine Notitas Musicales.

== Background and production ==
After releasing her second studio album Mundo de Cristal, Thalía went to present the TV show VIP Noche in Spain, where she met the Spanish composer and music producer Luiz Carlos Esteban, whom she asked for help to finalize the compositions of what would become her third solo album, To this album, songs with many different music genres were selected, like the song "Love", a contemporary song in the dance music style of the 1990s.

At the time of the single released the album had sold over 200,000 in Mexico only and later was certified Platinum+Gold for over 350,000 sold in the country.

== Promotion and commercial reception ==
In addition to naming the singer's 1992 album, the song also served as the title of the Televisa channel special called Love Thalía, the special would be updated months later with more songs added and would be entitled Love Thalía... y Otras Fantasias, a music video to "Love" was made for the special. In the video Thalía appears with two dancers dressed in black, dancing in a purple color setting. A different music video was made exclusively for the show Siempre en Domingo presented by Raúl Velasco, also from the Televisa channel. In 1992, Thalia received the award for "Best Singer" at the Premios TVyNovelas from Saul Lisaso in Mexico City and surrounded by impressive scenography and dancers dressed in Egypt-inspired costumes, she performed the "1001 Nights Club Mix" version of the music in it. The song became the album's second biggest hit, reaching #3 in Mexico, behind of "Sangre" only which peaked #2 months earlier, on the same list.

== Track listing ==
A side
No.	Title	Writer(s)	Length
1.	"Love" (Club Remix)	Luis Carlos Esteban	7:31

B side
No.	Title	Writer(s)	Length
2.	"Love" (Nights Club Mix)	Luis Carlos Esteban	6:52

== Charts ==
Chart (1993)	Peak position
Mexico Top Airplay (Notitas Musicales)	5
