= Nandito Ako =

Nandito Ako may refer to:

- Nandito Ako (album), a 1997 album by Thalía
- Nandito Ako (TV series), a television mini-series in the Philippines
- "Nandito Ako" (song), a Filipino song by Ogie Alcasid
