= Gracias a Dios =

Gracias a Dios (English: Thanks to God) may refer to:

- Gracias a Dios Department, a department of Honduras
- Cabo Gracias a Dios, a cape in Honduras
- "Gracias a Dios" (song), a song by Mexican singer Thalía
