= Nandito Ako (song) =

1989 song by Ogie Alcasid

Song by Ogie Alcasid

from the album Ogie Alcasid
- Released: 1989
- Recorded: 1988
- Genre: OPM, pop
- Label: OctoArts International Philippines
- Songwriter: Aaron Paul del Rosario

"Nandito Ako" (lit. 'I Am Here') is a Filipino song written by Aaron Paul del Rosario and originally sung by Ogie Alcasid in 1989.

The song has also been recorded by Lea Salonga in 1992, Mexican diva Thalía in 1997, Jeffrey Hidalgo in 2000, Sharon Cuneta along with Alcasid in 2005, David Archuleta in 2012, Noel Cabangon in 2014, Regine Velasquez-Alcasid and Pussycat Dolls lead singer Nicole Scherzinger in 2021, and Rob Deniel in 2025.

== Thalía version ==
"Nandito Ako"

Single by Thalía

from the album Nandito Ako
- Released: 7 January 1997
- Recorded: 1996
- Genre: Pop, OPM
- Length: 4:31
- Label: EMI Latin
- Songwriter: Aaron Paul del Rosario
- Producer: Aaron Paul Del Rosario

Thalía singles chronology
"Gracias a Dios" (1996)	"Nandito Ako" (1997)	"Amor a la Mexicana" (1997)

"Nandito Ako" was recorded by Mexican singer/actress Thalía, and released in early 1997. Thalia was very popular in the Philippines at the time after starring in the hit series Marimar, which was broadcast there in 1996. Like the original, the song is sung in Tagalog and was released as the lead single from her Philippine album, Nandito Ako.

=== Commercial performance ===
Thalia's version subsequently became a huge hit in the Philippines, along with her previous album En éxtasis, and it sold over 40,000, after 10 months of its release.

== In popular culture ==
=== Film ===
A film with the same title starring Kris Aquino and Phillip Salvador, and directed by Jose "Kaka" Balagtas opened in theaters on 12 May 1994.

=== Television ===
In 2011, David Archuleta recorded a version of the song for the Filipino miniseries of the same name, Nandito Ako, where it served as the show's theme song. The programme was the second mini-serye by TV5, and like the first one, Sa Ngalan ng Ina (lit. In the Name of the Mother), it was also set to air for only a month. The song was later included on Archuleta's fourth studio album titled Forevermore, a covers album of Filipino songs.

== Charts ==
Chart (2025)	Peak position
Philippines (Philippines Hot 100)	53
