= María la del Barrio (song) =

"Maria La Del Barrío"

Single by Thalía

from the album En éxtasis
- Released: July 1995 (original release); 16 January 1996 (single release)
- Recorded: 1995
- Genre: Latin pop
- Length: 3:55
- Label: EMI Latin
- Songwriters: Viviana Pimstein; Paco Navarrete
- Producers: Emilio Estefan; Kike Santander

Thalía singles chronology
"Amándote" (1995)	"Maria La Del Barrío" (1995)	"Quiero hacerte el amor" (1996)

"María la del Barrio" is a song by Mexican singer Thalía, from her fourth studio album En éxtasis (1995). It was released as the third single from the album and also as the theme song of the Mexican telenovela of the same name. The song was written by Viviana Pimstein and Paco Navarrete. "María la del Barrio" followed the "Thalía mania" success around the world and was a number one single in more than 20 countries. The song is considered one of her signature songs and was a smash hit.

== History ==
"Maria la del Barrio" was first released in an edited version as the theme song of the telenovela of the same name in July 1995. With the success of Thalía's previous singles, "Piel morena" and "Amándote", "María la del Barrio" was released as the third single from her fourth studio album, En éxtasis, in January 1996.

Originally released as a single and in the original entire version in 1995, "María la del Barrio" became a snapshot hit. The popularity of the song was as big as "Piel morena" and even bigger in some countries. Thalia promoted the song in several TV shows, events, awards and concerts.

With the increasing success of the soap opera, the single also became more popular and achieved a heavy airplay and multiple certifications around the world. It is considered one of Thalía's classics.

== Background and impact ==
The song is considered to be a catchy up-tempo mix of pop and cumbia. Thalía usually performs the songs as part of a medley with the theme songs for her other telenovelas such as Rosalinda and Marimar, all which made her be considered a pop princess and household name.

== International success ==
In 1995, "María la del Barrio" was a very popular song in Central and South America before its original release. With the broadcast of the telenovela in over 150 countries, the song was officially released as a single and became a success in several countries.

As Thalia's previous soap operas theme singles - "María Mercedes" and "Marimar" - "María la del Barrio" was one of her most popular songs in countries without a strong Spanish-language phonographic market. It was a number one single in more than 20 countries.

With the phenomenal success in the Philippines, where it was the most played song in 1997. Thalía recorded the song in a Tagalog version, with the title "Mariang Taga-Barrio". It was included in her Philippine album Nandito Ako (1997).

The song was used in All Japan Pro Wrestling as the entrance theme of the "Mexico Amigos" stable, composed of Miguel Hayashi Jr. (played by Kaz Hayashi), El Nosawa Mendoza (played by Kazushige Nosawa), Pepe Michinoku (played by Taka Michinoku) and El Hijo del Arayada Segundo (played by Nobutaka Araya).

== Music video ==
The official music video for the song was broadcast on TV a few times and today is considered a rare material in her career. Directed by Beatriz Sheridan, the video consists of a footage as seen in the opening of the soap opera, but without credits and using the entire song, with extra and exclusive scenes. There’s also a shorter promo clip that was used to promote both the song and the soap opera.

== Single ==
- Original release (1995)
1. Maria la del Barrio (Album Version) - 3:55
- Promo/Commercial Single (1995)
1. Maria la del Barrio (Album Version) - 3:55
2. Juana (Album Version) - 2:50
3. Piel Morena (Remix) - 6:43
- Promo CD + Interview (1996)
1. Maria la del Barrio (Album Version) - 3:55
2. Piel Morena (Remix) - 6:43
3. Piel Morena (Karaoke) - 4:42
4. Entrevista con Thalia (Interview with Thalia) - 15:11

== Charts ==
Chart (1996)	Peak position
US Hot Latin Songs (Billboard)	30
US Latin Pop Airplay (Billboard)	14
