= Thalía filmography =

Performances by Mexican singer and actress

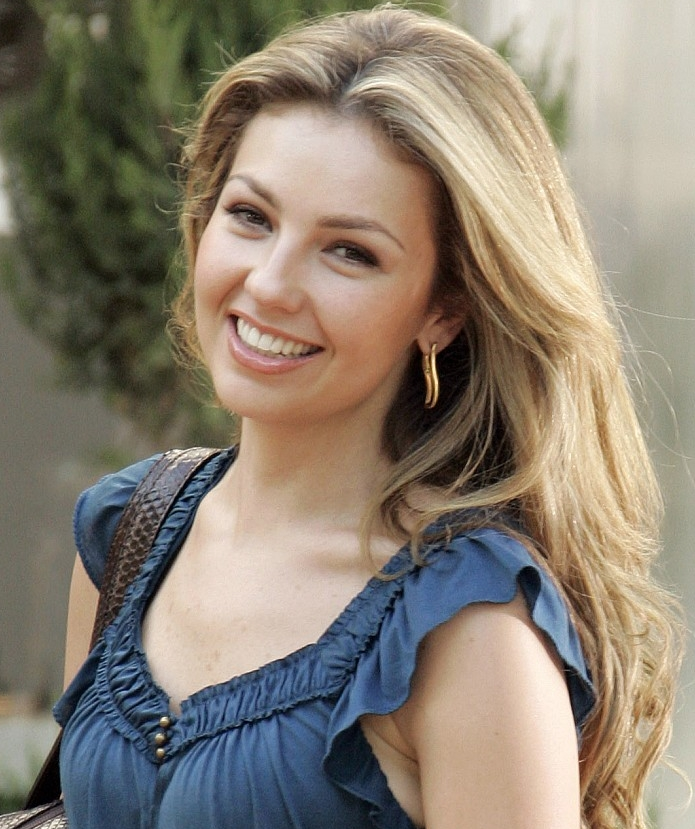
Thalía in filming a commercial for Hershey's in 2006

The following is the filmography of the Mexican actress Thalía.

== Filmography ==
=== Film ===
Films
Year	Title	Role	Notes
1976	La guerra de los pasteles	Girl in classroom	Uncredited
2000	Mambo café	Nydia	First and only starring in film
2009	Las Muchas Vidas de Thalia	Herself	

=== Television ===
Telenovelas
Year	Title	Role	Notes
1987	Pobre señorita Limantour	Dina	Supporting Cast
1987–1988	Quinceañera	Beatriz Villanueva Contreras	TVyNovelas Awards for Best Actress; Golden Laurel Award: actress debut; Silver Star Award: actress debut
1989	Luz y sombra	Alma Suárez	First main role
1992–1993	María Mercedes	María Mercedes Muñoz del Olmo "Meche"	TVyNovelas Award for Best Young Actress; ACE Award for Best Actress; El Heraldo de Mexico Award for Best Actress
1992–1993	VIP Noche	Herself	Co-anchor with a total of six transmissions
1994	Marimar	María del Mar Aldama Pérez, "Marimar" / Bella Aldama	TVyNovelas Award for best rated telenovela; ACE Award for Best Actress; Nomination - TVyNovelas Award for best leading actress
1995–1996	María la del Barrio	María Hernández de De la Vega "María la del Barrio"	TVyNovelas Award for best rated telenovela
1999	Rosalinda	Rosalinda Del Castillo de Altamirano / Paloma Dorantes	Nomination - Viva Israel Prize for Best Telenovela actress
2006	Cantando por un sueño	Herself	Special guest
2009	Las Aventuras de Eebee y Thalia	Herself	
2012	América Celebra a Chespirito	Herself	Co-host
2023	Thalía's Mixtape: El Soundtrack De Mi Vida	Herself	Paramount Plus
2026	The CEO Club	Herself	Amazon Prime

=== Theater ===
Theater
Year	Work	Role	Notes
1984	Timbiriche Vaselina	Sandy Dee	She received a plaque for 500 representations made

=== Music videos ===
Year	Work	Notes
2004	"Acción y reacción"	Also director
2006	"Olvídame"	Also director
