= Fuego Cruzado =

1991 song by Thalía

Single by Thalía

from the album Mundo de Cristal
- Released: 1992
- Genre: Latin pop
- Length: 4:36
- Label: Melody/Fonovisa
- Songwriters: Fernando Riba; Kiko Campos

Thalía singles chronology
"En la Intimidad" (1991)	"Fuego Cruzado" (1992)	"Te Necesito" (1992)

"Fuego Cruzado" (Crossfire) is a song by the singer Thalía released as the third single from the album Mundo de Cristal, in 1992. The song was released after the controversy caused by the lyrics of the singer's previous single and was successful in the singer's home country.

== Background and production ==
After a controversial phase with the single "En la intimaidad" the singer and her label decided to bet on a ballad as the third single of the album Mundo de Cristal. The song "Fuego Cruzado" was chosen, it was composed by Luis Cabañas Aguado and Pablo Pinilla.

== Promotion and commercial performance ==
A music video was made in 1992 to promote the song, which was directed by L. Hernández. In it, Thalía appears singing the music in various places of Madrid like the El Retiro park. The music video was included in the Thalía's boxset La Historia released by Universal Music in 2010, which included the singer's first three albums and a DVD with her music videos from the Fonovisa era. The song peaked at #2 in San Salvador on the list of the newspaper El Siglo de Torreón. The song also appeared on the chart of Notitas Musicales magazine which listed the most played songs in Mexico weekly, it peaked #12 in it. In May 1992, to celebrate the success of the album Mundo de Cristal, which was one of the best selling albums of 1991, in Mexico and the success of the singles "Sudor", "Te Necessito" and Fuego Cruzado ", the singer appeared at the awards Galardon a los Grandes, in which she performed the song and won the award which was given to her by her sister Laura Zapata.

== Track listing ==
A side
No.	Title	Writer(s)	Length
1.	"Fuego Cruzado"	Luis Cabañas Aguado, Pablo Pinilla	4:36

B side
No.	Title	Writer(s)	Length
2.	"Fuego Cruzado"	Luis Cabañas Aguado, Pablo Pinilla	4:36

== Charts ==
Chart (1991)	Peak position
Mexico Top Airplay (Notitas Musicales)	12
