= En Éxtasis Tour =

The En Éxtasis Tour was the promotional tour of Mexican recording artist Thalía. This tour promoted her 1997 album, En Éxtasis. The tour went through Latin America, North America and Asia. Thanks to the success of her telenovela, Marimar, Thalía became the first Mexican artist to have concerts in the Philippines and Indonesia.

== Tour dates ==
1996
Date	City	Country	Venue
July 29	Lima	Peru	Feria De La Molina 96
August 8	Guayaquil	Ecuador	Coliseo Voltaire Paladines Polo
August 9	Quito	Ecuador	Coliseo General Rumiñahui
August 19	Manila	Philippines	Folk Arts Theater
August 20	Quezón	Philippines	Coliseo Smart Arenata
August 26	Jakarta	Indonesia	Unknown
1997
Date	City	Country	Venue
January 17	León	Mexico	Palenque Feria León 97
February 20	Viña Del Mar	Chile	Festival Viña Del Mar
March 13	Quezón	Philippines	Coliseo Smart Arenata
June 13	Buenos Aires	Argentina	Teatro Gran Rex
June 14	Buenos Aires	Argentina	Teatro Gran Rex
June 15	Buenos Aires	Argentina	Teatro Gran Rex
June 19	Asunción	Paraguay	Estadio Club Olimpia
June 21	Santo Domingo	Dominican Republic	Festival Presidente
July 28	Lima	Peru	Feria De La Molina 97
