= Maria Mercedes (song) =

1992 song by Thalía

Single by Thalía

from the album Love
- Released: 1992
- Genre: Latin pop
- Length: 2:48
- Label: Melody/Fonovisa
- Songwriters: Viviana Pímstein, Paco Navarrete

Thalía singles chronology
"Sangre" (1992)	"Maria Mercedes" (1992)	"Love" (1993)

"Maria Mercedes" is a song by Mexican singer Thalía. It served as the theme song for the telenovela of the same name. The song was included on the reissue of her album Love (1992) and was promoted through television appearances and live performances. It became another successful single for Thalía. A remixed version was later included on the digital download and streaming editions of Love.

In 2024, Billboard named "Maria Mercedes" one of the 'best telenovela theme songs' of all time.

== Background and production ==
After recording the album Mundo de Cristal, which earned the singer two gold albums in Mexico, the singer was invited to be part of a season of the VIP Noche program, in Spain, country where she lived for about a year, during that time she recorded songs for her third studio album Love, which was certified Platinum+Gold in the country and it later became in her second best-selling album there, with 500,000 sold. At that time the singer received an invitation from the soap opera producer Valentín Pimstein to participate in her next soap opera entitled María Mercedes. The first edition of Love included only 12 songs. However, as Thalía's soap opera was turning into a big success, a second version of the album was issued featuring the telenovela's theme song as a bonus track. The song was released as the second single of the album, after the success of the single "Sangre" which peaked at #2 in Mexico.

== Release and reception ==
To promote the single a music video was made for Thalía's Televisa special Love... y otras fantasias. The video begins with María Mercedes selling lottery tickets and then we see scenes of Thalía singing and some clips of the telenovela. Thalía (in a red dress) dances with Jorge Luis with many of the characters of the soap opera looking to them. The video concludes with Thalía saying "Yes sir" and the people clapping.

The song was successful in Thalía's native country, it peaked at 10 in Mexico City in the charts of the newspaper El Siglo de Torreón, and number 11 in Mexico in the Notitas Musicales's chart. In 2024, Billboard named "Maria Mercedes" as one of the all-time best telenovelas songs.

== Track listing ==
A side
No.	Title	Writer(s)	Length
1.	"Maria Mercedes"	Viviana Pímstein, Paco Navarrete	2:48

B side
No.	Title	Writer(s)	Length
2.	"Maria Mercedes"	Viviana Pímstein, Paco Navarrete	2:48

== Charts ==
Chart (1991)	Peak position
Mexico Top Airplay (Notitas Musicales)	11
