= Amándote (Thalía song) =

Single by Thalía

from the album En éxtasis
- Language: Spanish
- English title: "Loving You"
- Released: 21 November 1995
- Recorded: 1995
- Genre: Latin pop; dance-pop
- Length: 3:48
- Label: EMI Latin
- Songwriters: A.B. Quintanilla III; Ricky Vela
- Producer: Oscar López

Thalía singles chronology
"Piel Morena" (1995)	"Amándote" (1995)	"María la del Barrio" (1996)

"Amándote" (English: "Loving You") is a song by Mexican singer Thalía, from her fourth studio album En éxtasis (1995). It was released as the second single from the album in November 1995. The song was written by A. B. Quintanilla and Ricky Vela. It was released after the eventual success of "Piel morena", which helped the album sell approximately 500,000 copies in some Latin countries. The song was successful in Mexico, appearing on the chart of the newspaper El Siglo de Torreón.

== Background and production ==
After a multimillion contract with EMI Music in early 1994, Thalía and her new label planned a makeover in the singer's repertoire to reach an even larger audience than she had won with Love, which was the best-selling album in her country, Mexico, with 500,000 copies sold.

For the new stage of her career, Thalía counted on the collaboration of several renowned composers, such as producer Emilio Estefan, who produced the first single from the album En éxtasis, entitled "Piel morena", which became the first song by the singer to enter on Latin charts of Billboard.

For the second single, the song "Amándote" was chosen, a composition that A. B. Quintanilla III and Ricky Vela had originally written for Selena. It received favorable reviews by AllMusic website and by the critic Joey Guerra of the Amazon website.

The name of the album came after the lyrics of the song in which she sings: "Amándote, quiero vivir, cada hora en éxtasis" (translation: Loving you, I want to live, every hour in ecstasy").

Remixes of the song were included in the EP Bailando en Éxtasis.

== Promotion and commercial reception ==
The music was promoted on a substantial number of TV programs such as the Siempre en Domingo program on the Televisa channel.

The promotion of the album also included the recording of a music video which was shot in Miami and was directed by Peter Begman, the cinematographer was Germán Saracco. It depicts Thalía wearing a pink bikini at a famous beach, playing beach volleyball and rollerblading around the city. Then she goes into a retro style and dances with her friends. There is a cameo appearance of the Spanish singer Julio Iglesias. It was the second time that they collaborated appearing in a music video.

The song became yet another hit in the singer's career, peaking at #4 in Mexico City.

== Track listing ==
No.	Title	Writer(s)	Length
1.	"Amándote" (Album version)	A. B. Quintanilla III, Ricky Vela	3:48
2.	"Amándote" (Radio Dance Version)	A. B. Quintanilla III, Ricky Vela	3:33
3.	"Amándote" (House Latino Mix)	A. B. Quintanilla III, Ricky Vela	7:53
4.	"Amándote" (Tapatimix)	A. B. Quintanilla III, Ricky Vela	4:41
