= Nandito Ako (album) =

1997 studio album by Thalía

Studio album by Thalía
- Released: 28 January 1997
- Recorded: 1996
- Genres: Pinoy pop; Latin pop
- Length: 42:14
- Languages: Tagalog; English; Spanish
- Labels: EMI Latin; OctoArts EMI
- Producers: Oscar Lopez; Ricky Ilacad (also executive); Emilio Estefan Jr.; Kike Santander; Juan Zambrano

Thalía chronology
En éxtasis (1995)	Nandito Ako (1997)	Amor a la Mexicana (1997)

Alternative cover
- 2007 re-release cover artwork

Singles from Nandito Ako
- 1. "Nandito Ako" Released: 1997

Nandito Ako (lit. I Am Here) is the fifth studio album by Mexican singer Thalía, released on 28 January 1997, by EMI Latin and OctoArts EMI. The album was released exclusively in the Philippines, where she gained a following after the success of the soap opera Marimar in the country.

The title track in the album was originally performed by Ogie Alcasid. Nandito Ako was a success in the Philippines and received three times platinum award there, making it one of the best-selling albums in the Philippines.

Ten years later, it was re-released in the Philippines with the inclusion of one of her signature songs "Marimar".

== Background and composition ==
The album was sung half in English and half in Tagalog. Ricky R. Ilacad is its executive producer. Due to Thalía's success in the Philippines, this album was released in 1997 in that country and other Asian countries, under the label OctoArts EMI. This was the first time Thalía sang in English and Tagalog.

With this album, Thalía became the first and only Latin artist with an album recorded primarily in Tagalog. It also features five songs from Thalía's fourth studio album, En éxtasis (1995), four of which were translated from Spanish; "María la del Barrio" and "Juana" was translated into Tagalog, while "Quiero Hacerte El Amor" and "Gracias a Dios" were translated into English. "Amándote" retained its Spanish lyrics, but was remixed.

She also made her own covers of the songs "Tell Me" (originally performed by Joey Albert), "Hey, It's Me" (originally by Jamie Rivera), and "El Venao" (originally by Los Cantantes). Some of the tracks that were previously released in Latin America and re-recorded for this album still retain some of the Spanish lyrics and backing vocals (except for "El Venao"/"Chika Lang" which has a new instrumental and backing vocals in Tagalog).

The album, composed of ten tracks, includes her first single "Nandito Ako" which was recorded after her major concert in the Philippines.

== Commercial reception ==
According to the Philippine Daily Inquirer, the album was a "huge" hit in the Philippines. By November 1997, Billboard cited sales over 40,000 in the country according to EMI representatives. During this year, the album obtained 3-times Platinum, making it one of the best-selling albums in the Philippines by a foreign artist.

== Track listing ==
No.	Title	Writer(s)	Length
1.	"Nandito Ako"	Aaron Paul Del Rosario	4:30
2.	"I Found Your Love" (Gracias a Dios)	Juan Gabriel; English version: Alfred Matheus and Joel Duma	4:12
3.	"Tender Kisses"	Viktoria and Rica Arambulo	4:44
4.	"Mariang Taga-Barrio" (María la del Barrio)	Viviana Pimstein and Paco Navarette; Tagalog version: Larry Chua	4:00
5.	"Tell Me"	Louie Ocampo	3:41
6.	"Chika Lang" (El Venao)	Ramon Orlando Valoy; Tagalog version: Larry Chua	5:46
7.	"You Are Still on My Mind" (Quiero hacerte el amor)	Daniel Garcia and Mario Schajris; English version: Ish Ledesma	4:01
8.	"Amandote" (Remix)	A.B. Quintanilla III and Ricky Vela	3:47
9.	"Hey, It's Me"	Jamie Rivera and Jimmy Antiporda	4:25
10.	"Juana" (Tagalog version)	Myrna Stella Turner; Tagalog version: Archie Martinez	2:48

2007 re-released edition bonus track
No.	Title	Writer(s)	Length
11.	"Marimar"	Paco Navarrete; Viviana Pimstein	3:20

== Certifications ==
Region	Certification	Certified units/sales
Philippines (PARI)	3× Platinum	

== Personnel ==
- Producers: Oscar Lopez, Emilio Estefan Jr., Kike Santander and Juan Zambrano
- Executive producer: Ricky Ilacad
- Musical arrangers: Amaury Lopez, Robby Martinez, Didi Gutman, Kike Santander and Juan Zambrano
- A & R coordinator for EMI Mexico: Hector Martinez
- A & R coordinator for EMI Philippines: Bob Guzman
- Cover design: Willie Monzon and Allan Roldan
