= Un Pacto Entre los Dos =

Single by Thalía

from the album Thalía
- Released: 1990
- Genre: Latin rock
- Length: 3:23
- Label: Melody/Fonovisa
- Songwriters: Thalía Sodi; Alfredo Díaz Ordaz
- Producer: Alfredo Díaz Ordaz

Thalía singles chronology
"Un Pacto Entre los Dos" (1990)	"Saliva" (1990)

"Un Pacto Entre los Dos" (Spanish for "A pact between two") is a song by Mexican singer Thalía from her self titled debut solo album. It was released by Melody/Fonovisa as the album's first single and despite the controversy caused by its lyrics, it managed to be successful on the Mexican charts.

== Background and production ==
In 1989, after had two album which sold 1 million each one, Thalía announced her departure from Timbiriche to pursue a solo career. In January 1990, the singer traveled to the United States to prepare musically. At the University of California, Los Angeles (UCLA), she took English, dance, singing and acting classes. The album was produced by Thalía's mentor Alfredo Díaz, who was in charge of the music department of Televisa. The singer wanted to revive the Flower power movement and "to break from anything traditional". In the middle of that same year, she returned to Mexico with a new image and released her first LP on 9 October. "Un Pacto Entre los Dos" became its first promotional single for radio, the song was composed by Alfredo Díaz Ordaz and Thalía herself and it is a pop rock song that was very similar to some of her songs with the group Timbiriche.

== Promotion and commercial reception ==
To promote the song a music video was made and it portrays Thalía in an airport and also in a jungle, where she is chased by some men with spears, bows and arrows. It was included in the Thalía's boxset La Historia released by Universal Music in 2010, which included the singer's first three albums and a DVD with her music videos from the Fonovisa era. A year after the release of the song, the artist performed the song on the VIP Noche program in Spain. The song was considered at that time as somewhat sadomasochistic and Thalía received a lot of criticism with many people calling the song vulgar, people also criticized it for the sensual and provocative outfits Thalía wore on television performances. The song was banned from being played on several Mexican radio stations but despite that it peaked #16 on Notitas Musicales charts.

== Track listing ==
A side
No.	Title	Writer(s)	Length
1.	"Un Pacto ÷ Los 2"	Alfredo Díaz Ordaz, Thalía	3:19

B side
No.	Title	Writer(s)	Length
2.	"Un Pacto ÷ Los 2"	Alfredo Díaz Ordaz, Thalía	3:19

== Charts ==
Chart (1991)	Peak position
Mexico Top Airplay (Notitas Musicales)	16
