= Love (Thalía album) =

Studio album by Thalía
- Released: 7 October 1992
- Recorded: 1992
- Genres: Latin pop; dance; bolero
- Length: 57:38
- Label: Melody/Fonovisa
- Producer: Luis Carlos Esteban

Thalía chronology
| Mundo de Cristal (1991) | Love (1992) | En éxtasis (1995) |

Singles from Love
- 1. "Sangre" Released: 1992; 2. "Maria Mercedes" Released: 1992; 3. "Love" Released: 1993; 4. "La Vie en rose (La Vida en Rosa)" Released: 1993

Love is the third studio album by Mexican singer Thalía, released on 7 October 1992. Produced by Spanish musician Luis Carlos Esteban, it was Thalía's final album released under the Melody label. One month after its release, it was certified gold and platinum in Mexico for sales exceeding 350,000 copies. The album also received gold and platinum certifications in Guatemala and a platinum certification in Uruguay.

In 1993, the album was promoted through the television special Love y sus fantasías, starring Thalía and broadcast on Canal de las Estrellas in Mexico. Following the success of the telenovela María Mercedes, which starred Thalía, the special was adapted for the United States under the title Love y otras fantasías and broadcast on Univision. Love peaked at number 15 on the Billboard Latin Pop Albums chart that year.

== Background and production ==
After releasing her second studio album Mundo de Cristal, Thalía went to present the TV show VIP Noche in Spain, where she met the Spanish composer and music producer Luis Carlos Esteban, whom she asked for help to finalize the compositions of what would become her third solo album. To this album, songs with many different music genres were selected, like a cover of "Cien Años" which is a bolero song originally sung by Pedro Infante and "Love", a contemporary song in the dance music style of the 1990s. It also includes another three covers: "A la Orilla del Mar" ("At the Seashore"), "La Vie en rose" ("Life in pink") and "Nunca Sabrás" ("You'll Never Know"). Photography was in charge of the well-known photographer Adolfo Pérez Butron.

The first edition of Love included only 12 songs. However, as Thalía's soap opera, María Mercedes, was turning into a big success, a second version of the album was issued featuring the telenovela's theme song as a bonus track.

== Promotion ==
Thalía presented Love for the first time on the Mexican television show Siempre en Domingo, hosted by Raúl Velasco, where she performed the first single, "Sangre", dedicated to her ex-boyfriend and manager Alfredo Díaz Ordaz who died in 1993. Shortly after the release of the album, Thalía appeared on the talk show Y Vero America Va, hosted by Verónica Castro, where she performed live numerous songs from the album. A special show named Love and her fantasies (from Spanish: Love y otras fantasías) was exhibited in Mexico and included seven music videos of the album's songs: "La Vie en rose", "El Día del Amor", "El Bronceador", "Love", "No trates de Engañarme", "Sangre" and "Déjame Escapar". After the success of the telenovela María Mercedes, it was re-released for the United States as Love and Other Fantasies, the show was broadcast by Univision and were produced by Televisa in 1993, it included the music video for Maria Mercedes and four live performances of Thalía's singles: "En la Intimidad", "Pienso en Ti", "Sudor" and "Amarillo Azul". Later Thalía's songs "Sangre", "Love" and "Flor de Juventud" received another music videos. They were made and shown exclusively on Siempre en Domingo TV show.

== Singles ==
- "Sangre": The lead single from Love, it was released in 1992 and was written by Thalía herself. She dedicated it to her then future husband, which died before the marriage. The song reached the number five position in Mexico City.
- "María Mercedes": The second single, included in the re-released edition of Love, it also appears as the theme song of Thalía's soap opera María Mercedes. It peaked #10 in Mexico City. A remixed version was included in the tracklist of the digital download and streaming versions.
- "Love": The third single from the album, it was released in 1993. In the TV special "Love y otras fantasías" a video with Thalía and two dancers dressed in black dancing the song was included. The song reached position number three in Mexico City. Two remixed versions were included in the single: "Club Remix" (7:31) and "1001 Nights Club Mix" (6:52).
- "La Vie en rose (La Vida en Rosa)": The fourth and final single from the album, it is a cover of Édith Piaf's song, the arrangement of the song resembles the same used by Grace Jones in her 1977 album, Portfolio. An edited version was included in the tracklists of the digital download and streaming version.

== Commercial reception ==
The album sold 200,000 copies in Mexico in the first month of release and later was certified Platinum + Gold (equivalent of 350,000 copies sold at the time). Eventually, Love sold 500,000 copies there. The album's lead single peaked at number two in her native country. Love was also certified Gold in Philippines and Thalía received its certification in her second visit to the country. The album was her first entry on the Billboard Top Latin Albums, peaking at number 15.

== Track listing ==
| No. | Title | Writer(s) | Length |
|---|---|---|---|
| 1. | "A la Orilla del Mar" | Manuel Esperón, Ernesto Cortazar | 3:45 |
| 2. | "Sangre" | Thalía Sodi | 3:36 |
| 3. | "La Vie en rose" (La Vida en Rosa) | Édith Piaf, Mack David, Louiguy, Luis Carlos Esteban | 5:11 |
| 4. | "Love" | Luis Carlos Esteban | 4:20 |
| 5. | "El Bronceador" | Luis Carlos Esteban | 3:25 |
| 6. | "Flor de Juventud" | Thalía Sodi, Luis Carlos Esteban | 4:09 |
| 7. | "No es el Momento" | Aureo Baqueiro | 3:47 |
| 8. | "Cien Años" | Ruben Fuentes, Alberto Cervantes | 2:53 |
| 9. | "El Día del Amor" | Luis Carlos Esteban | 3:57 |
| 10. | "Flores Secas en la Piel" | Luis Carlos Esteban | 5:39 |
| 11. | "No Trates de Engañarme" | Alex de la Nuez | 3:55 |
| 12. | "Déjame Escapar" | Aureo Baqueiro | 4:53 |

Mexican Edition Bonus Tracks
| No. | Title | Writer(s) | Length |
|---|---|---|---|
| 13. | "Nunca Sabrás" (How Much, How Much I Love You) | Alec R. Costandinos, Luis Carlos Esteban | 5:40 |
| 14. | "María Mercedes" | Viviana Pímstein, Paco Navarrete | 2:51 |

iTunes/Spotify Edition Bonus Tracks
| No. | Title | Writer(s) | Length |
|---|---|---|---|
| 15. | "La Vie en rose (La Vida en Rosa)" (Radio Edit) | Édith Piaf, Mack David, Louiguy | 3:45 |
| 16. | "María Mercedes" (Pista) | Viviana Pímstein, Paco Navarrete | 2:51 |

== Charts ==
| Chart (1993) | Peak position |
|---|---|
| US Billboard Latin Pop Albums | 15 |

== Certifications and sales ==
| Region | Certification | Certified units/sales |
|---|---|---|
| Guatemala | Platinum+Gold | |
| Mexico (AMPROFON) | Platinum+Gold | 500,000 |
| Philippines | Gold | |
