= Piel morena =

"Piel Morena"

Single by Thalía

from the album En éxtasis
- Released: 22 August 1995
- Recorded: 1995
- Genre: Latin pop; cumbia
- Length: 4:42
- Label: EMI Latin
- Songwriter: Kike Santander
- Producer: Emilio Estefan Jr.

Thalía singles chronology
"Marimar" (1994)	"Piel Morena" (1995)	"Amándote" (1995)

"Piel Morena" (English: "Brown Skin") is a song by Mexican singer Thalía, from her fourth studio album En éxtasis (1995), which was her international debut. It was released as the lead single from the album in August 1995. The song was written by Kike Santander and produced by Emilio Estefan. This is Thalía's first single under the label EMI and it is recognized as one of her signature songs.

== Background and promotion ==
After signing a multimillion dollar contract in 1994 with the company EMI, the singer joined to Emilio Estefan to record the material in Miami, according to him the first time he saw Thalia was at an edition of the Acapulco Festival in which "he predicted that he would collaborate with her once". Finally, when Thalía was in Miami in 1994 to promote one of her soap operas Estefan called her by phone to say, "Hey, life brought us together again [...] Gloria and me we see Marimar every night and I have a perfect song for you [come to our studio]". After that, the singer went to the famous Crescent Moon Studios to record some tracks for the album. She confessed that she "felt like the chosen one" since Estefan called her and that after hearing "Piel Morena" and commented that "it was exactly her style". The song was released as the lead single from the album.

== Music video ==
To promote the song a music video was released. Directed by Daniel Gruener, most of its scenes were filmed in black and white, and the most characteristic part of it are the unique bras that Thalía wears, one made of faucets and another one that holds candles, which received a lot of attention and turned her into a 90's style icon.

== Commercial performance ==
The single became an international hit and also peaked at number seven on the Billboard's Hot Latin Tracks. It opened the door of her international career in Latin America and Europe and became a popularity phenomenon in the Latin which labeled Thalia as the "Latina Madonna". "Piel morena" was remixed by The Hitmakers and by Emilio Estefan Jr. "Piel Morena" earned a nomination for Pop Song of the Year at the Lo Nuestro Awards of 1996. The song reached number 1 in Mexico City. Thanks to the success of the song the album En éxtasis sold half million copies months after its release . In 1996-1999 the song became more popular when Thalia was introduced to the Philippine Audience when the Soap Marimar and Maria La Del Barrio were a Primetime ratings success in 1996, and 1997 respectively with ABS-CBN sealing rights to air Maria Mercedes and Rosalinda in 1998 and 2000 respectively. She did a two night concert and was a popular radio hit in 1996-1998

== Official versions and remixes ==
- Album Version
- Pablo Flores Remix (En Éxtasis)
- Hitmakers Edit (Por Amor)
- Hitmakers Club edit (Thalia's Hits Remixed)
- Banda Version (Con Banda: Grandes Éxitos)
- Emilio Mix (Con Banda: Grandes Éxitos)

== Charts ==
=== Weekly charts ===
Chart (1995–1996)	Peak position
El Salvador (UPI)	3
Mexico Top Airplay (Notitas Musicales)	1
Perú (UPI)	1
US Hot Latin Songs (Billboard)	7
US Latin Pop Airplay (Billboard)	4
US Regional Mexican Airplay (Billboard)	11
Venezuela (UPI)	4

=== Year-end chart ===
Chart (1995)	Peak position
Mexico Top Airplay (Notitas Musicales)	6
