= Luz y sombra =

Mexican telenovela

- Genre: Telenovela
- Created by: Paulino Sabugal
- Written by: Lilia Yolanda Andrade
- Directed by: Gonzalo Martínez Ortega
- Starring: Thalía; Alberto Mayagoitía; Enrique Álvarez Félix; Cecilia Tijerina; Eric del Castillo; Delia Casanova; Carlos Bracho
- Theme music composer: Amparo Rubín
- Opening theme: Luz y sombra by Flans
- Country of origin: Mexico
- Original language: Spanish
- No. of episodes: 94

Production
- Executive producer: Gonzalo Martínez Ortega
- Producer: Gonzalo Martínez Ortega
- Cinematography: Carlos Manzano

Original release
- Network: Canal de las Estrellas
- Release: April 17 – August 4, 1989

Related
- Dulce desafío; Teresa

Luz y sombra (English title: Light and shadow) is a Mexican telenovela produced by Gonzalo Martínez Ortega for Televisa in 1989.

Thalía and Alberto Mayagoitía starred as protagonists, while Enrique Álvarez Félix starred as main antagonist.

== Plot ==
Alma and José are two young people who try to succeed and achieve their goals in life, in spite of the odds and difficult circumstances they were born into, surrounded by poverty, economic disparity, homeless street children and substance abusers.

Alma lives with her mother Mercedes, who led her daughter to believe that her father Eusebio died, but the truth is that he left them long ago and now lives with another woman. José, meanwhile, is a boy who dreams of being a great Olympic swimmer, just as Alma dreams of becoming a famous ballerina.

Despite the hostilities they are forced to endure daily, Alma and Joseph don't stop trying to succeed and achieve their dreams, even if they have to go through misfortunes and sufferings.

== Cast ==
- Thalía as Alma Suárez
- Alberto Mayagoitía as José Guerra
- Enrique Álvarez Félix as Juan Guerra
- Cecilia Tijerina as Lucía
- Eric del Castillo
- Delia Casanova as Mercedes "Meche" de Suárez
- Carlos Bracho as Ricardo Saucedo
- Blanca Sánchez as Aurora Linares de Guerra
- Socorro Bonilla as Leticia
- Quintín Bulnes as Guido
- Raúl Buenfil as Satanás
- Mario León as Simón
- Roberto Sosa as Sergio Luna
- Fabián as El Zorra
- Rosario Escobar as Marcela
- Evangelina Sosa as Caridad "Cari"
- Uriel Chávez as Tomás
- Jaime Lozano
- Rosita Arenas as Sra. Orozco
- Salvador Sánchez as Eusebio Suárez
- Javier Ruán as El Costeño
- Holda Ramírez as Mary Tere
- Antua Terrazas as Toño
- Gustavo Navarro as Gustavo
- Darío T. Pie as El Viborín
- Eva Prado as Cecilia
- José Luis Llamas as Urbano
- Alejandrina Fuentes as Gela
