= Thalía (1990 album) =

1990 album by Thalía

Studio album by Thalía
- Released: 9 October 1990
- Recorded: 1990
- Genres: Latin pop; pop rock
- Length: 44:26
- Label: Melody/Fonovisa
- Producer: Alfredo Diaz Ordaz

Thalía chronology
Thalía (1990)	Mundo de Cristal (1991)

Singles from Thalía
- 1. "Un Pacto Entre los Dos" Released: 1990; 2. "Saliva" Released: 1990; 3. "Pienso en Ti" Released: 1990; 4. "Amarillo Azul" Released: 1991

Thalía is the debut solo studio album by Mexican singer Thalía. It was produced by Alfredo Diaz Ordaz and released in Mexico on 9 October 1990, by Fonovisa Records. The album consisted of songs inspired in the 1980s rock, disco, pop, and ballads style. The first two singles "Un Pacto Entre Los Dos" and "Saliva" were highly controversial due to their suggestive lyrics, but were nonetheless highly successful, and are now considered Thalía's classics along with "Amarillo Azul" and "Pienso En Ti".

To celebrate Thalía's 25 anniversary as a solo artist, this album is available in the digital platforms iTunes and Spotify since December 2014. Thalía was certified 2× Gold in Mexico in 1991 and sold over 200,000 units there.

== Background and production ==
In 1987, Thalía joined the musical group Timbiriche, replacing member Sasha Sokol, one of the most popular members of the group and of whom Thalía was a fan. With the group, Thalía released two albums: Timbiriche VII and the double album Timbiriche VIII & IX, both of them sold one million copies in Mexico. Seeking greater freedom as an artist, in late 1989, Thalía announced her departure from Timbiriche to pursue a solo career. In January 1990, the singer traveled to the United States to prepare musically. At the University of California, Los Angeles (UCLA), she took English, dance, singing and acting classes. The album was produced by Thalía's mentor Alfredo Díaz, who was in charge of the music department of Televisa. The singer wanted to revive the Flower power movement and "to break from anything traditional". In the middle of that same year, she returned to Mexico with a new image and released her first LP on 9 October. "Un Pacto Entre los Dos" became its first promotional single for radio.

== Composition ==
The album includes compositions by Thalía, Alfredo Díaz Ordaz, Áureo Baqueiro, among others; with pop rock styles on songs like "Un Pacto Entre los Dos", "Libertad de Expresión" and "Talismán", even ballads such as "Pienso En Ti" and "El poder de tu amor". It was published in the three popular formats at the time: LP, cassette and compact disc. The first edition of the album was sold out just two weeks after its launch in her native country. The album was the subject of much controversy, due to the provocative and original lyrics of some songs in addition to the sensual and avant-garde image that the singer showed at that time. "Saliva" was banned on several radio stations in Mexico and "Un Pacto Entre los Dos" was considered "sadomasochistic".

== Promotion ==
The first performance of the album's songs was held in October 1990 at a hotel in Mexico City. In 1991, Thalía attended the talk show La Movida, hosted by Verónica Castro, where she performed live numerous songs from the album.

== Singles ==
- "Un Pacto Entre los Dos": The album's lead single and Thalía's debut solo single, the song was considered at that time as somewhat sadomasochistic. It was also criticized for the sensual and provocative outfits Thalía wore on television performances, but despite that, the criticism did not stop the song from being a success in Mexico. The song's music video portrays Thalía in an airport and also in a jungle, where she is chased by some men with spears, bows and arrows.
- "Saliva": The second single from the album, it was released in late 1990. The song caused a lot of controversy at that time and was even banned on several radio stations in Mexico. The music video with participation of Ricky Luis was also released in 1990. The song was certified gold in Spain.
- "Amarillo Azul": The third single from the album, released in early 1991. The song was written by Luis Cabaña and Pablo Pinilla. It obtained less criticism than its predecessor singles. No music video was released for the song.
- "Pienso en Ti": The fourth and final single from the album, released to the Mexican radio stations in 1991. The song was written by the composer Aureo Baqueiro. Thalía dedicated it to her boyfriend at that time, the producer Alfredo Diaz. It is the first ballad Thalía released as a single. Like "Amarillo Azul", it does not have a music video of its own. The song reached position number four in Mexico City and number five in San Salvador.

== Track listing ==
No.	Title	Writer(s)	Length
1.	"El Baile De Los Perros Y Los Gatos"	Alfredo Díaz Ordaz	5:32
2.	"Libertad De Expresión"	Aureo Baqueiro	4:28
3.	"Amarillo Azul"	Luis Cabaña, Pablo Pinilla	3:52
4.	"Aeróbico"	Luna Fría	3:26
5.	"Pienso en Ti"	Aureo Baqueiro	4:49
6.	"Saliva"	Thalía Sodi, Alfredo Díaz Ordaz	3:12
7.	"Un Pacto Entre los Dos"	Thalía Sodi, Alfredo Díaz Ordaz	3:23
8.	"Thalísman" (Talismán)	Alfredo Díaz Ordaz	5:06
9.	"El Poder De Tu Amor"	Alfredo Díaz Ordaz	5:11
10.	"La Tierra De Nunca Jamás"	Alfredo Díaz Ordaz	5:30

== Certifications and sales ==
Region	Certification	Certified units/sales
Mexico (AMPROFON)	2× Gold	200,000
