= Saliva (Thalía song) =

Single by Thalía

from the album Thalía
- Released: 1990
- Genre: Latin pop
- Length: 3:12
- Label: Melody/Fonovisa
- Songwriter(s): Thalía Sodi; Alfredo Díaz Ordaz
- Producer(s): Alfredo Díaz Ordaz

Thalía singles chronology
"Un Pacto Entre los Dos" (1990)	"Saliva" (1990)	"Pienso en Ti" (1991)

Music video
- "Saliva" on YouTube

"Saliva" (Spanish for "Saliva") is a song by Mexican singer Thalía from her self titled debut solo album. It was released by Melody/Fonovisa as the album's second single in 1990. The music caused controversy due to the lyrics of a sexual nature and was banned from some Mexican radio stations.

== Background and promotion ==
In 1989, after two successful albums with Timbiriche, Timbiriche VII and Timbiriche VIII & IX, that sold 1 million copies each one, Thalía announced her departure from the group to pursue a solo career. In January 1990, the singer traveled to the United States to prepare musically. At the University of California, Los Angeles (UCLA), she took English, dance, singing and acting classes. The album was produced by Thalía's mentor Alfredo Díaz, who was in charge of the music department of Televisa. The singer wanted to revive the Flower power movement and "to break from anything traditional". In the middle of that same year, she returned to Mexico with a new image and released her first LP on 9 October. Just like Thalía's first single "Un Pacto Entre los Dos", the song caused much controversy for its seductive lyrics and was even prohibited in some radio stations and television in Mexico. To promote the song, a music video (with participation of Ricky Luis) was shot in China and released in 1990. It was included in the Thalía's boxset La Historia released by Universal Music in 2010, which included the singer's first three albums and a DVD with her music videos from the Fonovisa era.

== Commercial performance ==
Despite the song being banned in radio stations in Mexico, it still managed to be a hit in Spain as well as some Latin American countries. The song had success in Spain thanks to Thalía becoming the new musical hostess for La Gala VIP Noche from the Spanish television network Telecinco

== Certifications and sales ==
Region	Certification	Certified units/sales
Spain (PROMUSICAE)	Gold	100,000
