= Mundo de Cristal =

Studio album by Thalía
- Released: 26 September 1991
- Recorded: 1990–1991
- Genre: Latin pop; pop rock
- Length: 50:31
- Label: Melody/Fonovisa
- Producer: Alfredo Diaz Ordaz

Thalía chronology
| Thalía (1990) | Mundo de Cristal (1991) | Love (1992) |

Singles from Mundo de Cristal
- 1. "Sudor" Released: 1991; 2. "En la Intimidad" Released: 1991; 3. "Fuego Cruzado" Released: 1992; 4. "Te Necesito" Released: 1992

Mundo de Cristal (English: Crystal World) is the second studio album by Mexican singer Thalía, released in Mexico on 26 September 1991, by Fonovisa Records. It was Thalía's second and last album to be produced by Alfredo Díaz Ordaz, who was her boyfriend at that time and died of hepatitis in 1993. Mundo de Cristal was certified 2× Gold in Mexico for shipments of 200,000 units. The most successful singles from the album were "Sudor", "En La Intimidad" and "Fuego Cruzado". To celebrate Thalía's 25th anniversary as a solo artist, this album is available in the digital platforms iTunes and Spotify since December 2014.

== Background and production ==
After the success of her first studio album, which earned the artist a 2× Gold certification for more than 200,000 copies sold in less than a year, the singer was exhausted with the album promotion. Furthermore, her dissatisfaction with the countless criticisms received for her new rebellious and sensual image was notable. The singer went into depression and came to think about stop singing. Her mother Yolanda and her boyfriend Alfredo Díaz convinced her to take a vacation in Los Angeles and at that time, Alfredo proposed to marry her. The singer refuses the request but feels she was ready to continue with her musical career.

The twelve songs of this album were produced by Alfredo Díaz Ordaz, who also produced Thalía. Four songs of Mundo de Cristal were originally written for Thalía's debut album: "Sudor", "Me Matas", "Jollie Madame" and "En La Intimidad". The album includes pop rock songs such as "En La Intimidad", "Me Matas" and "Jollie Madame" and ballads like "Fuego Cruzado" and "Te Necesito". "Jollie Madame" is the first Thalía's self-penned song, and it is mentioned in the album's credits as her "first pact with music, on a May 5th". "En Silencio" is a dedication to the memory of her father, who died when Thalía was a child.

== Singles ==
- "Sudor": The lead single from the album. It was released on Mexican radios in August 1991. The song reached number three in Mexico, number ten in the latin radios of Los Angeles and number eight in El Salvador. No music video was released for this song.
- "En la Intimidad": The second single from the album, it was released in 1991. The music video was directed by Carlos Somonte.
- "Fuego Cruzado": The third single from the album, it was released in 1992. The song's music video was shot in Madrid and released in 1992. It portrays Thalía walking on the streets and lying on the grass.
- "Te Necesito": The fourth and final single of the album, it was released in 1992. Like "Sudor", no music video was released for this song.

== Commercial performance ==
Just like its predecessor, Mundo de Cristal was successful in Thalía's native country. It sold over 100,000 copies after six weeks of released, to celebrate the success a Gold record was given to the singer while she was touring in Mexico. The album was one of the best selling albums in Mexico in the first half of 1992. Eventually, the singer received a 2× Gold award for sales of more than 200,000 copies in Mexico, which was given while she was performing in Acapulco.

== Track listing ==
| No. | Title | Writer(s) | Length |
|---|---|---|---|
| 1. | "Cristal" (Instrumental) | Alfredo Díaz Ordaz | 1:24 |
| 2. | "Sudor" (Parte I y II) | Alfredo Díaz Ordaz | 5:04 |
| 3. | "El Bombo de tu Corazón" | Aureo Baqueiro | 4:38 |
| 4. | "Te Necesito" | Alfredo Díaz Ordaz | 4:59 |
| 5. | "Madrid" | Alfredo Díaz Ordaz | 4:46 |
| 6. | "Fuego Cruzado" | Luis Cabañas Aguado, Pablo Pinilla | 4:38 |
| 7. | "Jollie Madame" | Thalía Sodi | 3:52 |
| 8. | "Mundo de Cristal" | Alfredo Díaz Ordaz | 5:05 |
| 9. | "En la Intimidad" | Fernando Riba, Kiko Campos | 5:06 |
| 10. | "Me Matas" | Pablo Pinilla | 3:12 |
| 11. | "En Silencio" | Alfredo Díaz Ordaz | 4:59 |
| 12. | "Blues Jam" | Thalía Sodi, Alfredo Díaz Ordaz | 2:32 |

Notes

- "Mundo de Cristal" features background vocals by the producer Alfredo Díaz Ordaz.
- On certain editions of the album, "Mundo de Cristal" appears as the seventh track and "Jollie Madame" as the eighth track.

== Certifications and sales ==
| Region | Certification | Certified units/sales |
|---|---|---|
| Mexico (AMPROFON) | 2× Gold | 200,000 |
