= En éxtasis =

Studio album by Thalía
- Released: 12 September 1995
- Recorded: 1994–1995
- Genre: Latin pop; cumbia; dance; salsa
- Length: 58:56
- Label: EMI Latin
- Producer: Emilio Estefan, Jr.; Oscar Lopez; Kike Santander; Mario Ruiz

Thalía chronology
Love (1992)	En éxtasis (1995)	Nandito Ako (1997)

Alternative cover
- Bailando en éxtasis cover

Singles from En éxtasis
- 1. "Piel morena" Released: 22 August 1995; 2. "Amándote" Released: 21 November 1995; 3. "María la del Barrio" Released: 16 January 1996; 4. "Quiero hacerte el amor" Released: 12 March 1996; 5. "Gracias a Dios" Released: 7 May 1996

En éxtasis (English: In Ecstasy) is the fourth studio album by Mexican singer Thalía, released on 12 September 1995 by EMI Latin. It was a major success in Latin America and other countries, marking her first release under EMI and her first major international launch outside Mexico and the United States. The album also differed from her previous releases by leaning increasingly towards Latin rhythms.

The album spawned five singles. Its lead single, "Piel Morena", was a success in Latin America and the U.S. Latin market and is regarded as one of Thalía's signature songs. "María la del Barrio" also became popular as the theme song of the Mexican telenovela of the same name, in which Thalía starred. En éxtasis was nominated for Pop Album of the Year at the Premio Lo Nuestro 1996. It received multiple certifications, is credited with solidifying Thalía's music career, and has sold around two million copies worldwide, making it one of the best-selling Latin albums of all time.

== Background and development ==
After signing a multimillion-dollar contract in 1994 with the company EMI, Thalía joined Emilio Estefan and other producers like Oscar Lopez and Kike Santander to record the material in Miami and New York.

According to Estefan, the first time he saw Thalia was at an edition of the Acapulco Festival in which "he predicted that he would collaborate with her once". Finally, when Thalía was in Miami in 1994 to promote one of her soap operas Estefan called her by phone to say, "Hey, life brought us together again [...] Gloria and me saw Marimar every night and I have a perfect song for you [come to our studio]". After that, the performer went to the famous Crescent Moon Studios to record some tracks for the album. She confessed that she "felt like the chosen one" since Estefan called her and that after hearing "Piel Morena" she commented that "it was exactly her style".

The album was released on 12 September 1995; it is characterized by including several Latin American genres, such as Latin pop, cumbia and salsa. According to Thalía, En éxtasis is "an intimate moment in which I wanted to mold my feelings on a sheet. [..] They are extreme emotions and situations that are lived in moments of love [and]" in ecstasy".

The number of songs included in En éxtasis was not the same in all the countries where it was released. This is due to the fact that, at the same time the album was being released, Thalía's most successful telenovela, María la del Barrio ("Mary from the Block"), was being broadcast in all Latin America. Even though this contributed to expand Thalía's popularity throughout the Continent, it also made different people enjoy different songs. For example, the Brazilian version of the album features, as bonus tracks, a remixed version of the songs "Amándote" ("Loving you") and "Gracias a Dios" ("Thanks God"), and the soundtrack from "María la del Barrio" ("Mary from the block"). However, this version does not include the song "Juana". On the other hand, the Argentinean version of the album features, as a bonus track, only a remixed version of "Piel Morena".

== Composition ==
[It represented] a moment of intimacy in which I capture my feelings on a page. It was expressing emotions and situations that are experienced in moments of love [...]

— Thalía, about venturing into composition of some album's tracks.

En éxtasis was produced by the Chilean producer Oscar Lopez, except for the songs "Piel Morena" and "Me Faltas Tú", which were produced by Emilio Estefan and Kike Santander.

The album includes several cover songs:

- "Gracias a Dios", originally by the Mexican singer Juan Gabriel;
- "Me Erotizas" ("You turn me on"), originally performed by the French singer Herbert Léonard, under the name "Sur des musiques érotiques" ("About erotic musics") on the 1987 album Laissez-nous rêver ("Let us dream"), with Spanish lyrics by Thalía;
- "Fantasía" ("Fantasy"), by Gabriela Anders;
- "Te Quiero Tanto" ("I love you so much"), originally by Eddie Sierra on the 1990 album Está todo bien ("Everything is alright"), with modifications to the lyrics to reflect the change in gender, the replacement of various grammatical features of Argentinean Spanish with Mexican Spanish (such as the use of voseo in the original), and the removal of references to Buenos Aires that were in the original (estoy atrapado entre la luna y Buenos Aires ["I am trapped between the moon and Buenos Aires"] was changed to estoy atrapada entre la luna y los mares ["I am trapped between the moon and the sea"]);
- "Llévame Contigo", recorded in 1992 by Argentine singer Guillermo Guido in his album of the same name.

Thalía also co-wrote "Lágrimas".

== Promotion ==
A promotional tour was announced in mid 1995, to start on November that year and finish in February 1996 thorough South America, Spain and the United States. Album's promotion coincided with the promotion of her telenovela, María la del Barrio. Aside her native country, Mexico, Thalía visited countries such as Brazil to promote the album. She planned to visit Los Angeles' convention "Radio y Música" but the presentation was cancelled.

=== Singles ===
- "Piel Morena": Released as the lead single from the album. The song was Thalia's first proper international single release and became a latin classic, topping the charts in several countries. It is also considered as one of her signature songs. The song's music video, directed by Daniel Grenuer, was shot mostly in black and white. In some scenes, Thalía wears a bra made of faucets and another one that holds candles.
- "Amándote": Released as the second single from the album, this song went to the latin radios top 5. The music video was shot in Miami and directed by Peter Begman. It depicts Thalía wearing a pink bikini, playing beach volleyball and rollerblading around the city. Then she goes into a retro style and dances with her friends. There is a cameo appearance of the Spanish singer Julio Iglesias. It was the second time that they collaborated appearing in a music video. The song reached number 4 in Mexico City.
- "Maria la del Barrio": After the huge ratings of the Mexican telenovela of the same name starring Thalía, this song was chosen by the label to receive a proper single release, becoming the third single from the album. The music video consists of scenes from the telenovela.
- "Quiero hacerte el amor": The ballad was released as the fourth single from the album. Thalia performed the song during her TV appearances and it was in the set-list for her concerts that time. She also performed it on an episode of her telenovela Rosalinda (1999). No music video was released for the song. An English version of the song was included in her album Nandito Ako (1997).
- "Gracias a Dios": After the success of the previous releases, the song was released as the fifth and final single from the album and became another top 5 hit for Thalía. It was written by Mexican singer-songwriter Juan Gabriel. The song is also known for its provocative music video, directed by Benny Corral. It depicts Thalía wearing a black leather bustier and a black short wig. She shaves a man tied to a chair and wets him with a firehose. An English version of the song was included in her album Nandito Ako (1997).

Promotional singles:

- "Me Faltas Tú": Released as the first promotional single in countries like Mexico, Argentina and Peru. Written by Kike Santander, the song is a guitar-driven ballad about a person missing someone. Thalia made many performances of the song in TV shows and concerts. She gave a memorable live performance to the song featuring Julio Iglesias, which was considered an iconic act by the Latin community.
- "Lágrimas": Written by Aureo Baqueiro and Thalía, it was released as the second promotional single from En éxtasis. It is also the last song written by Thalia about body fluids, after "Saliva", "Sudor" and "Sangre". She performed part of the song in a music video wearing a green dress in 1994, as a part of her special in "Chabeli", a Mexican TV program. Thalia performed it a few times and also sang it on an episode of her telenovela, Rosalinda (1999).

In Argentina, "Gracias a Dios" was the soundtrack of the soap opera "María la del Barrio" ("Mary from the block"), starring Thalía, instead of the song with which it was originally released in Mexico (and which also became a hit).

== Critical reception ==
Professional ratings
Review scores
Source	Rating
StarPulse	3/5 stars
Allmusic	3/5 stars

The album received mixed to favorable reviews. Jason Birchmeier of Allmusic gave the album three out of five stars and wrote that "En Extasis is the first album where Thalía gets to sing well-written songs over lively productions" and that "there's some passable material interspersing these standout songs, but for the most part, Thalía gets first-rate songs to sing here and consequently she'd never sounded as good as she does here", he conclude that the album "doesn't neatly fit into any one category such as banda or Latin pop. It's dynamic music propelled with bits of cumbia, bits of pop, bits of salsa, bits of banda -- a bit of most everything great about Latin music, in fact." In his review for Amazon Joey Guerra said that "there are a few limp moments on En Extasis, but Thalia is clearly coming into her own as a singer" he also praised the songs "Piel Morena", "Amandote" and "Gracias a Dios", being the first one his favorite song of the album. Colombian newspaper El Tiempo said that only two tracks of the album are good, "Piel Morena" and "Me faltas tú" "thanks to their lyrics, and especially their catchy rhythms, much like the style of Colombian Kike Santander, the author of these songs".

== Commercial performance ==
En éxtasis gave Thalía multiple Gold and Platinum records, receiving many of those plaques in Miami's EMI office in 1997. According to Billboard in 2005, it became a "multimillion seller" record. En éxtasis sold a half million copies worldwide according to Clarin in mid-1996. Worldwide estimated sales stand at 2 million.

In the United States, En éxtasis failed to chart on the Billboard 200. However, it reached number 7 on the Billboard's Latin Pop Albums and number 13 on the Top Latin Albums. It was certified Double Platinum (Latin) by the Recording Industry Association of America (RIAA), recognizing 200,000 shipments within the country. In Thalía's home country, Mexico, the album sold between 220,000 and 500,000 copies. In Europe, En éxtasis peaked within the top ten in Greece and Hungary.

Across South America, the album achieved commercial success. In Argentina, En éxtasis peaked within the top ten in the charts provided by CAPIF, and became one of EMI's best-sellers of 1996 in the country, with over 100,000 units sold, according to Billboard. En éxtasis also made Thalía the first Mexican female artist to have a double certification award in Argentina. In Brazil, the record sold 30,000 units in its first 15 days, and was certified Gold by the Associação Brasileira dos Produtores de Discos (ABPD) on 1997, denoting sales of 100,000 units. This led Thalía to became the first Mexican female solo artist to receive a Gold certification in the country, a feat that would not be matched for 12 years until the release of Anahí's album Mi Delirio (2009). The album also made Thalía the biggest-selling Mexican female act in Brazil, according to Billboard. Elsewhere, the album reached the number one in Paraguay.

== Bailando en éxtasis ==
A special edition, titled Bailando en éxtasis (Dancing in Ecstasy) was released in 1996 by EMI, which contained only the remixed versions of most popular's album track list, and a karaoke version of "Piel Morena". It was a limited edition, not available in Latin American countries such as Argentina, for instance.

== Recognition ==
Described as the album that propelled Thalía's international music career, ahead of its release, Lili Estefan called her in Vista the most popular hispanic artist at that moment. In 2001, Billboard commented, a string of successful albums, notably En éxtasis, have defined her musically and established her as a force to be reckoned with in the Latin market. Similarly, El Nuevo Herald credited En éxtasis to establish Thalía in the rise of Latin pop scene of the 1990s. To author of Juglares Hispanoamericanos: Datos Breves de Autores (2005), En éxtasis was the confirmation of her talent.

=== Accolades ===
Award	Year	Category	Result	Ref.
Lo Nuestro Awards	1996	Pop Album of the Year	Nominated	
ACE Award (Argentina)	1997	Latin Tropical — Female Artist	Won	
New York Latin ACE Awards	1997	Female Latin Album	Nominated	

In 2002, "Piel Morena" won the poll of the best all-time Spanish song in the United States by Univision.

== Track listing ==
No.	Title	Writer(s)	Length
1.	"Piel Morena"	Kike Santander	4:42
2.	"Juana"	Myra Stella Turner	2:49
3.	"Quiero hacerte el amor"	Daniel García, Mario Schajris	4:01
4.	"Amándote"	A. B. Quintanilla III, Ricky Vela	3:48
5.	"Llévame Contigo"	Adrian Posse, Rolando Hernández	3:42
6.	"Me Erotizas"	Vline Buggy, Julien Lepers, Thalía	4:59
7.	"Gracias a Dios"	Juan Gabriel	4:02
8.	"Lágrimas"	Aureo Baqueiro, Thalía	4:30
9.	"Te Quiero Tanto"	Eddie Sierra	3:11
10.	"Te Dejé la Puerta Abierta"	Adrian Posee, B.B. Muñoz	3:08
11.	"Fantasía"	Gabriela Anders	4:17
12.	"Me Faltas Tú"	Santander	5:11
13.	"Piel Morena" (Pablo Flores Remix)	Santander	6:42

Bonus Track
No.	Title	Writer(s)	Length
14.	"María la del Barrio"	Viviana Pímstein, Paco Navarrete	3:55

Remastered Edition Bonus Tracks
No.	Title	Writer(s)	Length
15.	"Piel Morena" (Hitmakers Remix)	Kike Santander	5:14
16.	"Piel Morena" (Emilio Mix)	Kike Santander	4:43
17.	"Piel Morena" (Instrumental)	Kike Santander	4:43

Bailando En Éxtasis
No.	Title	Writer(s)	Length
1.	"Piel Morena" (Club Remix)	Kike Santander	6:43
2.	"Amándote" (House Latino Mix)	A. B. Quintanilla III, Ricky Vela	7:53
3.	"Gracias A Dios" (Midi's Club Mix)	Juan Gabriel	4:00
4.	"María la del Barrio" (Album Version)	Viviana Pímstein, Paco Navarrete	3:53
5.	"Juana" (Album Version)	Myra Stella Turner	2:49
6.	"Amándote" (Radio Mix)	A. B. Quintanilla III, Ricky Vela	3:33
7.	"Gracias a Dios" (Midi's Radio Mix)	Juan Gabriel	4:00
8.	"Amándote" (TapatiMix)	A. B. Quintanilla III, Ricky Vela	4:41
9.	"Gracias a Dios" (70's Midi Club Mix)	Juan Gabriel	6:11

== Charts ==
=== Weekly charts ===
Chart (1995–2001)	Peak position
Argentine Albums (CAPIF)	8
Brazilian Albums (Brazil Top 50)	14
Greek International Albums (IFPI Greece)	5
Hungarian Albums (MAHASZ)	7
Paraguay (IFPI)	1
US Top Latin Albums (Billboard)	13
US Latin Pop Albums (Billboard)	7

=== Year-end charts ===
Chart (1996)	Peak position
US Top Latin Albums (Billboard)	25

Chart (2001)	Peak position
Hungarian Albums Chart	76

== Certifications and sales ==
Region	Certification	Certified units/sales
Argentina	—	130,000
Brazil (Pro-Música Brasil)	Gold	190,000
Chile	Gold	15,000
Mexico (AMPROFON)	2× Gold	500,000
Philippines (PARI)	Platinum	40,000
United States (RIAA)	2× Platinum (Latin)	300,000
Uruguay	Gold	
Summaries
Worldwide	—	2,000,000

== Credits ==
- Thalía – vocals
- Gabriela Anders – background vocals
- Edwin Bonilla – bongos, conga, maracas, timbales, tambora timbal
- Francisco Centeno – bass
- Doris Eugenio – vocals, background vocals
- Steve Ferrone – drums
- Sammy Figueroa – percussion
- Eddy Ganz – background vocals
- Didi Gutman – piano, keyboards
- Jeff Kievit – trumpet
- Amaury Lopez – background vocals
- Juanito Marquez – guitar
- Bobby Martinez – saxophone
- Archie Pena – drums
- Nicki Richards – background vocals
- Kike Santander – bass, guitar, percussion, background vocals
- Ira Siegel – guitar
- Dana Teboe – trombone
- Lori-Ann Velez – background vocals
- Francisco "STAR" Del - drum machine and keyboards

=== Production ===
- Marcelo Añez – assistant engineer
- Scott Canto – assistant engineer
- Sean Chambers – assistant engineer
- David Dachinger – engineer, mixing
- Pablo Flores – remixing
- Don Grossinger – mastering
- Scott Perry – engineer
- Mario Ruíz – executive producer
- Eric Schilling – engineer
- Ted Stein – engineer

== See also ==
- 1995 in Latin music
- List of best-selling Latin albums
