= Thalía =

Mexican singer and actress (born 1971)

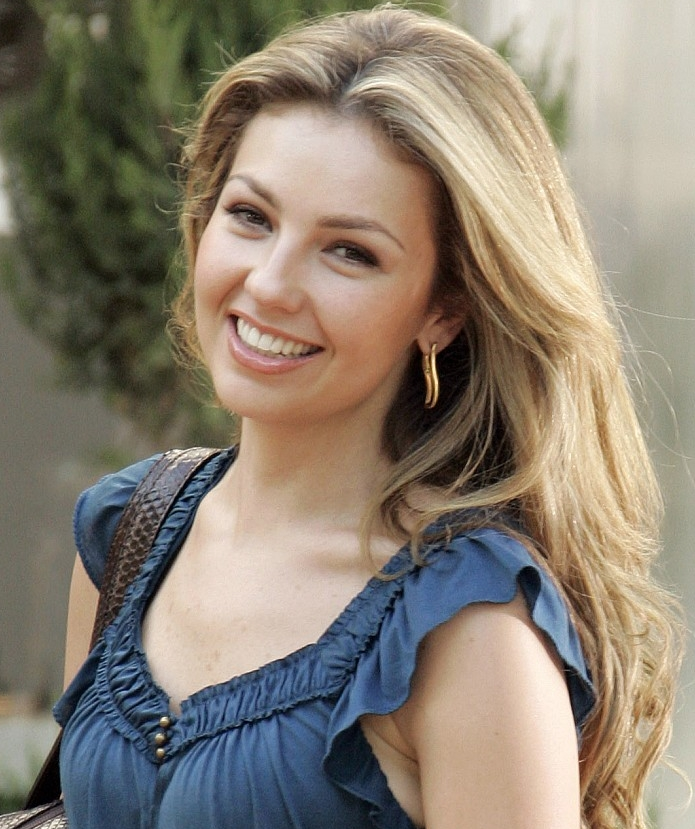
- Thalía in 2006
- Born: Ariadna Thalía Sodi Miranda; 26 August 1971 (age 55); Mexico City, Mexico
- Other names: Thalía Sodi; Lady T
- Citizenship: Mexico (1971–present); United States (2006–present)
- Occupations: Singer; actress; businesswoman
- Years active: 1981–present (singer); 1986–present (actress)
- Spouse: Tommy Mottola (m. 2000)
- Children: 2
- Relatives: Laura Zapata (half-sister); Camila Sodi (niece)
- Family: Sodi
- Awards: Full list
- Musical career
- Genre: Latin pop
- Labels: Fonovisa; EMI Latin; Virgin; Sony Latin; Sony BMG
- Formerly of: Timbiriche
- Website: thalia.com

Ariadna Thalía Sodi Miranda (Note: Spanish pronunciation: /aˈɾjaðna taˈli.a ˈsoði miˈɾanda/) (born 26 August 1971) is a Mexican singer and actress. Recognized for her enduring influence on Spanish-language music and television, she has been dubbed the "Queen of Latin Pop" and the "Queen of Telenovelas". Considered a Latin pop icon, Billboard has ranked her among the greatest Latin music artists of all time.

Thalía rose to fame in 1987 as a member of Timbiriche, one of the most influential Mexican pop groups of the era. That same year, she began her acting career by co-starring in the teen telenovela Quinceañera (1987). After leaving the group in 1989, she made her leading acting debut in Luz y Sombra, and launched her solo music career with Thalía (1990), Mundo de Cristal (1991), and Love (1992), all of which were commercially successful in Mexico. She later gained international recognition through the "María Trilogy"—María Mercedes (1992), Marimar (1994), and María la del Barrio (1995)—as well as Rosalinda (1999).

She further established her international music career with En Éxtasis (1995), Amor a la Mexicana (1997), and Arrasando (2000), all among the best-selling Latin albums. In the following years, she continued her success with Thalía (2002), her English-language album Thalía (2003), El Sexto Sentido (2006), and the live album Primera Fila (2009), one of the best-selling albums in Mexico. According to UNICEF, her telenovelas have aired in 180 countries and reached an estimated audience of 2 billion people. She is also the highest-paid actress in Televisa's history, and Billboard named her the world's most recognized telenovela star.

Thalía is one of the best-selling Latin music artists of all time, with more than 25 million records sold worldwide. Her accolades include six Billboard Latin Music Awards, eight Lo Nuestro Awards, the Latin Recording Academy's President's Merit Award, and a star on the Hollywood Walk of Fame. Outside her entertainment career, she has also found success in fashion through a partnership with Macy's. In addition, she has hosted a nationally syndicated radio show and authored four books, including a memoir. She has also been involved in humanitarian work, serving as a UNICEF Mexico Goodwill Ambassador since 2016.

== Early life ==
Thalía was born on 26 August 1971 in Mexico City. She is the youngest of five daughters of Yolanda Miranda Mange (d. 2011), a painter who was Thalía's manager from 1980 to 1999 and Ernesto Sodi Pallares (d. 1977), a scientist, doctor of pathology, criminologist and writer. Her father's paternal grandfather, who was born in Florence, Italy, emigrated to Mexico during the Italian diaspora. Her four sisters are Laura Zapata (daughter of Guillermo Zapata Pérez de Utrera), Federica, Gabriela and Ernestina Sodi.

When she turned one, Thalía appeared in her first TV commercial in Mexico. At the age of four, she began taking ballet and piano classes at the Conservatorio Nacional de Música (Mexico). Her father suffered from diabetes and died in 1977 when Thalía was six years old.

Years later, Thalía admitted publicly that her father's death had traumatized her drastically, since she had lost her voice for a whole year. This led to her being diagnosed with childhood disintegrative disorder (CDH), which belongs to a series of developmental disorders related to autism spectrum. She has said that she had psychological therapy for few years. She has reportedly mentioned that she was a victim of bullying as a child because of the loss of her father.

Thalía attended Lycée Franco-Mexicain elementary school, where she learned to speak French fluently at a very young age. In 1976, a year before her father's death, she had a guest appearance in the Mexican film La guerra de los pasteles ("War of Cakes"), although her name doesn't appear in the film credits.

== Music career ==
=== 1981–1989: Career beginnings and the Timbiriche era ===
In 1981, when Thalía was nine years old, she was incorporated as a vocalist in a children's group named Pac Man, which was formed to participate in a popular music festival known as Juguemos a cantar ("Let's play like we're singing"), a TV program by Televisa. Later, Pac Man changed their band name to "Din-Din". Thalía performed various times along with Din-Din in occasional events and parties, touring all over Mexico. The band recorded a total of 4 studio albums between 1982 and 1983 (En acción, Recordando el Rock and Roll, Somos alguien muy especial and Pitubailando), and later it was disbanded. (Note: Attributed to multiple references:)

After Din-Din broke up in 1984, Thalía participated as a solo artist in two annual music festivals of Juguemos a cantar. In 1984, she placed second there with her interpretation of "Moderna niña del rock" ("Modern rock girl"); this brought her the opportunity to participate in the chorus of the popular musical Vaselina, a child version of the successful musical Grease, in which the band Timbiriche was acting and singing. The line-up of the band consisted of Sasha Sökol, Benny Ibarra, Erik Rubín, Diego Schoening, Mariana Garza and Paulina Rubio. Timbiriche was highly promoted at the time by Televisa, one of the most massive media enterprises globally and the most important in the Spanish-speaking world. Some time later, Thalía obtained the protagonist role of Sandy Dee in the musical, and she performed in 500 theater presentations of Vaselina along with Timbiriche.

In 1986, after the departure of Sasha Sökol from Timbiriche, Thalía became a member of the band. By that time, Timbiriche had already recorded five albums. In 1987, she made her TV acting debut in an episode of the telenovela Pobre señorita Limantour. In the same year, she recorded with Timbiriche the principal theme of the juvenile telenovela Quinceañera ("Fifteen-year-old"), in which Thalía was the co-protagonist with the role of Beatriz. The TV series was awarded as the "Best telenovela" by "Premios TVyNovelas" in 1988 and Thalía was awarded as "the best new actress of 1988".

With Timbiriche, Thalía recorded four studio albums: Timbiriche VII (1987), the double album Timbiriche VIII & IX (1988) and Los clásicos de Timbiriche (1989). The last one is a compilation of the band's greatest hits, recorded originally in 1987, with new symphonic arrangements as it included the participation of Mexico's philharmonic orchestra. In 1989, Thalía departed from Timbiriche. In that year, she also starred in another TV series, Luz y sombra ("Light and shadow"), which was her first protagonist role. Some time later she visited Los Angeles to take English courses in the University of California. She also attended music, singing, acting and dancing classes before beginning her career as a solo artist.

=== 1990–1993: First albums as a solo artist ===
In 1990, Thalía returned to Mexico and released her first studio album as a solo artist, self-titled Thalía, which was produced by Alfredo Díaz Ordaz, and published by Fonovisa, Televisa's record label. From that album, she released a total of four singles that became radio hits: "Amarillo Azul", "Pienso en Ti", "Un Pacto Entre los Dos" and "Saliva". The last two tracks were co-written by her and Díaz Ordaz and they were considered as provocative at the time ("Un Pacto Entre Los Dos" was even labeled as a song with occult Satan-worship lyrics by various far-right parties).

In September 1991, Thalía released her second studio album, Mundo de cristal, which marks Thalía's last project in collaboration with Alfredo Díaz Ordaz. Four songs became radio singles from the album, and all of them had big radio impact in Mexico. Due to the success of the singles, the album was certified as double gold in Thalía's native country, Mexico. In the same year, Thalía was co-presenter of the late Spanish show VIP Noche, along with Spanish presenter Emilio Aragón, produced by Telecinco.

In October 1992, she released her third studio album and her last under the same label, entitled Love, which was recorded in Spain and was produced by Luis Carlos Esteban. The album spread six singles, that had huge radio impact: "Sangre", "Love", "María Mercedes" (official theme of the TV series), "No Trates de Engañarme", "Flor de Juventud", and "La Vida en Rosa" (La vie en rose), the last one being a Spanish-French cover of the classic French song originally performed by Edith Piaf. Thalía wrote the song "Sangre" inspired in Díaz Ordaz, with whom she had broken up her sentimental relation. The album was praised by the critics, as it was an artistic evolution for Thalía, who experimented for the first time in different music genres, especially electronic music. The album reached number 15 on Billboard's Latin Pop Albums in 1993. In Mexico, it sold over 200,000 copies in the first month upon its release and very soon it reached the platinum and gold certification. Thalia got the opportunity to be on stage with Michael Jackson during the Dangerous World Tour in all the Mexico City concerts.

=== 1994–1999: International breakout ===
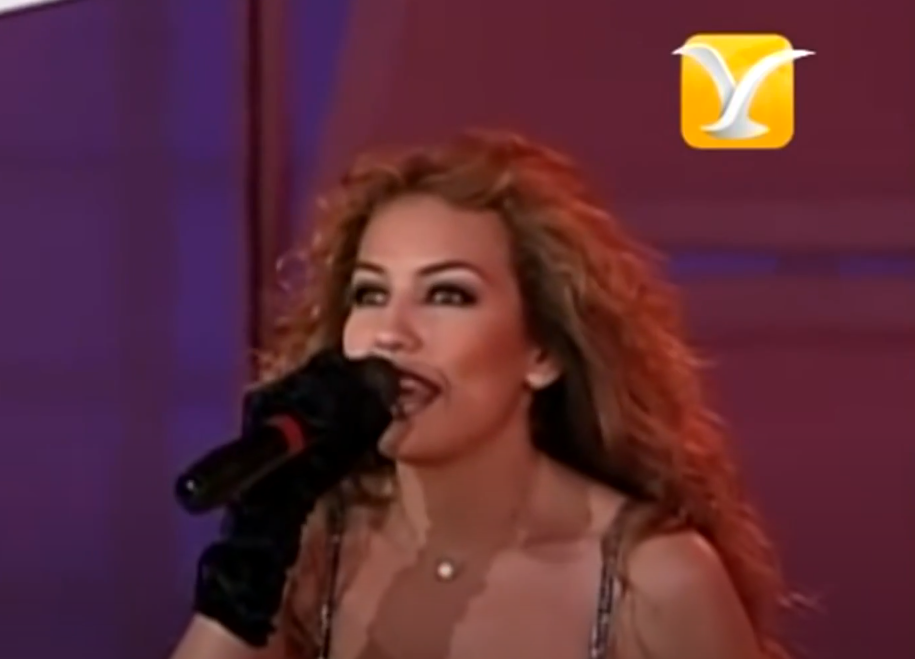
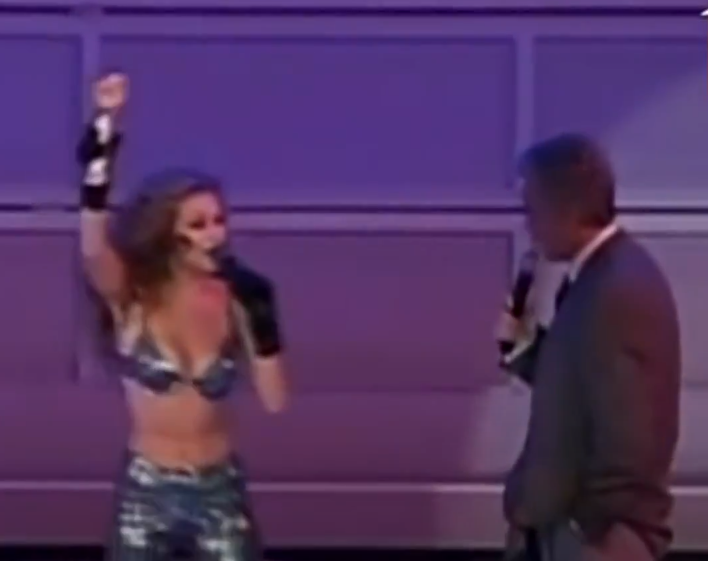
Thalía crowned as Queen of the 1997 Viña del Mar International Song Festival

In 1994, during the successful transmission of Marimar, Thalía signed a contract with the record label EMI to prepare her fourth studio album that was entitled En éxtasis. The album was released in October 1995. En éxtasis was produced with the aid of celebrated producers such as Emilio Estefan, Jr. (husband of the famous Cuban singer Gloria Estefan) and Óscar López. The album spawned a total of seven singles including "Piel morena", "Amándote", "María la del barrio", "Quiero hacerte el amor", "Gracias a Dios, "Me Faltas Tú" and "Lágrimas". Piel morena became a huge international hit apart from being voted as the best Spanish song ever in the United States from a poll released by mass media company Univision. It must also be added that Thalía was more oriented to the latin pop music genre in that album, even though it was influenced by various music genres. Amandote became a number 1 hit in various radio stations in the Philippines in 1996, along with her phenomenal superstardom accompanied by her historic Manila tour. It was described by Philippine media as tantamount to that of Pope John Paul II's 1995 Manila visit. The broadcast of the telenovelas María Mercedes, Marimar and María la del barrio had already converted Thalía to a global television phenomenon by the end of 1996. In January 1997, she released her first compilation album entitled Nandito Ako, which contains four songs recorded in Filipino, five English versions from various tracks from the album En éxtasis and a Spanish remix of the song Amándote. The only single that was released from this album was Nandito Ako. The album became a commercial success in the Philippines as a result of Thalía's growing popularity. En éxtasis was her first album that was released worldwide, reaching gold, and platinum in various countries.

In July 1997, Thalía's fifth studio album was released, under the title Amor a la mexicana, produced again by Emilio Estefan, and including songs that became classic over the years like "Mujer Latina", "De dónde soy", "Por amor", "Noches sin luna" and "Amor a la mexicana". The album became a pure commercial success, while the first single of the album ("Amor a la mexicana") became a number one hit in 14 countries. With Amor a la mexicana, Thalía was able to bring her music in markets like France, Belgium, Switzerland, Greece, and Hungary.

After the success of Amor a la mexicana, Thalía recorded the Spanish and Portuguese versions of the song "Journey to the Past", produced by Atlantic Records, as a part of the soundtrack of the Fox Animation Studios movie Anastasia (1997).

In the following year, she starred for the first time in a movie in English, named Mambo Café, written and directed by Reuben González. Mambo Café premiered in January 2000 in Mexico, Greece and Russia, distributed by Kushner Locke Entertainment.

In 1999, after Mambo Café, Thalía returned in television with telenovela Rosalinda. "Rosalinda" was considered to be Televisa's most expensive production ever by that time, as well as the most exported in foreign countries, as it was sold in over 180 countries. In an interview of that period Thalía had commented: "The telenovelas are the ones that opened the doors of the world for me, because the audience of telenovelas is much more passionate than the audience of cinema. What's more, television is free".

=== 2000–2005: Crossover and first tour in the United States ===
Emilio Estefan also produced Thalía's sixth studio album, Arrasando, released on 25 April 2000, which was successful. It spawned the singles "Entre el mar y una estrella", "Regresa a mí", "Arrasando" and "Reencarnación". Thalía was nominated in the Latin Grammy category as the "Best Female Pop Vocal Album". The album received one Latin Grammy nomination and it won in its category as the "Best Sound Engineered Album of the year". The singles of this album were huge hits. In 2001 she was nominated for her record Arrasando and won a Lo Nuestro award in the category of People's Prize, and was the first artist to whom an innovative award from Billboard Awards for Latin Music was given, the "Star Award".

On 4 May 2001, the President of the United States, George W. Bush, invited her to a party celebrating Cinco de Mayo organized at the White House, where she interpreted a medley of popular Mexican songs with a Mexican mariachi band.

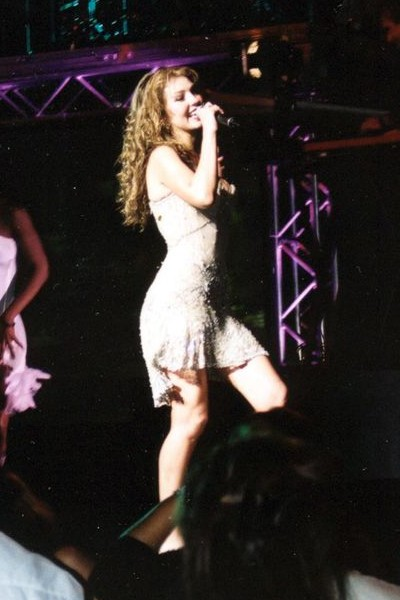
Thalía in the High Voltage Tour Los Angeles concert on 14 May 2004

On 28 August 2001, expressing her love for her country of birth, Mexico, she released her album Con Banda: Grandes Éxitos: a "greatest hits" album, but recorded with the typical Mexican "banda" sound. "Amor a la Mexicana" banda version was released as a single. The album was nominated for a Latin Grammy for "Best Banda Album" at the 3rd Annual Latin Grammy Awards in 2002.

Her seventh studio album, self-titled Thalía, was released on 21 May 2002. It was largely written and produced by Estéfano. Buoyed by a pair of chart-topping singles ("Tú y Yo" and "No me enseñaste") and a top-ten hit ("¿A quién le importa?") (cover of Alaska y Dinarama), this album hit number one for 6 consecutive weeks on the Top Latin Albums chart, reaching number eleven on the Billboard 200 chart and 2x Multi-Platinum status with sales in the U.S. of 200,000 copies. It was nominated in one Latin Grammy category – "Female Pop Vocal Album", and in four Latin Billboard categories – "Pop Track Female" and "Tropical Track Female" for "No Me Enseñaste", "Your World Award", and "Female Pop Album", for Thalía, winning the last two awards. "No Me Enseñaste" reached at No. 1 in Billboard's Hot Latin Tracks chart.

On 25 February 2003, she released her first remix album, Thalía's Hits Remixed. This album contains some remixes of her EMI era hits, such as "Amor a la Mexicana", "Piel Morena", "No Me Enseñaste" and "Tú y Yo." It also contains the English version of "Arrasando", called "It's My Party". Furthermore, it includes the previously unreleased medley that Thalía had recorded especially for her 2001 Latin Grammy Awards performance, but was later cancelled, due to the September 11 attacks.

On 8 July 2003, Thalía released her eighth studio album and the first one in English, the self-titled Thalía, featuring the rapper Fat Joe in "I Want You/Me Pones Sexy". "Baby, I'm in Love/Alguien Real", "Don't Look Back" and "Cerca De Ti" were singles too. The album landed at No. 11 in The Billboard 200. The song "I Want You" entered the American Top 40 with Casey Kasem and even reached the top 10 during that year. The song also entered the American Billboard Top 100 Singles Charts that year. She won an International Dance Music Award for her club-hit "Dance Dance (The Mexican)".

On 10 February 2004, Thalía released her first official Greatest Hits album, and "Cerca de ti" and "Acción y Reacción" were the singles from this album. In April and May, she toured USA and Mexico with her "High Voltage Tour".

Her ninth studio album, El Sexto Sentido, was released on 19 July 2005, and recorded mostly in Spanish, but with a few of the songs sung in English as well. It was reported to be the most expensive music album produced in Latin America in 2005. It had mild success, although the sound and the overall result make it one of her most integrated projects. "Amar sin ser amada" was the first single of the album and is considered as an infectious rock-edged tango-based song. "Un alma sentenciada", the second single of the album, is a feverish and, at points, hyperdramatic ballad. The explosive "Seducción" ("Seduction") and "Olvidame" were also released as singles, gaining considerable success. The album was also certified gold in Argentina, Greece and Mexico and double platinum in the United States.

=== 2006–2008: The Conexión Thalía Radio Show, Lyme disease and Lunada ===
In 2006, the album received a reloaded version, El Sexto Sentido: Re+Loaded. Thalía was the 'godmother' of Cantando Por Un Sueño, a Mexican TV reality show. It was rumored she got paid 1 million dollars to perform. Thalía recorded the title song of the show, and it was included in the album. It was released in Mexico on 13 February 2006 (U.S. 6 June, Spain 29 May) and features four new songs, including a duet with the group Aventura, "No, No, No" which become a massive hit. El Sexto Sentido was nominated for one Latin Grammy as "Best Female Pop Vocal Album", it was also nominated in one Latin Billboard category – "Pop Female Album" and in eight Premios Juventud categories.

In 2006, Thalía became a U.S. citizen at a swearing-in ceremony in New York, where she resides with her husband. Under Mexican law she is allowed to retain her Mexican citizenship. She also received an award by her then record company EMI, for sales of more than 10 million copies with all her discography with the company.

In March 2007, Thalía also joined ABC Radio to start The Conexión Thalía Radio Show, where she talks about music, fashion, news and political issues.

In May 2008, Thalía's single "Ten Paciencia", was premiered on the internet. Although, the single received a lukewarm response and did not perform well in the U.S. charts and Top 20 hits in Mexico, it was No. 1 in several countries of Latin America. Furthermore, her tenth studio album Lunada, was released on 24 June 2008, and debuted at number eight in Mexico and peaked at number ten on the Billboard Top Latin Albums (U.S). It was the last Thalía's studio album released by EMI.

Thalía later appeared on El Show De Cristina, aired in late July by Univision's Spanish network to promote the album. According to Univision network, her appearance on the show received huge ratings, reaching No. 1 in both the Chicago and Miami markets. The show was said to have been viewed by over 87 million people in the US alone.

"Será porque te amo", the second single, received no promotion and became another failed single. It is a Spanish language cover version of the Italian hit "Sarà perché ti amo", originally performed by the group Ricchi e Poveri.

On 23 October, it was announced that Thalía was suffering from Lyme disease, which is transmitted by ticks. Fortunately, it was discovered quickly, and the singer, as well as her mother, Yolanda Miranda, were able to receive antibiotics in time. On 18 November, Thalía announced the end of her collaboration with EMI Music.

Despite Lunada being a commercial disappointment, it was named as the "Best Album of the Year" by ¡Hola! readers. The latest work of the Mexican singer achieved 8,750 votes beating artists, such as Luis Miguel, Britney Spears, Mariah Carey, Beyoncé and Madonna.

=== 2009–2011: Success of Primera Fila and Growing Stronger ===
On 30 July 2009, Thalía recorded her acoustic album, Primera fila, her first album after she signed with Sony Music Entertainment. In October, Thalía performed at the White House, along with other Latin singers, in an event organized by President Barack Obama that celebrated Hispanic heritage.

In October of the same year, she released the first single from Primera fila, a song named "Equivocada". In December Thalía released her album, which contained duets with Joan Sebastian and Pedro Capó and various other songs, that became huge radio hits in the following months. The production received critical accept and very positive reviews, while Jason Birchmeier stated that Primera Fila was one of the best albums Thalía has released in her whole career, and definitely the one with the most surprises. As for Thalía, she considered Primera Fila as "the most personal album" in her career.

Regarding to the album's commercial performance, Primera fila received diamond and triple platinum sales certifications in Mexico by AMPROFON, while the album had sold over 500,000 copies in Mexico around this time. Primera fila was the best selling album in Mexico in 2010, where it topped the charts for 55 non-consecutive weeks, the most weeks ever in Mexico's recorded music chart history. In Greece and Spain, the album reached the positions No. 6 and No. 32, respectively, while it reached No. 4 in Billboard's top Latin Albums and No. 2 in Billboard's Latin Pop Albums charts. Initially, Primera Fila had reached No. 1 on both aforementioned charts, but sales of the standard edition and the Walmart edition were later divided, leading to a retraction and update to Billboard's official peak positions for Primera Fila. After these changes, Primera fila went from a peak position of No. 167 to a peak position of No. 198 on the Billboard 200 albums chart. Until the month of October 2012, Primera fila had sold over 1.5 million copies worldwide.

In September 2010, Thalía released a special anniversary edition of the album under the title Primera fila... Un año después, which included 8 songs from the original album, as well as 2 never-released before songs, 2 remixes and a DVD with a documentary of the recording process of the album. In October 2010, Michael Bublé invited her to record a song with him in his holiday album Christmas. Together they recorded the bilingual song "Mis Deseos/Feliz Navidad" and their collaboration received very positive reviews.

=== 2012–2013: Habitame Siempre and VIVA! Tour ===
Thalía had a collaboration with US music veteran Tony Bennett for his "Viva:Duets" album, which was released on 22 October 2012. Together they performed live the classic song "The way you look tonight" in Today's show and the Katie Couric's show.

During the past months, she had announced that she was recording her eleventh studio album, Habítame siempre. On 21 September 2012, Thalía gave a private concert in New York City at Hammerstein Ballroom as a preview of the upcoming album. The album's lead single, "Manías", was released on 8 October 2012. Habítame siempre was released on 19 November 2012, in the United States and Latin America under the label of Sony Music Latin, while in Europe it is set to be released in 2013 by BMG Music. The album contains collaborations with Robbie Williams, Michael Bublé, Prince Royce and Gilberto Santa Rosa, among others and immensely after its release, it received mostly positive reviews. Habitame Siempre was certified triple platinum plus gold in Mexico for sales of more than 210,000 copies, gold in the United States for shipments exceeding 50,000 copies and platinum in Venezuela for over 10,000 copies shipped. In the meantime the second single of the album, "Te Perdiste Mi Amor", was certified platinum in Mexico for digital sales of over 60,000 copies.

On 24 March 2013, Thalía launched her VIVA! Tour in support of Habítame Siempre. The VIVA! Tour marks Thalía's first tour in a decade and consists of a series of intimate concerts in the United States and Mexico. Thalía stated in an interview that she also plans to expand the tour to Latin America, Europe and Asia if it meets positive commercial reception.

In October 2013, Thalía released in the United States and Latin America her fourth book Chupie (The Binky That Returned Home), and on 12 November, Thalía released in Mexico her second live album VIVA! Tour. This album was recorded on 27 April 2013, during her concert in Mexico City. In United States and Latin America, the album was released on 1 December 2013. It was certified gold in Mexico on its second week on the market for sales exceeding 30,000 copies.

On 5 December 2013, she received her own star in the Hollywood Walk of Fame as a recognition of her success.

=== 2014–2015: Viva Kids and Amore Mio ===
On 25 March 2014, Thalía released her first children album Viva Kids Vol. 1 in Mexico. The album contains 11 songs and received one nomination to Latin Grammy Awards 2014. Vamos A Jugar was the first single of the album and was released on 18 March 2014. Viva Kids Vol. 1 was released in US, on 5 June 2014.

On 22 July 2014, Italian singer Laura Pausini confirmed that by September that same year she would release a special version of her greatest hits album to the Hispanophone market, in an edition containing new duet with Thalía in Sino a ti.

On 9 September 2014, Thalía released the lead single of Amore Mio, "Por Lo Que Reste De Vida". The song debuted No. 50 in the Billboard Hot Latin Songs chart. The video music was released on 14 October 2014.

Thalía released her 12th studio album on 17 November 2014. Amore Mio was Thalía's second album that debuted at No. 1 on the Billboard Top Latin Albums chart. The album debuted at No. 173 on the Billboard 200 with 3,000 copies sold in first week in the US. In Mexico, the album debuted at No. 1. In December 2014, to celebrate Thalía's 25th anniversary as a solo artist, her first three albums were released as a digital download from iTunes and Spotify.

In January 2015, Thalía released her first fashion collection in United States with Macy's.

=== 2016–2017: Latina, world tour, and directorial debut ===
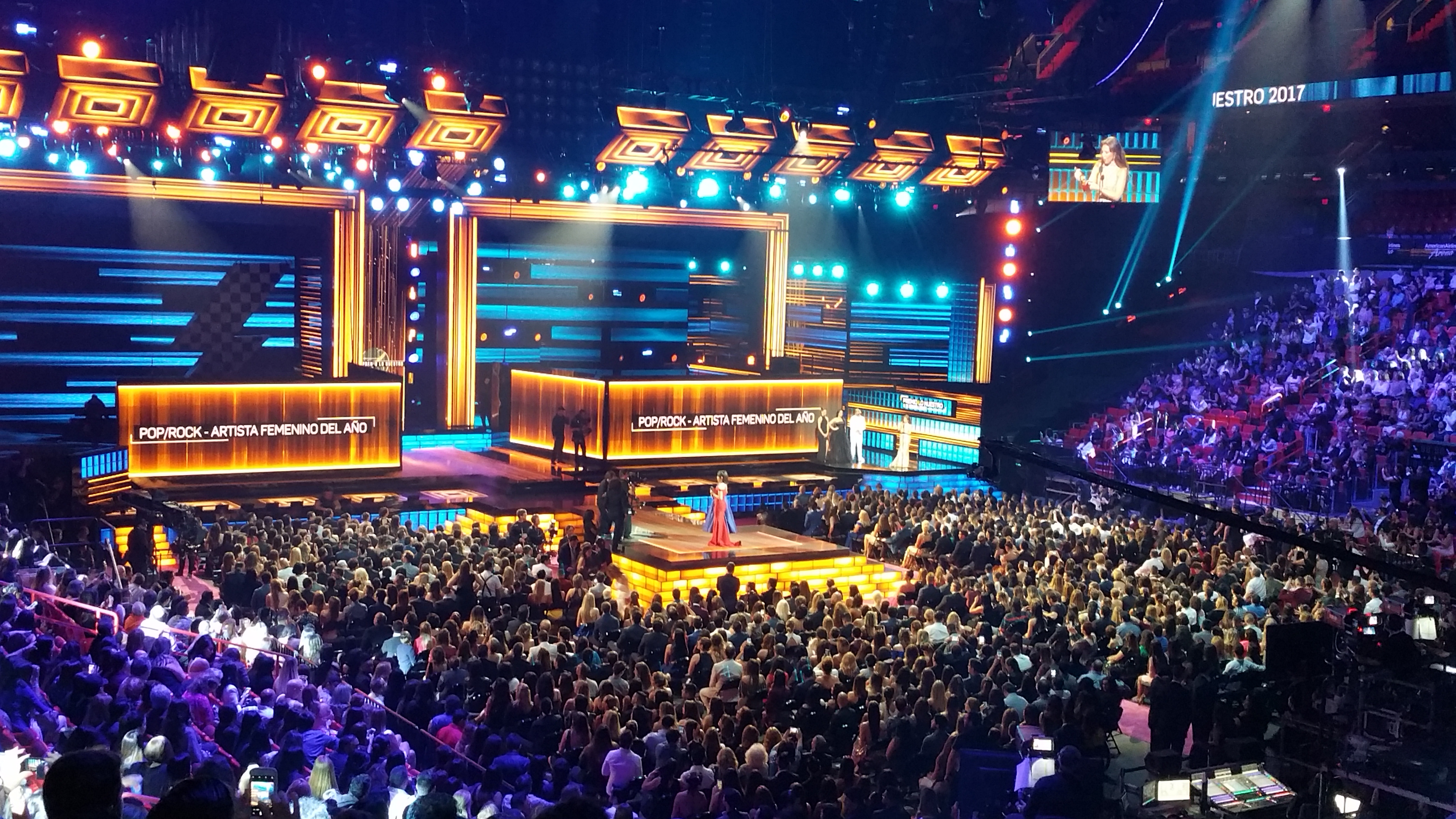
Far away view of Thalía during the stage of Premios Lo Nuestro 2017.

On 26 February 2016, she revealed through her social media accounts the album cover for her then-upcoming studio album, Latina, which was released on 21 April 2016. The album's first single, "Desde Esa Noche" featuring Maluma, peaked at number 16 on the Hot Latin Songs chart and number 4 on the Latin Pop Airplay chart. The second single of the album, Vuélveme a Querer was released on 29 April 2016. The third single of album was Todavía Te Quiero featuring De La Ghetto was released on 2 December 2016.

Thalía has announced she will embark on a new tour, her third overall, called Latina Love Tour.

In 2017 she made her directorial debut when she co-directed "15: A Quinceañera Story", a four-part series of documentary shorts that follows five latina quinceañeras. For this she received a nomination for Outstanding Directorial Achievement in Children's Programs at the 70th Directors Guild of America Awards That same year she collaborated with Colombian singer Carlos Vives in the song "Todo Me Gusta" from his album Vivesfsi. The song was not released as a single but still managed to peak at number 12 in Bolivia and also peaked at number 14 the U.S. Tropical Digital Songs Chart.

=== 2018–2019: Donna Summer Musical, Eyelure, Valiente, and Adria ===
In 2018 she produced Summer: The Donna Summer Musical on Broadway. The musical is based on the life of Donna Summer.

In August 2018 she released her false eyelash and eyebrow collection called Eyelure which is available at Walmart.

Thalía released her fourteenth studio album, Valiente, on 9 November 2018. The lead single "No Me Acuerdo" was certified quadruple platinum in both Mexico and the United States as well as double platinum in Spain. The album also spawned the hits "Me Oyen, Me Escuchan", "Lento", and "Lindo Pero Bruto" with the latter being certified gold in the United States. The album had a total of eight songs released as singles.

In January 2019 she released her line of hair care products called Adria by Thalía. The 7 piece collection in available in stores at Walmart and Target as well as online.

=== 2020–present: New collaborations, Viva Kids 2, and DesAMORfosis ===
In January 2020 Thalía released the single "Ya Tú Me Conoces" with Venezuelan brother duo Mau y Ricky. The song served as the lead single from her 17th studio album. A month after that she collaborated with Mexican duo Rio Roma on their song "Lo Siento Mucho", which entered the top 10 on the Mexican charts. A month later she collaborated again, this time with Brazilian drag queen Pabllo Vittar on the song "Tímida", which served as the fifth single from Vittar's album 111.

In June 2020 she collaborated with Peruvian singer Leslie Shaw on her single "Estoy Soltera", which also features Colombian singer Farina and served as the third single from Shaw's EP Yo Soy Leslie Shaw.

She released the second single of her upcoming studio album titled "La Luz" on 28 August 2020, on which she collaborated with Puerto Rican rapper Myke Towers. A month later she started on a Facebook watch series called Latin Music Queens alongside Sofía Reyes and Farina. The series would lead up to the release of two more singles with the first one being Ten Cuidao with Farina which premiered on episode three and the second single being Tick Tock which featured all three singers and premiered after the sixth and final episode. The latter also served as the third single from Thalía's upcoming album.

On 7 May 2021 she released "Mojito" which served as the fourth single from her album DesAMORfosis which she released on 14 May 2021.

== Acting career ==
Thalia was cast in a supporting role in the 1986 telenovela Pobre señorita Limantour with which she began her collaboration with Televisa, the largest mass media company in the Spanish-speaking world. In 1987, she went on to star in her first major role for Televisa in the 1987 teenage drama series Quinceañera, along with Mexican actress Adela Noriega. Quinceañera won the TV y Novelas award for Best Telenovela of the Year 1988. In 1989, she got her first lead role in Luz y Sombra, which was less successful.

In 1992, Thalía shot to fame starring in María Mercedes, for which she won a TV Y Novelas Award for Best Young Actress in 1993. This series was her first of three telenovelas later called Las Tres Marias ("The Three Marías") for sharing the character name. Marimar began in 1994 and Maria la del Barrio in 1995. The third was the most commercially successful of her career. Marimar is considered by some critics among the best telenovela of all time. In 1999, Thalía starred in her last telenovela, "Rosalinda". All four telenovelas were basically based on the same rags to riches character. With these telenovelas, Thalía became famous worldwide because of the extremely high ratings they achieved in more than 180 countries (especially the Philippines).

Although Thalía's presence in television is legendary, her presence in cinema is less important. She appeared for the first time in a movie when she was still a child in the 1979 film La Guerra De los Pasteles ("The War of the Cakes"). Furthermore, in 1999, she starred in Mambo Café, a modest indie film production that had a poor reception from critics.

== Business endeavours ==
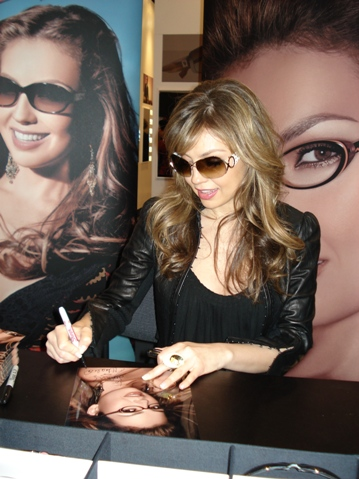
Thalía in a Visión Expo event in 2007, presenting her eyewear collections

Her first business endeavour started with a women's underwear line in 1993, and 1995. It become a success in her native country according to Diez Minutos. In 2002, Thalía signed a deal with Kmart to release her own clothing collection for women, as well as accessories and home products. In the middle of 2003, the "Thalía Sodi" collection was officially available in the US market in over 2,000 stores. Thalía commented: "My collection is a dream come true. I'm so happy to have created a clothing line inspired by my culture, trying to show the colors and the passion of our culture, that captures also a big part of my personal style". Thalía became the first Mexican woman to launch a clothing brand in the US.

Simultaneously, Thalía debuted her eyewear collection under the brand name "Thalía Eyewear Collection" in association with Kenmark Optical. In 2005, the line also became available in Mexico's market as Thalía signed a deal with "Devlyn" company. Up to 2007, Thalía had generated US$100 million from the sales of "Thalía Eyewear", with more than 1 million products sold. Precisely in 2007 Thalía presented a new eyewear collection in New York, and the brand was exported to over eighty countries around the world.

In April 2004, she entered the editorial market by releasing her own magazine Thalía in US, produced by American Media and oriented to the female Latin youth. The magazine included consultation and reports about issues like health, fashion and beauty. Some months later, in September, Thalía became the face of jewels' company Jacob & Co.

In 2004, she signed a contract with Hershey's with which she released her own chocolate and candy brand. In 2005, she designed a summer clothing line, and in the following year, she was converted into the face of "Carol's Daughter" company, specialized in beauty products, while in 2007 she launched her perfume, produced by "Fuller Cosmetics" company. In 2007, she joined ABC Radio and started her own radio show known as The Conexión Thalía Radio Show, in which she discusses music, fashion, news and political issues, and invites various people to talk with her on different issues. The program, that is weekly and lasts two hours, premiered on 17 March 2007, and still goes on, while it has expanded to over 70 radio stations through the US.

In September 2007, she released the beauty advice book Thalía: ¡Belleza!-Lessons in Lipgloss and Happiness and in June 2009, she released her second book entitled Thalia: ¡Radiante!-Your Guide to a Fit and a Fabulous Pregnancy. In May 2010, she revealed new accessories and jewels available via her website, apart from a new clothing line in association with multinational company C&A. In February 2011, she became the new face of Head & Shoulders and in November, she released her third book, which is her autobiography and named Growing Stronger. Thalía has also been the public face of various advertisements, like Dr Pepper in 2001 or Victoria's Secret in 2005. In April 2012, she inaugurated her own yoga center in New York.

In 2015, she signed a contract with "ePura", a Mexican water company and she also signed an exclusive deal with Macy's to launch her apparel, shoes and jewelry collections. Jeffrey Gennette, Macy's president stated that "the Thalia Sodi collection is the biggest private-brand launch in the history of the company by a long shot."

== Philanthropy and activism ==
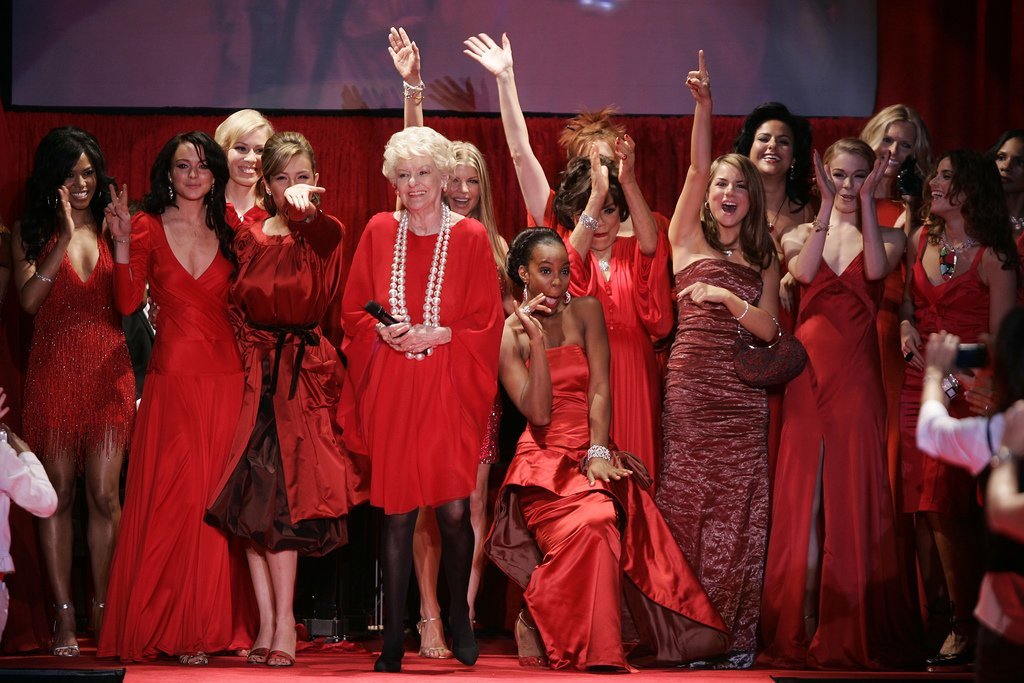
Thalía (third from left in the front) with other celebrities at The Heart Truth's Red Dress Collection in 2006

Thalía has participated in various humanitarian campaigns. Since 2004, she has been an official celebrity ambassador and volunteer of March of Dimes, to support national fundraising and awareness campaigns. March of Dimes is a United States nonprofit organization that works to improve the health of mothers and babies. Also, since 2016 she is a UNICEF Mexico Ambassador. Thalía also became a member of "ALAS Foundation", which is a non-profit organization that strives to launch a new social movement that will generate a collective commitment to comprehensive Early Childhood Development programs for the children in Latin America.

In May 2009, Thalía and Tommy Mottola were recognized from St. Jude Children's Research Hospital in Miami for their support in children in need. In 2010, she reunited with other recording artists, performers and actors like Sharon Stone, Michael Douglas, Jennifer Lopez and Marc Anthony between others, to raise funds for the "Foundation of the New York's police department", which works for better urban security. In 2011, she attended a beneficial event in New York, organized by the Robin Hood Foundation with the aim to raise money for homeless youth. In the same year, she closed the Mexican Teleton by offering a live concert.

In November 2012, Thalía took humanitarian aid and comfort to compatriots of her in New York that were affected by Hurricane Sandy. In April 2013, Thalía was awarded with the "Your Voice Inspires Many" award by the Lyme Research Alliance.

== Personal life ==
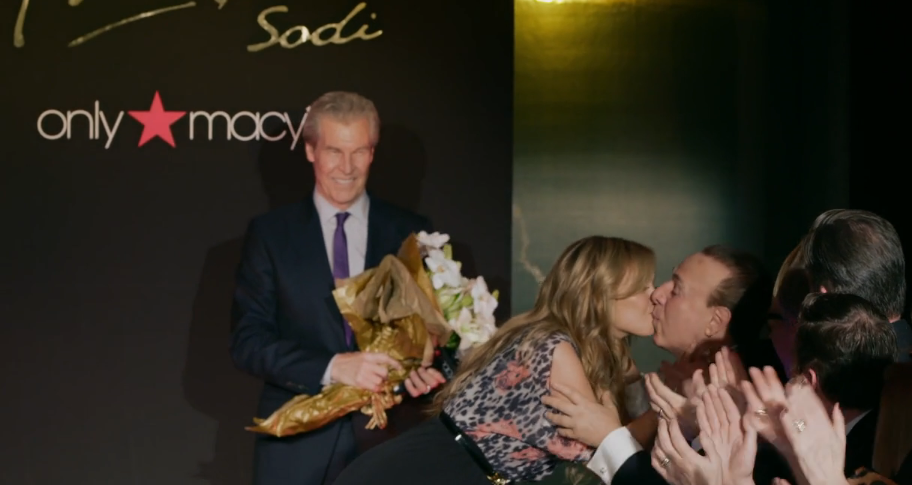
Thalía kissing her husband, Tommy Mottola at her Macy's Thalía Collection

In 1989, at age 18, Thalía began a relationship with record producer Alfredo Díaz Ordaz (son of former Mexican president Gustavo Díaz Ordaz); Díaz Ordaz, then in his early 40s, produced her first solo albums, and the couple later became engaged, remaining together until his death from hepatitis C in December 1993.

She was in a relationship with actor Fernando Colunga from 1995 to 1996 while they appeared on the series María la del Barrio. Thalía married music executive Tommy Mottola on 2 December 2000. The couple have two children, a daughter born in October 2007, and a son born in June 2011. Thalía has stated in her autobiography and elsewhere that she is religious and believes profoundly in God. She began studying Kabbalah in 2002, using many of its symbols in the artwork of her album El Sexto Sentido. In 2015 she accidentally revealed during an interview that she had multiple miscarriages which caused her depression and were some of the hardest times in her life. In 2008, Thalía was estimated as one of the wealthiest Mexican female artists, with a net worth of over US$100 million according to Mira! magazine.

In September 2002, Thalía's sisters, Laura Zapata and Ernestina Sodi, were kidnapped in Mexico City. Zapata was released 18 days after her kidnapping, and her sister Ernestina was released on the 36th day. Thalía has had a series of familial conflicts, especially with her sister Laura Zapata. She has opted to keep her point of view regarding her familial issues private, despite the attacks she has received from her older sister. In a press interview, Thalía stated that her familial problems with her sister are "just a dark cloud in a shiny sky".

== Influences ==
According to Thalia herself, her major personal influence was her mother, who was a motivating manager for Thalia from the very beginning of her career until 2000. As for her artistic influences, Thalia's work is mostly influenced by Celine Dion, Donna Summer, Gloria Estefan, Sade, Billie Holiday, Frank Sinatra, The Doors, and Kylie Minogue, while she has stated that she always admired Marilyn Monroe and Madonna. Thalia's first idol, according to her, was athlete Nadia Comăneci. She has even stated that her record-breaking performance was a huge motivation for her to follow a career in entertainment.

== Legacy ==
=== Music career ===
International media outlets like Time magazine have named her as the "Queen of Latin Pop". Billboard called Thalía as "Latin American's Reigning Music Queen" in late 1990s, and one of their Greatest Latin Artists of All Time in 2020. The magazine also stated she has achieved critical acclaim and commercial success as both a singer and songwriter, and has remained as one of the leading female artists in Latin music. Before her crossover attempt to the English market with a homonymous album in 2003, she gained success with her Spanish recordings outside of Hispanic countries. She stated: "My internationalization has come for several years ago and in Spanish, which is very significant".

Thalia has been an influential artist for a number of Latin pop singers, including Anahí, Belinda, and artists from urban scene such as Becky G, Natti Natasha and Karol G among others. (Note: Attributed to multiple references:) In addition, various artists have expressed their admiration towards Thalía, such as Julio Iglesias, Tony Bennett, Inna, Robbie Williams, Lindsay Lohan, and Laura Pausini whom described her as "the first famous Mexican woman" she heard about. Others like Tiziano Ferro, Raúl Cuenca and Espinoza Paz have expressed their desire to work with Thalía.

=== Cultural impact ===
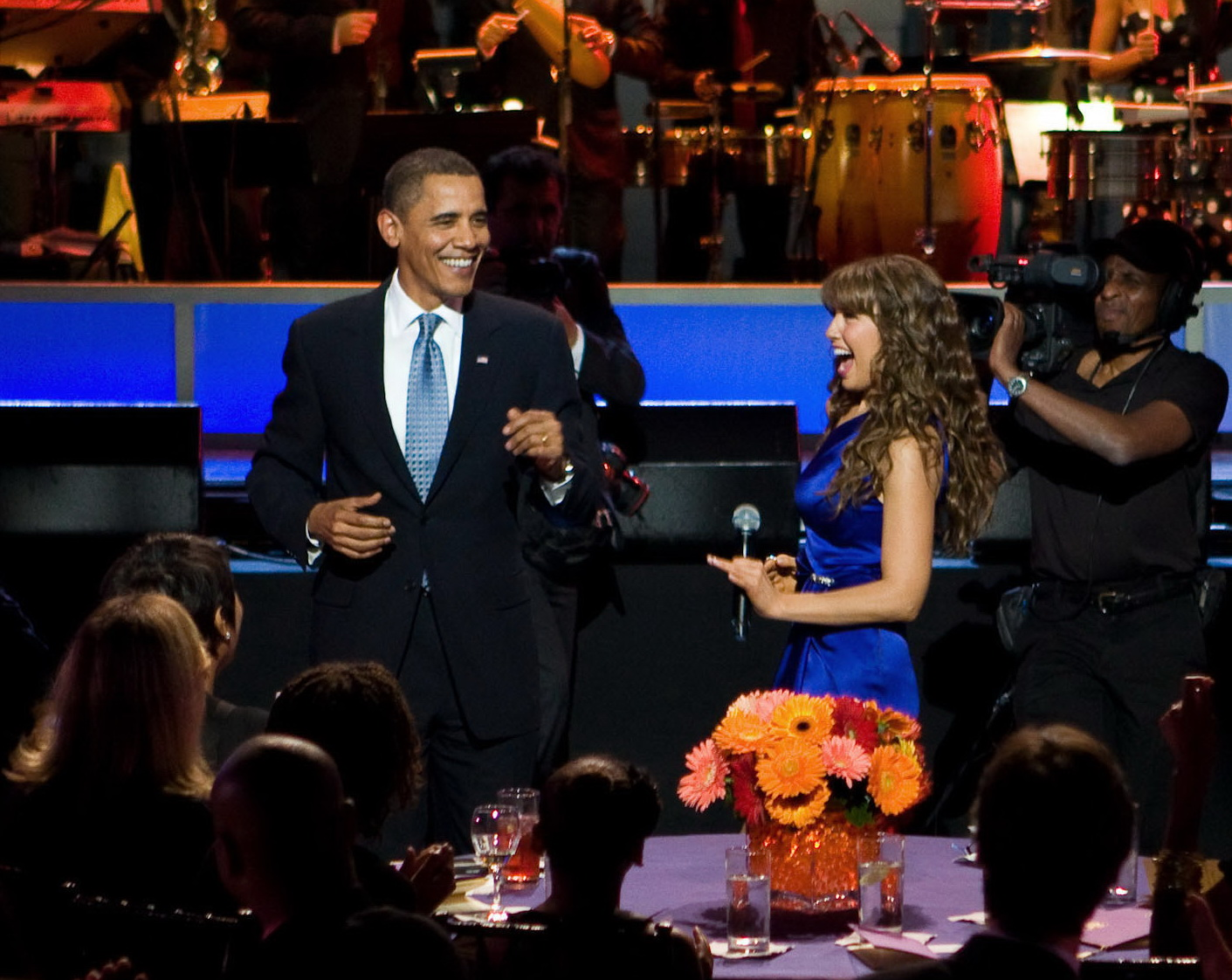
Thalía with then U.S. President Barack Obama singing "Amor a la Mexicana" at the White House. According to Billboard, Thalía helped to globalize and popularize Mexican culture with the album of the same name.

Thalía has been also described as an influential Hispanic woman, and according to Billboard's Leila Cobo she "has carved out one of the most successful global Latin careers in memory". In 1997, 25 April was declared by the government of Los Angeles, as "Thalia's National Day". She was included among People en Español's "Most Influential Latin Women" in 2018, and in their book Legends: the 100 most iconic Hispanic entertainers of all time (2008). Thalía holds the record for the most appearances in their list of "Most Beautiful" ("Los Más Bellos").

According to American magazine Ocean Drive in 2001, Thalía is "the biggest star Mexico has exported in the last decades". She has been similarly called as the biggest name and popular singer since the 1990s in Mexican pop music by other authors. In 2011, Thalía was ranked at number eight in Univision's list of "25 most influential Mexican musicians". She was named one of the best-known Mexican women figures along with Silvia Pinal and Dolores Ayala in a poll conducted in 2007, and the best female entertainer in a poll conducted in 2000 for Mexican newspaper Reforma. Producer Emilio Estefan called her "Mexico's diva of divas" and stated "Thalía is one of the few female artists in the Latino market who has legions of fans throughout Latin America, including Brazil".

Thalía is also considered a gay icon and according to Infobae, many of her fans recognized her as the "Latin queen of gay community". The same publication also stated she is one of the most "emulated pop singers by transvestite shows in gay nightclubs". Andrés del Real from La Tercera felt she is an icon for the sexual minority, and professor Ramón García in Chicano Representation and the Strategies of Modernism (1997) wrote Thalía is "the dream identity of many drag queens". Ed Grant from Time magazine also commented that many of them called themselves "Thalíos". In addition, she was also recognized as a successful businesswoman. According to Felipe Escudero from El Mundo in 2006, Thalía was described as the "Latin Madonna of the Hispanic market" and a "Queen Midas" due her success as a businesswoman.

==== Telenovelas ====
Thalia's rise to international prominence coincided with the worldwide broadcast of the soap operas she starred in. Media referred to her as the "Queen of Telenovelas" ("Queen of Soap Operas") and Billboard named her "the most widely recognized Spanish-speaking soap star in the world".

Named as the "Thalía phenomenon" by The New York Times, media outlets noted how she was received with enthusiastic crowds in countries like Indonesia or Philippines, comparing her visits to a head of state due to the treatment she received, including by Filipino president Fidel V. Ramos. High ratings were reported in various countries (some of her soap operas ended among the most watched television broadcasts), while her soap operas were aired in more than 180 countries reaching an estimated audience of 2 billion viewers, according to UNICEF. According to SunStar, some have considered her shows as the beginning of Filipinos' fondness of telenovelas.

== Awards and achievements ==
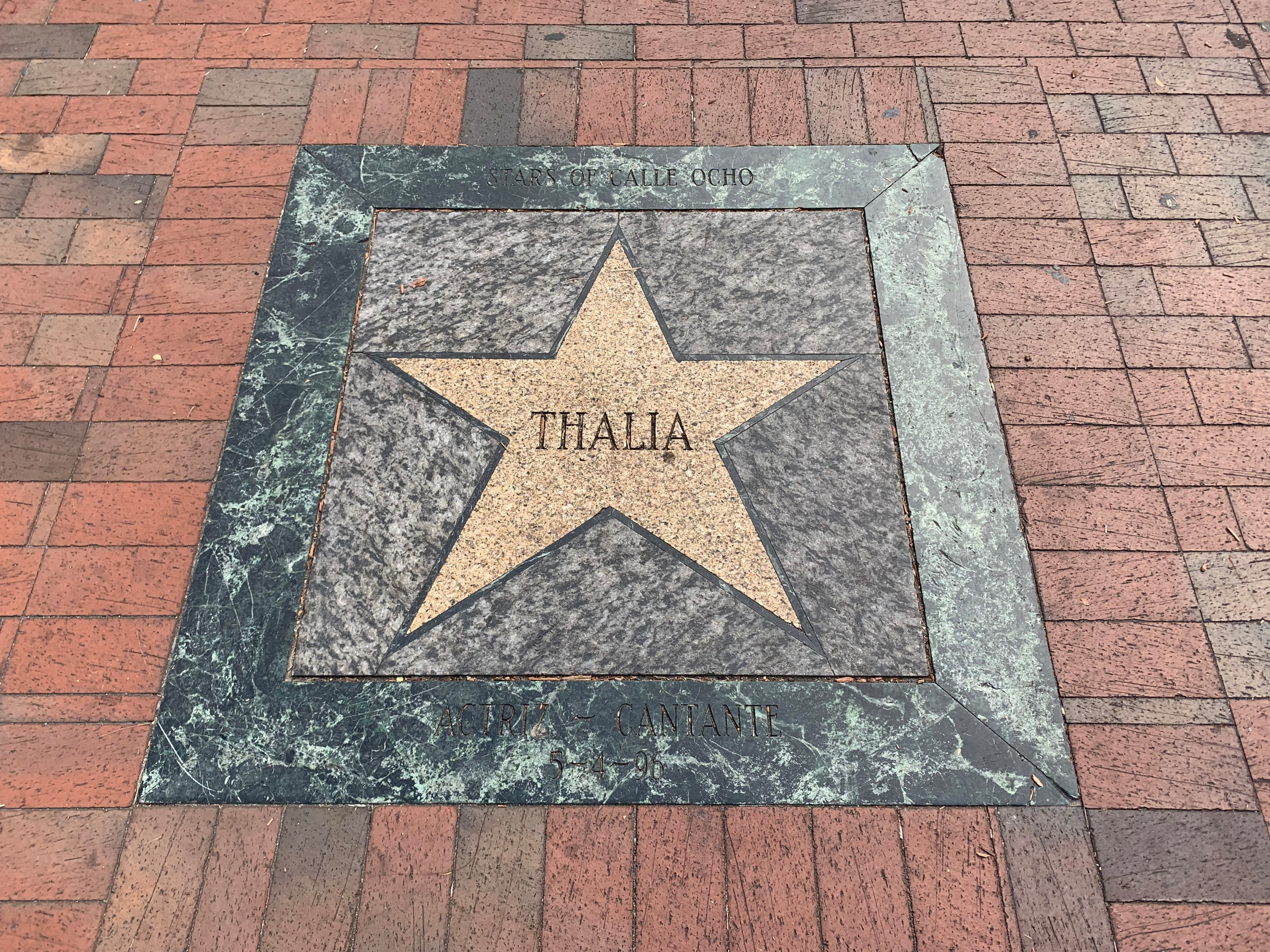
Thalía's Walk of Fame Star at Calle 8, Miami

Thalía has achieved multiple milestones during her career in music, acting and her business ventures. Luis Magaña from El Universal commented that those record figures in her career are "impressive" and found that she has been "the first" in place of different situations in life. As of 2021, she is both the most followed Mexican female artist in Spotify, and with most views on YouTube. She was also the most followed Mexican singer in Instagram before being overtaken by Danna Paola in 2020.

Thalía became the first Latin performer to release an album recorded primarily in Tagalog with Nandito Ako in 1997. In addition, Thalía con banda (2001) became the first stylized banda record to obtain a certification in Spain, while En éxtasis (1995) made her the first Mexican female singer to obtain a certification in Brazil.

Shortly after the broadcast of her 1990's telenovelas, Thalía became the highest-paid actress in Televisa history. She became the first actress to make a trilogy of telenovelas. As a businesswoman, Thalía became the first Mexican woman with a line of clothing in the U.S., as well as the first to clossing bells at Nasdaq. Thalía is the first Latina to have contracts or to be the face campaign of established brands such as Jacob & Co and The Hershey Company. She was the only Latina to appear in Rebonds (1998) by French fashion company Louis Vuitton.

Thalía has sold over 20 million records worldwide, making her one of the best-selling Latin music artists. Her albums En éxtasis, Amor a la Mexicana and Arrasando attained sales of over 2 million copies worldwide each, becoming one of the best-selling Spanish-language albums, in addition to have some of the best-selling albums in Mexico, and the Philippines. Her single "No Me Acuerdo" is one of the highest-certified Latin singles in the United States. As of 1997, Thalía remains the best-selling Mexican female solo artist in Brazil. Thalía is the first recipient of the Star Award at the Billboard Latin Music Awards. In 2013, she was recognized with a Hollywood Walk of Fame, becoming the first Mexican-born female singer to receive the award.

== Discography ==
Studio albums

- Thalía (1990)
- Mundo de Cristal (1991)
- Love (1992)
- En éxtasis (1995)
- Nandito Ako (1997)
- Amor a la Mexicana (1997)
- Arrasando (2000)
- Thalía (2002)
- Thalía (2003)
- El Sexto Sentido (2005)
- Lunada (2008)
- Habítame Siempre (2012)
- Viva Kids Vol. 1 (2014)
- Amore Mío (2014)
- Latina (2016)
- Valiente (2018)
- Viva Kids Vol. 2 (2020)
- Desamorfosis (2021)
- Thalía's Mixtape (2023)
- A Mucha Honra (2024)
- Navidad Melancólica (2024)
- Todo Suena Mejor en Cumbia (2026)

== Concert tours ==
- En Éxtasis Tour (1997)
- High Voltage Tour (2004)
- Viva! Tour (2013)
- Latina Love Tour (2016)

== Written works ==
1. Thalía : ¡Belleza! Lessons in Lipgloss and Happiness. Chronicle Books. 2007. ISBN 978-0811858298.
2. Thalía: ¡Radiante! Your Guide to a Fit and Fabulous Pregnancy. Chronicle Books. 2009. ISBN 978-0811858120.
3. Growing Stronger. Penguin Books. 1 November 2011. ISBN 978-0451234414.
4. Chupie: The Binky That Returned Home. Penguin Books. 2013. ISBN 978-0451416056.

== See also ==
- Sodi family
- List of most watched television broadcasts
- List of most expensive celebrity photographs
- List of UNICEF Goodwill Ambassadors
- List of best-selling Latin music artists
- Women in Latin music
- List of songs recorded by Thalía
