= Thalía (2013 album) =

Compilation album by Thalía
- Released: 9 December 2013
- Recorded: 2013
- Language: Portuguese; Spanish
- Label: Sony Music
- Producer: Tommy Mottola

Thalía chronology
Viva Tour (2013)	Thalía (2013)	Viva Kids Vol. 1 (2014)

Singles from Thalía
- 1. "Estou Apaixonado" Released: March 14, 2014

Thalía is a compilation album by Mexican singer Thalía, and fourth eponymous album released on 9 December 2013, by Sony Music. The album was released exclusively in Brazil.

The album is a collection that contains her greatest hits since joining Sony Music, as well as four songs sung by Thalía exclusively in Portuguese.

The album's lead single "Estou Apaixonado" had radio airplay success entering the charts in Brazil and featured Brazilian singer Daniel.

== Background and production ==
The album brings together songs from the albums Primera Fila and Habítame Siempre and Portuguese versions of four songs from these two albums: "Manías", "Equivocada", "Beijame" and "Estou Apaixonado", which she performs in a duet with Brazilian country music singer Daniel.

This was the first time since 1997 that Thalía recorded music in Portuguese, this time with hopes to extend her Viva Tour to Brazil, a country that she hadn't visited since 2000.

According to the singer, the duet with singer Michael Bublé on the song "Bésame Mucho" was immersed in the rhythm of bossa nova, one of the singer's favorite Brazilian musical styles. The singer showed the album cover on her Instagram page on the night of November 21, 2013.

To promote the album, a music video was made for the song "Estou Apaixonado" (translation: I'm in Love") with Daniel, the singers recorded the video separately in the studio and then the images were merged, it was released in 14 March 2014.

== Track listing ==
No.	Title	Writer(s)	Length
1.	"Manias (Portuguese Version)"	Raúl Ornelas; Portuguese Version: Juliana Leite Arantes	3:48
2.	"Beijame (Bésame)"	Jorge Luis Chacín, Ricardo Montaner; Portuguese Version: Roberta Miranda	4:36
3.	"Bésame Mucho (feat. Michael Bublé)"	Consuelo Velazquez	3:39
4.	"Estou Apaixonado (feat. Daniel)"	Donato Poveda, Fabio Alfonso Salgado	4:47
5.	"Equivocada (Portuguese Version)"	Mario Domm, Maria Bernal; Portuguese Version: Cesar Lemos	4:04
6.	"Qué Será de Ti (Como Vai Você)"	Antonio Marcos, Mario Marcos	4:37
7.	"Enséñame a Vivir"	Reyli Barba	4:22
8.	"Mujeres"	Ricardo Arjona	3:30
9.	"Atmósfera"	Guiliano Matheus, Silvio Donizeti	3:43
10.	"Habítame Siempre"	Mario Domm, Maria Bernal	4:01
11.	"Regalito de Dios"	Edgar Alfredo Zabaleta	3:12
12.	"Ojalá"	Andres Castro, Edgar Barrera, Omar Alfanno	4:41
13.	"Hits Medley (No Me Enseñaste/Tú Y Yo/Entre El Mar Y Una Estrella/María La Del Barrio)"		5:52

== Release history ==
Country	Date	Format(s)
Brazil	December 24, 2013	Compact disc
Worldwide	December 26, 2013	Digital download
