= Viva! Tour =

2013 concert tour by Thalia

- Tour by Thalía
- Promotional tour poster
- Associated album: Primera fila Habítame Siempre
- Start date: March 24, 2013
- End date: April 27, 2013
- Legs: 1
- No. of shows: 7 in North America
- Box office: $1,108,290

Thalía concert chronology
- High Voltage Tour (2004); The VIVA! Tour (2013); Latina Love Tour (2016)

The Viva! Tour was the fifth concert tour by Mexican recording artist Thalía in support of her first live album Primera fila and her eleventh studio album Habítame Siempre, both of which have had a huge commercial impact in all over Latin America and the United States. It was also Thalía's first tour in nine years, following the 2004 High Voltage Tour, and it was considered one of the most anticipated Latin tours in 2013. The tour started in Chicago on March 24, 2013 and was planned to include concerts in all over Latin America and potentially Europe, but this was later scrapped. The tour consisted of intimate concerts in musical venues and concert halls with limited capacity, as this is the artistic concept of Thalía's most recent album releases.

== Background ==
Ever since the release of her first live album Primera fila (2009), Thalía had expressed her desire to offer live concerts in small venues, as it was the concept of the album. Even though she tried to organize a tour, she got pregnant and as a result, she had to postpone it. After giving birth to her second child in 2011 and recording her eleventh studio album Habítame Siempre, she claimed that she was planning a tour in order to promote both Primera fila and Habítame Siempre. During her promotional visit in Mexico, some weeks after the official release of Habítame Siempre, Thalía confirmed that in 2013 she would go on tour. Furthermore, she went on to state that with her tour she would visit many countries in Latin America, apart from the United States and Mexico. She also stated that she planned to have some concerts in other European or Asian countries, in which she has a solid fan base. In almost all the interviews, Thalía expressed that she would choose to perform only in small places like theaters or bohemian bars, in order to maintain the two latest albums' concept and feel closer to her audience.

According to a press release, Thalía stated that in the set list of the concerts, she will include some of the most significant hits of her long-lasting solo career as well as songs from her two last album releases, Primera fila and Habítame Siempre. Regarding to the tour she said : "I am very excited about this tour. My concert at the Hammerstein Ballroom in NY was only a teaser of what is to come and I now want to present the tour to my fans who have anxiously waited for it". The tour passed from United States to Mexico.

== Concert synopsis ==
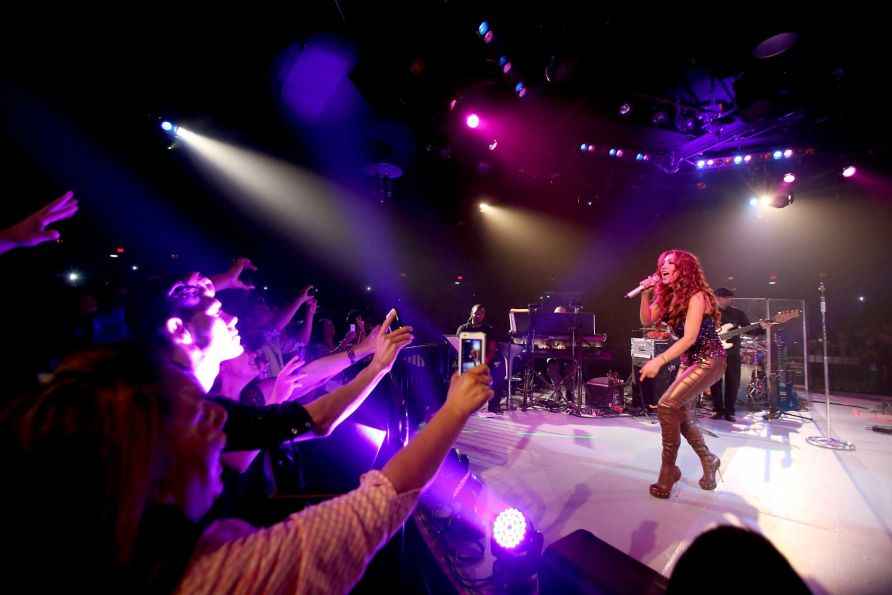
Thalía performing in Houston on March 31, 2013.

The VIVA! Tour was initially planned as a tour of intimate concerts in venues with limited seating capacity so that Thalía could support the concept of her latest two albums releases, Primera fila and Habítame Siempre. As a result, the major part of the tour set list includes the interpretation of romantic songs, mostly from her latest two albums. However, as Thalía had stated she wouldn't want to disappoint part of her audience that would desire to listen to some of her classic dance hits of her past records. Regarding to the choice of the songs included in the tour's set list, Thalía stated : "I am constituted by pure romanticism, but also I have my more wild, more sexy and more overwhelming persona. I will always be the hembra sanduguera (charming female)." (Note: The phrase hembra sandunguera refers to a lyric of Thalía's 1997 hit single Mujer Latina. As it is a Cuban idiom, it cannot be translated to English with the exact meaning the phrase has. Generally though, it means an alluring and fascinating woman, who is passionate and enthusiastic with life.)

As a result, there is a duality in the concept of the concerts, which consists of the more romantic part, in which Thalía interprets stately romantic Latin pop ballads, both newer and classic ones, and the dance part of the concerts, which is more like a celebration and a tribute to her classic dance hits of previous records. The second part is closer to the title of the tour, "VIVA!", which in Spanish is an exclamation used to express the will for something to live forever and has a celebratory mood. In the shows, Thalía preferred to combine the quality presented in her Primera fila release with the nostalgic effect of some of her most representative hits from the 1980s till today. Apart from new repertoire, she sings a capella classic songs from her first records as a solo artist, while she also makes a tribute to the theme songs from her popular telenovelas. In a general retrospect of the set list, Thalía intended to give a balanced presentation of various phases she has had in her 30-year-plus career apart from promoting the latest album releases, satisfying big part of her audience. She ends the concerts with "Manías", the lead single from Habítame Siempre.

Since March 28, there were changes in the set list of the concerts in North America, since they have changed the order of some songs and were added and deleted some others. There were also changes in the Thalía's outfits.

The concerts at the National Auditorium had a more elaborate stage design, with 6 video screens on the sides and one central screen. She also had artists like Yuri, Maria José, Erick Rubin, Samo from Camila, Jesús Navarro from Reik and Leonel García to join her on stage.

== Reception ==
=== Critical ===
Joey Guerra from the Houston Chronicle wrote a favorable review for the tour, stating that Thalía has the ability to "dazzle the audience and master the stage", although he mentioned as a negative point the fact that "her voice sometimes becomes overpowered by the band or the crowd", referring specifically to Thalía's concert in Houston. He also applauded her for being "enthusiastic, coquettish and flirty onstage, with both the audience and the crew, while she seemed totally at home during the frenetic club energy of 'Seducción', 'A quien le importa' and 'Arrasando'". He concluded his review with the phrase "It was pop dazzle with just enough sabor".

=== Commercial ===
Thalía in an effort to preserve the essence of intimacy and transparency she introduced in her first live album, Primera Fila, and in gratitude to her fans, opted to perform in venues with a more acoustic-intimate feel. The first concert that launched the tour took place at the Vic Theatre in Chicago. Tickets were sold out a few days before opening night.

In Mexico, Thalía's concert at the National Auditorium set for April 26, 2013 became sold out a few hours after the presale of tickets through Ticketmaster. For this reason, she added the following day (April 27, 2013) as a second date in the same venue due to high demand. National Auditorium's seating capacity is approximately 10,000.

Thalía's concerts in Los Angeles and New York City are promoted by Live Nation Entertainment, and the concert in Chicago is promoted by Jam Productions. Her concert in the Wiltern Theatre, Los Angeles set to take place on March 28, also met high demand, selling out in less than five days. For this reason, Thalía announced that she would perform in the same venue two days earlier, on March 26, 2013.

== Broadcast and recordings ==
According to the Mexican newspaper Reforma, the April 26 and 27 shows in Mexico, at the National Auditorium, will be filmed for the upcoming tour DVD/ Blu-ray/ CD release. It was officially confirmed that the Thalía Viva Tour Live CD+DVD/ Blu-ray will be released in Mexico on November 12, and worldwide on December 1, 2013.

On September 14, 2014, HBO Latino will be broadcasting the full National Auditorium show, with Video On Demand starting on September 6.

== Set list ==
1. "Intro"
2. "Atmósfera"
3. "Qué Será De Ti"
4. "Tómame O Déjame"
5. "Habítame Siempre"
6. "Cómo"
7. "Enséñame A Vivir"
8. "Con Los Años Que Me Quedan" (performed with Samo, Jesus Navarro, and Leonel Garcia)
9. "Hoy Ten Miedo De Mi
10. "Manías"
11. 90's Medley
  1. "Fuego Cruzado"
  2. "Sangre"
  3. "Pienso En Ti"
  4. "En La Intimidad
12. "No Soy El Aire"
13. "Mujeres" (Interlude) / "Mujeres"
14. "Equivocada"
15. Telenovelas Medley
  1. "Quinceañera"
  2. "Rosalinda"
  3. "Marimar"
  4. "María la del Barrio"
16. "La Apuesta" (performed with Erik Rubín)
17. NY Medley
  1. "No Me Enseñaste" (Remix)
  2. "Tú y Yo (Remix)"
  3. "Entre El Mar Y Una Estrella" (Pablo Flores Club Mix)
  4. "Piel Morena (Remix)"
18. "Amor A La Mexicana"
19. Medley Hits
  1. "Seducción"
  2. "¿A Quién Le Importa?"
  3. "Arrasando"
Additional Setlist Information
- During various of her concerts, Thalía clutched flags of Mexico and other countries, while she waved the LGBT flag many times, mostly when she sang the popular gay anthem "A Quien le Importa". She also had fans to dance or sing with her while performing on stage.
- In the concert in Chicago, during the performance of the song "Te Perdiste Mi Amor", Thalía made a sarcastic comment toward those who criticize her ability to dance "bachata", while she asked a fan to dance with her.
- In the Los Angeles concert, she met her compatriot singer Cristian Castro, while she also performed a duet with norteña singer Gerardo Ortiz.
- Thalía added a remixed version of Piel Morena on the third medley of the set list in March 28.
- During the Houston concert, Thalía performed Amor Prohibido, as a tribute to the deceased singer Selena, while she ended the concert with Arrasando, instead of Manías, which she performed in the middle of the concert.
- In the New York concert, she sang Estoy Enamorado with singer Pedro Capó, and Con Los Años Que Me Quedan with Spanish singer Victor Manuel.
- In the two concerts in Mexico, she was accompanied by various artists like Yuri, Leonel García, Jesús Navarro, Samo, María José and Erik Rubin and performed various songs with them. In the same concerts, she also showed a video with powerful women that marked history, like Maria Callas, Hillary Clinton and Mother Teresa, while performing the song "Fuego Cruzado", apart from an inspiring video introduction about women's rights.

== Tour dates ==
Date	City	Country	Venue
North America
March 24, 2013	Chicago	United States	The Vic Theatre
March 26, 2013	Los Angeles	United States	Wiltern Theatre
March 28, 2013	Los Angeles	United States	Wiltern Theatre
March 30, 2013	Houston	United States	Arena Place
April 3, 2013	New York City	United States	Nokia Theater
April 26, 2013	Mexico City	Mexico	National Auditorium
April 27, 2013	Mexico City	Mexico	National Auditorium

=== Box office score data ===
Venue	City	Attendance / available tickets	Gross revenue
The Vic Theatre	Chicago	948 / 948 (100%)	$37,920
National Auditorium (Note: Includes data for two shows in the National Auditorium, April 26 and 27.)	Mexico City	19,305 / 19,305 (100%)	$1,070,370
TOTAL		20,253 / 20,253 (100%)	$1,108,290

- Information about the box office score data of the other dates has not been revealed by Billboard magazine yet.
