= List of awards and nominations received by Espinoza Paz =

Espinoza Paz awards and nominations
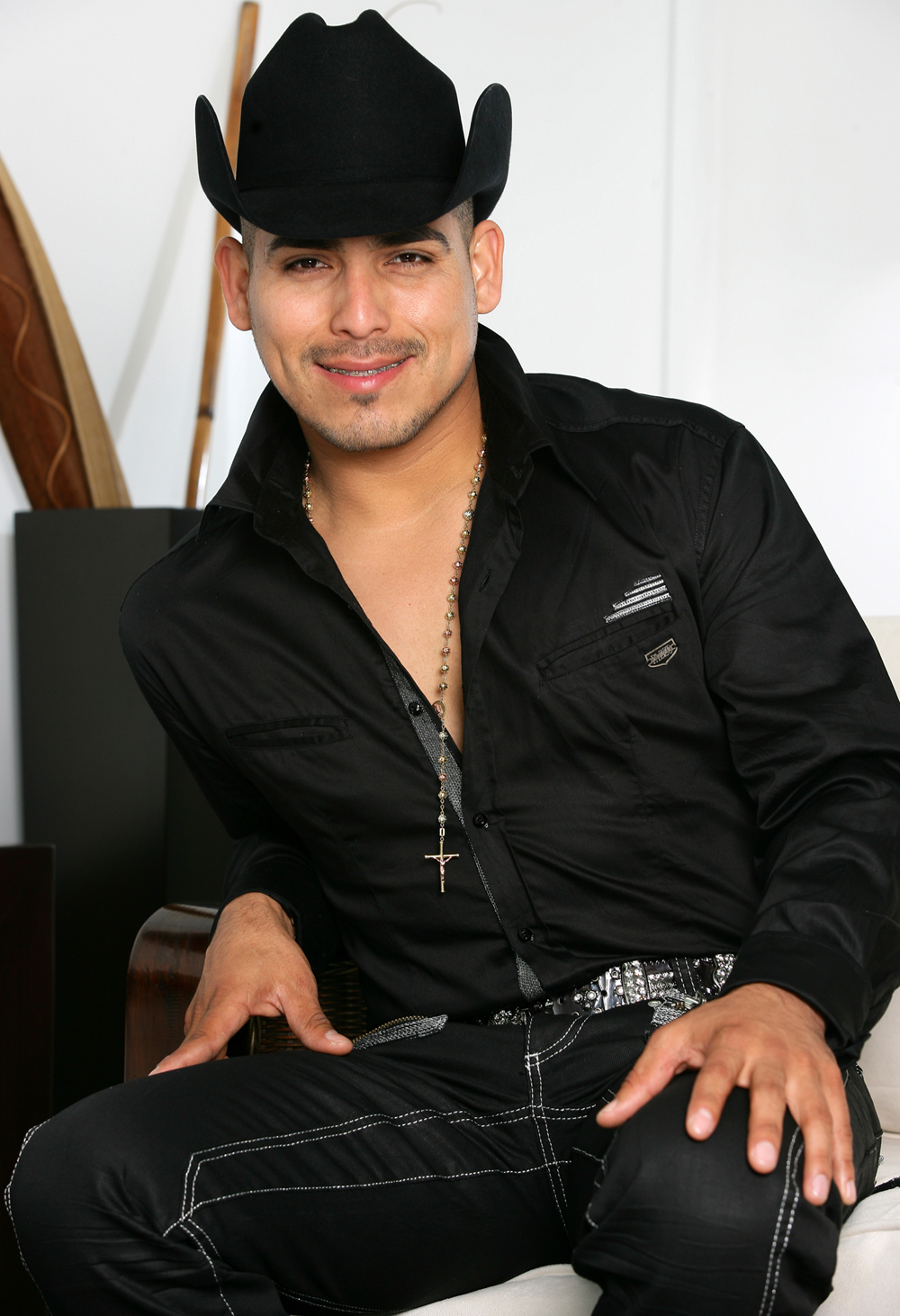
- Paz in 2010
Awards and nominations
Award	Wins	Nominations
BMI Latin Awards	62	62
Billboard Latin Music Awards	5	11
Latin Grammy Awards	0	5
Lo Nuestro Awards	8	10

Totals (Note: Certain award groups do not simply award one winner. They acknowledge several different recipients, have runners-up, and have third place. Since this is a specific recognition and is different from losing an award, runner-up mentions are considered wins in this award tally. For simplification and to avoid errors, each award in this list has been presumed to have had a prior nomination.)
- Wins: 102
- Nominations: 172

Espinoza Paz is a Mexican singer-songwriter and producer of Regional Mexican who has received various awards and nominations. He is credited to have shaped modern Mariachi music. He also wrote an estimated 4,000 to 5,000 songs, used by a varied of artists, including Jenni Rivera and Grupo Firme.

Through his career he garnered a number of Bandamax Awards, Billboard Latin Music Awards, Billboard Mexican Music Awards, Lo Nuestro Awards and Premios Juventud, among others. Espinoza is also a Latin Grammy Awards nominee, and the most awarded regional Mexican artist in the BMI Latin Awards. He also became the first artist to receive twice an award in Lunas del Auditorio when he was named Artist Revelation and Grupera Artist in 2011.

He was named Artist of the Decade by Premios de la Radio, and received a special Orgullo Latino Award from the same organization.

== Awards and nominations ==
Award/organization (Note: Charts are not included, unless they are explicitly described as "awards" or specific trophies are given.)	Year	Nominee/work	Category	Result	Ref.
Bandamax Awards	2012	Espinoza Paz	Composer of the Year	Nominated	
Bandamax Awards	2012	Espinoza Paz	Solo Artist of the Year	Won	
Bandamax Awards	2014	Espinoza Paz	Most Influential Singer on Social Media	Nominated	
Bandamax Awards	2015	Espinoza Paz	Solo Artist of the Year	Won	
Bandamax Awards	2015	Espinoza Paz	Composer of the Year	Nominated	
Bandamax Awards	2016	Espinoza Paz	Composer of the Year	Nominated	
Bandamax Awards	2018	Espinoza Paz	Composer of the Year	Nominated	
Bandamax Awards	2018	Espinoza Paz	Solo Artist of the Year	Won	
Bandamax Awards	2022	Espinoza Paz	Comeback of the Year	Won	
Billboard Latin Music Awards	2009	Espinoza Paz	Songwriter of the Year	Won	
Billboard Latin Music Awards	2009	"El Proximo Viernes"	Regional Mexican Airplay Song of the Year, Male	Nominated	
Billboard Latin Music Awards	2010	Espinoza Paz	Songwriter of the Year	Won	
Billboard Latin Music Awards	2010	Espinoza Paz	Regional Mexican Airplay Artist of the Year, Male	Won	
Billboard Latin Music Awards	2011	Espinoza Paz	Songwriter of the Year	Won	
Billboard Latin Music Awards	2011	Espinoza Paz	Regional Mexican Airplay Artist of the Year, Solo	Nominated	
Billboard Latin Music Awards	2011	Espinoza Paz	Regional Mexican Albums Artist of the Year, Solo	Nominated	
Billboard Latin Music Awards	2013	Espinoza Paz	Songwriter of the Year	Won	
Billboard Latin Music Awards	2013	"Un Hombre Normal"	Regional Mexican Song of the Year	Nominated	
Billboard Latin Music Awards	2014	Espinoza Paz	Songwriter of the Year	Nominated	
Billboard Latin Music Awards	2017	Espinoza Paz	Regional Mexican Albums Artist of the Year, Solo	Nominated	
Billboard Mexican Music Awards	2011	Espinoza Paz	Artist of the Year	Nominated	
Billboard Mexican Music Awards	2011	Espinoza Paz	Artist of the Year, Male	Nominated	
Billboard Mexican Music Awards	2011	Espinoza Paz	Songs Artist of the Year	Nominated	
Billboard Mexican Music Awards	2011	Espinoza Paz	Airplay of the Year	Nominated	
Billboard Mexican Music Awards	2011	Espinoza Paz	Digital Download Artist of the Year	Nominated	
Billboard Mexican Music Awards	2011	Espinoza Paz	Banda Artist of the Year	Won	
Billboard Mexican Music Awards	2011	Espinoza Paz	Songwriter Artist of the Year	Nominated	
Billboard Mexican Music Awards	2011	Espinoza Paz	Producer Artist of the Year	Nominated	
Billboard Mexican Music Awards	2011	Del Rancho Para El Mundo	Banda Album of the Year	Nominated	
Billboard Mexican Music Awards	2012	Espinoza Paz	Artist of the Year	Nominated	
Billboard Mexican Music Awards	2012	Espinoza Paz	Artist of the Year, Male	Nominated	
Billboard Mexican Music Awards	2012	Espinoza Paz	Songs Artist of the Year	Nominated	
Billboard Mexican Music Awards	2012	Espinoza Paz	Digital Download Artist of the Year	Nominated	
Billboard Mexican Music Awards	2012	Espinoza Paz	Albums Artist of the Year	Nominated	
Billboard Mexican Music Awards	2012	Espinoza Paz	Banda Artist of the Year	Won	
Billboard Mexican Music Awards	2012	Espinoza Paz	Songwriter Artist of the Year	Nominated	
Billboard Mexican Music Awards	2012	Espinoza Paz	Producer Artist of the Year	Nominated	
Billboard Mexican Music Awards	2012	Canciones Que Duelen	Banda Album of the Year	Nominated	
Billboard Mexican Music Awards	2012	Un Hombre Normal	Banda Album of the Year	Nominated	
Billboard Mexican Music Awards	2012	"Para No Perderte"	Norteño Song of the Year	Nominated	
Billboard Mexican Music Awards	2013	Espinoza Paz	Songwriter of the Year	Won	
BMI Latin Awards	2008	Espinoza Paz	Latin Songwriter of the Year	Won	
BMI Latin Awards	2008	"Mil Heridas"	Award-Winning Songs	Won	
BMI Latin Awards	2008	"Prohibido"	Award-Winning Songs	Won	
BMI Latin Awards	2008	"Te Compro"	Award-Winning Songs	Won	
BMI Latin Awards	2009	"El Vaso Derrama"	Award-Winning Songs	Won	
BMI Latin Awards	2009	"La Rata Flaca"	Award-Winning Songs	Won	
BMI Latin Awards	2009	"Olvídame Tú"	Award-Winning Songs	Won	
BMI Latin Awards	2009	"Para Impresionarte"	Award-Winning Songs	Won	
BMI Latin Awards	2009	"Perdóname"	Award-Winning Songs	Won	
BMI Latin Awards	2009	"Sobre Mis Pies"	Award-Winning Songs	Won	
BMI Latin Awards	2009	Espinoza Paz	Latin Songwriter of the Year	Won	
BMI Latin Awards	2010	Espinoza Paz	Latin Songwriter of the Year	Won	
BMI Latin Awards	2010	"Aunque Tengas La Razón"	Award-Winning Song	Won	
BMI Latin Awards	2010	"Cita Con Un Invento"	Award-Winning Song	Won	
BMI Latin Awards	2010	"El Amor En Carro"	Award-Winning Song	Won	
BMI Latin Awards	2010	"El Paletero"	Award-Winning Song	Won	
BMI Latin Awards	2010	"El Próximo Viernes"	Award-Winning Song	Won	
BMI Latin Awards	2010	"Espero"	Award-Winning Song	Won	
BMI Latin Awards	2010	"Inolvidable"	Award-Winning Song	Won	
BMI Latin Awards	2010	"Vive Y Déjame Vivir"	Award-Winning Song	Won	
BMI Latin Awards	2011	"Como Un Tatuaje"	Award-Winning Song	Won	
BMI Latin Awards	2011	"Lo Intentamos"	Award-Winning Song	Won	
BMI Latin Awards	2011	"Lo Intentamos"	Latin Song of the Year	Won	
BMI Latin Awards	2012	Espinoza Paz	Latin Songwriters of the Year	Won	
BMI Latin Awards	2012	"Te Siento"	Award-Winning Songs	Won	
BMI Latin Awards	2012	"Al Diablo Lo Nuestro"	Award-Winning Songs	Won	
BMI Latin Awards	2012	"Amarte A La Antigua"	Award-Winning Songs	Won	
BMI Latin Awards	2012	"La Escuelita"	Award-Winning Songs	Won	
BMI Latin Awards	2012	"Ponte En Mi Lugar"	Award-Winning Songs	Won	
BMI Latin Awards	2012	"Quiereme Pa' Que Te Quieran"	Award-Winning Songs	Won	
BMI Latin Awards	2013	"¿Dónde Estas Presumida?"	Award-Winning Songs	Won	
BMI Latin Awards	2013	"El Culpable"	Award-Winning Songs	Won	
BMI Latin Awards	2013	"Para No Perderte"	Award-Winning Songs	Won	
BMI Latin Awards	2014	"Amor Express"	Award-Winning Songs	Won	
BMI Latin Awards	2014	"Cabecita Dura"	Award-Winning Songs	Won	
BMI Latin Awards	2014	"Necesita Un Hombre"	Award-Winning Songs	Won	
BMI Latin Awards	2014	"Si Mañana No Me Ves"	Award-Winning Songs	Won	
BMI Latin Awards	2014	"Te Mirabas Más Bonita"	Award-Winning Songs	Won	
BMI Latin Awards	2014	Espinoza Paz	Latin Songwriter of the Year	Won	
BMI Latin Awards	2015	"El Ruido de tus Zapatos"	Latin Song of 2014	Won	
BMI Latin Awards	2015	"El Ruido de tus Zapatos"	Award-Winning Songs	Won	
BMI Latin Awards	2015	"Relación Clandestina"	Award-Winning Songs	Won	
BMI Latin Awards	2015	"Te la Pasas"	Award-Winning Songs	Won	
BMI Latin Awards	2015	"Un Fin En Culiacán"	Award-Winning Songs	Won	
BMI Latin Awards	2016	"¿Porque la Engañé?"	Award-Winning Songs	Won	
BMI Latin Awards	2016	"Se Me Sigue Notando"	Award-Winning Songs	Won	
BMI Latin Awards	2017	"A Lo Mejor"	Award-Winning Songs	Won	
BMI Latin Awards	2017	"Después De Ti, ¿Quién?"	Award-Winning Songs	Won	
BMI Latin Awards	2017	"¿Y Qué Ha Sido De Ti?"	Award-Winning Songs	Won	
BMI Latin Awards	2018	"Te Dirán"	Award-Winning Songs	Won	
BMI Latin Awards	2018	"¿Desde Cuándo No Me Quieres?"	Award-Winning Songs	Won	
BMI Latin Awards	2019	"Ésta Es Tu Canción"	Award-Winning Songs	Won	
BMI Latin Awards	2019	"Las Cosas No Se Hacen Así"	Award-Winning Songs	Won	
BMI Latin Awards	2019	"Ojalá Que Me Olvides"	Award-Winning Songs	Won	
BMI Latin Awards	2019	Espinoza Paz	Regional Mexican Songwriter of the Year	Won	
BMI Latin Awards	2020	"Mejor Me Alejo"	Most-Performed Songs	Won	
BMI Latin Awards	2020	"No Me Chinges La Vida"	Most-Performed Songs	Won	
BMI Latin Awards	2020	"Calidad y Cantidad"	Most-Performed Songs	Won	
BMI Latin Awards	2021	"Tiene Razón la Lógica"	Most-Performed Songs	Won	
BMI Latin Awards	2021	"No Elegí Conocerte"	Most-Performed Songs	Won	
BMI Latin Awards	2022	"Como Si You Fuera Pastel"	Most-Performed Songs	Won	
BMI Latin Awards	2023	"Cómo Te Olvido"	Most-Performed Songs	Won	
Fan Choice Awards (Mexico) (Note: A Mexican fan-voted award.)	2023	Espinoza Paz	Mariachi/Ranchera Artist	Nominated	
Furia Musical Awards	2008	Espinoza Paz	Composer of the Year	Won	
Galardón a los Grandes (Mexico) (Note: An award given by Raul Velasco in Siempre en Domingo.)	2010	"Lo Intentamos"	Most Watched Video	Nominated	
Galardón a los Grandes (Mexico)	2010	"Lo Intentamos"	Catchiest Regional Mexican Song	Nominated	
Juventud Awards	2010	Espinoza Paz	Voice of the Moment	Won	
Juventud Awards	2010	Espinoza Paz	Favorite Regional Mexican Artist	Won	
Juventud Awards	2011	Espinoza Paz	Voice of the Moment	Nominated	
Juventud Awards	2011	Espinoza Paz	Favorite Regional Mexican Artist	Nominated	
Juventud Awards	2012	Espinoza Paz	Voice of the Moment	Nominated	
Juventud Awards	2012	Espinoza Paz	Favorite Regional Mexican Artist	Won	
Juventud Awards	2012	"Me Voy" (Paulina Rubio featuring Espinoza Paz)	The Perfect Combination	Nominated	
Juventud Awards	2015	"¿Porqué la engañé?"	Favorite Lyrics	Nominated	
Juventud Awards	2019	Espinoza Paz	Best Singer-Songwriter	Nominated	
Latin Grammy Awards	2009	"Espero"	Best Regional Mexican Song	Nominated	
Latin Grammy Awards	2011	Del Rancho Para El Mundo	Best Banda Album	Nominated	
Latin Grammy Awards	2015	"Perdí La Pose"	Best Regional Mexican Song	Nominated	
Latin Grammy Awards	2016	"Te Dirán"	Best Regional Mexican Song	Nominated	
Latin Grammy Awards	2017	"Compromiso Descartado"	Best Regional Mexican Song	Nominated	
Latino Show Music Awards (Colombia)	2018	Espinoza Paz	Best Mexican Regional Artist	Nominated	
Latino Show Music Awards (Colombia)	2019	Espinoza Paz	Best Mexican Regional Artist	Nominated	
Latino Show Music Awards (Colombia)	2021	Espinoza Paz	Best Male Solo or Group — Mexican Regional	Nominated	
Latino Show Music Awards (Colombia)	2022	Espinoza Paz	Best Male Solo or Group — Mexican Regional	Nominated	
Latino Show Music Awards (Colombia)	2022	Espinoza Paz	Best Producer — Regional Mexican Music	Nominated	
Latino Show Music Awards (Colombia)	2022	"El Soltero Feliz"	Best Regional Mexican Song	Nominated	
Latino Show Music Awards (Colombia)	2022	"El Soltero Feliz"	Best Video — Regional Mexican	Nominated	
Lo Nuestro Awards	2010	Espinoza Paz	Regional Mexican Male Artist of the Year	Won	
Lo Nuestro Awards	2010	Espinoza Paz	Banda of the Year	Won	
Lo Nuestro Awards	2010	"Lo Intentamos"	Regional Mexican Song of the Year	Won	
Lo Nuestro Awards	2011	Espinoza Paz	Regional Mexican Male Artist of the Year	Won	
Lo Nuestro Awards	2011	Espinoza Paz	Banda of the Year	Won	
Lo Nuestro Awards	2012	Espinoza Paz	Regional Mexican Male Artist of the Year	Won	
Lo Nuestro Awards	2013	Espinoza Paz	Regional Mexican Male Artist of the Year	Won	
Lo Nuestro Awards	2013	"Un Hombre Normal"	Pop Song of the Year	Nominated	
Lo Nuestro Awards	2015	"Te la Pasas" (Tito Torbellino featuring Espinoza Paz)	Regional Mexican Collaboration of the Year	Won	
Lo Nuestro Awards	2020	"Tiene razón la lógica" (La Arrolladora Banda El Limón featuring Espinoza Paz)	Regional Mexican Collaboration of the Year	Nominated	
Lunas del Auditorio	2011	Espinoza Paz	Artist Revelation of the Year	Won	
Lunas del Auditorio	2011	Espinoza Paz	Grupera Artist of the Year	Won	
Lunas del Auditorio	2012	Espinoza Paz	Grupera Artist of the Year	Nominated	
Monitor Latino Awards	2010	"Intocable"	Hot Song of the Year	Nominated	
People en Español Awards	2010	Espinoza Paz	Best Solo Artist or Group, Regional Mexican	Nominated	
Premios Oye!	2012	Espinoza Paz	Solo Artist or Group, Banda Music	Won	
Premios Oye!	2012	Espinoza Paz	Banda Group of the Year	Nominated	
Premios Oye!	2012	Canciones que duelen	Popular Album	Nominated	
Premios Oye!	2012	Del rancho para el mundo	Popular Album	Nominated	
Premios Oye!	2012	"Para no perderte"	Popular Song	Nominated	
Premios Oye!	2012	"Al diablo lo nuestro"	Popular Song	Nominated	
Premios Oye!	2013	"Un Hombre Normal"	Popular Song	Won	
Premios de la Radio (Mexico)	2009	"Lo Intentamos"	Banda Song of the Year	Nominated	
Premios de la Radio (Mexico)	2009	Espinoza Paz	Male Artist of the Year	Won	
Premios de la Radio (Mexico)	2009	Espinoza Paz	Most Handsome	Won	
Premios de la Radio (Mexico)	2010	Espinoza Paz	Composer of the Year	Won	
Premios de la Radio (Mexico)	2010	Espinoza Paz	Artist of the Year	Won	
Premios de la Radio (Mexico)	2010	Espinoza Paz	Solo Male Artist of the Year	Won	
Premios de la Radio (Mexico)	2011	Espinoza Paz	Artist of the Year	Won	
Premios de la Radio (Mexico)	2011	"Culpable"	Banda Song of the Year	Won	
Premios de la Radio (Mexico)	2012	Espinoza Paz	Male Artist of the Year	Nominated	
Premios de la Radio (Mexico)	2012	Espinoza Paz	Artist of the Year	Nominated	
Premios de la Radio (Mexico)	2012	"Hombre Normal"	Banda Song of the Year	Nominated	
Premios de la Radio (Mexico)	2012	Canciones que Duelen	Norteño Album of the Year	Nominated	
Premios de la Radio (Mexico)	2013	"No Llega el Olvido" (with Jenni Rivera)	Collaboration of the Year	Won	
Premios de la Radio (Mexico)	2013	Espinoza Paz	Artist of the Decade	Honoree	
Premios de la Radio (Mexico)	2015	Espinoza Paz	Orgullo Latino Award	Nominated	
Premios de la Radio (Mexico)	2018	"No Me Friegues la Vida"	Mariachi Song of the Year	Nominated	
Premios de la Radio (Mexico)	2019	"Tiene Razón la Lógica" (with La Arrolladora Banda El Limón)	Collaboration of the Year	Nominated	
Premios de la Radio (Mexico)	2022	Espinoza Paz	Orgullo Latino Award	Honoree	
Premios de la Radio (Mexico)	2022	"La Mushasha Shula"	Mariachi Song of the Year	Nominated	
Premios La Mejor	2021	Espinoza Paz	Composer of the Year	Nominated	
Sociedad de Autores y Compositores de México (SACM)	2016	"Después de ti, ¿quién?"	Éxito SACM 2016	Won	
Sociedad de Autores y Compositores de México (SACM)	2017	"Te dirán"	Éxito SACM 2017	Won	
Your World Awards	2012	"Un Hombre Normal"	Song That Steals My Heart	Nominated	
Your World Awards	2014	Espinoza Paz	Favorite Band	Nominated	
