= Viva Tour (album) =

Viva Tour (En Vivo)

Live album by Thalía
- Released: November 12, 2013
- Recorded: April 26–27, 2013
- Venue: Mexico City, Mexico
- Genre: Latin pop
- Length: 80:00
- Label: Sony Music Latin, Sony Music Entertainment

Thalía chronology
Habítame Siempre (2012)	Viva Tour (En Vivo) (2013)	Thalía (2013)

Singles from Viva Tour
- 1. "La Apuesta" Released: October 22, 2013

Viva Tour (En Vivo) is the second live album by Mexican singer Thalía. It was released on November 12, 2013, by Sony Music Mexico in Mexico and was released in the United States on December 1, 2013, by Sony Music Latin and later on globally by Sony Music Entertainment. The album was released as a full concert on the following formats : CD + DVD, DVD and Blu-ray Disc. The DVD format includes also a behind-the-scenes documentary about Thalia's preparation for the tour. The concert was recorded on April 26 and 27, 2013 at the National Auditorium of Mexico City, during the tour's last concerts.

== Commercial performance ==
In Mexico, after 15 days of its released reached the Gold status for sales of over 30,000 copies.

== DVD track listing ==
1. "Atmósfera"
2. Qué Será De Ti
3. "Tómame O Déjame"
4. "Habítame Siempre"
5. Medley
  1. "Cómo"
  2. "Enséñame A Vivir"
6. "Con Los Años Que Me Quedan" (performed with Leonel García, Samo and Jesús Navarro of Reik)
7. "No Soy El Aire"
8. "Hoy Ten Miedo De Mí"
9. "Manías"
10. "Mujeres" (performed with María José)
11. "Equivocada"
12. Medley Novelas
  1. "Quinceañera"
  2. "Rosalinda"
  3. "Marimar"
  4. "María La Del Barrio"
13. "La Apuesta" (performed with Erik Rubín)
14. Medley NY
  1. "No Me Enseñaste" (Remix)
  2. "Tú Y Yo (Remix)"
  3. "Entre El Mar Y Una Estrella" (Pablo Flores Club Mix)
  4. "Piel Morena (Remix)"
15. "Amor A La Mexicana"
16. Medley Hits
  1. "Seducción"
  2. "¿A Quién Le Importa?"
  3. "Arrasando"

== CD track listing ==
1. "Atmósfera"
2. Qué Será De Ti
3. "Tómame O Déjame"
4. "Habítame Siempre"
5. Medley
  1. "Cómo"
  2. "Enséñame A Vivir"
6. "Con Los Años Que Me Quedan" (performed with Leonel García, Samo and Jesús Navarro of Reik)
7. "No Soy El Aire"
8. "Hoy Ten Miedo De Mí"
9. "Manías"
10. "Mujeres" (performed with María José)
11. "Equivocada"
12. Medley Novelas
  1. "Quinceañera"
  2. "Rosalinda"
  3. "Marimar"
  4. "María La Del Barrio"
13. "La Apuesta" (performed with Erik Rubín)
14. Medley NY
  1. "No Me Enseñaste" (Remix)
  2. "Tú Y Yo (Remix)"
  3. "Entre El Mar Y Una Estrella" (Pablo Flores Club Mix)
  4. "Piel Morena" (Remix)"
15. "Amor A La Mexicana"
16. Medley Hits
  1. "Seducción"
  2. "¿A Quién Le Importa?"
  3. "Arrasando"

== Charts ==
=== Weekly charts ===
Chart (2013)	Position
Mexican Albums Chart	5

=== Year-end charts ===
Chart (2013)	Position
Mexico (Mexican Albums Chart)	68

== Certifications and sales ==
Region	Certification	Certified units/sales
Mexico (AMPROFON)	Gold	30,000^{^}
^{^} Shipments figures based on certification alone.

== Release history ==
Country	Date	Format(s)
Mexico	November 12, 2013	Compact disc + DVD, DVD
Mexico	November 20, 2013	Blu-ray Disc
Spain	November 19, 2013	Digital download
United States	December 1, 2013	Compact disc + DVD, DVD, Blu-ray Disc
Worldwide	December 1, 2013	Digital download
