= Te Perdiste Mi Amor =

Single by Thalía featuring Prince Royce

from the album Habítame Siempre
- Released: February 3, 2013
- Recorded: 2012
- Genre: Latin pop; bachata
- Length: 3:40
- Label: Sony Music
- Songwriters: Prince Royce; Guianko Gómez; Jorge Luis Chacín
- Producers: Prince Royce; Guianko "Yanko" Gómez; Efraín "Junito" Dávila

Thalía singles chronology
"The Way You Look Tonight" (2012)	"Te Perdiste Mi Amor" (2013)	"La Apuesta" (2013)

Prince Royce singles chronology
"Te Me Vas" (2012)	"Te Perdiste Mi Amor" (2013)	"Darte un Beso" (2013)

"Te Perdiste Mi Amor" (English: "You Lost My Love") is a Latin pop-bachata song recorded by Mexican recording artist Thalía featuring American singer-songwriter Prince Royce, and included in Thalía's eleventh studio album Habítame Siempre (2012). The song was written by Royce, Guianko Gómez and Jorge Luis Chacín, while it was produced by the first two and Efraín "Junito" Dávila. It was released as the second single from Habítame Siempre on February 3, 2013.

== Music and lyrics ==
"Te perdiste mi amor" is a typical modern bachata collaboration with an up-tempo beat and a catchy chorus. The song includes some of its lyrics in English Thalía and Prince Royce in the recurrent lyrics : "I wanna know, just let me know, how could you let me walk away? [...] how could you just take my love away?" and in some other parts of the song.

Within Habítame Siempre's booklet, Thalía cited some of her thoughts regarding to this song, stating : "It's never late to rectify. When the destiny is fine, and wants to reward you, good forgiveness and a big love will be the recompense." Generally, the lyrics of the song are about a man or a woman that was entirely devoted to their partner, but their love was somehow underappreciated. The last lyric of the song is very optimistic, though, as the last line means : "I don't know what happened to us, why don't we try...again?". This is also Thalía's second duet performed in bachata, the first being song "No, no, no" in 2006 with Romeo Santos. "Te Perdiste Mi Amor" was officially remixed by Jump Smokers! and released in this version on February 11, 2013.

Thalía herself has described the song as "a mixture of pop and bachata music" since it contains elements of both music genres.

== Promotion ==
=== Live performances ===
Thalía performed the song with Prince Royce in a special TV concert for her album Habítame Siempre. Their performance was broadcast on Univision Network in the United States on November 18, 2012 and Televisa Network in Mexico on November 24, 2012.

They also performed the song live in the 25th anniversary show of Lo Nuestro Awards, which was broadcast by Univision on February 21, 2013. Thalía included the song on the setlist of her VIVA! Tour concerts and has performed it in all the US dates so far.

=== Music video ===
The official music video for the song premiered on VEVO on March 5, 2013. The video includes Thalía and Prince Royce's performance in Hammerstein Ballroom, as well as plenty of backstage footage. In April, 2014 the music video has 35.000.0000 views on VEVO. The music video has over 100 million views on YouTube and is the second VEVO Certified of the artist, succeeding Equivocada. The video was produced by Emilio Estefan.

== Commercial performance ==
"Te perdiste mi amor" entered the US Billboard at #24 on the Latin Pop Songs chart, with its peak position at #3, while it debuted at #20 on the Tropical Songs chart, peaking at #7. In the Hot Latin Songs chart, the song peaked at #4. In addition, the song reached the #1 on Billboard Latin Airplay List, making her the only woman to do so in that year (2013). The song peaked at #1 in Mexico on the Spanish Airplay chart, as published by Billboard.

== Track listing ==
- Digital download
1. "Te Perdiste Mi Amor (Album version)" – 3:40
2. "Te Perdiste Mi Amor (Radio Edit)" - 3:38
3. "Te Perdiste Mi Amor (Jump Smokers Remix)" - 3:55

== Charts ==
=== Weekly charts ===
Chart (2013)	Peak position
Mexico (Billboard Espanol Airplay)	1
Mexico (Monitor Latino)	6
US Hot Latin Songs (Billboard)	4
US Latin Airplay (Billboard)	1
US Latin Pop Airplay (Billboard)	3
US Tropical Airplay (Billboard)	7

=== Year-end charts ===
Chart (2013)	Position
Argentina Digital Sales (CAPIF)	8
México (Monitor Latino)	47
US Hot Latin Songs (Billboard)	19
US Latin Pop Songs (Billboard)	10

== Certifications and sales ==
Region	Certification	Certified units/sales
Mexico (AMPROFON)	3× Platinum+Gold	210,000^{‡}
^{‡} Sales+streaming figures based on certification alone.

== Release history ==
Region	Date	Format
Worldwide	February 3, 2013	Digital download
United States	February 5, 2013	Spanish Contemporary airplay
United States	February 5, 2013	Latin Tropical airplay

== Credits and personnel ==
- Interpreters – Thalía, Prince Royce
- Producer – Prince Royce
- Co-producers – "Yanko" Gomez, Efraín "Junito" Dávila
- Production coordinator – Héctor Rubén Rivera
- Recording engineer – Guianko "Yanko" Gomez
- Voice engineer – Pablo Arraya
- Arrangements – Efraín "Junito" Dávila
- Piano and keyboards – Efraín "Junito" Dávila
- Guitar – Steven Cruz
- Percussion – Raul Bier
- Güira – Christopher "Chapo" Vegazo
- Bass – Christopher Mercedes
- Mixed by – Alfredo Matheus
- Remixed by – Jump Smokers!
- (P) 2012 Sony Music Entertainment US Latin LLC

== See also ==
- List of Billboard number-one Latin songs of 2013
