= El Próximo Viernes =

2008 song by Espinoza Paz

Single by Espinoza Paz

from the album El Canta Autor del Pueblo
- Released: 2008
- Genre: Banda ballad
- Length: 4:09
- Label: American Show Latin/Machete Regio
- Songwriter: Espinoza Paz

"El Próximo Viernes" (English: Next Friday) is a song by regional Mexican singer-songwriter Espinoza Paz from his 2008 debut album El Canta Autor del Pueblo.

== Music video ==
The official music video for the song was released in 2008 and shows Paz singing the song while playing the guitar.

== Charts ==
Chart (2008)	Peak position
US Hot Latin Songs (Billboard)	14

=== Year-end charts ===
Chart (2009)	Position
US Hot Latin Songs (Billboard)	55

== Thalía version ==
"El Próximo Viernes"

Single by Thalía

from the album Primera fila
- Released: 23 November 2009 / 20 June 2011
- Recorded: 30 July 2009 in Miami, Florida
- Genre: Acoustic music, Latin pop
- Length: 4:09
- Label: Sony Music
- Songwriter: Espinoza Paz
- Producer: Áureo Baqueiro

Thalía singles chronology
""Enséñame a vivir"" (2010)	"El Próximo Viernes" (2011)	""Manías"" (2012)

Mexican singer Thalía released a pop version of the song as the sixth single from her live album Primera fila. It was released on iTunes as a promotional single in 2009. Then in 2011, after four smash hit singles, it was also released as a commercial and airplay single. The song was popular and had heavy radio airplay. The single was well received by the public. It was a best seller on iTunes and general stores.

=== Music video ===
The official music video for the song was the performance from the live concert and DVD recorded in 2009.

=== Certifications ===
Region	Certification	Certified units/sales
Mexico (AMPROFON)	Platinum	60,000^{*}
^{*} Sales figures based on certification alone.
