= Canciones Que Duelen =

Studio album by Espinoza Paz
- Released: September 27, 2011
- Genre: Norteño
- Length: 42:59
- Label: Disa
- Producer: Espinoza Paz

Espinoza Paz chronology
Del Rancho Para el Mundo (2010)	Canciones Que Duelen (2011)

Singles from Canciones Que Duelen
- 1. "Para No Perderte" Released: March 2011

Canciones Que Duelen (Songs That Hurt) is the fourth studio album by regional Mexican recording artist Espinoza Paz. It was released by Disa Records on September 27, 2011, one year after the release of his previous studio album. Espinoza Paz worked as producer and songwriter of all the tracks included. The album entered at number one in the Billboard's Latin Albums and Regional Mexican Albums charts, while peaking atop the albums chart in Mexico. The first single, "Para No Perderte", reached the top twenty of the Billboard Top Latin Songs chart. A DVD with music videos to all the songs is included on the deluxe edition of the album.

== Background ==
Following the success of his previous studio albums, Espinoza Paz agreed to participate as a coach in the Mexican version of the reality show The Voice. The show resulted in a rating success in the country. During this period the singer decided to release his fourth studio album, after his personal management and the record label worked together to convince him. "These songs were just for me, but I was told that I had to share it with my fans," Espinoza Paz said about the release. Two weeks before the release of Canciones Que Duelen, the singer received his first Latin Grammy Award nomination as a performer for his album Del Rancho Para el Pueblo.

== Repertoire ==
Canciones Que Duelen includes 12 new songs written by Espinoza Paz, and a "norteño" version of "El Culpable", the last single from his previous album. According to the singer all the tracks included are very personal to him, especially "Fuiste Mía Alguna Vez" ("You Were Mine Once") which reminds him of a previous love relationship; also, "Tus Ojos" ("Your Eyes") and "Madrecita Querida" ("Dear Mother") are very close to his feelings. "The songs are based by the experiences I've had with love, and not necessarily with several women, because with one single love relationship I can be inspired to write many songs," Espinoza Paz stated about his inspiration for the album.

== Chart performance ==
In the United States, the album debuted and peaked at number one in the Billboard Latin Albums, becoming his second number-one album, after Yo No Canto, Pero Lo Intentamos in 2009. On the Regional Mexican Albums chart, Canciones Que Duelen is the third number-one album for Espinoza Paz. At the Mexican Albums Chart Canciones Que Duelen debuted at number two, climbing to number one two weeks later.

== Charts ==
=== Weekly charts ===
Chart (2011)	Peak position
Mexican Albums (Top 100 Mexico)	1
US Billboard 200	121
US Top Latin Albums (Billboard)	1
US Regional Mexican Albums (Billboard)	1

=== Year-end charts ===
Chart (2011)	Position
US Top Latin Albums (Billboard)	61
Chart (2012)	Position
US Top Latin Albums (Billboard)	55

=== Album certification ===
Region	Certification	Certified units/sales
Mexico (AMPROFON)	Platinum+Gold	90,000^{^}
United States (RIAA)	Gold (Latin)	50,000^{^}
^{^} Shipments figures based on certification alone.

== Track listing ==
All tracks are written by Espinoza Paz.

No.	Title	Length
1.	"A Tí Mujer"	3:26
2.	"Confiésale"	3:20
3.	"Del Rancho a La Ciudad"	3:16
4.	"Devastado"	3:10
5.	"El Camino Más Corto"	2:54
6.	"El Culpable [Norteña]"	3:38
7.	"Para No Perderte"	2:43
8.	"Fuiste Mía Alguna Vez"	3:25
9.	"Imperfecto"	3:42
10.	"Mujer"	3:29
11.	"Por Qué"	3:35
12.	"Te Dije"	3:36
13.	"Una Señal"	2:45

== See also ==
- 2011 in Latin music
- List of number-one Billboard Latin Albums from the 2010s
- List of number-one albums of 2011 (Mexico)
