= Del Rancho Para el Mundo =

Studio album by Espinoza Paz
- Released: 10 August 2010
- Genre: Banda
- Label: Disa

Espinoza Paz chronology
| Yo No Canto, Pero Lo Intentamos (2008) | Del Rancho Para el Mundo (2010) | Canciones Que Duelen (2010) |

Del Rancho Para el Mundo (From the Ranch to the World) is the Latin Grammy Award nominated third studio album by regional Mexican recording artist Espinoza Paz. It was released on 10 August 2010 by Disa Records.

== Track listing ==
All songs were composed by Espinoza Paz.

1. Te Voy A Extrañar 3:09
2. El Culpable 3:50
3. Niña Bien 2:41
4. Al Diablo Lo Nuestro 4:01
5. Indestructible 3:18
6. Volver 4:12
7. Kilometros De Aquí 3:29
8. Esta Es Pa´ Mi Viejo 3:23
9. Calles De Tierra 3:39
10. Mis Amistades 3:47
11. 24 Horas 3:29

== Charts ==
=== Weekly charts ===
| Chart (2010) | Peak position |
|---|---|
| US Billboard 200 | 66 |
| US Top Latin Albums (Billboard) | 2 |
| US Regional Mexican Albums (Billboard) | 1 |

=== Year-end charts ===
| Chart (2010) | Position |
|---|---|
| US Top Latin Albums (Billboard) | 31 |
| Chart (2011) | Position |
| US Top Latin Albums (Billboard) | 54 |

== Sales and certifications ==
| Region | Certification | Certified units/sales |
|---|---|---|
| United States (RIAA) | Gold (Latin) | 50,000^{^} |
^{^} Shipments figures based on certification alone.
