= Habítame Siempre =

Studio album by Thalía
- Released: November 19, 2012
- Recorded: 2011–2012
- Studio: London, UK (Sarm West Studios); Hollywood, United States (Conway Recording Studios, EastWest Studios, Capitol Studios, Phantom Vox Studios); Los Angeles, United States (Afterhours Studios, N'dahause Studios, Lionshare Studios); Puerto Rico, United States (Rolo Studios); New York City, United States (Avatar Studios, Sweatshop Studios, BiCoastal, ACME Studios); Weston, United States (Victoria Studios); San Rafael, United States (WallyWorld Studios); Miami, United States (GML Studios); Vancouver, Canada (Post Modern Sounds); Buenos Aires, Argentina (El Santito, Estudio Tónica); Chimalhuacán, Mexico (Cosmos Studios)
- Genre: Latin pop; pop rock; tropical
- Length: 47:35
- Label: Sony Music Latin; Sony
- Producer: Paul Forat; Walter Afanasieff; Cheche Alara; Armando Ávila; Humberto Gatica

Thalía chronology
Primera fila (2009)	Habítame Siempre (2012)	Viva Tour (2013)

Singles from Habítame Siempre
- 1. "Manías" Released: October 8, 2012; 2. "Te perdiste mi amor" Released: February 3, 2013; 3. "La Apuesta" Released: October 22, 2013

Habítame Siempre (English: Live In Me Always) is the twelfth studio album by Mexican recording artist Thalía, released on November 19, 2012 by Sony Music Latin. The album consists of 15 tracks, including collaborations with Robbie Williams, Michael Bublé, Gilberto Santa Rosa, Prince Royce, Erik Rubin, Leonel García, Samuel Parra (Samo) and Jesús Navarro.

Thalía was influenced by several music styles on the album, as there are elements of pop rock balladry, bachata, salsa, mambo, bossa nova and even nueva trova, all of them combined with Thalia's Latin pop style.

Habítame Siempre marks Thalía's first studio album under the label of Sony Music Latin and her first studio recording since the release of Lunada in 2008, as well as a follow-up to her previous acoustic album, Primera Fila, which was one of the most successful Spanish-language albums of recent years. Habítame Siempre was certified triple platinum + Gold in Mexico for sales exceeding 210,000 copies, platinum in Venezuela and gold in the United States reaching at the #1 position in both the Top Latin and Latin Pop album charts, published by Billboard.

Upon its release, Habítame Siempre received mostly positive reviews from the majority of music critics, who praised Thalía's vocal performance and the overall production of the album and earned the Lo Nuestro Award for Pop Album of the Year. Thalía promoted the album with the VIVA! Tour. Habítame Siempre sold around half million copies worldwide.

== Background and concept ==
Habítame Siempre is Thalía's first studio album since the release of Lunada in 2008. She began to work in this music production some time after the huge success of her 2009 acoustic album Primera fila. The sudden death of her mother, as well as the birth of her second child were two very strong emotional moments Thalía passed through while preparing the album. As a result, many of the songs recorded for the album represent Thalía's current feelings and emotional situation. As she declared, the whole album Habítame Siempre (which means "Live in me always") is dedicated to the memory of her mother.

"This album has been one of the biggest challenges of my career. There was a contrast of emotions that brought out my deepest feelings; I cried, I laughed and enjoyed myself. On this record, I left the imprints of everything I had inside of me. The songs we selected were perfect for expressing all these emotions. I hope my fans enjoy it as much as I do…"

— Thalía stated about "Habitame Siempre".

She revealed the cover art of her album through her Instagram account almost a month before the official album release date, while the album title was already rumored to be Habítame Siempre since September, as her private concert at Hammerstein Ballroom was promoted under that title. In the cover, we can see Thalía smiling while she holds a traditional microphone, in a smoky brown background. On October 17, the album was officially presented in New York City, while a few days later, the song Habitame siempre leaked in various websites.

As Thalía stated in many interviews, working in the music material of Habítame Siempre functioned as a soul catharsis for her. She also went on to say that "releasing this album represents a sense of respite and some kind of freedom as well" since in the last 4 years she passed through intense situations like being affected by Lyme disease, losing her beloved mother and having a series of familiar conflicts with her sisters.

== Composition and music influences ==
Regarding to the composition of the album's material, Thalía stated : "they used to send me songs with deep feelings like pain, anguish and sorrow. In some way, Mario Domm from Camila, captured my big loss in a spirit of positivism. I was enchanted by how he could transform my pain of losing my mother into light, into something positive".

The album consists of both new songs and covers, as well as a series of highly anticipated collaborations with some of the greatest artists in contemporary music, like Robbie Williams, Michael Bublé, Prince Royce, Erik Rubin, Leonel García, Samo from Camila, Jesús Navarro from Reik and the legendary Latin icon Gilberto Santa Rosa.

"We sang the classic song 'Bésame mucho' with Michael Bublé, but we created a different version with tango elements, that make it really sexy. As for Robbie Williams, it was a dream that came through to collaborate with him since I really admire his work. I invited him to sing with me a 'mambo' song, Muñequita linda that was made popular by the voice of Nat King Cole. I knew he was the only one that could understand the irony of rescuing this classic mambo masterpiece. I sent the song to him, he loved the idea of recording it in Spanish, and the result was spectacular", said Thalía regarding to her collaborations with Michael Bublé and Robbie Williams.

In her interview with VEVO, Thalía stated that in her new album she has experimented with various sounds and musical styles, like bossa nova and other Latin music genres, apart from including pop-rock ballads and a salsa duet with Gilberto Santa Rosa. Thalía also recorded two guitar-only tracks, that have elements of Nueva trova, which is a Cuban music movement, as well as the song Regalito de Dios, which is inspired in the sound of Vallenato, a popular folk music genre that originated from Colombia. Furthermore, she even incorporated a bilingual bachata track in the album, a duet with Prince Royce, who is considered one of the most successful bachata performers in contemporary music. Generally, Habítame Siempre is considered one of the most complete albums in Thalía's career, since it includes elements and influences of various Latin music genres.

== Production ==
During the production process of Habítame Siempre, Thalía focused a lot on details to guarantee an exceptional quality of sound, as her desire was to offer to her audience the best produced album in her career. The album contains songs with profound meanings and a sentimental approach, as it was initially inspired in Thalía's mother, Yolanda Miranda, who died in May 2011. As Thalía herself stated : “Many songs of this new production were recorded while recalling all these years with my mother. Manías for example is a very strong song and one that I dedicate to her memory" and she added that "this album is entirely dedicated to her, to celebrate her, to honor her with these exceptional songs".

In Habítame Siempre Thalía worked with various music producers including Cheche Alara, Armando Ávila, Humberto Gatica, Walter Afanasieff, and in an intention to repeat the successful format of Primera fila, she worked again with Paul Forat, general director and producer of Sony Music Latin, and her husband Tommy Mottola who is the executive producer of the album. Regarding to her experience working with her husband Tommy Mottola, Thalía stated: "He has always been present, offering me his wise advice...He is the executive producer of the album and he worked so that everything happens as I desired, he wants me to achieve all of my ambitions and it is a miracle. The album is full of surprises".

== Promotion ==
On September 21, 2012, Thalia performed live various songs from the album in a private concert in New York City at Hammerstein Ballroom. This special concert was broadcast on Univision a day before the official release of the album in the United States as a form of promotion for the album in the week of its release. On March 12, 2013 Thalía visited Spain in order to promote the album and receive an award by Cadena Dial. She also recorded various songs of this album and the previous one in Portuguese, as a tribute to her fan base in Brazil.

=== Singles ===
The lead single from Habítame Siempre, "Manías", was released digitally on October 8, 2012. It was incorporated in the Spanish contemporary format of the US radio some weeks later. The song peaked at the first position in Mexico's airplay chart, according to Billboard, remaining for many weeks within the top 5 positions and becoming a huge radio success. In the United States, the song debuted in the position number 36 of the Latin pop chart of Billboard and peaked at #14. In the top Latin songs chart published by Billboard, the song peaked at #26. The official music video of the song premiered on VEVO on December 18, 2012. In Spain, the single peaked at #35, in the Spanish airplay chart published by PROMUSICAE. In Mexico, the single was certified as gold for digital sales exceeding 30,000 copies. Thalía performed the song live at Cadena Dial Awards, that took place on March 13, 2013 in Tenerife, Spain.

"Te Perdiste Mi Amor", Thalía's duet with Prince Royce entered the US Billboard Latin Digital Songs chart at number 29 and peaked at number 19. The song was released worldwide in digital format on February 3, 2013 as the second single off the album. It peaked at No. 3 on the Latin pop chart, published by Billboard, while it reached the position No. 7 on the tropical songs chart and No. 4 on the hot Latin songs chart. Thalía and Prince Royce performed the song live in the 25th anniversary show of Lo Nuestro Awards, that took place in Miami, Florida on February 21, 2013.

The song Habitame Siempre was released as a promotional single in Mexico where it became the 70th most played song of 2013.

"La Apuesta", Thalia's collaboration with Erik Rubin was announced as the official third single off the album and will be released as a digital single on October 22, 2013. It will also function as the first promotional single for Thalia's upcoming live album, "VIVA! Tour en Vivo".

=== Tour ===
On February 25, 2013, Thalía announced that "The VIVA! Tour" will begin on March 24, 2013. Up to the moment, seven concerts have been officially announced, five of them in the United States and two in Mexico. Thalía stated that with this tour, she will have concerts in all over Latin America, while on March 13, 2013 she confirmed that she plans to expand the tour to some European cities.

== Critical response ==
Professional ratings
Review scores
Source	Rating
AARP	favorable
Allmusic	3.5/5 stars
Billboard	favorable
El País	favorable
Rhapsody	favorable
YAM Magazine	3.5/5 stars

Habítame siempre was well-received by music critics, who stated that Thalía surpassed all the expectations with this album and it is definitely considered one of the best albums in her career. Many critics pointed out that in Habítame Siempre, Thalía is enjoying an artistic peak, as she interprets most of the songs with an indescridable feeling, as if the intensity of the emotions that she's accumulated throughout her life have come pouring out in her latest music, and especially in her voice.

On this album, as well as on the previous one, Thalía focused on creating quality music that can bring out our better instincts, and she leaves no doubt as to why she is an international artist who's revered by her peers. Most critics also praised the production of the album, as the musicians who took part in the recording sessions are among the best in the music business, while the album was produced by some of the greatest and most recognized producers.Justino Águila of Billboard stated that "Thalía’s strong vocals, do particularly well in sweeping romantic ballads that showcase her chops and versatility", while he commented that "on this album, Thalía broke out from her trademark solo songs and sought more collaboration and duets, and the repertoire is very mature but still exciting".

Rachel Devitt of Rhapsody.com was also positive about the release, and she stated : "Thalía, once vivacious pop diva and now mid-career maven of pop, released an album with stately ballads, maturely mid-tempo tropical numbers and duets with a host of very respectable (and grownup) guests to match. The result? Well ... vivacious. She gets all soft-focus and limpid-eyed with a trio of other mid-career stars ("Con Los Años Que Me Quedan"), she salsas with Gilberto Santa Rosa ("Dime Si Ahora") and even gets her brassy classic crooner on with Michael Bublé. This is a lady who was made for a sobbing, throbbing "Bésame Mucho".

According to the YAM Magazine review, "Thalía has grown into her musical persona and fits perfectly into the album despite not being a powerhouse vocalist" and that "the album is familiar ground, never bordering on boredom and favoring the comfort (and the maturity) that comes with accepting who you are…". Furthermore, the reviewer went on to claim that in this album, Thalía "chose to not try to be hip and cool, staying as far away from dance music and electronic beats that has plagued the market worldwide", rating her with 3.5 out of 5 stars.

Alejandra Volpi from El País commented that Thalía reached to the most audacious moment of her career in the interpretation of the song "Hoy ten miedo de mi", while Ernesto Lechner from AARP published a favorable review for the album, stating that "no one can doubt Thalía's musical intelligence by incorporating various music styles and artists in this record, making her expressive and temperamental voice to bright even more". He also stated that in Habítame Siempre "it's like she's mixing the past and the present of Latin music, being this the reason it's her most complete and diverse album to date". Furthermore, Thom Jurek, a music critic in Allmusic also wrote a positive review on the album. He viewed "Habítame Siempre" as an "ambitious" release, rating it with 3.5 out of 5 stars and stating that "the album features a wide array of styles, and more than a few surprises [...] "Muñequita Linda" with Robbie Williams has a musical cabaret style that harks back to the 1940s [...] her reading of the ubiquitous "Bésame Mucho" with Michael Bublé, in both Spanish and English, weds classic pop to tango and nueva canción in a stunning arrangement".

== Commercial performance ==
Habítame Siempre debuted at number No. 1 on both Billboard's Top Latin and Latin Pop charts, becoming Thalía's fifth No. 1 album in the Billboard's Latin Pop albums chart and her third No. 1 in the Top Latin Albums chart. On December 2014, the album received a Gold certification by Recording Industry Association of America, for shipments of 50,000 units in the U.S. In Mexico, Habítame Siempre reached the top position, while AMPROFON certified the album 4-times Platinum and additional Gold certification as of 2022, which equals 217,000 units sold in the country.

In Argentina, the album debuted at number four in the country's official album chart, provided by CAPIF. In Spain, the album was released on February 5, 2013. It debuted at number 33 and peaked at No. 26 in the Spanish Albums Chart, published by PROMUSICAE. Habítame Siempre has sold an estimated half million copies worldwide.

== Track listing ==
Standard edition
No.	Title	Writer(s)	Producer(s)	Length
1.	"Habítame Siempre"	Mario Domm, Maria Bernal	Cheche Alara	4:01
2.	"Con Los Años Que Me Quedan" (featuring Leonel García, "Samo" and Jesús Navarro)	Gloria Estefan, Emilio Estefan Jr.	Walter Afanasieff, Cheche Alara	4:56
3.	"Manías"	Raúl Ornelas	Cheche Alara	3:49
4.	"Te Perdiste Mi Amor" (featuring Prince Royce)	Geoffrey Rojas, Guianko Gómez, Jorge Luis Chacín	Geoffrey Rojas, "Yanko" Gomez, Efraín "Junito" Dávila	3:40
5.	"No Soy el Aire"	Miguel Luna	Cheche Alara	4:06
6.	"Bésame Mucho" (featuring Michael Bublé)	Consuelo Velázquez	Humberto Gatica	3:39
7.	"Regalito de Dios"	Edgar Alfredo Zabaleta	Cheche Alara	3:12
8.	"Tómame o Déjame"	Juan Carlos Calderón	Cheche Alara	3:39
9.	"Muñequita Linda (Te Quiero Dijiste)" (featuring Robbie Williams)	María Grever	Cheche Alara	3:34
10.	"Bésame"	Ricardo Montaner, Chacín	Cheche Alara	4:36
11.	"Dime Si Ahora" (featuring Gilberto Santa Rosa)	Beatriz Luengo, Yotuel Romero, Ahmed Barroso	Cheche Alara	4:42
12.	"Ojalá"	Omar Alfanno, Andres Castro, Edgar Barrera	Cheche Alara	3:41
Total length:				47:52

Deluxe edition - bonus tracks
No.	Title	Writer(s)	Producer(s)	Length
13.	"La Apuesta" (featuring Erik Rubin)	Beatríz Herraiz	Armando Ávila	3:33
14.	"Hoy Ten Miedo de Mí"	Fernando Delgadillo	Cheche Alara	2:30
15.	"Atmósfera"	Silvio Donizeti Rodrigues, Guiliano Matheus	Armando Ávila	3:45
Total length:				56:48

Special edition - bonus tracks
No.	Title	Writer(s)	Length
16.	"Vete"	Leonel García, Thalía Sodi	3:20
17.	"Tu Amor"	Thalía Sodi	4:46
Total length:			1:04:54

Hammerstein Ballroom Concert DVD / Blu-ray track listing
No.	Title	Length
1.	"Equivocada"	4:03
2.	"Habítame Siempre"	5:22
3.	"Hits Medley: No Me Enseñaste (Remix)/ Tú y Yo/ Entre el Mar y una Estrella/ María la del Barrio"	5:45
4.	"Con Los Años Que Me Quedan" (duet with Leonel García, "Samo" and Jesús Navarro)	6:40
5.	"Besame"	3:35
6.	"Manías"	3:59
7.	"Primera Fila Medley: Cómo/ Enséñame a Vivir"	3:29
8.	"La Apuesta" (duet with Erik Rubin)	3:32
9.	"Tómame O Déjame"	4:25
10.	"Te Perdiste Mi Amor" (duet with Prince Royce)	4:19
11.	"Atmosfera"	2:40
Total length:		50:00

DVD/ Blu-ray: Extras
No.	Title	Director	Length
1.	"'Habítame Siempre' Detrás de Cámaras"	Frank Amadeo/ Jeb Brien	17:00
Total length:			17:00

Notes

- In iTunes, the album was released in both standard and bonus tracks editions.
- In Latin America, the album was released in the format of the bonus tracks edition.

== Personnel ==
Credits for the standard edition of Habítame Siempre in alphabetical order.

- Cristina Abaroa - Copista
- Walter Afanasieff - Arreglos, Bass, Drum Programming, Orchestral Arrangements, Piano, Producer, Vocal Producer
- Cheche Alara - Accordion, Arranger, Arreglos, Digital Editing, Engineer, Fender Rhodes, Keyboards, Organ (Hammond), Piano, Producer, String Arrangements, String Director, Vocal Director, Vocal Producer, Wurlitzer
- Rolando Alejandro - Vocal Engineer
- Omar Alfanno - Composer
- Graham Archer - Vocal Engineer
- Pablo Arraya - Vocal Engineer
- Armando Ávila - Mezcla
- Edgar Barrera - Composer
- Ahmed Barroso - Composer
- Alisha Bauer - Seccion De Cuerdas
- Francis Benítez - Coros
- Tal Bergman - Bateria, Percussion
- Maria Bernal - Composer
- Raúl Bier - Percussion
- Charlie Bisharat - Seccion De Cuerdas, Violin
- Michael Bublé - Featured Artist
- Rebecca Bunnell - Seccion De Cuerdas
- Jorge Calandrelli - Orchestral Arrangements
- Juan Carlos Calderón - Composer
- Andrés Castro - Composer
- Jorge Luis Chacin - Composer
- Steve Churchyard - Engineer
- Vinnie Colaiuta - Bateria
- Kevin Connolly - Seccion De Cuerdas
- Luis Conte - Percussion
- Randy Cooke - Bateria
- Jesus Cordero - Photography
- Efrain "Junito" Davila - Arreglos, Keyboards, Piano, Producer
- Isabel de Jesús - A&R
- Jean Michel Desir - Engineer
- Mario Domm - Composer
- Nathan East - Bass
- Emilio Estefan Jr. - Composer
- Jonathan Eugenio - Coros
- Nina Evtuhov - Seccion De Cuerdas
- Angel Fernandez - Arranger
- Paul Forat - Director, Producer, Vocal Director
- Vanessa Freebairn-Smith - Seccion De Cuerdas
- Francesc Freixes - Graphic Design
- G. M. Estefan - Composer
- Leonel García - Featured Artist, Vocal Director
- Humberto Gatica - Mezcla, Producer
- Guianko Gómez - Composer, Engineer, Producer
- Tyler Gordon - Pro-Tools
- Adam Greenholtz - Engineer
- María Grever - Composer
- Seth Atkins Horan - Engineer
- Camila Ibarra - Coros
- Eric Jorgensen - Trombone
- Peter Kent - Seccion De Cuerdas
- Randy Kerber - Keyboards
- Harry Kim - Arranger, Trumpet
- Abraham Laboriel Sr. - Bass
- Bob Ludwig - Mastering
- Beatríz Luengo - Composer
- Miguel Luna - Composer
- Rubén Martín - Photography
- Alfredo Matheus - Mezcla
- Christopher Mercedes - Bass
- Peter Mokran - Mezcla
- Ricardo Montaner - Composer
- Facundo Monty - Coros
- Nate Morton - Bateria
- Tommy Mottola - Executive Producer
- Carlos Murguía - Coros
- Jesus Navarro - Featured Artist, Vocal Director
- Mike Oddone - Assistant Engineer
- Raúl Ornelas - Composer
- Joel Pargman - Seccion De Cuerdas
- Tim Pierce - Guitar (Acoustic), Guitar (Electric)
- Carlitos Del Puerto - Bass (Acoustic)
- Michele Richards - Seccion De Cuerdas
- Gerardo Rivas - Coros
- Jerry Rivas - Coros
- Hector Ruben Rivera - Production Coordination
- Cristián Robles - Engineer, Mezcla
- Francisco Rodriguez - Assistant Engineer
- Geoffrey Rojas - Composer
- Yotuel Romero - Composer
- Prince Royce - Featured Artist, Producer
- Samo - Featured Artist, Vocal Director
- Michito Sánchez - Percussion
- Victor Sanchez - Digital Editing
- Gilberto Santa Rosa - Coros, Featured Artist
- Rafa Sardina - Engineer, mixer
- George Shelby - Saxophone
- Lee Sklar - Bass
- Joe Solda - Contratista
- Michelle Sotomayor - Coros
- Ramón Stagnaro - Guitar, Guitar (Acoustic), Guitar (Electric)
- Rudolph Stein - Seccion De Cuerdas
- Steven Cruz - Guitar
- Cameron Stone - Seccion De Cuerdas
- David Stout - String Arrangements
- Thalía - Primary Artist
- JoAnn Tominaga - Production Coordination
- Gisa Vatcky - Coros
- Christopher "Chapo" Vegazo - Guira
- Consuelo Velázquez - Composer
- Seth Waldmann - Assistant Engineer
- Robbie Williams - Featured Artist
- Hal Winer - Engineer
- John Wittenberg - Seccion De Cuerdas
- Edgar Alfredo Zabaleta - Composer
- Ayelen Zucker - Coros

== Charts ==
=== Weekly charts ===
Charts (2012-2013)	Peak position
Argentine Albums (CAPIF)	4
Mexican Albums (Top 100 Mexico)	1
Spanish Albums (PROMUSICAE)	26
US Billboard Top Latin Albums	1
US Billboard Latin Pop Albums	1

=== Year-end charts ===
Chart (2013)	Position
Mexico (Top 100 Mexico)	5
US Top Latin Albums	38
US Latin Pop Albums	10

== Certifications ==
Region	Certification	Certified units/sales
Mexico (AMPROFON)	4× Platinum+Gold	270,000^{‡}
United States (RIAA)	Gold (Latin)	50,000^{^}
Venezuela	Platinum	
Summaries
Worldwide	—	500,000
^{^} Shipments figures based on certification alone.^{‡} Sales+streaming figures based on certification alone.

== Release history ==
Country	Date	Format(s)	Edition(s)
Worldwide	November 19, 2012	Digital download	Standard, Deluxe
Mexico	November 16, 2012	Compact disc	Deluxe
Argentina	November 16, 2012	Compact disc	Standard, Deluxe
United States	November 19, 2012	Compact disc	Standard, Target Edition
Latin America	November 29, 2012	Compact disc	Deluxe
Japan	December 4, 2012	Compact disc	Standard
Brazil	December 21, 2012	Compact disc	Standard
Spain	February 5, 2013	Compact disc	Deluxe
Greece	May 14, 2013	Compact disc	Standard
