= Un Hombre Normal =

Single by Espinoza Paz

from the album Un Hombre Normal
- Released: January 2012
- Recorded: 2011
- Genre: Ballad
- Length: 4:15
- Label: Disa Records
- Songwriter: Espinoza Paz

"Un Hombre Normal" (A Normal Man) is a song recorded by Mexican singer Espinoza Paz, released as a single from his album of the same title. The song became his fourth top 5 hit on the Billboard Latin Songs chart, and the third to peak at No.4, after "Al Diablo Lo Nuestro" (2010) and "El Culpable" (2011). "Un Hombre Normal" was nominated for a Pop Song of the Year at the Premio Lo Nuestro 2013.

== Trackslisting ==
- Album version
1. "Un Hombre Normal" — 4:15

== Charts ==
=== Weekly charts ===
Chart (2012)	Peak position
Mexico (Billboard International)	3
US Hot Latin Songs (Billboard)	4
US Regional Mexican Airplay (Billboard)	1

=== Year-end charts ===
Chart (2012)	Position
US Hot Latin Songs (Billboard)	8

== See also ==
- List of number-one songs of 2012 (Mexico)
