= El Canta Autor del Pueblo =

Studio album by Espinoza Paz
- Released: 18 March 2008
- Genre: Regional Mexican
- Label: American Show Latin/Machete Regio

Espinoza Paz chronology
El Canta Autor del Pueblo (2008)	Yo No Canto, Pero Lo Intentamos (2009)

El Canta Autor del Pueblo (The People's Singer-Songwriter) is the first studio album by regional Mexican artist Espinoza Paz. It was released on 18 March 2008, by American Show Latin/Machete Regio.

== Background ==
Before Paz signed a deal with the major label Universal Latino, he released the album Amigo con Derechos in 2008, on a small independent label. Several of the tracks from that album are included on his major label debut El Canta Autor Del Pueblo including "Carcacha Vieja" (Retitled "La Carcacha"), "Amigo con Derechos", "Asi Soy Feliz", "El Celular", "El Bobo" (Retitled "No Soy Un Bobo"), "Un Numero Mas" (Retitled "Ojala"), "Tus Ojos Lindos" (Retitled "Madre Mia") and "La Que Sufre Es Mi Mama".

== Track listing ==
1. Amigos Con Derechos
2. Así Soy Feliz
3. Madre Mía
4. El Celular
5. La Carcacha
6. No Soy Un Bobo
7. La Que Sufre Es Mi Mama
8. Ojala
9. El Próximo Viernes
10. La Sorpresa
11. Gotitas De Lluvia
12. Por Cuanto Me Amarías
13. El Celular (Version Tololoche) US Bonus Track
14. Amigos Con Derecho (Version Tololoche) US Bonus Track
15. Ojala (Version Tololoche) US Bonus Track

== Charts ==
=== Weekly charts ===
Chart (2008–2009)	Peak position
US Heatseekers Albums (Billboard)	17
US Top Latin Albums (Billboard)	11
US Regional Mexican Albums (Billboard)	5

=== Year-end charts ===
Chart (2009)	Position
US Top Latin Albums (Billboard)	18

== Sales and certifications ==
Region	Certification	Certified units/sales
United States (RIAA)	Platinum (Latin)	100,000^{^}
^{^} Shipments figures based on certification alone.
