= Espinoza Paz =

Mexican musician and composer

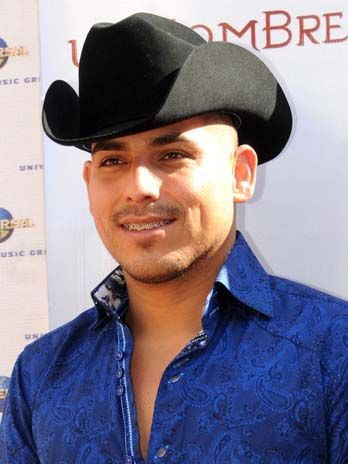
- Paz in 2012

Background information
- Born: Isidro Chávez Espinoza; 29 October 1981 (age 44); Angostura, Sinaloa, Mexico
- Genres: Sinaloan banda, mariachi, norteño, norteño with sax, duranguense, country en Español
- Instruments: Vocals, guitar
- Years active: 2004–present
- Labels: Universal Music Group (2004–2011); Viernes Music (2011–present)
- Website: www.espinozapaz.com

Isidro Chávez Espinoza (born 29 October 1981), better known as Espinoza Paz, is a Latin Grammy nominated Mexican musician and songwriter of regional Mexican music.

== Early career ==
Espinoza Paz (Isidro Chávez Espinoza) was born on 29 October 1981 in La Angostura, a small town in the north of the state of Sinaloa, Mexico. He was 11 years old when he wrote his first song, which was dedicated to a girl on whom he had a crush. By the time he was 13, he had already written 20 songs; however, it was not until his father sent him money from the United States that he decided to buy his first guitar and teach himself to play it.

== Success ==
His big break came when he showed some of his creations to El Coyote—a popular Sinaloan banda singer—who recorded his songs "Besitos En El Cuello" ("Little Kisses On The Neck"); "Prohibido" ("Forbidden"); and "Para Impresionarte" ("To Impress You").

In December 2006, Paz met Martín Fabian, a well-known personality within the radio and music industry, who immediately foresaw the extraordinary talent within the young singer-songwriter. They soon began collaborating on his debut album "Paz En Tu Corazón" (literally, "Peace In Your Heart"—the title being a wordplay on his name). This project was released in 2007 in association with Nueva Generacion Music Group. Another independently released album, "Amigo Con Derechos" ("Friend With Benefits"), followed in 2008 a recording contract with the major label Universal Latino, which released his first major label album "El Canta Autor del Pueblo" ("The Village Singer-Songwriter") in 2008 on its Machete Music subsidiary. This album featured eight previously released favorites such as "El Celular" ("The Cell Phone") and "Amigo con Derechos" ("Friend With Benefits") plus four new recordings. The single from this album, "El Proximo Viernes" ("Next Friday") reached No. 14 on Billboard Magazine's "Hot Latin Tracks" chart.

Soon, Paz was penning songs for a long list of regional Regional artists, including Sergio Vega, La Arrolladora Banda El Limón, Banda Cuisillos, Julio Chaidez, Banda Jerez, Jenni Rivera, Chuy Lizarraga, Adair Elizalde, El Potro de Sinaloa, Calibre 50, Montéz de Durango, Julión Álvarez, El Chapo de Sinaloa, and Duelo, among numerous others.

In 2010, he released the album "Del Rancho Para El Mundo" which included the smash hit "Al Diablo Lo Nuestro". The album was nominated for a Latin Grammy Award and was certified Gold. In 2011, he released another Gold selling album: "Canciones Que Duelen". This album debuted at #1 on the Billboard Latin Albums Chart and included the hit single "Para No Perderte". The album was also released in a deluxe version with a DVD containing several live performances.

In 2012, he released "Un Hombre Normal", a compilation album featuring some of his biggest hits, remixes and several new recordings. The title track would eventually reach No. 1 on the Latin Charts. During this time, Paz decided to release an album of all Mariachi songs with the group Mariachi Sol de Mexico. The album which was originally titled "Las Facturas del Destino" was re-titled and was not released until 2016.

In the 2020s, Paz has performed theme songs of Mexican telenovelas: "Mi Venganza" for La desalmada (2021), and "La Esperanza" for Tierra de esperanza (2023).

== Brief Retirement ==
In 2012, Paz shocked fans by saying he was going to retire, after a lawsuit from his former manager. In early 2014, he switched labels from "Nueva Generacion Music Group" to "Anval Music". During this time, Paz's popularity began to decline and although he released numerous singles, he did not release another studio album until 2016.

== Discography ==
=== Studio albums ===
List of studio albums, with selected chart positions and certifications
| Title | Album details | Peak chart positions | | | | Certifications |
| Title | Album details | US | US Top Latin | US Reg Mexican | MEX | Certifications |
|---|---|---|---|---|---|---|
| Mi Pasado En Mi Presente | Released: June 20, 2004; Label: Junio Discos | — | — | — | — | |
| Prohibido Perder | Released: January 1, 2005; Label: Universal Music Mexico; Formats: CD, Digital download | — | — | — | — | |
| El Canta Autor del Pueblo | Released: March 18, 2008; Label: American Show Latin / Machete Regio; Formats: CD, Digital download | — | 11 | 5 | 63 | RIAA: Platinum (Latin) |
| Yo No Canto, Pero lo Intentamos | Released: January 26, 2009; Label: Universal Music, Disa Records; Formats: CD, Digital download | 116 | 1 | 1 | 34 | RIAA: Platinum (Latin) |
| Mis Canciones con Amor | Released: April 30, 2010; Label: M Gen Stream Inc. | — | 30 | 15 | — | |
| Del Rancho Para el Mundo | Released: August 10, 2010; Label: Universal Music, Disa Records; Formats: CD, Digital download | 66 | 2 | 1 | 18 | RIAA: Gold (Latin) |
| Canciones Que Duelen | Released: September 27, 2011; Label: Universal Music, Disa Records; Formats: CD, Digital download | 121 | 1 | 1 | 1 | RIAA: Gold (Latin) |
| Un Hombre Normal | Released: January 19, 2012; Label: Universal Music, Disa Records; Formats: CD, Digital download | 167 | 2 | 1 | — | |
| Enamorado del Pueblo | Released: March 20, 2012; Label: Platino Records | — | — | — | — | |
| Para Mi Ex | Released: March 11, 2016; Label: Viernes Music; Formats: Digital download | — | — | — | — | |
| No Pongan Esas Canciones | Released: June 3, 2016; Label: Viernes Music | — | 4 | 1 | — | |
| Las Compuse Para Ti | Released: February 14, 2018; Label: Viernes Music | — | — | — | — | |
| A Veces | Released: May 28, 2018; Label: Viernes Music | — | 10 | 2 | — | |
| Literalmente | Released: August 17, 2018; Label: Viernes Music | — | — | — | — | |
| Mujer | Released: December 17, 2018; Label: Viernes Music | — | — | — | — | |
| Hombre Normal, Vol. 2 | Released: January 8, 2019; Label: Viernes Music | — | — | — | — | |
| Hombre | Released: February 14, 2019; Label: Viernes Music | — | — | — | — | |
| Que No Se Caiga el Ritmo | Released: November 6, 2019; Label: Viernes Music | — | — | — | — | |

=== Compilations ===
| Title | Album details | Peak chart positions | | Certifications |
| Title | Album details | US Top Latin | MEX | Certifications |
|---|---|---|---|---|
| Mis Éxitos con Tololoche | Released: October 7, 2008; Label: Disa Records; Formats: CD | 58 | 34 | RIAA: Gold (Latin) |
| 15 Top Hits con el Canta Autor del Pueblo | Released: 2011; Label: Disa Records | — | 63 | |
| 16 Éxitos de Oro | Released: 2012 | — | — | |

== Collaborations ==
| Title | Year | Other artist(s) |
|---|---|---|
| "Espero" | 2009 | Montéz de Durango |
| "No Llega el Olvido" | 2010 | Jenni Rivera |
| "24 Horas" | 2010 | David Bisbal |
| "Te La Pasas" | 2011 | Tito Torbellino |
| "Asi O Mas" | 2012 | María José |
| "Me Voy" | 2012 | Paulina Rubio |
| "Siempre en Mi Mente" | 2012 | Juan Gabriel |
| "Te Pudiera Decir" | 2013 | Gerardo Ortiz |
| "Eres la Persona Correcta" | 2014 | Río Roma and Luis Coronel |
| "Sin Esencia" | 2015 | Nartoomid |
| "Llévame" | 2017 | Freddo |
| "Tan Enamorados" | 2017 | Ricardo Montaner |
| "Como Una Pelota" | 2017 | Jhonny Rivera |
| "Tiene Razón la Lógica" | 2019 | La Arrolladora Banda El Limón |
| "Como Duele Equivocarse" | 2020 | Carín León |
| "Yo No Dije" | 2026 | La Fiera de Ojinaga |
| "Soñé Que Volvías" | 2026 | Pedro Fernández |

== Television ==
- 2010: Los Heroes Del Norte Participacion
- 2010: La Academia Bicentenario Godfather of Generation
- 2010: Mi Amor Por Teresa Soto...Loco Enamorado
- 2011: La Voz... México (Himself / Judge)
- 2012: La Voz... México(Lift of Jenni Rivera)
- 2015: Me Pongo De Pie... Judge
- 2016: Compadres (Waldo)
- 2018: Hijas de la luna (Himself)
- 2019: La Voz Kids
- 2021: La desalmada (Himself)

== See also ==
- List of awards and nominations received by Espinoza Paz
