= La Apuesta =

Single by Thalía featuring Erik Rubin

from the album Viva Tour
- Released: October 22, 2013
- Recorded: 2012 (album version); 2013 (live version)
- Genre: Latin pop
- Length: 3:35
- Label: Sony Music
- Songwriter: Beatríz Herraiz
- Producer: Armando Ávila

Thalía singles chronology
"Te Perdiste Mi Amor" (2013)	"La Apuesta" (2013)	"Estou Apaixonado" (2014)

"La Apuesta" (The Bet) is a Latin pop song recorded originally in 2002 by the Spanish singer Rosa López in duet with Manu Tenorio for her first album. In 2012, it was recorded by Mexican artist Thalía featuring Erik Rubin and included in Thalía's eleventh studio album Habítame Siempre as well as the 2013 live album Viva Tour. The song was written by Beatríz Herraiz and produced by Armando Ávila. It was released on October 22, 2013 as the first single off the live album VIVA Tour. The single is a live version of the song recorded at the National Auditorium on April 26, 2013.

== Music and lyrics ==
The lyrics are written by Beatríz Herraiz while the song is about a bet a guy made with his friends that he would date a certain girl, with whom he falls in love without expecting it. Thalía stated in the documentary included on the special re-edition of the album that the song is partially true, since she really had an affair with Erik Rubin when they were members of the same pop music group (Timbiriche) back in the 80s. Thalía has also described it as a ‘nostalgic song’ that brings her many memories from her teen years. Thalia had written in the booklet of Habitame Siempre the following words about the song : "Nostalgia, magia, complicidad, hermandad. Y que el mundo gire y gire!" ("Nostalgy, magic, complicity, brotherhood. And may the world go round and round!"). The track is produced by Armando Ávila.

== Cover ==
The artwork of the cover of the single was revealed through the site of Amazon on October 14, 2013 and was officially confirmed by both Thalía and Erik Rubin. It shows the two artists performing the song live and it is an excerpt from their performance at the National Auditorium on April 26, 2013 which was recorded in front of an audience consisting of more than 10,000 people.

== Promotion ==
=== Live performances ===
The song was performed by Thalía and Erik Rubin for the first time on September 21, 2012 at the Hammerstein Ballroom in New York City. They also performed the song live in both Thalía's concerts at the National Auditorium of Mexico, on April 26 and 27 respectively. Thalía's concerts in Mexico were recorded and released on November 12, 2013 as a live CD/DVD Viva Tour. The song "La Apuesta" was chosen to be the first promotional single from this live album, while at the same time it functions as the third official single from the album Habítame Siempre. The song was sent to radios on October 14, 2013 and released as a digital single on October 22, 2013.

=== Music video ===
A music video of the song was released on September 13 and includes a live performance of the song at the Hammerstein Ballroom in New York. Some days later, it was announced that the official music video will be released on October 29, 2013 and it will most probably include the live performance of the song at the National Auditorium.

== Charts ==
Chart (2013)	Peak position
Mexico (Billboard Espanol Airplay)	20
Mexico (Monitor Latino)	11
Mexico Pop (Monitor Latino)	4

== Certifications ==
Region	Certification	Certified units/sales
Mexico (AMPROFON)	Gold	30,000^{*}
^{*} Sales figures based on certification alone.

== Release history ==
Region	Date	Format
Worldwide	October 22, 2013	Digital download
United States	October 15, 2013	Spanish Contemporary airplay
United States	October 15, 2013	Latin Urban

== Credits and personnel ==
- Interpreters – Thalía, Erik Rubin
- Producer – Armando Ávila
- Production coordinator – Armando Ávila
- Recording engineer – Armando Ávila, Francisco Rodriguez, Juan Carlos Moquel
- Voice engineer – Ignacio Seguro, Rotger Rosas
- Arrangements – Armando Ávila
- Mixed by – Armando Ávila
- (P) 2012 Sony Music Entertainment US Latin LLC
- (P) 2013 ATV Discos Music Publishing LLC (ASCAP)
