= Estoy Enamorado (Donato & Estéfano song) =

"Estoy enamorado"

Single by Thalía featuring Pedro Capó

from the album Primera fila
- Released: 9 July 2010
- Recorded: 30 July 2009 in Miami, Florida
- Genre: Acoustic music, Latin pop
- Length: 4:39
- Label: Sony Music
- Songwriters: Donato Poveda, Alfonso Salgado
- Producer: Áureo Baqueiro

Thalía singles chronology
"Qué será de ti" (2010)	"Estoy enamorado" (2010)	"Enséñame a vivir" (2010)

"Estoy Enamorado" (English: I'm in Love) is a song originally recorded in Spanish by the Cuban-Colombian duo Donato & Estefano for their 1995 Mar y Adentro album.

Both the original song and its "Estou Apaixonado" version were major hits in Brazil, having been extensively played as a romantic theme for TV Globo's 1995-1996 prime-time telenovela "Explode Coração".

== 1996 João Paulo & Daniel version ==
In 1996, the sertanejo duo João Paulo & Daniel released the album João Paulo & Daniel Vol. 7. The CD brought "Estou Apaixonado" in Brazilian Portuguese, becoming the duo's most successful hit, and rendering it a double platinum certification for more than 500 thousand copies sold.

== 2009 Thalía version ==
In 2009, Mexican singer Thalía released a version of the song in her live album Primera fila, featuring Puerto Rican musician Pedro Capó. "Estoy Enamorado" was released as third official single in the United States, Mexico, and Puerto Rico, while in Argentina, Spain, and Europe, it was released as "Enséñame a vivir".

== 2013 Thalía and Daniel version ==
In 2013, Thalía released an eponymous Portuguese-language album, and Daniel joined her for a relaunch of his "Estou Apaixonado" version. The song served as the lead single for this album and topped the Mexican singles charts, making it Thalía's third consecutive hit in her country, but had moderate airplay success in Brazil. This version was also included in Daniel's 2014 EP 30 Anos - O Musical.

"Estou Apaixonado"

Single by Thalía featuring Daniel

from the album Thalía
- Released: 14 March 2014
- Recorded: 2013
- Genre: Acoustic music, Latin pop
- Length: 4:39
- Label: Sony Music
- Songwriters: Donato Poveda, Alfonso Salgado
- Producer: Áureo Baqueiro

Thalía singles chronology
"La Apuesta" (2013)	"Estou Apaixonado" (2014)	"Vamos A Jugar" (2014)

== Charts ==
=== Weekly charts ===
Chart (2010)	Peak position
Brazil (Brasil Hot 100 Airplay) (Portuguese Version "Estou Apaixonado")	14
Mexico (Monitor Latino)	1
US Hot Latin Songs (Billboard)	28
US Latin Pop Airplay (Billboard)	6

=== Year-end charts ===
Chart (2010)	Position
Mexico (Monitor Latino)	28

== Certifications and sales ==
Region	Certification	Certified units/sales
Mexico (AMPROFON)	Platinum	60,000^{*}
^{*} Sales figures based on certification alone.
