= Yo No Canto, Pero lo Intentamos =

Yo No Canto, Pero Lo Intentamos

Studio album by Espinoza Paz
- Released: January 26, 2009
- Genre: Banda, Latin pop
- Label: Disa

Espinoza Paz chronology
El Canta Autor Del Pueblo (2008)	Yo No Canto, Pero Lo Intentamos (2009)	Del Rancho Para el Mundo (2010)

Yo No Canto, Pero lo Intentamos (I Don't Sing, But We Tried) is the second studio album by regional Mexican recording artist Espinoza Paz. It was released on January 26, 2009, by Disa Records.

== Track listing ==
All songs were composed by Espinoza Paz.

1. Odio Explotar - 2:59
2. Volveré Muy Pronto - 2:54
3. Lo Intentamos - 3:17
4. Cómo Me Das Lástima - 2:48
5. La Lagartija - 3:26
6. Resfriado - 3:44
7. En Cada Mujer - 2:55
8. Señorita Presumida - 2:36
9. Ponte en Mi Lugar - 3:23
10. Madrecita Santa - 2:31

Deluxe Collector's Edition Bonus Tracks
No.	Title	Length
11.	"Lo Intentamos (Versión Acustica)"
12.	"Lo Intentamos (Versión Balada Pop)"
13.	"Esclavo de Sus Besos (A Duo con David Bisbal)"

== Charts ==
=== Weekly charts ===
Chart (2009)	Peak position
Mexican Albums (Top 100 Mexico)	44
US Billboard 200	116
US Top Latin Albums (Billboard)	1
US Regional Mexican Albums (Billboard)	1

=== Year-end charts ===
Chart (2009)	Position
US Top Latin Albums (Billboard)	21
Chart (2010)	Position
US Top Latin Albums (Billboard)	22

== Sales and certifications ==
Region	Certification	Certified units/sales
United States (RIAA)	Platinum (Latin)	100,000^{^}
^{^} Shipments figures based on certification alone.

== See also ==
- List of number-one Billboard Top Latin Albums of 2009
