= Qué será de ti =

Song made famous by Roberto Carlos

"Como Vai Você"

Song by Roberto Carlos

from the album Roberto Carlos '72
- Recorded: 1972
- Genre: Latin pop
- Songwriters: Antonio Marcos, Mario Marcos

"Como Vai Você" (English: 'How are you [doing]'; , in Spanish: "Qué será de ti", English: 'What went on with you') is a song made famous by Brazilian singer Roberto Carlos from his album Roberto Carlos (1972).

== Melina León version ==
"Qué será de ti (Como vai você)"

Single by Melina León

from the album Corazón de Mujer
- Released: November 2001
- Genre: Latin
- Length: 3:53
- Label: Sony Discos
- Songwriters: Antonio Marcos, Mario Marcos
- Producers: Alejandro Jaen, Ismael Rosario

Melina León singles chronology
| "Corazón de Mujer" (2001) | "Qué será de ti (Como vai você)" (2001) | "Un Hombre de Verdad" (2002) |

In 2001 Puerto Rican singer Melina León covered the song on her album Corazón de Mujer. Her version of the song was included on the soundtrack for El Clon.

=== Charts ===
| Chart (2002) | Position |
|---|---|
| US Hot Latin Songs (Billboard) | 29 |
| US Latin Pop Airplay (Billboard) | 13 |

== Thalía version ==
"Qué será de ti (Como vai você)"

Single by Thalía

from the album Primera Fila
- Released: January 15, 2010
- Recorded: Miami, Florida, July 30, 2009
- Genre: Acoustic music, Latin pop
- Length: 4:37
- Label: Sony Music
- Songwriters: Antonio Marcos, Mario Marcos
- Producer: Áureo Baqueiro

Thalía singles chronology
| "Equivocada" (2009) | "Qué será de ti (Como vai você)" (2010) | "Estoy enamorado" (2010) |

In 2009, Mexican singer Thalía covered the song on her live album Primera fila which was released as the second single from the album.

=== Live performances ===
Thalía performed the song together with a medley of her hits ("Entre el mar y una estrella" and "Amor a la Mexicana") at "Premio Lo Nuestro 2010" awards in which she was honored with "Jóvenes con Legado" award (Young Artist Legacy Award ). Thalía took the award from Gloria Estefan's hands making this honor one of the greatest. "Premio Lo Nuestro 2010" awards honored Thalía for her achievements in the music industry through all these years as she managed to establish her name internationally.

Thalía also performed the song together with Equivocada at Mexican shows "Hoy" and "Adela Micha".

=== Official versions ===
1. Qué será de ti (Live Album Version)
2. Qué será de ti (Banda Version)

=== Weekly charts ===
The song was successful as its predecessor Equivocada, reaching the number 2 spot in the Mexican Singles Chart behind Camila's Aléjate de mí.

| Chart (2010) | Peak position |
|---|---|
| Mexico (Monitor Latino) | 2 |
| US Hot Latin Songs (Billboard) | 35 |
| US Latin Pop Airplay (Billboard) | 13 |

=== Year-end charts ===
| Chart (2010) | Position |
|---|---|
| Mexico (Monitor Latino) | 9 |

=== Certifications and sales ===
| Region | Certification | Certified units/sales |
|---|---|---|
| Mexico (AMPROFON) | Platinum | 60,000^{*} |
^{*} Sales figures based on certification alone.

== Other Versions ==
- (Chile) Luis Jara, from his studio album Swing (released on 2009).
