= Tito Torbellino =

American singer and songwriter (1981–2014)

- Born: Tomás Eduardo Tovar Rascón; May 24, 1981; Phoenix, Arizona, U.S.
- Origin: Ciudad Obregón, Sonora, Mexico
- Died: May 29, 2014 (aged 33) Ciudad Obregón, Sonora, Mexico
- Cause of death: Assassination (gunshot wounds)
- Genre: Regional Mexican
- Occupations: Singer, songwriter
- Years active: 2002–2014
- Spouse: Valeria Lara Rojas

Tomás Eduardo Tovar Rascón (May 24, 1981 – May 29, 2014), also known as Tito Torbellino, was a Mexican-American singer and songwriter known for his work with the regional Mexican music genre. He was from Phoenix, Arizona, but performed throughout the southwestern United States and Northern Mexico.

Tovar was murdered as he dined at El Red Restaurant in Ciudad Obregón, Mexico, on May 29, 2014, five days after his 33rd birthday.

== See also ==
- List of unsolved murders (2000–present)
