= Primera Fila (Thalía album) =

Live album by Thalía
- Released: December 1, 2009
- Recorded: July 29–30, 2009
- Venues: Miami, Florida
- Genres: Acoustic, Latin pop
- Length: 56:40 (CD); 65:22 (DVD concert); 11:24 (DVD documentary)
- Label: Sony Music Latin
- Producers: Áureo Baqueiro, Tommy Mottola

Thalía chronology
Lunada (2008)	Primera Fila (2009)	Habítame Siempre (2012)

Singles from Primera Fila
- 1. "Equivocada" Released: October 7, 2009; 2. "Qué será de ti" Released: January 15, 2010; 3. "Con la Duda" Released: April 25, 2010; 4. "Estoy enamorado" Released: July 9, 2010; 5. "Enséñame a vivir" Released: August 3, 2010; 6. "El Próximo Viernes" Released: November 19, 2010

Primera Fila (English: Front Row) is the first live album by Mexican singer-songwriter Thalía. The album was recorded in Miami, Florida at the BankUnited Center on July 29 and 30, 2009, with a selected audience to attend the concert. Primera Fila is Thalia's first project under the Sony Music label.

The album was released on 1 December 2009 in the United States and Latin America; in Europe and Asia it was released in April 2010. It includes duets with multi Grammy Award-winning Mexican singer and songwriter Joan Sebastian and the Puerto Rican musician Pedro Capó. It comprises mostly new songs but also includes a medley of four of her hits.

Primera Fila reached sales close to 1 million, and it is ranked among the best-selling albums in Mexico. It spent 55 non-consecutive weeks at the top of Mexican charts.

== Background ==
Thalía ended her contract with EMI Music in 2009, some months after the release of her album Lunada, because of the album's very low sales in comparison with her previous successful releases. In the meantime, Thalía had to recover from Lyme disease, a disease that put her health into serious danger. As a matter of fact, a big part of the press in her native Mexico mentioned that she would have to retire from music, at least until fully recovered. During that period, Thalía was not contracted to any record label; she had been completely devoted to her business activities and her radio program.

Finally, she signed a contract with Sony Music Entertainment and in July 2009, it was announced that she would record an album in acoustic format as her first official release under her new label, Sony Music Latin.

== Development ==
=== Preparation ===
This album is the biggest decision in my whole life, because it broke many of my fears and many of the limits I had set for myself. I wanted my audience to view me exactly as I am, to take off those masks that suddenly a human being wears in order to not be considered as vulnerable, fragile or sensible by the others. So, allowing myself to express what I have inside was an experience that made me grow as a person and as an artist. What's more, focusing on simply interpreting the songs and not considering the choreography or the wardrobe, taught me a big lesson as an artist.

— Thalía's statements regarding Primera Fila.

During an interview in Argentina, Thalía commented that she was preparing for six months in order to sing in a "new and fresh manner". In a 2010 interview, she confessed that during the last two years she reflected some traces of her that were obsolete and that converted her into a woman who accepts what she is, while she went on to express that she did not feel prepared in personal level, and that the album wouldn't have been the same if it was record in any previous moment in her life.

Paul Forat, vice president of Sony Music Latin, the person who had the idea of creating this project, stated that he always felt it would be fair for the audience and the mass media to see further than Thalía's celebrity substance and discover the "artist" in her. He went on to claim that "Thalía has an incredible voice and in that point of her artistic career, it was the right time for her to interpret with the intensity needed for these great songs. That's what Primera Fila was about".

In Primera Fila, Thalía composed two songs along with Leonel García (former member of the band Sin Bandera). According to Thalía herself, they needed one year and two months to choose the songs and discuss with various producers and songwriters.

=== Recording process ===
The album was recorded at the BankUnited Center in the University of Miami, Florida, in July 2009, with Thalía being accompanied to twelve musicians, and before a selected audience of approximately 300 guests. Before beginning to sing, Thalía expressed with a low and fragile voice and tears that she wanted to return to singing like the little girl she once was, the one that sang openly and honestly in front of her mirror. The private concert lasted about two hours and it costed more than 1 million $US, according to Billboard, which is an extraordinary cost for Spanish-language recording productions. During the performance, Thalía was wearing cowboy trousers and a plain white blouse, without making any wardrobe changes. The closing of the recital was with the song «Mujeres», written by Ricardo Arjona. Her final words were : «I missed the stage...I missed the microphones, thank you for coming and all this is exclusively for you».

Christian Pedraza from Ritmoson Latino described the concert as "a romantic and multifaceted acoustic concert", while he stated that "Thalía definitely left behind her all those outlandish hairstyles and eccentric wardrobe that had stigmatised her in the previous years». The same opinion was shared by various mass media, that pointed out an absolute change in Thalía's artistic personam as far as appearance is concerned. Thalía's husband, Tommy Mottola commented : "You previously knew Thalía the popular icon, now you will learn Thalía the artist". Generally, diverse mass media coincided that both the production and the new look marked a "before and after" in Thalía's career. Regarding to this issue, Thalía stated that there were three reasons for this change, "her maternity, her health problems, and a natural maturation in her spiritual life".

=== Album concept ===
Primera Fila is a "concept" strategy created by Sony Music Latin and initially aiming to present some of the top Latin artists while directly recording their music material before a small number of attendants. This "unplugged" format that would present artists in their most intimate and personal performance was the main concept of Primera Fila. Thalía was the second artist to record a Primera Fila album, after her Vicente Fernandez, and her album was the most successful in comparison to all the other releases that followed in the same series. The concept of the album is reasonably compared to the MTV Unplugged series, created by MTV Networks.Guillermo Gutiérrez, vicepresident of Sony Music, assured that «the intention is not to imitate MTV Unplugged but the process in indeed similar.[...] The production team of the artist is encharged of the cost and the audience has free access to the show». Both Warner and Sony Music have assured that «these recordings are not a manner of facing the crisis of the music industry but an escape to offering new music projects».

== Critical response ==
Professional ratings
Review scores
Source	Rating
Allmusic	4.5/5 stars
Billboard	favorable
El Universal	favorable
Enelshow.com	4/5 stars
Houston Chronicle	mixed
The San Diego Tribune	favorable
Univision	favorable

Primera Fila was well received. Jason Birchmeier from Allmusic gave the album an extraordinary 4.5 out of 5 stars, naming the album as the "most surprising album Thalía has released in her whole career". James Christopher Monger from the same site, praised the production team, stating that "the album is one of the best produced, being it an accomplishment for a Spanish-language release". In the Amazon.com review, the album was described as "intimate, magic and unforgettable". Sigal Ratner from The San Diego Tribune congratulated Thalía for her interpretation and expressed the opinion that [Primera fila] «manages to offer one of the most mature performances that she has offered in her whole career». Sandra Mendoza Ortíz from Univision commented that with this album "she actually proved the fact that she can sing to those who would never believe it". Angelica Gisel Mora from American Online described the album as "the most innovative release in her singing career", while Russell Rúa from the Puerto Rican tabloid Primera Hora commented : "It's almost always that she uses playback in her TV performances, and she has never offered a concert in Puerto Rico. That's why, during her two decades in music as a solo artist, many people questioned or doubted about the talent or the vocal abilities of this physically gorgeous Mexican woman. The majority thought that Thalía was simply a product that gained popularity mostly because of her successful telenovelas back in the 90s. After many years, the answer finally came.[...] The result: spectacular. The artist unleashed her voice like never before, with honesty and potency, distanced from the choreographies and the glitter stuff that used to accompany her".

Michael Quaid from Enelshow.com rated the album with 4 out of 5 stars, commenting that he believes Thalía has always had the virtue of possessing one of the greatest voices in the Latin music panorama. Edwin P. Iturbide from Emet magazine stated : «[...] when you listen to her, when you watch her, you shall feel what she desires to transmit with her voice, and that is simplicity, pure talent, and smooth emotions to returning to the singer, the artist she used to be; in a stage with a few musicians and without the fear of the millions of people expecting to listen and watch: plain, great, reigning, magnificent, clear, fragile, simply herself». Daniel Kemich Reyes Hernández from the same magazine commented that «Thalia, apart from being a marketing product that had small periods of success either because of fashion, of time or because of the commerciality of the music genre (pop), can still prove through this production that her voice has matured and her repertoire as well». David Dorantes from the Houston Chronicle in a mixed review commented : «Primera fila is a well produced album, but falls short as an acoustic work, in comparison with other icons of Latin pop, like Julieta Venegas for example.[...] The arrangements are not interesting enough and remain common in pop music». Finally, Álex Madrigal from El Universal said that «Thalía stayed away from the meaningless and empty pop songs and focused on converting herself into an interpreter with a fresh and new artistic substance».

Responding to the reviews, Thalía stated : «Those who criticised my music and categorized me as a "product of marketing" now send me e-mails to tell me that they felt emotioned with this album. It's the best award I have been given in my life and it makes me feel proud of myself». In the documentary Las muchas vidas de Thalía (The many lives of Thalía), she states that : «the glamour image that I had incorporated in my career and the comments surrounding me, functioned as reason enough for my artistic and interpreting abilities to be judged and doubted». Finally, she went on to admit that she didn't feel a victim, because in many cases she didn't do anything to detain what was being told and in other cases, she was even feeding those comments herself.

== Commercial performance ==
According to different reports, including from Billboard, estimated sales stand between 1 and 1.5 million copies. In 2010, media reported sales outside of Mexico between 300,000 internationally and 500,000 in Latin America alone.

In the United States, the album peaked at only number 198 on the Billboard 200. However, it debuted within the top five in both the Top Latin and Latin Pop album charts, published by Billboard. Primera Fila sold 96,000 units as of 2011 in the U.S. according to Nielsen SoundScan, while other media estimated U.S. sales at 250,000.

The album achieved immediately success in Mexico, debuting at top of the country's national chart, and retaining the position for 55 non-consecutive weeks. The album spent over 170 weeks on the Mexican charts by April 2013. Primera Fila achieved a Diamond certification by AMPROFON in 2012, and crossed the half-million copies sold in Mexico by that time. As of 2020, the album received a 2x Diamond and additional Platinum award in Mexico, signifying 660,000 equivalent-units.

In Argentina, the album peaked at number 7 on the monthly chart provided by the Cámara Argentina de Productores de Fonogramas y Videogramas (CAPIF). In other Latin American countries such as Brazil, the album attained success according to some media reports. The album achieved a Platinum certification in Central America. Across Europe, the album peaked in Spain at number thirty-two and remained in the chart for twelve consecutive weeks, and in Greece, Primera Fila entered within the top ten.

== Accolades ==
Award	Year	Category	Result	Ref.
Latin Grammy Awards	2010	Best Long Form Music Video	Nominated	
Premios Oye!	2010	General Spanish / Album of the Year	Nominated	
Orgullosamente Latino Award	2010	Latin Album of the Year	Nominated	
Premios Juventud	2010	Me muero sin ese CD	Nominated	
People en Español Awards	2010	Album of the Year	Nominated	

== Personnel ==
- Cristina Abaroa - Music Preparation
- Cheche Alara - Arreglos, Fender Rhodes, Piano
- Ricardo Arjona - Composer
- Aureo Baqueiro - Arreglos, Producer
- Reyli Barba - Composer
- Nick Baxter - Pro-Tools
- Maria Bernal - Composer
- Pedro Capó - Primary Artist
- Isabel de Jesús - A&R
- Mario Domm - Composer
- Estéfano - Composer
- Alonso Salgado Fabio - Composer
- Marco Flores - Composer
- Paul Forat - Producer
- Leonel García - Composer
- Shari Girdlestone - Contractor
- Juan Luis Guerra - Composer
- Leyla Hoyle - Coros
- Antonio Marcos - Composer
- Mário Marcos - Composer
- Nate Morton - Bateria
- Justin Moskevich - Pro-Tools
- Tommy Mottola - Executive Producer
- Carlos Murguía - Coros
- Joanne Oriti - Associate Producer
- Raúl Ornelas - Composer
- Espinoza Paz - Composer
- Donato Póveda - Composer
- Mario Pupparo - Composer
- Julio Reyes - Composer
- Matt Rohde - Wurlitzer
- Kike Santander - Composer
- Joan Sebastían - Composer, Primary Artist
- Thalia - Composer, Primary Artist, Quotation Author
- Afo Verde - Composer
- Ileana Vogel - Coros
- Paco Peres - producer remixer

== Track listing ==
Standard edition
No.	Title	Writer(s)	Length
1.	"Cosiéndome el corazón"	Raúl Ornelas	4:21
2.	"Enséñame a vivir"	Reyli Barba	4:22
3.	"Qué será de ti"	Antonio Marcos; Mario Marcos	4:38
4.	"Cómo"	Thalía; Leonel García	4:18
5.	"El Próximo Viernes"	Espinoza Paz	4:09
6.	"Medley: No Me Enseñaste / Tú Y Yo / Entre El Mar Y Una Estrella / María La Del Barrio)" (^{1})	Marco Flores; Kike Santander; Estéfano; Julio Reyes; Mario Pupparo	7:48
7.	"Estoy enamorado" (featuring Pedro Capó)	Donato Poveda; Alfonso Salgado	4:39
8.	"Equivocada"	Mario Domm; María Bernal	4:02
9.	"Brindis"	Afo Verde	4:34
10.	"Con la duda" (featuring Joan Sebastian)	Joan Sebastian	3:16
11.	"Cuando te beso"	Juan Luis Guerra	3:51
12.	"Ya lo sabía"	Thalía; García	3:08
13.	"Mujeres"	Ricardo Arjona	3:29

Walmart Special Edition
No.	Title	Writer(s)	Length
1.	"Qué será de ti"	A. Marcos; M. Marcos	4:38
2.	"Equivocada"	Domm; Bernal	4:02
3.	"Medley"	Flores; Santander; Estéfano; Reyes; Pupparo	8:13
4.	"Con la duda"	Sebastian	3:10
5.	"Estoy enamorado"	Poveda; Salgado	4:30
6.	"Ay, Amor"	José Flores	3:55

Primera Fila...Un Año Después (Argentina/USA Edition)
No.	Title	Writer(s)	Length
1.	"Estoy enamorado (featuring Pedro Capó)"	Poveda; Salgado	4:39
2.	"Brindis"	Afo Verde	4:34
3.	"Cómo"	Thalía; García	4:18
4.	"Equivocada"	Domm; Bernal	4:02
5.	"Qué será de ti"	A. Marcos; M. Marcos	4:38
6.	"Con la duda (featuring Joan Sebastian)"	Sebastian	3:16
7.	"Ay, Amor"	Flores	3:55
8.	"Pienso en Ti"	Aureo Baqueiro; Xavier Asali De La Mora	4:15
9.	"Enséñame a vivir (Dance Remix)" (^{2})	Barba	5:36
10.	"Equivocada (Bachata Version)" (^{3})	Domm; Bernal	4:01

Notes

- ^{1} Medley : "Entre el mar y una estrella","Piel morena", "No me enseñaste", "Amor a la mexicana"
- ^{2} Remixed by Paco Perez
- ^{3} Produced by Lenny Santos (Aventura)
- DVD and Blu-ray editions feature the concert plus the documentary "Las muchas vidas de Thalía"

== Singles ==
1. Equivocada - Official First Single
2. Enséñame a Vivir (iTunes Promo) - Official Third Single: Argentina, Central America and Spain.
3. Estoy Enamorado "Duet with Pedro Capó"(iTunes Promo) - Official Third Single: Mexico, the United States and Puerto Rico.
4. El Próximo Viernes (iTunes Promo)
5. Medley (Video Promo Single)
6. Qué Será De Ti (Como vai você) / Qué Será De Ti (Banda Version) - Official Second Single
7. Con La Duda "Duet with Joan Sebastian" (Radio Single) - Official Third Single: For Regional Radio in Mexico, the United States and Puerto Rico.
8. Mujeres (Radio Single)
9. Cuando Te Beso (Radio Single)

=== Digital singles ===
1. Pienso En Ti (2009)
2. Estoy Enamorado [Karaoke](2010)
3. Enséñame A Vivir [Remix] (2010) produced by Paco Perez.

== Charts ==
=== Weekly charts ===
Chart (2009–2011)	Peak position
Greek Albums (IFPI Greece)	6
Mexican Albums (Top 100 Mexico)	1
Spanish Albums (Promusicae)	32
US Billboard 200	198
US Top Latin Albums (Billboard)	4
US Latin Pop Albums (Billboard)	2

=== Monthly charts ===
Charts (2009)	Peak position
Argentine Albums (CAPIF)	7

=== Year-end charts ===
Chart (2009)	Position
Mexico (Mexican Albums Chart)	19
Chart (2010)	Position
Mexico (Mexican Albums Chart)	2
US Top Latin Albums	17
US Latin Pop Albums	7
Chart (2011)	Position
Mexico (Mexican Albums Chart)	6
Chart (2012)	Position
Mexico (Mexican Albums Chart)	40

== Certifications and sales ==
Region	Certification	Certified units/sales
Mexico (AMPROFON)	2× Diamond+Platinum	660,000^{‡}
United States	—	96,000
Summaries
Central America	Platinum	10,000
Latin America	—	500,000
Worldwide	—	1,000,000
^{‡} Sales+streaming figures based on certification alone.
