= Manías =

Single by Thalía

from the album Habítame Siempre
- Released: October 8, 2012
- Recorded: 2012
- Genre: Latin pop, adult contemporary
- Length: 3:54
- Label: Sony Music
- Songwriter: Raul Ornelas

Thalía singles chronology
"El Próximo Viernes" (2010)	"Manías" (2012)	"The Way You Look Tonight" (2012)

"Manías" ("Hobbies") is a Latin pop ballad by Mexican singer Thalía, from her eleventh studio album Habítame Siempre. The song was written and composed by Raul Ornelas and was released worldwide by Sony Music as the lead single from the album on October 8, 2012. It marks Thalía's return to music after four years without a studio recorded single released.

As Thalía announced herself through her official Twitter account, the song is dedicated to her mother, who died last year. "Manías" has received highly positive reviews from the critics, who acclaimed Thalía's artistic evolution and vocal abilities. It also had a positive impact in digital sales, managing to debut in over 20 countries on the first day of its release, reaching the top position in many of them. Thalía performed the song live for the first time in her special Univision TV concert entitled "Habitame Siempre". Her concert was broadcast on Univision Network in the United States on November 18, 2012.

== Live performances ==
Thalia performed the song in a special TV concert in which she presented a small part of her album, apart from performing some of the most representative hits of her career. Her concert was broadcast on Univision Network in the United States on November 18, 2012, and Televisa Network in Mexico on November 24. The concert took place in the Hammerstein Ballroom in New York City on September 21, 2012. During the concert, Thalia revealed that "Manías" would be released as the first single from her album.

She also performed the song in Univision's anniversary for "Sabado Gigante" show, on October 27, 2012, and some weeks later in La Voz, a Mexican TV reality talent show and singing competition.

During her promotional tour in Spain, Thalía presented the song to the Spanish audience in a stunning live performance at the annual Cadena Dial Awards, that took place in Tenerife on March 13, 2013. She is also expected to include the song in the setlist of her VIVA! Tour, set to be launched at March 24, 2013 in Chicago. In total, she has publicly performed the song 4 times up to date.

== Music video ==
A "making of" video premiered on VEVO on November 9, 2012. It featured background scenes from the recording of the song in the studio. The official music video of the song premiered on VEVO on December 18, 2012. The video was recorded in the Hammerstein Ballroom in New York and it features Thalía's live performance of the song. The same video had been used during the week of the album's release as part of a promotional TV special.

== Commercial performance ==
In Mexico, the digital single of the track had sold over 30,000 copies by February 16, 2013, being certified as gold by AMPROFON and later it was certified Platinum.

== Track listing ==
- Digital download
1. "Manías" – 3:54
2. "Manías (Jump Smokers Remix)" - 4:17
3. "Manías (Bachata Remix)" - 3:51
- CD single
1. "Manías" - 3:54

== Charts ==
Chart (2012 - 2013)	Peak position
Mexico (Billboard Mexican Airplay)	1
Mexico (Billboard Espanol Airplay)	1
Mexico (Monitor Latino)	4
Spain (PROMUSICAE)	35
US Hot Latin Songs (Billboard)	26
US Latin Airplay (Billboard)	31
US Latin Pop Airplay (Billboard)	14
US Tropical Airplay (Billboard)	40

== Certifications ==
Region	Certification	Certified units/sales
Mexico (AMPROFON)	Platinum	60,000^{*}
^{*} Sales figures based on certification alone.

== Release history ==
Region	Date	Format
Worldwide	October 8, 2012	Digital download
Latin America	October 8, 2012	Digital download, Radio single
Mexico	October 20, 2012	Radio single, CD single
United States	October 22, 2012	Spanish Contemporary radio

== Credits ==
- Interpreter : Thalía
- Producer : Cheche Alara
- Voice directors : Cheche Alara, Paul Forat
- Voice engineer : Rafa Sardina, Pablo Arraya
- Recording engineer : Rafa Sardina
- Arrangements : Cheche Alara
- String arrangements : Cheche Alara
- Piano, Hammond, Wurli and keyboards : Cheche Alara
- Drums : Randy Cooke
- Acoustic and Electric Guitar : Tim Pierce
- Percussion : Luis Conte
- Bass : Lee Sklar
- Chorus : Facundo Monty, Jonathan Eugenio, Camila Ibarra, Ayelén Zuker
- Mixed by : Peter Mokran
- (P) 2012 Sony Music Entertainment US Latin LLC
