= Equivocada =

Single by Thalía

from the album Primera fila
- Released: 7 October 2009
- Recorded: 30 July 2009 in Miami, Florida
- Genre: Latin pop
- Length: 4:02
- Label: Latin
- Songwriters: Mario Domm, Maria Bernal
- Producer: Aureo Baqueiro

Thalía singles chronology
"Será porque te amo" (2008)	"Equivocada" (2009)	"Qué será de ti" (2010)

"Equivocada" (Mistake) is the lead single of the live album Primera fila by Mexican pop star Thalía. The single was officially released on October 7, 2009. It is a tragic love ballad. The song is a success for Thalía, already exceeding the number of digital sales in Mexico, Latin America, USA and Europe. The song peaked at No. 2 in the Latin Pop songs category on the Billboard charts and No. 8 on the Hot Latin Songs chart.

== Critical reception ==
Monica Herrera from Billboard Magazine gave a positive review for the song, saying that: "For the first single from her live album 'Thalía en Primera Fila', Mexican pop star Thalía delivers a moving ballad about a once-serious relationship that turned out to be a mistake. 'I was always wrong, and I just didn't want to see it,' she sings in Spanish. 'Because for you I gave my life/Because everything that begins also ends.' After a string of dance-pop singles that aimed for a crossover audience, it's refreshing to hear Thalía pull back and tackle a downtempo number with a classic feel, particularly in a live setting that allows her to showcase her vocals. Thalía recently posted a YouTube clip of herself in the studio with Aventura recording a bachata version of 'Equivocada'."

The music video of the song is the live performance by Thalía in Bank United Center (Miami) on 29 July 2009.

== Live performances ==
Thalía performed "Equivocada" on the Christmas special, "Nuestra Navidad", that broadcast on Univision. The special was recorded this past November 11 at Rockefeller Center in New York City, and features two performances by Thalía, a Spanish rendition of "Rudolph the Red-Nosed Reindeer," alongside a group of children, and her new hit single, "Equivocada", the first track to promote her new album, "Thalía:En Primera Fila".

Thalía also sang "Equivocada" on a special Telethon "Unidos Por Haiti" engineered by Univision TV in which some of greatest Latin American stars (Shakira, Richy Martin, Daddy Yankee, Chayanne, Enrique Iglesias, Juanes, Gloria Estefan, Luis Fonsi and more) performed their songs in order to save money for the victims of Haiti's earthquake.

Thalía performed "Equivocada" on the Spanish show "Más Que Baile" on April 14, 2010. She also performed this song on a Mexican morning show called "Hoy" with Qué Será De Ti.

== Promotional CD single ==
1. Equivocada (Live Version) – 4:05

== Official versions ==
1. Equivocada (Radio Version)
2. Equivocada (Album Version)
3. Equivocada (Bachata Version). Production: Lenny Santos (Aventura)
4. Equivocada (Regional/Duranguense Version) featuring Patrulla 81

== Charts ==
=== Weekly charts ===
Chart (2009–2010)	Position
Guatemala (EFE)	6
Mexico (Monitor Latino)	1
Panama (EFE)	1
Peru (UNIMPRO)	4
Russian Airplay (Tophit)	341
US Hot Latin Songs (Billboard)	8
US Latin Pop Airplay (Billboard)	2
US Tropical Songs (Billboard)	40

=== Year-end charts ===
Chart (2010)	Position
Mexico (Monitor Latino)	20
United States Billboard Hot Latin Songs	54
United States Billboard Latin Pop Songs	18

== Certifications and sales ==
Region	Certification	Certified units/sales
Mexico (AMPROFON)	Gold	30,000^{*}
^{*} Sales figures based on certification alone.

== Credits ==
- Mario Domm/María Bernal: Composer
- Thalía: Interpreter
- Aureo Baqueiro: Producer
- Recording Country: United States
- Sony / ATV Discos Music Publishing LLC / Westwood Publishing
- (P) 2009 Sony Music Entertainment US Latin LLC
