= Paradiso (Lucio Battisti Songbook) =

Compilation album by Mina
- Released: 30 November 2018
- Recorded: 1970–2018
- Genre: Pop; rock
- Length: 130:42 (CD); 115:41 (LP)
- Language: Italian; Spanish; French
- Label: Warner; PDU
- Producer: Massimiliano Pani

Mina chronology
Maeba (2018)	Paradiso (Lucio Battisti Songbook) (2018)	Mina Fossati (2019)

Singles from Paradiso (Lucio Battisti Songbook)
- 1. "Il tempo di morire" Released: 16 November 2018; 2. "Vento nel vento" Released: 11 January 2019

Professional ratings
Review scores
Source	Rating
Rockol	8/10
SentireAscoltare	6,5/10

Paradiso (Lucio Battisti Songbook) is a compilation album by Italian singer Mina, released on 30 November 2018 by Warner Music Italy and PDU. The compilation contains all of Lucio Battisti's songs recorded by Mina throughout her career. Many of them have already been previously published on the albums Minacantalucio and Mazzini canta Battisti, released respectively in 1975 and 1994. The album also features (but only on the CD version) Spanish and French versions of songs recorded in the seventies.

== Track listing ==
All lyrics are written by Mogol except where noted; all music is composed by Lucio Battisti.

=== CD edition ===
CD1
No.	Title	Length
1.	"Vento nel vento"	4:36
2.	"Il tempo di morire"	4:06
3.	"Io e te da soli"	4:37
4.	"Eppur mi son scordato di te"	3:34
5.	"Perché no"	5:12
6.	"Insieme"	4:12
7.	"Io vorrei... non vorrei... ma se vuoi"	3:13
8.	"Con il nastro rosa"	4:55
9.	"Nessun dolore"	4:16
10.	"E penso a te"	3:40
11.	"Acqua azzurra, acqua chiara"	4:13
12.	"Amor mio"	4:46
13.	"La mente torna"	4:26
14.	"Il leone e la gallina"	3:52
15.	"Io vivrò senza te" (Live da Bussoladomani)	4:57
16.	"Emozioni / Ancora tu / Si, viaggiare / I giardini di marzo" (Medley [Live])	9:33

CD2
No.	Title	Lyrics	Length
1.	"I giardini di marzo"		6:04
2.	"Il nostro caro angelo"		4:08
3.	"Dieci ragazzi"		2:36
4.	"Innocenti evasioni"		3:24
5.	"7 e 40"		3:35
6.	"Emozioni"		4:35
7.	"Fiori rosa fiori di pesco"		3:04
8.	"29 settembre"		3:34
9.	"L'aquila"		4:30
10.	"Non è Francesca"		3:34
11.	"Amor mio" (Spanish version)	Augusto Algueró	4:50
12.	"Yo pienso en ti" (Spanish version of "E penso a te")	Crescencio Prada	3:43
13.	"Juntos" (Spanish version of "Insieme")	Julio Caesar	4:09
14.	"Que nos separemos" (Spanish version of "Io e te da soli")	Augusto Algueró	4:33
15.	"La mente cambia" (Spanish version of "La mente torna")	Crescencio Prada	4:27
16.	"L'amour est mort" (French version of "Io e te da soli")	Jacques Demarny	4:30
Total length:			130:42

=== LP edition ===
Side A
No.	Title	Length
1.	"Vento nel vento"	4:36
2.	"Il tempo di morire"	4:06
3.	"Io e te da soli"	4:37
4.	"Eppur mi son scordato di te"	3:34
5.	"Io vorrei... non vorrei... ma se vuoi"	3:13

Side B
No.	Title	Length
1.	"Perché no"	5:12
2.	"Insieme"	4:12
3.	"Con il nastro rosa"	4:55
4.	"E penso a te"	3:40

Side C
No.	Title	Length
1.	"Nessun dolore"	4:16
2.	"Acqua azzurra, acqua chiara"	4:13
3.	"Amor mio"	4:46
4.	"La mente torna"	4:26

Side D
No.	Title	Length
1.	"Il leone e la gallina"	3:52
2.	"Io vivrò senza te" (Live da Bussoladomani)	4:57
3.	"Emozioni / Ancora tu / Si, viaggiare / I giardini di marzo" (Medley [Live])	9:33

Side E
No.	Title	Length
1.	"I giardini di marzo"	6:04
2.	"Il nostro caro angelo"	4:08
3.	"Dieci ragazzi"	2:36
4.	"Innocenti evasioni"	3:24
5.	"7 e 40"	3:35

Side F
No.	Title	Length
1.	"Emozioni"	4:35
2.	"Fiori rosa fiori di pesco"	3:04
3.	"29 settembre"	3:34
4.	"L’aquila"	4:30
5.	"Non è Francesca"	3:34
Total length:		115:41

== Charts ==
=== Weekly charts ===
Weekly chart performance for Paradiso (Lucio Battisti Songbook)
Chart (2018)	Peak position
Italian Albums (FIMI)	2
Italian Vinyl Albums (FIMI)	2

=== Year-end charts ===
2018 year-end chart performance for Paradiso (Lucio Battisti Songbook)
Chart (2018)	Position
Italian Albums (FIMI)	38

== Certifications and sales ==
Certifications for Paradiso (Lucio Battisti Songbook)
Region	Certification	Certified units/sales
Italy (FIMI)	Platinum	50,000^{‡}
^{‡} Sales+streaming figures based on certification alone.
