= Mazzini canta Battisti =

Compilation album by Mina
- Released: 13 May 1994
- Recorded: 1971–1994
- Studio: La Basilica, Milan, Italy; Studi PDU, Lugano, Switzerland
- Genre: Pop; rock
- Length: 55:43
- Language: Italian
- Label: PDU
- Producer: Massimiliano Pani

Mina chronology
Lochness (1994)	Mazzini canta Battisti (1994)	Canarino mannaro (1994)

Professional ratings
Review scores
Source	Rating
AllMusic	3/5 stars

Mazzini canta Battisti is a compilation album by Mina, released in 1994 by PDU.

== Overview ==
The album name is derived from the surnames of Mina and the songwriter and singer Lucio Battisti, hence Mazzini canta Battisti. This is also the first time in Mina's recording history that her surname appears on an album of hers. This is the second tribute album that Mina has recorded, the first being the 1975 album Minacantalucio. In contrast to the album Minacantalucio which was composed of 10 new recordings of Lucio Battisti, this album contains only two new recordings, "Perché no" and "Il leone e la gallina". The rest are songs Mina has recorded before.

"Insieme" was originally on the 1970 album ...quando tu mi spiavi in cima a un batticuore.... "Io e te da soli" was originally on the 1971 live album Del mio meglio. "Amor mio" and "E penso a te" were originally on the 1971 album Mina. "La mente torna" was originally on the 1973 album Del mio meglio n. 2. The medley "Emozioni / Ancora tu / Sì, viaggiare / I giardini di marzo" was originally on the live album Mina Live '78. Full length versions of the tracks "Emozioni" and "I giardini di marzo" are found on the 1975 album Minacantalucio. "Acqua azzurra, acqua chiara" was roginially on the 1984 album Catene. "Eppur mi son scordato di te" was originally on the 1985 album Finalmente ho conosciuto il conte Dracula.... "Nessun dolore" was originally on the 1987 album Rane supreme. "Io vorrei... non-vorrei... ma se vuoi..." was originally on the 1989 album Uiallalla.

== Track listing ==
All lyrics are written by Mogol; all music is composed by Lucio Battisti.

No.	Title	Length
1.	"Perché no"	5:12
2.	"Nessun dolore"	4:16
3.	"Io e te da soli"	4:37
4.	"Amor mio"	4:49
5.	"La mente torna"	4:32
6.	"Eppur mi son scordato di te"	3:34
7.	"Io vorrei... non-vorrei... ma se vuoi..."	3:13
8.	"Il leone e la gallina"	3:52
9.	"E penso a te"	3:37
10.	"Insieme"	4:12
11.	"Acqua azzurra, acqua chiara"	4:13
12.	"Emozioni / Ancora tu / Sì, viaggiare / I giardini di marzo"	9:33

== Personnel ==
- Mina – vocals (all tracks)
- Massimiliano Pani – arrangement (1, 2, 6, 7, 8)
- Gian Piero Reverberi – arrangement (3, 4, 5)
- Mario Robbiani – arrangement (6)
- Pino Presti – arrangement (9, 12)
- Detto Mariano – arrangement (10)
- Victor Bach – arrangement (11)
- Nuccio Rinaldis – sound engineer

== Charts ==
Initial chart performance for Mazzini canta Battisti
Chart (1994)	Peak position
European Albums (Music & Media)	64
Italian Albums (Musica e dischi)	5

2005 chart performance for Mazzini canta Battisti
Chart (2005)	Peak position
Italian Albums (FIMI)	91
