= Anima latina =

Studio album by Lucio Battisti
- Released: December 1974
- Studio: Fono Roma (Cologno Monzese)
- Genre: Progressive rock, pop rock, psychedelic rock
- Length: 47:59
- Label: Numero Uno
- Producer: Lucio Battisti, Mogol

Lucio Battisti chronology
Il nostro caro angelo (1973)	Anima latina (1974)	Lucio Battisti, la batteria, il contrabbasso, eccetera (1976)

Professional ratings
Review scores
Source	Rating
Allmusic	4/5 stars
Ondarock	– milestone

Anonimo
Anonimo's ending, with the self-parodistic quotation of I giardini di marzo

Il salame
Il salame shows the use of advanced recording devices and editing techniques

Macchina del tempo
Macchina del tempo, track #10

Anima latina (Latin soul) is the ninth studio album by the Italian singer-songwriter Lucio Battisti. It was released in December 1974 by Numero Uno. The album was arranged and produced by the lyricist Mogol and Battisti in its entirety, with performances by various semi-unknown musicians. It is considered one of Battisti's masterpieces for signaling a significant departure from his previous records. Anima latina was Italy's eighth best-selling album of 1975.

== The album ==
Anima latina was meant by Battisti as an experiment, "the exact point of rupture between [his] yesterday and [his] tomorrow". The album was conceived after a trip which Battisti took to South America and is particularly influenced by Brazilian music.

== Charts ==
=== Weekly charts ===
Chart (1974–5)	Highest position
Italy (Musica e dischi)	1

Chart (2007–11)	Peak position
Italy (FIMI)	81

== Track listing ==
All lyrics written by Mogol, all music composed by Battisti.

1. "Abbracciala abbracciali abbracciati" (Embrace Her, Embrace Them, Embrace Yourself) – 7:04
2. "Due mondi" (Two Worlds) – 5:13
3. "Anonimo" (Anonymous) – 7:03
4. "Gli uomini celesti" (The Celestial Men) – 5:06
5. "Gli uomini celesti (ripresa)" (The Celestial Men (reprise)) – 0:52
6. "Due mondi (ripresa)" (Two Worlds (reprise)) – 1:10
7. "Anima latina" (Latin Soul) – 6:37
8. "Il salame" (The Salami) – 3:38
9. "La nuova America" (The New America) – 2:49
10. "Macchina del tempo" (Time Machine) – 6:59
11. "Separazione naturale" (Natural Separation) – 1:28

== Personnel ==
- Alberto Radius - backing vocals
- Gianni Bogliano - trombone
- Lucio Battisti - arranger, theorbo, composer, guitar, keyboards, piano, primary artist, vocals
- Fabio Berruti - artwork, graphic design
- Piero Bravin - sound technician
- Pippo Colucci - trumpet
- Mara Cubeddu - vocals (on "Due mondi"), backing vocals
- Gianni Dall'Aglio - drums
- La Rosa, Antonio - remastering
- Massimo Luca - guitar
- Claudio Maioli - keyboards
- Mogol - composer
- Caesar Monti - photography
- Gigi Mucciolo - trumpet
- Dodo Nileb (Franco Loprevite) - percussion
- Claudio Pascoli - drums, flute
- Gneo Pompeo - strings, synthesizer
- Bob Wayne (Bob Callero) - bass, basso continuo

The name "Gneo Pompeo" (Italian for Gnaeus Pompeius) is a pseudonym and is widely believed to stand for Gian Piero Reverberi. It has also been claimed that it stands for Gabriele Lorenzi.
