= Pensieri e parole =

Single by Lucio Battisti

from the album Lucio Battisti Vol. 4
- B-side: "Insieme a te sto bene"
- Released: 4 May 1971
- Genre: Pop; blues
- Label: Dischi Ricordi
- Songwriter(s): Lucio Battisti, Mogol

Lucio Battisti singles chronology
"Emozioni" (1970)	"Pensieri e parole" (1971)	"Dio mio no" (1971)

Audio
- "Pensieri e parole" on YouTube

"Pensieri e parole" (lit. 'Thoughts and Words') is a 1971 song composed by Lucio Battisti (music) and Mogol (lyrics), arranged by Gian Piero Reverberi and performed by Lucio Battisti.

The song consists of an inner dialogue with himself, addressed with two different melodic lines that intersect with each other.

== Cover versions ==
Artists who covered the song include Mia Martini, Massimo Ranieri, Marcella Bella, Formula 3, Mino Reitano, Sandro Giacobbe, Cristiano De André, Lena Biolcati. The song was also covered in French by Jean-François Michael with the title "Un an déjà" and in Swedish by Sylvia Vrethammar as "Tankar och ord". It was sampled by Claudio Bisio in the number-one hit rap song "Rapput".

== Track listing ==
No.	Title	Length
1.	"Pensieri e parole"	3:55
2.	"Insieme a te sto bene"	3:48

== Charts ==
Chart (1971)	Peak position
Italy (Musica e dischi)	1
