= Lucio Battisti Vol. 2 =

Studio album by Lucio Battisti
- Released: July 1970
- Genre: Pop; Blues
- Label: Dischi Ricordi
- Producer: Lucio Battisti, Mogol

Lucio Battisti chronology
Lucio Battisti (1969)	Lucio Battisti Vol. 2 (1970)	Emozioni (1970)
- Released on cassette only.

Lucio Battisti Vol. 2 is the second studio album by the Italian singer-songwriter Lucio Battisti. It was released in July 1970 by Dischi Ricordi.

It was only published as a compact cassette. It contains three songs from Battisti's first album ("Prigioniero del mondo", "Un’avventura" and "Nel sole, nel vento, nel sorriso e nel pianto") and various other songs that were released in a stereo version for the first time.

== Charts ==
Chart (2018)	Peak position
Italy (FIMI)	93

== Track listing ==
All lyrics written by Mogol; music by Battisti, except where indicated.

Side A

1. "Fiori rosa, fiori di pesco" – 3:16
2. "7 e 40" – 3:32
3. "Acqua azzurra, acqua chiara" – 3:36
4. "Prigioniero del mondo" – 3:26 (Mogol, Donida)
5. "Dolce di giorno" – 2:38 (Mogol, Battisti, Angiolini)
6. "Mi ritorni in mente"' – 3:41

Side B

1. "Il tempo di morire" – 5:40
2. "Un'avventura" – 3:10
3. "Dieci ragazze" – 2:54
4. "Nel sole, nel vento, nel sorriso e nel pianto" – 2:45
5. "Luisa Rossi" – 2:44 (Mogol, Battisti, Angiolini)
6. "Era" – 2:56 (Mogol, Battisti, Angiolini)

== Personnel ==
- Lucio Battisti: voice, guitar
- Flavio Premoli – keyboards, piano
- Dario Baldan Bembo – keyboards, piano
- Demetrio Stratos – keyboards, piano
- Gabriele Lorenzi – keyboards, piano
- Mario Totaro – keyboards, piano
- Renato Angiolini – keyboards, piano
- Alberto Radius – guitar
- Franco Mussida – guitar
- Andrea Sacchi – guitar
- Damiano Dattoli – bass
- Angel Salvador – bass
- Giovanni Tommaso – bass
- Giorgio Piazza – bass
- Frank Laugelli – bass
- Gianni Dall'Aglio – drums
- Franz Di Cioccio – drums
- Leonello Bionda – drums
- Sergio Panno – drums
- Pietruccio Montalbetti – harmonica
- I 4+4 di Nora Orlandi – backing singers
