= Fiori rosa fiori di pesco =

Single by Lucio Battisti

from the album Emozioni
- B-side: "Il tempo di morire"
- Released: 8 June 1970
- Genre: Pop; blues
- Label: Dischi Ricordi
- Songwriter(s): Lucio Battisti, Mogol

Lucio Battisti singles chronology
"Mi ritorni in mente" (1969)	"Fiori rosa fiori di pesco" (1970)	"Emozioni" (1970)

Audio
- "Fiori rosa fiori di pesco" on YouTube

"Fiori rosa fiori di pesco" (lit. 'Pink Flowers, Peach Flowers') is a 1970 song composed by Lucio Battisti (music) and Mogol (lyrics), arranged by Detto Mariano and performed by Lucio Battisti.

The song was composed back-to-back with Mina's "Insieme", and Battisti initially considered handing the song to her. A massive success, it won the Festivalbar, marking the second victory in a row for Battisti following the 1969 win with "Acqua azzurra, acqua chiara".

Artists who covered the song include Mina, Marcella Bella, Formula 3, Cristiano De André.

== Track listing ==
No.	Title	Length
1.	"Fiori rosa fiori di pesco"	3:14
2.	"Il tempo di morire"	5:38

== Charts ==
Chart (1970)	Peak position
Italy (Musica e dischi)	2
