= Il mio canto libero (song) =

1972 song by Lucio Battisti

Single by Lucio Battisti

from the album Il mio canto libero
- B-side: "Confusione"
- Released: November 1972
- Recorded: Fonorama Studios, Milan
- Genre: Pop
- Length: 5:09
- Label: Numero Uno
- Songwriters: Lucio Battisti, Mogol
- Producer: Lucio Battisti

Lucio Battisti singles chronology
"I giardini di marzo" (1972)	"Il mio canto libero" (1972)	"La collina dei ciliegi" (1973)

Audio
- "Il mio canto libero" on YouTube

"Il mio canto libero" (My Free Song) is a song written by Italian singer-songwriter Lucio Battisti and lyricist Mogol. The song was recorded by Battisti for the album of the same title, and released as a single in November 1972 for Mogol's recording label Numero Uno. The song was a commercial success in Italy, topping the Musica e dischi singles chart for nine consecutive weeks in 1973 and becoming the third best-selling single of the year. During the following years, it was covered by several artists, and it became a classic of Italian popular music. It was certified double platinum by the Federation of the Italian Music Industry in 2024, for domestic equivalent sales exceeding 200,000 units since 2009.

The front cover of the single is a photograph by Cesare Monti, showing an eye with a white background.

== Background and composition ==
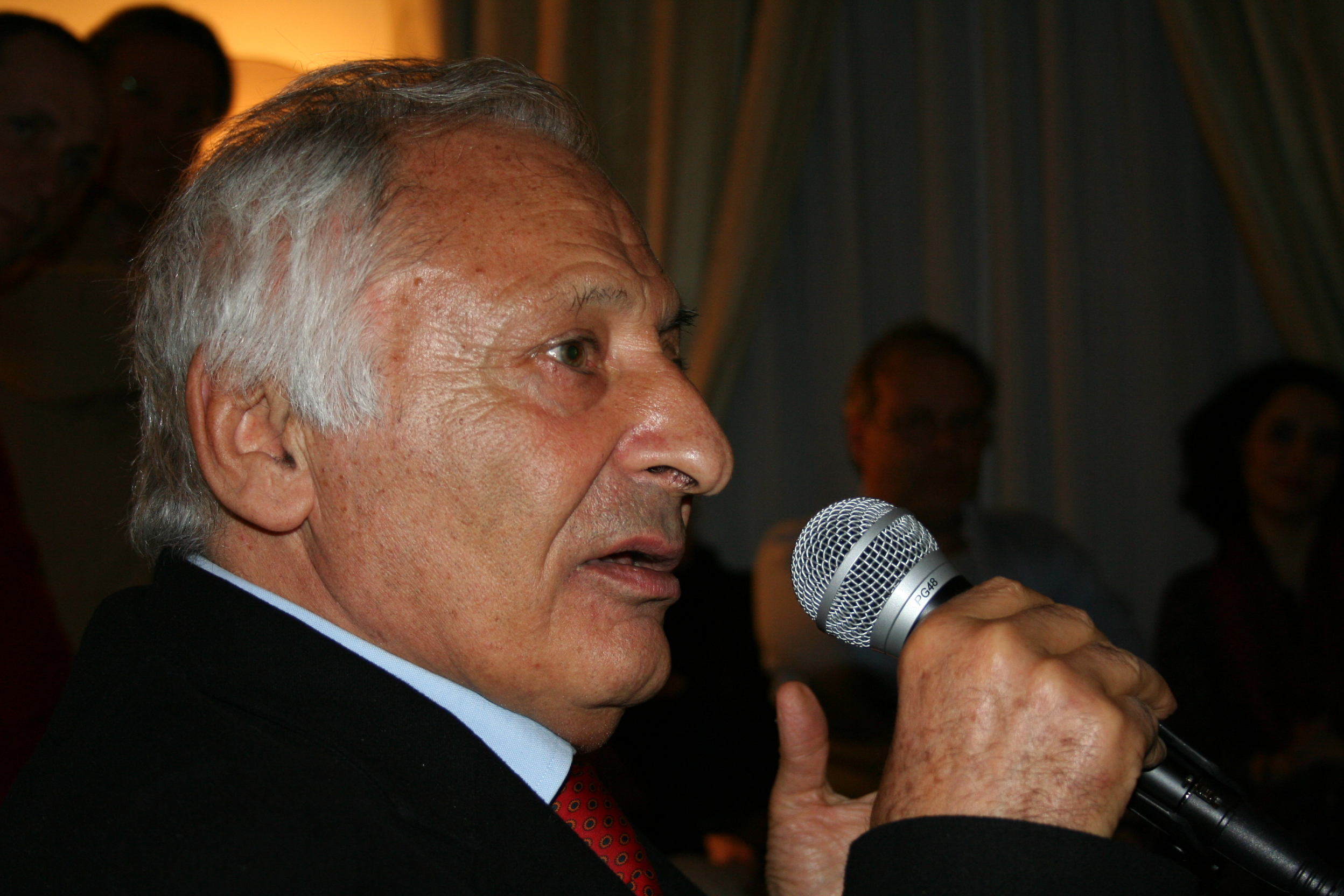
Mogol wrote the lyrics of the song, inspired by his relationship with a young woman after his separation from his wife.

"Il mio canto libero" was written by Mogol and Battisti, and it was produced by Battisti himself. As revealed by Mogol after Battisti's death, it was initially proposed to Mina, who refused to record the song, because she felt it was not strong enough to become a hit.

The song deals with individual freedom, describing the feelings of a young couple which faces with hope the difficult moment when they have to start living as adults, while feeling a shared sense of alienation within a society they consider hypocritical. During an interview released in 2009 to the Italian newspaper Corriere della Sera, Mogol explained that "The Italian society in that years was very conformist. And [in the song] there's a couple which rises up against conventions, claiming a right to individual liberty, a right to love." As revealed by Mogol himself, the song was inspired by Mogol's relationship with a young woman after the end of his marriage, and by his feeling that "at that time, the orthodox disapproved that kind of things."

An English-language version of the song, titled "A Song to Feel Alive", with lyrics adapted by Peter Powell, was also recorded by Battisti and included in his album Images, released in 1977. Battisti also recorded the song in Spanish, under the title "Mi libre canción", in French, releasing it as a single in 1973 titled "Ma chanson de liberté", and in German, with lyrics penned by Udo Lindenberg, under the title "Unser freies Lied".

== Cover versions ==
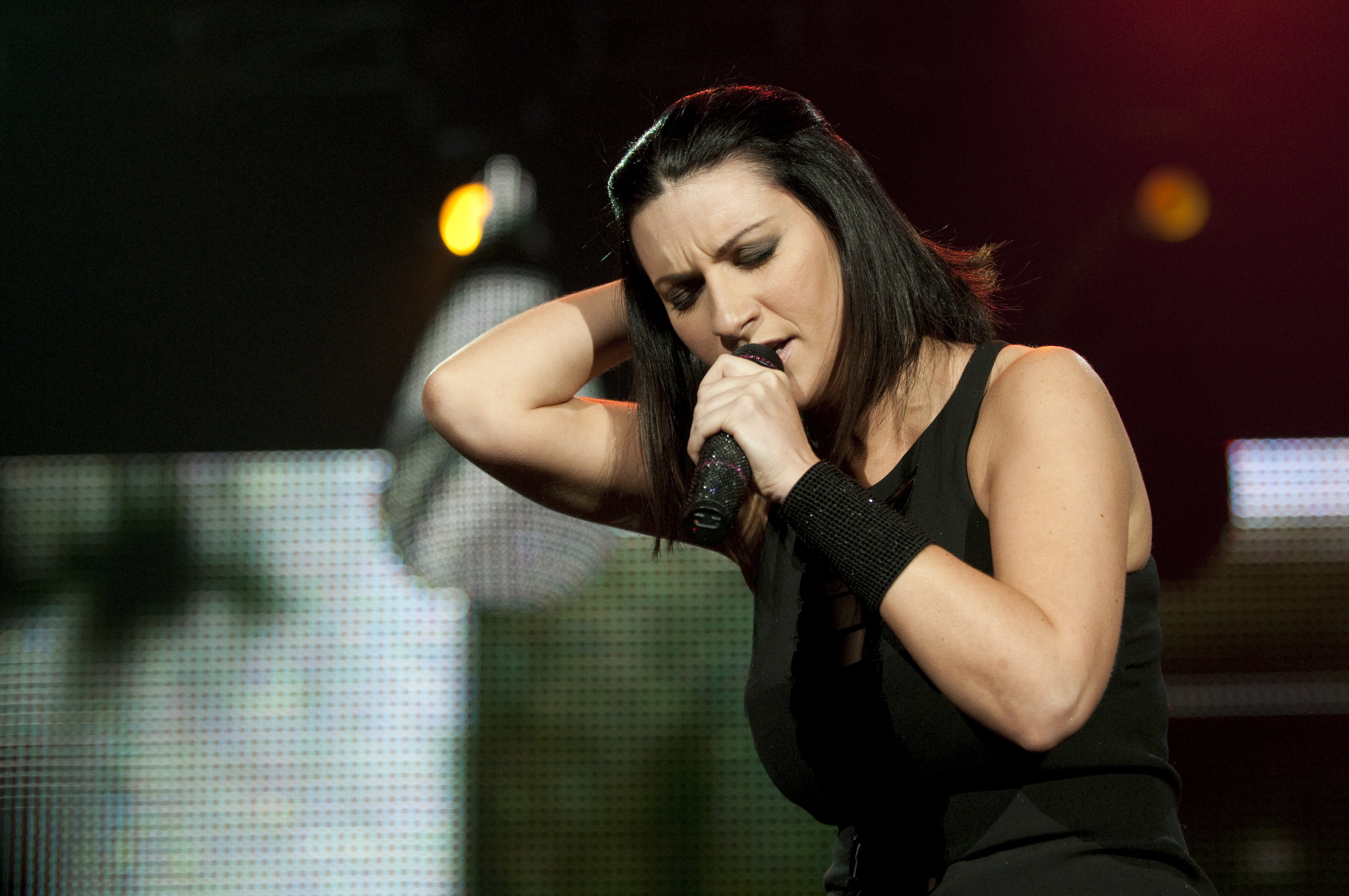
Laura Pausini recorded the song as a duet with Colombian singer Juanes in 2006. She also performed it in 2009, as part of the ensemble Amiche per l'Abruzzo.

A cover of the song was recorded in 1994 by Italian singer-songwriter Cristiano De André. His version of the song was included in the compilation album Innocenti evasioni, a tribute to Battisti by various Italian artists. On the following year, José Feliciano performed the song during the Italian TV show Mina contro Battisti, a competition between songs originally performed by Mina or Lucio Battisti.

In 2003 the song was covered by the players of the Italian football team Juventus FC as part of a charity project aimed at raising funds to rebuild the San Gerolamo of Quarto Abbey in Genoa, to accommodate the children hospitalised at the Istituto Giannina Gaslini. The song was performed by the team, together with a children choir, during the Sanremo Music Festival 2003.

In 2006, Italian singer Laura Pausini covered the song for her album Io canto, dueting with Colombian recording artist Juanes. Pausini and Juanes recorded the song both in Italian and Spanish. The Italian-language version of the song peaked at number 25 on the FIMI Top Digital Downloads in November 2006. On 21 June 2009, the song was performed by all the artists involved in the mega-concert Amiche per l'Abruzzo, featuring 55 Italian female singers and organized to raise funds in support of the victims of the 2009 L'Aquila earthquake. The song was chosen as the closing performance after an online poll. The live performance was later included in the DVD of the event, released in June 2010.

Spanish singers Rosario Flores and Sergio Dalma recorded "Mi libre canción" for their albums Cuéntame and Via Dalma, in 2009 and 2010, respectively. The original version of the song was also covered by Nathalie during the Sanremo Music Festival 2011. A studio recording of her version was included in the compilation album Nata per unire. Other artists who recorded a cover of the song include Fiorello, who included it in the album A modo mio in 2004, and the band Formula 3.

== Track listing ==
- "Il mio canto libero" – 45 rpm single (Numero Uno ZN 50267) – 1972
1. "Il mio canto libero" (Lucio Battisti, Mogol) – 5:09
2. "Confusione" (Battisti, Mogol) – 4:29
- "Ma chanson de liberté" – 45 rpm single (Vogue, Numero Uno NU 3047) – 1973
1. "Ma chanson de liberté" (Lucio Battisti, Mogol, Eddie Marnay) – 5:07
2. "Vento nel vento" (Lucio Battisti, Mogol) – 3:23
- "Mi libre canción" – 45 rpm single (Rca Victor TPBO 9104) – 1973
1. "Mi libre canción" (Lucio Battisti, Mogol, Carlos Ràmon Amàrt) – 5:07
2. "Io vorrei... non vorrei... ma se vuoi..." (Lucio Battisti, Mogol) – 4:36

== Credits and personnel ==
Lucio Battisti was the original performer of the song.

Production and music credits

- Lucio Battisti – vocals, producer, arranger, acoustic guitar, Hawaiian guitar, drums, background vocals
- Gian Piero Reverberi – arranger, orchestra conductor
- Massimo Luca – acoustic guitar, electric guitar
- Mario Lavezzi – guitar, drums
- Reginaldo Ettore – drums
- Gabriele Lorenzi – keyboards
- Gigi Mucciolo – trumpet, trombone
- Gianni Dall'Aglio – drums
- Guido Guglielminetti – bass guitar
- 4+4 di Nora Orlandi – background vocals

== Charts ==
=== Weekly charts ===
Weekly chart performance for "Il mio canto libero"
Chart (1973-1974)	Peak position
Italy (Musica e dischi)	1
Spain (AFYVE)	3

=== Year-end charts ===
Year-end chart performance for "Il mio canto libero"
Chart (1973)	Position
Italy (Musica e dischi)	3

== Certifications and sales ==
Certifications for "Il mio canto libero"
Region	Certification	Certified units/sales
Italy (FIMI) sales since 2009	2× Platinum	200,000^{‡}
^{‡} Sales+streaming figures based on certification alone.
