= Amore e non amore =

Studio album by Lucio Battisti
- Released: July 1971
- Recorded: November 1970
- Genres: Progressive rock, rock and roll, rock
- Length: 35:39
- Label: Dischi Ricordi
- Producers: Lucio Battisti, Mogol

Lucio Battisti chronology
Emozioni (1970)	Amore e non amore (1971)	Lucio Battisti vol. 4 (1971)

Singles from Amore e non amore
- 1. "Dio mio no / Era" Released: July 26, 1971

Professional ratings
Review scores
Source	Rating
Allmusic	4/5 stars
Ondarock	– recommended

Dio mio no
The rock and roll side of the album: Dio mio no

Davanti a un distributore automatico…
The symphonic-progressive side of the album: Davanti a un distributore automatico…

Amore e non amore (Love and non-love) is a concept album by the Italian singer and songwriter Lucio Battisti, and the fourth studio album overall. It was released in July 1971 by Dischi Ricordi.

The album focuses on the contraposition of "love" and "not-love". As a result, the LP is split in two definite "sides", each one made up of four songs:

- The "non-love" side, characterised by a rock and roll music style and lyrics referring to "non-love" situations (e.g. adultery, unrequited or obsessive love, etc.).
- The "love" side, characterised by instrumental tracks with long titles and a progressive rock music style.

The album was Italy's 10th best selling album in 1971, though no song from this disc became nearly as popular as those included in Battisti's other albums from this period.

== Track listing ==
All lyrics written by Mogol, all music composed by Lucio Battisti.

1. "Dio mio no" (My God, No!) – 7:31
2. "Seduto sotto un platano con una margherita in bocca guardando il fiume nero macchiato dalla schiuma bianca dei detersivi" (Sitting under a plane tree with a daisy in the mouth looking at the black river spotted by detersives' white foam) – 3:08
3. "Una" (One) – 3:45
4. "7 agosto di pomeriggio fra le lamiere roventi di un cimitero di automobili solo io, silenzioso eppure straordinariamente vivo" (August 7 in the afternoon among the scorching sheets of a cars' cemetery [there is] only me, silent yet extraordinarily alive) – 4:02
5. "Se la mia pelle vuoi" (If You Want My Skin) – 4:07
6. "Davanti ad un distributore automatico di fiori dell'aereoporto di Bruxelles anch'io chiuso in una bolla di vetro" (In front of a flowers vending machine in Bruxelles's airport I [am] closed in a glass bowl too) – 2:15
7. "Supermarket" – 4:51
8. "Una poltrona, un bicchiere di cognac, un televisore, 35 morti ai confini di Israele e Giordania" (An armchair, a glass of cognac, a television, 35 deaths at the border between Israel and Jordan) – 5:57

== Charts ==
=== Weekly charts ===
Chart (1971–2)	Highest position
Italy (Musica e dischi)	1

== Personnel ==
- Dario Baldan - organ, organo
- Lucio Battisti - arranger, composer, conductor, guitar, keyboards, orchestra director, primary artist, vocals
- Fabio Berruti - artwork, graphic design
- Franz Di Cioccio - drums
- Gary Hobish - reissue mastering
- La Rosa, Antonio - remastering
- Mogol - audio 2 composer
- Francone Mussida - chitarrone, guitar
- Silvio Nobili - cover photo, photography
- Amedeo Pace - liner notes
- Walter Patergnani - engineer
- Giorgio Piazza - bass
- Flavio Premoli - percussion, piano, tambourine, tamburello
- Alberto Radius - chitarrone, guitar
- Nathaniel Russell - reissue art director, reissue layout
- Filippo Salvadori - reissue producer
