= Emozioni =

Studio album by Lucio Battisti
- Released: 15 December 1970
- Genres: Pop; Blues
- Length: 45:31
- Label: Dischi Ricordi
- Producers: Lucio Battisti, Mogol

Lucio Battisti chronology
Lucio Battisti Vol. 2 (1970)	Emozioni (1970)	Amore e non amore (1971)

Professional ratings
Review scores
Source	Rating
AllMusic	4.5/5 stars
Ondarock	– recommended

Fiori rosa, fiori di pesco
Fiori rosa, fiori di pesco, track #1

Il tempo di morire
Il tempo di morire shows Battisti's musical roots: rock and blues and black music

Mi ritorni in mente
Mi ritorni in mente is among the best-known Battisti's songs

Emozioni (Emotions) is the third studio album by the Italian singer-songwriter Lucio Battisti. It was released in 15 December 1970 by Dischi Ricordi.

The album was Italy's fourth-best-selling album in 1971.

== Track listing ==
All lyrics written by Mogol; all music composed by Lucio Battisti.

1. "Fiori rosa fiori di pesco" (Pink Flowers, Peach Flowers) − 3:14
2. "Dolce di giorno" (Sweet by Day) − 2:39
3. "Il tempo di morire" (The Time to Die) − 5:38
4. "Mi ritorni in mente" (You come back to my mind) − 3:41
5. "7 e 40" (7:40) − 3:32
6. "Emozioni" (Emotions) − 4:47
7. "Dieci ragazze" (Ten Girls) − 2:57
8. "Acqua azzurra, acqua chiara" (Azure water, clear water) − 3:33
9. "Era" (Was) − 2:57
10. "Non è Francesca" (She is Not Francesca) − 3:56
11. "Io vivrò (senza te)" (I Will Live (Without You)) − 3:54
12. "Anna" (Anna) − 4:37

== Personnel ==
- Lucio Battisti – vocals, guitar
- Damiano Dattoli, Angel Salvador, Giorgio Piazza, Giovanni Tommaso, Frank Laugelli – bass
- Flavio Premoli, Dario Baldan Bembo, Demetrio Stratos, Gabriele Lorenzi, Mario Totaro, Renato Angiolini – keyboards, piano
- Alberto Radius, Franco Mussida, Andrea Sacchi – guitar
- Franz Di Cioccio, Leonello Bionda, Gianni Dall'Aglio, Sergio Panno – drums
- Pietruccio Montalbetti – harmonica (Dolce di giorno)
- Roberto Fassio – flute (Emozioni)
- I Musici – backing vocals
- I 4+4 by Nora Orlandi – backing vocals

== Charts ==
Initial chart performance for Emozioni
Chart (1970)	Peak position
Italian Albums (Musica e dischi)	1

2000 chart performance for Emozioni
Chart (2000)	Peak position
Italian Albums (FIMI)	2

2011 chart performance for Emozioni
Chart (2011)	Peak position
Italian Albums (FIMI)	17

2019 chart performance for Emozioni
Chart (2019)	Peak position
Italian Albums (FIMI)	9

2025 chart performance for Emozioni
Chart (2025)	Peak position
Italian Albums (FIMI)	61
Italian Physical Albums (FIMI)	20

== Certifications ==
Certifications for Emozioni
Region	Certification	Certified units/sales
Italy (FIMI) Sales from 2009	Platinum	50,000^{‡}
^{‡} Sales+streaming figures based on certification alone.
