= Lucio Battisti (album) =

Studio album by Lucio Battisti
- Released: 5 March 1969
- Genre: Pop
- Length: 39:04
- Label: Dischi Ricordi
- Producers: Lucio Battisti, Mogol

Lucio Battisti chronology
Lucio Battisti (1969)	Lucio Battisti Vol. 2 (1970)

Professional ratings
Review scores
Source	Rating
Allmusic	– album pick
Ondarock	6.5/10 stars

Lucio Battisti is the debut studio album by the Italian singer-songwriter Lucio Battisti. It was released in 5 March 1969 by Dischi Ricordi.

== Charts ==
Chart (2019–23)	Peak position
Italy (FIMI)	20

== The album ==
The album was Italy's third best selling album in 1969.

== Track listing ==
All lyrics written by Mogol; all music composed by Lucio Battisti, except where noted.

1. "Un'avventura" (An Adventure) − 3:10
2. "29 settembre" (29th September) − 3:30
3. "La mia canzone per Maria" (My Song for Maria) − 3:10
4. "Nel sole, nel vento, nel sorriso e nel pianto" (My Father Told Me) − 2:46
5. "Uno in più" (One More) − 3:42
6. "Non è Francesca" (She Can't Be Francesca) − 3:55
7. "Balla Linda" (Dance Linda) − 3:08
8. "Per una lira" (For a Lira) − 2:26
9. "Prigioniero del mondo" (Prisoner of the World) (Music by Carlo Donida) − 3:28
10. "Io vivrò (senza te)" (I Will Live (Without You)) − 3:54
11. "Nel cuore, nell'anima" (In the Heart, in the Soul) − 2:20
12. "Il vento" (The Wind) − 3:29

== Personnel ==
- Lucio Battisti – vocals, guitar, piano
- Giovanni Tommaso, Angel Salvador, Damiano Dattoli – bass
- Demetrio Stratos – organ
- Gianni Dall'Aglio, Franz Di Cioccio – drums
- Vince Tempera – piano
- Giorgio Benacchio, Dave Sumner – guitar
- Maurizio Vandelli – guitar, backing vocals
- Natale Massara – saxophone
- I 4 + 4 di Nora Orlandi – backing vocals
- Gian Piero Reverberi – arranger (Un'avventura, Non è Francesca)
- Detto Mariano – arranger (La mia canzone per Maria, Balla Linda, Prigioniero del mondo, Io vivrò (senza te)).
