= La sposa occidentale =

Studio album by Lucio Battisti
- Released: September 1990
- Genre: Synthpop; Pop
- Length: 44:30
- Label: CBS
- Producer: Greg Walsh

Lucio Battisti chronology
L'apparenza (1988)	La sposa occidentale (1990)	Cosa succederà alla ragazza (1992)

Alternative cover
- CD cover, with a zoom of the LP one

Professional ratings
Review scores
Source	Rating
Ondarock	– recommended

Potrebbe essere sera
Potrebbe essere sera, track #2

Timida molto audace
Timida molto audace, track #3

La sposa occidentale (The western bride) is the eighteenth studio album by the Italian singer-songwriter Lucio Battisti. It was released in September 1990 by CBS.

The album was Italy's 34th best selling album in 1990.

== Track listing ==
All lyrics written by Pasquale Panella, all music composed by Lucio Battisti.

1. "Tu non ti pungi più" (You Don't Prick Yourself Anymore) – 5:14
2. "Potrebbe essere sera" (It Could Be Evening) – 5:16
3. "Timida molto audace" (Shy and Very Bold) – 5:15
4. "La sposa occidentale" (The Western Bride) – 5:39
5. "Mi riposa" (It Rests Me) – 6:01
6. "I ritorni" (The Returns) – 5:28
7. "Alcune noncuranze" (Some Carelessnesses) – 6:36
8. "Campati in aria" (Far-fetched) – 4:57

== Charts ==
=== Weekly charts ===
Chart	Highest position
Italy (Musica e dischi)	3
