= Una giornata uggiosa =

Studio album by Lucio Battisti
- Released: January 1980
- Genre: Rock, pop
- Length: 44:07
- Label: Numero Uno – ZPLN 34084
- Producer: Geoff Westley

Lucio Battisti chronology
Una donna per amico (1978)	Una giornata uggiosa (1980)	E già (1982)

Professional ratings
Review scores
Source	Rating
Allmusic	3.5/5 stars
Ondarock	7/10 stars

Amore mio di provincia
Amore mio di provincia, track #6

Una giornata uggiosa
The title track, Una giornata uggiosa

Con il nastro rosa
The guitar solo of Con il nastro rosa, played by Phil Palmer

Una giornata uggiosa (A gloomy day) is the fourteenth studio album by the Italian singer and songwriter Lucio Battisti. It was released in January 1980 by Numero Uno.

The album was Italy's fifth best-selling album in 1980. It was also the last one to feature his collaboration with lyricist Mogol. It was recorded at the Townhouse Studios and CTS in London, and mixed at The Manor Studio in Oxfordshire between June and December 1979.

== Track listing ==
All lyrics written by Mogol, all music composed by Lucio Battisti.

1. "Il monolocale" (The Flat) – 4:50
2. "Arrivederci a questa sera" (See You This Evening) – 4:15
3. "Gelosa cara" (Jealous Darling) – 3:53
4. "Orgoglio e dignità" (Pride And Dignity) – 4:28
5. "Una vita viva" (An Alive Life) – 4:04
6. "Amore mio di provincia" (My Love of Province) – 4:12
7. "Questo amore" (This Love) – 4:18
8. "Perché non sei una mela" (Why Aren't You an Apple?) – 3:29
9. "Una giornata uggiosa" (A Gloomy Day) – 5:13
10. "Con il nastro rosa" (With The Pink Ribbon) – 5:03

== Personnel ==
- Guitar: Lucio Battisti, Phil Palmer, Ray Russell
- Bass: John Giblin, Les Hurdle, Alan Jones, Dave Markee, Paul Hart
- Keyboards: Geoff Westley
- Drums: Stuart Elliott
- Percussion: Frank Ricotti
- Saxophone: Mel Collins
- Trombone: Malcolm Griffiths
- Trumpet: Martin Drover

== Charts ==
=== Weekly charts ===
Chart	Highest position
Italy (Musica e dischi)	1
