= Lucio Battisti Vol. 4 =

Lucio Battisti vol. 4

Studio album by Lucio Battisti
- Released: 21 October 1971
- Genre: Pop; Progressive rock
- Length: 40:49
- Label: Dischi Ricordi
- Producer: Lucio Battisti, Mogol

Lucio Battisti chronology
| Amore e non amore (1971) | Lucio Battisti vol. 4 (1971) | Umanamente uomo: il sogno (1972) |

"Le tre verità"
"Le tre verità", track #1

"Pensieri e parole"
In the famous "Pensieri e parole" Battisti duets with himself. Lyrics sung by each of his voices represent respectively the character's thoughts ("pensieri") and words he speaks ("parole"), showing contrast between thought and actions.

Lucio Battisti vol. 4 is the fifth studio album by the Italian singer-songwriter Lucio Battisti. It was released on 21 October 1971 by Dischi Ricordi.

The album was Italy's 19th best selling album in 1972.

== Track listing ==
All lyrics written by Mogol, except where noted, all music composed by Lucio Battisti, except where noted.

1. "Le tre verità" (The Three Truths) – 4:55
2. "Dio mio no" (My God, No!) – 7:32
3. "Adesso sì" (Now Yes) (Lyrics and music by Sergio Endrigo) – 3:15
4. "La mia canzone per Maria" (My Song for Maria) – 3:13
5. "Luisa Rossi" – 2:48
6. "Pensieri e parole" (Thoughts and Words) – 3:55
7. "Mi ritorni in mente" (Wake Me I Am Dreaming) – 3:43
8. "Insieme a te sto bene" (Together with You I Feel Good) – 3:48
9. "29 settembre" (29th September) – 3:34
10. "Io vivrò (senza te)" (I Will Live (Without You)) – 4:02

== Charts ==
| Chart | Peak position |
|---|---|
| Italy | 3 |
