= Amarsi un po' =

Single by Lucio Battisti

from the album Io tu noi tutti
- B-side: "Sì, viaggiare"
- Released: March 1977
- Genre: Pop
- Length: 3:50
- Label: Numero Uno
- Songwriter(s): Lucio Battisti and Mogol,

Lucio Battisti singles chronology
"Ancora tu" (1976)	"Amarsi un po'" (1977)	"Una donna per amico" (1978)

Audio
- "Amarsi un po'" on YouTube

"Amarsi un po'" is a song composed by Lucio Battisti and Mogol, and performed by Lucio Battisti. It was released as a single in March 1977, with "Sì, viaggiare" as B-side. The single peaked at first place ten weeks on the Italian hit parade and was the most sold single of the year in Italy. The same year Battisti released an English version of the single for international markets, with the two songs renamed "To Feel in Love" and "Keep on Cruising" and with lyrics by Peter Powell. They were included in the album Images.

"Amarsi un po'" was covered by several artists, notably Mina, Ornella Vanoni, Nek. It also named a film, Amarsi un po' (1984), directed by Carlo Vanzina and starred by Claudio Amendola and Tahnee Welch. In 2017 the song named an episode in the second season of the TV series Master of None, which includes the song in the soundtrack; the song became "a touchstone for the whole season" according to Music supervisor Zach Cowie and the episode was nominated for an Emmy Award for Outstanding Music Supervision.

== Track listing ==
- 7" single
1. "Amarsi un po'" (Lucio Battisti, Mogol) – 5:07
2. "Sì, viaggiare" (Lucio Battisti, Mogol) – 4:10

== Charts ==
Chart (1977)	Peak position
Italy (Musica e dischi)	1
