= L'apparenza =

Studio album by Lucio Battisti
- Released: 7 October 1988
- Genre: Synthpop; Pop
- Length: 38:11
- Label: Numero Uno
- Producer: Robin Smith

Lucio Battisti chronology
Don Giovanni (1986)	L'apparenza (1988)	La sposa occidentale (1990)

Alternative cover
- CD cover, with a zoom of the LP one

Professional ratings
Review scores
Source	Rating
Ondarock	– recommended

A portata di mano
A portata di mano, track #1

Per altri motivi
Per altri motivi, track #5

L'apparenza (The appearance) is the seventeenth studio album by the Italian singer and songwriter Lucio Battisti. It was released on 7 October 1988 by Numero Uno.

The album was Italy's 17th best-selling album in 1988.

== Track listing ==
All lyrics were written by Pasquale Panella, all music compcompoowas sed by Lucio Battisti.

1. "A portata di mano" (Handy) – 5:17
2. "Specchi opposti" (Opposed Mirrors) – 4:19
3. "Allontanando" (Departing) – 4:41
4. "L'apparenza" (The Appearance) – 4:35
5. "Per altri motivi" (For Other Reasons) – 4:18
6. "Per nome" (By Name) – 5:23
7. "Dalle prime battute" (From The First Beats) – 4:57
8. "Lo scenario" (The Scenario) – 4:38

== Charts ==
=== Weekly charts ===
Chart	Highest position
Italy (Musica e dischi)	2
