= Images (Lucio Battisti album) =

- cover art by Al Vandenberg

Studio album by Lucio Battisti
- Released: September 1977
- Genre: Easy listening
- Length: 34:20
- Label: RCA Victor
- Producer: Lucio Battisti, Bones Howe, Joe Reisman

Lucio Battisti chronology
Io tu noi tutti (1977)	Images (1977)	Una donna per amico (1978)

"The only thing I've lost"
"The only thing I've lost", English language version of "Ho un anno di più"

Images is the twelfth studio album by the Italian singer and songwriter Lucio Battisti. It was released in September 1977 by RCA Victor.

The album is a collection of five songs from his previous album, Io tu noi tutti, and two of his classic songs ("Il mio canto libero" and "La canzone del sole"). All of the songs were translated into English by Peter Powell.

== Critical reception ==
American critics considered the record a failure. They cited Battisti's poor English skills, the flawed lyric translations and the disco-inspired arrangements (that, although pleasant, were not able to convey the spirit and the nuances of the original songs). Richard Williams, in Melody Maker, wrote that it sounded akin to a "watered-down Battisti".

== Track listing ==
All lyrics written by Mogol and Peter Powell, all music composed by Lucio Battisti.

1. "To Feel in Love" – 5:09
2. "A Song to Feel Alive" – 4:39
3. "The Only Thing I've Lost" – 5:02
4. "Keep on Cruising" – 4:36
5. "The Sun Song" – 5:17
6. "There's Never Been a Moment" – 4:47
7. "Only" – 4:47

== Personnel ==
- Guitar: Lucio Battisti, Dennis Budimir, Danny Ferguson, Ray Parker Jr.
- Bass: Scotty Edwards, Jim Hughart
- Keyboards: Michael Boddicker, Mike Melvoin
- Drums: Hal Blaine, Ed Greene

== Charts ==
Chart	Peak position
Italy (Musica e dischi)	11
