= E penso a te =

Song by Lucio Battisti

from the album Umanamente uomo: il sogno
- Language: Italian
- English title: And I Think of You
- Released: 24 April 1972
- Genre: Pop music
- Length: 4:15
- Composer: Lucio Battisti
- Lyricist: Mogol
- Producer: Lucio Battisti

Audio sample
- Sample with part of the third stanza and part of the final coda: file; help

"E penso a te" (English: And I think of you) is a song composed in 1970 by Lucio Battisti based on the lyrics by Mogol. Initially sung by Bruno Lauzi, it was subsequently re-recorded by numerous other artists. The most popular version remains the one which its author gave in 1972.

== The song ==
=== Meaning ===
The lyrics recount the nostalgic thoughts of a man who is in love with a somewhat distant woman. The song does not say who she is: she may be a former lover or wife, with whom the protagonist broke up, or maybe just a casually encountered woman he immediately fell in love with.

The protagonist, in any case, can't help but think of her constantly: the first and third stanza describe the actions of his daily life, each one followed by "... e penso a te" ("... and I think of you"), a line which highlights his obsession and his inability to fully enjoy what he is doing. During the day, the protagonist is at work, then comes home, and has a date with his current girlfriend, but keeps on thinking of his real love and fails to appear funny and involved; he finally goes to bed but can't sleep for the same reason. In the second stanza, he asks himself what she might be doing in this moment and bets she is searching for him too; but he has no true hope, because "the city is too big for two who, like us, are looking for each other".

The three stanzas are followed by an instrumental coda which represents the explosion of nostalgia. In Battisti's rendering, the coda has a final diminuendo in which all of the instruments dissolve into silence, leaving only the singer's voice, as to represent his loneliness in the world.

Mogol, who wrote the song's lyrics, told that the protagonist "still hopes in a casual encounter; the desire to see each other is such that there is the will for a miracle, for something impossible, opposed to the reality which seems impregnable. [...] It's a constant search. As if they were dogs: there's something that goes beyond reasoning, a kind of animal instinct".

=== Composition ===
The lyrics of the song were written in just 19 minutes during a drive on the Milano-Como Highway in which Mogol composed the lyrics almost entirely improvising while Lucio Battisti sang the melody line. The drive took place on a full-loaded tiny car; on board there were four people including Mario Lavezzi. According to some versions, Battisti was driving, according to others he was sitting in the passenger seat and Mogol himself drove the car.

When Battisti composed the song, he did not believe it could become successful: he said that "this one won't make it, doesn't have enough rhythm, it's weak". For this reason, he did not record the song himself but gave it to Bruno Lauzi, and even Lauzi's rendering was not given much attention (it was released in 1970 as B-side of another song written by Battisti and Mogol, named "Mary oh Mary"). The single was not a success and sold just over 30,000 copies. The song became a hit and a classic of Italian pop music only two years later, when Battisti sang the song himself and included it in the album Umanamente uomo: il sogno.

=== Legacy ===
According to a document published on 5 August 2009, the song was censured in Argentina by the National Reorganization Process with the newsletter 24-COMFER on 25 July 1978, along with songs by other internationally famous artists such as John Lennon, Queen, Joan Baez, The Doors, Pink Floyd, Donna Summer and Eric Clapton.

== Versions and albums ==
=== Bruno Lauzi ===
Published in 1970 as a B-side of a 45 record along with the song "Mary oh Mary", it was then included, in the same year, in the album Bruno Lauzi.

==== Musicians ====
- Franz Di Cioccio: drums
- Damiano Dattoli: bass
- Flavio Premoli: piano
- Andrea Sacchi: acoustic guitar
- Mario Lavezzi: guitar
- Gian Piero Reverberi: arrangement and orchestra conductor

=== Mina ===
In 1971, Mina sang it and include as an opening track on the album Mina. Subsequently, it was recorded in a live version on the album Dalla Bussola (1972).

==== Musicians ====
- Gianni Cazzola: drums
- Dario Baldan Bembo: organ
- Andrea Sacchi: electric and acoustic guitar
- Massimo Verardi: electric guitar
- Giancarlo Barigozzi: flute
- Al Korvin, Oscar Valdambrini, Fermo Lini, Giuliano Bernicchi: trumpets
- Sergio Almangano, Arturo Prestipino Giarritta: first violins
- Pino Presti: arrangement, orchestra conductor, bass

=== Lucio Battisti ===
The version sung by Lucio Battisti was published in 1972 in the album Umanamente uomo: il sogno and was subsequently republished in numerous anthologies, among which in 2004 in the anthology Le avventure di Lucio Battisti e Mogol.

==== Musicians ====
- Massimo Luca: electric guitar, acoustic guitar
- Eugenio Guarraia: electric guitar
- Angelo Salvador: electric bass
- Tony Cicco: drums e percussion
- Lucio Battisti: electric guitar, piano and wha wha
- Dario Baldan Bembo: organ, piano, keyboard
- Mario Lavezzi, Oscar Prudente, Tony Cicco, Babelle Douglas, Barbara Michelin e Sara: choir, violins, violas, violoncellos e ocarina
- Gian Piero Reverberi: director

==== Certifications ====
Certifications for "E penso a te" by Lucio Battisti
Region	Certification	Certified units/sales
Italy (FIMI)	Gold	50,000^{‡}
^{‡} Sales+streaming figures based on certification alone.

=== Tanita Tikaram ===
"And I Think of You (E penso a te)"
- Italian CD single

Single by Tanita Tikaram

from the album The Best of Tanita Tikaram
- A-side: "And I Think of You (E penso a te)"
- Released: 1996
- Recorded: 1996
- Genre: Folk rock
- Length: 4:18
- Label: East West
- Composer: Lucio Battisti
- Lyricists: Mogol, translated by Tanita Tikaram
- Producer: Rapino brothers

Tanita Tikaram singles chronology
"Yodelling Song" (1995)	"And I Think of You (E penso a te)" (1996)	"Stop Listening" (1998)

This English version of the Italian "E penso a te" ("And I Think of You") was initially an unreleased track on the compilation "The Best of Tanita Tikaram". Promotional singles of the song were sent to several radio stations. In 1998, the track appeared as a bonus track on the Japanese version of Tikaram's sixth studio album "The Cappuccino Songs". It was also released as a bonus track on the Italian edition of "The Cappuccino Songs", and released as a promotional single there in 1998. Joe McElderry covered the song for his fourth studio album, Here's What I Believe.

=== Track listing ===
1996 European Promo CD

1. "And I Think of You – E Penso A Te" (Radio Edit) (3:22)
2. "Twist in My Sobriety" (Tikaramp Radio) (4:23)
3. "And I Think of You – E Penso A Te" (Album Version) (4:18)

1998 Italian Promo CD

1. "And I Think of You – E Penso A Te" (Album Version) (4:18)

=== Other ===
There have been other recordings made by other artists; after the recording by Bruno Lauzi it was recorded by Raffaella Carrà who included the song in the eponymous LP and by Johnny Dorelli who included it as a B-side on the 45 record Love Story.

The song has been covered by numerous artists including Ornella Vanoni (1986 – Ornella &...), Mietta (2003 – Abbracciati e vivi / Sentirti / E penso a te), Raf (2005 – Tutto Raf), Antonio Spadaccino (2006 – Antonino), Fiorella Mannoia (2009 – Ho imparato a sognare) e Enrico Ruggeri.

On 21 June 2009 the song was covered by Fiorella Mannoia and Laura Pausini for the Abruzzo earthquake benefit concert Amiche per l'Abruzzo. The song was included in the eponymous DVD the following year.

In 1991 Enrico Rava produced an instrumental version in the tribute album "Ci ritorni in mente".

Mina and Iva Zanicchi have recorded two different versions in Spanish, Jean-François Michel in French and other in Spanish, Ajda Pekkan in Turkish, and Johnny Dorelli in English.

In 2012 Letizia Gambi recorded an English/ Italian version "And I think of You/ E penso a te" on her album Introducing Letizia Gambi with Patrice Rushen on piano and Lenny White on drums.
