= Lucio Battisti, la batteria, il contrabbasso, eccetera =

Studio album by Lucio Battisti
- Released: January 1976
- Studio: Studio Il Mulino (Milan)
- Genre: Disco music Pop
- Length: 42:57
- Label: Numero Uno
- Producer: Lucio Battisti, Mogol

Lucio Battisti chronology
Anima latina (1974)	Lucio Battisti, la batteria, il contrabbasso, eccetera (1976)	Io tu noi tutti (1977)

Professional ratings
Review scores
Source	Rating
Allmusic	3/5 stars
Ondarock	7.5/10 stars

Ancora tu
Ancora tu shows a balanced commixture of Italian pop's melodiousness and disco music's rhythms

Dove arriva quel cespuglio
B-side of the single excerpted from the album

Il veliero
Il veliero, the most obvious example of disco music in the album

Lucio Battisti, la batteria, il contrabbasso eccetera (Lucio Battisti, the drums, the double bass etc.) is the tenth studio album by the Italian singer-songwriter Lucio Battisti. It was released in January 1976 by Numero Uno.

== The album ==
The album was Italy's third best selling album in 1976.

== Charts ==
=== Weekly charts ===
Chart (1976)	Highest position
Italy (Musica e dischi)	1

Chart (2007–19)	Peak position
Italy (FIMI)	44

== Track listing ==
All lyrics written by Mogol, all music composed by Lucio Battisti, except where noted.

1. "Ancora tu" (Baby It's You) – 4:45
2. "Un uomo che ti ama" (A Man Who Loves You) – 6:09
3. "La compagnia" (The Companionship) (Lyrics by Mogol, music by Carlo Donida) – 5:51
4. "Io ti venderei" (I Would Sell You) – 4:34
5. "Dove arriva quel cespuglio" (Where That Bush Is) – 4:13
6. "Respirando" (Breathing) – 4:58
7. "No dottore" (No, Doctor!) – 5:45
8. "Il veliero" (The Sailing Ship) – 6:01
9. "Ancora tu (ripresa)" (Baby It's You (reprise)) – 0:38
