= Una donna per amico =

Studio album by Lucio Battisti
- Released: December 1978
- Venue: The Manor, Audio International Studios
- Genre: Pop
- Length: 44:34
- Label: Numero Uno
- Producer: Geoff Westley

Lucio Battisti chronology
Images (1977)	Una donna per amico (1978)	Una giornata uggiosa (1980)

Professional ratings
Review scores
Source	Rating
AllMusic	3.5/5 stars
Ondarock	6.5/10 stars

Nessun dolore
Nessun dolore, the B-side of the single

Una donna per amico
The title track, Una donna per amico

Una donna per amico (idiomatically “A woman for a friend”) is the thirteenth studio album by the Italian singer and songwriter Lucio Battisti. It was released in December 1978 by Numero Uno.

The album was Italy's fourth best-selling album in 1978.

It appears at 3rd place in the 100 greatest Italian albums of all time list published in 2012 by Italian edition of Rolling Stone magazine.

The album was recorded at The Manor Studio in Oxfordshire and London with producer Geoff Westley and session musicians.

== Track listing ==
All lyrics written by Mogol, all music composed by Lucio Battisti.

1. "Prendila così" (Take It As It Comes) – 7:48
2. "Donna selvaggia donna" (Lady) – 4:39
3. "Aver paura d'innamorarsi troppo" (Afraid of Falling) – 5:49
4. "Perché no" (Day to Day) – 5:44
5. "Nessun dolore" (Pain is Gone) – 6:15
6. "Una donna per amico" (A Woman as a Friend) – 5:19
7. "Maledetto gatto" (Damned Cat) – 4:21
8. "Al cinema" (Let's Go See a Movie) – 4:36

== Personnel ==
- Guitar: Lucio Battisti, Pip Williams
- Bass: Dave Olney, Paul Westwood
- Keyboards: Geoff Westley
- Drums: Gerry Conway
- Percussion: Frank Ricotti
- Backing Vocals: Geoff Westley

== Charts ==
=== Weekly charts ===
Chart (1978)	Highest position
Italy (Musica e dischi)	1

Chart (2007–11)	Peak position
Italy (FIMI)	29

== Sales ==
Sales for Una donna per amico
Region	Sales
Italy	700,000
