= Hegel (album) =

Studio album by Lucio Battisti
- Released: 29 September 1994
- Genre: Pop; Eurodance
- Length: 38:40
- Label: Numero Uno
- Producer: Andy Duncan

Lucio Battisti chronology
Cosa succederà alla ragazza (1992)	Hegel (1994)

Professional ratings
Review scores
Source	Rating
Ondarock	7/10 stars

La bellezza riunita
La bellezza riunita, track #4

"Stanze come questa"
"Stanze come questa", track #6

Hegel is the 20th and final studio album by the Italian singer-songwriter Lucio Battisti. It was released on 29 September 1994 by Numero Uno.

The album was Italy's 68th best selling album in 1994.

== Track listing ==
All lyrics written by Pasquale Panella, all music composed by Lucio Battisti.

1. "Almeno l'inizio" (At Least The Beginning) – 4:57
2. "Hegel" – 5:15
3. "Tubinga" (Tübingen) – 4:54
4. "La bellezza riunita" (Beauty Put Together) – 5:07
5. "La moda nel respiro" (The Fashion In The Breath)– 4:22
6. "Stanze come questa" (Rooms Like This One) – 4:38
7. "Estetica" (Aesthetics) – 5:11
8. "La voce del viso" (The Voice Of The Face) – 4:13

== Charts ==
=== Weekly charts ===
Chart	Highest position
Italy (Musica e dischi)	5
