= La canzone del sole (song) =

Single by Lucio Battisti
- B-side: "Anche per te"
- Released: November 1971
- Genre: Pop
- Label: Numero Uno
- Songwriter(s): Lucio Battisti, Mogol

Lucio Battisti singles chronology
"Le tre verità" (1971)	"La canzone del sole" (1971)	"Elena no" (1972)

Audio
- "La canzone del sole" on YouTube

"La canzone del sole" (transl. "The Sun Song") is a 1971 song composed by Lucio Battisti (music) and Mogol (lyrics), arranged by Gian Piero Reverberi and performed by Lucio Battisti.

== Composition ==
The song was the first composition for the newly created Battisti-Mogol label Numero Uno. The lyrics counterpoint the sweet memories of a youthful summer love and the daily routine of the mature love relationship.

== Cover versions ==
Artists who covered the song include Mina, José Feliciano, Fiorello, Luca Barbarossa, Formula 3. Luca Carboni's song "Farfallina" was inspired by the song's lyrics.

== Track listing ==
No.	Title	Length
1.	"La canzone del sole"	5:23
2.	"Anche per te"	4:30

== Charts ==
Chart performance for "La canzone del sole"
Chart (1971–1972)	Peak position
Italy (Discografia internazionale)	1
Italy (Musica e dischi)	1

== Certifications ==
Region	Certification	Certified units/sales
Italy (FIMI) sales from January 2009	Platinum	100,000^{‡}
^{‡} Sales+streaming figures based on certification alone.
