= Battisti =

Battisti is a surname of Italian origin. The name refers to:

- Carlo Battisti (1882–1977), Italian linguist and actor
- Cesare Battisti (born 1954), Italian writer, former member of Armed Proletarians for Communism, also a convicted murderer in Italy, currently a refugee in Brazil
- Cesare Battisti (politician) (1875–1916), Italian-Austrian irredentist; hanged by the Austro-Hungarian regime during World War I
- David Battisti (born 1956), American atmospheric scientist
- Frank J. Battisti (1922–1994), American jurist on the United States Circuit Court
- Gianfranco Battisti (born 1962), Italian corporate executive
- Leda Battisti (born 1971), Italian singer-songwriter
- Lucio Battisti (1943–1998), Italian singer-songwriter and composer
- Mount Battisti, a mountain in Canada
