= Cosa succederà alla ragazza =

Studio album by Lucio Battisti
- Released: October 1992
- Genre: Pop, rap, techno
- Length: 40:22
- Label: Columbia
- Producer: Andy Duncan

Lucio Battisti chronology
La sposa occidentale (1990)	Cosa succederà alla ragazza (1992)	Hegel (1994)

Professional ratings
Review scores
Source	Rating
Ondarock	7/10 stars
Sentireascoltare	(7.8/10)

"Cosa farà di nuovo"
Cosa farà di nuovo, one of the most obvious examples of rap in the album

"Così gli dei sarebbero"
Così gli dei sarebbero, track #7

Cosa succederà alla ragazza (What will happen to the girl) is the nineteenth studio album by the Italian singer-songwriter Lucio Battisti. It was released in October 1992 by Columbia Records.

The album was Italy's 57th best selling album in 1992.

== Track listing ==
All lyrics written by Pasquale Panella, all music composed by Lucio Battisti.

No.	Title	Length
1.	"Cosa succederà alla ragazza" (What Will Happen To The Girl?)	5:00
2.	"Tutte le pompe" (All The Pumps)	4:48
3.	"Ecco i negozi" (Here Are The Shops)	5:03
4.	"La metro eccetera" (The Metro Etcetera)	4:14
5.	"I sacchi della posta" (The Mail Bags)	5:35
6.	"Però il rinoceronte" (However The Rhino)	5:51
7.	"Così gli dei sarebbero" (So Gods Would Be)	4:53
8.	"Cosa farà di nuovo" (What Will She Do Again)	4:56

== Charts ==
=== Weekly charts ===
Chart	Highest position
Italy (Musica e dischi)	5
