= Hegel (surname) =

Hegel is a German surname. Notable people with the surname include:

- Chris Hegel (born 2000), German politician
- Frederik Hegel (1817–1887), Danish bookseller and publisher
- Georg Wilhelm Friedrich Hegel (1770–1831), German philosopher
- Idora Hegel (born 1983), Croatian former figure skater
- Karl von Hegel (1813–1901), German historian
- Rob Hegel (born 1948), American singer-songwriter
- Robert E. Hegel (born 1943), American sinologist

== See also ==
- Hegel (disambiguation)
- Engel (surname)
