= Rubinacci (disambiguation) =

Rubinacci is an Italian luxury clothing company. It may also refer to:

== Surname ==
=== People ===
- Jack Rubinacci (born 31 August 1975) is an Anglo-Italian musical artist
- Leopoldo Rubinacci (1903–1969) Italian politician and lawyer

=== Fictional characters ===
- Rossella Rubinacci, main character in the 1962 Italian film A Girl... and a Million
