= Don Giovanni (disambiguation) =

Don Giovanni is a 1787 opera with music by Wolfgang Amadeus Mozart.

Don Giovanni may also refer to:

- Don Juan, a legendary, fictional libertine, basis of the opera
- Don Giovanni Tenorio, a 1787 opera by Giuseppe Gazzaniga
- Don Giovanni (album), a 1986 album by Lucio Battisti
- Don Juan (1955 film), an Austrian opera-film
- Don Giovanni (1970 film), an Italian comedy-drama film
- Don Giovanni (1979 film), a French-Italian film
- Don Giovanni Records, an independent record label
