= Una donna per amico (song) =

Single by Lucio Battisti

from the album Una donna per amico
- B-side: "Nessun dolore"
- Released: October 1978
- Genre: Pop
- Length: 5:19
- Label: Numero Uno
- Songwriters: Lucio Battisti and Mogol

Lucio Battisti singles chronology
"Amarsi un po'" (1977)	"Una donna per amico" (1978)	"Una giornata uggiosa" (1980)

Audio
- "Una donna per amico" on YouTube

"Una donna per amico" (pronounced [una ˈdɔnna per aˈmiːko]; Italian for 'A Woman as a Friend') is a song composed by Lucio Battisti and Mogol, and performed by Lucio Battisti. It was released as a single in October 1978, with "Nessun dolore" as B-side. The single peaked at first place fourteen consecutive weeks on the Italian hit parade between November 1978 and February 1979. It was the second most sold single of the year in Italy, behind Bee Gees' "Stayin' Alive".

At the 2006 Winter Olympics Opening Ceremony, "Una donna per amico" was played during the entrance of the Italian home team. Miss Italia, Edelfa Chiara Masciotta, carried the placard wearing a Moschino-designed dress. The Italian flag, called il Tricolore, was carried by then 19-year-old figure skater Carolina Kostner.

"Una donna per amico" was covered by several artists, including Rosario Fiorello and the band Sugarfree. It named a 1998 television series starring Elisabetta Gardini and a 2014 film directed by Giovanni Veronesi and starring Fabio De Luigi and Laetitia Casta.

== Nessun dolore ==
"Nessun dolore"

Song by Lucio Battisti

from the album Una donna per amico
- Released: October 1978
- Genre: Dance-pop
- Length: 6:15
- Label: Numero Uno
- Songwriters: Lucio Battisti and Mogol
- Producer: Geoff Westley

The B-side "Nessun dolore" (pronounced [nesˈsun doˈloːre]; transl. 'No pain (at all)') was covered by Italian singer Giorgia on her eponymous debut album (1994); it was later also included in her compilation Spirito libero - Viaggi di voce 1992-2008. It was also covered by Italian singer Mina on her 1987 album Rane combattenti; Russian singer Svetlana Tchernykh (Светлана) recorded a Russian language version of the song, titled "Я парня себе выбрала в подруги" (album Черных поёт Баттисти, 2005).

== Track listing ==
- 7" single - ZBN 7110
1. "Una donna per amico'" (Lucio Battisti, Mogol) – 5:19
2. "Nessun dolore" (Lucio Battisti, Mogol) – 6:15

== Charts ==
Chart	Peak position
Italy (Musica e dischi)	1

== Certifications ==
Region	Certification	Certified units/sales
Italy (FIMI) Sales since 2009	Gold	50,000^{‡}
^{‡} Sales+streaming figures based on certification alone.
