= Hegel (disambiguation) =

Georg Wilhelm Friedrich Hegel (1770–1831) was a German philosopher.

Hegel may also refer to:

== People ==
- Hegel (surname)

== Other uses ==
- Hegel (album), a 1994 album by Italian singer-songwriter Lucio Battisti
- 14845 Hegel, a minor planet
- Hegel Prize, a humanities award by the city of Stuttgart

== See also ==
- Hagel, a surname
