= Mi ritorni in mente =

Single by Lucio Battisti

from the album Emozioni
- B-side: "7 e 40"
- Released: 14 October 1969
- Genre: Pop; R&B
- Label: Dischi Ricordi
- Songwriter(s): Lucio Battisti, Mogol

Lucio Battisti singles chronology
| "Acqua azzurra, acqua chiara" (1969) | "Mi ritorni in mente" (1969) | "Fiori rosa fiori di pesco" (1970) |

Audio
- "Mi ritorni in mente" on YouTube

"Mi ritorni in mente" (lit. 'You come back to my mind') is a 1969 song composed by Lucio Battisti (music) and Mogol (lyrics) and performed by Lucio Battisti.

The song was composed developing a "Non chiederò la carità", an old unreleased song composed by Battisti at the time he was a member of the group I Campioni. It was a last minute choice for the single, replacing "7 e 40" as A-side and postponing the release of the originally conceived B-side "Una".

In 1971, the band Love Affair covered the song in English with the title "Wake Me I Am Dreaming".

== Track listing ==
| No. | Title | Length |
|---|---|---|
| 1. | "Mi ritorni in mente" | 3:41 |
| 2. | "7 e 40" | 3:32 |

== Charts ==
| Chart (1969–1970) | Peak position |
|---|---|
| Italy (Musica e dischi) | 1 |
