= Emozioni (song) =

Single by Lucio Battisti

from the album Emozioni
- B-side: "Anna"
- Released: 15 October 1970
- Genre: Pop
- Label: Dischi Ricordi
- Songwriter(s): Lucio Battisti, Mogol

Lucio Battisti singles chronology
"Fiori rosa fiori di pesco" (1970)	"Emozioni" (1970)	"Pensieri e parole" (1971)

Audio
- "Emozioni" on YouTube

"Emozioni" (lit. 'Emotions') is a 1970 song composed by Lucio Battisti (music) and Mogol (lyrics), arranged by Gian Piero Reverberi and performed by Lucio Battisti.

== Composition ==
The song's composition was inspired by a long and much-publicized Battisti's and Mogol's horseback riding trip from Milan to Rome. According to Battisti, it 'expressed the sense of discovery, of wonder, of freedom that Mogol and I found venturing through meadows, hills, and rivers, as if we were seeing nature for the first time.'

== Release ==
Originally it was the B-side of "Anna", with Battisti eventually deciding to swap the two songs.

== Cover versions ==
Artists who covered the song include Gianni Morandi, Mina, Patty Pravo, Marcella Bella, Fred Bongusto, Formula 3, Maurizio Vandelli.

== Track listing ==
No.	Title	Length
1.	"Emozioni"	4:47
2.	"Anna"	4:37

== Charts ==
Chart performance for "Emozioni"
Chart (1970)	Peak position
Italy (Musica e dischi)	13

Chart performance for "Anna"
Chart (1970–1971)	Peak position
Italy (Discografia internazionale)	1
Italy (Musica e dischi)	1

== Certifications ==
Region	Certification	Certified units/sales
Italy (FIMI) sales from 2009	2× Platinum	200,000^{‡}
^{‡} Sales+streaming figures based on certification alone.
