= Massimo Luca =

Italian guitarist, composer and record producer (1950)

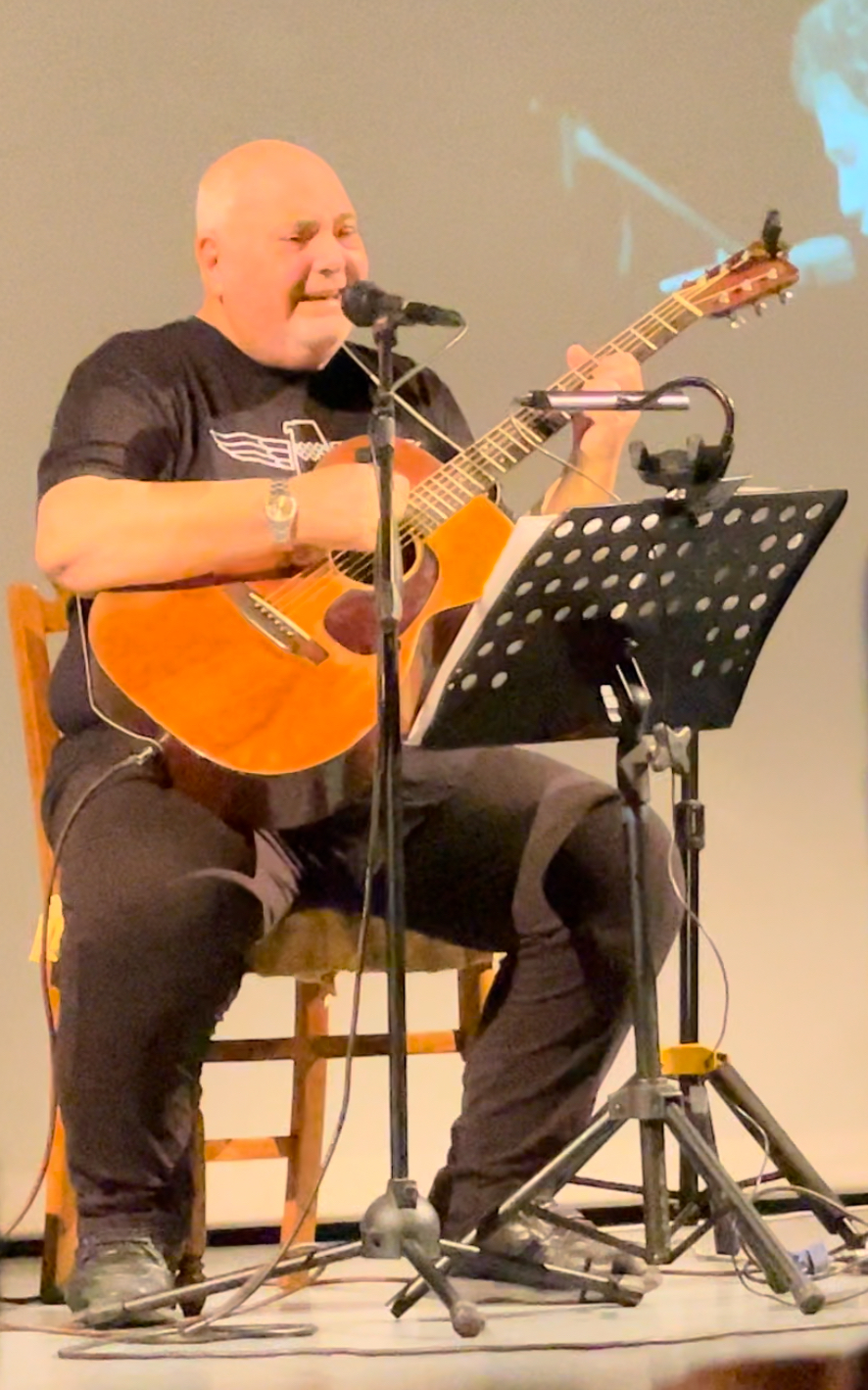
- Luca in 2024
- Born: 4 January 1950 (age 76); Santa Margherita Ligure, Italy
- Occupations: Guitarist; composer; singer-songwriter; record producer
- Years active: 1970s–present

Massimo Luca (born 4 January 1950) is an Italian guitarist, composer, singer-songwriter and record producer.

== Life and career ==
Born in the Santa Margherita Ligure, Luca started his career as a session musician in the early 1970s, and became first known thanks to his collaboration with Lucio Battisti in the best-selling albums Umanamente uomo: il sogno, Il mio canto libero and Anima latina. Other notable artists he collaborated with include Mina, Paolo Conte, Loredana Bertè, Fabrizio De André, Francesco Guccini, Angelo Branduardi and Fabio Concato. In 1974, he became a member of the short-lived group Data, with Umberto Tozzi and Damiano Dattoli. In 1979, he got his first hit as a composer with "Goldrake", the Italian theme song of the anime series UFO Robot Grendizer.

In 1980, Luca made his debut as a singer-songwriter with the album Massimo Luca. He later became a producer, getting his major success with Destinazione paradiso, the debut album of Gianluca Grignani. As a producer, he also contributed to launch the careers of Biagio Antonacci and Paola & Chiara. He composed and produced "Senza te o con te", the Annalisa Minetti's 1998 song which won the 48th edition of the Sanremo Music Festival.
