= E già =

Studio album by Lucio Battisti
- Released: September 1982
- Genre: Synthpop
- Length: 37:08
- Label: Numero Uno
- Producer: Greg Walsh

Lucio Battisti chronology
Una giornata uggiosa (1980)	E già (1982)	Don Giovanni (1986)

Professional ratings
Review scores
Source	Rating
Ondarock	6/10 stars

Windsurf windsurf
The second song on the album is about Windsurf, at the time Battisti's new hobby

Registrazione
Registrazione is about the pleasure of recording music. In this passage Battisti openly credits Mick Jagger, The Rolling Stones, Beatles, Beach Boys, Paul McCartney, Ray Charles and Bob Dylan as his main influences.

E già
The title track, E già

E già is the fifteenth studio album by the Italian singer and songwriter Lucio Battisti. It was released in September 1982 by Numero Uno.

The album was Italy's 14th best selling album in 1982.

The pictures for the cover were taken by Gered Mankowitz at Mother Ivy's Bay in Cornwall, UK. The smiles on the cover were drawn by Battisti's son, Luca, who at the time was 9.

== Track listing ==
All lyrics written by Velezia (Grazia Letizia Veronese), all music composed by Lucio Battisti.

1. "Scrivi il tuo nome" (Write Down Your Name) – 2:25
2. "Mistero" (Mystery) – 3:05
3. "Windsurf windsurf" – 2:47
4. "Rilassati ed ascolta" (Relax and Listen) – 3:20
5. "Non sei più solo" (You're Not Alone Anymore) – 2:46
6. "Straniero" (Foreigner) – 4:43
7. "Registrazione" (Recording) – 2:26
8. "La tua felicità" (Your Happiness) – 2:18
9. "Hi - fi" – 2:44
10. "Slow motion" – 3:56
11. "Una montagna" (A Mountain) – 3:40
12. "E già" (And Already) – 2:55

== Charts ==
=== Weekly charts ===
Chart	Highest position
Italy (Musica e dischi)	1
