= Umanamente uomo: il sogno =

Studio album by Lucio Battisti
- Released: April 1972
- Genre: Pop/rock
- Length: 33:57
- Label: Numero Uno
- Producer: Lucio Battisti

Lucio Battisti chronology
Lucio Battisti vol. 4 (1971)	Umanamente uomo: il sogno (1972)	Il mio canto libero (1972)

Professional ratings
Review scores
Source	Rating
Allmusic	4/5 stars
Ondarock	6.5/10 stars

E penso a te
E penso a te, one of Battisti's most popular songs

Umanamente uomo: il sogno (Humanly man: the dream) is the sixth studio album by the Italian singer-songwriter Lucio Battisti. It was released in April 1972 by Numero Uno.

The album was Italy's second best-selling album in 1972.

== Charts ==
=== Weekly charts ===
Chart (1972–2007)	Highest position
Italy (Musica e dischi)	1

Chart (2007–19)	Peak position
Italy (FIMI)	31

== Track listing ==
All lyrics written by Mogol, all music composed by Lucio Battisti.

1. "I giardini di marzo" (The March Gardens) – 5:33
2. "Innocenti evasioni" (Innocent Evasions) – 3:48
3. "E penso a te" (And I Think Of You) – 4:18
4. "Umanamente uomo: il sogno" (Humanly Man: The Dream) – 3:24
5. "Comunque bella" (Though Beautiful) – 3:53
6. "Il leone e la gallina" (The Lion and the Hen) – 3:32
7. "Sognando e risognando" (Dreaming and Dreaming Again) – 5:17
8. "Il fuoco" (The Fire) – 4:10
