= Don Giovanni (album) =

Studio album by Lucio Battisti
- Released: March 1986
- Genre: Italian popular music Synthpop
- Length: 36:04
- Label: Numero Uno
- Producer: Greg Walsh

Lucio Battisti chronology
E già (1982)	Don Giovanni (1986)	L'apparenza (1988)

Alternative cover
- CD cover, with a zoom of the LP one

Professional ratings
Review scores
Source	Rating
Allmusic	3.5/5 stars
Ondarock	– recommended

Fatti un pianto
Fatti un pianto, track No. 2

Madre pennuta
Madre pennuta, track No. 5

Don Giovanni is the sixteenth studio album by the Italian singer-songwriter Lucio Battisti. Nearly four years in its making, it was released in March 1986 by Battisti's Numero Uno label and was later re-released by Sony BMG. In stylistic terms, it features an avant-garde blend of an almost minimalist sound, featuring synthpop inspired electronics, with classic Italian popular music. The title of the album alludes to Mozart's famous work Don Giovanni.

== Track listing ==
All lyrics written by Pasquale Panella, all music composed by Lucio Battisti.

1. "Le cose che pensano" (The thinking things) – 4:26
2. "Fatti un pianto" (Have a good cry) – 4:54
3. "Il doppio del gioco" (Betting the double) – 4:14
4. "Madre pennuta" (Feathered mother) – 4:28
5. "Equivoci amici" (Questionable Friends) – 3:53
6. "Don Giovanni" – 3:40
7. "Che vita ha fatto" (What kind of life did he live?) – 4:01
8. "Il diluvio" (The Flood) – 6:24

== Personnel ==
- Guitar: Ray Russell
- Keyboards: Robyn Smith
- Drums: Greg Walsh
- Saxophone: Phil Todd
- Double Bass: Andy Pask
- Harp: Skaila Kanga
- Violin: Gavyn Wright
- Trumpet: Guy Barker, Ted Hunter

== Charts ==
=== Weekly charts ===
Chart	Highest position
Italy (Musica e dischi)	1

== See also ==
- Don Giovanni
- Italian popular music
