= Ancora tu =

Single by Lucio Battisti

from the album Lucio Battisti, la batteria, il contrabbasso, eccetera
- B-side: "Dove arriva quel cespuglio"
- Released: 1976
- Label: Numero Uno
- Songwriter(s): Lucio Battisti, Mogol

Lucio Battisti singles chronology
"La collina dei ciliegi" (1973)	"Ancora tu" (1976)	"Amarsi un po'" (1977)

Audio
- "Ancora tu" on YouTube

"Ancora tu" (lit. 'You again') is a 1976 song composed by Lucio Battisti (music) and Mogol (lyrics) and performed by Lucio Battisti.

== Overview ==
The song realistically recounts in dialogue form the meeting of two ex-lovers and the rekindling of their passion. It was composed during a journey in the United States, while travelling in a car on Interstate 5, and had the working title "San Diego Freeway". Ernesto Assante wrote about it: '[it's] difficult to search for verses, refrains, bridges, in a marvellous broken and danceable rhythm in which funky and disco are so sophisticated and elegant as to seem elusive, and the melody evolves in a crescendo that allows Battisti to sing at his best, up to his by then classical falsetto'.

== Other versions ==
Battisti recorded the song in English as "Baby, It's You" and in Spanish as "De nuevo tú". Artists who covered the song include Mina, Marcella Bella, Paola Turci, Formula 3, Jack Savoretti, Róisín Murphy, T. Storm Hunter, Cristiano Malgioglio with Maria Schneider, Tiziana Rivale. It was sampled by Sangue Misto in "Manca Mone" and by Dargen D'Amico in "Bere una cosa".

== Track listing ==
No.	Title	Length
1.	"Ancora tu"	4:45
2.	"Dove arriva quel cespuglio"	4:13

== Charts ==
Chart (1976)	Peak position
Italy (Musica e dischi)	1

== Certifications ==
Region	Certification	Certified units/sales
Italy (FIMI) Sales since 2009	Gold	35,000^{‡}
^{‡} Sales+streaming figures based on certification alone.
