= I giardini di marzo =

Single by Lucio Battisti

from the album Umanamente uomo: il sogno
- B-side: "Comunque bella"
- Released: 24 April 1972
- Genre: Pop
- Label: Numero Uno
- Songwriter(s): Lucio Battisti, Mogol

Lucio Battisti singles chronology
"Elena no" (1972)	"I giardini di marzo" (1972)	"Il mio canto libero" (1972)

Audio
- "I giardini di marzo" on YouTube

"I giardini di marzo" (lit. 'The Gardens in March') is a 1972 song composed by Lucio Battisti (music) and Mogol (lyrics), arranged by Gian Piero Reverberi and performed by Lucio Battisti.

The song is built in a crescendo, with minimalist music and a trembling, whispering voice at the start, followed by a gradual melodic and orchestral overture, a structure which reflects the lyrics, which initially feature a dark portrait of depression which progressively opens up to hope.

Battisti recorded the song in French "Les jardins de septembre" and in German as "Gärten im März". Artists who covered the song include Mina, Vicky Leandros, Ligabue, Richard Clayderman, Eugenio Finardi, Formula 3, Vasilis Papakonstantinou.

== Track listing ==
No.	Title	Length
1.	"I giardini di marzo"	5:33
2.	"Comunque bella"	3:53

== Charts ==
Initial chart performance for "I giardini di marzo"
Chart (1972)	Peak position
Italy (Discografia internazionale)	1
Italy (Musica e dischi)	1

2019 chart performance for "I giardini di marzo"
Chart (2019)	Peak position
Italy (FIMI)	80

== Certifications ==
Region	Certification	Certified units/sales
Italy (FIMI) certification for digital sales and streaming since January 2009	Platinum	100,000^{‡}
^{‡} Sales+streaming figures based on certification alone.
