= Tony Cicco =

Italian musician (born 1949)

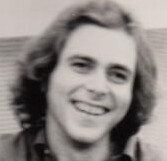
- Cicco in 1977
- Born: 28 November 1949 (age 76); Naples, Italy
- Occupations: Drummer; Singer-songwriter
- Musical career
- Genres: Rock; Pop; Art rock
- Instrument: drums
- Member of: Formula 3

Antonio "Tony" Cicco (born 28 November 1949), also known as Cico and Toni Cicco, is an Italian drummer and singer-songwriter. He is best known as the vocalist and drummer of the group Formula 3.

== Life and career ==
Born in Naples in a family of musicians, Cicco started his career performing in several local bands. In 1969, he started collaborating with Lucio Battisti, serving as drummer in most of his works of the time, and the same year, together with Gabriele Lorenzi and Alberto Radius, he formed the band Formula 3, with whom under the production of Battisti he had significant success for a lustre.

After the disbandment of Formula 3, Cicco adopted the stage name "Cico" and made his solo debut with Notte, an album which reprised the band's style, while starting from his 1976 album E mia madre his style became closer to the cantautori tradition. In the following years Cicco also started working as a composer for other artists, notably Loredana Bertè and Fiorella Mannoia. As a session man, he took part in several jazz and fusion productions, and his collaborations include Pino Daniele, Wynton Marsalis, Steve Gadd, Mino Cinélu, Eddie Gomez. Following his last solo album Pà, in 1990 he joined the Formula 3 reunion.

== Solo discography ==
- 1974 - Notte (CBS, 69085)
- 1975 - E mia madre (CBS, 69205)
- 1976 - La gente dice (CBS, 81472)
- 1978 - Macchine Macchinette (EMI Italiana, 3C 064-18344)
- 1987 - E mò parlamm 'e musica (RCA Italiana, PL 71496)
- 1989 - Pa' (RCA Italiana, PL 75038)
- 1997 - Voce e batteria (NAR International, SP 61112)
- 2004 - Ogni volta che vedo il mare (NAR International, NAR 12404-2)
