= Acqua azzurra, acqua chiara =

Single by Lucio Battisti

from the album Emozioni
- B-side: "Dieci ragazze"
- Released: 28 March 1969
- Genre: Pop; blues; R&B
- Label: Dischi Ricordi
- Songwriter(s): Lucio Battisti, Mogol

Lucio Battisti singles chronology
| "Un'avventura" (1969) | "Acqua azzurra, acqua chiara" (1969) | "Mi ritorni in mente" (1969) |

Audio
- "Acqua azzurra, acqua chiara" on YouTube

"Acqua azzurra, acqua chiara" (lit. 'Blue water, clear water') is a 1969 song composed by Lucio Battisti (music) and Mogol (lyrics) and performed by Lucio Battisti.

The song premiered in the Renzo Arbore's television show Speciale per voi, where Arbore convinced Battisti and Mogol to prefer the song as A-side of the single instead of "Dieci ragazze". The song ranked third in the 1969 Cantagiro, behind Massimo Ranieri's "Rose Rosse" and Camaleonti's "Viso d'angelo", and it eventually won the Festivalbar.

Artists who covered the song include Mina, Raffaella Carrà, Marcella Bella, Formula 3, Andrea Mingardi.

== Track listing ==
| No. | Title | Length |
|---|---|---|
| 1. | "Acqua azzurra, acqua chiara" | 3:38 |
| 2. | "Dieci ragazze" | 2:59 |

== Charts ==
Chart performance for "Acqua azzurra, acqua chiara"
| Chart (1969) | Peak position |
|---|---|
| Italy (Musica e dischi) | 3 |

== Certifications and sales ==
Certifications for "Acqua azzurra, acqua chiara"
| Region | Certification | Certified units/sales |
|---|---|---|
| Italy (FIMI) sales since 2009 | Platinum | 100,000^{‡} |
^{‡} Sales+streaming figures based on certification alone.
