= Io e te da soli =

Single by Mina
- Language: Italian
- B-side: "Credi"
- Released: November 1970
- Recorded: 22–30 October 1970
- Genre: Progressive pop; orchestral pop; jazz
- Length: 4:32
- Label: PDU
- Composer: Lucio Battisti
- Lyricist: Mogol

Mina singles chronology
"Ma se ghe penso" (1970)	"Io e te da soli" (1970)	"Una donna, una storia" (1971)

"Io e te da soli" (English: You and I Alone) is a song by Italian singer Mina. The song was written by Mogol and Lucio Battisti.

The song was released as a single in November 1970 by PDU. It debuted at number fifteen and peaked at number two on the Italian singles chart five weeks later. The single was also released in France and Japan. Mina also recorded the song in French ("L'amour est mort"; adapted lyrics by Jacques Demarny) and Spanish ("Que nos separemos"; adapted lyrics by Augusto 'C. Mapel' Algueró). The French version was released in France as a single, and the Spanish version was included in the Spanish-language compilation Amor mio (Mina canta en español), released in Spain and Latin America in 1972.

The song was never included on a studio album, it appears for the first time in the compilation Del mio meglio (1971). Mina performed the song as part of the medley for the live album Dalla Bussola (1972).

The B-side was the song "Credi", written by Paolo Limiti and Mario Nobile. The song was translated into French by Jacques Demarny and also used as a B-side on the single "L'amour est mort".

== Personnel ==
- Mina – vocals
- Gian Piero Reverberi – arrangement
- Franz Di Cioccio – drums
- Franco Mussida – guitar

== Charts ==
Chart performance for "Io e te da soli"
Chart (1970–1971)	Peak position
Italy (Discografia Internazionale)	2
Italy (Musica e dischi)	2
