= Hagel =

Hagel is a German surname. Notable people with the surname include:

- Brandon Hagel (born 1998), Canadian ice hockey player
- Catherine Hagel (1894–2008), American supercentenarian
- Chuck Hagel (born 1946), American politician and Secretary of Defense
- Frank Hagel (born 1933), American painter and sculptor
- Glenn Hagel (born 1949), Canadian politician
- Jenny Hagel, American comedy writer
- John Hagel III, author and consultant
- Kyle Hagel (born 1985), Canadian ice hockey player
- Lawrence Bain Hagel (born 1947), American judge
- Manuel Hagel (born 1988), German politician
- Otto Hagel (1909–1973), American photographer and filmmaker

== See also ==
- Hegel (disambiguation)
