= Gianfranco Battisti =

Italian corporate executive

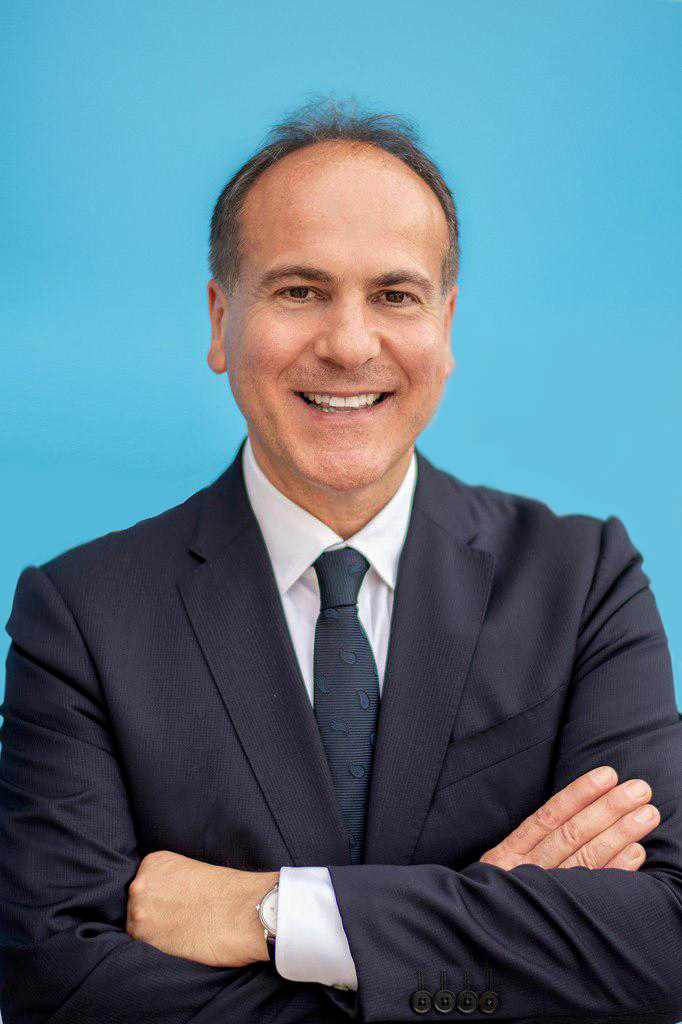
- Born: 19 January 1962 (age 64); Fiuggi
- Occupation: Businessman
- Known for: CEO and general manager of Ferrovie dello Stato Italiane

Gianfranco Battisti (born 19 January 1962 in Fiuggi) is an Italian corporate executive. Since 31 July 2018, he has served as a chief executive officer (CEO) and general manager of Ferrovie dello Stato Italiane S.p.A.

== Education ==
Battisti has a degree in Political Science and International Economics and Management.

== Career ==
Gianfranco Battisti began his career in 1988 with Fiat S.p.A. in marketing management.

Ten years later, he joined the company Ferrovie dello Stato Italiane S.p.A. as its head of night train marketing and revenue management. He eventually rose further in a leadership role when he became the marketing manager for the company.

As of 2009, Battisti held the roles of director of the company Artesia S.p.A (until 2011), director of both the national and the international passenger division, as well as that of high speed for Trenitalia (until 2017). During the same year, Gianfranco Battisti led the process that safely brought 10 million passengers to their destinations at a high speed. As a result, he also received the Global Award WTM (World Travel Market).

From 2017 to October 2018, he was chief executive officer (CEO) of FS Sistemi Urbani.

In July 2018, Battisti was appointed chief executive officer and general manager of Ferrovie dello Stato Italiane S.p.A.

Since 31 July 2019, he has been chairman of the FS Foundation.

In March 2020, he recorded his best business result to date. He was presented with the 2019 FS Italiane Group financial results because of taking in more than 12 billion euros in revenue and 584 million in net profit.

== Other roles covered ==
He is a member of the Community of European Railway and Infrastructure Companies (CER) management committee. In October 2019, Battisti also joined the CEO's Call to Action, the appeal for sustainable development launched by the international network CSR Europe to business leaders. He was also appointed ambassador for promoting diversity in the transport sector. From July 2017 to May 2020, Battisti served as national president of Federturismo, a Confindustria federation that unites companies in the sector at a national and international level. He is part of both the committee of reference for the European University of Rome and the management committee of the Associazione Nazionale Onlus Incontradonna, which deals with the prevention of breast cancer.

== Acknowledgements ==
In London in 2009, he was awarded the Global Award WTM (World Travel Market) for developing the high-speed business in Italy.

== Honours ==

Commander of the Order of Merit of the Italian Republic (Commendatore Ordine al Merito della Repubblica Italiana)

Knight of the Order of Merit of The Italian Republic (Cavaliere Ordine al Merito della Repubblica Italiana)
