= Jack Rubinacci =

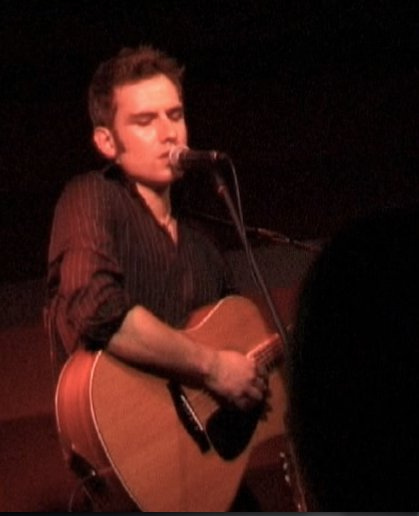
- Black and White Portrait of artist Jack Rubinacci 2015

Background information
- Born: Rubinacci; 31 August 1975 (age 51); Rome, Italy
- Genres: Alternative, indie rock
- Occupation: Singer-songwriter
- Instruments: Vocals, guitar, piano, drums, bass
- Years active: 1989–present
- Label: Rar Records
- Website: www.jackrubinacci.com

Jack Rubinacci (born 31 August 1975) is an Anglo-Italian singer, musician, songwriter and author. His songs have been recorded or covered by several different well-known artists throughout the world.

== Biography ==
Rubinacci was born in Trastevere, Rome, Italy. He moved to England at the age of two, spending most of his childhood following his mother around where her work as an English school teacher took her, including Sicily and Birmingham.

At age 11, Rubinacci met his father for the first time, His father worked as a piano bar player in Rome and was previously lead singer and bass player in the popular Italian band I Romans. At 14, Rubinacci followed in his father's footsteps and started writing songs and performing in school bands. His first ever performance on stage was at his school's annual music night, and can be found on YouTube.

During his late teens Rubinacci was the lead singer for local heavy rock bands such The Head Dwellers and Bad Penny. His songwriting was still in its nascent form. It wasn't until his early 20s that both his guitar playing and song writing started to develop. It was at this point that he joined Honeyman, a popular Birmingham, UK based alternative band. Formed in August 1997, by early 1998, the band had become one of the most talked about bands on the local scene. Their sound mixed funk, reggae and grunge together and the band quickly became regarded as one of the most exciting live acts to come along in a long time. In 2010 a YouTube documentary charting the first year of the band's rise was released.

At 24, after having studied the history of art at University of Central England, Rubinacci went solo and toured as the opening act for many international artists including, Jackson Browne, Joe Cocker, The Script, John Martyn, Tom McRae, JD Souther, White Lies, Dar Williams, Thea Gilmore, Ben Christophers, All About Eve and Rodrigo y Gabriela.

In 2005 Rubinacci appeared on Italian TV as a guest on Destinazione San Remo. In 2006 Rubinacci created his own record company, RAR Records. When it came to choose a producer for his debut album, Rubinacci approached his main choice, Tchad Blake. Blake described Rubinacci's song writing as some of the best he had heard in long time. The album was recorded at Peter Gabriel's Real World Studio with Jerry Marotta on drums, and was mastered at Abbey Road Studio, London.

Rubinacci's debut album received reviews such as

- "If you’ve not heard of Rubinacci, it's about time", Drammens Tidende.
- "Rubinacci has a long career in front of him", Tonsberg Blad
- "A good debut album from an artist we must hear more from", Varden.
- "Full of emotion and craft". Fredriksstad Blad
- "...Rubinacci has a good voice and an obvious talent for songwriting ..." Dagbladet.

In September 2008 Rubinacci signed a tour deal with a clothes retailer in Norway. The collaboration between an artist and a clothes retailer was the first of its kind in Norway and created a large amount of media interest.

After an extensive tour for his debut album in 2008/9, Rubinacci returned home and began writing his second album originally entitled The Glacier Bridge. However, both the title and the themes for the album changed when Rubinacci unexpectedly lost his best friend during the writing sessions. The album became The Opal Tree, and dealt with Rubinacci's struggle to understand the loss of his friend. The title for the album came from the name of the tree Rubinacci planted in his garden the day after he heard the news of his friend.

He recorded his second album in Washington, D.C., with Danish record producer Thomas Johansen and like his first was well received by music critics.

Rubinacci's albums have now been sold and downloaded over 30,000 times. As of 2015, eight songs from his first two albums have been repeatedly played on various radio stations around the world including France, Italy, Norway and Asia. A further four songs from the first two albums have been covered by major label artists.

In June 2012, Rubinacci was featured on the front page of Yahoo News in France as "International Discovery of the Week". His first single received positive reviews in France and was featured prominently on various radio stations there.

In October 2012, Rubinacci was asked to open for Lionel Richie at Oslo Spektrum. He performed again at Oslo Spektrum in March 2014, this time opening for The Dixie Chicks at a sold out show

In the summer of 2014, Rubinacci opened the largest and most important music festival in Norway, Norwegian Wood, opening for headline act Arcade Fire on The Reflektor Tour.

In 2018 Rubinacci released his first self produced album. Written, recorded and produced in his home studio, the album Want, went on to become his most successful album featuring his most successful song to date, Truth In A Kiss. The album and the videos for it have now been played over a million times.

In 2019 Rubinacci collaborated with the UK studio band The Studio Rats, as featured singer on several of their songs. The song Strangers When We Meet would go on to become a hit in Brazil, reaching top 10 on Spotify.

At the end of 2019 Rubinacci toured with Heather Nova, opening for her on the Scandinavian leg of her European tour.

== Loss of voice ==
On 27 August 2018, Rubinacci was featured on the front page of Drammens Tidende newspaper. In the article, Rubinacci revealed for the first time, that for the last 12 months, he had been struggling with his voice, and had suffered an almost total loss of ability to talk. The article explains that a combination of personal stress, together with a bacterial infection, had caused him to almost totally lose his voice. In total he was unable to sing for the best part of a year. He explained that he thought his career was over.

== Education ==
Rubinacci has BA (hons) in Law, and a PGDip in The History Of Art, both from University of Central England

== Discography ==
- The Boys at Twilight 2008
- The Opal Tree 2012
- From This Silence 2014
- Forgotten songs 2000-2014
- Want 2018
- 12 2019
- Songs For Spring 2020
- A Thousand Winters 2021
- Halo 2024

== Song writing and covers ==
Rubinacci has had his songs covered and recorded by several well-known artists. Most recently Asian super star A-do, covered one of Rubinacci's songs on his new album gaining positive critical acclaim in Asia.

In 2011, Rubinacci co wrote a song with Mogol. The song "You Shine" is featured on the debut album by the popular Italian duo I Btwins.

=== Song writing ===
1. "Amore in Ogni Cosa". Artist: Carlotta. Album: Promessa. 2002 (Italy)
2. "掛失/The Darkest Sun". Artist: A Do. Album: 9th Time Falling In Love. 2012. (Asia)
3. "好久-坤哥". Artist: Ken Yang. 2012. (Asia)
4. "One Night Symphony". Abi F. Jones. 2012. (UK)
5. "Following A Light". James BKS. 2012 (USA)
6. "Chocolate Covered Kiss". Artist: BTwins. Album: Dance Floor. 2012. (Italy)
7. "How Do You Say Goodbye". Artist: BTwins. Album: Dance Floor. 2012. (Italy)
8. "Slow Down". Artist: BTwins. Album: Dance Floor. 2012. (Italy)
9. "Girl". Artist: BTwins. Album: Dance Floor. 2012. (Italy)
10. "Dance Floor". Artist: BTwins. Album: Dance Floor. 2012. (Italy)
11. "So Close To Love". Artist: BTwins. Album: Dance Floor. 2012. (Italy)
12. "Benvenuto Al Mondo". Artist: Davide Mogavero. Album: Benvenuto Al Mondo. 2012. (Italy)
13. "She Makes Me". Artist: Davide Mogavero. Album: Benvenuto Al Mondo. 2012. (Italy)
14. "Take Me". Artist: Davide Mogavero. Album: Benvenuto Al Mondo. 2012. (Italy)
15. "If I Could Only Keep My Head". Artist: Davide Mogavero. 2012 (Italy)
16. "Brilli (You Shine)". Artist: BTwins. Album: BTwins. 2011
17. "You Shine". Artist: BTwins. Album: BTwins. 2011. (Italy)
18. "Ora". Artist: Davide Mogavero. 2012. (Italy)
19. "Anna C'e". Artist: Davide Mogavero. 2012. (Italy)
20. "Already Gone". Artist: Rex Riot. 2013. (USA)
21. "In The Light Of Day". Artist: Rex Riot. 2013. (USA)
22. "By The Gate". Artist: Davide Mogavero. 2015. (Italy)

== Help My Tinnitus ==
Rubinacci suffers from Tinnitus and is a vocal advocate for more education and awareness of the dangers of exposure to loud noise, especially among musicians. He has written and released two books on the subject and has set up a website called Help My Tinnitus which offers advice to fellow tinnitus sufferers. He has been featured on several podcasts talking about tinnitus and has shared many videos on YouTube about the subject.
