= Chris Hegel =

German politician (born 2000)

Member of the Landtag of Baden-Württemberg
- Incumbent
- Assumed office 11 May 2026

Personal details
- Born: 2000 (age 25–26)
- Party: Alternative for Germany

Chris Hegel (born 2000) is a German politician who was elected member of the Landtag of Baden-Württemberg in 2026. He has served as group leader of the Alternative for Germany in the district council of the Ostalbkreis since 2025.
