= Pasquale Panella =

Italian lyricist and writer

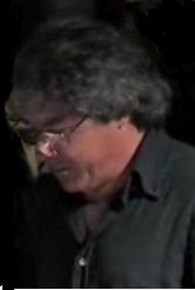
- Born: 12 January 1950 (age 76); Rome, Italy
- Occupations: Lyricist, writer

Pasquale Panella (born 12 January 1950) is an Italian lyricist, playwright, poet and novelist. He sometimes used the pen names Duchesca and Vanera.

== Life and career ==
Panella was born in Rome. After graduating from the Istituto Magistrale, he started his career as author and sometimes also actor of avant-garde theatre. In 1976, he began collaborating as a lyricist with Enzo Carella, notably writing the lyrics of "Barbara", which placed second at the 29th edition of the Sanremo Music Festival.

In 1983, Panella was commissioned by Lucio Battisti the lyrics of the Battisti-produced Adriano Pappalardo's album Oh! Era Ora; starting from the 1986 album Don Giovanni, he then became the lyricist of Battisti's following albums. In the second half of the 1980s, he also started a successful and sometimes uncredited collaboration with Amedeo Minghi. His collaborations also include Zucchero Fornaciari, Mina, Mango, Premiata Forneria Marconi, Gianni Morandi, Angelo Branduardi, Marcella Bella, Anna Oxa, Mietta, Sergio Cammariere, Mino Reitano.

He collaborated with Riccardo Cocciante writing the lyrics of the Italian versions of the stage musicals Notre-Dame de Paris and Giulietta e Romeo.

Panella has also built a significant career as a book writer, distinguished by his poetic and experimental style. His literary works explore the evocative power of language, often challenging traditional narrative structures. In his books, such as Naso and Poema Bianco, refined wordplay emerges alongside a unique sensitivity to the written word, transforming it into a continuous flow of images and meanings. His writing, sometimes hermetic and sometimes ironic, creates a textual universe that reflects his worldview, where the boundary between poetry and prose dissolves, offering the reader an immersive and original experience.

His works are currently being republished by the SPedizioni publishing house, which he founded together with his son Silvano, also a writer.

== Literary works ==
Novels and short stories

- La corazzata, Roma, Minimum Fax, 1997. ISBN 88-86568-29-0.
- Oggetto d'amore, Roma, Minimum Fax, 1998. ISBN 88-86568-52-5.
- Il Voce, Roma, SPedizioni, 2020. ISBN 979-12-80095-01-5.
- La Terza Palla, Roma, SPedizioni, 2020. ISBN 979-12-80095-05-3.
- Primo Foglio, Roma, SPedizioni, 2021. ISBN 979-12-80095-09-1.
- Secondo Foglio, Roma, SPedizioni, 2021. ISBN 979-12-80095-11-4.
- Terzo Foglio, Roma, SPedizioni, 2022. ISBN 979-12-80095-18-3.
- Quarto Foglio, Roma, SPedizioni, 2022. ISBN 979-12-80095-20-6.
- Romanzo in corso, Roma, SPedizioni, 2024. ISBN 979-12-80095-43-5.

Collections of poems

- Stupido Terremoto, Roma, Librauser, 1997; Roma, SPedizioni, 2022.
- Poema bianco, Roma, IriEd, 2008; Torino, Miraggi Edizioni, 2017. ISBN 978-88-99815-54-7; Roma, SPedizioni, 2017. ISBN 978-88-941517-3-2.
- La piazza, vie di entrata e vie di uscita, in Giampiero Castellotti, Piazze in piazza, Roma, SPedizioni, 2016. ISBN 978-88-941517-0-1.
- Impronte di lettura della mano, in Lucio Saviani, Mani, Fefè, 2017. ISBN 978-88-95988-94-8.
- Il gioco del mondo, in Lucio Saviani, Ludus Mundi, Moretti e Vitali, 2017. ISBN 978-88-7186-672-7.
- Naso, Roma, Fefè editore, 2018. ISBN 978-88-94947021.
- Mistrà, Roma, SPedizioni, 2020. ISBN 978-88-941517-8-7.
- Versi accorati, in Mojmir Jezek, Del Cuore, Core edizioni, 2020. ISBN 978-88-945678-0-9.
- Mi chiamo Arianna, Roma, SPedizioni, 2021. ISBN 979-12-80095-14-5.
- Collaborazione in Morgan, Parole d'aMorgan, Baldini e Castoldi, 2022.
- Naso e più, Roma, SPedizioni, 2022. ISBN 979-12-80095-16-9.
