= Alberto Radius =

Italian musician (1942–2023)

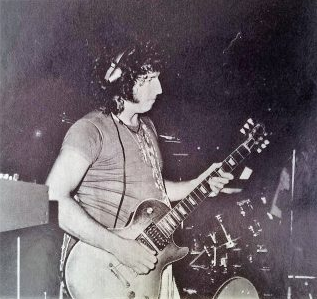
- Radius in the 1960s
- Born: 1 June 1942; Rome, Kingdom of Italy
- Died: 16 February 2023 (aged 80); San Colombano al Lambro, Italy
- Occupation: Singer-songwriter
- Musical career
- Genres: Rock; Pop; Art rock; Blues
- Instrument: guitar

Alberto Radius (1 June 1942 – 16 February 2023) was an Italian guitarist, singer-songwriter, arranger, and record producer. Besides his solo career, he is well known as a member of the group Formula 3 and for his collaboration with prominent artists such as Lucio Battisti and Franco Battiato.

== Life and career ==
Born in Rome, Radius started performing in the late 1950s as a guitarist in the local band White Booster. After experiences with the Mario Perrone orchestra and with the band I Campanino, he briefly entered the group I Quelli (later renamed as Premiata Forneria Marconi), replacing Franco Mussida during his military service.

In 1969, together with Gabriele Lorenzi and Tony Cicco, Radius formed the band Formula 3, with whom, under the production of Lucio Battisti, he had significant success for a lustre. He also became a regular collaborator of Battisti, serving as guitarist in most of his works of the time. In 1972, he made his solo debut with the album Radius, which included guest performances of many notable musicians including Demetrio Stratos, Vince Tempera, and his former Premiata Forneria Marconi bandmates Franz Di Cioccio and Giorgio Piazza.

After the disbandment of Formula 3 in 1974, Radius was part of the short-lived progressive rock musical project Il Volo and from 1976 he reprised his solo career. In 1978 he opened his recording studio, Studio Radius, and in this period he also started collaborating as a composer and a record producer for other artists. Between the late 1970s and the early 1980s he was a close collaborator of Franco Battiato, appearing in various roles in several Battiato's albums and collaborating with artists produced at the time by Battiato such as Milva, Alice and Giuni Russo. In 1980 he co-wrote and recorded the successful disco song Wojtyla Disco Dance, being credited as Freddy The Flying Dutchman.

In the second half of the 1980s Radius formed the group Cantautores with whom he released two albums and served as live band in several television programs; in 1990 he joined the Formula 3 reunion.

Radius died in San Colombano al Lambro on 16 February 2023, at the age of 80.

== Solo discography ==
- 1972 – Radius (Numero Uno, ZSLN 55153)
- 1976 – Che cosa sei (CBS, 81476)
- 1977 – Carta straccia (CGD, 20008)
- 1979 – America Good-Bye (CGD, 20122)
- 1981 – Leggende (CGD, 20236)
- 1982 – Gente di Dublino (CGD, 20333)
- 1985 – Elena e il gatto (Panarecord, 33328)
- 1987 – Frammenti di Alberto Radius (antologia)
- 2004 – Please My Guitar (Idea, COM 151)
- 2013 – Banca d'Italia (Videoradio/Self, VRCD 000835)
- 2015 – ....una sera con Lucio (Videoradio/Self)
- 2017 – Antichi amori (PLAYaudio)
