= Ondarock =

Italian online music magazine

- Website type: Online magazine
- Owner: Claudio Fabretti
- Website: www.ondarock.it
- Launched: February 2001; 25 years ago
- Current status: Active

Ondarock ("RockWave") is an Italian online magazine focused on music journalism, founded by Claudio Fabretti in February 2001. It won the 2013 Targa Mei Musicletter award for "Best Website". The magazine is regarded as one of the most authoritative music publications online and ranks among the most visited sites in its niche.

== History ==
As early as 1999, Claudio Fabretti began experimenting with website creation using Geobuilder, developing a personal site to host his music articles written for the weekly magazine Avvenimenti. In February 2001, he launched the domain ondarock.it, inspired by the new wave movement. The name aimed to evoke "the suggestion of web navigation and a distinct musical attitude". Early articles covered artists like David Bowie, Neil Young, Led Zeppelin, and R.E.M., alongside lesser-known indie rock acts.

During this period, Ondarock transitioned from a personal project to a collaborative effort, with contributors like Paolo Sforza, Mauro Roma, and Marco Delsoldato joining. The site introduced new sections such as Rock e dintorni ("Rock and Beyond") and Angolo Dark ("Dark Corner"), as well as a short-lived space dedicated to female singer-songwriters.

The Cinema section grew significantly, eventually spinning off into a standalone online magazine, Ondacinema, in 2008 under editors Elisa Goolvart and Rocco Castagnoli. Tragically, both editors died in a car accident shortly afterward.

In 2013, Ondarock received the Targa Mei Musicletter award for "Best Website", praised for its "quality content spanning independent music and mainstream genres, up-to-date coverage, and excellent navigability".
