= Lucio Battisti =

Italian singer-songwriter and composer (1943–1998)

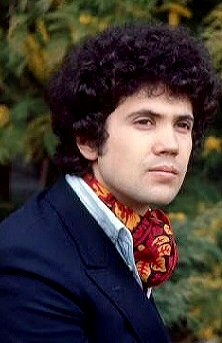
- Lucio Battisti in the late 1960s

Background information
- Born: 5 March 1943; Poggio Bustone, Lazio, Kingdom of Italy
- Died: 9 September 1998 (aged 55) Milan, Lombardy, Italy
- Genres: Pop rock; soft rock; rhythm and blues; progressive rock; latin pop; disco; synth-pop
- Occupations: Singer-songwriter; composer; arranger
- Instruments: Vocals; guitar; piano
- Years active: 1966–1994
- Labels: Dischi Ricordi; Numero Uno; CBS; Sony BMG

Lucio Battisti (5 March 1943 – 9 September 1998) was an Italian singer-songwriter and composer. He is widely recognized for songs that defined the late 1960s and 1970s era of Italian songwriting.

Battisti released 18 studio albums from 1969 to 1994, with a significant portion of this catalogue translated into Spanish (various albums), English (one album), French (two albums), and German (one album). He was known to be an extremely reserved artist, performing only a small number of live concerts during his career. In 1978 he announced that he would speak to the public only through his musical work, limiting himself to the recording of studio albums and disappearing from the public scene.

== Biography ==
=== Musician and composer ===
Battisti was born in Poggio Bustone, a small town in the province of Rieti (northern Lazio), and moved with his family to Rome in 1950. A self-taught guitarist, Battisti made his debut as musician in the 1960s, performing in local bands in Rome, Naples and later in Milan, where he joined I Campioni (The Champions), the support band of then famous singer Tony Dallara. He also travelled abroad as a working musician in Germany and the UK, where he absorbed blues, soul, and the music of Bob Dylan, The Beatles, The Rolling Stones, The Animals, and Jimi Hendrix, among others, introducing those influences into Italian pop music.

Mi ritorni in mente
Mi ritorni in mente (1969)

In Milan he found the support of the French talent scout Christine Leroux, who worked for the Ricordi music label and introduced Battisti to lyricist Giulio Rapetti, better known as Mogol. Battisti penned three sizeable hits in 1966 for other artists ("Per una lira" for Ribelli, "Dolce di giorno" for Dik Dik, and "Uno in più" for Riki Maiocchi). Though not impressed at first by Battisti's music, Mogol later declared to have started the collaboration after recognizing Battisti's humble, though determined, desire to improve his work. Mogol also pushed Ricordi to allow Battisti to sing his own songs: Battisti's voice became the focal point of his strength and originality. As a singer, he made his debut with the song "Per una lira" in 1966: despite the song's poor success (only 520 copies sold throughout Italy), it allowed him to begin building his career as a singer.

Battisti continued to write for others during the late 1960s: the US rock group The Grass Roots scored a hit with one of Battisti's compositions, "Balla Linda" (translated as "Bella Linda"), which earned Battisti fourth place in the Cantagiro, a then-popular Italian popular music competition. In 1967, English band The Hollies—featuring Graham Nash—recorded a Battisti song in Italian, "Non prego per me". In 1969, Battisti's song "Il paradiso" was covered by the group Amen Corner as "(If Paradise Is) Half as Nice", hitting the number-one spot on the UK singles chart.

=== Success as a solo singer in 1970s – The Mogol-Battisti duo ===
Questo inferno rosa
The final instrumental part of Questo inferno rosa (1973)

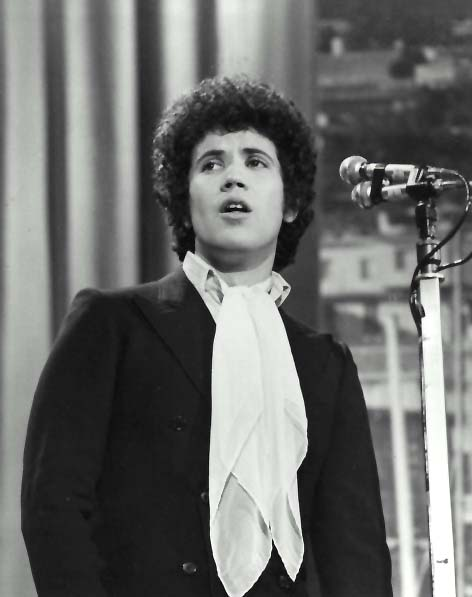
Lucio Battisti performing the song "Un'avventura" in the 1969 Sanremo festival

In 1969, Battisti took part in the Festival of Sanremo, with the song "Un'avventura", and his popularity began to increase. His first hit was "Acqua azzurra, acqua chiara", which won the Festivalbar. The same year, Ricordi issued Battisti's self-titled debut album. During this successful year he met Grazia Letizia Veronese, whom he later married and lived with until his death.

Forming a highly successful duo with lyricist Mogol, Battisti continued to issue solo albums on a regular basis throughout the 1970s. In almost every case they reached the highest places in the Italian charts and are regarded as classics of Italian pop music ("musica leggera"). He also became a popular presence on television.

In 1970 Battisti won Festivalbar for the second time in a row, with the song "Fiori rosa, fiori di pesco", and he and Mogol started to collaborate with vocalist Mina, who sang some of their most-acclaimed songs. In December, Ricordi issued Battisti's second LP, Emozioni, a compilation of previously released singles. Battisti was really angry about this, as he had composed a concept album called Amore e non-amore, but his label chose to release the compilation rather than the album, which was considered to be too experimental and advanced for the Italian audience.

Amore e non amore was eventually released in July 1971, but to preserve their creative freedom, Battisti and Mogol moved over to Numero Uno, one of Italy's first independent record labels, founded by them in 1969. In the same year English band Love Affair recorded the song "Wake Me I Am Dreaming", a cover of "Mi ritorni in mente".

The new label released Umanamente uomo: il sogno (1972) followed by the even more successful Il mio canto libero (1972). The latter topped the Italian charts for 8 weeks: one of its songs – "Io vorrei, non vorrei, ma se vuoi" – was later recorded by Mick Ronson with lyrics translated by David Bowie, as "Music Is Lethal" (on the album Slaughter on 10th Avenue). The song "Il mio canto libero" has remained one of the most popular songs among Italians. Another successful album was Il nostro caro angelo (1973).

U.S. magazine Billboard nominated Battisti "Italian Personality of the Year" in 1972, defining him "singer, composer, music publisher of international fame, has elevated Italian audience's taste and strengthened the market".

Anima latina (1974) is considered Battisti's most complex and multi-layered work, a new personal approach to progressive rock with an increased attention to rhythms and increasingly cryptic lyrics by Mogol; nonetheless, their work enjoyed a good success, remaining for 13 weeks at number one in Italian chart.

Lucio Battisti, la batteria, il contrabbasso, eccetera, released in 1976 and including the hit "Ancora tu", was an even bigger success; many of the songs clearly showing the artist's interest in the then-emerging Disco sounds and production values that would have a large influence on his three subsequent albums.

Amore mio di provincia
Amore mio di provincia (1980)

In 1977 he released Io tu noi tutti. He also relocated to Los Angeles, and issued an album, Images, that featured some of his biggest hits re-recorded in English. However, the attempt to equal his European success in the United States failed. In 1978 Battisti released Una donna per amico: recorded in London and produced by Geoff Westley, it was his best-selling LP. This was followed in 1980 by Una giornata uggiosa, produced by the same team. It contained Battisti's last great success, "Con il nastro rosa". Considered one of the duo's best compositions, it featured a long guitar solo by Phil Palmer. Battisti's songs written with Mogol continue to be covered by international artists; a more recent example is Tanita Tikaram's "And I Think of You" ("E penso a te").

Battisti, a rather shy person, had always been reluctant to talk about himself and his work. In the early 1980s he declared he would no longer make public appearances nor release any interviews: in his words "[he was going to] speak no more, since an artist must communicate with the public only through his work". In some very rare occasions, though, he appeared as a TV guest in other countries such as France, Switzerland and Germany, and only after 1982 can his vow be considered completely fulfilled, with a perseverance similar to that of J. D. Salinger and other famous recluses.

=== "Second period" ===
Potrebbe essere sera
Potrebbe essere sera (1990)

In 1981 Battisti broke the partnership with Mogol, switching to a more experimental inspiration based often on electronic instruments. The LPs of his "second period", starting from E già of 1982 (with lyrics by his wife), received a mixed reception from both critics and audiences. Mogol started to work with Riccardo Cocciante; in 1990, he declared he had not listened to Battisti's LPs for many years.

From 1986, starting with Don Giovanni, to 1994, the lyrics on Battisti's albums were written by the poet Pasquale Panella. Don Giovanni combined a return to classic "Battistian" melodies with lyrics which some felt were weird and often seemingly meaningless. Others, however, understood the lyrics to be cryptic, an intellectual mind game of sorts. Don Giovanni had a reasonable success in Italy.

The following L'apparenza (1988), however, again contained rather impervious lyrics; its success was worse than the one had by Don Giovanni, in chart position as well as in sales volumes. La sposa occidentale (1990) was released for CBS, and marked another fall in sales and success. The declining sales were hardly a concern for Battisti: it was rumoured that in the 1990s he was earning 4–5 billion lire a year (approximately 3 million Euro in 2006) solely from author rights of his 1970s songs.

Battisti's last albums were Cosa succederà alla ragazza (1992) and Hegel (1994).

=== Death ===
On 9 September 1998, Battisti died in a hospital in Milan. The New York Times reported the cause of death as cancer. He was also said to have been suffering from glomerulonephritis. He was later buried in the cemetery of Molteno, the town where he had spent his last years with his family.

Several compilations of his best tracks have surfaced after Battisti's death, including 2000's Battisti and 2001's Canzoni d'amore. His catalogue is published by BMG Music Publishing.

== Influence and praise ==
Through the years, Battisti consolidated his status as one of the best known Italian singers. His songs remain immensely popular in Italy, and are often performed live by other professional musicians.

A minor planet was named in his memory: 9115 Battisti, which was discovered by two Italian astronomers at the Sormano Astronomical Observatory in northern Italy near his home town.

In an interview, David Bowie claimed to consider Lucio Battisti his absolute favourite Italian artist and the greatest singer in the world along with Lou Reed. He also translated his song Io vorrei... Non vorrei... Ma se vuoi, retitled "Music Is Lethal", for Mick Ronson's 1974 debut album Slaughter on 10th Avenue. Other celebrated music celebrities also expressed their esteem for Battisti: Paul McCartney, Pete Townshend and Laura Pausini.

== Personal life ==
=== Political views ===
Battisti always saw himself as politically unengaged, if not apolitical, while he attributed to Mogol socialist ideas. But in a 1992 letter he expressed the intention to vote for Marcello Baraghini, A candidate in the Marco Pannella list in the year's political elections. The lyrics of the song Io ti venderei and the epithet "stupid" revolved at the protagonist of the song alienated some exponents of the Feminist Movement and prevented him from participating in The Festival of the young proletariat organized by the Italian counterculture magazine Re Nudo.

Mogol's lyrics usually talked about sentimental themes, sometimes referencing environmental themes, at the time considered to be more "elite" issues, sometimes even being detrimental in comparison to other sociopolitical issues. The themes in Battisti's songs were always very distant to the interests of "Conscious" singers and bands in the golden age of the protest song, like in the case of the rejection to Cover the song Non è Francesca by the band Nomadi in favour of Francesco Guccini's Dio è Morto.

In the first half of the 1970s a theory came to fruition, credited to Re Nudo, that attributed to Battisti fascist sympathies and accused him of funding the terrorist group Ordine Nuovo. The magazine accused him because his songs did not have Left-wing messages; Very prevalent in the songs of other singers at the time: Which caused an "Appropriation" of Battisti by the far-right, And in part (according to Mogol) a partial rejection of the May'68 movement.

== Discography ==
=== Albums ===
Name	Year	Released by	Position in Italian year-end chart	Peak in Italian weekly chart	Sales
Lucio Battisti	1969	Ricordi	3	1	
Lucio Battisti Vol. 2	1970	Ricordi		0	
Emozioni	1970	Ricordi	4 (1971)	1 (1971)	ITA: 500,000
Amore e non amore	1971	Ricordi	10	1	ITA: 300,000 – 500,000
Lucio Battisti vol. 4	1971	Ricordi	19 (1972)	3 (1972)	
Umanamente uomo: il sogno	1972	Numero Uno	2	1	ITA: 300,000 – 500,000
Il mio canto libero	1972	Numero Uno	1 (1973)	1 (1973)	ITA: 450,000
Il nostro caro angelo	1973	Numero Uno	2	1	ITA: 500,000
Anima latina	1974	Numero Uno	8 (1975)	1 (1975)	ITA: 300,000 – 500,000
Lucio Battisti, la batteria, il contrabbasso, eccetera	1976	Numero Uno	3	1	ITA: 300,000 – 500,000
Io tu noi tutti	1977	Numero Uno	2	1	
Images	1977	RCA	59	11	
Una donna per amico	1978	Numero Uno	4	1	ITA: 650,000
Una giornata uggiosa	1980	Numero Uno	5	1	* ITA: 300,000 – 500,000
E già	1982	Numero Uno	14	1	ITA: 300,000
Don Giovanni	1986	Numero Uno	3	1	ITA: 200,000
L'apparenza	1988	Numero Uno	17	2	ITA: 200,000
La sposa occidentale	1990	CBS	34	3	ITA: 400,000
Cosa succederà alla ragazza	1992	Sony / Columbia Records	57	5	
Hegel	1994	Numero Uno	68	5	ITA: 100,000

=== Singles ===
Single	Year	Weekly chart	Weeks on chart	Released by	Year-end chart	Certifications
"Per una lira" / "Dolce di giorno"	1966			Ricordi	—	
"Luisa Rossi" / "Era"	1967			Ricordi	—	
"Prigioniero del mondo" / "Balla Linda"	1968	17		Ricordi	87	
"La mia canzone per Maria" / "Io vivrò (senza te)"	1968			Ricordi	—	
"Un'avventura" / "Non è Francesca"	1969		15	Ricordi	70	
"Acqua azzurra, acqua chiara" / "Dieci ragazze"	1969	3		Ricordi	19	
"Mi ritorni in mente" / "7 e 40"	1969	1	2	Ricordi	11	
"Fiori rosa, fiori di pesco" / "Il tempo di morire"	1970	2		Ricordi	10	
"Anna" / "Emozioni"	1970	1	7	Ricordi	6	
"Pensieri e parole" / "Insieme a te sto bene"	1971	1	14	Ricordi	1	
"Dio mio no" / "Era"	1971	5		Ricordi	38	
"Le tre verità" / "Supermarket"	1971	9		Ricordi	69	
"La canzone del sole" / "Anche per te"	1971	1	1	Numero Uno	7	
"Elena no" / "Una"	1972	21		Ricordi	91	
"I giardini di marzo" / "Comunque bella"	1972	1	7	Numero Uno	4	
"Il mio canto libero" / "Confusione"	1972	1	9	Numero Uno	3	
"La collina dei ciliegi" / "Il nostro caro angelo"	1973	1	12	Numero Uno	6	
"Due mondi" / "Abbracciala, abbracciali, abbracciati"	1974			Numero Uno	—	
"Ancora tu" / "Dove arriva quel cespuglio"	1976	1	12	Numero Uno	1	
"Amarsi un po'" / "Sì, viaggiare"	1977	1	8	Numero Uno	1	
"Una donna per amico" / "Nessun dolore"	1978	1	11	Numero Uno	1	
"Una giornata uggiosa" / "Con il nastro rosa"	1980	2		Numero Uno	17	FIMI: Gold
"E già" / "Straniero"	1982	6		Numero Uno	52	

== English language recordings ==
A few of his songs were translated into English. The album Images was the only official worldwide release, however in Britain a single was published with two other translations: "Baby It's You"("Ancora tu") and "Lady" ("Donna selvaggia donna"). A full translation of the album Una donna per amico, to be called Friends, which had the above songs, was recorded but never published. The two songs and the album were translated and produced by Frank Musker.

Full list of Battisti's English recordings:

Released
- Images
- "Baby It's You" ("Ancora tu")
- "Lady" ("Donna selvaggia donna")
Unreleased
- "My Father Told Me" – instrumental of "Nel sole, nel vento, nel sorriso, e nel pianto"
- "Wake Me I Am Dreaming – "Mi ritorni in mente"
- "You and Your Tomorrow" – "Acqua azzurra, acqua chiara"
- The following were considered for Images, translated not by Peter Powell but by Marva Jan Marrow:

- "Star in a Film" – "L'interprete di un film"
- "Since I Have Forgotten About You" – "Eppur mi son scordato di te" with different accompaniment melody and an acoustic guitar
- "Our Dear Angel" – "Il nostro caro angelo"
- "Freedom Song" – An alternate translation of "Il mio canto libero", sung solo and with guitar
- "The Sun Song" – An alternate translation of "La canzone del sole", set to the original Italian version's melody
- "To Love a Bit" – "Amarsi un po'", the words were changed into "To feel in love" for the album

- Friends – A translation of the album Una donna per amico, replacing the song "Maledetto gatto" with translations of two of his other hits. All the songs were translated by Frank Musker.

1. "Baby it's You" – shorter version
2. "And I Think of You" – previous hit "E penso a te", different from the tribute by Tanita Tikaram
3. "Take it as it Comes" – "Prendila così"
4. "Lady" – slightly different from released version
5. "Day to Day" – "Perché no"
6. "Afraid of Falling" – "Aver paura di innamorarsi troppo"
7. "Pain is Gone" – "Nessun dolore"
8. "A Woman as a Friend" – "Una donna per amico"
9. "Let's Go See a Movie" – "Al cinema"

- "Pain is Gone" and "A woman as a Friend" were recorded twice. The first version of "Pain is Gone" places an emphasis on bongos and the chorus sings "Nessun dolore" in the background; the second version has an English repetition in the background. The only major difference between the two "A Woman as a Friend" versions is the second verse.
