= Formula 3 (band) =

Italian band

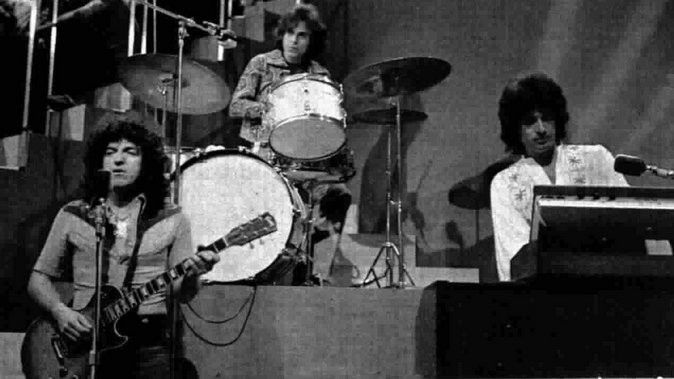
- Formula 3 in 1972.

Background information
- Origin: Milan, Lombardy, Italy
- Genres: Progressive rock, psychedelic rock, symphonic rock, pop rock
- Years active: 1969–1974; 1990–present
- Labels: Durium, Rocket

Formula 3 (also spelled as Formula Tre) was an Italian pop-rock musical group, mainly successful in the early 1970s.

== History ==
The group formed in 1969 as a power trio with Alberto Radius on guitar, vocals and bass, Gabriele Lorenzi on keyboards and bass, and Tony Cicco on drums and vocals. Produced by Lucio Battisti, they supported Battisti in his rare live concerts. Their first hit was the song "Questo folle sentimento", which peaked at number five in the Italian charts in 1970. It was followed by a series of top 20 hits, notably "Io ritorno solo" (number 3) and "Eppur mi son scordato di te" (number 2), all composed by Battisti with his writing partner Mogol. In 1971 they entered the Sanremo Music Festival with Little Tony with the song "La folle corsa". The group disbanded in 1974 with each member pursuing a solo career. They reunited in 1990 and entered the Sanremo Music Festival two more times in 1992 and 1994 with the songs "Un frammento rosa" and "La casa dell'imperatore". In 1992, Gabriele Lorenzi left the band and retired from the music industry to open a restaurant in Livorno. He was replaced first by Andrea Pistilli, then Maurizio Metals and, since 2013, Ciro Di Bitonto.

== Band members ==
- Tony Cicco: drums and vocals (1969–1974, 1990–present)
- Ciro Di Bitonto: keyboards (2013-present)
- Angelo Anastasio: guitar (2023-present)

=== Former ===
- Alberto Radius: guitar and vocals (1969–1974, 1990–2023) (died February 2023)
- Gabriele Lorenzi: keyboards and vocals (1969–1974, 1990–1992)
- Andrea Pistilli: keyboards (1992–1994)
- Maurizio Metals: keyboards (1994–2012)

== Discography ==
=== Studio albums ===
- 1970 - Dies Irae (Numero Uno)
- 1971 - Formula 3 (Numero Uno)
- 1972 - Sognando e risognando (Numero Uno)
- 1973 - La grande casa (Numero Uno)
- 1990 - Formula 3
- 1991 - King Kong (RCA PD 74992)
- 1992 - Frammenti rosa (Durium NDLP 201)
- 1994 - La casa dell'imperatore
- 1996 - La Formula di Battisti (CGD 044295004–2)
- 2001 - La folle corsa e altri successi (Idea COM138)
- 2009 - Live 40 D.O.C. (Idea COM207)
- 2020 - 1970 Recording Session (Sony BMG MUSIC ENTERTAINMENT (Italy) S.p.A.)

=== Singles ===
- 1969 - "Questo folle sentimento" / "Avevo una bambola" (Numero Uno ZN 50001)
- 1970 - "Sole giallo, sole nero" / "Se non è amore cos'è" (Numero Uno ZN 50023)
- 1970 - "Io ritorno solo" / "Nanananò" (Numero Uno ZN 50035)
- 1971 - "La folle corsa (pt.I)" / "La folle corsa (pt.II)" (Numero Uno ZN 50115)
- 1971 - "Nessuno nessuno" / "Eppur mi son scordato di te" (Numero Uno ZN 50117)
- 1972 - "Sognando e risognando" / "Storia di un uomo e di una donna" (Numero Uno ZN 50148)
- 1973 - "La ciliegia non è di plastica" / "Cara Giovanna" (Numero Uno ZN 50303)
- 1973 - "Rapsodia di Radius" / "Bambina sbagliata" (Numero Uno ZN 50317)
- 1992 - "Un frammento rosa" / "Un frammento rosa" (Instrumental) (Durium NDNP 101)
- 2013 - "La tua Africa" (digital)
