= Dischi Ricordi =

Dischi Ricordi S.p.A.
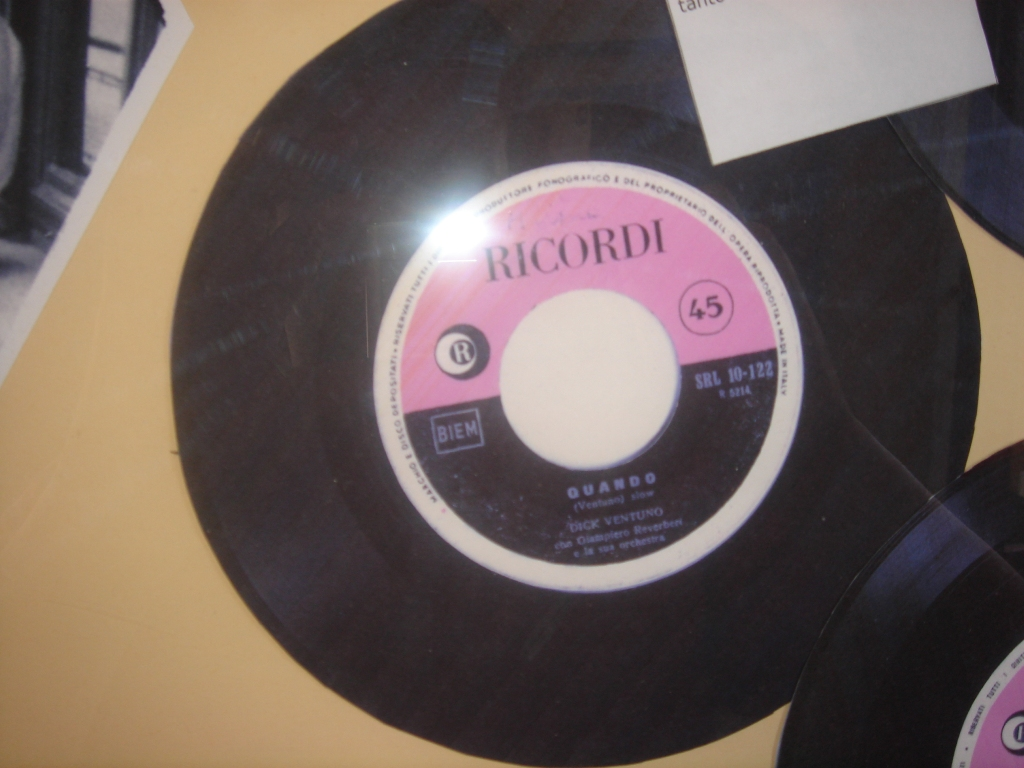
- Parent company: Sony Music Entertainment (catalogue)
- Founded: 1958; 68 years ago
- Founder: Nanni Ricordi; Franco Crepax
- Defunct: 1994
- Distributor: Self-distributed
- Genre: Various
- Country of origin: Italy
- Location: Milan

Dischi Ricordi was an Italian record company founded on October 1, 1959 by Nanni Ricordi and Franco Crepax (brother of Guido Crepax), active from 1958 to 1994.

== History ==
Dischi Ricordi had its seat in Milan (Via Giovanni Berchet, 2). In 1994, the company was bought by BMG, who acquired the catalog while maintaining the historical logo. In October 1958, the 1st album was released by Maria Callas and, at the beginning of November, the first 45 RPM by Giorgio Gaber.

Among the many artists published are: Gino Paoli, Luigi Tenco, Ornella Vanoni, Umberto Bindi, Sergio Endrigo, Enzo Jannacci, Quartetto Cetra, Emilio Pericoli, Bobby Solo, Lucio Battisti, Fabrizio De André, Dik Dik, Equipe 84, Edoardo Bennato, Banco del Mutuo Soccorso, Patty Pravo, Milva, Mia Martini, Franco Califano.

In 1994, the year that saw the artists Aleandro Baldi and Giorgio Faletti (produced by the label) to peak 1st and 2nd at the Sanremo Music Festival, Guido Rignano, last owner signs the bill of sale of the "Gruppo Ricordi" to the multinational BMG.

== See also ==
- Casa Ricordi
- List of record labels
