= Mogol (lyricist) =

Italian lyricist (born 1936)

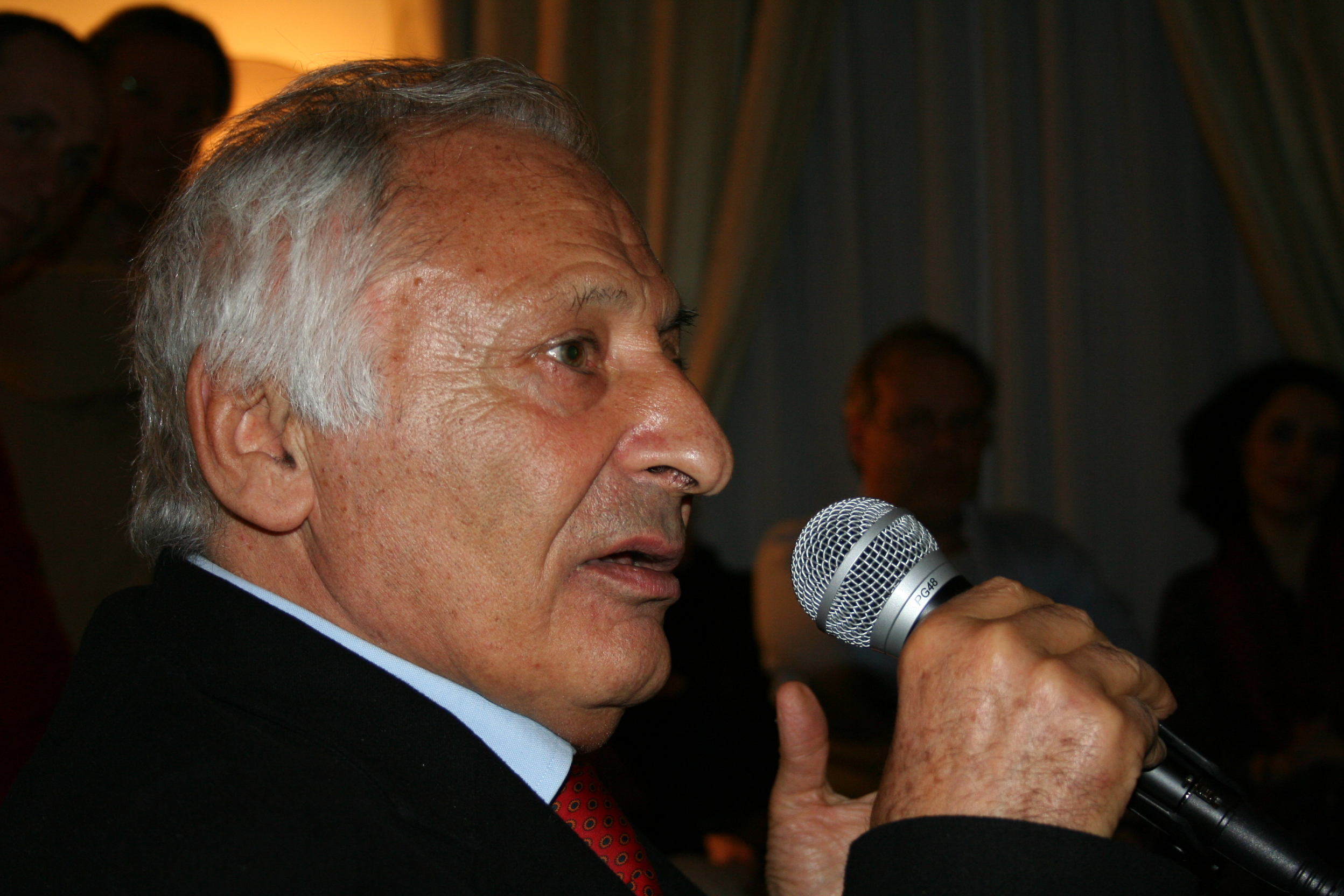
- Mogol in 2007
- Born: Giulio Rapetti; August 17, 1936 (age 89); Milan, Lombardy, Italy
- Occupations: Lyricist; Singer; Record producer

Giulio Rapetti (born 17 August 1936), best known as Mogol (Italian pronunciation: [moˈɡɔl]), is an Italian music lyricist. He is best known for his collaborations with Lucio Battisti, Gianni Bella, Marcella Bella, Adriano Celentano and Mango.

== Career ==
Mogol was born in Milan. His father, Mariano Rapetti, was a director of the Ricordi record label, and had been in his own time a lyricist of the 1950s. Young Giulio, who was likewise employed by Ricordi as a public relations expert, began his own career as a lyricist against his father's wishes.

He began using the pseudonym Mogol because it was the one that got approved by the SIAE (the Italian Society of Authors and Publishers) after none of the 30 he had proposed earlier were accepted. Mogol recalls: "They asked me to give them a list of [possible] pseudonyms, I sent them thirty. They didn't approve a single one, so I invented a hundred and twenty, and among them was Mogol. It was chosen, I never understood why, it seemed Chinese to me." He also recalled to Corriere della sera in 2017: "When the SIAE accepted the pseudonym, I almost had a heart attack because it was the name of the scouts' general in Qui, Quo, Qua [the Italian-language version of Huey, Dewey, and Louie]. I thought oh well, who cares, no one will know Mogol anyway. I was wrong."

His first successes were "Il cielo in una stanza", set to music by Gino Paoli and sung by Mina; "Al di là", a piece that won the 1961 Sanremo Festival, performed by Luciano Tajoli and Betty Curtis; "Una lacrima sul viso", which was a hit for Bobby Solo in 1964. Another song from 1961 was "Uno dei tanti," which was given English lyrics by Jerry Leiber and Mike Stoller in 1963 for Ben E. King and released under the title "I (Who Have Nothing)".

In addition to writing lyrics in Italian for a great many singers, Mogol also took it upon himself to bring English-language songs into Italian, especially film soundtracks, but also works of Bob Dylan and David Bowie.

In 1965, he met Lucio Battisti, a young guitarist and composer from the Latium region of central Italy. Mogol's lyrics contributed to Battisti's initial success, with hits such as "29 settembre". In this period, Mogol acted as both producer as lyricist, most notably on "Sognando la California" and "Senza luce" by Dik Dik, Italian-language versions of "California Dreamin'" by The Mamas & the Papas and "A Whiter Shade of Pale" by Procol Harum, respectively.

In 1967, in a reversal of Mogol bringing English-language songs into Italian, his 1966 song "Piangi con me," co-written with David "Shel" Shapiro of The Rokes (the band that recorded it), would see an English-language version reach #8 on the Billboard Hot 100 singles chart. The song "Let's Live for Today", using English lyrics and title provided by Michael Julien, was a million-selling gold record for The Grass Roots; the prominence of the English version drove the Italian version to gold-record status for The Rokes.

In 1966, Mogol, overcoming resistance from his record label, convinced Battisti to perform his own songs. The lyricist's intuition would have one of the most rewarding outcomes of the history of Italian music, as Battisti, after a halting start, would explode as a singer, becoming one of the most successful artists in the panorama of Italian music. In the same year, Mogol left the Ricordi label to create his own with Battisti, called Numero Uno, which brought together many celebrated Italian singer-songwriters. The pair wrote songs as well for Bruno Lauzi and Patty Pravo. Their greatest chart success came from the songs written for Mina in 1969–1970.

In 1980, Mogol broke the artistic relationship with Battisti, and successfully continued his independent career as a lyricist with the noted singer-songwriter Riccardo Cocciante, with whom he wrote the texts for some successful albums, first in the series being "Cervo a Primavera".

Lately, he began his collaboration with Mango, co-writing successful songs like "Oro", "Nella mia città", "Come Monna Lisa" and "Mediterraneo".

Mogol has formed a stable partnership with Adriano Celentano; his songs for Celentano are scored by the Sicilian singer-songwriter Gianni Bella. This collaboration has produced the delicate song "L'arcobaleno", included in the CD Io non so parlar d'amore, which is considered dedicated to Battisti, who had recently died. Mogol has also collaborated with singer-songwriter Jack Rubinacci.

On November 17, 2019, he was one of the speakers at the conference entitled "The breaking down of ideological frontiers and the fight against prejudice", organised in the Sala Arpa in Terni by the Grand Orient of Italy, in the presence of Grand Master Stefano Bisi. The other speakers were Paolo Mieli and Vittorio Sgarbi. Mogol's speech was entitled "Applications in society of the solidarity principle."

Mogol was a guest on the third night of the Sanremo Music Festival 2026, where he was handed a special lifetime achievement.
