= Sanremo Music Festival 1971 =

Italian song contest (21st edition)

Dates and venue
- First night: 25 February 1971
- Second night: 26 February 1971
- Final night: 27 February 1971
- Venue: Sanremo Casino; Sanremo, Italy

Organisation
- Organiser: Due Erre

Production
- Broadcaster: Radiotelevisione italiana (RAI)
- Director: Lino Procacci
- Presenters: Carlo Giuffrè and Elsa Martinelli

Vote
- Number of entries: 24
- Winner: "Il cuore è uno zingaro" Nicola Di Bari and Nada

The Sanremo Music Festival 1971 (Italian: Festival di Sanremo 1971), officially the 21st Italian Song Festival (21º Festival della canzone italiana), was the 21st annual Sanremo Music Festival, held at the Sanremo Casino in Sanremo between 25 and 27 February 1971. It was organised by the company Due Erre and broadcast by Radiotelevisione italiana (RAI). The shows were presented by Carlo Giuffrè and Elsa Martinelli.

It was the last edition in which each competing song was performed twice by two different artists. The winning song was "Il cuore è uno zingaro" written by Franco Migliacci and Claudio Mattone, and performed by both Nicola Di Bari and Nada.

== Format ==
In December 1970, Sanremo's municipal council voted in favour of assigning the organisation of the festival's 1971 edition to the company Due Erre, owned by Gianni Ravera and Ezio Radaelli, for the second consecutive year. Despite the council's decision to conduct an official examination of moving the festival's venue from the ballroom of the Sanremo Casino to the Teatro Ariston, they eventually decided to have the casino remain as the venue, with 25-27 February 1971 set as the dates. The stage was designed by Eugenio Guglielminetti.

=== Voting system ===
The vote in each show was conducted by twenty-three juries formed by newspapers across Italy, each with twenty-five members stationed in their respective newspaper's editorial office. Forty percent of jury members were required to be under the age of 20. In the first two nights, jury members gave one vote to seven different songs, while in the final they gave one vote to three songs.

== Competing entries ==
191 songs were submitted for the competition by the deadline on 28 January. The festival's organisers, Gianni Ravera and Ezio Radaelli, formed a special commission for the song selection process composed of themselves, the journalists Adriano Bolzoni, Sandro Delli Ponti, Mario Olivieri and Marcello Fratoni, and the actresses Cristina Gajoni, Gianna Serra and Francesca Romana Coluzzi. However, Coluzzi later resigned from the commission due to disagreements with other members during the selection process. On 5 February, the commission narrowed down the list of submissions to twenty and selected another twelve to be evaluated by a second commission tasked with selecting four for the competition. The second commission was to select songs with a focus on lyrical content, composed of writers and unionists, but ultimately featured members of the film industry, and was chaired by the writer Alberto Bevilacqua. They selected the songs "4/3/1943", "Bianchi cristalli sereni", "I ragazzi come noi" and "La folle corsa" for the competition on 11 February.

Requests were made by various unions to limit the amount of foreign artists allowed to participate in the competition, as was done so for the previous edition. A request from the Unione cantanti italiana (UCI) specified only six foreign artists of clear worldwide fame should participate; however, a higher number was approved by three union confederations. Seven foreign artists were eventually included in the competition.

On 25 January, the two record labels Durium and Ri-Fi announced they would boycott the festival, citing the cost of participation and dissatisfaction with its regulations. On 11 February, the record company Phonogram Inc. announced they would withdraw from the event, preventing the planned participation of the artists Orietta Berti, Fausto Leali, Anna Maria Izzo, Demis Roussos and Michel Sardou. The company cited the organisers' favouritism towards a select few record companies as a reason for their withdrawal. Orietta Berti initially considered participating in the festival on her own behalf, but she eventually decided to agree with the company's decision, leading Phonogram Inc. to reconfirm her withdrawal on 16 February. Additionally, the label Fonit Cetra announced their withdrawal from the competition on 15 February due to not finding any of the selected songs suitable to be performed by their artists Claudio Villa and Gipo Farassino. Two of their other artists, Sergio Endrigo and the band New Trolls, were granted permission by the label to participate on their own behalf. The final list of competing artists and their songs was announced on 17 February.

Competing entries
Song	Artist 1	Artist 2	Songwriter(s)	Conductor(s)
"4/3/1943"	Lucio Dalla	Nuova Equipe 84	Lucio Dalla; Paola Pallottino	Ruggero Cini; Natale Massara
"13, storia d'oggi"	Al Bano	Aguaviva	Albano Carrisi; Vito Pallavicini	Detto Mariano; Pepe Nieto
"Amsterdam"	Rosanna Fratello	Nino Ferrer	Pino Calvi; Daniele Pace; Mario Panzeri	Elvio Favilla; Vito Tommaso
"Andata e ritorno"	Maurizio e Fabrizio	I Protagonisti	Donato Renzetti; Luigi Albertelli	Gianfranco Monaldi; Detto Mariano
"Bianchi cristalli sereni"	Don Backy	Gianni Nazzaro	Don Backy	Gianfranco Monaldi
"Che sarà"	Ricchi e Poveri	José Feliciano	Jimmy Fontana; Franco Migliacci	Paolo Ormi
"Com'è dolce la sera"	Donatello	Marisa Sannia	Donatello; Luigi Albertelli; Enrico Riccardi	Natale Massara; Renato Angiolini
"Come stai"	Carmen Villani	Domenico Modugno	Domenico Modugno; Riccardo Pazzaglia	Paolo Ormi; Ruggero Cini
"I ragazzi come noi"	Mark e Martha	Paolo Mengoli	Guido Lombardi; Antonio Balducci	Franco Orlandini; Elvio Favilla
"Il cuore è uno zingaro"	Nicola Di Bari	Nada	Claudio Mattone; Franco Migliacci	Gian Franco Reverberi; Ruggero Cini
"Il dirigibile"	Antoine	Anna Identici	Maurizio Fabrizio; Luigi Albertelli	Natale Massara; Franco Orlandini
"Il sorriso, il paradiso"	Wallace Collection	Sergio Menegale	Sergio Menegale; Gianni D'Errico	Vince Tempera; Gianfranco Monaldi
"Il viso di lei"	Fabio Trioli	I Giganti	Norina Piras; Vince Tempera; Stefano Scandolara	Vince Tempera
"L'ora giusta"	Lorenza Visconti	Edda Ollari	Mario Panzeri; Gianni Argenio; Corrado Conti; Daniele Pace	Natale Massara; Sergio Parisini
"L'ultimo romantico"	Pino Donaggio	Peppino di Capri	Pino Donaggio; Vito Pallavicini	Franco Micalizzi; Renato Angiolini
"La folle corsa"	Little Tony	Formula 3	Carlo Donida; Mogol	Willy Brezza
"Lo schiaffo"	Gens	Jordan and Middle of the Road	Giandiego Deriu; Vincenzo Barsanti	Vince Tempera; Paolo Ormi
"Ninna nanna (Cuore mio)"	Caterina Caselli	Dik Dik	Enrico Riccardi; Luigi Albertelli	Natale Massara; Gianfranco Monaldi
"Non dimenticarti di me"	Nomadi	Mal	Mario Lavezzi; Mogol	Claudio Fabi
"Occhi bianchi e neri"	Mau Cristiani	Pio	Eros Sciorilli; Miki Del Prete; Alberto Testa	Paolo Tomelleri; Nando De Luca
"Rose nel buio"	Gigliola Cinquetti	Ray Conniff	Lorenzo Pilat; Mario Panzeri; Daniele Pace	Gianfranco Monaldi; Renato Angiolini
"Santo Antonio, Santo Francisco"	Mungo Jerry	Piero Focaccia	Paolo Conte; Vito Pallavicini	Detto Mariano
"Sotto le lenzuola"	Adriano Celentano	Coro Alpino Milanese	Adriano Celentano; Luciano Beretta; Miki Del Prete	Nando De Luca; Cesare Brescianini
"Una storia"	Sergio Endrigo	New Trolls	Sergio Endrigo	Angel Pocho Gatti

== Shows ==
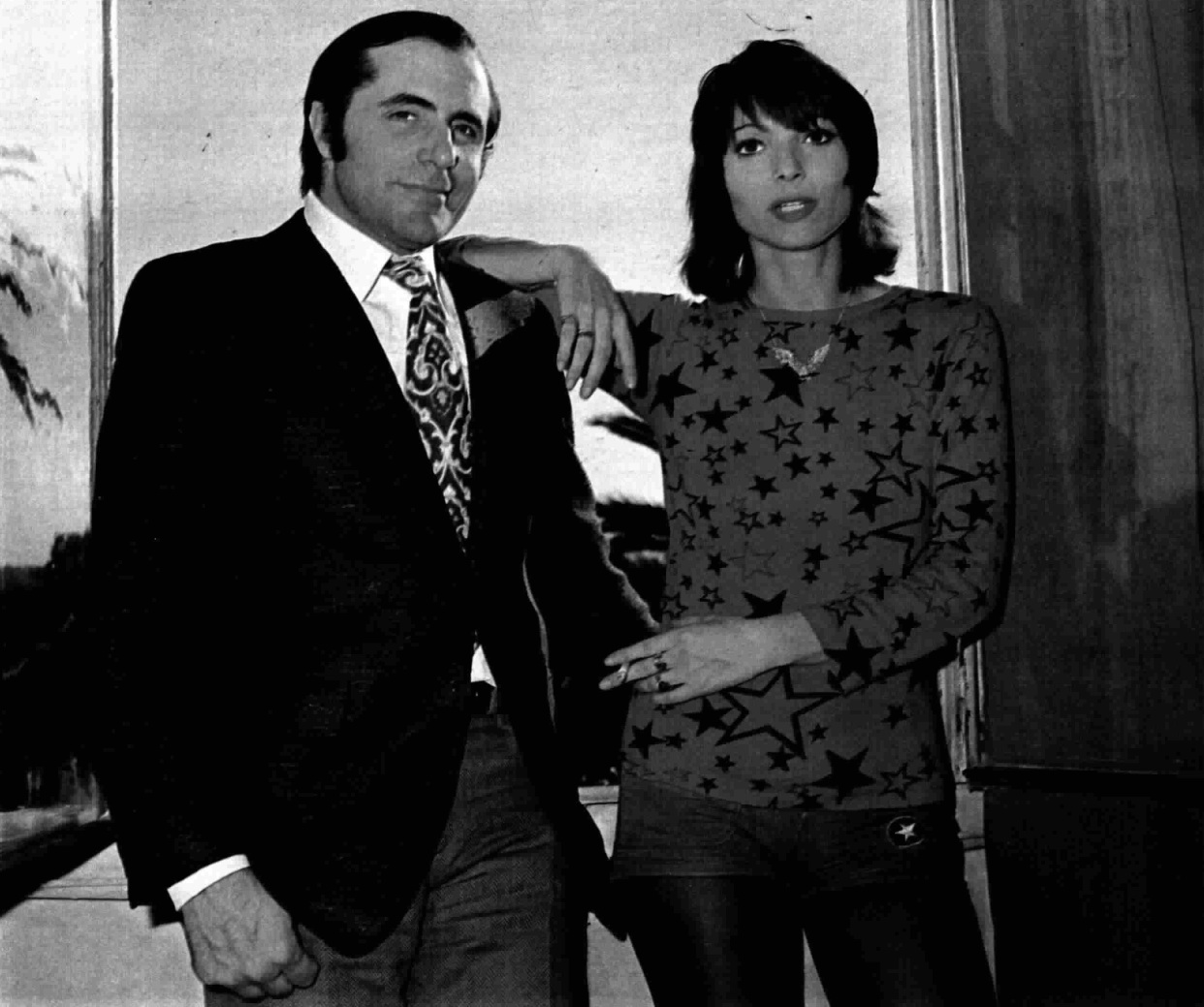
The festival's presenters, Carlo Giuffrè and Elsa Martinelli

The festival consisted of three shows held between 25 and 27 February 1971. The first two nights consisted of twelve songs performed twice. Seven songs qualified per show, creating a final with fourteen songs and twenty-eight performances. All three shows were presented by the actors Carlo Giuffrè and Elsa Martinelli. Giuffrè also recorded the song "Dichiarazione d'amore" to serve as the festival's opening theme. The shows were directed by Lino Procacci.

For the first two nights, the songs were presented in groups of three. The final was split into two halves containing every song performed once, with only the first half of the show broadcast via the Eurovision network. The half of the show each artist was designated to perform in was able to be decided by their record label.

=== First night ===
The first night took place on 25 February 1971 at 21:30 CET. Twelve songs performed and seven were selected for the final.

Qualifier

First night – 25 February 1971
R/O	Song	Artist 1	Artist 2	Points	Place
1	"Com'è dolce la sera"	Donatello	Marisa Sannia	461	2
2	"Come stai"	Domenico Modugno	Carmen Villani	383	4
3	"Occhi bianchi e neri"	Mau Cristiani	Pio	—N/a	
4	"Amsterdam"	Rosanna Fratello	Nino Ferrer	—N/a	
5	"Ninna nanna (Cuore mio)"	Caterina Caselli	Dik Dik	380	5
6	"L'ultimo romantico"	Pino Donaggio	Peppino di Capri	358	6
7	"Che sarà"	Ricchi e Poveri	José Feliciano	498	1
8	"Bianchi cristalli sereni"	Don Backy	Gianni Nazzaro	400	3
9	"Andata e ritorno"	Maurizio e Fabrizio	I Protagonisti	—N/a	
10	"Il sorriso, il paradiso"	Sergio Menegale	Wallace Collection	319	7
11	"Non dimenticarti di me"	Nomadi	Mal	—N/a	
12	"Il viso di lei"	Fabio Trioli	I Giganti	—N/a	

=== Second night ===
The second night took place on 26 February 1971 at 21:15 CET. Twelve songs performed and seven were selected for the final.

Qualifier

Second night – 26 February 1971
R/O	Song	Artist 1	Artist 2	Points	Place
1	"La folle corsa"	Formula 3	Little Tony	373	5
2	"L'ora giusta"	Lorenza Visconti	Edda Ollari	—N/a	
3	"Il cuore è uno zingaro"	Nada	Nicola Di Bari	524	1
4	"Una storia"	Sergio Endrigo	New Trolls	345	7
5	"Il dirigibile"	Antoine	Anna Identici	—N/a	
6	"Rose nel buio"	Gigliola Cinquetti	Ray Conniff	367	6
7	"4/3/1943"	Lucio Dalla	Nuova Equipe 84	408	3
8	"Sotto le lenzuola"	Coro Alpino Milanese	Adriano Celentano	398	4
9	"Lo schiaffo"	Gens	Jordan and Middle of the Road	—N/a	
10	"Santo Antonio, Santo Francisco"	Mungo Jerry	Piero Focaccia	—N/a	
11	"13, storia d'oggi"	Al Bano	Aguaviva	411	2
12	"I ragazzi come noi"	Mark e Martha	Paolo Mengoli	—N/a	

=== Final night ===
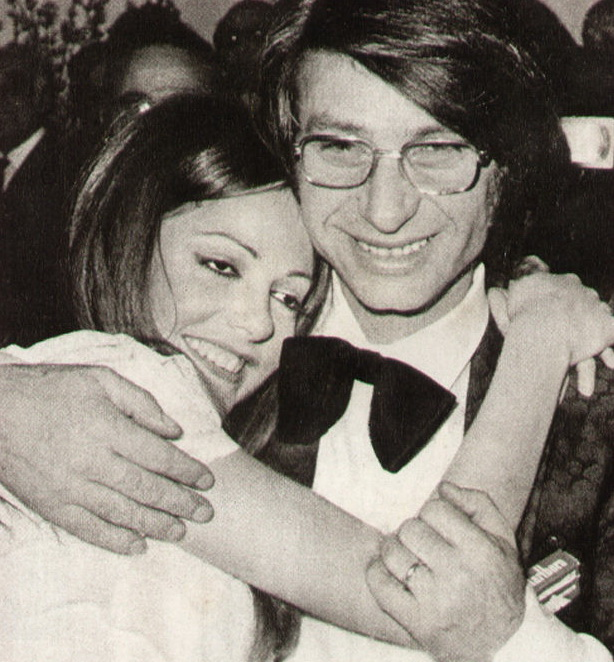
Nada and Nicola Di Bari upon their victory

The final night took place on 27 February 1971 at 21:00 CET. The fourteen songs admitted to the final were performed again and a winner was chosen.

The winning song was "Il cuore è uno zingaro" written by Franco Migliacci and Claudio Mattone, performed by Nicola Di Bari and Nada. In second place was the song "Che sarà" written by Franco Migliacci and Jimmy Fontana, performed by Ricchi e Poveri and Puerto Rican musician José Feliciano. "4/3/1943" written by Paola Pallottino and Lucio Dalla, performed by Dalla and Nuova Equipe 84, finished in third place and received an award for the best lyrics among the twenty-four competing songs, decided by a committee of journalists, writers and politicians appointed by the municipality of Sanremo. Dalla also received the Giorgio Berti award for best performer, decided by journalists at the event.

Winner

Final night – 27 February 1971
R/O	Song	Artist 1	Artist 2	Points	Place
1	"Bianchi cristalli sereni"	Don Backy	Gianni Nazzaro	76	7
2	"Rose nel buio"	Gigliola Cinquetti	Ray Conniff	58	9
3	"Il sorriso, il paradiso"	Wallace Collection	Sergio Menegale	18	14
4	"Il cuore è uno zingaro"	Nicola Di Bari	Nada	357	1
5	"Come stai"	Carmen Villani	Domenico Modugno	95	6
6	"L'ultimo romantico"	Pino Donaggio	Peppino di Capri	50	11
7	"Che sarà"	Ricchi e Poveri	José Feliciano	316	2
8	"La folle corsa"	Little Tony	Formula 3	43	12
9	"Una storia"	Sergio Endrigo	New Trolls	30	13
10	"Ninna nanna (Cuore mio)"	Caterina Caselli	Dik Dik	56	10
11	"Com'è dolce la sera"	Donatello	Marisa Sannia	136	4
12	"13, storia d'oggi"	Al Bano	Aguaviva	69	8
13	"4/3/1943"	Lucio Dalla	Nuova Equipe 84	297	3
14	"Sotto le lenzuola"	Adriano Celentano	Coro Alpino Milanese	115	5

== Broadcasts ==
=== Local broadcast ===
The final was broadcast on Programma Nazionale (television) and Secondo Programma (radio) beginning at 21:00 CET. The first two nights were broadcast on Secondo Programma (television) and Secondo Programma (radio), with the first night starting at 21:30 CET and the second night starting at 21:15 CET. The final was broadcast on television in Italy to an estimated 24.4 million viewers.

=== International broadcast ===
The first half of the final was broadcast via the Eurovision network in other countries. Known details on the broadcasts in each country, including the specific broadcasting stations and commentators are shown in the tables below.

International broadcasters of the Sanremo Music Festival 1971
Country	Broadcaster	Channel(s)	Commentator(s)	Ref(s)
Canada	CTV (Note: Delayed three-part broadcast on 9, 16 and 23 May at 14:30 (EST))			
Chile	UCTV	Canal 13 (Note: Delayed broadcast on 31 May and 7 June at 22:35 (CST))		
Israel	IBA	Israeli Television (Note: Delayed broadcast on 27 May at 20:20 (IST))		
Japan	NHK	NHK (Note: Delayed broadcast on 9 May at 14:35 (JST))	Yutaka Ishida	
Romania	TVR	Programul 1 (Note: Delayed broadcast the following day at 21:35 (EET))		
South Korea	DBC (Note: Delayed broadcast on 3 days between 14 March to 16 March)		Lee Hae-seong	
South Korea	MBC (Note: Delayed broadcast on 17 April at 19:50 (KST))			
Spain	Cadena SER (Note: Simulcast on Radio Barcelona, Radio Girona, Radio Murcia, Radio San Sebastián, Radio Sevilla, and Radio Zaragoza.)			
