= List of number-one hits of 1971 (Mexico) =

This is a list of the songs that reached number one in Mexico in 1971, according to Billboard magazine with data provided by Radio Mil. Also included are the number-one songs according to the Record World magazine.

== Chart history (Billboard) ==
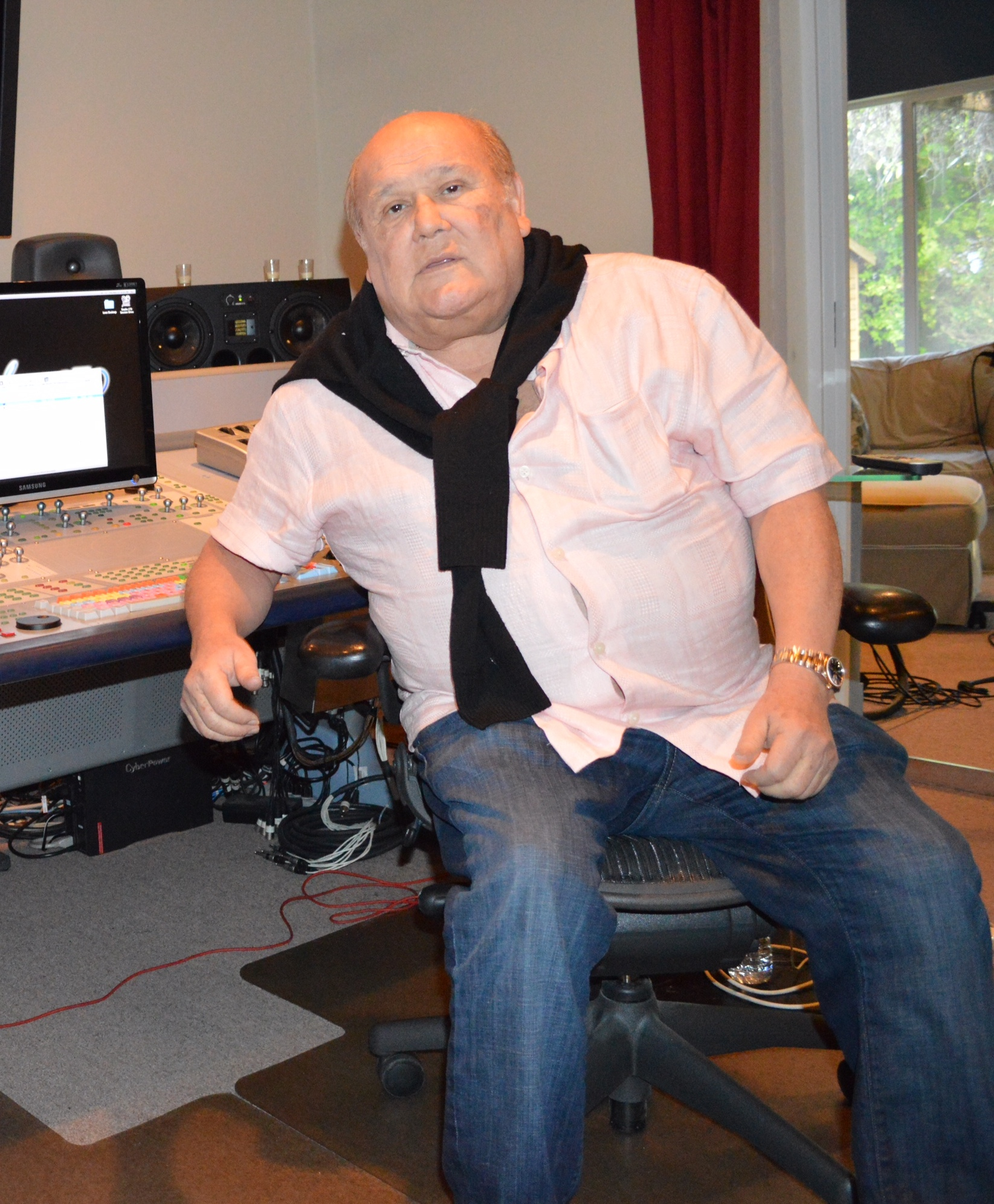
Argentine singer-songwriter Leo Dan earned his second #1 song since 1964 with "Mary es mi amor".

Issue date	Song	Artist(s)	Label	Ref.
January 9	"Y volveré"	Los Ángeles Negros	Capitol	
January 23	"Yellow River"	Christie	Epic	
January 30	"Yellow River"	Christie	Epic	
February 20	"My Sweet Lord"	George Harrison	Apple	
February 27	"My Sweet Lord"	George Harrison	Apple	
March 6	"My Sweet Lord"	George Harrison	Apple	
March 13	"My Sweet Lord"	George Harrison	Apple	
March 20	"My Sweet Lord"	George Harrison	Apple	
March 27	"My Sweet Lord"	George Harrison	Apple	
April 3	"My Sweet Lord"	George Harrison	Apple	
April 10	"Nasty Sex"	La Revolución de Emiliano Zapata	Polydor	
April 17	"Nasty Sex"	La Revolución de Emiliano Zapata	Polydor	
May 15	"Nasty Sex"	La Revolución de Emiliano Zapata	Polydor	
May 22	"Mi corazón es un gitano"	Lupita D'Alessio / Nada	Orfeón / RCA	
May 29	"Mi corazón es un gitano"	Lupita D'Alessio	Orfeón	
June 5	"Mi corazón es un gitano"	Lupita D'Alessio / Nada	Orfeón / RCA	
June 12	"Mi corazón es un gitano"	Lupita D'Alessio / Nada	Orfeón / RCA	
June 19	"Mi corazón es un gitano"	Lupita D'Alessio / Nada / Nicola Di Bari	Orfeón / RCA	
June 26	"Mi corazón es un gitano"	Lupita D'Alessio / Nada / Nicola Di Bari	Orfeón / RCA	
July 3	"Mi corazón es un gitano"	Lupita D'Alessio / Nada / Nicola Di Bari	Orfeón / RCA	
July 17	"Mi corazón es un gitano"	Lupita D'Alessio / Nada / Nicola Di Bari	Orfeón / RCA	
July 31	"Mary es mi amor"	Leo Dan	CBS	
August 7	"Mary es mi amor"	Leo Dan	CBS	
August 14	"Mary es mi amor"	Leo Dan	CBS	
August 21	"Mary es mi amor"	Leo Dan	CBS	
September 4	"Felicidad"	Víctor Yturbe "El Pirulí"	Philips	
September 11	"Mary es mi amor"	Leo Dan	CBS	
September 25	"Mary es mi amor"	Leo Dan	CBS	
October 2	"Mary es mi amor"	Leo Dan	CBS	
October 23	"Double Barrel"	Dave and Ansell Collins	Phillips	
November 13	"Rosa marchita"	Roberto Jordán	RCA	
November 20	"Rosa marchita"	Roberto Jordán	RCA	
December 4	"Porque yo te amo"	Sandro de América	CBS	
December 11	"Porque yo te amo"	Sandro de América	CBS	
December 18	"Porque yo te amo"	Sandro de América	CBS	
December 25	"Porque yo te amo"	Sandro de América	CBS	

=== By country of origin ===
Number-one artists:

Country of origin	Number of artists	Artists
Mexico	4	La Revolución de Emiliano Zapata
Mexico	4	Lupita D'Alessio
Mexico	4	Roberto Jordán
Mexico	4	Víctor Yturbe "El Pirulí"
Argentina	2	Leo Dan
Argentina	2	Sandro de América
Italy	2	Nada
Italy	2	Nicola di Bari
United Kingdom	2	Christie
United Kingdom	2	George Harrison
Chile	1	Los Ángeles Negros
Jamaica	1	Dave and Ansell Collins

Number-one compositions (it denotes the country of origin of the song's composer[s]; in case the song is a cover of another one, the name of the original composition is provided in parentheses):

Country of origin	Number of compositions	Compositions
Argentina	2	"Mary es mi amor"
Argentina	2	"Porque yo te amo"
Mexico	2	"Felicidad"
Mexico	2	"Nasty Sex"
United Kingdom	2	"My Sweet Lord"
United Kingdom	2	"Yellow River"
France	1	"Y volveré" ("Emporte-moi")
Italy	1	"Mi corazón es un gitano" ("Il cuore è uno zingaro")
Jamaica	1	"Double Barrel"
United States	1	"Rosa marchita" ("Cracklin' Rosie")

== Chart history (Record World) ==
Issue date	Song	Artist(s)	Ref.
January 16	"Cozumel"	Los Sonor's	
April 10	"Puente de piedra"	Los Chicanos	
June 26	"Puente de piedra"	Los Chicanos	
August 14	"Mary es mi amor"	Leo Dan	
September 18	"Mary es mi amor"	Leo Dan	
October 23	"Rosa marchita"	Roberto Jordán	
November 13	"Mi amor es para ti"	Los Solitarios	

== See also ==
- 1971 in music

== Sources ==
- Print editions of the Billboard magazine from 9 January to 25 December 1971.
