= Ma che freddo fa =

1969 song composed by Claudio Mattone

Single by Nada
- B-side: "Una rondine bianca"
- Released: 1969
- Genre: Pop
- Label: RCA Talent
- Composer: Claudio Mattone
- Lyricist: Franco Migliacci

Nada singles chronology
"Les Bicyclettes de Belsize" (1968)	"Ma che freddo fa" (1969)	"Biancaneve" (1969)

Audio
- "Ma che freddo fa" on YouTube

"Ma che freddo fa" ("How Cold It Is") is a 1969 song composed by Claudio Mattone (music) and Franco Migliacci (lyrics). The song premiered at the 19th edition of the Sanremo Music Festival with a double performance of Nada and The Rokes, placing at the fifth place. The first verses include a citation of Donovan's "Laléna". Nada's version was a massive success, selling about one million copies, mainly in the Italian and Spanish markets.

The song was later covered by numerous artists, including Mina, Giusy Ferreri, Renzo Arbore, Piccola Orchestra Avion Travel, and, with the title "Et pourtant j'ai froid", Dalida.

== Track listing ==
=== Nada version ===
7" single - TL 19

1. "Ma che freddo fa" (Claudio Mattone, Franco Migliacci)
2. "Una rondine bianca" (Claudio Mattone)

=== The Rokes version ===
7" single - AN 4172

1. "Ma che freddo fa" (Claudio Mattone, Franco Migliacci)
2. "Per te, per me" (Shel Shapiro, Franco Migliacci)

== Charts ==
Chart (1969)	Peak position
Argentina (CAPIF)	3
Italy (Musica e dischi)	1
Spain (AFYVE)	6

== Certifications ==
Region	Certification	Certified units/sales
Italy 1969 sales	—	600,000
Italy (FIMI) From 2009	Gold	35,000^{‡}
Summaries
Worldwide	—	1,000,000
^{‡} Sales+streaming figures based on certification alone.
