= Donatello (singer) =

Italian singer

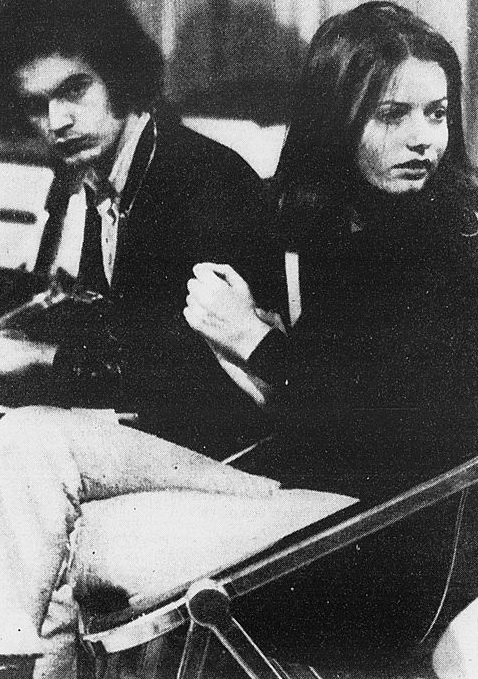
- Nada and Donatello, 1972

Background information
- Born: Giuliano Illiani; 11 September 1947 (age 78); Tortona, Italy
- Occupation: Singer
- Years active: 1962–1970s
- Label: Ricordi

Giuliano Illiani (born 11 September 1947), best known as Donatello, is an Italian singer, mainly successful in the first half of the 1970s.

== Background ==
Born in Tortona, Illiani started his musical career as a member of the band Wanted’s between 1962 and 1966. In 1968 he became guitarist in the Gianni Morandi's backing band.

In 1970 Illiani adopted the stage name Donatello and entered the competition at the Sanremo Music Festival with the song "Io mi fermo qui", presented in a double performance with the band Dik Dik. The same year Donatello got his first commercial success with the song "Malattia d'amore" which charted tenth on the Italian hit parade.

Between 1971 and 1973 he entered the main competition at the Sanremo Music Festival three more times, always being a finalist. In the same years he got two top ten hits with the songs "Com'è dolce la sera" and "Ti voglio". After the 1974 single "Irene", which he presented at Un disco per l'estate, Donatello left Dischi Ricordi and started pursuing a more personal musical path, characterized by the recovery of traditional sounds.

== Discography ==
Album

- 1970 - Donatello
- 1975 - Il tempo degli dei
- 1978 - A mio nonno ambulante

Singles

- 1970 - Io mi fermo qui
- 1970 - 100 volte lei
- 1970 - Malattia d'amore
- 1970 - Tu giovane amore mio
- 1971 - Com'è dolce la sera
- 1971 - Alice è cambiata
- 1971 - Anima mia
- 1972 - Ti voglio
- 1972 - Gira gira sole
- 1974 - Irene
- 1975 - Uomo di città
- 1976 - Un uomo in più
