= 29 settembre =

1966 song by Lucio Battisti and Mogol

Single by Equipe 84
- B-side: "È dall'amore che nasce l'uomo"
- Released: March 1967
- Recorded: 1967
- Genre: Psychedelic rock Beat music
- Length: 2:31
- Label: Dischi Ricordi
- Songwriters: Lucio Battisti and Mogol

Equipe 84 singles chronology
"Auschwitz" (1966)	"29 settembre" (1967)	"Nel cuore, nell'anima" (1967)

Audio
- "29 settembre" on YouTube

"29 settembre" ("29th of September") is a song composed in 1966 by Italian musician Lucio Battisti and lyricist Mogol and brought to success by Equipe 84 in March 1967. It topped the Italian charts for five weeks and led to Battisti's definitive affirmation as a composer. It is Notable for the innovative lyrics and sound heavily influenced by psychedelia, so much so that the song is nicknamed "Italy's Sergeant Pepper's" for the impact and the influence it had on the Italian music scene.

In 1969, the song was reinterpreted by Battisti himself, and later by many other artists in Italy and abroad. It is one of the best-known songs both in Battisti's and in the Equipe 84 production, and is considered a classic of Italian pop music.

== Lyrics and meaning ==
The lyrics, written by Mogol, tell the story of an adultery which lasts only one day and is made with lightness of mind, without consequences on the protagonist's other sentimental relationship.

The story takes place over two consecutive days. In the first, the 29th of September, the protagonist meets a girl in a bar. Almost without realizing it, the two enter into intimacy and spend the whole night together, first at the restaurant and then dancing. The next day, the 30th of September, the protagonist wakes up animated by an unchanged love for his usual partner, so much that he rushes to phone her declaring his love, as if nothing had happened the night before.

=== Theme ===
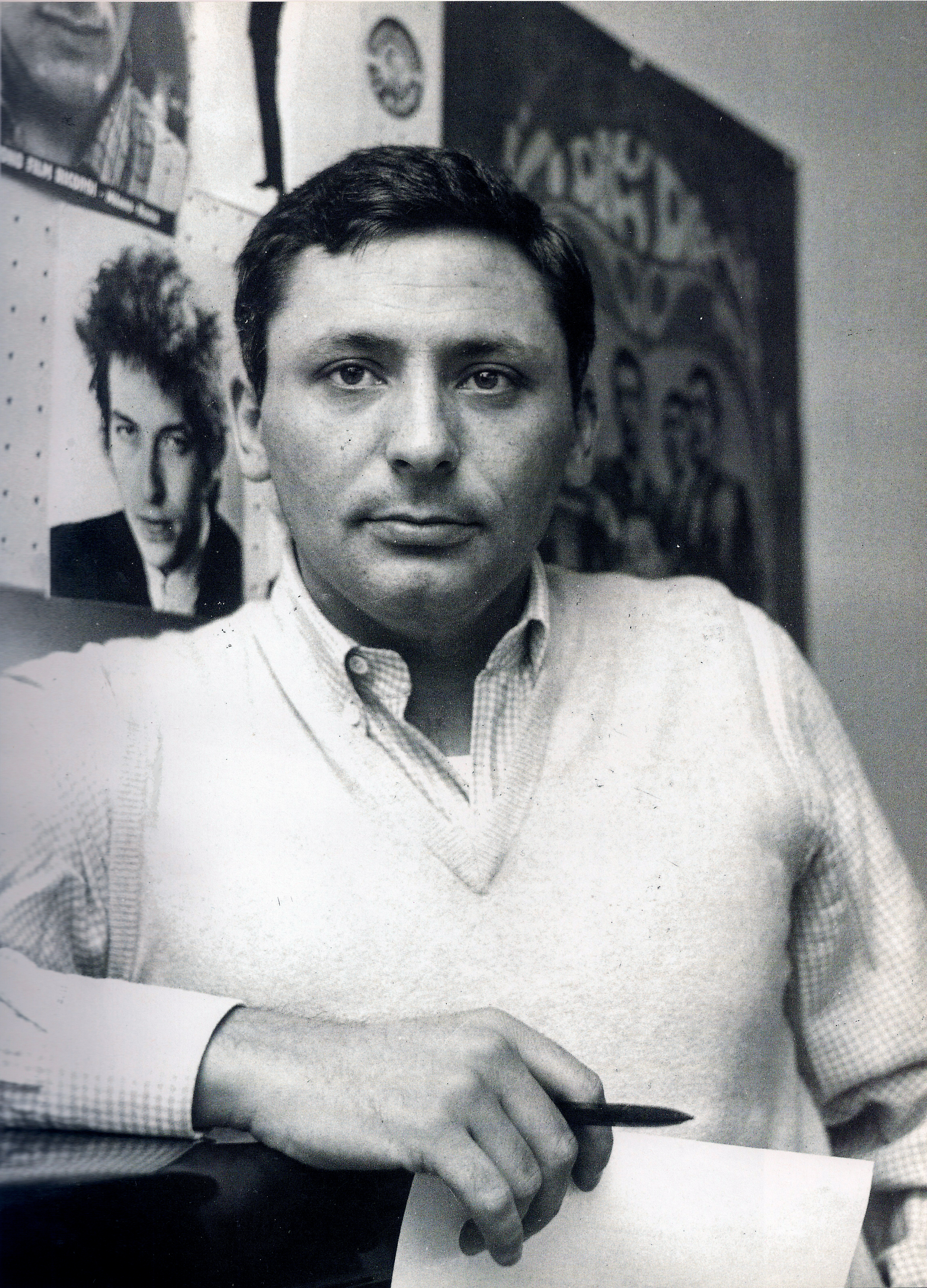
Mogol, author of lyrics, in a 1968 photograph

The central theme is adultery, a strongly innovative topic for the time. In the Italian society of the 1960s the subject was considered almost a taboo; in pop music, songs based on rosy and idealized loves prevailed, while adultery was almost always portrayed as a serious misconduct. The protagonist of "29 settembre", instead, shows no repentance and does not feel guilty when he returns to his partner; the passing of a single day erased everything, and the protagonist does not even remember the previous' night events. The message of "29 settembre", therefore, anticipates the sexual revolution which would become widespread on the next year with the Sessantotto movement.

=== Style ===
Also in its form and style, the lyrics were extremely innovative and almost experimental. The story told, in fact, is not a single episode (as almost always happened in the pop music of the time) but a complex story, which takes place in two days.

Moreover, while maintaining chronological order, the lyrics have a relatively complex plot, which does not completely coincide with the course of events. The events of the first day are not told from a contemporary perspective, but are re-evoked by the protagonist when he wakes up, the next morning: in fact all events of September 29 use the verbal time of imperfect or passato remoto, while those of September 30 use present tense or at most passato prossimo. The song, therefore, takes place entirely on the day of September 30, but the initial part is occupied by a long flashback in which the previous day is recalled, returning in the present only at the end.

The nature of flashback of the first day is also strengthened by the vague and muffled style with which the events are described, giving them the appearance of an undefined memory, which emerges with difficulty from the mind: the succession of events is indeed «swirling» and with very nuanced outlines, with many ellipses between one event and another. Some details of the story are markedly surreal and distorted, so much to resemble, according to Renzo Stefanel, the effects of an acid trip. The narrative is so blurred and surreal that the listener is kept with the doubt on whether the extramarital adventure really happened, or whether it was just a dream made before waking up.

In this way psychedelia, until then a mostly musical topic, was brought by Mogol also in the lyrics sphere.

=== Title ===
According to declarations by the lyrics' author Mogol, the day in which the story takes place (and therefore the song title) is an ordinary day, which was chosen for no particular reason. However, it was noted that the date of September 29 coincides with the birthday of his wife of the time, Serenella; this aspect could suggest an autobiographical nature of the text, almost a public confession of an infidelity made by the author. Mogol, however, argues that it was a coincidence, which he realized only one day after having written the lyrics. He said he regrets not having dedicated the song to her from the beginning, while his wife (who knew Mogol's proverbial inattention) understood that the tribute was not intentional and in fact did not thank him.

== Composing ==
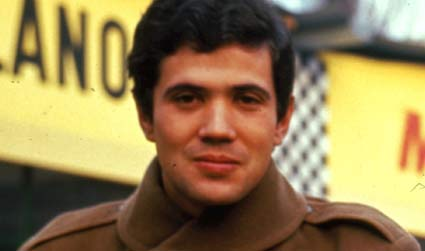
Lucio Battisti, the young author of music, still without his distinctive thick curly hair in a 1967 photo

The song's composition probably dates back to the beginning of autumn of 1966. The song had a long gestation, and remained incomplete for a long time before it was finished.

According to the testimony of musicologist Salvatore Galeazzo Biamonte, the song was composed with the precise will to overcome the classical schemes of the traditional song:

Lucio [...] was in Mogol's office who, as if to keep faith with his reputation of "pop song theorist" [...], had engaged in a discussion about the need to find new themes and new forms to be offered in songs verses. "We should," he said, "tell a whole story, perhaps choosing a date that would serve to remember it, to suggest a specific atmosphere: September 29, for example". "Perhaps" replied Battisti, "I have the right music". And he played at the piano a motif he had prepared. What came out of that was, of course, "29 settembre".

At the time, Battisti still had to discover his own talent as a singer, and he was not fully affirmed even as a song author; for this reason, the song remained for some time within a repertoire that Battisti presented to bands and singers, looking for someone who would sing them.

At first, during 1966, Battisti and Mogol proposed the song to Gianni Pettenati, but he was not entirely convinced and therefore refused to sing it.

In February 1967, just after the end of Sanremo, Battisti resumed composing the song and finally completed it.

Initially Battisti thought of interpreting the song in person: at that time, in fact, the musician (just at the beginning of his career as a singer) was starting to think about publishing a new single, to overcome the fiasco of previous year's debut single Per una lira. For this purpose, Battisti and Mogol had Mariano Detto listening the song, and asked him to make an arrangement; he immediately sensed its potential and immediately set to work.

== Equipe 84 rendering ==
The song, however, also came to the ear of Maurizio Vandelli, leader of Equipe 84, who appreciated it very much and understood to be in front of a potential success: so Vandelli began to ask Mogol and Battisti to have the song for his band.

Equipe 84 was at the peak of popularity at the time, and a short time before it was defined by John Lennon «the most up to date among Italian bands»; being the author of a song played by Equipe 84 would have given anyone great importance. So Battisti renounced to sing it personally and consented to hand it over, despite Mariano Detto insisted that it was the right song to launch his career as a singer. For the solo single, Battisti had to fall back on the two lesser known tracks Luisa Rossi and Era, which enjoyed little success.

It was Battisti's first song to be played by Equipe 84, a partnership which subsequently continued with three more songs: Nel cuore, nell'anima, Ladro and Hey ragazzo.

=== Recording and production ===
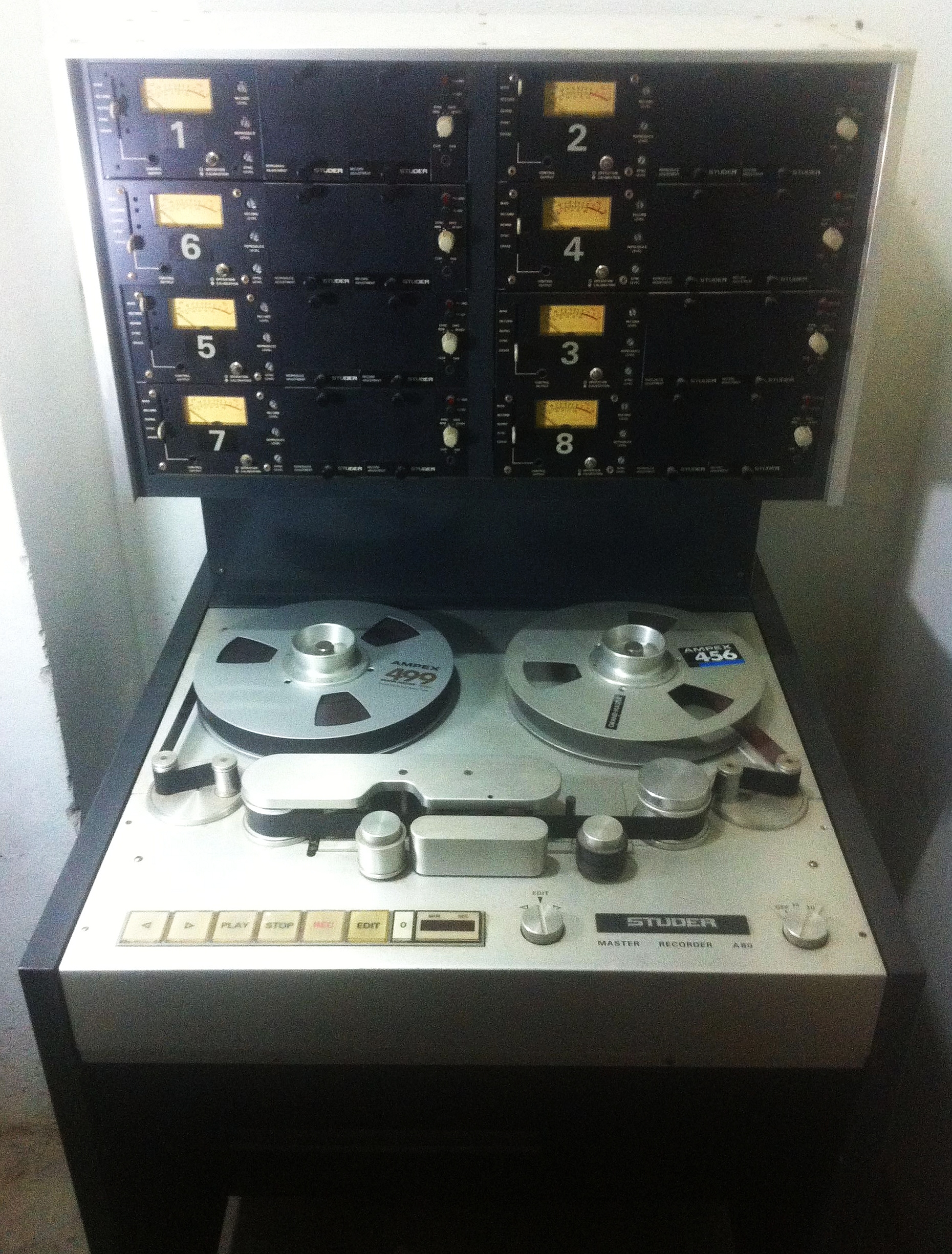
An eight-track recorder of the time

The song's artistic production was cared for by Vandelli himself.

The recording took place in the Ricordi studios in Milan. A few weeks before the studio had been equipped with an eight-track recorder, the first ever in an Italian recording studio: so "29 settembre" was the first song in Italy to be fully recorded with this new equipment.

Vandelli gave much importance to sound research, which is why the recording of the song lasted a long time. Vandelli used the studio for so many hours that he angered Ricordi's executives, who complained about excessive costs.

The song, at the time of recording, was still untitled.

During the recording, it was decided to insert in the song the voiceover of a radio speaker (Gino Capponi, a RAI of Milan's announcer) who, while reading the news of the radio bulletin, pronounces the current date, making it easier to understand the chronology of the story told. It is not clear who had this idea: Maurizio Vandelli, Mogol, and Ricordi's production manager Paolo Ruggeri all took the credit.

In the song Maurizio Vandelli played the guitar and solo voice, Alfio Cantarella the drums, Franco Ceccarelli the guitar and second voice, while Victor Sogliani the bass and second voice.

The transfer was made on March 20, 1967.

=== Publishing ===
"29 settembre"
The voiceover of the radio speaker used to mark the transition between the part about September 29 and the part about September 30

The song was published as a single in the last days of March 1967, in monophonic version, as the A-side of a 7″ vinyl disc which had È dall'amore che nasce l'uomo in the B-side.

The cover picture, which also featured a psychedelic atmosphere, was shot by Mario Schifano.

In October 1968, the song was included in the album Stereoequipe, where it was released for the first time in stereophonic version.

=== Critical and commercial reception ===
The single reached the number one of Italian hit parade in May 1967 and stayed there for five weeks.

The song became the winner of the contest issued by RAI's popular radio broadcast Bandiera gialla ("yellow flag"), and was hence honoured by the "yellow record".

=== English version ===
In 1967 Equipe 84 recorded an English version of the song titled 29th September, with lyrics translated by Tommy Scott. It was published on 45 rpm single in the United Kingdom and the United States, to weak success; it was republished only in 2008, within the compilation Let's Ride dedicated to the European psychedelic scene. It was voted no. 15 in Kenny Everett's 1977 "Bottom 30" list of the world's worst records of all time.

=== Videoclip ===
Equipe 84 played the song using lip sync inside the 1967 musicarello movie I ragazzi di Bandiera Gialla. The video, directed by Mariano Laurenti, is in color and is set in a bar on the shore of Laghetto dell'Eur in Rome.

== Lucio Battisti's rendering ==
"29 settembre"

Song by Lucio Battisti

from the album Lucio Battisti
- Released: March 5, 1969
- Recorded: 13 January – 21 February 1969
- Genre: Folk-pop
- Length: 3:30
- Label: Dischi Ricordi
- Songwriters: Lucio Battisti and Mogol

Lucio Battisti track listing
- 12 tracks: 1. "Un'avventura"; 2. "29 settembre" 3. "La mia canzone per Maria"; 4. "Nel sole, nel vento, nel sorriso e nel pianto" 5. "Uno in più" 6. "Non è Francesca"; 7. "Balla Linda"; 8. "Per una lira" 9. "Prigioniero del mondo" 10. "Io vivrò (senza te)" 11. "Nel cuore, nell'anima" 12. "Il vento"

At the beginning of 1969, Battisti, who was now beginning to establish himself as a singer, decided to record his own version of the song, to include it in his debut album Lucio Battisti.

=== Recording ===
Battisti recorded his version mostly at Sax Records studios in Milan. Sessions took place on January 13, 1969 from 9 to 14:30, on January 17 from 15 to 18:30, on January 22 from 9 to 13; the rhythm tracks were recorded on January 23 from 9 to 13:30, while vocals and overdubs on January's last week.

At last, in February, overdubs of strings and horns were added in the Ricordi studios in Milan. The transfer took place on February 21, 1969.

=== Music ===
Battisti gave a more "classical" and less experimental interpretation than Equipe 84's version. First of all, he removed the voiceover radio news announcer, a strongly innovative element in the Equipe's version, which was considered no longer necessary (since the story told was now widely known to the public and there was no need to make its understanding easier).

The choice of musical instruments is also more traditional: the arrangement consists of a tangle of guitars, bass and flutes, while there is no drum at all.

According to Renzo Stefanel, Battisti's version is psychedelic too, but is inspired by Buffalo Springfield, Peter, Paul and Mary and Tyrannosaurus Rex rather than Byrds and Love who inspired the Equipe's version.

The main innovation is Battisti's vocal performance, which in the opinion of Stefanel is superior to Maurizio Vandelli's one. In particular, the last two verses, in which the protagonist is laughing on the phone, are interpreted by Battisti in an extremely expressive way, rippling the singing with a forced laugh, which transposes into music the meaning of lyrics.

Strings and brasses, at first discrete, later acquire a more important role, and finally result in an instrumental coda which closes the track. According to Stefanel, the coda throws an ambiguous light on the mood of the protagonist, leaving open if the return with his partner is really happy or actually forced.

=== Publishing ===
Battisti's rendering was published on March 5, 1969 in the eponymous LP Lucio Battisti, his debut album as a singer. Since then it has been republished countless times in collections, compilations and best-ofs.

=== Live performances ===
Battisti sang live a hint of the song in his April 15, 1969 appearance in RAI's television program Speciale per voi and in full in radio transmission Per voi giovani in December 1971, in both cases accompanied by the acoustic guitar. The song was also often performed during his summer tour of 1969.

== Other renderings ==
Over time, the song has been reinterpreted by many other artists:

- Mario Battaini covered it in 1967
- Gianni Nazzaro, under the nickname of Buddy, covered it in 1967
- Mina recorded a cover in her 1975 album Minacantalucio, with an arrangement written by Gabriel Yared.
- Maurizio Vandelli recorded a new version in 1989, with a new arrangement written by Pino Santapaga, publishing it in the album 29 settembre 89. With this version Vandelli participated and won the first edition of the revival television program Una rotonda sul mare; the song was therefore included in the show's compilation Una rotonda sul mare vol. 2.
- Dik Dik recorded a cover in 1989, released in the album Canta Battisti Cantaitalia.
- British psychedelic band The Bevis Frond recorded an English-language cover in 1993, titled 29th September, releasing it as the B-side of a single titled Let's live for today published by Helter Skelter records.
- Equipe 84 published a live version in the 1995 album In concerto.
- Supergroup Adelmo e i suoi Sorapis (composed of Zucchero Fornaciari, Pooh's Dodi Battaglia, Equipe 84's Maurizio Vandelli, Nomadi's Umberto Maggi, Fio Zanotti and Michele Torpedine) covered the song live in 1997.
- Ornella Vanoni covered the song in 2001, releasing it in her album Un panino una birra e poi..., with an arrangement written by Mario Lavezzi and Carlo Gargioni.
- Pianist Enrico Pieranunzi recorded a jazz, instrumental version of the song in 2004, releasing it in the album Battisti in jazz. American bassist Mark Johnson also participates in the recording.
- Norwegian singer-songwriter Terje Nordgarden covered the song in 2005.
- Blues guitarist Rudy Rotta covered the song in 2006, releasing it in the album Some of My Favorite Songs.
- Pooh covered the song in their 2008 album Beat ReGeneration.
- In 2014, on the initiative of Mogol, a new version was created, with a rock arrangement written by Massimo Satta, which was performed by various authors in the project Le canzoni di Mogol Battisti in versione rock New Era.

== Bibliography ==
- Gianfranco Salvatore (2000). L'arcobaleno. Storia vera di Lucio Battisti vissuta da Mogol e dagli altri che c'erano (in Italian). Giunti Editore. ISBN 88-09-01805-2.
- Renzo Stefanel (2007). Ma c'è qualcosa che non scordo. Lucio Battisti - gli anni con Mogol (in Italian). Arcana Editore. ISBN 978-88-7966-370-0.
- Luciano Ceri (2008). Pensieri e parole. Lucio Battisti: una discografia commentata (in Italian). Coniglio Editore. ISBN 978-88-6063-161-9.
- Michele Neri (2010). Lucio Battisti - Discografia mondiale. Tutte le canzoni, le produzioni, le collaborazioni (in Italian). Coniglio Editore. ISBN 978-88-6063-099-5.
