= Che sarà =

Song by José Feliciano and Ricchi e Poveri

from the album Amici miei, Che sarà
- Language: Italian
- Written: 1970
- Published: 1971
- Released: 1971
- Recorded: 1970
- Genre: Pop
- Length: 3:30
- Label: Apollo, RCA Victor
- Composer: Jimmy Fontana
- Lyricist: Franco Migliacci

"Che sarà" (Italian: [ke ssaˈra]; "What [it] will be") is an Italian song, written by Jimmy Fontana (music) and Franco Migliacci (lyrics) for the Sanremo Music Festival 1971. Until that year, each song was interpreted by two artists/performers to showcase the songwriters' craft rather than the singers' interpretations.

"Che sarà" was sung by José Feliciano and the Ricchi e Poveri group; it came second in the Festival to "Il cuore è uno zingaro". RCA's Italian producers saw the song and the festival as a way to bring José Feliciano — already an international star — to Italy, as he already knew Jimmy Fontana. Although Ricchi e Poveri was a new, young group, it was chosen to sing the second version after Gianni Morandi — a well known Italian singer and RCA artist — had declined to sing the song. Jimmy Fontana, reportedly, was disappointed by RCA's decision and withdrew from the music business for many years.

== Recordings ==
Feliciano's recorded version was successful in Italy, in Central and Eastern Europe, the Middle East and Japan. Feliciano's Spanish version, titled "Qué será" was an even greater success in Latin America and Spain, peaking at number one in Spain. An English-language version titled Shake A Hand charted in Scandinavia but not in the Top Tens of the US or the UK.

The song is featured in the classic Bulgarian film from 1982, A Nameless Band. In the particular scene the singer Reni (played by Katerina Evro) announces "Che sarà" as "a song for love, parting, and something more."

In 2021 Ricchi e Poveri recorded the song with José Feliciano for the album ReuniON (DM Produzioni, 19439875041), also released in Russia.

== Song ==
The lyrics of the song describe the singer's sadness at having to leave his native village (Paese mio che stai sulla collina, disteso come un vecchio addormentato; "Oh my village set on the hill, lying down like an old sleeping man") and were inspired by Cortona, a small town in Tuscany where the lyricist, Franco Migliacci, had lived for many years. For Jimmy Fontana, who wrote the music, the song is devoted to Bernalda, his wife's home village.

Coincidentally, the Cortona story echoes the personal history of José Feliciano, who was born in the hill village of Lares in Puerto Rico, and who left it for New York, joining many other Puerto Rican migrants to the US. In fact, the Spanish version of the song is considered by many in the Latino population to be a "migrants' hymn".

== Chart positions ==
Version/Title°	Country	Position
IT / Che Sarà	The Netherlands	1
IT / Che Sarà	Italy	2
IT / Che Sarà	Germany	7
IT / Che Sarà	Belgium	2
EN / Shake a Hand	Sweden	1
EN / Shake a Hand	Norway	9

== Foreign-language versions ==
Country	Title	Artist
Iceland	Góða ferð	BG og Ingibjörg
Bulgaria	Spri do men	Lea Ivanova
Finland	Toivotaan, toivotaan	Eero Raittinen
Sweden	Aldrig mer	Hootenanny Singers
Denmark	Aldrig mer	Katy Bødtger
Czech republic	Nádherná	Pavel Novák
France	Qui saura	Mike Brant
Vietnam	Đôi bờ	Anh Tú, Lê Cát Trọng Lý
Hungary	Mit remélsz?	Kati Kovács
Germany	Che Sara	Karel Gott
Estonia	Lootus jääb	Eesti Raadio Meeskvartett
