= Amore disperato =

Single by Nada

from the album Smalto
- B-side: "Da grande"
- Released: 1983
- Label: EMI
- Songwriters: Gerry Manzoli; Varo Venturi

Nada singles chronology
"Ti stringerò" (1982)	"Amore disperato" (1983)	"Balliamo ancora un po'" (1984)

Audio
- "Amore disperato" on YouTube

"Amore disperato" ('Desperate Love') is a 1983 song composed by Gerry Manzoli and Varo Venturi and performed by Nada. It achieved a large commercial success, serving as a relaunch for the singer. It has been described as "a metropolitan love story told in a vivid and modern language, an original and catchy melody, [and] a playful pop arrangement".

== Other versions ==
In 1999, the band Super B got a significant success with their rock cover version of the song. Artists who covered the song also include Dolcenera and Silvia Salemi.

== Track listing ==
Single track listing
No.	Title	Writer(s)	Length
1.	"Amore disperato"	Gerry Manzoli, Varo Venturi	4:01
2.	"Da grande"	Manzoli, Venturi	3:10

== Charts ==
Chart performance for original version
Chart (1983)	Peak position
Italy (Musica e dischi)	5

Chart performance for Super B version
Chart (1999)	Peak position
Italy (Musica e dischi)	23

== Certifications ==
Certifications for "Amore disperato" by Nada
Region	Certification	Certified units/sales
Italy (FIMI) Sales from 2009	2× Platinum	200,000^{‡}
^{‡} Sales+streaming figures based on certification alone.
