= Natale Massara =

Italian composer and conductor (born 1942)

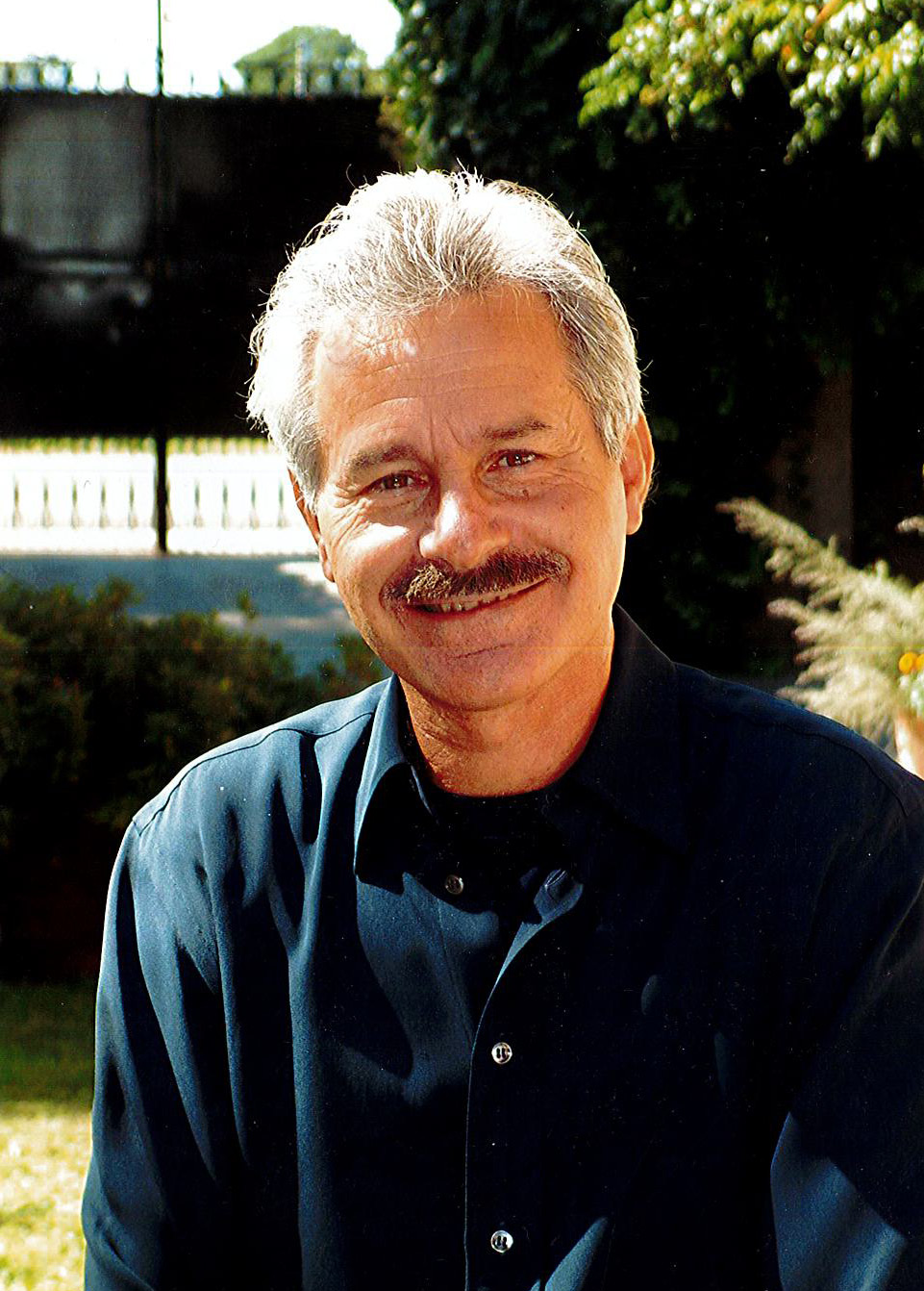
- Massara in 2016
- Born: 23 December 1942 (age 83); Oleggio, Italy
- Occupations: Composer arranger conductor

Natale Massara (born 23 December 1942) is an Italian composer, arranger, conductor and musician.

== Life and career ==
Born in Oleggio, Massara graduated in composition, clarinet and saxophone from the Milan Conservatory. He started his career in 1959, as a member of the band I Ribelli; when the group was put under contract by Clan Celentano, he started collaborating as a songwriter with Adriano Celentano, notably penning the hits "Grazie prego scusi" and "La festa", as well as with other artists of the label such as Gino Santercole and Ico Cerutti.

When I Ribelli disbanded, Massara formed his own orchestra with whom he toured nationally and abroad. In 1970, he was employed by Ricordi as composer, arranger and conductor. He was a longtime collaborator of Pino Donaggio, serving as conductor in most of his musical film scores from 1974 onwards, as well as of Milva and Mia Martini; his collaborations also include Mina, Rita Pavone, Donatella Rettore, Equipe 84, Dik Dik, Il Guardiano del Faro, Wilma Goich, Antoine, Wess, Chava Alberstein and Dori Ghezzi.

Massara served as conductor in nine editions of the Sanremo Music Festival, notably in six consecutive editions between 1969 and 1974. In 1971, he composed and recorded two albums of instrumental music, Politica and Amore giovane.
