= Il cuore è uno zingaro =

Single by Nicola Di Bari

from the album Nicola Di Bari
- B-side: "Agnese"
- Released: 1971
- Genre: Pop
- Label: RCA Italiana
- Songwriters: Franco Migliacci and Claudio Mattone

Nicola Di Bari singles chronology
"Una ragazzina come te" (1970)	"Il cuore è uno zingaro" (1971)	"Anima" (1971)

"Il cuore è uno zingaro" (Italian for "The heart is a gypsy") is a song composed by Claudio Mattone (music) and Franco Migliacci (lyrics). The song won the twenty-first edition of the Sanremo Music Festival, with a double performance by Nicola Di Bari and Nada. The Di Bari's version peaked at first place for six weeks on the Italian hit parade.

The song was also very successful in Mexico, where it was covered in Spanish by Lupita D'Alessio with the title "Mi corazón es un gitano"; D'Alessio's version, along with the original Italian versions by Nada and Nicola Di Bari, topped the charts in Mexico in 1971.

The song was later covered by several artists, including Al Martino (with the title "The Gipsy in You"), Paul Mauriat, Albano Carrisi, Chiara Civello and Dalida.

== Charts ==
Chart (1971)	Peak position
Argentina (CAPIF)	1
Italy (Musica e dischi)	1
Mexico (Radio Mil)	1
Spain (AFYVE)	12

== Track listing ==
=== Nicola Di Bari Version ===
7" single – PM 3575

1. "Il cuore è uno zingaro" (Franco Migliacci, Claudio Mattone)
2. "Agnese" (Nicola Di Bari)

=== Nada Version ===
7" single – PM 3576

1. "Il cuore è uno zingaro" (Franco Migliacci, Claudio Mattone)
2. "Insieme Mai" (Franco Migliacci, Claudio Mattone)

== See also ==
- List of number-one hits of 1971 (Mexico)
