= Questi pazzi, pazzi italiani =

- Directed by: Tullio Piacentini
- Music by: Federico Zanni
- Release date: 1965
- Running time: 85 minutes
- Country: Italy
- Language: Italian

Questi pazzi, pazzi italiani is a 1965 Italian "musicarello" film directed by Tullio Piacentini.

== Plot ==
The film takes place in Ferrari, Italy about two young pizza chefs named Mario and Luigi that traverse all around the town looking for a lost violin. Throughout the film, they meet characters that assist them on the journey leading them throughout town realizing that despite the loss of their violin, they find themselves and who they really are.

== Cast ==
- Fred Bongusto
- Beppe Cardile
- Gigliola Cinquetti
- Petula Clark as Herself
- Nicola Di Bari
- Peppino Di Capri
- Sergio Endrigo
- Paolo Ferrara
- Antonietta Fiorito as Storyteller (voice)
- Ricky Gianco
- Enzo Jannacci
- Roberto Murolo
- Diego Peano
- Pino Presti
- Tony Rossi
- Nini Rosso
- Edoardo Vianello
- Henry Wright
