= 4/3/1943 =

Single by Lucio Dalla

from the album Storie di casa mia
- B-side: "Il fiume e la città"
- Released: 1971
- Genre: Canzone d'autore
- Label: RCA Italiana

Lucio Dalla singles chronology
"Sylvie" (1970)	"4/3/1943" (1971)	"La casa in riva al mare" (1971)

Audio
- "4/3/1943" on YouTube

"4/3/1943", also spelled "4 marzo 1943" ('4 March 1943'), is a 1971 song composed by Lucio Dalla and Paola Pallottino. The song ranked third at the 21st edition of the Sanremo Music Festival, in a double performance by Lucio Dalla and Equipe 84.

== Background ==
The song was composed by Dalla and Pallottino during a trip to the Tremiti Islands.

After some successful live performances, RCA Italiana decided to present the song at the Sanremo Music Festival, where it was initially rejected. It was eventually picked up by a special "committee of renovation" formed by Age, Alberto Bevilacqua, Vittorio Caprioli, Tonino Cervi, Fernando Chiglia, Sergio Corbucci, Mario Landi, Ubaldo Lay, and Piero Vivarelli, who was in charge of choosing four songs worthy of being added to the festival for their artistic relevance.

As the Sanremo Festival rules prescribed the song being presented in a double performance, various partners for Dalla were tested, including Bobby Solo and Edoardo De Angelis. Dalla's first choice was Duilio Del Prete, who ultimately was not allowed to participate due to his contractual obligations with Johnny Dorelli's stage company.

== Lyrics ==
The lyrics tell the story of a man, nicknamed "Gesù Bambino" (Baby Jesus) in spite of his well-known vices, who was born from the brief relationship between an American soldier, temporarily in Italy because of World War II, and an ingenous 16-year-old girl who soon left him an orphan.

Originally titled "Gesùbambino", its title was changed upon suggestion of producer Ruggero Cini in "4/3/1943", the birth date of Dalla, as to suggest an autobiographical assonance with the lyrics. Sanremo organizers and RAI also forced further modifications of some verses which were considered blasphemous, so "giocava alla Madonna con il bimbo da fasciare" ('played at being the Madonna with the baby to swaddle') was turned into "giocava a far la donna con il bimbo da fasciare" ("played at being a woman with a baby to swaddle"), while "e ancora adesso che gioco a carte e bevo vino, per la gente del porto mi chiamo Gesù Bambino" ('and even now that I play cards and drink wine, to the people of the port I am known as the Baby Jesus') originally was "e anche adesso che bestemmio e bevo vino, per ladri e puttane sono Gesù Bambino" ('and even now that I swear and drink wine, thieves and whores call me Baby Jesus').

== Release ==
The song premiered at the Sanremo Music Festival 1971, in a double performance by Lucio Dalla and Equipe 84. Dalla performed it accompanied by violinist Renzo Fontanella. It marked the first major commercial success of Dalla, whose version of the song topped the hit parade and sold over 500,000 copies.

== Other versions ==
The song was adapted in French by Pierre Delanoë and recorded by Dalida with the title "Jésus bambino". Chico Buarque adapted the song in Portuguese as "Minha história". Artists who covered the song also include Maria Bethânia, Ney Matogrosso, Francesco De Gregori, Mino Reitano, Maria Farantouri, Agnaldo Rayol, Oswaldo Montenegro, Fafá de Belém, Flamingokvintetten, Passengers, Lara Saint Paul, Piergiorgio Farina.

== Track listing ==
No.	Title	Writer(s)	Length
1.	"4/3/1943"	Lucio Dalla, Paola Pallottino	3:40
2.	"Il fiume e la città"	Sergio Bardotti, Lucio Dalla, Armando Franceschini	3:48

== Charts ==
Lucio Dalla version

Chart (1971)	Peak position
Italy (Musica e dischi)	1

Chart (2012)	Peak position
Italy (FIMI)	6

Equipe 84 version

Chart (1971)	Peak position
Italy (Musica e dischi)	17
