= I Camaleonti =

Italian pop group

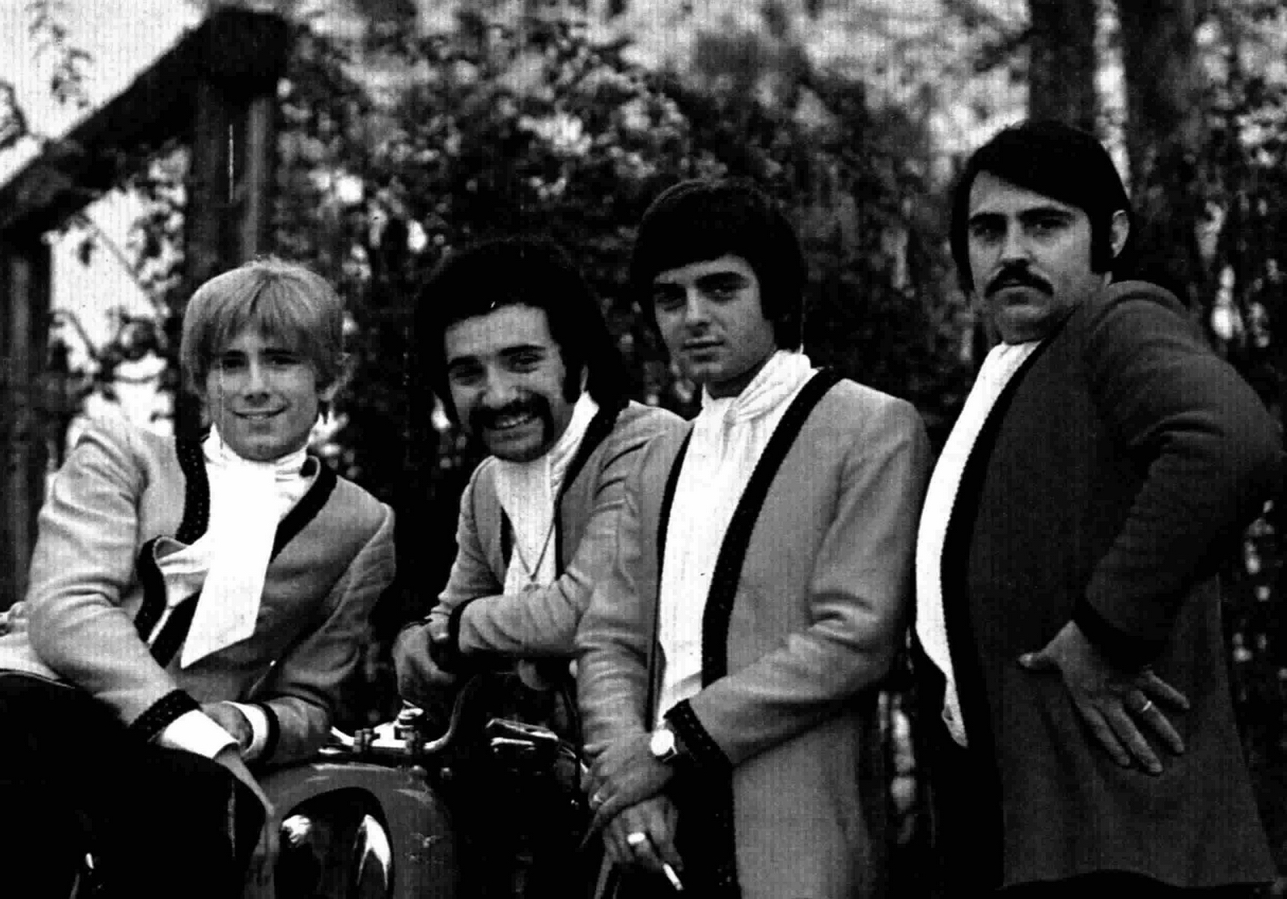
I Camaleonti, c. 1964. (l-r) Gerry Manzoli, Paolo de Ceglie, Antonio "Tonino" Cripezzi, Livio Macchia

I Camaleonti ("The Chameleons") are an Italian pop group from Milan, mostly successful between the late 1960s and the early 1970s.

== Background ==
I Camaleonti were formed in 1963 in Milan. The original line-up included Livio Macchia (guitar), Antonino Cripezzi (keyboards), Paolo de Ceglie (drums) and Gerardo Manzoli (bass). In 1965 the band's line-up was augmented with the arrival of Riki Maiocchi on vocals and guitar. The band's first hit was called "Sha-La-La-La (La-La-La-La-La)", and coincided with the popularity of the beat genre.

In 1966, vocalist and guitarist Riki Maiocchi left the group to pursue a solo career and was replaced by Mario Lavezzi. With Lavezzi on board, the group gradually began to switch to a more melodic pop sound, soon achieving success with a modern rendition of a popular 1935 tune penned by Cesare Andrea Bixio and Michele Galdieri, "Portami tante rose".

Between 1968 and 1973 I Camaleonti had four singles topping the Italian charts, including "Applausi", "Io per lei" and "L'ora dell'amore". Between 1970 and 1993 they entered the Sanremo Music Festival five times, (the last time along with Dik Dik and Equipe 84's lead singer Maurizio Vandelli), finishing third in 1979 with "Quell'attimo in più". Despite numerous line-up changes. The band performed its final concert on 30 June 2025, with Livio Macchia and Dave Sumner, to celebrate the end of their career and the group's 60 years of activity.

== Members ==
- Livio Macchia: vocals, guitar (1963–2025; died 2025)
- Antonio "Tonino" Cripezzi: vocals, keyboards (1963–2022; died 2022)
- Paolo de Ceglie: drums (1963–2004; died 2004)
- Gerardo "Gerry" Manzoli: bass (1963–1982)
- Dave Sumner: guitar (1969–2025)
- Riki Maiocchi: vocals, guitar (1965–1966; died 2004)
- Mario Lavezzi: vocals, guitar (1966–1968)
- Gabriele Lorenzi: keyboards (1967–1968)
- Vincenzo Mancuso: guitar, flute (1981–1984)
- Massimo Brunetti: keyboards, flute (1990–2024; died 2024)

== Discography ==
=== Studio albums ===
- 1966 – The Best Records in The World
- 1967 – Portami tante rose
- 1968 – Io per lei
- 1969 – Vita d'uomo (EP)
- 1973 – I magnifici Camaleonti
- 1974 – Amicizia e amore
- 1975 – Piccola Venere ed altri successi
- 1976 – Che aereo stupendo… la speranza
- 1977 – In vendita
- 1979 – ...e camminiamo
- 1993 – Come passa il tempo e i più grandi successi
- 1996 – Libero
- 1997 – Applausi ed altri successi
- 2001 – 2001 ed oltre
- 2004 – 40 anni di musica e applausi
- 2006 – Storia
- 2010 – Camaleonti Live

== See also ==
- Beat music
- Sanremo Music Festival
- Italian pop music
