= Il primo giorno di primavera =

Single by Dik Dik
- B-side: "Nuvola bianca"
- Released: 1969
- Genre: Pop-Rock
- Label: Ricordi
- Songwriter(s): Mario Lavezzi, Cristiano Minellono, Mogol
- Producer(s): Lucio Battisti, Mogol

Dik Dik singles chronology
"Zucchero" (1969)	"Il primo giorno di primavera" (1969)	"Primavera primavera" (1969)

Audio
- "Il primo giorno di primavera" on YouTube

"Il primo giorno di primavera" (literally "The first day of spring") is a 1969 song composed by Mario Lavezzi, Cristiano Minellono and Mogol and performed by the musical group Dik Dik.

The song was one of the band's major hits, its lyrics were praised by critics for their realism and for their original vocabulary, while the music and the arrangements reprised the style and the structure of Procol Harum's "A Whiter Shade of Pale", of whom Dik Dik had previously led to success with an Italian language cover, "Senza luce". The song marked the debut as composer of Mario Lavezzi.

== Track listing ==
7" single – SRL 10-540

1. "Il primo giorno di primavera" (Mario Lavezzi, Cristiano Minellono, Mogol)
2. "Nuvola Bianca" (Giancarlo Sbriziolo, Mario Totaro)

== Charts ==
Chart	Peak position
Italy	1
