= Gens (band) =

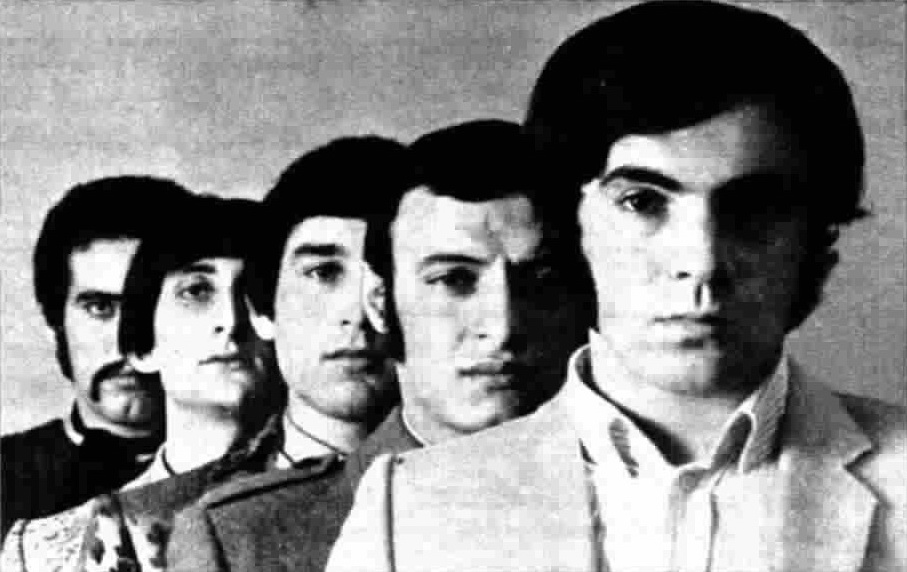
- Gens in Radiocorriere magazine, 1969.

Background information
- Origin: Messina, Italy
- Genres: Beat; Pop
- Years active: 1967-1974; 1990-1992
- Labels: Philips Records; Det; Amico

Gens, also spelled as I Gens, was an Italian pop band best known for the songs "In fondo al viale" and "Per chi".

== Career ==
The group formed in Messina in 1967 as a beat group, and gradually moved to a more melodic style. They became first known in 1968 for winning a musical contest, the Trofeo EuroDavoli with the song "In fondo al viale", which eventually was a sleeper hit and sold over 250,000 copies. In 1969 their guitarist Gilberto Bruno, aged 23 years old, died in a car accident and was replaced by Mauro Culotta. The same year they participated to the Cantagiro Festival, placing third with "In fondo al viale".

The band was entered into the main competition at the 20th and 21st editions of the Sanremo Music Festival, with the songs "La stagione di un fiore" and "Lo schiaffo". Between 1971 and 1972 the lead singer Filiberto "William" Ricciardi temporarily left the band, being replaced by Alberto Tadini, who recorded the singles "Lo schiaffo" and "Piccolo grande amore".

In 1972 the band got their major hit with the single "Per chi", a cover version of Badfinger's song "Without You". The song won the bands competition at the 1972 Cantagiro Festival, and ranked #7 on the Italian hit parade.

The group disbanded in 1974. After the dissolution of the band Ricciardi founded the group Opera, while the bassist Ettore Cardullo and the keyboardist Pippo Landro formed the band La Nuova Gente. The group briefly reformed in the early 1990s, with Enrico Bianchi replacing Ricciardi as lead vocalist.

== Discography ==
Album

- 1974 - Gens (Philips, 6323 031)

Singles

- 1968 - "In fondo al viale" (Det, dtp 40)
- 1969 - "Insieme a lei" (Det, dtp 47)
- 1970 - "La stagione di un fiore" (Det, dtp 53)
- 1970 - "Ancora e sempre" (Det, dtp 56)
- 1971 - "Lo schiaffo" (Amico, ZSLF 50168)
- 1972 - "Piccolo grande amore" (Amico, ZSLF 50272)
- 1972 - "Per chi" (Philips, 6025 056)
- 1972 - "Anche un fiore lo sa" (Philips, 6025 072)
- 1973 - "Cara amica mia" (Philips, 6025 089)
- 1974 - "Quanto freddo c'è (negli occhi tuoi)" (Philips, 6025 112)
- 1974 - "L'uomo nasce" (Philips, 6025 125)
