= Applausi =

1968 song by I Camaleonti

Single by I Camaleonti
- B-side: "Torna Liebelei"
- Released: 1968
- Genre: Pop-Rock
- Label: CBS
- Songwriter(s): Claudio Cavallaro, Luciano Beretta

I Camaleonti singles chronology
"Punto bianco" (1968)	"Applausi" (1968)	"Viso d'angelo" (1969)

Audio
- "Applausi" on YouTube

"Applausi" is a 1968 song composed by Claudio Cavallaro and Luciano Beretta and performed by the musical group I Camaleonti. One of the band's major hits, the song consists of the alternating between soul-style vocal cues and choral moments.

== Track listing ==
7" single – CBS 3654

1. "Applausi" (Claudio Cavallaro, Luciano Beretta)
2. "Torna Liebelei" (Daniele Pace, Gene Colonnello, Mario Panzeri)

== Charts ==
Chart	Peak position
Italy	1
