= Claudio Mattone =

Italian composer, lyricist and publisher

Claudio Mattone (born 28 February 1943) is an Italian composer, lyricist and music producer.

Born in Santa Maria a Vico, Caserta, Mattone approached music at young age, as a jazz pianist. After leaving the university he moved to Rome, where he debuted in 1968 as a singer-songwriter with the song "E' sera", that premiered without any success at Cantagiro '68. Focusing on composition, between late sixties and early eighties he successfully teamed with the lyricist Franco Migliacci and signed several hits, contributing to launch the careers of Nada and Eduardo De Crescenzo; also working as music producer and as lyricist of his songs, in nineties Mattone launched the careers of Neri per caso and Syria, that respectively won the 1994 and 1995 editions of the Sanremo Music Festival in the "giovani" category.

In 1990 Mattone won a David di Donatello and a Nastro d'Argento for the soundtrack of the 1989 film Street Kids. His earlier scores had included Cugini carnali (1974), Così parlò Bellavista (1984), Il mistero di Bellavista (1985) and Fatto su misura (1985). From 2000s his principal occupation is the theater, as author and producer of musicals.
