= List of number-one hits of 1964 (Mexico) =

This is a list of the songs that reached number one in Mexico in 1964, according to Billboard magazine with data provided by Audiomusica.

== Chart history ==
Issue date	Song	Artist(s)	Ref.
January 4	"Parabá Papá"	Rocío Dúrcal	
January 11	"Parabá Papá"	Rocío Dúrcal	
January 18	"Magia blanca"	Los Hermanos Carrión	
February 1	"Magia blanca"	Los Hermanos Carrión	
February 8	"If I Had a Hammer"	Trini López	
February 15	"Dominique"	Las Hermanas Alegrìa/Los Dominic's/Angélica María/Sor Sonrisa	
February 22	"Dominique"	Las Hermanas Alegrìa/Los Dominic's/Angélica María/Sor Sonrisa	
February 29	"Dominique"	Las Hermanas Alegrìa/Los Dominic's/Angélica María/Sor Sonrisa	
March 7	"Dominique"	Las Hermanas Alegrìa/Los Dominic's/Angélica María/Sor Sonrisa	
March 14	"Dominique"	Las Hermanas Alegrìa/Los Dominic's/Angélica María/Sor Sonrisa	
March 21	"Dominique"	Las Hermanas Alegrìa/Los Dominic's/Angélica María/Sor Sonrisa	
March 28	"Entrega total"	Javier Solís	
April 4	"Entrega total"	Javier Solís	
April 11	"Entrega total"	Javier Solís	
April 18	"If I Had a Hammer"	Trini López	
April 25	"Las cerezas"	Los Hermanos Carrión	
May 2	"Las cerezas"	Los Hermanos Carrión	
May 9	"Las cerezas"	Los Hermanos Carrión	
May 30	"Las cerezas"	Los Hermanos Carrión	
June 6	"Entrega total"	Javier Solís	
June 13	"Tijuana"	The Persuaders	
June 20	"Tijuana"	The Persuaders	
June 27	"Tijuana"	The Persuaders	
July 4	"Tijuana"	The Persuaders	
July 11	"Tijuana"	The Persuaders	
July 18	"Tijuana"	The Persuaders	
July 25	"Tijuana"	The Persuaders	
August 1	"Tijuana"	The Persuaders	
August 8	"Tijuana"	The Persuaders	
August 15	"Tijuana"	The Persuaders	
August 22	"Tijuana"	The Persuaders	
August 29	"Tijuana"	The Persuaders	
September 5	"Tijuana"	The Persuaders	
September 12	"Tijuana"	The Persuaders	
September 19	"Tijuana"	The Persuaders	
September 26	"Tijuana"	The Persuaders	
October 3	"Tijuana"	The Persuaders	
October 10	"Cómo te extraño, mi amor"	Leo Dan	
October 17	"Cómo te extraño, mi amor"	Leo Dan	
October 24	"Cómo te extraño, mi amor"	Leo Dan	
October 31	"Cómo te extraño, mi amor"	Leo Dan	
November 7	"Cómo te extraño, mi amor"	Leo Dan	
November 14	"Cómo te extraño, mi amor"	Leo Dan	
November 21	"Cómo te extraño, mi amor"	Leo Dan	
November 28	"Cómo te extraño, mi amor"	Leo Dan	
December 5	"Cómo te extraño, mi amor"	Leo Dan	
December 12	"Cómo te extraño, mi amor"	Leo Dan	
December 19	"La pollera colorá"	Carmen Rivero y su Conjunto	
December 26	"La pollera colorá"	Carmen Rivero y su Conjunto	

=== By country of origin ===
Number-one artists:

Country of origin	Number of artists	Artists
Mexico	5	Los Hermanos Carrión
Mexico	5	Los Dominic's
Mexico	5	Angélica María
Mexico	5	Javier Solís
Mexico	5	Carmen Rivero y su Conjunto
United States	2	Trini López
United States	2	The Persuaders
Spain	1	Rocío Dúrcal
Belgium	1	Sor Sonrisa
Argentina	1	Leo Dan

Number-one compositions (it denotes the country of origin of the song's composer[s]; in case the song is a cover of another one, the name of the original composition is provided in parentheses):

Country of origin	Number of compositions	Compositions
United States	3	"Magia blanca" ("Devil Woman")
United States	3	"If I Had a Hammer"
United States	3	"Tijuana Surf"
Spain	1	"Parabá papá"
Belgium	1	"Dominique"
Italy	1	"Las cerezas" ("Le ciliege")
Mexico	1	"Entrega total"
Argentina	1	"Cómo te extraño, mi amor"
Colombia	1	"La pollera colorá"

== See also ==
- 1964 in music

== Sources ==
- Print editions of the Billboard magazine from January 4 to December 26, 1964.
