= Mario Lavezzi =

Italian singer and composer (born 1948)

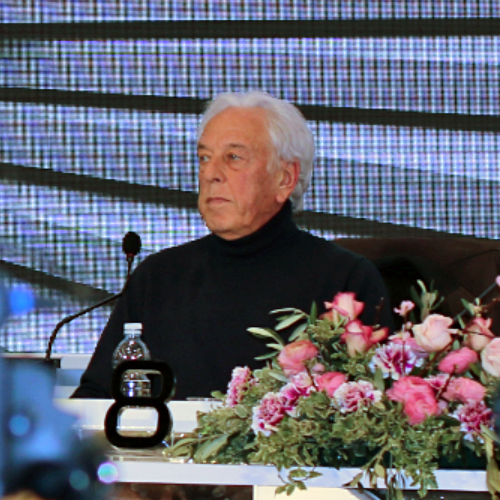
- Lavezzi at the Sanremo Music Festival 2018
- Born: Bruno Mario Lavezzi; 8 May 1948 (age 78); Milan, Italy
- Occupations: Singer; songwriter; composer; record producer

Bruno Mario Lavezzi (born 8 May 1948) is an Italian singer-songwriter, composer, record producer and guitarist.

== Life and career ==
Born in Milan, he studied piano and guitar at the Scuola Civica di Milano. He started his career in 1963, as the singer and guitarist for the band The Trappers. In 1966, following the dissolution of the band, he replaced Riki Maiocchi in the I Camaleonti until 1968, when he had to leave the band after being drafted into the Italian army. In 1969 he debuted as a composer with the Dik Dik hit "Il primo giorno di primavera". In 1970 he co-founded the pop-rock group Flora Fauna e Cemento, then in 1974 he was part of the progressive rock musical project Il Volo. In the second half of the 1970s Lavezzi started a solo career as singer-songwriter; he also started collaborating as a composer and a record producer for several albums of Loredana Bertè. He later wrote songs for many notable artists, including Lucio Dalla, Gianni Morandi, Anna Oxa, Spagna, Marcella Bella, Ornella Vanoni, Fiorella Mannoia, and scored the 1984 Carlo Vanzina comedy film Amarsi un po', which starred Tahnee Welch.

Lavezzi is the uncle of Italo-disco one hit wonder Diana Est.

== Discography ==
Albums

- 1974 - Il Volo
- 1976 - Iaia
- 1978 - Filobus
- 1979 - Cartolina
- 1983 - Agrodolce
- 1984 - Guardandoti, sfiorandoti
- 1991 - Voci
- 1993 - Voci 2
- 1997 - Voci e chitarre
- 1999 - Senza catene
- 2004 - Passionalità
- 2009 - A più voci
- 2011 - L'amore è quando c'è
