= Nicola Di Bari =

Italian singer-songwriter (born 1940)

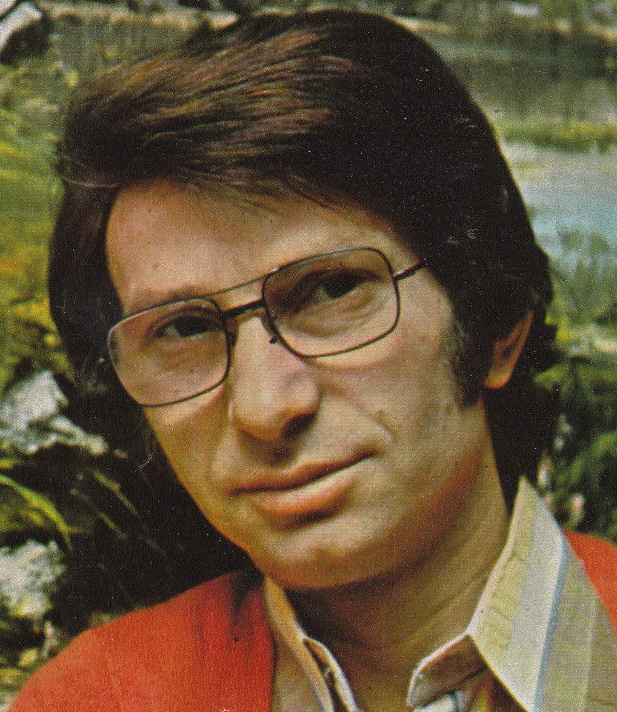
- Di Bari in 1973
- Born: Michele Scommegna; 29 September 1940 (age 86); Zapponeta, Apulia, Kingdom of Italy
- Occupations: Singer; songwriter; actor
- Years active: 1959–present

Michele Scommegna (born 29 September 1940), known professionally as Nicola Di Bari, is an Italian singer-songwriter and former actor. He is considered among the main figures of Italian classical pop music.

== Life and career ==
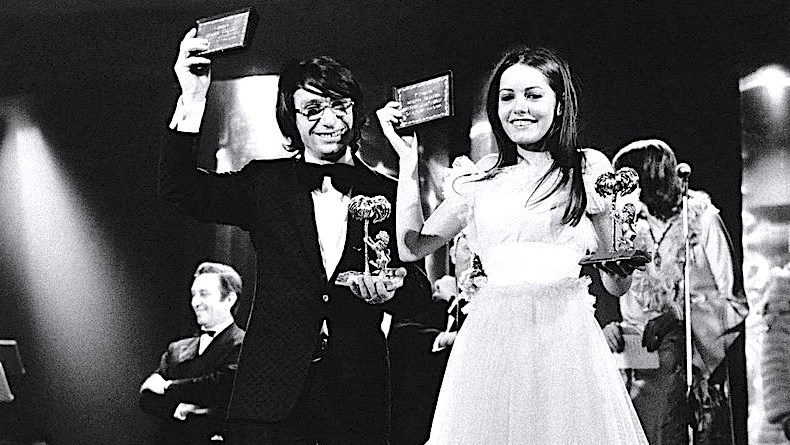
Nicola Di Bari and Nada celebrate their victory at the Sanremo Music Festival 1971

Born in Zapponeta, in the region of Apulia, Di Bari was the youngest of ten children from a farming family. He gave up his accountancy studies to work in Rome, and after a short stay there he moved to Milan. In 1962, in Cologno Monzese, he won a song contest with a song of which he was also the author, "Piano pianino". In 1964 he achieved his first commercial success with the song "Amore ritorna a casa". In 1965, 1966, and 1967 he entered the competition at three editions of the Sanremo Music Festival, coupled with Gene Pitney.

In 1970 Di Bari obtained even greater commercial and critical success with the song "La prima cosa bella", which ranked second at the Sanremo Music Festival 1970 and first on the Italian hit charts. In 1971, he won the Sanremo Music Festival and Canzonissima, with the songs "Il cuore è uno zingaro" (jointly with Nada) and "Chitarra suona più piano". In 1972, he again won the Sanremo Festival and represented Italy at the Eurovision Song Contest with the song "I giorni dell'arcobaleno" ("The Days of the Rainbow"). In the following years, Di Bari grew his international popularity, especially in Latin America, where he recorded several albums in Spanish and where he gradually focused his career.

== Selected discography ==
=== Albums ===
- 1965 Nicola Di Bari (Jolly records, LPJ 5041)
- 1970 Nicola Di Bari (RCA, PSL 10464)
- 1971 Nicola Di Bari (RCA, PSL 10494)
- 1971 Nicola di Bari canta Luigi Tenco (RCA, PSL 10520)
- 1972 I giorni dell'arcobaleno (RCA, PSL 10533)
- 1973 Paese (RCA, PSL 10571)
- 1973 Un altro Sud (RCA, DPSL 10597)
- 1973 La colomba di carta (RCA, TPL1-1043)
- 1974 Ti fa bella l'amore (RCA, TPL1-1104)
- 1977 Nicola Di Bari (Carosello, CLN 25068)
- 1981 Passo dopo passo (WEA, T 58327)
- 1982 L'amore è... (Carosello, CLN 25096)
- 1985 Innamorarsi (CBS, 57047)
- 1987 Encanto (CBS DIL, 11350)

=== Singles ===
- 1963 "Piano... pianino.../Perché te ne vai" (Jolly, J 20217)
- 1964 "Amore ritorna a casa/Senza motivo" (Jolly, J 20229)
- 1964 "Non farmi piangere più/Ti tendo le braccia" (Jolly, J 20255)
- 1965 "Tu non potrai capire/Una cosa di nessuna importanza" (Jolly, J 20280)
- 1965 "Amici miei/Amo te, solo te" (Jolly, J 20282)
- 1965 "Piangerò/Il rimpianto" (Jolly, J 20294)
- 1965 "Un amore vero/Non sai come ti amo" (Jolly, J 20331)
- 1966 "Lei mi aspetta/Ridi con me" (Jolly, J 20346)
- 1967 "Guardati alle spalle/Judy" (Jolly, J 20406)
- 1968 "Se mai ti parlassero di me/Giramondo" (RCA, PM 3416)
- 1968 "Il mondo è grigio, il mondo è blu/Solo ciao" (RCA, PM 3448)
- 1969 "Eternamente/La vita e l'amore" (RCA, PM 3488)
- 1970 "La prima cosa bella/...e lavorare" (RCA, PM 3510)
- 1970 "Vagabondo/La mia donna" (RCA, PM 3531)
- 1970 "Una ragazzina come te/Zapponeta" (RCA, PM 3554)
- 1971 "Il cuore è uno zingaro/Agnese" (RCA, PM 3575)
- 1971 "Anima/Pioverà pioverà" (RCA, Pl 1)
- 1971 "Un uomo molte cose non le sa/Sogno di primavera" (RCA, PM 3611)
- 1971 "Chitarra suona più piano/Lontano, lontano" (RCA, PM 3627)
- 1972 "I giorni dell'arcobaleno/Era di primavera" (RCA, PM 3639)
- 1972 "Occhi chiari/Un minuto... una vita" (RCA, PM 3673)
- 1972 "Paese/Qualche cosa di più" (RCA, PM 3693)
- 1974 "Sai che bevo, sai che fumo/Libertà" (RCA, TPBO 1121)
- 1975 "Beniamino/Tema di Beniamino" (RCA, TPBO 1150)
- 1976 "La più bella del mondo/Anna, perché" (Carosello, Cl 20415)
- 1976 "E ti amavo/Momento" (Carosello, Cl 20435)
- 1977 "Lei, mia/Favole" (Carosello, Cl 20450)
- 1979 "Chiara/Partire perché" (VIP, 10205)
- 1982 "Innamorati noi/Solamente una vez" (Carosello, Cl 20510)
- 1983 "Vorrei/Sono triste" (Polydor, 815 409-7)

=== CDs ===
- 1995 Il meglio di Nicola Di Bari ("The Best of Nicola di Bari"), (DV More Records, DV 5874)
- 1999 I più grandi successi ("The Greatest Hits"), (Duck Records)

== Selected filmography ==
=== Actor ===
- I ragazzi dell'Hully Gully ("The kids of hully gully"), directed by Marcello Giannini (1964)
- Questi pazzi, pazzi italiani ("These crazy, crazy Italians"), dir. by Tullio Piacentini (1965)
- Viale della canzone ("Song Avenue"), dir. by Tullio Piacentini (1965)
- Altissima pressione ("Ultimate pressure"), dir. by Enzo Trapani (1965)
- L'immensità (La ragazza del Paip's) ("Immensity – The girl of the Paip's"), dir. by Oscar De Fina 1967
- The Most Beautiful Couple in the World (1968)
- La ragazza del prete ("The girl of the preacher man"), dir. by Domenico Paolella 1970
- Torino nera ("Black Turin"), dir. by Carlo Lizzani (1972)

=== Soundtrack composer ===
- Preparati la bara! ("You'd Better Smile"), dir. Ferdinando Baldi by (1968)
- Torino nera ("Black Turin"), dir. by Carlo Lizzani (1972)

Awards and achievements
Preceded by Adriano Celentano & Claudia Mori with "Chi non lavora non fa l'amore"	Sanremo Music Festival; Winner; 1971	Succeeded by Nicola Di Bari with "I giorni dell'arcobaleno"
Preceded by Massimo Ranieri with "Vent'anni"	Winner of Canzonissima; 1971	Succeeded by Massimo Ranieri with "Erba di casa mia"
Preceded by Nicola Di Bari & Nada with "Il cuore è uno zingaro"	Sanremo Music Festival; Winner; 1972	Succeeded by Peppino di Capri with "Un grande amore e niente più"
Preceded by Massimo Ranieri with "L'amore è un attimo"	Italy in the Eurovision Song Contest; 1972	Succeeded by Massimo Ranieri with "Chi sarà con te"
