= Nada (Italian singer) =

Italian singer (born 1953)

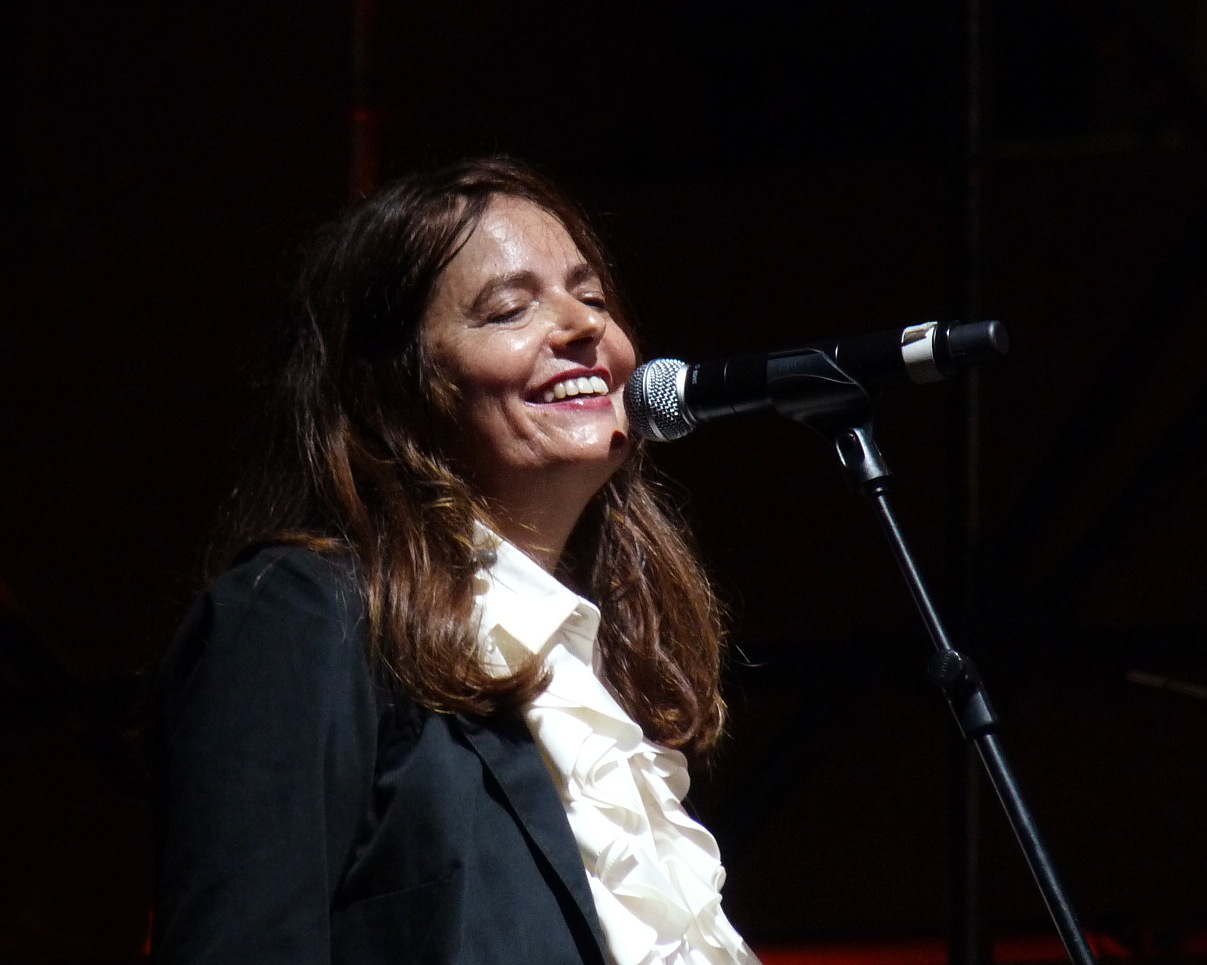
- Nada in concert in 2009

Background information
- Born: Nada Malanima; 17 November 1953 (age 72); Gabbro, Rosignano Marittimo, Tuscany, Italy
- Genres: Pop; rock
- Occupations: Singer; songwriter; actress
- Instrument: Vocals
- Years active: 1969–present

Nada Malanima (born 17 November 1953), known mononymously as Nada, is an Italian singer-songwriter and actress. She was nicknamed Il pulcino del Gabbro ("The little chick of Gabbro").

== Career ==
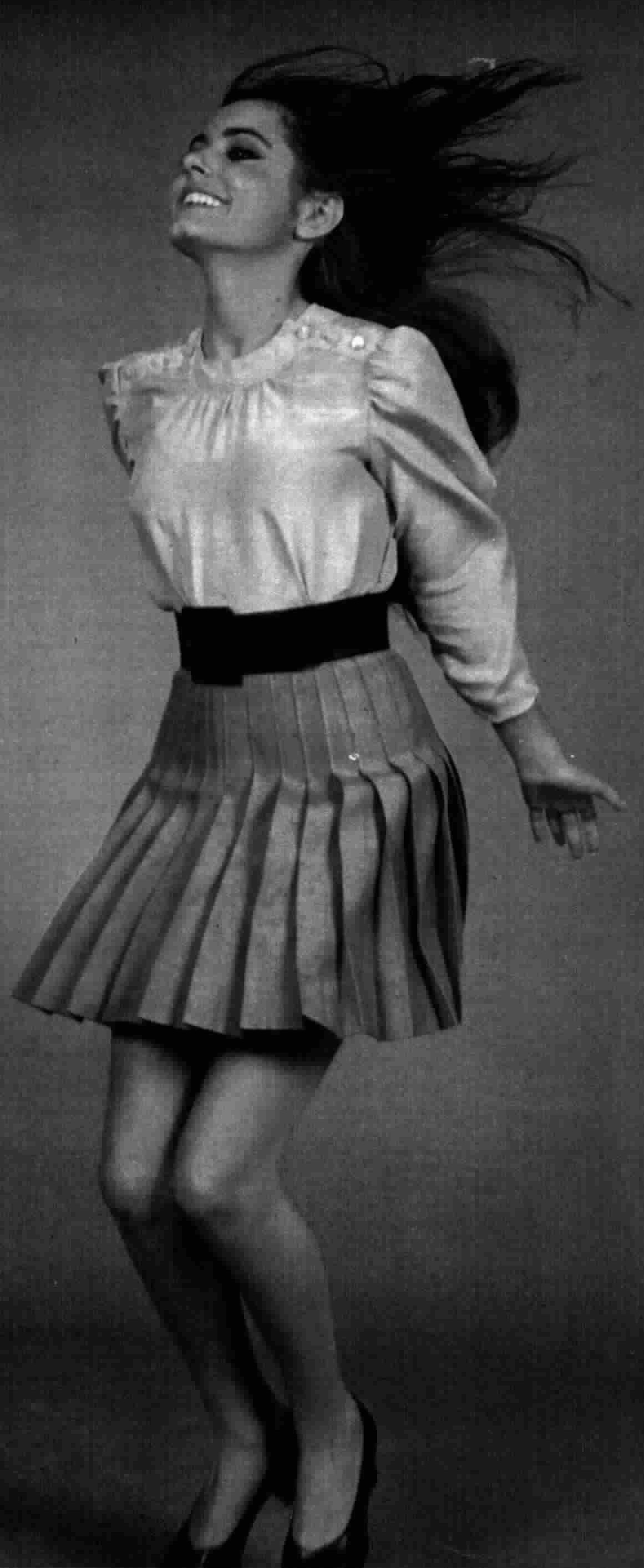
Nada in 1972

Nada's début occurred at the age of fifteen at the 1969 Sanremo Music Festival with the song Ma che freddo fa, which gave her a sudden success, also with the Spanish language version Hace frío ya. The following year she participated in the festival again, singing Pa' diglielo a ma' together with Ron. She also took part in Canzonissima, a popular TV programme, with Che male fa la gelosia.

In 1971, she won the Sanremo Music Festival with Il cuore è uno zingaro, together with Nicola Di Bari, obtaining notable international success. In Sanremo again in 1972, she was third with Il re di denari. Later she returned to Sanremo in 1987 (Bolero), in 1999 (Guardami negli occhi) and in 2007 (Luna in piena).

In 1983, she was voted "singer of the year" with her summer hit Amore disperato. In 1998 the Italian band Super B gained a notable success with a cover of Nada's song Amore Disperato.

Her 2004 album Tutto l'amore che mi manca (produced by John Parish, former producer of PJ Harvey) was awarded as best independent album of the year in Italy. The album also contains a duet with Howe Gelb. Also the following studio album Luna in piena won the award for best independent album in 2007.

On 21 June 2009, Nada participated in the Amiche per l'Abruzzo concert at San Siro in Milan, a line-up of all female Italian stars organised by Laura Pausini to raise money to help the city of L'Aquila, devastated by the earthquake earlier on that year. Nada joined a special project band consisting of Marina Rei, Paola Turci and Carmen Consoli on stage for the final song of the first part, singing a rousing rendition of her classic Ma che freddo fa.

In 2011, she released her new studio album Vamp.

In 2016, her single "Senza un perché" was featured on the HBO series The Young Pope.

== Discography ==
=== Studio albums ===
- 1969 - Nada
- 1970 - Io l'ho fatto per amore
- 1973 - Ho scoperto che esisto anch'io
- 1974 - 1930: Il domatore delle scimmie
- 1976 - Nada
- 1983 - Smalto
- 1984 - Noi non cresceremo mai
- 1986 - Baci Rossi
- 1992 - L'anime nere
- 1999 - Dove sei sei
- 2001 - L'amore è fortissimo e il corpo no
- 2004 - Tutto l'amore che mi manca
- 2007 - Luna In Piena #54 ITA
- 2011 - Vamp #70 ITA
- 2014 - Occupo poco spazio
- 2016 - L'amore devi seguirlo
- 2019 - È un momento difficile, tesoro
- 2022 - La paura va via da sé se i pensieri brillano
- 2025 - Nitrito

=== Live albums ===
- 1998 - Nada Trio
- 2005 - L'Apertura (Nada & Massimo Zamboni)
- 2005 - CD Live Brescia ("Mucchio Selvaggio Extra" supplement)
- 2008 - Live Stazione Birra #60 ITA

=== Compilations ===
- 1994 - Malanima: Successi e Inediti 1969-1994
- 2006 - Le mie canzoncine 1999-2006

=== Singles ===
- 1969 - Les bicyclettes de Belsize
- 1969 - Ma che freddo fa #1 ITA
- 1969 - Biancaneve #23 ITA
- 1969 - Che male fa la gelosia #6 ITA
- 1969 - L'anello #11 ITA
- 1970 - Pà diglielo a mà #10 ITA
- 1970 - Bugia #52 ITA
- 1970 - Io l'ho fatto per amore #47 ITA
- 1971 - Il cuore è uno zingaro #1 ITA
- 1972 - Re di denari #2 ITA
- 1972 - Una chitarra e un'armonica #24 ITA
- 1973 - Brividi d'amore #27 ITA
- 1978 - Pasticcio universale #37 ITA
- 1981 - Dimmi che mi ami che mi ami che tu ami che tu ami solo me #15 ITA
- 1982 - Ti stringerò #17 ITA
- 1983 - Amore disperato #5 ITA
- 1984 - Balliamo ancora un po' #35 ITA
- 1987 - Bolero
- 1992 - Guarda quante stelle
- 1999 - Guardami negli occhi
- 1999 - Inganno
- 2004 - Senza un perché
- 2004 - Piangere o no
- 2006 - Scalza
- 2007 - Luna in piena #76 ITA
- 2007 - Pioggia d'estate
- 2008 - Stretta
- 2008 - Novembre
- 2011 - Il comandante perfetto
- 2011 - La canzone per dormire
- 2011 - Stagioni
- 2015 - Non sputarmi in faccia
- 2015 - La bestia

== Filmography ==
Films, television and stage roles
| Year | Title | Role | Notes |
|---|---|---|---|
| 1973 | Puccini | Doria Manfredi | Miniseries |
| 1974 | L'acqua cheta | Anita | Filmed stage musical |
| 1977 | The Diary of Anne Frank | Anne Frank | Italian stage tour |
| 1990 | Il segreto dell'uomo solitario | Ghiana | Film |
| 1994 | With Closed Eyes | Singer | Film; performing soundtrack with "Nati alberi" |
| 2008 | La natura delle cose | Narrator | Stage ballet |
| 2008 | Detesto l'elettronica stop | Woman at phone | Film |
| 2013 | Una mamma imperfetta | Herself | Web-series; cameo appearance |

== Books ==
- 2003 - Le mie madri
- 2008 - Il mio cuore umano
- 2012 - La grande casa

Awards and achievements
| Preceded by Adriano Celentano & Claudia Mori with "Chi non lavora non fa l'amore" | Sanremo Music Festival; Winner; 1971 | Succeeded by Nicola Di Bari with "I giorni dell'arcobaleno" |
