= Equipe 84 =

Italian beat band from Modena (1964–1977; 1984–2012)

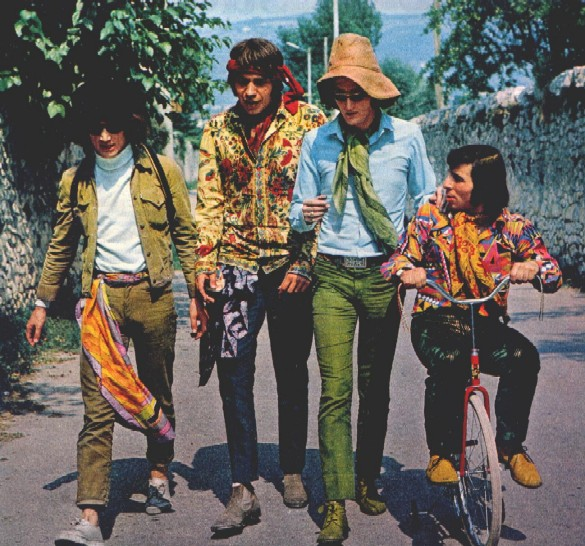
- Equipe 84 in the 1960s (left to right): Franco Ceccarelli, Victor Sogliani, Maurizio Vandelli, Alfio Cantarella

Background information
- Origin: Modena, Italy
- Genres: Beat; pop
- Years active: 1964–1977; 1984–2012
- Labels: Vedette; Ricordi; BMG; Ariston
- Past members: Maurizio Vandelli; Franco Ceccarelli; Victor Sogliani; Alfio Cantarella

Equipe 84 (Italian pronunciation: [eˈkipp otˌtantaˈkwattro]) were an Italian beat band formed in 1964 in Modena. The name was originally suggested by a friend of the band, Pier Farri. Equipe was thought to be a word that would resonate more easily outside of their home country, and though the origin of 84 is unclear, it is presumed to have been the total age of the members of the band at the moment of its inception.

Originally formed by Maurizio Vandelli (vocals, guitar), Victor Sogliani (bass), Alfio Cantarella (drums) and Franco Ceccarelli (guitar), Equipe 84 recorded their debut album in 1965 with the label Vedette, before signing a more lucrative agreement with Dischi Ricordi. From 1966 Equipe 84 scored a number of hit singles in the Italian charts, including "29 settembre" and "Io ho in mente te" (an Italian rendition of the folk duo Ian & Sylvia's "You Were on My Mind"). In 1967, the band was featured in Mariano Laurenti's film I ragazzi di bandiera gialla.

In 1970, Ceccarelli left the band to pursue a solo career. In the same year Cantarella was charged with possession of illegal drugs – a predicament that would keep him away from the band for two years. After hiring temporary replacements in the form of keyboardist Dario Baldan Bembo and PFM drummer Franz Di Cioccio, Vandelli and Sogliani embarked on an ambitious project, recording the strongly influenced prog-rock album ID and briefly changing the name of the band to Nuova Equipe 84. In 1973, with the return of Cantarella, the band left Dischi Ricordi and signed for Alfredo Rossi's label Ariston Records, returning to a more conventional sound with the album Dr. Jekyll & Mr. Hyde. The band, however, stirred further controversy with the single "Clinica Fior di Loto", a blatant invitation to vote for the Italian Socialist Party at the upcoming general elections.

Following a decline in popularity, Equipe 84 officially disbanded in 1977. In the mid-1980s, Sogliani and Ceccarelli attempted a short-lived reunion of the original members, which resulted in the band's final album, Un amore vale l'altro (1989).

== Personnel ==
- Maurizio Vandelli (1963–1977): lead vocals, guitar, keyboards
- Victor Sogliani (1963–1977 and 1984–1995): vocals, bass
- Alfio Cantarella (1963–1970 and 1973–1977): drums
- Franco Ceccarelli (1963–1970 and 1984–2012): vocals, guitar
- Mike Shepstone (1970): drums
- Franz Di Cioccio (1970–1971): drums
- Ruggero Stefani (1972): drums
- Paolo Siani (1976–1977): drums
- Dario Baldan Bembo (1970–1972): keyboards
- Gagliardone Thomas (1972–1977): keyboards
- Roberto Poltronieri (1995–2006): bass

== Discography ==
Albums

- 1965 - Equipe 84 (Vedette, VPA 8051)
- 1966 - Io ho in mente te (Dischi Ricordi, MRL 6053)
- 1968 - Stereoequipe (Dischi Ricordi, SMRL 6060)
- 1970 - ID (Dischi Ricordi, SMRL 6072)
- 1971 - Casa mia (Dischi Ricordi, SMRL 6086)
- 1973 - Dr. Jekyll & Mr. Hyde (Ariston Records, Ar 12107)
- 1974 - Sacrificio (Ariston Records, Ar 12134)
- 1989 - Un amore vale l'altro (Rose Red, Rose 5031)

Singles

- 1964 - "Liberi d'amare" / "Canarino va"
- 1964 - "Papà e mammà" / "Quel che ti ho dato"
- 1965 - "Ora puoi tornare" / "Prima di cominciare"
- 1965 - "Notte senza fine" / "Se credi a quello che..."
- 1965 - "La fine del libro" / "Cominciamo a suonare le chitarre"
- 1965 - "Sei già di un altro" / "La den da da"
- 1965 - "Liberi d'amare" / "Non guardarmi così"
- 1966 - "Un giorno tu mi cercherai" / "L'antisociale"
- 1966 - "Mi fai bene" / "Goodbye My Love"
- 1966 - "Io ho in mente te" / Resta"
- 1966 - "Bang Bang" / "Auschwitz"
- 1967 - "29 September" / "E' dall'amore che nasce l'uomo"
- 1967 - "Nel cuore, nell'anima" / "Ladro"
- 1968 - "Un anno" / "Nel ristorante di Alice"
- 1968 - "Un angelo blu" / "Nella terra dei sogni"
- 1969 - "Tutta mia la città" / "Cominciava così"
- 1969 - "Pomeriggio: ore 6" / "E poi..."
- 1970 - "Il sapone, la pistola, la chitarra e altre meraviglie" / "Devo andare"
- 1971 - "4 Marzo 1943" / "Padre e figlio"
- 1971 - "Casa mia" / "Buffa"
- 1971 - "Una giornata al mare" / "Quel giorno"
- 1971 - "Pullman" / "Non si può"
- 1973 - "Diario" / "Senza senso"
- 1973 - "Clinica Fior di Loto" / "Meglio"
- 1974 - "Mercante senza fiori" / "Sigaretta e via"
- 1974 - "Risvegliarsi un mattino" / "Se c'è"
- 1975 - "sogni senza fine" / "Mediazione"
- 1975 - "Vai, amore vai" / "Mr. Playboy"
- 1977 - "Opera d'amore" / "Anguilla Rock"
- 1989 - "La lunga linea retta" / "Rosa"

== Bibliography ==
- Franco Ceccarelli, Io ho in mente te: Storia dell'Equipe 84, Zelig, Bologna, 1996
