= Dik Dik =

Italian pop rock band

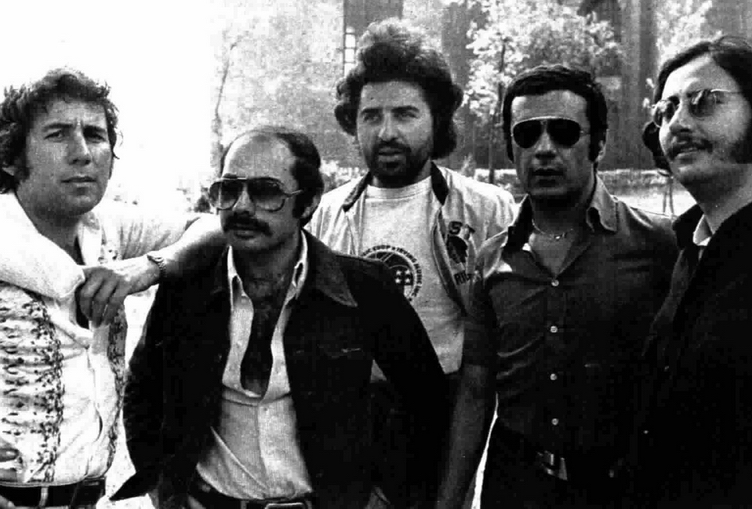
- Dik Dik in 1975

Background information
- Origin: Milan, Italy
- Genres: Pop
- Years active: 1965–present
- Labels: Ricordi; Ri-Fi; Ariston; Durium; Lupus; Numero Uno; Five: Carosello
- Website: www.dikdik.it

Dik Dik is an Italian beat/pop-rock band, named after the antelope Dik-dik, formed in the 1960s and still active. They were most popular in the late 1960s, when they released a string of hit singles with the contribution of renowned lyric-writer Mogol and songwriter Lucio Battisti, their greatest successes being "Sognando la California" and "Senza luce", respectively covers of "California Dreamin'" by the Mamas and Papas and "A Whiter Shade of Pale" by Procol Harum. While their early production is mostly inspired by the Beatles, in the 1970s they also experimented in other genres, including progressive rock. They went on hiatus in the 1980s but later returned to the scene, mostly in revival television shows and live performances.

== History ==
Dik Dik formed in Milan in 1965. The original line-up included Giancarlo Sbriziolo (aka Lallo) on vocals and bass, Pietro Montalbetti (aka Pietruccio) on guitar, Erminio Salvaderi (aka Pepe) on guitar, Sergio Panno on drums and Mario Totaro on keyboards. Their first single, 1-2-3, was a cover version of the song by Len Barry. Their second single, Sognando la California, was released in October 1966 and ended up topping the Italian charts for two months. Dik Dik subsequently released a string of successful singles, mostly a mix of original compositions and Italian renditions of popular songs by other artists, including Il mondo è con noi (1966), Inno (1967, cover of Let's go to San Francisco by The Flower Pot Men), Senza luce (1967, cover of A Whiter Shade of Pale by Procol Harum), Il vento (1968), and Il primo giorno di primavera (1969). In 1969 they performed with Rita Pavone at the Sanremo Music Festival. Other singles released in the following years include L'isola di Wight (1970), Vendo casa (1972), Storia di periferia (1973), Help Me (1974), and Volando (1975, a cover of Sailing by Rod Stewart).

Their long-playing albums were not commercially successful. Their first three releases, largely collections of their singles, were published in 1967, 1969, and 1970 respectively. In 1972 the band recorded the first proper studio album, Suite per una donna assolutamente relativa ("Suite for an absolutely relative woman"), which was an experiment in progressive rock. Suite was conceived as a concept album about the feminine universe, with lyrics by artist and poet Herbert Pagani; it was very different from Dik Dik's previous production, and was somehow rejected by their audience, resulting in a commercial flop. As a consequence, the band thereafter returned to their earlier pop-beat style.

From the mid-1970s to the early 1980s the band experienced several personnel changes, with Panno and Totaro leaving in 1974 (replaced by Roberto "Hunka Munka" Carlotto on keyboards and Nunzio "Cucciolo" Favia on drums), and Sbriziolo leaving in 1978 (replaced by two guitarists, Roberto "Roby" Facini and Rosario Brancati). In 1980 Carlotto was replaced by keyboard virtuoso Joe Vescovi, who had been collaborating with the band since 1974. Dik Dik's alienation of the mainstream audience continued with ambitious sonic experiments such as I'te vurria vasà (1976), which drastically departed from Dik Dik's traditional sound, and also with the advent of disco music, which caused the decline of several pop-rock bands.

After a couple of relatively successful singles, such as Laser vivente (1980) and Giornale di bordo (1982), the band went on hiatus. Pietruccio, Pepe, and Lallo eventually reconvened and released a few more singles such as L'amico mio (1983) and Senza luce... reggae (1984), and participated in the Musicaitalia per l'Etiopia humanitarian project for Ethiopia.

In 1986, Favia and Carlotto gave life to a spin-off of the band, originally named "Carlotto e Cucciolo già Dik Dik", which led to a legal quarrel about the ownership of the "Dik Dik" brand. The dispute went on until 2006, when the name "Dik Dik" was finally given to Pietruccio, Pepe, and Lallo while Favia and Carlotto were allowed to perform under the name "Già Dik Dik" ("Ex Dik Dik").

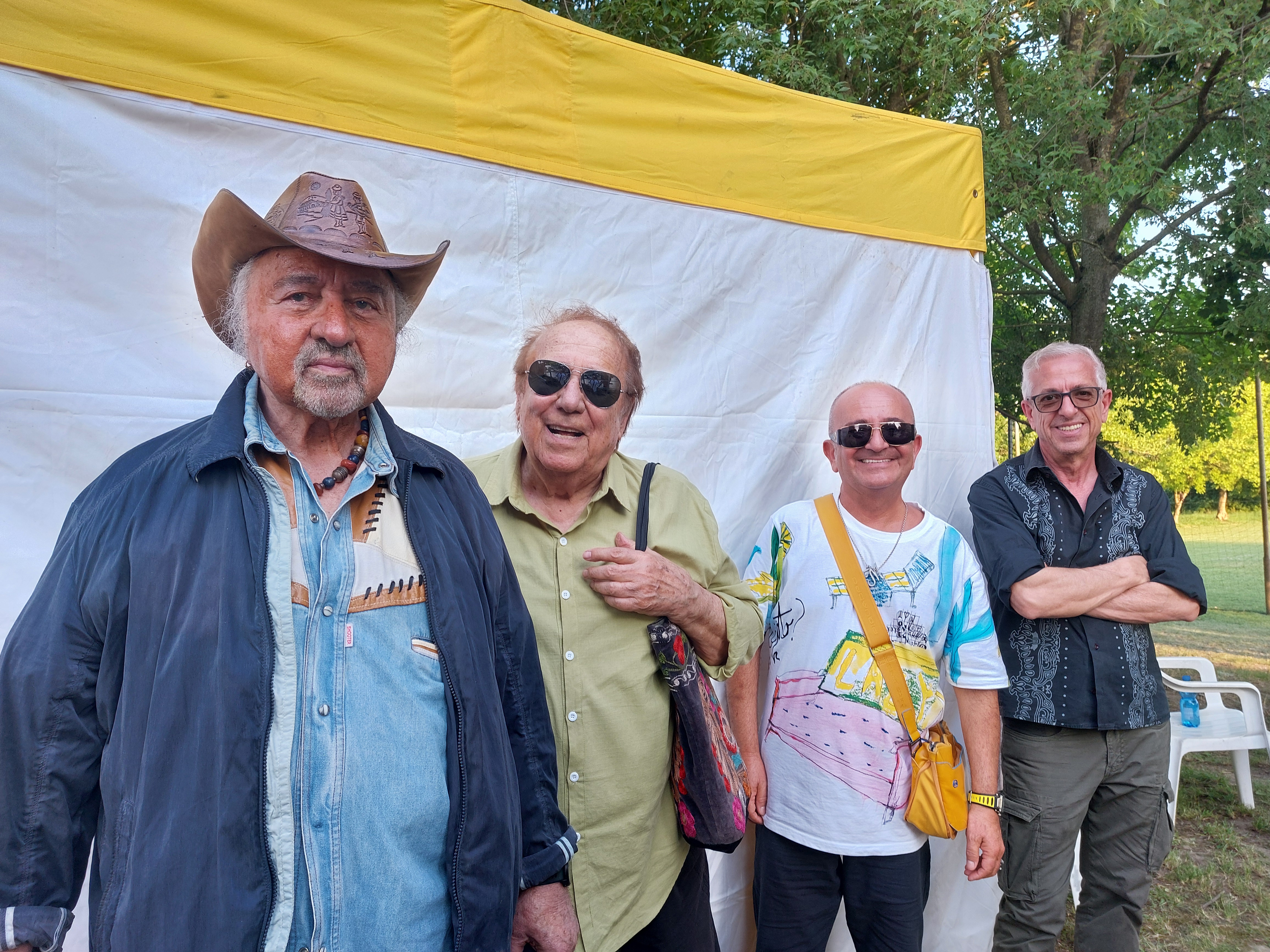
Dik Dik, during the Casellandia music festival, in Caselle Landi, on 1st June 2026

From the second half of the 1980s, Dik Dik returned to the scenes participating in popular music revival television shows such as Una rotonda sul mare. In 1993 they performed again at the Sanremo Festival together with former rivals I Camaleonti, another band from the 1960s-1970s Italian scene, and Maurizio Vandelli from Equipe 84.

Dik Dik are still occasionally performing. In 1997 they started their own website..

In 2010, Pietruccio has published an autobiographical book about the history of the band, I ragazzi della via Stendhal ("The Via Stendhal Boys", a reference to Molnár's novel "The Paul Street Boys" as well as a reference to the street where Lallo and Pietruccio grew up in Milan).

In November 2020, Pepe Salvaderi died because of COVID-19 complications.

In 2021, they released their last studio album "Una vita d'avventura" (An adventurous life) which contains six new songs and new recordings of five of the band's evergreen. The album is also the last performance by Pepe Salvaderi before his death.

== Personnel ==
- Giancarlo "Lallo" Sbriziolo: vocals, bass, guitar (1965–present)
- Pietro "Pietruccio" Montalbetti: lead guitar, vocals, bass (1965–present)

=== Support musicians ===
- Gaetano Rubino: drums
- Mauro Gazzola: keyboards

=== Past members ===
- Erminio "Pepe" Salvaderi: Guitar, vocals (1965-died 2020)

== Past members ==
- Mario Totaro: keyboards (1965–1974)
- Sergio Panno: drums (1965–1974)
- Nunzio "Cucciolo" Favia: drums (1974–1982)
- Roberto "Hunka Munka" Carlotto: keyboards (1974–1977)
- Roberto "Roby" Facini: vocals, guitar (1977–1982)
- Rosario Brancati: guitar (1978–1982)
- Joe Vescovi: keyboards (1978–2007, died 2014)
- Erminio "Pepe" Salvaderi: rhythm guitar, keyboards, vocals (1965–2020, born 194?, Milan died 19 December 2020, Milan)

== Discography ==
=== Albums ===
- Dik Dik (1967, Dischi Ricordi)
- Il primo giorno di primavera e altri successi (1969, Dischi Ricordi)
- Suite per una donna assolutamente relativa (1972, Dischi Ricordi)
- Storie e confessioni (1973, Dischi Ricordi)
- Volando (1976, Ri-Fi)
- Amico (1978, Ri-Fi)
- Live (1989, Durium)
- Come fossero farfalle (1991, Carosello)
- Come passa il tempo e i più grandi successi (1993, Dischi Ricordi)
- Isole in viaggio (1997, Duck Records)
- Sogno Beat (2000, Duck Records)
- L'isola di Wight e altri successi (2000, MBO Music)
- Uno in più e i grandi successi beat (2000, MBO Music)
- Ingresso gratuito (2003, Dik Dik Records)
- Sold Out (2008, Dik Dik Records)

=== Singles ===
- 1-2-3/Se rimani con me (1966, Dischi Ricordi)
- Sognando la California/Dolce di giorno (1966, Dischi Ricordi)
- Il mondo è con noi/Se io fossi un falegname (1967, Dischi Ricordi)
- Guardo te e vedo mio figlio/Senza luce (1967, Dischi Ricordi)
- Inno/Windy (1967, Dischi Ricordi)
- Il vento/L'esquimese (1968, Dischi Ricordi)
- Dimenticherai/Eleonora credi (1968, Dischi Ricordi)
- Zucchero/Piccola arancia (1969, Dischi Ricordi)
- Il primo giorno di primavera/Nuvola bianca (1969, Dischi Ricordi)
- Primavera primavera/Sogni proibiti (1969, Dischi Ricordi)
- Io mi fermo qui/Restare bambino (1970, Dischi Ricordi)
- L'isola di Wight/Innamorato (1970, Dischi Ricordi)
- Vivo per te/Quattro bicchieri di vino (1970, Dischi Ricordi)
- Vivo per te/Dove vai (1970, Dischi Ricordi)
- Ninna nanna (Cuore mio)/Incantesimo (1970, Dischi Ricordi)
- Vendo casa/Paura (1971, Dischi Ricordi)
- Viaggio di un poeta/Oggi no (1972, Dischi Ricordi)
- Il cavallo, l'aratro e l'uomo/Senza luce (1972, Dischi Ricordi)
- Storia di periferia/Libero (1973, Dischi Ricordi)
- Il confine/Ma perché (1973, Dischi Ricordi)
- Help Me/Sono nato (1974, Dischi Ricordi)
- Piccola mia/Uno strano sentimento (1975, Dischi Ricordi)
- Volando/Ossessioni (1975, Dik Dik Records)
- I' te vurria vasà/Come una bambina (1976, Dik Dik Records)
- Un giorno, cento anni/Flowers freedom and love (1977, Dik Dik Records)
- Io, te e l'infinito/Walking in the Sunshine (1977, Dik Dik Records)
- Amico/Senza di te (1978, Ri-Fi)
- Strani fili/Hard Stuff (1978, Ariston Records)
- Dimenticare Venezia/Sentimento (1979, Ariston Records)
- Laser vivente/Dolce amara tu (1980, Ariston Records)
- Vuoto a rendere/Mamamadama (1980, Ariston Records)
- Giornale di bordo (1982, Lupus)
- L'amico mio/Compagnia (1983, Numero Uno)
- Senza luce...reggae/Alza la vela al vento (1984, Five Record)
- Un giorno d'amore/Primo round (1985, Durium)
- Quando verrà Natale/L'isola di Wight (1990, Carosello)
