= Franco Migliacci =

Italian lyricist and actor (1930–2023)

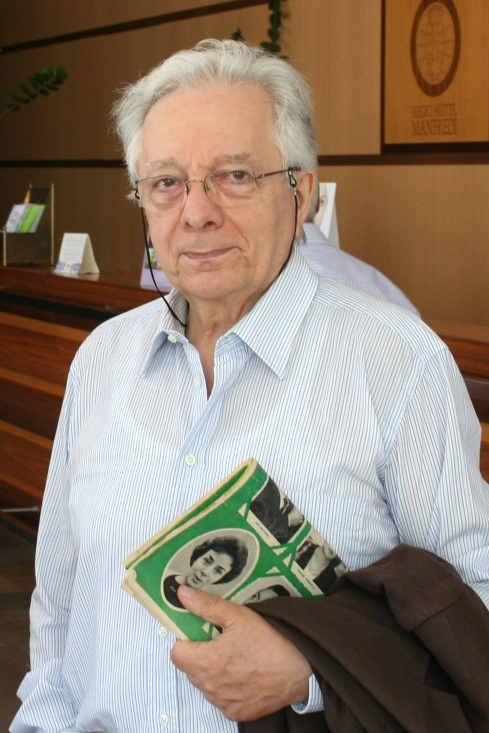
- Migliacci in 2010

Background information
- Born: Francesco Migliacci; 28 October 1930; Mantua, Italy
- Died: 15 September 2023 (aged 92) Rome, Italy

Francesco "Franco" Migliacci (Italian pronunciation: [ˈfraŋko miʎˈʎattʃi]; 28 October 1930 – 15 September 2023) was an Italian lyricist, producer, and actor.

== Biography ==
Migliacci studied in Florence where his family had settled, here he entered in a competition for young players, in which he won a stay of three days to Cinecittà and a modest role in a film by Nino Taranto.

After this, he moved to Rome and the world of cinema where he worked in small parts in about 18 films.

In 1958, with Domenico Modugno, Migliacci co-authored the song "Nel blu, dipinto di blu", also known as "Volare", which has become one of the most well-known Italian songs in the world. While the words of the title, "in the blue, painted blue," seem to make no sense, they actually do when one understands the inspiration for the song came out of a wine fueled vision of Franco's combining his memory of two Marc Chagall paintings and himself painted blue with the ability to fly.

Afterward, he worked in drama series for television and several radio plays. He was then the illustrator for The Pioneer children's magazine directed by Gianni Rodari.

Migliacci died on 15 September 2023, at the age of 92.

== Filmography ==
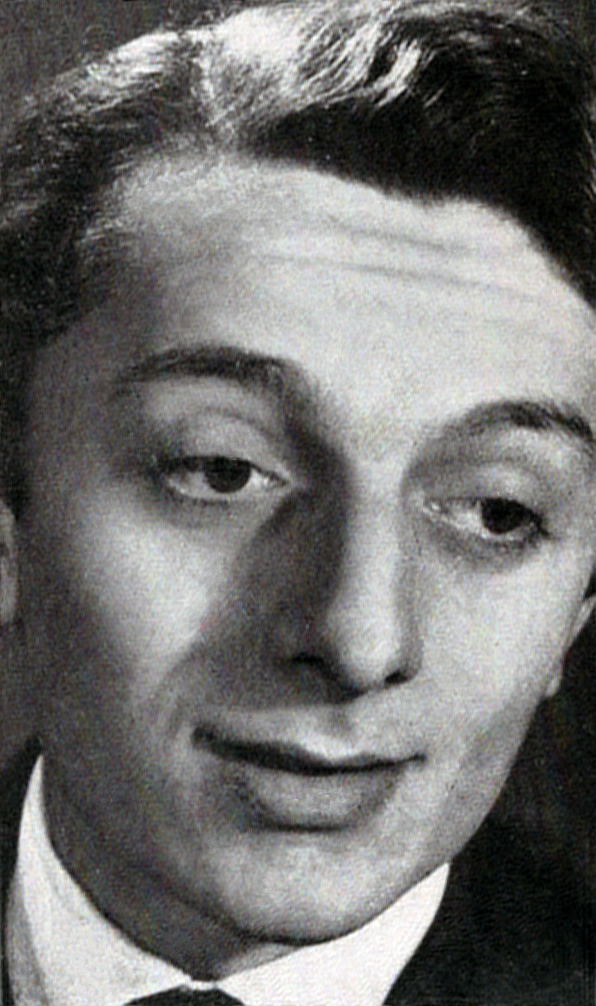
Franco Migliacci from the cover of the Cineguida magazine (1953)

- Viale della speranza, directed by Dino Risi (1952)
- Carica eroica, directed by Francesco De Robertis (1952)
- Amori di mezzo secolo, directed by Pietro Germi (1953)
- Ci troviamo in galleria, directed by Mauro Bolognini (1953)
- L'arte di arrangiarsi, directed by Luigi Zampa (1954)
- Non scherzare con le donne, directed by Giuseppe Bennati (1955)
- Serenata al vento, directed by Luigi De Marchi (1956)
- Noi siamo le colonne, directed by Luigi Filippo D'Amico (1956)
- Una voce una chitarra un po' di luna, directed by Giacomo Gentilomo (1956)
- Ho amato una diva, directed by Luigi De Marchi (1957)
- Vivendo cantando che male ti fò?, directed by Marino Girolami (1957)
- Giovane canaglia, directed by Giuseppe Vari (1958)
- Ladro lui, ladra lei, directed by Luigi Zampa (1958)
- Nel blu dipinto di blu, directed by Piero Tellini (1959)
- Tutto è musica, directed by Domenico Modugno (1963), soggetto e sceneggiatura
- Per amore... per magia..., directed by Duccio Tessari (1967), sceneggiatura
- Heidi a scuola, directed by Isao Takahata (1972), musiche
