= List of number-one hits of 1974 (Italy) =

This is a list of the number-one hits of 1974 on Italian Hit Parade Singles Chart.

Issue date	Song	Artist
January 5	"La collina dei ciliegi"	Lucio Battisti
January 12	"La collina dei ciliegi"	Lucio Battisti
January 19	"La collina dei ciliegi"	Lucio Battisti
January 26	"La collina dei ciliegi"	Lucio Battisti
February 2	"Alle porte del sole"	Gigliola Cinquetti
February 9	"Alle porte del sole"	Gigliola Cinquetti
February 16	"Alle porte del sole"	Gigliola Cinquetti
February 23	"Alle porte del sole"	Gigliola Cinquetti
March 2	"Alle porte del sole"	Gigliola Cinquetti
March 9	"Alle porte del sole"	Gigliola Cinquetti
March 16	"Alle porte del sole"	Gigliola Cinquetti
March 23	"Alle porte del sole"	Gigliola Cinquetti
March 30	"Alle porte del sole"	Gigliola Cinquetti
April 6	"A blue shadow"	Berto Pisano
April 13	"A blue shadow"	Berto Pisano
April 20	"A blue shadow"	Berto Pisano
April 27	"A blue shadow"	Berto Pisano
May 4	"A blue shadow"	Berto Pisano
May 11	"A blue shadow"	Berto Pisano
May 18	"A blue shadow"	Berto Pisano
May 25	"A blue shadow"	Berto Pisano
June 1	"A blue shadow"	Berto Pisano
June 8	"A blue shadow"	Berto Pisano
June 15	"A blue shadow"	Berto Pisano
June 22	"A blue shadow"	Berto Pisano
June 29	"A blue shadow"	Berto Pisano
July 6	"A blue shadow"	Berto Pisano
July 13	"Piccola e fragile "	Drupi
July 20	"Piccola e fragile "	Drupi
July 27	"E tu"	Claudio Baglioni
August 3	"Piccola e fragile "	Drupi
August 10	"E tu"	Claudio Baglioni
August 17	"E tu"	Claudio Baglioni
August 24	"E tu"	Claudio Baglioni
August 31	"E tu"	Claudio Baglioni
September 7	"E tu"	Claudio Baglioni
September 14	"E tu"	Claudio Baglioni
September 21	"E tu"	Claudio Baglioni
September 28	"E tu"	Claudio Baglioni
October 5	"E tu"	Claudio Baglioni
October 12	"E tu"	Claudio Baglioni
October 19	"E tu"	Claudio Baglioni
October 26	"Bella senz'anima"	Riccardo Cocciante
November 2	"Bella senz'anima"	Riccardo Cocciante
November 9	"Bella senz'anima"	Riccardo Cocciante
November 16	"Bella senz'anima"	Riccardo Cocciante
November 23	"Bella senz'anima"	Riccardo Cocciante
November 30	"Bella senz'anima"	Riccardo Cocciante
December 7	"Bella senz'anima"	Riccardo Cocciante
December 14	"Bellissima"	Adriano Celentano
December 21	"Bellissima"	Adriano Celentano
December 28	"Bellissima"	Adriano Celentano

== Number-one artists ==
Position	Artist	Weeks #1
1	Berto Pisano	14
2	Claudio Baglioni	12
3	Gigliola Cinquetti	9
4	Riccardo Cocciante	7
5	Lucio Battisti	4
6	Adriano Celentano	3
6	Drupi	3

== See also ==
- 1974 in music
