= List of number-one hits of 1964 (Italy) =

This is a list of the number-one hits of 1964 on Italian Hit Parade Singles Chart.

| Indicates best-performing single of 1964 |

| Issue date | Song | Artist |
|---|---|---|
| January 4 | "Sabato triste" | Adriano Celentano |
| January 11 | "Non è facile avere 18 anni" | Rita Pavone |
| January 18 | "O mio signore" | Edoardo Vianello |
| January 25 | "O mio signore" | Edoardo Vianello |
| February 1 | "Che m'importa del mondo" | Rita Pavone |
| February 8 | "Please Please Me" | The Beatles |
| February 15 | "Una lacrima sul viso" | Bobby Solo |
| February 22 | "Quando vedrai la mia ragazza" | Gene Pitney |
| February 29 | "Una lacrima sul viso" | Bobby Solo |
| March 7 | "Una lacrima sul viso" | Bobby Solo |
| March 14 | "Una lacrima sul viso" | Bobby Solo |
| March 21 | "Una lacrima sul viso" | Bobby Solo |
| March 28 | "Una lacrima sul viso" | Bobby Solo |
| April 4 | "Una lacrima sul viso" | Bobby Solo |
| April 11 | "Una lacrima sul viso" | Bobby Solo |
| April 18 | "Non ho l'età" | Gigliola Cinquetti |
| April 25 | "Non ho l'età" | Gigliola Cinquetti |
| May 2 | "È l'uomo per me" | Mina |
| May 9 | "È l'uomo per me" | Mina |
| May 16 | "È l'uomo per me" | Mina |
| May 23 | "È l'uomo per me" | Mina |
| May 30 | "Cin, cin" | Richard Anthony |
| June 6 | "Cin, cin" | Richard Anthony |
| June 13 | "Cin, cin" | Richard Anthony |
| June 20 | "Cin, cin" | Richard Anthony |
| June 27 | "Cin, cin" | Richard Anthony |
| July 4 | "Cin, cin" | Richard Anthony |
| July 11 | "Sei diventata nera" | Los Marcellos Ferial |
| July 18 | "In ginocchio da te" | Gianni Morandi |
| July 25 | "In ginocchio da te" | Gianni Morandi |
| August 1 | "In ginocchio da te" | Gianni Morandi |
| August 8 | "In ginocchio da te" | Gianni Morandi |
| August 15 | "In ginocchio da te" | Gianni Morandi |
| August 22 | "In ginocchio da te" | Gianni Morandi |
| August 29 | "In ginocchio da te" | Gianni Morandi |
| September 5 | "In ginocchio da te" | Gianni Morandi |
| September 12 | "In ginocchio da te" | Gianni Morandi |
| September 19 | "In ginocchio da te" | Gianni Morandi |
| September 26 | "In ginocchio da te" | Gianni Morandi |
| October 3 | "In ginocchio da te" | Gianni Morandi |
| October 10 | "In ginocchio da te" | Gianni Morandi |
| October 17 | "In ginocchio da te" | Gianni Morandi |
| October 24 | "In ginocchio da te" | Gianni Morandi |
| October 31 | "In ginocchio da te" | Gianni Morandi |
| November 7 | "In ginocchio da te" | Gianni Morandi |
| November 14 | "La mia festa" | Richard Anthony |
| November 21 | "La mia festa" | Richard Anthony |
| November 28 | "La mia festa" | Richard Anthony |
| December 5 | "La mia festa" | Richard Anthony |
| December 12 | "La mia festa" | Richard Anthony |
| December 19 | "Non son degno di te" | Gianni Morandi |
| December 26 | "Non son degno di te" | Gianni Morandi |

== See also ==
- 1964 in music
- List of number-one hits in Italy
