= List of number-one hits of 1990 (Italy) =

This is a list of the number-one hits of 1990 on Italian Hit Parade Singles Chart.

| Issue Date | Song | Artist(s) |
|---|---|---|
| January 6 | "Lambada" | Kaoma |
| January 13 | "Lambada" | Kaoma |
| January 20 | "Lambada" | Kaoma |
| January 27 | "Lambada" | Kaoma |
| February 3 | "Lambada" | Kaoma |
| February 10 | "Un'estate italiana" | Edoardo Bennato, Gianna Nannini |
| February 17 | "Un'estate italiana" | Edoardo Bennato, Gianna Nannini |
| February 24 | "Un'estate italiana" | Edoardo Bennato, Gianna Nannini |
| March 3 | "Un'estate italiana" | Edoardo Bennato, Gianna Nannini |
| March 10 | "Nothing Compares 2 U" | Sinéad O'Connor |
| March 17 | "Vattene amore" | Amedeo Minghi, Mietta |
| March 24 | "Vattene amore" | Amedeo Minghi, Mietta |
| March 31 | "Vattene amore" | Amedeo Minghi, Mietta |
| April 7 | "Vattene amore" | Amedeo Minghi, Mietta |
| April 14 | "Vattene amore" | Amedeo Minghi, Mietta |
| April 21 | "Vattene amore" | Amedeo Minghi, Mietta |
| April 28 | "Vattene amore" | Amedeo Minghi, Mietta |
| May 5 | "Vattene amore" | Amedeo Minghi, Mietta |
| May 12 | "Vogue" | Madonna |
| May 19 | "Vogue" | Madonna |
| May 26 | "Vattene amore" | Amedeo Minghi, Mietta |
| June 2 | "Vattene amore" | Amedeo Minghi, Mietta |
| June 9 | "Un'estate italiana" | Edoardo Bennato, Gianna Nannini |
| June 16 | "Un'estate italiana" | Edoardo Bennato, Gianna Nannini |
| June 23 | "Un'estate italiana" | Edoardo Bennato, Gianna Nannini |
| June 30 | "Un'estate italiana" | Edoardo Bennato, Gianna Nannini |
| July 7 | "Un'estate italiana" | Edoardo Bennato, Gianna Nannini |
| July 14 | "Un'estate italiana" | Edoardo Bennato, Gianna Nannini |
| July 21 | "Un'estate italiana" | Edoardo Bennato, Gianna Nannini |
| July 28 | "Un'estate italiana" | Edoardo Bennato, Gianna Nannini |
| August 4 | "Un'estate italiana" | Edoardo Bennato, Gianna Nannini |
| August 11 | "Un'estate italiana" | Edoardo Bennato, Gianna Nannini |
| August 18 | "Un'estate italiana" | Edoardo Bennato, Gianna Nannini |
| August 25 | "Un'estate italiana" | Edoardo Bennato, Gianna Nannini |
| September 1 | "Sotto questo sole" | Francesco Baccini, Ladri di Biciclette |
| September 8 | "Sotto questo sole" | Francesco Baccini, Ladri di Biciclette |
| September 15 | "Sotto questo sole" | Francesco Baccini, Ladri di Biciclette |
| September 22 | "Sotto questo sole" | Francesco Baccini, Ladri di Biciclette |
| September 29 | "Sotto questo sole" | Francesco Baccini, Ladri di Biciclette |
| October 6 | "Sotto questo sole" | Francesco Baccini, Ladri di Biciclette |
| October 13 | "Sotto questo sole" | Francesco Baccini, Ladri di Biciclette |
| October 20 | "Scandalo" | Gianna Nannini |
| October 27 | "Scandalo" | Gianna Nannini |
| November 3 | "I'm Your Baby Tonight" | Whitney Houston |
| November 10 | "I'm Your Baby Tonight" | Whitney Houston |
| November 17 | "I'm Your Baby Tonight" | Whitney Houston |
| November 24 | "I'm Your Baby Tonight" | Whitney Houston |
| December 1 | "I'm Your Baby Tonight" | Whitney Houston |
| December 8 | "I've Been Thinking About You" | Londonbeat |
| December 15 | "I've Been Thinking About You" | Londonbeat |
| December 22 | "I've Been Thinking About You" | Londonbeat |
| December 29 | "Attenti al lupo" | Lucio Dalla |
