= List of number-one hits of 1965 (Italy) =

This is a list of the number-one hits of 1965 on Italian Hit Parade Singles Chart.

Issue date	Song	Artist
January 2	"Non son degno di te"	Gianni Morandi
January 9	"Non son degno di te"	Gianni Morandi
January 16	"Non son degno di te"	Gianni Morandi
January 23	"Non son degno di te"	Gianni Morandi
January 30	"Non son degno di te"	Gianni Morandi
February 6	"Non son degno di te"	Gianni Morandi
February 13	"Le colline sono in fiore"	New Christy Minstrels
February 20	"Le colline sono in fiore"	New Christy Minstrels
February 27	"Se piangi, se ridi"	Bobby Solo
March 6	"Le colline sono in fiore"	New Christy Minstrels
March 13	"Io che non vivo"	Pino Donaggio
March 20	"Io che non vivo"	Pino Donaggio
March 27	"Io che non vivo"	Pino Donaggio
April 3	"Un anno d'amore"	Mina
April 10	"Un anno d'amore"	Mina
April 17	"Un anno d'amore"	Mina
April 24	"Un anno d'amore"	Mina
May 1	"Un anno d'amore"	Mina
May 8	"Un anno d'amore"	Mina
May 15	"Un anno d'amore"	Mina
May 22	"Un anno d'amore"	Mina
May 29	"Un anno d'amore"	Mina
June 5	"Un anno d'amore"	Mina
June 12	"Un anno d'amore"	Mina
June 19	"Un anno d'amore"	Mina
June 26	"Un anno d'amore"	Mina
July 3	"Quello sbagliato"	Bobby Solo
July 10	"Ciao, ciao"	Petula Clark
July 17	"Il mondo"	Jimmy Fontana
July 24	"Il mondo"	Jimmy Fontana
July 31	"Il mondo"	Jimmy Fontana
August 7	"Se non avessi più te"	Gianni Morandi
August 14	"Il mondo"	Jimmy Fontana
August 21	"Il mondo"	Jimmy Fontana
August 28	"Il mondo"	Jimmy Fontana
September 4	"Il mondo"	Jimmy Fontana
September 11	"Il mondo"	Jimmy Fontana
September 18	"Il mondo"	Jimmy Fontana
September 25	"Il mondo"	Jimmy Fontana
October 2	"La danza di Zorba"	Mikis Theodorakis
October 9	"Si fa sera"	Gianni Morandi
October 16	"La danza di Zorba"	Mikis Theodorakis
October 23	"Si fa sera"	Gianni Morandi
October 30	"La danza di Zorba"	Mikis Theodorakis
November 6	"La danza di Zorba"	Mikis Theodorakis
November 13	"Help!"	The Beatles
November 20	"Si fa sera"	Gianni Morandi
November 27	"Si fa sera"	Gianni Morandi
December 4	"La festa"	Adriano Celentano
December 11	"La festa"	Adriano Celentano
December 18	"La festa"	Adriano Celentano
December 25	"Il silenzio"	Dalida

== See also ==
- 1965 in music
- List of number-one hits in Italy
