= Carlo Leva =

Italian film and costume designer (1930–2020)

- Born: 27 February 1930; Bergamasco, Italy
- Died: 4 April 2020 (aged 90); Alessandria, Italy
- Occupations: Production Designer; Costume Designer
- Years active: 1950–2010

Carlo Leva (27 February 1930 – 4 April 2020) was an Italian production designer.

== Biography ==
After beginning his career as second assistant art director in Genoa on the set of The Walls of Malapaga, Leva studied Architecture in Rome, specializing in production design, costume design and set decoration for movies and advertising.

In 1962, Leva was hired as assistant art director on Robert Aldrich's Sodom and Gomorrah, where he met second unit director Sergio Leone, who later hired him as assistant art director on A Fistful of Dollars, For a Few Dollars More and The Good, the Bad and the Ugly and as set decorator on Once Upon a Time in the West. He befriended also director Enzo Muzii, with whom he worked on movies such as Something Like Love, and later worked with many other directors, such as Federico Fellini, Dario Argento (for The Cat o' Nine Tails) and Carol Reed.

In 2017, Leva took part in the documentary film Sad Hill Unearthed, narrating the reconstruction of the cemetery scene of The Good, the Bad and the Ugly.

=== Death ===
Leva died in Alessandria on 4 April 2020, at the age of 90, due to a sudden illness.

== Partial filmography ==
=== Production designer ===
- Tears on Your Face (1964)
- Se non avessi più te (1965)
- Non son degno di te (1965)
- In a Colt's Shadow (1965)
- Mi vedrai tornare (1966)
- The Good, the Bad and the Ugly (1966)
- Something Like Love (1968)
- The Price of Power (1969)
- Angeli senza paradiso (1970)
- The Cat o' Nine Tails (1971)
- This Kind of Love (1972)
- Return of Halleluja (1972)
- Emergency Squad (1974)
- Cross Shot (1976)
- Mark Strikes Again (1976)
- Destruction Force (1977)
- The Witness (1978)

=== Art director ===
- Spirits of the Dead (1968)
- 32 dicembre (1988)

=== Costume designer ===
- The Cat o' Nine Tails (1971)

=== Set decorator ===
- Non son degno di te (1965)
- The Big Gundown (1967)
- Once Upon a Time in the West (1968)
- The Case of the Bloody Iris (1972)
- Return of Halleluja (1972)
