= Il nostro caro angelo =

Studio album by Lucio Battisti
- Released: September 1973
- Venue: Studi Fonorama (Milan); EMI Studios (London)
- Genre: Pop; Progressive rock
- Length: 40:27
- Label: Numero Uno
- Producer: Lucio Battisti, Mogol

Lucio Battisti chronology
Il mio canto libero (1972)	Il nostro caro angelo (1973)	Anima latina (1974)

Professional ratings
Review scores
Source	Rating
Ondarock	6/10 stars

Il nostro caro angelo
The title-track's lyrics are strongly critical of the Catholic Church

Le allettanti promesse
Le allettanti promesse, track #5

Questo inferno rosa
Questo inferno rosa, track #8

Il nostro caro angelo (Our Dear Angel) is the eighth studio album by the Italian singer and songwriter Lucio Battisti. It was released in September 1973 by Numero Uno and was Italy's second-best selling album in 1973, the first being Battisti's previous album, Il mio canto libero.

== Charts ==
=== Weekly charts ===
Chart (1973-4)	Highest position
Italy (Musica e dischi)	1

Chart (2007)	Peak position
Italy (FIMI)	66

== Track listing ==
All lyrics written by Mogol, all music composed by Lucio Battisti.

1. "La collina dei ciliegi" (Hill of Cherry Trees) – 4:58
2. "Ma è un canto brasileiro" (But it's a Brazilian Song) – 5:21
3. "La canzone della terra" (Song of the Dirt ) – 5:31
4. "Il nostro caro angelo" (Our Dear Angel) – 4:13
5. "Le allettanti promesse" (Tempting Promises) – 5:11
6. "Io gli ho detto no" (I told him 'No') – 4:21
7. "Prendi fra le mani la testa" (Take Your Head Between Your Hands) – 3:54
8. "Questo inferno rosa" (This Pink Hell) – 6:54

== Personnel ==
- Lucio Battisti – lead vocals, guitar, piano, Fender Rhodes, percussion
- Gian Piero Reverberi – piano, synthesizer
- Bob Callero – bass
- Massimo Luca – acoustic guitar
- Gianni Dall'Aglio – drums
- Mara Cubeddu, Wanda Radicchi – chorus
- Arrangements: Lucio Battisti, Gian Piero Reverberi
