= List of number-one hits of 1960 (Italy) =

This is a list of the number-one singles of 1960 in Italy on the weekly chart compiled by the Italian music magazine Musica e dischi. The oldest music industry publication in the country, Musica e dischi had published the chart since 1960, ranking the best-selling singles nationally. The chart was also regularly featured on the Hits of the World section of Billboard magazine.

== Chart history ==
Week	Single	Artist(s)	Ref.
1	"De Guello"	Nelson Riddle	
2	"Forever"	Joe Damiano	
3	"Forever"	Joe Damiano	
4	"Oh Carol"	Neil Sedaka	
5	"Romantica"	Tony Dallara	
6	"Romantica"	Tony Dallara	
7	"Romantica"	Tony Dallara	
8	"Romantica"	Tony Dallara	
9	"Romantica"	Tony Dallara	
10	"Romantica"	Tony Dallara	
11	"Romantica"	Tony Dallara	
12	"Romantica"	Tony Dallara	
13	"Marina"	Rocco Granata	
14	"Marina"	Rocco Granata	
15	"Marina"	Rocco Granata	
16	"Marina"	Rocco Granata	
17	"Marina"	Rocco Granata	
18	"Scandalo al sole"	Percy Faith	
19	"Scandalo al sole"	Percy Faith	
20	"Scandalo al sole"	Percy Faith	
21	"Scandalo al sole"	Percy Faith	
22	"Scandalo al sole"	Percy Faith	
23	"Scandalo al sole"	Percy Faith	
24	"Puppy love"	Paul Anka	
25	"Puppy love"	Paul Anka	
26	"Puppy love"	Paul Anka	
27	"Serenata a Margellina"	Sergio Bruni	
28	"Serenata a Margellina"	Sergio Bruni	
29	"Serenata a Margellina"	Sergio Bruni	
30	"Scandalo al sole"	Percy Faith	
31	"Scandalo al sole"	Percy Faith	
32	"Impazzivo per te"	Adriano Celentano	
33	"Il nostro concerto"	Umberto Bindi	
34	"Il nostro concerto"	Umberto Bindi	
35	"Il nostro concerto"	Umberto Bindi	
36	"Il nostro concerto"	Umberto Bindi	
37	"Il nostro concerto"	Umberto Bindi	
38	"Il nostro concerto"	Umberto Bindi	
39	"Il nostro concerto"	Umberto Bindi	
40	"Il nostro concerto"	Umberto Bindi	
41	"Il nostro concerto"	Umberto Bindi	
42	"Il nostro concerto"	Umberto Bindi	
43	"Il cielo in una stanza"	Mina	
44	"Il cielo in una stanza"	Mina	
45	"Il cielo in una stanza"	Mina	
46	"Il cielo in una stanza"	Mina	
47	"Il cielo in una stanza"	Mina	
48	"Il cielo in una stanza"	Mina	
49	"Il cielo in una stanza"	Mina	
50	"Il cielo in una stanza"	Mina	
51	"Il cielo in una stanza"	Mina	
52	"Il cielo in una stanza"	Mina	

== See also ==
- 1960 in music
- List of number-one hits in Italy
