= List of number-one hits of 1969 (Italy) =

This is a list of the number-one hits of 1969 on Italian Hit Parade Singles Chart.

Issue date	Song	Artist
January 4	"Zum zum zum"	Sylvie Vartan
January 11	"Zum zum zum"	Sylvie Vartan
January 18	"Scende la pioggia"	Gianni Morandi
January 25	"Scende la pioggia"	Gianni Morandi
February 1	"Scende la pioggia"	Gianni Morandi
February 8	"Scende la pioggia"	Gianni Morandi
February 15	"Scende la pioggia"	Gianni Morandi
February 22	"Zingara"	Bobby Solo
March 1	"Zingara"	Bobby Solo
March 8	"Ma che freddo fa"	Nada
March 15	"Ma che freddo fa"	Nada
March 22	"Ma che freddo fa"	Nada
March 29	"Ma che freddo fa"	Nada
April 5	"Ma che freddo fa"	Nada
April 12	"Eloise"	Barry Ryan
April 19	"Eloise"	Barry Ryan
April 26	"Eloise"	Barry Ryan
May 3	"Eloise"	Barry Ryan
May 10	"Eloise"	Barry Ryan
May 17	"Tutta mia la città"	Equipe 84
May 24	"Tutta mia la città"	Equipe 84
May 31	"Tutta mia la città"	Equipe 84
June 7	"Tutta mia la città"	Equipe 84
June 14	"Storia d'amore"	Adriano Celentano
June 21	"Storia d'amore"	Adriano Celentano
June 28	"Storia d'amore"	Adriano Celentano
July 5	"Pensando a te"	Al Bano
July 12	"Lisa dagli occhi blu"	Mario Tessuto
July 19	"Lisa dagli occhi blu"	Mario Tessuto
July 26	"Lisa dagli occhi blu"	Mario Tessuto
August 2	"Lisa dagli occhi blu"	Mario Tessuto
August 9	"Lisa dagli occhi blu"	Mario Tessuto
August 16	"Lisa dagli occhi blu"	Mario Tessuto
August 23	"Lisa dagli occhi blu"	Mario Tessuto
August 30	"Lisa dagli occhi blu"	Mario Tessuto
September 6	"Pensiero d'amore"	Mal
September 13	"Pensiero d'amore"	Mal
September 20	"Pensiero d'amore"	Mal
September 27	"Pensiero d'amore"	Mal
October 4	"Il primo giorno di primavera"	Dik Dik
October 11	"Il primo giorno di primavera"	Dik Dik
October 18	"Lo straniero"	Georges Moustaki
October 25	"Lo straniero"	Georges Moustaki
November 1	"Lo straniero"	Georges Moustaki
November 8	"Lo straniero"	Georges Moustaki
November 15	"Lo straniero"	Georges Moustaki
November 22	"Lo straniero"	Georges Moustaki
November 29	"Lo straniero"	Georges Moustaki
December 6	"Lo straniero"	Georges Moustaki
December 13	"Lo straniero"	Georges Moustaki
December 20	"Belinda"	Gianni Morandi
December 27	"Belinda"	Gianni Morandi

== See also ==
- 1969 in music
- List of number-one hits in Italy
