= Le Métèque =

"Le métèque"

Single by Georges Moustaki

from the album Georges Moustaki
- B-side: "Voyage"
- Released: 1969
- Recorded: 1969
- Genre: Chanson
- Length: 2:30
- Label: Polydor - 59 304
- Songwriter: Georges Moustaki
- Producers: Jacques Bedos, Henri Belolo

"Le métèque" is a French chanson by Georges Moustaki (1934–2013). He wrote it in 1969, and it was his first breakthrough hit, reaching number one in the French charts for six non-consecutive weeks. Before this song he had written for many singers, including "Milord" for Édith Piaf. He recorded an Italian version titled "Lo straniero", which became the best-selling record of 1969 in Italy.

Métèque is a pejorative word for a shifty-looking immigrant of Mediterranean origin.

== Other versions ==
- The song has been translated into several languages.
- 1968 - Pia Colombo album A L'Olympia (Disc'Az – LPS 25)
- 1969 - Caravelli album Caravelli (CBS Records International – S 7–63687)
- 1969 - Manu Dibango album Manu Dibango (Mercury Records – 135.717 MCY)
- 1969 - Georges Jouvin album Trompette d'or (La Voix de son maître - 2C 062–10278)
- 1969 - Dominique Bellot featuring Orchestre Bernard Wystraëte album Hits Variety N° 1 (AFA – 20 728)
- 1970 - Bobby Solo, lyrics by Bruno Lauzi, album Bobby Folk (Dischi Ricordi – 23 23 004), published in Spain
- 1970 - The Musicos album Discothèque N° 2 (Concert Hall Society – SMS-15017)
- 1970 - Tanju Okan, lyrics by Nino Varon, with the title Hasret (Yonca Plakçılık Ve Reklamcılık – YCA-010)
- 1971 - Herman Van Keeken album Herman Van Keeken (Nap – 2935 001), published in The Netherlands
- Greek singer George Dalaras recorded a Greek version "O Metoikos" with new lyrics by Dimitris Christodoulou in 1971.
- 1972 - Melina Mercouri with the title O metikos, lyrics by D. Christodoulou, album Melina Mercouri (Polydor – 23 93 027), published in Spain, Germany, Canada and United Kingdom
- 1972 - Yossi Banai with the title פרצוף של צועני (face of a gypsy), lyrics by Nisim Aloni, Album 'face of a gypsy', published inisrael
- 1978 - De Strangers with the title De gastarbeider, lyrics by Lex Colman; album Goe zot (Decca Records - DEC 193.500 K), published in Belgium
- 1982 - Dennie Christian with the title Voor zoiets is het nooit te laat, lyrics by David Hartsema, album Vriendschap (Polydor – 2925–134), published in The Netherlands
- 1986 - Stranger Alex with the title De gastarbeider, lyrics by Lex Colman; album Helemaal Alleen Op Z'n Eentje (Dureco Benelux – 66063), published in Belgium
- 1986 - Utako Watanabe album Devo tornare a casa mia (Omagatoki – SC 5005), published in Japan
- 1988 - Manolo album Manolo (Discadanse – D 76), published in France
- 1991 - Luc et Patrick, album Les troubadours des temps modernes (Luc – 1691), published in Switzerland
- Moustaki recorded an Italian version with lyrics translated by Bruno Lauzi. His rendition of this version was released in 1969 as a single titled "Lo straniero" (B-side "Giuseppe"), with arrangement by Alain Goraguer. It reached number one on the Italian charts, and became the best-selling record of the year in Italy. In 1970, Moustaki's recording won the Mostra internazionale di musica leggera (Gondola d'oro) in Venice as the best-selling record of 1969.

== Charts ==
Chart (1969–1970)	Peak position
Argentina (CAPIF)	4
Belgium (Ultratop 50 Wallonia)	2
France (Hit Parade)	1
Italy (Musica e dischi)	1
Spain (PROMUSICAE)	29
Switzerland (Schweizer Hitparade)	73
