= Il mio canto libero =

1972 album by Lucio Battisti

Studio album by Lucio Battisti
- Released: November 1972
- Genre: Pop/rock
- Length: 37:54
- Label: Numero Uno
- Producer: Lucio Battisti

Lucio Battisti chronology
Umanamente uomo: il sogno (1972)	Il mio canto libero (1972)	Il nostro caro angelo (1973)

Professional ratings
Review scores
Source	Rating
Ondarock	– recommended

La luce dell'est
La luce dell'est, track #1

Confusione
Confusione, track #5

Il mio canto libero
The title-track

Il mio canto libero (My Free Singing) is the seventh studio album by the Italian singer-songwriter Lucio Battisti. It was released in November 1972 by Numero Uno.

The album was Italy's best-selling album in 1973.

== Charts ==
=== Weekly charts ===
Chart (1973–4)	Highest position
Italy (Musica e dischi)	1

Chart (2000–23)	Peak position
Italy (FIMI)	25

== Track listing ==
All lyrics written by Mogol, all music composed by Lucio Battisti.

1. "La luce dell'est" (The Light from the East) – 6:18
2. "Luci-ah" – 4:47
3. "L'aquila" (The Eagle) – 4:24
4. "Vento nel vento" (Wind in the Wind) – 3:24
5. "Confusione" (Confusion) – 4:30
6. "Io vorrei… non vorrei… ma se vuoi…" (I'd Like… I Wouldn't Like… But If You Want…) – 4:35
7. "Gente per bene e gente per male" (Good People and Bad People) – 4:46
8. "Il mio canto libero" (A Song to Feel Alive) – 5:08
