= Nata per me =

Italian song

Song by Adriano Celentano
- Language: Italian
- Released: 1961
- Genre: Slow rock
- Length: 2:40
- Songwriters: Mogol; Michele Del Prete; Adriano Celentano

Audio
- "Nata per me" on YouTube

"Nata per me" ('Born for me') is a song by Italian singer Adriano Celentano. Released in 1961, it was the number one hit on the Italian Hit Parade Singles Chart for a total of 12 weeks between November 1961 and 1962.

== Overview ==
"Nata per me" marked the first collaboration between Celentano and Mogol. It was also the first Celentano's song to feature forgiveness following a betrayal, a motif that would become a recurring theme in his repertoire. With this song Celentano took part in the finals of Canzonissima. It was included in Celentano's 1963 album A New Orleans.

== Charts ==
Chart performance for "Nata per me"
| Chart (1961–62) | Peak position |
|---|---|
| Argentina (CAPIF) | 2 |
| Italy (Musica e dischi) | 1 |

== See also ==
- List of number-one hits of 1961 (Italy)
- List of number-one hits of 1962 (Italy)
