= List of number-one hits of 1989 (Italy) =

This is a list of the number-one hits of 1989 on Italian Hit Parade Singles Chart.

Issue Date	Song	Artist(s)
January 7	"C'è da spostare una macchina"	Francesco Salvi
January 14	"C'è da spostare una macchina"	Francesco Salvi
January 22	"C'è da spostare una macchina"	Francesco Salvi
January 28	"C'è da spostare una macchina"	Francesco Salvi
February 4	"C'è da spostare una macchina"	Francesco Salvi
February 11	"051/222525"	Fabio Concato
February 18	"051/222525"	Fabio Concato
February 25	"051/222525"	Fabio Concato
March 4	"Esatto!"	Francesco Salvi
March 11	"Esatto!"	Francesco Salvi
March 18	"Esatto!"	Francesco Salvi
March 25	"Esatto!"	Francesco Salvi
April 1	"Esatto!"	Francesco Salvi
April 8	"Esatto!"	Francesco Salvi
April 15	"Like a Prayer"	Madonna
April 22	"Like a Prayer"	Madonna
April 29	"Like a Prayer"	Madonna
May 6	"Like a Prayer"	Madonna
May 13	"Like a Prayer"	Madonna
May 20	"Like a Prayer"	Madonna
May 27	"Like a Prayer"	Madonna
June 3	"Like a Prayer"	Madonna
June 10	"Like a Prayer"	Madonna
June 17	"When the Night Comes"	Joe Cocker
June 24	"Express Yourself"	Madonna
July 1	"When the Night Comes"	Joe Cocker
July 8	"Express Yourself"	Madonna
July 15	"Viva la mamma"	Edoardo Bennato
July 22	"Viva la mamma"	Edoardo Bennato
July 29	"Viva la mamma"	Edoardo Bennato
August 5	"Viva la mamma"	Edoardo Bennato
August 12	"Viva la mamma"	Edoardo Bennato
August 19	"Viva la mamma"	Edoardo Bennato
August 26	"Viva la mamma"	Edoardo Bennato
September 2	"Viva la mamma"	Edoardo Bennato
September 9	"Viva la mamma"	Edoardo Bennato
September 16	"Viva la mamma"	Edoardo Bennato
September 23	"Viva la mamma"	Edoardo Bennato
September 30	"Lambada"	Kaoma
October 7	"Lambada"	Kaoma
October 14	"Lambada"	Kaoma
October 21	"Lambada"	Kaoma
October 28	"Lambada"	Kaoma
November 4	"Lambada"	Kaoma
November 11	"Lambada"	Kaoma
November 18	"Lambada"	Kaoma
November 25	"Lambada"	Kaoma
December 2	"Lambada"	Kaoma
December 9	"Lambada"	Kaoma
December 16	"Lambada"	Kaoma
December 23	"Lambada"	Kaoma
December 30	"Lambada"	Kaoma
