= List of number-one hits of 1973 (Italy) =

This is a list of the number-one hits of 1973 on Italian Hit Parade Singles Chart.

Issue date	Song	Artist
January 6	"Questo piccolo grande amore"	Claudio Baglioni
January 13	"Questo piccolo grande amore"	Claudio Baglioni
January 20	"Questo piccolo grande amore"	Claudio Baglioni
January 27	"Il mio canto libero"	Lucio Battisti
February 3	"Erba di casa mia"	Massimo Ranieri
February 10	"Il mio canto libero"	Lucio Battisti
February 17	"Il mio canto libero"	Lucio Battisti
February 24	"Il mio canto libero"	Lucio Battisti
March 3	"Il mio canto libero"	Lucio Battisti
March 10	"Il mio canto libero"	Lucio Battisti
March 17	"Il mio canto libero"	Lucio Battisti
March 24	"Il mio canto libero"	Lucio Battisti
March 31	"Il mio canto libero"	Lucio Battisti
April 7	"Il mio canto libero"	Lucio Battisti
April 14	"Vincent"	Don McLean
April 21	"Vincent"	Don McLean
April 28	"Vincent"	Don McLean
May 5	"Vincent"	Don McLean
May 12	"Vincent"	Don McLean
May 19	"Vincent"	Don McLean
May 26	"Vincent"	Don McLean
June 2	"Crocodile Rock"	Elton John
June 9	"Crocodile Rock"	Elton John
June 16	"Crocodile Rock"	Elton John
June 23	"Crocodile Rock"	Elton John
June 30	"Crocodile Rock"	Elton John
July 7	"Perché ti amo"	I Camaleonti
July 14	"Perché ti amo"	I Camaleonti
July 21	"Perché ti amo"	I Camaleonti
July 28	"Perché ti amo"	I Camaleonti
August 4	"Perché ti amo"	I Camaleonti
August 11	"Perché ti amo"	I Camaleonti
August 18	"Perché ti amo"	I Camaleonti
August 25	"Pazza idea"	Patty Pravo
September 1	"Pazza idea"	Patty Pravo
September 8	"Pazza idea"	Patty Pravo
September 15	"Pazza idea"	Patty Pravo
September 22	"Pazza idea"	Patty Pravo
September 29	"Pazza idea"	Patty Pravo
October 6	"Pazza idea"	Patty Pravo
October 13	"Pazza idea"	Patty Pravo
October 20	"Pazza idea"	Patty Pravo
October 27	"Io e te per altri giorni"	Pooh
November 3	"Io e te per altri giorni"	Pooh
November 10	"La collina dei ciliegi"	Lucio Battisti
November 17	"La collina dei ciliegi"	Lucio Battisti
November 24	"La collina dei ciliegi"	Lucio Battisti
December 1	"La collina dei ciliegi"	Lucio Battisti
December 8	"La collina dei ciliegi"	Lucio Battisti
December 15	"La collina dei ciliegi"	Lucio Battisti
December 22	"La collina dei ciliegi"	Lucio Battisti
December 29	"La collina dei ciliegi"	Lucio Battisti

== Number-one artists ==
Position	Artist	Weeks #1
1	Lucio Battisti	18
2	Patty Pravo	9
3	Don McLean	7
3	I Camaleonti	7
4	Elton John	5
5	Claudio Baglioni	3
6	Pooh	2
7	Massimo Ranieri	1

== See also ==
- 1973 in music
