= List of number-one hits of 1967 (Italy) =

This is a list of the number-one hits of 1967 on Italian Hit Parade Singles Chart.

Issue date	Song	Artist
January 7	"Bang Bang"	Dalida
January 14	"Bang Bang"	Dalida
January 21	"C'era un ragazzo che come me..."	Gianni Morandi
January 28	"C'era un ragazzo che come me..."	Gianni Morandi
February 4	"Se perdo anche te"	Gianni Morandi
February 11	"Se perdo anche te"	Gianni Morandi
February 18	"Cuore matto"	Little Tony
February 25	"Cuore matto"	Little Tony
March 4	"Cuore matto"	Little Tony
March 11	"Cuore matto"	Little Tony
March 18	"Cuore matto"	Little Tony
March 25	"Cuore matto"	Little Tony
April 1	"Cuore matto"	Little Tony
April 8	"Cuore matto"	Little Tony
April 15	"Cuore matto"	Little Tony
April 22	"Un mondo d'amore"	Gianni Morandi
April 29	"Un mondo d'amore"	Gianni Morandi
May 6	"Un mondo d'amore"	Gianni Morandi
May 13	"Un mondo d'amore"	Gianni Morandi
May 20	"29 settembre"	Equipe 84
May 27	"29 settembre"	Equipe 84
June 3	"29 settembre"	Equipe 84
June 10	"A chi"	Fausto Leali
June 17	"A chi"	Fausto Leali
June 24	"A chi"	Fausto Leali
July 1	"A chi"	Fausto Leali
July 8	"La mia serenata"	Jimmy Fontana
July 15	"La coppia più bella del mondo"	Adriano Celentano
July 22	"La coppia più bella del mondo"	Adriano Celentano
July 29	"La coppia più bella del mondo"	Adriano Celentano
August 5	"La coppia più bella del mondo"	Adriano Celentano
August 12	"La coppia più bella del mondo"	Adriano Celentano
August 19	"La coppia più bella del mondo"	Adriano Celentano
August 26	"Nel sole"	Al Bano
September 2	"Nel sole"	Al Bano
September 9	"Nel sole"	Al Bano
September 16	"Nel sole"	Al Bano
September 23	"A Whiter Shade of Pale"	Procol Harum
September 30	"A Whiter Shade of Pale"	Procol Harum
October 7	"A Whiter Shade of Pale"	Procol Harum
October 14	"A Whiter Shade of Pale"	Procol Harum
October 21	"A Whiter Shade of Pale"	Procol Harum
October 28	"A Whiter Shade of Pale"	Procol Harum
November 4	"A Whiter Shade of Pale"	Procol Harum
November 11	"Parole"	Nico e i Gabbiani
November 18	"Senza luce"	Dik Dik
November 25	"Parole"	Nico e i Gabbiani
December 2	"Parole"	Nico e i Gabbiani
December 9	"Mama"	Dalida
December 16	"L'ora dell'amore"	I Camaleonti
December 23	"L'ora dell'amore"	I Camaleonti
December 30	"L'ora dell'amore"	I Camaleonti

== See also ==
- 1967 in music
- List of number-one hits in Italy
