= List of number-one hits of 1963 (Italy) =

This is a list of the number-one hits of 1963 on Italian Hit Parade Singles Chart.

Indicates best-performing single of 1963

Issue date	Song	Artist
January 5	"Speedy Gonzales"	Pat Boone
January 12	"Speedy Gonzales"	Peppino di Capri
January 19	"Speedy Gonzales"	Peppino di Capri
January 26	"Speedy Gonzales"	Pat Boone
February 2	"La partita di pallone"	Rita Pavone
February 9	"La partita di pallone"	Rita Pavone
February 16	"La partita di pallone"	Rita Pavone
February 23	"La partita di pallone"	Rita Pavone
March 2	"Giovane, Giovane"	Pino Donaggio
March 9	"Giovane, Giovane"	Pino Donaggio
March 16	"Come te non c'è nessuno"	Rita Pavone
March 23	"Come te non c'è nessuno"	Rita Pavone
March 30	"Come te non c'è nessuno"	Rita Pavone
April 6	"La terza luna"	Neil Sedaka
April 13	"Come te non c'è nessuno"	Rita Pavone
April 20	"Come te non c'è nessuno"	Rita Pavone
April 27	"Come te non c'è nessuno"	Rita Pavone
May 4	"Come te non c'è nessuno"	Rita Pavone
May 11	"Come te non c'è nessuno"	Rita Pavone
May 18	"Come te non c'è nessuno"	Rita Pavone
May 25	"Come te non c'è nessuno"	Rita Pavone
June 1	"Il tangaccio"	Adriano Celentano
June 8	"Il Ballo del Mattone"	Rita Pavone
June 15	"Il Ballo del Mattone"	Rita Pavone
June 22	"Cuore"	Rita Pavone
June 29	"Cuore"	Rita Pavone
July 6	"Cuore"	Rita Pavone
July 13	"Quelli della mia età"	Françoise Hardy
July 20	"Cuore"	Rita Pavone
July 27	"Cuore"	Rita Pavone
August 3	"Quelli della mia età"	Françoise Hardy
August 10	"Cuore"	Rita Pavone
August 17	"Cuore"	Rita Pavone
August 24	"Cuore"	Rita Pavone
August 31	"Cuore"	Rita Pavone
September 7	"Cuore"	Rita Pavone
September 14	"Cuore"	Rita Pavone
September 21	"Se mi vuoi lasciare"	Michele
September 28	"Quelli della mia età"	Françoise Hardy
October 5	"Se mi vuoi lasciare"	Michele
October 12	"Se mi vuoi lasciare"	Michele
October 19	"Se mi vuoi lasciare"	Michele
October 26	"Se mi vuoi lasciare"	Michele
November 2	"Se mi vuoi lasciare"	Michele
November 9	"Se mi vuoi lasciare"	Michele
November 16	"Se mi vuoi lasciare"	Michele
November 23	"Se mi vuoi lasciare"	Michele
November 30	"Sabato triste"	Adriano Celentano
December 7	"Sabato triste"	Adriano Celentano
December 14	"Sabato triste"	Adriano Celentano
December 21	"L'età dell'amore"	Françoise Hardy
December 28	"Sabato triste"	Adriano Celentano

== See also ==
- 1963 in music
- List of number-one hits in Italy
