= In ginocchio da te =

Single by Gianni Morandi

from the album Ritratto di Gianni
- B-side: "Se puoi uscire una domenica sola con me"
- Released: 1964
- Genre: Pop
- Length: 3:15
- Label: RCA Italiana
- Songwriters: Franco Migliacci, Bruno Zambrini
- Producer: Franco Migliacci

Gianni Morandi singles chronology
"Il ragazzo del muro della morte" (1963)	"In ginocchio da te" (1964)	"Non son degno di te" (1964)

Audio
- "In ginocchio da te" on YouTube

"In ginocchio da te" (transl. On my knees to you) is a 1964 Italian song composed by Franco Migliacci (lyrics) and Bruno Zambrini (music), arranged by Ennio Morricone and performed by Gianni Morandi. It was considered the number-one song of 1964 in Italy.

== Background ==
Morandi initially didn't want to record the song, considering it too much different from his previous repertoire, which consisted of lighter and more rhythmic songs. The song eventually won the Cantagiro festival and was a massive success, staying on the top of the Italian hit parade for a total of 17 weeks and being awarded gold disc as it was certified as having sold over one million copies. It also marked a turning point in Morandi's career, who since then embraced a more adult and romantic repertoire.

In 1964 Gianni published the Castilian version, text by Martinez, entitled Hoy de rodillas released in Spain (RCA Victor, 3-20857), inserted in the album El romantico de la juventud - Vol. II of 1966, released in Venezuela (RCA Victor, 7-393).

The song was covered by numerous artists, including Neil Sedaka (with the title "In the Chapel with You"), Dalida, Rita Pavone, Enrique Guzmán, Tereza Kesovija, Akira Fuse, Fausto Papetti, Jimmy Fontana, Tito Mora, José Guardiola, Al Bano, Nico Fidenco. It also named a musicarello film with the same title, directed by Ettore Maria Fizzarotti and starring the same Morandi and his future wife Laura Efrikian.

The song was included in the soundtrack of several films, notably Blood Ties by Guillaume Canet and Parasite by Bong Joon-ho.

== Track listing ==
- 7" single – PM 45 3263
1. "In ginocchio da te" (Franco Migliacci, Bruno Zambrini)
2. "Se puoi uscire una domenica sola con me" (Giancarlo Guardabassi, Bruno Zambrini)

== Charts ==
=== Weekly charts ===
Chart (1964–65)	Peak position
Argentina (CAPIF)	18
Brazil (IBOPE)	6
Italy (Musica e dischi)	1

=== Year-end charts ===
Chart (1964)	Peak position
Italy (Musica e dischi)	1
