= The Italian Tenors =

Italian crossover vocal group

- Origin: Italy
- Genres: Pop, crossover
- Years active: 2011–present
- Members: Sabino Gaita; Mirko Provini; Evans Tonon
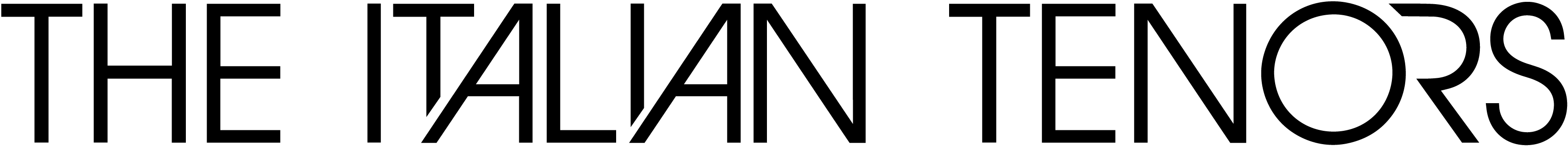
- Website: universal-music.de/the-italian-tenors

The Italian Tenors consists of three Italian opera singers Mirko Provini, Sabino Gaita and Evans Tonon. The group is produced by former Warner and Polydor manager Götz Kiso in Germany. The Italian Tenors released their first album That's Amore (Label: Koch Universal Music) in May 2012. It was produced in November 2011 in Turin, Italy, by René Möckel. The album covers a variety of songs from celebrated Italian pop artists and composers, rearranged, and reinterpreted in Italian and English.

The group joined Chinese soprano and Grammy Award winner Jia Ruhan and recorded with her two duets to be included in her crossover album Smile, released in 2013.

The Italian Tenors are managed by Maxi Media, a German music and TV production company based in Cologne, Germany.

== Members ==
- Sabino Gaita was born on April 24, 1977, in Milan, Italy, where he studied music at the local conservatory. He is a tenor and a composer. He plays saxophone, clarinet and piano. Today he lives in Turin, Italy.
- Mirko Provini was born on March 27, 1985, in Cremenaga, Italy. He studied music at Milan's conservatory besides holding a degree in sociology.
- Evans Tonon was born on October 9, 1970, in Turin, Italy. He is a baritone and studied music in London and Rome. He has performed in several Italian opera houses.

== Discography ==
- That's Amore (2012)
1. Piccola e fragile
2. Senza una donna
3. Adesso tu
4. That's Amore
5. Miserere
6. Bello e impossibile
7. Here's to You
8. Se bastasse una canzone
9. Parla più piano (Love Theme from The Godfather)
10. Ti sento
11. Io non ti lascio più
12. Ti amo
13. Arrivederci Roma

The album reached #44 on the Austria album top 75 chart.

- Viva La Vita (2014)
1. Gloria
2. Tornerò
3. C'era una volta la terra mia
4. Un' estate italiana
5. Mamma Maria
6. Felicità
7. Gente di mare
8. Somewhere
9. Hallelujah
10. Con te partirò
11. Io che non vivo senza te
12. Caruso
