= Moll Anderson =

American interior designer

Moll Anderson (née Molly R. Ruffalo) is an American interior designer, life stylist, author, former singer and national iHeart Radio host on The Moll Anderson Show. She is the author of Change Your Home, Change Your Life with Color, Seductive Tables For Two, The Seductive Home Limited Edition, The Seductive Home, and Change Your Home, Change Your Life. She has been a regular contributor on The Doctors and a guest co-host on FabLife and she has been a featured guest on CBS’ The Talk, Access Hollywood Live, Good Day LA, ABC's Good Morning America, NBC's The Today Show, the nationally syndicated Dr. Phil Show, and The Doctors. Anderson has written a monthly column for Nashville Lifestyles and was writing a column for SuCasa Magazine in Summer 2016. She has been featured in InStyle Magazine, Cosmopolitan Magazine, and other national publications. Anderson also served as both host and designer for shows such as E! Style Network's Look for Less: Home Edition, HGTV’s Hot Trends in Outdoor Entertaining, and Turner South’s Southern Home by Design. Anderson was a featured blogger on Magazines.com.

== Books ==
- Change your Home, Change Your Life (2006)
- The Seductive Home (2011)
- Change Your Home, Change Your Life with Color, What’s Your Color Story? (2017)

== Singer: Giorgio Moroder Project ==
She was a singer of Giorgio Moroder Project and performed To Be Number One at 1990 FIFA World Cup opening ceremony.

== Awards ==
- 1993: Emmy for entertainment reporting
- 2011: Donna Karen's Women Who Inspire
- 2013, 2014: Gracie Award Winner, Outstanding Host Lifestyle Program for The Moll Anderson Show
- 2015: Gracie Award Winner, Outstanding On-Air Talent: Lifestyle/Health Program as a contributor on The Doctors-Stage 29 Productions
- 2016: UNICEF Spirit of Compassion Award
