= List of number-one hits of 1962 (Italy) =

This is a list of the No. 1 hits of 1962 on Italian Hit Parade Singles Chart.

Indicates best-performing single of 1962

Issue date	Song	Artist
January 6	"Nata per me"	Adriano Celentano
January 13	"Nata per me"	Adriano Celentano
January 20	"Nata per me"	Adriano Celentano
January 27	"Nata per me"	Adriano Celentano
February 3	"Nata per me"	Adriano Celentano
February 10	"Nata per me"	Adriano Celentano
February 17	"Wheels"	Marcel Amont
February 24	"Let's Twist Again"	Peppino di Capri
March 3	"Quando, quando, quando"	Tony Renis
March 10	"Wheels"	Billy Vaughn
March 17	"Quando, quando, quando"	Tony Renis
March 24	"Quando, quando, quando"	Tony Renis
March 31	"Quando, quando, quando"	Tony Renis
April 7	"Quando, quando, quando"	Tony Renis
April 14	"Quando, quando, quando"	Tony Renis
April 21	"Quando, quando, quando"	Tony Renis
April 28	"Quando, quando, quando"	Tony Renis
May 5	"Quando, quando, quando"	Tony Renis
May 12	"Quando, quando, quando"	Tony Renis
May 19	"Let's Twist Again"	Chubby Checker
May 26	"No More"	Elvis Presley
June 2	"No More"	Elvis Presley
June 9	"Let's Twist Again"	Peppino Di Capri
June 16	"Stai lontana da me"	Adriano Celentano
June 23	"Stai lontana da me"	Adriano Celentano
June 30	"Stai lontana da me"	Adriano Celentano
July 7	"Stai lontana da me"	Adriano Celentano
July 14	"Stai lontana da me"	Adriano Celentano
July 21	"Stai lontana da me"	Adriano Celentano
July 28	"Stai lontana da me"	Adriano Celentano
August 4	"Stai lontana da me"	Adriano Celentano
August 11	"Stai lontana da me"	Adriano Celentano
August 18	"Stai lontana da me"	Adriano Celentano
August 25	"Stai lontana da me"	Adriano Celentano
September 1	"Stai lontana da me"	Adriano Celentano
September 8	"Cuando calienta el sol"	Los Hermanos Rigual
September 15	"Cuando calienta el sol"	Los Hermanos Rigual
September 22	"Cuando calienta el sol"	Los Hermanos Rigual
September 29	"Cuando calienta el sol"	Los Hermanos Rigual
October 6	"Ogni giorno"	Paul Anka
October 13	"Ogni giorno"	Paul Anka
October 20	"Speedy Gonzales"	Pat Boone
October 27	"Speedy Gonzales"	Pat Boone
November 3	"Pregherò"	Adriano Celentano
November 10	"Pregherò"	Adriano Celentano
November 17	"Speedy Gonzales"	Pat Boone
November 24	"Speedy Gonzales"	Pat Boone
December 1	"Pregherò"	Adriano Celentano
December 8	"Si è spento il sole"	Adriano Celentano
December 15	"Pregherò"	Adriano Celentano
December 22	"Pregherò"	Adriano Celentano
December 29	"Speedy Gonzales"	Pat Boone

== See also ==
- 1962 in music
- List of number-one hits in Italy
