= Piccola e fragile =

Single by Drupi

from the album Drupi
- B-side: "...Che estate"
- Released: April 1974
- Genre: Rhythm and blues; pop
- Label: Dischi Ricordi
- Composer: Enrico Riccardi
- Lyricist: Luigi Albertelli

Drupi singles chronology
"Rimani" (1974)	"Piccola e fragile" (1974)	"Sereno è" (1974)

Audio
- "Piccola e fragile" on YouTube

"Piccola e fragile" (Italian pronunciation: [ˈpikkola e fˈfraːdʒile]; transl. "Tiny and Fragile") is a 1974 song written by Enrico Riccardi (music) and Luigi Albertelli (lyrics), and performed by Drupi.

== Background ==
Drupi's major hit, the single topped the Italian hit parade in the 1974 summer, and its success revamped in 1989, when a new version of the song was used as opening theme of the telenovela Topacio.

== Cover versions ==
The song was covered by several artists, including Albano Carrisi, The Italian Tenors, Piergiorgio Farina, Norman Candler and, in a Spanish-language version titled "Pequeña y frágil", Sabú. Flamingokvintetten's cover version, titled "Är du lycklig nu", topped the Swedish hit parade.

== Track listing ==
- 7" single
1. "Piccola e fragile" (Enrico Riccardi, Luigi Albertelli) - 4:33
2. "...Che estate" (Drupi, Kativ) - 3:54

== Charts ==
Chart (1974–75)	Peak position
Austria (Ö3 Austria Top 40)	9
Germany (Official German Charts)	24
Italy (Musica e dischi)	1
Switzerland (Schweizer Hitparade)	3
