= List of number-one hits of 1991 (Italy) =

This is a list of the number-one hits of 1991 on Italian Hit Parade Singles Chart.

Issue Date	Song	Artist(s)
January 5	"I've Been Thinking About You"	Londonbeat
January 12	"Attenti al lupo"	Lucio Dalla
January 19	"Attenti al lupo"	Lucio Dalla
January 26	"Attenti al lupo"	Lucio Dalla
February 2	"Sadeness (Part I)"	Enigma
February 9	"Sadeness (Part I)"	Enigma
February 16	"Sadeness (Part I)"	Enigma
February 23	"Sadeness (Part I)"	Enigma
March 2	"Sadeness (Part I)"	Enigma
March 9	"Se stiamo insieme"	Riccardo Cocciante
March 16	"Se stiamo insieme"	Riccardo Cocciante
March 23	"Se stiamo insieme"	Riccardo Cocciante
March 30	"Se stiamo insieme"	Riccardo Cocciante
April 6	"Se stiamo insieme"	Riccardo Cocciante
April 13	"Se stiamo insieme"	Riccardo Cocciante
April 20	"Se stiamo insieme"	Riccardo Cocciante
April 27	"Se stiamo insieme"	Riccardo Cocciante
May 4	"Se stiamo insieme"	Riccardo Cocciante
May 11	"Se stiamo insieme"	Riccardo Cocciante
May 18	"Se stiamo insieme"	Riccardo Cocciante
May 25	"Se stiamo insieme"	Riccardo Cocciante
June 1	"Se stiamo insieme"	Riccardo Cocciante
June 8	"Se stiamo insieme"	Riccardo Cocciante
June 15	"Let There Be Love"	Simple Minds
June 22	"Gypsy Woman (She's Homeless)"	Crystal Waters
June 29	"Gypsy Woman (She's Homeless)"	Crystal Waters
July 6	"Gypsy Woman (She's Homeless)"	Crystal Waters
July 13	"Gypsy Woman (She's Homeless)"	Crystal Waters
July 20	"Gypsy Woman (She's Homeless)"	Crystal Waters
July 27	"Rapput (senza fiato)"	Claudio Bisio, Rocco Tanica
August 3	"Rapput (senza fiato)"	Claudio Bisio, Rocco Tanica
August 10	"Gypsy Woman (She's Homeless)"	Crystal Waters
August 17	"Gypsy Woman (She's Homeless)"	Crystal Waters
August 24	"Gypsy Woman (She's Homeless)"	Crystal Waters
August 31	"Rapput (senza fiato)"	Claudio Bisio, Rocco Tanica
September 7	"Rapput (senza fiato)"	Claudio Bisio, Rocco Tanica
September 14	"Rapput (senza fiato)"	Claudio Bisio, Rocco Tanica
September 21	"Rapput (senza fiato)"	Claudio Bisio, Rocco Tanica
September 28	"Rapput (senza fiato)"	Claudio Bisio, Rocco Tanica
October 5	"Rapput (senza fiato)"	Claudio Bisio, Rocco Tanica
October 12	"Rapput (senza fiato)"	Claudio Bisio, Rocco Tanica
October 19	"Rapput (senza fiato)"	Claudio Bisio, Rocco Tanica
October 26	"Rapput (senza fiato)"	Claudio Bisio, Rocco Tanica
November 2	"The Fly"	U2
November 9	"The Fly"	U2
November 16	"The Fly"	U2
November 23	"Black or White"	Michael Jackson
November 30	"Black or White"	Michael Jackson
December 7	"Black or White"	Michael Jackson
December 14	"Black or White"	Michael Jackson
December 21	"Black or White"	Michael Jackson
December 28	"Black or White"	Michael Jackson
