= List of number-one hits of 1966 (Italy) =

This is a list of the number-one hits of 1966 on Italian Hit Parade Singles Chart.

Issue date	Song	Artist
January 1	"Plip!"	Rita Pavone
January 8	"La festa"	Adriano Celentano
January 15	"La festa"	Adriano Celentano
January 22	"Plip!"	Rita Pavone
January 29	"Lei"	Adamo
February 5	"Dio, come ti amo"	Domenico Modugno
February 12	"Nessuno mi può giudicare"	Caterina Caselli
February 19	"Nessuno mi può giudicare"	Caterina Caselli
February 26	"Nessuno mi può giudicare"	Caterina Caselli
March 5	"Nessuno mi può giudicare"	Caterina Caselli
March 12	"Nessuno mi può giudicare"	Caterina Caselli
March 19	"Nessuno mi può giudicare"	Caterina Caselli
March 26	"Nessuno mi può giudicare"	Caterina Caselli
April 2	"Nessuno mi può giudicare"	Caterina Caselli
April 9	"Nessuno mi può giudicare"	Caterina Caselli
April 16	"Nessuno mi può giudicare"	Caterina Caselli
April 23	"Nessuno mi può giudicare"	Caterina Caselli
April 30	"Michelle"	The Beatles
May 7	"Michelle"	The Beatles
May 14	"Michelle"	The Beatles
May 21	"Michelle"	The Beatles
May 28	"Michelle"	The Beatles
June 4	"Michelle"	The Beatles
June 11	"Michelle"	The Beatles
June 18	"Qui ritornerà"	Rita Pavone
June 25	"Michelle"	The Beatles
July 2	"Tema"	I Giganti
July 9	"Tema"	I Giganti
July 16	"Tema"	I Giganti
July 23	"Tema"	I Giganti
July 30	"Tema"	I Giganti
August 6	"Tema"	I Giganti
August 13	"Tema"	I Giganti
August 20	"Che colpa abbiamo noi"	The Rokes
August 27	"Notte di ferragosto"	Gianni Morandi
September 3	"Notte di ferragosto"	Gianni Morandi
September 10	"Notte di ferragosto"	Gianni Morandi
September 17	"Strangers in the Night"	Frank Sinatra
September 24	"Strangers in the Night"	Frank Sinatra
October 1	"Strangers in the Night"	Frank Sinatra
October 8	"Strangers in the Night"	Frank Sinatra
October 15	"Strangers in the Night"	Frank Sinatra
October 22	"Strangers in the Night"	Frank Sinatra
October 29	"Strangers in the Night"	Frank Sinatra
November 5	"Strangers in the Night"	Frank Sinatra
November 12	"Strangers in the Night"	Frank Sinatra
November 19	"Strangers in the Night"	Frank Sinatra
November 26	"Bang Bang"	Equipe 84
December 3	"Bang Bang"	Equipe 84
December 10	"Bang Bang"	Equipe 84
December 17	"Bang Bang"	Equipe 84
December 24	"E' la pioggia che va"	The Rokes
December 31	"Bang Bang"	Dalida

== See also ==
- 1966 in music
- List of number-one hits in Italy
