= List of number-one hits of 1961 (Italy) =

This is a list of the number-one hits of 1961 on Italian Hit Parade Singles Chart.

Key
Indicates best-performing single of 1961

Issue date	Song	Artist
January 7	"Il cielo in una stanza"	Mina
January 14	"Il cielo in una stanza"	Mina
January 21	"Il cielo in una stanza"	Mina
January 28	"What a Sky (Su nel cielo)"	Nico Fidenco
February 4	"What a Sky (Su nel cielo)"	Nico Fidenco
February 11	"24.000 baci"	Adriano Celentano
February 18	"24.000 baci"	Adriano Celentano
February 25	"24.000 baci"	Adriano Celentano
March 4	"24.000 baci"	Adriano Celentano
March 11	"24.000 baci"	Adriano Celentano
March 18	"Come sinfonia"	Pino Donaggio
March 25	"Come sinfonia"	Pino Donaggio
April 1	"Come sinfonia"	Pino Donaggio
April 8	"Jealous of You"	Connie Francis
April 15	"Jealous of You"	Connie Francis
April 22	"Jealous of You"	Connie Francis
April 29	"Jealous of You"	Connie Francis
May 6	"Jealous of You"	Connie Francis
May 13	"Where the Boys Are"	Connie Francis
May 20	"Where the Boys Are"	Connie Francis
May 27	"Where the Boys Are"	Connie Francis
June 3	"Where the Boys Are"	Connie Francis
June 10	"Where the Boys Are"	Connie Francis
June 17	"Il mondo di Suzie Wong"	Nico Fidenco
June 24	"Legata a un granello di sabbia"	Nico Fidenco
July 1	"Il mondo di Suzie Wong"	Nico Fidenco
July 8	"Legata a un granello di sabbia"	Nico Fidenco
July 15	"Legata a un granello di sabbia"	Nico Fidenco
July 22	"Legata a un granello di sabbia"	Nico Fidenco
July 29	"Legata a un granello di sabbia"	Nico Fidenco
August 5	"Legata a un granello di sabbia"	Nico Fidenco
August 12	"Legata a un granello di sabbia"	Nico Fidenco
August 19	"Legata a un granello di sabbia"	Nico Fidenco
August 26	"Legata a un granello di sabbia"	Nico Fidenco
September 2	"Legata a un granello di sabbia"	Nico Fidenco
September 9	"La novia"	Domenico Modugno
September 16	"La novia"	Tony Dallara
September 23	"La novia"	Domenico Modugno
September 30	"La novia"	Domenico Modugno
October 7	"Pepito"	Los Machucambos
October 14	"La novia"	Antonio Prieto
October 21	"La novia"	Domenico Modugno
October 28	"La novia"	Tony Dallara
November 4	"La novia"	Domenico Modugno
November 11	"La novia"	Domenico Modugno
November 18	"Nata per me"	Adriano Celentano
November 25	"Nata per me"	Adriano Celentano
December 2	"Nata per me"	Adriano Celentano
December 9	"Nata per me"	Adriano Celentano
December 16	"Nata per me"	Adriano Celentano
December 23	"La ballata della tromba"	Nini Rosso
December 30	"Nata per me"	Adriano Celentano

== See also ==
- 1961 in music
- List of number-one hits in Italy
