= List of number-one hits of 1997 (Italy) =

This is a list of the number-one singles of 1997 in Italy. Musica e dischi, the oldest music industry publication in Italy, had published the record chart since 1960, ranking the weekly best-selling singles in the country. The Musica e dischi chart was regularly featured on the Hits of the World section of Billboard magazine in the United States, as well as pan-European music industry publication Music & Media. In January 1997, the Federazione Industria Musicale Italiana (FIMI) started its own chart, which replaced Musica e dischi's as the official Italian singles chart.

== Chart history ==
Musica e dischi Singles Chart
Week	Single	Artist(s)	Ref.
1	"One and One"	Robert Miles and Maria Nayler	
2	"One and One"	Robert Miles and Maria Nayler	
3	"One and One"	Robert Miles and Maria Nayler	
4	"One and One"	Robert Miles and Maria Nayler	
5	"Let a Boy Cry"	Gala	
FIMI Singles Chart
Week	Single	Artist(s)	Ref.
6	"Barrel of a Gun"	Depeche Mode	
7	"Discothèque"	U2	
8	"Discothèque"	U2	
9	"Discothèque"	U2	
10	"Discothèque"	U2	
11	"Discothèque"	U2	
12	"Laura non c'è"	Nek	
13	"2 the Night"	La Fuertezza	
14	"It's No Good"	Depeche Mode	
15	"It's No Good"	Depeche Mode	
16	"Your Woman"	White Town	
17	"Blood on the Dance Floor"	Michael Jackson	
18	"Blood on the Dance Floor"	Michael Jackson	
19	"Blood on the Dance Floor"	Michael Jackson	
20	"Blood on the Dance Floor"	Michael Jackson	
21	"Un giorno così"	883	
22	"Un giorno così"	883	
23	"Wanna B Like a Man"	Simone Jay	
24	"Midnight in Chelsea"	Jon Bon Jovi	
25	"Around the World"	Daft Punk	
26	"Home"	Depeche Mode	
27	"Home"	Depeche Mode	
28	"D'You Know What I Mean?"	Oasis	
29	"D'You Know What I Mean?"	Oasis	
30	"I'll Be Missing You"	Puff Daddy and Faith Evans featuring 112	
31	"I'll Be Missing You"	Puff Daddy and Faith Evans featuring 112	
32	"I'll Be Missing You"	Puff Daddy and Faith Evans featuring 112	
33	"I'll Be Missing You"	Puff Daddy and Faith Evans featuring 112	
34	"I'll Be Missing You"	Puff Daddy and Faith Evans featuring 112	
35	"Bitter Sweet Symphony"	The Verve	
36	"I'll Be Missing You"	Puff Daddy and Faith Evans featuring 112	
37	"I'll Be Missing You"	Puff Daddy and Faith Evans featuring 112	
38	"Something About the Way You Look Tonight" / "Candle in the Wind 1997"	Elton John	
39	"Something About the Way You Look Tonight" / "Candle in the Wind 1997"	Elton John	
40	"Something About the Way You Look Tonight" / "Candle in the Wind 1997"	Elton John	
41	"Something About the Way You Look Tonight" / "Candle in the Wind 1997"	Elton John	
42	"Something About the Way You Look Tonight" / "Candle in the Wind 1997"	Elton John	
43	"Something About the Way You Look Tonight" / "Candle in the Wind 1997"	Elton John	
44	"Something About the Way You Look Tonight" / "Candle in the Wind 1997"	Elton John	
45	"Something About the Way You Look Tonight" / "Candle in the Wind 1997"	Elton John	
46	"Breathe"	Midge Ure	
47	"Breathe"	Midge Ure	
48	"Something About the Way You Look Tonight" / "Candle in the Wind 1997"	Elton John	
49	"Something About the Way You Look Tonight" / "Candle in the Wind 1997"	Elton John	
50	"Breathe"	Midge Ure	
51	"Breathe"	Midge Ure	
52	"Something About the Way You Look Tonight" / "Candle in the Wind 1997"	Elton John	
