= Imaste dio =

"Imaste dio - ΕΙΜΑΣΤΕ ΔΥΟ"

Song
- Language: Greek
- English title: "We Are Two"
- Published: 1968
- Songwriter: Mikis Theodorakis

Imaste dio, Ímaste dió or Eimaste dio (Greek: Είμαστε δυο, meaning 'We are two') is a song by Mikis Theodorakis, the leftist Greek composer and politician.

== Background ==
Ímaste dió was one of the songs written by Mikis Theodorakis for prominent member of the Greek left Andreas Lentakis (1935-1997) towards the end of the 1960s. At the time of the 7 year military dictatorship in Greece this song, whose theme was the torture and isolation of a political detainee in prison, became a major rallying cry of the Greek leftwing political groups. The song is also featured in a comedy by Thanasis Veggos about the forbidden songs in Greece during the time of the Colonels.

== Versions ==
A French version of Eimaste Dio, Nous sommes deux, was popularized by singer Georges Moustaki in the 1970s. A second version was recorded with different lyrics by singer Dalida with the title A chaque fois j'y crois in 1977.

A Swedish version, Två, was recorded by singer Sven-Bertil Taube in 1974.

Moustaki's "Nous sommes deux" can be heard in the eponymous television documentary by Robert Manthoulis filmed for French television in 1970 and on the soundtrack of the 2006 film Salvador.
