= Drupi =

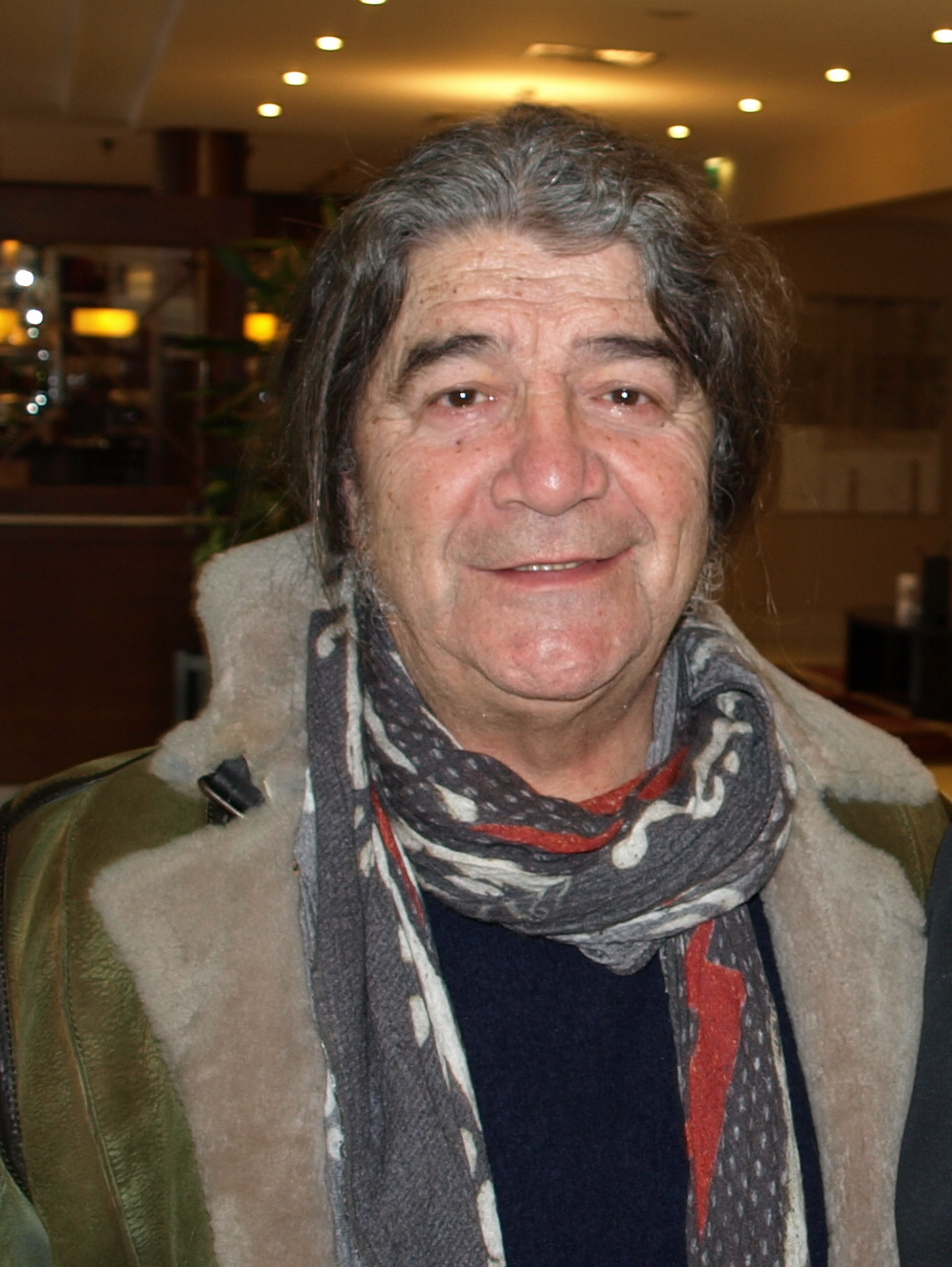
- Drupi (2014)

Background information
- Born: Giampiero Anelli; 10 August 1947 (age 79); Pavia, Italy
- Origin: Pavia, Italy
- Genre: Rock and roll
- Years active: 1967–present
- Website: www.drupi.it

Giampiero Anelli (born 10 August 1947), best known as Drupi, is an Italian rock singer, best known for the songs "Vado via", "Piccola e fragile", "Sereno è" and "Due".

== Background ==
Born in Pavia, Drupi, a former plumber whose hobby was fishing, started his career as lead singer of the band Le Calamite ("The Magnets"). Having been noticed by songwriters Luigi Albertelli and Enrico Riccardi, he entered the 1973 Sanremo Music Festival competition with the song "Vado via". The song ended in last place but achieved significant international success and launched his solo career. "Vado via", recorded on A & M Records, reached number 17 in the UK chart in January 1974 (remaining one of the very few songs not sung in English to enter the UK charts). National popularity arrived in the same year with the song "Piccola e fragile", which topped the Italian hit parade.

A singer from a rhythm and blues background, his popularity remains linked to several pop and soft rock hits. In 1975, he won the Festivalbar with the song "Due". He has returned several times to the Sanremo Music Festival, achieving third place in 1982 with the song "Soli".

His stage name is a reference to the Tex Avery character Droopy. He has been living in Austria since 2010.

== Discography ==
=== Selected singles ===
- 1973: "Vado via" (original version)
- 1973: "She (Didn't Remember My Name)"
- 1974: "Piccola e fragile"
- 1975: "Due"
- 1975: "Sereno è..."
- 1976: "Bella bellissima"
- 1976: "Sambariò"
- 1977: "Con fantasia"
- 1977: "Come va..."
- 1978: "Gentea"
- 1978: "Paese"
- 1978: "Provincia"
- 1979: "Una come te"
- 1979: "E grido e vivo e amo"
- 1979: "Buona notte"
- 1979: "Můj sen je touha žít" (based on Vado Via, Hana Zagorová & Drupi)
- 1980: "Setkání" / "Kam Jsi To Letět Chtěl, Ptáčku Můj" (Hana Zagorová & Drupi)
- 1980: "Sera"
- 1981: "La mia canzone al vento"
- 1981: "Princess of the Night" / "Stai con me"
- 1982: "Soli"
- 1983: "Regalami un sorriso"
- 1983: "Canta"
- 1984: "I Feel for You" / "Fammi volare"
- 1988: "Era bella davvero"
- 1992: "Un uomo in più"

=== Studio albums ===
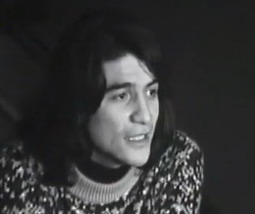
Drupi in 1975

- 1974: Drupi
- 1974: Sereno è...
- 1975: Due
- 1976: Drupi (La visiera si stacca e si indossa!)
- 1977: Di solito la gente mi chiama Drupi
- 1978: Provincia
- 1979: E grido e vivo e amo
- 1981: Drupi
- 1983: Canta
- 1985: Un passo
- 1989: Drupi
- 1990: Avanti
- 1992: Amica mia
- 1993: Storie d'amore
- 1995: Voglio una donna
- 1997: Bella e strega
- 2004: Buone notizie
- 2007: Fuori target
- 2013: Ho sbagliato secolo
