= List of number-one hits of 1971 (Italy) =

This is a list of the number-one hits of 1971 on Italian Hit Parade Singles Chart.

Issue date	Song	Artist
January 2	"Anna"	Lucio Battisti
January 9	"Anna"	Lucio Battisti
January 16	"Vent'anni"	Massimo Ranieri
January 23	"Vent'anni"	Massimo Ranieri
January 30	"Vent'anni"	Massimo Ranieri
February 6	"Vent'anni"	Massimo Ranieri
February 13	"Vent'anni"	Massimo Ranieri
February 20	"Vent'anni"	Massimo Ranieri
February 27	"Vent'anni"	Massimo Ranieri
March 6	"Vent'anni"	Massimo Ranieri
March 13	"Il cuore e' uno zingaro"	Nicola Di Bari
March 20	"Il cuore e' uno zingaro"	Nicola Di Bari
March 27	"Il cuore e' uno zingaro"	Nicola Di Bari
April 3	"Il cuore e' uno zingaro"	Nicola Di Bari
April 10	"Il cuore e' uno zingaro"	Nicola Di Bari
April 17	"4/3/1943"	Lucio Dalla
April 24	"Il cuore e' uno zingaro"	Nicola Di Bari
May 1	"4/3/1943"	Lucio Dalla
May 8	"4/3/1943"	Lucio Dalla
May 15	"Love Story"	Francis Lai
May 22	"Love Story"	Francis Lai
May 29	"Love Story"	Francis Lai
June 5	"Pensieri e parole"	Lucio Battisti
June 12	"Pensieri e parole"	Lucio Battisti
June 19	"Pensieri e parole"	Lucio Battisti
June 26	"Pensieri e parole"	Lucio Battisti
July 3	"Pensieri e parole"	Lucio Battisti
July 10	"Pensieri e parole"	Lucio Battisti
July 17	"Pensieri e parole"	Lucio Battisti
July 24	"Pensieri e parole"	Lucio Battisti
July 31	"Pensieri e parole"	Lucio Battisti
August 7	"Pensieri e parole"	Lucio Battisti
August 14	"Pensieri e parole"	Lucio Battisti
August 21	"Pensieri e parole"	Lucio Battisti
August 28	"Pensieri e parole"	Lucio Battisti
September 4	"Pensieri e parole"	Lucio Battisti
September 11	"Tanta voglia di lei"	Pooh
September 18	"Tanta voglia di lei"	Pooh
September 25	"Tanta voglia di lei"	Pooh
October 2	"Tanta voglia di lei"	Pooh
October 9	"Tanta voglia di lei"	Pooh
October 16	"Tanta voglia di lei"	Pooh
October 23	"Tanta voglia di lei"	Pooh
October 30	"Tanta voglia di lei"	Pooh
November 6	"Tanta voglia di lei"	Pooh
November 13	"Tanta voglia di lei"	Pooh
November 20	"Amore caro amore bello"	Bruno Lauzi
November 27	"Mamy Blue"	Pop Tops
December 4	"Mamy Blue"	Pop Tops
December 11	"Pensiero"	Pooh
December 18	"Pensiero"	Pooh
December 25	"Pensiero"	Pooh

== Number-one artists ==
Position	Artist	Weeks #1
1	Lucio Battisti	16
2	Pooh	13
3	Massimo Ranieri	8
4	Nicola Di Bari	6
5	Francis Lai	3
5	Lucio Dalla	3
6	Pop Tops	2
7	Bruno Lauzi	1

== See also ==
- 1971 in music
