= List of number-one hits of 1972 (Italy) =

This is a list of the number-one hits of 1972 on Italian Hit Parade Singles Chart.

Issue date	Song	Artist
January 1	"Pensiero"	Pooh
January 8	"Pensiero"	Pooh
January 15	"Pensiero"	Pooh
January 22	"La canzone del sole"	Lucio Battisti
January 29	"Chitarra suona più piano"	Nicola Di Bari
February 5	"Chitarra suona più piano"	Nicola Di Bari
February 12	"Chitarra suona più piano"	Nicola Di Bari
February 19	"Chitarra suona più piano"	Nicola Di Bari
February 26	"Chitarra suona più piano"	Nicola Di Bari
March 4	"Chitarra suona più piano"	Nicola Di Bari
March 11	"Imagine"	John Lennon
March 18	"Jesahel"	Delirium
March 25	"Jesahel"	Delirium
April 1	"Jesahel"	Delirium
April 8	"Jesahel"	Delirium
April 15	"Jesahel"	Delirium
April 22	"Jesahel"	Delirium
April 29	"Grande, grande, grande"	Mina
May 6	"Grande, grande, grande"	Mina
May 13	"Grande, grande, grande"	Mina
May 20	"Grande, grande, grande"	Mina
May 27	"I giardini di marzo"	Lucio Battisti
June 3	"I giardini di marzo"	Lucio Battisti
June 10	"I giardini di marzo"	Lucio Battisti
June 17	"I giardini di marzo"	Lucio Battisti
June 24	"I giardini di marzo"	Lucio Battisti
July 1	"I giardini di marzo"	Lucio Battisti
July 8	"I giardini di marzo"	Lucio Battisti
July 15	"Quanto è bella lei"	Gianni Nazzaro
July 22	"Quanto è bella lei"	Gianni Nazzaro
July 29	"Quanto è bella lei"	Gianni Nazzaro
August 5	"Quanto è bella lei"	Gianni Nazzaro
August 12	"Quanto è bella lei"	Gianni Nazzaro
August 19	"Quanto è bella lei"	Gianni Nazzaro
August 26	"Viaggio di un poeta"	Dik Dik
September 2	"Viaggio di un poeta"	Dik Dik
September 9	"Viaggio di un poeta"	Dik Dik
September 16	"Il padrino"	Santo & Johnny
September 23	"Il padrino"	Santo & Johnny
September 30	"Il padrino"	Santo & Johnny
October 7	"Il padrino"	Santo & Johnny
October 14	"Il padrino"	Santo & Johnny
October 21	"Il padrino"	Santo & Johnny
October 28	"Il padrino"	Santo & Johnny
November 4	"Il padrino"	Santo & Johnny
November 11	"Il padrino"	Santo & Johnny
November 18	"Il padrino"	Santo & Johnny
November 25	"Il padrino"	Santo & Johnny
December 2	"Il padrino"	Santo & Johnny
December 9	"Il padrino"	Santo & Johnny
December 16	"Questo piccolo grande amore"	Claudio Baglioni
December 23	"Questo piccolo grande amore"	Claudio Baglioni
December 30	"Questo piccolo grande amore"	Claudio Baglioni

== Number-one artists ==
Position	Artist	Weeks #1
1	Santo & Johnny	13
2	Lucio Battisti	8
3	Delirium	6
3	Gianni Nazzaro	6
3	Nicola Di Bari	6
4	Mina	4
5	Claudio Baglioni	3
5	Dik Dik	3
5	Pooh	3
6	John Lennon	1

== See also ==
- 1972 in music
