= Georges Moustaki =

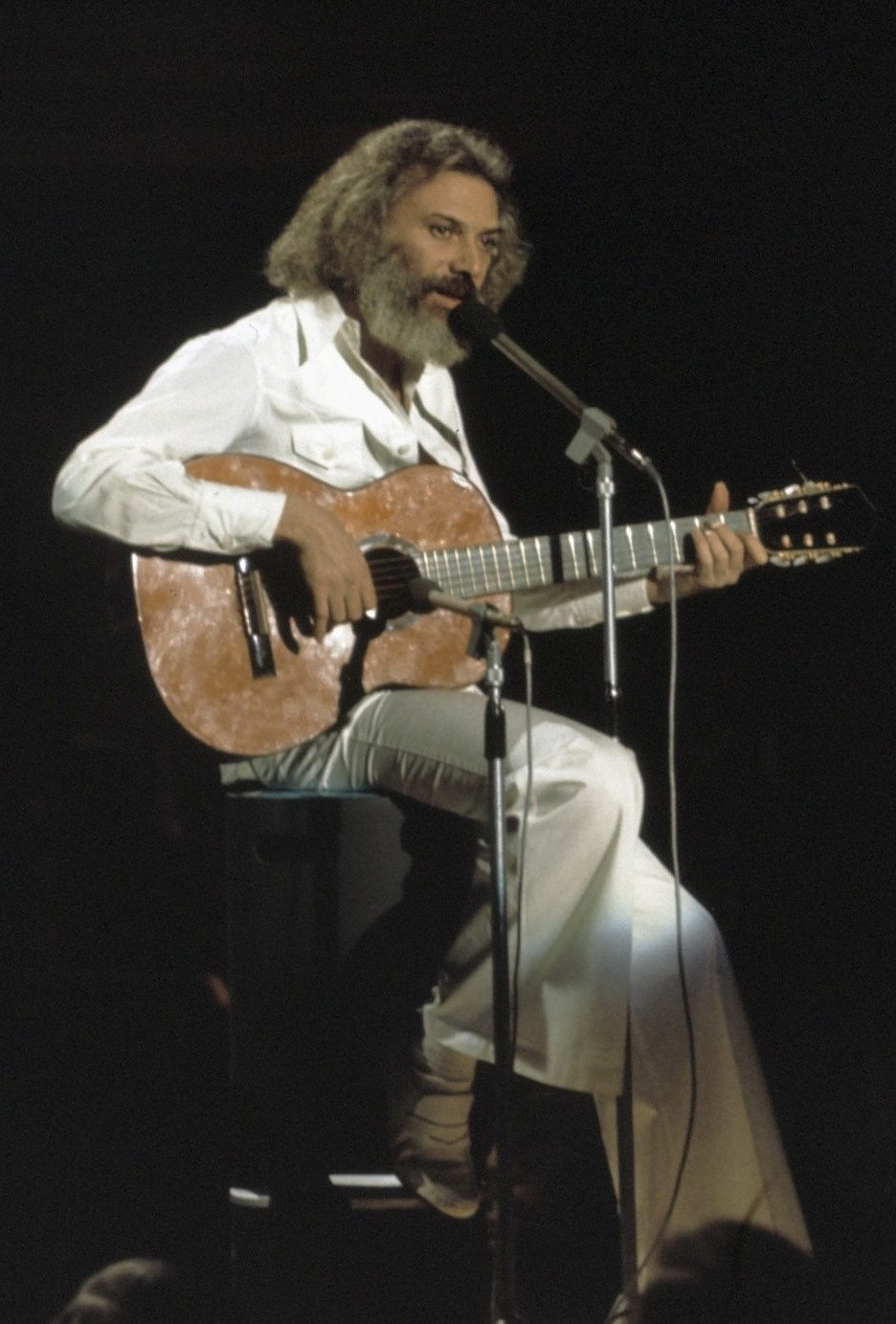
- At the Grand Gala du Disque Populaire, 1974

Background information
- Born: Giuseppe Mustacchi; 3 May 1934; Alexandria, Egypt
- Died: 23 May 2013 (aged 79) Nice, France
- Occupations: Singer; songwriter
- Instruments: Vocals; guitar; piano

Georges Moustaki (born Giuseppe Mustacchi; 3 May 1934 – 23 May 2013) was an Egyptian-French singer-songwriter of Greek-Jewish origin. He wrote about 300 songs for some of the most popular singers in France, including Édith Piaf, Dalida, Françoise Hardy, Yves Montand, Barbara, Brigitte Fontaine, Herbert Pagani, France Gall, Cindy Daniel, Juliette Gréco, Pia Colombo, and Tino Rossi, as well as for himself.

== Early life ==
Georges Moustaki was born Giuseppe Mustacchi in Alexandria, Egypt, on 3 May 1934. His parents, Sarah and Nessim Mustacchi, were Francophile, Greek Jews from the ancient Romaniote Jewish community. Originally from the Greek island of Corfu, they moved to Egypt, where Giuseppe was born and first learned French. They owned the Cité du Livre bookshop in the cosmopolitan city of Alexandria, where many ethnic communities lived together.

Moustaki's father spoke five languages and his mother spoke six. The young Giuseppe and his two older sisters spoke Italian at home and Arabic in the streets. Their parents placed Giuseppe and his sisters in a French school where they learned to speak French.

== Life in France ==
At the age of 17, after a summer holiday in Paris, Moustaki obtained his father's permission to move there, working as a door-to-door salesman of poetry books. He began playing the piano and singing in nightclubs in Paris, where he met some of the era's best-known performers. His career took off after the young singer-songwriter Georges Brassens took Moustaki under his wing. Brassens introduced him to artists and intellectuals who spent much of their time around Saint-Germain-des-Prés. Out of gratitude, Moustaki adopted the first name of the only musician he called "master".

Moustaki said that his taste for music came from hearing various French singers – Édith Piaf, Charles Trenet, Henri Salvador, Georges Ulmer, Yves Montand, Georges Guétary and Luis Mariano – sing.

Moustaki was introduced to Édith Piaf in the late 1950s by a friend whose praise of the young songwriter was so flattering that Piaf, then at the peak of her fame, requested somewhat sarcastically to hear him sing his best works. "I picked up a guitar and I was lamentable. But something must have touched her. She asked me to go and see her perform that same evening at the Olympia music hall and to show her later the songs I had just massacred."

He soon began writing songs for Piaf, one of which, Milord, about a lower-class girl who falls in love with an upper-class British traveller, reached number one in Germany in 1960 and number 24 in the British charts the same year. It has since been performed by numerous artists, including Bobby Darin and Cher.

Piaf was captivated by Moustaki's music, as well as his great charm. Piaf liked how his musical compositions were flavored with jazz and styles that went beyond France's borders. Moustaki and Piaf became lovers and embarked on what the newspaper Libération described as a year of "devastating, mad love", with the newspapers following "the 'scandal' of the 'gigolo' and his dame day after day".

After a decade of composing songs for various famous singers, Moustaki launched a successful career as a performer himself, singing in French, Italian, English, Greek, Portuguese, Arabic and Spanish.

Moustaki's songwriting career peaked in the 1960s and 1970s with songs like "Sarah", performed by Serge Reggiani, and "La Longue Dame brune", written for the singer Barbara (Monique Serf).

In 1969 Moustaki composed the song "Le Métèque" — 'métèque' is a pejorative word for a shifty-looking immigrant of Mediterranean origin – in which he described himself as a "wandering Jew" and a "Greek shepherd". Serge Reggiani rejected it and the record companies refused to produce it. Moustaki then sang it himself, on a 45 rpm disc, and it became a huge hit in France, spending six non-consecutive weeks at number one in the charts. "A small, subliminal settling of scores became the hymn of anti-racism and the right to be different, the cry of revolt of all minorities," Moustaki said of the song.

In 1971 Moustaki adapted the Ennio Morricone/Joan Baez song "Here's to You" under the new title "Marche de Sacco et Vanzetti" for his album "Il y avait un jardin" ("There was a garden").

In 1972 Moustaki popularized the translation of two songs by Mikis Theodorakis, "l'Homme au cœur blessé" and "Nous sommes deux", the former known in transliterated Greek as "Stou pikramenou tin avli", the latter being a French version of the political protest song Imaste dio.

Moustaki's philosophy was reflected in his 1973 song "Déclaration": "I declare a permanent state of happiness and the right of everyone to every privilege. I say that suffering is a sacrilege when there are roses and white bread for everyone."

Moustaki became a French citizen in 1985.

In 2008, after a 50-year career during which he performed on every continent, Moustaki recorded his last album, Solitaire. On it, he recorded two songs with China Forbes.

In 2009, in a packed concert hall in Barcelona, he told the stunned audience that he was giving his last public performance as he would no longer be capable of singing because of an irreversible bronchial illness.

Moustaki married Annick "Yannick" Cozannec when he was twenty years old and she was twenty-five. Their daughter, Pia, was born the following year. They lived in an apartment at rue des Deux-Ponts on the Île Saint-Louis in Paris for many years, before his lung illness forced him to leave his beloved Paris to seek out warmer and cleaner air in the French Riviera.

In his last interview given to Nice-Matin newspaper in February 2013, Moustaki said, "I regret not being able to sing in my bathroom. But singing in public, no. I've done it all.... I've witnessed magical moments."

== Death, tributes and funeral ==
Georges Moustaki died on 23 May 2013 at a hospital in Nice, France, after a long battle with emphysema.

The French president, François Hollande, called Moustaki a "hugely talented artist whose popular and committed songs have marked generations of French people". French Culture Minister Aurélie Filippetti hailed Moustaki as an "artist with convictions who conveyed humanist values ... and a great poet". Paris Mayor Bertrand Delanoë remembered Moustaki as "a citizen of the world who was in love with liberty, a true rebel until his last days", who had given France "unforgettable compositions and lyrics". Juliette Gréco, one of France's biggest singers in the 1960s, grieved the loss of a "poet" and "unique person". "He was a fine, elegant man who was infinitely kind and talented," she told RTL radio.

Moustaki's funeral was held on 27 May 2013. It was attended by his widow Annick Cozannec and their daughter Pia, the French Culture Minister Aurélie Filippetti and numerous personalities from the entertainment world – Guy Bedos, Véronique Genest, Maxime Le Forestier, Jacques Higelin, Brigitte Fontaine, Arthur H, Valérie Mairesse, Hervé Vilard, Irène Jacob, François Corbier, Cali, Sapho, Enrico Macias, François Morel, Costa Gavras.

Moustaki was buried according to Jewish rites in a family vault at the Père Lachaise Cemetery in Paris a few meters from the grave of his former amour Édith Piaf.

== Discography ==
=== Studio albums ===
- 1961 : Les Orteils au soleil
- 1969 : Le Métèque
- 1971 : Il y avait un jardin
- 1972 : Danse
- 1973 : Déclaration
- 1974 : Les Amis de Georges
- 1975 : Humblement il est venu
- 1976 : Prélude
- 1977 : Espérance (Nos enfants)
- 1979 : Si je pouvais t’aider
- 1979 : Et pourtant dans le monde
- 1981 : C’est là
- 1982 : Moustaki et Flairck
- 1984 : Pornographie
- 1986 : Joujou
- 1992 : Méditerranéen
- 1993 : Lo Straniero (Italian compilation)
- 1996 : Tout reste à dire
- 2003 : Odéon
- 2005 : Vagabond
- 2008 : Solitaire

=== Concert albums ===
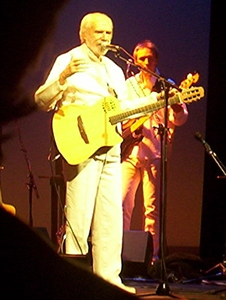
Georges Moustaki at the Théâtre du Rond-Point, December 2005

- 1970 : Bobino 70 – Le temps de vivre
- 1973 : Concert
- 1975 : Live
- 1978 : Olympia
- 1988 : Au Déjazet
- 2001 : Olympia 2000
- 2002 : Presque en solo – Live à la Philharmonie de Berlin (Troubadour Records)
- 2015 : En live au Troubadour Festival 1995 (Troubadour Records)

All double albums except for Bobino 70 and En live au Troubadour Festival 1995 which is for download only.

=== Main compilations ===
- 1989 : Ballades en balade [4 CD box-set, 87 titles with lyrics]
- 2002 : Tout Moustaki ou presque... [10 CD box-set, 222 titles (some previously unreleased from 1960) with lyrics and 84-page booklet]
- 2006 : Gold [double CD with 45 titles]
- 2007 : Les 50 plus belles chansons de Georges Moustaki [3 CD box-set]
- 2012 : 4 albums originaux [4 CD box-set: Le Métèque, Il y avait un jardin, Danse and Les amis de Georges ]
- 2013 : Gold

=== Soundtracks ===
- 1962 : Jusqu’au bout du monde, dir. François Villiers : one instrumental and one song performed by Tino Rossi (EP Columbia ESRF 1381)
- 1963 : Le Roi du village, dir. Henri Gruel : one instrumental and "Venez les filles", sung by Les Chats Sauvages (EP Pathé Marconi EG 659)
- 1966 : Cécilia, médecin de campagne, TV series, dir. André Michel : two instrumentals (EP Ducretet Thomson 460 V 720)
- 1968 : Les Hors-la-loi, dir. Tewfik Farès
- 1969 : Le Temps de vivre, dir. Bernard Paul : "Le Temps de vivre" sung by Henia Ziv and one instrumental (single Polydor 66 708)
- 1969 : L'Américain, dir. Marcel Bozzuffi : two instrumentals (single United Artists / EMI C 006-90521)
- 1969 : La Fiancée du pirate, dir. Nelly Kaplan : "Moi je me balance" sung by Barbara (single Philips 336 279)
- 1970 : Le Client de la morte saison, dir. Moshé Mizrahi
- 1970 : Solo, dir. Jean-Pierre Mocky : two instrumentals (Polydor 2056 018)
- 1970 : Le Pistonné, dir. Claude Berri : three instrumentals (EP Barclay 71 435)
- 1972 : Mendiants et Orgueilleux, dir. Jacques Poitrenaud : Moustaki sings two songs he composed for the film Mendiants et Orgueilleux and La blessure (single Polydor 2056 134)
- 1972 : Le Trèfle à cinq feuilles, dir. Edmond Freess : composer with Hubert Rostaing (single Polydor 2056 164)
- 1979 : Au bout du bout du banc, dir. Peter Kassovitz : two instrumentals (Festival/Musidisc SPX 232)
- 2009 : Mirrors For Princes, dir. Lior Shamriz : Joseph (Polydor 184 350)

=== Collaborations ===
- 1979 : La belle histoire de l'enfant qui possède tout, after the 10th chant of Bhâgavata Purâna, with, among others, the band Garana, Patrick Bernard, Christian Chevalier, Rosy Varte and Henri Virlogeux (Kaṁsa). Double album, produced by Alain Rémila, Gopal Productions RP104/RP106

== Filmography ==
=== Cinema ===
- 1970: Solo as the film's composer
- 1972 : Mendiants et Orgueilleux directed by Jacques Poitrenaud : as "Hadjis"

=== Television ===
- 1981 : Livingstone, TV movie directed by Jean Chapot : as "Livingstone"
- 1990 : Les Mouettes, TV movie directed by Jean Chapot : as "Mathieu"
- 1998 : Le Comte de Monte-Cristo, mini-series directed by Josée Dayan : as "Father Faria"
- 2006 : Navarro, TV series, episode "Jour de colère" : as "Nourredine"

== Covers ==
- In 2019, Catalan singer-songwriter Marina Rossell released the album "Canta Moustaki y Canciones de la Resistencia" ("Sings Moustaki's Songs and Songs of the Resistance") with Spanish-language versions several of Moustaki's songs, including "El meteco" ("La métèque"), "Mi soledad" ("Ma solitude"), and "Mi libertad" ("Ma liberté").
- In 2021, Catalan singer-songwriter Cesk Freixas released the album "Memòria" ("Memory") including the Catalan-language version of "Ma liberté" entitled "Ma llibertat"
- In 2022, Italian singer-songwriter Nicola Di Bari released the album "Esenciales" ("Essentials") including an Italian-language version of "Ma liberté" entitled "La Mia Libterà"
- In 2020, Galician band Barahúnda released the album "Onde vai o mar" ("Where does the sea go") including a Galician-language version of "Ma liberté" entitled "A miña liberdade"
