= La collina dei ciliegi =

Single by Lucio Battisti

from the album Il nostro caro angelo
- B-side: "Il nostro caro angelo"
- Released: 1973
- Genre: Pop
- Label: Numero Uno
- Songwriter(s): Lucio Battisti, Mogol

Lucio Battisti singles chronology
"Il mio canto libero" (1972)	"La collina dei ciliegi" (1973)	"Ancora tu" (1976)

Audio
- "La collina dei ciliegi" on YouTube

"La collina dei ciliegi" (lit. 'The cherry tree hill') is a 1973 song composed by Lucio Battisti (music) and Mogol (lyrics), arranged by Gian Piero Reverberi and performed by Lucio Battisti.

The complex lyrics, behind the metaphorical story of two lovers, are a more general invitation to abandon prudence and traditions and embrace freedom. The song has been described as "an iridescent folk rock that revives Mogol's pantheism, rudimentary but effective".

Battisti recorded the song in Spanish as "La colina de las cerazas".

== Track listing ==
No.	Title	Length
1.	"La collina dei ciliegi"	4:58
2.	"Il nostro caro angelo"	4:13

== Charts ==
Chart (1973–4)	Peak position
Italy (Musica e dischi)	1

== Certifications ==
Region	Certification	Certified units/sales
Italy (FIMI) Sales since 2009	Platinum	100,000^{‡}
^{‡} Sales+streaming figures based on certification alone.
