= List of number-one hits of 1988 (Italy) =

This is a list of the number-one hits of 1988 on Italian Hit Parade Singles Chart.

| Issue Date | Song | Artist(s) |
|---|---|---|
| January 2 | "La Bamba" | Los Lobos |
| January 9 | "La Bamba" | Los Lobos |
| January 16 | "La Bamba" | Los Lobos |
| January 23 | "La Bamba" | Los Lobos |
| January 30 | "La Bamba" | Los Lobos |
| February 6 | "Pump Up the Volume" | MARRS |
| February 13 | "Sì, la vita è tutta un quiz" | Renzo Arbore |
| February 20 | "Sì, la vita è tutta un quiz" | Renzo Arbore |
| February 27 | "Sì, la vita è tutta un quiz" | Renzo Arbore |
| March 5 | "Sì, la vita è tutta un quiz" | Renzo Arbore |
| March 12 | "Perdere l'amore" | Massimo Ranieri |
| March 19 | "Perdere l'amore" | Massimo Ranieri |
| March 26 | "Perdere l'amore" | Massimo Ranieri |
| April 2 | "Perdere l'amore" | Massimo Ranieri |
| April 9 | "Perdere l'amore" | Massimo Ranieri |
| April 16 | "L'amore rubato" | Luca Barbarossa |
| April 23 | "L'amore rubato" | Luca Barbarossa |
| April 30 | "L'amore rubato" | Luca Barbarossa |
| May 7 | "L'amore rubato" | Luca Barbarossa |
| May 14 | "I'm Not Scared" | Eighth Wonder |
| May 21 | "I'm Not Scared" | Eighth Wonder |
| May 28 | "I'm Not Scared" | Eighth Wonder |
| June 4 | "Gimme Five" | Jovanotti |
| June 11 | "Gimme Five" | Jovanotti |
| June 18 | "Gimme Five" | Jovanotti |
| June 25 | "Gimme Five" | Jovanotti |
| July 2 | "Tell Me" | Nick Kamen |
| July 9 | "Tell Me" | Nick Kamen |
| July 16 | "Tell Me" | Nick Kamen |
| July 23 | "Tell Me" | Nick Kamen |
| July 30 | "Tell Me" | Nick Kamen |
| August 6 | "Tell Me" | Nick Kamen |
| August 13 | "Tell Me" | Nick Kamen |
| August 20 | "Tell Me" | Nick Kamen |
| August 27 | "Tell Me" | Nick Kamen |
| September 3 | "Gimme Five 2" | Jovanotti |
| September 10 | "Gimme Five 2" | Jovanotti |
| September 17 | "Gimme Five 2" | Jovanotti |
| September 24 | "Gimme Five 2" | Jovanotti |
| October 1 | "Gimme Five 2" | Jovanotti |
| October 8 | "I Don't Want Your Love" | Duran Duran |
| October 15 | "I Don't Want Your Love" | Duran Duran |
| October 22 | "Desire" | U2 |
| October 29 | "Desire" | U2 |
| November 5 | "I Don't Want Your Love" | Duran Duran |
| November 12 | "I Don't Want Your Love" | Duran Duran |
| November 19 | "I Don't Want Your Love" | Duran Duran |
| November 26 | "I Don't Want Your Love" | Duran Duran |
| December 3 | "È qui la festa?" | Jovanotti |
| December 10 | "È qui la festa?" | Jovanotti |
| December 17 | "C'è da spostare una macchina" | Francesco Salvi |
| December 24 | "C'è da spostare una macchina" | Francesco Salvi |
| December 31 | "C'è da spostare una macchina" | Francesco Salvi |

== Number-one artists ==
| Position | Artist | Weeks #1 |
|---|---|---|
| 1 | Jovanotti | 11 |
| 2 | Nick Kamen | 9 |
| 3 | Duran Duran | 6 |
| 4 | Los Lobos | 5 |
| 4 | Massimo Ranieri | 5 |
| 6 | Luca Barbarossa | 4 |
| 6 | Renzo Arbore | 4 |
| 7 | Eighth Wonder | 3 |
| 7 | Francesco Salvi | 3 |
| 9 | U2 | 2 |
| 10 | MARRS | 1 |
