= Attenti al lupo =

Single by Lucio Dalla

from the album Cambio
- Released: 1990
- Label: BMG Ariola

Lucio Dalla singles chronology
"Tempo" (1990)	"Attenti al lupo" (1990)	"Giorni leggeri" (1991)

Music video
- "Attenti al lupo" on YouTube

"Attenti al lupo" (lit. 'Beware of the wolf', released as "Atento al lobo" in its Spanish-language version) is a 1990 song composed by Ron and performed by Lucio Dalla, from his album Cambio.

== Overview ==
"Attenti al lupo"'s original title was "La casina" ("The little house"). Ron originally wrote the song for his album Apri le tue braccia e poi vola, but he eventually discarded it as he felt it didn't fit in with the rest of the material. When Ron invited Lucio Dalla to listen to a preview of his album, he also played him "Attenti al lupo". Dalla loved the song and asked Ron for his permission to record it. "Attenti al lupo" was released as the first single from Dalla's album Cambio. Dalla premiered the song on the RAI TV show Fantastico.

The music video, directed by Ambrogio Lo Giudice, is set in a circus. It features Dalla and vocalists Iskra Menarini and Carolina Balboni performing the song in front of an audience made of girls in school uniform.

== Track listing ==
No.	Title	Length
1.	"Attenti Al Lupo (B.Box Remix)"	6:15
2.	"Attenti Al Lupo (WWF Remix)"	4:36
3.	"Attenti Al Lupo (Acapella)"	3:47

== Charts ==
Chart (1990–1994)	Peak position
Chile (UPI)	2
Europe (European Hot 100 Singles)	71
Iceland (Íslenski listinn)	5
Italy (Musica e dischi)	1
Switzerland (Schweizer Hitparade)	25
Uruguay (UPI)	1

Chart (2012)	Peak position
Italy (FIMI)	17
