= Se non avessi più te =

Single by Gianni Morandi

from the album Gianni 3
- B-side: "I ragazzi dello shake"
- Released: 1965
- Genre: Pop
- Length: 2:47
- Label: RCA Italiana
- Songwriter(s): Franco Migliacci, Luis Bacalov, Bruno Zambrini
- Producer(s): Franco Migliacci

Gianni Morandi singles chronology
"Non son degno di te" (1964)	"Se non avessi più te" (1965)	"Si fa sera" (1965)

Audio
- "Se non avessi più te" on YouTube

"Se non avessi più te" (transl. If I no longer had you) is a 1965 Italian song composed by Franco Migliacci (lyrics) Luis Bacalov and Bruno Zambrini (music) and performed by Gianni Morandi.

== Background ==
The song was runner-up at the 1965 edition of the Cantagiro festival; it was in the lead for all stages of the contest but was eventually overtaken by Rita Pavone with "Lui" in the final stage at Fiuggi, in what became known as the "Fiuggi blitz". The song was a major success, selling over 320,000 copies as of August 1965. It has been described as "a non-obvious melody rich in bel canto reminiscences", which Morandi performed "with great naturalness and without overdoing it".

The song was adapted into a musicarello film with the same title, directed by Ettore Maria Fizzarotti and starring the same Morandi and his future wife Laura Efrikian.

== Track listing ==
No.	Title	Lyrics	Music	Length
1.	"Se non avessi più te"	Franco Migliacci	Bruno Zambrini, Luis Bacalov	2:47
2.	"I ragazzi dello shake"	Migliacci	Zambrini, Bacalov	2:18

== Charts ==
=== Weekly charts ===
Chart (1965)	Peak position
Italy (Musica e dischi)	1
