= Un'estate italiana =

"Un'estate italiana""

Single by Edoardo Bennato and Gianna Nannini Susan Ferrer (Spanish version)
- B-side: "Un'estate italiana" (karaoke version)
- Released: 9 December 1989
- Recorded: 1989
- Genre: Pop rock
- Length: 4:07
- Label: Warner Bros.; Sugar; Virgin
- Composer: Giorgio Moroder
- Lyricists: Gianna Nannini; Edoardo Bennato (Italian); Tom Whitlock (English); Susan Ferrer (Spanish)
- Producer: Giorgio Moroder

Gianna Nannini singles chronology
"Voglio fare l'amore" (1989)	"Un'estate italiana"" (1989)	"Scandalo" (1990)

Edoardo Bennato singles chronology
"Vendo Bagnoli" (1989)	"Un'estate italiana" (1989)	"Il paese dei balocchi" (1992)

Music video
- "Un'estate italiana" on YouTube

"Un'estate italiana" (Italian: [uneˈstaːte itaˈljaːna]), "Un verano italiano" (Spanish: [um beˈɾano itaˈljano]; both meaning "An Italian summer") or "To Be Number One" is a 1989 song composed by Giorgio Moroder which was used as the official song of the 1990 FIFA World Cup held in Italy, the first to hold such distinction.

The Italian version, also known as "Notti magiche" ("Magical nights") in Italy, was recorded by Italian artists Edoardo Bennato and Gianna Nannini, who also wrote the lyrics. The Spanish version, also known as "Noches mágicas" in Spanish, was recorded by Paraguayan Susan Ferrer, who also wrote the lyrics. The English version, with lyrics by Tom Whitlock and performed by Giorgio Moroder Project (singers: Joe Milner, Moll Anderson, Paula Mulcahy Keane), was the opening theme to RAI TV programmes and matches related to the 1990 FIFA World Cup.

The song achieved success on the charts of several European countries.

== Release ==
For the Italian release, Moroder addressed Gianna Nannini and Edoardo Bennato, who rewrote the lyrics and took the song to the top of the charts in Italy and Switzerland. From January to September 1990, the song was the best-selling single in Italy. The song was presented for the first time by the two singer-songwriters in Milan in December 1989, and performed live during the opening ceremony, held on 8 June 1990, in Milan, before the Argentina–Cameroon opening match, followed later also by the English version. It describes the desire to win, and score a goal.

The song was among the first to contain a single instrumental version (indicated as a karaoke version) and to be published as a maxi single.

== Cover versions ==
In 1990, Hong Kong singer Alan Tam covered this song in Cantonese under the title "Ideals and Peace" (Chinese: 理想與和平; Jyutping: Lei^{5}soeng^{2} jyu^{5} wo^{4}ping^{4}).

In 2014, The Italian Tenors covered this song.

== Track listings ==
7" single

1. "Un'estate italiana" – 4:07
2. "Un'estate italiana" (karaoke version) – 4:07

12" maxi

1. "Un'estate italiana" (stadium version) – 4:50
2. "Un'estate italiana" (7" version) – 4:07
3. "Un'estate italiana" (karaoke version) – 4:07

CD maxi

1. "Un'estate italiana" (stadium version) – 4:50
2. "Un'estate italiana" (single version) – 4:07
3. "Un'estate italiana" (karaoke version) – 4:07

== Charts ==
=== Weekly charts ===
Chart (1990)	Peak position
Austria (Ö3 Austria Top 40)	11
France (SNEP)	23
Germany (GfK)	2
Italy (FIMI)	1
Italy Airplay (Music & Media)	1
Norway (VG-lista)	4
Sweden (Sverigetopplistan)	7
Switzerland (Schweizer Hitparade)	1

Chart (2021)	Peak position
Italy (FIMI)	33

=== Year-end charts ===
Chart (1990)	Position
Austria (Ö3 Austria Top 40)	28
Europe (Eurochart Hot 100)	21
Switzerland (Schweizer Hitparade)	1

== Certifications ==
Region	Certification	Certified units/sales
Germany (BVMI)	Gold	250,000^{^}
Italy (FIMI)	Platinum	100,000^{‡}
Sweden (GLF)	Gold	25,000^{^}
^{^} Shipments figures based on certification alone.^{‡} Sales+streaming figures based on certification alone.

== See also ==
- List of FIFA World Cup songs and anthems
