= List of number-one hits of 1979 (Italy) =

This is a list of number-one songs in 1979 on the Italian charts compiled weekly by the Italian Hit Parade Singles Chart.

== Chart history ==
Issue date	Song	Artist(s)	Ref.
January 6	"Una donna per amico"	Lucio Battisti	
January 13	"Meteor Man"	D. D. Jackson	
January 20	"Too Much Heaven"	Bee Gees	
January 27	"Too Much Heaven"	Bee Gees	
February 3	"Too Much Heaven"	Bee Gees	
February 10	"Mi scappa la pipì, papà"	Pippo Franco	
February 17	"Mi scappa la pipì, papà"	Pippo Franco	
February 24	"Mi scappa la pipì, papà"	Pippo Franco	
March 3	"Mi scappa la pipì, papà"	Pippo Franco	
March 10	"Mi scappa la pipì, papà"	Pippo Franco	
March 17	"Born to Be Alive"	Patrick Hernandez	
March 24	"Tragedy"	Bee Gees	
March 31	"Tragedy"	Bee Gees	
April 7	"Tragedy"	Bee Gees	
April 14	"Tragedy"	Bee Gees	
April 21	"Tragedy"	Bee Gees	
April 28	"Tragedy"	Bee Gees	
May 5	"Tragedy"	Bee Gees	
May 12	"Il Carrozzone"	Renato Zero	
May 19	"Il Carrozzone"	Renato Zero	
May 26	"Il Carrozzone"	Renato Zero	
June 2	"Il Carrozzone"	Renato Zero	
June 9	"Knock on Wood"	Amii Stewart	
June 16	"Knock on Wood"	Amii Stewart	
June 23	"Tu Sei l'Unica Donna Per Me"	Alan Sorrenti	
June 30	"Tu Sei l'Unica Donna Per Me"	Alan Sorrenti	
July 7	"Tu Sei l'Unica Donna Per Me"	Alan Sorrenti	
July 14	"Tu Sei l'Unica Donna Per Me"	Alan Sorrenti	
July 21	"Tu Sei l'Unica Donna Per Me"	Alan Sorrenti	
July 28	"Tu Sei l'Unica Donna Per Me"	Alan Sorrenti	
August 4	"Tu Sei l'Unica Donna Per Me"	Alan Sorrenti	
August 11	"Tu Sei l'Unica Donna Per Me"	Alan Sorrenti	
August 18	"Tu Sei l'Unica Donna Per Me"	Alan Sorrenti	
August 25	"Tu Sei l'Unica Donna Per Me"	Alan Sorrenti	
September 1	"Tu Sei l'Unica Donna Per Me"	Alan Sorrenti	
September 8	"Tu Sei l'Unica Donna Per Me"	Alan Sorrenti	
September 15	"Tu Sei l'Unica Donna Per Me"	Alan Sorrenti	
September 22	"Tu Sei l'Unica Donna Per Me"	Alan Sorrenti	
September 29	"Soli"	Adriano Celentano	
October 6	"Soli"	Adriano Celentano	
October 13	"Soli"	Adriano Celentano	
October 20	"Soli"	Adriano Celentano	
October 27	"Se Tornassi"	Julio Iglesias	
November 3	"Se Tornassi"	Julio Iglesias	
November 10	"Se Tornassi"	Julio Iglesias	
November 17	"Remi, Le Sue Avventure"	Ragazzi Di Remi	
November 24	"Remi, Le Sue Avventure"	Ragazzi Di Remi	
December 1	"Remi, Le Sue Avventure"	Ragazzi Di Remi	
December 8	"Remi, Le Sue Avventure"	Ragazzi Di Remi	
December 15	"Remi, Le Sue Avventure"	Ragazzi Di Remi	
December 22	"Remi, Le Sue Avventure"	Ragazzi Di Remi	
December 29	"Remi, Le Sue Avventure"	Ragazzi Di Remi	

== Number-one artists ==
Position	Artist	Weeks #1
1	Alan Sorrenti	14
2	Bee Gees	10
3	Ragazzi Di Remi	7
4	Pippo Franco	5
5	Adriano Celentano	4
5	Renato Zero	4
6	Julio Iglesias	3
7	Amii Stewart	2
8	Dee D. Jackson	1
8	Lucio Battisti	1
8	Patrick Hernandez	1
