= Non son degno di te =

Single by Gianni Morandi

from the album Gianni 3
- B-side: "Per una notte no"
- Released: 1964
- Genre: Pop
- Length: 3:08
- Label: RCA Italiana
- Songwriters: Franco Migliacci; Bruno Zambrini
- Producer: Franco Migliacci

Gianni Morandi singles chronology
"In ginocchio da te" (1964)	"Non son degno di te" (1964)	"Se non avessi più te" (1965)

Audio
- "Non son degno di te" on YouTube

"Non son degno di te" (transl. I Am Not Worthy of You) is a 1964 Italian song composed by Franco Migliacci (lyrics) Luis Bacalov and Bruno Zambrini (music) and performed by Gianni Morandi.

== Background ==
The song is considered a follow-up of "In ginocchio da te", of which it reprises themes and musical structure. The song was launched from the victory at the 1964 Festival delle rose, and a few months later it won the tenth edition of Canzonissima.

Dalida covered the song in French as "Tu n'as pas mérité", with lyrics by Pierre Saka. The song was also covered in Portuguese by Agnaldo Rayol as "Não Mereço Você".

The song was adapted into a musicarello film with the same title, directed by Ettore Maria Fizzarotti and starring the same Morandi and his future wife Laura Efrikian.

== Track listing ==
No.	Title	Lyrics	Music	Length
1.	"Non son degno di te"	Franco Migliacci	Luis Bacalov, Bruno Zambrini	3:08
2.	"Per una notte no"	Migliacci	Armando Trovajoli	2:38

== Charts ==
=== Weekly charts ===
Chart (1964–1965)	Peak position
Italy (Musica e dischi)	1
Spain (AFYVE)	1
