= Edoardo Bennato =

Italian singer-songwriter

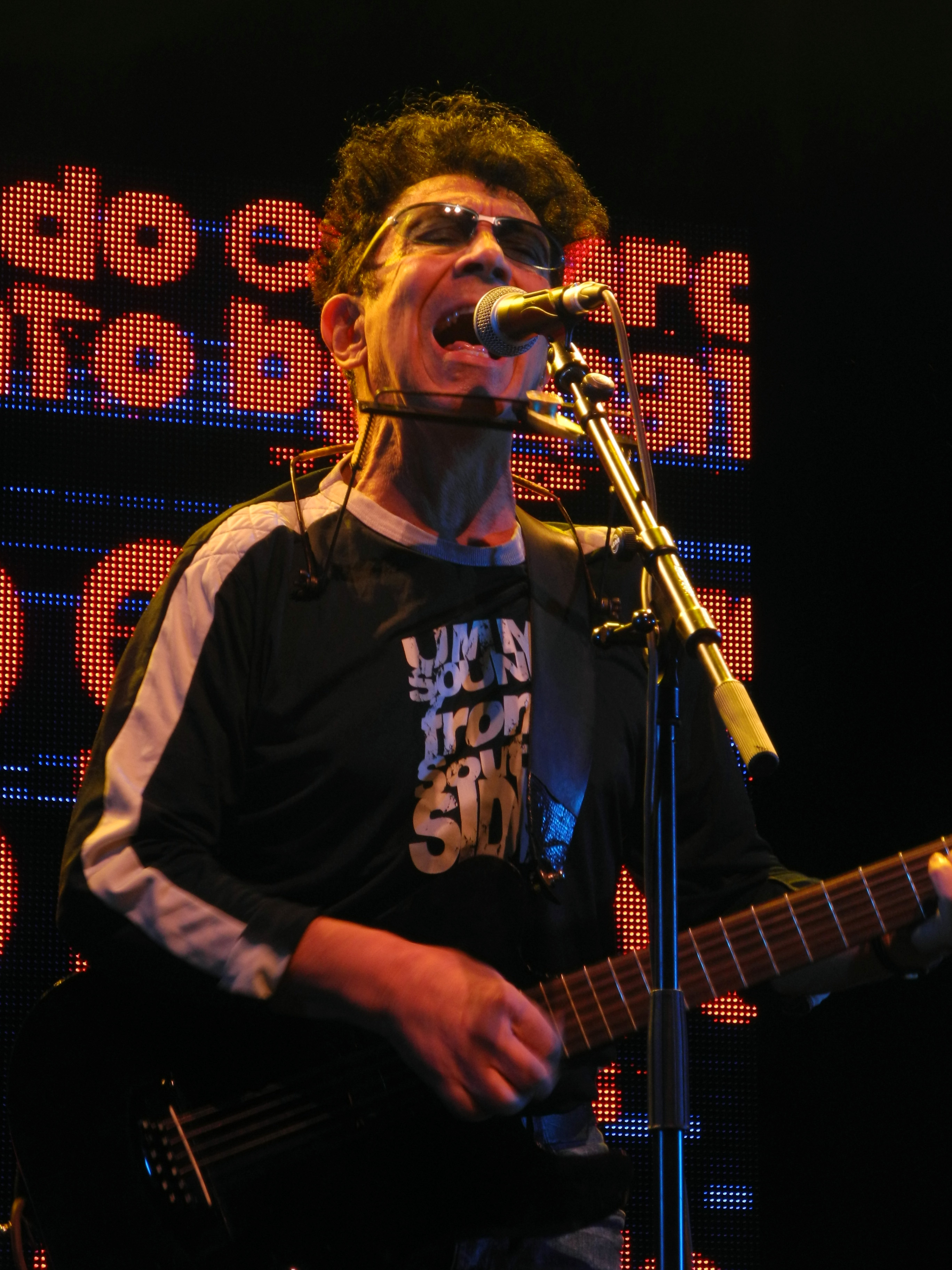
- Bennato in concert in 2016

Background information
- Born: Edoardo Bennato; 23 July 1946 (age 80); Naples, Italy
- Genres: Rock; blues rock; rock and roll; folk rock; pop rock; folk
- Occupation: Singer-songwriter
- Instruments: Vocals; electric guitar; steel-string acoustic guitar; twelve-string guitar; harmonica; kazoo; whistling; pedal-tambourine
- Labels: Parade; Ri-Fi; Numero Uno; Ricordi; Cheyenne; Five; RTI Music
- Website: www.bennato.net

Edoardo Bennato (born 23 July 1946) is an Italian singer-songwriter. He is the brother of the singer-songwriter Eugenio Bennato.

He is considered one of the greatest artists in Italian rock, a genre that he has often combined with blues and folk. Guitarist, harmonica player and singer, he later began to propose himself as one-man band, playing at the same time also tambourines, kazoo and other percussions. His texts are often ironic, irreverent, and turned in a biting way against power, at any level and in any form it manifests.

He was the first Italian singer to fill the San Siro Stadium in Milan with more than sixty thousand people on 19 July 1980, and the first Italian singer to perform at the Montreux Jazz Festival in 1976. Also, Bennato was the first singer to have released two albums only 15 days apart in March 1980: Uffà! Uffà! and Sono solo canzonette.

== Biography ==
Edoardo Bennato began his music career in the early sixties (the first single was published on 1966) as one of the most creative and innovative songwriters of his time. His music distinguished itself for being an imaginative blend of blues, rock and roll, folk influences and even hints of opera. He has been described as "a cross between Bob Dylan and Lucio Battisti".

After his first album Non farti cadere le braccia ("Don't let your arms fall", 1973), where he was still finding his way between tradition and innovation, Bennato decidedly chose the latter, many of his songs being performed by himself as a one-man band, with a 12-string acoustic guitar, harmonica, kazoo and foot-drum.

During this early period, Bennato's lyrics were characterised by biting satire and irony, often addressed at the establishment and those self-proclaimed as "the good". His second album, I buoni e i cattivi ("The good and the bad ones", 1974), was an attack against the common-sense distinction between good and evil, between the righteous and the villains. "Arrivano i buoni" ("Here come the good ones") was particularly significant: "Here come the good ones, they are resolute and they've already made a list of all the bad guys to eliminate... so now the good have declared war against the bad but they guarantee that it will be the last war ever to be fought...". With Io che non sono l'imperatore ("I, who am not the Emperor", 1975) Bennato pushed his music more towards experimentation, still mainly playing his acoustic guitar. The cover of the album shows a plan for the Naples light-rail system that Bennato had developed for his final project as a university student. While it was highly praised by his lecturers, the plan was never approved by the city council, giving him even more reason to deride and mock the powers to be.

"Meno male che adesso non c'è Nerone" ("Fortunately there's no Nero now") and "Signor censore" ("Mister censor") are among Bennato's best examples of pungent criticism of the system. With La Torre di Babele ("The Tower of Babel", 1976) Bennato's music became more sophisticated – more musicians contributed to the album, which contains tracks of a very wide range of styles. Bennato was clearly evolving rapidly and this album reflects this process. "Cantautore" ("Songwriter") is an amusing piece mocking those songwriters who, at the time, were taking themselves too seriously.

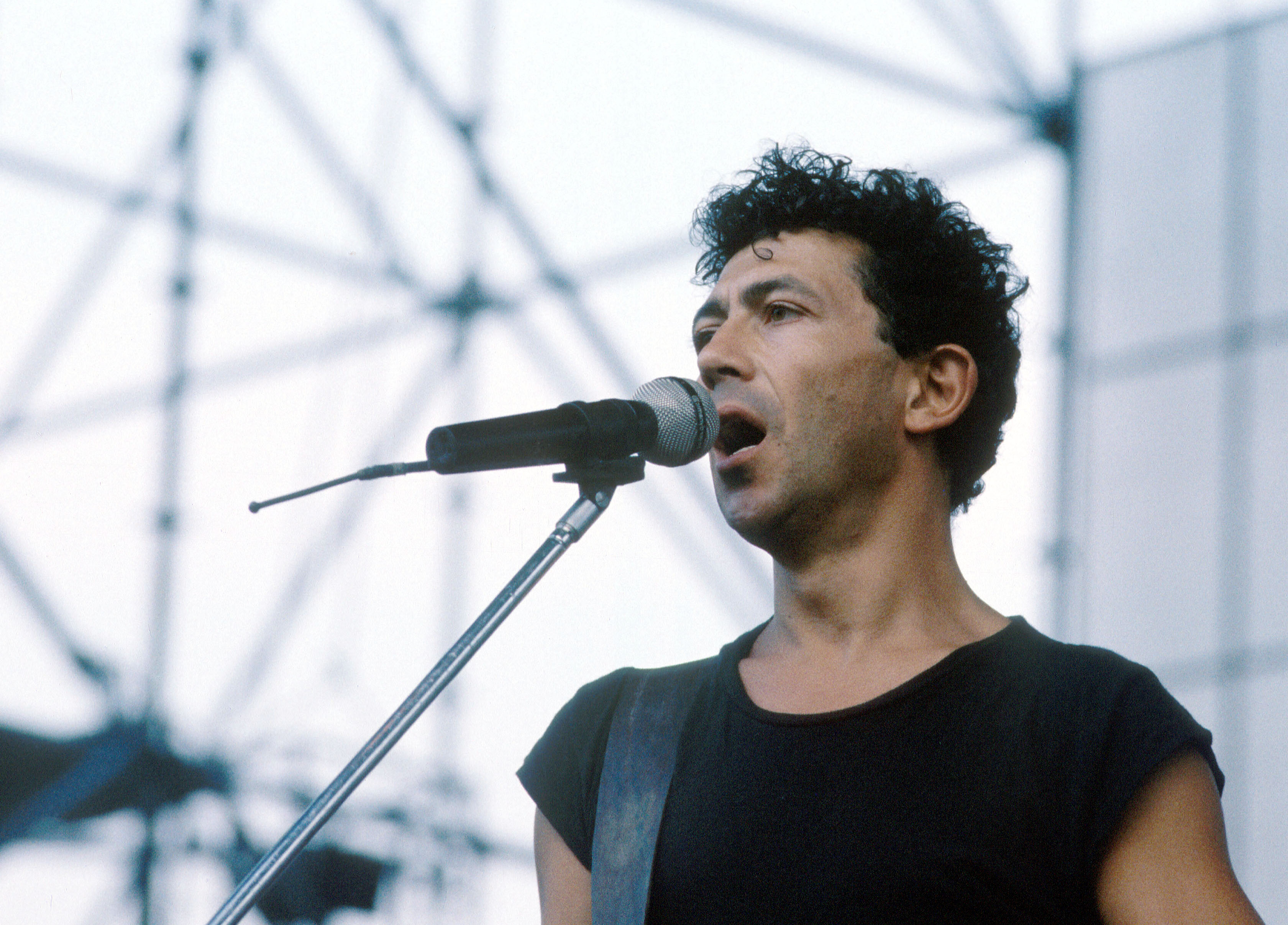
Bennato in Venice, 1982

In the following year, Bennato finally reached commercial success with Burattino senza fili ("Marionette without strings", 1977). This is a concept album based on the Pinocchio fairy tale. The central idea is that having one's own freedom and independence is always better than giving in to the system and its rules, even if it means renouncing to some advantages that the system itself uses as luring temptations. Most of the songs in the album became classics, not only of Bennato's repertoire, but also of Italian pop music in general, "Il gatto e la volpe" ("The cat and the fox") probably being the most famous one.

In 1980, Bennato released two albums in less than a month: Uffa! Uffa! ("I'm fed up!", 1980) and Sono solo canzonette ("They're only pop songs", 1980). The two albums together sold more than a million copies. Uffa! Uffa!, the more experimental of the two records, features an eclectic mix of genres from medieval ecclesiastical chants to punk rock. The album produced popular hits but was generally overshadowed by the hugely successful Sono solo canzonette, a concept album based on the Peter Pan fairy tale and affirming the value of fantasy and imagination over reason and logic.

By this time, Bennato was the most popular Italian songwriter. Inevitably, this period also coincided with the start of a very slow but perceptible decline. In 1983 another fairy-tale concept album, based on The Pied Piper of Hamelin appeared on the market (È arrivato un bastimento) but it wasn't as successful as the previous ones and this must have led Bennato to try different avenues. This he did with alternating fortune until the present day. Notably, on the occasion of the 1990 FIFA World Cup, which was held in Italy, Edoardo sang the official song of the event: "Un'estate italiana" ("An Italian Summer") together with Gianna Nannini.

== Discography ==
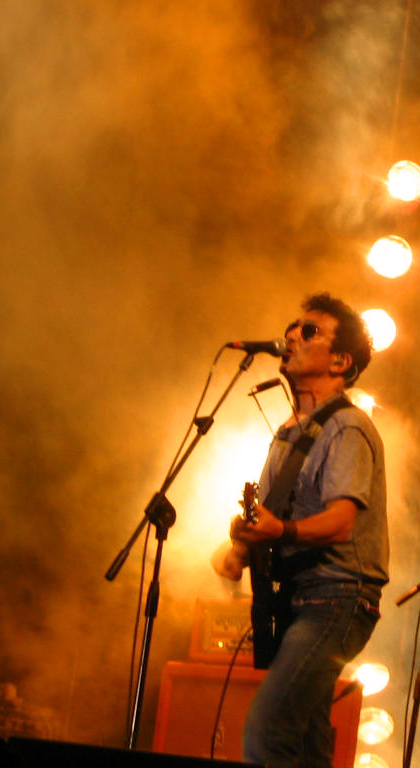
Bennato in 2007

- Non farti cadere le braccia (1973)
- I buoni e i cattivi (1974)
- Io che non-sono l'imperatore (1975)
- La torre di Babele (1976)
- Burattino senza fili (1977)
- Uffà! Uffà! (1980)
- Sono solo canzonette (1980)
- È arrivato un bastimento (1983)
- È goal! (Edoardo Bennato live) (1984)
- Kaiwanna (1985)
- OK Italia (1987)
- Edoardo live (1987)
- Il gioco continua (mini LP) (1988)
- Abbi dubbi (1989)
- Edo rinnegato (1990)
- Capitan Uncino (1992)
- Il paese dei balocchi (1992)
- È asciuto pazzo 'o padrone (1992)
- Se son rose fioriranno (1994)
- Le ragazze fanno grandi sogni (1995)
- All the best (1996)
- Quartetto d'archi (1996)
- Sbandato (1998)
- Gli anni settanta (2 cd) (1998)
- Sembra ieri (2000)
- Afferrare una stella (2001)
- Il principe e il pirata (2001)
- L'uomo occidentale (2003)
- Totò Sapore e la magica storia della pizza (2003)
- La fantastica storia del Pifferaio Magico (2005)
- Canzoni tour 2007 (2007)
- Canzoni tour 2008 (2008)
- Le vie del rock sono infinite (2010)
- Pronti a salpare (2015)
- Burattino senza fili 2017 (2017)
- Live Anthology (2018)
- Non c'è (2020)
