= Musica e dischi =

Italian music publication

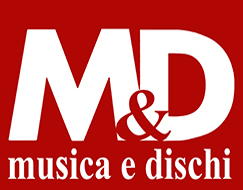
- Frequency: Monthly
- Founder: Aldo Mario De Luigi
- First issue: October 1945
- Final issue: June 2014
- Country: Italy
- Based in: Milan
- Language: Italian
- Website: www.musicaedischi.it
- ISSN: 0027-4526
- OCLC: 9955628

Musica e dischi (English: "Music and Records") was the oldest and longest-running music industry publication in Italy.

In 1961, Billboard defined the publication as the "Italian record bible".

== History ==
It was founded in October 1945 in Milan, Italy, on the initiative of the journalist and musicologist Aldo Mario De Luigi, a former record executive at La Voce Del Padrone-Columbia-Marconiphone (VCM, now EMI Italy). Originally, the magazine was published under the name Musica (Dischi was added on the second edition) on a monthly basis.

In the 1960s, Musica e dischi started to issue a list of best-seller music recordings nationally. After the death of Aldo Mario in 1968, his son Mario De Luigi, already reviewer and editor of the magazine since 1958, became the director.

In 1999, the official website was opened. On its 735th issue in December 2009, Musica e dischi director Mario De Luigi announced that from March 2010 they would publish an online magazine and stop the publication of the physical magazine after 65 years.

In June 2014, the magazine ceased to exist after almost 70 years and 783 issues (737 in physical and 46 in digital format).

== See also ==
- Federation of the Italian Music Industry
- List of number-one hits (Italy)
