= A mano a mano =

Single by Riccardo Cocciante

from the album Riccardo Cocciante
- B-side: "Storie"
- Released: 1978
- Length: 4:14
- Label: RCA Italiana
- Songwriter(s): Riccardo Cocciante; Marco Luberti

Riccardo Cocciante singles chronology
| "Margherita" (1976) | "A mano a mano" (1978) | "Io canto" (1979) |

Music video
- "A mano a mano" on YouTube

"A mano a mano" ('Little by little') is a 1978 Italian song by Riccardo Cocciante. It achieved major success in its 1980 version by Rino Gaetano.

== Overview ==
The leading single of the 1978 album Riccardo Cocciante, the song was composed by Cocciante (music) and Marco Luberti (lyrics). The original version of the song has been described as a slow waltz rich in Frédéric Chopin 's influences and citations.

During a 1980 tour held by Cocciante, Rino Gaetano and New Perigeo, the two artists swapped two of their hits, with Cocciante performing Gaetano's "Aida" and Gaetano's adapting Cocciante's "A mano a mano". Gaetano's version, later released in the EP Q-Concert, significantly modified the arrangement and the timing of the song, turning it in a composition closer to a mixture between a polka and a Traffic's song. Furthermore, Gaetano's vocal performance was more energetic, rougher and less dramatic than Cocciante's, with his performance being described as a mix between Luca Carboni and Zucchero Fornaciari. During the years, the song became mainly associated to Gaetano, even thanks to Ferzan Özpetek, who chose Gaetano's version as theme of his 2014 film Fasten Your Seatbelts.

Artists who recorded the song include Andrea Bocelli, Emma Marrone, Spagna, Alessio Bernabei, Tosca, Piero Barone, Mannarino.

== Track listing ==
| No. | Title | Writer(s) | Length |
|---|---|---|---|
| 1. | "A mano a mano" | Cocciante, Luberti | 4:14 |
| 2. | "Storie" | Cocciante, Luberti | 4:59 |

== Charts ==
Riccardo Cocciante version

| Chart (1978) | Peak position |
|---|---|
| Italy (Musica e dischi) | 7 |

Rino Gaetano version

| Chart (2014-6) | Peak position |
|---|---|
| Italy (Musica e dischi) | 27 |

Alessio Bernabei version

| Chart (2016) | Peak position |
|---|---|
| Italy (Musica e dischi) | 45 |

== Certifications ==
Rino Gaetano version

| Region | Certification | Certified units/sales |
|---|---|---|
| Italy (FIMI) Sales since 2009 | 4× Platinum | 400,000^{‡} |
^{‡} Sales+streaming figures based on certification alone.
