= Sanremo Music Festival 1979 =

Italian song contest (29th edition)

Dates and venue
- First night: 11 January 1979
- Second night: 12 January 1979
- Final night: 13 January 1979
- Venue: Teatro Ariston; Sanremo, Italy

Organisation
- Organiser: Gianni Ravera

Production
- Broadcaster: Radiotelevisione italiana (RAI)
- Director: Antonio Moretti
- Presenters: Mike Bongiorno and Anna Maria Rizzoli

Vote
- Number of entries: 22
- Winner: "Amare"; Mino Vergnaghi

The Sanremo Music Festival 1979 (Italian: Festival di Sanremo 1979), officially the 29th Italian Song Festival (29º Festival della canzone italiana), was the 29th annual Sanremo Music Festival, held at the Teatro Ariston in Sanremo between 11 and 13 January 1979. It was organised by Gianni Ravera under sponsorship from the municipality of Sanremo and broadcast by Radiotelevisione italiana (RAI). The shows were presented by Mike Bongiorno, assisted by the actress Anna Maria Rizzoli.

The winning song was "Amare" written by Sergio Ortone and Piero Finà, and performed by Mino Vergnaghi.

== Format ==
In 1978, the municipality of Sanremo invited several companies to submit proposals to organise the festival's 1979 edition. During a meeting in August 1978, the Sanremo municipal council decided unanimously to entrust the event's organisation to Gianni Ravera under his television production company Publispei, after he had last organised the event in 1974, over proposals from Vittorio Salvetti and Angelo Piccarreta. Ravera's proposal was chosen by the council for its economic benefits in addition to its support from unions. The proposal included opening up submissions for the competition to independent songwriters and inviting established artists to perform their new songs as guests.

The second week of January was selected for the festival's dates, with the three shows chosen to be held between 11 and 13 January 1979. The choice was made to coincide with the peak of Sanremo's holiday tourism season, as well as to allow for the festival's competing songs to be presented at the Midem trade show in Cannes on 20 January.

The Teatro Ariston was chosen as the festival's venue for the third year in a row, as renovations in the festival's traditional venue, the ballroom of the Sanremo Casino, remained incomplete. Ravera commissioned four different set designers to develop proposals for the festival's set design. A design by Gian Francesco Ramacci was chosen, which featured around two thousand and six hundred lightbulbs and a retractable projector screen. For the final night, the screen was used to project slides of locations in Sanremo to advertise tourism in the city to international audiences.

Ravera stated that among his goals in organising the festival were relaunching Italian music abroad through generating interest in the event and formatting the edition like successful past editions. Features of previous editions that were reimplemented included eliminating songs during the first two nights, requiring artists to sing live and employing a large orchestra to accompany the artists.

=== Voting ===
The voting across the three shows was conducted by fifty juries, divided into five sets of ten juries stationed in as many locations across Italy and meant to be representative of the Italian public. Locations included hotels, military institutions and nightclubs, and each jury contained ten members. Additionally, two reserve juries were stationed in Sanremo in case any of the other juries were unable to be contacted.

Ten juries in both the first and second nights were responsible for deciding the six finalists from each show, with jury members listening to the eleven competing songs via audio during the first part of the shows and voting for six songs after the performances concluded. The six songs that received the most points were selected for the final and performed again during the second part of the shows, in which another ten juries voted, with jury members watching the performances via television and giving each song a score ranging from 1 to 10. The vote results were kept secret until the final night, in which they were added together with the results of another ten juries who cast their votes during the show, also giving each song a score ranging from 1 to 10. The song that received the most points across both votes was proclaimed the winner.

== Competing entries ==
Submissions for the competition were open to both independent songwriters and record companies. Interested songwriters were able to submit one of their songs to the festival's organisers by 30 November 1978, as long as they had Italian citizenship, and their song was unreleased and written in a language native to Italy. After the close of the deadline, the organisers received over 800 song submissions: 126 submitted by record companies and over 700 submitted by independent songwriters. A five-member special commission, consisting of the musician Virgilio Bracani, the disc jockey Cesare Frantuelli and the critics David Grieco, Marcello Fratoni and Gaetano Tropea, were tasked with selecting a total of twenty songs for the competition, including two submitted by independent songwriters. On 16 December, the commission selected twenty-two songs to compete, with twenty songs selected from record companies and two songs, "Liana" and "Napule cagnarrà", selected from independent songwriters.

Competing entries
Song	Artist	Songwriter(s)	Conductor
"Nocciolino"	Antoine	Maurizio Piccoli	Jean-Daniel Mercier
"Ayx Disco"	Ayx	Riccardo Galardini	Vince Tempera
"Ciao Barbarella"	Ciro Sebastianelli	Ciro Sebastianelli; Daniele Pace; Oscar Avogadro	Gianni Mazza
"La gente parla"	Collage	Sandro Di Nardo; Marcello Marrocchi; Antonello De Sanctis	Marcello Faneschi
"Sarà un fiore"	Enrico Beruschi	Corrado Conti; Mario Panzeri; Daniele Pace	Jean-Daniel Mercier
"Barbara"	Enzo Carella	Enzo Carella; Pasquale Panella	Gianni Mazza
"A me mi piace vivere alla grande"	Franco Fanigliulo	Riccardo Borghetti; Franco Fanigliulo; Daniele Pace; Oscar Avogadro	Gianni Mazza
"Talismano nero"	Gianni Mocchetti	Gianni Mocchetti; Manipoli	Pinuccio Pirazzoli
"Liana"	Grimm	Loreno Lazzarini	Gianni Dall'Aglio
"Quell'attimo in più"	I Camaleonti	Mario Lavezzi; Daniele Pace; Oscar Avogadro	Pinuccio Pirazzoli
"Impazzirò"	Il était une fois	Pietro Civello; Basilivan	Vince Tempera
"C'era un'atmosfera"	Kim & The Cadillacs	Piero Cassano; Salvatore Stellita	Giancarlo Trombetti
"New York"	Lorella Pescerelli	Flavio Paulin; Franco Migliacci	Amedeo Tommasi
"Autunno, cadono le pagine gialle"	Marinella	Roberto Ferri; Giancarlo Trombetti	Giancarlo Trombetti
"Napule cagnarrà"	Massimo Abbate	Wanda Montanelli	Gianni Mazza
"In due"	Michele Vicino	Michele Vicino; Giovanni Belfiore	Rodolfo Grieco
"Amare"	Mino Vergnaghi	Sergio Ortone; Piero Finà	Piero Soffici
"Grande mago"	Nicoletta Bauce	Nicoletta Bauce	Claudio Pascoli
"Il diario dei segreti"	Opera	Giuseppe Adorno; Daiano	Pinuccio Pirazzoli
"Tu fai schifo sempre"	Pandemonium	Angelo Giordano; Michele Paulicelli; Gianni Mauro	Gianni Mazza
"Il sole, la pioggia"	Roberta	Corrado Conti; Daniele Pace	Antonello Vannucchi
"Bimba mia"	Umberto Napolitano	Umberto Napolitano	Alberto Nicorelli

== Shows ==
The festival consisted of three shows held between 11 and 13 January 1979. The shows were presented by Mike Bongiorno, who served in the role for the tenth time, assisted by the actress Anna Maria Rizzoli. An orchestra of around thirty musicians and the vocal group 5 + 3 di Paola Orlandi were present on stage to accompany the competing artists, while guest artists performed their songs using playback. The shows were directed by Antonio Moretti. The song "La felicità" written by Franco Migliacci and Alberto Cheli, recorded by the group Schola Cantorum, served as the festival's theme song.

A gala featuring performances by artists from various countries with the title Galà delle Nazioni took place at the Teatro Ariston on 14 January, serving as a collateral event to the festival, and was held for the second year in a row. It was presented by Anna Maria Rizzoli and included performances from the artists Al Jarreau, Demis Roussos, Tina Turner, Kate Bush, Boney M., Sarah Brightman and Hot Gossip, Matia Bazar, New Trolls, Chic, Patty Pravo, Bob McGilpin, Clay C. and Edwin Starr. The event was recorded by RAI to be broadcast as a series of television specials aired at a later date.

=== First night ===
The first night was held on 11 January 1979. Eleven artists performed their songs during the first part of the show, with six selected for the final and performed again during the second part.

Qualifier

First night – 11 January 1979
R/O	Song	Artist	Result
1	"Barbara"	Enzo Carella	Qualified
2	"Il diario dei segreti"	Opera	—N/a
3	"Talismano nero"	Gianni Mocchetti	—N/a
4	"Ayx Disco"	Ayx	—N/a
5	"Nocciolino"	Antoine	Qualified
6	"Amare"	Mino Vergnaghi	Qualified
7	"Liana"	Grimm	Qualified
8	"C'era un'atmosfera"	Kim & The Cadillacs	Qualified
9	"Ciao Barbarella"	Ciro Sebastianelli	—N/a
10	"Il sole, la pioggia"	Roberta	—N/a
11	"New York"	Lorella Pescerelli	Qualified

=== Second night ===
The second night was held on 12 January 1979. Eleven artists performed their songs during the first part of the show, with six selected for the final and performed again during the second part.

Qualifier

Second night – 12 January 1979
R/O	Song	Artist	Result
1	"Impazzirò"	Il était une fois	—N/a
2	"Bimba mia"	Umberto Napolitano	Qualified
3	"Tu fai schifo sempre"	Pandemonium	Qualified
4	"Quell'attimo in più"	I Camaleonti	Qualified
5	"A me mi piace vivere alla grande"	Franco Fanigliulo	Qualified
6	"In due"	Michele Vicino	—N/a
7	"Napule cagnarrà"	Massimo Abbate	—N/a
8	"La gente parla"	Collage	Qualified
9	"Autunno, cadono le pagine gialle"	Marinella	—N/a
10	"Sarà un fiore"	Enrico Beruschi	Qualified
11	"Grande mago"	Nicoletta Bauce	—N/a

=== Final night ===
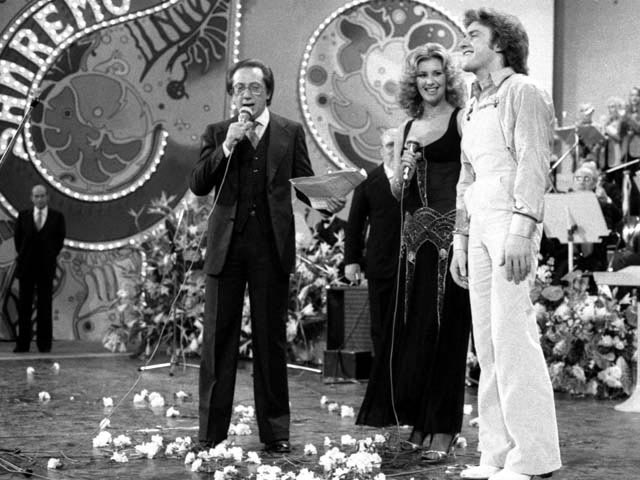
Presenters Mike Bongiorno and Anna Maria Rizzoli with the winner Mino Vergnaghi (right)

The final night was held on 13 January 1979. The twelve finalists performed their songs again and a winner was chosen from a combination of votes awarded by juries throughout the night and during the previous two nights.

Guest appearances during the show included Pippo Franco performing his song "Mi scappa la pipì, papà", Iva Zanicchi performing her songs "Pronto 113" and "Per te", Gigi Proietti performing his songs "Me viè da piagne" and "Notte de senza luna", Demis Roussos performing his songs "Il mago" and "Dolce veleno", Riccardo Cocciante performing his songs "Io canto" and "Carnevale", Kate Bush performing her song "Hammer Horror" and Tina Turner performing her song "Root, Toot Undisputable Rock 'n Roller". At the end of the show, the group Schola Cantorum performed the festival's theme song, "La felicità".

The winning song was "Amare" performed by Mino Vergnaghi, written by Sergio Ortone and Piero Finà. In second place was "Barbara" performed by Enzo Carella, written by Carella and Pasquale Panella, and in third place was "Quell'attimo in più" performed by the group I Camaleonti, written by Mario Lavezzi, Daniele Pace and Oscar Avogadro. The top three songs were reprised at the end of the show.

Winner

Final night – 13 January 1979
R/O	Song	Artist	Night 1 and 2	Final	Total	Place
1	"Amare"	Mino Vergnaghi	701	740	1,441	1
2	"Nocciolino"	Antoine	449	508	957	11
3	"Tu fai schifo sempre"	Pandemonium	490	503	993	10
4	"C'era un'atmosfera"	Kim & The Cadillacs	570	484	1,054	8
5	"Liana"	Grimm	448	406	854	12
6	"Bimba mia"	Umberto Napolitano	494	550	1,044	9
7	"Barbara"	Enzo Carella	702	555	1,257	2
8	"La gente parla"	Collage	653	557	1,210	4
9	"A me mi piace vivere alla grande"	Franco Fanigliulo	620	536	1,156	6
10	"Sarà un fiore"	Enrico Beruschi	647	549	1,196	5
11	"Quell'attimo in più"	I Camaleonti	619	637	1,256	3
12	"New York"	Lorella Pescerelli	590	559	1,149	7

== Broadcasts ==
=== Local broadcast ===
The first two nights were divided into two parts, with the first parts broadcast only on Rai Radio 2 beginning at 21:00 CET, while the second parts were broadcast on both Rai Radio 2 and Rete Uno, beginning at 22:45 CET during the first night and 23:10 CET during the second night. The final was broadcast in full on Rai Radio 2 and Rete Uno beginning at 20:40 CET.

The final was broadcast on television in Italy to an estimated 22.3 million viewers, while the first and second nights were broadcast to an estimated 3.8 and 3.1 million television viewers respectively.

=== International broadcast ===
The final was broadcast abroad via the Eurovision network. It was reportedly aired live by broadcasters in Luxembourg, Yugoslavia, Greece, Portugal, Algeria, East Germany, Hungary, Bulgaria, the Soviet Union, Poland, Romania and Czechoslovakia, and deferred by broadcasters in Spain, Canada, Germany, France, Sweden, Australia and throughout South America. Known details on the broadcasts in each country, including the specific broadcasting stations and commentators are shown in the tables below.

International broadcasters of the Sanremo Music Festival 1979
Country	Broadcaster	Channel(s)	Commentator(s)	Ref(s)
Chile	UCTV	Canal 13 (Note: Delayed broadcast on 26 January at 21:30 (CLST))		
Czechoslovakia	ČST	ČST1 (Note: Delayed broadcast on 12 May at 23:30 (CEST))		
Luxembourg	CLT	RTL Télé-Luxembourg (Note: Delayed broadcast on 5 February at 21:00 (CET))		
