= The Next Three Days (soundtrack) =

The Next Three Days (Music from the Motion Picture)

Film score by Danny Elfman
- Released: November 9, 2010
- Recorded: 2010
- Studio: AIR Studios, London
- Genre: Film score
- Length: 71:27
- Label: Lionsgate Records
- Producer: Danny Elfman

Danny Elfman chronology
Alice in Wonderland (2010)	The Next Three Days (2010)	Restless (2011)

The Next Three Days (Music from the Motion Picture) is the film score to the 2010 film The Next Three Days directed by Paul Haggis and starring Russell Crowe and Elizabeth Banks. The film score is composed by Danny Elfman and released through Lionsgate Records on November 9, 2010.

== Background ==
Danny Elfman composed the film score for The Next Three Days. Unlike his previous films, which had broad and large orchestral themes for major pictures, Elfman developed a quiet, intense and internalized score that supported the characters' inner turmoil and developed more subtle themes for building tension. He noted that the score had a personality of being subtle and tense, and felt Haggis' process to be wonderful on emphasizing understated sparseness to build tension. Singer-songwriter Moby wrote and performed two songs for the film.

== Reception ==
Christian Clemmensen of Filmtracks wrote "it's a pleasant enough diversion to recommend to those who prefer lightly rhythmic, non-offensive suspense music with a tender temperament." Daniel Schweiger of AssignmentX wrote "Elfman’s inimitably eccentric style has perhaps never sounded so effectively normal as it were, combining an emotional heartbeat with gripping suspense rhythms, as tender guitars, pianos and melodically tense strings reflect the love and determination that turns an ordinary husband into a fugitive." William Ruhlmann of AllMusic wrote "the music suggests more of a psychological thriller in which things may not be what they seem than a heart-pounding action picture."

Todd McCarthy of The Hollywood Reporter called it "an uncharacteristically conventional score by Danny Elfman". Justin Chang of Variety wrote "Danny Elfman’s score dutifully channels the propulsive rhythms of Bernard Herrmann before veering into moody electronica in the downright hysterical closing stretch." Glen Chapman of Den of Geek wrote "Elfman’s score here is solid, rather than outstanding." A. O. Scott of The New York Times noticed the score to be tense and overwhelmed.

== Track listing ==
No.	Title	Length
1.	"Prologue"	1:38
2.	"A Way In"	3:36
3.	"What She's Lost"	0:58
4.	"Pittsburgh's Tough"	2:02
5.	"Blood Stain"	1:32
6.	"Same Old Trick"	1:45
7.	"Don Quixote"	1:30
8.	"All Is Lost"	3:10
9.	"A Promise"	2:58
10.	"That's Ok"	1:53
11.	"It's On"	4:32
12.	"The Evidence"	1:24
13.	"Last Three Months"	3:29
14.	"The Bump Key"	2:30
15.	"A Warning"	2:22
16.	"Breakout"	8:20
17.	"Touch"	0:57
18.	"Reunion"	3:08
19.	"The Switch"	2:42
20.	"They're Off"	4:56
21.	"Got 'Em"	2:19
22.	"The Truth"	5:25
23.	"The Aftermath"	1:06
24.	"Mistake" (Moby)	3:46
25.	"Be The One" (Moby)	3:29
Total length:		71:27

== Personnel ==
Credits adapted from liner notes:

- Music composer and producer – Danny Elfman
- Arrangements and piano – TJ Lindgren
- Vocals – Ayana Haviv
- Conductor – Rick Wentworth
- Orchestrators – David Slonaker, Edgardo Simone, Steve Bartek
- Orchestra contractor – Isobel Griffiths
- Assistant orchestra contractor – Jo Buckley
- Orchestra leader – Thomas Bowes
- Technical score engineer – Greg Maloney
- MIDI supervision and preparation – Marc Mann
- Pre-recording – Noah Snyder
- Recording – Peter Cobbin
- Recording assistance – Chris Barrett
- Mixing – Dennis S. Sands
- Mixing assistance – Adam Olmsted
- Mastering – Patricia Sullivan
- Score editor – Bill Abbott
- Copyist – Dakota Music Services, Melisa McGregor
- Design – Amy Texter
- Technical assistance – Melisa McGregor
- Music clearances for Lionsgate – MCL Music Services, Matt Lille)y
- General manager and executive vice president of business affairs for Lionsgate – Lenny Wohl
- Head of film music for Lionsgate – Tracy McKnight
- Soundtracks and music marketing for Lionsgate – Jason Cienkus
