= Cervo a primavera =

Single by Riccardo Cocciante

from the album Cervo a primavera
- B-side: "Il sufflé con le banane"
- Released: 1980
- Length: 4:10
- Label: RCA Italiana
- Songwriter(s): Riccardo Cocciante; Mogol

Riccardo Cocciante singles chronology
"Io canto" (1979)	"Cervo a primavera" (1980)	"Tu sei il mio amico carissimo" (1980)

Audio
- "Cervo a primavera" on YouTube

"Cervo a primavera" ('Deer in the spring') is a 1980 Italian song by Riccardo Cocciante (music) and Mogol (lyrics) and performed by Riccardo Cocciante.

== Overview ==
The leading single of the 1980 eponymous album Cervo a primavera, the song marked the beginning of the long professional association of Cocciante, who was coming off a long collaboration with Marco Luberti, and Mogol, who had just interrupted a successful partnership with Lucio Battisti. The lyrics are a hymn to the springtime meant as a season of rebirth and change and represent a sort of manifesto of the two authors' artistic status at the time. The song has been described as "a full-fledged kraut-pop [...], a hymn to reincarnation in the secular sense of the term". It has often been used as opening song during Cocciante's tours.

Cocciante recorded the song in Spanish as "Yo Renacerè". Artists who covered the song include Marco Borsato and José Luis Rodríguez.

== Track listing ==
No.	Title	Writer(s)	Length
1.	"Cervo a primavera"	Cocciante, Mogol	4:10
2.	"Il sufflé con le banane"	Cocciante, Mogol	3:18

== Charts ==
Chart (1980)	Peak position
Italy (Musica e dischi)	4
