= Voorbij =

Voorbij (Dutch for 'Over, Past, Gone', pronounced [voːrˈbɛi]) may refer to:

- Atie Voorbij (1940–2024), Dutch swimmer
- Voorbij, voorbij, a 1981 television film by Paul Verhoeven
- "Voorbij" (song), a 1994 song by Paul de Leeuw

== See also ==
- "Vorbei", a 2004 song by Christina Stürmer
