= Scarlett Von Wollenmann =

- Born: February 27, 1962 (age 64); Lucerne, Switzerland
- Genres: Dance Pop
- Occupations: Singer; songwriter
- Years active: 1980–1995

Scarlett Von Wollenmann (born February 27, 1962), known professionally as Scarlett, is a British singer-songwriter.

She represents a highly unusual case in the international music scene—particularly during the 1980s and 1990s. At a time when many Italian artists aspired to break into the British market, Scarlett took the opposite path: defying the prevailing trend, she chose to pursue her career in Italy, where she achieved success performing in Italian.

== Biography ==
Scarlett Von Wollenmann was born in Lucerne to a British mother, writer and journalist, and a Swiss father, diplomat. She began singing and playing music at the age of 14, performing in venues across London. She made her recording debut in 1980 with the single "Ventilation", released by RCA. In 1982, she recorded the track "Wild Obsessions" for Jet Records, followed by the release of Sad Songs on the Radio in 1984 under the Lamborghini Records label.

Over the next two years, she contributed as a backing vocalist to albums by Living in a Box, Kissing the Pink, Sal Paradise, and Boy George.

As a songwriter, she collaborated with drummer Martin "Red" Broad of Sector 27 on the lyrics for "Living in the Underworld", as well as other songs that remained unreleased. She also wrote for various European and American artists, including "Listen to Your Heart" for Danish singer Gry and "Innocent Girl" for Ana Mia Rodriguez, a Cuban-born American singer.

=== Success in Italy ===
During the 1980s, Scarlett collaborated with several prominent pop musicians. She arrived in Italy in 1986 with the latter group, where she met Italian pop singer Scialpi. In 1988, she performed a duet with him on the single "Pregherei" (originally titled Let a Day, written by Scarlett and later translated into Italian), which went on to win the Festivalbar competition.

She began working as a songwriter alongside Giulio Rapetti Mogol and Franco Migliacci and joined concert tours that led her to perform with artists such as Gianni Morandi and Riccardo Cocciante. In 1994, she duetted with Cocciante on the song "Io Vivo Per Te", included on his album Un uomo felice.

Scarlett also found success in the dance music scene, both as a songwriter and performer, lending her voice to various projects: "Heroes" (1991) with Billy Preston, "The Galaxy of Love" with Dance or Die, "In Spirit" with Dilemma, and "Radar System" with Moratto.

In 1991, she co-wrote the songs "This Love of Mine" and "Cin Cin" with Pino Donaggio, Vito Pallavicini, and Bruno Ventura; both tracks were included in the soundtrack of the film A Fine Romance by Gene Saks, starring Marcello Mastroianni and Julie Andrews. In 1992, she returned to the Festivalbar with the song "Coprimi", which she also wrote. This was followed by artistic collaborations with Mietta, for whom she penned the lyrics of the song "Cambia Pelle", featured on the album of the same name.

=== Injury and career interruption ===
Scarlett's artistic career came to an abrupt halt in November 1995 following a car accident that left her with severe physical injuries, resulting in the need for a wheelchair. She was hospitalized at the Nottwil rehabilitation clinic near Lucerne. The years that followed were marked by extensive rehabilitation and a gradual adaptation to her new life.

In September 1996, Riccardo Cocciante brought her back to the stage, where she performed in front of thousands of people. The concert took place at the Basilica of St. Pius X in Lourdes, alongside musicians Leonardo De Amicis, Roberto Gallinelli, and Cocciante himself.

In the late 1990s, she performed the anthem "Corri treno – La mia speranza" for the Italian Catholic association Unitalsi, composed by Leonardo De Amicis and Massimo Bizzarri. She made her final television appearance on the program I fatti vostri. On February 11, 2000 she participated in the Giubileo degli Ammalati concert, performing Amici—the anthem for the World Day of the Sick—composed by Massimo Bizzarri, Giuseppe Marcucci, and Leonardo De Amicis, in front of Pope John Paul II.

== Discography ==
=== Singles ===
- 1980 – Ventilation / Warm love
- 1981 – Hypnotised / Warm love
- 1982 – Wild obsessions / Un coeur perdu
- 1984 – Sad Songs on the Radio / Love That's the strange one
- 1984 – Sisters under the Skin / This year's model
- 1992 – Coprimi / Cover me (RCA)
- 1995 – Galaxy of Love (feat. Dance or die)
- 1995 – Radar System (feat. Moratto)
- 2012 – In spirit (remixes) (feat. Lineki & Bern and Dilemma)

=== Compilations ===
- 1991 – Tchin Tchin (Pino Donaggio) with the tracks This love of mine and Cin cin
- 1990 – Solo tu with the track Pregherei (Let the Day)
- 1990 – Festivalbar Azzurro '92 with the track Coprimi
- 1995 – Hardcore Compilation Vol. 7 with the track Galaxy of Love
- 1995 – Dance Hits of July '95 with the track Galaxy of Love
- 1996 – Moratto & Dj Ricci feat. Scarlett – Eurouniverse

=== Contributions ===
- 1986 – Kissing the Pink – Certain things are likely
- 1987 – Living in a Box – Living in a box
- 1988 – Pregherei with Scialpi
- 1990 – Workstation feat Scarlett Wollenmann – The story is true
- 1991 – Dilemma – In spirit
- 1991 – Billy Preston – Heroes
- 1994 – Un Uomo Felice con Riccardo Cocciante – Io vivo per te
- 1995 – Morandi – 1995 (as a vocalist)
- 2000 – Amici
- 2000 – Corri Treno – La mia speranza – hymn Unitalsi
