= Terminator Salvation (soundtrack) =

Terminator Salvation (Original Soundtrack)

Film score by Danny Elfman
- Released: May 19, 2009
- Recorded: 2009
- Venues: AIR Studios, London
- Genre: Film score
- Length: 50:27
- Label: Reprise
- Producers: Danny Elfman; Carter Armstrong; Diarmuid Quinn; Marc Cimino

Danny Elfman chronology
Notorious (2009)	Terminator Salvation (2009)	Taking Woodstock (2009)

Terminator Salvation (Original Soundtrack) is the film score to the 2009 film Terminator Salvation directed by McG, which is the fourth installment of the Terminator franchise, serving as a sequel to Terminator 3: Rise of the Machines (2003). (Note: The film takes place prior to the previous Terminator films, but follows the films' canonical time-travel alterations, ultimately retconning certain events in the form of an alternate timeline.) The film score is composed by Danny Elfman and released through Reprise Records on May 19, 2009. The album features the end credits song "Rooster" by Alice in Chains.

== Background ==
Originally, McG wanted to hire Gustavo Santaolalla to work on the music for the human characters, while having either Radiohead's Thom Yorke or Jonny Greenwood compose Skynet's themes. However, those plans were curtailed due to their tight schedules. In January 2009, it was announced that Danny Elfman would compose the score and had already began writing music by then. Initially, there were no plans of using the original Terminator themes or incorporating the classic symphonic hook, but Elfman assured that the theme would be featured if it fits the appropriate tone of the film.

McG had met with the original Terminator composer Brad Fiedel but decided he did not want a repeat of the original score in his film. McG wanted Elfman's themes and ambient sounds to have a "Wagnerian quality". While Elfman had composed a different theme, it featured the five-note percussive sequence that had been featured in every Terminator film. Elfman used the Spectrasonics Omnisphere designed by Eric Persing for creating sounds for the Skynet. The use of Omnisphere along with Digital Performer sequencer provided him a vast library of electronic, synth sounds and psychoacoustics, coming up with multiple variations on each cue.

Common, who starred in an important role in the film, expressed his interest in writing a song for the soundtrack. However, Alice in Chains' "Rooster" is the only featured song. Although not included in the soundtrack, "You Could Be Mine" by Guns N' Roses, which was featured in Terminator 2: Judgment Day, can be heard briefly in a scene of the film as well. Reprise Records released the 15-track soundtrack on May 19, 2009.

== Track listing ==
All music is composed by Danny Elfman except "Rooster".

Terminator Salvation (Original Soundtrack) track listing
No.	Title	Writer(s)	Original artist	Length
1.	"Opening"			6:01
2.	"All Is Lost"			2:45
3.	"Broadcast"			3:19
4.	"The Harvester Returns"			2:45
5.	"Fireside"			1:31
6.	"No Plan"			1:43
7.	"Reveal / The Escape"			7:44
8.	"Hydrobot Attack"			1:49
9.	"Farewell"			1:40
10.	"Marcus Enters Skynet"			3:23
11.	"A Solution"			1:44
12.	"Serena"			2:28
13.	"Final Confrontation"			4:14
14.	"Salvation"			3:07
15.	"Rooster"	Jerry Cantrell	Alice in Chains	6:14
Total length:				50:27

== Reception ==
Chris McNeany of AV Forums rated 7/10 to the score, saying "Elfman's death-metal score for Terminator Salvation is a difficult thing to dislike, yet it is hardly something to write home about either. There is nothing here that you haven't heard before. The composer's trademark percussive overkill is brought to bear with vigour and its marriage to Fiedel's customary Skynet metallic bombast is appropriately fitting. Yet it can often feel like so much assembly-line, generic metal-man mayhem [...] This is definitely worth a listen ... although it is impossible to say, at this stage, whether or not “he'll be back” for another pop at the Terminator series." Finn White of IGN wrote "The music has the right sound and delivers all the right moments to convey a man-versus-machine action thriller, but is surprisingly one-dimensional and frankly a bit dull; especially considering the broad range of emotional and textural weapons in Elfman's arsenal." Bret Adams of AllMusic wrote "Elfman's richly textured music, topped off by the impact of Alice in Chains' "Rooster," makes the Terminator Salvation soundtrack stand tall on its own as a listening experience."

James Southall of Movie Wave wrote "the action music is all very solid, exciting in places, reminiscent of Elfman's style familiar since Planet of the Apes [...] there's an enjoyable three quarters of an hour to be spent here; Elfman doesn't pull up any trees, he just does this sort of thing very well and there's good fun to be had." Jonathan Broxton of Movie Music UK wrote "Neither the main theme nor the five-note percussive stamp appear in Elfman's score, which from my point of view is a somewhat unsatisfactory drift away from the franchise's established and popular sound." Filmtracks wrote "[Elfman's] score is fine. In fact, for a film of such predictable blockbuster limitations of intellect, the music often overachieves [...] [b]ut with the totally inexplicable dismissal of Fiedel's two major motifs from the first two films, a bad omen when considering another two sequels already in the process of being planned and produced, Elfman's foray into the Terminator universe has yielded an awkwardly orphaned and unnecessarily pedestrian piece of music."

Hugh Hart of Wired wrote that "Danny Elfman's aggressive score moves in for the kill." Scott Beggs of Film School Rejects wrote "Danny Elfman's score is at the same level (as is the sound editing) throughout, creating no change between intimate moments and fight scenes [...] the score itself is really uninspired, lifeless, and heard-before." Chris Bumbray of JoBlo.com described it a "a sub par Danny Elfman score that sounded like a Hans Zimmer rip-off".

== Personnel ==
Credits adapted from liner notes:

- Music composer and producer – Danny Elfman
- Soundtrack producer – Carter Armstrong, Diarmuid Quinn, Marc Cimino
- Conductor – Rick Wentworth
- Orchestrators – David Slonaker, Edgardo Simone, Jeff Atmajian, Steve Bartek
- Orchestra leader – Thomas Bowes
- Orchestra contractor – Isobel Griffiths
- Assistant contractor – Charlotte Matthews
- Recording – Peter Cobbin, Noah Snyder
- Mixing – Dennis Sands
- Mastering – Patricia Sullivan Fourstar
- Music editor – Bill Abbott
- Assistant music editor – Erich Stratmann
- Music preparation – Dakota Music Services
- MIDI supervision and preparation – Marc Mann
- Executive producer – Derek Anderson, Joel B. Michaels, McG, Tom Whalley, Victor Kubicek
- Art direction and design – Mathieu Bitton
