= Margherita (song) =

Single by Riccardo Cocciante

from the album Concerto per Margherita
- B-side: "Primavera"
- Released: 1976
- Genre: Pop
- Length: 4:31
- Label: RCA Italiana
- Songwriter(s): Marco Luberti, Riccardo Cocciante

Riccardo Cocciante singles chronology
"L'alba" (1975)	"Margherita" (1976)	"A mano a mano" (1978)

Audio
- "Margherita" on YouTube

"Margherita" is an Italian ballad song written by Marco Luberti and Riccardo Cocciante, arranged by Vangelis and performed by Riccardo Cocciante. It was the first single from Cocciante's 1976 album Concerto per Margherita.

The song was premiered in the RAI television program Adesso Musica. It peaked at the first place on the Italian singles chart, and is considered as the song which definitely consecrated Cocciante to fame following the success of his 1974 single "Bella senz'anima". According to Luberti, the lyrics were written straight at 4 am.

In 1978 Cocciante released Spanish, French and English language versions of the song, respectively titled "Margarita", "Marguerite" and "Just For You". The song was later covered by several artists, including Mina and Fiorella Mannoia. In 1999 and in 2006, Cocciante performed the song out of competition at the Sanremo Music Festival.

== Track listing ==
- 7" single – TPBO 1243

A. "Margherita" (Marco Luberti, Riccardo Cocciante) – 4:31
B. "Primavera" (Marco Luberti, Riccardo Cocciante) – 4:58

== Charts ==
Chart	Peak position
Italy	1

== Certifications ==
Region	Certification	Certified units/sales
Italy (FIMI) Sales since 2009	Platinum	100,000^{‡}
^{‡} Sales+streaming figures based on certification alone.
