= Io canto (song) =

1979 single by Riccardo Cocciante

"Io canto" is a song written by Riccardo Cocciante and Marco Luberti. Originally released in 1979 by Cocciante as the title single for his album …E io canto, the song became a hit in Italy. In the following years, it became an Italian standard.

In 2006, the song received new attention, following the release of a cover recorded by Italian singer Laura Pausini. Her version of the song was chosen as the first single from her album Io canto and charted across Europe, also reaching the top spot on the Italian Singles Chart.

== Riccardo Cocciante version ==
"Io canto"

Single by Riccardo Cocciante

from the album ...E io canto
- B-side: "Il treno"
- Released: January 1979
- Genre: Pop
- Length: 4:25
- Label: RCA Italiana
- Songwriters: Riccardo Cocciante, Marco Luberti
- Producer: Marco Luberti

Riccardo Cocciante singles chronology
"A mano a mano" (1978)	"Io canto" (1979)	"Cervo a primavera" (1980)

The original version of the song was recorded by Italian singer Riccardo Cocciante and released in January 1979 as a single from his studio album …E io canto, which was released during the same year. Cocciante, composer of the music, also arranged the song, while lyricist Marco Luberti was also credited as its producer.

A French-language version of the song, titled "Je chante" was released by Cocciante himself. He also recorded a Spanish-language version of the song, under the name "Yo canto", while an English-language adaptation of "Io canto", written in 1979 and titled "I'm singing", was released for the first time in 2009 only, as a track of Cocciante's album Fable.

The song was also included in Cocciante's compilation album Tutti i miei sogni, released in 2006.

=== Track listing ===
- 7" single
1. "Io canto" – 4:25
2. "Il treno" – 4:27

=== Charts ===
Chart (1979)	Peak position
France (SNEP)	74
Italy (Musica e dischi)	5

== Laura Pausini version ==
"Io canto"

Single by Laura Pausini

from the album Io canto
- Released: 13 October 2006
- Recorded: 2006 – Hanson Recording Studio, Hollywood, Los Angeles, California; Impatto Studio, Bologna, Italy; O.R.S. Oliveta Recording Studios, Castelbolognese, Ravenna, Italy
- Genre: Pop
- Length: 4:23 (Radio Edit); 4:16 (Album Version)
- Label: RCA Italiana
- Songwriters: Riccardo Cocciante, Marco Luberti
- Producer: Celso Valli

Laura Pausini singles chronology
"She (Uguale a lei)" (2006)	"Io canto" (2006)	"Spaccacuore" (2007)

Music video
- "Io canto" on YouTube

In 2006, Italian singer Laura Pausini recorded a cover of the song, including it in her album with the same title, entirely composed of covers of popular Italian songs, and released it as the lead single from the set. In January 2011, a poll conducted by the website Rockol.it declared Pausini's version of the song the best Italian cover of the decade.

In 2013, Pausini re-recorded the song as a duet with Belgian singer Lara Fabian, in an Italian-French version, for Pausini's second compilation album 20 – The Greatest Hits. It's included only in the Italian version of the album. The Spanish edition, instead, includes "Dispárame, dispara".

The music video for the song was directed by Gaetano Morbioli. The singles has sold 70,000 downloads in Italy.

=== Track listing ===
- Io canto – CD single
1. "Io canto"
2. "Yo canto"
3. "Io canto" (Instrumental)
- Je chante – CD single
1. "Io canto" – 4:18
2. "Je chante (Io canto)" – 4:22
- Io canto – digital download
1. "Io canto" (Radio Edit) – 4:23
- Yo canto – digital download
1. "Yo canto" (Radio Edit) – 4:16
- Je chante – digital download
1. "Je chante (Io canto)" – 4:23

=== Personnel ===
Music credits

- Luca Bignardi – programming
- Vinnie Colaiuta – drums
- Tony Franklin – bass guitar
- Greg Howe – electric guitar
- Michael Landau – electric guitar, acoustic guitar
- Laura Pausini – vocals, background vocals
- Antonella Pepe – background vocals
- Tim Pierce – electric guitar, acoutstic guitar
- Giorgio Secco – acoustic guitar
- Celso Valli – piano, keyboards, background vocals, arrangements

Production credits

- Celso Valli – producer
- Luca Bignardi – engineer, mixing
- Marco Borsatti – additional engineer
- Clark Germaine – engineer
- Tom Syrowsky – assistant
- Matt Serrecchio – assistant
- Nicola Fantozzi – assistant

=== Charts ===
Italian-language version

Chart (2006)	Peak position
Belgium (Ultratip Bubbling Under Flanders)	15
Belgium (Ultratop 50 Wallonia)	11
European Hot 100 Singles	39
France (SNEP)	26
Italy Digital Singles (FIMI)	2
Italy Airplay (Nielsen Music Control)	2
Italy Physical Singles (FIMI)	1
Switzerland (Schweizer Hitparade)	20
Switzerland Airplay (Schweizer Hitparade)	18

Spanish-language version

Chart (2006)	Peak position
Italy Digital Singles (FIMI)	23
US Latin Pop Airplay (Billboard)	32

=== Release history ===
Region	Date	Format	Label
Italy	13 October 2006	Airplay	Warner Music Italy
Italy	3 November 2006	CD single	Warner Music Italy
