= The Wolfman (soundtrack) =

Film score by Danny Elfman
- Released: February 23, 2010
- Recorded: 2009–2010
- Genre: Film score
- Length: 66:05
- Label: Varèse Sarabande

Danny Elfman chronology
9 (2009)	The Wolfman (2010)	Alice in Wonderland (2010)

The Wolfman (Original Motion Picture Soundtrack) is the score album to the 2010 film of the same name directed by Joe Johnston, which is a remake on the 1941 film The Wolf Man. The film initially had an original score composed by Danny Elfman, before it was rejected and Elfman eventually replaced by Austrian musician Paul Haslinger. The studio changed back to Elfman's initial score composed for the film after they felt Haslinger's electronic score did not suit the film's setting and tone.

Elfman's score was then completed with the help of other composers, due to the former's commitments on Alice in Wonderland (2010). Varèse Sarabande released the album consisting of Elfman's score for the original cut for the film on February 23, 2010. The score was well received by critics.

== Development ==
In August 2008, Danny Elfman was announced as the film's composer. He was drawn to the project due to growing up on The Wolf Man and other monster characters. Johnston wanted a score that was "atmospheric, stylish and narrative", and Elfman adhered to the former's instructions providing a dark, melodic and moody score. However, the studio rejected the score after the film was cut down half an hour in length and the music became too repetitive.

Due to the film's turbulent production, Elfman was unable to return to re-score the film due to contractual obligations to Tim Burton's Alice in Wonderland (2010). The producers eventually decided that rather than expand on his music with a new composer, a path that they would eventually take, they would instead attempt a completely different approach with a different composer which includes extensive reshooting of scenes. The idea was to quicken the pace and strike a tone similar to the Underworld films, turning a slow-paced story into a much faster one. In November 2009, it was announced that Elfman's music had been discarded in favor of a new score by Paul Haslinger. However, in January 2010, the producers switched back to Elfman's score after disliking Haslinger's electronic music.

Johnston later elaborated on the change-up between musicians: Elfman's score had fit tonally for a previous cut of the film that was half an hour longer than the released version, however, the music became repetitive after the film was recut. To Johnston's dismay, a higher-up at NBC/Universal suggested re-scoring the film with an electronic-like score after seeing a new trailer of the film that utilized similar music. As a result, Haslinger was hired, and Johnston felt the new composer was given an impossible task, stating, "when we put his music to the picture, even though the music was working, it was so out of context with what you were seeing."

Conrad Pope, Edward Shearmur and Thomas Lindgren were brought in to shape Elfman's score for the film's final edit and also compose 15 minutes of new material. British musician Lustmord further contributed additional music.

The score for The Wolfman has similarity to Wojciech Kilar's 1992 score for the film Bram Stoker's Dracula. In interviews Elfman admitted that he was inspired by the Kilar's music, and was attempting to recapture the sense of romantic classicism and lush horror that Francis Ford Coppola's film contained.

== Release ==
Danny Elfman's version of The Wolfman score was officially released on February 23, 2010, 11 days after the film's release through Varèse Sarabande. The album consisted of the actual score Elfman made for the earlier edit, before it was temporarily rejected. Thus, the music in the final film was mostly different from the original work on the CD release, which reflected the first incarnation of the score. A believed-to-be sample of Haslinger's rejected score was released around the same time, but was ultimately confirmed as false by record producer Ford A. Thaxton and Haslinger himself.

== Critical reception ==
Thomas Glorieux of Maintitles.net wrote "The Wolfman is a perfect score for a film, and realizing that this kind of quality music gets rejected is like saying you want to divorce from the perfect person." Christian Clemmensen of Filmtracks.com called it as "a strong score as presented" and wrote "like Sleepy Hollow, it's easy to get the impression that The Wolfman will be a score that appeals more to die-hard Elfman fans than the mainstream". James Christopher Monger of AllMusic wrote "there are enough genuine, Edward Scissorhands/Sleepy Hollow-inspired moments, where surprisingly memorable melody breaks through the graveyard dirt into the moonlit night, that there's no denying that the listener is truly in the presence of a master audio storyteller." The Hollywood Reporter wrote "Danny Elfman's reinstated score works awfully hard to inject excitement". Tim Grierson of Screen Daily wrote "Danny Elfman's knowingly bombastic score recalls his work with long-time collaborator Tim Burton but without the usual vigour or panache." James Southall of Movie Wave described it as "one of those glorious, darkly romantic gothic horror scores". A. O. Scott of The New York Times called it as "throbbing" and "stabbing".

== Track listing ==
The Wolfman (Original Motion Picture Soundtrack) track listing
No.	Title	Length
1.	"Wolf Suite, Pt. 1"	4:12
2.	"Wolf Suite, Pt. 2"	5:54
3.	"Prologue"	2:57
4.	"Dear Mr. Talbot"	1:45
5.	"Bad Moon Rising"	0:59
6.	"Gypsy Massacre"	2:23
7.	"Wake Up, Lawrence"	5:16
8.	"The Funeral"	4:13
9.	"The Healing Montage"	2:49
10.	"First Transformation"	3:30
11.	"You Must Go"	3:46
12.	"The Antique Shop"	3:32
13.	"Country Carnage"	2:31
14.	"Be Strong"	2:31
15.	"The Madhouse"	5:32
16.	"Reflection / 2nd Transformation"	4:11
17.	"The Traveling Montage"	4:26
18.	"The Finale"	4:11
19.	"Wolf Wild #2"	1:27
Total length:		66:05

== Personnel ==
Credits adapted from AllMusic:

- Music composed and produced by – Danny Elfman
- Additional music – Conrad Pope, Edward Shearmur, Thomas Lindgren, Lustmord
- Recording – Robert Fernandez
- Digital recordist – Vincent Cirilli
- Mixing – Alan Meyerson
- Mastering– Patricia Sullivan Fourstar
- Music editor – Bill Abbott, Shie Rozow, Shannon Erbe
- Assistant music editor – Denise Okimoto
- Score editor – Noah Snyder
- Music supervisor – Kathy Nelson
- Executive producer – Joe Johnston, Scott Stuber
- Technician – Richard Grant

Hollywood Studio Symphony

- Orchestration – Dave Slonaker, Edgardo Simone, Mark McKenzie, Michael Byron
- Supervising orchestrators – Steve Bartek, Conrad Pope
- Conductor – Pete Anthony, Conrad Pope
- Orchestra contractor – Gina Zimmitti
- Concertmaster – Bruce Dukov
- Music preparation – Reprise Music Services
- Scoring crew – Denis St. Amand, Dominic Gonzales, Stacey Robinson, Tim Lauber, Tom Steel

Instrumentation

- Bass – Bruce Morgenthaler, Chris Kollgaard, Drew Dembowski, Ed Meares, Frances Liu Wu, Oscar Hidalgo, Peter Doubrovsky, Sue Ranney
- Bassoon – Rose Corrigan
- Cello – Andrew Shulman, Tony Cooke, Armen Ksajikian, Cecilia Tsan, Tina Soule, Chris Ermacoff, Dennis Karmazyn, Erika Duke-Kirkpatrick, Kim Scholes, Giovanna Clayton, Paul Cohen, Steve Erdody, Steve Richards, Tim Loo
- Clarinet – Stuart Clark
- Flute – Louise Ditullio
- French horn – Dan Kelley, Jenny Kim, Kristy Morrell, Mark Adams, Phil Yao, Steve Becknell
- Harp – Katie Kirkpatrick
- MIDI controller – Marc Mann
- Oboe – Leslie Reed
- Percussion – Bob Zimmitti, Mike Fisher, Wade Culbreath
- Piano – Randy Kerber
- Timpani – Peter Limonick
- Viola – Brett Banducci, Brian Dembow, Darrin McCann, David Walther, Denyse Buffum, Karie Prescott, Keith Greene, Lynne Richburg, Marlow Fisher, Matt Funes, Mike Nowak, Rob Brophy, Roland Kato, Sam Formicola, Shawn Mann, Thomas Diener, Vickie Miskolczy
- Violin – Alan Grunfeld, Alyssa Park, Belinda Broughton, Carol Pool, Christian Hebel, Darius Campo, Eun-Mee Ahn, Helen Nightengale, Jackie Brand, Jennie Levin, Joel Derouin, Josefina Vergara, Julie Gigante, Julie Rogers, Katia Popov, Kevin Connolly, Lily Ho Chen, Marc Sazer, Natalie Leggett, Neel Hammond, Phil Levy, Roberto Cani, Roger Wilkie, Sara Parkins, Sarah Thornblade, Shalini Vijayan, Sid Page, Tami Hatwan, Tereza Stanislav, Yelena Yegoryan, Richard Altenbach

Page LA Studio Voices

- Vocal contractor – Bobbi Page
- Vocalists – Aleta Braxton-O'Brien, Alvin Chea, Amick Byram, Amy Fogerson, Bob Joyce, Bobbi Page, Christine Guter, Cindy Bourquin, Clydene Jackson, Diane Reynolds, Richard Wells, Elin Carlson, Elissa Johnston, Fletcher Sheridan, Greg Jasperse, Gregg Geiger, Guy Maeda, Joanna Bushnell, Jonathan Mack, Kimberly Switzer, Leanna Brand, Linda Harmon, Luana Jackman, Marc A. Pritchett, Mary Hylan, Michael Geiger, Michael Lichtenauer, Reid Bruton, Renee Burkett, Rick Logan, Sally Stevens, Steve Amerson, Susie Stevens-Logan, Tonoccus McClain, Vatsche Barsoumian, Walt Harrah

Management

- Album supervision (Universal Pictures) – David Buntz
- Executive album producer (Varèse Sarabande) – Robert Townson
