= Alice in Wonderland (film score) =

Alice in Wonderland (An Original Walt Disney Records Soundtrack)

Film score by Danny Elfman
- Released: March 2, 2010
- Recorded: December 2009–January 2010
- Venues: California; London, England
- Studios: Sony Scoring Stage; Abbey Road Studios; Air Studios; Eastwood Scoring Stage, Warner Bros.
- Genres: Pop; classical; orchestral
- Length: 50:59
- Label: Walt Disney

Danny Elfman chronology
The Wolfman (2010)	Alice in Wonderland (2010)	The Next Three Days (2010)

Alice in Wonderland (An Original Walt Disney Records Soundtrack) is the score album to the 2010 film Alice in Wonderland directed by Tim Burton and produced by Walt Disney Pictures, which is a live-action adaptation of Disney's 1951 film and re-imagining of Lewis Carroll's works. The film's original score is composed by Danny Elfman, a regular collaborator of Burton.

Elfman did not opt for a periodic music and instead blended orchestral, classical and pop music into the score, to highlight the internal music of the film, despite the setting of 19th century England. The score was recorded during December 2009—January 2010, in two sessions held in California and London, in various studios. A 95-piece orchestra recorded the musical cues, and the Sibelius scorewriter program was used for score preparation. As with several Burton's filmography, Elfman incorporated several techniques of popular composers, such as Max Steiner and Bernard Herrmann, by complementing the visual style with orchestral music.

The album consisting of 24 tracks, released by Walt Disney Records on March 2, 2010, accompanying the concept album Almost Alice, for the film. The score was positively received, with Elfman's composition received praise, and had also featured in number 89 in Billboard 200 music charts. The score received nominations for BAFTA Award for Best Film Music, Golden Globe Award for Best Original Score and Grammy Award for Best Score Soundtrack for Visual Media, respectively.

== Background ==
Elfman opined that the score is about "finding the narrative and finding the themes and trying to knit things together and form continuity", and also added that "the decision-making process is about who gets a theme and who doesn't. You can't just give every character a theme." He experimented with the score, by find a central theme and 2–3 secondary themes, and determining on how it can be played, which he called as a "fun" and "surprise". He also felt using a theme over character, in a certain logic, when the scene is about a character or the trajectory revolving around it. He called it as an "inventive challenge", but the purpose is "to add energy and motion and anticipation and a sense of something building".

The film takes place in England of the 19th century, but Elfman did not use periodic music as he felt that the score had to "allude to that period" and will become "boring". He added "you're going to play the characters and you're going to play internally, and when you start playing internally there really aren't any rules. In something like Alice in Wonderland there are even less rules. Who knows what kind of music does or doesn't belong in Wonderland, after all? Outside of Wonderland, at the beginning of the film and at the end of the movie, I'm really just trying to establish some of the themes that will come back." He also added that, for sequences in Wonderland, he tried to incorporate the same thematic ideas as being "a believer in thematic unity and the importance of that in a storytelling film", he felt that "there are certain types of film where it simply doesn't matter, but when you have a crazy story that you're following through and there are a lot of crazy characters, it does matter."

== Composition ==
The scoring began in December 2009, where recording happened in two sessions: the first session was held at the Sony Scoring Stage, in Sony Pictures Studios, Culver City, California and Eastwood Scoring Stage, Warner Bros. Studios, Los Angeles, California. The second recording session held in London at the Abbey Road Studios and Air Studios. A 95-piece orchestra was utilised in the score. For scoring each sequences of the film, Elfman visited the film's set design built at the Sony Pictures Studios to spot inspiration for the musical cues, similar to what he did for Batman (1989). Like his previous films, he developed a scoring technique, which he said:

"I look at the film, I get an idea, I start to play it and I start to lay more parts on and lay more parts on until I've gotten maybe several minutes or more of a scene composed. And I do all the orchestration everything until it sounds complete [...] and come back in and start from scratch without listening to what I've just done. And the idea is to try to take any scene that has any importance, I'm going to approach it 3, 4, maybe half a dozen times. And then I'll go back and listen to everything I just did."

He continued the process, until multiple variations of the themes had been created, and nearly had 23 pieces of music. During the scoring sessions, he had nearly 3–4 pieces for each sequence and asked Tim on which piece to be used, with some pieces being rejected and some were elaborated into different variations, in order to have to "follow this particular character or feeling". In an interview with Hugh Hart of Wired, Elfman said that writing the music for Alice's trajectory was a hard part as "he needed the music to tie it all together as she goes from this kind of confused child to a bewildered young lady to becoming Alice as a hero who finds herself in the center of this big story where she has a huge part to play".

Elfman, however added that the score will not be about the Mad Hatter or the Red Queen, as they play supporting roles in the film, and the story revolves around Alice. As like most of the soundtracks from Burton's films, Elfman infused the symphonic orchestrations to compliment the visual style, as similar to the works of Erich Wolfgang Korngold, Max Steiner, Franz Waxman and especially Bernard Hermann. By February 2010, Elfman wrote the last piece of music, which was the Fudderwacken, that played during the dance sequence of Mad Hatter. The mastering of the score began in early-February. The musical cues were produced with the help of the score-writing software called Sibelius, named after the Finnish composer Jean Sibelius. Copyist Ron Vermillion had admitted the software helped to write much of the score notes, as manually a large orchestra could not produce much due to time constraints. In March 2010, as a part of the promotions, snippets from the scoring sessions were broadcast in the Good Morning America television show on ABC News.

== Track listing ==
All music is composed by Danny Elfman, except where noted

No.	Title	Writer(s)	Length
1.	"Alice's Theme"		5:07
2.	"Little Alice"		1:34
3.	"Proposal / Down the Hole"		2:58
4.	"Doors"		1:51
5.	"Drink Me"		2:48
6.	"Into the Garden"		0:49
7.	"Alice Reprise #1"		0:26
8.	"Bandersnatched"	Elfman; T. J. Lindgren	2:42
9.	"Finding Absolem"		2:41
10.	"Alice Reprise #2"		0:38
11.	"The Cheshire Cat"		2:07
12.	"Alice And Bayard's Journey"	Elfman; Lindgren	4:04
13.	"Alice Reprise #3"		0:24
14.	"Alice Escapes"	Elfman; Lindgren	1:07
15.	"The White Queen"		0:36
16.	"Only A Dream"		1:25
17.	"The Dungeon"	Elfman; Deborah Lurie	2:18
18.	"Alice Decides"		3:14
19.	"Alice Reprise #4"		1:01
20.	"Going To Battle"	Elfman; Lindgren	2:41
21.	"The Final Confrontation"		1:41
22.	"Blood of the Jabberwocky"		2:37
23.	"Alice Returns"		3:14
24.	"Alice Reprise #5"		2:55
Total length:			50:59

== Reception ==
Elfman's score received positive critical reception. Jonathan Broxton wrote "What is even more impressive, however, is the knowledge that Elfman's the composer of intellectual authority is as much in play here as Elfman the enthusiastic newcomer; the vibrancy of the work, the structure of the themes, the cleverness of the orchestrations and harmonies, combined with the flavors of the past, make this score indispensable. Even by his own recent high standards, it's the best Elfman score in many years, and even at this early stage a contender for the best score of 2010." Filmtracks.com said "The experience of its creation may have been a crazy, hectic one for the composer, but he accomplished something not heard since Sommersby in 1993: an unequivocally entertaining, five-star Elfman masterpiece."

In a review, Screen Rant's Paul Young, felt that the score was "rehashed", despite being "extremely dark and beautiful". Jake Coyle of The Repository called the score "keeps the mood dark". James Christopher Monger of Allmusic called it as " one of his most memorable themes since Edward Scissorhands, and a fine return to the dark, gothic, orchestral pop of The Nightmare Before Christmas." Hugh Hart of Wired wrote "Underscored by composer Danny Elfman‘s plush orchestrations, Alice treads an extravagantly visual path between waking dreams and comatose realities."

== Charts ==
Chart (2010)	Peak position
U.K. Soundtrack Albums (OCC)	7
U.S. Billboard 200	89
U.S. Billboard Top Soundtracks	9

== For Your Consideration ==
As with all awards season, a For Your Consideration album was released on late-2010; there are 15 tracks, with notable differences from the general release.

No.	Title	Length
1.	"Main Titles"	3:01
2.	"The Proposal/Rabbit Chase"	0:57
3.	"Down The Hole"	1:03
4.	"Drink Me"	3:01
5.	"In Court"	1:51
6.	"Bayard & White Queen"	1:43
7.	"Liars/Vorpal Sword"	2:20
8.	"Alice Escapes"	2:02
9.	"Execution"	3:43
10.	"Only A Dream"	1:46
11.	"Alice Decides, Part 1"	3:17
12.	"Alice Decides, Part 2"	1:27
13.	"Alice Decides, Part 3"	1:10
14.	"Going To Battle"	3:29
15.	"Alice Returns"	3:19
Total length:		34:09

== Accolades ==
Award	Category	Recipient	Result
64th British Academy Film Awards	Best Film Music	Danny Elfman	Nominated
68th Golden Globe Awards	Best Original Score	Danny Elfman	Nominated
53rd Annual Grammy Awards	Best Score Soundtrack Album For Motion Picture, Television Or Other Visual Media	Danny Elfman	Nominated
