= Taking Woodstock (soundtrack) =

2009 soundtrack albums

Taking Woodstock (Original Motion Picture Soundtrack)

Soundtrack album by various artists
- Released: August 21, 2009
- Genre: Film soundtrack
- Length: 61:21
- Label: Rhino Entertainment
- Producers: Cheryl Pawelski; Jeff Roth

Taking Woodstock (Original Motion Picture Score)

Film score by Danny Elfman
- Released: August 21, 2009
- Genre: Film score
- Length: 30:05
- Label: La-La Land Records
- Producer: Danny Elfman

Danny Elfman chronology
Terminator Salvation (2009)	Taking Woodstock (2009)	9 (2009)

Taking Woodstock (Original Motion Picture Soundtrack) and Taking Woodstock (Original Motion Picture Score) are the two albums released for the 2009 film Taking Woodstock directed by Ang Lee based on the 2007 memoir Taking Woodstock: A True Story of a Riot, a Concert and a Life. Both albums were released under the Rhino Entertainment and La-La Land Records respectively on August 21, 2009.

== Release ==
The soundtrack to Taking Woodstock was released through Rhino Entertainment on August 21, 2009. The album featured a new recording of "Freedom" by Richie Havens, 1960s songs performed by the Doors, Jefferson Airplane, Love and Crosby, Stills & Nash and live performances or songs from the Woodstock in 1969, which includes performances from Grateful Dead, Arlo Guthrie, Country Joe McDonald, Canned Heat, Janis Joplin, Melanie and Band. Three score cues from Danny Elfman's score was also featured in the soundtrack album, while a separate album for the score was released on the same date by La-La Land Records. A deluxe edition featuring both the songs and score was also released.

The physical CD release of the soundtrack was priced at $18.98. The digital version which featured the soundtrack and score as separate albums were priced at $11.99 each, while the iTunes exclusive deluxe version was priced for $19.99.

== Reception ==
Thom Jurek of AllMusic wrote "In sum, this is an enjoyable collection of songs that reflects the era more than the festival itself, but then it's a soundtrack. It also feels like a solid memento from the film." Joanne Kaufman of The Wall Street Journal wrote "the songs by Melanie, Richie Havens, Ravi Shankar and the Grateful Dead that make up the soundtrack place the movie in the '60s without particularly placing it at ground zero."

Filmtracks wrote "you have to admire Elfman's take on Taking Woodstock, even if it doesn't make for a particularly attractive 30-minute listening experience on album." William Ruhlmann of AllMusic stated, "This is not one of Elfman's major scoring efforts, but it is appropriate to the material at hand."

Richard von Brusack of Metro Silicon Valley wrote "The soundtrack by Danny Elfman doesn't frog-march the viewer down Memory Lane—a few familiar songs, like "Wooden Ships" and "Going Up the Country," appear, but they're lesser-known psychedelia." Jamie Darlow of Collider said that, "The film itself contains hardly any of his original score and the balancing act of original music and the music of the era depicted tips considerably in favor of the latter. However, despite it not being one of his most well-known pieces, there is a lot of joy to be had when listening to the score separately, and you can feel how satisfying it must have felt to record the psychedelic guitar work. This is a great example of listening to his work separate from watching the movie, as the sound conveys emotion just as powerfully (if not even more so) than the image."

== Track listing ==
Taking Woodstock (Original Motion Picture Soundtrack) track listing
No.	Title	Artist(s)	Length
1.	"Freedom" (2009)	Richie Havens	5:10
2.	"Taking Woodstock Titles"	Danny Elfman	3:28
3.	"Wooden Ships"	Crosby, Stills & Nash	5:29
4.	"China Cat Sunflower" (Live)	Grateful Dead	5:32
5.	"Maggie M'Gill"	The Doors	4:25
6.	"Elliot's Place"	Danny Elfman	1:10
7.	"Coming into Los Angeles" (Live)	Arlo Guthrie	2:12
8.	"I-Feel-Like-I'm-Fixin'-to-Die-Rag" (Live)	Country Joe McDonald	3:11
9.	"Going Up the Country" (Live)	Canned Heat	3:21
10.	"Try (Just A Little Bit Harder)" (Live)	Janis Joplin	4:53
11.	"A Happening – Office #2"	Danny Elfman	1:54
12.	"The Red Telephone"	Love	4:44
13.	"Beautiful People" (Live)	Melanie	4:26
14.	"I Shall Be Released" (Live)	Band	4:01
15.	"Perspective Extended"	Danny Elfman	1:52
16.	"One More Mile"	The Paul Butterfield Blues Band	3:30
17.	"Volunteers"	Jefferson Airplane	2:03
Total length:			61:21

Taking Woodstock (Original Motion Picture Score) track listing
No.	Title	Length
1.	"Taking Woodstock – Titles"	3:25
2.	"Elliot's Place"	1:11
3.	"At Ease Man"	0:43
4.	"Welcome Home"	0:34
5.	"The Magic Tickets"	0:35
6.	"Get The Money"	1:05
7.	"Chocolate Milk"	0:42
8.	"Groovy Thing – Office #1"	3:35
9.	"A Happening – Office #2"	1:55
10.	"Groovy Thing – Guitar Solo"	1:54
11.	"Life Goes On"	0:41
12.	"The Acid Trip"	1:13
13.	"Hash Brownies"	1:00
14.	"In the Mud"	0:50
15.	"Perspective Extended"	1:52
16.	"I Love Her"	0:49
17.	"Woodstock Wildtrack #1"	2:42
18.	"Woodstock Wildtrack #2"	1:37
19.	"Happy Guitars" (CD Only)	1:46
20.	"Guitar Improv" (CD Only)	1:56
Total length:		30:05

== Charts ==
Chart (2009)	Peak position
US Top Soundtracks (Billboard)	23
