= Rick Wentworth =

British film and TV composer

Rick Wentworth is a British film and TV composer, conductor, orchestrator and arranger.

== Composer ==
His work in film began with composing the score for Withnail and I, directed by Bruce Robinson in 1987, followed by Robinson's second film How To Get Ahead in Advertising. Both were produced by Handmade Films. Wentworth's TV credits include the Jonathan Creek (series and specials), four seasons of the ITV drama Ultimate Force for Bentley Productions, Between the Lines and Cracker for which Wentworth received a BAFTA nomination. He has also written music for many advertising campaigns, including Nissan, Kellogg's, American Express, Burger King, American Airlines, Ford and Guinness.

== Conducting ==
In addition to conducting his own work, Wentworth has conducted film scores including Tomb Raider, Charlie and the Chocolate Factory (2005), Hellboy II, Notorious B.I.G., the Oscar-nominated Milk (2008), The Boys Are Back (2009), Alice in Wonderland, Dark Shadows and Frankenweenie (2012). His string arrangements can be heard on tracks from artists including The Lightning Seeds, Blur, Del Amitri and in 2008/09 Musical Direction for the Rough Trade artistes Belle & Sebastian and Codeine Velvet Club (2009).

== Collaborations ==
His formative work involved assisting the late composer Sir Michael Tippett bring his opera The Ice Break to its premier performance at the Royal Opera House. Wentworth has a long association with Pink Floyd founding member Roger Waters, and co-produced, orchestrated and conducted the music for his opera, Ça Ira. The opera was recorded in USA and Europe featuring Bryn Terfel, Paul Groves and Ying Huang. It reached No.1 in the American classical chart, and received Platinum sales in Poland. He conducted the world premiere of the overture from Ça Ira in 2002, played by the Royal Philharmonic Orchestra at the Royal Albert Hall. He also arranged and conducted a collection of Roger Waters's tracks, fronted by Waters and his band. He has since conducted the world premier performance of the opera in Rome followed by performances in Poland, Kiev and at the Manaus Opera House in the Brazilian Rainforest of the Amazon. Ça Ira opened the opera season at the Theatro Municipal in São Paulo in April 2013. All performances were conducted by Rick to sell-out audiences. In August of the same year he conducted Ça Ira which opened the annual Cultural Festival at the Gotaplatsen in Gothenburg and featured an international cast of singers, Sally Matthews, Bryan Hymel, Owen Gradus and Christian Van Horn including Roger Waters who acted as narrator to an audience of over ten thousand.

Wentworth also orchestrated and conducted the modern opera Giulietta e Romeo in 2007 for European composer Riccardo Cocciante, which had its premiere at the Arena in Verona and has subsequently toured throughout Italy.

Other collaborations include writing and producing songs with George Benson, Patti Austin, Grace Jones and Paul McCartney, who commissioned him to orchestrate and conduct a personal animated film entitled The Light From Within (yet to be released). Wentworth also orchestrate arrangements for McCartney's televised appearance at the Nobel Peace Prize presentations.

He also collaborated with writer David Levin and wrote six songs for his 2009 musical production People, which premiered at the Edinburgh Festival in that year.

Wentworth has served on the panel of judges for the British Academy of Film and Television Awards (BAFTA) and the Royal Television Society Awards (RTS), and is a current serving Board member of the Akram Khan Dance Company.

== Recording ==
Wentworth has recorded soundtracks for several high-profile films at Air Studios in Hampstead, England.

== Credits ==
=== Film composer credits ===
1999

- Monsieur Pett

1999

- The Dybbuk

1992

- Freddie as F.R.O.7

1989

- How to Get Ahead in Advertising

1987

- Withnail and I

=== TV composer credits ===
2014

- Jonathan Creek – The Curse of the Bronze Lamp
- Jonathan Creek – The Sinner and the Sandman
- Jonathan Creek – The Letters of Septimus Noone

2013

- Jonathan Creek – The Clue of the Savant's Thumb

2010

- Jonathan Creek – The Judas Tree (feature-length TV Special)

2009

- Jonathan Creek – The Grinning Man (feature-length TV Special)

2007

- Robbie The Reindeer in Close Encounters of the Herd Kind (Comic Relief)

2006

- Ultimate Force (4 Seasons, 21 Episodes from 2002 – 2006)
- The Good Housekeeping Guide
- Dalziel and Pascoe (5 feature-length episodes from 2004 – 2006)

2003/4

- Jonathan Creek (12 one-hour episodes)

2002

- D.I.Y. Hard
- Paradise Heights (6 episodes)
- Little Ghosts (48 episodes)

2000

- The Last Polar Bears
- Blind Ambition

1999

- The Alchemists (6-hour episodes)

1998

- Silent Witness (6-hour episodes)

1997

- Prohibition: Thirteen Years That Changed America (12 Episodes)
- Cracker – White Ghost (Feature Length TV Special)

1996

- Cracker (2 Seasons from 1995–1996)
- The Moonstone
- The Writing On The Wall (4 Feature Length Episodes)

1995

- Rules of Engagement

1993

- Between The Lines (13 hour episodes)

1992

- Sam Saturday (6 hour episodes)

1991

- Sleepers (4 hour episodes)
- White Goods (4 hour episodes)
- Work!

=== Musical/opera credits ===
2010

- Bet Your Bottom Dollar

2009

- People

2007

- Giulietta e Romeo

2004

- Ca Ira

=== Conductor/Musical Director credits ===
2014

- Big Eyes
- Roger Waters: The Wall

2013

- Peabody and Sherman

2012

- Hitchcock
- Promised Land
- Dark Shadows
- Frankenweenie

2010

- Alice in Wonderland

2009

- The Boys Are Back
- Terminator Salvation
- Notorious
- Monsieur Pett

2008

- Milk
- The Duchess
- Hellboy II: The Golden Army
- Journal of a Contract Killer

2005

- Corpse Bride
- Charlie and the Chocolate Factory

2003

- Pirates Of The Caribbean: The Curse of the Black Pearl
- Ned Kelly

2002

- The Time Machine

2001

- Lara Croft: Tomb Raider

1997

- Dobermann

1995

- Restoration

1989

- How To Get Ahead In Advertising

=== Orchestrator/arranger credits ===
2014

- Roger Waters: The Wall

2007

- Robbie the Reindeer in Close Encounters of the Herd Kind

2005

- Goal!

2001

- Rat Race
- Lara Croft: Tomb Raider

2000

- Love's Labours Lost

1996

- All Dogs Go To Heaven 2

1990

- Die Hard 2

1989

- How To Get Ahead in Advertising

1988

- The Adventures of Baron Münchausen

1982

- Fourscore The Channel 4 Theme (composer David Dundas)
