= Il tuo bacio è come un rock =

1959 song by Adriano Celentano

Single by Adriano Celentano
- Released: 1959
- Length: 2:02
- Label: Jolly

Adriano Celentano singles chronology
"Il ribelle" (1959)	"Il tuo bacio è come un rock" (1959)	"Teddy Girl" (1959)

Audio
- "Il tuo bacio è come un rock" on YouTube

"Il tuo bacio è come un rock" ('Your kiss is like a rock song') is a 1959 Italian song by Adriano Celentano. It marked the breakout of Celentano.

== Overview ==
The song's lyrics were written by Piero Vivarelli and Lucio Fulci, with Adriano Celentano and Ezio Leoni composing the music. Its initial title was "Torna a Capri mon amour", and the song had different lyrics, but once it was rejected by the selection jury of the Ancona Music Festival, which included Armando Trovajoli and Gianni Ferrio, Vivarelli and Fulci rewrote the lyrics and resubmitted it for the festival. The song was eventually accepted by the jury, won the festival and marked the breakout of Celentano becoming a massive hit, notably selling over 300,000 copies only in its first week.

Artists who covered the song include Natalino Otto, Little Tony, Carla Boni, Gabriella Ferri and Tony Romano.

== Track listing ==
No.	Title	Lyrics	Music	Length
1.	"Il tuo bacio è come un rock"	Piero Vivarelli, Lucio Fulci	Adriano Celentano, Ezio Leoni	2:02
2.	"I ragazzi del juke-box"	Enzo Bonagura, Ugo Mattone	Eros Sciorilli	1:58

== Charts ==
Chart (1959)	Peak position
Italy (Musica e dischi)	12
