= Mino Vergnaghi =

Italian singer and songwriter (born 1955)

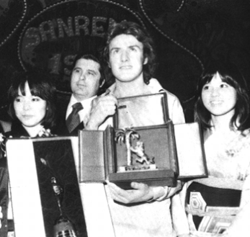

Background information
- Born: 10 April 1955 (age 71); Trivero, Province of Biella, Italy
- Genres: Pop
- Occupations: Singer, songwriter

Mino Vergnaghi (10 April 1955, Trivero) is an Italian singer and songwriter. In 1979 he won the Sanremo Music Festival with the song "Amare".

== Life and career ==
Born in Trivero, Vergnaghi started his career as lead singer of a number of groups, including Il segno dello zodiaco and Bora Bora. In 1978 he started a solo career under the production of Iva Zanicchi and Maestro Ezio Leoni, debuting with the single "Parigi addio". One year later he was the winner of the 29th edition of the Sanremo Music Festival with "Amare".

In 1980, Vergnaghi temporarily left the music industry and moved to England, returning to Italy in the late 1980s. He then entered the Zucchero Fornaciari's staff, collaborating with him as composer and backing vocalist.

Preceded by Matia Bazar	Winner of the Sanremo Music Festival; 1979	Succeeded by Toto Cutugno
