= 9 (soundtrack) =

9: Original Motion Picture Soundtrack

Soundtrack album by Danny Elfman and Deborah Lurie
- Released: August 31, 2009
- Recorded: 2008–2009
- Genre: Film soundtrack
- Length: 49:28
- Label: Relativity Music Group
- Producer: Deborah Lurie

Deborah Lurie chronology
Spring Breakdown (2009)	9 (2009)	Dear John (2010)

Danny Elfman chronology
Taking Woodstock (2009)	9 (2009)	The Wolfman (2010)

9: Original Motion Picture Soundtrack is the soundtrack album to the 2009 animated film of the same name released by Relativity Music Group on August 31, 2009, in digital and physical formats, nine days before the film's release. The album features original score cues composed by Deborah Lurie and themes composed by Danny Elfman, and features an original song "Welcome Home" written, composed and performed by Coheed and Cambria and lyrics by Claudio Sanchez.

== Development ==
The score is composed and produced by Deborah Lurie, an assistant producer for Elfman, who had worked for over two-and-a-half months for the score. Elfman had assisted her on providing the themes for the film. She recorded mostly a lot of brass and winds, that made up a 100-piece orchestra and a choir singing in the conclusion, recorded by Metro Voices. In addition to that, she played most of the synthesizer parts as the film had more electronic sounds, and used Pro Tools software programming for the minimal orchestral pieces. The score was recorded at Air Studios in London.

== Reception ==
James Christopher Monger of AllMusic mentioned that Lurie's score "dutifully complements the film's grim (yet oddly hopeful) premise of an alternate world where a small band of rag dolls attempts to rescue civilization from the machines bent on destroying it. Lurie, with a little help from Danny Elfman, fills the world of 9 with dark orchestral wonder peppered with the occasional ray of sunshine that suggests a heavy childhood diet of John Williams scores." Kirk Honeycutt of The Hollywood Reporter called the score as "rousing symphonic", while Lisa Schwarzbaum of Entertainment Weekly called Lurie's score as "resonant". Pop Dose commented "the music by Deborah Lurie is dark, moody and heroic when appropriate. It's a challenging soundtrack for children to sit through, no doubt." Eugene Ahn of Slant Magazine called it as "gripping and fantastic score". Peter Hartlaub of San Antonio Express-News wrote "Danny Elfman's score is strong".

== Track listing ==
No.	Title	Length
1.	"Introduction"	1:42
2.	"Finding Answers"	1:48
3.	"Sanctuary"	2:12
4.	"Winged Beast"	4:28
5.	"Reunion/Searching for Two"	2:12
6.	"The Machines"	0:58
7.	"Out There"	2:42
8.	"Twins"	1:36
9.	"Slaying the Beast"	1:21
10.	"Return of the Machines"	2:47
11.	"Burial"	1:24
12.	"Reawakening"	3:10
13.	"The Aftermath"	1:41
14.	"Confrontation"	1:53
15.	"The Seamstress"	2:05
16.	"Return to the Workshop"	1:54
17.	"The Purpose"	5:20
18.	"Release"	4:00
19.	"Welcome Home" (performed by Coheed and Cambria)	6:15
Total length:		49:28

== Credits ==
- Music composer and producer – Deborah Lurie
- Themes – Danny Elfman
- Additional arrangements – Gerard Marino, Matthew Lewkowicz, T.J. Lindgren, Todd Haberman
- Choir – Metro Voices
- Choirmaster – Jenny O'Grady
- Conductor – Gavin Greenaway
- Score co-ordinator – Carlos José Alvarez
- Copyist – J.J. Lee, Junko Tamura
- Music preparation – Thanh Tran
- Additional music editor – Bill Abbott
- Music editor – Shie Rozow
- Orchestra leader – Thomas Bowes
- Mastering – Dave Collins
- Mixing – Casey Stone
- Orchestration – Penka Kouneva
- Additional orchestration – Benoit Grey, Dallas Aimer, Philip Klein
- Score recordist – Chris Barrett

== Songs not featured in the album ==
- "Dies Irae" chant, performed by Crispin Glover (used in the background score)
- "Over the Rainbow" from The Wizard of Oz (1939), performed by Judy Garland — The song plays in a lighthearted scene when the surviving stitchpunks were celebrating the destruction of the factory and played it on a 78rpm phonograph record.
- "The Captain" by The Knife — used in the film's trailer

== Awards ==
Curt Sobel and Christopher Benstead received nomination for Outstanding Achievement in Sound Editing – Musical for Feature Film at the Golden Reel Awards in 2009, and lost to Michael Jackson's This Is It.
