= Un uomo felice =

Studio album by Riccardo Cocciante
- Released: 1994
- Studio: Wolff Studio, Rome, Italy
- Genre: Italian pop; Latin pop; Europop
- Length: 43:25
- Language: Italian; English
- Label: Virgin Italy
- Producer: Riccardo Cocciante

Riccardo Cocciante chronology
Il mio nome è Riccardo (1994)	Un uomo felice (1994)	Je chante (1995)

Un uomo felice (A Happy Man) is the twentieth studio album by Riccardo Cocciante, released in 1994 through Virgin Italy. Un uomo felice features Cocciante singing duet performances with Mietta, Mina, Scarlett Von Wollenmann, Tosca, and Francesca Belleni, all covering themes of love. With the exception of "I'd Fly", the duet with Bellenis, all the songs on the album are in Italian.

Un uomo felice remained on the Billboard Hits of The World album charts for over ten weeks and reached #95 on the European Top 100 Albums chart.

A Spanish version of Un uomo felice was released by Sony in Spain in 1995 as Un hombre feliz, with most of the same songs sung in Spanish. The singers for the duets were the Spanish artists Mónica Naranjo, Montserrat Martí and Mina, who sang on the original Italian album.

== Songs ==
The songs are in Italian except for "I'd Fly", Cocciante's hit song "Per lei" with original English lyrics written by Roxanne Seeman. The title track, "Un uomo felice", is an Italian adaption and cover version of the French song "Un homme heureux", written by William Sheller. The album includes Cocciante's Italian version of the song "L'amour existe encore" recorded by Celine Dion on her French Dion Chante Plamondon album.

== Track listing ==
All tracks are written by Riccardo Cocciante, except where noted.

No.	Title	Writer(s)	Length
1.	"Un uomo felice"		3:31
2.	"Amore" (feat Mina)		5:15
3.	"E pensare che pensavo mi pensassi almeno un po'" (feat. Mietta)		3:43
4.	"Due"	Cocciante, Audio 2, Jean-Loup Dabadie	4:18
5.	"Io vivo per te" (feat. Scarlett Von Wollenmann)		4:29
6.	"Nel locale di jazz" (feat. Baraonna)		3:46
7.	"Sulla tua pelle" (feat. Mietta)		4:32
8.	"I'd Fly (Per lei)" (feat. Francesca Bellenis)	Cocciante, Jean-Paul Dreau, Roxanne Seeman	5:12
9.	"L'amore esiste ancora" (feat. Tosca)	Cocciante, Luc Plamondon	4:11
10.	"Sopra un preludio di Bach"	Cocciante, Jean-Claude Vannier	4:28

An Italian version of "I'd Fly" ("Per lei") appears on Riccardo Cocciante's Tutti i miei sogni 3 CD compilation set released in 2006.

The Italian release of Un uomo felice coincided with a series of concerts in Rome, followed by Cocciante's performance at the Zenith (Paris) in Paris in November 1994.

== Charts ==
=== Weekly charts ===
Chart (1994)	Peak position
Europe	95
Italy	9

=== Year-end charts ===
Chart (1994)	Peak position
Italy	34
