= I'd Fly =

English-language version of Richard Cocciante's French song "Pour elle"

Song by Richard Cocciante featuring Francesca Bellenis

from the album Un uomo felice
- Published: Boventoon; Noa Noa Music
- Released: 1994
- Length: 5:13
- Label: Sony Italy
- Composer: Richard Cocciante
- Lyricists: Jean-Paul Dreau; French lyrics; Roxanne Seeman; English lyrics
- Producer: Richard Cocciante

Music video
- "I'd Fly" - Riccardo Cocciante feat Francesca Bellenis on YouTube

"Pour elle"

Single by Richard Cocciante

from the album Empreinte
- B-side: "Flagrant désir"
- Published: Boventoon; SonyATV Music
- Released: 1993
- Label: TriStar
- Composer: Richard Cocciante
- Lyricist: Jean-Paul Dreau
- Producer: Richard Cocciante

Music video
- "Pour Elle" (Per Lei) - Richard Cocciante on YouTube

Per lei

Studio album by Riccardo Cocciante
- Released: 1995
- Genres: Rock; blues
- Languages: Italian; English
- Labels: Grupo Globo; Polydor

"I'd Fly" is a song recorded in 1994 by French-Italian singer Richard Cocciante with Francesca Bellenis. It is set to the music of Cocciante's French song "Pour elle", written by himself and Jean-Paul Dréau and released by Cocciante in 1993. Its English lyrics were written by Roxanne Seeman and are unrelated to the original French-language song.

"I'd Fly" was released on Cocciante's album Un uomo felice, released by Virgin Italy in 1994. The album reached top ten sales in Europe, and in 1995 songs from Un uomo felice including "I'd Fly" charted on the Music & Media Charts Airplay, listing the most aired songs for Europe's leading radio markets.

== Pour elle ==
"Pour elle" is the original French song by Richard Cocciante written by Cocciante and Dreau. In 1993, "Pour elle" appeared on Cocciante's albums Empreinte (for the French-language market), Eventi e mutamenti (for the Italian-language market), and Inventos y Experimentos (for the Spanish-language market). It is the second track from Empreinte album and was issued as a single and charted in France.

The song was recorded by Cocciante in French as "Pour elle", in Italian as "Per lei" and in Spanish as "Por ella", and charted in several territories. "Pour elle" entered the French chart on February 10, 1993 and reached number 45. The song is the title track of Cocciante's album Per lei, released released in Brazil by Globo/Polydor in 1995.

=== Critical reception ===
Music & Media praised Empreinte writing "... Cocciante has developed a career on both sides of the Alps. His powerful voice has not weakened and the set of songs…are vintage Cocciante...Already charted in France, this Franco-Italian effort should cross borders."

=== Personnel ===
- Richard Cocciante – composer, producer, arranger, vocals
- Leonardo de Amicis – arranger, keyboards, piano, programming
- Francesco Puglisi – bass
- Maurizio Dei Lazzaretti – drums
- Paolo Carta – guitar
- Fabio Patrignani, Fabio Venturi – recorded by

== Paul De Leeuw version ==
"Voorbij"

Single by Paul de Leeuw

from the album Paracdmol
- Language: Dutch
- B-side: "Ik ben zo blij dat ik een vrouw ben"
- Released: 1994
- Length: 4:35
- Label: Brommerpech BV
- Songwriters: Richard Cocciante; Jean-Paul Dreau; Paul De Leeuw (Dutch lyrics)

Paul de Leeuw singles chronology
"Ik wil niet dat je liegt" (1993)	"Voorbij" (1994)	"Wacht nog wat-geef wel een teken" (1994)

Music video
- "Voorbij" - Paul De Leeuw on YouTube

A Dutch version, "Voorbij", was released by Paul de Leeuw. The Dutch lyrics, written by de Leeuw himself, are unrelated to the original French-language lyrics. "Voorbij" reached No. 2 on the Dutch Top 40 and the national hit parade Top 50, and remained on the Dutch charts for 12 weeks. "Voorbij" was often heard at funerals.

== Diane Schuur versions ==
"I'd Fly"

Song by Diane Schuur

from the album Friends for Schuur
- Published: Noa Noa Music; Boventoon
- Released: 2000
- Studio: Ocean Way Recording, Hollywood, California
- Length: 5:07
- Label: Concord
- Composer: Richard Cocciante
- Lyricists: Jean-Paul Dreau; French lyrics; Roxanne Seeman; English lyrics
- Producer: Phil Ramone

Music video
- "I'd Fly" - Diane Schuur with Richard Cocciante on YouTube

"I'd Fly" was recorded in 1999 by Diane Schuur on Atlantic Records produced by Ahmet Ertegun, Shane Keister, and Yves Beauvais during the recording sessions for Music Is My Life. It was decided that "I'd Fly", an original French song, would not fit into an album of songs from the American Songbook, so it was not included in the album release. When Schuur was making her next album for Concord Records, she played "I'd Fly" for Phil Ramone. With Ahmet Ertegun's approval, Schuur released "I'd Fly" on her Friends for Schuur album.

July 15, 2021, Rhino Atlantic digitally released Diane Schuur's original recording of "I'd Fly".

=== Phil Ramone production ===
==== Personnel and production ====
The tracking session took place at Ocean Way Recording in Hollywood with Phil Ramone producing. Richard Cocciante recorded his guest vocal for "I'd Fly" in London.

- Diane Schuur – vocals
- Richard Cocciante – vocals
- Alan Broadbent – piano, arranger
- James Hughart – bass (acoustic)
- Gregg Field – drums
- Michael Thompson – guitar
- Randy Waldman - synthesizer
- Paulinho da Costa - percussion
- Phil Ramone – producer

==== Critical reception ====
Paula Edelstein of Allmusic wrote "I'd Fly" is a definite smooth jazz hit. She sings its sexy, but beautifully contoured melody, romantic lyrics with such yearning and passion that this late-night romantic ballad should land solidly on the charts.

=== Ahmet Ertegun with Shane Keister production ===
==== Personnel ====
- Diane Schuur – vocals
- Alan Broadbent – piano, arranger
- John Patitucci– bass
- Gregg Field – drums
- Dean Parks – guitar
- Emil Richards - percussion
- Ahmet Ertegun – producer
- Shane Keister – producer

== Other versions ==
In the mid-1990s, Patricia Kaas recorded a version of "I'd Fly" during recording sessions produced by Joel Dorn and his son Adam Dorn for an album that was ultimately not released.
