= Marco Luberti =

Italian composer

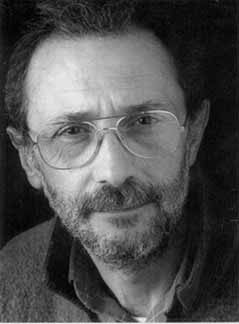
- Born: 13 February 1941 (age 84); Rome, Italy
- Occupation(s): Lyricist; Producer

Marco Luberti (born 13 February 1941) is an Italian lyricist, record producer and singer-songwriter.

== Life and career ==
Born in Rome, after graduating from the liceo artistico Luberti started studying piano and performing as a keyboardist in a number of beat groups. In the late 1960s he started a fruitful collaboration with Riccardo Cocciante, first co-writing songs for other artists, and in the 1970s, when Cocciante started his solo career, serving as his lyricist and producer. Luberti's works include Cocciante's hits "Bella senz'anima", "Margherita", "Io canto", "Quando finisce un amore" and "Poesia". The collaboration ended in 1980.

In 1982 Luberti released is only work as singer-songwriter, the album Canzoni ed appunti, which while being well received by critics was a commercial failure. He then focused on his work as producer and lyricist for other artists. His collaborations include Mina, Ornella Vanoni, Mia Martini, Loredana Bertè, Marcella Bella, Mecano, Patty Pravo, Anna Oxa, Fiorella Mannoia, Enzo Carella and his wife Marina Arcangeli (both in her solo ventures and in some works of her group, Schola Cantorum).
