= Gianni Mazza =

Italian composer

- Born: 5 October 1944 (age 81); Rome, Kingdom of taly
- Occupations: Composer, conductor, arranger

Giovanni "Gianni" Mazza (born 5 October 1944) is an Italian composer, conductor, arranger, singer and television personality.

== Career ==
Born in Rome, Mazza started his career as a musician in the late 1960s. In the 1970s he started composing film and television scores and participated as conductor at the Sanremo Music Festival in 1974 and in 1979. In the 1980s he became a popular television personality thanks to the participation as a conductor and a showman to some variety shows written and hosted by Renzo Arbore. In 1991 he entered the competition at the Sanremo Music Festival as a singer with the comedy song "Il lazzo".
