= Mannarino (singer) =

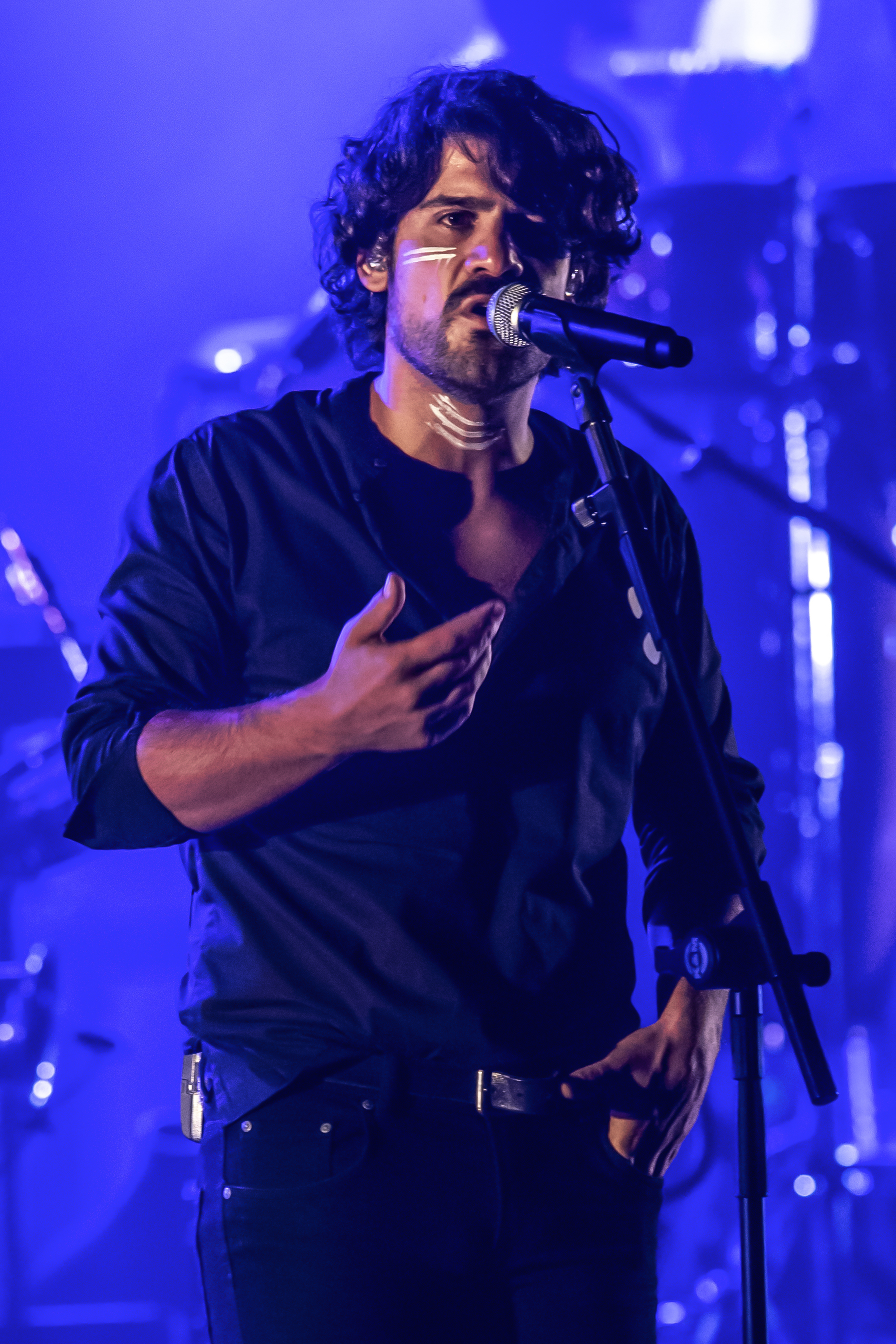
- Mannarino at Teatro degli Arcimboldi in Milan on 5 April 2018

Background information
- Born: 23 August 1979 (age 47); Rome, Italy
- Genres: Pop, folk
- Occupation: Singer-songwriter
- Years active: 2009–present
- Label: Universal Music Italia
- Website: alessandromannarino.it

Alessandro Mannarino (born 23 August 1979), simply known mononymously as Mannarino, is an Italian singer-songwriter.

== Biography ==
Alessandro Mannarino started his artistic activity in 2001, performing in the famous Monti district, in Rome, with original shows that mixed DJ music with acoustic sets.

In 2006 started a six piece group "Kampina", with which he exhibited in the most popular localities of the capital. He soon developed theatrical collaborations, including the show "Roma di note" with his actor/author friend Massimiliano Bruno, and extra musical collaborations with artists such as Ascanio Celestini, David Riondino and Don Pasta.

He was invited in many radio broadcasts, such as Fiorello's Viva Radio 2, and he was a guest of reviews such as Repubblica Roma Rock at Rome's Auditorium Parco della Musica.

On the stage of Ambra Jovinelli's Theatre whilst working in the Massimiliano Bruno's show "Agostino, tutti contro tutti", he was seen by Serena Dandini, an Italian TV host and was offered three consecutive seasons of "Parla con me", a TV show of Rai 3. In 2009 Mannarino wrote Radio 2's theme song Vasco de Gama.

=== Bar della Rabbia (2009) ===
On 20 March 2009 he released his first album Bar della Rabbia (released by Leave Music and distributed by Universal Music) and the recording project won the prestigious Giorgio Gaber Award. His record reached the final for the Targa Tenco 2009 award as "Best debut album – Opera prima" and on 13 November he performed at Teatro Ariston of Sanremo.

Bar della Rabbia received blessings from the critics and public alike and it was certified "gold" from FIMI, making the artist very popular and even more with the numerous live performances on Serena Dandini's TV show "Parla con me". In the same year Mannarino made his debut at the Concerto del Primo Maggio in Rome and was also the protagonist of his first official videoclip Tevere Grand Hotel. Today his song Me so 'mbriacato is one of his most famous tracks certified "double platinum" from FIMI.

=== Supersantos (2011) ===
On 15 March 2011 Mannarino released his second album Supersantos ("gold" certification from FIMI) and he toured his new work during the summer (Supersantos Live) this was quickly followed by another tour L'ultimo giorno dell'umanità. The first two albums were released in a box set under the title Capitolo Uno, published in December 2011. In September 2011 he wrote the opening theme of Ballarò, Rai 3's talk show, singing the song in the show. He became the only musical guest in the history of the show. In 2011, for the Valerio Berruti's art installation La Rivoluzione Terrestre, Mannarino wrote Vivere la Vita, sung by a child. Vivere la Vita is still one of his most popular songs and the official video has over 4 million views on YouTube.

After his successful tour L'ultimo giorno dell'umanità, in 2012 the Roman songwriter was again on the stage of Concerto del Primo Maggio in Rome. On 13 July he was won the Best Italian Young Music Composer award from the Italian society SIAE. In the Summer of 2012 Mannarino started Supersantos Tour that sold out many Italian cities. In Rome Mannarino played for over 6.000 people. In the autumn he had his first American tour, on the context of "Hit Week Festival", and he played in the Highline Ballroom in New York City, in the Arts and Park Amphitheatre of Miami and in Montrèal's Leonardo da Vinci Theatre.

In 2013 started the tour Corde: concerto per sole chitarre, an acoustic set where Mannarino sang on stage with guitarists Fausto Mesonella, Tony Canto and Alessandro Chimienti and with Michelangelo Danzieri as sound engineer. A few months later Mannarino composed with Tony Brundo the original soundtrack for Tutti Contro Tutti (2013), directed by Rolando Ravello. The soundtrack won the Magna Grecia Film Festival.

=== Al monte (2014) ===
Mannarino's third album is "Al Monte", also produced by the independent label Leave Music and distributed by Universal Music, officially released on 13 May 2014, but the piece "Gli animali" was released on the radio and in digital stores on 11 April. After only a week it came third in the FIMI's ranking of record best sellers. The 11 May he was guest on the show "Che tempo che fa" (Rai 3) where he played the piece "Malamor". On 3 July the important tour "Al monte" began, for which the artist was accompanied by 11 people.

On 27 September 2014 he was awarded the MEI's prize PIMI as the best indie artist of the year, in Faenza, for the great success obtained by his last record "Al monte". On 31 December 2014 he participated in "Notte di Capodanno" organized by Comune di Roma Capitale at Circo Massimo with Subsonica and Daddy G. On 22 April 2015 he was assigned the "Premio Amnesty International Italia 2015", by Amnesty International Italia, for his piece "Scendi giù", considered "the best lyrics about human rights published in Italy in 2014" by a specialized jury (given during the event "Voci per la Libertà", on 19 July 2015).

On 18 June 2015 he was invited as a guest to Michele Santoro's TV show "Rosso di Sera", a special episode for public service was broadcast in the early evening on La7, in which the singer songwriter performed his piece "Scendi Giù".

On 4 July 2015 Mannarino organized a completely renewed show for the tour "Corde 2015" in which the protagonists were, once again, the strings of: guitars, contrabass, cello and violin. The tour was a public success.

=== Apriti cielo (2017) ===
The latter debuted atop the Italian Albums Chart. His four studio albums were all certified gold by the Federation of the Italian Music Industry. Three years after his third album, Mannarino released his fourth album "Apriti Cielo" (Universal) on 13 January, characterized by his evocative writing and rousing sound which made him one of the most loved singer songwriters. Before the release of the entire record a homonym piece reached the first place on Spotify's ranking of the most viral pieces.

The record debuted in the first place of Fimi's ranking of record best sellers, on Spotify it almost reached 20 million streamings. The album was certified "Disco D'Oro".

The album "Apriti Cielo" was released before the tour which debuted on 25 and 26 March for the first time at Rome's PalaLottomatica with two sold out dates and Torino, Milan and Bologna's concerts were tripled after the tickets were sold out in only a few weeks.

Mannarino's tour ended with over 100 thousand sold tickets. Numbers that represent a record for the outsider of Italian music. His first live album, Apriti Cielo Live, was released the following Autumn and only a few weeks later the concept tour "L'Impero Crollerà'" was announced, which will be performed in Italy with 20 dates starting from March 2018.

=== V (2021) ===
On 21 July 2021 Mannarino announced the release of his fifth studio album V and published "Africa", the first single from the album. On 27 August 27 "Cantaré" was released, the second single of the album which is sung in Italian and Spanish, and it was broadcast by the main Italian radio stations.

On 17 September V was released, fully produced by Alessandro Mannarino and Jacopo BRAIL Sinigaglia, with the collaboration of some international producers such as Joey Waronker, Michael H. Brauer (mix) and Joe La Porta (mastering). By the end of the following week, V reached the first place in the FIMI Ranking of the best-selling albums (vinyl) and the second place of the most-listened albums.

== Filmography ==
=== Movies ===
In 2010 he played the part of Rocco, an Italian singer who moved to Amsterdam, in the movie Tutto l'amore del mondo, distributed by Medusa. In one of the scenes he sang one of his most famous songs, "Me so 'mbriacato".
