= Giulietta e Romeo (musical) =

2007 Italian-language musical

- Opera Popolare
- Promotional art
- Music: Riccardo Cocciante
- Lyrics: Pasquale Panella
- Basis: William Shakespeare's play Romeo & Juliet
- Productions: 2007 in Verona

Giulietta e Romeo is an Italian-language musical with music by Riccardo Cocciante and lyrics by Pasquale Panella, based on William Shakespeare's play Romeo and Juliet. Since its world premiere in Verona on June 1, 2007, directed by Sergio Carrubba, the musical has toured throughout Italy, playing in various Italian cities, including Rome, Milan, Naples and others. There are plans to stage it in other European nations in the Italian language.

The cast is composed mostly of boys and girls between the ages of 15 and 18. Each actor has at least two roles.

== Plot ==
Giulietta and Romeo's young love is strongly opposed by their two families, the Capuletis and the Montecchis. Their feelings are intensely passionate, but they inevitably meet a tragic fate.

=== Changes from the Shakespeare story ===
Mercuzio is an omniscient character, who sings the overture and guides the meeting of Romeo and Giulietta during the party at Capuleti's home. The role of Tebaldo is circumscribed to the quarrels among the family clans. He has a scanty character and grazes madness. Lord Capuleti's role is expanded. The roles of Lady Capuleti and Lady Montecchi are eliminated.

Giulietta dies because of a heartbreak, instead of by the dagger. Padre Lorenzo is the character that indirectly decides the fate of Romeo and Giulietta driving them during the second act. At the end he will cry over the deaths together with the two fathers.

== Original cast ==
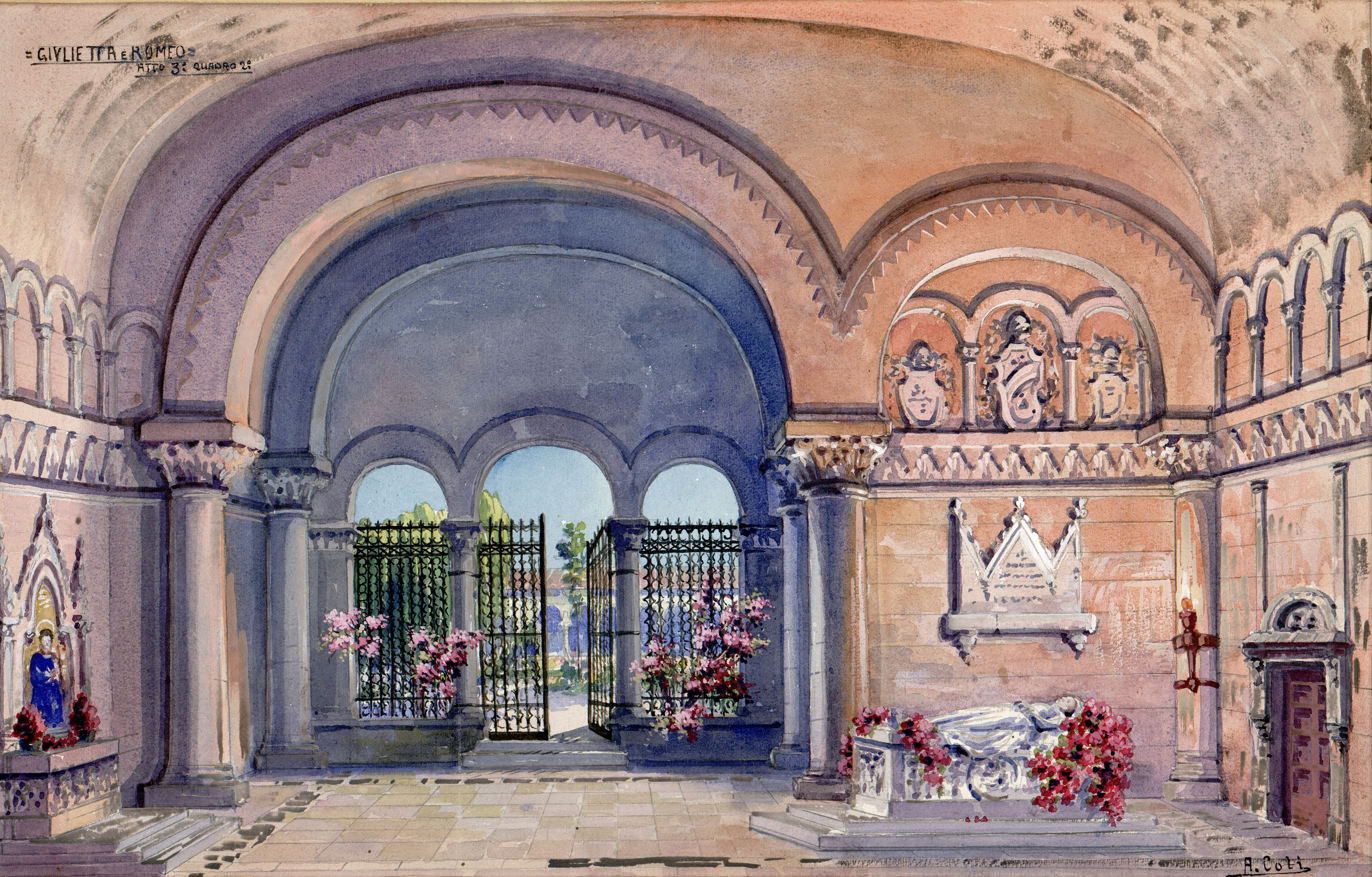
Chiostro del Convento (Cappella dei Capuleti), set design for Giulietta e Romeo act 3 scene 2 (undated)

Romeo: Marco Vito, Flavio Gismondi, Daniele Carta Mantiglia
Giulietta: Tania Tuccinardi, Alessandra Ferrari, Maria Francesca Bartolomucci
Benvolio: Angelo Del Vecchio, Damiano Borgi
Mercuzio: Gian Marco Schiaretti, Francesco Capodacqua
Tebaldo: Valerio Di Rocco, Gaetano Caruso
Lord Capuleti: Giuseppe Pellingra, Francesco Antimiani
Lord Montecchi: Francesco Antimiani, Giuseppe Pellingra
Nutrice: Silvia Querci, Chiara Luppi
Padre Lorenzo: Fabrizio Voghera, Luca Maggiore
Principe Escalus: Alessandro Arcodia, Gaetano Caruso

== Songs ==
Act I

1. Verona (Verona)
2. L'affronto (The confrontation)
3. Non l'odio, l'amore (Not hatred, but love)
4. Io amo e non so (I love and don't know)
5. Ragazze tra le stelle (Girls among the stars)
6. Stanotte ho fatto un sogno (Last night I had a dream)
7. La regina della notte (The queen of the night)
8. La festa siamo noi (We are the party)
9. La festa della festa (The party of the party)
10. La festa siamo noi (segue) (We are the party (continued))
11. Ah... quell'amore (Oh... that love)
12. La festa siamo noi (segue) (We are the party (continued))
13. C'è tutto sotto sotto (Everything lies down below)
14. Gli occhi negli occhi (Eyes that meet)
15. L'amore ha fatto l'amore (Love has made love)
16. La mano nella mano (Hand in hand)
17. T'amo (I love you)
18. Il nome del nemico (The name of the enemy)
19. Chi sei? (Who are you?)
20. Io, Romeo (I, Romeo)
21. Voglio vedere Giulietta (I want to see Giulietta)
22. Il tuo nome (Your name)
23. Notte più bella di tutte (Most beautiful night of all)
24. Giulietta esiste (Giulietta is real)
25. Tu sei (You are)
26. Maledizione benedizione (Curse and blessing)

Act II

1. L'amore è fatto già (Love is already made)
2. Nei fiori (In the flowers)
3. Io vi benedico (I bless you)
4. Mercuzio, Tebaldo, le spade (Mercuzio, Tebaldo, the swords)
5. Sono ferito (I am wounded)
6. Com'è leggera la vita (How light life is)
7. Romeo, Tebaldo, le spade (Romeo, Tebaldo, the swords)
8. Morte di Tebaldo (The death of Tebaldo)
9. No, Verona, no (No, Verona, no)
10. Lontano da Verona (Far from Verona)
11. Per rabbia e per errore (Out of anger and error)
12. La notizia a Giulietta (Giulietta hears the news)
13. Tu sei bandito (You are exiled)
14. Quel respiro, la vita (That breath, life)
15. Non è ancora giorno (It's not morning yet)
16. Morto il mio cuore (Death of my heart)
17. Giulietta, io so quanto soffri (I know how much you are suffering, Giulietta)
18. Festa presto (Celebration in a hurry)
19. E se non mi svegliassi (And what if I don't wake up?)
20. Festa presto (segue) (Celebration in a hurry (continued))
21. Bambina mia (My little girl)
22. Stanotte (Tonight)
23. Il corpo di Giulietta (Giulietta's body)
24. Morte di Romeo (The death of Romeo)
25. Il cuore (The heart)
26. Perché (Why)
