= Bella senz'anima =

Single by Riccardo Cocciante

from the album Anima
- B-side: "Qui"
- Released: 1974
- Genre: Pop
- Label: RCA Italiana
- Songwriter(s): Marco Luberti, Paolo Casella, Riccardo Cocciante

Riccardo Cocciante singles chronology
"Decisamente tu" (1973)	"Bella senz'anima" (1974)	"L'alba" (1975)

Audio
- "Bella senz'anima" on YouTube

"Bella senz'anima" is an Italian ballad song written by Marco Luberti, Paolo Casella and Riccardo Cocciante, arranged by Franco Pisano and performed by Riccardo Cocciante. It was the first single from the Cocciante's 1974 album Anima.

== Overview ==
The song was launched by Cocciante during a tour ("Racconto") he made in 1973 together with Antonello Venditti and Francesco De Gregori. Once she heard the song,Ornella Vanoni repeatedly asked Cocciante to be the one to launch the single, in a slightly adapted version to suit a female performer, eventually being turned down. The single peaked at the first place on the Italian singles chart, and it was the seventh most sold single of the year in Italy.

The lyrics, and particularly the verse "E adesso spogliati come sai fare tu" (i.e. "And now strip as you know") led to harsh criticism from several feminist organizations and to television censorship.

In 2006, Cocciante performed the song out of competition at the Sanremo Music Festival.

== Track listing ==
- 7-inch single – AN 4155

A. "Bella senz'anima" (Marco Luberti, Paolo Casella, Riccardo Cocciante)
B. "Qui" (Marco Luberti, Paolo Casella, Riccardo Cocciante)

== Other versions ==
Artists who covered the song include Johnny Hallyday (with the title "Cet homme que voilà"), Thelma Houston (as "Cruel Beauty"), Mina, Joe Arroyo, Víctor Manuelle, Oliver Dragojević, Linda Valori, Mino Reitano, Schola Cantorum.

== Charts ==
Chart (1974–75)	Peak position
Italy (Musica e dischi)	1
Spain (AFYVE)	1

== Certifications ==
Region	Certification	Certified units/sales
Italy (FIMI) Sales since 2009	Platinum	100,000^{‡}
^{‡} Sales+streaming figures based on certification alone.
