= Enzo Carella =

Italian singer-songwriter

Background information
- Born: January 8, 1952; Rome, Italy
- Died: February 21, 2017 (aged 65) Rome, Italy
- Years active: 1976–2017

Enzo Carella (8 January 1952 – 21 February 2017) was an Italian singer-songwriter. Active since 1976, his major hit is the song "Barbara", which was ranked at second place at the Sanremo Music Festival 1979.

== Discography ==
Albums

- 1977 - Vocazione (IT, ZPLT 34017)
- 1979 - Barbara e altri Carella (IT, ZPLT 34065)
- 1981 - Sfinge (RCA Italiana, PL 31600)
- 1992 - Carella de Carellis (IT 74321 104021)
- 1995 - Se non cantassi sarei nessuno (L'Odissea di Panella e Carella) (IT 74321 26789 2)
- 2004 - Enzo Carella (BMG Ricordi Flashback, raccolta, 2 cd)
- 2007 - Ahoh Ye Nànà (Sony BMG)

Singles

- 1976 - "Fosse vero"/"Si rivede ragazza" (IT, ZT 7066)
- 1977 - "Malamore"/"L'anima pagliacciona" (IT, ZBT 7077)
- 1978 - "Amara"/"Carmè" (IT, ZBT 7094)
- 1979 - "Barbara"/"Veleno" (IT, ZBT 7127) Festival di Sanremo 1979
- 1981 - "Sfinge"/"Si, si può" (RCA Italiana PB 6540)
