= Riccardo Cocciante =

Italian-French singer and songwriter (born 1946)

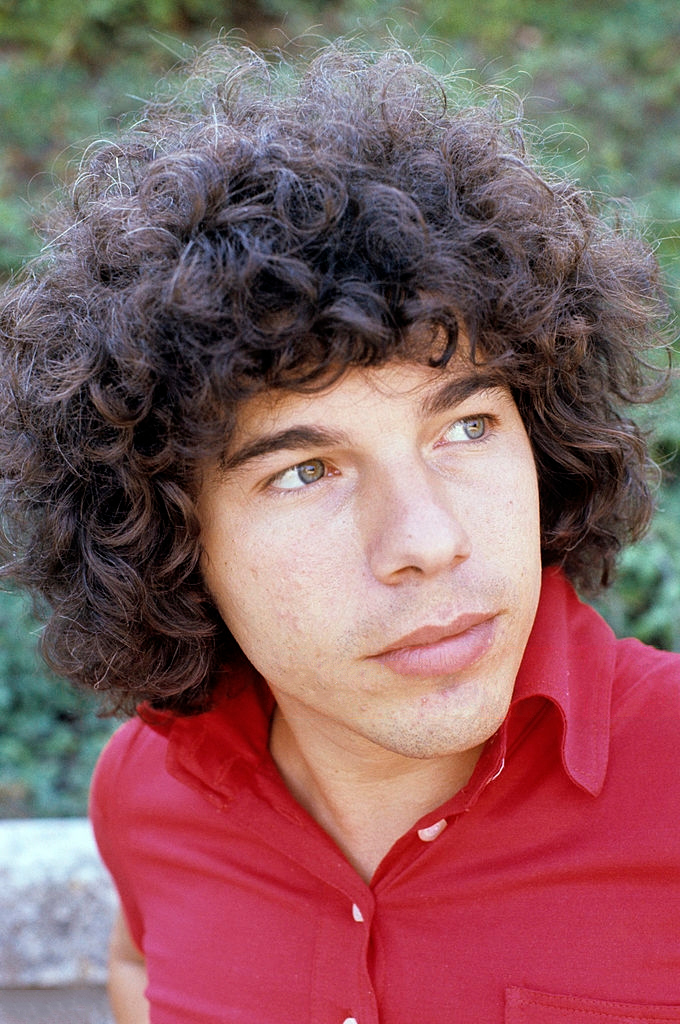
- Cocciante in 1974

Background information
- Also known as: Richard Cocciante
- Born: 20 February 1946 (age 80); Saigon, French Indochina (now Ho Chi Minh, Vietnam)
- Genres: Pop; chanson; pop rock
- Occupations: Singer; songwriter; composer
- Instruments: Vocals; piano
- Years active: 1968–present
- Labels: RCA Talent; Delta; RCA Italiana; Virgin Dischi; 20th Century; Ri-Fi
- Spouse: Catherine Boutet (m. 1983)
- Website: coccianteclub.it

Riccardo Cocciante (Italian: [rikˈkardo kotˈtʃante]; born 20 February 1946), also known in French-speaking countries and English-speaking countries as Richard Cocciante (French: [ʁiʃaʁ kɔʃjɑ̃t]), is an Italian and French singer and songwriter. His work includes recordings in Italian, French, English and Spanish.

== Early and personal life ==
Cocciante was born on 20 February 1946 in Saigon, French Indochina (now Ho Chi Minh, Vietnam), to an Italian father from Rocca di Mezzo, L'Aquila, and a French mother. At the age of 11, he moved to Rome, Italy, where he attended the Lycée français Chateaubriand. He has also lived in France, the United States, and Ireland.

Cocciante has been married to Catherine Boutet since 1983. They have one child together.

== Career ==
An R&B enthusiast, Cocciante began his musical career as an organ player, and in the late 1960s began performing as a singer at L'Approdo, a Roman club for foreign students. After forming the band GL6 with Marco Luberti and Paolo Casella, in 1971 he started his professional career with the French name Richard Cocciante and recorded three English language songs for the soundtrack of the Carlo Lizzani's film Roma Bene. In 1972, he released his first album, titled MU in Italy and Atlantì in France.

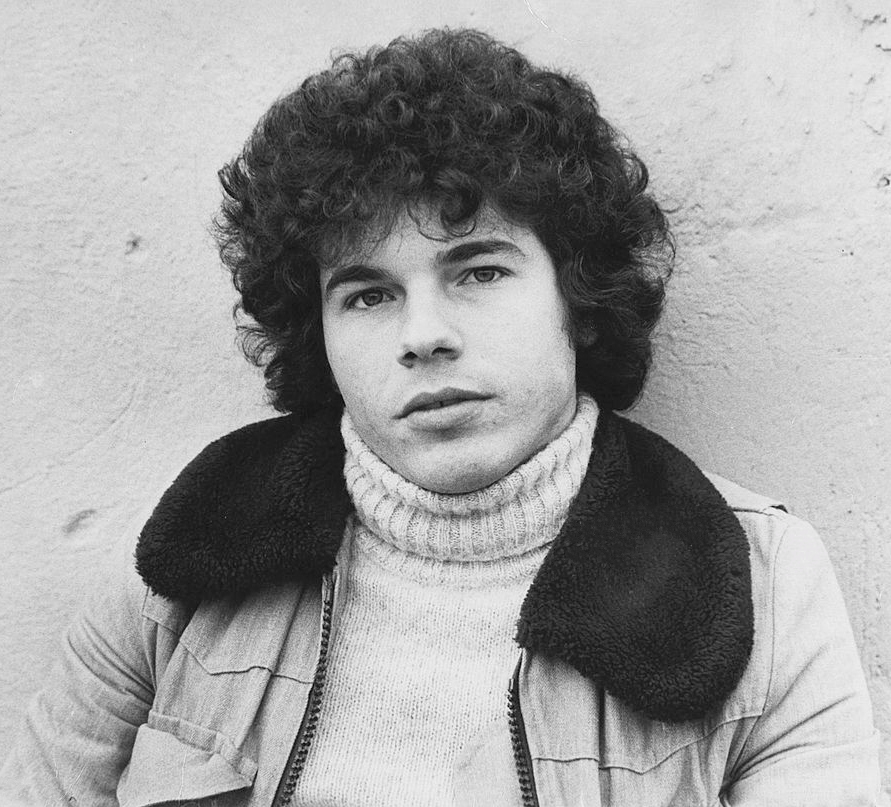
Cocciante in 1975

After the fair commercial results of his 1973 album Poesia, Cocciante had his breakout one year later with "Bella senz'anima", which became a major hit, but was also controversial, being considered sexist and was censored on Italian television. In 1976, he got another number one spot on the Italian hit parade with "Margherita", his signature song. The same year, he covered the Beatles song "Michelle", featuring the London Symphony Orchestra, for the musical documentary All This and World War II, and he released his sole English album in the US, with the single "When Love Has Gone Away" peaking at No. 41 on the Billboard Hot 100.

In 1980, Cocciante began a decade-long collaboration with the lyricist Mogol, who had just stopped his professional association with Lucio Battisti; their first hit was "Cervo a primavera". In 1983, Cocciante was the first Italian artist to be signed to Virgin Records, andreleased his album "Sincerità", produced and arranged by the American composer James Newton Howard. Following several more hits, notably the 1985 duet with Mina "Questione di feeling", in 1987 he moved to Florida, and except for a live album he took a long artistic break.

Cocciante made his comeback in 1991, winning the 41st edition of the Sanremo Music Festival with the song "Se stiamo insieme", and getting a significant success with both the single and the following album Cocciante. In 1994, he recorded an English-language version of his hit song "Pour elle" as a duet with Francesca Bellenis, under the title "I'd Fly", and included it in his album Un Uomo Felice; a Spanish version "Por ella" and an Italian version "Per lei" were also recorded. In 1996, Cocciante was chosen as the singer for the Italian versions of the songs in the Toy Story movie, singing "Un amico in me", "Che strane cose" and "Io non volerò più". In 1997, his friend Plácido Domingo invited him to sing at Domingo's annual Christmas in Vienna concert, together with Sarah Brightman and Helmut Lotti.

In 1998, Cocciante composed Notre-Dame de Paris, a musical adaptation of Victor Hugo's The Hunchback of Notre-Dame; the musical, with lyrics by Luc Plamondon in its French version and by Pasquale Panella in its Italian version, proved to be a worldwide success, and the relevant CDs sold about 10 million copies. Other two successful musicals followed: Le Petit Prince, and Giulietta e Romeo. He also made a Chinese-language adaptation of Giacomo Puccini's opera Turandot, which was directed by Zhang Yimou.

In 2013, Cocciante was a coach for the first season of The Voice of Italy; Elhaida Dani, one of the contestants he coached, won the show.

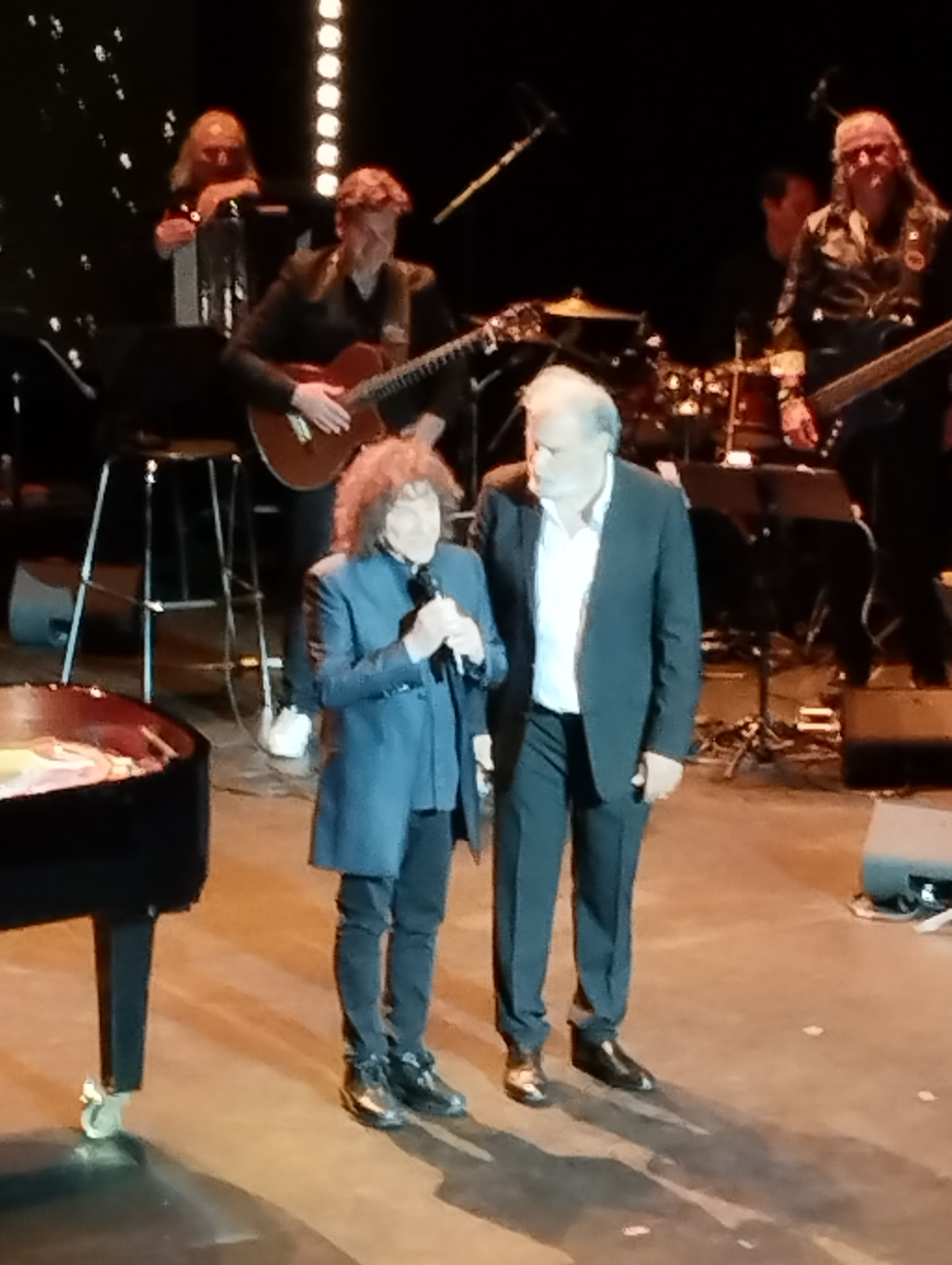
Cocciante with Raphaël Mezrahi in October 2025

It was announced that Cocciante is scheduled to perform a retrospective of his career at the Lucca Summer Festival July 2025.

== Discography ==
- Mu (1972)
- Poesia (1973)
- Anima (1974)
- L'alba (1975)
- Richard Cocciante [English version of Anima] (1976)
- Concerto per Margherita (1976)
- Riccardo Cocciante (1978)
- ...E io canto (1979)
- Cervo a primavera (1980)
- Q Concert (1981)
- Cocciante (1982)
- Sincerità (1983)
- Il mare dei papaveri (1985)
- Quando si vuole bene (1986)
- La grande avventura (1988)
- Viva! (1988)
- Cocciante (also known as Se stiamo insieme; 1991)
- Empreinte (1993)
- Eventi e mutamenti (1993)
- Il mio nome è Riccardo (1994)
- Un uomo felice (1994)
- Je chante (1995)
- Innamorato (1997)
- Istantanea (1998)
- Notre-Dame de Paris live Arena di Verona (2002)
- Songs (2005)

== Musicals ==
- Notre-Dame de Paris (1997; lyrics by Luc Plamondon)
- Le Petit Prince (2002; lyrics by Élisabeth Anaïs)
- Giulietta e Romeo (2007; lyrics by Pasquale Panella)

Awards and achievements
Preceded by Pooh with "Uomini soli"	Sanremo Music Festival; Winner; 1991	Succeeded by Luca Barbarossa with "Portami a ballare"
