= List of songs recorded by Thalía =

List of recorded songs by Mexican artist Gloria Trevi

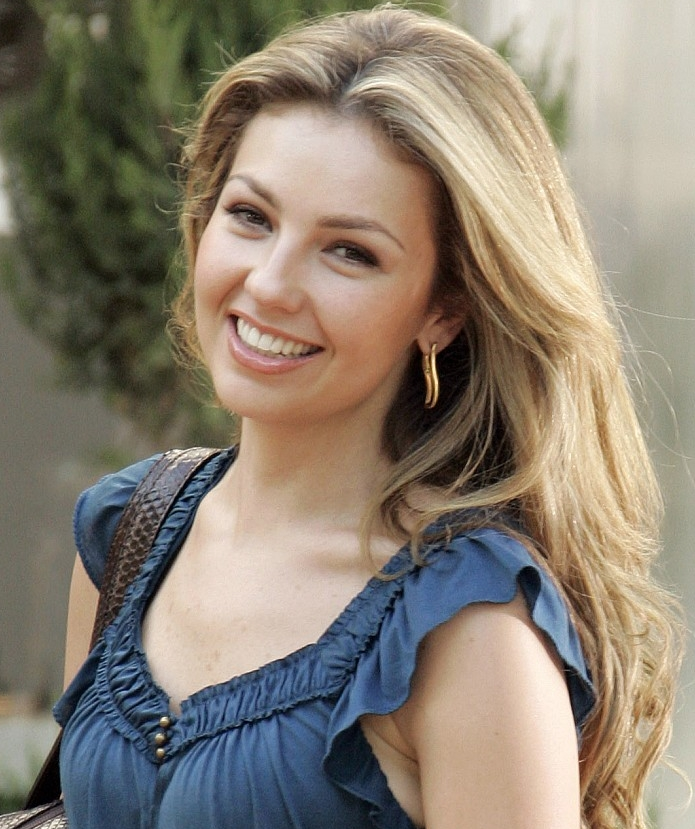
Thalía in 2006.

Thalia is a Mexican singer and actress who rose to fame in the 1980s after becoming part of the pop band Timbiriche. With the band she recorded four studio albums until her departure to pursue a solo career. In 1990 she released her first self-titled album Thalía, followed by two more albums under the same recording contract with Melody. In 1995 she released her first album with EMI Music, En Éxtasis, followed by six more records, ending their contract with Lunada in 2008. In 2009 she released the live album Primera Fila, this time under Sony Music, with whom she's released nine studio albums to date. Besides her musical career, she's also starred on seven soap operas, singing the opening theme of most of them, particularly María Mercedes (1992), Marimar (1994), María la del Barrio (1995) and Rosalinda (1999). Overall, she's recorded over 300 songs in various languages including Spanish, English, Portuguese, French and Tagalog, and she has co-written around 160 of them.

== Songs ==
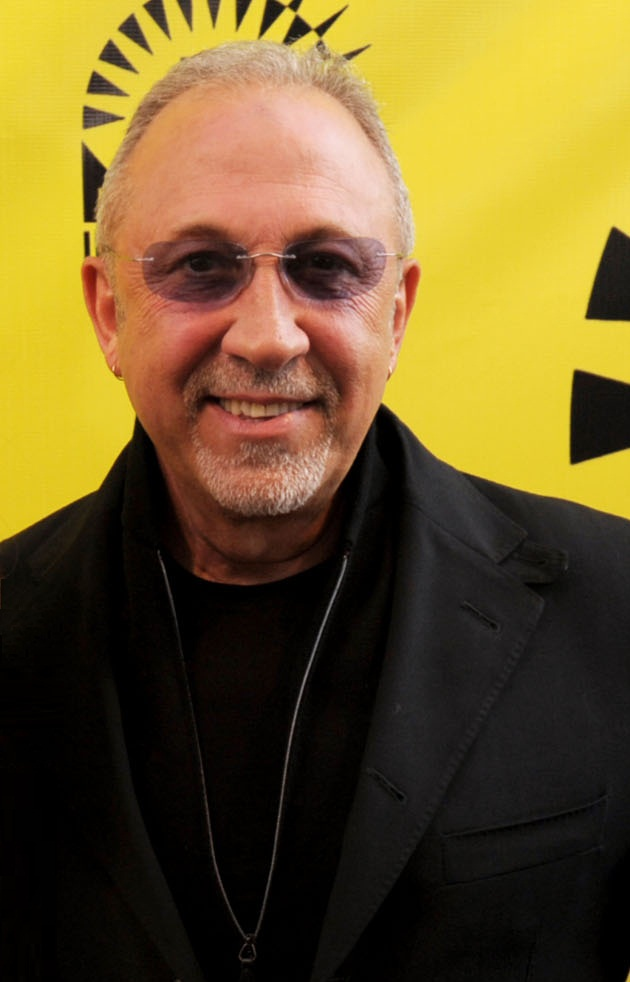
Emilio Estefan has been a frequent collaborator of Thalía throughout the years.

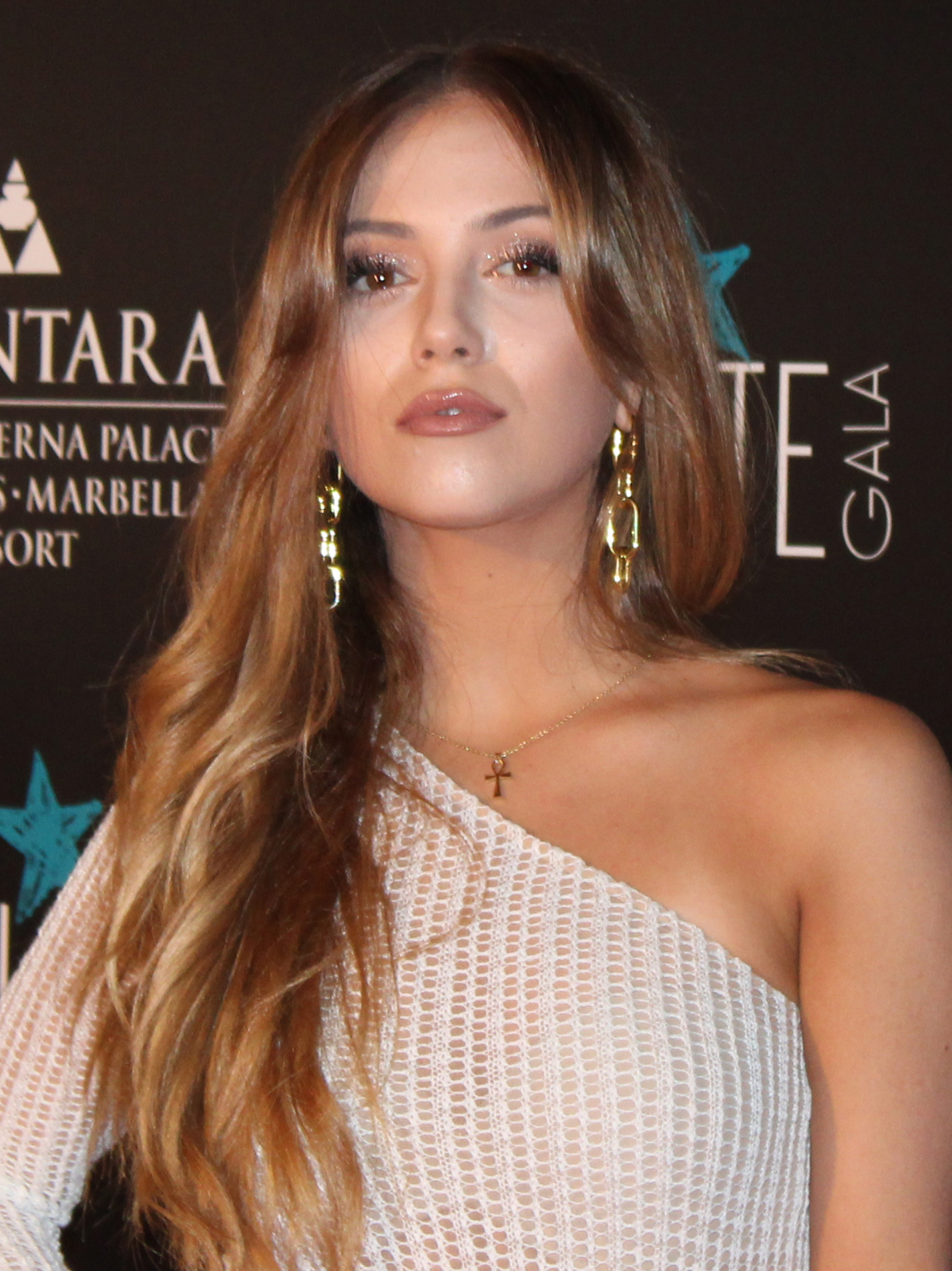
Ana Mena collaborated with Thalía on the 2018 track "Ahí".

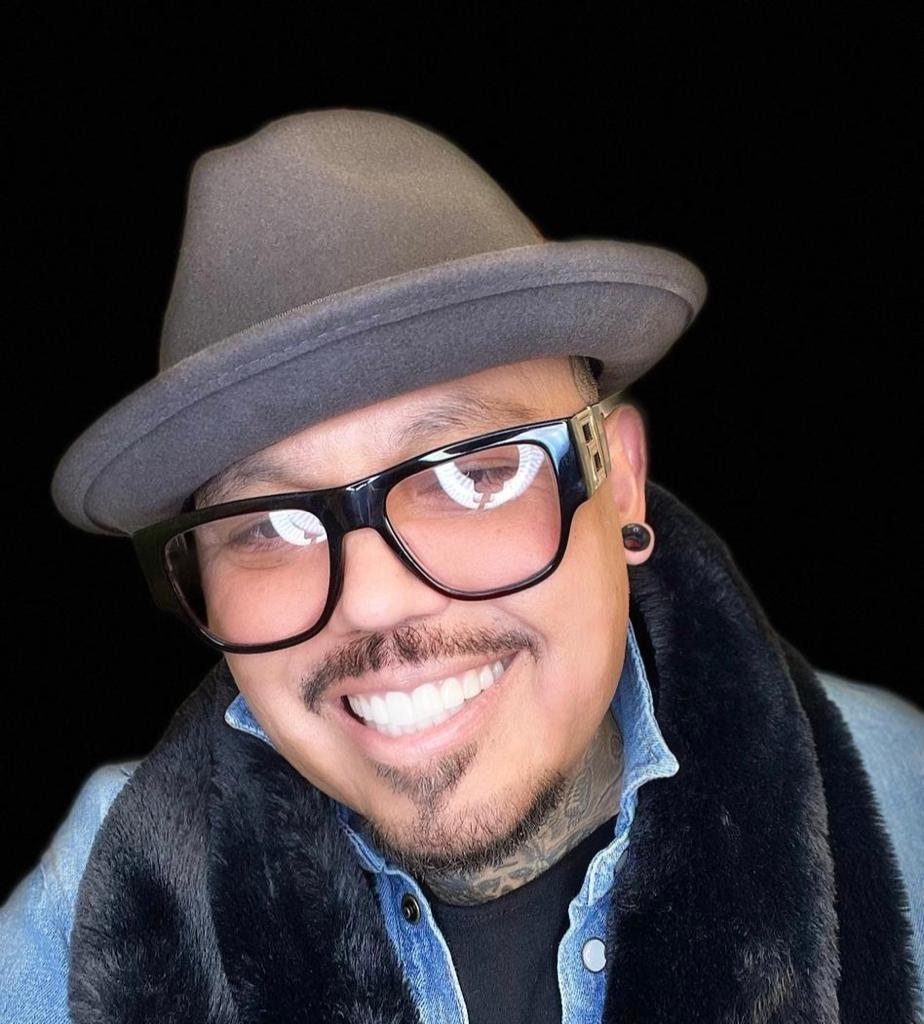
A.B. Quintanilla has collaborated in some songs for Thalía.

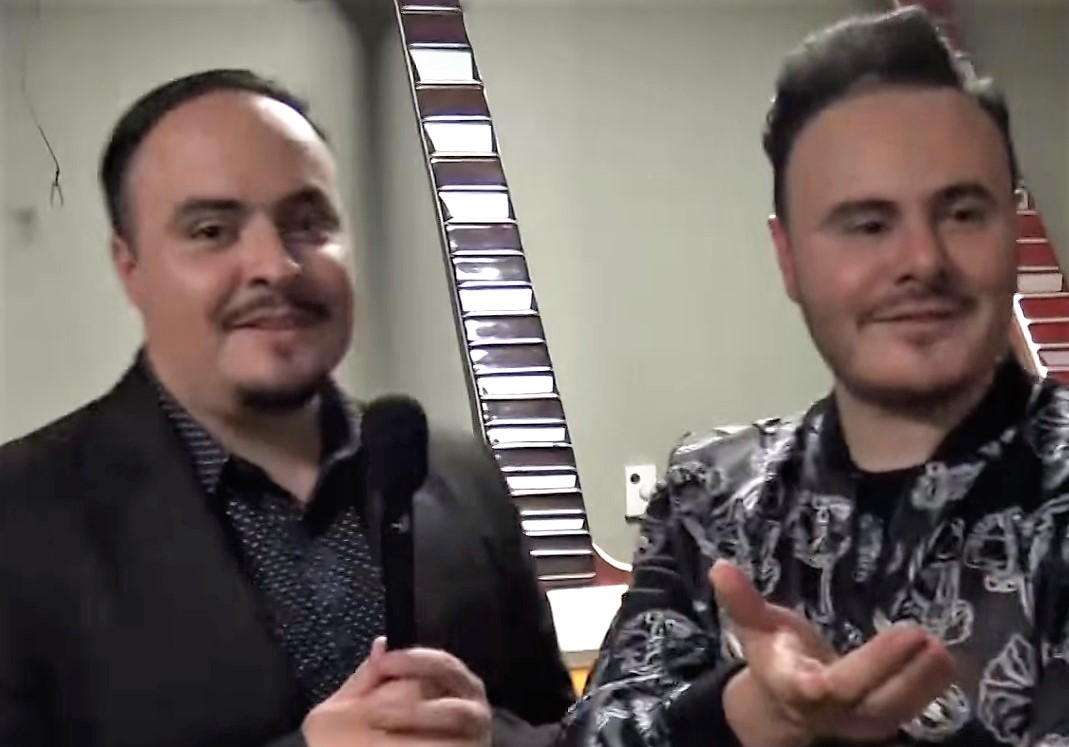
Río Roma invited Thalía to their 2020 single "Lo Siento Mucho". José Luis Roma has also written multiple songs for her.

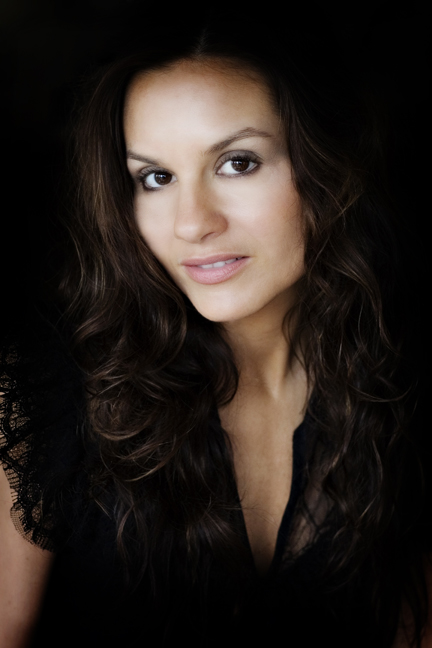
Kara DioGuardi co-wrote some of Thalía's English songs.

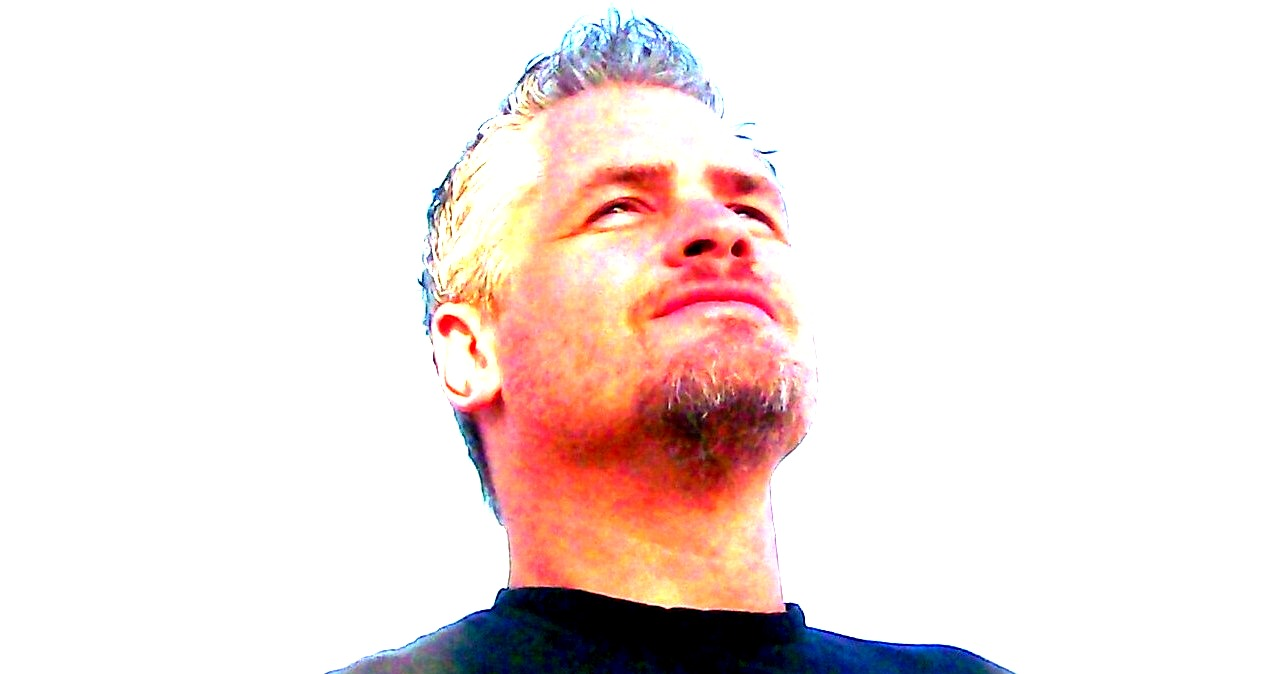
Lawrence Dermer has co-written several songs for Thalía.

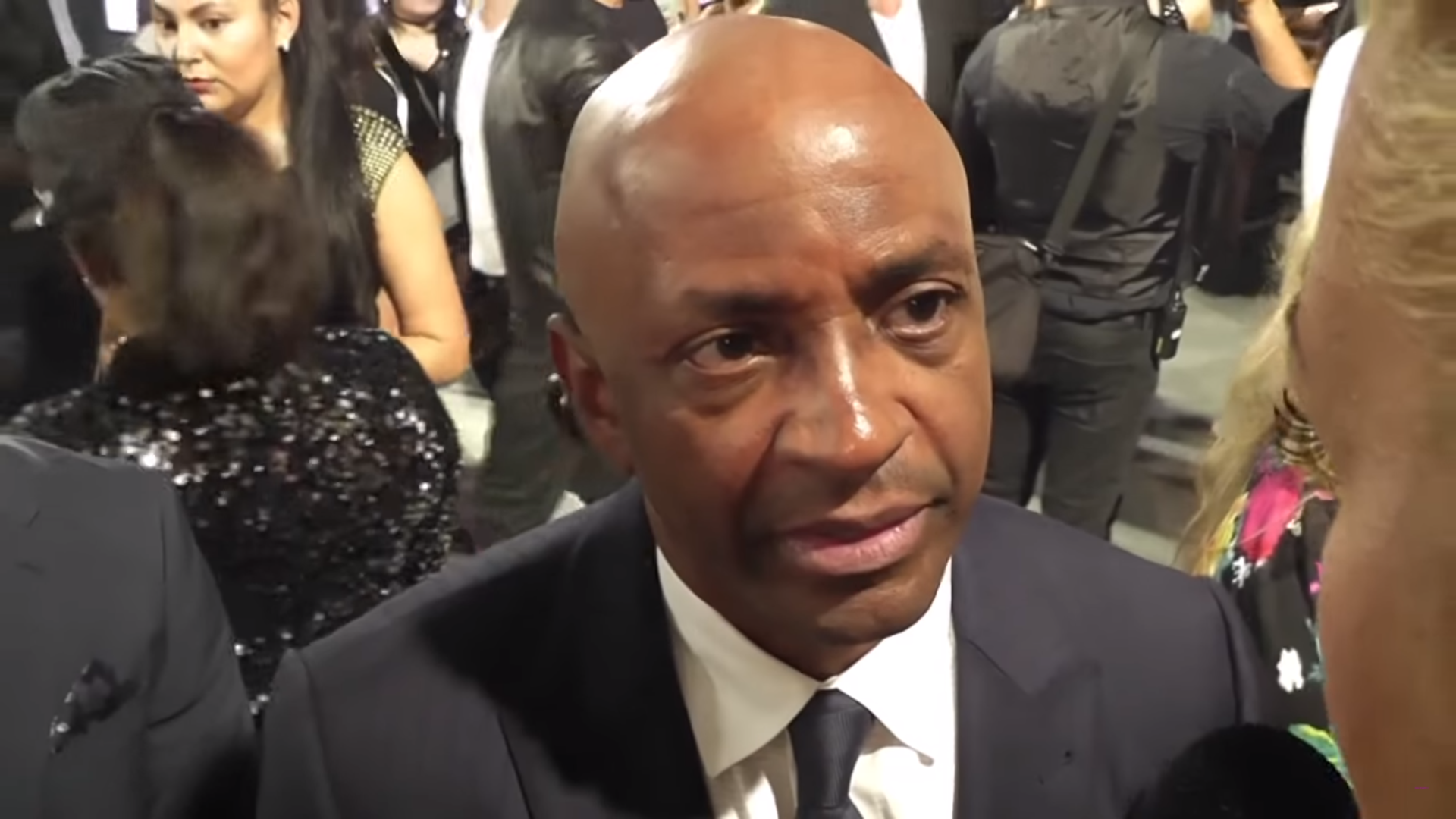
Sergio George has worked with Thalía in multiple projects since 2016.

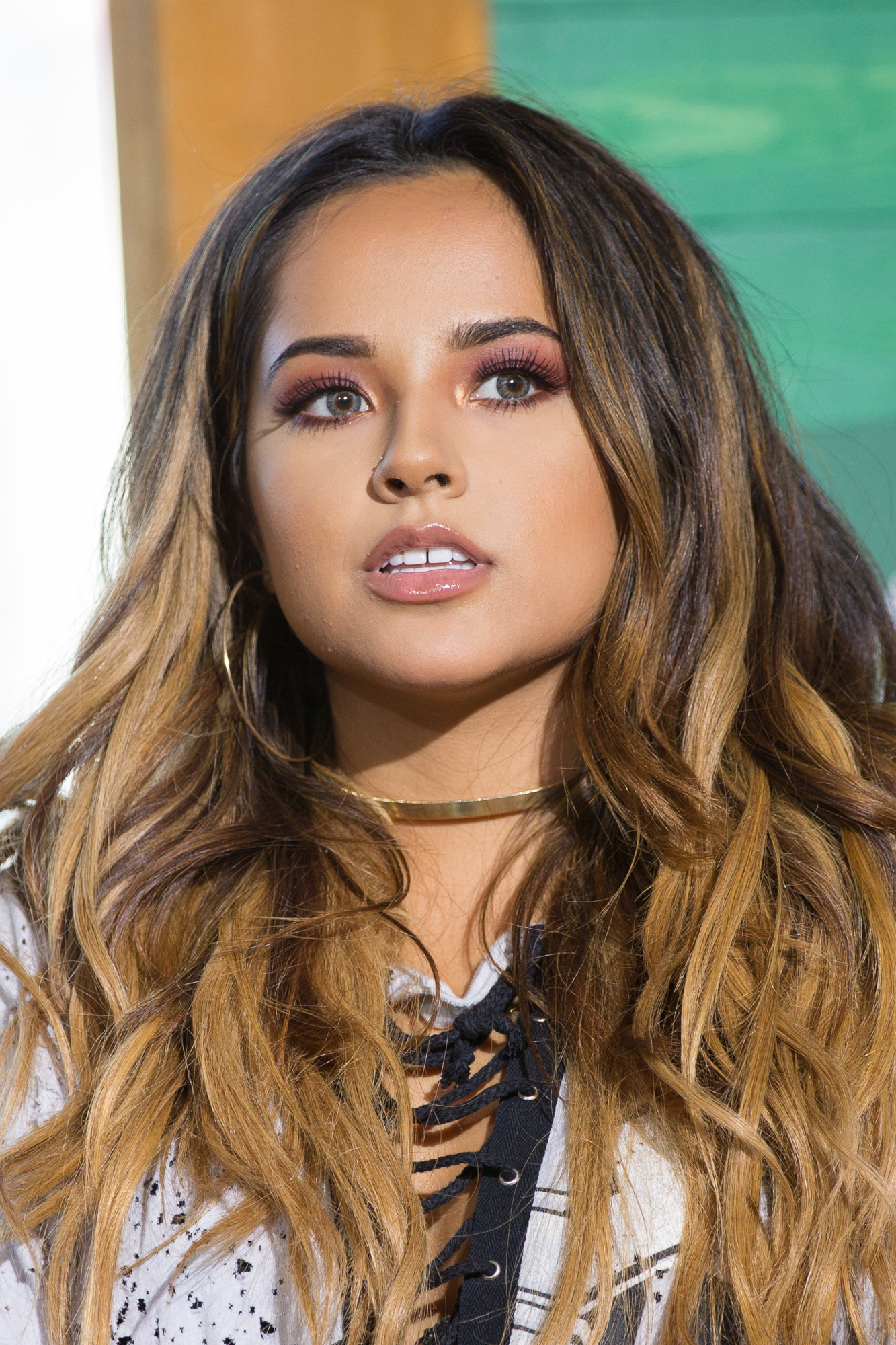
Thalía has worked with Becky G on the singles "Como Tú No Hay Dos" and "Baila Así".

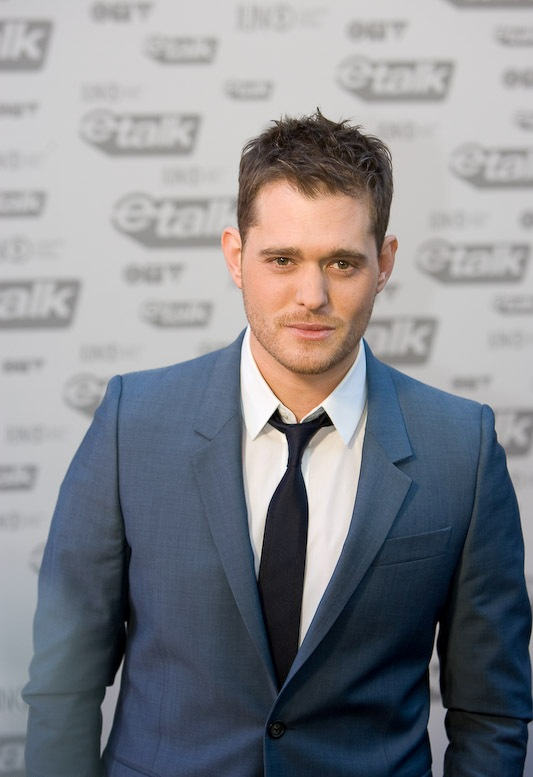
Thalía and Michael Bublé have worked on each other's records.

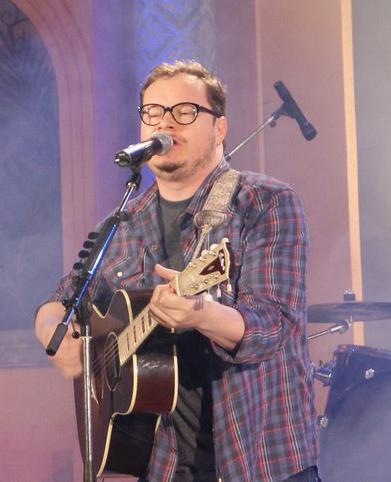
Thalía and Leonel García have worked together in multiple songs.

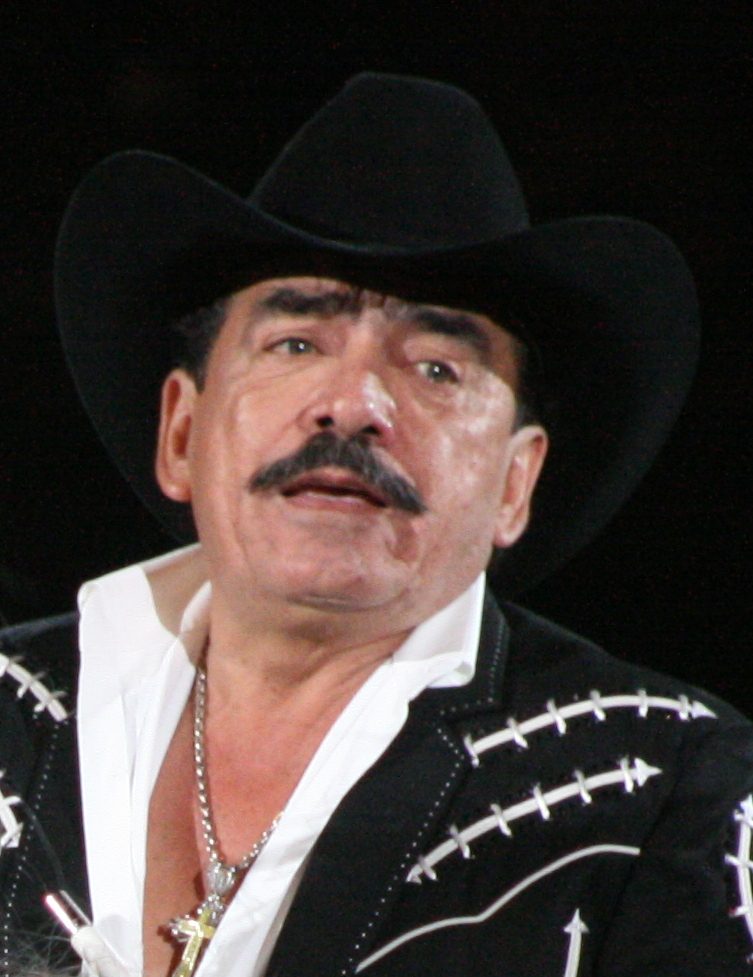
Thalía featured Joan Sebastian on the track "Con la Duda" from her live album "Primera Fila" in 2009.

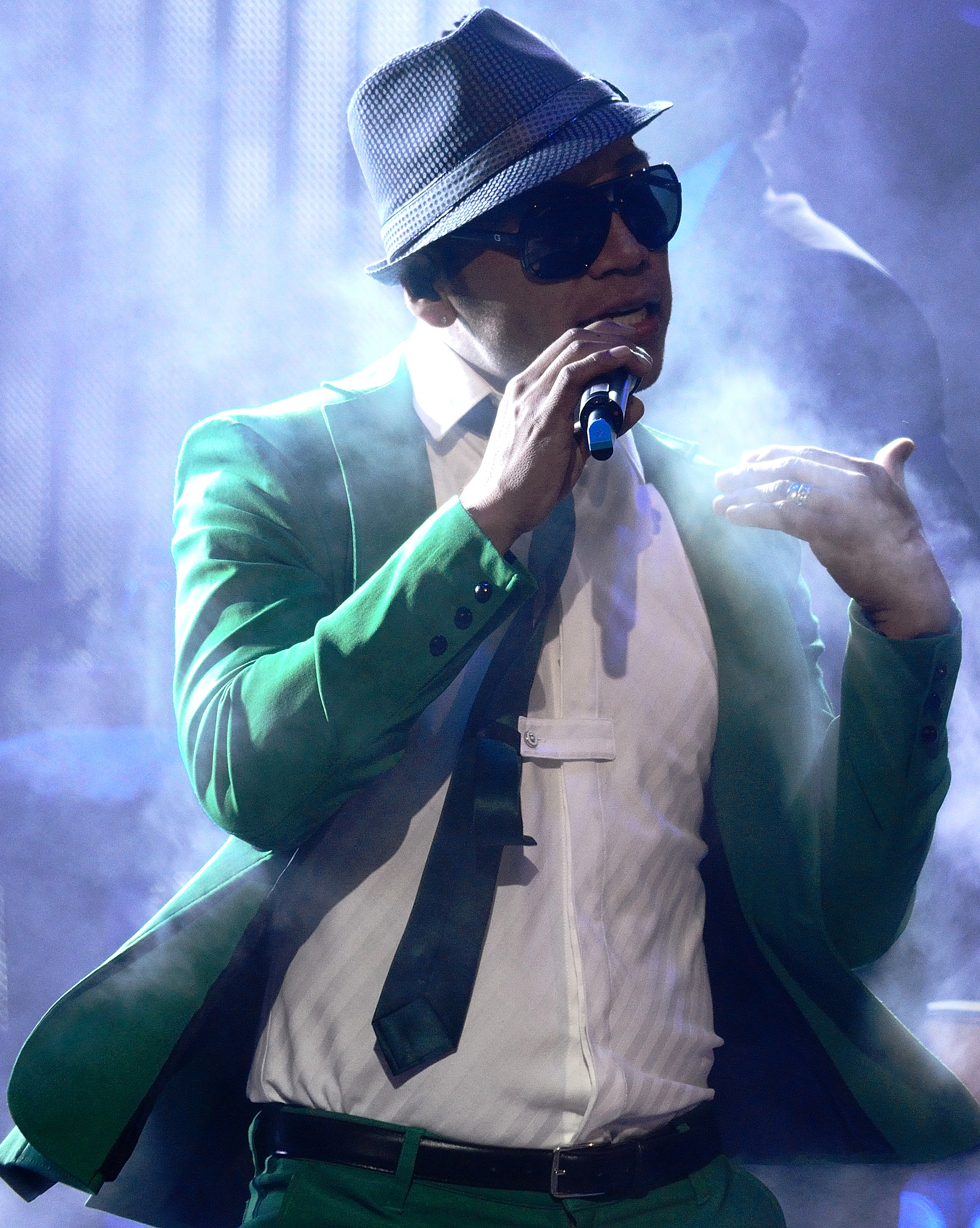
Samo worked with Thalía on "Con los Años Que Me Quedan" as well as other songs he co-wrote for her.

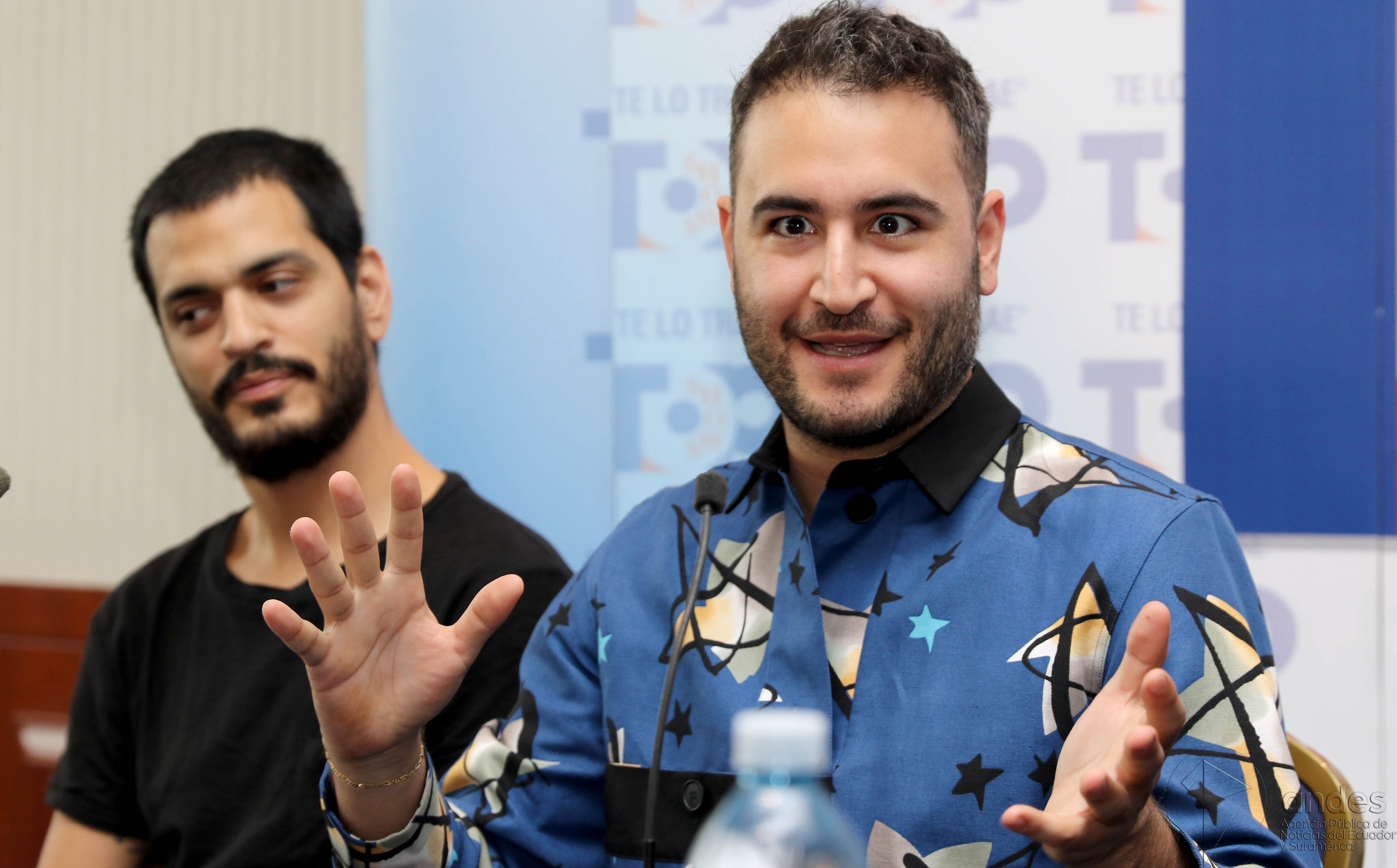
Jesús Navarro from Reik was featured on "Con los Años Que Me Quedan" in 2012.

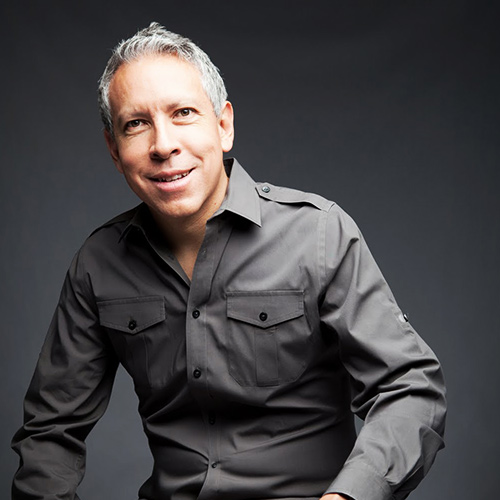
Thalía covered some of the Christian songs by Marco Barrientos in 2021.

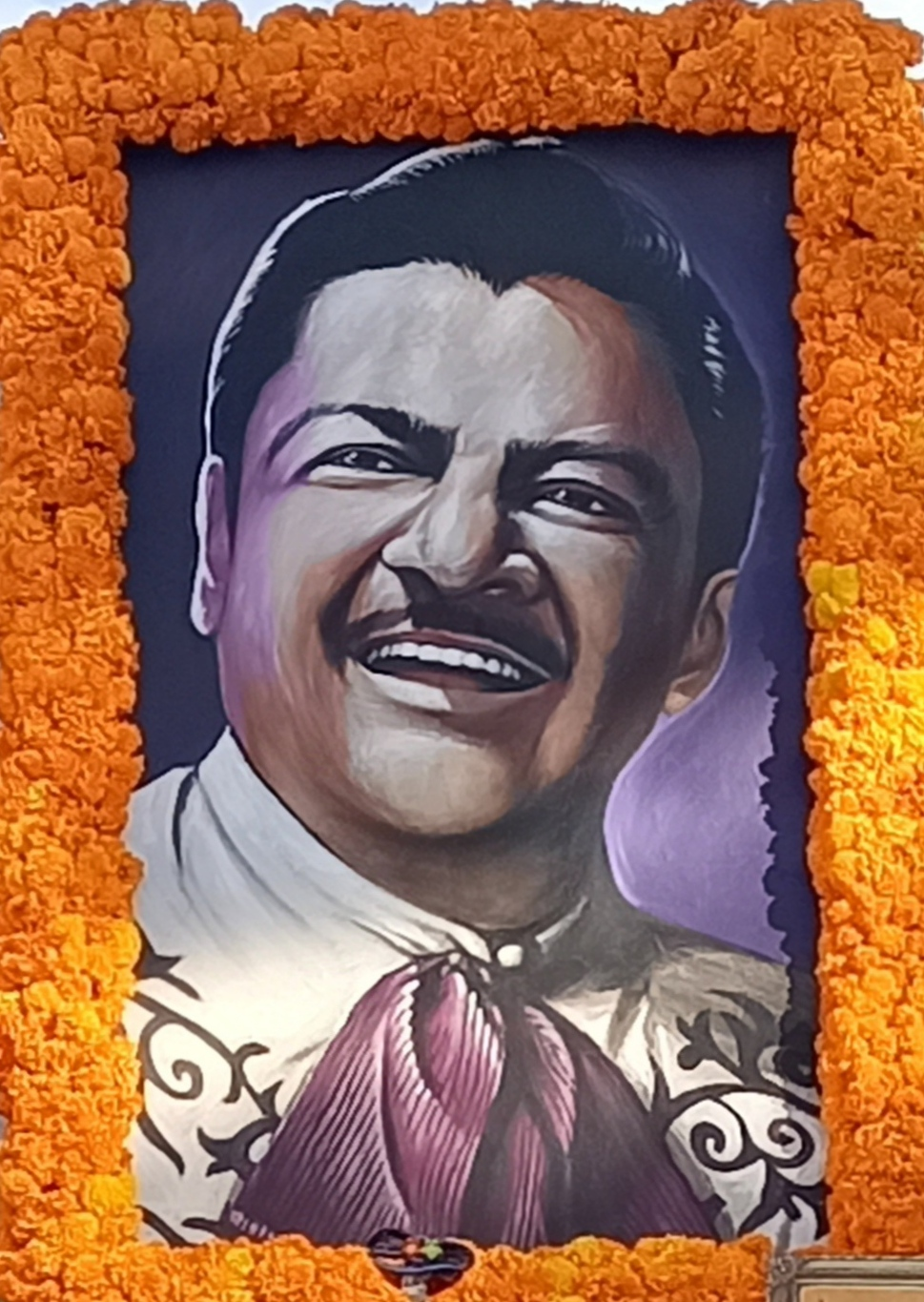
Thalía was part of the tribute to José Alfredo Jiménez in 1998.

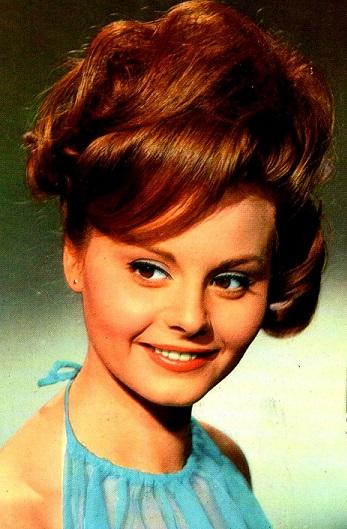
Thalía participated on Rocío Dúrcal's posthumous album "Una Estrella en el Cielo" in 2010.

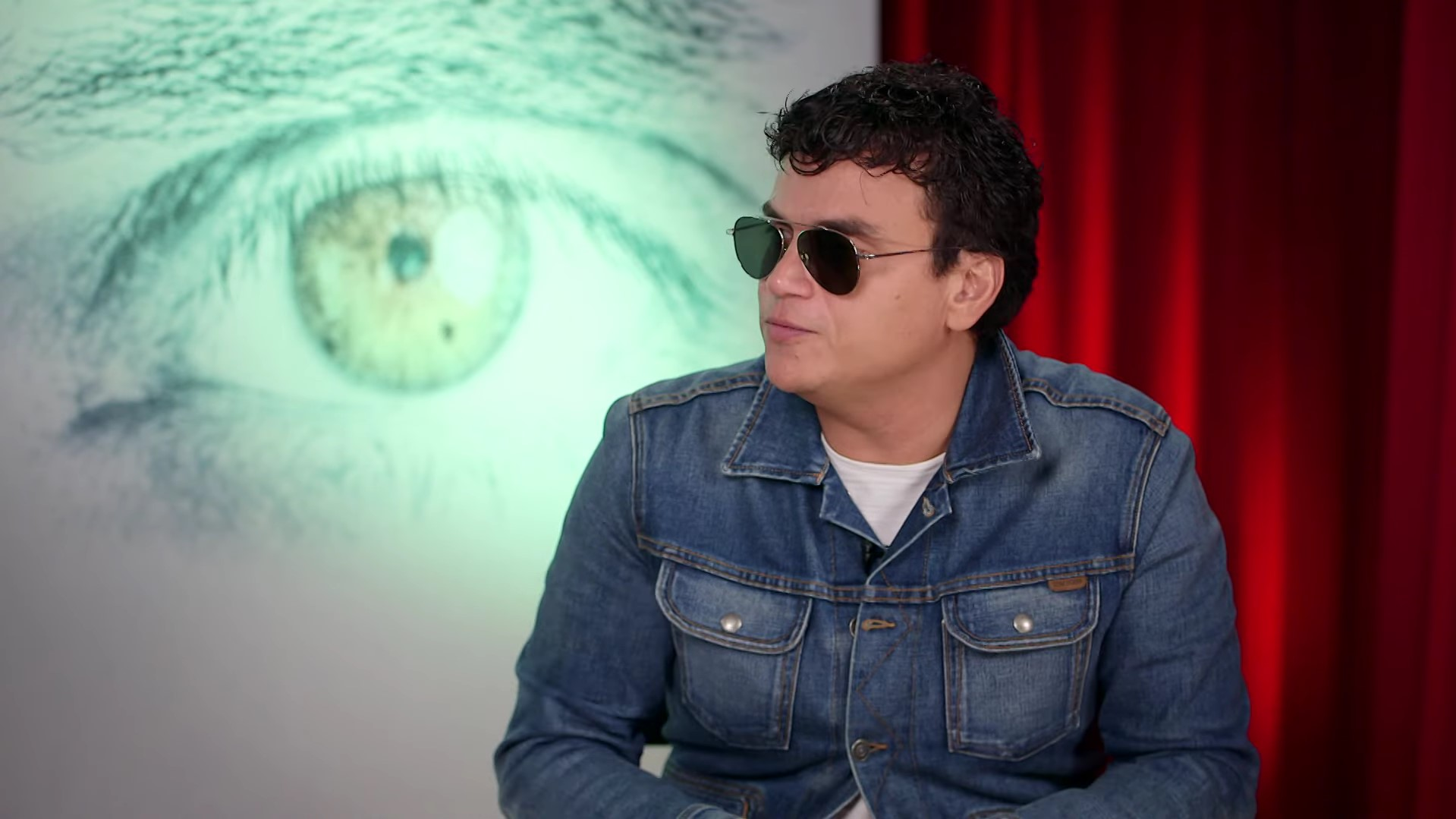
Silvestre Dangond was featured on Thalía's 2016 song "De Ti".

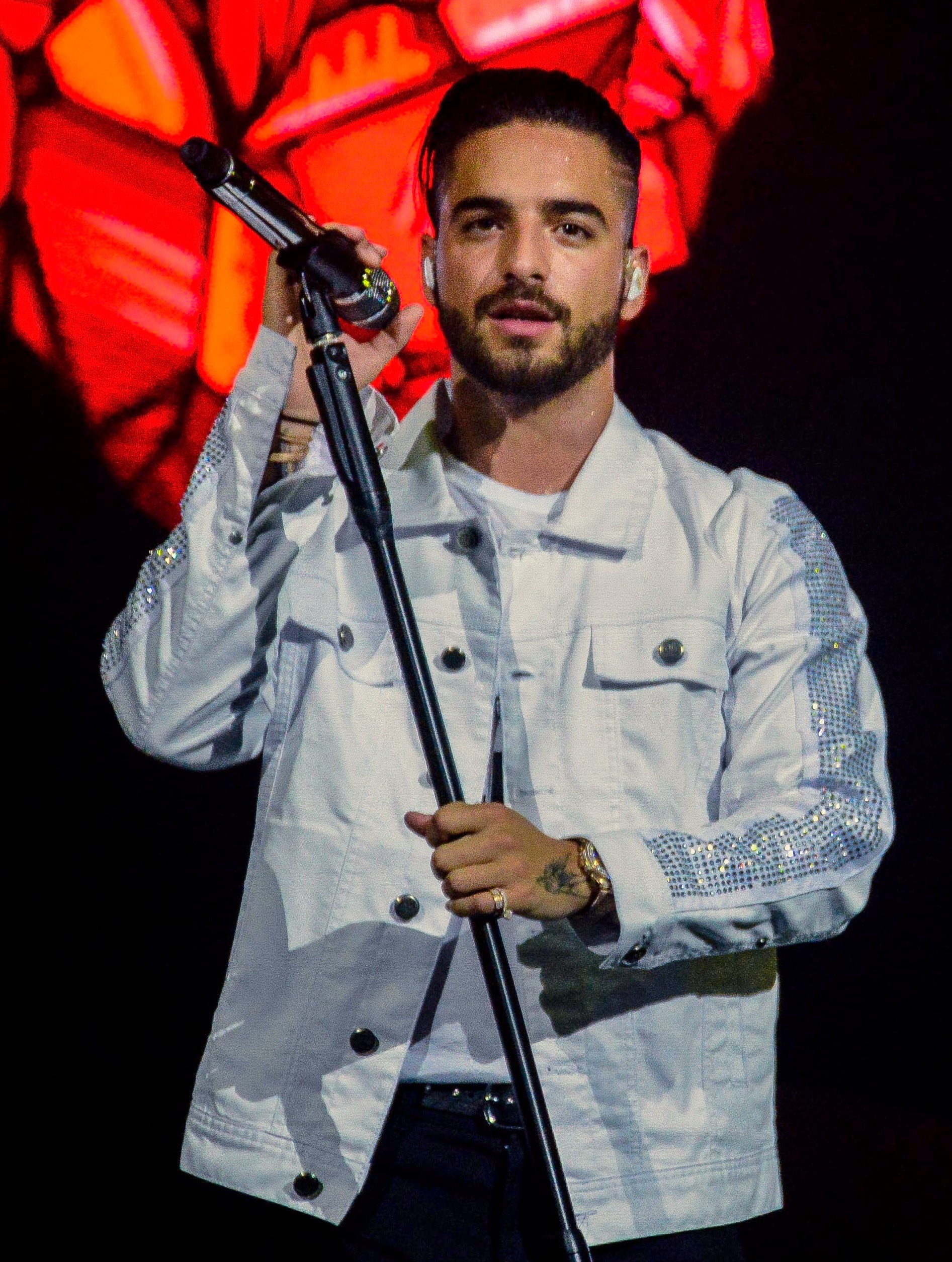
Thalía and Maluma released "Desde Esa Noche" in 2016.

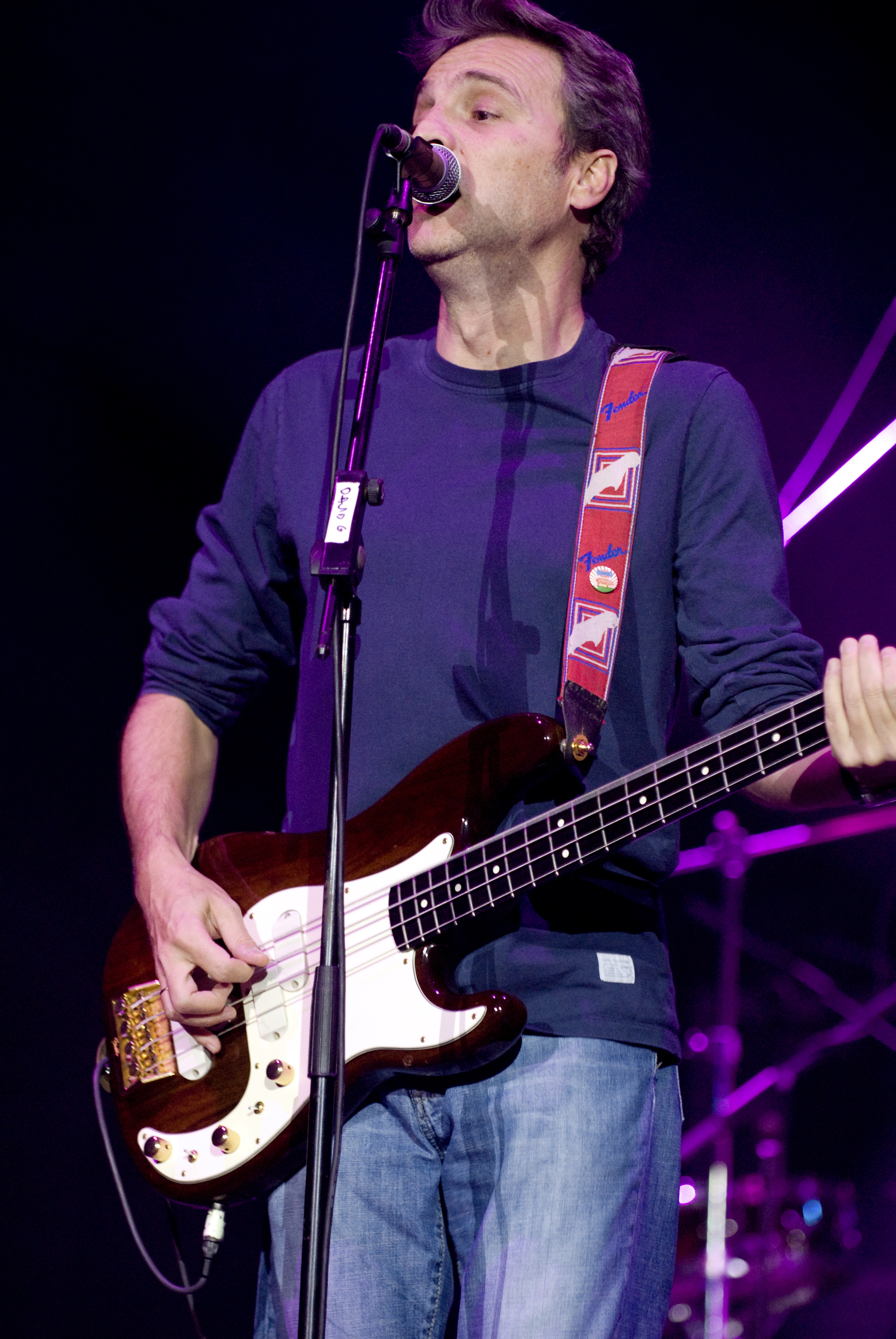
David Summers worked on Thalía's rendition of "Devuélveme a Mi Chica" in 2023.

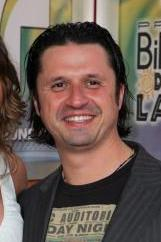
Áureo Baqueiro has worked with Thalía on many albums of her career.

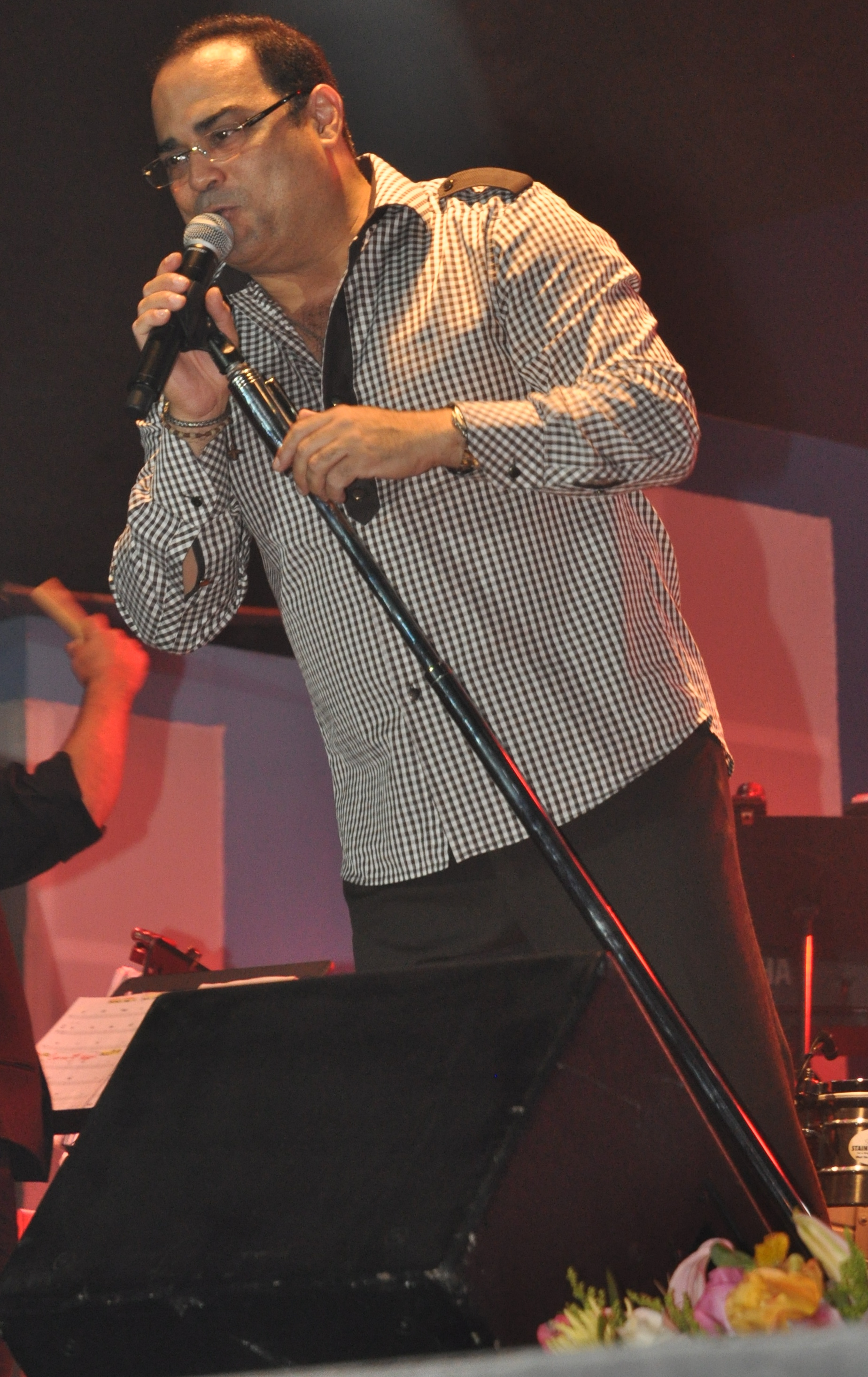
Gilberto Santa Rosa appeared on Thalía's "Dime Si Ahora" in 2012.

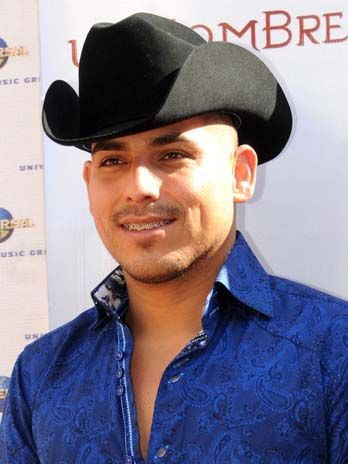
Thalía recorded Espionza Paz's song "El Próximo Viernes" in 2009.

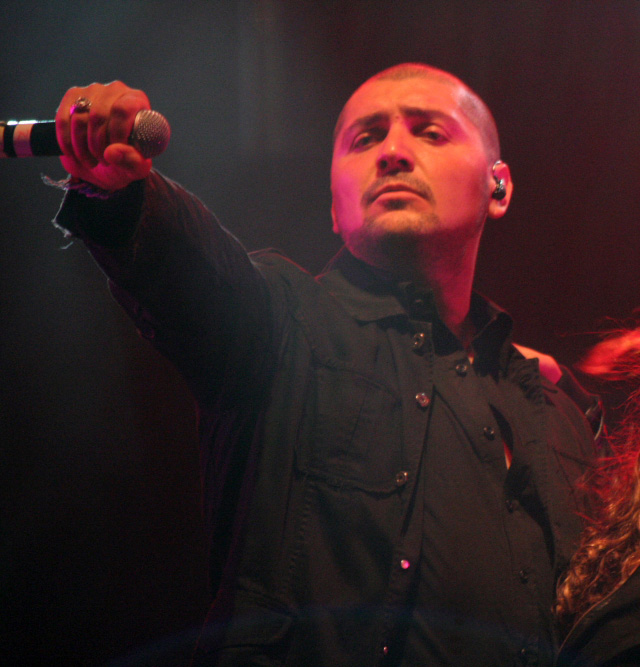
Reyli Barba co-wrote "Enséñame a Vivir" for Thalía's 2009 live album "Primera Fila".

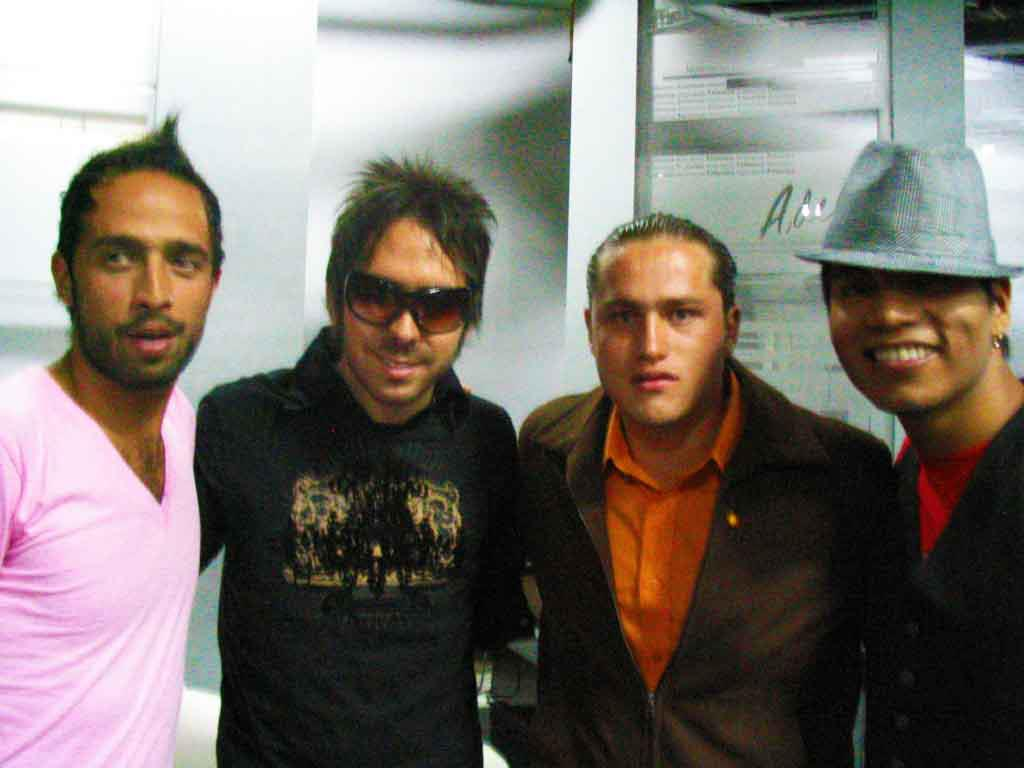
Mario Domm from the band Camila co-wrote 2009's "Equivocada" among other songs.

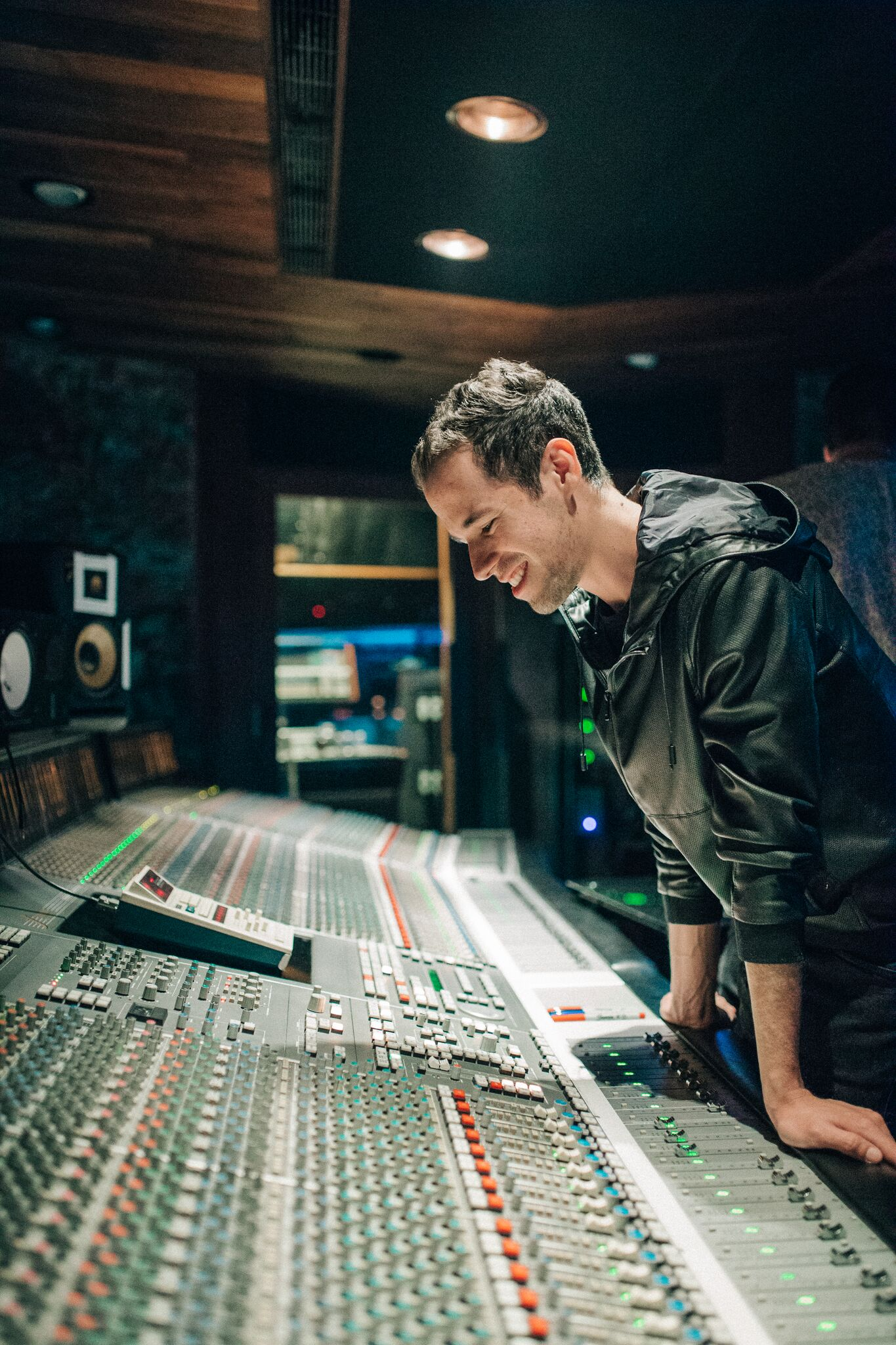
Edgar Barrera has worked on several Thalía songs.

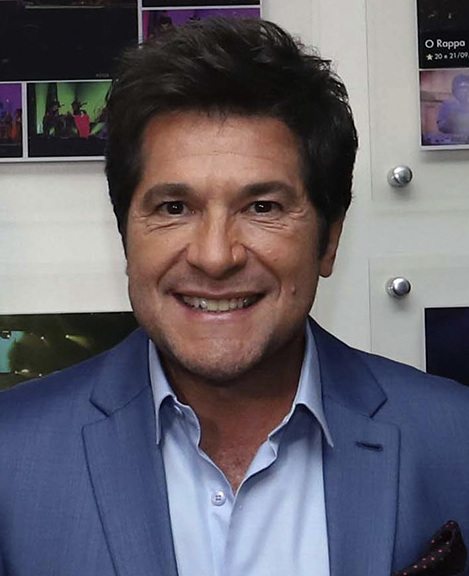
Brazilian singer Daniel collaborated with Thalía on the Portuguese track "Estou Apaixonado" in 2013.

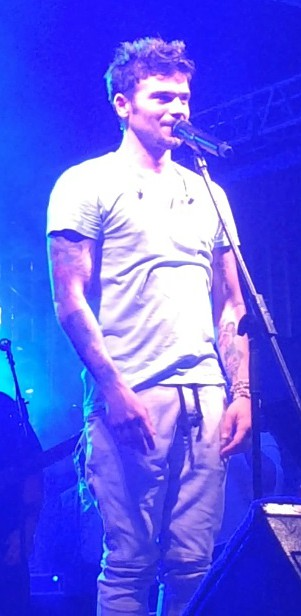
Pedro Capó collaborated with Thalía on the 2009 song "Estoy Enamorado".

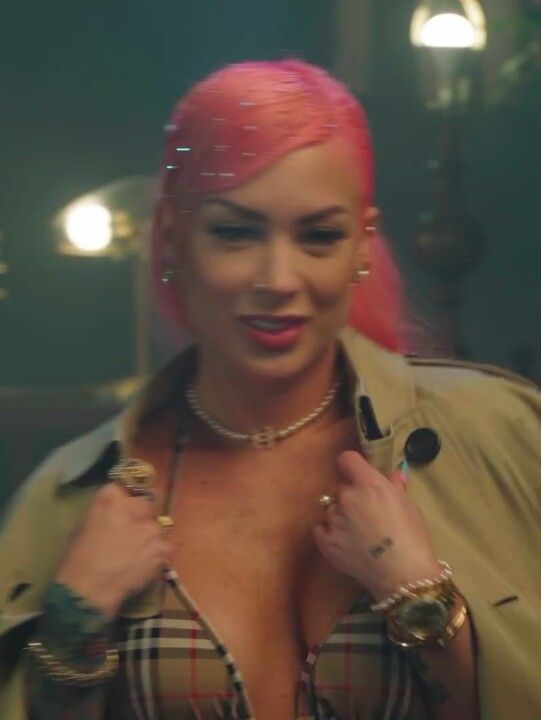
Thalía appeared on Leslie Shaw's 2020 track "Estoy Soltera".

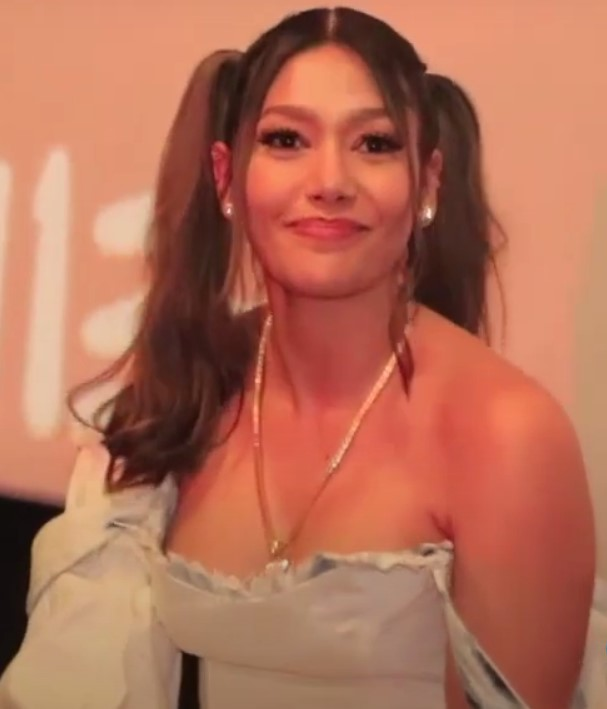
Farina has been featured on various songs along with Thalía.

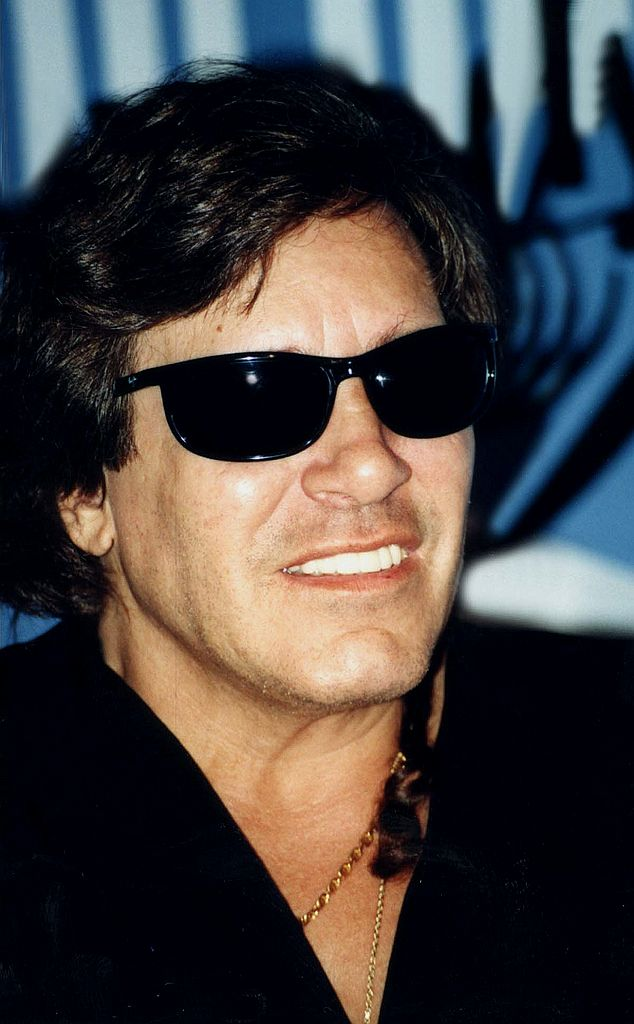
Thalía has released two different versions of José Feliciano's Christmas song "Feliz Navidad".

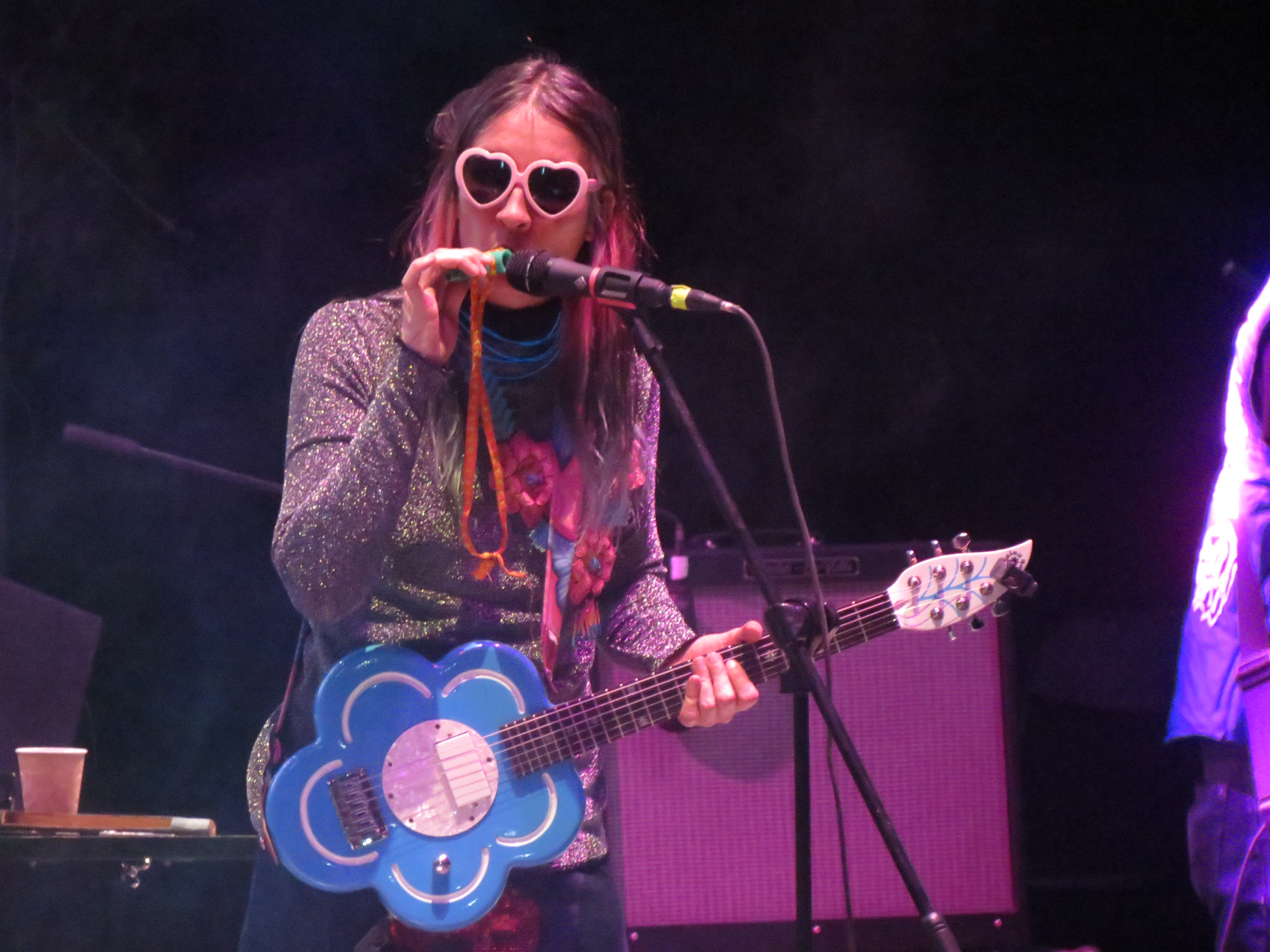
Aterciopelados participated on Thalía's rendition of their song "Florecita Rockera" in 2023.

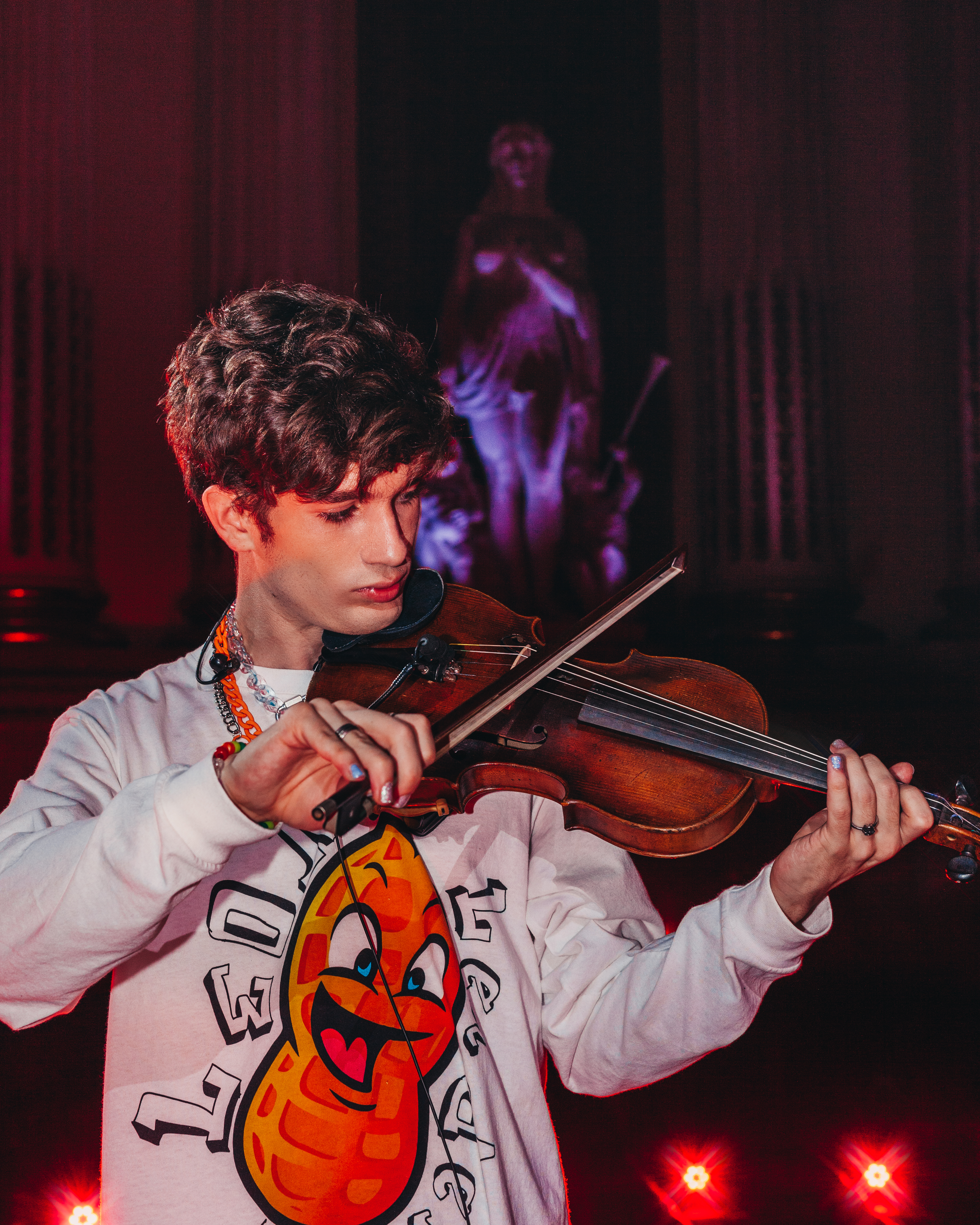
Leon Leiden collaborated on the 2023 track "Florecita Rockera".

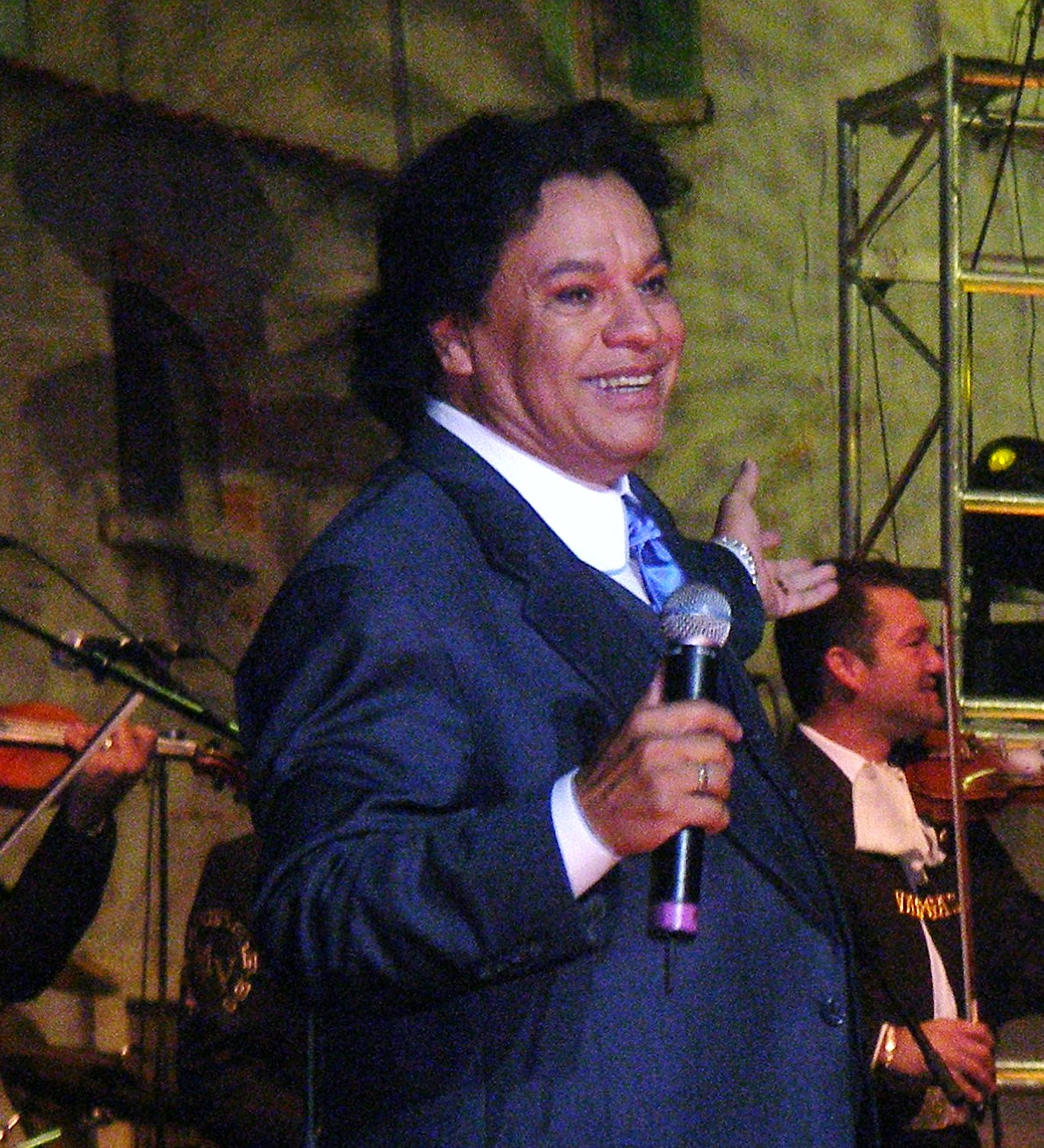
Thalía has recorded "Gracias a Dios" and "Insensible", both written by Juan Gabriel.

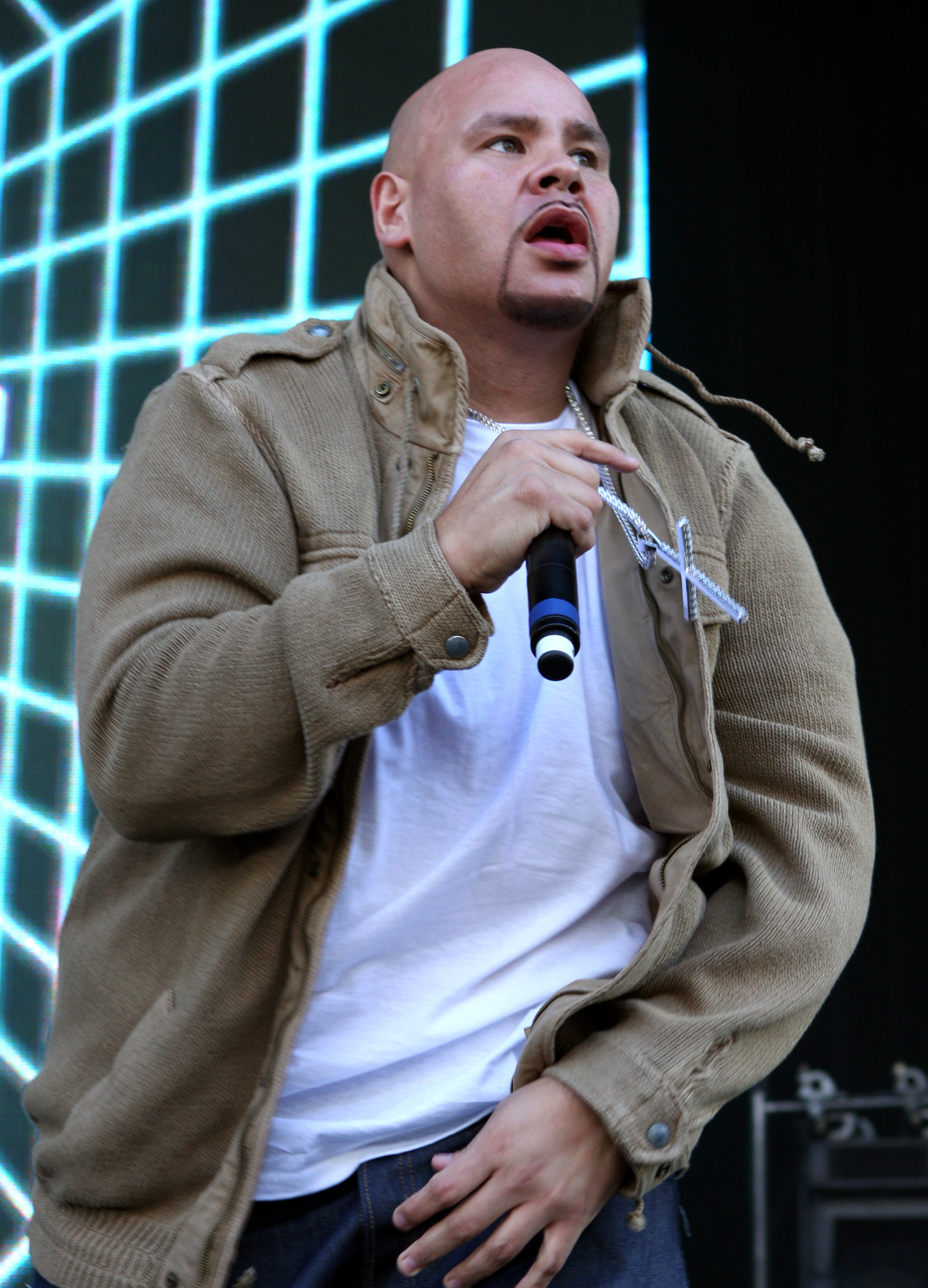
Fat Joe collaborated with Thalía on 2003's "I Want You" as well as "Tranquila" in 2014.

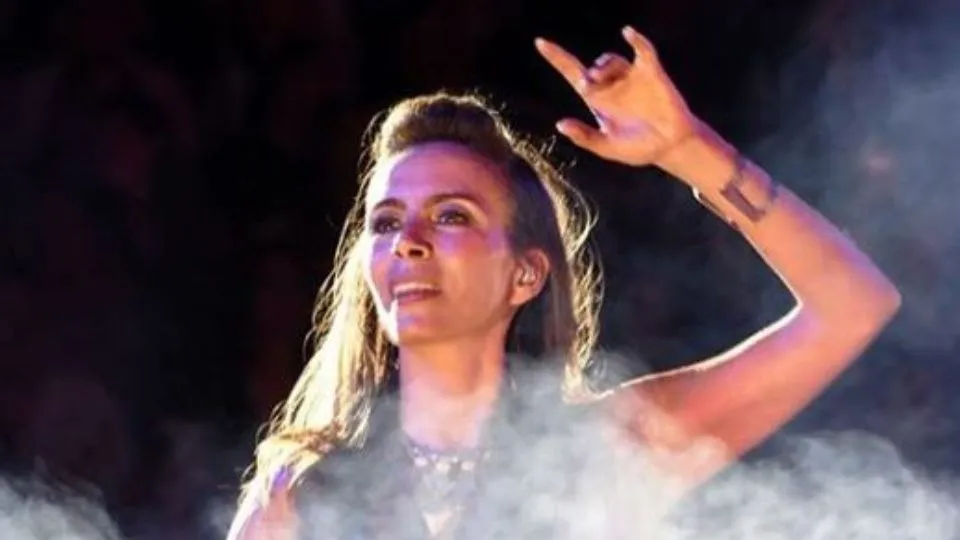
Sasha, Benny y Erik performed with Thalía the song "Junto a Ti", released in 2017.

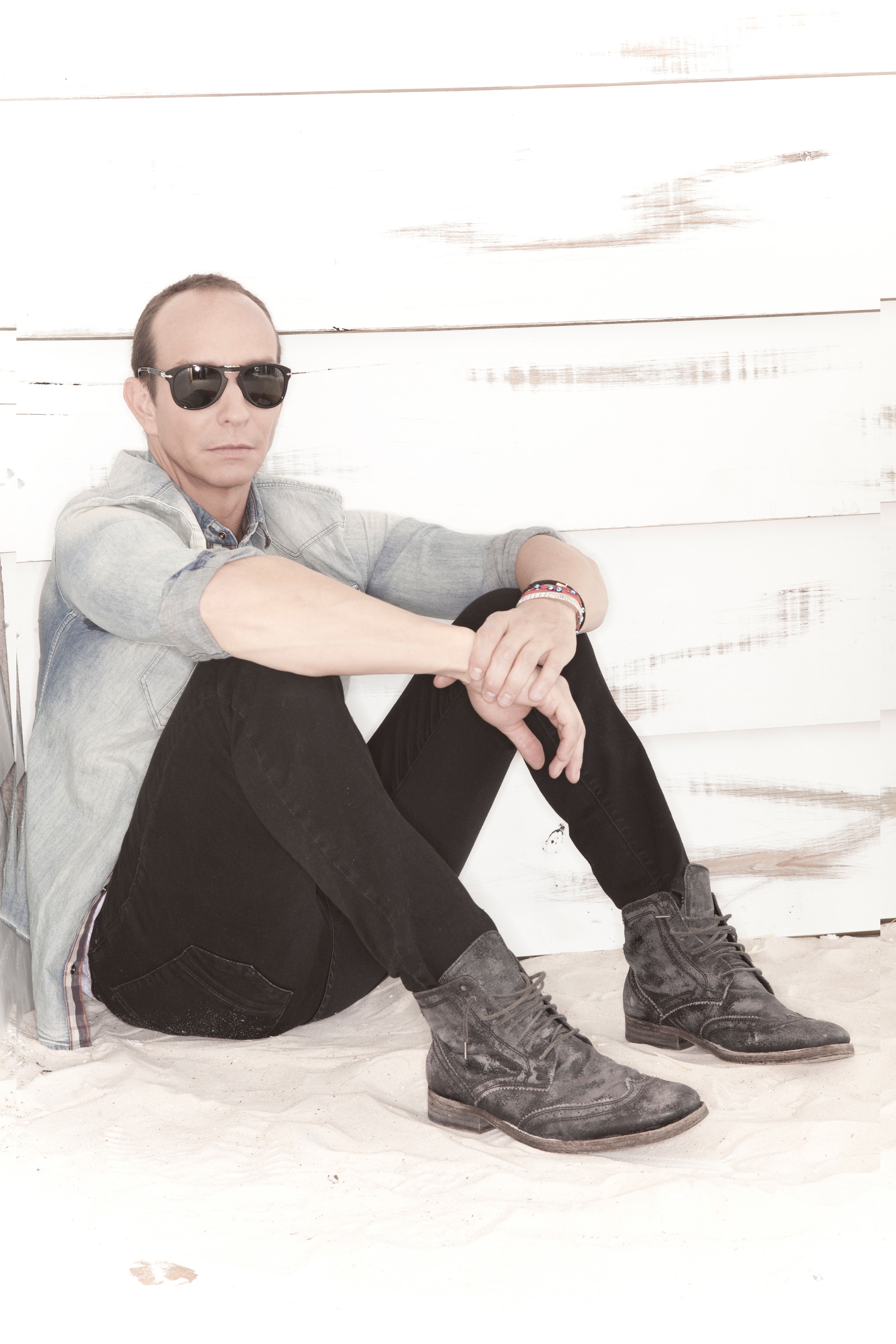
Erik Rubín collaborated with Thalía on 2012's "La Apuesta".

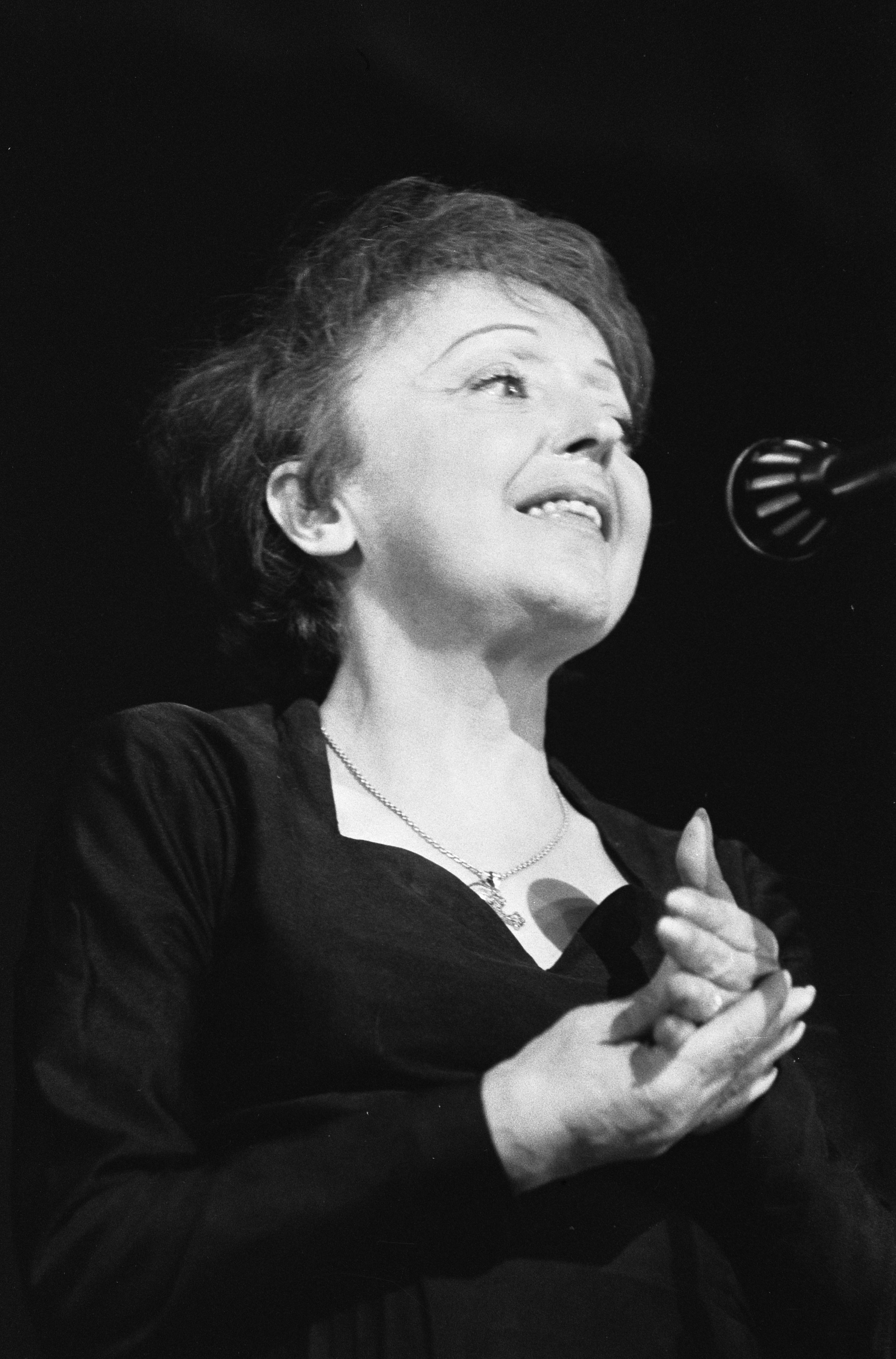
Thalía covered Édith Piaf's classic "La Vie En Rose" in 1992.

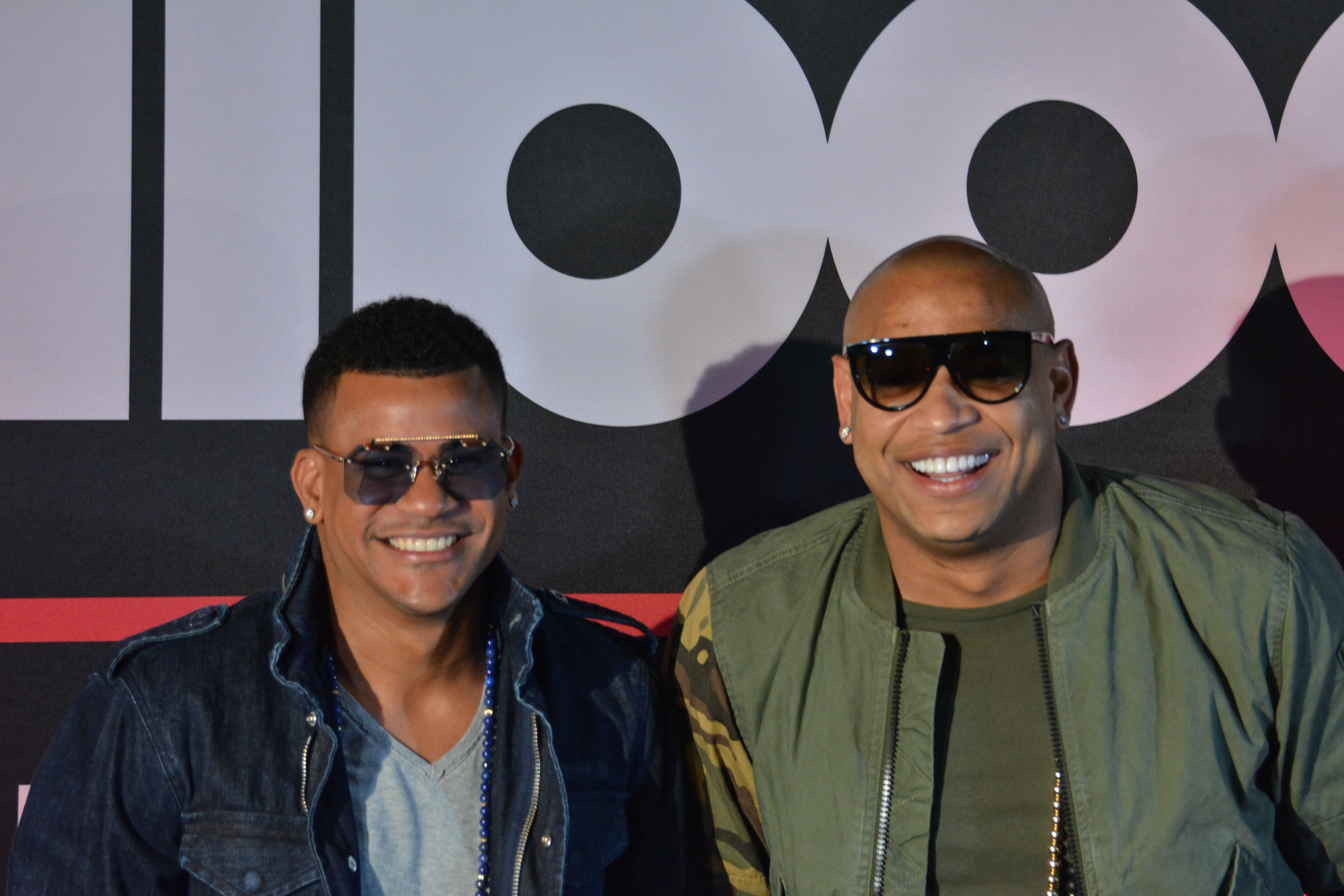
Gente de Zona appeared on Thalía's "Lento" in 2018.

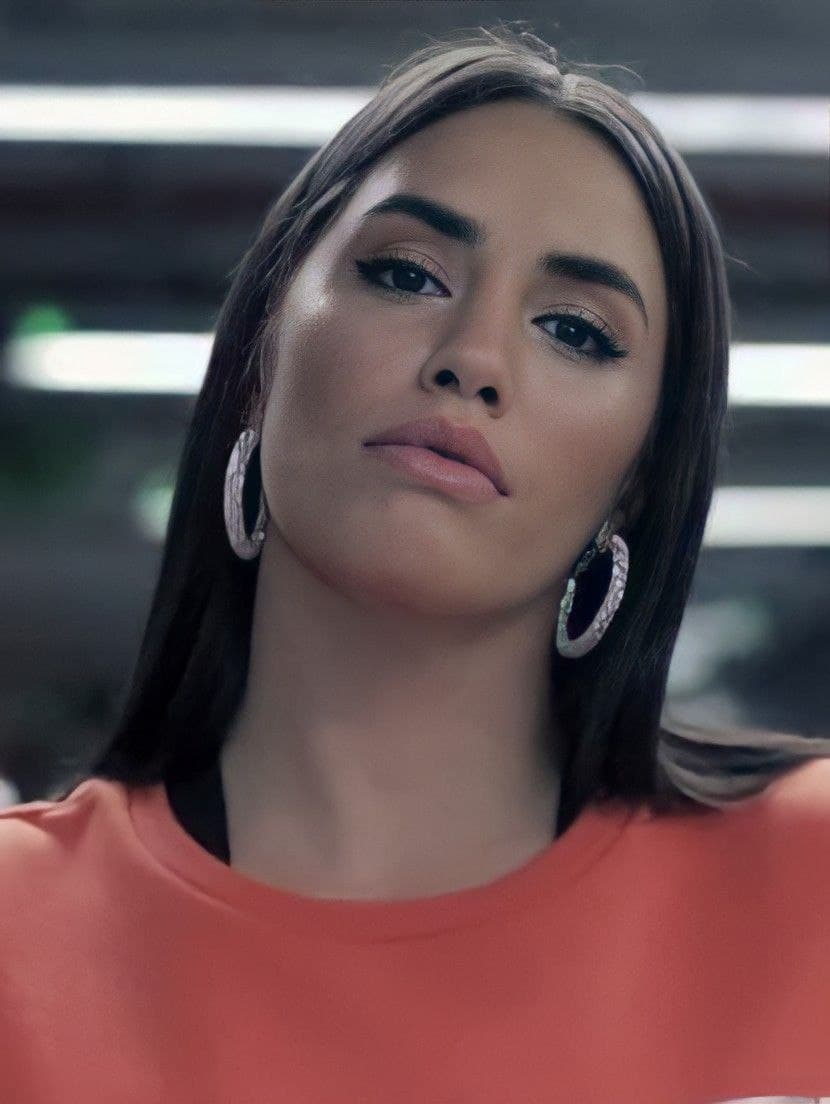
Lali Espósito was featured on Thalía's "Lindo Pero Bruto" in 2018.

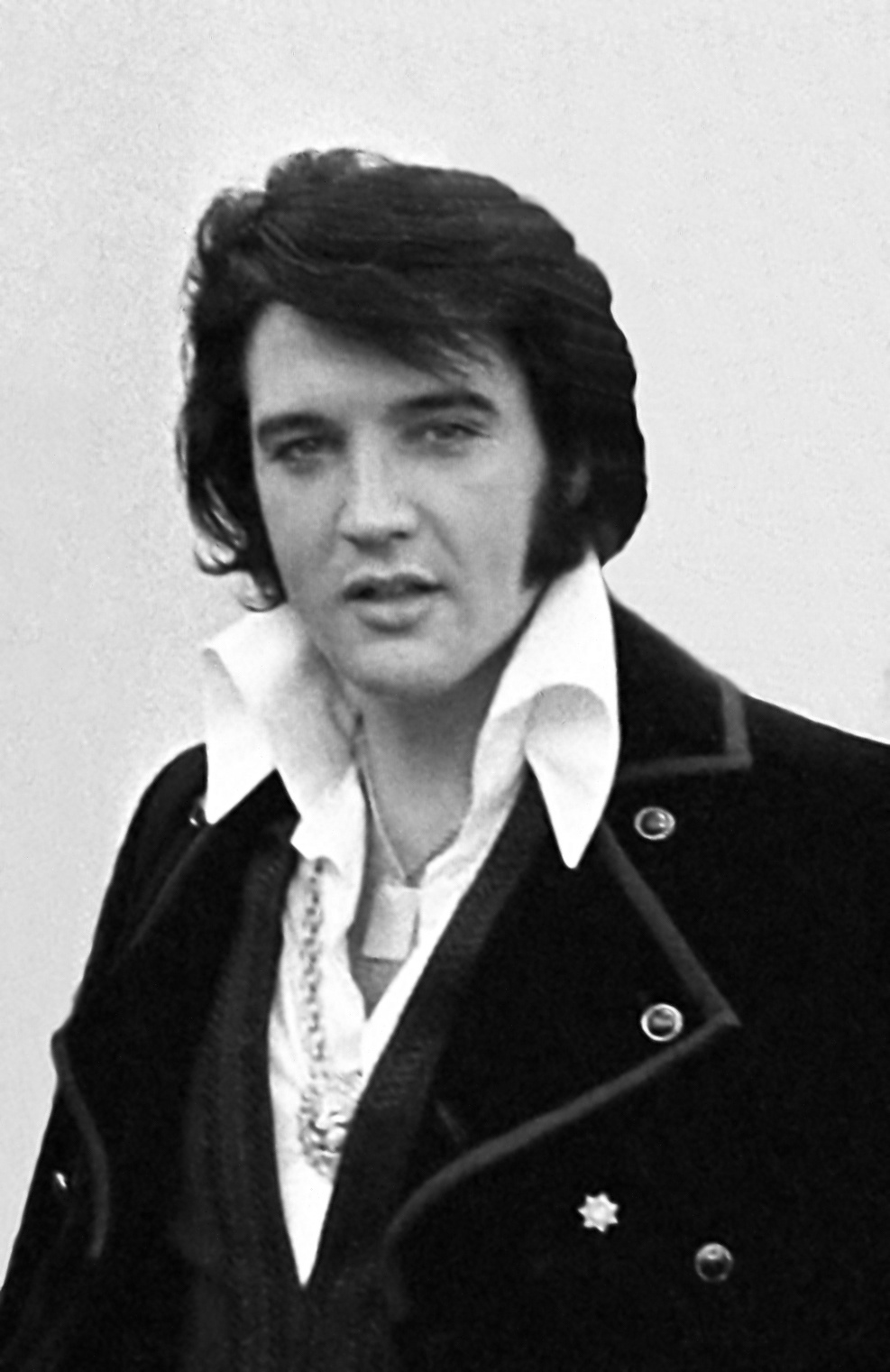
Thalía participated on Elvis Presley's posthumous album "Love Me Tender Duets" in 2010.

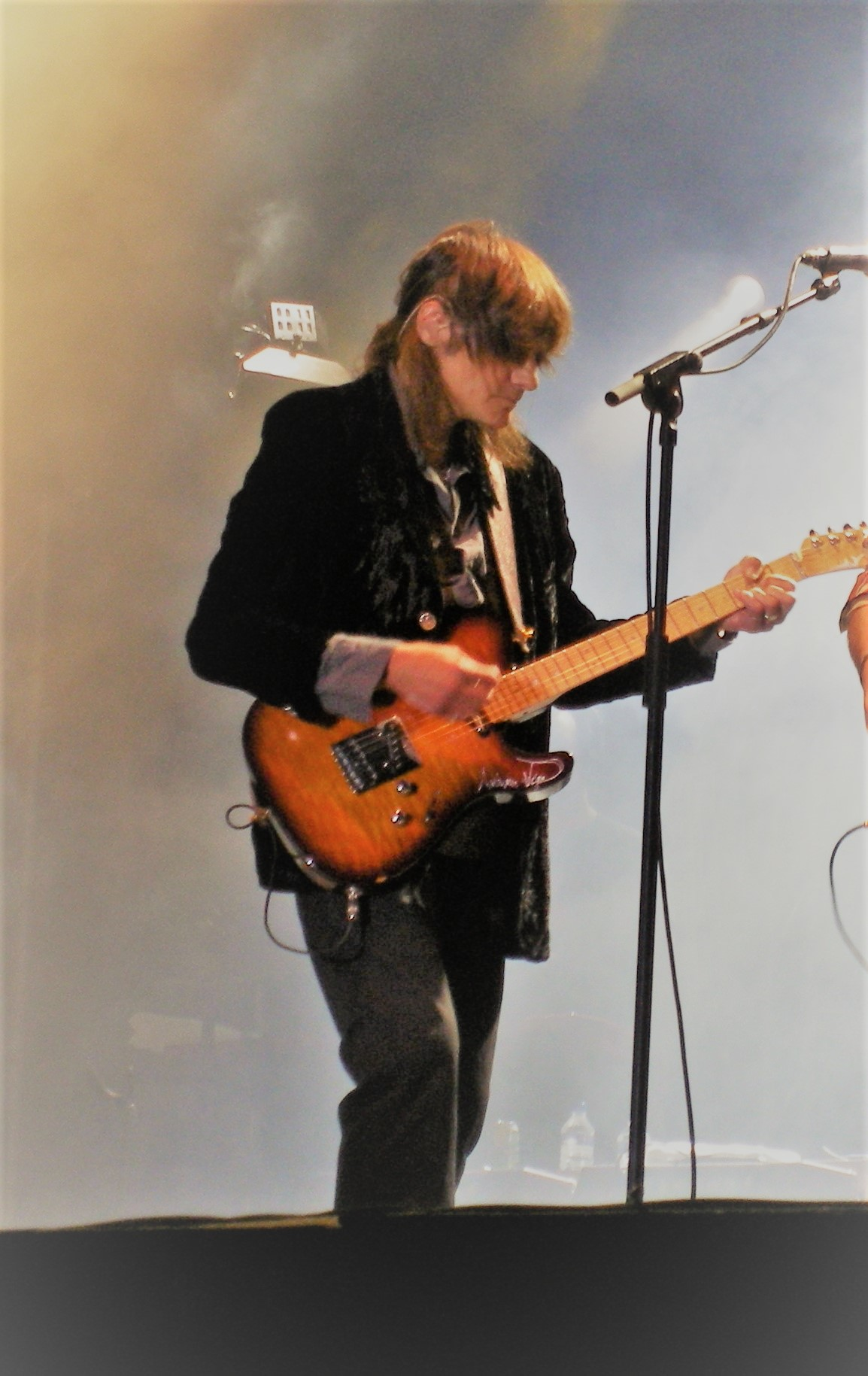
Thalía covered Nacha Pop's "Lucha de Gigantes" co-written by Antonio Vega in 2023.

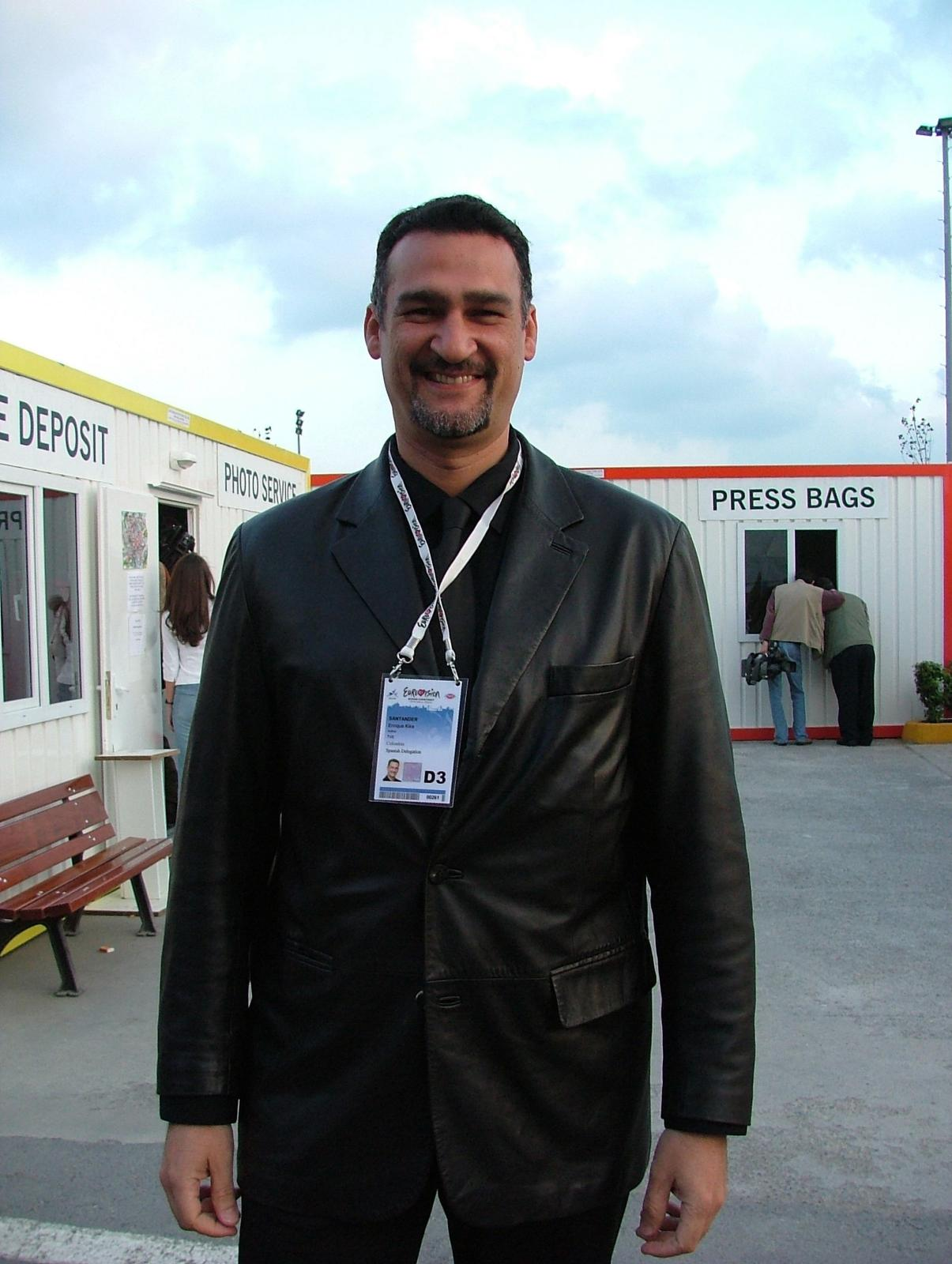
Kike Santander has written many of Thalía's hits.

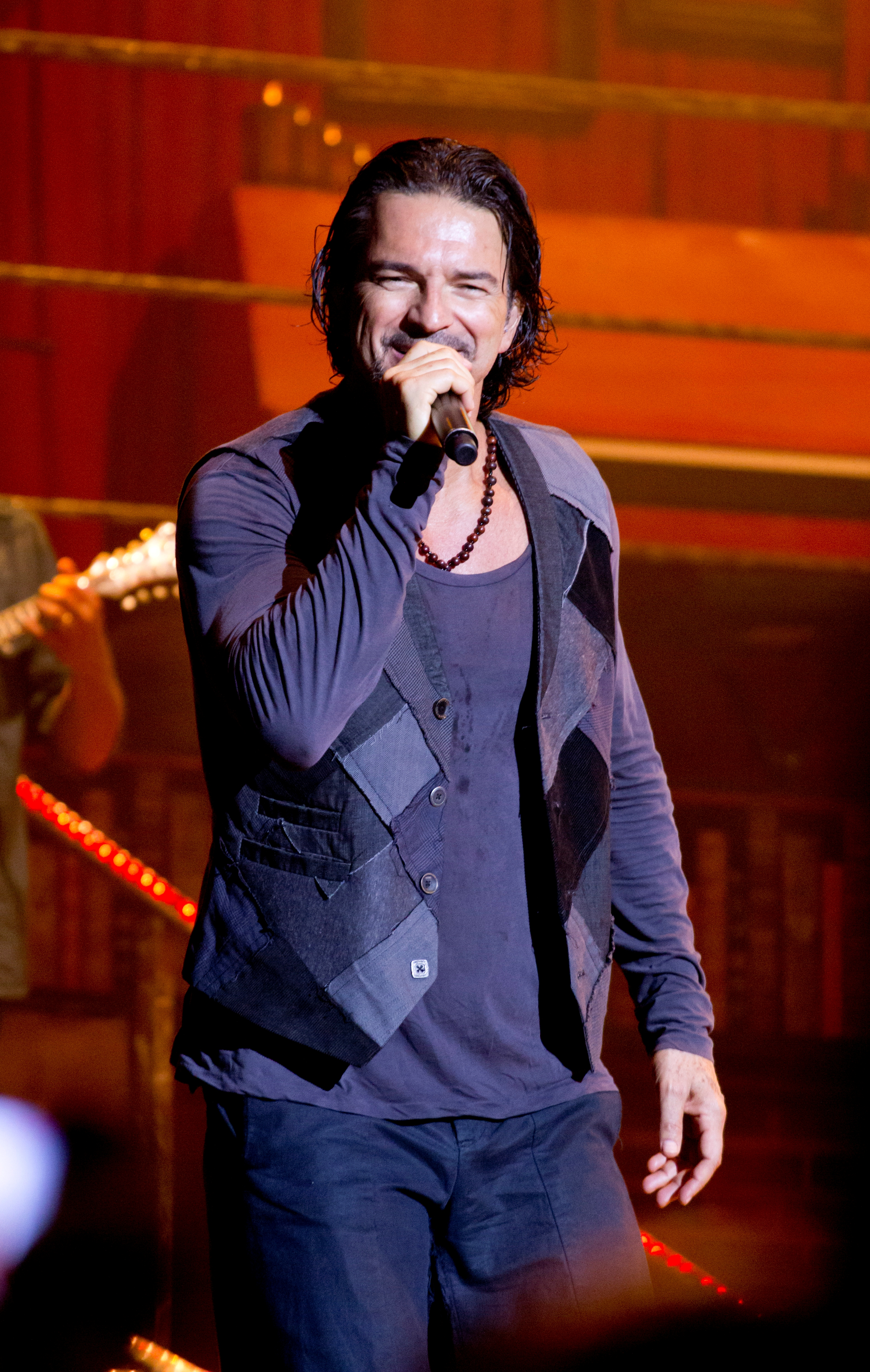
Thalía covered Ricardo Arjona's track Mujeres in 2009.

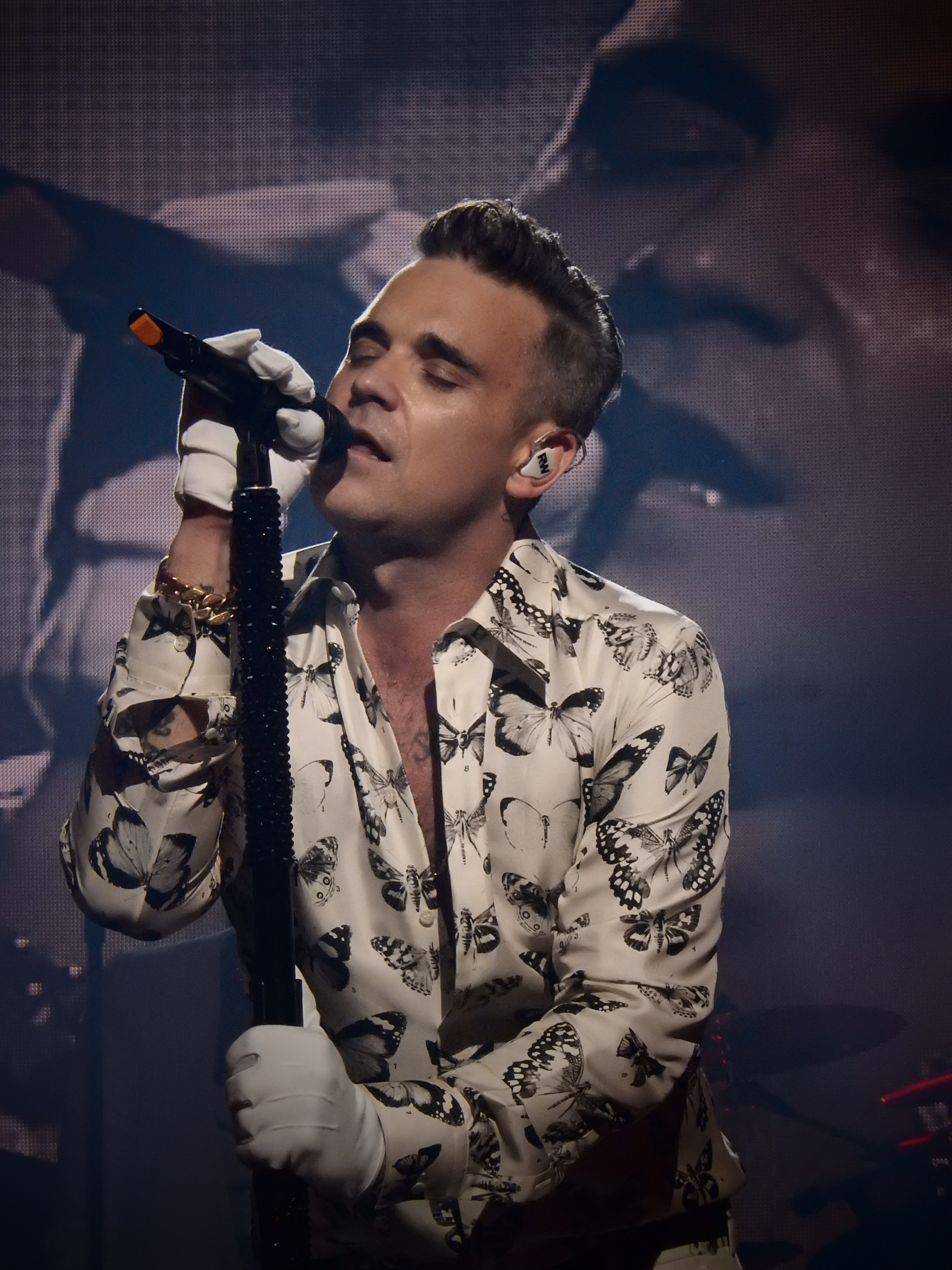
Robbie Williams was featured on Thalía's 2012 track "Muñequita Linda".

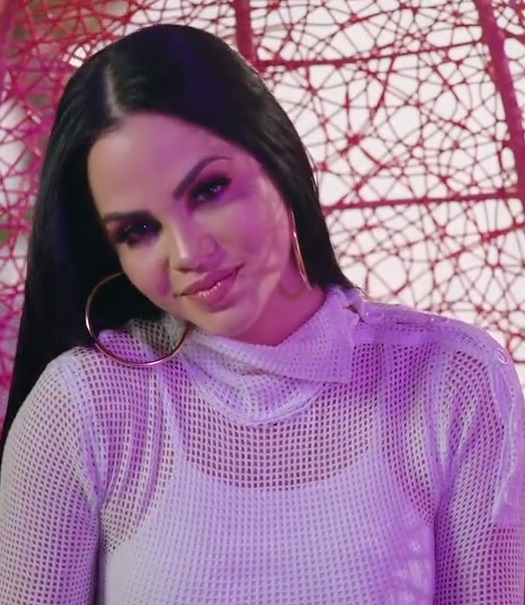
Thalía and Natti Natasha released "No Me Acuerdo" in 2018.

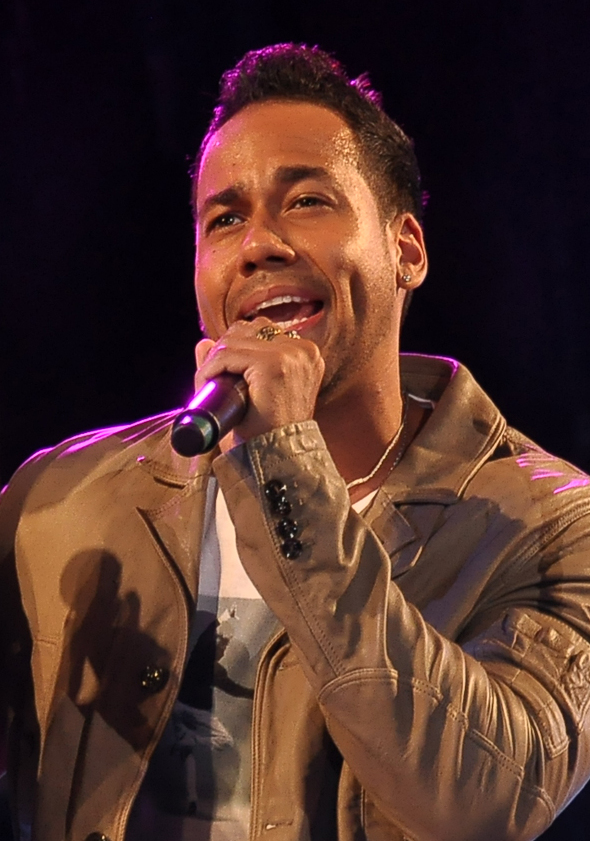
Thalía and Romeo Santos released "No, No, No" in 2006.

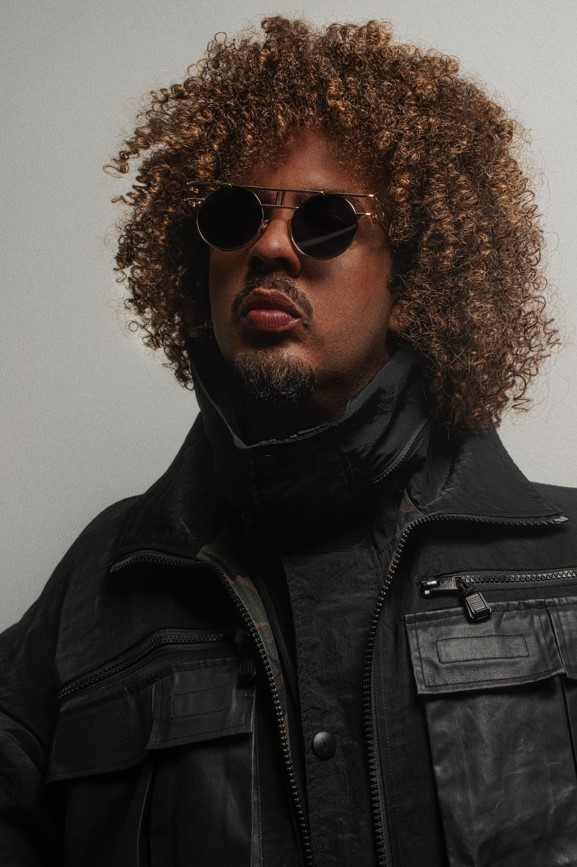
Maffio collaborated with Thalía on her 2021 track "No Te Vi".

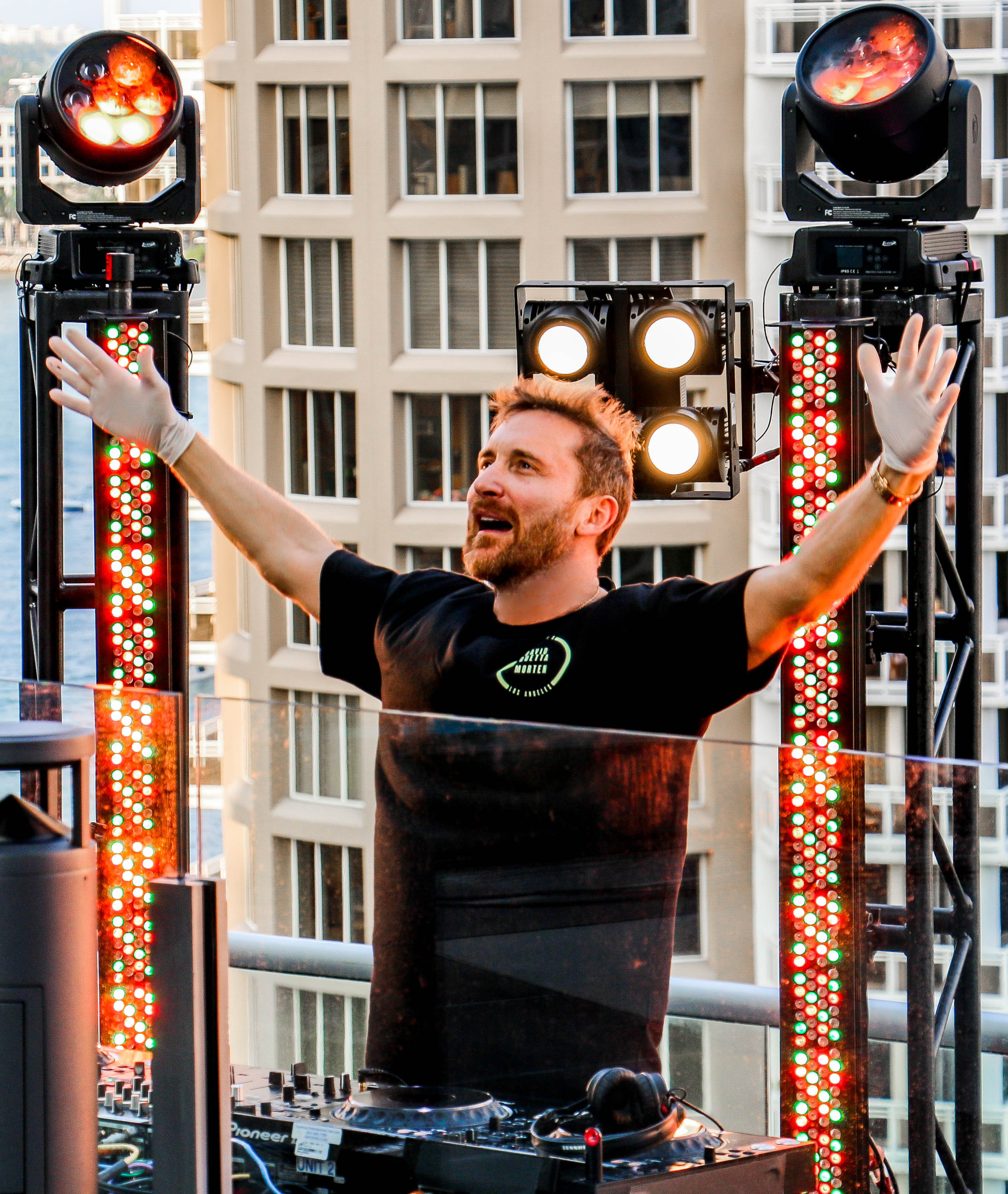
Thalía collaborated with various artists on David Guetta's "Pa' la Cultura" in 2020.

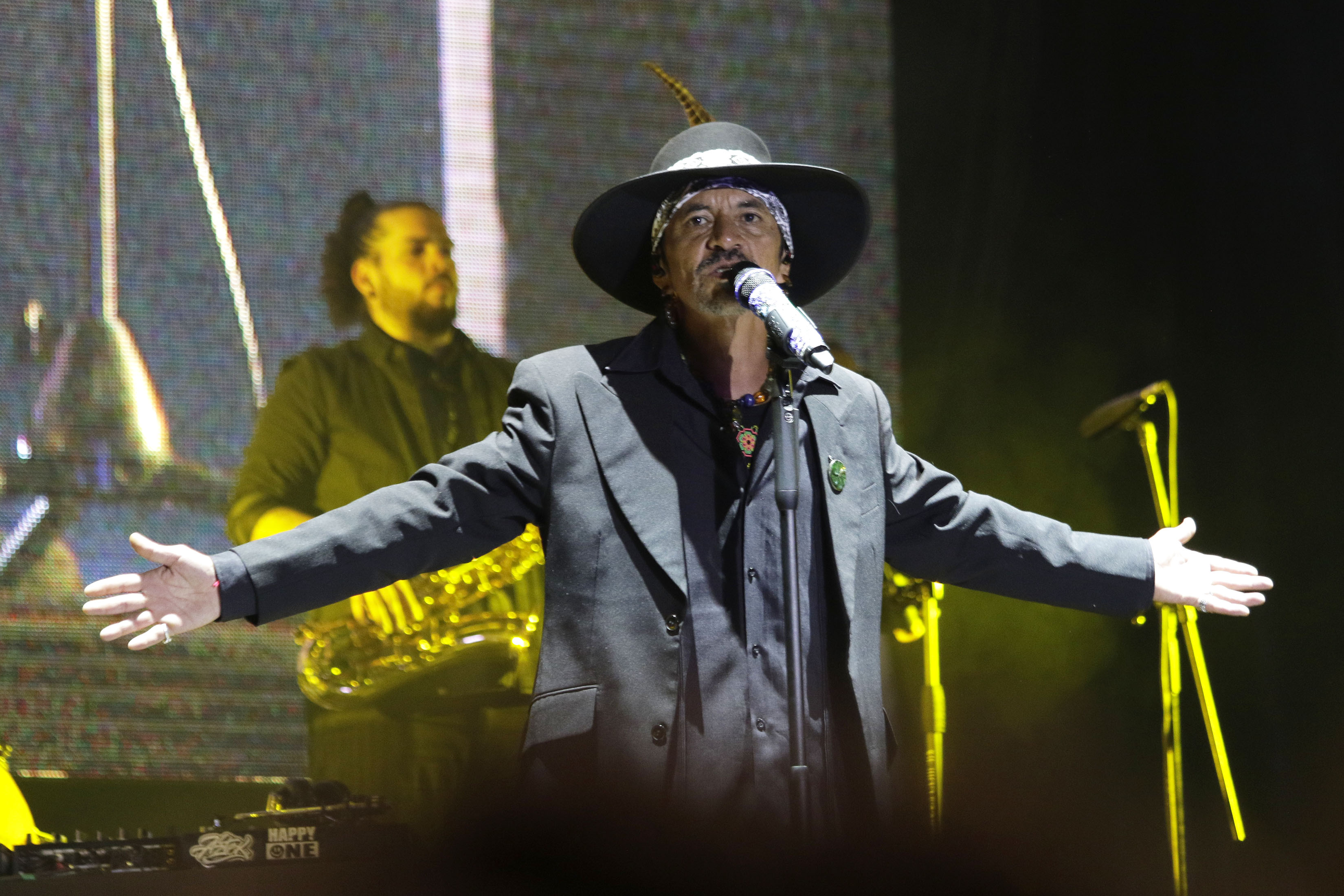
Roco Pachukote from La Maldita Vecindad appeared on Thalía's rendition of "Pachuco" in 2023.

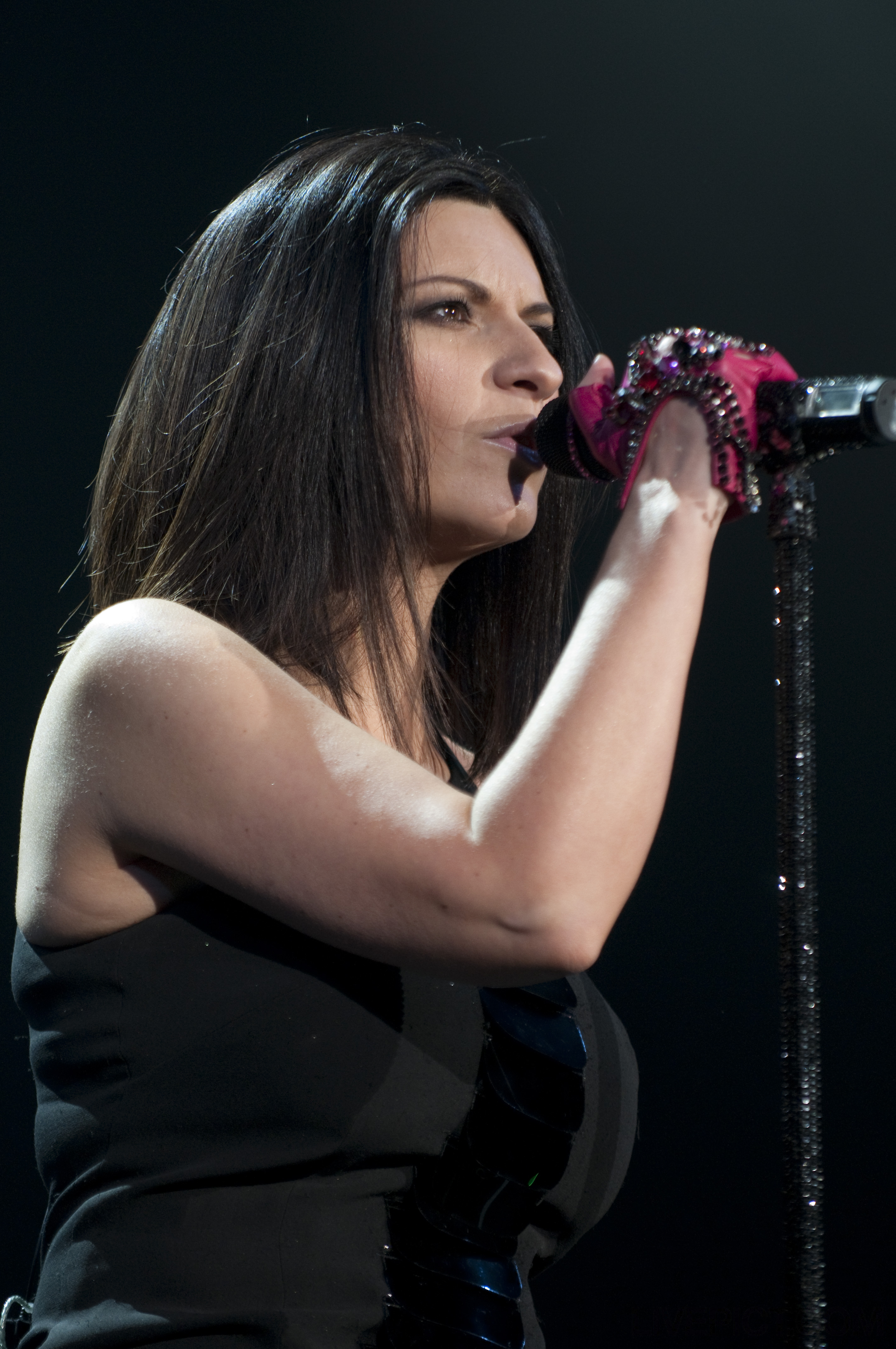
Laura Pausini invited Thalía to her single "Sino a Ti" in 2014.

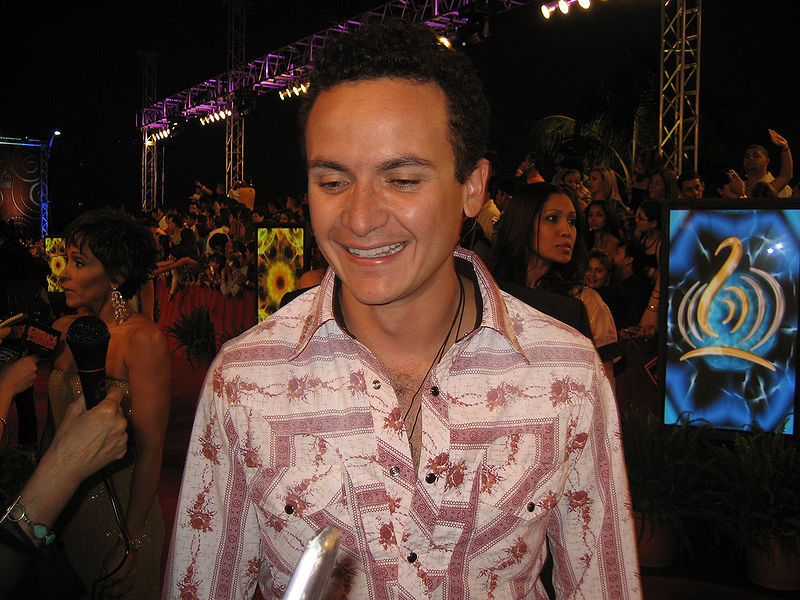
Fonseca collaborated on Thalía's 2018 track "Sube, Sube".

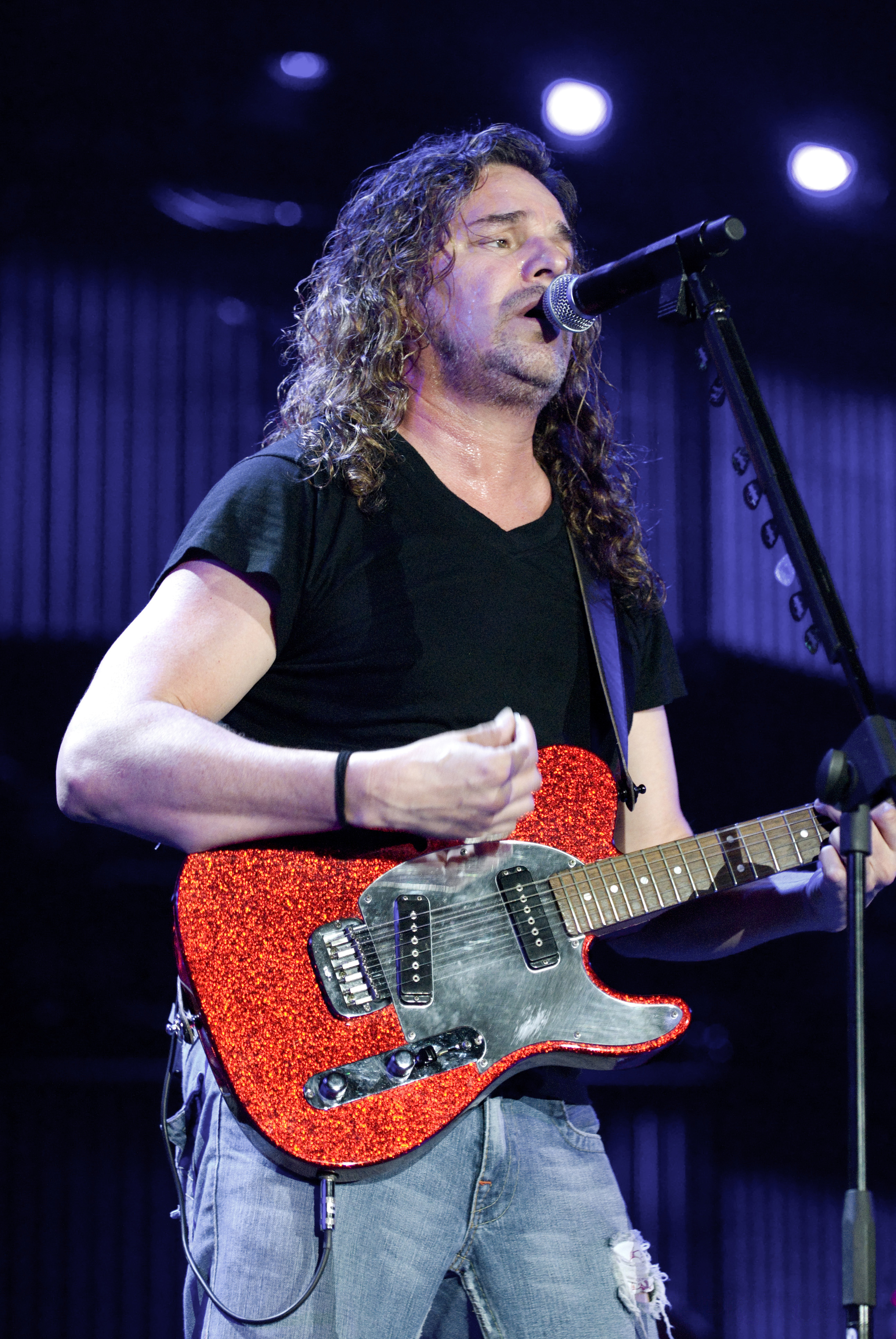
In 2023 Thalía covered Maná's hit "Rayando el Sol".

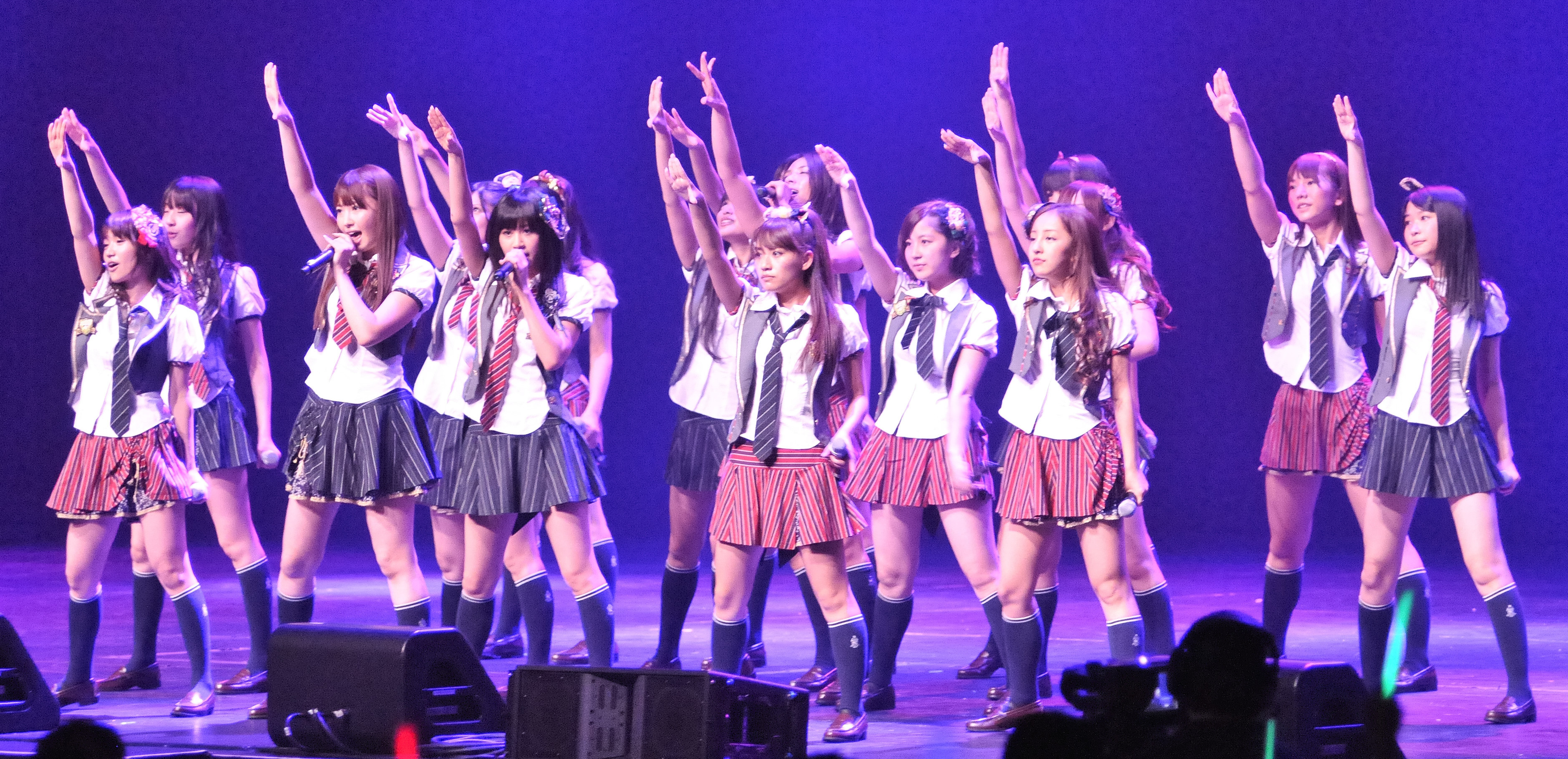
Thalía covered AKB48's track "Sugar Rush" in 2014.

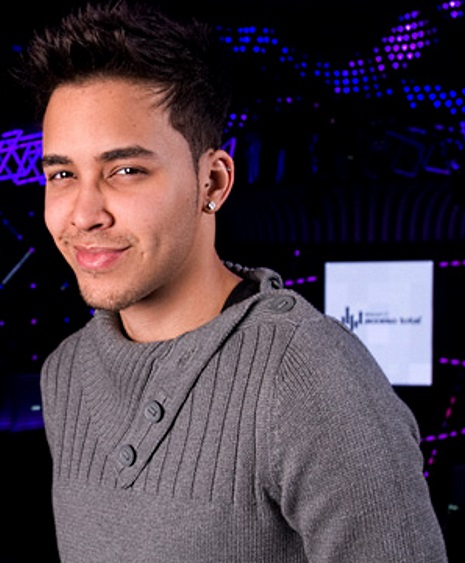
Prince Royce worked with Thalía on the 2012 song "Te Perdiste Mi Amor".

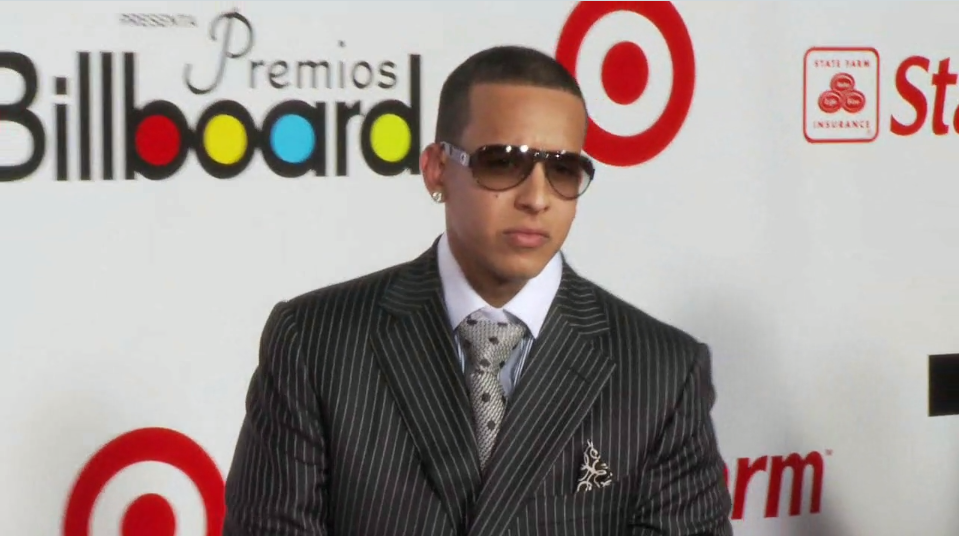
Daddy Yankee participated on the remix for "Ten Paciencia" in 2009.

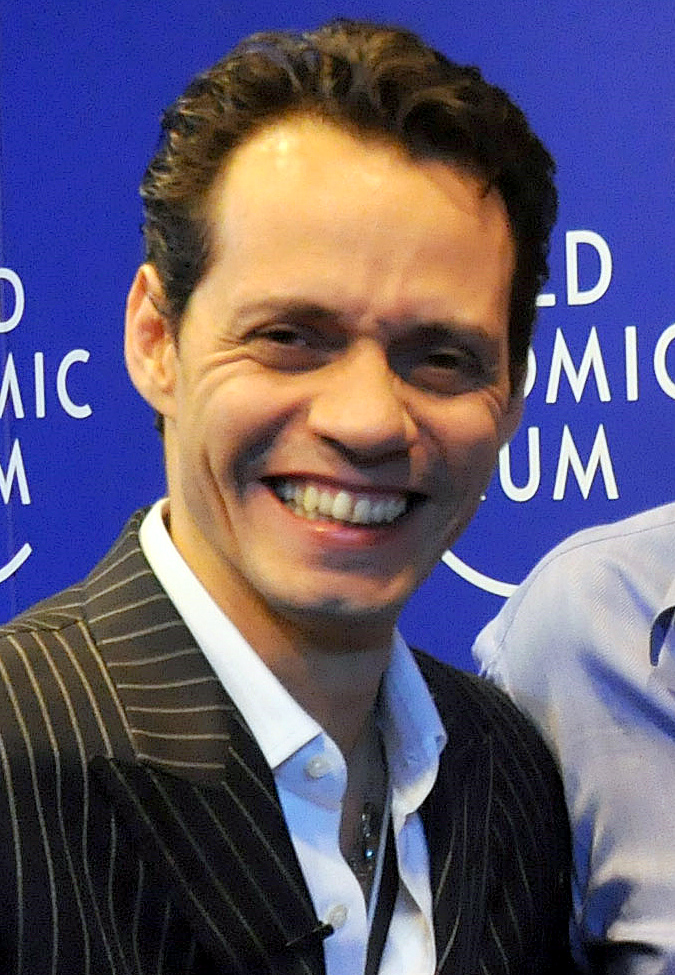
Marc Anthony collaborated with Thalía for the 2002 song "The Mexican".

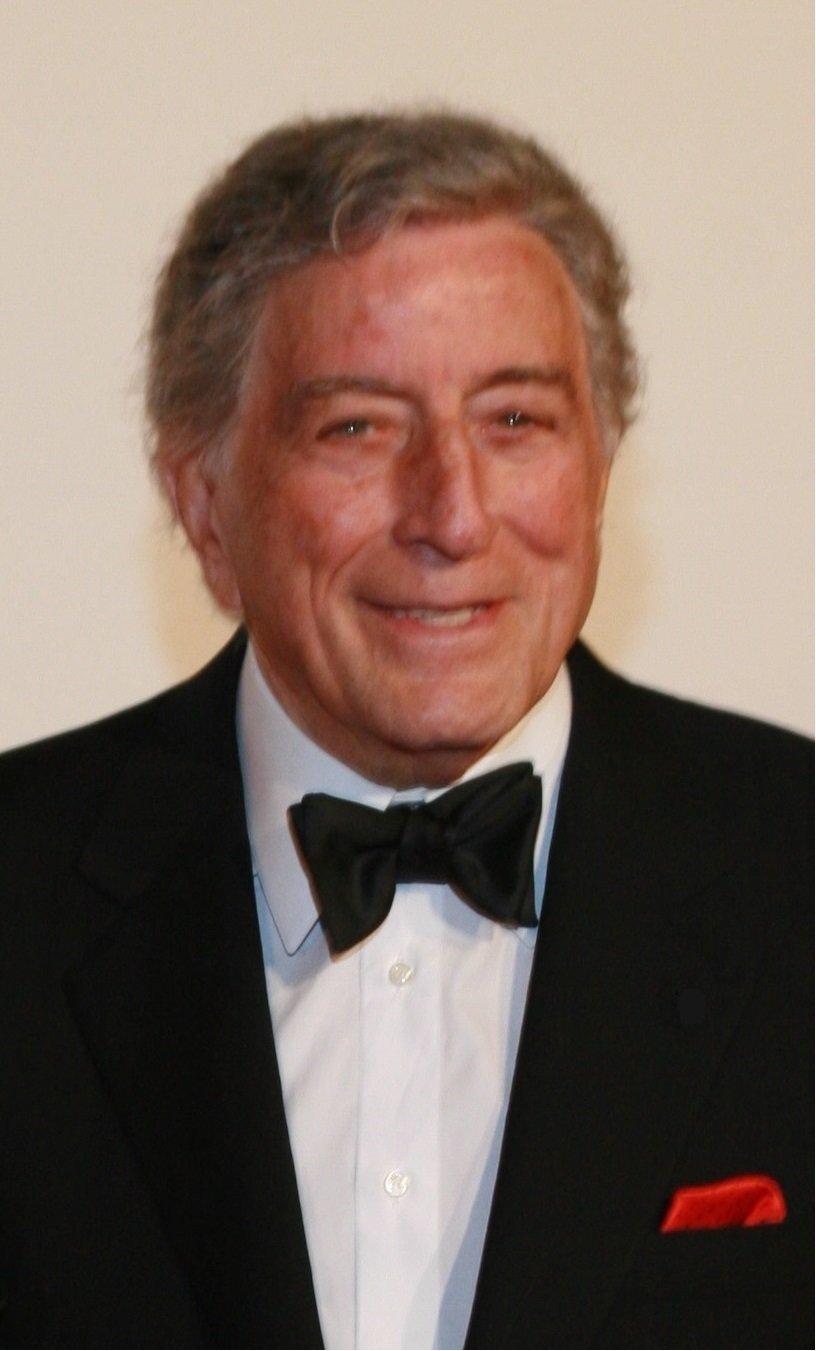
Thalía appeared on Tony Bennett's duets album in 2012.

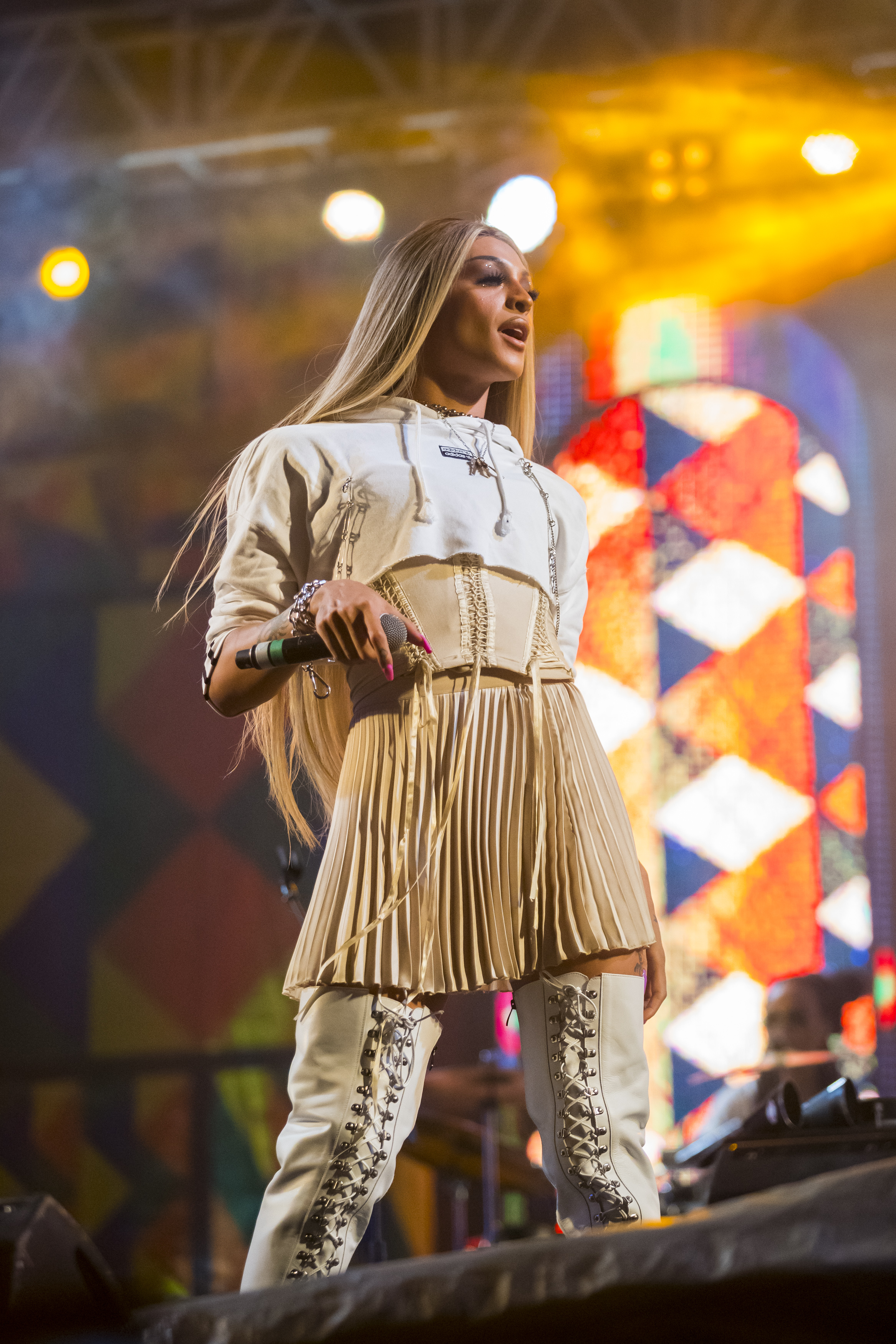
Thalía worked on Pabllo Vittar's track "Tímida" in 2020.

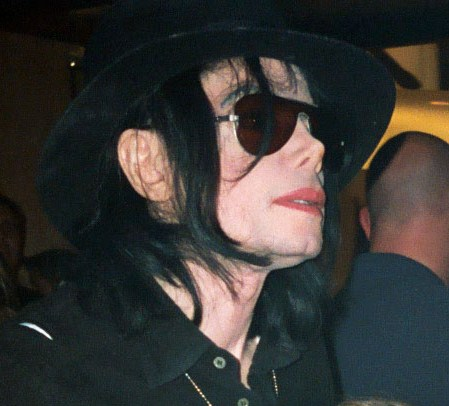
Thalía participated on both Spanish and English versions of Michael Jackson's charity single "What More Can I Give?".

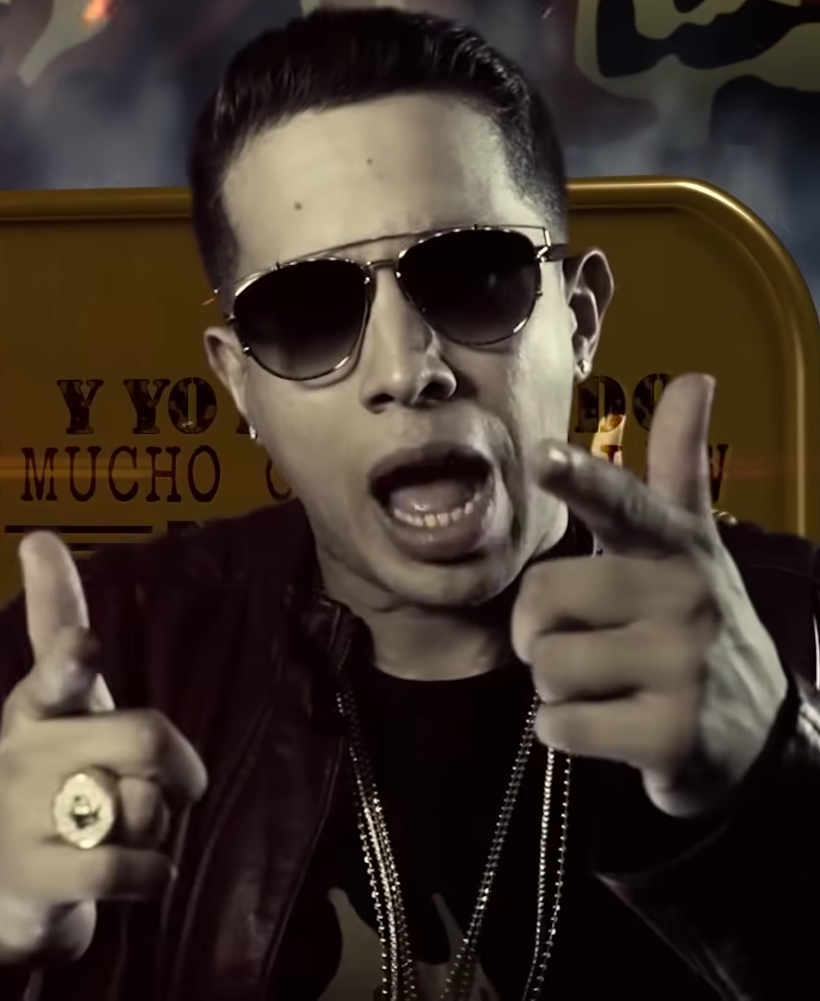
De La Ghetto collaborated with Thalía for her 2016 song "Todavía Te Quiero".

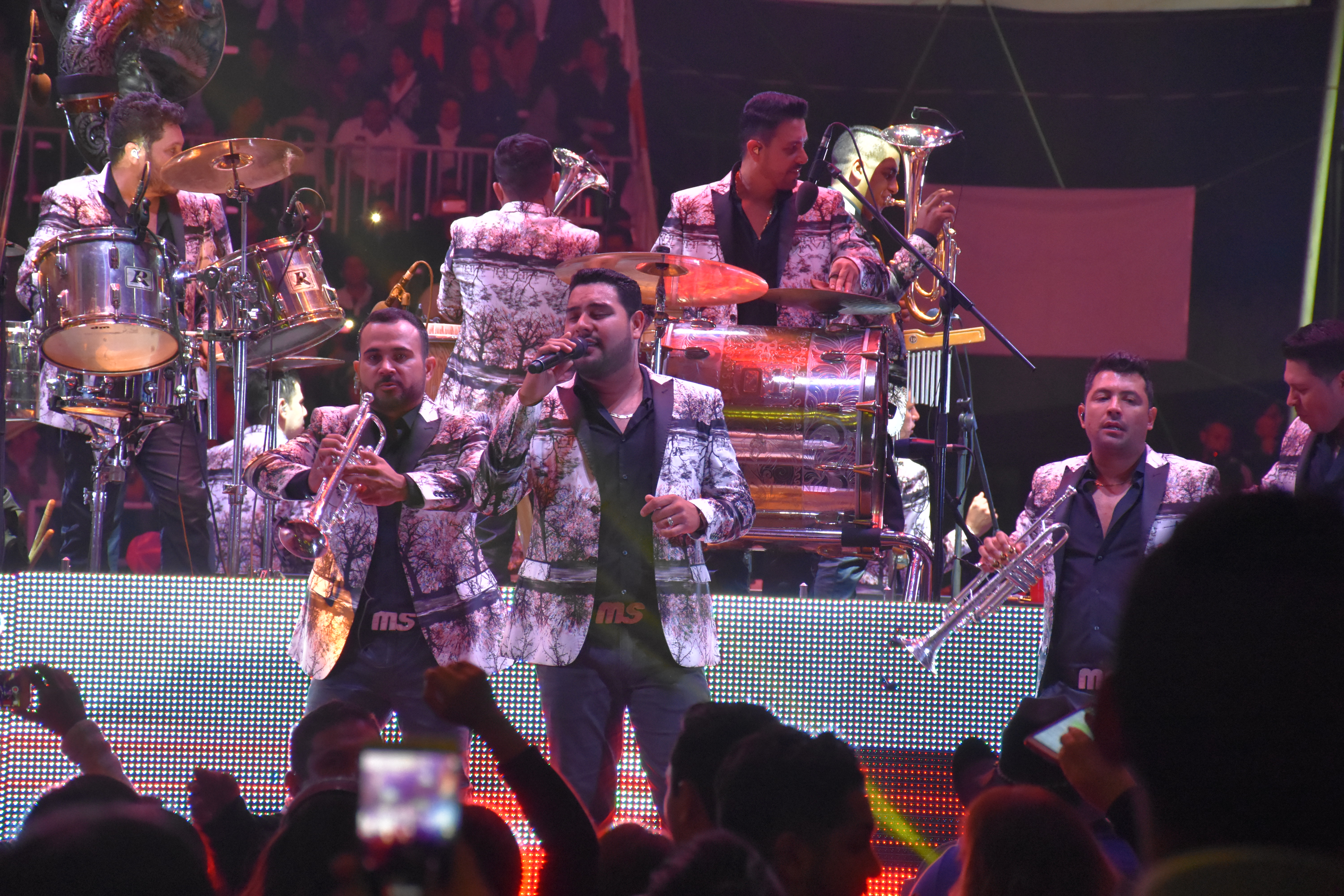
Banda MS was featured on Thalía's 2021 bonus track "Tu Boca".

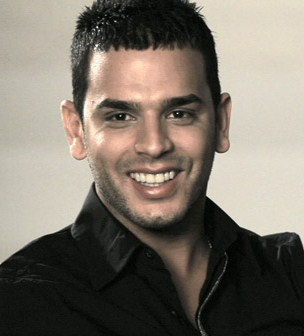
Tito El Bambino appears on the remix of Thalía's "Vuélveme a Querer" released in 2016.

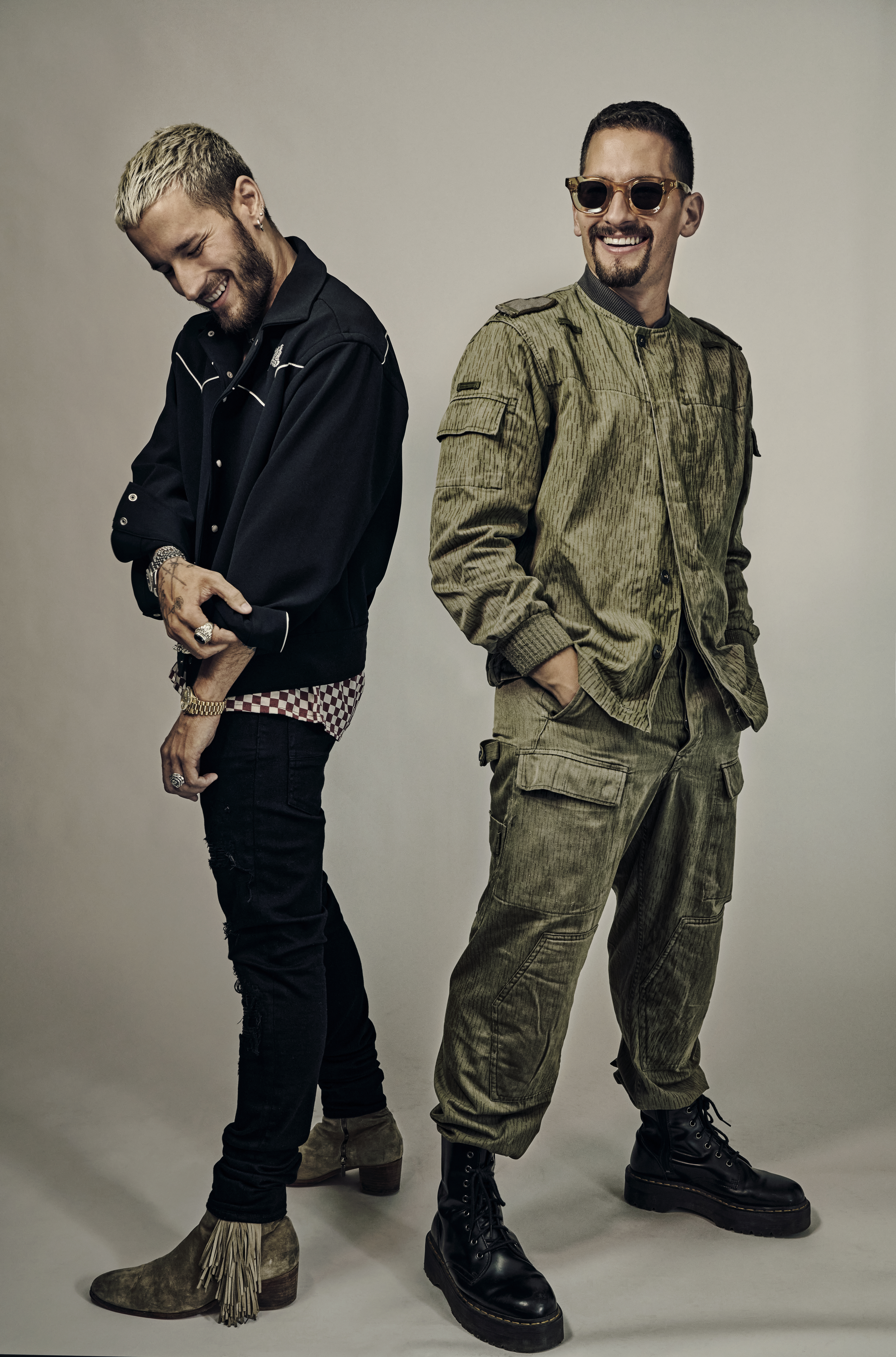
Mau y Ricky collaborated with Thalía on the single "Ya Tú Me Conoces" in 2020.

Key
≠	Indicates a song that appears on an alternative version of the album
±	Indicates a re-recording of a song Thalía has released previously in a different style and/or with different lyrics
†	Indicates a song Thalía has covered in its original language
‡	Indicates a song Thalía has covered by adapting it to a language different than the original
÷	Indicates a Spanish song that Thalía originally released in English
*	Indicates an English song that Thalía originally released in Spanish
§	Indicates a Portuguese song that Thalía originally released in Spanish
¶	Indicates a Tagalog song that Thalía originally released in Spanish
¡	Indicates a duet with a late artist that was part of a tribute album
‹›	Indicates a song recorded as part of a super group
∞	Indicates a song recorded live (with no studio version)
#	Indicates a song from a TV show or series
⟨⟩	Indicates a song that was released as part of a movie soundtrack
•	Indicates a children's song
~	Indicates an instrumental song

Released songs recorded by Thalía
Song	Other performer(s)	Writer(s)	Originating album	Year	Ref.
"24000 Besos" ‡		Adriano Celentano; Lucio Fulci; Piero Vivarelli; Estéfano (Spanish adaptation); Jose Luis Pagan	El Sexto Sentido	2005	
"A Dormir" •		Thalía; Marcela de la Garza; Armando Ávila; Juan Carlos Moguel; Fernando Laura; Francisco Oroz	Viva Kids, Vol. 2	2020	
"A Dream for Two" *		Thalía; Estéfano; Jose Luis Pagan; Alexandra Taveras; Shep Gordon	El Sexto Sentido	2005	
"A la Orilla del Mar"		Manuel Esperón; Ernesto Cortazar	Love	1992	
"¿A quién le importa?" †		Ignacio Canut Guillen; Carlos García Berlanga Manrique; Julio Reyes	Thalía (2002)	2002	
"A QUIEN LE IMPORTA (VERSION CUARTETO)" ±	Luck Ra	Ignacio Canut Guillen; Carlos García Berlanga Manrique; Julio Reyes	Non-album single	2026	
"Acción y Reacción"		Julio Reyes; Estéfano	Greatest Hits	2004	
"Aeróbico"		Luna Fría	Thalía (1990)	1990	
"Ahí"	Ana Mena	Daniel Echavarría Oviedo	Valiente	2018	
"Al Mundo Paz" †		George Frideric Handel; Isaac Watts	Navidad Melancólica	2024	
"Alguien Real" ÷		Thalía; Guy Roche; Kara DioGuardi	Thalía (2003)	2003	
"Amándote"		A.B. Quintanilla III; Ricky Vela	En éxtasis	1995	
"Amar sin ser amada"		Estéfano; Jose Luis Pagan; Gerardo Gardelin	El Sexto Sentido	2005	
"Amarillo Azul"		Luis Cabaña; Pablo Pinilla	Thalía (1990)	1990	
"Amiga Date Cuenta"	Ha*Ash	José Luis Roma; Áureo Baqueiro	Non-album single	2025	
"Amor a la Mexicana"		Mario Pupparo	Amor a la Mexicana	1997	
"Amor a la Mexicana" (2024) ±		Mario Pupparo Edgar Rodríguez	A Mucha Honra	2024	
"Amor a la Mexicana (Versión Banda)" ±		Mario Pupparo	Thalía con banda: Grandes éxitos	2001	
"Amor Prohibido" †		A.B. Quintanilla III; Pete Astudillo	El Sexto Sentido	2005	
"Amore Mío"		José Luis Roma; Armando Ávila	Amore Mío	2014	
"Another Girl"		Cathy Dennis; David Siegel; Steve Morales	Thalía (2003)	2003	
"Aquí Es Mi Lugar"	Grupo Máximo Grado	Thalia; Dania Ivana Valenzuela Roman; Juan Pablo Alcalá Gallego	Todo Suena Mejor en Cumbia	2026	
"Arrasando"		Thalía; Emilio Estefan; Lawrence Dermer; Robin Dermer	Arrasando	2000	
"Arrasando (Versión Banda)" ±		Thalía; Emilio Estefan; Lawrence Dermer; Robin Dermer	Thalía con banda: Grandes éxitos	2001	
"Así Es el Destino"		Julio Reyes; Estéfano	Thalía (2002)	2002	
"Así Fue" †	Arthur Hanlon	Juan Gabriel	Non-album single	2026	
"Atmósfera" ‡		Silvio Donizeti Rodrigues; Giuliano Matheus; Armando Ávila	Habítame Siempre ≠	2012	
"Aventurero"		Claudia Brant; Jean-Yves Ducornet; Drop Dead Beats	Lunada	2008	
"Ay Amor" † ∞		Mariano Pérez García; Carlos Gómez García; José Antonio García Morato Soto; Cheche Alara; Ed Calle; Carlos Murguía	Primera Fila... Un Año Después	2010	
"Ay Amor"	El Micha	José Carlos García; Jorge Gómez; Sergio George; Bilal Hajji; Yulien Oviedo; Michael F. Sierra Miranda; Bigram Zayas; Thalía	Valiente	2018	
"Baby, I'm in Love"		Guy Roche; Kara DioGuardi	Thalía (2003)	2003	
"Baila Así"	Play-N-Skillz; Becky G Chiquis Rivera	Thalía; Juan Salinas "Play"; Oscar Salinas "Skillz"; Gary Walker "Ski"; David Alberto Macías; Steven Máximo Céspedes; Emmanuel Anene; José Manuel del Rosario Rodríguez; Rebecca Marie Gomez; Janney Marín; Rodolfo Olivares	Non-album single	2021	
"Barrio"		Thalía; Jeffrey Peñalva	Desamorfosis	2021	
"Barrio Bravo en Navidad"		Thalia; Camilo Lara	Navidad Melancólica	2024	
"Bebé, Perdón"		Jimmy Humilde; Thomas Alexander Leavitt	A Mucha Honra	2023	
"Beijame" § ‡		Ricardo Montaner; Jorge Luis Chacín; Roberta Miranda (Portuguese adaptation)	Thalía (2013)	2013	
"Bendita"		Thalía; Luis Giraldo	Lunada	2008	
"Bésame" †		Ricardo Montaner; Jorge Luis Chacín; Cheche Alara	Habítame Siempre	2012	
"Bésame Mucho" †	Michael Bublé	Consuelo Velázquez	Habítame Siempre	2012	
"Blues Jam"		Thalía; Alfredo Díaz Ordaz	Mundo de Cristal	1991	
"Bolsito Caro"		Thalía; Santiago García Castaño; Johan E. Espionsa; Andrés D. Restrepo; Daniel Taborda Valencia; Duvalier A. Torres; Jorge A. Villa; Douglas J. Villasmil Tovar	Desamorfosis	2021	
"Boomerang"		Thalía; Emiliano Gomez	Todo Suena Mejor en Cumbia	2026	
"Brindis" † ∞		Afo Verde	Primera Fila	2009	
"Caballo de Palo" • †		Omar Alfanno	Viva Kids, Vol. 1	2014	
"Cancelado"		Thalía; Rafael Silva de Queiroz; Mercedes Pieretti	Desamorfosis	2021	
"CanCún"		Jimmy Humilde; Edgar Rodríguez	A Mucha Honra	2024	
"Canta, Canta, Canta" • ⟨⟩			Dora's Rescue in Mermaid Kingdom	2012	
"Cantando por un Sueño" #		Estéfano; Jimmy Rey	El Sexto Sentido (Re+Loaded)	2006	
"Cariño mío"		Thalia; Dania Ivana Valenzuela Roman	Todo Suena Mejor en Cumbia	2026	
"Cerca de Ti" ÷		David Siegel; Steve Morales; Gerina Di Marco	Thalía (2003)	2003	
"Cerveza en México"		Kenny Chesney; Armando Ávila; Marcela de la Garza	Amore Mío	2014	
"Chika Lang (El Venao)" ‡		Ramón Orlando Valoy; Larry Chua (Tagalog adaptation)	Nandito Ako	1997	
"Choro"	Estilo Sin Límite	Jimmy Humilde; Thomas Alexander Leavitt	A Mucha Honra	2023	
"Cien Años"		Rubén Fuentes; Alberto Cervantes	Love	1992	
"Closer to You"		Thalía; David Joseph Siegel; Steve Morales; Gerina Di Marco	Thalía (2002)	2002	
"Cómete Mi Boca"		Thalía; Marcela de la Garza; Armando Ávila	Amore Mío	2014	
"Cómo"		Leonel García; Thalía; Cheche Alara; Ed CalleCarlos Murguía	Primera Fila	2009	
"Como Tú No Hay Dos"	Becky G	A. Matheus10; Andy Clay; Rassel Marcano; Rebecca Marie Gomez; Lukasz Gottwald; Theron Thomas; Henry Water; Armando Ávila	Amore Mío	2014	
"Con Este Amor"		Ximena Muñoz; Max DiCarlo; Luigi Giraldo	Lunada	2008	
"Con La Duda"	Joan Sebastian	Joan Sebastian	Primera Fila	2009	
"Con Los Años Que Me Quedan" †	Leonel García; Samo; Jesús Navarro	Gloria Estefan; Emilio Estefan; Walter Afanasieff; Jorge Calandrelli	Habítame Siempre	2012	
"Contigo Quiero Estar" ‡		Clarence Coffee; Jordan Johnson; Marcus Lomax; Michael Biancaniello; Stefan Johnson; Thalía (Spanish adaptation)	Amore Mío	2014	
"Corazón, Corazón" ¡ †	José Alfredo Jiménez	José Alfredo Jiménez; Juan Carlos Calderón	Homenaje a José Alfredo Jiménez, Vol. 1	1998	
"Corazón Valiente"		Thalía; Daniel Giraldo; Andrés D. Restrepo Echavarría; Carlos A. Patiño Gómez; Johan E. Espinosa Cuervo; Salomón Villada Hoyos	Valiente	2018	
"Cosiéndome el Corazón" ∞		Raúl Ornelas; Roberto Ruiz Benhumea; Cheche Alara; Ed Calle; Carlos Murguía	Primera Fila	2009	
"Cristal (Instrumental)" ~		Alfredo Díaz Ordaz	Mundo de Cristal	1991	
"Cristo, Heme Aquí"		Marco Barrientos; Chuy Núñez; Armando Ávila	Non-album single	2021	
"Cuando Nadie Me Ve" †		Alejandro Sanz; Javier Losada	Y Si Fueran Ellas	2013	
"Cuando Seas Grande" †		Miguel Mateos; Áureo Baqueiro	Thalía's Mixtape	2023	
"Cuando Te Beso" †∞		Juan Luis Guerra; Cheche Alara; Ed Calle; Carlos Murguía	Primera Fila	2009	
"Cuando Tú Me Tocas"		Ricardo Gaitan; Alberto Gaitán; Maria Gabriela Porcell; Emilio Estefan	Greatest Hits	2004	
"Cuco Peña"		Memo Gil; Pancho Ruiz	Thalía con banda: Grandes éxitos	2001	
"Dance Dance (The Mexican)" *		Cory Rooney; J.C. Olivier; Samuel Barnes; Alan Shacklock	Thalía (2003)	2003	
"Dancing Queen" ‡		Bjoern K. Ulvaeus; Benny Göran Bror Andersson; Stig Erik Leopold Anderson	Todo Suena Mejor en Cumbia	2026	
"De Dónde Soy"		Karla Aponte; César Lemos	Amor a la Mexicana	1997	
"De Onde Sou" §		Karla Aponte; César Lemos	Amor a la Mexicana ≠	1997	
"De Qué Manera Te Olvido" ¡†	Rocío Dúrcal	Federico Méndez	Una Estrella en el Cielo	2010	
"De Ti"	Silvestre Dangond	Sergio George; Edgar Barrera; Joey Montana; Luis Ortega	Latina	2016	
"Déjame Escapar"		Áureo Baqueiro	Love	1992	
"Desde Esa Noche"	Maluma	María Adelaida Agudelo; Pablo Uribe; Mauricio Rengifo; Sergio George; Juan Luis Londoño Arias	Latina	2016	
"Desolvidándote"		Thalía; Jodi Marr; Dave Thomson; Ricardo E. Martínez	Lunada	2008	
"Devuélveme a mi chica" †	David Summers	David Summers; César Ceja; Áureo Baqueiro	Thalía's Mixtape	2023	
"Dicen Por Ahí"		Áureo Baqueiro	Amor a la Mexicana	1997	
"Diente" •		Thalía; Armando Ávila; Juan Carlos Moguel; Fernando Laura; Francisco Oroz; Pablo Arraya; Gaby Vega	Viva Kids, Vol. 2	2020	
"Dime Si Ahora"	Gilberto Santa Rosa	Beatriz Luengo; Yotuel Romero; Ahmed Barroso; Cheche Alara; Ángel Fernández	Habítame Siempre	2012	
"Don't Look Back"		Ash Howes; Martin Harrington; Rob Davies	Thalía (2003)	2003	
"Echa Pa' Lante"		Emilio Estefan; Javier Garza; Pablo Flores; Roberto Blades	Amor a la Mexicana	1997	
"El Baile de los Perros y los Gatos"		Alfredo Díaz Ordaz	Thalía (1990)	1990	
"El Bombo de Tu Corazón"		Áureo Baqueiro	Mundo de Cristal	1991	
"El Bronceador"		Luis Carlos Esteban	Love	1992	
"El Burrito Sabanero" • †		Hugo Cesar Blanco Manzo	Navidad Melancólica ≠	2026	
"El Día del Amor"		Luis Carlos Esteban	Love	1992	
"El Garabato Colorado" • †		Tulio Arnaldo De Rose; Carlos Luis Sobrino	Viva Kids, Vol. 1	2014	
"El Piojo y la Pulga" • †		Felipe Gil	Viva Kids, Vol. 1	2014	
"El Poder de Tu Amor"		Alfredo Díaz Ordaz	Thalía (1990)	1990	
"El Próximo Viernes" †∞		Espinoza Paz; Cheche Alara; Ed Calle; Carlos Murguía	Primera Fila	2009	
"El Último Adiós (The Last Goodbye)" ‹›	Various Artists	Gian Marco; Emilio Estefan; Hernan "Teddy" Mulet; Archie Peña	Non-album single	2001	
"Empecemos"		Thalía; Judith Buendía	Desamorfosis	2021	
"Empezar de ″0″"		Thalía	El Sexto Sentido	2005	
"En la Fiesta Mando Yo"		Julio Reyes; Estéfano	Thalía (2002)	2002	
"En la Intimidad"		Fernando Riba; Kiko Campos	Mundo de Cristal	1991	
"En Silencio"		Alfredo Díaz Ordaz	Mundo de Cristal	1991	
"En Ti"		Marco Barrientos; Chuy Núñez; Armando Ávila	Non-album single	2021	
"En un Bosque de la China" • †		Roberto Ratti; Benjamin Yankelevich	Viva Kids, Vol. 1	2014	
"Enemigos" †		Homero Aguilar; José Aguirre	Latina	2016	
"Enséñame a vivir" ∞		Reyli Barba; Cheche Alara; Ed Calle; Carlos Murgía	Primera Fila	2009	
"Entre el Mar y Arrasando"		Thalía; Emilio Estefan; Marco Flores; Lawrence Dermer; Robin Dermer	Thalía's Hits Remixed	2003	
"Entre el Mar y una Estrella"		Marco Flores	Arrasando	2000	
"Entre el Mar y una Estrella (Versión Banda)" ±		Marco Flores	Thalía con banda: Grandes éxitos	2001	
"Equivocada" ∞		Mario Domm; María Bernal; Cheche Alara; Ed Calle; Carlos Murguía; José Ángel Medina	Primera Fila	2009	
"Equivocada (Portuguese Version)" §		Mario Domm; María Bernal; César Lemos (Portuguese adaptation)	Thalía (2013)	2013	
"Eres Mío"		Luis Barrera; Edgar Barrera; Patrick Ingunza; Viviana Carolina Nava Ochoa	Desamorfosis	2021	
"Es Tu Amor"		Kike Santander	Amor a la Mexicana	1997	
"Es un Pedo" •		Thalía; Marcela de la Garza; Sabrina Sakae Mottola; Armando Ávila; Juan Carlos Moguel; Fernando Laura; Francisco Oroz	Viva Kids, Vol. 2	2020	
"Estou Apaixonado" § ‡	Daniel	Donato Poveda; Estéfano	Thalía (2013)	2013	
"Estoy Enamorado" †∞	Pedro Capó	Donato Poveda; Estéfano; Cheche Alara; Ed Calle; Carlos Murguía	Primera Fila	2009	
"Estoy Soltera"	Leslie Shaw; Farina	Leslie Shaw; Thalía; Antonio Cortés "Barullo"; Héctor Montaner; Claudia Virginia Prieto; Frank Santofimio; Vladi Ramírez; Alex Palmer; Farina Pao Paucar Franco Armando Lozano	Yo Soy Leslie Shaw	2020	
"Estrellita" • †		Manuel Ponce	Viva Kids, Vol. 1	2014	
"Fantasía"		Gabriela Anders	En éxtasis	1995	
"Feliz Navidad" • †		José Feliciano; Perry Botkin	Non-album single	2020	
"Flor de Juventud"		Thalía; Luis Carlos Esteban	Love	1992	
"Florecita Rockera" †	Aterciopelados; Leon Leiden	Héctor Buitrago; Áureo Baqueiro	Thalía's Mixtape	2023	
"Flores Secas En la Piel"		Luis Carlos Esteban	Love	1992	
"Frutas"	Chiky Bom Bom "La Pantera"	Sergio George; Cory Rooney; Marcela de la Garza; Tommy Mottola; Lissette Eduardo Cleto; Thalía	Latina	2016	
"Fuego Cruzado"		Luis Cabaña; Pablo Pinilla	Mundo de Cristal	1991	
"Gracias"		Thalía; Marcela de la Garza; Armando Ávila	Amore Mío ≠	2014	
"Gracias a Dios"		Alberto Aguilera Valadez	En éxtasis	1995	
"Gracias a Dios (Versión Banda)" ±		Alberto Aguilera Valadez	Thalía con banda: Grandes éxitos	2001	
"Habítame Siempre"		Mario Domm; María Bernal; Cheche Alara	Habítame Siempre	2012	
"Heridas en el Alma"		Julio Reyes; Estéfano; Cory Rooney	Thalía (2002)	2002	
"Hey, It's Me" †		Jamie Rivera; Jimmy Antiporda	Nandito Ako	1997	
"Hoy Ten Miedo de Mí" †		Fernando Delgadillo; Cheche Alara	Habítame Siempre ≠	2012	
"I Found Your Love" *		Alberto Aguilera Valadez; Joel Duma (English Adaptation)	Nandito Ako	1997	
"I Want You"	Fat Joe	Thalía; Brenda Russell; Cory Rooney; Davy Deluge; Gregory Bruno; Joseph Cartagena	Thalía (2003)	2003	
"Insensible" †		Alberto Aguilera Valadez; Ricardo E. Martínez	Lunada	2008	
"Isla para Dos"		Álvaro Rey; Nano Cabrera; Ricardo E. Martínez	Lunada	2008	
"It's My Party" *		Thalía; Lawrence Dermer; Robin Dermer; Emilio Estefan	Thalía's Hits Remixed	2003	
"Iuuuuu" •		Thalía; Marcela de la Garza; Armando Ávila; Juan Carlos Moguel; Fernando Laura; Francisco Oroz	Viva Kids, Vol. 2	2020	
"Jollie Madame"		Thalía	Mundo de Cristal	1991	
"Joy to the World" ‡		Isaac Watts	Non-album single	2024	
"Juana"		Myra Stella Turner	En éxtasis	1995	
"Juana" (Tagalog version) ¶		Myra Stella Turner	Nandito Ako	1997	
"Junto a Ti (En Vivo)" † ∞	Sasha, Benny y Erik	Guillermo Méndez Guiu; Anahí Van Zandweghe	Non-album single	2017	
"La Apuesta" †	Erik Rubín	Beatriz Herraiz; Armando Ávila	Habítame Siempre ≠	2012	
"La Canción de la Efe" •		Thalía; Marcela de la Garza; Armando Ávila; Juan Carlos Moguel; Fernando Laura; Francisco Oroz	Viva Kids, Vol. 2	2020	
"La Loca"		Emilio Estefan; Emilio Regueira; Randall Barlow	Thalía (2002)	2002	
"La Luz"	Myke Towers	Thalía; Myke Towers; Alberto Meléndez; Manuel Lara; Marco Masis; Christopher Ramos; Maria Cristina Chiluiza; Alejandro Borrero; Ivanni Rodríguez	Desamorfosis	2020	
"La Movidita"		Amérika Jiménez; Antonio Rayo Gibo "Rayito"; Sergio George; José Aguirre	Latina	2016	
"La Muralla Verde" †	Ben Carrillo; Bruses	Marciano Cantero; Daniel Piccolo; César Ceja; Áureo Baqueiro	Thalía's Mixtape	2023	
"La Reina Presenta"	Karol G	Karol G Thalía	Tropicoqueta	2025	
"La Revancha"		Memo Gil; Pancho Ruiz	Thalía con banda: Grandes éxitos	2001	
"La Risa de las Vocales" • †		Tirzo Camacho Paiz	Viva Kids, Vol. 1	2014	
"La Super Chica"		Chris Rodríguez; Michael Cosculluela; Lilly Ponce	El Sexto Sentido (Re+Loaded)	2006	
"La Tierra de Nunca Jamás"		Alfredo Díaz Ordaz	Thalía (1990)	1990	
"La Vacuna" •		Thalía; Marcela de la Garza; Armando Ávila; Juan Carlos Moguel; Fernando Laura; Francisco Oroz	Viva Kids, Vol. 2	2020	
"La Vie en rose (La Vida En Rosa)" ‡		Édith Piaf; Mack David; Louiguy; Luis Carlos Esteban (Spanish Adaptation)	Love	1992	
"Lágrimas"		Thalía; Áureo Baqueiro	En éxtasis	1995	
"Las Mañanitas" • †		Tradicional Mexicana; Armando Ávila	Viva Kids, Vol. 1	2014	
"Lento"	Gente de Zona	Omar Alfanno; Sergio George; Julio Reyes Copello; Jorge Luis Chacín; Edgar Barrera; Andrés Castro; Jon Leone; Alexander Delgado Hernández; Randy Martínez Amey Malcom	Valiente	2018	
"Libertad de Expresión"		Áureo Baqueiro	Thalía (1990)	1990	
"Lindo Pero Bruto"	Lali	Óscar "Oscarcito" Hernández; Edgar Barrera; Andrés Castro; Jesús Herrera; Patrick Ingunza	Valiente	2018	
"Llévame Contigo"		Adrián Posse; Rolando Hernández	En éxtasis	1995	
"Lo Más Bonito de Ti"		José Luis Roma; Armando Ávila	Amore Mío	2014	
"Lo Siento Mucho (Versión Mariachi)"	Río Roma	José Luis Roma	Non-album single	2020	
"Loca"		Estéfano; Jose Luis Pagan; Gerardo Gardelin	El Sexto Sentido	2005	
"Lograrás Hacerlo" ⟨⟩		Lynn Ahrens; Stephen Flaherty	Anastasia (Original Movie Soundtrack)	1997	
"Los Reyes Magos" •		Thalía; Marcela de la Garza; Armando Ávila; Juan Carlos Moguel; Fernando Laura; Francisco Oroz	Viva Kids, Vol. 2	2020	
"Love"		Luis Carlos Esteban	Love	1992	
"Love Me Tender (Viva Elvis)" ¡ †	Elvis Presley	Elvis Presley; Ken Darby	Love Me Tender Duets – Viva Elvis Collection	2010	
"Lucha de Gigantes" †		Antonio Vega; Iván Rodríguez; Áureo Baqueiro	Thalía's Mixtape	2023	
"Madrid"		Alfredo Díaz Ordaz	Mundo de Cristal	1991	
"Mal y Bien"		Thalía; Johan Esteban Espinosa; Andrés D. Restrepo Echavarría; Yoel Henríquez; Pablo Preciado	Desamorfosis	2021	
"Manías"		Raúl Ornelas; Cheche Alara	Habítame Siempre	2012	
"Manias (Portuguese Version)" §		Raúl Ornelas; Juliana Leite Arantes (Portuguese adaptation)	Thalía (2013)	2013	
"María la del Barrio" #		Viviana Pimstein; Paco Navarrete	En éxtasis	1995	
"María la del Barrio (Versión Banda)" ±		Viviana Pimstein; Paco Navarrete	Thalía con banda: Grandes éxitos	2001	
"María Mercedes" #		Viviana Pimstein; Paco Navarrete	Love	1992	
"Mariang Taga Barrio (María la del Barrio)" ¶		Viviana Pimstein; Paco Navarrete; Larry Chua (Tagalog adaptation)	Nandito Ako	1997	
"Marimar" #		Viviana Pimstein; Paco Navarrete	Marimar (EP)	1994	
"Más"		Thalía; Marcela de la Garza; Armando Ávila	Amore Mío	2014	
"Me Cuesta Tanto Olvidarte" †		José María Cano; Áureo Baqueiro	Thalía's Mixtape	2023	
"Me Dediqué a Perderte" †	Leonel García	Leonel García; Áureo Baqueiro	Todas Mías...	2013	
"Me Erotizas" ‡		Vline Buggy; Julien Lepers; Thalía (Spanish adaptation)	En éxtasis	1995	
"Me Faltas Tú"		Kike Santander	En éxtasis	1995	
"Me Fui Queriéndote"	Matisse	Thalia; Horacio Palencia; Diego Bolela	Todo Suena Mejor en Cumbia	2026	
"Me Matas"		Pablo Pinilla	Mundo de Cristal	1991	
"Me Oyen, Me Escuchan"		Thalía	Valiente	2018	
"Me Pones Sexy" ÷	Fat Joe	Thalía; Brenda Russell; Cory Rooney; Davy Deluge; Gregory Bruno; Joseph Cartagena	Thalía (2003)	2003	
"Medley" ∞		Estéfano; Kike Santander; Marco Flores; Mario Pupparo; Julio Reyes; Cheche Alara; Ed Calle; Carlos Murguía	Primera Fila	2009	
"Menino Lindo (Menina Linda)" †		Luciano Sotelino	Amor a la Mexicana ≠	1997	
"Menta y Canela"		Thalía; Pérez Prado	Arrasando	2000	
"Mi No Cumpleaños" •		Thalía; Marcela de la Garza; Armando Ávila; Juan Carlos Moguel; Fernando Laura; Francisco Oroz	Viva Kids, Vol. 2	2020	
"Miedo-Terror" •		Thalía; Armando Ávila; Juan Carlos Moguel; Fernando Laura; Francisco Oroz; Pablo Arraya; Gaby Vega	Viva Kids, Vol. 2	2020	
"MIRO TU CARA EN LA LUNA"	Grupo Máximo Grado	Christian Michelle Felix Felix	Non-album single	2026	
"Mis Deseos / Feliz Navidad" †	Michael Bublé	Alan Chang; Claudia Brant; Humberto Gatica; José Feliciano; Brad Dechter	Christmas	2011	
"Mis Tradiciones" •		Thalía; Marcela de la Garza; Armando Ávila; Juan Carlos Moguel; Fernando Laura; Francisco Oroz	Viva Kids, Vol. 2	2020	
"Misbehavin'"		Cathy Dennis; David Siegel; Steve Morales	Thalía (2003)	2003	
"Mixtape Medley"		Carlos Alberto García; Miguel Mateos; Pablo Carbonell; Roberto Casas Torres; José Luis Moure Alonso; Áureo Baqueiro	Thalía's Mixtape	2023	
"Mojito"		Thalía; Rafael Rodríguez; Daniel Rondon; Andrea Mangiamarchi	Desamorfosis	2021	
"Mujer Latina"		Kike Santander	Amor a la Mexicana	1997	
"Mujeres" †∞		Ricardo Arjona; Cheche Alara; Ed Calle; Carlos Murguía	Primera Fila	2009	
"Mujeres (En Vivo)" †∞	María José	Ricardo Arjona; Cheche Alara; Ed Calle; Carlos Murguía	Viva Tour	2013	
"Mundo de Cristal"		Alfredo Díaz Ordaz	Mundo de Cristal	1991	
"Muñequita Linda (Te Quiero, Dijiste)" †	Robbie Williams	María Grever; Cheche Alara	Habítame Siempre	2012	
"Nació la Luz"	Marcos Witt	Thalia; Marcos Witt; Steven Daniel Richards	Navidad Melancólica	2024	
"Nandito Ako" †		Aaron Paul del Rosario	Nandito Ako	1997	
"No Es el Momento"		Áureo Baqueiro	Love	1992	
"No Hay Que Llorar"		Thalía; Lawrence Dermer	Arrasando	2000	
"No Me Acuerdo"	Natti Natasha	Frank Santofimio; Óscar "Oscarcito" Hernández; Jon Leone; Yasmil Marrufo; Mario Cáceres; Germán Hernández; Rafael Pina; Juan G. Rivera Vázquez; Natalia Gutiérrez Batista	Valiente	2018	
"No me enseñaste"		Julio Reyes; Estéfano	Thalía (2002)	2002	
"No Me Voy a Quebrar"		Estéfano; Jose Luis Pagan	El Sexto Sentido	2005	
"No, No, No"	Romeo Santos	Romeo Santos	El Sexto Sentido (Re+Loaded)	2006	
"No Puedo Vivir Sin Ti"		Estéfano; Jose Luis Pagan	El Sexto Sentido	2005	
"No Quiero Verduras" •		Thalía; Marcela de la Garza; Armando Ávila; Juan Carlos Moguel; Fernando Laura; Francisco Oroz	Viva Kids, Vol. 2	2020	
"No Se Trata de Ganar" •		Thalía; Marcela de la Garza; Armando Ávila; Juan Carlos Moguel; Fernando Laura; Francisco Oroz	Viva Kids, Vol. 2	2020	
"No Soy el Aire" †		Miguel Luna; Cheche Alara	Habítame Siempre	2012	
"No Te Vi"	Maffio	Thalía; Carlos A. Peralta Mendoza; Andy Bauza; Ricardo Quintero; Andy Clay; Sabino Omar Luis; Alexia Valle	Desamorfosis	2021	
"No Trates de Engañarme"		Álex de la Nuez	Love	1992	
"Noches Sin Luna"		Kike Santander; José Miguel Velásquez	Amor a la Mexicana	1997	
"Noches Sin Luna (Versión Banda)" ±		Kike Santander; José Miguel Velásquez	Thalía con banda: Grandes éxitos	2001	
"Noites Sem Lua" §		Kike Santander; José Miguel Velásquez	Amor a la Mexicana ≠	1997	
"Nueva Herida"	Valen	Thalia; Valentín Vargas; Horacio Palencia	Todo Suena Mejor en Cumbia	2026	
"Nueva Navidad"		Thalia; Olga Lara	Navidad Melancólica	2024	
"Nunca Sabrás (How Much, How Much I Love You)" ‡		Alec R. Constandinos; Luis Carlos Esteban (Spanish Adaptation)	Love	1992	
"Ojalá"		Andrés Castro; Omar Alfanno; Édgar Barrera; Cheche Alara; Harry Kim	Habítame Siempre	2012	
"Ojitos Mexicanos"		Thalia; Rodolfo Lugo; Carla Andrea López Zúñiga; Juan José Martín Martín; Marcela Morelo	Todo Suena Mejor en Cumbia	2025	
"Olvídame"		Julio Reyes; Estéfano	El Sexto Sentido	2005	
"Olvídame"		Carlos Macías; Armando Ávila	Amore Mío	2014	
"Osito Carpintero" • †		Felipe Bermejo Araujo; Manuel Esperón	Viva Kids, Vol. 1	2014	
"Pa' la Cultura" ‹›	David Guetta; HUMAN(X); Sofía Reyes; Abraham Mateo; De la Ghetto; Manuel Turizo; Zion & Lennox; Lalo Ebratt; Maejor; Tainy	Sofía Reyes; Abraham Mateo; Manuel Turizo; Thalía; Alejandro Borrero et al.	Non-album single	2020	
"Pachuco" †	Roco Pachukote	Rolando J. Ortega Cuenca; José L. Paredes Pacho; Enrique Montes Arellano; Eulalio Cervantes Galarza; Aldo R. Acuna Yance; César Ceja; Áureo Baqueiro	Thalía's Mixtape	2023	
"Para No Verte Más" †	Kenia Os	Guillermo Novellis; Pablo Tisera	Thalía's Mixtape	2023	
"Para Qué Celarme"		Dania Ivana Valenzuela Román; Edgar Rodríguez	A Mucha Honra	2024	
"Pata Pata" †		Edgardo Franco; Miriam Makeba; Jerry Ragovoy	Arrasando	2000	
"Pena Negra" †		Homero Aguilar; José Aguirre; Juan Salazar	Latina	2016	
"Persiana Americana" †		Gustavo Cerati; Jorge Antonio Daffunchio; Áureo Baqueiro	Thalía's Mixtape	2023	
"Piel morena"		Kike Santander	En éxtasis	1995	
"Piel morena (Hitsmaker Remix)" ±		Kike Santander	Thalía's Hits Remixed	2003	
"Piel morena (Versión Banda)" ±		Kike Santander	Thalía con banda: Grandes éxitos	2001	
"Pienso en Ti"		Áureo Baqueiro	Thalía (1990)	1990	
"Ponle Remedio"		Roberto Blades	Amor a la Mexicana	1997	
"Poquita Fe"		Bobby Capó; José Aguirre; Juan Salazar	Latina	2016	
"Por Amor"		Kike Santander	Amor a la Mexicana	1997	
"Por Amor (Versión Banda)" ±		Kike Santander	Thalía con banda: Grandes éxitos	2001	
"Por Amor al Arte" †		Iván Guevara Lozano	Valiente	2018	
"Por Lo Que Reste De Vida"		Ricky Montaner; Armando Ávila	Amore Mío	2014	
"Por Qué"		Thalía; Rafael Silva de Queiroz	Desamorfosis	2021	
"Psyco Bitch"		Thalía; Jonas Jurström; Victor Thell; Carolina I. Colón Juarbe; Daniela Blau	Non-album single	2022	
"Qué Ironía"	Carlos Rivera	Thalía; Servando Primera; Yasmil Marrufo; Mario Cáceres	Valiente	2018	
"Qué Será de Ti (Como Vai Você)" †∞		Antonio Marcos; Cheche Alara; Ed Calle; Carlos Murguía	Primera Fila	2009	
"Qué Será de Ti (Como Vai Você) – Banda Version" †		Antonio Marcos; Cheche Alara; Ed Calle; Carlos Murguía	Non-album single	2010	
"Quién Será" †	Julio Iglesias	Luis Demetrio; Norman Gimbel; Pablo Beltrán Ruiz; Julio Iglesias; José Domenech	México & Amigos	2017	
"Quiero Amarte"		Thalía; Lawrence Dermer; Robin Dermer	Arrasando	2000	
"Quiero Hacerte el Amor"		Daniela García; Mario Schajris	En éxtasis	1995	
"Quiero Hacerte el Amor (Versión Banda)" ±		Daniela García; Mario Schajris	Thalía con banda: Grandes éxitos	2001	
"Quinceañera" †		Guillermo Méndez Guiu; Álvaro Dávila	Non-album single	2017	
"Rayando el Sol" †		Alejandro González; Fernando Olvera; César Ceja; Áureo Baqueiro	Thalía's Mixtape	2023	
"Reencarnación"		Thalía; Lawrence Dermer; Robi Draco Rosa	Arrasando	2000	
"Regalo Perfecto"		Thalía; Adrián Cota; Tito Urías	Navidad Melancólica ≠	2026	
"Regalito de Dios"		Edgar Alfredo Zabaleta; Cheche Alara	Habítame Siempre	2012	
"Regresa a Mí"		Thalía; Angie Chirino; Emilio Estefan; Lawrence Dermer; Robin Dermer	Arrasando	2000	
"Rosalinda" #		Kike Santander	Arrasando	2000	
"Rosalinda (Versión Banda)" ±		Kike Santander	Thalía con banda: Grandes éxitos	2001	
"Rosas"		Héctor Martínez; Mario Pupparo	Amor a la Mexicana	1997	
"Sabe Bien"		Julio C. Reyes; Estéfano	El Sexto Sentido	2005	
"Saliva"		Thalía; Alfredo Díaz Ordaz	Thalía (1990)	1990	
"Salto" •		Thalía; Marcela de la Garza; Armando Ávila; Juan Carlos Moguel; Fernando Laura; Francisco Oroz	Viva Kids, Vol. 2	2020	
"Sangre"		Thalía	Love	1992	
"Sangre Caliente"		Marcelo Delgado; Darío Ungaro; Ricardo E. Martínez	Lunada	2008	
"SANTA (Crush on You)"		Thalía; Adrian Cota; Cory Rooney	Non-album single	2025	
"SANTA (Tengo un Crush Contigo)"		Thalía; Adrian Cota; Cory Rooney	Non-album single	2025	
"Save the Day"		Thalía; Steve Morales; David Siegel; Kara DioGuardi; Lincoln C. Browder	Thalía (2003)	2003	
"Secreto"	Jhayco	Thalía; Marco Masis	Desamorfosis	2021	
"Seducción"		Estéfano; Jose Luis Pagan	El Sexto Sentido	2005	
"Seduction" *		Thalía; Estéfano; Jose Luis Pagan; Alexandra Taveras; Shep Gordon	El Sexto Sentido	2005	
"Será Porque Te Amo" †		Enzo Ghinazzi; Daniele Pace; Dario Farina; Luis Gómez-Escolar (Spanish adaptation); Luigi Giraldo	Lunada	2008	
"Si Alguna Vez" #		J. Eduardo Murguía; Mauricio L. Arriaga	Non-album single	2015	
"Siempre Hay Cariño"		Angie Chirino; Emilio Estefan; Roberto Blades	Arrasando	2000	
"Silencio"		Jimmy Humilde; Edgar Rodríguez	A Mucha Honra	2024	
"Sino a ti"	Laura Pausini	Laura Pausini; Paolo Carta; Niccolò Agliardi; Jorge Cristóbal Ballesteros	20 Grandes Éxitos ≠	2014	
"Solo Se Vive una Vez"		Thalía; Adrian Santalla; Lionel de la O Drop Dead Beats	Lunada	2008	
"Sólo Parecía Amor"		José Luis Roma; Armando Ávila	Amore Mío	2014	
"Somos el Mundo 25 por Haití" ‹›‡	Artistas por Haití		Non-album single	2010	
"Sube, Sube"	Fonseca	Servando Primera; Yasmil Marrufo; Andrés Castro; Andy Clay Cruz Felipe	Valiente	2018	
"Sudor (Parte I y II)"		Alfredo Díaz Ordaz	Mundo de Cristal	1991	
"Suerte En Mí"		Thalía; Emilio Estefan; Lawrence Dermer	Arrasando	2000	
"Sugar Rush" • †		Yasushi Akimoto; James Scoggin; Jamie Houston	Viva Kids, Vol. 1	2014	
"(Thalisman) Talismán"		Alfredo Díaz Ordaz	Thalía (1990)	1990	
"Te Dejé la Puerta Abierta"		Adrián Posse; B.B. Muñoz	En éxtasis	1995	
"Te Encontraré"		Cory Rooney; Mitchell Delgado; Alejandro Fernández Delgado; Isaac Delgado	Latina	2016	
"Te Necesito"		Alfredo Díaz Ordaz	Mundo de Cristal	1991	
"Te Perdiste Mi Amor"	Prince Royce	Geoffrey Rojas; Guianko Gómez; Jorge Luis Chacín; Efrain "Junito" Davila	Habítame Siempre	2012	
"Te Quiero Tanto"		Eddie Sierra	En éxtasis	1995	
"Te Va a Doler"	Grupo Firme	Jimmy Humilde; Edgar Rodríguez	A Mucha Honra	2024	
"Te Va a Doler (Deorro Remix)"		Jimmy Humilde; Edgar Rodríguez	A Mucha Honra	2024	
"Tell Me" †		Louie Ocampo; Allan Ayque	Nandito Ako	1997	
"Tema Alegre de Marimar" ~ #		Paco Navarrete	Marimar (EP)	1994	
"Tema de Amor de Marimar" ~ #		Paco Navarrete	Marimar (EP)	1994	
"Tema de Chupi" •		Armando Ávila; Marcela de la Garza Thalía	Viva Kids, Vol. 1	2014	
"Tema Triste de Marimar" ~ #		Paco Navarrete	Marimar (EP)	1994	
"Ten Cuidao"	Farina	Thalía; Farina; Egbert Rosa Cintrón; Erick A. Celis Marín; Jean C. Hernández Espinell; Siggy Vázquez Rodríguez	Non-album single	2020	
"Ten Paciencia"		Descemer Bueno; Magilee Álvarez; Cynthia Salazar	Lunada	2008	
"Ten Paciencia (Regueton Remix)"	Daddy Yankee	Descemer Bueno; Magilee Álvarez; Cynthia Salazar Daddy Yankee	Non-album single	2009	
"Tender Kisses" †		Viktoria; Rica Arambulo	Nandito Ako	1997	
"Tengo Lo Que Quiero"		Thalia; Orlando Vitto; Carlos Santander; Renzo Bravo; Alexa Zabala	Navidad Melancólica	2024	
"The Mexican (Dance Dance)"		Cory Rooney; J.C. Olivier; Samuel Barnes; Alan Shacklock	Thalía's Hits Remixed	2003	
"The Mexican 2002"	Marc Anthony	Cory Rooney; J.C. Olivier; Samuel Barnes; Alan Shacklock	Thalía (2002)	2002	
"The Mexican 2002 (English Version)" *		Cory Rooney; J.C. Olivier; Samuel Barnes; Alan Shacklock	Thalía (2002)	2002	
"The Way You Look Tonight" †	Tony Bennett	Jerome Kern; Dorothy Fields; Thalía (Adaptation)	Viva Duets	2012	
"TICK TOCK"	Farina; Sofía Reyes	Thalía; Andy Clay; Farina; Úrsula Sofía Reyes; Viviana Baptista; Santiago Castillo; Luigi Castillo; Daniel Rondon	Desamorfosis	2020	
"Tiki Tiki Ta (Uno Momento)" ‡		Filip Miletic; Milos Roganovic; Marcela de la Garza (Spanish adaptation); Thalía (Spanish adaptation); Dan Warner	Latina	2016	
"Tímida"	Pabllo Vittar	Rodrigo Gorky; Danielle Sanchez; Zebu; GALE; Pablo Bispo; ARTHUR MARQUES; Maffalda	111	2020	
"Toda La Felicidad" ÷		Ash Howes; Martin Harrington; Rob Davies	Thalía (2003)	2003	
"Todavía Te Quiero"		De la Ghetto; Sergio George; Mauricio Rengifo; Sebastian Obando Giraldo	Latina	2016	
"Todo (Poso Se Thelo)"	Omi; Jacob Forever	Thalía; Omi; Jacob Forever; Sergio George; Sharo Torres; Beatriz César	Latina	2016	
"Todo Es Posible"		Pete Astudillo; A.B. Quintanilla III	Voces Unidas	1996	
"Todo Me Gusta"	Carlos Vives	Carlos Vives; Andrés Castro	VIVES	2017	
"Todo Para Ti" ‹›	All Stars	Michael Jackson; Rubén Blades (Spanish adaptation)	Non-album single	2002	
"Todo, Todo, Todo" †	Yuri	Jorge Salinas Cisneros	Todo Suena Mejor en Cumbia	2026	
"Tómame o Déjame" †		Juan Carlos Calderón; Cheche Alara	Habítame Siempre	2012	
"Tranquila"	Fat Joe	Thalía; Marcela de la Garza; Andrés Guardado; Joseph Cartagena; Armando Ávila	Amore Mío	2014	
"Triángulo" †	Los Baby's	Bobby Capó	Tributo a	2017	
"Troca"	Ángela Aguilar	Thalía; Jimmy Humilde	A Mucha Honra	2024	
"Tu Amor"		Beatriz Luengo; Yotuel Romero; Ahmed Barroso; Cheche Alara	Habítame Siempre ≠	2012	
"Tu Amor"	Rave Jesus	Thalía; Christopher Jones; Kevin Odnoralov	Non-album single	2025	
"Tu Boca"	Banda MS de Sergio Lizárraga	Thalía; Horacio Palencia; Edgar Barrera	Desamorfosis	2021	
"Tú Me Sientas Tan Bien"	Dabruk	David Augustave Picanes; Bruno Nicolás Fernández; María Josefa Fernández; José Luis de la Peña; Liza Quintana; Dabruk	Valiente	2018	
"Tú Puedes Ser"		Thalía; José Luis Roma; Armando Ávila	Amore Mío ≠	2014	
"Tú y Yo"		Julio C. Reyes; Yeinel Reyes Gómez; Estefano	Thalía (2002)	2002	
"Tú y Yo"		Marcela de la Garza; Baltazar Hinojosa; Orlando Vitto; Armando Ávila	Amore Mío	2014	
"Tú y Yo (Cumbia Remix)"		A.B. Quintanilla; Kumbia Kings; Julio C. Reyes; Yeinel Reyes Gómez; Estefano	Thalía (2002)	2002	
"Tú y Yo (English Version)" *		Julio C. Reyes; Yeinel Reyes Gómez; Estéfano; Kara DioGuardi	Thalía (2003)	2003	
"Tumba la Casa"		Thalía; Lawrence Dermer; Luis Tineo; Norberto Cotto	Arrasando	2000	
"Un alma sentenciada"		Estéfano; Jose Luis Pagan; Gerardo Gardelin	El Sexto Sentido	2005	
"Un Pacto Entre los Dos"		Thalía; Alfredo Díaz Ordaz	Thalía (1990)	1990	
"Un Sueño para Dos"		Estéfano; Jose Luis Pagan	El Sexto Sentido	2005	
"Una Cucaracha" •		Thalía; Marcela de la Garza; Armando Ávila; Juan Carlos Moguel; Fernando Laura; Francisco Oroz	Viva Kids, Vol. 2	2020	
"Una Vez en Diciembre" ⟨⟩		Lynn Ahrens; Stephen Flaherty	Anastasia (Original Movie Soundtrack)	1997	
Untitled Hidden Track			Thalía (2002)	2002	
"Vamos a Jugar" • †		Lorenzo Antonio Sánchez	Viva Kids, Vol. 1	2014	
"Vamos Órale"		Servando Primera Thalía; Mario Cáceres; Sergio George	Valiente	2018	
"Velitas"		Thalia; Orlando Vitto; Carlos Santander; Renzo Bravo; Alexa Zabala	Navidad Melancólica	2024	
"Vete"		Leonel García; Thalía; Cheche Alara	Habítame Siempre ≠	2012	
"Viagem Ao Passado" ⟨⟩ §		Lynn Ahrens; Stephen Flaherty; William D. Brohn	Anastasia (Original Movie Soundtrack)	1997	
"Viaje Tiempo Atrás" ⟨⟩		Lynn Ahrens; Stephen Flaherty; William D. Brohn	Anastasia (Original Movie Soundtrack)	1997	
"Vikingo"		Thalía; Daniel Giraldo; Andrés D. Restrepo Echavarría; Carlos A. Patiño Gómez; Johan E. Espinosa Cuervo; Salomón Villada Hoyos	Valiente	2018	
"Vivir Junto a Ti"		Marcela de la Garza; Thalía; Sergio George	Latina	2016	
"Vueltas En el Aire"		Julio Reyes; Estéfano	Thalía (2002)	2002	
"Vuélveme a Querer"		Sergio George; Mauricio Rengifo; Armando Ávila; Andrés Torres	Latina	2016	
"Vuélveme a Querer (Remix)"	Tito "El Bambino"	Sergio George; Mauricio Rengifo; Andy Clay	Non-album single	2016	
"What More Can I Give?" ‹›	Michael Jackson; All Stars	Michael Jackson	Non-album single	2002	
"What's It Gonna Be Boy?"		Cory Rooney; Steve Morales	Thalía (2003)	2003	
"Y Seguir"		Julio Reyes; Estéfano	Thalía (2002)	2002	
"Ya lo Sabía" ∞		Leonel García; Thalía; Cheche Alara; Ed Calle; Carlos Murguía	Primera Fila	2009	
"Ya Tú Me Conoces"	Mau y Ricky	Edgar Barrera; Jon Leone; Camilo Echeverry; Ricardo Montaner; Mauricio Montaner; Luis Angel O'Neill; Víctor Viera Moore	Desamorfosis	2020	
"Yo Me Lo Busqué"	Los Ángeles Azules		Todo Suena Mejor en Cumbia	2025	
"Yo No Sé Vivir"		Magilee Álvarez; Descemer Bueno; Cynthia Salazar; Drop Dead Beats	Lunada	2008	
"Yo Puedo Sola" •		Thalía; Marcela de la Garza; Sabrina Sakae Mottola; Armando Ávila; Juan Carlos Moguel; Fernando Laura; Francisco Oroz	Viva Kids, Vol. 2	2020	
"You Are Still on My Mind" *		Daniel García; Mario Shajris; Ismael Ledezma (English adaptation)	Nandito Ako	1997	
"You Know He Never Loved You" *		Thalía; Estéfano; Jose Luis Pagan	El Sexto Sentido	2005	
"You Spin Me 'Round" †		Stephen Coy; Tim Lever; Mike Percy; Pete Burns	Thalía (2002)	2002	

== Songs recorded as part of a band ==
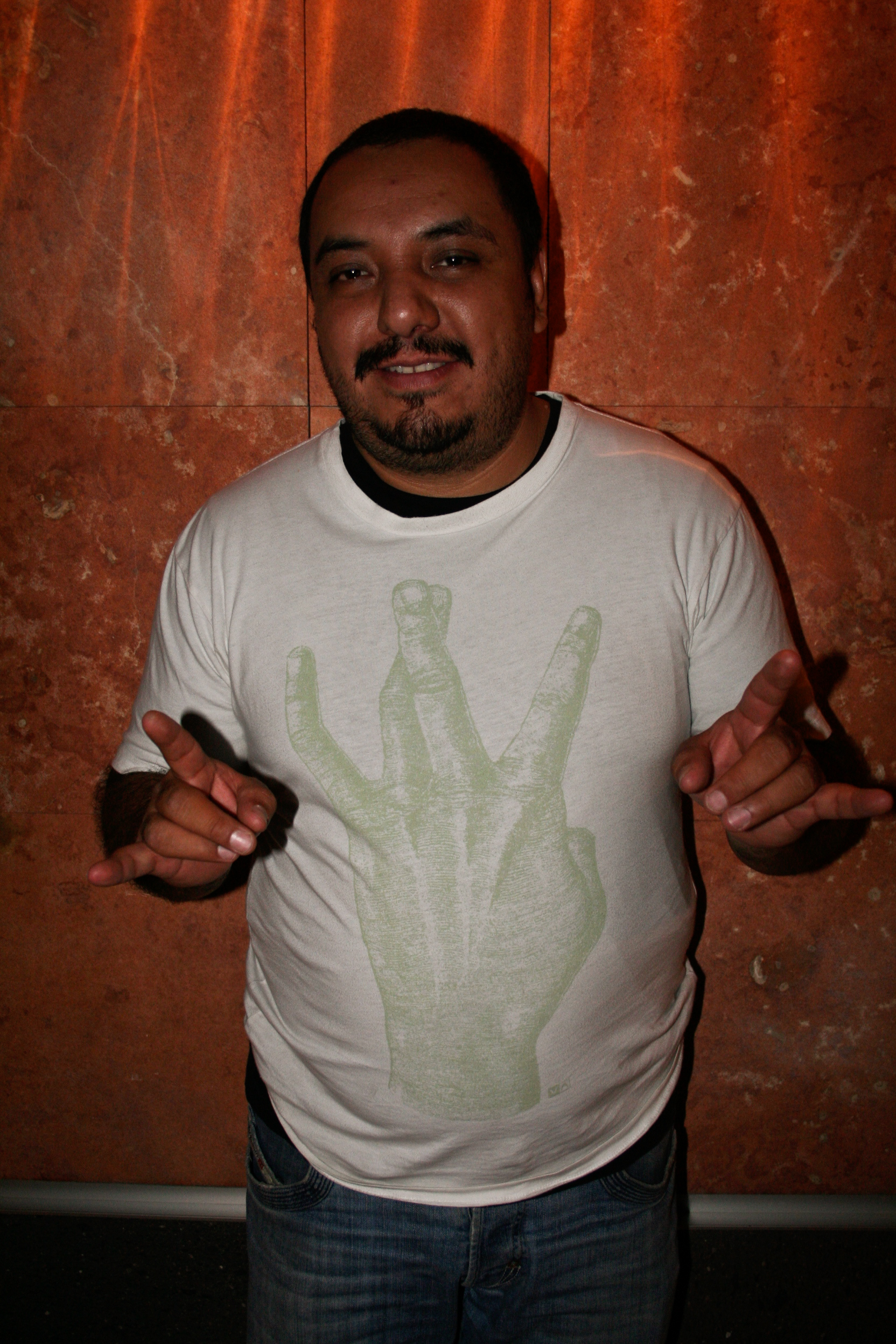
Paco Ayala, member of Mexican rock band Molotov, used to be a bandmate of Thalía in the group Din-Din.

=== Din-Din ===
Thalía started her musical career as part of the children's pop band Din-Din (originally called Pac-Man) in the 1980s. She recorded four LPs with the group.

Released songs recorded by Thalía as a member of Din-Din
Song	Other performer(s)	Writer(s)	Originating album	Year	Ref.
"Agujetas de Color de Rosa"			Recordando el Rock	1988	
"Al Compás del Reloj"			Recordando el Rock	1988	
"Aviéntense Todos"		Eddie Cochran; Jerry Capehart	Recordando el Rock and Roll	1983	
"Bule Bule"			Recordando el Rock	1988	
"Buenos Días Señor Vendedor"		Rocío Sosa	En Acción	1982	
"Canon del Reloj"		Valentín Rincón	En Acción	1982	
"Chica Alborotada"			Recordando el Rock	1988	
"Despeinada"			Recordando el Rock	1988	
"Diablo con Vestido Azul"		Frederick Long; William Stevenson	Recordando el Rock and Roll	1983	
"Dime"		José Luis Perales	Somos Alguien Muy Especial	1983	
"Din, Din, Din"		Bertha Martelli; Mario Amoroso	En Acción	1982	
"Din-Don"		Paola Saavedra	Somos Alguien Muy Especial	1983	
"Dios Siempre Está Aquí"		Alberto Lozano	Somos Alguien Muy Especial	1983	
"El Tango de los Pitufos"	Los Duendecitos	SEPP	Pitubailando	1983	
"En Forma"	Los Duendecitos	SEPP	Pitubailando	1983	
"Flauta Mágica"	Los Duendecitos	SEPP	Pitubailando	1983	
"La Amistad"		Paco Ayala	En Acción	1982	
"La Canción de los Pitufos"	Los Duendecitos	SEPP	Pitubailando	1983	
"La Pera Madura"			Recordando el Rock and Roll	1983	
"Larguirucha Sally"		Enotris Johnson; Robert Blackwell; Richard Penniman	Recordando el Rock and Roll	1983	
"Lloran los Pitufos"	Los Duendecitos	SEPP	Pitubailando	1983	
"Me Voy a Enamorar"		Eduardo Rodríguez	Somos Alguien Muy Especial	1983	
"Mi Novio el Coqueto"		Eduardo Rodríguez	Somos Alguien Muy Especial	1983	
"My Dear John (Investigador)"		Elton John	Somos Alguien Muy Especial	1983	
"Pac-Man"		Eduardo Rodriguez Asdraja	En Acción	1982	
"Pac-Man Rock"			Recordando el Rock	1988	
"Pinocho en el País de los Pitufos"	Los Duendecitos	SEPP	Pitubailando	1983	
"Pitufaré Pitufarás"	Los Duendecitos	SEPP	Pitubailando	1983	
"Pólvora"			Recordando el Rock and Roll	1983	
"Popotitos"			Recordando el Rock	1988	
"Recordando el Rock Nº1"		Buddy Kaye; David Hess; Domingo Samudio; Ethel Lees et al.	En Acción	1982	
"Recordando el Rock Nº2"		Armando Trejo; Dinno Donaggio; Eddi Cochran; Enotris Johnson et al.	Somos Alguien Muy Especial	1983	
"Rock de Amor Chiquito"		Eduardo Rodríguez	Somos Alguien Muy Especial	1983	
"Rock del Angelito"			Recordando el Rock	1988	
"Somos Alguien Muy Especial"		Jonathan Zarzosa	Somos Alguien Muy Especial	1983	
"Speedy González"			Recordando el Rock	1988	
"Tiroli Tirola"		Linda De Suza	Somos Alguien Muy Especial	1983	
"Todos Conmigo"		Víctor Alberti	Somos Alguien Muy Especial	1983	
"Ven a Bailar"		Rocío Sosa	En Acción	1982	
"Vivir Con..."		Alberto Lozano	En Acción	1982	
"Vuelve Vuelve Primavera"			Recordando el Rock and Roll	1983	

=== Timbiriche ===
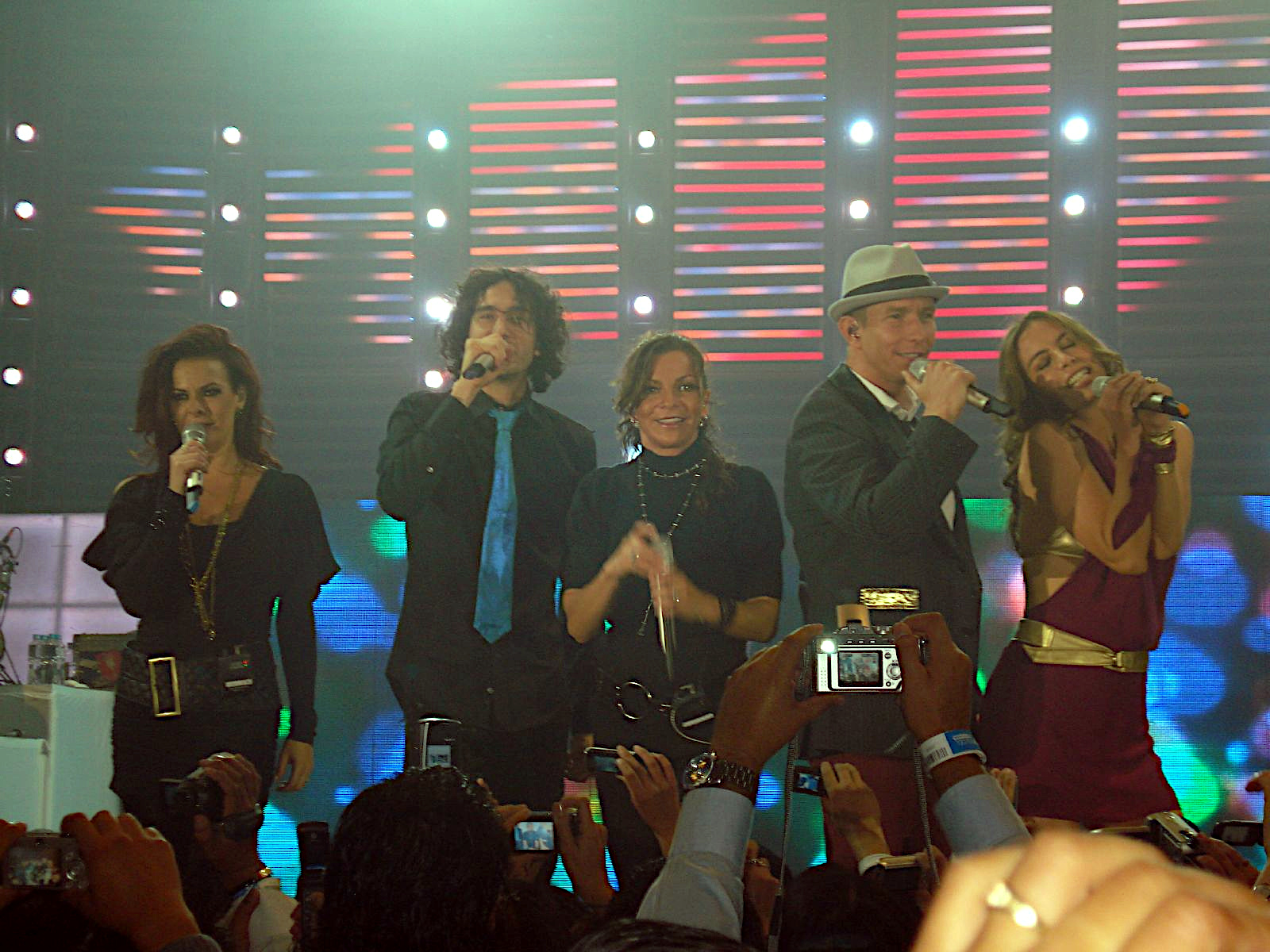
Thalía was a member of Timbiriche from 1986 to 1989.

In 1986 she joined Timbiriche as a replacement for Sasha Sökol who left the band. With them, Thalía recorded three studio albums until her departure in 1989, but she would later appear on the compilation album Los Clásicos de Timbiriche which consisted in some of the bands' greatest hits re-recorded with an orchestra.

Released songs recorded by Thalía as a member of Timbiriche
Song	Other performer(s)	Writer(s)	Originating album	Year	Ref.
"Acelerar"		Anahí Van; Guillermo Méndez Guiu	Timbiriche IX	1988	
"Ámame Hasta con los Dientes"		Anahí Van; Guillermo Méndez Guiu	Timbiriche VIII	1988	
"Amanda"		Amparo Rubín; Guillermo Méndez Guiu	Timbiriche IX	1988	
"Amazona"		Anahí Van; Guillermo Méndez Guiu	Timbiriche VIII	1988	
"Ay del Chiquirritín"			Esta Navidad	1987	
"Basta Ya"		Anahí Van; Guillermo Méndez Guiu	Timbiriche IX	1988	
"Besos de Ceniza"		Kiko Campos; Fernando Riba	Timbiriche VII	1987	
"Con Todos Menos Conmigo"		Roberto Guido Vitale	Timbiriche VII	1987	
"Esta Navidad"	La Hermandad		Esta Navidad	1987	
"Flash"		Kiko Campos; Fernando Riba	Quinceañera	1988	
"Irresistible"		Anahí Van; Guillermo Méndez Guiu	Timbiriche IX	1988	
"Junto a Ti"		Anahí Van; Guillermo Méndez Guiu	Timbiriche IX	1988	
"Lo Quiero"		Marco Flores	Timbiriche VIII	1988	
"Luna Llena"			Non-album single	1987	
"Mágico Amor"		Kiko Campos; Fernando Riba	Timbiriche VII	1987	
"Más Que un Amigo"		Carlos Lara Galván; Jesús Monárrez	Timbiriche VII	1987	
"Máscaras"		J.V. Sahrenkrog; Peteasen; Carlo Karges; Marco Flores; La Banda Jerez	Timbiriche VIII	1988	
"Me Estoy Volviendo Loca"		Anahí Van; Guillermo Méndez Guiu	Timbiriche IX	1988	
"Mírame (Cuestión de Tiempo)"		Kiko Campos; Fernando Riba	Timbiriche VII	1987	
"No"		Marco Flores	Timbiriche VII	1987	
"No Sé Si Es Amor"		Anahí Van; Guillermo Méndez Guiu	Timbiriche IX	1988	
"Paranoia"		Anahí Van; Guillermo Méndez Guiu	Timbiriche VIII	1988	
"Pasos"		Jesús Domínguez; Guillermo Méndez Guiu	Timbiriche IX	1988	
"Persecución en la Ciudad"		Amparo Rubín Tagle	Timbiriche VII	1987	
"Por Ti"		Omar Jasso; Samuel Zarzosa; Raúl G. Biestro	Los Clásicos de Timbiriche	1989	
"Quinceañera"		Álvaro Dávila; Guillermo Méndez Guiu	Quinceañera	1988	
"Rompecabezas"		Kiko Campos; Fernando Riba	Timbiriche VII	1987	
"Si No Es Ahora"		Kiko Campos; Fernando Riba	Timbiriche VII	1987	
"Solo"		Marco Flores; La Banda Jerez	Timbiriche IX	1988	
"Sólo para Ti"		Marco Flores; Áureo Baqueiro	Timbiriche IX	1988	
"Soy Como Soy"		Marco Flores	Timbiriche VIII	1988	
"Todo Cambia"		Áureo Baqueiro	Timbiriche VIII	1988	
"Todo o Nada"		Áureo Baqueiro	Timbiriche VIII	1988	
"Tú Me Vuelves Loco"		Carlos Lara Galvan; Jesús Monárrez	Timbiriche IX	1988	
"Tú y Yo Somos uno Mismo"		Marco Flores; Luca Carboni	Timbiriche VIII	1988	
"Vive la Vida"		Marco Flores; La Banda Jerez	Timbiriche VIII	1988	
"Ya Estaba Escrito"		D.A.R. Fernando Riba	Timbiriche VII	1987	

== Unreleased songs ==
In 1991 she participated on the Spanish late night show VIP Noche, for which she recorded and performed several songs, mostly Spanish adaptations of songs in English that belonged to the soundtrack of popular movies of the time.

Unreleased songs recorded by Thalía for VIP Noche
Song	Writer(s)	Originating movie soundtrack	Year	Ref.
"24.000 baci"	Ezio Leoni; Piero Vivarelli; Lucio Fulci; Adriano Celentano	Do You Remember Dolly Bell?	1991	
"Acalorada"	A. Jean; D. Vangarde		1991	
"Bajo del Mar"	Alan Menken; Howard Ashman	The Little Mermaid	1991	
"Bajo la Lluvia"	Arthur Freed; Nacio Herb Brown	Singin' in the Rain	1991	
"Cabaret"	John Kander; Fred Ebb	Cabaret	1991	
"Diamantes"	Leo Robin; Jule Styne	Gentlemen Prefer Blonde	1991	
"Goldfinger"	John Barry; Leslie Bricusse; Anthony Newley	Goldfinger	1991	
"La Bamba"	Traditional	La Bamba	1991	
"Las Flechas del Amor"	Albert Hammond; Mick Hazlewood		1991	
"Limón Limonero"	Henry Stephen		1991	
"New York, New York"	John Kander; Fred Ebb	New York City	1991	
"Pretty Woman"	Roy Orbison; Bill Dees	Pretty Woman	1991	
"Stayin' Alive"	Barry Gibb; Robin Gibb; Maurice Gibb	Saturday Night Fever	1991	
"Sugar, Sugar"	Jeff Barry; Andy Kim		1991	
"Tú Eres Mi Vida"	John DeNicola; Donald Markowitz; Franke Previte	Dirrty Dancing	1991	
"Un Sorbito de Champagne"	Los Brincos		1991	
"Venus"	Robbie van Leeuwen	Various	1991	
"Volaré, Cantaré"	Domenico Modugno; Franco Migliacci	Absolute Beginners	1991	
"What a Feeling (Sentimientos)"	Giorgio Moroder; Keith Forsey; Irene Cara	Flash Dance	1991	
"You Can Leave Your Hat On"	Randy Newman	9½ Weeks	1991	

== See also ==
- Thalía discography
- Timbiriche
