= Adriano Celentano discography =

The following is the discography of Italian singer and actor Adriano Celentano.

== Albums ==
=== Studio albums ===
- 1960: Adriano Celentano con Giulio Libano e la sua orchestra – Jolly LPJ 5008
- 1960: Furore – Jolly LPJ 5017
- 1962: Peppermint twist – Jolly LPJ 5021
- 1963: A New Orleans – Jolly LPJ 5025
- 1964: Non mi dir – Clan, ACC 40002
- 1966: Il ragazzo della via Gluck – Clan, ACC 40007
- 1968: Azzurro / Una carezza in un pugno – Clan, ACC 40011
- 1968: Adriano rock – Clan, BF 501
- 1970: Il forestiero – Clan, BFM 700
- 1971: Er Più – Storia d'amore e di coltello – Clan, BFM 602
- 1972: I mali del secolo – Clan, BFM 701
- 1973: Nostalrock – Clan, CLN 65764
- 1975: Yuppi du – Clan, CLN 69120
- 1976: Svalutation – Clan, CLN 86013
- 1977: Disco dance – Clan, CLN 86026
- 1977: Tecadisk – Clan, CLN 86033
- 1978: Ti avrò – Clan, CLN 20053
- 1978: Geppo il folle – Clan, CLN 20099
- 1979: Soli – Clan, CLN 20150
- 1980: Un po' artista un po' no – Clan, CLN 20201
- 1981: Deus – Clan, CLN 20257
- 1982: Uh... uh... – Clan, CLN 20324
- 1983: Atmosfera – Clan, CLN 20380
- 1984: I miei americani... – Clan, CLN 20445
- 1985: Joan Lui – Clan, CLN 20485
- 1986: I miei americani... 2 – Clan, CLN 20545
- 1987: La pubblica ottusità – Clan, CLN 20699
- 1991: Il re degli ignoranti – Clan, 9031 74439-1
- 1994: Quel punto – Clan, 4509 97319-1
- 1996: Arrivano gli uomini – Clan, CLCD 74321 381192
- 1998: Mina Celentano – Clan/PDU, 90011 (with Mina)
- 1999: Io non so parlar d'amore – Clan, CLN 13641
- 2000: Esco di rado e parlo ancora meno – Clan, CLN 20482
- 2002: Per sempre – Clan, CLN 20511
- 2004: C'è sempre un motivo – Clan, CLN 20551
- 2005: C'è sempre un motivo + L'Indiano – Clan, CLN 20551
- 2007: Dormi amore, la situazione non è buona – Clan, CLN 2058
- 2011: Facciamo finta che sia vero – Clan, CLN 2098
- 2016: Le migliori – Clan, CLN ? (with Mina)
- 2019: Adrian – Clan, CLN ?

=== Live albums ===
- 1979: Me, live! – Clan, CLN 22203 (reissued on CD as Il concerto di Adriano)
- 2012: Adriano Live – Clan / Universal Music

=== Compilation albums ===
- 1966: La festa – Clan, ACC 40006
- 1969: Le robe che ha detto Adriano – Clan, BF 502
- 1969: Pioggia di successi – Clan, BF LP 506
- 1970: Adriano hits – Clan, BF LP 600 nostal rock
- 1973: La storia di uno...Adriano Celentano – Clan, CLN 68215
- 1975: Il meglio di Adriano Celentano – Clan, CLN 69133
- 1978: Celentanando – Clan, 1978 CGD / CLAN
- 1979: Antologia ('57–'80) – Clan, CLN 22504
- 1980: Il tempo se ne va compilation musica
- 1982: Il cinema di Adriano – Clan, CLN 25037
- 1982: Storia d'amore – Ariola (with Claudia Mori)
- 1983: Le volte che Adriano è stato primo – CLN 20391
- 1988: Antologia '57–'87 (6 discs) – Clan, CLN 77002
- 1992: Superbest – Clan, 4509 91216-1
- 1995: Alla corte del ReMix – Clan, CLCD 74321 331042
- 1997: Le origini di Adriano Celentano vol. 1 – RTI Music, 11611
- 1997: Und immer Azzurro – Seine 20 größten Erfolge 1962–1997 – Clan, CD 74314905623
- 1999: Le origini di Adriano Celentano vol. 2 – Clan, 496155
- 2000: Questa è la storia di uno di noi (cofanetto)
- 2001: Il cuore, la voce – Clan, CLN 20501
- 2003: Le volte che Celentano è stato 1 – Clan, CLN 20521
- 2003: TRE
- 2005: Una stella in mezzo al ciel
- 2006: Le più belle canzoni di Adriano Celentano
- 2006: Unicamente Celentano – Clan, CLN 20571
- 2008: L'animale – Clan
- 2010: Il ribelle rock! – Sony Music
- 2010: Il meglio di Adriano Celentano – NAR International
- 2010: Antologia Italian Style – Venus Distribuzione
- 2021: MinaCelentano – The Complete Recordings

== Singles ==
45 rpms

- 1958: "Rip It Up/Jailhouse Rock" – Music 2223
- 1958: "Blueberry Hill/Tutti frutti" – Music 2224
- 1958: "Man Smart/I Love You Baby" – Music 2232
- 1958: "Tell Me That You Love Me/The Stroll" – Music 2233
- 1958: "Happy Days Are Here Again/Buona sera signorina" – Jolly J 20032
- 1958: "Hoola Hop Rock/La febbre dell'hoola hop" – Jolly J 20045
- 1959: "Ciao ti dirò/Un'ora con te" – Jolly J 20057
- 1959: "Il ribelle/Nessuno crederà" – Jolly J 20063
- 1959: "Il tuo bacio è come un rock/I ragazzi del juke-box" – Jolly J 20064
- 1959: "Teddy Girl/Desidero te" – Jolly J 20068
- 1959: "Pronto pronto/Idaho" – Jolly J 20069
- 1960: "Nikita Rock/Blue Jeans Rock" – Jolly J 20079
- 1960: "Rock matto/Impazzivo per te" – Jolly J 20080
- 1960: "Impazzivo per te/Crazy Rock" – Jolly J 20080
- 1960: "Personality/Il mondo gira" – Jolly J 20089
- 1960: "Così no/La gatta che scotta" – Jolly J 20090
- 1960: "Piccola/Ritorna lo shimmy" – Jolly J 20092
- 1960: "Pitagora/A cosa serve soffrire" – Jolly J 20106
- 1960: "Giarrettiera rossa/Che dritta!" – Jolly J 20107
- 1960: "Furore/Movimento di rock" – Jolly J 20124
- 1961: "24 mila baci/Aulì-ulè" – Jolly J 20127
- 1961: "Non esiste l'amor/Basta" – Jolly J 20137
- 1961: "Gilly/Coccolona" – Jolly J 20144
- 1961: "Nata per me/Non essere timida" – Jolly J 20150
- 1962: "Forse forse/Peppermint Twist" – Jolly J 20153
- 1962: "Ciao amore/Veleno" – Caramba Jolly C 11000
- 1962: "Si è spento il sole/La mezza luna" – Jolly J 20178
- 1962: "Stai lontana da me/Sei rimasta sola/Amami e baciami" – Clan, ACC 24001
- 1962: "24 mila baci/Il tuo bacio è come un rock" – Jolly J 20185
- 1962: "Pregherò (prima parte)/Pasticcio in Paradiso" – Clan, ACC 24005
- 1963: "A New Orleans/Un sole caldo caldo caldo" – Jolly J 20197
- 1963: "Il tangaccio/Grazie, prego, scusi" – Clan, ACC 24009
- 1963: "Serafino campanaro/Ehi stella" – Jolly J 20220
- 1963: "Sabato triste/Le notti lunghe" – Clan, ACC 24012
- 1964: "Una notte vicino al mare/Hello Mary Lou" – Jolly J 20228
- 1964: "Non mi dir/Non piangerò" – Clan, ACC 24015
- 1964: "Il problema più importante/È inutile davvero" – Clan, ACC 24016
- 1964: "L'angelo custode/Bambini miei" – Clan, ACC 24019
- 1964: "Ciao ragazzi/Chi ce l'ha con me" – Clan, ACC 24022
- 1964: "Sono un simpatico/E voi ballate/Due tipi come noi" – Clan, ACC 24024
- 1965: "La festa/Ringo" – Clan, ACC 24027
- 1966: "Il ragazzo della via Gluck"/"Chi era lui" – Clan, ACC 24032
- 1966: "Mondo in mi 7a/Una festa sui prati" – Clan, ACC 24040
- 1967: "La coppia più bella del mondo/Torno sui miei passi" – Clan, ACC 24051
- 1967: "Tre passi avanti/Eravamo in 100.000" – Clan, ACC 24058
- 1967: "30 donne nel west/Più forte che puoi" – Clan, ACC 24063
- 1968: "Canzone/Un bimbo sul leone" – Clan, ACC 24073
- 1968: "Azzurro/Una carezza in un pugno" – Clan, ACC 24080
- 1968: "L'attore/La tana del re" – Clan, BF 69001
- 1969: "La storia di Serafino/La pelle" – Clan, BF 69013
- 1969: "Storia d'amore/Straordinariamente" – Clan, BF 69014
- 1969: "Lirica d'inverno/L'uomo nasce nudo" – Clan, BF 69030
- 1970: "Chi non lavora non fa l'amore/Due nemici innamorati" – Clan, BF 69040
- 1970: "Chi non lavora non fa l'amore /EA" – Clan, BF 69041
- 1970: "Viola/Se sapevo non-crescevo" – Clan, BF 69051
- 1971: "Sotto le lenzuola/Il forestiero" – Clan, BF 70000
- 1971: "Una storia come questa/Brutta" – Clan, BF 70010
- 1971: "Er più/Una storia d'amore e di coltello" – Clan, BF 70015
- 1972: "Un albero di trenta piani/Forse eri meglio di lei" – Clan, BF 70018
- 1972: "La ballata di Pinocchio/I Will Drink the Wine" – Clan, BF 70022
- 1972: "Prisencolinensinainciusol"/"Disc Jockey" – Clan, BF 70026
- 1973: "L'unica chance/Quel signore del piano di sopra" – Clan, CLN 1319
- 1973: "Only You/We're Gonna Move" – Clan, CLN 1887
- 1974: "Bellissima/Stringimi a te" – Clan, CLN 2443
- 1975: "Yuppi du/La ballata" – Clan, CLN 3208
- 1975: "Un'altra volta chiudi la porta/Do dap" – Clan, CLN 3633
- 1976: "Svalutation/La barca" – Clan, CLN 4375
- 1977: "A Woman in Love/Rock Around the Clock/Don't Play That Song (You Lied)" – Clan, CLN 5048
- 1977: "When Love/Somebody Save Me" – Clan, CLN 5403
- 1978: "Ti avrò/La moglie, l'amante, l'amica" – Clan, CLN 10089
- 1979: "Che cosa ti farei/Geppo" – Clan, CLN 10120
- 1979: "Soli/Io e te" – Clan, CLN 10174
- 1980: "Qua la mano/Gocce d'acqua" – Clan, CLN 10251
- 1980: "Il tempo se ne va/Non se ne parla nemmeno" – Clan, CLN 10252
- 1980: Tu non mi lascerai– Clan
- 1980: "Innamorata, incavolata a vita/Se non è amore" – Clan, CLN 10305
- 1981: "L'artigiano (1ª parte)/L'artigiano (2ª parte)" – Clan, CLN 10326
- 1982: "Crazy Movie/Roma che fa...te innamora" – Clan, CLN 10371
- 1982: "Uel mae sae/We're Gonna Move" – Clan, CLN 10393
- 1982: "Uh...uh.../Jungla di città" – Clan, CLN 10442
- 1984: "Susanna/Il cantante folle" – Clan, CLN 23001
- 1987: "Mi attrai/La luce del sole" – Clan, CLN 10786

More singles

- 1995: "Voglio prendere il sole"
- 1995: "Prisencolinensinainciusol (Remixes – maxi single)
- 1996: "Cosi come sei"
- 1996: "Arrivano gli uomini"
- 1996: "Solo da un quarto d'ora"
- 1998: "Acqua e sale"
- 1998: "Brivido felino"
- 1998: "Che taggia dì"
- 1999: "Gelosia"
- 1999: "L'emozione non-ha voce"
- 1999: "L'uomo di cartone"
- 1999: "Una rosa pericolosa"
- 1999: "Qual è la direzione"
- 1999: "Mi domando"
- 1999: "L'arcobaleno"
- 2000: "Senz'amore"
- 2000: "Le pesche d'inverno"
- 2000: "Per averti"
- 2001: "Apri il cuore"
- 2001: "Ti prenderò"
- 2001: "Quello che non-ti ho detto mai"
- 2001: "Tir"
- 2001: "Le stesse cose"
- 2002: "Confessa"
- 2003: "Per sempre"
- 2003: "Più di un sogno"
- 2003: "Mi fa male"
- 2004: "C'è sempre un motivo"
- 2004: "Marì Marì"
- 2005: "Ancora vivo"
- 2005: "Valeva la pena"
- 2005: "L'indiano"
- 2006: "Oh Diana"
- 2007: "Hai bucato la mia vita"
- 2007: "La situazione non è buona"
- 2008: "Dormi amore"
- 2008: "Fiori"
- 2008: "Aria...non-sei più tu"
- 2008: "Sognando Chernobyl"
- 2008: "La cura"
- 2011: "Non ti accorgevi di me"
- 2011: "Non so più cosa fare"
- 2011: "Ti penso e cambia il mondo"
- 2012: "Anna parte"
- 2012: "La cumbia di chi cambia"
- 2013: "Ti fai del male"
- 2013: "Io non-ricordo (da quel giorno tu)"
- 2013: "Mai nella vita"
- 2023: "Toscana Fanboys" (Peter Fox feat. Adriano Celentano)
