= Adriano Live =

Live album by Adriano Celentano
- Released: 2012
- Label: Clan

Adriano Celentano chronology
Facciamo finta che sia vero (2011)	Adriano Live (2012)	Le migliori (2016)

Adriano Live (also graphically rendered as AdrianoLive) is a live album by Italian singer Adriano Celentano, released in 2012 on his label Clan.

== Overview ==
The album was recorded during two concerts Celentano held on 8 and 9 October 2012 at the Arena di Verona. The two concerts were also broadcast live on Canale 5 under the title Rock Economy, recording very high ratings (8.918 million and 9.112 million viewers respectively). The album was released on 4 December 2012, in CD and DVD version. The CD version consists of two CDs, the first one with 17 songs taken from the concert and the second one with a compilation of mostly recent hits. The DVD has a 112 minutes duration and includes more songs (including guest Gianni Morandi performing Lucio Dalla's "Caruso") and monologues.

== Track listing ==
CD 1
No.	Title	Writer(s)	Length
1.	"Svalutation"	Adriano Celentano, Gino Santercole, Luciano Beretta, Vito Pallavicini	4:36
2.	"Si è spento il sole"	Beretta, Miki Del Prete, Ezio Leoni, Celentano	3:09
3.	"La Cumbia di chi cambia"	Jovanotti	4:34
4.	"L'emozione non ha voce"	Mogol, Gianni Bella	4:23
5.	"Pregherò"	Ben E. King, Jerry Leiber, Mike Stoller, Don Backy	3:40
6.	"Mondo in mi 7a"	Beretta, Mogol, Del Prete, Detto Mariano	6:34
7.	"Soli"	Toto Cutugno, Cristiano Minellono	4:12
8.	"L'arcobaleno"	Mogol, Bella	3:21
9.	"Storia d'amore"	Beretta, Celentano, Del Prete	5:30
10.	"Medley: Ringo"	Don Robertson, Hal Blair, Castellano, Pipolo	5:07
11.	"Il ragazzo della via Gluck"	Beretta, Celentano, Del Prete	4:49
12.	"Città senza testa (Cammino)"	Celentano	6:04
13.	"Una carezza in un pugno"	Beretta, Del Prete, Nando De Luca, Santercole	3:28
14.	"Ti penso e cambia il mondo" (with Gianni Morandi)	Pacifico, Matteo Saggese, Steve Lipson	4:24
15.	"Azzurro"	Pallavicini, Paolo Conte, Michele Virano	2:49
16.	"Ready Teddy"	John Marascalco, Robert Blackwell	2:26
17.	"Prisencolinensinainciusol"	Celentano	3:32

CD 2
No.	Title	Writer(s)	Length
1.	"Solo da un quarto d'ora"	Celentano	5:44
2.	"Io sono un uomo libero"	Ivano Fossati	5:47
3.	"Quel Casinha (Il ragazzo della via Gluck)" (with Cesária Évora)	Beretta, Celentano, Del Prete	4:28
4.	"24.000 baci"	Piero Vivarelli, Lucio Fulci, Leoni, Celentano	2:15
5.	"Nata per me (Remix)"	Mogol, Del Prete	2:58
6.	"Dormi amore"	Mogol, Bella	5:31
7.	"Tir"	Mogol, Bella	4:29
8.	"Per sempre"	Mogol, Bella, Stefano Pieroni	5:13
9.	"Gelosia"	Mogol, Bella	4:30

== Charts ==
Chart (2012–2013)	Peak position
Italy (FIMI)	11
