= L'animale (album) =

Compilation album by Adriano Celentano
- Released: 2008
- Label: Clan

Adriano Celentano chronology
Dormi amore, la situazione non è buona (2007)	L'animale (2008)	Facciamo finta che sia vero (2011)

L'animale ('The Animal') is a compilation album by Italian singer Adriano Celentano, released in 2008 on his label Clan.

== Overview ==
The title of the album was suggested by Jovanotti, who used to call Celentano 'L'animale' as a nod to his instinctual nature.

The album consists of two CDs, the first one focusing on love longs, the second centered around protest songs and songs marked by social criticism. Each CD opens with a new recording, respectively a cover of 1996 Franco Battiato's song "La cura" and "Sognando Chernobyl", a Celentano-penned outburst against the violence against children, the dangers of nuclear power, the overbuilding and the death penalty. The idea to record "La cura" came from Claudia Mori, and on that occasion, Battiato created a new arrangement of the song. "Sognando Chernobyl" was launched with a music video directed by the same Celentano, which was exclusively broadcast on Sky Italia.

== Track listing ==
CD 1 - Canzoni d'amore
No.	Title	Writer(s)	Length
1.	"La cura"	Franco Battiato, Manlio Sgalambro	4:01
2.	"L'emozione non ha voce (Io non so parlar d'amore)"	Mogol, Gianni Bella	4:08
3.	"L'arcobaleno"	Mogol, Bella	3:30
4.	"Storia d'amore"	Adriano Celentano, Luciano Beretta	4:53
5.	"Più di un sogno"	Celentano	5:21
6.	"Acqua e sale" (with Mina)	Giovanni Donzelli, Vincenzo Leomporro	4:39
7.	"Dormi amore"	Mogol, Bella	5:30
8.	"Una carezza in un pugno"	Beretta, Miki Del Prete, Gino Santercole, Nando De Luca	2:56
9.	"Apri il cuore"	Mogol, Bella	5:20
10.	"Gelosia"	Mogol, Bella	4:27
11.	"Hai bucato la mia vita"	Celentano, Ludovico Einaudi	4:56
12.	"Una rosa pericolosa"	Mogol, Celentano	4:34
13.	"Angel"	Matteo Di Franco	5:07
14.	"L'ultima donna che amo"	Mogol, Bella	3:50

CD 2 - Canzoni contro
No.	Title	Writer(s)	Length
1.	"Sognando Chernobyl"	Celentano	11:03
2.	"La situazione non è buona"	Tricarico	5:15
3.	"Mondo in mi 7a"	Beretta, Del Prete, Mogol	6:08
4.	"I passi che facciamo"	Pacifico, Philippe Leon	5:36
5.	"Il ragazzo della via Gluck"	Beretta, Prete, Celentano	4:14
6.	"Svalutation"	Celentano, Santercole, Beretta, Vito Pallavicini	3:08
7.	"Io sono un uomo libero"	Ivano Fossati	5:49
8.	"Prisencolinensinainciusol (remix)"	Celentano	5:18
9.	"Aria… non sei più tu"	Jovanotti, Daniel Vuletic	4:29
10.	"Un albero di trenta piani"	Celentano	3:57
11.	"C’è sempre un motivo"	Carlo Mazzoni	5:25
12.	"I Want to Know, Part I & II"	Celentano, Santercole, Beretta	8:11
13.	"L'ultimo degli uccelli"	Celentano	4:50
14.	"Uomo macchina"	Santercole	3:46

== Charts ==
Chart (2008–2009)	Peak position
Italy (FIMI)	7
