= Tutte le migliori =

Compilation album (box set) by Mina and Adriano Celentano
- Released: 1 December 2017
- Recorded: 1997–2017
- Genre: Pop; rock
- Label: PDU; Clan Celentano
- Producer: Massimiliano Pani; Claudia Mori

Mina chronology
Le migliori (2016)	Tutte le migliori (2017)	Maeba (2018)

Adriano Celentano chronology
Le migliori (2016)	Tutte le migliori (2017)	Adrian (2019)

Singles from Tutte le migliori
- 1. "Eva" Released: 10 November 2017

Tutte le migliori is a compilation album by Italian singers Mina and Adriano Celentano, released on 1 December 2017 by PDU and Clan Celentano and distributed by Sony Music.

== Background ==
In November 2016, during a press conference on the occasion of the presentation of the album Le migliori, the producers of the project, Claudia Mori and Massimiliano Pani, announced the reissue of the album for Christmas 2017 as a box set with the first joint album of artists, Mina Celentano, and two new songs.

In November 2017, when it became known about the release of this album, it turned out that it would be a collection of the best duets of Mina and Celentano, as well as their best solo recordings, there would also be only one new song, "Eva".

== Release ==
The compilation itself was released on 1 December 2017. It became number three on the Italian chart, as well as fifty-third on the Swiss chart.

The album was released in several versions:

- Standard edition: Includes two CDs. The first one contains eleven tracks, among which ten are a collection of the best duets by Mina and Celentano and one new song; the second disc includes eighteen solo best songs by both artists. This version is also available in digital format.
- Gift edition: Includes four CDs. The first two are the standard edition, the other two are the studio albums Mina Celentano (1998) and Le migliori (2016). The version also includes a digibook.
- Vinyl edition: Includes three vinyl records with the best duets and solo tracks (actually Tutte le migliori itself).
- Picture disc edition: Includes five vinyl records (picture disc) with albums Tutte le migliori, Mina Celentano and Le migliori.
- Limited edition: Includes five vinyl records with all the songs from the gift edition and six posters.

== Promotion ==
Before the album was released on 10 November 2017, the single "Eva" was released. Its authors were Luigi De Renzo and Andrea Gallo. A lyric video shot by Gaetano Morbioli was also posted on the duo's YouTube channel.

In addition, on the occasion of the release of the collection, on 2 December 2017, on Rai 1, a special edition of Fratelli d'Italia was broadcast, dedicated to the creative duo of Mina and Adriano Celentano; the director was Vincenzo Mollica. The program was watched by about four and a half million viewers.

== Track listing ==
CD 1
No.	Title	Writer(s)	Length
1.	"Eva"	Andrea Girolamo Gallo; Luigi De Rienzo	5:12
2.	"Specchi riflessi"	Giovanni Donzelli; Vincenzo Leomporro	4:57
3.	"Amami amami"	Riccardo Sinigallia; Idan Raichel	3:18
4.	"Acqua e sale"	Giovanni Donzelli; Vincenzo Leomporro	4:40
5.	"A un passo da te"	Fabio Ilacqua	4:31
6.	"Brivido felino"	Paolo Audino; Stefano Cenci	3:43
7.	"Come un diamante nascosto nella neve"	Marco Bruni	3:46
8.	"Sempre sempre sempre"	Luigi Albertelli; Enrico Riccardi	4:46
9.	"È l'amore"	Andrea Mingardi; Maurizio Tirelli	3:39
10.	"Sono le tre"	Luca Rustici; Philippe Leon	3:47
11.	"Che t'aggia di'"	Adriano Celentano	5:08
Total length:			47:28

CD 2
No.	Title	Writer(s)	Performer	Length
1.	"Volami nel cuore"	Alberto Testa; Manrico Mologni; Gualtiero Malgoni	Mina	3:37
2.	"L'emozione non ha voce"	Mogol; Gianni Bella	Celentano	4:09
3.	"Se telefonando"	Maurizio Costanzo; Ghigo De Chiara; Ennio Morricone	Mina	2:59
4.	"Ti penso e cambia il mondo"	Pacifico; Matteo Saggese; Stephen Lipson	Celentano	4:27
5.	"Ancora ancora ancora"	Cristiano Malgioglio; Gianpietro Felisatti	Mina	4:19
6.	"Storia d'amore"	Luciano Beretta; Adriano Celentano; Miki Del Prete	Celentano	4:54
7.	"Grande grande grande"	Tony Renis; Alberto Testa	Mina	4:00
8.	"Apri il cuore"	Mogol; Cheope; Gianni Bella; Rosario Bella	Celentano	5:20
9.	"Questa vita loca"	Francisco Cespedes; Cristiano Malgioglio	Mina	3:52
10.	"Azzurro"	Vito Pallavicini; Paolo Conte; Michele Virano	Celentano	3:43
11.	"Portati via"	Stefano Borgia	Mina	3:57
12.	"Il ragazzo della via Gluck"	Luciano Beretta; Miki Del Prete; Adriano Celentano	Celentano	4:14
13.	"L'importante è finire"	Cristiano Malgioglio; Alberto Anelli	Mina	3:22
14.	"Prisencolinensinainciusol" (New version)	Adriano Celentano	Celentano	4:09
15.	"Fosse vero"	Alberto De Martini; Massimiliano Pani	Mina	4:20
16.	"La gonna e l'insalata"	Adriano Celentano	Celentano	5:06
17.	"Insieme"	Mogol; Lucio Battisti	Mina	4:10
18.	"Io sono un uomo libero"	Ivano Fossati	Celentano	5:50
Total length:				76:00

CD 3 — Mina Celentano
No.	Title	Length
Total length:		45:16

CD 4 — Le migliori
No.	Title	Length
Total length:		46:45

== Charts ==
Chart performance for Tutte le migliori
Chart (2017)	Peak position
Italian Albums (FIMI)	3
Italian Vinyl Albums (FIMI)	2
Swiss Albums (Schweizer Hitparade)	53
