= Adrian (album) =

Studio album by Adriano Celentano
- Released: 25 January 2019
- Label: Clan / Universal Music Italia

Adriano Celentano chronology
Tutte le migliori (2017)	Adrian (2019)	MinaCelentano – The Complete Recordings (2021)

Professional ratings
Review scores
Source	Rating
Rockol	no rating

Adrian is a studio album by Italian singer Adriano Celentano, released on 25 January 2019 on his label Clan and distributed through Universal Music Italia.

== Track listing ==
CD 1
No.	Title	Lyrics	Music	Length
1.	"I want to know" (Benny Benassi Remix)	Adriano Celentano, Luciano Beretta	Gino Santercole	3:47
2.	"Prisencolinensinainciusol" (Benny Benassi Remix)	Adriano Celentano	Adriano Celentano	4:09
3.	"Ti penso e cambia il mondo"	Pacifico	Matteo Saggese, Steve Lipson	4:22
4.	"Storia d'amore"	Adriano Celentano, Luciano Beretta, Michele Del Prete	Adriano Celentano, Nando De Luca	4:55
5.	"Svalutation"	Adriano Celentano, Luciano Beretta, Vito Pallavicini	Gino Santercole	3:11
6.	"I passi che facciamo"	Pacifico, Philippe Leon	Adriano Celentano, Fio Zanotti, Gianni Bella	5:33
7.	"Per sempre"	Gianni Bella, Stefano Pieroni	Adriano Celentano, Fio Zanotti, Gianni Bella	5:12
8.	"Uomo macchina"	Gino Santercole	Gino Santercole	3:46
9.	"Mondo in mi 7a"	Adriano Celentano, Michele Del Prete, Mogol	Adriano Celentano, Michele Del Prete	6:12
10.	"Un albero di trenta piani"	Adriano Celentano	Adriano Celentano	4:01
11.	"Le stesse cose"	Carlo Mazzoni	Fio Zanotti	5:42
12.	"Ti lascio vivere"	Fabrizio Berlincioni	Mauro Spina	4:33
13.	"La mezza luna"	Alberto Larici, Fred Ignor	Heino Gaze	3:30
14.	"Facciamo finta che sia vero"	Franco Battiato, Manlio Sgalambro	Nicola Piovani	3:24
15.	"Prisencolinensinainciusol"	Adriano Celentano	Adriano Celentano	3:51
16.	"I want to know (Pt. 1)"	Adriano Celentano, Luciano Beretta	Gino Santercole	2:48
17.	"I want to know (Pt. 2)"	Adriano Celentano, Luciano Beretta	Gino Santercole	5:22

CD 2 — Adrian (animated TV series) soundtrack
No.	Title	Music	Length
1.	"Adrian"	Nicola Piovani	3:25
2.	"Darian"	Nicola Piovani	2:55
3.	"Gilda"	Nicola Piovani	3:21
4.	"La volpe"	Nicola Piovani	3:25
5.	"In commedia"	Nicola Piovani	4:55
6.	"Il dissanguatore"	Nicola Piovani	4:57

== Charts ==
Chart (2019)	Peak position
Italian Albums (FIMI)	9
Swiss Albums (Schweizer Hitparade)	81
