= Le robe che ha detto Adriano =

Compilation album by Adriano Celentano
- Released: 1969
- Label: Clan Celentano

Adriano Celentano chronology
Adriano rock (1968)	Le robe che ha detto Adriano (1969)	Il forestiero (1970)

Le robe che ha detto Adriano (lit. 'The things that Adriano said') is a compilation album by Italian singer Adriano Celentano, released in 1969 on his label Clan Celentano. (The album includes several new songs but is listed as a compilation on Celentano's official website.)

All the songs on this album address the current issues of that time. According to the book Adriano Celentano. Incorrigible Romantic and Rebel, the album can be seen as the basis for the singer's subsequent work. Six main themes that would be recurrent in his future songs are discernible:

1. Love: "Storia d‘amore", "Lirica d‘inverno", "Straordinariamente";
2. God: "Chi era lui", "L'uomo nasce nudo", "La pelle";
3. Respect for nature: "La storia di Serafno", "Il ragazzo della via Gluck", "Una festa sui prati", "Se sapevo non crescevo", "Un bimbo sul leone";
4. Politics: "Napoleone, il cowboy e lo zar", "Mondo in mi 7a".

== Track listing ==
No.	Title	Writer(s)	Length
1.	"Lirica d'inverno"	Adriano Celentano, Nando De Luca	3:55
2.	"Un bimbo sul leone"	Gino Santercole, De Luca	3:36
3.	"Chi era lui"	Miki Del Prete, Mogol, Paolo Conte	2:49
4.	"La storia di Serafino"	Celentano, Carlo Rustichelli	3:54
5.	"Straordinariamente"	Luciano Beretta, Santercole, De Luca	3:51
6.	"Il ragazzo della via Gluck"	Celentano, Detto Mariano	4:15
7.	"Storia d'amore"	Celentano, De Luca	4:55
8.	"Napoleone, il cowboy e lo zar"	Beretta, Del Prete, Dickie Thompson	2:48
9.	"Una festa sui prati"	Beretta, Del Prete, Mogol, Celentano, Mariano	3:17
10.	"Mondo in mi 7ª"	Beretta, Del Prete, Mogol, Celentano, Mariano	6:10
11.	"L'uomo nasce nudo"	Roberto Negri, Giuseppe Verdecchia	4:57
12.	"La pelle"	Santercole, De Luca	3:10

== Charts ==
Chart (1970)	Peak position
Italy (Musica e dischi)	14
