= Non mi dir =

Studio album by Adriano Celentano
- Released: 1964
- Label: Clan Celentano

Adriano Celentano chronology
A New Orleans (1963)	Non mi dir (1964)	La festa (1966)

Non mi dir (lit. 'Don't tell me') is a studio album by Italian singer Adriano Celentano, released on his label Clan Celentano in 1964.

== Track listing ==
No.	Title	Writer(s)	Length
1.	"Stai lontana da me (Tower of Strength)"	Mogol, Burt Bacharach	2:13
2.	"Sei rimasta sola"	Miki Del Prete, Ricky Gianco	2:22
3.	"Uno strano tipo"	Miki Del Prete, Mogol, Don Backy, Adriano Celentano, Detto Mariano	2:05
4.	"Pregherò (Stand by Me)"	Don Backy, Ben E. King, Elmo Glick	2:59
5.	"Grazie, prego, scusi"	Miki Del Prete, Mogol, Pino Massara	2:05
6.	"Capirai"	Mogol, Pino Massara	1:55
7.	"Ciao ragazzi"	Miki Del Prete, Mogol, Adriano Celentano, Detto Mariano	2:33
8.	"Non mi dir (Symphonie)"	Miki Del Prete, Claudio Adorni, André Tabet, Alex Alstone	2:12
9.	"È inutile davvero"	Miki Del Prete, Mogol, Gino Santercole, Detto Mariano	2:35
10.	"Le notti lunghe"	Adriano Celentano, Paolo Zavallone, Pino Massara	2:00
11.	"Il problema più importante (If You Gotta Make a Fool of Somebody)"	Luciano Beretta, Miki Del Prete, Rudy Clark	2:31
12.	"Sabato triste"	Miki Del Prete, Don Backy, Adriano Celentano, Detto Mariano	3:23
13.	"Non piangerò"	Miki Del Prete, Mogol, Pino Massara, Detto Mariano	2:25
14.	"Chi ce l'ha con me"	Miki Del Prete, Mogol, Pino Massara	3:20

Non mi dir – 1995 re-issue bonus track
No.	Title	Writer(s)	Length
15.	"Amami e baciami"	Miki Del Prete, Valerio Vancheri, Adriano Celentano	1:58

== Charts ==
Chart (1964–1965)	Peak position
Italy (Musica e dischi)	3
