= Adriano rock =

Studio album by Adriano Celentano
- Released: 1968
- Label: Clan Celentano

Adriano Celentano chronology
Azzurro / Una carezza in un pugno (1968)	Adriano rock (1968)	Le robe che ha detto Adriano (1969)

Adriano rock is a studio album by Italian singer Adriano Celentano, released shortly before Christmas of 1968 on his label Clan Celentano.

== Overview ==
Unlike the previous albums that mostly consisted of songs that had been previously released on singles, this one was the first Celentano's album containing all new material. The songs "Il grande sarto" and "Napoleone, il cowboy e lo zar" were later remade under different titles and with slightly different lyrics for the albums Le robe che ha detto Adriano and Il re degli ignoranti.

Adriano Rock was one of Celentano's least-selling albums.

== Track listing ==
Side 1
No.	Title	Lyrics	Music	Artist	Length
1.	"L'attore"	Luciano Beretta, Miki Del Prete	Adriano Celentano, Pilade, Nando de Luca		2:56
2.	"Non ci fate caso"	Luciano Beretta, Miki Del Prete	Charles Calhoun		2:31
3.	"Come farai"	Vito Pallavicini	Gino Santercole, Nando de Luca	Claudia Mori	2:45
4.	"La tana del re"	Luciano Beretta, Miki Del Prete	Gino Santercole, Nando de Luca		2:07
5.	"Tutto da mia madre"	Luciano Beretta, Miki Del Prete	Gino Santercole, Winfield Scott		2:38

Side 1
No.	Title	Lyrics	Music	Length
1.	"Napoleone, il cowboy e lo zar"	Luciano Beretta, Miki Del Prete	Dickie Thompson, Rusty Keefer	2:45
2.	"Il grande sarto"	Luciano Beretta, Miki Del Prete	Gino Santercole, Nando de Luca	3:09
3.	"L'ora del Boogie"	Luciano Beretta, Miki Del Prete	Bill Haley, Johnny Grande, Billy Williamson	2:11
4.	"Il filo di Arianna"	Luciano Beretta, Miki Del Prete	Gino Santercole, Nando de Luca	2:22
5.	"Miseria nera"	Luciano Beretta, Miki Del Prete	Gino Santercole, Nando de Luca	2:21

== Charts ==
Chart (1969)	Peak position
Italy (Musica e dischi)	4
