= Azzurro / Una carezza in un pugno =

Studio album by Adriano Celentano
- Released: 1968
- Label: Clan Celentano

Adriano Celentano chronology
Il ragazzo della via Gluck (1966)	Azzurro / Una carezza in un pugno (1968)	Adriano rock (1968)

Professional ratings
Review scores
Source	Rating
AllMusic	3/5 stars

Azzurro / Una carezza in un pugno is a studio album by Italian singer Adriano Celentano, released in 1968 on his label Clan Celentano. Claudia Mori appears on several tracks.

The double title was chosen by Celentano to emphasize that both songs, which had been hugely successful as the A and B sides of the corresponding single and which became two iconic songs in his repertoire, both deserved to title the album. It is the last Celentano's studio album to include Don Backy's songs.

== Track listing ==
Side 1
No.	Title	Lyrics	Music	Length
1.	"Una carezza in un pugno"	Luciano Beretta, Miki Del Prete	Gino Santercole, Nando de Luca	2:56
2.	"30 donne del West"	Luciano Beretta, Miki Del Prete	Adriano Celentano, Mariano Detto	3:20
3.	"Canzone"	Don Backy	Don Backy, Mariano Detto	2:40
4.	"Eravamo in 100.000"	Luciano Beretta, Miki Del Prete	Adriano Celentano, Mariano Detto	2:26
5.	"Torno sui miei passi"	Luciano Beretta, Miki Del Prete	Mariano Detto	3:12
6.	"La lotta dell'amore"	Luciano Beretta, Miki Del Prete	Gino Santercole, Mariano Detto	2:21

Side 2
No.	Title	Lyrics	Music	Length
1.	"Azzurro"	Vito Pallavicini	Paolo Conte, Michele Virano	3:40
2.	"Più forte che puoi"	Luciano Beretta, Miki Del Prete	Ico Cerutti, Mariano Detto	2:48
3.	"Tre passi avanti"	Luciano Beretta, Miki Del Prete	Adriano Celentano, Mariano Detto	3:51
4.	"Un bimbo sul leone"	Luciano Beretta, Miki Del Prete	Gino Santercole, Nando de Luca	3:35
5.	"Buonasera signorina"	Carl Sigman	Peter De Rose	3:16
6.	"La coppia più bella del mondo"	Luciano Beretta, Miki Del Prete	Paolo Conte, Michele Virano	3:00
