= Il forestiero =

Studio album by Adriano Celentano
- Released: November 1970
- Label: Clan Celentano

Adriano Celentano chronology
| Le robe che ha detto Adriano (1969) | Il forestiero (1970) | Er più – Storia d'amore e di coltello (1971) |

Il forestiero (lit. 'A stranger') is a Christmas album by Italian singer Adriano Celentano, released in 1970 on his label Clan Celentano.

The title song is inspired by a gospel story of Jesus's encounter with a Samaritan woman at the well and the woman's exaltation when she realizes who he is.

== Track listing ==
| No. | Title | Writer(s) | Length |
|---|---|---|---|
| 1. | "Il forestiero" | Luciano Beretta, Miki Del Prete, Gino Santercole, Nando De Luca |
| 2. | "Cosa fai questa sera" | Mogol, Nando De Luca |
| 3. | "Addormentarmi così" | Biri, Vittorio Mascheroni |
| 4. | "Stivali e colbacco" | Del Prete, Fiorenzo Batacchi, Eros Sciorilli, Butrowsky |
| 5. | "Brutta" | Beretta, Del Prete, Santercole, De Luca |
| 6. | "Tu scendi dalle stelle" | Sant'Alfonso Maria de' Liguori |
| 7. | "Bianco Natale" | Filibello, Irving Berlin |
| 8. | "Santa notte" | A. Cavalieri, Adolphe Adam |
| 9. | "Natale '70" | Beretta, Del Prete, Giuseppe Verdecchia, De Luca |
| 10. | "Jingle Bells" | Francesco Specchia, James Lord Pierpont |

Il forestiero – 1995 reissue bonus track
| No. | Title | Writer(s) | Length |
|---|---|---|---|
| 11. | "Bambini iei" | Celentano, Beretta, Del Prete |
