= C'è sempre un motivo =

Studio album by Adriano Celentano
- Released: 2004
- Label: Clan

Adriano Celentano chronology
Per sempre (2002)	C'è sempre un motivo (2004)	Dormi amore, la situazione non è buona (2007)

Professional ratings
Review scores
Source	Rating
Suono	positive
Rolling Stone (Russia)	5/5 stars
Music.com.ua	8/10 stars
Fuzz	positive
Freequency	3/5 stars

C'è sempre un motivo is a studio album by Italian singer Adriano Celentano, released in 2004 on his label Clan.

== Track listing ==
No.	Title	Lyrics	Music	Length
1.	"Ancora vivo"	Mogol	Gianni Bella	4:32
2.	"Marì Marì"	Mogol	Bella	4:15
3.	"C'è sempre un motivo"	Carlo Mazzoni	Mazzoni	5:27
4.	"Valeva la pena"	Cheope	Daniel Vuletic	4:10
5.	"Lunfardia"	Roberto Ferri, Fabrizio De André	Ferri	5:03
6.	"Verità da marciapiede"	Mogol	Gianni and Rosario Bella	4:33
7.	"Quel Casinha"	Luciano Beretta, Miki Del Prete, Teofilo Chantre	Adriano Celentano, Detto Mariano	4:28
8.	"L'ultima donna che amo"	Mogol	Bella	3:50
9.	"In quale vita"	Mogol, Celentano	Bella	4:48
10.	"Proibito"	Mogol	Bella	4:07
11.	"Vengo dal jazz"	Celentano	Artie Kaplan, Artie Kornfeld	3:56

== Charts ==
Chart (2004–2005)	Peak position
Italian Albums (FIMI)	2
Italian Albums (Musica e dischi)	2
Swiss Albums (Schweizer Hitparade)	20

C'è sempre un motivo (repack)

Chart (2005)	Peak position
Italian Albums (Musica e dischi)	24
