= Disco dance (album) =

Studio album by Adriano Celentano
- Released: 1977
- Label: Clan Celentano

Adriano Celentano chronology
Svalutation (1976)	Disco dance (1977)	Tecadisk (1977)

Disco dance is a studio album by Italian singer Adriano Celentano, released in 1977 on his label Clan Celentano.

== Track listing ==
No.	Title	Writer(s)	Length
1.	"Azzurro"	Paolo Conte, Vito Pallavicini	1:15
2.	"A Woman in Love / Rock Around the Clock"	Frank Loesser, James E. Myers, Max C. Freedman	4:04
3.	"Pregherò"	Don Backy, Ben E. King, Elmo Glick	5:33
4.	"Ma che freddo stasera (Such a Cold Night Tonight)"	Gino Santercole	7:55
5.	"Don't Play That Song (You Lied)"	Ahmet Ertegun, Betty Nelson	5:10
6.	"Nata per me"	Adriano Celentano, Miki Del Prete, Mogol	4:32
7.	"Bei tempi"	Natale Massara	1:10
8.	"Mondo in mi 7a"	Adriano Celentano, Luciano Beretta, Miki Del Prete	5:35

== Charts ==
Chart (1977)	Peak position
Italy (Musica e dischi)	9

== Certifications ==
Region	Certification	Certified units/sales
France (SNEP)	Gold	100,000^{*}
^{*} Sales figures based on certification alone.
