= Svalutation =

Studio album by Adriano Celentano
- Released: 1976
- Genre: Pop music
- Length: 34:04
- Label: Clan Celentano
- Producer: Clan Celentano

Adriano Celentano chronology
Yuppi du (1975)	Svalutation (1976)	Disco dance (1977)

Svalutation (Italian pronunciation: [svaluˈteʃʃon]) is the 16th album by Italian singer Adriano Celentano, issued in 1976. The word svalutation is a mock English word coined after the Italian svalutazione, which correctly translates to "devaluation", and the title track ironizes on the Italian economical and political crisis of the time.

The album named a television musical variety show, written and presented by the same Celentano and broadcast on Rai 3 in 1992.

== Track listing ==
No.	Title	Writer(s)	Length
1.	"I Want to Know (Parte 1a)"	Gino Santercole, Adriano Celentano, Luciano Beretta	2:48
2.	"Svalutation"	Santercole, Celentano, Vito Pallavicini, Beretta	3:06
3.	"La camera 21"	Santercole, Pallavicini, Beretta	5:23
4.	"La neve"	Santercole, Celentano, Beretta	7:00
5.	"Uomo macchina"	Santercole	3:42
6.	"La barca"	Santercole, Celentano, Pallavicini, Beretta	4:41
7.	"Ricordo"	Celentano	4:05
8.	"I Want to Know (Parte 2a)"	Santercole, Celentano, Beretta	5:21

== Charts ==
Chart (1976)	Peak position
Italian Albums (Musica e dischi)	7
Chart (2002)	Peak position
French Albums (SNEP)	49^{*}

* Svalutation / Nostalrock
