= Quel punto =

Studio album by Adriano Celentano
- Released: 1994
- Label: Clan

Adriano Celentano chronology
| Il re degli ignoranti (1991) | Quel punto (1994) | Arrivano gli uomini (1996) |

Professional ratings
Review scores
| Source | Rating |
|---|---|
| AllMusic | 3/5 stars |
| Staimusic | positive |

Quel punto is a studio album by Italian singer Adriano Celentano, released in 1994 on his label Clan.

The track "Il seme del rap" is a rap remake of Celentano's old hit "Prisencolinensinainciusol" — the song with which, as the singer has claimed, he invented rap.

Sometime after release, the album was withdrawn from stores. Officially it was done due to copyright problems. But it has been speculated that it was because of low sales and the controversy surrounding the title track, "Quel punto". Soon after, Celentano, for the first time in 15 years, went on a concert tour. Accompanying him on the tour was his daughter Rosita, who was promoting her album titled FDM.

== Track listing ==
| No. | Title | Writer(s) | Length |
|---|---|---|---|
| 1. | "Quel punto" | Adriano Celentano, Mauro Spina | 5:35 |
| 2. | "La casa dell'amore" | Celentano, Maurizio Fabrizio | 4:27 |
| 3. | "Rap" | Celentano, Lee Ronnie | 1:11 |
| 4. | "Il seme del rap" | Celentano | 4:16 |
| 5. | "Attraverso me" | Celentano, Fabrizio | 5:13 |
| 6. | "I want to know, Pt. 1" | Luciano Beretta, Celentano, Gino Santercole | 2:28 |
| 7. | "I want to know, Pt. 2" | Beretta, Celentano, Santercole | 6:54 |
| 8. | "La trappola" | Celentano, Spina | 5:58 |
| 9. | "Ja tebia liubliu" | Claudia Mori, Fabrizio Berlincioni, Spina | 5:34 |
| 10. | "La camera 21" | Vito Pallavicini, Beretta, Santercole | 5:47 |
| 11. | "Uh... uh..." | Celentano | 4:36 |
| 12. | "Rifugio bianco" | Bepi De Marzi | 1:48 |
| 13. | "Sanmatìo" | De Marzi | 2:48 |

== Charts ==
| Chart (1994) | Peak position |
|---|---|
| Italian Albums (Musica e dischi) | 9 |
| Swiss Albums (Schweizer Hitparade) | 23 |
