= Il ragazzo della via Gluck (album) =

Studio album by Adriano Celentano
- Released: 1966
- Label: Clan Celentano

Adriano Celentano chronology
La festa (1966)	Il ragazzo della via Gluck (1966)	Azzurro / Una carezza in un pugno (1968)

Professional ratings
Review scores
Source	Rating
AllMusic	3/5 stars

Il ragazzo della via Gluck is a studio album by Italian singer Adriano Celentano, released in 1966 on his label Clan Celentano.

On this album he is accompanied by I Ribelli.

== Track listing ==
Side A
No.	Title	Length
1.	"Il ragazzo della via Gluck"	4:13
2.	"È inutile davvero"	2:32
3.	"Ciao ragazzi"	2:33
4.	"E voi ballate"	2:55
5.	"Chi ce l'ha con me"	3:18
6.	"Non mi dir"	2:11
7.	"Uno strano tipo"	2:03

Side B
No.	Title	Length
1.	"Il mio amico James Bond"	2:07
2.	"La festa"	3:40
3.	"Chi era lui"	2:48
4.	"Sono un simpatico"	2:42
5.	"Il problema più importante"	2:30
6.	"Due tipi come noi"	2:06
7.	"Ringo"	3:08
