= La pubblica ottusità =

Studio album by Adriano Celentano
- Released: 1987
- Label: Clan

Adriano Celentano chronology
I miei americani... 2 (1986)	La pubblica ottusità (1987)	Il re degli ignoranti (1991)

La pubblica ottusità is a studio album by Italian singer Adriano Celentano, released in 1987 on his label Clan.

L'espresso called the album "the absolute epitome of stellar and paradisiacal plebeianism".

== Track listing ==
Side 1
No.	Title	Writer(s)	Length
1.	"La pubblica ottusità"	Adriano Celentano, Roberto Soffici	6:06
2.	"Dolce Rompi"	Giancarlo Bigazzi, Gianna Albini, Oscar Prudente	3:57
3.	"È ancora sabato"	Giorgio Calabrese, Pinuccio Pirazzoli, Ronald Jackson	4:21
4.	"Fresco"	Gino Santercole, Miki Del Prete	3:15

Side 2
No.	Title	Writer(s)	Length
1.	"L'ultimo gigante [medley with "Rock Around the Clock"]"	Sebastiano Barbagallo, Celentano, J. De Knight, Max C. Freedman	3:59
2.	"C'è qualcosa che non va"	Celentano	4:58
3.	"Mi attrai"	Bigazzi, Albini	3:31
4.	"La luce del sole"	Celentano, Pirazzoli	6:03

== Charts ==
Chart (1987)	Peak position
Italy (Musica e dischi)	1
