= I mali del secolo =

Studio album by Adriano Celentano
- Released: 1972
- Label: Clan Celentano

Adriano Celentano chronology
Er più – Storia d'amore e di coltello (1971)	I mali del secolo (1972)	Nostalrock (1973)

I mali del secolo (lit. 'The century's evils') is a studio album by Italian singer Adriano Celentano, released in 1972 on his label Clan Celentano.

According to the book Adriano Celentano. Incorrigible Romantic and Rebel, it is "a very important album" in Celentano's discography. All the songs on the album talk about the issues "the singer felt the need to talk about". Celentano wrote all the songs himself, except the first one, the rock'n'roll standard "Ready Teddy", which "seems to demonstrate Adriano's music preferences" and energetically starts the album off. Side 2 opens with the song "Disse", in which the singer "addresses people on behalf of God." In other songs, as the book's author notes, Celentano "talks about pressing social problems: corruption, speculation, drugs, urbanization, environmental pollution, that is, about everything that can be called the evils of the century."

== Track listing ==
All tracks are written by Adriano Celentano except where indicated.

Side 1
No.	Title	Writer(s)	Length
1.	"Ready Teddy"	Robert Blackwell, John Marascalco	3:07
2.	"Un albero di trenta piani"		4:02
3.	"Forse eri meglio di lei"		5:26
4.	"La ballata di Pinocchio"		6:44

Side 2
No.	Title	Length
1.	"Disse"	4:20
2.	"La siringhetta"	4:42
3.	"L'ultimo degli uccelli"	4:47
4.	"Quel signore del piano di sopra" (*)	5:18

(*) Versione in lingua celentana — 2:39
Versione in lingua italiana — 2:39 (Lyrics by Luciano Beretta, Celentano, Miki Del Prete)

== Charts ==
Chart (1972)	Peak position
Italy (Musica e dischi)	4
