= Ti avrò (song) =

1978 single by Adriano Celentano

Single by Adriano Celentano

from the album Ti avrò
- Released: 1978
- Label: Clan

Adriano Celentano singles chronology
"When Love..." (1977)	"Ti avrò" (1978)	"Che cosa ti farei" (1978)

Audio
- "Ti avrò" on YouTube

"Ti avrò" ('I will have you') is a song by Italian singer Adriano Celentano, released in 1978 on his label Clan. It was the leading single of the eponymous album.

== Overview ==
The song marked the beginning of the collaboration between Celentano and Cristiano Minellono. The song was disliked by Alfredo Cerruti, the artistic director of Compagnia Generale del Disco, the record company distributing Clan albums, who initially was able to convince Celentano to do not record it. Eventually Celentano grew increasingly appreciative of the song's qualities, up to the point to choose it as leading single of its album.

== Track listing ==
No.	Title	Writer(s)	Length
1.	"Ti avrò"	Cristiano Minellono, Danny B. Besquet, Ronnie Jackson	6:47
2.	"La moglie, l'amante, l'amica"	Cristiano Malgioglio, Besquet, Jackson	7:03

== Charts ==
Chart (1978)	Peak position
Italy (Musica e dischi)	1
