= Arrivano gli uomini =

Studio album by Adriano Celentano
- Released: 1996
- Label: Clan

Adriano Celentano chronology
| Quel punto (1994) | Arrivano gli uomini (1996) | Mina Celentano (1998) |

Professional ratings
Review scores
| Source | Rating |
|---|---|
| AllMusic | 3/5 stars |
| Staimusic | positive |

Arrivano gli uomini Arrivano gli uomini is a studio album by Italian singer Adriano Celentano, released in 1996 on his label Clan.

== Track listing ==
| No. | Title | Writer(s) | Length |
|---|---|---|---|
| 1. | "Così come sei" | Carlo Mazzoni | 4:51 |
| 2. | "Arrivano gli uomini" | Adriano Celentano | 5:58 |
| 3. | "Torno a settembre" | Corrado Conti, Matteo Maria Pace, Attilio Pace | 4:56 |
| 4. | "Balla con me" | Adriano Celentano, Fio Zanotti | 7:20 |
| 5. | "Scusami" | Adriano Celentano, Miki Del Prete, D.B. Besquet, Ronald Jackson | 5:59 |
| 6. | "Solo da un quarto d'ora" | Adriano Celentano | 5:35 |
| 7. | "Ti lascio vivere" | Fabrizio Berlincioni, Mauro Spina | 4:35 |
| 8. | "Ti lascio vivere" (Reprise) | Adriano Celentano | 2:00 |
| 9. | "Vento d'estate" | Adriano Celentano, Giacomo Celentano | 5:43 |
| 10. | "Cercami" | Enzo Gragnaniello | 4:43 |
| 11. | "La gonna e l'insalata" | Adriano Celentano | 5:06 |

== Charts ==
| Chart (1996) | Peak position |
|---|---|
| Austrian Albums (Ö3 Austria) | 16 |
| Italian Albums (Musica e dischi) | 10 |
| Swiss Albums (Schweizer Hitparade) | 41 |
