= Maeba (album) =

Studio album by Mina
- Released: 23 March 2018
- Recorded: 2017
- Studio: PDU Studios in Lugano
- Genre: Pop
- Length: 46:15
- Label: PDU, Sony Music Italy
- Producer: Massimiliano Pani

Mina chronology
Tutte le migliori (2017)	Maeba (2018)	Paradiso (Lucio Battisti Songbook) (2018)

Singles from Maeba
- 1. "Volevo scriverti da tanto" Released: 9 March 2018

Professional ratings
Review scores
Source	Rating
All Music Italia	3.5/5 stars
FareMusic	4/5 stars
Rockol	8/10
Rolling Stone	4/5 stars

Maeba is the 74th studio album by Italian singer Mina released on 23 March 2018 by PDU Music&Production and Sony Music Italy. It contains ten new songs and two covers, and is available in digital download, CD, and vinyl. The first single was the opening track "Volevo scriverti da tanto", and was released on 9 March 2018.

== Background ==
After the released of Le migliori with Adriano Celentano in 2016, Mina came back in 2018 with Maeba, her first solo studio album since Selfie in 2014. The cover art shows the singer like an alien, an image already used as a hologram during the final of Sanremo Festival 2018 and on the cover of Piccolino, Mina's 2011 album. The album features 12 tracks and a 'surprise' for fans. Mina's son, Massimiliano Pani, produced and arranged the songs, which span many genres ranging from rhythm & blues to electronics, from rock to jazz. The album also contains songs sung in three languages: Italian, English, and Neapolitan. It was recorded and mixed at the PDU studios in Lugano, the strings were recorded at the Officine Meccaniche studio in Milan, while the mastering and transfer were performed by Alessandro Di Guglielmo at the Elettroformati studio.

== Singles ==
The first single released from the album was “Volevo scriverti da tanto”, a striking and emotional melodic ballad creating an atmosphere for the listener only Mina knows how to create: one of those songs that needs a great interpreter to express it fully. The composer is Moreno Ferrara, one of the most important Italian choristers, while the lyrics were written by Maria Francesca Polli, who has collaborated in the past with Roby Facchinetti, Claudio Baglioni, and Franco Fasano. The lyrics are a yearning letter to a person who can never read it.

== Track listing ==
No.	Title	Writer(s)	Producer(s)	Length
1.	"Volevo scriverti da tanto"	music: Moreno Ferrara – lyrics: Maria Francesca Polli	Moreno Ferrara; Massimiliano Pani	4:27
2.	"Il mio amore disperato"	music: Alberto Anelli – lyrics: Paolo Limiti		3:36
3.	"Ti meriti l'inferno"	music & lyrics: Federico Spagnoli	Federico Spagnoli; Andrea Surdi	4:34
4.	"Il tuo arredamento"	music & lyrics: Mariano Rongo	Mariano Rongo	4:59
5.	"Argini"	music: Marco Ciappelli, Francesco Sighieri, Lele Fontana – lyrics: Marco Ciappelli, Francesco Sighieri		4:32
6.	"Last Christmas"	George Michael		3:25
7.	"'A minestrina (feat. Paolo Conte)"	Paolo Conte		3:17
8.	"Heartbreak Hotel"	Mae Boren Axton; Thomas Durden; Elvis Presley		2:22
9.	"Al di là del fiume"	music: Franco Serafini – lyrics: Giorgio Calabrese	Franco Serafini	3:25
10.	"Troppe note"	music: Franco Serafini – lyrics: Viola Serafini		4:06
11.	"Ci vuole un po' di R'n'R"	music: Maurizio Tirelli, Andrea Mingardi – lyrics: Andrea Mingardi		3:18
12.	"Un soffio (feat. Boosta)"	music: Davide Dileo – lyrics: Luca Ragazzini		4:14

== Charts ==
=== Weekly charts ===
Weekly chart performance for Maeba
Chart (2018)	Peak position
Italian Albums (FIMI)	1
Italian Vinyl Albums (FIMI)	1
Swiss Albums (Schweizer Hitparade)	35

=== Year-end charts ===
Year-end chart performance for Maeba
Chart (2018)	Position
Italian Albums (FIMI)	50
Italian Vinyl Albums (FIMI)	16

== Certifications and sales ==
Certifications for Maeba
Region	Certification	Certified units/sales
Italy (FIMI)	Gold	25,000^{‡}
^{‡} Sales+streaming figures based on certification alone.
