= Parlo (disambiguation) =

Parlo (1951–1978) was an American thoroughbred champion racehorse.

Parlo may also refer to:

== Entertainment ==
- Così parlò Bellavista, 1984 Italian film
- Esco di rado e parlo ancora meno, 2000 studio album by Adriano Celentano

== People ==
- Dita Parlo (1908–1971), German actress
- Mikkel Parlo (born 1990), Danish mixed martial artist.
