= Yuppi du (album) =

Soundtrack album by Adriano Celentano
- Released: 1975
- Label: Clan Celentano

Adriano Celentano chronology
Nostalrock (1973)	Yuppi du (1975)	Svalutation (1976)

Colonna sonora originale del film "Yuppi du", or simply Yuppi du, is a soundtrack album by Adriano Celentano featuring music and songs from the 1975 film Yuppi du that he wrote, produced, directed, wrote music for and starred in. The album was released by Celentano's record label Clan Celentano in the same year.

== Track listing ==
All music is composed by Adriano Celentano, except where noted.

Side 1
No.	Title	Length
1.	"L'affondamento"
2.	"La messa"
3.	"A chi stai pensando?"
4.	"Va' chi c'è!"
5.	"La ballata"
6.	"La passerella"

Side 2
No.	Title	Writer(s)	Vocals	Length
1.	"Such a Cold Night To Night"	Gino Santercole	Gino Santercole
2.	"La violenza"
3.	"Do dap"	Claudia Mori	Rosita, Rosalinda and Giacomo Celentano
4.	"Yuppi du"
5.	"Il castagnaro"
6.	"Il finale"
7.	"Yuppi du"		Adriano Celentano

== Charts ==
Chart (1975)	Peak position
Italy (Musica e dischi)	2
