= Pop Life =

Pop Life or Poplife may refer to:

== Music ==
- Pop Life (Bananarama album), 1991
- Pop Life (David Guetta album), 2007
- Pop Life (Breathe album), 1998
- Poplife Presents: Poplife Sucks – 2008 compilation album
- "Pop Life" (song), 1985
- Pop Life, an album by 7th Heaven

== Television ==
- Pop Life TV, a Filipino TV channel
- Pop Life (TV series), a British documentary series about pop music
