= Per sempre (Adriano Celentano album) =

Studio album by Adriano Celentano
- Released: 2002
- Label: Clan

Adriano Celentano chronology
Esco di rado e parlo ancora meno (2000)	Per sempre (2002)	C'è sempre un motivo (2004)

Professional ratings
Review scores
Source	Rating
Rockol	mixed
Newslab	positive
Tektonika	positive

Per sempre is a studio album by Italian singer Adriano Celentano, released in 2002 on his label Clan.

== Track listing ==
No.	Title	Lyrics	Music	Length
1.	"Confessa"	Mogol	Gianni Bella	5:10
2.	"Mi fa male"	Mogol	Bella	4:49
3.	"Più di un sogno"	Mogol	Bella	5:21
4.	"Per sempre"	Stefano Pieroni	Bella	5:13
5.	"Una luce intermittente"	Mogol	Bella	4:42
6.	"Respiri di vita"	Mogol	Bella	4:13
7.	"Dimenticare e ricominciare"	Mogol	Bella	3:45
8.	"Vite"	Francesco Guccini	Guccini	4:38
9.	"Pensieri nascosti"	Mogol	Bella	4:27
10.	"I passi che facciamo"	Pacifico	Philippe Leon	5:37
11.	"Per vivere"	Mogol	Celentano	5:57
12.	"Radio Chick"	Mogol	Bella	3:22

== Charts ==
Chart (2002)	Peak position
Italian Albums (FIMI)	1
Italian Albums (Musica e dischi)	2
Swiss Albums (Schweizer Hitparade)	11
