= Ti avrò =

1978 album by Adriano Celentano

Studio album by Adriano Celentano
- Released: 1978
- Label: Clan
- Producer: Danny B. Besquet; Miki Del Prete

Adriano Celentano chronology
Tecadisk (1977)	Ti avrò (1978)	Geppo il folle (1978)

Ti avrò (lit. 'I will have you') is a studio album by Italian singer Adriano Celentano, released in 1978 on his label Clan.

== Overview ==
Following a series of albums characterized by protest songs, covers and dance songs, Ti avrò marked the return of Celentano to a more classical romantic repertoire. The songs on the album all have love as their main theme and feature long instrumental intros. The album was released on 28 April 1978.

== Track listing ==
No.	Title	Writer(s)	Length
1.	"Ti avrò"	Cristiano Minellono, Danny B. Besquet, Ronnie Jackson	6:47
2.	"Se vuoi andare vai"	Minellono, Besquet, Jackson	6:10
3.	"Vetrina"	Adriano Celentano	4:14
4.	"Che donna"	Cristiano Malgioglio, Besquet, Jackson	6:02
5.	"Lascerò"	Malgioglio, Jackson	5:42
6.	"La moglie, l'amante, l'amica"	Malgioglio, Besquet, Jackson	7:03

== Charts ==
Chart (1978)	Peak position
Italy (Musica e dischi)	2
