= Poplife Presents: Poplife Sucks =

2008 compilation album by various artists

Compilation album by various artists
- Released: 2 September 2008
- Label: News 541

Poplife Presents: Poplife Sucks is a compilation of dance tracks inspired by the Poplife parties that started in Belgium in 1998. The tracks were compiled by the Glimmers and Olivier Tjon, who started the parties in an effort to contrast with the house and techno parties of the time by mixing a variety of musical styles together. The compilation reflects that eclectic goal combining various types and eras of music marking the tenth anniversary of the party.

== Reception ==
Professional ratings
Review scores
Source	Rating
Allmusic	3.5/5 stars
XLR8R	(7/10)

Steven Hammond writes that the album is "a schizophrenic collage of styles and artists" and the reason it "works is because it is produced as a dance mix with seamless transitions between each song" but goes on to warn listeners that "a CD that mashes together extremely different genres of music could sound like one giant headache". Michaelangelo Matos called it the compilation of 2008, saying it "speaks to the present" "without succumbing to retro cute or wedding-DJ cheesiness" calling the track list "a smart collector’s want list". Rick Anderson refers to the compilation as "defiant eclecticism". Tony Ware calls the tracks "sonically engaging without being self-absorbed". The album has also been called "all-inclusive party celebrating dance music across all genres that doesn't discriminate" and "an endlessly playable party mix that ranges freely from the ’70s to the ’00s".

== Cover art ==
The cover art has been listed as among the worst of the decade. The style is reminiscent of Patrick Nagel's work with Playboy, depicting a dead-eyed woman with a candy cane or barber's pole emerging from her mouth and wrapping all the way around the CD case. It has been called not "sexy or funny, just off-putting" and "horrible".

== Track list ==
No.	Title	Writer(s)	Performer	Length
1.	"Welcome to the Pleasuredome"	Peter Gill/Holly Johnson/Mark O'Toole	Frankie Goes to Hollywood	1:06
2.	"The Time Is Now"	Mark Brydon/Róisín Murphy	Moloko	4:48
3.	"Il Veliero"	Lucio Battisti/Mogol Audio 2	Chaplin Band	4:14
4.	"Prisencolinensinainciusol"	Adriano Celentano	Adriano Celentano	3:33
5.	"Adolescent Sex"	David Sylvian	Japan	3:50
6.	"Making Me Money" (Switch Remix)	Jacknife Lee	Jacknife Lee	4:37
7.	"Sharp as a Knife"	Brandon Cooke/Roxanne Shanté	Brandon Cooke and Roxanne Shanté	2:46
8.	"We Are Your Friends"	James Ford/James Shaw	Simian Mobile Disco	3:53
9.	"Abele Dance"	Manu Dibango/Fabien Meissonier	Manu Dibango	2:59
10.	"La Raza"	Tony Gonzales/Arturo Molina Jr./Gerald Wilson	Kid Frost	3:09
11.	"Cavern"	Scott Hartley/Richard McGuire/Salvatore Principato/Dennis Young	Liquid Liquid	3:45
12.	"Jungle Love"	Morris Day/Jesse Johnson	Time	4:13
13.	"Physical"	Steve Kipner/Terry Shaddick	Glimmers	3:36
14.	"Los Niños del Parque"	Beate Bartel/Chris Haas	Liaisons Dangereuses	3:08
15.	"Where Are You?"	Luca Anzilotti/Michael Münzing	Sixteen Bit	3:48
16.	"Move Your Ass and Feel the Beat"	Morton/Sherman	Erotic Dissidents	3:52
17.	"Welcome to the Pleasuredome" (Fruitless Mix)	Peter Gill/Holly Johnson/Mark O'Toole	Frankie Goes to Hollywood	4:04
18.	"Don't Lose Control"	Bill Laswell/Michael Beinhorn	Material	4:15
19.	"Windowlicker"	Richard D. James	Aphex Twin	5:50
