= Tecadisk =

Studio album by Adriano Celentano
- Released: 1977
- Label: Clan Celentano

Adriano Celentano chronology
Disco dance (1977)	Tecadisk (1977)	Ti avrò (1978)

Professional ratings
Review scores
Source	Rating
AllMusic	3/5 stars

Tecadisk is a studio album by Italian singer Adriano Celentano, released in 1977 on his label Clan Celentano.

== Track listing ==
Side 1
No.	Title	Length
1.	"When Love..."	6:50
2.	"Yes, I Do"	6:17
3.	"Wartime Melodies"	4:28

Side 2
No.	Title	Length
1.	"Somebody Save Me"	6:30
2.	"Kiss Me Goodbye"	5:50
3.	"You Can Be Happy"	6:03
Total length:		35:48

== Charts ==
=== Weekly charts ===
Chart (1977)	Peak position
Italy (Musica e dischi)	5

=== Monthly charts ===
Monthly chart performance for Tecadisk
Chart (1981)	Peak position
Soviet Albums (Moskovskij Komsomolets)	5

=== Year-end charts ===
Year-end chart performance for Tecadisk
Chart (1981)	Position
Soviet Albums (Moskovskij Komsomolets)	6
