= Il re degli ignoranti =

Studio album by Adriano Celentano
- Released: 1991
- Label: Clan

Adriano Celentano chronology
La pubblica ottusità (1987)	Il re degli ignoranti (1991)	Quel punto (1994)

Professional ratings
Review scores
Source	Rating
Staimusic	mixed

Il re degli ignoranti is a studio album by Italian singer Adriano Celentano, released in 1991 on his label Clan.

This album marked the singer's comeback from his voluntary retirement of several years. This time, he worked with a new team of arrangers, updating his sound to a more current.

The album is difficult to classify as a single genre; it ranges from rock to pop, to electronic, to symphonic.

It has been noted that while the album might not have been of "high quality", it brought the singer back into the charts and into public limelight. Celentano would even subsequently return on television, working with Bruno Gambarotta once again.

== Track listing ==
Side 1
No.	Title	Writer(s)	Length
1.	"Il re degli ignoranti"	Adriano Celentano	6:04
2.	"Letto di foglie"	Celentano, D.B. Besquet, Ronnie Jackson	5:38
3.	"L'uomo di Bagdad il cow-boy e lo zar"	Celentano, Luciano Beretta, Dickie Thompson	4:49
4.	"Preludio imperiale"	Celentano	0:48
5.	"La più migliore"	Celentano, Mauro Spina	4:23

Side 2
No.	Title	Writer(s)	Length
1.	"La terza guerra mondiale"	Celentano	4:31
2.	"Preludio vento del passato"	Davide Romani	1:10
3.	"Fuoco"	Celentano, Romani, Spina	5:37
4.	"Buono come il pane"	Celentano, Luca Cersosimo	5:43
5.	"Cammino"	Celentano	6:05

== Charts ==
Chart (1994)	Peak position
Italian Albums (Musica e dischi)	4
Austrian Albums (Ö3 Austria)	37
