= Nostalrock =

Studio album by Adriano Celentano
- Released: 1973
- Label: Clan Celentano

Adriano Celentano chronology
I mali del secolo (1972)	Nostalrock (1973)	Yuppi du (1975)

Professional ratings
Review scores
Source	Rating
AllMusic	3/5 stars

Nostalrock is a studio album by Italian singer Adriano Celentano, released in 1973 on his label Clan Celentano.

According to the book Adriano Celentano. Incorrigible Romantic and Rebel, on this album Celentano "recalls the time when rock was born and covers famous hits of that era".

According to the same book, the second song on side 1, with the unpronounceable title "Prisencolinensinainciusol", has been officially recognized as the first rap song since 2009. "This song is written in a new language that no one understands. It has only one meaning — universal love," stated Celentano in 1974.

== Track listing ==
Side 1
No.	Title	Length
1.	"Pensylvania 65000" (frammento)
2.	"Prisencolinensinainciusol"
3.	"Sul cappello (Le penne nere)" (frammento)
4.	"Send Me Some Lovin'"
5.	"Guitar Boogie" (frammento)
6.	"Only You"
7.	"Guitar Boogie" (frammento)
8.	"Lotta Lovin'"
9.	"I Will Drink the Wine"

Side 2
No.	Title	Length
1.	"Tutti Frutti"
2.	"In the Mood" (frammento)
3.	"We're Gonna Move"
4.	"Cry"
5.	"Di qua e di là del Piave" (frammento)
6.	"Be-Bop-A-Lula"
7.	"Shake Rattle an' Roll"

== Charts ==
Chart (1974)	Peak position
Italy (Musica e dischi)	16
Chart (2002)	Peak position
French Albums (SNEP)	49^{*}

* Svalutation / Nostalrock
