= Geppo il folle (album) =

Soundtrack album by Adriano Celentano
- Released: 1978
- Label: Clan Celentano

Adriano Celentano chronology
Ti avrò (1978)	Geppo il folle (1978)	Soli (1979)

Colonna sonora originale del film "Geppo il folle", or simply Geppo il folle, is a soundtrack album by Adriano Celentano featuring music and songs from the 1978 film Geppo il folle that he wrote, directed and starred in. The album was released by Celentano's record label Clan Celentano in the same year.

== Track listing ==
Side 1
No.	Title	Writer(s)	Length
1.	"Geppo"	A. Celentano—A. Rutherford—C. Minellono	9:39
2.	"Hello America"	D. B. Besquet—R. Jackson	3:57
3.	"Happy to Be Dancing with You"	D. B. Besquet—R. Jackson	6:15

Side 2
No.	Title	Writer(s)	Length
1.	"Che cosa ti farei"	D. B. Besquet—C. Minellono	5:30
2.	"(Please) Stay a Little Longer"	D. B. Besquet—R. Jackson	5:51
3.	"Sei proprio tu" ("Don't Get Me Wrong")	D. B. Besquet—R. Jackson—C. Minellono	5:45

== Charts ==
Chart (1978)	Peak position
Italy (Musica e dischi)	7
