= Io non so parlar d'amore =

Studio album by Adriano Celentano
- Released: 1999
- Label: Clan

Adriano Celentano chronology
Mina Celentano (1998)	Io non so parlar d'amore (1999)	Esco di rado e parlo ancora meno (2000)

Professional ratings
Review scores
Source	Rating
AllMusic	4/5 stars
Recensiamo Musica	positive

Io non so parlar d'amore is a studio album by Italian singer Adriano Celentano, released in 1999 on his label Clan.

== Reception ==
The album spent 100 weeks on the Italian chart and sold close to two million copies.

The song "L'emozione non ha voce" (also known as "Io non so parlar d'amore" after its iconic opening line) has been called a "masterpiece". It talks about an incredibly strong love between two people.

== Track listing ==
All lyrics are written by Mogol except where indicated; all music is composed by Gianni Bella except where indicated.

No.	Title	Lyrics	Music	Length
1.	"Gelosia"			4:31
2.	"L'emozione non ha voce"			4:09
3.	"L'arcobaleno"			3:32
4.	"Una rosa pericolosa"	Mogol	Adriano Celentano	4:36
5.	"Qual è la direzione"			5:15
6.	"Angel"	Matteo Di Franco	Matteo Di Franco	5:09
7.	"L'uomo di cartone"			4:27
8.	"Le pesche d'inverno"			3:51
9.	"Senza amore"	Carlo Mazzoni	Carlo Mazzoni	5:00
10.	"Il sospetto"	Mogol	Fio Zanotti	4:34
11.	"Mi domando"			4:18
12.	"Sarai uno straccio"	Adriano Celentano	Adriano Celentano, Marco Vaccaro	5:39

== Charts and certifications ==
=== Weekly charts ===
Chart (1999)	Peak position
Italian Albums (FIMI)	1
Swiss Albums (Schweizer Hitparade)	25

=== Monthly charts ===
Chart (1991)	Peak position
Italian Albums (Musica e dischi)	1

=== Year-end charts ===
Chart (1991)	Peak position
Italian Albums (Musica e dischi)	1

=== Certification and sales ===
Region	Certification	Certified units/sales
Italy	—	1,800,000
Italy (FIMI) since 2009	Gold	25,000^{‡}
^{‡} Sales+streaming figures based on certification alone.

== Legacy ==
In 2021, the song "L'emozione non ha voce" was covered by Beatrice Grannò under the title "Io non so parlar d'amore".

== See also ==
- List of best-selling albums in Italy
- List of fastest-selling albums
