= I Ribelli =

- Origin: Italy
- Genres: Rock, beat
- Years active: 1959–1970; 1977; 1988; 2005
- Labels: Clan Celentano; Celson; Arcobal; Dischi Ricordi; CGD
- Website: I Ribelli.it

I Ribelli (English: The Rebels) were an Italian rock group. Originally formed in 1959 as Adriano Celentano's backup band, they later continued performing as an independent act. The band is best known for their cover versions of some of The Beatles' songs and Brian Poole & The Tremeloes' "Keep on Dancin'", entitled "Chi sarà la ragazza del Clan?", '"Who may be the girl of the Clan?"'. Some of the band members such as keyboardist Enzo Jannacci and guitarist Gino Santercole went on to successful solo careers.

== Members ==
- Gianni Dall'Aglio - drums
- Giorgio Benacchio - guitar
- Dino Pasquadibisceglie (1959–1964) - bass
- Gino Santercole (1959–1963) - vocal, guitar
- Enzo Jannacci (1959–1961) - keyboards
- Nando De Luca (1961–1962) - keyboards
- Ricky Gianco (1966–68) - guitar, vocals
- Giannino Zinzone (1961-1962) - bass
- Natale Massara (1961–1970) - vocal, saxophone, wind instruments
- Gianfranco Lombardi (1962–1963) - bass
- Jean Claude Bichara (1963–1966)- bass
- Angel Salvador (1966–1970) - bass
- Philippe Bichara (1963–1966) - vocals, percussion
- Demetrio Stratos (1966–1970) - vocals, keyboards
- Dino D'Autorio (1977) - bass

== Discography ==
=== Singles ===
- 1961 "Enrico VIII" / "200 all'ora" - (Celson, QB 8031)
- 1961 "Alle nove al bar" / "Danny boy"' - (Arcobal, R 6000)
- 1962 "La cavalcata" / "Serenata a Valle Chiara" - (Clan Celentano, ACC 24002)
- 1964 "Chi sarà la ragazza del Clan?" / "Quella donna" - (Clan Celentano, R 6002)
- 1966 "A la buena de dios" / "Ribelli" - (Clan Celentano, ACC 24034)
- 1966 "Per una lira" / "Ehi...voi!" - (Clan Celentano, ACC 24039)
- 1966 "Come Adriano" / "Enchinza bubu" - (Clan Celentano, ACC 24041)
- 1967 "Pugni chiusi" / "La follia" - (Dischi Ricordi, SRL 10451)
- 1967 "Chi mi aiuterà" / "Un giorno se ne va" - (Dischi Ricordi, SRL 10470)
- 1968 "Come sempre" / "Nel sole, nel vento, nel sorriso, nel pianto" - (Dischi Ricordi, SRL 10506)
- 1968 "Yummy Yummy Yummy" / "Un posto al sole" - (Dischi Ricordi, SRL 10514)
- 1969 "Obladì Obladà" / "Lei m'ama" - (Dischi Ricordi, SRL 10522)
- 1969 "Goodbye" / "Josephine" - (Dischi Ricordi, SRL 10549)
- 1970 "Oh! Darling!" / "Il vento non sa leggere" - (Dischi Ricordi, SRL 10579)
- 1977 "Illusione/Calore" - (Dischi Ricordi, SRL 10843)

=== LPs ===
- 1968 I Ribelli - (Dischi Ricordi, SMRP 9052)
- 1988 I Ribelli live - (CGD, LSM1315)

=== CDs ===
- 2002: I Ribelli (The Rebels). (Sony/BMG 191192)
- 2010: Cantano Adriano (Sing Adriano). (Indie Europe/Zoom 7794766)
