= Dormi amore, la situazione non è buona =

Studio album by Adriano Celentano
- Released: November 23, 2007
- Recorded: 2007
- Studio: Air Studio, Galbiate (LC)
- Genre: Pop rock, symphonic rock, blues
- Label: Ariola Records
- Producer: Clan Celentano

Adriano Celentano chronology
C'è sempre un motivo (2004)	Dormi amore, la situazione non è buona (2007)	Facciamo finta che sia vero (2011)

Singles from Dormi amore, la situazione non è buona
- 1. "Hai bucato la mia vita" Released: November 1, 2007; 2. "Dormi amore" Released: January 11, 2008; 3. "Aria non sei più tu…" Released: April 2, 2008; 4. "Fiori" Released: April 3, 2008

Dormi amore, la situazione non è buona (English: Sleep my love, the situation isn't good) is the 40th studio album by famous Italian singer and actor Adriano Celentano, issued November 23, 2007 by label Ariola Records. It was certified four times platinum by the Federation of the Italian Music Industry.

== Track listing ==
No.	Title	Lyrics	Music	Length
1.	"Hai bucato la mia vita"	Mogol	Gianni Bella	4:58
2.	"Aria… non sei più tu"	Jovanotti	Daniel Vuletic	4:28
3.	"Dormi amore"	Mogol	Gianni Bella	5:31
4.	"La situazione non è buona"	Tricarico	Tricarico	5:16
5.	"Ragazzo del sud"	Domenico Modugno	Domenico Modugno	5:34
6.	"Vorrei sapere"	Mogol	Gianni and Rosario Bella	4:04
7.	"Anna Magnani"	Vincenzo Cerami	Carmen Consoli	4:08
8.	"Fiori"	Neffa	Neffa	3:06
9.	"Fascino"	Mogol	Gianni Bella	3:54
10.	"I tuoi artigli"	Mogol	Gianni Bella	2:59
11.	"Extra" (Bonus)	—	—	4:47

== Charts ==
Chart	Peak position
Italy (FIMI)	2

== Certifications ==
Region	Certification	Certified units/sales
Russia (NFPF)	Gold	10,000^{*}
^{*} Sales figures based on certification alone.
