= Facciamo finta che sia vero =

Studio album by Adriano Celentano
- Released: November 29, 2011
- Recorded: 2011
- Studios: Air Studio, Galbiate (LC); Pinaxa Studio, Milan
- Genres: Pop rock, tango, cumbia
- Label: Universal Music
- Producer: Clan Celentano

Adriano Celentano chronology
| Dormi amore, la situazione non è buona (2007) | Facciamo finta che sia vero (2011) | Le migliori (2016) |

Singles from Facciamo finta che sia vero
- 1. "Non ti accorgevi di me" Released: October 22, 2011; 2. "Non so più cosa fare" Released: December 2, 2011; 3. "Ti penso e cambia il mondo" Released: January 13, 2012; 4. "Anna parte" Released: April 27, 2012; 5. "La cumbia di chi cambia" Released: June 1, 2012

Professional ratings
Review scores
| Source | Rating |
|---|---|
| SpazioRock | 8/10 stars |

Facciamo finta che sia vero (English: Let's pretend it's true) is the 41st studio album by famous Italian singer and actor Adriano Celentano, issued November 29, 2011 by label Universal Music.

== Track listing ==
| No. | Title | Lyrics | Music | Length |
|---|---|---|---|---|
| 1. | "Non ti accorgevi di me" (with Negramaro) | Giuliano Sangiorgi | Giuliano Sangiorgi | 3:10 |
| 2. | "Ti penso e cambia il mondo" | Pacifico | Stephen Lipson, Matteo Saggese | 4:25 |
| 3. | "Facciamo finta che sia vero" (with Franco Battiato) | Franco Battiato, Manlio Sgalambro | Nicola Piovani | 3:26 |
| 4. | "Non so più cosa fare" (with Sangiorgi, Battiato and Jovanotti) | Adriano Celentano | Manu Chao | 6:31 |
| 5. | "Anna parte" | Corrado and Camillo Castellari | Corrado Castellari | 3:25 |
| 6. | "Fuoco nel vento" | Jovanotti | Matteo Saggese | 4:22 |
| 7. | "La cumbia di chi cambia" | Jovanotti | Jovanotti | 4:13 |
| 8. | "La mezza luna" (with Raphael Gualazzi and Trilok Gurtu) | Fred Ignor | Heino Gaze | 3:29 |
| 9. | "Il mutuo" | Adriano Celentano | Adriano Celentano | 6:56 |

== Charts and certifications ==
=== Weekly charts ===
| Chart | Position |
|---|---|
| Italian Albums Chart | 3 |
| Russian Albums Chart | 8 |
| Swiss Albums Chart | 33 |

=== Year-end charts ===
| Chart (2011) | Position |
|---|---|
| Italian Albums Chart | 11 |

=== Certification ===
| Region | Certification | Certified units/sales |
|---|---|---|
| Italy (FIMI) | 3× Platinum | 180,000^{*} |
^{*} Sales figures based on certification alone.
