= Le migliori =

Studio album by Mina and Adriano Celentano
- Released: 11 November 2016
- Recorded: 2015–2016
- Studio: Studi PDU, Lugano; Studio Impatto, Bologna
- Genre: Pop
- Length: 43:47
- Label: Clan Celentano; PDU
- Producer: Massimiliano Pani; Claudia Mori

Mina chronology
Selfie (2014)	Le migliori (2016)	Maeba (2018)

Adriano Celentano chronology
Facciamo finta che sia vero (2011)	Le migliori (2016)	Adrian (2019)

Singles from Le migliori
- 1. "Amami amami" Released: 21 October 2016; 2. "A un passo da te" Released: 6 January 2017; 3. "Ma che ci faccio qui" Released: 24 March 2017; 4. "Se mi ami davvero" Released: 23 June 2017

Le migliori is an album by Italian singers Mina and Adriano Celentano. It was released on 11 November 2016 by Clan Celentano and PDU.

The lead single "Amami amami" was released on 21 October 2016. Le migliori was the best-selling album in 2016 in Italy. It sold more than 350,000 copies, being certified seven times platinum in Italy.

== Background ==
In March 2015, rumors began in the Italian press of another collaboration between Adriano Celentano and Mina following their 1998 successful album Mina Celentano. Celentano himself hinted at the possibility when he posted a message on his blog to congratulate Mina on her 75th birthday. On 20 October 2015, it was officially confirmed that the two artists would indeed be releasing a new album. At the time of the announcement, the album was scheduled to be released in the spring of 2016. As reported by the Corriere della Sera, recordings began in early summer 2015 and would take place in both Adriano Celentano's studio in Galbiate and Mina's studio in Lugano. The official release date of Le Migliori was finally set for 11 November 2016.

The album's title comes from a quote by Celentano on his blog speaking of their collaboration, meaning "(we are) the best ones". Surprisingly, Celentano used the first feminin plural. For this reason the cover artwork show Mina and Celentano in their younger and older version, with the latter in drag.

== Track listing ==
No.	Title	Lyrics	Music	Length
1.	"Amami amami"	Riccardo Sinigallia	Idan Raichel	3:19
2.	"E l'amore"	Andrea Mingardi	Mingardi; Maurizio Tirelli	3:39
3.	"Se mi ami davvero"	Gianmarco Marcello	Marcello	3:42
4.	"Ti lascio amore"	Salvatore Cutugno; Mauro Culotta; Fabrizio Berlincioni	Cutugno; Culotta; Berlincioni	5:13
5.	"A un passo da te (Ragione e sentimento)"	Fabio Ilacqua	Ilacqua	4:31
6.	"Non mi ami"	Salvatore Marletta; Federico Spagnoli; Walter Dallari	Marletta; Spagnoli	3:59
7.	"Ma che ci faccio qui"	Pietro Paletti	Paletti	4:01
8.	"Sono le tre"	Luca Rustici; Philippe Leon	Rustici; Leon	3:47
9.	"Il bambino col fucile" (performed only by Celentano)	Francesco Gabbani	Gabbani	2:45
10.	"Quando la smetterò" (performed only by Mina)	Loriana Lana	Aldo Donati	3:57
11.	"Come un diamante nascosto nella neve"	Marco Bruni	Bruni	3:46
12.	"Prisencolinensinainciusol" (Benny Benassi remix)	Adriano Celentano	Celentano	4:08
Total length:				43:47

== Charts ==
=== Weekly charts ===
Weekly chart performance for Le migliori
Chart (2016)	Peak position
Italian Albums (FIMI)	1
Italian Vinyl Albums (FIMI)	1
Swiss Albums (Schweizer Hitparade)	23
Swiss Albums (Les charts Romandy)	49

=== Year-end charts ===
2016 year-end chart performance for Le migliori
Chart (2019)	Position
Italian Albums (FIMI)	1
Italian Vinyl Albums (FIMI)	2

2017 year-end chart performance for Le migliori
Chart (2017)	Position
Italian Albums (FIMI)	4
Italian Vinyl Albums (FIMI)	5

2018 year-end chart performance for Le migliori
Chart (2018)	Position
Italian Albums (FIMI)	33

== Certifications and sales ==
Certifications for Le migliori
Region	Certification	Certified units/sales
Italy (FIMI)	7× Platinum	350,000^{‡}
^{‡} Sales+streaming figures based on certification alone.
