= Esco di rado e parlo ancora meno =

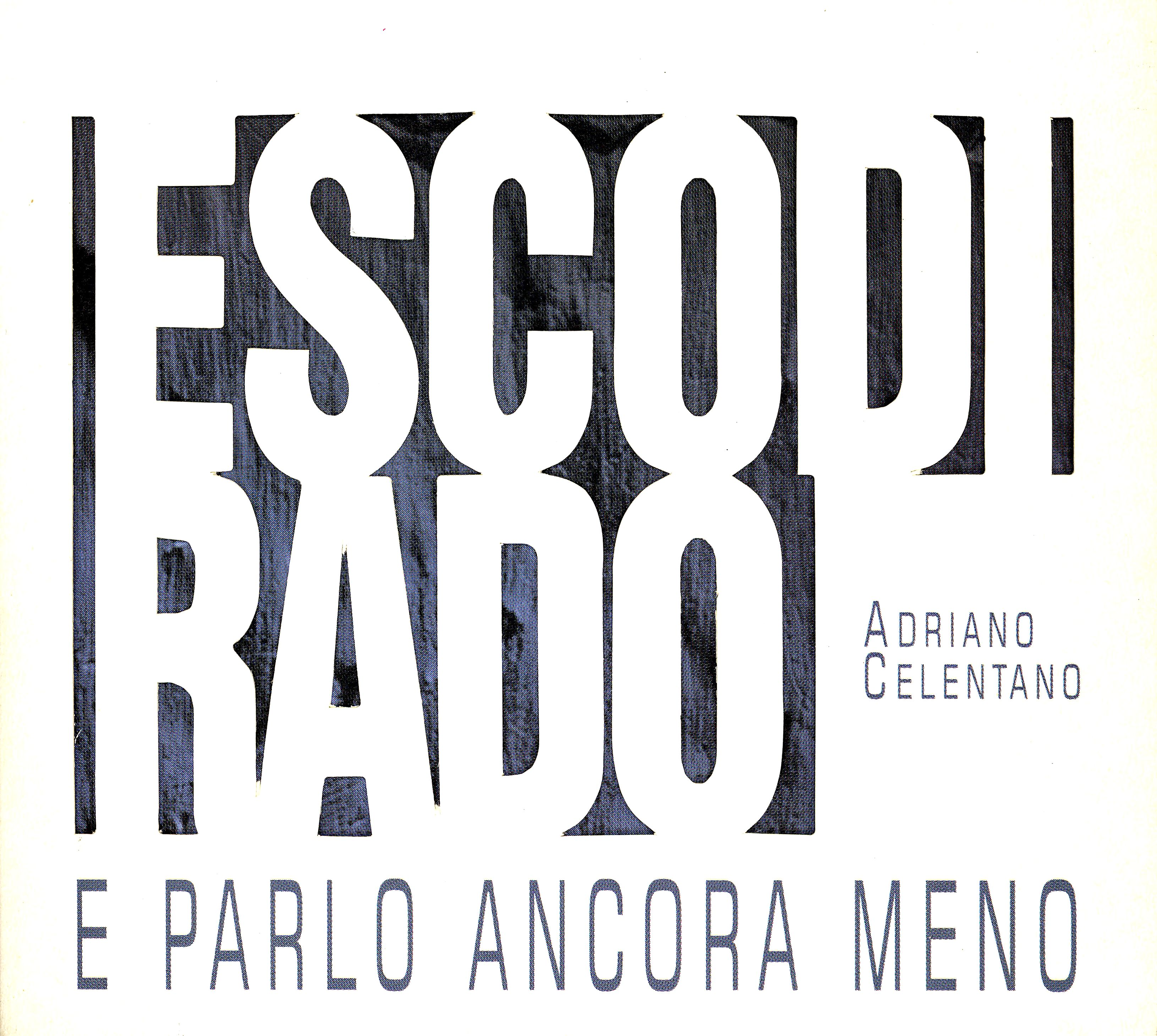

Studio album by Adriano Celentano
- Released: 10 November 2000
- Recorded: 2000, Air Studio, Galbiate (LC)
- Genre: Pop-rock
- Label: MSI Music Distribution
- Producer: Clan Celentano

Adriano Celentano chronology
Io non so parlar d'amore (1999)	Esco di rado e parlo ancora meno (2000)	Per sempre (2002)

Professional ratings
Review scores
Source	Rating
Rockol	mixed

Esco di rado e parlo ancora meno (English: I seldom go out and I speak even less) is the 40th studio album by famous Italian singer and actor Adriano Celentano, issued November 10, 2000, by label MSI Music Distribution.

== Track listing ==
No.	Title	Lyrics	Music	Length
1.	"Per averti"	Mogol	Gianni Bella	5:03
2.	"Apri il cuore"	Mogol, Cheope	Gianni and Rosario Bella	5:19
3.	"Lago rosso"	Mogol	Gianni Bella	5:18
4.	"Quello che non ti ho detto mai"	Mogol	Gianni Bella	4:35
5.	"Ti prenderò"	Mogol	Gianni Bella	4:55
6.	"Tir"	Mogol	Gianni and Rosario Bella	4:29
7.	"Se tu mi tenti"	Mogol	Gianni Bella	4:14
8.	"Africa"	Mogol	Gianni and Rosario Bella	4:36
9.	"Io sono un uomo libero"	Ivano Fossati	Ivano Fossati	5:46
10.	"Le stesse cose"	Carlo Mazzoni	Carlo Mazzoni	5:43
11.	"Il figlio del dolore" (Bonus)	Mauro Spina	Adriano Celentano	6:25
12.	"Index" (Bonus)	—	—	4:07

== Charts ==
=== Weekly charts ===
Chart (2000)	Peak position
Italian Albums (FIMI)	1
Swiss Albums (Schweizer Hitparade)	18

=== Year-end charts ===
Chart (2001)	Position
Swiss Albums (Schweizer Hitparade)	95

== See also ==
- List of best-selling albums in Italy
