= Ricky Gianco =

Italian singer-songwriter (born 1943)

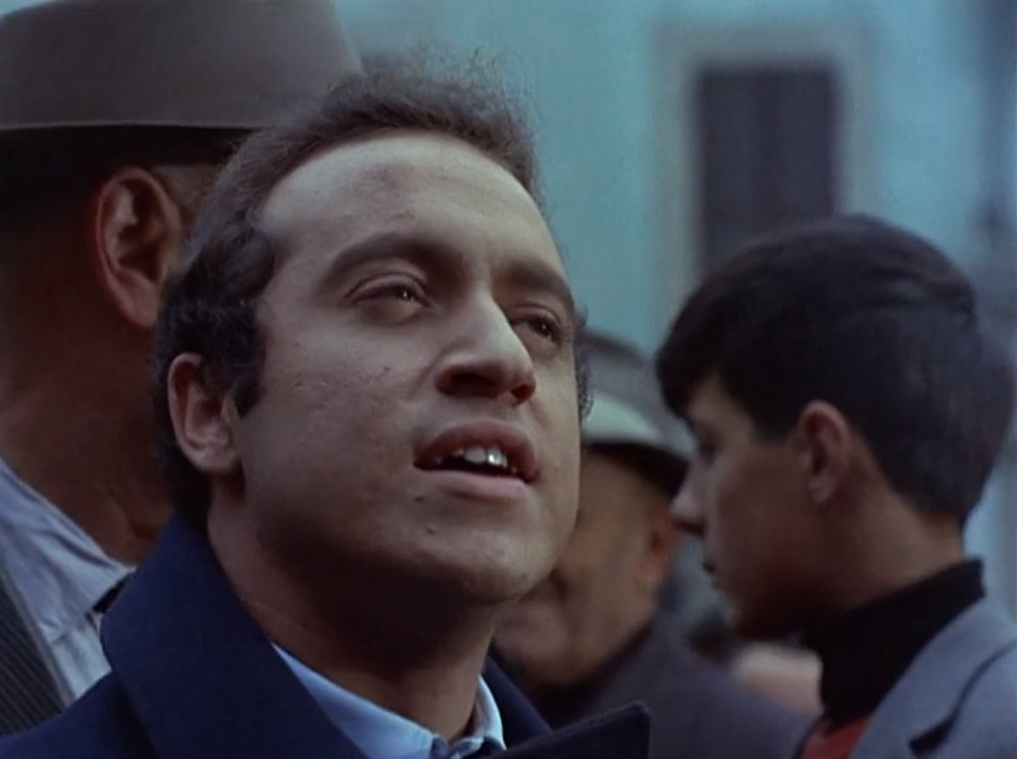
- Gianco in 1965
- Born: Riccardo Sanna; 18 February 1943 (age 83); Lodi, Lombardy, Kingdom of Italy
- Occupation: Singer-songwriter

Ricky Gianco (born Riccardo Sanna, 18 February 1943), formerly known as Ricky Sann, is an Italian singer, songwriter, guitarist and record producer, considered one of the founders of Italian rock music.

== Career ==
Born in Lodi, Gianco started playing guitar as a child, and at 11 years old he won a music contest for amateur musicians, soon gaining some popularity thanks to his participation to numerous Mike Bongiorno's shows. In 1958 he was guitarist of the band "Pepe, Pietruccio & Lallo", an early incarnation of Dik Dik. He first adopted the stage name Ricky Sann as a tribute to Ricky Nelson. He made his recording debut with the single "Ciao ti dirò", which is regarded by some critics as the first Italian original rock song. In 1960, he formed "Ricky Sanna e il suo complesso", a band with Enzo Jannacci and Luigi Tenco. His 1960 song "Dubbi" is considered an early example of comedy rock song.

In 1961, Gianco co-founded Clan Celentano, but after some disagreements with Adriano Celentano one year later he left the record label and moved to England, where he knew the Beatles (taking part in their 1963 Christmas Show at the Astoria Cinema in Finsbury Park) and collaborated with Ivor Raymonde. Returning to Italy, he reprised his singing career with the label Jaguar and started a fruitful collaboration as songwriter with Gian Pieretti, having his major success with "Pietre", a song launched by Gian Pieretti and Antoine at the Sanremo Music Festival 1967. In this period he also served as producer for I Ribelli and I Quelli, a rock band that was the nucleus of Premiata Forneria Marconi. In 1970, he took part in the 20th Sanremo Music Festival with his song "Accidenti" as a member of the supergroup Il Supergruppo. In 1972, he founded the label Intingo and two years later he co-founded the label L'Ultima Spiaggia.

Following the semi-retirement of Gian Pieretti, in the mid-1970s Gianco started a long professional association with Gianfranco Manfredi, in music and on stage. His production of the time became more ironical and more politically and socially committed. In 1989, he recorded one of his -better-known song, "Parigi con le gambe aperte", a duet with Gino Paoli, with whom he toured the same year. His 1991 album È rock & roll had among its guests Paoli, Jeff Porcaro, Steve Lukather, Pino Donaggio, James Burton, Enzo Jannacci and Giorgio Gaber. His 1992 and 2000 albums Piccolo è bello and Tandem also mainly consisted of duets and collaborations, notably Fabrizio De André, Franco Battiato, Robert Wyatt, and Ornella Vanoni.

As a songwriter, Gianco's collaborations include Mina, Adriano Celentano, Patty Pravo, Peppino di Capri, Equipe 84, and Don Backy. In 2003, he received a Premio Ciampi for his career. In 2025, he was awarded the Premio Tenco; the same year, he announced his retirement.

== Discography ==
=== Albums ===
- 1963: Una giornata con Ricky Gianco (Jaguar, JGR 73000)
- 1965: Ai miei amici di "Ciao amici" (Jaguar, JGR 74002)
- 1965: Ricky Gianco Show (Jaguar, JGR 74003)
- 1968: Ricky Gianco Special (Dischi Ricordi, MRP 9051)
- 1975: Braccio di Ferro (Intingo, ITGL 14005)
- 1976: Quel rissoso, irascibile, carissimo Braccio di Ferro (Intingo, ITGL 14007)
- 1976: Alla mia mam... (Ultima Spiaggia, ZLUS 55187)
- 1978: Arcimboldo (Ultima Spiaggia, ZPLS 34046)
- 1979: Liquirizia (soundtrack) (Fontana Records, 6323 811)
- 1982: Non si può smettere di fumare (Fonit-Cetra, LPX 100)
- 1989: Di nuca (New Enigma, NEM 47714)
- 1991: È Rock'n Roll (Fonit-Cetra, TLPX 277)
- 1992: Piccolo è bello (Fonit-Cetra)
- 1995: Il meglio di Ricky Gianco (compilation, D.V. MORE)
- 1997: Ricky Gianco: i successi (compilation, D.V. MORE)
- 2000: Tandem (Ricky Gianco & ...) (compilation of collaborations, CBS, COL 497529 1)
- 2005: Ricky Gianco Collection (compilation, EDEL)
- 2009: Di santa ragione, EDEL
- 2010: Come un bambino (On Sale Music, 64 OSM 084)
