= Detto Mariano =

Italian composer (1937–2020)

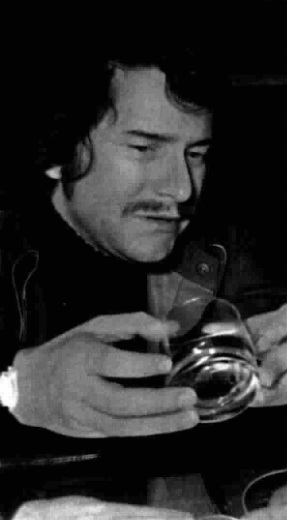
- Mariano in 1971

Background information
- Birth name: Mariano Detto
- Born: 27 July 1937; Monte Urano, Marche, Italy
- Died: 25 March 2020 (aged 82); Milan, Lombardy, Italy
- Occupation(s): Musical artist, composer
- Years active: 1958–2020
- Labels: Clan Celentano, Octopus Records

Detto Mariano (27 July 1937 – 25 March 2020) was an Italian composer, arranger, lyricist, pianist, record producer and music publisher.

== Life and career ==
Born Mariano Detto in Monte Urano, Mariano started his career in 1958 but was launched by entering Adriano Celentano's Clan Celentano, becoming keyboardist in his accompanying group "I Ribelli", sporadic lyricist and official arranger of all the songs of the Clan between 1962 and 1967. He also collaborated with Lucio Battisti, Mina, Milva, Equipe 84. Later he focused on composing numerous film soundtracks, especially comedy films.

== Death ==
On 25 March 2020, Mariano died of COVID-19 at the age of 82.
