= Prisencolinensinainciusol =

1972 single by Adriano Celentano

Single by Adriano Celentano

from the album Nostalrock
- Language: Gibberish (inspired by American English)
- B-side: "Disc Jockey"
- Released: 3 November 1972
- Genre: Rock and roll; experimental pop; funk; novelty song; avant-garde; proto-rap
- Length: 3:54
- Label: Clan (Italy); Epic (US)
- Songwriter: Adriano Celentano

Adriano Celentano singles chronology
| "La ballata di Pinocchio" (1972) | "Prisencolinensinainciusol" (1972) | "L'unica chance" (1973) |

Audio sample
- file; help

"Prisencolinensinainciusol" (pronounced [ˌprizeŋˌkɔliˌnɛnsinainˈtʃuːzol]; stylized on the single cover as "PRİSENCÓLİNENSİNÁİNCIÚSOL") is a song composed by the Italian singer Adriano Celentano, and performed by Celentano and his wife Claudia Mori. It was released as a single in 1972. Both the name of the song and its lyrics are gibberish, but are intended to represent what American English sounds like to people who do not understand English. The song charted in several European countries.

== Background ==
By the 1960s, Celentano was already one of the most popular rock musicians in Italy, in large part due to his appearance at the Sanremo Music Festival 1961 and the subsequent success of his song "24.000 baci". Martina Tanga writes that his artistic persona was characterised by "loud lyrics and inelegant body movements", which differentiated him from other singers of the time. Paolo Prato describes his style as "a bit of Elvis, a bit of Jerry Lewis, a bit of folk singer". "Prisencolinensinainciusol" was released in 1972 and remained popular throughout the 1970s.

== Song ==
=== Style ===
"Prisencolinensinainciusol" has been described as varying music genres including rock and roll, Europop, house music, disco, hip hop and funk. Celentano, however, did not have these styles in mind when writing the song. He composed "Prisencolinensinainciusol" by creating a loop of four drumbeats and improvising lyrics over the top of the loop in his recording studio. The song is characterised by an E flat groove in the drum and bass guitar and riff in the horn section. Between the drum loop, the looped horns, and the conversational improvisational "freestyle" flow of the lyrics and the chanting chorus, the song has many elements later found in hip hop in the mid-1980s and 1990s.

Celentano has claimed that with this song he invented rapping.

=== Lyrics and language ===
The song is intended to sound as if it is sung in English spoken with an American accent; however, the lyrics are deliberately unintelligible gibberish. Andrew Khan, writing in The Guardian, later described the sound as reminiscent of Bob Dylan's output from the 1980s.

Celentano's intention was not to create a humorous novelty song but to explore communication barriers. The intent was to demonstrate how English sounds to people who do not understand the language:

"Ever since I started singing, I was very influenced by American music and everything Americans did. So at a certain point, because I like American slang—which, for a singer, is much easier to sing than Italian—I thought that I would write a song which would only have as its theme the inability to communicate. And to do this, I had to write a song where the lyrics didn't mean anything."

Celentano also took inspiration from the Biblical account of the Tower of Babel.

== Releases and versions ==
The original version of the track was released as a single on 3 November 1972, and appeared on Celentano's album Nostalrock the following year. For its UK release, the single was given the simpler title of "The Language of Love (Prisencol…)". The song appeared on the 2008 dance compilation album Poplife Presents: Poplife Sucks. Celentano later recorded a version with real Italian lyrics; this version, released on his 1994 album Quel punto, was named "Il Seme del Rap" and served as a hip hop parody. In 2016, Celentano released a new recording of the song (with the original lyrics); this version featured the music of Benny Benassi and vocals from Mina.

Celentano performed the song at least twice on Italian television. In the fourth episode of the 1974 variety series Milleluci, he dances with Raffaella Carrà, who lip-syncs to Mori's vocals. In an episode of Formula Due, a TV show hosted by Loretta Goggi, the song appears in a comedy sketch in which he portrays a teacher. Video clips of both performances, both separate and edited together, began to appear on YouTube in the late 2000s. It became something of an Internet meme, and in 2009 it was posted to Boing Boing, and subsequently saw renewed interest in the Italian media. It was the subject of a 2012 All Things Considered (NPR) segment, for which Celentano was interviewed.

In 2017, Celentano's version appeared in Season 3, Episode 1 of the FX television series Fargo.

In 2018, the song was included in the soundtrack of "Lone Star", the second episode of the FX television series Trust. The song was incorporated into Rush Limbaugh's radio show as one of the revolving bumper music intros, where Limbaugh asserts learning about it from his memory of details that match the TV show.

In 2023, the song appeared in Season 3, Episode 3 of the Apple TV+ series Ted Lasso over a montage of football games involving the character Zava, AFC Richmond's newest player acquisition. In 2025, it was featured in the closing credits of Spike Lee's Highest 2 Lowest, in an English-language version performed by Aiyana-Lee. Also in 2025, the song was used in an advert for Birrificio Angelo Poretti as part of its advertising campaign, "Welcome to the Lake".

In 2026, "Prisencolinensinainciusol" was used in the EasyJet advert 'Big Orange Sale'. The song was also featured in the 2026 Winter Olympics opening ceremony, representing 1960s and 70s during a musical segment on the history of the Winter Olympic Games.

== Track listing ==
- 7" single – BF 70026
1. "Prisencolinensinainciusol" (Adriano Celentano) – 3:54
2. "Disc Jockey" (Luciano Beretta, Adriano Celentano, Miki Del Prete) – 4:54

== Charts ==
Weekly chart performance for "Prisencolinensinainciusol"
| Chart (1973–1974) | Peak position |
|---|---|
| Belgium (Ultratop 50 Flanders) | 4 |
| Belgium (Ultratop 50 Wallonia) | 2 |
| Italy (Musica e dischi) | 5 |
| Netherlands (Dutch Top 40) | 6 |
| Netherlands (Single Top 100) | 5 |
| West Germany (GfK) | 46 |

== Sales ==
Sales for Prisencolinensinainciusol
| Region | Sales |
|---|---|
| Italy | 260,000 |

== See also ==
- Grammelot
- Non-lexical vocables in music – Form of nonsense syllable used in a wide variety of music
- Nonsense verse
- Nonsense song
- "Salsa Tequila"
- "Chacarron Macarron"
- "Ging Gang Goolie"
- Pingu
