= Pacifico (singer) =

Italian singer-songwriter

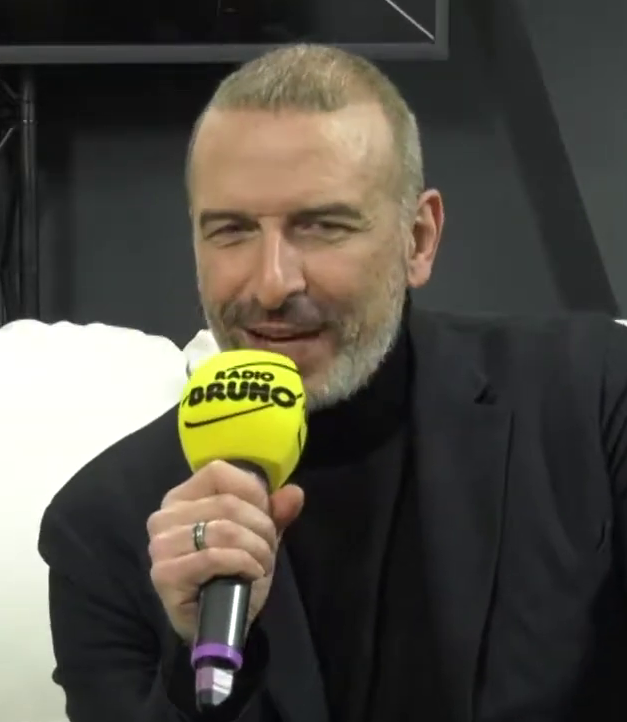
- Pacifico in 2018
- Born: Luigi De Crescenzo; 5 March 1964 (age 62); Milan, Italy
- Occupation: Singer-songwriter

Luigi "Gino" De Crescenzo (born 5 March 1964), best known as Pacifico, is an Italian singer-songwriter, composer and musician.

== Background ==
Born in Milan, the son of a Neapolitan father and mother from Salerno, at 16 years old De Crescenzo formed his first band, "La Goccia". After graduating in political science and various experiences through rock, jazz, and fusion, in 1989 he formed together with Luca Gemma "Rossomaltese", a group in whom De Crescenzo was composer and guitarist. After the group disbanded he collaborated with the director Roberta Torre, composing the score of the film South Side Story and the incidental music for the play Invece che all’una alle due.

In 2000 De Crescenzo adopted the stage name Pacifico, making his solo record debut in 2001 with a critically acclaimed album with the same name. In 2004 he entered the main competition at the Sanremo Music Festival, with the song "Solo un sogno". During the following years he alternated his activity as singer-songwriter (opening concerts for Kings of Convenience, Luca Carboni and Cousteau, among others) with the activity of composer, notably collaborating with Adriano Celentano, Andrea Bocelli, Gianna Nannini, Marco Mengoni, Antonello Venditti, Malika Ayane, Zucchero Fornaciari and Ornella Vanoni.

== Discography ==
- 2001 - Pacifico
- 2004 - Musica leggera
- 2006 - Dolci frutti tropicali
- 2009 - Dentro ogni casa
- 2012 - Una voce non basta
- 2013 - In cosa credi (EP)
