= Il ragazzo della via Gluck =

Single by Adriano Celentano
- A-side: Il ragazzo della via Gluck
- B-side: Chi era lui
- Released: 17 January 1966
- Genre: Pop, country
- Label: Clan Celentano
- Songwriters: Miki Del Prete; Adriano Celentano; Luciano Beretta

"Il ragazzo della via Gluck" ("The boy from Gluck Street") is an Italian pop song by Adriano Celentano, covered by artists from many other countries.

== Composition ==
The music of the song is by Adriano Celentano and the lyrics by Luciano Beretta and Miki Del Prete. It was released in 1966 as a double A-side single by Celentano, with "Chi era lui" on the flipside, composed by Paolo Conte with lyrics by Mogol and Miki Del Prete. Both tracks were arranged by Detto Mariano. The tracks' duration was 4:17 for "Il ragazzo della via Gluck" and 2:49 for "Chi era lui".

== History ==
The song originally appeared in March 1966 in Celentano's album La festa and in his follow-up album, Il ragazzo della via Gluck, released in November 1966.

The song debuted at the Sanremo Festival in 1966 where it achieved little success. It was eliminated from competition after the first night. But eventually it gained great favour with fans, making it the best-known and most representative of Celentano's songs, and contained many autobiographical references. Via Gluck was the street in Milan where Celentano lived as a boy with his family, and "eight years" ("...passano gli anni, ma 8 son lunghi..." meaning "...the years go by, but 8 they are long...") is a reference to the peak of Celentano's recording career, from 1958 to 1966.

Although the song tells a personal story about the loss of a childhood home, it is also a lament about the rapid urbanisation during the Post–World War II economic expansion in Europe and the loss of known environment and arable land ("...là dove c'era l'erba, ora c'è una città..." / "...perchè continuano a costruire le case, e non lasciano l'erba..."). Being a prominently discussed phenomenon at the time and a widely felt sentiment, this may have contributed to the song's large success and to its many cover versions and translations into other languages.

== Charts ==
=== Weekly charts ===
Chart (1966–67)	Peak position
Italy (Musica e dischi)	2

=== Year-end charts ===
Chart (1966)	Peak position
Italy (Musica e dischi)	10

== Italian covers ==
In the same year of its original release, Giorgio Gaber recorded a cover version, that was published twice as an attachment to the Italian music magazine Pop. The first time, in March 1966, as a single containing "Il ragazzo della via Gluck"/"Dio, come ti amo" ("God, I love you so"), and the second, in June 1966, containing "Il ragazzo della via Gluck"/"Una casa in cima al mondo" ("A house on top of the world"). Giorgio Gaber also released a response to the song named "La risposta al ragazzo della Via Gluck" ("The response to the boy from Gluck Street").

In 2004, Adriano Celentano recorded the track with new lyrics and released it as "Quel Casinha" ("That Little House") in his album C'è sempre un motivo (There's always a reason). The new text was sung in Creole with Cesária Évora.

In February 2013, the Italian group Almamegretta, together with James Senese, Marcello Coleman and Clementino, performed the song on the fourth evening of the 2013 Sanremo Music Festival.

== International covers ==
=== "Tar and Cement" ===
In 1966, the American singer Verdelle Smith sang an English version titled "Tar and Cement", with songwriting credit to Paul Vance, Lee Pockriss, Luciano Beretta, Michele Del Prete, and Adriano Celentano. It was her only hit. "Tar and Cement" made it to #2 in Australia, and in Canada, it reached #32. In the US, it peaked at #38. It was also #6 on "Keener 13" from Detroit radio station WKNR for the week ending Monday 27 June 1966. Smith's "Tar and Cement" was included in the 2004 compilation CD, Girls Go Zonk: US Dream Babes.
The song "Tar and Cement" was also recorded by Caroline Munro in England and Joe Dolan in Ireland.

==== Charts ====
===== Weekly charts =====
Chart (1966)	Peak position
Australia (Go-Set)	39
Australia (Kent Music Report)	2
Canada (RPM)	32
New Zealand (Listener)	14
South Africa (Springbok Radio)	15
Rhodesia (Lyons Maid)	3
UK (Record Retailer)	56
US (Billboard Hot 100)	38
US (Cash Box Top 100)	65
US (Record World 100 Top Pops)	61

===== Year-end charts =====
Chart (1966)	Peak position
Australia (Kent Music Report)	24

=== "La maison où j'ai grandi" ===
Cover of the single released in France, June 1966

It became a favourite song in France when covered by Françoise Hardy, with French lyrics by Eddy Marnay, under the title "La maison où j'ai grandi". It appeared on her album known as La maison où j'ai grandi. The album was released without a title and is identified chiefly by the song it carries, its major hit. Hardy had admired Celentano's autobiographical song "Il ragazzo della via Gluck" having seen him perform it at the Sanremo in January 1966. The lyrics are not related to the original song.
Looking back at the song in 2004, she said she felt an emotion of sadness at the time she heard the song for her mother, an assistant accountant, who had raised Françoise and her younger sister alone.

=== "The Story of a Country Boy" ===
Belgian band The Cousins covered the song in English as "Story of a Country Boy" on the B-side of their 1966 single "You Will Find Another Baby". The song was the lead track on the 1966 French EP "The new sound of The Cousins", a compilation of both their 1966 singles. It was the final release by the original band, which parted ways a few months after its release.

=== "Lyckliga gatan" ===
The song enjoyed very similar popularity in Sweden, when the singer Anna-Lena Löfgren sang it with Swedish language lyrics as "Lyckliga gatan". The song's Swedish lyrics were written by Britt Lindeborg, who based the content on the contemporary gentrification of the Stockholm suburb Hagalund, where she had been raised as a child. It was released in 1967 and was certified gold in Sweden and platinum and diamond in Norway. It used the melody of the Italian song, with completely different lyrics that nonetheless convey the message and moral of the song.

By February 1968, "Lyckliga gatan" had sold 140,000 copies in Sweden, and 100,000 copies in Norway.

==== Charts ====
===== Weekly charts =====
Chart (1967–1968)	Peak position
Finland (Mitä Suomi soittaa)	14
Norway (VG-lista)	1
Sweden (Kvällstoppen)	1
Sweden (Svensktoppen)	1

===== Year-end charts =====
Chart (1968)	Peak position
Sweden (Svensktoppen)	2

=== "Immer am Sonntag" ===
Anna-Lena Löfgren built on her success in Sweden and Norway by recording a German-language version of the song, as "Immer am Sonntag" becoming very successful in Germany, releasing tens of other German language songs.

=== "Lykkelige gate" ===
A Norwegian version released in 1968 on a single (Triola records) sung by Margrethe Toresen. The Swedish version is still vastly more popular in Norway.

=== "Der Junge aus der Via Gluck" ===
Another German-language version was recorded in March 1966 by the Luxembourgish television-star and radio-presenter (for Radio Luxembourg) Camillo Felgen.

=== "Závidím" = I Envy ===
Czech version of this song, which lyrics was written by Jiří Grossmann, who was dying of cancer, was performed by Naďa Urbánková.

=== "Asfalttia ja sementtiä" ===
A Finnish version of the song was sung by Kari Kuuva in 1968

=== "Het huis dat tussen rozen stond" ===
Belgian singer Sanne recorded in 1993 a version in Dutch, with lyrics by Erik Van Neygen and Marc Van Caelenberg.

=== "La casa donde yo crecí" ===
In 1999, the Argentinian girlband Seducidas y abandonadas covered the track in Spanish as "La casa donde yo crecí". It appears on their second album, Las 4 en punto.
