= Gino Santercole =

Italian musical artist and actor (1940–2018)

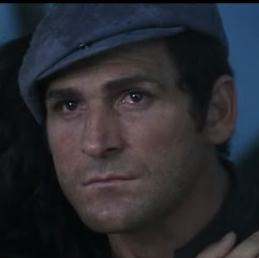
- Santercole in the movie Yuppi du (1975)

Background information
- Born: Gino Santercole; 21 November 1940; Milan, Kingdom of Italy
- Died: 8 June 2018 (aged 77) Rome, Italy
- Genres: Rock; pop; art rock; soundtrack music; protest music; folk rock
- Occupations: Musician; singer-songwriter; producer; actor
- Instruments: Vocals; guitar; synthesizer; keyboards; piano
- Years active: 1960–2018
- Label: Clan Celentano
- Formerly of: I Ribelli

Gino Santercole (21 November 1940 – 8 June 2018) was an Italian singer-songwriter, guitarist, and actor. He was well known for his breakthrough hit "Questo vecchio pazzo mondo" ("This old crazy world"), a cover of P. F. Sloan's "Eve of Destruction", and for the song "Ma che freddo stasera (Such a Cold Night Tonight)" that he sang in the movie Yuppi du (1975).

== Life ==
=== Early life ===
Santercole was born in Milan, Italy, on 21 November 1940. His family is originally from the south eastern region of Apulia. Santercole's mother, Rosa, was the sister of the singer-songwriter, comedian, and movie director Adriano Celentano.

Santercole lost his father as a child. He spent some years in college, and was then forced to go to work by himself. He was fond of rock n' roll, and in his free time he learned to play the guitar.

Celentano recruited Santercole for his group, the Rock Boys, when his second guitarist, Ico Cerutti, left the group. Santercole became a Rock Boy just in time to participate in the First Italian Festival of Rock and Roll, held on 18 May 1957 at the Via Piranesi Ice Palace in Milan. Record producer Walter Guertler was in the festival audience, and signed the Rock Boys to a recording contract right after the show.

=== The Rebels and the solo debut ===
The Rock Boys evolved into the Rebels, who backed up Celentano and other singers such as Ricky Clem Sacco and Gianco. Celentano began a solo career and soon Santercole became the group's lead guitarist.

Santercole began singing as well; the first song he sang on was "Sono un fallito" ("I am a failure"), a cover of Ray Charles's "Busted". That was followed by his own solo single, "Silver Star", in December 1964, which got good airplay and chart success in early 1965. In 1965 he released a solo EP, credited to Santercole with Celentano and Don Backy.

Then in 1966 Santercole sang on and released the single "Questo vecchio pazzo mondo" ("This old crazy world"). The song is a cover of the folk-rock/protest song written by P. F. Sloan, "Eve of Destruction", which became a hit when covered by Barry McGuire in 1966. Santercole performs the song in Cantagiro in 1967. Celentano used the same music tracks and lyrics in 1984 on his album I miei americani (My American), a collection of U.S. hits translated into Italian, and again in the first episode of his 1999 television show, Francamente me ne infischio (Frankly I don't care) in 1999.

In 1966, Santercole participated in Festival di Sanremo with his uncle, Ico Cerutti and Pilade, performing "Il ragazzo della via Gluck" ("The boy from Gluck Street") under the name Trio of Clan; however, they are eliminated in the early evening.

Meanwhile, the kinship with Celentano is strengthened. Celentano separated from his Milena Cantù and married actress and singer Claudia Mori, while Santercole fell in love with and married Mori's sister, Anna Moroni (becoming the brother-in-law of his uncle). Anna Santercole will bear him two sons.

=== Composer and actor ===
Santercole has written many famous and significant songs of Italian music, including some of great success. His first success was "Una carezza in un pugno" ("A caress into a fist"), initially recorded by Celantano as a B-side in 1968. The song has become an evergreen of Italian pop music is, having been used several times by Celentano in his television programs. In 1992 the singer and Fiorello imitator included a new cover of "Una carezza in un pugno" on his album Nuovamente falso.

"Una carezza in un pugno" was the first song Santercole wrote. He had never tried to write a song, because he did not believe he could. One day, though, when learning a new song – Bert Kaempfert's "Strangers in the Night"—on guitar, he found himself varying notes and finally playing a completely different song, the one that became "Una carezza in un pugno".

Other hits followed: "Svalutation", a rock song with electric guitar, on his 1976 album (which also contained his songs "The Boat" and "Room 21"), "A boy on the Lion", and "Remarkably" (written initially for Mina, with lyrics by Luciano Beretta).

Santercole also composed music for movies. He is credited with the soundtracks of Segni particolari: bellissimo (1983) and Joan Lui - Ma un giorno nel paese arrivo io di lunedì (1985). In addition he did numerous work on the music of Celentano's films; a highlight being his hit "Ma che freddo stasera (Such a Cold Night Tonight)" (which Santercole sang in English), from the movie Yuppi du (1975).

In 1969, Santercole also began an acting career. While he had previously played cameos and parts, his first substantial role came in the 1969 film Serafino. One day he visited Celentano, who had landed a role in the movie, on set; the director, Paolo Germi, saw him, thought he had a good face, and cast him as the Sergeant.

As an actor, Santercole has worked with directors such as Pietro Germi, Dino Risi, Giuliano Montaldo, Luigi Comencini, Luciano Salce, and Mario Monicelli. He has cast credits in four movies: Mani di velluto (1979), Yuppi du (1975), Il commissario Pepe (1969), and Serafino (1969).

=== Return to television and reconciliation with Celentano ===
In 1999 Santercole collaborated on the new album by Pio Trebbi, lead singer of the Clan Celentano, who was experiencing economic difficulties; they wrote the song "L'ultimo del clan". To help, Santercole contacted Celentano, who decided to join the two in an episode of his television program Francamente me ne infischio. The symbol of peace between the two after that in the past there had been some disagreements.

On 22 January 2007 Santercole agreed to participate with Varese at a celebration of the 50th anniversary of rock 'n' roll in Italy, along with Pennant, the Rebels, Rosie, Ghigo Agosti, and others. In September 2008 Santercole was a guest at the Festival in Venice with Adriano Celentano for the new release of Yuppi du. 2009 in June he hosted the programme of Rai Two Stracult Show of Marco Giusti German in a sketch comedian with Stefano Sarcinelli and Nicola Vicidomini.

On 13 April 2010 Santercole released a new album, titled Nessuno è solo, on which he had composed all of the music (Mimmo Politanò wrote the lyrics).

== Discography ==
=== With the Rebels ===
45s

- 1960 Rebels in blues/blue shirt (Italdisc IR-69)
- 1961 Henry VIII/200 per hour (Boško Peraica QB 8031)
- 1962 La cavalcata/Serenata a Valle Chiara (Clan Celentano, ACC 24002)
- 1963 at nine o'clock in the bar/Danny boy (Clan Celentano/I Rebels, R 6000; the b-side is credited to Christmas Befanino and the Raebels)
- 1964 who is la ragazza del Clan?/quella donna (Clan Celentano/I Rebels, R 6002)

LPs

- 1968 I Ribelli (Dischi Ricordi, SMRP 9052)
- 1988 I Ribelli live (CGD, LSM 1315)

CDs

- 2002: I ribelli (Sony/BMG 191192)
- 2010: Cantano Adriano (Indie Europe/Zoom 7794766)

=== Solo ===
45s

- 1964: attached to ceiling/If you want (Clan Celentano, ACC 24017)
- 1964: Silver Star/without shoes (Clan Celentano, ACC 24020)
- 1965: Oh Rose ' Rosetta/ladies and gentlemen (Clan Celentano, ACC 24025)
- 1966: this old crazy world/our time (Clan Celentano, ACC 24042)
- 1967: the fight of love/soul (Clan Celentano, ACC 24056)
- 1968: Jane and John/how beautiful the day (Clan Celentano, ACC 24076)
- 1969: Poor Gino/Barbara (Clan Celentano, BF 69024)
- 1970: the King of fantasy/how sad night (Clan Celentano, BF 69045)
- 1975: Such a cold night tonight/the ballad (Clan Celentano, CLN 3040)
- 1978: Giovanna/Uacci-du amor (Valiant, ZBV 7087)
- 1980: Change for change, no!/Ancora us (MONLupus 4909; with Blue Valente)
- 1981: Adriano t set fire/the love (Cherry White CB-85; with Blue Valente)
- 1982: Love is blue/Cavomba (DailyMusic, DLM-31014 Blue)
- 2010: nobody is only (Sony)

EPs

- 1965: Hi guys/who have it with me/I'm a failure/I want to sleep (Hi! Boys, ACC-SP-25002; with Adriano Celentano and Don Backy; Santercole sings "Sono un fallito")

CDs

- 2000: Gino Santercole (D'azur 1525, TBP series Yesterdays; re-recording with new arrangements of the biggest hits)
- 2005: Il Meglio (DV More, UPC 8014406624564)
- 2010: Nessuno è solo (Sony Music)

Soundtracks

- 1983: Segni particolari: bellissimo (CGD Records 20406, Cetra LPX 119)
- 1985: Joan Lui - Ma un giorno nel paese arrivo io di lunedì.

== Filmography ==
- 1960: San Remo, la grande sfida (San Remo, the Great Challenge) (dir. Piero Vivarelli) - himself
- 1961: Io bacio... tu baci (I Kiss ... You Kiss) (dir. Piero Vivarelli)
- 1963: Uno strano tipo (A Strange Kind) (dir. Lucio Fulci) - himself
- 1964: Cleopazza (dir. Carlo Moscovini)
- 1964: Super rapina a Milano (Super Heist in Milan) (dir. Adriano Celentano and Piero Vivarelli) - Gino
- 1968: Rose rosse per il führer (Code Name: Red Roses) (dir. Fernando di Leo) - British parachutist
- 1968: Serafino (Seraphim) (dir. Pietro Germi) - Sergeant
- 1969: Il commisario Pepe (Police Chief Pepe) (dir. Ettore Scolo) - Oreste
- 1969: Infanzia, vocazione e prime esperienze di Giacomo Casanova, veneziano (Childhood, vocation and early experiences of Giacomo Casanova, Venetian) (dir. Luigi Comencini) - Baffo
- 1969: Il giovane normale (The Normal Young Man) (dir. Dino Risi) - Giorgio
- 1971: Er più – Storia d'amore e di coltello (Er more: Story of love and a Knife) (dir. Sergio Corbucci) - Verdicchio
- 1972: Il sindacalista (The Union) (dir. Luciano Salce) - Operaio
- 1973: The Assassination of Matteotti (dir. Florestano Vancini) - Fascist
- 1973: Li chiamavano i tre moschettieri... invece erano quattro (They Were Called Three Musketeers ... But They Were Four) (dir. Silvio Amadio) - Athos
- 1974: I figli di nessuno (Nobody's Children) (dir. Bruno Gaburro)
- 1974: Sesso in testa (Sex Head) (dir. Sergio Ammirata [and Fernando de Leo]) - Diana's boyfriend
- 1974: Milano odia: la polizia non può sparare (Almost Human) (dir. Umberto Lenzi) - Vittorio
- 1975: Yuppi du (dir. Adriano Celentano [and Miky del Prety]) - Napoleone
- 1975: Amore vuol dir gelosia (Love is the Meaning of Jealousy) (dir. Mauro Severino) - Amos
- 1975: Labbra di lurido blu (Lips of Lurid Blue) (dir. Alberto) - Alberto
- 1976: L'Agnese va a morire (And Agnes Chose to Die) (dir. Giuliano Montaldo) - Piròn
- 1978: Un amore così fragile, così violento (A Love So Fragile, So Violent (dir. Leros Pittoni) - Russo
- 1978: Geppo il folle (Geppo the Crazy) (dir. Adriano Celentano) - First journalist
- 1978: Viaggio con Anita (Travels with Anita) (dir. Mario Monicelli) - Camionista
- 1979: Mani di velluto (Velvet Hands) (dir. Franco Castellano and Giuseppe Moccia) - Leo di Giordano
- 1979: Switch (dir. Giuseppe Collizi) - Annibale
- 1979: Super Andy, il fratello brutto di Superman (Super Andy, Superman's Bad Brother) (dir. Paolo Banchini) - Superkid
- 1979: Profumo e balocchi (Perfume and Toys) (dir. Angelo Jacono) - Monica Father
- 1980: Sono fotogenico (I'm Photogenic) (dir. Dino Risi) - Sergio
- 1982: Marco Polo (TV mini-series, dir. Giuliano Montaldo) - Giuseppe
- 1987: Fantastico 8 (TV Mini-Series, dir. Luigi Bonori) - himself
- 1988: Rally (TV Series, dir. Sergio Martino)
- 2004: Diritto di Difesa (Right of Defense) (TV Series, dir. Gianfrancesco Lazotti and Donatella Maiorca)
- 2010: De Sancta Quiete - (final film role)

Except where noted, film information courtesy of Internet Movie Database..
