= Adriano Celentano =

Italian musician and actor (born 1938)

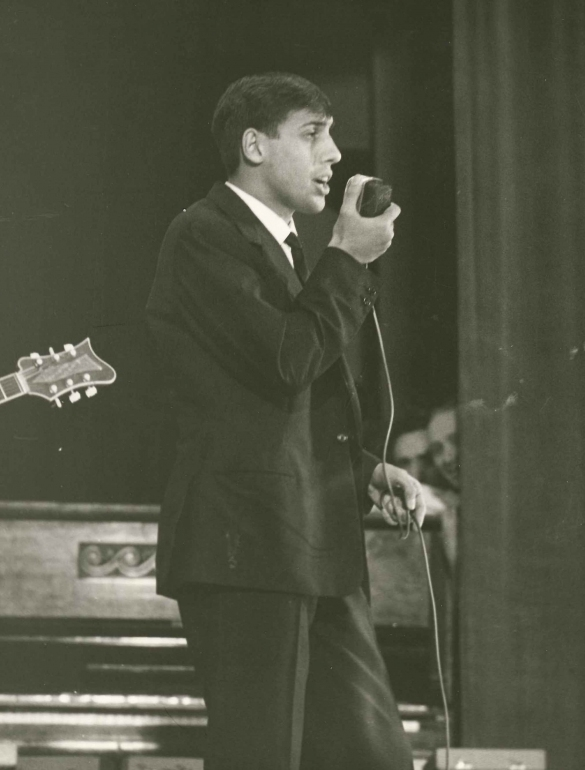
- Celentano in 1961
- Born: 6 January 1938 (age 88); Greco, Milan, Kingdom of Italy
- Occupations: Singer-songwriter; actor; film director; screenwriter; producer; television presenter
- Years active: 1957–present
- Spouse: Claudia Mori (m. 1964)
- Children: 3, including Rosalinda Celentano
- Musical career
- Genres: Pop; disco; rock and roll
- Instruments: Vocals; guitar; piano; drums
- Labels: Jolly; Clan Celentano
- Website: ilmondodiadriano.it

Adriano Celentano (Italian: [adriˈaːno tʃelenˈtaːno]; born 6 January 1938) is an Italian singer-songwriter, actor, showman, and filmmaker. He is dubbed Il Molleggiato ('the springy one') because of his energetic dancing.

Celentano's many albums frequently enjoyed both commercial and critical success. With around 150 million records sold worldwide, he is one of the best-selling Italian musical artists. Often credited as the author of both the music and lyrics of his songs, according to his wife Claudia Mori, some were written in collaboration with others. Due to his prolific career, both in Italy and abroad, he is considered one of the pillars of Italian music.

Celentano is recognized for being particularly perceptive of changes in the music business and is credited for having introduced rock and roll to Italy. As an actor, Celentano has appeared in 39 films, mostly comedies.

== Early life ==
Celentano was born on 6 January 1938 in Greco, Milan, Italy, at 14 Via Cristoforo Gluck, a street close to the Central Station and this address later became the subject of the famous song "Il ragazzo della via Gluck" ('The boy from Gluck Street'). His parents, Leontino Celentano and Giuditta Giuva, were from Foggia, Apulia, and had moved north for work. His career as a singer started in 1959. Before his debut as an artist, he was working as a watchmaker.

== Career ==
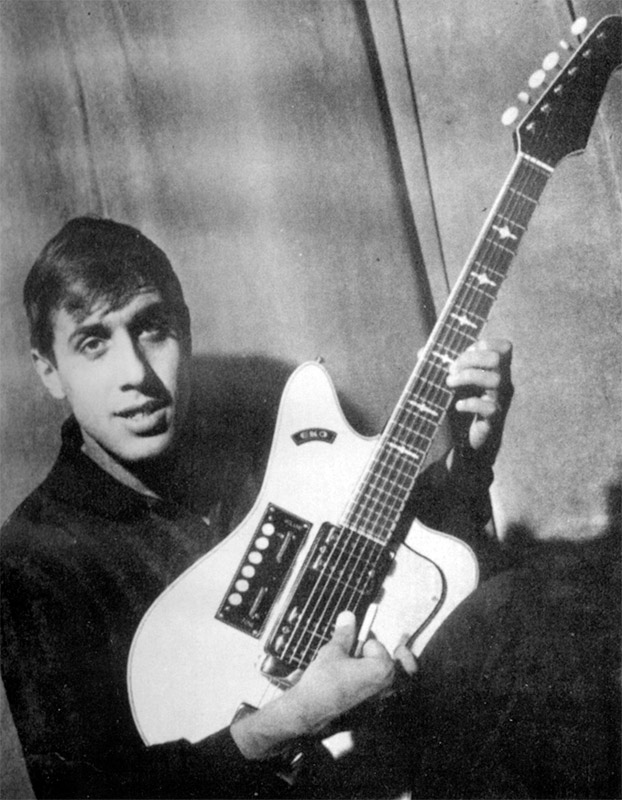
Celentano with an Eko Guitar

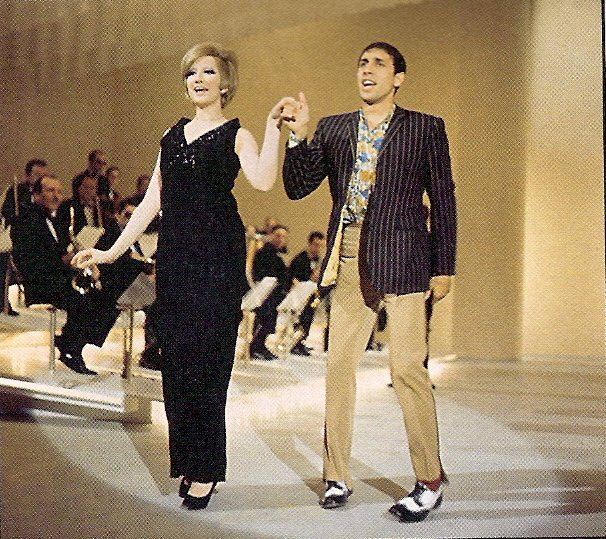
Celentano with Mina in 1967

Heavily influenced by Elvis Presley and the 1950s rock 'n' roll scene as well as by American actor Jerry Lewis, Celentano started playing in a rock and roll band with Giorgio Gaber and Enzo Jannacci. Along with Gaber and Jannacci, he was discovered by Jolly Records A&R Executive Ezio Leoni, who signed him to his first recording contract and co-authored with Celentano some of his greatest early hits, including "24.000 baci", "Il tuo bacio è come un rock", and "Si è spento il Sole". He first appeared on screen in Ragazzi del Juke-Box, a 1959 Italian musical film directed by Lucio Fulci with music by Ezio Leoni. In 1960, Federico Fellini cast him as a rock and roll singer in his film La dolce vita (1960).

In 1962, Celentano founded the Italian record label Clan Celentano (which is still active) with many performers such as Don Backy, Ola & the Janglers, Ricky Gianco, Katty Line, Gino Santercole, Fred Bongusto and his wife Claudia Mori.

As a film director, Celentano frequently cast Ornella Muti, Eleonora Giorgi and his wife Claudia Mori. He and Mori have three children, Rosita, Giacomo and Rosalinda Celentano. Rosalinda is most notable to worldwide audiences for playing Satan in Mel Gibson's The Passion of the Christ. Celentano has also hosted several Italian television shows.

Celentano has retained his popularity in Italy for over 50 years, selling millions of records and appearing in numerous TV shows and movies. As part of his TV and movie work, he created a comic genre, with a characteristic walk and facial expressions. For the most part, his films were commercially successful; indeed, in the 1970s and part of the 1980s, his low-budget movies were top of Italian box office rankings. As an actor, critics point to Serafino (1968), directed by Pietro Germi, as his best performance.

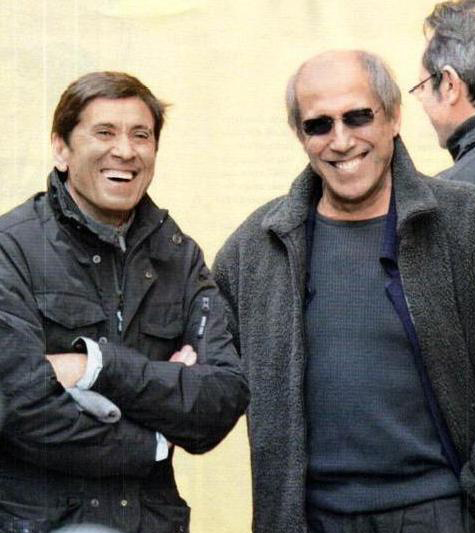
Celentano (right) in 2012 with Gianni Morandi

He has released 40 albums, consisting of 29 studio albums, three live albums, and eight compilations. Among his most popular songs there are "La coppia più bella del mondo", which sold over one million copies, and was awarded a gold disc; "Azzurro" (1968), written by Paolo Conte, "Svalutation" (1976), and "Prisencolinensinainciusol" (1972), which was written to mimic the way English sounds to non-English speakers despite being almost entirely gibberish.

Celentano was referenced in the 1979 Ian Dury and the Blockheads song and single, "Reasons to Be Cheerful, Part 3", as one of the aforementioned "reasons to be cheerful", and in Fellini's 1986 film Ginger and Fred.

After 18 years without live performances, Celentano's 2012 live concert was broadcast on Mediaset channel Canale 5, attracting over 9 million viewers.

== Personal life ==
Celentano has been a vegetarian since 2005 and has defended animal rights. A football fan, Celentano is a well-known Inter Milan supporter. In 2009, Celentano told La Repubblica that for years he wanted to learn English but never found time to do so, and said it is a "real pain" not being able to speak the language.

When the Barilla pasta company introduced a corkscrew pasta in the 1970s, it was named cellentani for Celentano. As Barilla trademarked the name, other companies call the shape cavatappi.

== Discography ==
Studio albums

- Adriano Celentano con Giulio Libano e la sua orchestra (1960)
- Furore (1960)
- Peppermint twist (1962)
- A New Orleans (1963)
- Non mi dir (1964)
- Il ragazzo della via Gluck (1966)
- Azzurro / Una carezza in un pugno (1968)
- Adriano rock (1968)
- Il forestiero (1970)
- Er Più – Storia d'amore e di coltello (1971)
- I mali del secolo (1972)
- Nostalrock (1973)
- Yuppi du (1975)
- Svalutation (1976)
- Disco dance (1977)
- Tecadisk (1977)
- Ti avrò (1978)
- Geppo il folle (1978)
- Soli (1979)
- Un po' artista un po' no (1980)
- Deus (1981)
- Uh... uh... (1982)
- Atmosfera (1983)
- I miei americani... (1984)
- Joan Lui (1985)
- I miei americani... 2 (1986)
- La pubblica ottusità (1987)
- Il re degli ignoranti (1991)
- Quel punto (1994)
- Arrivano gli uomini (1996)
- Mina Celentano (with Mina) (1998)
- Io non so parlar d'amore (1999)
- Esco di rado e parlo ancora meno (2000)
- Per sempre (2002)
- C'è sempre un motivo (2004)
- C'è sempre un motivo + L'Indiano (2005)
- Dormi amore, la situazione non è buona (2007)
- Facciamo finta che sia vero (2011)
- Le migliori (with Mina) (2016)
- Adrian (2019)

== Filmography ==
Title	Year	Role(s)	Director	Notes
Don't Knock the Rock	1956	Himself	Fred F. Sears	Uncredited
Ragazzi del Juke-Box	1959	Adriano	Lucio Fulci	
Go, Johnny, Go!	1959	Himself	Paul Landres	Cameo
Juke Box: Urli d'amore	1959	Singer	Mauro Morassi	Cameo
Urlatori alla sbarra	1960	Adriano / Il Molleggiato	Lucio Fulci	
La Dolce Vita	1960	Rock 'n Roll Singer	Federico Fellini	Cameo
Sanremo: La grande sfida	1960	Himself	Piero Vivarelli	Cameo
Hey, Let's Twist!	1961	Singer	Greg Garrison	Uncredited
Io bacio… tu baci	1961	Himself	Piero Vivarelli	Cameo
The Monk of Monza	1963	Fake Friar	Sergio Corbucci	
Uno strano tipo	1963	Peppino / Himself	Lucio Fulci	
Super rapina a Milano	1964	Sergio	Adriano Celentano	Directional debut
I malamondo	1964	Himself	Paolo Cavara	Documentary
Per un pugno di canzoni	1966	Singer	José Luis Merino	Cameo
Serafino	1968	Serafino Fiorin	Pietro Germi	
The Most Beautiful Couple in the World	1968	Himself	Camillo Mastrocinque	Cameo
Er Più – Storia d'amore e di coltello	1971	Nino "Er Più" Patroni	Sergio Corbucci	
White Sister	1972	Annibale Pezzi	Alberto Lattuada	
The Five Days	1973	Meo Cainazzo	Dario Argento	
Little Funny Guy	1973	Peppino Cavallo	Pasquale Campanile	
Rugantino	1973	Rugantino	Pasquale Campanile	
Yuppi du	1975	Felice Della Pietà	Adriano Celentano	Also director, writer and composer
What's Your Sign?	1975	Alfredo Astarita	Sergio Corbucci	Segment: "Aria"
The Con Artists	1976	Felice Brianza	Sergio Corbucci	
Lunatics and Lovers	1976	Sprint Boss	Flavio Mogherini	
L'altra metà del cielo	1977	Father Vincenzo Ferrari	Franco Rossi	
Ecco noi per esempio	1977	Antonmatteo Colombo	Sergio Corbucci	
Loggerheads	1978	Herman / Gustav	Castellano & Pipolo	
Geppo il folle	1978	Geppo	Adriano Celentano	Also director, writer, producer and composer
Velvet Hands	1979	Guido Quiller	Castellano & Pipolo	
Saturday, Sunday and Friday	1979	Mr. Costantin	Castellano & Pipolo	Segment: "Friday"
La locandiera	1980	Knight of Ripafretta	Paolo Cavara	
The Taming of the Scoundrel	1980	Elia Codogno	Castellano & Pipolo	
Qua la mano	1980	Father Fulgenzio	Pasquale Campanile	
Asso	1981	Asso	Castellano & Pipolo	
Madly in Love	1981	Barnaba Cecchini	Castellano & Pipolo	
Grand Hotel Excelsior	1982	Taddeus	Castellano & Pipolo	
Bingo Bongo	1982	Bingo Bongo	Pasquale Campanile	
Sing Sing	1983	Alfredo Borghi	Sergio Corbucci	
Segni particolari: bellissimo	1983	Mattia	Castellano & Pipolo	
Lui è peggio di me	1985	Leonardo	Enrico Oldoini	
Joan Lui	1985	Joan Lui	Adriano Celentano	Also director, writer and composer
Il burbero	1986	Tito Torrisi	Castellano & Pipolo	
Jackpot	1992	Furio	Mario Orfini	

== See also ==
- List of best-selling music artists
