= Miki Del Prete =

Italian lyricist and record producer

- Born: 23 July 1935 (age 89); Bari, Italy
- Occupations: Lyricist; record producer
- Spouse: Liana Massaro (m. 1965)

Michele "Miki" Del Prete (born 23 July 1935) is an Italian lyricist and record producer.

Born in Bari, at young age he moved to Milan with his family, following the transfer of his father, a footballer, from A.S. Bari to Calcio Como. In the 1950s Del Prete started his career as a professional dancer. In 1959, he became a close friend and a collaborator of Adriano Celentano. During his tenure with Celentano, Del Prete worked as a lyricist, manager, producer and advisor. Among the most successful songs he wrote with Celentano are "Impazzivo per te", "Il ragazzo della via Gluck", "La coppia più bella del mondo", "Una carezza in un pugno", "Prisencolinensinainciusol" and "Soli". He also wrote songs for other artists, including Caterina Caselli's hit "Nessuno mi può giudicare".
