= Luciano Beretta =

Italian lyricist

- Born: 1 January 1928; Milan, Italy
- Died: 11 January 1994 (aged 66); Caprino Veronese, Italy
- Occupation: Lyricist

Luciano Beretta (1 January 1928 – 11 January 1994) was an Italian lyricist, best known for his long collaboration with Adriano Celentano.

== Life and career ==
Born in Milan, Beretta was the son of a driver and a tailor, and had a degree in accounting. In the second half of the 1950s, after experiences as an actor, a dancer, a choreographer, and a production designer, he started her prolific career as a lyricist; hit songs he penned include Caterina Caselli's "Nessuno mi può giudicare", Milva's "Monica delle bambole", Orietta Berti's "Tu sei quello", Fausto Leali's "Un'ora fa", Domenico Modugno's "Questa è la mia vita".

He was for over 20 years a close collaborator of Adriano Celentano, penning some of his best known songs, including "Il ragazzo della via Gluck", "Chi non lavora non fa l'amore", "La coppia più bella del mondo ", "Mondo in mi 7a", "Una carezza in un pugno", "Si è spento il sole"; his collaborations also include Mina, Gianni Morandi, Ornella Vanoni, Gino Paoli, Patty Pravo, Claudio Villa, Renato Rascel, Gene Pitney, Nicola Di Bari, Mino Reitano, Iva Zanicchi, I Camaleonti.

Beretta died of a heart attack on 11 January 1994 at the Caprino Veronese hospital, where he was about to undergo surgery.
