= Clan Celentano =

- Founded: March 1962
- Founder: Adriano Celentano
- Genre: Various
- Country of origin: Italy

Clan Celentano is an Italian record label founded by Adriano Celentano in the early 1960s. Artists who have recorded for the label include Don Backy, Fred Bongusto, Milena Cantù, Adriano Celentano, Maria Luigia Brett Marvin and the Thunderbolts, Ola & the Janglers, Valeria Rigano, Anthony Swete and Johnny Tame.

== Background ==
In 1962, Adriano Celentano left SAAR and formed the Clan Celentano record label. Founded in March that year, the label set about finding new artists. The first releases were Italian the version of the Gene McDaniels' song, "Tower of Strength" ("Stai Lontana Da Me") and "Sei Rimasta Sola". Both records were Top 20 chart successes.

The label originally rejected a singer called Agaton. They weren't interested in his recorded music either. But, Milena Cantù who was Adriano Celentano's current girlfriend wanted to hear the recordings again. As a result, they signed him up and gave him a new stage name of Don Backy. He would later have issues with the label which would lead to court action.

The label facilitated the disc debut for film actress Claudia Mori with "Quello Che Ti Dico" bw "Non Guardarmi".

In 1968, the label severed its ties with distributor C&C and moved their product through the newly formed Clan Celentano Distributing Co.

== History ==
=== 1960s ===
In 1962, Ricky Gianco's single, "Tu vedrai" bw "Il mio mondo", "Non c'è pietà" was released on Clan Celentano ACC 24006.

Previously known as Brenda Bis on another label, Maria Luigia recorded for Clan Celentano, releasing the single "Loro Sanno Dove" bw "L'Ultimato" in 1968. It was noted by Billboard in the February 3, 1968 issue that Don Backy had left Clan Calentano and had formed his own production company called Amico. There were some issues between himself and his former label. According to Clan Calentano, Backy had not fulfilled his contractual obligations. The matter was also in court. It was also noted by Billboard in the February 3 issue that Alessandro Celentano, who in the past had been the managing director for Clan Celentano had come back into the music industry and was now a partner and general manager of CIP- Cantanti and New Sound.

It was reported in the February 8, 1969 issue of Cash Box that Phono Box head, Tony Tromeros had secured the disc rights to Adriano Celentano via the Clan Celentano label line. Also in 1969, Fred Bongusto's single, "Una striscia di mare" / "Ciao nemica" was released on Celentano BF 69007.

=== 1970s ===
In 1970, the Brett Marvin and the Thunderbolts self-titled album for Brett Marvin and the Thunderbolts was released on Clan Celentano BF/ES/LP 7020. Also that year, PPX artist Anthony Swete had his self-titled album released on Clan Celentano BF ES LP 7021. Also that year, the ninth Cantagiro contest was held. It finished on July 11. Celentano artists included, Adriano who participated in the A category, Pio and Valeria Rigano in the B category and Katty Line in the C category.

=== 1980s to 2000s ===
In 1996, the label released a CD single of recordings by Milena Cantù. The songs, "Bang Bang" and "Che Importa A Me" were released on both BMG 0743213533728 and Clan Celentano CLCD 353372.

On the week of December 29, 2001, Adriano Celentano's album Il Cuore, LA Voce, released on the Clan Celentano label made its debut at no. 54 in the European Top 100 Albums chart.

== See also ==
- Category:Clan Celentano artists
