= Noi, ragazzi di oggi =

"Noi, Ragazzi Di Oggi"

Single by Luis Miguel

from the album Canta En Italiano
- B-side: "Il cielo"
- Released: February 1985
- Studio: Back Studio, Milan
- Label: EMI Italiana
- Songwriters: Toto Cutugno; Cristiano Minellono

Luis Miguel singles chronology
"Isabel" (1985)	"Noi, Ragazzi Di Oggi" (1985)	"Ahora Te Puedes Marchar" (1987)

"Noi, Ragazzi Di Oggi" (transl. "We, young people of today") is a musical piece written by Cristiano Minellono and Toto Cutugno, performed by Luis Miguel and released by EMI Italiana in 1985.

== Background ==
Miguel, who arrived in Italy when he was almost fifteen, participated in the 1985 Sanremo Music Festival with this song, finishing second in the Campioni category, behind the winners, Ricchi e Poveri, with "Se m'innamoro". Released as a single, it reached the top of the charts on 23 February 1985, and held that position for three weeks, before dropping to second place, preceded by "Una storia importante" by Eros Ramazzotti, for the next four weeks. By the end of the year, it ranked seventh on the list of best-selling singles in Italy.

The song was translated into Spanish as "Los muchachos de hoy", and was part of the soundtrack for the film Fiebre de amor in 1985, in which Luis Miguel also plays a co-starring role.

== Track listing ==
- 7" single
1. "Noi, ragazzi di oggi" (Toto Cutugno, Cristiano Minellono) 3:40
2. "Il cielo" (Toto Cutugno, Cristiano Minellono) 4:10

== Charts ==
=== Weekly charts ===
Chart (1985–1986)	Peak position
Argentina (CAPIF)	2
Belgium (Ultratop 50 Flanders)	37
Italy (Musica e dischi)	1

=== Year-end charts ===
Chart (1985)	Peak position
Italy (Musica e dischi)	7

== See also ==
- List of number-one hits of 1985 (Italy)
