= Mamma Maria =

1982 single by Ricchi e Poveri

Single by Ricchi e Poveri

from the album Mamma Maria
- B-side: "Malinteso"
- Released: 1982
- Genre: Italo disco
- Length: 2:56
- Label: Baby
- Songwriters: Cristiano Minellono; Dario Farina

Ricchi e Poveri singles chronology
"Piccolo amore" (1982)	"Mamma Maria" (1982)	"Ciao Italy ciao amore" (1983)

"Mamma Maria" is a song composed by Cristiano Minellono and Dario Farina and performed by the Italian pop group Ricchi e Poveri. The single was an international hit, which charted in Italy, Germany, Austria, Switzerland, The Netherlands and Belgium.

The song was later covered by several artists, including María Abradelo, James Last, Franz Lambert, Willy Sommers, Little Big, Grupa 777 and Luisa Pepe. In 2006 the song was used for a series of Parmigiano-Reggiano commercials.

== Track listing and formats ==
- Italian 7-inch single

A. "Mamma Maria" – 2:56
B. "Malinteso" – 3:21

== Charts ==
=== Weekly charts ===
Weekly chart performance for "Mamma Maria"
Chart (1983)	Peak position
Austria (Ö3 Austria Top 40)	11
Belgium (Ultratop 50 Flanders)	38
Netherlands (Dutch Top 40)	27
Netherlands (Single Top 100)	33
Spain (AFYVE)	3
Switzerland (Schweizer Hitparade)	5
West Germany (GfK)	11

2026 weekly chart performance
Chart (2026)	Peak position
El Salvador Airplay (ASAP EGC) Spanish version	8

=== Year-end charts ===
Year-end chart performance for "Mamma Maria"
Chart (1983)	Position
West Germany (Official German Charts)	73

== Certifications ==
Region	Certification	Certified units/sales
Italy (FIMI) sales from 2009	Gold	50,000^{‡}
^{‡} Sales+streaming figures based on certification alone.
