= Deus (album) =

Studio album by Adriano Celentano
- Released: 1981
- Label: Clan

Adriano Celentano chronology
Un po' artista un po' no (1980)	Deus (1981)	Uh... uh... (1982)

Deus is a studio album by Italian singer Adriano Celentano, released in 1981 on his label Clan.

The album consists entirely of covers of rock'n'roll standards. It can be considered the first in the series of Celentano's albums using this concept — followed by I miei americani... (1984) and I miei americani... 2 (1986).

== Track listing ==
No.	Title	Length
1.	"Deus"	5:41
2.	"Mi fanno ridere"	4:23
3.	"Crazy Movie"	2:19
4.	"Quando"	3:45
5.	"L'artigiano"	7:12
6.	"L'estate è già qua"	2:35
7.	"Dove vai Jack?"	3:23
8.	"L'ora del rock"	2:22

== Charts ==
Chart (1981)	Peak position
Italy (Musica e dischi)	5
