= Laban (band) =

Danish synthpop group

- Origin: Denmark
- Genres: New wave; synth-pop; Eurodisco
- Years active: 1982–1988
- Labels: EMI; Mega Records
- Past members: Lecia Jønsson; Ivan Pedersen

Laban was a 1980s Eurodisco duo consisting of Danish singers Lecia Jønsson and Ivan Pedersen. Both Pedersen and Jønsson were born in Denmark and originally sang in Danish, finding immediate success in their native country with their debut single "Hvor ska' vi sove i nat?" Laban quickly became one of Denmark's most popular music acts of the 1980s following the release of their subsequent Danish albums, which achieved platinum record status.

In 1986, the duo expanded into international releases with albums sung in English, allowing Laban to find limited international success. Their biggest hit, "Love in Siberia," broke into the American charts in the United States and found substantial popularity in Europe and Scandinavian territories. Laban's 1986 album, Caught by Surprise, also performed well and became the duo's most well-known album. The success of Caught by Surprise allowed Laban to release a second international album, Roulette, in 1987. Pedersen and Jønsson went their separate ways in 1988, ending Laban. The success they found allowed Laban's music to be released in over forty countries worldwide.

== History ==
=== Formation and success in Denmark ===
In 1981, manager and producer Cai Leitner heard "Sarà perché ti amo" by Ricchi e Poveri, and thinking that it had the potential to be a hit single, he wanted a Danish version recorded. Through his secretary, Leitner requested for Danish producer and singer-songwriter Ivan Pedersen to rewrite the song in Danish. Leitner also suggested to Pedersen to record the song as a duet with Lecia Jønsson, a singer who was affiliated with EMI. The song was called "Hvor ska' vi sove i nat?" ("Where Are We Going to Sleep Tonight?").

However, since both singers were involved in other projects, it was decided that the single would be released under a different name after consultation with the record company. Producer Tommy Seebach suggested the name Laban, inspired by Abba, which also included two A's. Seebach, an "in-house" producer at EMI, then had the song recorded in November 1981 with the identities of Pedersen and Jønsson remaining anonymous.

"Hvor ska' vi sove i nat?" was released in March 1982, and the record company used the anonymity for a PR campaign where music critics competed to guess who performed it. In turn, the campaign garnered significant attention, promoting sales of the single and making Pedersen and Jønsson's identities quickly known among the public. "Hvor ska' vi sove i nat?" became an instant hit in Denmark, resulting in the duo touring across the country to promote the single, which has sold over a million copies to date.

Due to the song's success, a self-titled debut album, Laban, was swiftly recorded and released in October 1982, becoming a gold record on the day it released. The album featured a second song cover titled "Jeg ka' li' dig alligevel" (I Like You Anyway), originally released as "Angel from Paradise" by the Dutch group Hot Shot. The debut album was followed by Laban 2 in 1983 and Laban 3 in 1984, which were sung in Danish and reached platinum status in Denmark. During this time, Laban released their second hit single "Meget bedre nu" (Much Better Now), which reached #3 in autumn 1983.

In 1985, Laban left EMI after Leitner persuaded the duo to sign a contract with Mega Records. After signing with Mega Records, Laban's sound was developed further, including the incorporation of more synthesizers into their music to appeal to the younger crowd. Following the duo's departure from the label, EMI released a greatest hits compilation called "Laban's bedste," which peaked at #26 in Denmark. Laban's next Danish album, Laban 4, was released in October 1985, along with a single titled "Kold som is" (Cold as Ice), which went to #4 in Denmark. Due to the success of "Kold som is," it was decided that Laban's music would be recorded in English for international releases.

=== Caught by Surprise, Love in Siberia, and international success ===
After Laban 4, Laban recorded their first English album, an LP called Caught by Surprise that consisted of English versions of songs from prior releases. One of the songs on the album was "Love in Siberia," an English version of "Kold som is." It was requested that a song be written for Laban that could achieve the same success as Laura Branigan's "Self Control," so Pedersen wrote the song in inspiration of Branigan's hit single. "Love in Siberia" would become Laban's biggest global hit, with a music video being filmed in the Canary Islands in Spain and Laban's native Denmark in August 1986.

"Love in Siberia" spent 4 weeks on the Billboard Hot 100, peaking at #88 in November 1986, and subsequently reaching #38 on the U.S. Dance Chart and #47 on the Cash Box chart in early 1987. "Love in Siberia" made Laban only the fifth Danish act to break into the Billboard Hot 100 at the time, while also leading to further international success in Europe, Latin America, and Scandinavian territories like Sweden.

Caught by Surprise was released in the United States on September 15, 1986. The title track, "Caught by Surprise," was a cover of "Senza Tregua" (Without Rest), originally released in 1984 by the Italian group Élite. Laban's English cover reached #9 in Sweden, where the album subsequently reached #28. The third international single from Caught by Surprise was "Donna Donna," a cover version of the late John Hatting's "Donna Donna" that Pedersen helped co-write.

However, at the time of the album's release, Pedersen and Jønsson began feeling worn out, with Jønsson expressing interest by October 1986 to end the partnership, but they continued working together due to the success of "Love in Siberia."

=== Roulette and fading popularity ===
Following the success of Caught by Surprise and the previous singles, Laban released a second and final international album titled Roulette in August 1987, composed of English versions of songs on the yet-to-be released Laban 5 and some from Laban 4. The songs on Roulette fell more into the genres of new wave and rock music rather than the Eurodisco and Synthpop genres of Caught by Surprise.

Four singles were released, including "Prisoner of the Night," a cover of "Dein Ist Mein Ganzes Herz" by Heinz Rudolf Kunze, but Roulette and its singles failed to achieve the same level of international success as prior releases. The album managed to peak at #25 for two weeks in Sweden, but record sales of the album were lackluster elsewhere. "Prisoner of the Night" briefly managed to peak at #16 in the Danish charts, but Laban's popularity was fading by the latter part of 1987, and record sales in their native Denmark had stagnated.

Laban's final studio album, as well as their last Danish album, was Laban 5, released on October 26, 1987. Laban's last Danish single was written by Pedersen and titled "De vilde er de værste" (The Wild Ones Are the Worst). The B side was written by Jønsson and titled "Hvor ka' vi mødes" (Where Can We Meet). Neither song had an English version recorded.

=== Dissolution ===
Internal disagreements and extensive touring eventually took their toll on Pedersen and Jønsson. Additionally, without another single achieving the same success as "Love in Siberia", the future seemed bleak for Laban by 1988. Laban's last single was a cover of Dusty Springfield's "I Close My Eyes and Count to Ten," released in 1988 and featured on the Laban: Greatest Hits compilation; a compilation that was released in part due to the lackluster sales of Roulette. Cai Leitner also left Mega Records in 1988, leaving Pedersen and Jønsson without a producer. In combination with their popularity fading, disagreements over Laban's future, and feeling like the record company was throttling down on them, Laban split up in the summer of 1988 following a short tour for Laban 5 in Sweden.

Since the dissolution, Pedersen has remained active in the music industry with various projects, releasing solo material and forming bands such as Backseat. Jønsson started a solo career while stepping away from the public eye, continuing to sing and releasing solo material. In 2007, Jønsson expressed interest in reuniting with Pedersen, but the talks were brief, and no reunion was solidified. The duo has only met a few times since, with no current plans for Laban to reunite.

A box set titled "Komplet & Rariteter" was released in 2010, containing Laban's entire back catalog of music, including new remasters of every Laban album, previously unreleased tracks, and remixed versions of singles that had remained exlucsive to select countries.

In 2017, Pedersen published his memoir, "Med Hjerte Udenpå" (With a Heart on the Outside), reflecting on his experience in the music industry and time in Laban.

In 2023, Jønsson published a book called "Det' en hem’lighed" (It's a Secret) that reflected on her time in Laban and behind-the-scenes conflicts, garnering criticism from Pedersen.

== Discography ==
=== Albums ===
- Laban (1982)
- Laban 2 (1983)
- Laban 3 (1984)
- Laban 4 (1985)
- Caught by Surprise (1986)
- Roulette (1987)
- Laban 5 (1987)

=== Singles ===
- "Hvor ska' vi sove i nat?" (Where Are We Going to Sleep Tonight?)
- "Meget bedre nu" (Much Better Now)
- "Kold som is" (Danish version of "Love in Siberia")
- "Caught by Surprise"
- "Love in Siberia"
- "Donna Donna"
- "Russian Roulette"
- "Prisoner of the Night"
- "Down on Your Knees"
- "Don't Stop"
- "De vilde er de værste" (The Wild Ones Are the Worst)
- "I Close My Eyes and Count to Ten"

=== Compilations ===
- Laban's bedste (1985)
- Laban: Greatest Hits (1988)
- De største narrestreger (1997)
- The Collection (2000)
- De 36 bedste narrestreger (2009)
- Komplet & rariteter (2010)
- Love in Siberia - The Best Of Laban (2010)
