= List of number-one hits of 1985 (Italy) =

This is a list of number-one songs in 1985 on the Italian charts compiled weekly by the Italian Hit Parade Singles Chart.

== Chart history Album ==
Issue date	Album	Artist
5 gennaio	I miei americani...	Adriano Celentano
12 gennaio	Make It Big	Wham!
19 gennaio	Make It Big	Wham!
26 gennaio	Make It Big	Wham!
2 febbraio	Make It Big	Wham!
9 febbraio	Make It Big	Wham!
16 febbraio	Sanremo ‘85	Various Artist
23 febbraio	Arena	Duran Duran
2 marzo	Arena	Duran Duran
9 marzo	Arena	Duran Duran
16 marzo	Arena	Duran Duran
23 marzo	Arena	Duran Duran
30 marzo	Parade	Spandau Ballet
6 aprile	Parade	Spandau Ballet
13 aprile	Parade	Spandau Ballet
20 aprile	Parade	Spandau Ballet
27 aprile	Parade	Spandau Ballet
4 maggio	We Are the World	USA for Africa
11 maggio	We Are the World	USA for Africa
18 maggio	We Are the World	USA for Africa
25 maggio	We Are the World	USA for Africa
1º giugno	We Are the World	USA for Africa
8 giugno	The Dream of the Blue Turtles	Sting
15 giugno	La vita è adesso	Claudio Baglioni
22 giugno	La vita è adesso	Claudio Baglioni
29 giugno	La vita è adesso	Claudio Baglioni
6 luglio	La vita è adesso	Claudio Baglioni
13 luglio	La vita è adesso	Claudio Baglioni
20 luglio	La vita è adesso	Claudio Baglioni
27 luglio	La vita è adesso	Claudio Baglioni
3 agosto	La vita è adesso	Claudio Baglioni
10 agosto	La vita è adesso	Claudio Baglioni
17 agosto	La vita è adesso	Claudio Baglioni
24 agosto	La vita è adesso	Claudio Baglioni
31 agosto	La vita è adesso	Claudio Baglioni
7 settembre	La vita è adesso	Claudio Baglioni
14 settembre	La vita è adesso	Claudio Baglioni
21 settembre	La vita è adesso	Claudio Baglioni
28 settembre	La vita è adesso	Claudio Baglioni
5 ottobre	La vita è adesso	Claudio Baglioni
12 ottobre	La vita è adesso	Claudio Baglioni
19 ottobre	La vita è adesso	Claudio Baglioni
26 ottobre	La vita è adesso	Claudio Baglioni
2 novembre	La vita è adesso	Claudio Baglioni
9 novembre	La vita è adesso	Claudio Baglioni
16 novembre	La vita è adesso	Claudio Baglioni
23 novembre	La vita è adesso	Claudio Baglioni
30 novembre	La vita è adesso	Claudio Baglioni
7 dicembre	La vita è adesso	Claudio Baglioni
14 dicembre	La vita è adesso	Claudio Baglioni
21 dicembre	Promise	Sade
28 dicembre	So Red the Rose	Arcadia

=== Number-one artists ===
Position	Artist	Weeks at No. 1
1	Claudio Baglioni	27
2	USA for Africa	6
2	Duran Duran	6
4	Spandau Ballet	5
4	Wham!	5
6	Sade	1
6	Sting	1
6	Arcadia	1
6	Various Artist	1

== Chart history Single ==
Issue Date	Song	Artist(s)	Ref.
January 5	"Careless Whisper"	George Michael	
January 12	"Careless Whisper"	George Michael	
January 19	"Careless Whisper"	George Michael	
January 26	"Do They Know It's Christmas?"	Band Aid	
February 2	"Do They Know It's Christmas?"	Band Aid	
February 9	"Do They Know It's Christmas?"	Band Aid	
February 16	"The Wild Boys"	Duran Duran	
February 23	"Noi, ragazzi di oggi"	Luis Miguel	
March 2	"Noi, ragazzi di oggi"	Luis Miguel	
March 9	"Noi, ragazzi di oggi"	Luis Miguel	
March 16	"Una Storia Importante"	Eros Ramazzotti	
March 23	"Una Storia Importante"	Eros Ramazzotti	
March 30	"Una Storia Importante"	Eros Ramazzotti	
April 6	"Una Storia Importante"	Eros Ramazzotti	
April 13	"We Are the World"	USA for Africa	
April 20	"We Are the World"	USA for Africa	
April 27	"We Are the World"	USA for Africa	
May 4	"We Are the World"	USA for Africa	
May 11	"We Are the World"	USA for Africa	
May 18	"We Are the World"	USA for Africa	
May 25	"We Are the World"	USA for Africa	
June 1	"We Are the World"	USA for Africa	
June 8	"We Are the World"	USA for Africa	
June 15	"We Are the World"	USA for Africa	
June 22	"We Are the World"	USA for Africa	
June 29	"A View to a Kill"	Duran Duran	
July 6	"A View to a Kill"	Duran Duran	
July 13	"A View to a Kill"	Duran Duran	
July 20	"A View to a Kill"	Duran Duran	
July 27	"A View to a Kill"	Duran Duran	
August 3	"A View to a Kill"	Duran Duran	
August 10	"19"	Paul Hardcastle	
August 17	"L'estate sta finendo"	Righeira	
August 24	"L'estate sta finendo"	Righeira	
August 31	"Into the Groove"	Madonna	
September 7	"Into the Groove"	Madonna	
September 14	"Into the Groove"	Madonna	
September 21	"Into the Groove"	Madonna	
September 28	"Into the Groove"	Madonna	
October 5	"Into the Groove"	Madonna	
October 12	"Into the Groove"	Madonna	
October 19	"Into the Groove"	Madonna	
October 26	"Into the Groove"	Madonna	
November 2	"Into the Groove"	Madonna	
November 9	"Into the Groove"	Madonna	
November 16	"Alive and Kicking"	Simple Minds	
November 23	"Election Day"	Arcadia	
November 30	"Election Day"	Arcadia	
December 7	"Election Day"	Arcadia	
December 14	"Election Day"	Arcadia	
December 21	"Election Day"	Arcadia	
December 28	"Election Day"	Arcadia	

== Number-one artists ==
Position	Artist	Weeks #1
1	Madonna	11
1	USA for Africa	11
2	Duran Duran	7
3	Arcadia	6
4	Eros Ramazzotti	4
5	Band Aid	3
5	George Michael	3
5	Luis Miguel	3
6	Righeira	2
7	Paul Hardcastle	1
7	Simple Minds	1
