= Ivan Pedersen =

Danish composer

- Born: Ivan Pedersen; 22 April 1950 (age 76); Jebjerg, Denmark
- Occupations: Singer; songwriter; composer; producer; drummer
- Years active: 1966-present
- Known for: McKinleys; Laban; Backseat; Sing Sing Sing
- Spouse: Jytte Poulsen (m. 1977; died 2025)

Ivan Pedersen (born 22 April 1950) is a Danish composer, singer, drummer, and producer who has released over 20 albums since starting his music career in 1966. He was the drummer and singer of the Danish band McKinleys from 1966 to 1980 and later formed the duo Laban with Lecia Jønsson, which lasted from 1982 to 1988. Laban achieved moderate international success with their album Caught by Surprise and the 1986 single "Love in Siberia." After Laban's dissolution, Pedersen, along with Helge Solberg, Svenne Wahlin, and Søren Jacobsen, formed Backseat in 1992. Pedersen won a Danish Grammy award, released multiple solo studio albums, and has written and produced for a number of other Danish artists. Pedersen has often been highlighted as one of Denmark's best singers.

== Career ==
=== McKinleys ===
In 1966, Pedersen and a group of friends decided to form a pop band, and hence created the band McKinleys. Pedersen was the band's drummer and lead vocalist, and with the band's creation, his music career officially began. In 1972, after becoming established in Denmark, the group began serious efforts to break into the music industry, touring in European countries like Norway, Sweden, England, and Germany. In 1973, their first studio album was released, and in total, McKinleys released five albums between 1973 and 1980. As the band members were becoming busy with other jobs and having children, the band dissolved at the start of 1980. Despite stopping at the start of the year, the band sang "Robin Hood" for the Danish Melodi Grand Prix, and this would be followed by a string of concerts in 1981 after a temporary revival of the band. In the decades since, the members have occasionally gotten together for various performances and small releases.

After McKinleys's dissolution, Pedersen began composing and producing for other artists. In 1982, Pedersen and Peter Grønbæk formed the short-lived band Taxie, which entered the Danish Melodi Grand Prix with "Drømmene er forbi." The song yielded last place.

=== Laban and international success ===
In 1982, with the help of record label EMI, Pedersen and another Danish singer, Lecia Jønsson, formed Laban. Laban was formed after producer Cai Leitner heard Ricchi e Poveri's "Sarà perché ti amo" and thought it had the potential to be a hit single in Denmark. Leitner requested Pedersen to write Danish lyrics for a Danish version, which would be recorded in November 1981 as a duo between Pedersen and Jønsson. The song was called "Hvor ska' vi sove i nat?" ("Where Are We Going to Sleep Tonight?"), and it was released in March 1982. The song was a huge hit in Denmark and has sold over a million copies to date. Laban continued finding great success in Denmark and in other European countries, with their first three albums reaching Platinum status in Denmark.

In 1986, Laban expanded into international releases after Laban 4 with an English LP called Caught by Surprise that consisted of English versions of songs from prior releases. One of the songs on Caught by Surprise was "Love in Siberia," an English version of "Kold som is," a single that went to #4 in Denmark the previous year. It was requested that a song be written for Laban that could achieve the same success as Laura Branigan's "Self Control," so Pedersen wrote the song in inspiration of Branigan's hit single. "Love in Siberia" broke into the American charts, peaking at #88 on the Billboard Hot 100 in November 1986, as well as subsequently reaching #38 on the U.S. Dance Chart and #47 on the Cash Box chart in early 1987. "Love in Siberia" became Laban's biggest hit, also achieving the duo's popularity across Europe.

Laban would release their second and final English album, Roulette, in August 1987. Four singles were released, including "Prisoner of the Night," a cover of "Dein Ist Mein Ganzes Herz" by Heinz Rudolf Kunze, but Roulette and its singles failed to achieve the same level of international success as prior releases. Laban's popularity was fading by the latter part of 1987, and record sales in their native Denmark had stagnated. In the summer of 1988, after a tour for Laban 5 in Sweden, Laban split up following fading popularity and disagreements of the group's future.

=== Post-Laban efforts ===
Shortly before Laban stopped, Pedersen had begun a collaboration with Poul Krebs, in whose band he, together with Henning Sterk, formed Denmark's Highest Male Choir. He has also been a singer with Morten Kærså and has written for and participated in Moonjam's albums. In 1989, Pedersen formed Ivan & The Small Wonders, with its lineup being guitarist Søren Jacobsen, pianist Ole Boskov, guitarist Lars Krarup, bassist Thomas Fog, and drummer Kristian Lassen. The band released only a single album in 1989 before the project dissolved, with very few copies of the album allegedly being manufactured. The following year, Pedersen and Jacobsen established their own recording studio in 1990. Also in 1990, Pedersen was being considered to be chosen as the lead singer for the English rock band Deep Purple. Pedersen had sung backing vocals on the Pretty Maids album Jump the Gun (released in 1990), which Deep Purple bassist Roger Glover had produced. When the band's lead singer Ian Gillan had been fired, Glover suggested Ivan Pedersen as a replacement. However, the choice fell instead on Joe Lynn Turner of the English band Rainbow.

=== Backseat and solo releases ===
Pedersen performed with the group Moonjam until 1992, which gave him contact with Helge Solberg and later Svenne Wahlin. Pedersen, Solberg, Wahlin, and Søren Jacobsen formed the band called Backseat, which was initially called Backseat Boys, and the band released their debut album that year. The band was nominated for a Grammy at the Danish Music Awards in 1993, and three more albums were released in close succession between 1994 and 1996.

Backseat was put on hold when Pedersen went into the studio in 2000 to record his first solo album, Monogram, which was released the following year. After a tour of Denmark, another solo album followed, and in 2005, Pedersen participated in the Tivoli Variety Theatre with Søren Østergaard and Sidse Babett Knudsen. The show was performed in both the Circus Building and the Concert Hall Aarhus with great success. Backseat played a few concerts in the autumn of 2005, and Pedersen was also on tour with his solo repertoire. After nine years, Backseat released their sixth studio album in the winter of 2007 titled Globalization. In 2010, Pedersen formed another band called Sing Sing Sing. Although it's a side project for the members, the group is often on tour.

Backseat's last album to date, Seasoned and Served, was released in 2013. Pedersen has since released two more solo albums, Min verden er venlig (2016), and Fortunate (2023). In addition to his own projects, Pedersen has written and produced music for numerous Danish artists throughout his career, and has also been a sought-after choir and backing singer, having sung with choirs for several other artists.

In 2017, Pedersen published his memoir titled "Med Hjerte Udenpå" (With a Heart on the Outside), discussing his experience in the music industry and time in Laban.

On 8 April 2025, Pedersen's wife, Jytte Marianne Poulsen, died.

== Discography ==
=== With McKinleys ===
- Pick Up Passion (1973)
- McKinleys (1977)
- Ballroom Heroes (1978)
- New Shoes for the Old Suit (1979)
- Robin Hood (1980)
- McKinleys 16 Hits (1993)
- McKinleys 16 Hits Vol. 2 (1993)

=== With Laban ===
- Laban (1982)
- Laban 2 (1983)
- Laban 3 (1984)
- Laban's bedste (1985)
- Laban 4 (1985)
- Caught by Surprise (1986)
- Roulette (1987)
- Laban 5 (1987)
- Laban: Greatest Hits (1988)
- De største narrestreger (1997)
- De 36 bedste narrestreger (2009)
- Komplet & rariteter (2010)
- Love in Siberia - The Best Of Laban (2010)

=== With Backseat ===
- Wind Me Up (1992)
- Long Distance (1994)
- Hit Home (1995)
- Songs (1996)
- Shut Up and Play (1998)
- Globalization (2007)
- Seasoned & Served (2013)

=== Solo ===
- Monogram (2001)
- Udenfor nummer men venlig stemt (2004)
- Memo - 40 års jubilæumsbox (2006)
- Min verden er venlig (2016)
- Fortunate (2023)

== See also ==
- List of Danish composers
