= Lecia Jønsson =

Danish singer

- Born: Lecia Sundstrøm Hansen; 18 September 1948 (age 77); Avedøre, Denmark
- Occupations: Singer; songwriter
- Years active: 1961-present
- Known for: Lecia & Lucienne; The Scarlets; Laban
- Spouse: Steen Jønsson (m. 1967; div. 1980)

Lecia Jønsson (born 18 September 1948) is a Danish singer and songwriter, known for performing in a duo with her sister, Lucienne Sundstrøm, and later being in the duo Laban with Ivan Pedersen, where they achieved great popularity in their home country and limited international success in Europe and the United States.

Jønsson's musical career started in 1961 when she and Lucienne Sundstrøm began performing as a duo, Lecia & Lucienne, and both sisters later became members of the Danish band The Scarlets. After leaving The Scarlets, Lecia & Lucienne had a hit single in Denmark titled "Rør Ved Mig," which garnered substantial popularity in autumn 1973. Sundstrøm retired from the music industry in 1981, thus leading Jønsson to start a solo career.

In 1982, Jønsson, alongside drummer and singer-songwriter Ivan Pedersen, formed the duo Laban. As a pair, Jønsson and Pedersen found substantial popularity in Denmark with their debut single, "Hvor ska' vi sove i nat?" The song, an instant smash hit, went to #3 in Denmark and has sold over a million copies to date. In 1986, Laban broke into the American charts with their single "Love in Siberia," which peaked at #88 on the Billboard Hot 100. "Love in Siberia" also peaked #38 on the U.S. Dance Chart and #47 on the Cash Box chart in early 1987. The success of "Love in Siberia" also bolstered further success in Europe, Latin America, and Scandinavian territories like Sweden, where the duo's follow-up singles, such as "Caught by Surprise" and "Donna Donna," reached moderate success. Laban ended in 1988 after Jønsson and Pedersen ceased performing together.

Since Laban's dissolution, Jønsson has maintained a solo career in the following decades, regularly participating in the Danish Melodi Grand Prix until 1990. In 1992, Jønsson stepped out of the public eye, but has recorded music in a variety of genres, including Pop, Eurodisco, Synth-pop, Country, and Jazz. Since 1961, music that Jønsson has recorded or produced has sold over 1.5 million copies.

== Career ==
=== Lecia & Lucienne (1961 - 1981) ===
During her childhood, Jønsson enjoyed music and purchased her first guitar at age twelve. Upon discovering that her younger sister, Lucienne Sundstrøm (b. 25 July 1951), also had a singing talent, the two sisters started performing together under the name Lecia & Lucienne.

They debuted in 1961 at a singing competition in Damhuskroen, where they placed third. After their successful debut, their professional music career started. Jønsson and Sundstrøm released their first single, "Waiting on the Corner," on 5 January, 1964. Otto Brandenburg requested Jønsson and Sundstrøm to hear "a couple of songs," which were "Waiting on the Corner" and "Wishing to Kiss You." The sisters recorded the two songs for their debut single, and after release, the single achieved airplay in Avedøre.

As their popularity increased, Jønsson and Sundstrøm became sought-after soloists, touring with various Danish acts and performing as choir girls on over five hundred recordings. In 1965, they became members of The Scarlets, singing lead vocals on the hits "She Taught Me How to Yodel" and "Man klarer alting med et smil" (One Can Handle Everything With a Smile). Their first tenure with the group lasted until 1969, although they returned to performing with the group decades later.

In 1973, Jønsson and Sundstrøm signed with Metronome, where they found success with their hit singles "Rør Ved Mig" (Touch Me) and Waterloo, with "Rør Ved Mig" selling 25,000 copies. In 1979 and 1980, Jønsson and Sundstrøm performed together for the Danish Melodi Grand Prix, placing 7th on both occasions. After releasing two English-language LPs, their music partnership ended after Sundstrøm retired from the industry in 1981. Following the dissolution of Lecia & Lucienne, Jønsson started a solo career under producer Tommy Seebach.

=== Laban with Ivan Pedersen (1982 - 1988) ===
In 1981, producer Cai Leitner heard "Sarà perché ti amo" by Ricchi e Poveri, and subsequently thought it could be a hit single. He wanted a Danish version recorded and requested that Ivan Pedersen write the song with Danish lyrics and record it as a duet with Jønsson. The resulting song, "Hvor ska' vi sove i nat?" ("Where Are We Going to Sleep Tonight?"), was recorded in November 1981. Since both Jønsson and Pedersen were involved in other projects at the time, Tommy Seebach suggested that the single be released under the name Laban.

"Hvor ska' vi sove i nat?" was released in March 1982, finding immediate success in the duo's native Denmark, where it has sold a million copies to date. Initial expectations were that the partnership would only last a few months, even though Jønsson and Pedersen enjoyed performing together. However, due to the success of the duo's debut single, a self-titled album, Laban, was subsequently recorded and released in October 1982, becoming a gold record on the day it released.

As a duo, Jønsson and Pedersen became a breakout act in Denmark. Their next album was Laban 2, which was accompanied by a single, "Meget bedre nu" ("Much Better Now"), becoming their second Top 10 hit in Denmark. "Meget bedre nu" reached #3 in autumn 1983. Laban, Laban 2 and their third album, Laban 3, all achieved platinum status in Denmark, selling over 100,000 copies each, and making Laban the first Danish act to have three platinum LP albums in a row. Jønsson recalled the first two years of her partnership with Pedersen being prosperous. "We were almost a couple on stage. We had roles. Ivan jumped around after me and was the naughty one, and I was the shy one... I love to make fun of myself, and love humor."

In 1985, Leitner persuaded Jønsson and Pedersen to sign a contract with Mega Records. Following this, they departed from EMI, and Laban's sound was developed further to include the incorporation of more synthesizers into their music to appeal to the younger crowd. After Laban left EMI, EMI then released a greatest hits compilation that year called "Laban's bedste", which peaked at #26 in Denmark. In October 1985, Laban's next album, Laban 4 saw a release, alongside their next hit single "Kold som is" ("Cold as Ice") that got to #4 in their home country. After their continual success in Denmark, Jønsson and Pedersen began expanding into international releases.

The duo broke into the American music charts with their 1986 single "Love in Siberia", an English version of "Kold som is." "Love in Siberia" peaked at #88 on the Billboard Hot 100, #38 on the U.S. Dance Chart, and #47 on the Cash Box chart. The success of "Love in Siberia" made Laban only the fifth Danish act to break into the Billboard Hot 100 at the time. Laban's mainstream popularity was found with the success of "Love in Siberia" and their English LP Caught by Surprise, causing their music to be released in over forty countries worldwide. Laban found substantial popularity in Scandinavian territories like Sweden, where the album reached #28 and the title track single "Caught by Surprise" reached #9.

Jønsson was one of the primary songwriters alongside Pedersen for Laban's music, and songs Jønsson wrote included "It's a Fantasy," "Playboy / Playgirl," and "Limit to Love." However, due to the stress of constantly performing and internal tensions escalating, Jønsson began expressing interest in ending Laban by October 1986.

In August 1987, Laban released their second international album, Roulette. The album was composed of English versions of songs on the yet-to-be released Laban 5 and some from Laban 4. However, Roulette and its singles failed to achieve the same international success as prior releases. The album managed to peak at #25 for two weeks in Sweden, but record sales of the album were lackluster elsewhere. Laban's popularity was fading by late 1987, and record sales in their native Denmark had stagnated. Laban's final studio album, as well as their last Danish album, was Laban 5, released on 26 October, 1987. The A-side of Laban's final Danish single, "De vilde er de værste" ("The Wild Ones Are the Worst"), was written by Pedersen, while Jønsson wrote the B-side, "Hvor ka' vi mødes" ("Where Can We Meet").

Due to disagreements about Laban's future, fading popularity, and declining record sales, Laban ended in the summer of 1988 after a short tour in Sweden for Laban 5, and Jønsson ceased working with Pedersen. Jønsson later stated that her and Ivan were "cheated out of millions" due to contracts under Mega Records; a sentiment that Pedersen felt similarly to.

Despite the conflicts in the latter years of Laban's tenure, Jønsson still enjoys the music she made with Pedersen. "I have a blast with the Laban songs today. When I hear the songs, I get a lot of good memories. It was so uplifting to be in the studio and record the songs together. Our voices are in harmony, just like when I sing with my sister, Lucienne. I have never performed Laban songs alone. I don't sing "Rør ved mig" without my sister either. I have Laban's songs with Ivan, so I don't want to do it without him. If he wants to sing them with me, I'd like to."

=== Solo career (1980's - present) ===
Jønsson's solo career began during her time in Laban with her song entries in the Danish Melodi Grand Prix, releasing two singles, "Det' en hemlighed" (It's a Secret) and "Hvis nu lykken findes" (If Happiness Exists). "Det' en hemlighed" managed to reach #6 in the Danish charts, as well as get 5th place in the 1984 Danish Melodi Grand Prix. Jønsson later stated the song was based on her internal feelings in Laban at the time. "Hvis nu lykken findes" was submitted in the 1986 Danish Melodi Grand Prix, getting 6th place.

After Laban's dissolution, Jønsson resumed her solo career with mixed success, achieving second place in the 1989 Danish Melodi Grand Prix with her song "Landet Camelot," scoring thirty points. In 1990, she competed in the Danish Melodi Grand Prix for the last time with the song "Krig Og Fred," tying for 6th place. The same year, Jønsson traveled to Nashville to record her solo album, "For Altid," beginning her tenure in country music. She was nominated for a Grammy in the genre in 1992, but later that year, she withdrew from the public eye, having gotten tired of the spotlight and pressure from the industry.

In 1993, with a limited public presence, Jønsson started singing Jazz music. In total, she released three jazz albums over the next decade. The first, Våde Spor I Sand, was a collaboration with Danish poet and lyricist Ellen Heiberg in 1995. Jønsson self-released two more albums - At Last in 2004 and At Last 2: My Jazzy Love in 2005. However, promotion for these albums was limited, as she later recalled, "I could feel that I didn't have the strength to get through it. I didn't really have the energy to perform anymore."

In August 2005, Jønsson won the "Song of the Year" USA award for her song "It Isn't Love."

In 2007, Jønsson expressed interest in reuniting with Ivan Pedersen to re-form Laban, but the talks were brief, and no reunion was solidified. The following year, Jønsson released her 2008 Christmas EP, which included a cover of "Baby, It's Cold Outside." By 2012, Jønsson, along with her sister Lucienne, had reunited with The Scarlets, becoming honorary life-long members.

In 2019, Jønsson wrote the lyrics for an ABBA tribute titled "ABBA We Love You Forever," themed about young people falling in love while listening to ABBA's music. Overall, she has written music and lyrics for over 100 songs, combined from her time in Laban, solo material, and for other artists. During a gathering for the Danish Artists' Association, Jønsson recalled, "...so many people came up to me to say that they were happy with what I had been to them and meant to their careers. I was seen as a role model. Several of the new stars, both a little older and very young, even wanted a picture with me. It was really nice to feel the recognition. And I think I'm really feeling it now."

In 2023, Jønsson published "Det' en hem’lighed" (It's a Secret), a book and memoir that reflected on her time with Ivan Pedersen in Laban and behind-the-scenes conflicts, garnering criticism from Pedersen.

== Personal life ==
Lecia was born on 18 September 1948 in Avedøre, Denmark, as the eldest child of four girls. In 1967, she married Steen Buchardt Jønsson, remaining together for thirteen years before divorcing in 1980. They had one daughter, Leila, who was born in November 1969.

Steen Jønsson died in 2006.

== Discography ==
=== With Lecia & Lucienne ===
- På Vej (1974)
- Dansktoppen I 5 år (1974)
- Rør Ved Mig (1975)
- Topmøde (ft. Rocking Ghosts) (1975)
- Sister to Sister (1978)
- L&L (1980)

=== With Laban ===
- Laban (1982)
- Laban 2 (1983)
- Laban 3 (1984)
- Laban 4 (1985)
- Caught by Surprise (1986)
- Roulette (1987)
- Laban 5 (1987)

=== Solo ===
- Lecia (1989)
- For Altid (1990)
- Våde Spor I Sand (1995)
- At Last (2004)
- At Last 2: My Jazzy Love (2005)
- Christmas Present (EP, 2008)

=== Compilation albums ===
- Laban's bedste (1985)
- Laban: Greatest Hits (1988)
- Laban: De største narrestreger (1997)
- Det' En Hemlighed (1998)
- Laban: The Collection (2000)
- Laban: De 36 bedste narrestreger (2009)
- Laban: Komplet & rariteter (2010)
- Laban: Love in Siberia - The Best Of Laban (2010)
