= Uh... uh... =

Studio album by Adriano Celentano
- Released: 1982
- Genre: Pop
- Label: Clan
- Producer: Giancarlo Bigazzi; Miki Del Prete

Adriano Celentano chronology
| Deus (1981) | Uh... uh... (1982) | Atmosfera (1983) |

Professional ratings
Review scores
| Source | Rating |
|---|---|
| AllMusic | 4/5 stars |

Uh... uh... is a studio album by Italian singer Adriano Celentano, released in late 1982 on his label Clan.

The album included two songs, "Uh... uh..." and "Jungla di città", from that year's film Bingo Bongo.

== Track listing ==
| No. | Title | Writer(s) | Length |
|---|---|---|---|
| 1. | "Giornata nein" | Giancarlo Bigazzi | 5:28 |
| 2. | "Niente di nuovo" | Bigazzi, Pinuccio Pirazzoli | 5:00 |
| 3. | "Conto su di te" | Bigazzi | 4:18 |
| 4. | "Solo" | Bigazzi | 4:39 |
| 5. | "Uh... uh..." | Adriano Celentano | 5:16 |
| 6. | "Jungla di città" | Bigazzi | 4:55 |
| 7. | "Uomo" | Bigazzi, Lucio Fabbri | 4:27 |
| 8. | "La donna di un rè" | Celentano, Cristiano Minellono | 3:37 |

== Charts ==
| Chart (1982) | Peak position |
|---|---|
| Italy (Musica e dischi) | 8 |
