= Backseat =

Backseat or back seat may refer to:

- A car seat located at the rear of a vehicle
- Backseat (band), Danish pop rock group
- Backseat (album), by Peer Günt, 1986
- "Backseat" (song), by the New Boyz, featuring the Cataracs and Dev, 2011
- "Backseat", a 2025 song by Balu Brigada
- "Backseat", a song by Charli XCX from the 2017 mixtape Pop 2
- "Backseat", a 2021 song by Fergus James
- "Backseat", a song by Fred Again, the Japanese House and Scott Hardkiss from the 2024 album Ten Days
- "Backseat", a song by Khalid from the 2021 mixtape Scenic Drive
- "Backseat", a song by Pop Smoke featuring PnB Rock, from the 2020 album Shoot for the Stars, Aim for the Moon
- "Backseat", a 2022 song by Russ Millions
- "Back Seat", a 2021 song by Anna Lunoe featuring Genesis Owusu

== See also ==
- Back-seat driver, a passenger in a vehicle who gives unwanted advice and/or criticism to the driver
