= I miei americani =

Studio album by Adriano Celentano
- Released: December 1984
- Recorded: 1984
- Studio: Idea Recording; Bach Studio; Regson Studio, Milan
- Genre: Pop
- Length: 37:39
- Label: Clan Celentano
- Producer: Miki Del Prete

Adriano Celentano chronology
Atmosfera (1983)	I miei americani (1984)	Joan Lui (1985)

Professional ratings
Review scores
Source	Rating
AllMusic	3/5 stars

I miei americani, with the subtitle Tre puntini, is a studio album by Italian singer Adriano Celentano, released in 1984 through his own label, Clan Celentano.

== Overview ==
The album consists of world-famous American hits by popular artists (with the exception of the songs "Michelle" by the British rock band the Beatles, and the song "Susanna" by the Dutch band the Art Company). All the songs on this album have been translated into Italian, as well as the arrangements have been changed. The translation of the lyrics is as close as possible to the original.

The album was a great success. It took the first place in the Italian chart, staying in the top ten for twelve weeks. By the end of 1987, the album had sold over 500,000 copies.

== Track listing ==
Side A
No.	Title	Writer(s)	Length
1.	"Il contadino (Hold On, I'm Coming)"	David Porter; Luciano Beretta; Michele Del Prete	4:08
2.	"Michelle"	John Lennon; Paul McCartney; Felice Piccarreda; Ricky Gianco	3:10
3.	"Bisogna far qualcosa (These Boots Are Made for Walkin')"	Lee Hazlewood; Cristiano Minellono	3:25
4.	"Sono un fallito (Busted)"	Harlan Howard; Don Backy; Del Prete	3:18
5.	"Fumo negli occhi (Smoke Gets in Your Eyes)"	Jerome Kern; Mogol	2:52
6.	"Maledetta televisione (That's All Right, Mama)"	Arthur Crudup; Minellono	2:27

Side B
No.	Title	Writer(s)	Length
1.	"Susanna"	Caroline Bogman; Ferdi Lancee; Sergio Caputo; Del Prete	4:45
2.	"Questo vecchio pazzo mondo (Eve of Destruction)"	P. F. Sloan; Luciano Beretta; Del Prete; Mogol	3:56
3.	"Il cantante folle (The Great Pretender)"	Buck Ram; Ornella Ferrari Colombi	4:04
4.	"Cara baby (Happy Baby)"	Bill Haley; Minellono; Pier Francesco Pingitore	2:43
5.	"Sei nel mio destino (You Are My Destiny)"	Paul Anka; Umberto Bertini	2:27

== Personnel ==
- Adriano Celentano – vocals
- Pinuccio Pirazzoli – arrangement, direction
- Nino Jorio, Paolo Bocchi, Pino Vicari – sound engineering
- Alfredo Golino – drums
- Gaetano Leandro – keyboards
- Gigi Cappellotto – bass
- Paolo Steffan – guitar
- Silvano Banfi – photograph
- Miki Del Prete – producer

Credits are adapted from the album's liner notes.

== Charts ==
Chart performance for I miei americani
Chart (1985)	Peak position
Italian Albums (Billboard)	1
Italian Albums (Musica e dischi)	1
