= Barbara Tausia =

Belgian choreographer and dancer (born 1977)

- Born: 8 July 1977 (age 49); Charleroi, Belgium
- Origin: Belgium
- Genres: Dance; Eurodance; trance
- Occupations: DJ; dancer; model
- Years active: 2003–present
- Labels: Do It Yourself; Tunnel Records

Barbara Anelka Tausia (born 8 July 1977) is a Belgian choreographer and dancer. She is the wife of French footballer Nicolas Anelka.

== Biography ==
=== Career ===
Barbara Tausia began her dance and music career as a vocal artist with the French hip hop singer MC Solaar, singing on the song "La La, La La" on his album Cinquième As. In 2003 she was named as the singer of the Italian dance band Eu4ya, releasing a cover of Ricchi e Poveri's "Sarà perché ti amo", following it up in 2004 with a cover of the Steam song "Na Na Hey Hey Kiss Him Goodbye". She is also a dancer on a popular French TV show.

=== Company ===
In 2006 she founded the event and Public Relations company with her business partner Between in Paris. Between agency has several clients such as Adidas, Quick, Sony Ericsson, Reebok, Paris Saint-Germain F.C., and American celebrities such as P. Diddy, Jay-Z and Timbaland. Between also takes care of Nicolas Anelka's press and public relations.

== Discography ==
=== Singles ===
==== with Eu4ya ====
- 2003: "Sarà perché ti amo"
- 2004: "Na Na Hey Hey Kiss Him Goodbye"

==== with MC Solaar ====
- 2001: "La La, La La"

== Personal life ==
She was raised with her family in Belgium and then moved to Paris for her dance career; there she met Nicolas Anelka. They married on 9 June 2007 in Marrakesh, Morocco.
