= Aventura en África =

- Season 4
- Presented by: Paula Vázquez; Nuria Roca
- No. of days: 64
- No. of castaways: 19
- Winner: Víctor Janeiro
- Runner-up: Raquel Muriel
- Location: Tsavo, Kenya
- No. of episodes: 19

Release
- Original network: Antena 3
- Original release: January 11 – March 15, 2005

Season chronology
- ← Previous; La Selva de los FamoS.O.S. Next → Perdidos en el Caribe (2006)

Aventura en África is the fourth season of the show La Isla de los FamoS.O.S. and the sixth overall season of Supervivientes to air in Spain. It was broadcast on Antena 3 from January 11, 2005 to March 15, 2005. This season took place in Kenya and was the first to introduce anonymous contestants with celebrity contestants.

== Season summary ==
With this season the tribes were initially divided into two tribes, Masai (Celebrity) and Samburu (Anonymous). Following the fifth elimination, the tribes into only one tribe. When it came time for the final five, previously eliminated contestants Milagros "Mili" Andreu and Rebeca Pous were voted back in the game by their fellow contestants and next week María Abradelo was chosen to come back by the producers. Ultimately, it was bullfighter Víctor Janeiro who won this season over anonymous Raquel Muriel and took home the grand prize.

== Finishing order ==
Contestant	Famous For	Original tribe	Merged tribe	Finish
Luís López "Van Dam"; 72, Spain	Retired	Samburu	None	Left Competition; Day 8
Juan Cristóbal Foxley; 36, Santiago de Chile	Lawyer	Samburu	None	1st Voted Out; Day 8
Pedro Marín; 43, Barcelona	Singer	Masai	None	2nd Voted Out; Day 8
Olivier Raynier; 30, Paris	Artist	Samburu	None	Left Competition; Day 13
Mercedes García; 33, Badajoz	Gran Hermano 6 housemate	Samburu	None	Left Competition/3rd Voted Out; Day 13
María Jiménez; 54, Sevilla	Singer	Masai	None	4th Voted Out; Day 15
Sabrina Mahí; 26, Málaga	Gran Hermano 2 winner	Masai	None	5th Voted Out; Day 22
Susana Pérez "Susi"; 36, Spain	Cook	Samburu	None	6th Voted Out; Day 27
Ibai Abajo; 24, Spain	Waiter	Samburu	None	Left Competition; Day 27
Sergio Pazos; 39, Ourense	Actor and reporter	Masai	Merged Tribe	7th Voted Out; Day 29
Milagros Andreu "Mili"; Returned to game		Samburu	Merged Tribe	8th Voted Out; Day 29
María Abradelo; Returned to game		Masai	Merged Tribe	9th Voted Out; Day 36
Rebeca Pous; Returned to game		Masai	Merged Tribe	10th Voted Out; Day 41
Natalia Más; 26, Zaragoza	Model and waitress		Merged Tribe	11th Voted Out; Day 43
José Ramón Villar; 30, Ferrol	Mister Spain 1996	Samburu	Merged Tribe	12th Voted Out; Day 48
Pocholo Martínez-Bordiú; 42, Madrid	Aristocrat		Merged Tribe	13th Voted Out; Day 50
Milagros Andreu "Mili"; 39, Spain	Dancer	Samburu	Merged Tribe	Returned to game Day 43; 14th Voted Out; Day 55
María Abradelo; 35, Castellón	Television host	Masai	Merged Tribe	Returned to game Day 48; 15th Voted Out; Day 57
Rebeca Pous; 30, Barcelona	Singer	Masai	Merged Tribe	Returned to game Day 43; 16th Voted Out; Day 62
Javier Castillejo; 36, Madrid	Boxer	Masai	Merged Tribe	17th Voted Out; Day 64
Raquel Muriel; 26, Spain	Model	Samburu	Merged Tribe	Runner Up; Day 64
Víctor Janeiro; 25, Cádiz	Bullfighter	Masai	Merged Tribe	Sole Survivor; Day 64

== Nominations table ==
	Round 1	Round 2	Round 3	Round 4	Round 5	Round 6	Round 7	Round 8	Round 9	Round 10	Round 11	Round 12	Round 13	Round 14	Round 15	Round 16	Round 17	Final
Víctor	Immune	Sabrina	Immune	Rebeca	Sabrina	Ibai	Sergio	Mili	Pocholo	Rebeca	Natalia	José Ramón	Pocholo	Mili	María A.	Rebeca	Finalist	Sole Survivor (Day 64)
Raquel	Foxley	Immune	Olivier	Immune	Immune	Ibai	Natalia	María	Pocholo	Pocholo	Natalia	José Ramón	Pocholo	Mili	María A.	Rebeca	Nominated	Runner-Up (Day 64)
Javier	Immune	María J.	Immune	María J.	Sabrina	Raquel	Sergio	Pocholo	Pocholo	Pocholo	Natalia	Pocholo	Pocholo	Mili	María A.	Rebeca	Nominated	Eliminated (Day 64)
Rebeca	Immune	Pedro	Immune	María J.	Sergio	Ibai	Raquel	Pocholo	Pocholo	Pocholo	Eliminated (Day 41)	Exempt	Pocholo	Mili	Raquel	Raquel	Eliminated (Day 62)	
María A.	Immune	Pedro	Immune	María J.	Sergio	Raquel	Raquel	Pocholo	Pocholo	Eliminated (Day 36)			Exempt	Raquel	Víctor	Eliminated (Day 57)		
Mili	Foxley	Immune	Olivier	Immune	Immune	Ibai	Pocholo	Javier	Eliminated (Day 29)			Exempt	Pocholo	Rebeca	Eliminated (Day 55)			
Pocholo	Not in game					Exempt	Mili	Mili	Rebeca	Rebeca	Raquel	José Ramón	Víctor	Eliminated (Day 50)				
José Ramón	Not in game		Exempt	Immune	Immune	Ibai	Rebeca	Mili	Pocholo	Rebeca	Pocholo	Raquel	Eliminated (Day 48)					
Natalia	Not in game					Exempt	Rebeca	María A.	María A.	Rebeca	Raquel	Eliminated (Day 43)						
Sergio	Immune	Sabrina	Immune	María J.	Sabrina	Ibai	Raquel	Eliminated (Day 29)										
Ibai	Foxley	Immune	Mercedes	Immune	Immune	Susi	Left Competition (Day 27)											
Susi	Foxley	Immune	Olivier	Immune	Immune	Ibai	Eliminated (Day 27)											
Sabrina	Immune	Pedro	Immune	María A.	Sergio	Eliminated (Day 22)												
María J.	Immune	María A.	Immune	Rebeca	Eliminated (Day 15)													
Mercedes	Foxley	Immune	Olivier	Left Competition (Day 13)														
Olivier	Foxley	Immune	Mercedes	Left Competition (Day 13)														
Pedro	Immune	María A.	Eliminated (Day 8)															
Foxley	Mili	Eliminated (Day 8)																
Van Dam	Foxley	Left Competition (Day 8)																
Nomination Notes	See note 1	See note 2	See note 3, 4, 5	See note 6	See note 7	See note 8, 9	None					See note 10	See note 11	None			See note 12	See note 13
Nominated by Tribe	Foxley	Pedro	Olivier	María J.	Sergio	Ibai	Sergio	Mili	Pocholo	Rebeca	Natalia	José Ramón	Pocholo	Mili	María A.	Rebeca		
Nominated by 1st nominee	Mili	Sergio	Mercedes	Rebeca	Sabrina	Susi	Raquel	Javier	María A.	Pocholo	Raquel	Raquel	Víctor	Rebeca	Raquel	Raquel		
Nominated	Foxley; Mili	Pedro; Sergio	Mercedes; Olivier	María J. Rebeca	Sabrina; Sergio	Ibai; Susi	Raquel; Sergio	Javier; Mili	María A. Pocholo	Pocholo; Rebeca	Natalia; Raquel	José Ramón; Raquel	Pocholo; Víctor	Mili; Rebeca	María A. Raquel	Raquel; Rebeca	Javier; Raquel	Raquel; Víctor
Eliminated	Foxley; 69% to eliminate	Pedro; 71% to eliminate	Eviction; Canceled	María J. 55% to eliminate	Sabrina; 52% to eliminate	Susi; 73.1% to eliminate	Sergio; 96% to eliminate	Mili; 59% to eliminate	María A. 75.9% to eliminate	Rebeca; 51% to eliminate	Natalia; 59% to eliminate	José Ramón; 56% to eliminate	Pocholo; 51% to eliminate	Mili; 52% to eliminate	María A. 81.4% to eliminate	Rebeca; 51% to eliminate	Javier; 34.8% to save	Raquel; 40.8% to win
Eliminated	Foxley; 69% to eliminate	Pedro; 71% to eliminate	Eviction; Canceled	María J. 55% to eliminate	Sabrina; 52% to eliminate	Susi; 73.1% to eliminate	Sergio; 96% to eliminate	Mili; 59% to eliminate	María A. 75.9% to eliminate	Rebeca; 51% to eliminate	Natalia; 59% to eliminate	José Ramón; 56% to eliminate	Pocholo; 51% to eliminate	Mili; 52% to eliminate	María A. 81.4% to eliminate	Rebeca; 51% to eliminate	Javier; 34.8% to save	Víctor; 59.2% to win

- ^Note 1: The contestants were split in two tribes, Masai and Samburu. Masai tribe won the immunity challenge.
- ^Note 2: Samburu tribe won the immunity challenge.
- ^Note 3: Masai tribe won the immunity challenge.
- ^Note 4: The eviction was cancelled because Olivier before closing the lines, left the game. Mercedes was supposed to be evicted with 71% of the votes but as the eviction was cancelled she wasn't evicted. But as she knew the results, she decided to leave the game.
- ^Note 5: José Ramón was exempt from nominations as he is a new contestant.
- ^Note 6: Samburu tribe won the immunity challenge.
- ^Note 7: Samburu tribe won the immunity challenge.
- ^Note 8: The two tribes merged in just one tribe.
- ^Note 9: Natalia and Pocholo were exempt from nominations as they are new contestants.
- ^Note 10: Mili and Rebeca re-entered to the game.
- ^Note 11: María Abradelo re-entered to the game.
- ^Note 12: Víctor won the immunity challenge and because of that he was the first finalist.
- ^Note 13: The lines were open to vote for the winner.
