= Anelka =

Anelka is a surname. Notable people with the surname include:

- Barbara Anelka Tausia (born 1977), Belgian choreographer and dancer, wife of Nicolas
- Claude Anelka (born 1968), French football manager, brother of Nicolas
- Nicolas Anelka (born 1979), French footballer and manager
