= Joan Lui (album) =

1985 soundtrack album by Adriano Celentano

Studio album by Adriano Celentano
- Released: 1985
- Label: Clan
- Producer: Miki Del Prete

Adriano Celentano chronology
I miei americani... (1984)	Joan Lui (1985)	I miei americani... 2 (1986)

Professional ratings
Review scores
Source	Rating
AllMusic	2/5 stars

Joan Lui is a soundtrack album by Italian singer Adriano Celentano, released in 1985 on his label Clan. It includes the musical score of the Celentano's film of the same title.

== Overview ==
Celentano performs most of the songs, except for "Sex Without Love", performed by Rita Rusic, and "La prima stella", performed by Claudia Mori. Differently from the relevant film, the album was a commercial success, selling about 500,000 copies. La Repubblica music critic Gino Castaldo paired the album to the rock opera Jesus Christ Superstar, with Celentano "giving vent to his more moralistic side [...] like a modern-day Savonarola".

== Track listing ==
No.	Title	Writer(s)	Length
1.	"L'uomo perfetto"	Adriano Celentano, Giuseppe Pirazzoli, Ronnie Jackson	4:58
2.	"Sex Without Love"	Paolo Steffan, Celentano, Pirazzoli, Jackson	3:04
3.	"Il tempio"	Celentano	5:43
4.	"Mistero"	Celentano, Gino Santercole	6:00
5.	"Lunedì"	Celentano, Pirazzoli, Jackson	4:43
6.	"Qualcosa nascerà"	Celentano, Pirazzoli, Jackson	6:17
7.	"Splendida e nuda"	Celentano	5:45
8.	"L'ora è giunta"	Celentano, Pirazzoli, Jackson	8:19
9.	"La prima stella"	Celentano, Pirazzoli, Jackson	4:16

== Charts ==
Chart (1985–1986)	Peak position
Italy (Musica e dischi)	4
