= List of number-one hits of 1981 (Italy) =

This is a list of number-one songs in 1981 on the Italian charts compiled weekly by the Italian Hit Parade Singles Chart.

== Chart history ==
Issue date	Song	Artist(s)	Ref.
January 3	"Anna dai capelli rossi" （Anne of Green Gables）	I Ragazzi dai Capelli Rossi	
January 10	"Anna dai capelli rossi" （Anne of Green Gables）	I Ragazzi dai Capelli Rossi	
January 17	"Anna dai capelli rossi" （Anne of Green Gables）	I Ragazzi dai Capelli Rossi	
January 24	"Anna dai capelli rossi" （Anne of Green Gables）	I Ragazzi dai Capelli Rossi	
January 31	"Anna dai capelli rossi" （Anne of Green Gables）	I Ragazzi dai Capelli Rossi	
February 7	"Anna dai capelli rossi" （Anne of Green Gables）	I Ragazzi dai Capelli Rossi	
February 14	"Anna dai capelli rossi" （Anne of Green Gables）	I Ragazzi dai Capelli Rossi	
February 21	"Anna dai capelli rossi" （Anne of Green Gables）	I Ragazzi dai Capelli Rossi	
February 28	"Woman in Love"	Barbra Streisand	
March 7	"Woman in Love"	Barbra Streisand	
March 14	"Woman in Love"	Barbra Streisand	
March 21	"Maledetta primavera"	Loretta Goggi	
March 28	"Sarà perché ti amo"	Ricchi e Poveri	
April 4	"Gioca jouer"	Claudio Cecchetto	
April 11	"Gioca jouer"	Claudio Cecchetto	
April 18	"Sarà perché ti amo"	Ricchi e Poveri	
April 25	"Sarà perché ti amo"	Ricchi e Poveri	
May 2	"Sarà perché ti amo"	Ricchi e Poveri	
May 9	"Sarà perché ti amo"	Ricchi e Poveri	
May 16	"Sarà perché ti amo"	Ricchi e Poveri	
May 23	"Sarà perché ti amo"	Ricchi e Poveri	
May 30	"Sarà perché ti amo"	Ricchi e Poveri	
June 6	"Sarà perché ti amo"	Ricchi e Poveri	
June 13	"Sarà perché ti amo"	Ricchi e Poveri	
June 20	"Amoureux solitaires"	Lio	
June 27	"Amoureux solitaires"	Lio	
July 4	"Enola Gay"	OMD	
July 11	"Enola Gay"	OMD	
July 18	"Enola Gay"	OMD	
July 25	"Enola Gay"	OMD	
August 1	"Enola Gay"	OMD	
August 8	"Enola Gay"	OMD	
August 15	"Out Here on My Own"	Nikka Costa	
August 22	"Out Here on My Own"	Nikka Costa	
August 29	"Out Here on My Own"	Nikka Costa	
September 5	"Out Here on My Own"	Nikka Costa	
September 12	"Out Here on My Own"	Nikka Costa	
September 19	"Out Here on My Own"	Nikka Costa	
September 26	"Out Here on My Own"	Nikka Costa	
October 3	"Out Here on My Own"	Nikka Costa	
October 10	"Out Here on My Own"	Nikka Costa	
October 17	"Out Here on My Own"	Nikka Costa	
October 24	"Out Here on My Own"	Nikka Costa	
October 31	"Out Here on My Own"	Nikka Costa	
November 7	"Out Here on My Own"	Nikka Costa	
November 14	"Out Here on My Own"	Nikka Costa	
November 21	"Bette Davis Eyes"	Kim Carnes	
November 28	"Bette Davis Eyes"	Kim Carnes	
December 5	"Bette Davis Eyes"	Kim Carnes	
December 12	"Cicale"	Heather Parisi	
December 19	"Cicale"	Heather Parisi	
December 26	"Cicale"	Heather Parisi	

== Number-one artists ==
Position	Artist	Weeks #1
1	Nikka Costa	14
2	Ricchi e Poveri	10
3	I Ragazzi Dai Capelli Rossi	8
4	OMD	6
5	Barbra Streisand	3
5	Heather Parisi	3
5	Kim Carnes	3
6	Claudio Cecchetto	2
6	Lio	2
7	Loretta Goggi	1
