= José María Íñigo =

Spanish journalist and television presenter

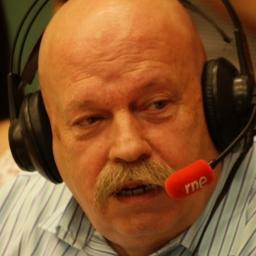
- Born: José María Íñigo Gómez; 4 June 1942; Bilbao, Spain
- Died: 5 May 2018 (aged 75); Madrid, Spain
- Occupations: Actor, radio presenter, television presenter
- Employer: RTVE
- Spouse(s): María del Pilar Piniella Merino (1984–2018); Josette Nahmias (divorced)
- Children: 4
- Website: www.josemariainigo.com

José María Íñigo Gómez (4 June 1942 – 5 May 2018) was a Spanish journalist, radio and television presenter, and stage and screen actor.

== Biography ==
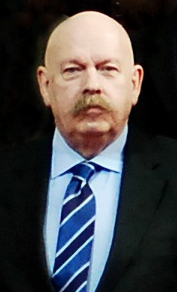
Íñigo in 2012

=== Career ===
Born in Bilbao, Íñigo began his professional career in his hometown as he was hired by Radio Bilbao, and then by COPE. Shortly after he moved to London, from where he collaborated with different music programmes on Cadena SER. Back to Spain, he settled in Madrid, where he worked in radio music shows El Musiquero, El Gran Musical and Los 40 Principales.

He joined Televisión Española (TVE) in 1968 working in the show Último grito, created by Pedro Olea. Later he presented music programme Ritmo 70, directed by Pilar Miró. He became one of the most popular television presenters in Spain with the show Estudio abierto which he hosted from 1972 until 1975 and again from 1984 until 1985. Between 1975 and 1984 he presented other shows with a similar format, which included musical performances and interviews to celebrities or common people with curious stories: Directísimo, Esta noche...fiesta, and Fantástico.

After a hiatus, in 1993 and 1994 Íñigo hosted the morning show on Telecinco alongside Laura Valenzuela. Since then, he worked for several variety shows, talk shows and reality shows on both public and private broadcasters. Since 2000 he also worked for Radio Nacional de España (RNE).

==== Eurovision Song Contest ====
Over the years Íñigo has been associated with the Eurovision Song Contest. Between the 1975 Contest and 1976 Contest he announced the Spanish jury result. In 2008 his testimony for a Spanish documentary was used to claim that at the 1968 Contest the voting had been rigged by Spanish dictator Francisco Franco and that the United Kingdom should have won the contest, although he later clarified that he had just repeated a widespread rumour and that his words had been taken out of context. Between the 2011 Contest and the 2017 Contest, he provided the TVE commentary. Íñigo was joined by Julia Varela from the 2015 Contest.

=== Personal life ===
In 1970 he married painter and model designer Josette Nahmias in Santo Cristo de El Pardo chapel. On 17 December 1984, he married María del Pilar Piniella by civil marriage at the Registro Civil of Barcelona.

=== Death ===
Íñigo died in Madrid aged 75 on 5 May 2018, just before the first semi-final of the Eurovision Song Contest 2018 on 8 May. The last night, Íñigo told Pepa Fernández he did not have any strength, and died in his sleep. It was then when his widow revealed that he had been diagnosed with cancer two years earlier, but he kept working until the last day. His chapelle ardente was installed the same day in Tanatorio de La Paz. His death has been linked to mesothelioma, a lung cancer caused by asbestos. In Íñigo's case, it was caused by the soundproofing in the Studio 1 of Prado del Rey. RTVE and the Spanish Social security deny the link.

== Career on television ==
- Último grito (1968–1969) on TVE.
- Ritmo 70 (1970) on TVE.
- Estudio abierto (1972-1975, 1984-1985) on TVE.
- Hoy 14,15 (1974–1975) on TVE.
- Directísimo (1975–1976) on TVE.
- Spanish spokesperson in the Eurovision Song Contest (1975-1976).
- Esta noche...fiesta (1976-1977) on TVE.
- Estudio 2 (1970s), Telemundo, San Juan, Puerto Rico
- Fantástico (1978–1981) on TVE.
- Íñigo en directo (1986) on ETB.
- Las Mañanas de Telecinco (1993-1994) on Telecinco.
- ¿De qué parte estás? (1994–1995) on Telecinco.
- El Show de Flo (2002–2003) on TVE, co-host.
- Vivo cantando (2003) on Telecinco, co-host.
- Carta de ajuste (2004) on TVE.
- Supervivientes: Perdidos en el Caribe (2006) on Telecinco, co-host.
- El Club de Flo (2006) on laSexta, contestant.
- Destino Oslo, La Gala de Eurovisión 2010 on TVE, jury member.
- Spanish commentary for the Eurovision Song Contest (2011–2017), on TVE.
- Así nos va (2013) on laSexta, section co-host.
- ¡Qué tiempo tan feliz! (2014-2017) on Telecinco, panelist.
- Aquí la Tierra (2017–2018) on TVE, panelist.
- Hora punta (2017–2018) on TVE, panelist.
