= Supervivientes: Perdidos en el Caribe (2006) =

- Presented by: Jesús Vázquez
- No. of days: 71
- No. of castaways: 13
- Winner: Carmen Russo
- Runner-up: Verónica Romero
- Location: Samaná, Dominican Republic
- No. of episodes: 11

Release
- Original network: Telecinco
- Original release: May 2 – July 11, 2006

Season chronology
- ← Previous; Aventura en África Next → Perdidos en Honduras

Supervivientes: Perdidos en el Caribe is the fifth season of the show La Isla de los FamoS.O.S. and the seventh overall season of Supervivientes to air in Spain. After several years on Antena 3, the Spanish version of Survivor returned to Telecinco in 2006.

Despite the change in networks, the show's format remained virtually unchanged. For this season thirteen castaways were stranded on an island in Santo Domingo (Dominican Republic). Jesús Vázquez (in studio) and José María Íñigo (from the island) were the hosts for this season. The show began airing on May 2, 2006 and finished on July 11, 2006 after 70 days.

A new twist was added to the mechanics of competition: the castaway kicked out of the week received the opportunity to live in solitude on "The Last Beach", unknown to the contestants left in the competition, where they would fight to return to the competition. Ultimately, it was Carmen Russo, who was initially the second contestant to be eliminated from the competition, who won the season over Verónica Romero and Jesús de Manuel.

== Finishing order ==
Contestant	Famous For	Finish
Marlène Mourreau; 37, Paris	Vedette	1st Voted Out; Day 1
Esmeralda Marugán; 45, Segovia	Journalist	3rd Voted Out; Day 15
Pepe da Rosa Jr. 39, Sevilla	Comedian	4th Voted Out; Day 22
José Luis Luna; 33, Madrid	Former footballer	5th Voted Out; Day 29
Pipi Estrada; 52, Gijón	Sports journalist	6th Voted Out; Day 36
Ángel Herrero; 65, Madrid	Pepe Herrero's father	7th Voted Out; Day 43
Marta Valverde; 43, Valladolid	Actress	8th Voted Out; Day 50
Verónica Hidalgo; 24, Gerona	Miss Spain 2005	9th Voted Out; Day 57
Aída Yéspica; 23, Caracas	Model	10th Voted Out; Day 64
Jordi Roselló; 28, Barcelona	Model	11th Voted Out; Day 64
Jesús de Manuel; 24, Ciudad Real	Operación Triunfo 4 contestant	Third Place; Day 71
Verónica Romero; 28, Alicante	Operacion Triunfo 1 contestant	Runner-Up; Day 71
Carmen Russo; 45, Genova	Vedette and actress	Sole Survivor; Day 71

== Nominations table ==
	Week 1		Week 2	Week 3	Week 4	Week 5	Week 6	Week 7	Week 8	Week 9		Final	Total votes
Carmen	Marlène	Nominated	Last Beach								Nominated	Sole Survivor (Day 71)	1
Verónica R.	Marlène	No; Nominations	Esmeralda	Verónica H.	Verónica H.	Aída	Marta	Marta	Verónica H.	Aída	Nominated	Runner-Up (Day 71)	6
Jesús	Marlène	No; Nominations	Aída	Marta	Marta	Marta	Marta	Verónica R.	Verónica R.	Verónica R.	Nominated	Third Place (Day 71)	4
Jordi	Marlène	No; Nominations	Aída	Aída	Verónica H.	Pipi	Ángel	Marta	Verónica H.	Aída	Nominated	Eliminated (Day 64)	0
Aída	Verónica H.	No; Nominations	Verónica H.	Jesús	Luna	Ángel	Jesús	Verónica R.	Verónica R.	Verónica R.	Eliminated (Day 64)		14
Verónica H.	Marlène	Nominated	Aída	Marta	Marta	Marta	Marta	Verónica R.	Verónica R.	Eliminated (Day 57)			10
Marta	Marlène	No; Nominations	Aída	Jesús	Verónica H.	Pipi	Jesús	Verónica H.	Eliminated (Day 50)				16
Ángel	Marlène	No; Nominations	Aída	Marta	Verónica H.	Marta	Marta	Eliminated (Day 43)					1
Pipi	Marlène	No; Nominations	Aída	Pepe	Verónica H.	Marta	Eliminated (Day 36)						1
Luna	Marlène	No; Nominations	Aída	Pepe	Marta	Eliminated (Day 29)							0
Pepe	Marlène	No; Nominations	Aída	Aída	Eliminated (Day 22)								1
Esmeralda	Marlène	No; Nominations	Aída	Eliminated (Day 15)									0
Marlène	Carmen	Eliminated (Day 1)											11
Nomination Notes	See note 1	See note 2	See note 3	See note 4	See note 5	See note 6	See note 7	See note 8	See note 9	See note 10	See note 11	See note 12	
Nominated by Tribe			Aída	Marta	Verónica H.	Marta	Marta	Marta	Verónica R.	Aída			
Nominated by Leader			Esmeralda	Pepe	Luna	Pipi	Ángel	Verónica R.	Verónica H.	Verónica R.			
Nominated	Carmen; Marlène; Verónica H.	Carmen; Verónica H.	Aída; Esmeralda	Marta; Pepe	Luna; Verónica H.	Marta; Pipi	Ángel; Marta	Marta; Verónica R.	Verónica H. Verónica R.	Aída; Verónica R.	Carmen; Jesús; Jordi; Verónica R.	Carmen; Jesús; Verónica R.	
Eliminated	Marlène; 39.5% to eliminate	Carmen; 50.5% to move	Esmeralda; 59.8% to eliminate	Pepe; 61.6% to eliminate	Luna; 55.8% to eliminate	Pipi; 50.3% to move	Ángel; 54.5% to eliminate	Marta; 86.9% to move	Verónica H. 88% to eliminate	Aída; 89.8% to eliminate	Jordi; Fewest votes to save	Jesús; Fewest votes (Out of 3)	
Eliminated	Marlène; 39.5% to eliminate	Carmen; 50.5% to move	Esmeralda; 59.8% to eliminate	Pepe; 61.6% to eliminate	Luna; 55.8% to eliminate	Pipi; 50.3% to move	Ángel; 54.5% to eliminate	Marta; 86.9% to move	Verónica H. 88% to eliminate	Aída; 89.8% to eliminate	Jordi; Fewest votes to save	Verónica R. 44.4% to win	
Eliminated	Marlène; 39.5% to eliminate	Carmen; 50.5% to move	Esmeralda; 59.8% to eliminate	Pepe; 61.6% to eliminate	Luna; 55.8% to eliminate	Pipi; 50.3% to move	Ángel; 54.5% to eliminate	Marta; 86.9% to move	Verónica H. 88% to eliminate	Aída; 89.8% to eliminate	Jordi; Fewest votes to save	Carmen; 55.6% to win	
Last Beach Nominated						Carmen; Pipi		Carmen; Marta					
Last Beach Eliminated						Pipi; 30% to save		Marta; 42% to save					

- ^Note 1: At the launch day the survivors nominated. Carmen, Marlène and Verónica H. were nominated. A one-hour public vote was open and Marlène was eliminated. Marlène decided to not stay in The Last Beach.
- ^Note 2: Carmen and Verónica H. survived the first elimination, for this reason they were automatically nominated. Carmen was evicted but she decided to stay in The Last Beach.
- ^Note 3: As the winner of the immunity challenge, Verónica R. was given the power to name a second nominee. Esmeralda decided to not stay in The Last Beach.
- ^Note 4: As the winner of the immunity challenge, Luna was given the power to name a second nominee. Pepe decided to not stay in The Last Beach.
- ^Note 5: As the winner of the immunity challenge, Aída was given the power to name a second nominee. Luna decided to not stay in The Last Beach.
- ^Note 6: As the winner of the immunity challenge, Jordi was given the power to name a second nominee. Pipi decided to stay in The Last Beach and the public voted to save between Carmen and Pipi.
- ^Note 7: As the winner of the immunity challenge, Jordi was given the power to name a second nominee. Ángel decided to not stay in The Last Beach.
- ^Note 8: As the winner of the immunity challenge, Jesús was given the power to name a second nominee. Marta decided to stay in The Last Beach and the public voted to save between Carmen and Marta.
- ^Note 9: As the winner of the immunity challenge, Jordi was given the power to name a second nominee. Verónica H. decided to not stay in The Last Beach.
- ^Note 10: As the winner of the immunity challenge, Jesús was given the power to name a second nominee. Aída was eliminated and she decided to not stay in The Last Beach.
- ^Note 11: After Aída's elimination, Carmen joined to the survivors and a public vote was open to evict one of them.
- ^Note 12: At this round the public was voting to choose the winner of this season.
