= Ten Paciencia =

Single by Thalía

from the album Lunada
- Released: May 8, 2008
- Recorded: 2008
- Genre: Cumbia, vallenato, electronica
- Length: 3:30
- Label: EMI Latin
- Songwriters: Descemer Bueno; Magilee Alvarez; Cynthia Salazar
- Producer: Emilio Estefan

Thalía singles chronology
"No, No, No" (2006)	"Ten Paciencia" (2008)	"Será porque te amo" (2008)

"Ten Paciencia" (English: "Have Patience") is a song recorded by Mexican singer Thalía for her eleventh studio album Lunada. It was written by Descemer Bueno, Magilee Alvarez and Cynthia Salazar, and it was produced by Emilio Estefan. The song was released as the lead single from Lunada on May 8, 2008, by EMI Latin, after being chosen by her fans through a poll on the internet, overcoming "Sangre Caliente" in votes.

== Background ==
According to Thalía, the song "is a sound that suddenly makes you jump out of your skin, a sound that makes you ask, 'Hmm, what is it? pop?' It includes an accordion but suddenly brings in a little bit of Latin sound. What is it? It is a song that also has very good, sensual and bold lyrics. It's intended to make people dance".

== Remixes ==
A reggaeton remix of "Ten Paciencia" featuring Daddy Yankee was also released. This new version was premiered on 29 July in radios and the collaboration was made in order to help "Ten Paciencia"'s performance in charts. On 25 August 2008, a new remix released on radios produced by the reggaeton duo from Puerto Rico Zion & Lennox.

== Music video ==
The video was officially released on 13 June 2008 in Mexico. The video was also directed by Emilio Estefan. It features Thalía at the beach dancing with her dancers under the influence of the moon. Thalía wanted to capture the idea of the perfect summer's night party on the beach. The night shoot took place at South Beach's beach club, Nikki Beach. Thalía wore a green bikini top covered by an embroidered vintage caftan, dancing and singing in the tropical environment that included candle-lit cabanas, fire eaters and over 100 extras.

== Live performances ==
Thalia performed live "Ten Paciencia" during 2008 Premios Juventud awards in which she was honored with the "Diva award". Thalia also performed this song at El Show de Cristina.

== Track listing ==
Official versions

1. "Ten Paciencia" (Album version) – 3:32
2. "Ten Paciencia" (Pop version) - 3:30
3. "Ten Paciencia" (Reggaetón Remix) feat. Daddy Yankee - 3:26
4. "Ten Paciencia" (Remix) feat. Zion and Lennox - 3:39

== Chart performance ==
Chart (2008)	Peak position
US Hot Latin Songs (Billboard)	39
US Latin Pop Airplay (Billboard)	24
US Latin Tropical Airplay (Billboard)	25
Venezuela (Record Report)	105
