= Lunada =

Studio album by Thalía
- Released: 24 June 2008
- Recorded: 2008
- Genre: Latin pop
- Length: 39:03
- Language: Spanish
- Label: EMI Latin
- Producer: Emilio Estefan

Thalía chronology
El Sexto Sentido (2005)	Lunada (2008)	Primera Fila (2009)

Singles from Lunada
- 1. "Ten Paciencia" Released: 7 May 2008; 2. "Será Porque Te Amo" Released: 21 July 2008

Lunada (English: Moonlight Party) is the eleventh studio album by Mexican recording artist Thalía. It was released through EMI Latin on 24 June 2008 worldwide. Lunada is Thalía's first album since the release of the successful El Sexto Sentido in 2005 and since the birth of her first child. It was produced by the hit-maker Emilio Estefan and was described by Thalía as an album to "enjoy the summer". The album received generally favorable reviews.

Two singles were released from this album. The first one was "Ten Paciencia", while the second one was "Será Porque Te Amo". Due to personal issues and treatment from her Lyme disease, Thalía canceled all remaining promotion for the album. Due to this, it did not reach the expected sales by her record company (around 250,000 copies sold worldwide). For this reason, she ended her contract with EMI after a 14-year history with the label.

== Background and development ==
The album's idea came when Thalía was pregnant with her first daughter, Sabrina Sakaë. The singer was anxious to put on her bikini and go to the beach, as she could not do some things, such as being exposed to the sun. "When I started making this album, I was at the middle of my pregnancy, and I had only one thought: the summer. My desire was to come back to the beach and enjoy the summer's temperature. With a wood fire, surrounded by friends, listening to music under the moonlight; a true lunar". During a press conference on 17 June 2008 in New York City, where Thalía stated:

"This album came along when I was very pregnant with my daughter. I was almost eight months pregnant. I had had it, and the only thing I could think about were bikinis, suntan lotion, beer and the beach. So I began to think to myself, 'Hey! What was that song I liked last summer in Argentina? 'Sangre Caliente' ("Hot blood")! And when I went with my friends to (the Mexican beach resort of) Ixtapa, which one was it? That's right! The one by Juan Gabriel!' ... That's how 'Lunada' was born".

Production for Lunada began in 2007, after the birth of Thalía's daughter. The singer said that the album was very easy to make and its production was also pleasant and easy. It was recorded in Miami at the Crescent Moon Studios with Emilio Estefan in only three days. She opted to record cover versions of songs from the 1980s and 1990s as they reminded her of her teen days, along with new tracks. Thalía also revealed that her daughter "has accompanied me through the whole process; she's part of the album. That's why I wrote a song for my daughter. It's the song 'Bendita' and it's not a traditional lullaby. In my case I wanted to add reggae. All I feel for this human being that has come into my life I say in 'Bendita'".

== Reception ==
Professional ratings
Review scores
Source	Rating
AllMusic	3/5 stars

Jason Birchmeier from AllMusic gave the album a mixed review, saying, "While Lunada unfortunately isn't a return to the glory days of Amor a la Mexicana (1997), it's an entertaining album with a few great songs. Lunada is entertaining from a stylistic standpoint above all. [...] The lead single, "Ten Paciencia," gets the album off a great start, [...] but the remainder of the album is less impressive. [...] Some of these latter songs work well, others not so well for one reason or another, but either way, they're entertaining from a stylistic standpoint. In the end, Lunada is helped by the frontloaded highlights and the short running time (less than 40 minutes). Longtime fans of Thalía who expect Lunada to rival her late-'90s output are sure to be disappointed. A closer comparison would be to Thalía's last album with Estefan (Thalía, 2002) or her 2005 album with songwriter/producer Estéfano, El Sexto Sentido".

In Thalía's native Mexico, Lunada debuted at number eight, before descending and falling out of the chart eight weeks later. On the US Top Latin Albums, the album debuted at its peak of number 10 on 12 July 2008, before falling to number 34 the week after. On the Latin Pop Albums chart, it debuted at number four, and fell out of the chart at number 11 two weeks later. As of December 2009, Lunada has sold 14,000 copies in the United States and Puerto Rico, according to Nielsen SoundScan. With 250,000 copies sold worldwide it became Thalía's worst-selling studio album at the time.

== Disease and departure from EMI ==
In 2008, Thalía was affected by Lyme disease, a disease that put her health into serious danger, which prevented her from promoting Lunada. This lack of promotion resulted on her departure from EMI after a 14-year history with the label. Despite the fact the album was not the success everyone expected, Thalía declared that she is proud of this production and the material included on this album. As a matter of fact, a big part of the press in her native Mexico mentioned that she would have to retire from music, at least until fully recovered. She signed a contract with Sony Music Entertainment in 2009, and it was announced that she would record an album in acoustic format as her first official release under her new label, Sony Music Latin.

== Controversy ==
The cover art to Lunada was compared to that of Australian band Cut Copy's album Bright Like Neon Love (2004). Both show strong similarities, including the same color to the face, similar glasses and lipstick color and overall appearance. Thalía responded that "when the creative team introduced me to the different concepts I was absolutely inspired with an image they showed me." She added, "We are all inspired by everybody and everything inspired by everything. The tropical flavor and the colors and style that reflect my idea of what a lunar is, which is represented on the artwork of my album. I am sure that this cover will also inspire others as a reference in the future".

== Track listing ==
No.	Title	Writer(s)	Producer(s)	Length
1.	"Ten Paciencia"	Descemer Bueno; Magilee Álvarez; Cynthia Salazar	Emilio Estefan	3:30
2.	"Sangre Caliente"	Marcelo Delgado; Darío Húngaro	Estefan	4:15
3.	"Será Porque Te Amo"	Dario Farina; Daniele Pace; Luis Gómez-Escolar; Enzo Ghinazzi	Estefan	2:41
4.	"Con Este Amor"	Ximena Muñoz; Max Di Carlo	Estefan	2:59
5.	"Bendita"	Thalía Sodi	Estefan	3:25
6.	"Desolvidándote"	Sodi; Jodi Mar; Dave Thompson	Estefan	4:11
7.	"Isla Para Dos"	Nano Cabrera; Joselito	Estefan	4:25
8.	"Insensible"	Juan Gabriel	Estefan	2:57
9.	"Aventurero"	Claudia Brant; Jean-Yves Ducarnet; Nubawn	Estefan	3:18
10.	"Yo No Sé Vivir"	Bueno; Álvarez; Salazar	Estefan	4:08
11.	"Sólo Se Vive Una Vez"	Sodi; Drop Dead Beats	Estefan	3:10

Japanese bonus track
No.	Title	Writer(s)	Producer(s)	Length
12.	"La Super Chica"	Lilly Ponce; Chris Rodríguez; Michael Cosculluela	Chris Rodríguez	4:00

== Charts ==
=== Weekly charts ===
Chart (2008)	Peak position
Argentine Albums (CAPIF)	5
Mexican Albums (AMPROFON)	8
US Top Latin Albums (Billboard)	10
US Latin Pop Albums (Billboard)	4

=== Monthly charts ===
Chart (2008)	Peak position
Argentine Albums (CAPIF)	16

== Release history ==
Region	Date	Format	Label	Ref.
United States	24 June 2008	CD	EMI Latin, EMI Televisa Music	
Puerto Rico	24 June 2008	CD	EMI Latin, EMI Televisa Music	
Poland	10 July 2008	CD	EMI Latin, EMI Televisa Music	
Austria	11 July 2008	CD	EMI Latin, EMI Televisa Music	
Germany	11 July 2008	CD	EMI Latin, EMI Televisa Music	
Switzerland	11 July 2008	CD	EMI Latin, EMI Televisa Music	
Spain	15 July 2008	CD	EMI Latin, EMI Televisa Music	
Greece	15 July 2008	CD	EMI Latin, EMI Televisa Music	
Italy	15 July 2008	CD	EMI Latin, EMI Televisa Music	
Japan	23 July 2008	CD	EMI Latin, EMI Televisa Music	
Brazil	24 July 2008	CD	EMI Latin, EMI Televisa Music	
