= Atmosfera =

Studio album by Adriano Celentano
- Released: 1983
- Label: Clan

Adriano Celentano chronology
Uh... uh... (1982)	Atmosfera (1983)	I miei americani (tre puntini) (1984)

Professional ratings
Review scores
Source	Rating
AllMusic	2.5/5 stars

Atmosfera is a studio album by Italian singer Adriano Celentano, released in 1983 on his label Clan.

== Track listing ==
Side 1
No.	Title	Writer(s)	Length
1.	"Atmosfera"	Luciano Beretta, Adriano Celentano, Miki Del Prete	4:24
2.	"Splende la notte"	Beretta, Celentano, Del Prete	5:21
3.	"Prima pagina"	Beretta, Del Prete, Gino Santercole	4:23
4.	"Dipenderà da te"	Beretta, Del Prete, Santercole	3:52

Side 2
No.	Title	Writer(s)	Length
1.	"Sound di verità"	Beretta, Celentano, Del Prete	5:31
2.	"Bel giovane"	Celentano	5:06
3.	"Madonna mia"	Franco Castellano, Giuseppe Moccia, Santercole	3:59
4.	"Cammino"	Celentano	4:03

== Charts ==
Chart (1983)	Peak position
Italy (Musica e dischi)	20
