= Nano Cabrera =

Puerto Rican musician

Nano Cabrera is a singer, guitarist, and composer born in Condado, Puerto Rico, who was a member of Haciendo Punto en Otro Son, the musical group that brought popularity to typical Puerto Rican music during the last quarter century. He was a close friend of Tony Croatto, and is a cousin of golfer Ángel Cabrera.

Cabrera was featured on a very popular, Old Colony soda commercial in Puerto Rico during the early 1980s.

His popular song "Isla Para Dos" was covered by Zizi Possi in 1991 and Thalía on 2008's Lunada.
