= Eu4ya =

Italian Eurodance band

- Origin: Milan, Italy
- Genres: Eurodance
- Years active: 2003–present
- Labels: Tunnel by Dieffe
- Members: Daniele Torrente; Alessandro Franchi; Fabrizio Rugna; Salvatore Cusato; Barbara Tausia

Eu4ya is an Italian Eurodance band from Milan.

== History ==
The band records old songs as dance versions. They covered hits such as "Disco Blu", "Disco Rouge", "Anti-Funk", "Let's Go Dancing", "Everybody Jump", "Blue Monday", "Sarà perché ti amo" and "Na Na Hey Hey Kiss Him Goodbye". The band played mostly live in Canada. In 2007, they released a cover of the song "Tanti auguri" as Eu4ya meets Elissa on the sampler Italo Boot Mix 2007. Eu4ya performed the live version of "Tanti auguri" with Elissa and original performer Raffaella Carrà. Frontwoman Barbara Tausia is the wife of French footballer Nicolas Anelka.

== Discography ==
Singles

- 2003: "Sarà perché ti amo" (Do it Yourself)
- 2004: "Na Na Hey Hey Kiss Him Goodbye" (Do it Yourself)
- 2006: "Tanti auguri" (as Eu4ya meets Elissa) (Tunnel Records)
