= Sanremo Music Festival 1985 =

Italian song contest (35th edition)

Dates and venue
- Semi-final 1: 7 February 1985
- Semi-final 2: 8 February 1985
- Final: 9 February 1985
- Venue: Teatro Ariston; Sanremo, Italy

Organisation
- Broadcaster: Radiotelevisione italiana (RAI)
- Presenters: Pippo Baudo and Patty Brard

Big Artists section
- Number of entries: 22
- Winner: "Se m'innamoro" Ricchi e Poveri

Newcomers' section
- Number of entries: 16
- Winner: "Niente di più" Cinzia Corrado

The Sanremo Music Festival 1985 (Italian: Festival di Sanremo 1985), officially the 35th Italian Song Festival (35º Festival della canzone italiana), was the 35th annual Sanremo Music Festival, held at the Teatro Ariston in Sanremo, Italy, between 7 and 9 February 1985 and broadcast by Radiotelevisione italiana (RAI). The show was hosted by Pippo Baudo, assisted by Patty Brard.

The winner of the Big Artists section was Ricchi e Poveri with the song "Se m'innamoro", while Matia Bazar won the Critics Award with the song "Souvenir". Cinzia Corrado won the Newcomers section with the song "Niente di più".

Claudio Baglioni was invited as a guest to receive the "Italian Song of the Century" award for his hit "Questo piccolo grande amore". The singer-songwriter was the only artist, in this edition dominated by the play-back, to perform live (with the same award-winning song), accompanying himself on the piano alone.

== Participants and results ==
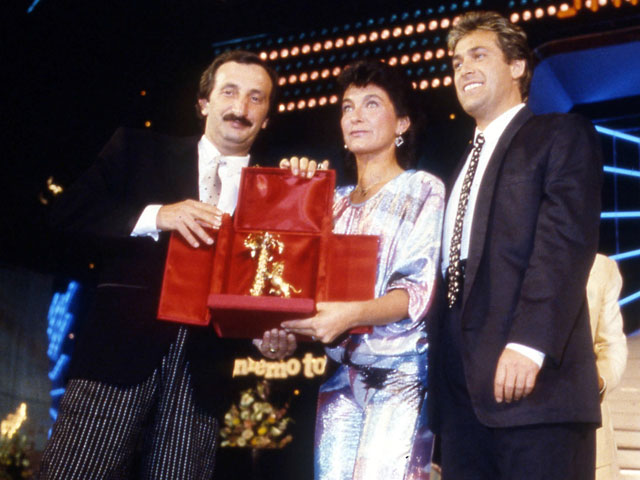
Ricchi e Poveri holding the first prize

=== Big Artists ===
Big Artists section
Song	Artist(s)	Songwriter(s)	Rank
"Se m'innamoro"	Ricchi e Poveri	Dario Farina; Cristiano Minellono	1
"Noi, ragazzi di oggi"	Luis Miguel	Toto Cutugno; Cristiano Minellono	2
"Chiamalo amore"	Gigliola Cinquetti	Dario Farina; Paolo Amerigo Cassella	3
"Sulla buona strada"	Riccardo Fogli	Maurizio Fabrizio; Vincenzo Spampinato	4
"Notte serena"	Christian	Mario Balducci	5
"Una storia importante"	Eros Ramazzotti	Eros Ramazzotti; Piero Cassano; Adelio Cogliati	6
"A lei"	Anna Oxa	Roberto Vecchioni; Mauro Paoluzzi	7
"Il mio angelo"	Fiordaliso	Luigi Albertelli; Enzo Malepasso	8
"E mo' e mo'"	Peppino di Capri	Giuseppe Faiella; Depsa; Franco Fasano	9
"Souvenir"	Matia Bazar	Aldo Stellita; Carlo Marrale; Sergio Cossu	10 / Critics Award
"Tu dimmi un cuore ce l'hai"	Marco Armani	Pietro Armenise; Marco Armani	11
"Fammi volare"	Drupi	Silvio Negroni; Dorina Dato; Drupi	12
"Ritratto"	Franco Simone	Massimo Colombo; Franco Simone	13
"Via con me"	Eduardo De Crescenzo	Claudio Mattone; Daniele Pace	14
"Grande Joe"	Banco del Mutuo Soccorso	Francesco Di Giacomo; Vittorio Nocenzi	15
"Da quando non ci sei"	Dario Baldan Bembo	Dario Baldan Bembo; Antonella Maggio	16
"Franca ti amo"	Ivan Graziani	Ivan Graziani	17
"Vorrei svegliarti"	Eugenio Finardi	Eugenio Finardi; Luca Madonia	18
"Buona fortuna"	Mimmo Locasciulli	Mimmo Locasciulli	19
"Faccia di cane"	New Trolls	Fabrizio De André; Roberto Ferri; Vittorio De Scalzi; Gianni Belleno; Nico Di Palo; Ricky Belloni	20
"Donne"	Zucchero & Randy Jackson Band	Zucchero Fornaciari; Alberto Salerno	21
"Cose veloci"	Garbo	Garbo	22

=== Newcomers ===
Newcomers section
Song	Artist(s)	Songwriter(s)	Rank
"Niente di più"	Cinzia Corrado	Cavaros; P. Mangini	1
"Me ne andrò"	Miani	Miani; Piero Montanari	2
"Innamoratevi come me"	Lena Biolcati	Valerio Negrini; Roby Facchinetti	3
"Bella più di me"	Cristiano De André	Roberto Ferri; Cristiano De André; Franco Mussida	4
"Occhi neri"	Marco Rancati	Rosalino Cellamare	5
"Se ti senti veramente un amico"	Stefano Borgia	Stefano Borgia	6
"A goccia a goccia"	Lanfranco Carnacina	Cashin; Marco Colucci; Lanfranco Carnacina; Daniele Pace; Silvio Testi	7
"Sul mare"	Antonella Ruggiero	Michele Vicino; Daniele Pace; Maurizio Fabrizio	8
"Bella gioventù"	Rodolfo Banchelli	Daniele Pace; Angelo Valsiglio; Rodolfo Banchelli; Oscar Avogadro	Eliminated
"Che amore è"	Claudio Patti	Claudio Patti; Norina Piras	Eliminated
"Firenze, piccoli particolari"	Laura Landi	Gaio Chiocchio; Amedeo Minghi	Eliminated
"Il viaggio"	Mango	Giuseppe Mango	Eliminated
"Lasciamoci andare"	Antonio Valentini	Antonio Valentini	Eliminated
"Luna nuova"	Silvia Conti	Oscar Avogadro; Aldo Tagliapietra	Eliminated
"Saranno i giovani"	Roberto Kunstler	Mimmo Locasciulli; Roberto Kunstler	Eliminated
"Volti nella noia"	Champagne Molotov	Enrico Ruggeri; Luigi Schiavone; Alberto Rocchetti	Eliminated

== Broadcasts ==
=== International broadcasts ===
Known details on the broadcasts in each country, including the specific broadcasting stations and commentators are shown in the tables below.

International broadcasters of the Sanremo Music Festival 1985
Country	Broadcaster	Channel(s)	Commentator(s)	Ref(s)
Chile	TVN (Note: Delayed broadcast on 25 February at 21:30 (CLT))			
Norway	NRK	NRK P1 (Note: Delayed broadcast in a shortened format on 23 April at 23:30 (CEST))	Riva and Fredrik Ravn	
Soviet Union	CT USSR	Programme One (Note: Delayed broadcast in a shortened format on 14 April at 22:05 (MSD))		
United States	SIN	SIN (Note: Delayed broadcast on 29 May at 21:00 (EDT))		
