= Diana Sorbello =

German schlager singer (born 1979)

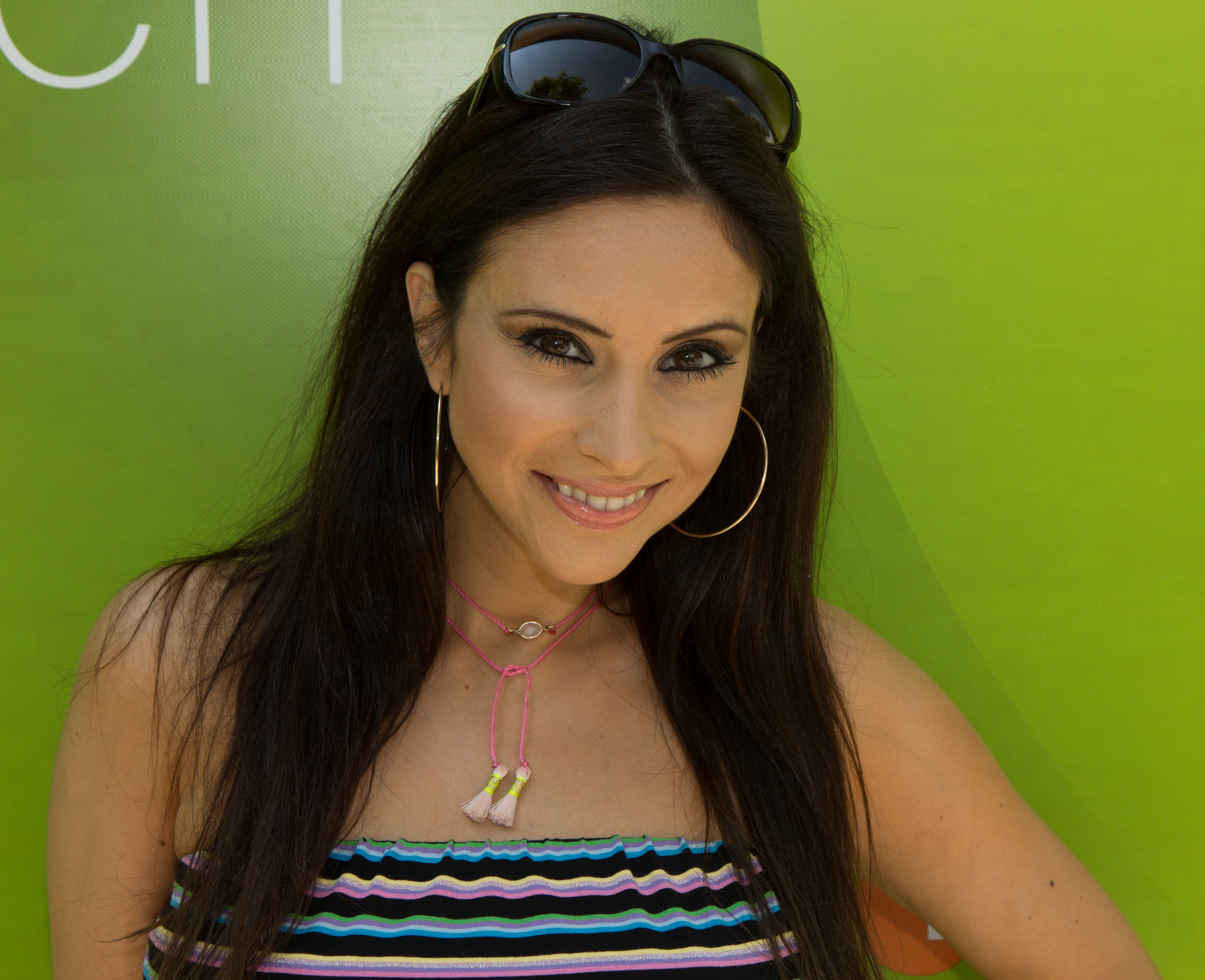
Sorbello in 2018

Diana Sorbello (born 27 June 1979 in Bocholt, North Rhine-Westphalia) is a German schlager singer.

== Biography ==
Diana Sorbello studied sociology, pedagogy and civil rights at the University of Münster from 1998 till 2003.

=== Music career ===
She was "discovered" by a member of the German pop group Wind in 1996. The next year she made her first record contract with Koch International as "Diana". Her debut song was titled "Ich will zurück zu dir". Diana Sorbello's debut album Bittersüß ("Bittersweet") was released in 2006. The opening track "Ich fange nie mehr was an einem Sonntag an" is a cover version of the 1970s hit originally sung by the Swiss schlager singer Monica Morell. That same year, the soccer anthem "Wir schwenken die Fahnen (Schwarz Rot Gold)", was also released. It is a cover version of the Slade hit "My Oh My". In 2008, Diana Sorbello covered the 1980s hit "Sarà perché ti amo", originally interpreted by the Italian pop music group Ricchi e Poveri. The German version is titled "Das ist, weil ich dich liebe".

Since 2001, Diana Sorbello has had about 30–40 live performances annually at various festivities. Her shows - usually about 20–30 minutes long - comprise her own songs as well as famous pop classics.

=== Designer career ===
In 2006, Sorbello designed a fashion collection called "Fußball-Fan-Kollektion" for the German firm KiK. The collection includes the so-called "Fußball-Bikini", "Soccer-bikini".
