= Se m'innamoro =

1985 single by Ricchi e Poveri

Single by Ricchi e Poveri

from the album Dimmi quando
- B-side: "Mami mami"
- Released: February 1985
- Genre: Italo disco
- Length: 3:45
- Label: Baby
- Songwriters: Dario Farina; Cristiano Minellono

Ricchi e Poveri singles chronology
"Hasta la vista" (1984)	"Se m'innamoro" (1985)	"Dimmi quando" (1985)

Music video
- "Se m'innamoro" on YouTube

"Se m'innamoro" ("If I Fall in Love") is an Italian song composed by Cristiano Minellono and Dario Farina, arranged by Fio Zanotti and performed by the Europop group Ricchi e Poveri. The song won the 35th edition of the Sanremo Music Festival.

The group also recorded a Spanish version of the song titled "Si me enamoro".

In 2014 the song was included in the musical score of Carlo Vanzina's film Sapore di te.

== Track listing and formats ==
- Italian 7-inch single

A. "Se m'innamoro" – 3:45
B. "Mami mami" – 3:40

== Charts ==
Weekly chart performance for "Se m'innamoro"
Chart (1985)	Peak position
Italy (Musica e dischi)	6
West Germany (GfK)	70
