= Backseat (band) =

Danish pop rock band

- Origin: Backseat Boys (until 1995)
- Genres: Pop rock
- Years active: As Backseat Boys (1992-1995); Backseat (1995-1999, 2006-present)
- Labels: Kick Music (1992-1996); CMC Records (1996-1999)
- Members: Ivan Pedersen; Søren Jacobsen; Helge Solberg; Henrik Askou; Martin Jønsson
- Past members: Esben Just; Carsten Millner; Lars Krarup; Otto Sidenius; Claus Antonsen; Lars "Mitch" Fischermann; Olle Nyberg
- Website: www.backseat.dk

Backseat Boys leads here. For the professional wrestling tag team that consisted of Johnny Kashmere and Trent Acid, see The Backseat Boyz

Backseat, originally named Backseat Boys, is a Danish pop rock band that was established in 1992 by Ivan Pedersen, a well-established singer and vocalist. The original lineup consisted of Pedersen on lead vocals, Søren Jacobsen on guitars, Helge Solberg on bass, Esben Just on piano/organ, and Carsten Millner on drums.

They debuted as "Backseat Boys" with their debut album Wind Me Up, and they were signed to the record label Kick Music. Guitarist Lars Krarup joined in 1994, and their second album, Long Distance, followed. In 1995, the band's name was shortened to Backseat.

Also in 1995, three of the five members (Søren Jacobsen, Esben Just, and Carsten Millner) left, and two new members, Otto Sidenius (organ) and Claes Antonsen (drums), joined the band. Backseat also changed labels, signing with CMC Records in 1996. More changes came to the lineup as Claus Antonsen, Thomas Helmig, and Otto Sidenius stopped and were replaced by Lars "Mitch" Fischermann (drums) and Olle Nyberg on keyboards. In 1998, the band released Shut Up and Play, an album consisting of cover versions of songs by Bob Seger, Jimi Hendrix, John Hiatt, Sheryl Crow, and more.

Backseat temporarily dissolved in 1999, going on hiatus until reforming in 2006 with original members Ivan Pedersen, Søren Jacobsen, and Helge Solberg, alongside new members Henrik Askou on drums and Martin Jønsson on keyboards. They began touring Denmark in the summer of 2006 and released their first album in nine years, Globalization, in 2007. In 2013, Backseat made a comeback with Seasoned & Served, a major release on Target Distribution which reached #8 on Hitlisten in its first week of release.

== Members ==
Current members

- Ivan Pedersen - vocals (1992–1999, 2006–present)
- Søren Jacobsen - guitar (1992–1995, 2006–present)
- Helge Solberg - bass (1992–1999, 2006–present)
- Henrik Askou - drums (2006–present)
- Martin Jønsson - keyboards (2006–present)

Former members

- Esben Just - organ, piano (1992–1995)
- Carsten Millner - drums (1992–1995)
- Lars Krarup - guitar (1994–1999)
- Otto Sidenius - organ (1995–1996)
- Claus Antonsen - drums (1995–1996)
- Lars "Mitch" Fischermann - drums (1996–1999)
- Olle Nyberg - keyboards (1996–1999)

== Discography ==
=== Albums ===
Year	Album	Chart peak (DEN)	Certification
1992	Wind Me Up	—	
1994	Long Distance	—	
1996	Songs	—	
1998	Shut Up and Play	—	
2007	Globalization	—	
2013	Seasoned & Served	8	
