= Sarà perché ti amo =

1981 single by Ricchi e Poveri

Single by Ricchi e Poveri

from the album ...E penso a te
- Language: Italian
- B-side: "Bello l'amore"
- Released: February 1981
- Genre: Pop, Italo disco
- Label: Baby
- Songwriters: Enzo Ghinazzi; Daniele Pace; Dario Farina

Ricchi e Poveri singles chronology
| "E no, e no" (1980) | "Sarà perché ti amo" (1981) | "M'innamoro di te" (1981) |

"Sarà perché ti amo" (Italian: [saˈra pperˈke tti ˈaːmo]; "It must be because I love you") is a song by Italian pop group Ricchi e Poveri, released in 1981 as the lead single from their ninth studio album, E penso a te. It became one of their biggest hits.

== History ==
The song was released in February 1981 on Baby Records and premiered live at the 31st edition of the Sanremo Festival in 1981. The song featured also on the album E penso a te. The song was included in the musical score of Claude Miller's An Impudent Girl (1985), and in Italy the film was subsequently released as Sarà perché ti amo. They also recorded the song in Spanish with the title "Será porque te amo" with lyrics by Luis Gómez-Escolar. It briefly regained popularity after it was played (and the tifosi sang it) at the F1 2026 Italian Grand Prix after it was won by Italian race driver Andrea Kimi Antonelli, the first Italian to win an Italian Grand Prix in 60 years. The song was once again played at the 2026 Mexico City Grand Prix to celebrate Antonelli winning the World Championship, becoming the youngest world champion and the first Italian since Alberto Ascari 73 years prior.

== Track listing ==
1. "Sarà perché ti amo" – 3:09
2. "Bello l'amore" – 3:21

== Charts ==
=== Weekly charts ===
1981 weekly chart performance for "Sarà perché ti amo"
| Chart (1981) | Peak position |
|---|---|
| Austria (Ö3 Austria Top 40) | 7 |
| Belgium (Ultratop 50 Flanders) | 33 |
| Finland (Suomen virallinen lista) | 29 |
| France (SNEP) | 1 |
| France (IFOP) | 3 |
| Italy (Musica e dischi) | 1 |
| Spain (AFYVE) | 1 |
| Switzerland (Schweizer Hitparade) | 2 |
| West Germany (GfK) | 11 |

2004 weekly chart performance for "Sarà perché ti amo"
| Chart (2004) | Peak position |
|---|---|
| Italy (FIMI) | 15 |

2023–2025 weekly chart performance for "Sarà perché ti amo"
| Chart (2023–2025) | Peak position |
|---|---|
| Austria (Ö3 Austria Top 40) | 19 |
| Czech Republic Singles Digital (ČNS IFPI) | 50 |
| Hungary (Dance Top 40) | 1 |
| Hungary (Rádiós Top 40) | 17 |
| Hungary (Single Top 40) | 6 |
| Slovakia Singles Digital (ČNS IFPI) | 47 |
| Switzerland (Schweizer Hitparade) | 63 |

=== Year-end charts ===
1981 year-end chart performance for "Sarà perché ti amo"
| Chart (1981) | Position |
|---|---|
| Switzerland (Schweizer Hitparade) | 11 |
| West Germany (Official German Charts) | 40 |

2023 year-end chart performance for "Sarà perché ti amo"
| Chart (2023) | Position |
|---|---|
| Austria (Ö3 Austria Top 40) | 24 |
| Hungary (Dance Top 40) | 36 |
| Switzerland (Schweizer Hitparade) | 72 |

2024 year-end chart performance for "Sarà perché ti amo"
| Chart (2024) | Position |
|---|---|
| Hungary (Dance Top 40) | 1 |

2025 year-end chart performance for "Sarà perché ti amo"
| Chart (2025) | Position |
|---|---|
| Hungary (Dance Top 40) | 1 |

== Certifications and sales ==
Certifications and sales for "Sarà perché ti amo"
| Region | Certification | Certified units/sales |
|---|---|---|
| Austria (IFPI Austria) | 2× Platinum | 200,000^{*} |
| Belgium | — | 100,000 |
| France | — | 800,000 |
| Germany (BVMI) | Platinum | 600,000^{‡} |
| Hungary (MAHASZ) | 5× Platinum | 50,000^{‡} |
| Italy | — | 700,000 |
Digital
| Italy (FIMI) since 2009 | Platinum | 100,000^{‡} |
^{*} Sales figures based on certification alone.^{‡} Sales+streaming figures based on certification alone.

== Thalía version ==
"Será porque te amo"

Single by Thalía

from the album Lunada
- Released: 21 July 2008
- Recorded: 2008
- Genre: Latin pop
- Length: 2:41
- Label: EMI Latin
- Songwriters: Dario Farina; Daniele Pace; Luis Gómez-Escolar; Enzo Ghinazzi
- Producer: Emilio Estefan

Thalía singles chronology
| "Ten Paciencia" (2008) | "Será porque te amo" (2008) | "Equivocada" (2009) |

The Spanish cover "Será porque te amo" is the second single from Thalía's studio album Lunada (2008). The song was written by Dario Farina, Daniele Pace, Luis Gómez-Escolar and Enzo Ghinazzi and produced by Emilio Estefan.

"Será porque te amo" was released only as a radio single across Latin America. Despite not having a music video and virtually no promotion, the song became a moderate hit. Also, in some cases managed higher positions at airplays than "Ten paciencia" which was fully promoted.

"Será porque te amo" is Thalía's last official single released by EMI music.

=== Track listing ===
Official Versions

1. "Será porque te amo" (album version) – 2:41

=== Chart performance ===
| Chart (2008) | Peak position |
|---|---|
| Venezuela Record Report | 171 |

== Other cover versions ==
- 1981: Los Abejorros – "Será porque te amo" (Costa Rica)
- 1981: Leena Vanamo - "Sellaista elämä on" (Finland)
- 1982: Perikles – "Var ska vi sova inatt" (Sweden)
- 1982: Laban – "Hvor ska' vi sove i nat" (Denmark)
- 1982: Marja Koski - "Sellaista elämä on" (Finland)
- 1982: Mighty Band – "Var ska vi sova inatt" (Sweden)
- 1983: Los Chicos – "Será porque te amo" (Puerto Rico)
- 1987: Triky a Povery - "Hej, hola, zpívej si sám" (Czechoslovakia)
- 1988: no:Jørgen Slips - "Hvor har jeg sovet i natt?" (Norway)
- 1990: Noriko Ogawa – "Kimagure Stella" (気まぐれ天体) (Japan)
- 1991: Collage – "Je m'envole avec toi" (Canada)
- 2001: Těžkej Pokondr – "Hej, volá, volá Sisa" (Czech Republic)
- 2003: Eu4ya – "Sarà perché ti amo" (remix)
- 2003: Maïwenn feat. Cécile de France – "Sarà perché ti amo" (High Tension soundtrack)
- 2007: Picazzo – "Hvor skal vi sove i natt" (Norway)
- 2008: Diana Sorbello – "Das ist weil ich dich liebe" (Germany)
- 2010: Tim Douwsma & Monique Smit – "Een zomeravond met jou" (Netherlands)
- 2011: Ninel Conde – "Será porque te amo" (Mexico)
- 2018: DJ Matrix & Matt Joe feat. Carolina Márquez – "Sarà perché ti amo"
- 2024: Jóhanna Guðrún & Sverrir Bergmann – "Skiptir engu máli" (Iceland)
- 2024: Beatrice Egli – "Du, Du, Du" (Switzerland)
- 2026: Carte Blanq and Maxx Power – "Kimi Antonelli"

Perikles' 1982 version does alter the lyrical content. The other Swedish/Danish/Norwegian versions effectively cover the Perikles version (or in one instance parody it), while the Carte Blanq and Maxx Power version altered the lyrics to serve as a tribute to the aforementioned Italian Formula One driver.

== Soundtracks ==
The song has been used in several movie soundtracks:

- 2003 French slasher film High Tension, starring Cécile de France and Maïwenn
- 2014 Franco-Belgian animated comedy film Asterix: The Mansions of the Gods, starring Roger Carel.
- 2020 international sports drama film Tigers, Sweden's submission to the 94th Academy Awards.
- 2026 American romantic comedy drama film Solo Mio, starring Kevin James and Nicole Grimaudo.
- 2026 American romantic comedy film You, Me & Tuscany, starring Halle Bailey and Regé-Jean Page.

== See also ==
- List of number-one hits of 1981 (Italy)
