= María Abradelo =

Spanish actress

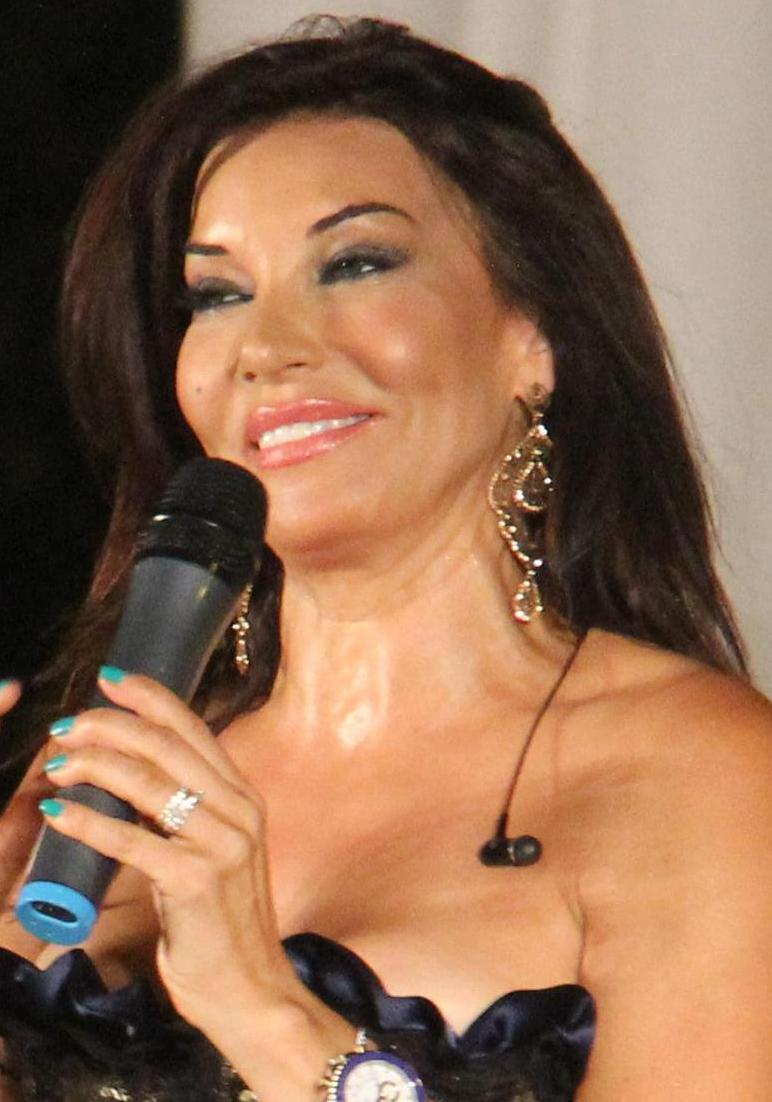
- Abradelo (2015)
- Born: María Emilia Bastante Patón; 10 October 1969 (age 56); Madrid, Spain
- Occupation: Actress
- Mother: Isabel Patton
- Website: www.mariaabradelo.com

María Patton Bastante Abradelo (born 10 October 1969) better known as María Abradelo is a Spanish actress.

== Career ==
Abradelo was born in Madrid, to singer Isabel Patton.

Her professional career began as a presenter on the Canal Sur program Para que veas, with her sister Romy Abradelo. She appeared on the Televisión Española (TVE) series Tango, and was hired in 1991 as secretary on the game show Un, dos, tres... responda otra vez.

In the summer of 1993, she was hired by Tele 5 to present the program Ven a cantar (Come and sing) and then she joined the network as a regular presenter in spaces such as La batalla de las estrellas and Campeones de la playa (1994). On TVE she presented the comedy programme A toda risa (1999).

As an actress, Abradelo has participated in TV series such as: Hermanos de leche (1994–1995) on Antena 3 TV, Carmen y familia on TVE or La revista de José Luis Moreno on TVE. She has also taken part in shows such as Cinco minutos no menos, with Loreto Valverde and Jesús Cisneros, El águila de fuego, with María José Cantudo and Alberto Closas Jr. or Cómo están las mujeres, with Loreto Valverde and Carlos Lozano.

In film, she was involved in a Mexican co-production entitled La nena quiere irse a Londres (The Girl Wants to Go to London) and has participated in Xoel Pamos' film Freedomless; in theatre she has starred in Yola with her sister Romy Abradelo and Pantaleón and the visitors with Fernando Guillén and Carmen Grey. Later she was signed up by Channel 9 where she presented the program Canta Canta and the children's program Babalá for several consecutive seasons. After that, in the summers she presents karaoke programs both in CMT and Canal Sur.

In 2005, María Abradelo also participated in La isla de los famosos.

In 2007, she collaborated in the presentation of the Eurovision Song Contest and she also presented the program Sensational Night together with Andoni Ferreño and Mar Saura. That same year, José Luis Moreno hired her to present the New Year's Eve programme on some regional channels such as Canal9 and CMT, together with Mabel Lozano and Rubén Sanz.

In 2008, she premiered the contest El picú on Channel 9, a program with a musical character that was broadcast in the afternoon.

In 2013, he participates as a contestant in the reality show of Cuatro Expedición impossible with his sister Romy

In 2014, Canta con Abradelo music contest had been on Canal7 TeleValencia.

== Discography ==
=== Alone ===
2001: Mamma Maria

=== As Abradelo ===
2013: Superstar 2013: Mi Cenicienta
