= I miei americani... 2 =

Studio album by Adriano Celentano
- Released: late 1986
- Label: Clan

Adriano Celentano chronology
Joan Lui (1985)	I miei americani... 2 (1986)	La pubblica ottusità (1987)

Professional ratings
Review scores
Source	Rating
Epoca	no rating
AllMusic	3/5 stars

I miei americani... 2 (also catalogued as I miei americani (tre puntini) 2) is a studio album by Italian singer Adriano Celentano, released in late 1986 on his label Clan.

The Epoca magazine reviewed the album, writing the following: "Pop-rock melodies rewritten, sometimes massacred, re-arranged and with lyrics in Italian. A half disaster."

== Track listing ==
Side 1
No.	Title	Length
1.	"Veronica verrai" ("Veronica You'll Come")	4:35
2.	"Gelosia" ("Jalousie")	4:20
3.	"Ma come fa la gente sola" ("Eleonor Rigby")	3:18
4.	"Mi scade" ("She's Got It")	3:03
5.	"Vivrò per lei" ("My Prayer")	2:42

Side 2
No.	Title	Length
1.	"Seguirò chi mi ama" ("Is It Love")	3:38
2.	"L'ascensore" ("Sixteen Tons")	2:43
3.	"È finita" ("Cry")	3:58
4.	"Un'altra ragazza" ("Love Me Do")	4:04
5.	"Crederò" ("Crazy Love")	3:35

== Charts ==
Chart (1986)	Peak position
Italy (Musica e dischi)	4
