= Pinuccio Pirazzoli =

Italian composer, arranger, conductor and record producer

- Born: Giuseppe Pirazzoli; 9 June 1949 (age 77); Milan, Italy
- Occupation: Composer

Giuseppe "Pinuccio" Pirazzoli (born 9 June 1949) is an Italian composer, arranger, conductor, musician and record producer.

== Life and career ==
Born in Milan, Pirazzoli started playing piano at the age of five and guitar at the age of eight. As a child, he appeared in several Carosello sketches as a baby pianist. After being part of several local groups, he started his professional career as the guitarist of I Ragazzi della Via Gluck, the backup band of Adriano Celentano, with whom he continued to collaborate even after the group disbanded. Starting from the early 1970s Piraccioli focused his activities on composing and arranging, collaborating among others with Gino Paoli, Riccardo Cocciante, Umberto Tozzi, Amedeo Minghi, Renato Zero, Donatella Rettore, Al Bano and Romina Power, Iva Zanicchi, Luca Barbarossa, Mario Castelnuovo.

Pirazzoli is a popular figure of the Sanremo Music Festival, taking part as a conductor in numerous editions of the event since 1990. He often collaborated with RAI as a composer of TV scores and as conductor in several TV-shows.
