= Cristiano Minellono =

Italian songwriter and actor (born 1946)

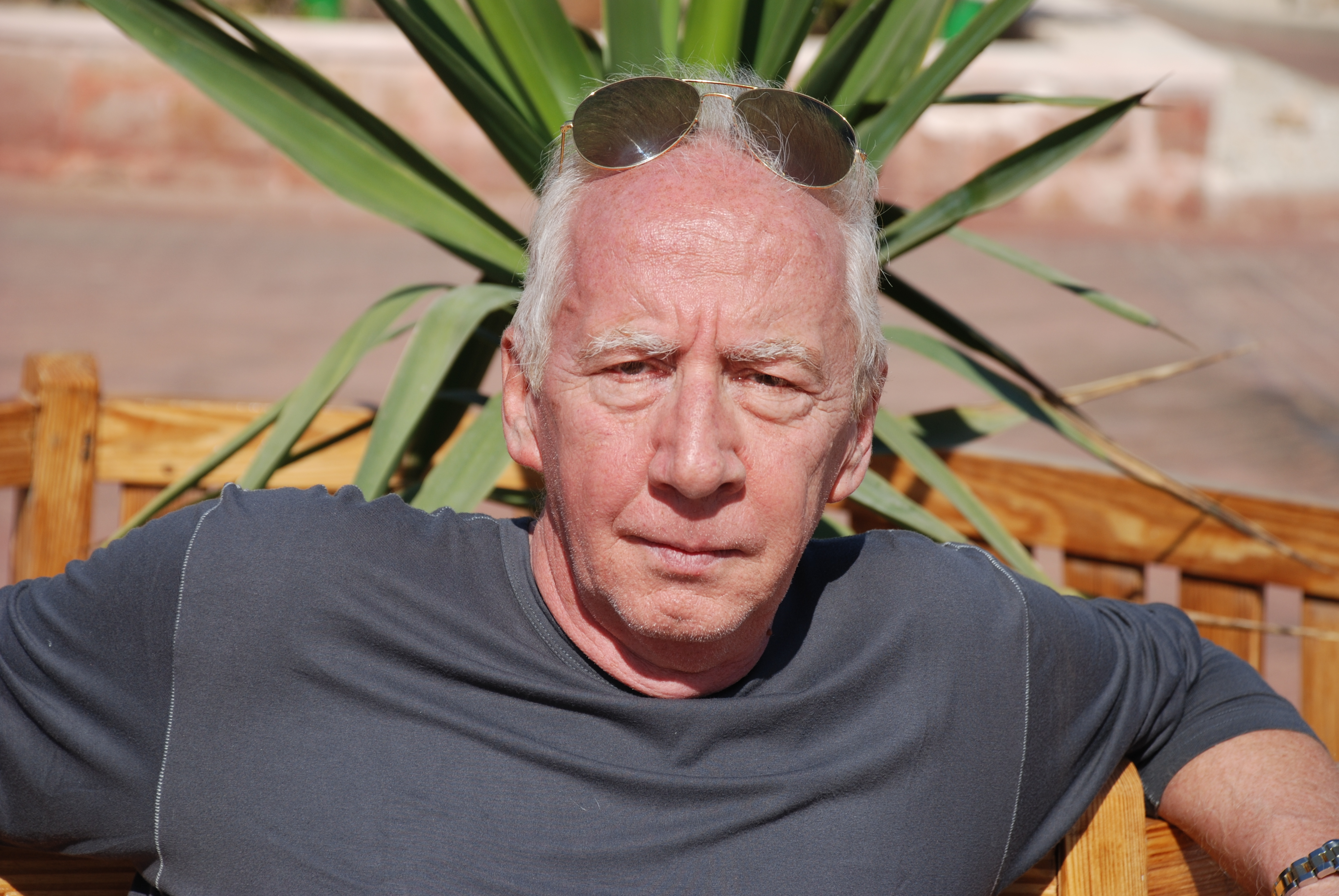
- Minellono in 2009
- Born: 27 March 1946 (age 78); Arona, Piedmont, Kingdom of Italy
- Occupations: Songwriter; actor

Cristiano Minellono (born 27 March 1946) is an Italian songwriter and actor. He is also known as Popi Minellono.

== Life and career ==
Born in Arona, Piedmont, Minellono debuted as a lyricist in 1967, with the song "È ancora giorno", performed by Shirley Bassey. In 1968 he got his first successes, Patrick Samson's "Soli si muore" and Dik Dik's "Il primo giorno di primavera". After further hits for Umberto Balsamo, Nomadi and Wess & Dori Ghezzi, in 1980 he started a fruitful collaboration as producer and lyricist with Toto Cutugno and Adriano Celentano, notably writing the lyrics for Cutugno's major hit "L'Italiano".

In the first half of the 1980s, Minellono was the usual lyricist for Al Bano and Romina Power's and Ricchi e Poveri's songs, contributing to relaunching their careers. Two of his songs won the Sanremo Music Festival, in 1984 Al Bano and Romina's "Ci sarà" and in 1985 Ricchi e Poveri's "Se m'innamoro".

Also active as a creative director, since early 1980s Minellono collaborated as a television writer to numerous Fininvest and later Mediaset television programmes.
