= Ricchi e Poveri =

Italian band (1967–present)

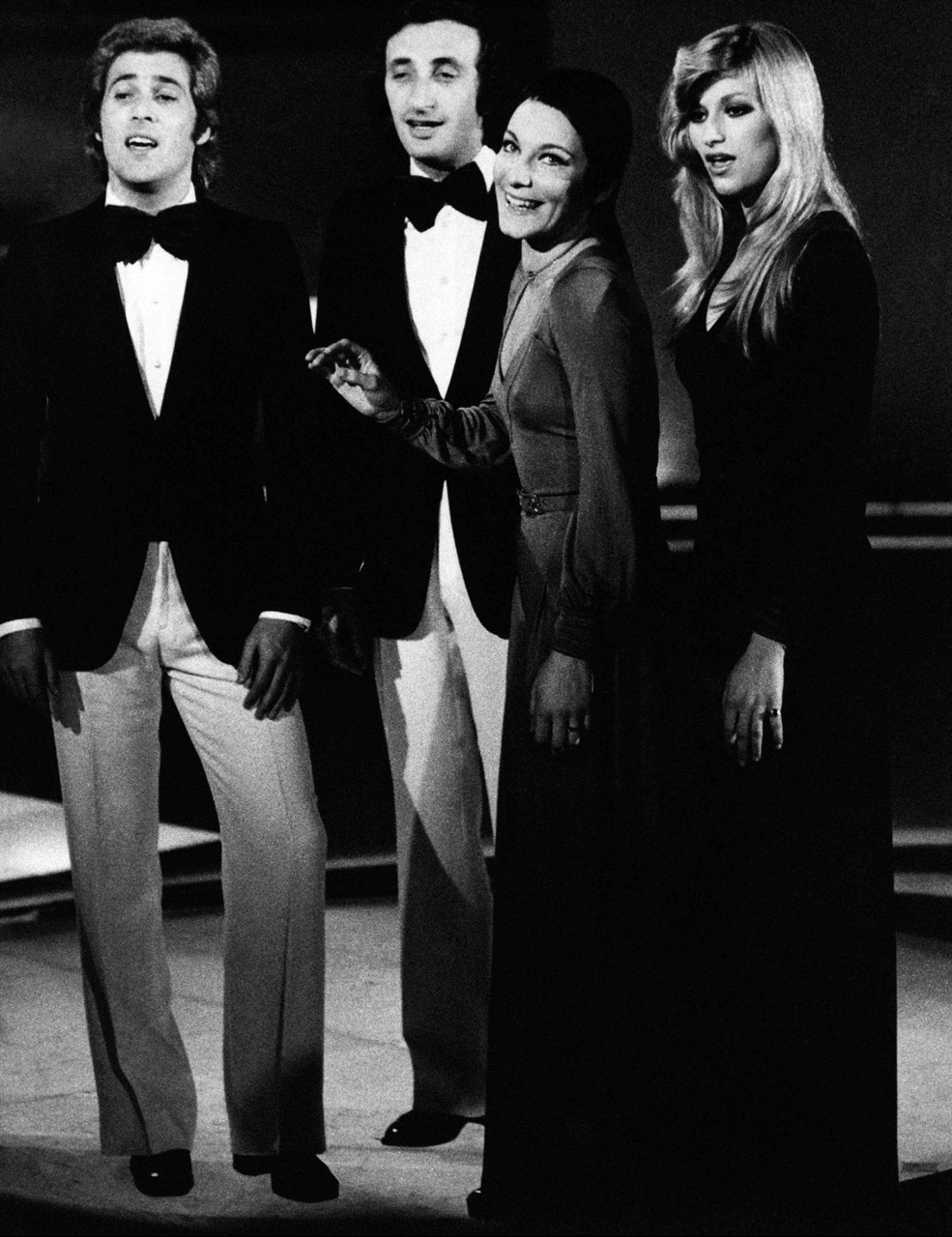
- Ricchi e Poveri performing in 1973; left to right: Angelo Sotgiu, Franco Gatti, Angela Brambati and Marina Occhiena

Background information
- Origin: Genoa, Italy
- Genres: Pop
- Years active: 1967–present
- Members: Angela Brambati; Angelo Sotgiu
- Past members: Franco Gatti †; Marina Occhiena
- Website: ricchiepoveri.com

Ricchi e Poveri (Italian pronunciation: [ˈrikki e pˈpɔːveri]; "The Rich and The Poor") is an Italian pop group formed in Genoa in 1967, originally consisting of Angela Brambati, Angelo Sotgiu, Franco Gatti and Marina Occhiena. Active since the late 1960s, they have sold over 20 million records.

== History ==
=== 1967–1980: formation and early years ===
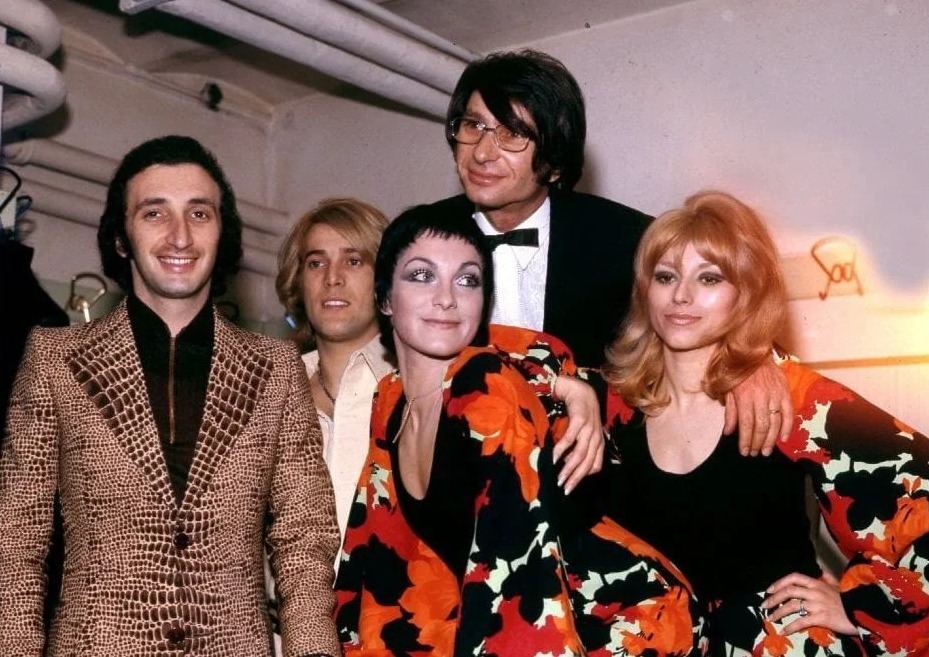
Ricchi e Poveri with Nicola di Bari at Sanremo 1970

The group was formed in 1967 in Genoa as a polyphonic quartet by singers Angela Brambati, Angelo Sotgiu, Franco Gatti and Marina Occhiena in 1967. They were all originally of the city, with Sotgiu having Sardinian roots from Trinità d'Agultu e Vignola. The band got their name from Roman songwriter Franco Califano who once joked that they were "spiritually rich but financially poor". The quartet earned its own unique vocal style, based on the intertwining of four different voices: bass (Gatti), tenor (Sotgiu), alto (Occhiena) and soprano (Brambati).

Their first public appearance was in Cantagiro 1968 with "L'ultimo amore". Ricchi e Poveri have participated in the Sanremo Music Festival several times since 1970; in 1971 they sang there "Che sarà", which was written by Jimmy Fontana and Franco Migliacci. 1971 was the last year of the festival in which each song was performed twice, each time by a different artist. Ricchi e Poveri gave the second performance of the song, following Nicola di Bari. The song was also released by José Feliciano, who had worldwide hits with Italian, Spanish and English versions of the song.

Ricchi e Poveri represented Italy at the Eurovision Song Contest 1978 with the song "Questo amore", finishing 12th in a field of 20 participants.

=== 1981–2009: new formation and subsequent projects ===
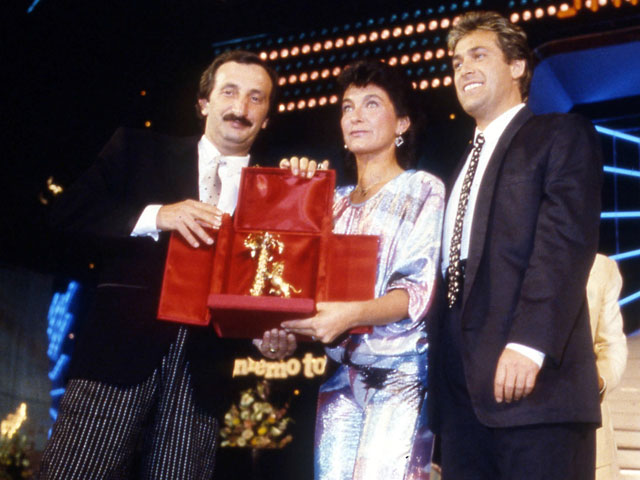
Ricchi e Poveri upon their Sanremo 1985 victory

In 1981, Marina Occhiena left the group to pursue a solo career.

Ricchi e Poveri has recorded in Italian and Spanish some of their 1980s and 1990s hits, including "Mamma Maria", "Made in Italy", "M'innamoro di te" and "Se m'innamoro", the latter of which won the Sanremo Music Festival 1985.

==== "Sarà perché ti amo" ====
In 1981, the band recorded a Spanish version of the single "Sarà perché ti amo". The song, retitled "Será porque te amo", became a hit in Mexico, the Caribbean, and Central and South America.

Several groups covered the song, adapting it to different genres, including tropical, dance, and various forms of Mexican folk music known as Grupera. The Latino boy band projects Los Chicos and Los Chamos, and the Italo-Dance band Eu4ya also covered the song, but the lyrics were heavily altered; only the chorus line was kept in one verse, and the rest was rearranged to make the song more appealing to teenagers.

The song is featured in some film soundtracks: L'Effrontée (1985), Spike of Bensonhurst (1988), High Tension (2003) and Unmade Beds (2009).

As of 2007, the song is still being covered in all genres, and it has achieved somewhat of a cult/nostalgia status in several Spanish-speaking countries, as a symbol of a generation. The song was remade in 2008 in German, by Diana Sorbello as "Das ist, weil ich dich liebe" and in 2011, in Dutch, by Monique Smit and Tim Douwsma as "Eén zomeravond met jou".

=== Recent years ===
Ricchi e Poveri held two massive concerts in the Mediterranean island of Malta on the 12 and 13 June 2009. The band's popularity in Malta resulted in another concert on 6 November 2010. Ricchi e Poveri completed a tour of Italy and Slovenia in 2012, followed at the beginning of 2013 with a three-song set in the Discoteka 80's concert in Moscow.

In 2016, the group's founder, Franco Gatti, retired from the group at the age of 74. The death of his son Alessio at the age of 23 in 2013 had changed his life to the extent that he was no longer able to make jokes about his moustache and big nose, and he felt he could no longer carry on touring the world.

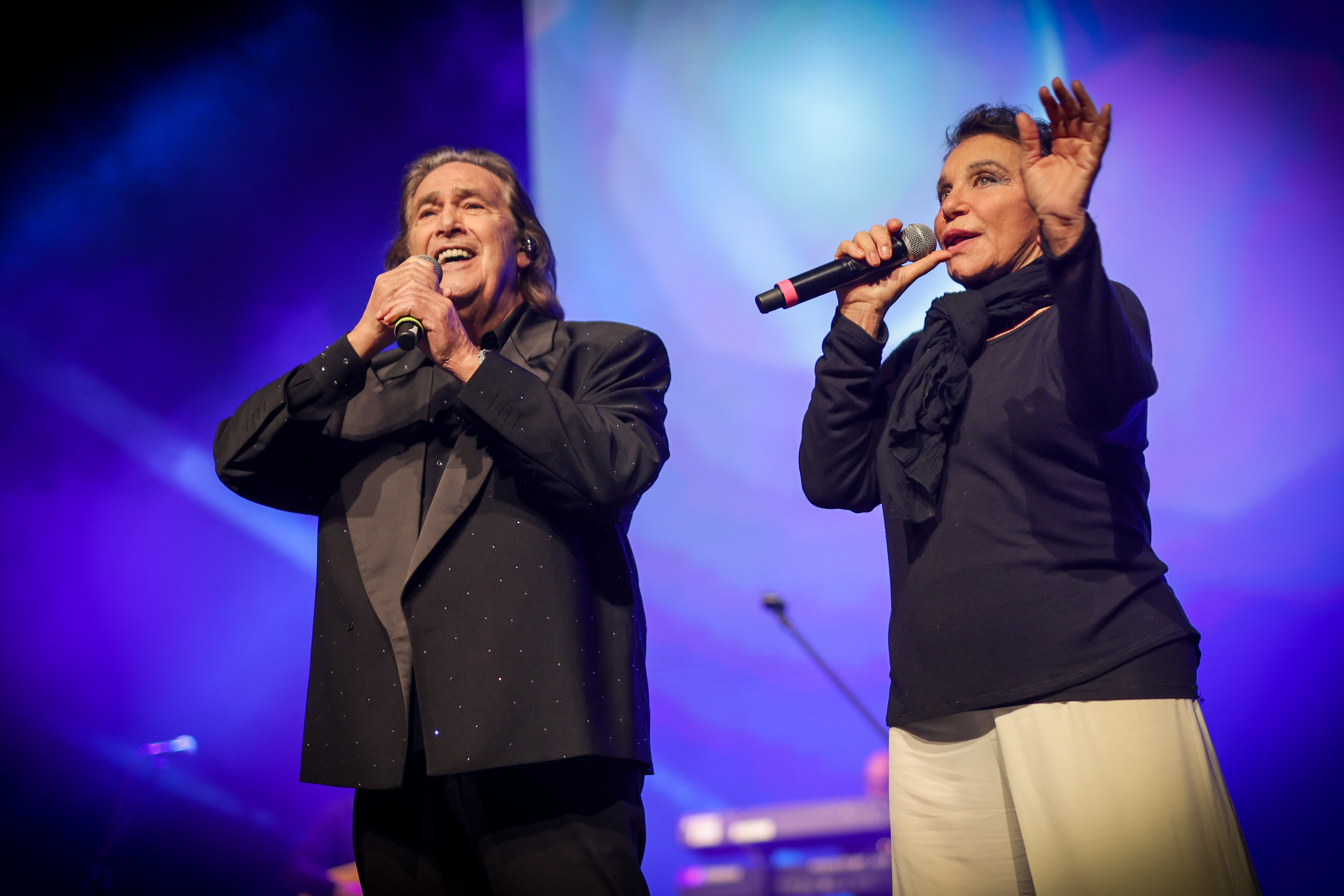
Ricchi e Poveri performing in Sofia in 2024

In 2020, the original line-up reunited at the Sanremo Music Festival to celebrate the 50th anniversary of the band's debut. Gatti died on 18 October 2022 at the age of 80.

In 2023, Ricchi e Poveri toured Australia with concerts in Sydney, Melbourne and Adelaide. They competed in the Sanremo Music Festival 2024 with the song "Ma non tutta la vita".

== Members ==
- Angela Brambati (born 20 October 1947) – vocals (1967–present)
- Angelo Sotgiu (born 22 February 1946) – vocals, guitars, saxophones (1967–present)
- Franco Gatti (4 October 1942 – 18 October 2022) – guitars, vocals, keyboards (1967–2016, 2020–2021; died 2022)
- Marina Occhiena (born 19 March 1950) – vocals (1967–1981, 2020–2021)

== Discography ==
=== Studio albums ===
- Ricchi e Poveri (1970)
- Amici miei (1971)
- Penso sorrido e canto (1974)
- RP2 (1975)
- I musicanti (1976)
- Questo amore (1978)
- La stagione dell'amore (1980)
- E penso a te (1981)
- Mamma Maria (1982)
- Voulez-vous danser (1983)
- Dimmi quando (1985)
- Pubblicità (1987)
- Nascerà Gesù - Ricchi e Poveri '88 (1988)
- Buona giornata e... (1990)
- Allegro italiano (1992)
- I più grandi successi (1994)
- Parla col cuore (1999)
- Perdutamente amore (2012)
- ReuniON (2021)

=== Compilations ===
- 1972 — Un diadema di successi
- 1976 — Ricchi & Poveri
- 1978 — Ricchi & Poveri
- 1982 — Come eravamo
- 1982 — Profili musicali
- 1983 — Made in Italy
- 1984 — Ieri e Oggi
- 1990 — Canzoni d'amore
- 1990 — Una domenica con te
- 1993 — Anche tu...
- 1997 — Piccolo Amore
- 1998 — BMG Collection
- 2000 — I grandi successi originali
- 2008 — Greatest Hits
- 2011 — Le canzoni, la nostra storia

=== Singles in English ===
- 1976 — "Wonderland"/"Love Will Come"
- 1981 — "Make It with Me"/"Sarà perché ti amo"

Awards and achievements
Preceded by Mia Martini with "Libera"	Italy in the Eurovision Song Contest; 1978	Succeeded by Matia Bazar with "Raggio di luna"
Preceded by Al Bano and Romina Power with "Ci sarà"	Sanremo Music Festival; Winner; 1985	Succeeded by Eros Ramazzotti with "Adesso tu"
